= 2017 Women's National Invitation Tournament =

Women's college basketball post-season tournament

- Season: 2016–17
- Teams: 64
- Finals site: Calihan Hall, Detroit, Michigan
- Champions: Michigan Wolverines (1st title)
- Runner-up: Georgia Tech Yellow Jackets (1st title game)
- Semifinalists: Villanova Wildcats (1st semifinal); Washington State Cougars (1st semifinal)
- Winning coach: Kim Barnes Arico (1st title)
- MVP: Katelynn Flaherty (Michigan)
- Attendance: 4,417 (championship game)

The 2017 Women's National Invitation Tournament was an annual single-elimination tournament of 64 NCAA Division I teams that were not selected to participate in the 2017 Women's NCAA tournament. The tournament committee announced the 64-team field on March 13, following the selection of the NCAA Tournament field. The tournament began on March 15 and ended on April 1, with the championship game televised on the CBS Sports Network. In the championship game, the Michigan Wolverines defeated the Georgia Tech Yellow Jackets, 89–79, in triple overtime.

== Participants ==
The 2017 Postseason WNIT field consists of 32 automatic invitations – one from each conference – and 32 (or more) at-large teams. The intention of the WNIT Selection Committee was to select the best available at-large teams in the nation. A team offered an automatic berth by the WNIT will be the team that is the highest-finishing team in its conference's regular-season standings, and not selected for the NCAA Tournament. A team that fulfills these qualities, and accepts, earned the WNIT automatic berth for its conference, regardless of overall record. The remaining berths in the WNIT were filled by the best teams available. Any team considered for an at-large berth has an overall record of .500 or better.

=== Automatic qualifiers ===
Conference	School
America East	New Hampshire
American	UCF
Atlantic 10	George Washington
Atlantic Sun	Stetson
ACC	Virginia
Big 12	Oklahoma State
Big East	Villanova
Big Sky	North Dakota
Big South	Radford
Big Ten	Michigan
Big West	UC Davis
Colonial	James Madison
C-USA	Middle Tennessee
Horizon League	Wright State
Ivy League	Princeton
MAAC	Rider
MAC	Central Michigan
MEAC	Bethune-Cookman
Missouri Valley	Missouri State
Mountain West	Colorado State
Northeast	Sacred Heart
Ohio Valley	Morehead State
Pac-12	Washington State
Patriot	Navy
Southern	Mercer
Southland	Abilene Christian
SWAC	Grambling State
Summit League	IUPUI
Sun Belt	Little Rock
WCC	BYU
WAC	Seattle

=== At-large bids ===
Conference	School
SEC	Alabama
MAC	Ball State
Pac-12	Colorado
Colonial	Drexel
Atlantic 10	Duquesne
Atlantic 10	Fordham
Big East	Georgetown
ACC	Georgia Tech
Ivy	Harvard
Big Ten	Indiana
Big Ten	Iowa
Atlantic Sun	Jacksonville
MAC	Kent State
C-USA	Louisiana Tech
MAC	Northern Illinois
MAC	Ohio
SEC	Ole Miss
Big Ten	Penn State
Big East	St. John's
Atlantic 10	Saint Joseph's
Atlantic 10	Saint Louis
WCC	Saint Mary's
Summit League	South Dakota
Summit League	South Dakota State
American	SMU
C-USA	Southern Miss
Sunbelt	Texas–Arlington
American	Tulane
Mountain West	UNLV
Pac-12	Utah
ACC	Virginia Tech
ACC	Wake Forest
Mountain West	Wyoming

== Bracket ==
All times are listed as Eastern Daylight Time (UTC−4)
* – Denotes overtime period

Round 1 March 16–17
Colorado State	80*
Saint Mary's	68
Utah	62
UC Davis	72
BYU	64
Washington State	72
Wyoming	68
Seattle	52
South Dakota	78
North Dakota	55
Iowa	95
Missouri State	74
South Dakota State	94
Northern Illinois	84
Colorado	66
UNLV	52

Round 2 March 18–19
Colorado State	57
UC Davis	58
Washington State	68*
Wyoming	67
South Dakota	73
Iowa	78
South Dakota State	75
Colorado	81*

Round 3 March 23
UC Davis	62
Washington State	71
Iowa	80
Colorado	62

Quarterfinals; March 26
Washington State	74
Iowa	66

Round 1 March 15–16
Tulane	62
Texas-Arlington	57
Ole Miss	75
Grambling State	78
Alabama	81
Mercer	57
Southern Miss	62
Little Rock	72
Middle Tennessee	67
Morehead State	58
Wake Forest	71
Bethune-Cookman	42
Georgia Tech	71
Jacksonville	55
UCF	73
Stetson	53

Round 2 March 19
Tulane	66
Grambling State	49
Alabama	55
Little Rock	53
Middle Tennessee	73
Wake Forest	66
Georgia Tech	63
UCF	51

Round 3 March 23
Tulane	64
Alabama	72
Middle Tennessee	57
Georgia Tech	70

Quarterfinals; March 26
Alabama	66
Georgia Tech	76

Round 1 March 16–17
Michigan	67
Kent State	60
Wright State	66
Central Michigan	64
New Hampshire	56
Harvard	69
St. John's	72
Sacred Heart	43
Penn State	74
Ohio	65
Georgetown	49
Fordham	60
George Washington	51
Navy	61*
Virginia Tech	76
Rider	62

Round 2 March 18–19
Michigan	71
Wright State	66
Harvard	57
St. John's	62
Penn State	70
Fordham	51
Navy	64
Virginia Tech	75

Round 3 March 23
Michigan	60
St. John's	40
Penn State	55
Virginia Tech	64

Quarterfinals; March 25
Michigan	80
Virginia Tech	62

Round 1 March 16–17
Princeton	53
Villanova	59
Drexel	70
Duquesne	47
James Madison	80
Radford	59
Saint Joseph's	56
Virginia	62
Indiana	71
Ball State	58
Saint Louis	62
IUPUI	57
Oklahoma State	56
Abilene Christian	66
SMU	75*
Louisiana Tech	70

Round 2 March 19–20
Villanova	56
Drexel	51
James Madison	61
Virginia	55
Indiana	71
Saint Louis	53
Abilene Christian	52
SMU	59

Round 3 March 23
Villanova	69*
James Madison	67
Indiana	64
SMU	44

Quarterfinals; March 26
Villanova	69
Indiana	57

=== Semifinals and Championship Game ===
Semifinals; March 29
Washington State	61
Georgia Tech	69
Michigan	65
Villanova	61

Championship Game; April 1
Georgia Tech	79
Michigan	89***

== All-tournament team ==
- Katelynn Flaherty, Michigan (MVP)
- Alex Louin, Villanova
- Zaire O'Neil, Georgia Tech
- Francesca Pan, Georgia Tech
- Alexys Swedlund, Washington State
- Hallie Thome, Michigan

== See also ==
- 2017 National Invitation Tournament
