= 2016–17 NCAA Division I women's basketball season =

American college basketball season

- Preseason AP No. 1: Notre Dame
- Regular season: November 11, 2016 – March 3, 2017
- NCAA Tournament: 2017
- Tournament dates: March 16, 2017 – April 2, 2017
- National Championship: American Airlines Center; Dallas, Texas
- NCAA Champions: South Carolina
- Other champions: Michigan (WNIT); Rice (WBI)
- Player of the Year (Naismith, Wooden): Kelsey Plum, Washington

The 2016–17 NCAA Division I women's basketball season began on November 11, 2016 and ended with the Final Four title game in Dallas on April 2, 2017, won by South Carolina. Practices officially began on September 30, 2016.

== Season headlines ==
- April 20 – The NCAA announced its Academic Progress Rate (APR) sanctions for the 2016–17 school year. A total of 23 Division I programs in 13 sports were declared ineligible for postseason play due to failure to meet the required APR benchmark, with Southern being the only women's basketball team so penalized.
- April 28 – The Atlantic Sun Conference announced that effective with the 2016–17 school year, it would rebrand itself as the ASUN Conference.
- November 2 – The Associated Press preseason All-American team was released. South Carolina forward A'ja Wilson was the leading vote-getter (32 votes). Joining her on the team were Ohio State guard Kelsey Mitchell (31 votes), Notre Dame forward Brianna Turner (29), Baylor forward Nina Davis and Washington guard Kelsey Plum.
- November 23 – In what ESPN called "one of the most bizarre scenarios imaginable at a major sporting event", top-ranked Notre Dame and Louisiana–Lafayette used two different venues during Notre Dame's 91–51 win. The game began at Campbell Center, a high school venue in Houston, but a power outage during the second quarter prompted the teams to complete the game at another venue. Rice, whose women's team had just completed a home game, offered its Tudor Fieldhouse, and the two teams bused to that venue and finished the game there.
- December 5 – The ASUN Conference announced that North Alabama would move from the Division II Gulf South Conference and join the ASUN in 2018.
- January 7 – A bench-clearing brawl broke out during the third quarter of the UNLV–Utah State game after a UNLV player was fouled. Four players from each team were ejected. Three days later, the Mountain West Conference, home to both schools, issued one-game suspensions to three participants in the brawl (two from UNLV and one from Utah State) and reprimanded six other participants.
- January 13 – The Western Athletic Conference announced that California Baptist would move from the Division II Pacific West Conference and join the WAC in 2018.
- January 26 – The Summit League announced that North Dakota, then a member of the Big Sky Conference, would join the league in 2018.
- February 2 – The Colonial Athletic Association announced that two conference wins by Charleston would be treated as Charleston losses for purposes of seeding in the conference tournament, though it did not (and could not) reverse the results. The conference confirmed that the Cougars had provided "improperly sized" basketballs in the two games, though it would not confirm that men's basketballs were used instead of women's balls.

=== Milestones and records ===
- December 8 – In Ohio State's 108–73 win over Southern, the Buckeyes' Kelsey Mitchell became the fastest Division I women's player to reach 2,000 career points, reaching the mark in her 79th game. The previous record of 82 was held by Missouri State's Jackie Stiles.
- December 11 – Kelsey Plum became the all-time leading scorer in Pac-12 Conference history (for either women or men), passing the former record of Stanford's Chiney Ogwumike during Washington's 92–66 win over Boise State. (Note: Although Cheryl Miller, who starred at USC during the 1980s, then had more career points than either Plum or Ogwumike, she never played in the Pac-12 (or, as it was known during her career, the Pac-10). The conference did not sponsor women's sports until the 1986–87 season, the season after Miller's graduation.)
- December 16 – Baylor defeated Winthrop 140–32, setting a new Division I women's basketball record for victory margin.
- January 10 – UConn crushed South Florida 102–37 to give the Huskies their 90th straight win, equaling the program's own record for the longest winning streak by a Division I team of either sex.
- January 13 – Plum became the 12th player in Division I women's history with 3,000 career points during Washington's 90–73 win over Arizona.
- January 14 – UConn defeated SMU 88–48 for its 91st straight win, establishing a new Division I record streak.
- February 3 – Stanford defeated USC 58–42, giving Cardinal head coach Tara VanDerveer her 1,000th career win. She joined late Tennessee head coach Pat Summitt and current Duke men's head coach Mike Krzyzewski as the only Division I coaches at that time to reach the milestone.
- February 13 – UConn extended its record winning streak to 100 games with a 66–55 win over South Carolina.
- February 25 – Plum scored 57 points, a school record for either sex, in Washington's 84–77 win over Utah, surpassing Stiles for the top spot on the all-time NCAA Division I women's career scoring list. (Note: Lynette Woodard finished her career at Kansas in 1981 with 3,649 points, more than Plum's final career total of 3,527. However, Woodard's entire career was in the era when women's college sports were governed by the AIAW; the NCAA did not organize women's sports until the 1981–82 season.)
- March 6 – In the American Athletic Conference tournament final, UConn's Katie Lou Samuelson made all 10 of her three-point attempts, setting a new women's Division I record for most consecutive three-pointers in a game. The Huskies blasted South Florida 100–44 to enter the NCAA Tournament unbeaten.
- March 18 – In the first round of the NCAA tournament, Texas A&M came back from a 21-point deficit early in the fourth quarter, ending on a 25–1 run to defeat Penn 63–61. This set a new record for largest comeback in the Division I women's tournament, surpassing the previous record of 16 points by Notre Dame in 2001 and Michigan State in 2005.
- March 19 – In the same round, Baylor set two all-time tournament records in its 119–30 pasting of Texas Southern:
  - The 89-point margin was the largest ever, surpassing the previous record of 74 set by Tennessee against North Carolina A&T in 1994.
  - Baylor's 119 points were the most ever scored in regulation, surpassing the previous record of 116 set by Ohio State in 1998 and equaled twice by UConn, including earlier that same day.
- March 21 – In the second round of the NCAA tournament, Plum surpassed Stiles' D-I record for points in a season, scoring 38 in the Huskies' 108–82 win over Oklahoma and finishing the game with 1,080 points on the season. Plum eventually finished with 1,109 points on the season and 3,527 for her career.
- March 31 – UConn's record winning streak ended at 111 games with a 66–64 overtime loss to Mississippi State on a buzzer-beater by the Bulldogs' Morgan William.

=== Coaching wins milestones ===
- 1000 victories - Tara VanDerveer, Stanford, February 3 versus USC.
- 600 victories - Gordy Presnell, Boise State, December 18 versus Portland.
- 500 victories - Jeff Mittie, Kansas State, December 4 versus Omaha.
- 500 victories - Sandra Rushing, Central Arkansas, February 11 versus Nicholls.
- 500 victories - Kim Mulkey, Baylor, February 25 versus Texas Tech.

== Conference membership changes ==
Only one school joined a new conference for 2016–17:

School	Former conference	New conference
Coastal Carolina	Big South Conference	Sun Belt Conference

== Pre-season polls ==
The top 25 from the AP and USA Today Coaches Polls.

Associated Press
Ranking	Team
1	Notre Dame (14)
2	Baylor (12)
3	Connecticut (6)
4	South Carolina (1)
5	Louisville
6	Maryland
7	Ohio State
8	Texas
9	UCLA
10	Mississippi State
11	Stanford
12	Florida State
13	Tennessee
14	Miami (FL)
15	Syracuse
16	Oklahoma
17	Washington
18	Arizona State
19	Kentucky
20	Florida
21	DePaul
22	West Virginia
23	Indiana
24	Missouri
25	Oregon State

USA Today Coaches
Ranking	Team
1	Connecticut (18)
2	Notre Dame (8)
3	South Carolina (3)
4	Baylor (2)
5	Maryland
6	Ohio State
7	Texas (1)
8	Louisville
9	UCLA
10	Stanford
11	Mississippi State
12	Florida State
13	Syracuse
14	Tennessee
15	Washington
16	Arizona State
17	Oregon State
18	Oklahoma
19	Kentucky
20	Miami (FL)
21	DePaul
22	Michigan State
23	Texas A&M
24	Florida
25	West Virginia

== New arenas ==
- South Dakota opened the new Sanford Coyote Sports Center. The completion of the 6,000-seat venue saw the South Dakota men's basketball, women's basketball, and women's volleyball teams move out of the considerably larger DakotaDome, which remains home to football, track & field, and swimming & diving. The first women's basketball game in the new arena was the opening leg of a November 13 doubleheader with the men's team, with the Coyotes defeating Stephen F. Austin 80–74.
- North Dakota State opened the renovated Scheels Center. This completion brought the previously outdated Bison Sports Arena up to full Division 1 standards. The arena resumed competition of their men's basketball, women's basketball, and wrestling teams inside the Scheels Center. The renovated arena seats 5,700 people on the North side of NDSU's campus in Fargo, North Dakota. The first women's game played in the renovated arena was an exhibition on November 3, 2016 against NCAA Division II Bemidji State, the Bison winning that game 79-59. The first official women's game was on November 12, 2016; the Bison beat Dickinson State University 70-63.

In addition, Alabama returned women's home games to Coleman Coliseum, home to Alabama men's basketball since the venue's opening in 1968. The Crimson Tide women began play in 1974 at Foster Auditorium, and split home games between the two facilities until moving full-time into the Coliseum in 1981. The women would move back to Foster near the end of the 2010–11 season, and used that as their main venue until returning to the Coliseum.

This proved to be the final season for four Division I teams in their then-current venues.

- DePaul left its current on-campus home of McGrath–Phillips Arena for the new off-campus Wintrust Arena, a 10,000-seat venue that opened in October 2017 at the McCormick Place convention center on Chicago's Near South Side. The new arena also houses the DePaul men's team.
- NJIT left one on-campus venue for another. The aging Fleisher Center (capacity 1,600) was replaced by the Wellness and Events Center (capacity 3,500) for the 2017–18 season.
- Robert Morris closed the Charles L. Sewall Center, home to the Colonials since 1985, in June 2017. The UPMC Events Center is currently being built at the Sewall Center site and is scheduled to open in the middle of the 2018–19 basketball season. Until that time, the Colonials are playing at the Student Recreation and Fitness Center, which was built at the school's North Athletic Complex as part of the UPMC Events Center project and opened in September 2017.
- Wofford also moved within its campus, going from Benjamin Johnson Arena (capacity 3,500) to the slightly smaller Jerry Richardson Indoor Stadium (capacity 3,400).

== Regular season ==
=== Early preseason tournament ===
==== Tournament upsets ====
For this list, an "upset" is defined as a win by a team seeded 7 or more spots below its defeated opponent.

Date	Winner	Score	Loser	Region	Round
March 18	Oregon (10)	71–70	Temple (7)	Bridgeport	Round of 64
March 18	Quinnipiac (12)	68–65	Marquette (5)	Lexington	Round of 64
March 20	Oregon (10)	74–65	Duke (2)	Bridgeport	Round of 32
March 20	Quinnipiac (12)	85–78	Miami (FL) (4)	Bridgeport	Round of 32
March 25	Oregon (10)	77–63	Maryland (2)	Bridgeport	Sweet Sixteen

=== Conference winners and tournaments ===
Each of the 32 Division I athletic conferences ends its regular season with a single-elimination tournament. The team with the best regular-season record in each conference is given the number one seed in each tournament, with tiebreakers used as needed in the case of ties for the top seeding. The winners of these tournaments receive automatic invitations to the 2017 NCAA Division I women's basketball tournament. This will be the first season in which the Ivy League holds a conference tournament.

Conference	Regular season winner	Conference player of the year	Conference Coach of the Year	Conference tournament	Tournament venue (city)	Tournament winner
America East Conference	New Hampshire	Carlie Pogue, New Hampshire	Maureen Magarity, New Hampshire	2017 America East women's basketball tournament	Campus sites	Albany
American Athletic Conference	UConn	Napheesa Collier & Katie Lou Samuelson, UConn	Geno Auriemma, UConn & Tonya Cardoza, Temple	2017 American Athletic Conference women's basketball tournament	Mohegan Sun Arena (Uncasville, CT)	UConn
ASUN Conference	Stetson	Brianti Saunders, Stetson	Lynn Bria, Stetson	2017 ASUN women's basketball tournament	Campus sites	Florida Gulf Coast
Atlantic 10 Conference	Dayton (Note: Top seed in conference tournament.); George Washington	Jackie Kemph, Saint Louis	Jeff Williams, La Salle	2017 Atlantic 10 women's basketball tournament	First round at campus sites Remainder at Richmond Coliseum (Richmond, VA)	Dayton
Atlantic Coast Conference	Notre Dame	Alexis Peterson, Syracuse	Wes Moore, NC State	2017 ACC women's basketball tournament	HTC Center (Conway, SC)	Notre Dame
Big 12 Conference	Baylor	Brooke McCarty, Texas	Karen Aston, Texas	2017 Big 12 Conference women's basketball tournament	Chesapeake Energy Arena (Oklahoma City, OK)	West Virginia
Big East Conference	Creighton; DePaul	Brooke Schulte, DePaul	Doug Bruno, DePaul	2017 Big East women's basketball tournament	Al McGuire Center (Milwaukee, WI)	Marquette
Big Sky Conference	Montana State; North Dakota	Peyton Ferris, Montana State	Travis Brewster, North Dakota	2017 Big Sky Conference women's basketball tournament	Reno Events Center (Reno, NV)	Montana State
Big South Conference	Radford	Emma Bockrath, High Point	Ronny Fisher, Campbell	2017 Big South Conference women's basketball tournament	Vines Center (Lynchburg, VA)	UNC Asheville
Big Ten Conference	Maryland; Ohio State	Kelsey Mitchell, Ohio State	Kim Barnes Arico, Michigan	2017 Big Ten Conference women's basketball tournament	Bankers Life Fieldhouse (Indianapolis, IN)	Maryland
Big West Conference	UC Davis	Channon Fluker, Cal State Northridge	Jennifer Gross, UC Davis	2017 Big West Conference women's basketball tournament	First round/Quarterfinals at Walter Pyramid (Long Beach, CA); Remainder at Honda Center (Anaheim, CA)	Long Beach State
Colonial Athletic Association	Elon	Precious Hall, James Madison	Charlotte Smith, Elon	2017 CAA women's basketball tournament	JMU Convocation Center (Harrisonburg, VA)	Elon
Conference USA	WKU	Jennie Simms, Old Dominion	Joye Lee-McNelis, Southern Miss	2017 Conference USA women's basketball tournament	First round/Quarterfinals at Bartow Arena (Birmingham, AL); Remainder at Legacy Arena (Birmingham, AL)	WKU
Horizon League	Green Bay	Mehryn Kraker, Green Bay	Katrina Merriweather, Wright State	2017 Horizon League women's basketball tournament	Joe Louis Arena (Detroit, MI)	Green Bay
Ivy League	Penn	Michelle Nwokedi, Penn	Mike McLaughlin, Penn	2017 Ivy League women's basketball tournament	Palestra (Philadelphia, PA)	Penn
Metro Atlantic Athletic Conference	Quinnipiac	Robin Perkins, Rider	Lynn Milligan, Rider	2017 MAAC women's basketball tournament	Times Union Center (Albany, NY)	Quinnipiac
Mid-American Conference	Kent State (East); Central Michigan (West)	Larissa Lurken, Kent State	Todd Starkey, Kent State	2017 Mid-American Conference women's basketball tournament	First round at campus sites Remainder at Quicken Loans Arena (Cleveland, OH)	Toledo
Mid-Eastern Athletic Conference	Bethune–Cookman	Te’Shya Heslip, Howard	Vanessa Blair-Lewis, Bethune–Cookman	2017 MEAC women's basketball tournament	Norfolk Scope (Norfolk, VA)	Hampton
Missouri Valley Conference	Drake	Lizzy Wendell, Drake	Jennie Baranczyk, Drake	2017 Missouri Valley Conference women's basketball tournament	iWireless Center (Moline, IL)	Drake
Mountain West Conference	Colorado State	Ellen Nystrom, Colorado State	Joe Legerski, Wyoming	2017 Mountain West Conference women's basketball tournament	Thomas & Mack Center (Paradise, NV)	Boise State
Northeast Conference	Robert Morris	Anna Niki Stamolamprou, Robert Morris	Charlie Buscaglia, Robert Morris	2017 Northeast Conference women's basketball tournament	Campus sites	Robert Morris
Ohio Valley Conference	Belmont	Tearra Banks, Austin Peay	Cameron Newbauer, Belmont	2017 Ohio Valley Conference women's basketball tournament	Nashville Municipal Auditorium (Nashville, TN)	Belmont
Pac-12 Conference	Oregon State	Kelsey Plum, Washington	Scott Rueck, Oregon State	2017 Pac-12 Conference women's basketball tournament	KeyArena (Seattle, WA)	Stanford
Patriot League	Bucknell	Claire DeBoer, Bucknell	Aaron Roussell, Bucknell	2017 Patriot League women's basketball tournament	Campus sites	Bucknell
Southeastern Conference	South Carolina	A'ja Wilson, South Carolina	Robin Pingeton, Missouri	2017 SEC women's basketball tournament	Bon Secours Wellness Arena (Greenville, SC)	South Carolina
Southern Conference	Chattanooga; Mercer	Kahlia Lawrence, Mercer	Trina Patterson, UNC Greensboro	2017 Southern Conference women's basketball tournament	U.S. Cellular Center (Asheville, NC)	Chattanooga
Southland Conference	Central Arkansas	Taylor Ross, Stephen F. Austin	Sandra Rushing, Central Arkansas	2017 Southland Conference women's basketball tournament	Leonard E. Merrell Center (Katy, TX)	Central Arkansas
Southwestern Athletic Conference	Grambling State; Texas Southern	Britney Wright, Alabama State	Freddie Murray, Grambling State	2017 SWAC women's basketball tournament	Toyota Center (Houston, TX)	Texas Southern
The Summit League	Western Illinois	Emily Clemens, Western Illinois	JD Gravina, Western Illinois	2017 Summit League women's basketball tournament	Denny Sanford PREMIER Center (Sioux Falls, SD)	Western Illinois
Sun Belt Conference	Little Rock	Sharde' Collins, Little Rock	Joe Foley, Little Rock	2017 Sun Belt Conference women's basketball tournament	Lakefront Arena (New Orleans, LA)	Troy
West Coast Conference	Gonzaga	Cassie Broadhead, BYU	Lisa Fortier, Gonzaga	2017 West Coast Conference women's basketball tournament	Orleans Arena (Las Vegas, NV)	Gonzaga
Western Athletic Conference	New Mexico State	Moriah Mack, New Mexico State	Mark Trakh, New Mexico State	2017 WAC women's basketball tournament	Orleans Arena (Las Vegas, NV)	New Mexico State

== Award winners ==
=== All-America teams ===
The NCAA has never recognized a consensus All-America team in women's basketball. This differs from the practice in men's basketball, in which the NCAA uses a combination of selections by the Associated Press (AP), the National Association of Basketball Coaches (NABC), the Sporting News, and the United States Basketball Writers Association (USBWA) to determine a consensus All-America team. The selection of a consensus team is possible because all four organizations select at least a first and second team, with only the USBWA not selecting a third team.

However, of the major selectors in women's basketball, only the AP divides its selections into separate teams. The women's counterpart to the NABC, the Women's Basketball Coaches Association (WBCA), selects a single 10-member (plus ties) team, as does the USBWA. The NCAA does not recognize Sporting News as an All-America selector in women's basketball.

=== Major player of the year awards ===
- Wooden Award: Kelsey Plum, Washington
- Naismith Award: Kelsey Plum, Washington
- Associated Press Player of the Year: Kelsey Plum, Washington
- Wade Trophy: Kelsey Plum, Washington
- Ann Meyers Drysdale Women's Player of the Year (USBWA): Kelsey Plum, Washington
- espnW National Player of the Year: Kelsey Plum, Washington

=== Major freshman of the year awards ===
- USBWA National Freshman of the Year: Sabrina Ionescu, Oregon
- WBCA Freshman of the Year (inaugural award): Destiny Slocum, Maryland
- espnW Freshman of the Year: Sabrina Ionescu, Oregon

=== Major coach of the year awards ===
- Associated Press Coach of the Year: Geno Auriemma, Connecticut
- Naismith College Coach of the Year: Geno Auriemma, Connecticut
- WBCA National Coach of the Year: Geno Auriemma, Connecticut

=== Other major awards ===
- Nancy Lieberman Award: Kelsey Plum, Washington
- WBCA Defensive Player of the Year: Gabby Williams, Connecticut
- Senior CLASS Award: Sydney Wiese, Oregon State
- Maggie Dixon Award (top rookie head coach): Shauna Green, Dayton
- Academic All-American of the Year (top scholar-athlete): Ally Disterhoft, Iowa
- Elite 90 Award (top GPA among upperclass players at Final Four): Brittany McPhee, Stanford
- Pat Summitt Most Courageous Award: Angel Elderkin, head coach, Appalachian State & Holly Rowe, broadcaster, ESPN

== Conference standings ==
2016–17 American Athletic Conference women's basketball standings
	Conf.				Overall
Team	W		L	PCT	W		L	PCT
No. 1 UConn †	16	–	0	1.000	36	–	1	.973
Temple	13	–	3	.813	24	–	8	.750
South Florida	11	–	5	.688	24	–	9	.727
UCF	9	–	7	.563	21	–	12	.636
SMU	7	–	9	.438	19	–	15	.559
Tulane	7	–	9	.438	18	–	15	.545
Cincinnati	7	–	9	.438	16	–	14	.533
Memphis	7	–	9	.438	14	–	16	.467
Tulsa	5	–	11	.313	10	–	21	.323
Houston	4	–	12	.250	12	–	19	.387
East Carolina	2	–	14	.125	11	–	19	.367
† 2017 The American Tournament winner As of March 31, 2017; Rankings from AP poll

2016–17 America East Conference women's basketball standings
	Conf.				Overall
Team	W		L	PCT	W		L	PCT
New Hampshire	15	–	1	.938	26	–	6	.813
Albany †	12	–	4	.750	21	–	12	.636
UMBC	10	–	6	.625	15	–	16	.484
Maine	9	–	7	.563	18	–	16	.529
Binghamton	8	–	8	.500	13	–	17	.433
Hartford	7	–	9	.438	17	–	14	.548
Vermont	6	–	10	.375	9	–	20	.310
Stony Brook	5	–	11	.313	12	–	18	.400
UMass Lowell*	0	–	16	.000	3	–	26	.103
† 2017 America East tournament winner As of March 18, 2017 *ineligible for postseason play due to Div. I transitions Rankings from AP poll

2016–17 Atlantic 10 women's basketball standings
	Conf.				Overall
Team	W		L	PCT	W		L	PCT
Dayton †	13	–	3	.813	22	–	10	.688
George Washington	13	–	3	.813	20	–	10	.667
Saint Louis	12	–	4	.750	25	–	9	.735
Saint Joseph's	12	–	4	.750	17	–	15	.531
Fordham	11	–	5	.688	22	–	12	.647
La Salle	9	–	7	.563	17	–	13	.567
Duquesne	8	–	8	.500	18	–	16	.529
VCU	8	–	8	.500	16	–	15	.516
Richmond	7	–	9	.438	13	–	17	.433
George Mason	6	–	10	.375	13	–	17	.433
St. Bonaventure	4	–	12	.250	9	–	20	.310
Davidson	4	–	12	.250	6	–	23	.207
UMass	3	–	13	.188	9	–	21	.300
Rhode Island	2	–	14	.125	6	–	23	.207
† 2017 A10 Tournament winner As of March 20, 2017; Rankings from AP poll

2016–17 ASUN women's basketball standings
	Conf.				Overall
Team	W		L	PCT	W		L	PCT
Stetson	13	–	1	.929	26	–	7	.788
Florida Gulf Coast †	12	–	2	.857	26	–	9	.743
Jacksonville	11	–	3	.786	23	–	9	.719
Kennesaw State	8	–	6	.571	10	–	20	.333
NJIT	4	–	10	.286	11	–	19	.367
North Florida	3	–	11	.214	10	–	20	.333
Lipscomb	3	–	11	.214	6	–	24	.200
USC Upstate	2	–	12	.143	9	–	21	.300
† 2017 ASUN Tournament winner As of March 18, 2017; Rankings from AP poll

2016–17 ACC women's basketball standings
	Conf.				Overall
Team	W		L	PCT	W		L	PCT
No. 2 Notre Dame^{†}	15	–	1	.938	33	–	4	.892
No. 9 Duke	13	–	3	.813	28	–	6	.824
No. 10 Florida State	13	–	3	.813	28	–	7	.800
No. 13 Louisville	12	–	4	.750	29	–	8	.784
No. 17 NC State	12	–	4	.750	23	–	9	.719
No. 21 Syracuse	11	–	5	.688	22	–	11	.667
No. 16 Miami (FL)	10	–	6	.625	24	–	9	.727
Virginia	7	–	9	.438	20	–	13	.606
Wake Forest	6	–	10	.375	16	–	16	.500
Georgia Tech	5	–	11	.313	22	–	14	.611
Virginia Tech	4	–	12	.250	20	–	14	.588
Pittsburgh	4	–	12	.250	13	–	17	.433
Clemson	3	–	13	.188	15	–	16	.484
North Carolina	3	–	13	.188	15	–	16	.484
Boston College	2	–	14	.125	9	–	21	.300
† 2017 ACC tournament winner As of March 29, 2017; Rankings from AP poll

2016–17 Big East Conference women's basketball standings
	Conf.				Overall
Team	W		L	PCT	W		L	PCT
No. 19 DePaul*	16	–	2	.889	27	–	8	.771
Creighton	16	–	2	.889	24	–	8	.750
Marquette†	13	–	5	.722	25	–	8	.758
St. John's	11	–	7	.611	22	–	12	.647
Villanova	11	–	7	.611	20	–	14	.588
Georgetown	9	–	9	.500	17	–	13	.567
Providence	4	–	14	.222	12	–	18	.400
Xavier	4	–	14	.222	12	–	18	.400
Seton Hall	4	–	14	.222	12	–	19	.387
Butler	2	–	16	.111	6	–	25	.194
† 2017 Big East tournament winner * Tournament #1 seed As of March 29, 2017; Rankings from AP poll

2016–17 Big Sky women's basketball standings
	Conf.				Overall
Team	W		L	PCT	W		L	PCT
Montana State †	15	–	3	.833	25	–	7	.781
North Dakota	15	–	3	.833	20	–	11	.645
Northern Colorado	14	–	4	.778	22	–	8	.733
Eastern Washington	12	–	6	.667	19	–	14	.576
Idaho	11	–	7	.611	19	–	15	.559
Idaho State	10	–	8	.556	19	–	14	.576
Portland State	8	–	10	.444	16	–	17	.485
Weber State	6	–	12	.333	13	–	18	.419
Sacramento State	6	–	12	.333	10	–	20	.333
Northern Arizona	5	–	13	.278	9	–	21	.300
Montana	4	–	14	.222	7	–	23	.233
Southern Utah	2	–	16	.111	7	–	23	.233
† 2017 Big Sky tournament winner As of March 23, 2017; Rankings from AP poll

2016–17 Big South women's basketball standings
	Conf.				Overall
Team	W		L	PCT	W		L	PCT
Radford	14	–	4	.778	24	–	9	.727
Campbell	13	–	5	.722	21	–	8	.724
High Point	13	–	5	.722	15	–	14	.517
Liberty	12	–	6	.667	11	–	16	.407
Charleston Southern	11	–	7	.611	16	–	12	.571
Presbyterian	10	–	8	.556	12	–	17	.414
UNC Asheville†	9	–	9	.500	18	–	15	.545
Gardner-Webb	6	–	12	.333	11	–	17	.393
Winthrop	1	–	17	.056	2	–	28	.067
Longwood	1	–	17	.056	4	–	25	.138
† 2017 Big South tournament winner As of March 17, 2017; Rankings from AP poll

2016–17 Big Ten women's basketball standings
	Conf.				Overall
Team	W		L	PCT	W		L	PCT
No. 4 Maryland^{†}	15	–	1	.938	32	–	3	.914
No. 11 Ohio State*	15	–	1	.938	28	–	7	.800
Michigan	11	–	5	.688	28	–	9	.757
Indiana	10	–	6	.625	23	–	11	.676
Purdue	10	–	6	.625	23	–	13	.639
Michigan State	9	–	7	.563	21	–	12	.636
Penn State	9	–	7	.563	21	–	11	.656
Northwestern	8	–	8	.500	20	–	11	.645
Iowa	8	–	8	.500	20	–	14	.588
Minnesota	5	–	11	.313	15	–	16	.484
Illinois	3	–	13	.188	9	–	22	.290
Wisconsin	3	–	13	.188	9	–	22	.290
Nebraska	3	–	13	.188	7	–	22	.241
Rutgers	3	–	13	.188	6	–	24	.200
† 2017 Big Ten tournament winner * Tournament #1 seed Rankings from AP poll

2016–17 Big West women's basketball standings
	Conf.				Overall
Team	W		L	PCT	W		L	PCT
UC Davis	14	–	2	.875	25	–	8	.758
Long Beach State †	12	–	4	.750	23	–	12	.657
Cal State Northridge	10	–	6	.625	18	–	14	.563
UC Riverside	9	–	7	.563	16	–	15	.516
UC Santa Barbara	9	–	7	.563	16	–	16	.500
Hawaii	7	–	9	.438	12	–	18	.400
Cal Poly	7	–	9	.438	11	–	18	.379
UC Irvine	3	–	13	.188	5	–	26	.161
Cal State Fullerton	1	–	15	.063	4	–	25	.138
† 2017 Big West tournament winner As of March 23, 2017; Rankings from AP poll

2016–17 Big 12 Conference women's basketball standings
	Conf.				Overall
Team	W		L	PCT	W		L	PCT
No. 5 Baylor	17	–	1	.944	33	–	4	.892
No. 14 Texas	15	–	3	.833	25	–	9	.735
No. 23 Oklahoma	13	–	5	.722	23	–	10	.697
No. 24 Kansas State	11	–	7	.611	23	–	11	.676
Iowa State	9	–	9	.500	18	–	13	.581
No. 22 West Virginia †	8	–	10	.444	24	–	11	.686
Oklahoma State	6	–	12	.333	17	–	15	.531
Texas Tech	5	–	13	.278	14	–	17	.452
TCU	4	–	14	.222	12	–	18	.400
Kansas	2	–	16	.111	8	–	22	.267
† 2017 Big 12 tournament winner Rankings from AP poll

2016–17 CAA women's basketball standings
	Conf.				Overall
Team	W		L	PCT	W		L	PCT
Elon †	16	–	2	.889	27	–	7	.794
James Madison	15	–	3	.833	26	–	9	.743
Drexel	11	–	7	.611	22	–	11	.667
Delaware	10	–	8	.556	16	–	14	.533
William & Mary	9	–	9	.500	20	–	11	.645
Northeastern	8	–	10	.444	12	–	19	.387
College of Charleston	6	–	12	.333	9	–	21	.300
Hofstra	5	–	13	.278	13	–	18	.419
Towson	5	–	13	.278	12	–	18	.400
UNC Wilmington	5	–	13	.278	11	–	20	.355
† 2017 CAA tournament winner As of March 23, 2017; Rankings from AP poll

2016–17 Conference USA women's basketball standings
	Conf.				Overall
Team	W		L	PCT	W		L	PCT
WKU †	16	–	2	.889	27	–	8	.771
Middle Tennessee	15	–	3	.833	23	–	11	.676
Southern Miss	13	–	5	.722	23	–	11	.676
Charlotte	12	–	6	.667	21	–	10	.677
Louisiana Tech	12	–	6	.667	18	–	14	.563
Old Dominion	11	–	7	.611	17	–	14	.548
UTSA	10	–	8	.556	14	–	17	.452
Rice	8	–	10	.444	22	–	13	.629
UAB	8	–	10	.444	15	–	15	.500
North Texas	8	–	10	.444	12	–	19	.387
Marshall	5	–	13	.278	13	–	17	.433
UTEP	5	–	13	.278	8	–	23	.258
FIU	3	–	15	.167	5	–	24	.172
Florida Atlantic	0	–	18	.000	4	–	25	.138
† 2017 C-USA Tournament winner As of March 26, 2017; Rankings from AP poll

2016–17 Horizon League women's basketball standings
	Conf.				Overall
Team	W		L	PCT	W		L	PCT
Green Bay*^{†}	15	–	3	.833	27	–	5	.844
Wright State	15	–	3	.833	24	–	8	.750
Oakland	12	–	6	.667	18	–	12	.600
Detroit	12	–	6	.667	18	–	14	.563
Milwaukee	11	–	7	.611	20	–	11	.645
Cleveland State	9	–	9	.500	14	–	16	.467
Youngstown State	5	–	13	.278	9	–	21	.300
Northern Kentucky	5	–	13	.278	9	–	22	.290
Valparaiso	4	–	14	.222	10	–	20	.333
UIC	2	–	16	.111	6	–	24	.200
† 2017 Horizon League Tournament winner * Tournament #1 seed As of March 7, 2017; Rankings from AP poll

2016–17 Ivy League women's basketball standings
	Conf.				Overall
Team	W		L	PCT	W		L	PCT
Penn†	13	–	1	.929	22	–	7	.759
Princeton	9	–	5	.643	16	–	13	.552
Harvard	8	–	6	.571	21	–	9	.700
Cornell	7	–	7	.500	16	–	11	.593
Brown	7	–	7	.500	16	–	12	.571
Yale	6	–	8	.429	15	–	12	.556
Columbia	3	–	11	.214	13	–	14	.481
Dartmouth	3	–	11	.214	8	–	19	.296
† 2017 Ivy League Tournament winner Rankings from AP Poll

2016–17 Mid-American Conference women's basketball standings
	Conf.				Overall
Team	W		L	PCT	W		L	PCT
East
Kent State	13	–	5	.722	19	–	13	.594
Ohio	12	–	6	.667	22	–	10	.688
Buffalo	10	–	8	.556	22	–	10	.688
Miami (OH)	5	–	13	.278	11	–	21	.344
Bowling Green	4	–	14	.222	8	–	23	.258
Akron	2	–	16	.111	9	–	21	.300
West
Central Michigan	15	–	3	.833	23	–	9	.719
Ball State	14	–	4	.778	21	–	11	.656
Toledo †	12	–	6	.667	25	–	9	.735
Northern Illinois	12	–	6	.667	21	–	12	.636
Western Michigan	8	–	10	.444	19	–	13	.594
Eastern Michigan	1	–	17	.056	6	–	25	.194
† 2017 MAC tournament winner As of March 17, 2017

2016–17 MAAC women's basketball standings
	Conf.				Overall
Team	W		L	PCT	W		L	PCT
Quinnipiac †	17	–	3	.850	29	–	7	.806
Rider	16	–	4	.800	24	–	9	.727
Fairfield	13	–	7	.650	17	–	14	.548
Siena	13	–	7	.650	14	–	16	.467
Iona	12	–	8	.600	18	–	13	.581
Marist	11	–	9	.550	15	–	17	.469
Monmouth	9	–	11	.450	15	–	16	.484
Canisius	8	–	12	.400	10	–	21	.323
Niagara	5	–	15	.250	8	–	22	.267
Manhattan	4	–	16	.200	8	–	22	.267
Saint Peter's	2	–	18	.100	3	–	27	.100
† 2017 MAAC tournament winner As of March 25, 2017; Rankings from AP poll

2016–17 MEAC women's basketball standings
	Conf.				Overall
Team	W		L	PCT	W		L	PCT
Bethune-Cookman	15	–	1	.938	19	–	9	.679
Howard	12	–	4	.750	16	–	12	.571
Hampton	11	–	5	.688	17	–	12	.586
Norfolk State	9	–	7	.563	14	–	14	.500
Florida A&M	9	–	7	.563	11	–	18	.379
North Carolina A&T	8	–	8	.500	12	–	17	.414
Savannah State	8	–	8	.500	11	–	18	.379
Coppin State	8	–	8	.500	8	–	20	.286
Morgan State	7	–	9	.438	9	–	20	.310
North Carolina Central	7	–	9	.438	8	–	20	.286
Maryland-Eastern Shore	6	–	10	.375	12	–	15	.444
South Carolina State	2	–	14	.125	5	–	22	.185
Delaware State	2	–	14	.125	3	–	26	.103
† 2017 MEAC tournament winner As of March 6, 2017; Rankings from AP poll

2016–17 Missouri Valley Conference women's basketball standings
	Conf.				Overall
Team	W		L	PCT	W		L	PCT
No. 20 Drake †	18	–	0	1.000	28	–	4	.875
Northern Iowa	15	–	3	.833	24	–	8	.750
Missouri State	12	–	6	.667	16	–	14	.533
Southern Illinois	10	–	8	.556	16	–	15	.516
Wichita State	9	–	9	.500	15	–	16	.484
Evansville	8	–	10	.444	14	–	17	.452
Bradley	7	–	11	.389	12	–	19	.387
Indiana State	6	–	12	.333	12	–	18	.400
Illinois State	4	–	14	.222	8	–	23	.258
Loyola–Chicago	1	–	17	.056	2	–	28	.067
† 2017 MVC tournament winner As of March 15, 2017; Rankings from AP poll

2016–17 Mountain West Conference women's basketball standings
	Conf.				Overall
Team	W		L	PCT	W		L	PCT
Colorado State	15	–	3	.833	25	–	9	.735
Wyoming	13	–	5	.722	22	–	10	.688
Boise State†	12	–	6	.667	25	–	8	.758
UNLV	12	–	6	.667	22	–	11	.667
New Mexico	10	–	8	.556	15	–	15	.500
Utah State	9	–	9	.500	17	–	14	.548
Fresno State	8	–	10	.444	18	–	15	.545
San Jose State	7	–	11	.389	11	–	21	.344
San Diego State	6	–	12	.333	11	–	19	.367
Nevada	5	–	13	.278	11	–	19	.367
Air Force	2	–	16	.111	4	–	25	.138
† 2017 MW Tournament winner Rankings from AP poll

2016–17 Northeast Conference women's basketball standings
	Conf.				Overall
Team	W		L	PCT	W		L	PCT
Robert Morris	14	–	4	.778	22	–	11	.667
Sacred Heart	13	–	5	.722	17	–	15	.531
Saint Francis (PA)	13	–	5	.722	17	–	15	.531
Bryant	11	–	7	.611	18	–	14	.563
Mount St. Mary's	10	–	8	.556	12	–	18	.400
Central Connecticut	9	–	9	.500	11	–	20	.355
Fairleigh Dickinson	6	–	12	.333	8	–	22	.267
St. Francis Brooklyn	6	–	12	.333	8	–	22	.267
LIU Brooklyn	5	–	13	.278	6	–	23	.207
Wagner	3	–	15	.167	4	–	25	.138
† 2017 NEC tournament winner As of March 12, 2017; Rankings from AP poll

2016–17 Ohio Valley Conference women's basketball standings
	Conf.				Overall
Team	W		L	PCT	W		L	PCT
Belmont	16	–	0	1.000	27	–	5	.844
Morehead State	11	–	5	.688	21	–	9	.700
SIU Edwardsville	9	–	7	.563	14	–	18	.438
Austin Peay	8	–	8	.500	14	–	16	.467
UT Martin	8	–	8	.500	12	–	20	.375
Murray State	7	–	9	.438	15	–	14	.517
Southeast Missouri State	7	–	9	.438	13	–	17	.433
Eastern Kentucky	7	–	9	.438	13	–	19	.406
Tennessee Tech	7	–	9	.438	10	–	20	.333
Jacksonville State	6	–	10	.375	13	–	15	.464
Tennessee State	5	–	11	.313	10	–	16	.385
Eastern Illinois	5	–	11	.313	9	–	19	.321
† 2017 OVC tournament winner As of March 4, 2017; Rankings from AP poll

2016–17 Pac-12 Conference women's basketball standings
	Conf.				Overall
Team	W		L	PCT	W		L	PCT
No. 8 Oregon State	16	–	2	.889	31	–	5	.861
No. 6 Stanford †	15	–	3	.833	32	–	6	.842
No. 12 Washington	15	–	3	.833	29	–	6	.829
No. 15 UCLA	13	–	5	.722	25	–	9	.735
Arizona State	9	–	9	.500	20	–	13	.606
Oregon	8	–	10	.444	23	–	14	.622
California	6	–	12	.333	20	–	14	.588
Washington State	6	–	12	.333	16	–	20	.444
Colorado	5	–	13	.278	17	–	16	.515
Utah	5	–	13	.278	16	–	15	.516
USC	5	–	13	.278	14	–	16	.467
Arizona	5	–	13	.278	14	–	16	.467
† 2017 Pac-12 tournament winner As of March 31, 2017; Rankings from AP poll

2016–17 Patriot League women's basketball standings
	Conf.				Overall
Team	W		L	PCT	W		L	PCT
Bucknell †	16	–	2	.889	27	–	6	.818
Navy	14	–	4	.778	24	–	10	.706
Army	12	–	6	.667	22	–	9	.710
American	11	–	7	.611	15	–	16	.484
Boston University	11	–	7	.611	13	–	17	.433
Colgate	7	–	11	.389	10	–	20	.333
Loyola (MD)	6	–	12	.333	11	–	20	.355
Holy Cross	6	–	12	.333	8	–	21	.276
Lehigh	5	–	13	.278	10	–	20	.333
Lafayette	2	–	16	.111	4	–	28	.125
† 2017 Patriot League tournament winner As of March 4, 2017; Rankings from AP poll

2016–17 Southern Conference women's basketball standings
	Conf.				Overall
Team	W		L	PCT	W		L	PCT
Mercer	12	–	2	.857	25	–	6	.806
Chattanooga*^{†}	12	–	2	.857	21	–	10	.677
East Tennessee State	8	–	6	.571	16	–	14	.533
UNC Greensboro	7	–	7	.500	17	–	14	.548
Furman	7	–	7	.500	14	–	17	.452
Samford	4	–	10	.286	12	–	19	.387
Wofford	3	–	11	.214	13	–	17	.433
Western Carolina	3	–	11	.214	8	–	22	.267
† 2017 SoCon Tournament winner * Tournament #1 seed

2016–17 Southland Conference women's basketball standings
	Conf.				Overall
Team	W		L	PCT	W		L	PCT
Central Arkansas†	16	–	2	.889	26	–	5	.839
Abilene Christian*	16	–	2	.889	23	–	9	.719
Lamar	15	–	3	.833	22	–	8	.733
Stephen F. Austin	14	–	4	.778	25	–	8	.758
New Orleans	9	–	9	.500	14	–	15	.483
McNeese State	8	–	10	.444	14	–	17	.452
Texas A&M-CC	8	–	10	.444	14	–	18	.438
Northwestern State	7	–	11	.389	13	–	17	.433
Nicholls State	7	–	11	.389	10	–	20	.333
Incarnate Word*	7	–	11	.389	9	–	20	.310
Houston Baptist	4	–	14	.222	6	–	22	.214
SE Louisiana	3	–	15	.167	5	–	24	.172
Sam Houston State	3	–	15	.167	3	–	25	.107
† 2017 Southland tournament winner As of March 20, 2017 *ineligible for conference and NCAA tournament postseason play due to Div. I transition Rankings from AP poll

2016–17 SEC women's basketball standings
	Conf.				Overall
Team	W		L	PCT	W		L	PCT
No. 3 South Carolina†	14	–	2	.875	33	–	4	.892
No. 7 Mississippi State	13	–	3	.813	34	–	5	.872
No. 18 Kentucky	11	–	5	.688	22	–	11	.667
No. 25 Missouri	11	–	5	.688	21	–	11	.656
Tennessee	10	–	6	.625	20	–	12	.625
Texas A&M	9	–	7	.563	22	–	12	.647
LSU	8	–	8	.500	20	–	12	.625
Auburn	7	–	9	.438	17	–	15	.531
Georgia	7	–	9	.438	16	–	15	.516
Ole Miss	6	–	10	.375	17	–	14	.548
Alabama	5	–	11	.313	22	–	14	.611
Florida	5	–	11	.313	15	–	16	.484
Vanderbilt	4	–	12	.250	14	–	16	.467
Arkansas	2	–	14	.125	13	–	17	.433
† 2017 SEC tournament winner Rankings from AP poll

2016–17 SWAC women's basketball standings
	Conf.				Overall
Team	W		L	PCT	W		L	PCT
Grambling State	14	–	4	.778	16	–	13	.552
Texas Southern†	14	–	4	.778	20	–	9	.690
Alabama State	12	–	5	.706	13	–	14	.481
Southern	11	–	7	.611	13	–	13	.500
Arkansas-Pine Bluff	9	–	9	.500	12	–	17	.414
Alcorn State	9	–	9	.500	9	–	20	.310
Prairie View A&M	8	–	10	.444	13	–	17	.433
Mississippi Valley State	7	–	11	.389	10	–	19	.345
Jackson State	5	–	12	.294	11	–	16	.407
Alabama A&M	0	–	18	.000	2	–	25	.074
† 2017 SWAC tournament winner As of March 4, 2017; Rankings from AP poll

2016–17 Sun Belt Conference women's basketball standings
	Conf.				Overall
Team	W		L	PCT	W		L	PCT
Little Rock	17	–	1	.944	25	–	8	.758
UT Arlington	14	–	4	.778	22	–	8	.733
Troy †	12	–	6	.667	22	–	10	.688
Louisiana–Lafayette	11	–	7	.611	20	–	11	.645
Texas State	11	–	7	.611	16	–	14	.533
Georgia Southern	9	–	9	.500	13	–	17	.433
Coastal Carolina	8	–	10	.444	13	–	16	.448
Georgia State	8	–	10	.444	12	–	18	.400
Appalachian State	6	–	12	.333	12	–	19	.387
South Alabama	5	–	13	.278	11	–	20	.355
Arkansas State	4	–	14	.222	7	–	25	.219
Louisiana–Monroe	3	–	15	.167	6	–	24	.200
† 2017 Sun Belt tournament winner

2016–17 Summit League women's basketball standings
	Conf.				Overall
Team	W		L	PCT	W		L	PCT
Western Illinois †	13	–	3	.813	26	–	7	.788
IUPUI	12	–	4	.750	24	–	9	.727
South Dakota State	12	–	4	.750	23	–	9	.719
South Dakota	11	–	5	.688	23	–	9	.719
Omaha	8	–	8	.500	16	–	15	.516
Oral Roberts	7	–	9	.438	15	–	15	.500
North Dakota State	4	–	12	.250	6	–	24	.200
Denver	3	–	13	.188	6	–	24	.200
Fort Wayne	2	–	14	.125	5	–	24	.172
† 2017 Summit League Tournament winner As of March 19, 2017; Rankings from AP Poll

2016–17 West Coast Conference women's basketball standings
	Conf.				Overall
Team	W		L	PCT	W		L	PCT
Gonzaga†	14	–	4	.778	26	–	7	.788
BYU	13	–	5	.722	20	–	12	.625
Saint Mary's	13	–	5	.722	20	–	13	.606
San Francisco	11	–	7	.611	18	–	13	.581
Loyola Marymount	9	–	9	.500	14	–	16	.467
Santa Clara	9	–	9	.500	14	–	16	.467
San Diego	7	–	11	.389	14	–	16	.467
Pacific	5	–	13	.278	10	–	21	.323
Pepperdine	5	–	13	.278	7	–	23	.233
Portland	4	–	14	.222	6	–	24	.200
† 2017 WCC tournament winner As of March 18, 2017; Rankings from AP poll

2016–17 WAC women's basketball standings
	Conf.				Overall
Team	W		L	PCT	W		L	PCT
New Mexico State †	14	–	0	1.000	24	–	7	.774
Cal State Bakersfield	10	–	4	.714	15	–	14	.517
Seattle	10	–	4	.714	15	–	18	.455
UTRGV	8	–	6	.571	19	–	14	.576
Grand Canyon*	7	–	7	.500	15	–	12	.556
UMKC	4	–	10	.286	10	–	19	.345
Utah Valley	3	–	11	.214	9	–	22	.290
Chicago State	0	–	14	.000	0	–	29	.000
† 2017 WAC tournament winner As of March 19, 2017; Rankings from AP poll * Ineligible for WAC Basketball Tournament as part of reclassification from Division II

== Coaching changes ==
Several teams changed coaches during and after the season.

Team	Former coach	Interim coach	New coach	Reason
Arkansas	Jimmy Dykes		Mike Neighbors	Dykes resigned at the end of his third season, finishing with a 43–49 overall record and 16–36 in the SEC, capped off with an 11-game losing streak to end this season. Washington's Neighbors was hired as his replacement.
Belmont	Cameron Newbauer		Bart Brooks	Newbauer left to fill the Florida vacancy. DePaul assistant Brooks was hired as his replacement.
Cal State Fullerton	Daron Park		Jeff Harada	Park was fired after 4 seasons in the wake of numerous allegations of misconduct with his players. The school went to Division II for their next hire, tabbing Central Washington's Jeff Harada as the next head coach.
Davidson	Michele Savage		Gayle Coats Fulks	Savage was fired on March 8 after seven seasons. The school hired Wake Forest asst. Fulks as her replacement.
Delaware	Tina Martin	Jeanine Radice	Natasha Adair	Martin announced her Retirement on April 28. Asst. Radice was named interim coach during the school coaching search. The school would then hire Georgetown's Adair as the next head coach.
Denver	Kerry Cremeans		Jim Turgeon	Cremeans resigns on March 17. Turgeon was hired as the next coach.
Eastern Illinois	Debbie Black		Matt Bollant	Black was fired after 4 seasons, composing a 34-80 overall record with a 21-43 record in Ohio Valley Conference play. Former Illinois coach Bollant was hired as the next coach.
Florida	Amanda Butler		Cameron Newbauer	Butler was fired on March 6—her 45th birthday—after 10 seasons at her alma mater. Despite being ranked by the AP in the preseason, the Gators finished with their second losing record in three seasons, and remain the only women's team on the campus that has never won a conference championship. Florida hired Belmont head coach Newbauer.
Florida Atlantic	Kellie Lewis-Jay		Jim Jabir	Lewis-Jay was fired on March 6 after five seasons and an overall 73–103 record. Jabir was hired as the next coach.
Georgetown	Natasha Adair		James Howard	Adair left for the Delaware opening. Top assistant Howard was promoted to head coach.
Grambling State	Nadine Domond	Freddie Murray		Domond left to take an asst. coaching position at Rutgers on July 1, 2016. Asst. coach Murray was named interim coach for 2016-17. He later had the tag removed on April 6, 2017
Grand Canyon	Trent May	Milee Karre	Nicole Powell	May was fired on March 7 after 10 seasons. Top assistant Karre was named interim head coach during the search for May's successor. Oregon asst. coach and former WNBA star Powell was tabbed as the next head coach.
Illinois	Matt Bollant		Nancy Fahey	Bollant was fired on March 14 after five seasons. He went 61–94 overall and 22–62 in Big Ten play, and had been sued in 2015 by seven former players who alleged racial harassment. The Illini turned to Women's Basketball Hall of Fame coach Fahey from Division III Washington (MO), where she led the Bears to five national titles and 737 wins in 31 seasons.
Illinois State	Barb Smith		Kristen Gillespie	Smith was fired on March 13 after four seasons. She inherited a program that had put together seven straight winning seasons, but the Redbirds went 28–93 during her tenure. Illinois State hired Gillespie from Division II in-state school Lewis.
Lafayette	Theresa Grentz	C.K. Calhoun	Kia Damon	Grentz was fired on April 4 after two seasons and a 10–51 overall record and 6–30 in conference play. Top assistant Calhoun was named as interim head coach during the search for Grentz' successor. The school would then hire Cincinnati asst. Damon as their next head coach.
Long Beach State	Jody Wynn		Jeff Cammon	Wynn left for the Washington opening. The school hired Colorado asst. Cammon, who was previously an assistant under Wynn for 5 seasons.
Maine	Richard Barron	Amy Vachon		Barron was forced to take an extended medical leave on January 6 due to an as-yet-undetermined, but not life-threatening, neurological condition. Vachon took over on an interim basis at that time. Her interim term was extended after the end of the season in order to allow Barron to seek further treatment and determine if he can return to coaching.
Marshall	Matt Daniel		Tony Kemper	Daniel resigned on March 12 after five seasons, citing family reasons, specifically an opportunity to move back to his home state of Arkansas. Marshall promoted top assistant Kemper to fill the vacancy.
Mississippi Valley State	Jessica Kern		Ashley Walker	Kern left after 1 season for the Tennessee State opening. The school went to the NAIA for their next hire, tabbing Wiley College's Walker as the next coach.
Mount St. Mary's	Bryan Whitten		Maria Marchesano	Whitten was fired on March 22. IUPUI asso. head coach Marchesano was hired as his replacement.
Murray State	Rob Cross		Rechelle Turner	Cross was fired on February 27 after nine seasons. While he led the Racers to an OVC regular-season title in his first season, the Racers never finished higher than fourth in the conference during the rest of his tenure. The Racers went a mere five minutes' drive for their new coach, hiring Turner after 21 seasons as head coach at their city's high school.
Nevada	Jane Albright		Amanda Levens	Albright announced her retirement on March 1, effective at season's end, after 33 seasons as a Division I head coach and nine at Nevada. The Wolf Pack hired top Arizona State assistant Levens, who had been a Nevada assistant from 2003 to 2008.
New Mexico State	Mark Trakh		Brooke Atkinson	Trakh left for the USC vacancy. Atkinson, who served as an assistant at New Mexico State from 2003 to 2011, was hired after serving as an assistant coach at Colorado State for the last three seasons.
North Carolina Central	Vanessa Taylor	Kendra Eaton	Trisha Stafford-Odom	Taylor was fired on March 23 after an 8–21 season and a 33–113 overall record in five seasons. The Eagles, after naming assistant Eaton as interim coach during their search for a permanent replacement, hired Stafford-Odom, a former assistant at UCLA, North Carolina, and Duke, from Division II Concordia–Irvine.
Old Dominion	Karen Barefoot		Nikki McCray	Barefoot left for the UNC Wilmington opening. The school hired former WNBA All-Star McCray-Penson, who spent the last 9 seasons as an assistant under Dawn Staley at South Carolina.
Pepperdine	Ryan Weisenberg		DeLisha Milton-Jones	Weisenberg was fired on March 8 after four seasons in which the Waves went 28–94, capped off with a 7–23 record this season. The Waves hired Milton-Jones, who joined the program as an assistant at the start of the season after 17 seasons playing in the WNBA.
Southeastern Louisiana	Errol Gauff		Ayla Guzzardo	Gauff resign from Southeastern Louisiana on March 9. Guzzardo was hired as the next coach.
Tennessee State	Larry Joe Inman		Jessica Kern	Inman resigned as head coach on March 9, 2017, citing personal reasons. Mississippi Valley State coach Jessica Kern was hired as his replacement.
UNCW	Adell Harris		Karen Barefoot	Harris resigned from UNCW on April 12, 2017 to pursue other interests. The school hired Old Dominion's Barefoot as her replacement.
USC	Cynthia Cooper-Dyke		Mark Trakh	Cooper-Dyke resigned after the Trojans' season ended with a first-round loss in the Pac-12 Tournament on March 3. She had led the Trojans to an NCAA appearance in her first season in 2014, but the Trojans posted mediocre records in her other three seasons, ending with a 14–16 mark this season. The Trojans brought back Trakh, who had been their head coach from 2004 to 2009, from New Mexico State.
UTEP	Keitha Adams		Kevin Baker	Adams left for the Wichita State opening. The school hired Baker from Division II Angelo State to be their next head coach.
Washington	Mike Neighbors		Jody Wynn	Neighbors left for the Arkansas opening. The school hired Long Beach State's Wynn as his replacement.
Wichita State	Jody Adams-Birch	Linda Hargrove	Keitha Adams	The Shockers parted ways with Adams-Birch on January 22 with the team at 8–10 on the season. She had been temporarily replaced by top assistant Kirk Crawford three days earlier while AD Darron Boatright reviewed the program. Following Adams-Birch's departure, former Shockers head coach Hargrove was brought back to serve for the remainder of the season. Wichita State ultimately hired UTEP head coach Keitha Adams as the permanent replacement.
Winthrop	Kevin Cook	Lynette Woodard		The Eagles parted ways with Cook on February 24 after suspending him in January for what the school called a personnel matter. Top assistant Woodard was named interim coach during Cook's suspension, and Winthrop removed the interim tag after the season.

== See also ==
- 2016–17 NCAA Division I men's basketball season
