= 2017 NCAA Division I women's basketball tournament =

Women's basketball championship

- Season: 2016–17
- Teams: 64
- Finals site: American Airlines Center, Dallas, Texas
- Champions: South Carolina Gamecocks (1st title, 1st title game, 2nd Final Four)
- Runner-up: Mississippi State Bulldogs (1st title game, 1st Final Four)
- Semifinalists: UConn Huskies (18th Final Four); Stanford Cardinal (13th Final Four)
- Winning coach: Dawn Staley (1st title)
- MOP: A'ja Wilson (South Carolina)

The 2017 NCAA Division I women's basketball tournament was played from Friday, March 17 to Sunday, April 2, 2017, with the Final Four played at the American Airlines Center in Dallas, Texas on March 31 and April 2. This was the first time that the women's Final Four was played in Dallas and the first time since 2002 that the Final Four games were played on Friday and Sunday, rather than Sunday and Tuesday. South Carolina defeated Mississippi State to win the championship.

Tennessee continued its record streak of making every NCAA women's basketball tournament at 36 consecutive appearances. UConn also continued its record streak of 10 consecutive Final Four appearances.

== Schedule and venues ==
The first two rounds, also referred to as the subregionals, were played at the sites of the top 16 seeds, as was done in 2016. The following are the sites that hosted each round of the 2017 tournament.

First and second rounds

- March 17 and 19
  - Colonial Life Arena, Columbia, South Carolina (Host: University of South Carolina)
  - Donald L. Tucker Civic Center, Tallahassee, Florida (Host: Florida State University)
  - Edmund P. Joyce Center, Notre Dame, Indiana (Host: University of Notre Dame)
  - Frank Erwin Center, Austin, Texas (Host: University of Texas at Austin)
  - Gill Coliseum, Corvallis, Oregon (Host: Oregon State University)
  - Humphrey Coliseum, Mississippi State, Mississippi (Host: Mississippi State University)
  - Memorial Coliseum, Lexington, Kentucky (Host: University of Kentucky)
  - Xfinity Center, College Park, Maryland (Host: University of Maryland)
- March 18 and 20
  - Bramlage Coliseum, Manhattan, Kansas (Host: Kansas State University) (Note: As the #2 seed in their region, Stanford University was entitled to host the first and second rounds at Maples Pavilion but was unable to do so due to a scheduling conflict. As a result, hosting rights reverted to the next-highest seed in Stanford's pod of four teams, #7 Kansas State.)
  - Cameron Indoor Stadium, Durham, North Carolina (Host: Duke University)
  - Ferrell Center, Waco, Texas (Host: Baylor University)
  - Harry A. Gampel Pavilion, Storrs, Connecticut (Host: University of Connecticut)
  - Hec Edmundson Pavilion, Seattle, Washington (Host: University of Washington)
  - KFC Yum! Center, Louisville, Kentucky (Host: University of Louisville)
  - Pauley Pavilion, Los Angeles, California (Host: University of California, Los Angeles)
  - Watsco Center, Coral Gables, Florida (Host: University of Miami)

Regional semifinals and finals (Sweet Sixteen and Elite Eight)

2017 NCAA Regionals (blue) and Final Four (red) (Hover over city to see link to arena.)
- March 24–27
  - Bridgeport Regional, Webster Bank Arena, Bridgeport, Connecticut (Hosts: Fairfield University and University of Connecticut)
  - Oklahoma City Regional, Chesapeake Energy Arena, Oklahoma City, Oklahoma (Host: University of Oklahoma)
  - Lexington Regional, Rupp Arena, Lexington, Kentucky (Host: University of Kentucky)
  - Stockton Regional, Stockton Arena, Stockton, California (Host: University of the Pacific)

National semifinals and championship (Final Four and championship)

- March 31 and April 2
  - American Airlines Center, Dallas, Texas (Host: Big 12 Conference)

== Tournament procedure ==
Pending any changes to the format, a total of 64 teams will enter the 2017 tournament. Thirty-two automatic bids shall be awarded to each program that wins their conference's tournament. The remaining 36 bids are "at-large", with selections extended by the NCAA Selection Committee. The tournament is split into four regional tournaments, and each regional has teams seeded from 1 to 16, with the committee ostensibly making every region as comparable to the others as possible. The top-seeded team in each region plays the #16 team, the #2 team plays the #15, etc. (meaning where the two seeds add up to 17, that team will be assigned to play another).

The basis for the subregionals returned to the approach used between 1982 and 2002; the top sixteen teams, as chosen in the bracket selection process, hosted the first two rounds on campus.

The Selection Committee will also seed the entire field from 1 to 64.

Selections for the 2017 NCAA Division I women's basketball championship were announced at 7 p.m. Eastern time, Monday, March 13 via ESPN.

== Subregionals tournament and automatic qualifiers ==
=== Automatic qualifiers ===
The following teams automatically qualified for the 2017 NCAA field by virtue of winning their conference's tournament.

Conference	Team	Appearance	Last bid
ACC	Notre Dame	24th	2016
America East	Albany	6th	2016
American	UConn	29th	2016
Atlantic 10	Dayton	7th	2015
Atlantic Sun	Florida Gulf Coast	4th	2015
Big 12	West Virginia	12th	2016
Big East	Marquette	10th	2011
Big Sky	Montana State	2nd	1993
Big South	UNC Asheville	3rd	2016
Big Ten	Maryland	25th	2016
Big West	Long Beach State	12th	1992
Colonial	Elon	1st	Never
C-USA	WKU	19th	2015
Horizon	Green Bay	17th	2016
Ivy	Penn	5th	2016
MAAC	Quinnipiac	3rd	2015
MAC	Toledo	8th	2001
MEAC	Hampton	9th	2014
Missouri Valley	Drake	11th	2007
Mountain West	Boise State	4th	2015
Northeast	Robert Morris	5th	2016
Ohio Valley	Belmont	3rd	2016
Pac-12	Stanford	31st	2016
Patriot	Bucknell	3rd	2008
SEC	South Carolina	14th	2016
Southern	Chattanooga	15th	2016
Southland	Central Arkansas	2nd	2016
SWAC	Texas Southern	1st	Never
Summit	Western Illinois	2nd	1995
Sun Belt	Troy	3rd	2016
West Coast	Gonzaga	9th	2015
WAC	New Mexico State	5th	2016

=== Tournament seeds ===
Bridgeport Regional – Webster Bank Arena, Bridgeport, Connecticut
Seed	School	Conference	Record	RPI	Berth type
1	UConn	American	32–0	1	Auto
2	Duke	ACC	27–5	8	At-large
3	Maryland	Big Ten	30–2	16	Auto
4	UCLA	Pac-12	23–8	9	At-large
5	Texas A&M	SEC	21–11	22	At-large
6	West Virginia	Big 12	23–10	40	Auto
7	Temple	American	24–7	18	At-large
8	Syracuse	ACC	21–10	31	At-large
9	Iowa State	Big 12	18–12	60	At-large
10	Oregon	Pac-12	21–13	36	At-large
11	Elon	Colonial	27–6	21	Auto
12	Pennsylvania	Ivy League	22–7	50	Auto
13	Boise State	Mountain West	25–7	47	Auto
14	Bucknell	Patriot	27–5	62	Auto
15	Hampton	Mid-Eastern	20–12	151	Auto
16	Albany	America East	21–11	113	Auto

Lexington Regional – Rupp Arena, Lexington, Kentucky
Seed	School	Conference	Record	RPI	Berth type
1	Notre Dame	ACC	30–3	2	Auto
2	Stanford	Pac-12	28–5	6	Auto
3	Texas	Big 12	23–8	13	At-large
4	Kentucky	SEC	21–10	14	At-large
5	Ohio St.	Big 10	26–6	27	At-large
6	North Carolina St.	ACC	22–8	39	At-large
7	Kansas St.	Big 12	22–10	24	At-large
8	Green Bay	Horizon	27–5	28	Auto
9	Purdue	Big 10	22–12	58	At-large
10	Drake	Missouri Valley	28–4	26	Auto
11	Auburn	SEC	17–14	45	At-large
12	Western Ky.	Conference USA	27–6	35	Auto
13	Belmont	Ohio Valley	27–5	57	Auto
14	Central Ark.	Southland	26–4	82	Auto
15	New Mexico St.	WAC	24–6	137	Auto
16	Robert Morris	NEC	22–10	181	Auto

Oklahoma City Regional – Chesapeake Energy Arena, Oklahoma City, Oklahoma
Seed	School	Conference	Record	RPI	Berth type
1	Baylor	Big 12	30–3	7	At-large
2	Mississippi St.	SEC	29–4	5	At-large
3	Washington	Pac-12	27–5	10	At-large
4	Louisville	ACC	27–7	11	At-large
5	Tennessee	SEC	19–11	19	At-large
6	Oklahoma	Big 12	22–9	20	At-large
7	DePaul	Big East	26–7	17	At-large
8	LSU	SEC	20–11	37	At-large
9	California	Pac-12	19–13	56	At-large
10	UNI	Missouri Valley	24–8	52	At-large
11	Gonzaga	WCC	26–6	66	Auto
12	Dayton	A-10	22–9	33	Auto
13	Chattanooga	Southern	21–10	68	Auto
14	Montana St.	Big Sky	25–6	65	Auto
15	Troy	Sun Belt	22–10	106	Auto
16	Texas Southern	SWAC	23–9	169	Auto

Stockton Regional – Stockton Arena, Stockton, California
Seed	School	Conference	Record	RPI	Berth type
1	South Carolina	SEC	27–4	3	Auto
2	Oregon St.	Pac-12	29–4	4	At-large
3	Florida St.	ACC	25–6	12	At-large
4	Miami (FL)	ACC	23–8	15	At-large
5	Marquette	Big East	25–7	29	Auto
6	Missouri	SEC	21–10	25	At-large
7	Creighton	Big East	23–7	23	At-large
8	Arizona St.	Pac-12	19–12	34	At-large
9	Michigan St.	Big 10	21–11	42	At-large
10	Toledo	Mid-American	25–8	44	Auto
11	South Fla.	American	24–8	30	At-large
12	Quinnipiac	MAAC	27–6	32	Auto
13	Florida Gulf Coast	Atlantic Sun	26–8	80	Auto
14	Western Ill.	Summit	25–6	59	Auto
15	Long Beach St.	Big West	23–10	111	Auto
16	UNC Asheville	Big South	19–14	197	Auto

== Tournament records ==
- Kentucky's Evelyn Akhator recorded 23 rebounds in a second-round game against Ohio State, tied for second most ever in an NCAA tournament game.
- Duke held Hampton to 2 points in the second period of a first-round game, the fewest points scored in a period in an NCAA tournament game.
- Baylor beat Texas Southern by 89 points in a first-round game, the largest margin of victory in an NCAA tournament game.
- Texas A&M was behind by 21 points to Penn (58–37) in the fourth period of a first-round game, but came back to win 63–61.
- Washington made 18 three-pointers in a second-round game against Oklahoma, the most ever made in an NCAA tournament game.
- UConn's Kia Nurse made 22 three-pointers in the tournament, the most ever made in an NCAA tournament. Aari McDonald tied the record in 2021.
- Nurse made 9 threes in the 2nd round against Syracuse, the most ever made in an NCAA tournament game.

== Games ==
=== Bridgeport Regional, Bridgeport, CT ===
==== First round ====
- UConn took on the America East champion, in a first-round game between the top-seeded Huskies and the 16 seed Albany. The Huskies scored the first nine points, but the Great Danes cut the lead to three points 10–7 early in the first quarter. Despite leading 58–32 at halftime, the halftime discussion among the players was how to boost their intensity on defense. The Huskies held Albany to 23 points in the second half and went on to win the game 116–55.
- Iowa State chose to concentrate their defensive efforts on Syracuse's top two scoring threats, Britney Sykes and Alexis Peterson, but Gabby Cooper made them pay by hitting five three-pointers in the first seven minutes of the game. By the end of the first quarter, Syracuse had a 25-point lead. Although Iowa State outscored Syracuse the remainder of the game, the damage had been done and the eighth-seeded Syracuse team defeated the ninth-seeded Iowa State team 85–65. Cooper scored early for Syracuse but Sykes ended up with 28 points and Peterson with 25.
- Despite being the 12 seed, Penn dominated the fifth-seeded Texas A&M for the first three quarters of the game. The Quakers had a 21-point lead in the fourth quarter when the Aggies switched to a full-court press which turned out to be effective as it forced seven turnovers in the quarter. This, combined with their inability to shoot, missing their last 10 shots, created the greatest comeback in NCAA tournament history. The previous record was 16 points, but this game set a new record at 21 points. Texas A&M ended up with the 63–61 win over Penn.
- UCLA took on Boise State in a matchup between the 4 seed and the 13 seed. The Bruins scored 15 points before the Broncos had their first point. UCLA hit 58% of their shots and a slightly higher percentage, 59%, from beyond the arc. Billings had 19 points for the Bruins while Jordin Canada tied a school record with 16 assists, to go along with her 15 points. UCLA ended up with the win 83–56.
- Sixth-seeded West Virginia took on 11th-seeded Elon, playing in their first ever NCAA tournament. Despite having beaten Baylor in the Big 12 Conference tournament, the Mountaineers remained in a close game with the Phoenix for much of the game. The score was tied at 53 points apiece when the mountaineers ran off 10 straight points to open up a 10-point margin. Tynice Martin scored 26 points for West Virginia and Katrina Pardee hit two crucial three-pointers to help West Virginia to the 75–62 win. Elon is coached by Charlotte Smith who hit one of the most memorable shots in NCAA tournament history when she had a three-pointer in the final second of the 1994 championship game to seal the win for North Carolina.
- Oregon had not been in the tournament for 12 years but made the most of it. Seeded 10th, they took on the 7th-seeded Temple Owls in a first-round game which came down to the final seconds. The Duck's Ruthy Hebard sank a basket with 5½ seconds to go in the game that proved to be the winning basket. The Owls attempted a final shot but the freshman Hebard blocked it as time expired to give the Ducks a 71–70 victory.
- Hampton faced Duke in a first-round matchup between two teams that did not make the tournament last year. The Pirates had a "horrendous" second quarter scoring only two points against the Blue Devils 31. Rebecca Greenwell had a double double with 26 points and 10 rebounds for Duke who went on to win easily 94–31. Duke's Kyra Lambert left the game with an knee injury in the second quarter and did not return.

==== Bracket ====
First round Round of 64; March 17–18
1	UConn	116
16	Albany	55
Storrs, Connecticut (Sat/Mon)
8	Syracuse	85
9	Iowa State	65
5	Texas A&M	63
12	Penn	61
Los Angeles, California (Sat/Mon)
4	UCLA	83
13	Boise State	56
6	West Virginia	75
11	Elon	62
College Park, Maryland (Fri/Sun)
3	Maryland	103
14	Bucknell	61
7	Temple	70
10	Oregon	71
Durham, North Carolina (Sat/Mon)
2	Duke	94
15	Hampton	31

Second Round; Round of 32; March 19–20
1	UConn	94
8	Syracuse	64
5	Texas A&M	43
4	UCLA	75
6	West Virginia	56
3	Maryland	83
10	Oregon	74
2	Duke	65

Regional semifinals Sweet 16; March 25
1	UConn	86
4	UCLA	71
3	Maryland	63
10	Oregon	77

Regional Final; Elite 8 March 27
1	UConn	90
10	Oregon	52

Highlights

- The Texas A&M–Penn game saw the biggest comeback in the history of the women's tournament, as Texas A&M erased a 21-point deficit in the fourth quarter. The previous record was 16 points by Notre Dame in 2001 and Michigan State in 2005.

==== Bridgeport Regional Final ====
ESPN

March 27
7:00 PM

Summary

Connecticut 90, Oregon 52
Scoring by quarter: 28–13, 21–11, 23–19, 18–9
Pts: N. Collier 28; Rebs: N. Collier 12; Asts: K. Nurse 7	Pts: S. Ionescu 15; Rebs: S. Ionescu 8 Asts: M. Cazorla/M. McGwire 4

Webster Bank Arena, Bridgeport, CT
Attendance: 8,978
Referees: Mark Zentz, Felicia Grinter, Penny Davis

==== Bridgeport Regional All-Tournament team ====
- Napheesa Collier, Connecticut (MOP)
- Gabby Williams, Connecticut
- Saniya Chong, Connecticut
- Sabrina Ionescu, Oregon
- Jordin Canada, UCLA

=== Oklahoma City Regional, Oklahoma City, OK ===
==== First round ====
- UConn had tied the tournament record for points in a game early in the day with 116 points, but Baylor set a new record, scoring 119 points against Texas Southern, appearing in their first ever tournament. The Bears scored the first 22 points of the game before Texas Southern could score. In addition to setting a record for the highest score in an NCAA tournament game, Baylor shattered the margin of victory record, previously 74 points, by holding Texas Southern to 30 points, thus setting a new margin of victory record at 89 points.
- California opened up an early lead against LSU, extending the lead to as many as 10 points. LSU played from behind much of the game but closed the lead — the teams were tied at 50 points each with just under a minute and a half left in the game. Cal's Asha Thomas hit a three to give the Bears the lead. LSU had several chances to respond, but down by one point with 10 seconds left, LSU's Alexis Hyder drove from the left side attempting to make a game winning layup but Kristine Anigwe was there and blocked the ball. There was a scramble for the ball which resulted in two foul shots for Anigwe who hit them both to give California a 55–52 win.
- Fifth-seeded Tennessee led 12th-seeded Dayton at the end of the first quarter 20–9, but Dayton responded with a 20–9 run of their own to tie the game up to 29 points apiece at halftime. Tennessee took over again in the third quarter, but this time the Flyers were unable to respond and Tennessee finished with the win 66–57.
- Thirteenth-seeded Chattanooga kept the game close against fourth-seeded Louisville for much of the game, but the Cardinals went on a 20–6 run in the final quarter, led by Asia Durr, to open up a large lead the Mocs could never overcome. The Cardinals won 82–62.
- Oklahoma faced Gonzaga, a matchup between the 6 and 11 seeds. The Sooners started off strong and held a 13-point lead at the end of the first quarter 2 –16. That margin would match the final margin of victory, although the Bulldogs cut the lead to five points twice in the fourth quarter. Vionise Pierre-Louis was close to a triple-double for Oklahoma with 17 points, nine rebounds, and nine blocked shots. The final score was 75–62.
- Washington, the third seed, took on Montana State the 14 seed. Although Washington led early, they could not create much separation between themselves and the Bobcats. Although Montana State's Peyton Ferris was only 5'9", she was asked to play in the post. Despite the size advantage of Washington, she was effective and ended the game with 33 points. She fouled out with just under three minutes left in the game as fans of both teams gave her a standing ovation for her performance. Although Montana State kept the game reasonably close for the first 27 minutes, the Huskies eventually built a large lead and ended up with the 91–63 win.
- DePaul played Northern Iowa in a matchup between the seven and 10 seeds. The Panthers scored first, but DePaul responded with a pair of 7–0 runs to take a nine-point lead. DePaul brought Tanita Allen off the bench who hit her first five three-pointers en route to a 25-point game to help the Blue Demons win the game 88–67.
- Mississippi State took on Troy in a 2 seed versus 15 seed matchup. The Bulldogs head coach Vic Schaefer dramatically changed his lineup after the loss in the SEC championship, having three starters come in off the bench, including Victoria Vivians for the first time in her career. Blair Schaefer, the coach's daughter, recorded a career-high 21 points, helping her team to a 110–69 victory.

==== Bracket ====
First round Round of 64; March 17–18
1	Baylor	119
16	Texas Southern	30
Waco, Texas (Sat/Mon)
8	LSU	52
9	California	55
5	Tennessee	66
12	Dayton	57
Louisville, Kentucky (Sat/Mon)
4	Louisville	82
13	Chattanooga	62
6	Oklahoma	75
11	Gonzaga	62
Seattle, Washington (Sat/Mon)
3	Washington	91
14	Montana State	63
7	DePaul	88
10	Northern Iowa	67
Starkville, Mississippi (Fri/Sun)
2	Mississippi State	110
15	Troy	69

Second Round; Round of 32; March 19–20
1	Baylor	86
9	California	46
5	Tennessee	64
4	Louisville	75
6	Oklahoma	82
3	Washington	108
7	DePaul	71
2	Mississippi State	92

Regional semifinals Sweet 16; March 24
1	Baylor	97
4	Louisville	63
3	Washington	64
2	Mississippi State	75

Regional Final; Elite 8 March 26
1	Baylor	85
2	Mississippi State	94*

* – Denotes overtime period

==== Oklahoma City Regional Final ====
ESPN

March 26
7:30 PM

Summary

Baylor 85, Mississippi State 94 (OT)
Scoring by quarter: 19–21, 21–22, 21–17, 14–15, Overtime: 10–19
Pts: K. Brown 27; Rebs: K. Brown 9 Asts: A. Jones 7	Pts: M. William 41; Rebs: V. Vivians 6 Asts: M. William 7

Chesapeake Energy Arena, Oklahoma City, OK
Attendance: 3,128
Referees: Dee Kanter, Cameron Inouye, Michael McConnell

==== Oklahoma City Regional All-Tournament team ====
- Morgan William, Mississippi State (MOP)
- Victoria Vivians, Mississippi State
- Teaira McCowan, Mississippi State
- Nina Davis, Baylor
- Kalani Brown, Baylor

=== Lexington Regional, Lexington, KY ===
==== First round ====
- Robert Morris fell behind 10–0 early in the game against the top seed Notre Dame, but managed to tie the game up at 10 points apiece. However, Notre Dame had too much talent and retook the lead extending at especially in the third quarter when they shot 69% and held Robert Morris to 29%. The final margin of 30 points in the 79–49 result was the smallest margin of loss in any of the five tournament games for the Colonials.
- The ninth-seeded Purdue Boilermakers started strong against the eighth-seeded Green Bay with an early 15–0 run to open up a 17–3 lead. Although the Phoenix cut into the lead in the second quarter and second half, the boilermakers responded each time. Green Bay was within five points with 2 1/2 minutes left, but Dominique Oden hit a three-pointer, and Purdue hit many of their closing free throws to end up with the win 74–62.
- Ohio State took on Western Kentucky in a 5–12 matchup. Each team started slowly missing most of its early shots with Western Kentucky building a small lead early and still leading 18–14 late in the first quarter. The Buckeyes then ran off seven consecutive points to take a lead. Although the Lady Toppers briefly led in the second quarter, the Buckeyes had a seven-point lead at halftime. Ohio State led the rest of the way although WKU would cut the lead to six points twice. The Buckeyes ended with the win 70–63.
- Fourth-seeded Kentucky took on 13th-seeded Belmont, who came into the tournament with a 21-game winning streak, the second-longest in the nation. The Kentucky Wildcats hit 69% of their shots in the first quarter to help them open up a 10-point lead. Belmont responded by hitting seven of 9 to cut the lead to a single point. Kentucky expanded and retained the lead through most of the game, but Belmont cut the lead to a single point with just 13 seconds left in the game. Kentucky hit two free throws to extend the lead to three points, followed by a Belmont layup to get the lead back to a single point, but Kentucky hit two free throws to seal the win 73–70.
- Texas took on the Central Arkansas Sugar Bears in a matchup between the 3 and 14 seeds. Texas had lost four of their last six games to end the season so were looking for "something good to happen". Longhorns hit 63% of their field-goal attempts in the first half and pulled down rebounds when they missed, which help them open up a 28–4 lead by the end of the first quarter. They cruised to a 78–50 victory to end the Sugar Bears 17 game winning streak. Every one of the 11 players for Texas played at least 11 minutes and scored.
- Kansas State played Drake in a matchup between the 7 and 10 seeds. Normally, the game would have been played at the location of the top seed in the group, Stanford, but they had a conflict due to a gymnastics event so the hosting fell to the next highest seed. Thus, Kansas State were able to play at home for the first time since 2003. After scoring the first basket, Drake hit two three-pointers to take a 6–2 lead, but the Wildcats went on a 9–0 run to take back the lead. With a little over four minutes left in the game, the Wildcats only had a 7-point lead when Kindred Wesemann hit a three to extend the lead to double digits. Drake was unable to respond, and the Wildcats ended up with the win 67–54.
- Second-ranked Stanford faced New Mexico State in a first-round matchup between a 2 seed and a 15 seed. A 15 seed has never beaten a 2 seed in the women's NCAA tournament. The Aggie scored first and led early finishing the first quarter with a 23–20 lead. Although the Cardinal tied the game in the second quarter, New Mexico took back the lead and led 38–31 at halftime. The Cardinal started the third quarter with an 8–2 run for Stanford, but when the final quarter began New Mexico was still in the lead 49–48. New Mexico scored first in the fourth quarter with a three-pointer, but Stanford went on a run, took the lead and ended up with the win 72–64.

==== Bracket ====
First round Round of 64; March 17–18
1	Notre Dame	79
16	Robert Morris	49
Notre Dame, Indiana (Fri/Sun)
8	Green Bay	62
9	Purdue	74
5	Ohio State	70
12	Western Kentucky	63
Lexington, Kentucky (Fri/Sun)
4	Kentucky	73
13	Belmont	70
6	NC State	62
11	Auburn	48
Austin, Texas (Fri/Sun)
3	Texas	78
14	Central Arkansas	50
7	Kansas State	67
10	Drake	54
Manhattan, Kansas (Sat/Mon)
2	Stanford	72
15	New Mexico State	64

Second round Round of 32; March 19–20
1	Notre Dame	88*
9	Purdue	82
5	Ohio State	82
4	Kentucky	68
6	NC State	80
3	Texas	84
7	Kansas State	48
2	Stanford	69

Regional semifinals Sweet 16; March 24
1	Notre Dame	99
5	Ohio State	76
3	Texas	66
2	Stanford	77

Regional final Elite 8 March 26
1	Notre Dame	75
2	Stanford	76

* – Denotes overtime period

==== Lexington Regional Final ====
ESPN

March 26
12:00 PM

Summary

Stanford 76, Notre Dame 75
Scoring by quarter: 24–22, 7–23, 24–12, 21–18
Pts: B. McPhee 27; Rebs: E. McCall 11; Asts: M. Sniezek 8	Pts: A. Ogunbowale 25; Rebs: L. Allen 10; Asts: L. Allen 6

Rupp Arena, Lexington, Kentucky
Attendance: 2,527
Referees: Tina Napier, Chuck Gonzalez, Amy Bonner

==== Lexington Regional All-Tournament team ====
- Arike Ogunbowale, Notre Dame (MOP)
- Lindsay Allen, Notre Dame
- Marina Mabrey, Notre Dame
- Brittany McPhee, Stanford
- Karlie Samuelson, Stanford

=== Stockton Regional, Stockton, CA ===
==== First round ====
- South Carolina took on UNC Asheville in a matchup between the top seed and the 16 seed. Coach Staley had to make adjustments as a result of the season-ending injury to starter Alaina Coates. She started four guards along with A'ja Wilson, and then went even smaller in the second quarter. The Bulldogs were no match for the Gamecocks and South Carolina led 48–22 at halftime and went on to win the game 90–40 representing their biggest victory ever in the tournament.
- Arizona State faced Michigan State in a matchup between the eight and nine seeds. The Sun Devils' Quinn Dornstauder attempted six field goals and four free throws, making every one of them, leading to 16 points. Although Michigan State's Tori Jankoska scored 26 points she was held to two points in the first half and scored most of her points late in the game when Arizona State had a large lead. Arizona State hit 59% of the field-goal attempts in the first half leading to a 22-point margin at the break. They went on to win the game 73–61.
- Quinnipiac opened their game with an 18–4 run against fifth-seeded Marquette. The Bobcats had extended their lead to 19 points, 52–33 in the third quarter when Marquette started to come back. The Golden Eagles cut the lead to two points near the end of the game. Quinnipiac had a three-point lead in the final seconds when Marquette attempted a three-pointer to tie the game but it rimmed out to give the Bobcats their first win ever in an NCAA tournament. Jennifer Fay scored 20 points for the Bobcats. Quinnipiac ended with the win 68–65.
- Fourth-seeded Miami took on 13th-seeded Florida Gulf Coast. Miami led most of the way by as much as 13 points, but the Eagles mounted to come back and took a small lead late in the game. The game was tied with 1.5 seconds left when Keyona Hayes scored to give the hurricanes a two-point lead. Florida Gulf Coast tried to set up final play but was unable to score. Miami won the game 62–60.

==== Bracket ====
First round Round of 64; March 17–18
1	South Carolina	90
16	UNC Asheville	40
Columbia, South Carolina (Fri/Sun)
8	Arizona State	73
9	Michigan State	61
5	Marquette	65
12	Quinnipiac	68
Coral Gables, Florida (Sat/Mon)
4	Miami (FL)	62
13	Florida Gulf Coast	60
6	Missouri	66
11	South Florida	64
Tallahassee, Florida (Fri/Sun)
3	Florida State	87
14	Western Illinois	66
7	Creighton	76
10	Toledo	49
Corvallis, Oregon (Fri/Sun)
2	Oregon State	56
15	Long Beach State	55

Second Round; Round of 32; March 19–20
1	South Carolina	71
8	Arizona State	68
12	Quinnipiac	85
4	Miami (FL)	78
6	Missouri	55
3	Florida State	77
7	Creighton	52
2	Oregon State	64

Regional semifinals Sweet 16; March 25
1	South Carolina	100
12	Quinnipiac	58
3	Florida State	66
2	Oregon State	53

Regional Final; Elite 8 March 27
1	South Carolina	71
3	Florida State	64

==== Stockton Regional Final ====
ESPN

March 27
9:00 PM

Summary

South Carolina 71, Florida State 64
Scoring by quarter: 24–17, 16–12, 15–16, 16–19
Pts: K. Davis 23; Rebs: D. Cliney 7 Asts: K. Davis/A. Gray/T. Harris 2	Pts: L. Romero 16; Rebs: I. Slaughter 10; Asts: L. Romero 6

Stockton Arena, Stockton, CA
Attendance: 3,134
Referees: Lisa Jones, Bryan Brunette, Gina Cross, In'Fini Robinson

==== Stockton Regional All-Tournament team ====
- Kaela Davis, South Carolina (MOP)
- Allisha Gray, South Carolina
- A'ja Wilson, South Carolina
- Leticia Romero, Florida State
- Ivey Slaughter, Florida State

== Final Four ==
=== American Airlines Center – Dallas, TX ===
National semifinals March 31
BDP1	UConn	64
OKC2	Mississippi State	66*
LEX2	Stanford	53
SCK1	South Carolina	62

National Championship Game; April 2
OKC2	Mississippi State	55
SCK1	South Carolina	67

* – Denotes overtime period

==== National semifinals ====
ESPN2

March 31
10:02 PM

Summary

UConn 64, Mississippi State 66 (OT)
Scoring by quarter: 13–22, 15–14, 20–12, 12–12, Overtime: 4–6
Pts: G. Williams 21; Rebs: N. Collier/G. Williams 8 Asts: S. Chong 5	Pts: V. Vivians 19; Rebs: T. McCowan 8 Asts: M. William 6

American Airlines Center – Dallas, Texas
Attendance: 19,200
Referees: Lisa Jones, Jesse Dickerson, Maj Forsberg

ESPN2

March 31
7:30 PM

Summary

Stanford 53, South Carolina 62
Scoring by quarter: 12–14, 17–6, 8–21, 16–21
Pts: E. McCall/A. Smith 14; Rebs: E. McCall 14; Asts: M. Sniezek 6	Pts: A. Gray 18; Rebs: A. Wilson 19; Asts: A. Wilson 4

American Airlines Center – Dallas, Texas
Attendance: 19,200
Referees: Joe Vaszily, Felicia Grinter, Michol Murray

==== National championship ====
ESPN

April 2
6:00 pm

Mississippi State 55, South Carolina 67
Scoring by quarter: 14–18, 12–18, 18–16, 11–15
Pts: V. Vivians 12; Rebs: T. McCowan 10; Asts: M. William 4	Pts: A. Wilson 23; Rebs: A. Wilson/A. Gray 10; Asts: B. Cuevas-Moore/A. Gray/T. Harris 2

American Airlines Center – Dallas, Texas
Referees: Dee Kantner, Tina Napier, Brenda Pantoja

==== Final Four All-Tournament team ====
- A'ja Wilson, South Carolina (MOP)
- Allisha Gray, South Carolina
- Morgan William, Mississippi State
- Victoria Vivians, Mississippi State
- Gabby Williams, UConn

== Record by conference ==
Conference	Bids	Record	Win %	R64	R32	S16	E8	F4	CG	NC
SEC	8	15–7	.682	8	6	2	2	2	2	1
Pac-12	7	15–7	.682	7	7	5	2	1	–	–
American	3	4–3	.571	3	1	1	1	1	–	–
ACC	7	12–7	.632	7	7	3	2	–	–	–
Big 12	6	8–6	.571	6	5	2	1	–	–	–
Big Ten	4	5–4	.556	4	3	2	–	–	–	–
MAAC	1	2–1	.667	1	1	1	–	–	–	–
Big East	3	2–3	.400	3	2	–	–	–	–	–
Missouri Valley	2	0–2	.000	2	–	–	–	–	–	–

- The R64, R32, S16, E8, F4, CG, and NC columns indicate how many teams from each conference were in the round of 64 (first round), round of 32 (second round), Sweet 16, Elite Eight, Final Four, championship game, and national champion, respectively.
- The America East, Atlantic 10, Atlantic Sun, Big Sky, Big South, Big West, Conference USA, Colonial (CAA), Horizon, Ivy League, MEAC, Mid-American (MAC), Mountain West, Northeast, Ohio Valley, Patriot, Southern, Southland, Summit, Sun Belt, SWAC, WAC and West Coast conferences each had one representative that was eliminated in the first round.

== Media coverage ==
=== Television ===
ESPN had US television rights to all games during the tournament. For the first and second rounds, ESPN aired select games nationally on ESPN2, ESPNU, or ESPNews. All other games aired regionally on ESPN, ESPN2, or ESPN3 and were streamed online via WatchESPN. Most of the nation got whip-a-round coverage during this time, which allowed ESPN to rotate between the games and focus the nation on the game that had the closest score. The Lexington and Oklahoma City regional semifinals aired concurrently on ESPN and ESPN2, while ESPN televised the Bridgeport and Stockton regional semifinals and all four regional finals. The national semifinals aired on ESPN2, and the national championship on ESPN.

==== Studio host and analysts ====
- Maria Taylor (Host)
- Rebecca Lobo (Analyst)
- Andy Landers (Analyst)

==== Broadcast assignments ====
First & Second Rounds Friday/Sunday

- Courtney Lyle and Tamika Catchings – College Park, Maryland
- Roy Philpott and Brooke Weisbrod – Austin, Texas
- Beth Mowins and Nell Fortner – Lexington, Kentucky
- Bob Picozzi and Katie Smith – Starkville, Mississippi
- Dave Pasch and LaChina Robinson – Columbia, South Carolina
- Paul Sunderland and Mike Thibault – Notre Dame, Indiana
- Elise Woodward and Mary Murphy – Corvallis, Oregon
- Melissa Lee and Angel Gray – Tallahassee, Florida

Sweet Sixteen & Elite Eight Friday/Sunday

- Pam Ward, Gail Goestenkors, and Kaylee Hartung – Oklahoma City, Oklahoma
- Beth Mowins, Debbie Antonelli, and Allison Williams – Lexington, Kentucky

Final Four

- Dave O'Brien, Doris Burke, Kara Lawson, and Holly Rowe – Dallas, Texas

First & Second Rounds Saturday/Monday

- Eric Frede and Dan Hughes – Storrs, Connecticut
- Dave O'Brien, Doris Burke, and Kara Lawson – Louisville, Kentucky
- Brenda VanLengen and Carol Ross – Manhattan, Kansas
- Jenn Hildreth and Steffi Sorensen – Coral Gables, Florida
- Lowell Galindo and Sue Bird – Waco, Texas
- Pam Ward and Gail Goestenkors – Seattle, Washington
- Sam Gore and Julianne Viani – Los Angeles, California
- Clay Matvick and Christy Winters-Scott – Durham, North Carolina

Sweet Sixteen & Elite Eight Saturday/Monday

- Dave O'Brien, Doris Burke, Kara Lawson, and Holly Rowe – Bridgeport, Connecticut
- Dave Pasch, LaChina Robinson, and Molly McGrath – Stockton, California

Championship

- Dave O'Brien, Doris Burke, Kara Lawson, and Holly Rowe – Dallas, Texas

=== Radio ===
Westwood One has exclusive radio rights to the entire tournament. Teams participating in the Regional Finals, Final Four, and championship are allowed to have their own local broadcasts, but they are not allowed to stream those broadcasts online.

Regional Finals Sunday

- Mark Hauser and Kristen Kozlowski – Lexington, Kentucky
- Ted Emrich and Julianne Viani – Oklahoma City, Oklahoma

Final Four

- John Sadak, Debbie Antonelli, and Krista Blunk – Dallas, Texas

Regional Finals Monday

- John Sadak and Debbie Antonelli – Bridgeport, Connecticut
- Dick Fain and Krista Blunk – Stockton, California

Championship

- John Sadak, Debbie Antonelli, and Krista Blunk – Dallas, Texas

== See also ==
- 2017 NCAA Division I men's basketball tournament
