= 2017 Big West Conference women's basketball tournament =

- Classification: Division I
- Season: 2016–17
- Teams: 8
- Site: Walter Pyramid; Honda Center; Long Beach, CA; Anaheim, CA
- Champions: Long Beach State (5th title)
- Winning coach: Jody Wynn (1st title)
- MVP: Anna Kim (Long Beach State)
- Attendance: 3,328
- Television: ESPN3; Prime Ticket

2016–17 Big West women's basketball standings
	Conf.				Overall
Team	W		L	PCT	W		L	PCT
UC Davis	14	–	2	.875	25	–	8	.758
Long Beach State †	12	–	4	.750	23	–	12	.657
Cal State Northridge	10	–	6	.625	18	–	14	.563
UC Riverside	9	–	7	.563	16	–	15	.516
UC Santa Barbara	9	–	7	.563	16	–	16	.500
Hawaii	7	–	9	.438	12	–	18	.400
Cal Poly	7	–	9	.438	11	–	18	.379
UC Irvine	3	–	13	.188	5	–	26	.161
Cal State Fullerton	1	–	15	.063	4	–	25	.138
† 2017 Big West tournament winner As of March 23, 2017; Rankings from AP poll

The 2017 Big West Conference women's basketball tournament took place March 7–11, 2017, at two venues in the Los Angeles area. The first two rounds were scheduled for Walter Pyramid in Long Beach, while the semifinals and championship were held at the Honda Center in Anaheim. The winner of the tournament received the conference's automatic bid to the 2017 NCAA Women's Division I Basketball Tournament.

Long Beach State defeated UC Santa Barbara, 56–55, in the championship game.

== Seeds ==
Seed	School	Conference	Overall	Tiebreaker
1	UC Davis	14–2	23–6	
2	Long Beach State	12–4	21–10	
3	Northridge State	10–6	15–14	
4	UC Santa Barbara	9–7	14–15	1–1 vs. Long Beach State
5	UC Riverside	9–7	15–14	0–2 vs. Long Beach State
6	Hawaii	7–9	11–17	2–0 vs. Cal Poly
7	Cal Poly	7–9	11–17	0–2 vs. Hawaii
8	UC Irvine	3–13	4–25	

== Schedule ==
Session	Game	Time*	Matchup^{#}	Television	Attendance
First round – Wednesday, March 7
1	1	6:00 PM	#5 UC Riverside vs #8 UC Irvine	ESPN3	553
1	2	8:30 PM	#6 Hawaii vs #7 Cal Poly	ESPN3	553
Quarterfinals – Thursday, March 8
2	3	6:00 PM	#3 Cal State Northridge vs. #6 Hawaii	ESPN3	632
2	4	8:30 PM	#4 UC Santa Barbara vs #5 UC Riverside	ESPN3	632
Semifinals – Friday, March 10
3	5	12:00 PM	#1 UC Davis vs. #4 UC Santa Barbara	ESPN3	931
3	6	2:30 PM	#2 Long Beach State vs #3 Cal State Northridge	ESPN3	931
Championship Game – Saturday, March 11
4	7	4:00 PM	#2 Long Beach State vs #4 UC Santa Barbara	Prime Ticket	1,212
*Game Times in PT. #-Rankings denote tournament seeding.

== Bracket ==
First round (Re-Seeded); Tuesday, March 7 ESPN3
5	UC Riverside	92
8	UC Irvine	60
6	Hawaii	71
7	Cal Poly	50

Quarterfinals (Re-Seeded); Wednesday, March 8 ESPN3
4	UC Santa Barbara	81
5	UC Riverside	71
3	Cal State Northridge	71
6	Hawaii	64

Semifinals (Re-Seeded); Friday, March 10; ESPN3
1	UC Davis	59
4	UCSB	73
2	Long Beach State	61
3	Cal State Northridge	60

Championship game Saturday, March 11; Prime Ticket
4	UCSB	55
2	Long Beach State	56

== See also ==
- 2017 Big West Conference men's basketball tournament
