= Jody Wynn =

American basketball coach

Biographical details
- Born: February 21, 1974 (age 52); Newport Beach, California
- Education: USC

Playing career
- 1993–1996: USC

Coaching career (HC unless noted)
- 1996–2004: Pepperdine (assistant)
- 2004–2009: USC (assistant)
- 2009–2017: Long Beach State
- 2017–2021: Washington

Head coaching record
- Overall: 155–163

Jody Wynn (née Anton, born February 21, 1974) is an American women's basketball coach. She was head coach at the University of Washington from 2017 to 2021 and at Long Beach State from 2009 to 2017.

== High school ==
Wynn was a prep standout in high school in Southern California. Her initial plans were to concentrate on swimming in high school with the goal of becoming an Olympic swimmer. However, while still in fifth grade, she was playing basketball when the head coach of the high school team approached her with some shooting tips and encouraged her to think about playing basketball when she reached high school.

Wynn enrolled at Brea-Olinda High School, where she gave up swimming and water polo to commit to playing basketball, starting every game in winning three straight state championships. Although she was the tallest player on the team he had her playing at the two guard position. She earned the CIF-Southern Section and Orange County Player of the Year honors in 1991 and 1992. She was also tabbed a USA Today and Street & Smith's Honorable-Mention All-American.

Wynn played forward and was a four-year starter on the varsity squad. She scored 16 points per game as a senior. In her four years, the team had a 129–6 record and won three California state championships.

== College ==
Wynn earned her bachelor's degree from the University of Southern California in 1996, and in 2000, she completed a master's degree at Pepperdine University.

During her collegiate playing career (1993–96), the USC Trojans earned a cumulative record of 79-35 (.693). This team, which was headlined by notable WNBA players Lisa Leslie and Tina Thompson, won the 1994 Pac-10 Conference Championship.

The Trojans made three consecutive NCAA Tournament appearances from 1993 to 1995. During this time, Wynn played under three head coaches – Marianne Stanley (1993), Cheryl Miller (1994–95) and Fred Williams (1996) – in a four-year span. Wynn's best statistical season was during her junior year, where she started in 27 games and averaged 8.2 points, 5.0 rebounds, and 3.0 assists per contest. Her senior year at USC was cut short by career-ending ankle surgery.

== Coaching career ==
After her playing career ended, Wynn began her coaching career at Pepperdine University. She stayed on the staff at Pepperdine for 8 seasons, before moving on to her alma mater, USC, where she spent an additional 5 years as an assistant coach.

On April 7, 2009, Wynn was named head coach of the Long Beach State women's basketball program. during her tenure, Long Beach State had its first winning season in nine seasons. She went on to lead the team to three Women's NIT appearances, and culminated her time in Long Beach with an NCAA tournament appearance in her 8th season at the helm.

On April 14, 2017, she was named head coach of the Washington women's basketball program. Wynn was fired by the University of Washington on March 15, 2021.

After her time in the collegiate coaching ranks, Wynn was named the basketball coach at Mater Dei High School in Santa Ana, CA, after spending one year as an assistant on the varsity staff.

== Head coaching record ==
Record table
Season	Team	Overall	Conference	Standing	Postseason
Long Beach State Beach (Big West Conference) (2009–2017)
2009–10	Long Beach State	13–17	9–7	T–4th	
2010–11	Long Beach State	8–23	6–10	6th	
2011–12	Long Beach State	14–18	7–9	7th	
2012–13	Long Beach State	16–16	9–9	5th	
2013–14	Long Beach State	17–15	8–8	T–6th	
2014–15	Long Beach State	22–10	9–7	4th	
2015–16	Long Beach State	24–9	12–4	T–2nd	
2016–17	Long Beach State	23–11	12–4	2nd	NCAA Division I First Round
Long Beach State:		137–119 (.535)	72–58 (.554)		
Washington Huskies (Pac–12 Conference) (2017–Present)
2017–18	Washington	7–23	1–17	12th	
2018–19	Washington	11–21	2–15	11th	
2019–20	Washington	13–16	5–13	T–9th	
Washington:		31–60 (.341)	8–45 (.151)		
Total:		168–179 (.484)			
National champion Postseason invitational champion Conference regular season champion Conference regular season and conference tournament champion Division regular season champion Division regular season and conference tournament champion Conference tournament champion

== Personal life ==
In 2000, Jody married Derek Wynn. They have two daughters.

Before taking up basketball, Wynn competed in girls water polo and open-water swimming events.
