= 2017 NCAA Division I women's basketball championship game =

2017 NCAA Tournament Championship Game
National championship game
Mississippi State Bulldogs	South Carolina Gamecocks
SEC	SEC
(34–4)	(32–4)
55	67
Head coach: Vic Schaefer	Head coach: Dawn Staley
- AP: 7
- Coaches: 7
- AP: 4
- Coaches: 3
	1	2	3	4	Total
Mississippi State Bulldogs	14	12	18	11	55
South Carolina Gamecocks	18	18	16	15	67
- Date: April 2, 2017
- Venue: American Airlines Center, Dallas, Texas
- MVP: A'ja Wilson, South Carolina
- Referees: Dee Kantner; Tina Napier; Brenda Pantoja
- Attendance: 19,229
- National anthem: Olivia Kay

United States TV coverage
- Network: ESPN
- Announcers: Dave O'Brien (play-by-play); Doris Burke (analyst); Kara Lawson (analyst); Holly Rowe (sideline)
- Nielsen Ratings: 0.81 (3.83 million)

The 2017 NCAA Division I women's basketball championship game was the final game of the 2017 NCAA Division I women's basketball tournament. The game was played on April 2, 2017, at the American Airlines Center in Dallas, Texas, and was contested between the Mississippi State Bulldogs and the South Carolina Gamecocks, both of which are from the Southeastern Conference (SEC). South Carolina defeated Mississippi State, 67–55, to claim their first-ever national championship.

== Participants ==
Going into the game, South Carolina and Mississippi State have met 35 times in women's basketball since December 29, 1984, with the Gamecocks holding a one-game edge over the Bulldogs in Southeastern Conference (SEC) play. In the 2016–17 SEC regular season, South Carolina lost twice and Mississippi State three times (once to the Gamecocks). Notched as the top two seeds for the 2017 SEC tournament, the teams advanced to the championship game, where South Carolina won 59–49.

In the Final Four of the tournament, South Carolina defeated Stanford, 62–53. In the other semifinal game, Mississippi State defeated Connecticut with a buzzer beater, winning 66–64, and ending Connecticut's 111-game winning streak.

== Game summary ==
ESPN

Sunday, April 2
6:00 pm EDT

Mississippi State 55, South Carolina 67
Scoring by quarter: 14–18, 12–18, 18–16, 11–15
Pts: V. Vivians 12; Rebs: T. McCowan 10; Asts: M. William 4	Pts: A. Wilson 23; Rebs: A. Wilson/A. Gray 10; Asts: B. Cuevas-Moore/A. Gray/T. Harris 2

American Airlines Center – Dallas, Texas
Attendance: 19,229
Referees: Dee Kantner, Tina Napier, Brenda Pantoja

South Carolina led 36–26 at half time and extended this lead further in the beginning of the third quarter. Mississippi State then rallied, and at one point trailed by only 4 points (54–50). However, South Carolina never relinquished their lead, and held on to win, ultimately by 12 points. The South Carolina strategy was to focus on close shots, with the team only attempting three 3-pointers in the entire game.

A'ja Wilson was South Carolina's top scorer with 23 points. Mississippi State guard Morgan William, who had excelled previously in the tournament, was benched for much of the game, scoring 8 points in 23 minutes of playing time.

== Media coverage ==
The Championship Game was televised in the United States by ESPN. Dave O'Brien gave the play-by-play, with Doris Burke and Kara Lawson as the color analysts, and Holly Rowe as the sideline reporter. Maria Taylor, Rebecca Lobo and Andy Landers provided studio coverage.

== See also ==
- 2017 NCAA Men's Division I Basketball Championship Game
- 2017 NCAA Women's Division I Basketball Tournament
