= 2016–17 UT Martin Skyhawks women's basketball team =

Intercollegiate basketball season

2016–17 UT Martin Skyhawks women's basketball
- Conference: Ohio Valley Conference
- Record: 12–19 (8–8 OVC)
- Head coach: Kevin McMillan (8th season)
- Assistant coaches: David Russell (7th season); David Hart (6th season); Jasmine Newsome (2nd season)
- Home arena: Skyhawk Arena

2016–17 Ohio Valley Conference women's basketball standings
	Conf.				Overall
Team	W		L	PCT	W		L	PCT
Belmont	16	–	0	1.000	27	–	5	.844
Morehead State	11	–	5	.688	21	–	9	.700
SIU Edwardsville	9	–	7	.563	14	–	18	.438
Austin Peay	8	–	8	.500	14	–	16	.467
UT Martin	8	–	8	.500	12	–	20	.375
Murray State	7	–	9	.438	15	–	14	.517
Southeast Missouri State	7	–	9	.438	13	–	17	.433
Eastern Kentucky	7	–	9	.438	13	–	19	.406
Tennessee Tech	7	–	9	.438	10	–	20	.333
Jacksonville State	6	–	10	.375	13	–	15	.464
Tennessee State	5	–	11	.313	10	–	16	.385
Eastern Illinois	5	–	11	.313	9	–	19	.321
† 2017 OVC tournament winner As of March 4, 2017; Rankings from AP poll

The 2016–17 UT Martin Skyhawks women's basketball team represented University of Tennessee at Martin during the 2016–17 NCAA Division I women's basketball season. The Skyhawks, led by eighth year head coach Kevin McMillan, played their home games at Skyhawk Arena as members of the Ohio Valley Conference (OVC). The team finished the season with a 12–19 overall, 8–8 OVC record in a fourth-place tie.

== Schedule and results ==
Date time, TV	Rank^{#}	Opponent^{#}	Result	Record	Site (attendance) city, state
Non–conference regular season
11/11/2016*; 5:30 pm, OVCDN		Louisville	W 100-57	0–1	Skyhawk Arena (5,754); Martin, TN
11/14/2017*; 5:30 pm		at North Carolina A&T	W 74-59	0–2	Corbett Sports Center (517); Greensboro, NC
11/16/2016*; 7:00 pm		Western Carolina	W 84-72	1-2	Ramsey Center (791); Cullowhee, NC
11/18/2016*; 11:00 am		at Ohio	L 55-72	1-3	Convocation Center (3,241); Athens, OH
11/23/2016*; 12:00 pm		at Samford	W 69-62	1-4	Pete Hanna Center (223); Birmingham, AL
11/27/2016*; 2:00 pm, OVCDN		Vanderbilt	W 79-77	1-5	Skyhawk Arena (2,137); Martin, TN
11/29/2016*; 5:30 pm, OVCDN		Southern Illinois	W 76-68	2-5	Skyhawk Arena (1,647); Martin, TN
12/03/2016*; 6:00 pm, OVCDN		Chattanooga	W 80-60	2-6	Skyhawk Arena (1,123); Martin, TN
12/10/2016*; 12:30 pm		at Oral Roberts	W 82-53	2-7	Mabee Center (415); Tulsa, OK
12/14/2016*; 11:00 am, OVCDN		Arkansas State	W 68-63	3-7	Skyhawk Arena (4,114); Martin, TN
12/17/2016*; 11:30 am		at Missouri	W 80-69	3-8	Mizzou Arena (2,545); Columbia, MO
12/20/2016*; 7:00 pm		at #22 DePaul	W 100-68	3-9	McGrath-Phillips Arena (2,122); Chicago, IL
12/22/2016*; 2:00 pm		at Northwestern	W 82-59	3-10	Welsh-Ryan Arena (709); Evanston, IL
Ohio Valley Conference regular season
12/29/2016; 5:30 pm, OVCDN		Jacksonville State	W 94-83	4-10 (1-0)	Skyhawk Arena (1,877); Martin, TN
12/31/2016; 4:00 pm, OVCDN		Morehead State	W 89-68	4-11 (1-1)	Skyhawk Arena (1,841); Martin, TN
01/05/2017; 4:00 pm, OVCDN		at Belmont	W 71-66	4-12 (1-2)	Curb Event Center (1,046); Nashville, TN
01/06/2017; 5:00 pm, OVCDN		at Tennessee State	W 85-80 OT	4-13 (1-3)	Gentry Center (623); Nashville, TN
01/14/2017; 4:00 pm, OVCDN		Southeast Missouri	W 82-79	4-14 (1-4)	Skyhawk Arena (2,377); Martin, TN
01/18/2017; 6:00 pm, OVCDN		at Eastern Illinois	W 80-70 OT	4-15 (1-5)	Lantz Arena (228); Charleston, Illinois
01/21/2017; 7:00 pm, OVCDN		at SIU Edwardsville	W 70-68 OT	4-16 (1-6)	Skyhawk Arena (2,101); Martin, TN
01/25/2017; 6:00 pm, OVCDN		Austin Peay	W 83-80	5-16 (2-6)	Skyhawk Arena (1,097); Martin, TN
01/28/2017; 5:00 pm, OVCDN		at Murray State	W 90-70	6-16 (3-6)	CFSB Center (817); Murray, KY
02/01/2017; 5:30 pm, OVCDN		Tennessee Tech	W 81-71	6-17 (3-7)	Eblen Center (792); Cookeville, Tennessee
02/03/2017; 4:00 pm, OVCDN		Eastern Kentucky	W 66-56	7-17 (4-7)	Skyhawk Arena (2,005); Martin, TN
02/08/2018; 4:30 pm, OVCDN		Eastern Illinois	W 74-72	8-17 (5-7)	Skyhawk Arena (1,014); Martin, TN
02/11/2017; 4:00 pm, OVCDN		SIU Edwardsville	W 82-72	9-17 (6-7)	Vadalabene Center (688); Edwardsville, Illinois
02/18/2018; 1:30 pm, OVCDN		Southeast Missouri State	W 82-73	10-17 (7-7)	Show Me Center (1,003); Cape Girardeau, MO
02/22/2017; 7:00 pm, OVCDN		at Austin Peay	W 85-60	10-18 (7-8)	Dunn Center (1,561); Clarksville, TN
02/24/2018; 2:00 pm, OVCDN		Murray State	W 83-82	11-18 (8-8)	Skyhawk Arena (2,901); Martin, TN
Ohio Valley Conference tournament
03/2/2017; 1:00 pm, ESPN3/OVCDN	(#4)	vs. (#5) Austin Peay; First Round	W 59-43	12-18	Municipal Auditorium (645); Nashville, TN
03/03/2018; 2:00 pm, ESPN3/OVCDN	(#4)	vs. (#1) Belmont; Semifinals	W 83-62	12-19	Municipal Auditorium (730); Nashville, TN
*Non-conference game. ^{#}Rankings from AP Poll. (#) Tournament seedings in parentheses. All times are in Central Time.
