= Morgan William =

American basketball player

Free agent
- Position: Point guard

Personal information
- Born: July 14, 1996 (age 30)
- Listed height: 5 ft 5 in (1.65 m)

Career information
- High school: Shades Valley (Irondale, Alabama)
- College: Mississippi State (2014–2018)
- WNBA draft: 2018: undrafted

Career highlights
- SEC All-Freshman Team (2015)

Morgan William (born July 14, 1996) is an American women's college basketball player who previously played for the Mississippi State Bulldogs. She helped lead the Bulldogs to four appearances in the NCAA tournament, including three Sweet Sixteens, and two appearances in the championship game, 2017 and 2018. She is best known for a buzzer-beating shot to beat Connecticut in the 2017 Final Four, ending the Huskies' 111-game winning streak.

== Mississippi State statistics ==
Legend
GP	Games played	GS	Games started	MPG	Minutes per game
FG%	Field goal percentage	3P%	3-point field goal percentage	FT%	Free throw percentage
RPG	Rebounds per game	APG	Assists per game	SPG	Steals per game
BPG	Blocks per game	PPG	Points per game	**Bold**	Career high

Year	Team	GP	Points	FG%	3P%	FT%	RPG	APG	SPG	BPG	PPG
2014-15	Mississippi State	34	309	35.4%	32.1%	84.2%	1.8	3.6	1.4	0.2	9.1
2015-16	Mississippi State	36	349	32.1%	27.3%	84.4%	**2.3**	**4.9**	1.1	0.2	9.7
2016-17	Mississippi State	**39**	**424**	**46.3%**	**36.2%**	84.2%	2.1	4.6	**1.5**	0.2	**10.9**
2017-18	Mississippi State	**39**	318	40.8%	29.4%	**86.3%**	1.6	4.5	0.8	**0.2**	8.2
Career		148	1400	38.7%	31.1%	84.7%	1.9	4.4	1.2	0.2	9.5
