= 2017 Big South Conference women's basketball tournament =

- Classification: Division I
- Season: 2016–17
- Teams: 10
- Site: Vines Center; Lynchburg, Virginia
- Champions: UNC Asheville (3rd title)
- Winning coach: Brenda Mock Kirkpatrick (2nd title)
- MVP: Sonora Dengokl (UNC Asheville)
- Attendance: 3,599

2016–17 Big South women's basketball standings
	Conf.				Overall
Team	W		L	PCT	W		L	PCT
Radford	14	–	4	.778	24	–	9	.727
Campbell	13	–	5	.722	21	–	8	.724
High Point	13	–	5	.722	15	–	14	.517
Liberty	12	–	6	.667	11	–	16	.407
Charleston Southern	11	–	7	.611	16	–	12	.571
Presbyterian	10	–	8	.556	12	–	17	.414
UNC Asheville†	9	–	9	.500	18	–	15	.545
Gardner-Webb	6	–	12	.333	11	–	17	.393
Winthrop	1	–	17	.056	2	–	28	.067
Longwood	1	–	17	.056	4	–	25	.138
† 2017 Big South tournament winner As of March 17, 2017; Rankings from AP poll

The 2017 Big South women's basketball tournament was a postseason women's basketball tournament for the Big South Conference that took place March 9–12, 2017, at the Vines Center in Lynchburg, Virginia, United States. All rounds after the first were broadcast on ESPN3, and the first round was broadcast on Big South Network. UNC Asheville won their 3rd Big South tournament title and earned an automatic bid to the NCAA women's tournament.

== Format ==
All 10 teams were eligible for the tournament.

== Seeds ==
Seed	School	Conference	Overall	Tiebreaker
1	Radford	14-4	22-7	
2	Campbell	13-5	21-8	2-0 vs. High Point
3	High Point	13-5	15-14	
4	Liberty	12-6	13-17	
5	Charleston Southern	11-7	18-12	
6	Presbyterian	10-8	12-17	
7	UNC Asheville	9-9	16-14	
8	Gardner-Webb	6-12	12-19	
9	Winthrop	1-17	2-29	(at least by RPI rankings)
10	Longwood	1-17	4-26	
‡ – Big South regular season champion. Overall records are as of the end of the regular season.

== Schedule ==
Session	Game	Time*	Matchup^{#}	Television	Attendance
First round - Thursday, March 9
1	1	6:00 pm	#8 Gardner-Webb vs. #9 Winthrop	BSN	621
1	2	8:00 pm	#7 UNC Asheville vs. #10 Longwood	BSN	621
Quarterfinals - Friday, March 10
2	3	12:00 pm	#1 Radford vs. #8 Gardner-Webb	ESPN3	852
2	4	2:00 pm	#4 Liberty vs. #5 Charleston Southern	ESPN3	852
3	5	6:00 pm	#2 Campbell vs. #7 UNC-Asheville	ESPN3	640
3	6	8:00 pm	#3 High Point vs. #6 Presbyterian	ESPN3	640
Semifinals - Saturday, March 11
4	7	2:00 pm	#1 Radford vs #5 Charleston Southern	ESPN3	692
4	8	4:00 pm	#7 UNC Asheville vs #6 Presbyterian	ESPN3	692
Championship Game - Sunday, March 12
5	9	4:00 pm	#1 Radford vs. #7 UNC Asheville	ESPN3	794

*Game times in Eastern Time. #Rankings denote tournament seeding.

== Bracket ==
First round March 9, 2017
8	Gardner-Webb	82
9	Winthrop	43
7	UNC Asheville	65
10	Longwood	59

Quarterfinals; March 10, 2017
1	Radford	54
8	Gardner-Webb	51
4	Liberty	50
5	Charleston Southern	52
2	Campbell	55
7	UNC Asheville	64
3	High Point	48
6	Presbyterian	55

Semifinals; March 11, 2017
1	Radford	53
5	Charleston Southern	50
7	UNC Asheville	56
6	Presbyterian	55

Championship; March 12, 2017
1	Radford	48
7	UNC Asheville	49

== See also ==
- 2017 Big South Conference men's basketball tournament
