= 2017 Horizon League women's basketball tournament =

- Classification: Division I
- Season: 2016–17
- Teams: 10
- Site: Joe Louis Arena; Detroit, Michigan
- Champions: Green Bay (15th title)
- Winning coach: Kevin Borseth (11th title)
- MVP: Jessica Lindstrom (Green Bay)

2016–17 Horizon League women's basketball standings
	Conf.				Overall
Team	W		L	PCT	W		L	PCT
Green Bay*^{†}	15	–	3	.833	27	–	5	.844
Wright State	15	–	3	.833	24	–	8	.750
Oakland	12	–	6	.667	18	–	12	.600
Detroit	12	–	6	.667	18	–	14	.563
Milwaukee	11	–	7	.611	20	–	11	.645
Cleveland State	9	–	9	.500	14	–	16	.467
Youngstown State	5	–	13	.278	9	–	21	.300
Northern Kentucky	5	–	13	.278	9	–	22	.290
Valparaiso	4	–	14	.222	10	–	20	.333
UIC	2	–	16	.111	6	–	24	.200
† 2017 Horizon League Tournament winner * Tournament #1 seed As of March 7, 2017; Rankings from AP poll

The 2017 Horizon League women's basketball tournament (also known as Motor City Madness) was the conference tournament that ended the 2016–17 season of the Horizon League. It was played from March 3 through March 7, 2017, at Joe Louis Arena in Detroit. Regular-season co-champion Green Bay won the tournament and earned the Horizon League's automatic berth into the 2017 NCAA women's tournament.

== Seeds ==
All 10 teams participated in the tournament. The top six teams received a bye into the Second round. This was a change from the previous season where the top two seeds received double byes into the Semifinals. Teams were seeded by record within the conference, with a tiebreaker system to seed teams with identical conference records.

Seed	School	Conference	Tiebreaker
1	Green Bay	15–3	2–0 vs. Wright State
2	Wright State	15–3	0–2 vs. Green Bay
3	Detroit Mercy	12–6	2–0 vs. Oakland
4	Oakland	12–6	0–2 vs. Detroit
5	Milwaukee	11–7	
6	Cleveland State	9–9	
7	Northern Kentucky	5–13	1–1 vs. YSU, 1–1 vs. Milwaukee
8	Youngstown State	5–13	1–1 vs. NKU, 0–2 vs. Milwaukee
9	Valparaiso	4–14	
10	UIC	2–16	

== Schedule ==
Game	Time	Matchup	Final score	Television
First round – Friday, March 3
1	2:30 PM	#8 Youngstown State vs #9 Valparaiso	79–62	ESPN3
2	Noon	#7 Northern Kentucky vs #10 UIC	72–60	ESPN3
Second round – Saturday, March 4
3	11:30 AM	#1 Green Bay vs #9 Valparaiso	89-60	ESPN3
4	2:00 PM	#2 Wright State vs #10 UIC	79-52	ESPN3
Second round – Sunday, March 5
5	2:30 PM	#4 Oakland vs. #5 Milwaukee	82-60	ESPN3
6	Noon	#3 Detroit Mercy vs #6 Cleveland State	70-56	ESPN3
Semifinals – Monday, March 6
7	1:00 PM	#1 Green Bay vs. #5 Milwaukee	66–59	ESPN3
8	3:30 PM	#2 Wright State vs. #3 Detroit Mercy	71–52	ESPN3
Finals – Tuesday, March 7
9	Noon	#1 Green Bay vs. #3 Detroit Mercy	64–52	ESPNU
All game times in Eastern Time Zone.

== Bracket ==
First round Friday, March 3
8	Youngstown State	62
9	Valparaiso	79
7	Northern Kentucky	60
10	UIC	72

Second round Saturday/Sunday, March 4/5
1	Green Bay	89
9	Valparaiso	60
4	Oakland	60
5	Milwaukee	82
3	Detroit Mercy	70
6	Cleveland State	56
2	Wright State	79
10	UIC	52

Semifinals; Monday, March 6
1	Green Bay	66
5	Milwaukee	59
3	Detroit Mercy	71
2	Wright State	52

Finals; Tuesday, March 7
1	Green Bay	64
3	Detroit Mercy	52
