= Rob Cross (basketball) =

American basketball coach

Coaching career (HC unless noted)
- 1995–2008: Murray State (asst.)
- 2008–2017: Murray State

Head coaching record
- Overall: 120–147 (.449)

Accomplishments and honors

Championships
- OVC regular season championship (2009)

Awards
- OVC Coach of the Year (2009)

Rob Cross is an American former college basketball coach. He was the head coach of the Murray State Racers women's basketball team for nine seasons, leaving as the winningest coach in the programs history.

== Early life ==
Cross graduated from Murray State University with a degree in music in 1991 and subsequently worked as an associate high school band director.

== Career ==
He served as assistant coach of the Racers from 1995 through 2008, before serving as head coach until 2017. In 2009, he was named Ohio Valley Conference Coach of the Year after his team won the regular season championship.

== Head coaching record ==
Record table
Season	Team	Overall	Conference	Standing	Postseason
Murray State University (Ohio Valley Conference) (2008–2017)
2008–09	Murray State	23–9	16–2	1st	1–1 (WNIT)
2009–10	Murray State	13–17	8–10	4th tie	
2010–11	Murray State	9–21	5–13	7th tie	
2011–12	Murray State	13–18	8–8	5th	
2012–13	Murray State	16–13	8–8	4th West	
2013–14	Murray State	11–17	4–12	6th West	
2014–15	Murray State	8–21	3–13	t-10th	
2015–16	Murray State	12–17	7–9	t-7th	
2016–17	Murray State	15–14	7–11	8th	
Total:		120–147 (.449)			
National champion Postseason invitational champion Conference regular season champion Conference regular season and conference tournament champion Division regular season champion Division regular season and conference tournament champion Conference tournament champion
