= 2017 SWAC women's basketball tournament =

- Classification: Division I
- Season: 2016–17
- Teams: 8
- Site: Toyota Center; Houston, Texas
- First round site: Campus sites
- Champions: Texas Southern (1st title)
- Winning coach: Johnetta Hayes-Perry (1st title)
- MVP: Joyce Kennerson (Texas Southern)
- Television: ESPN3

2016–17 SWAC women's basketball standings
	Conf.				Overall
Team	W		L	PCT	W		L	PCT
Grambling State	14	–	4	.778	16	–	13	.552
Texas Southern†	14	–	4	.778	20	–	9	.690
Alabama State	12	–	5	.706	13	–	14	.481
Southern	11	–	7	.611	13	–	13	.500
Arkansas-Pine Bluff	9	–	9	.500	12	–	17	.414
Alcorn State	9	–	9	.500	9	–	20	.310
Prairie View A&M	8	–	10	.444	13	–	17	.433
Mississippi Valley State	7	–	11	.389	10	–	19	.345
Jackson State	5	–	12	.294	11	–	16	.407
Alabama A&M	0	–	18	.000	2	–	25	.074
† 2017 SWAC tournament winner As of March 4, 2017; Rankings from AP poll

The 2017 SWAC women's basketball tournament did take place March 7–11, 2017. Tournament first round games were held on campus sites at the higher seed on March 7. The remaining rounds and the semifinals and championship at Toyota Center in Houston, Texas. Texas Southern won their first SWAC Women's Tournament and will receive the Southwestern Athletic Conference's automatic bid to the 2017 NCAA Women's Division I Basketball Championship.

== Seeds ==
2017 SWAC Women's Basketball Tournament seeds
Seed	School	Conference	Overall	Tiebreaker
1.	Grambling State	14-4		1-1 vs. Alabama State
2.	Texas Southern	14-4		0-2 vs. Alabama State
3.	Alabama State	12-6		
4.	Southern	11-7		
5.	Arkansas Pine Bluff	9-9		2-0 vs. TX Southern
6.	Alcorn State	9-9		0-2 vs. TX Southern
7.	Prairie View A&M	8-10		
8.	Mississippi Valley State	7-11		

== Bracket ==
Quarterfinals; Tuesday, March 7
3	Alabama State	47
6	Alcorn State	43
2	Texas Southern	65
7	Prairie View A&M	45
1	Grambling State	71
8	Mississippi Valley State	61
4	Southern	73
5	Arkansas Pine Bluff	66

Semifinals; Friday, March 10
3	Alabama State	54
2	Texas Southern	68
1	Grambling	65
4	Southern	56

Championship; Saturday, March 11; ESPN3
2	Texas Southern	70
1	Grambling	66

== See also ==
- 2017 SWAC men's basketball tournament
