= 2016–17 Western Illinois Leathernecks women's basketball team =

Intercollegiate basketball season

2016–17 Western Illinois Leathernecks women's basketball

NCAA Tournament, First Round
- Conference: Summit League
- Record: 26–7 (13–3 The Summit)
- Head coach: JD Gravina (6th season)
- Assistant coaches: Seth Minter; Sydney Crafton; Taylor Isnoto
- Home arena: Western Hall

2016–17 Summit League women's basketball standings
	Conf.				Overall
Team	W		L	PCT	W		L	PCT
Western Illinois †	13	–	3	.813	26	–	7	.788
IUPUI	12	–	4	.750	24	–	9	.727
South Dakota State	12	–	4	.750	23	–	9	.719
South Dakota	11	–	5	.688	23	–	9	.719
Omaha	8	–	8	.500	16	–	15	.516
Oral Roberts	7	–	9	.438	15	–	15	.500
North Dakota State	4	–	12	.250	6	–	24	.200
Denver	3	–	13	.188	6	–	24	.200
Fort Wayne	2	–	14	.125	5	–	24	.172
† 2017 Summit League Tournament winner As of March 19, 2017; Rankings from AP Poll

The 2016–17 Western Illinois Leathernecks women's basketball team represented Western Illinois University. The Leathernecks, were coached by JD Gravina and were members of The Summit League. They finished the season 26–7, 13–3 in Summit League play to finish in first place. They won The Summit League Women's Tournament, defeating IUPUI 77–69 in overtime. They were invited to the NCAA Women's Tournament for the first time since 1995, where they lost to Florida State in the first round.

== Roster ==
2016–17 Western Illinois Leathernecks women's basketball team
Players
Coaches

Pos.	#	Name	Height	Year	Previous school	Hometown
G	2	Emily Clemens	5 ft 4 in (1.63 m)	Jr	Muscatine High School	Muscatine, IA
F	3	Olivia Braun	6 ft 1 in (1.85 m)	Jr	St. Catherine's High School; Toledo	Racine, WI
G	10	Mallory Boyle	5 ft 11 in (1.8 m)	Sr	North Mahaska High School	New Sharon, IA
G	12	Morgan Blumer	5 ft 11 in (1.8 m)	Jr	Milton High School; Florida Gulf Coast	Milton, WI
G	13	Olivia Kaufmann	5 ft 8 in (1.73 m)	Fr	Jacksonville High School	Jacksonville, IL
G	14	Taylor Hanneman	5 ft 10 in (1.78 m)	Jr	Illini Bluffs High School; Mercer	Glasford, IL
G	20	Andi Pierce	5 ft 11 in (1.8 m)	Fr	Garber High School	Garber, OK
F	21	Jasmine Patrick	6 ft 0 in (1.83 m)	Sr	Westside; Grossmont College	Jacksonville, FL
G	22	Michelle Farrow	5 ft 10 in (1.78 m)	RS Jr	Waukesha West	Waukesha, WI
G	24	Taylor Higginbotham	5 ft 10 in (1.78 m)	So	Germantown	Germantown, WI
G	34	Samantha Pryor	6 ft 0 in (1.83 m)	Fr	Central High School	Elgin, IL

Head coach

- JD Gravina (William Jewell)

Assistant coach(es)

- Seth Minter (Culver–Stockton)
- Sydney Crafton (Missouri)
- Taylor Ignoto (Mineral Area College)

Legend

- (C) Team captain
- (S) Suspended
- (I) Ineligible
- (W) Walk-on
- Injured
- Current redshirt

Roster

== Schedule ==
Date time, TV	Rank^{#}	Opponent^{#}	Result	Record	Site (attendance) city, state
Non-conference regular season
November 11, 2016*; 7:00 pm, Fighting Leather All-Access		Monmouth College	W 113–29	1–0	Western Hall (702); Macomb, IL
November 13, 2016*; 4:00 pm, ESPN3		at Milwaukee	L 68–76	1–1	Klotsche Center (663); Milwaukee, WI
November 16, 2016*; 11:00 am, OVC Digital Network		at SE Missouri State	W 100–87	2–1	Show Me Center (2,553); Cape Girardeau, MO
November 19, 2016*; 4:30 pm, ESPN3		Northern Illinois	W 83–79	3–1	Western Hall (562); Macomb, IL
November 22, 2016*; 11:00 am, Roos TV		at UMKC	W 78–65	4–1	Swinney Recreation Center (186); Kansas City, MO
November 27, 2016*; 2:00 pm, OVC Digital Network		at SIU Edwardsville	W 76–74	5–1	Vadalabene Center (603); Edwardsville, IL
November 29, 2016*; 7:00 pm, SECN+		at Missouri	L 68–71	5–2	Mizzou Arena (1,843); Columbia, MO
December 2, 2016*; 7:00 pm		at Marquette	L 61–77	5–3	Al McGuire Center (1,222); Milwaukee, WI
December 5, 2016*; 7:00 pm, ESPN3		Bradley	W 91–77	6–3	Western Hall (676); Macomb, IL
December 7, 2016*; 7:00 pm, ESPN3		Graceland	W 118–40	7–3	Western Hall (407); Macomb, IL
December 10, 2016*; 4:30 pm, ESPN3		Eastern Illinois	W 83–62	8–3	Western Hall (604); Macomb, IL
December 17, 2016*; 2:00 pm		at Chicago State	W 54–50	9–3	Jones Concocation Center (116); Chicago, IL
December 20, 2016*; 7:00 pm, Fighting Leatherneck All-Access		Illinois State	W 80–50	10–3	Western Hall (573); Macomb, IL
Summit Conference
December 28, 2016; 6:00 pm, Mastodon All-Access		at Purdue–Fort Wayne	W 75–63	11–3 (1–0)	Hilliard Gates Sports Center (568); Fort Wayne, IN
December 31, 2016; 3:30 pm, ESPN3		at IUPUI	L 52–66	11–4 (1–1)	IUPUI Gymnasium (1,103); Indianapolis, IN
January 5, 2016; 7:00 pm, Fighting Leatherneck All-Access		Denver	W 87–62	12–4 (2–1)	Western Hall (494); Macomb, IL
January 7, 2017; 4:30 pm, Fightin Leatherneck All-Access		Oral Roberts	W 76–72	13–4 (3–1)	Western Hall (589); Macomb, IL
January 11, 2017; 7:00 pm, Mavs All-Access		at Omaha	W 78–74	14–4 (4–1)	Baxter Arena (256); Omaha, NE
January 14, 2017; 4:30 pm, Fighting Leathernecks All-Access		North Dakota State	W 110–81	15–4 (5–1)	Western Hall (604); Macomb, IL
January 21, 2017; 2:00 pm, ESPN3		at South Dakota State	L 58–73	15–5 (5–2)	Frost Arena (2,305); Brookings, SD
January 25, 2017; 7:00 pm, ESPN3		IUPUI	L 72–76	15–6 (5–3)	Western Hall (586); Macomb, IL
January 28, 2017; 1:00 pm, MIDCOSN/ESPN3		at South Dakota	W 86–78	16–6 (6–3)	Sanford Coyote Sports Center (2,018); Vermillion, SD
February 1, 2017; 7:00 pm, ORU Sports Network		at Oral Roberts	W 76–62	17–6 (7–3)	Mabee Center (411); Tulsa, OK
February 4, 2017; 4:30 pm, ESPN3		Omaha	W 80–63	18–6 (8–3)	Western Hall (1,041); Macomb, IL
February 8, 2017; 5:00 pm, MIDCOSN/ESPN3		at North Dakota State	W 87–60	19–6 (9–3)	Scheels Center (712); Fargo, ND
February 11, 2017; 2:00 pm, Pioneer Vision		at Denver	W 80–68	20–6 (10–3)	Magness Arena (375); Denver, CO
February 15, 2017; 7:00 pm, ESPN3		South Dakota State	W 83–77	21–6 (11–3)	Western Hall (1,303); Macomb, IL
February 22, 2017; 7:00 pm, ESPN3		Purdue–Fort Wayne	W 77–51	22–6 (12–3)	Western Hall (984); Macomb, IL
February 25, 2017; 4:30 pm, ESPN3		South Dakota	W 81–75	23–6 (13–3)	Western Hall (1,596); Macomb, IL
Summit League Women's Tournament
March 4, 2017; 12:00 pm, MidcoSN/ESPN3	(1)	vs. (8) Denver; Quarterfinals	W 82–39	24–6	Denny Sanford Premier Center (3,297); Sioux Falls, SD
March 6, 2017; 12:00 pm, MidcoSN/ESPN3	(1)	vs. (5) Omaha; Semifinals	W 84–82	25–6	Denny Sanford Premier Center; Sioux Falls, SD
March 7, 2017; 1:00 pm, ESPNU	(1)	vs. (2) IUPUI; Championship	W 77–69	26–6	Denny Sanford Premier Center (2,005); Sioux Falls, SD
NCAA Women's Tournament
March 17, 2017*; 7:30 pm, ESPN2	(14 S)	vs. (3 S) Florida State; First Round	L 66–87	26–7	Donald L. Tucker Civic Center; Tallahassee, FL
*Non-conference game. ^{#}Rankings from AP Poll. (#) Tournament seedings in parentheses. S=Stockton Region. All times are in Central Time.
