= 2017 Ohio Valley Conference women's basketball tournament =

- Classification: Division I
- Season: 2016–17
- Teams: 8
- Site: Nashville Municipal Auditorium; Nashville, Tennessee
- Champions: Belmont (2nd title)
- Winning coach: Cameron Newbauer (2nd title)
- MVP: Kylee Smith (Belmont)
- Television: OVCDN/ESPN3

2016–17 Ohio Valley Conference women's basketball standings
	Conf.				Overall
Team	W		L	PCT	W		L	PCT
Belmont	16	–	0	1.000	27	–	5	.844
Morehead State	11	–	5	.688	21	–	9	.700
SIU Edwardsville	9	–	7	.563	14	–	18	.438
Austin Peay	8	–	8	.500	14	–	16	.467
UT Martin	8	–	8	.500	12	–	20	.375
Murray State	7	–	9	.438	15	–	14	.517
Southeast Missouri State	7	–	9	.438	13	–	17	.433
Eastern Kentucky	7	–	9	.438	13	–	19	.406
Tennessee Tech	7	–	9	.438	10	–	20	.333
Jacksonville State	6	–	10	.375	13	–	15	.464
Tennessee State	5	–	11	.313	10	–	16	.385
Eastern Illinois	5	–	11	.313	9	–	19	.321
† 2017 OVC tournament winner As of March 4, 2017; Rankings from AP poll

The 2017 Ohio Valley Conference women's basketball tournament was held March 1–4 at Nashville Municipal Auditorium in Nashville, Tennessee.

== Format ==
The OVC women's tournament is a traditional single-elimination eight-team tournament, seeded with the #8 seed facing the #1 seed in the first round, #7 facing #2, and so on. There is no reseeding, so if the #8 team were to defeat the #1 seed it would continue in the tournament playing the team which would have faced the #1 seed in the subsequent round (winner of #4 vs. #5).

== Seeds ==
Seed	School	Conference	Overall	Tiebreaker
1	Belmont	16–0	24–5	
2	Morehead State	11–5	21–8	
3	SIU-Edwardsville	9–7	13–16	
4	Tenn-Martin	8–8	11–18	1–1 vs. Austin Peay, 1–0 vs. Tenn Tech
5	Austin Peay	8–8	14–15	1–1 vs. Tenn-Martin, 0–1 vs. Tenn Tech
6	Tennessee Tech	7–9	10–19	3–1 EKU, SEMO & Murray State
7	Eastern Kentucky	7–9	10–19	2–2 vs. Tenn Tech, SEMO, & Murray State, 1–0 vs. SEMO
8	Southeast Missouri State	7–9	13–16	2–2 vs. Tenn Tech, EKU, & Murray State, 0–1 vs. EKU

== Bracket ==
Quarterfinals; Wednesday, March 1 & Thursday, March 2 OVCDN/ESPN3
1	Belmont	74
8	Southeast Missouri State	59
4	Tenn Martin	59
5	Austin Peay	43
2	Morehead State	67
7	Eastern Kentucky	73
3	SIU Edwardsville	77
6	Tennessee Tech	69

Semifinals; Friday, March 3 OVDN/ESPN3
1	Belmont	83
4	Tenn Martin	62
3	SIU Edwardsville	58
7	Eastern Kentucky	61

Championship; Saturday, March 4 OVDN/ESPN3
1	Belmont	94
7	Eastern Kentucky	64

== See also ==
- 2017 Ohio Valley Conference men's basketball tournament
