= 2017 MEAC women's basketball tournament =

- Classification: Division I
- Season: 2016–17
- Teams: 13
- Site: Norfolk Scope; Norfolk, Virginia
- Champions: Hampton
- Television: ESPN3

2016–17 MEAC women's basketball standings
| | Conf. | | | | Overall |
| Team | W | | L | PCT | W | | L | PCT |
|---|---|---|---|---|---|---|---|---|
| Bethune-Cookman | 15 | – | 1 | .938 | 19 | – | 9 | .679 |
| Howard | 12 | – | 4 | .750 | 16 | – | 12 | .571 |
| Hampton | 11 | – | 5 | .688 | 17 | – | 12 | .586 |
| Norfolk State | 9 | – | 7 | .563 | 14 | – | 14 | .500 |
| Florida A&M | 9 | – | 7 | .563 | 11 | – | 18 | .379 |
| North Carolina A&T | 8 | – | 8 | .500 | 12 | – | 17 | .414 |
| Savannah State | 8 | – | 8 | .500 | 11 | – | 18 | .379 |
| Coppin State | 8 | – | 8 | .500 | 8 | – | 20 | .286 |
| Morgan State | 7 | – | 9 | .438 | 9 | – | 20 | .310 |
| North Carolina Central | 7 | – | 9 | .438 | 8 | – | 20 | .286 |
| Maryland-Eastern Shore | 6 | – | 10 | .375 | 12 | – | 15 | .444 |
| South Carolina State | 2 | – | 14 | .125 | 5 | – | 22 | .185 |
| Delaware State | 2 | – | 14 | .125 | 3 | – | 26 | .103 |
† 2017 MEAC tournament winner As of March 6, 2017; Rankings from AP poll

The 2017 Mid-Eastern Athletic Conference women's basketball tournament took place March 6–11, 2017, at the Norfolk Scope in Norfolk, Virginia. First round games were played March 6 and March 7, with the quarterfinal games played on March 8 and 9. The semifinals were held March 10, with the championship game on March 11.

== Seeds ==
The top 13 teams were eligible for the tournament.

Teams were seeded by record within the conference, with a tiebreaker system to seed teams with identical conference records.

| Seed | School | Conference | Tiebreaker |
|---|---|---|---|
| 1 | Bethune Cookman | 15–1 | |
| 2 | Howard | 12–4 | |
| 3 | Hampton | 11–5 | |
| 4 | Florida A&M | 9–7 | 1–0 vs Norfolk State |
| 5 | Norfolk State | 9–7 | 0–1 vs. Florida A&M |
| 6 | Coppin State | 8–8 | 2–0 vs. North Carolina A&T/Savannah State |
| 7 | North Carolina A&T | 8–8 | 1–1 vs. Coppin State/Savannah State |
| 8 | Savannah State | 8–8 | 0–2 vs. North Carolina A&T/Coppin State |
| 9 | Morgan State | 7–9 | 1–0 vs. NC Central |
| 10 | NC Central | 7–9 | 0–1 vs. Morgan State |
| 11 | Maryland-Eastern Shore | 6–10 | |
| 12 | Delaware State | 2–14 | 1–0 vs. SC State |
| 13 | South Carolina State | 2–14 | 0–1 vs. Delaware State |
† – MEAC regular season champions. Overall records are as of the end of the regular season.

== Schedule ==
| Session | Game | Time* | Matchup^{#} | Score | Television |
First round – Monday, March 6
| 1 | 1 | 11:00 am | #4 Florida A&M vs. #13 South Carolina State | 65–62 | ESPN3 |
| 1 | 2 | 1:00 pm | #5 Norfolk State vs. #12 Delaware State | 60–40 | ESPN3 |
| 1 | 3 | 3:00 pm | #6 Coppin State vs. #11 Maryland-Eastern Shore | 59–62 | ESPN3 |
First round – Tuesday, March 7
| 2 | 4 | 12:00 pm | #8 Savannah State vs. #9 Morgan State | 59–51 | ESPN3 |
| 2 | 5 | 2:00 pm | #7 North Carolina A&T vs. #10 NC Central | 71–53 | ESPN3 |
Quarterfinals – Wednesday, March 8
| 4 | 6 | 12:00 pm | #1 Bethune Cookman vs. #8 Savannah State | 53–43 | ESPN3 |
| 4 | 7 | 2:00 pm | #4 Florida A & M vs. #5 Norfolk State | 65–77 | ESPN3 |
Quarterfinals – Thursday, March 9
| 5 | 8 | 12:00 pm | #2 Howard 58 vs. #7 North Carolina A&T 68 | 58–68 | ESPN3 |
| 5 | 9 | 2:00 pm | #3 Hampton 66 vs. #11 Maryland Eastern Shore 56 | 66–56 | ESPN3 |
Semifinals – Friday, March 10
| 6 | 10 | 12:00 pm | #1 Bethune Cookman vs. #5 Norfolk State | 59–42 | ESPN3 |
| 6 | 11 | 2:00 pm | #7 North Carolina A&T vs. #3 Hampton | 62–64 | ESPN3 |
Championship – Saturday, March 11
| 7 | 12 | 4:00 pm | #1 Bethune Cookman vs. #3 Hampton | 49–52 | ESPN3 |
*Game times in EST. #-Rankings denote tournament seeding.

== Bracket ==
First round March 6 and 7
8 | Savannah State | 59
9 | Morgan State | 51
4 | Florida A&M | 65
13 | South Carolina State | 62
5 | Norfolk State | 60
12 | Delaware State | 40
7 | North Carolina A&T | 71
10 | North Carolina Central | 53
6 | Coppin State | 59
11 | Maryland-Eastern Shore | 62

Quarterfinals; March 8 and 9
1 | Bethune Cookman | 53
8 | Savannah State | 43
4 | Florida A&M | 65
5 | Norfolk State | 77
2 | Howard | 58
7 | North Carolina A&T | 68
3 | Hampton | 66
11 | Maryland Eastern Shore | 56

Semifinals; March 10
1 | Bethune Cookman | 59
5 | Norfolk State | 42
7 | North Carolina A&T | 62
3 | Hampton | 64

Championship; March 11; ESPN3
1 | Bethune Cookman | 49
3 | Hampton | 52
