= 2017 Summit League women's basketball tournament =

2017 women's basketball tournament

- Classification: Division I
- Season: 2016–17
- Teams: 8
- Site: Denny Sanford Premier Center; Sioux Falls, South Dakota
- Champions: Western Illinois (2nd title)
- Winning coach: JD Gravina (1st title)
- MVP: Emily Clemens (Western Illinois)
- Attendance: 21,092
- Television: Midco Sport Network; ESPNU

2016–17 Summit League women's basketball standings
	Conf.				Overall
Team	W		L	PCT	W		L	PCT
Western Illinois †	13	–	3	.813	26	–	7	.788
IUPUI	12	–	4	.750	24	–	9	.727
South Dakota State	12	–	4	.750	23	–	9	.719
South Dakota	11	–	5	.688	23	–	9	.719
Omaha	8	–	8	.500	16	–	15	.516
Oral Roberts	7	–	9	.438	15	–	15	.500
North Dakota State	4	–	12	.250	6	–	24	.200
Denver	3	–	13	.188	6	–	24	.200
Fort Wayne	2	–	14	.125	5	–	24	.172
† 2017 Summit League Tournament winner As of March 19, 2017; Rankings from AP Poll

The 2017 Summit League women's basketball tournament was a post-season women's basketball tournament for The Summit League. The tournament took place March 4–7 at the Denny Sanford Premier Center in Sioux Falls, South Dakota. The Top 8 teams in the final standings qualified for the tournament.

== Seeds ==
Seed	School	Conference	Overall	Tiebreaker #1	Tiebreaker #2
1	Western Illinois	13–3	23–6		
2	IUPUI	12–4	22–7	1–1 vs. South Dakota State	2–0 vs. Western Illinois
3	South Dakota State	12–4	21–7	1–1 vs. IUPUI	1–1 vs. Western Illinois
4	South Dakota	11–5	22–7		
5	Omaha	8–8	15–14		
6	Oral Roberts	7–9	15–14		
7	North Dakota State	4–12	6–23		
8	Denver	3–13	6–23		

== Schedule ==
Session	Game	Time*	Matchup^{#}	Television	Attendance
Quarterfinals – Saturday March 4, 2016
1	1	12:00 PM	#8 Denver vs #1 Western Illinois	Midco Sport Network	3,297
1	2	2:30 PM	#7 North Dakota State vs #2 IUPUI	Midco Sport Network	3,297
Quarterfinals – Sunday March 5, 2016
2	3	12:00 PM	#5 Omaha vs #4 South Dakota	Midco Sport Network	9,419
2	4	2:30 PM	#6 Oral Roberts vs #3 South Dakota State	Midco Sport Network	9,419
Semifinals – Monday March 6, 2016
3	5	12:00 PM	#1 Western Illinois vs #5 Omaha	Midco Sport Network	6,371
3	6	2:30 PM	#2 IUPUI vs #3 South Dakota State	Midco Sport Network	6,371
Championship – Tuesday March 8, 2016
7	9	1:00 PM	#1 Western Illinois vs. #2 IUPUI	ESPNU	2,005
*Game times in CT. #-Rankings denote tournament seed

== Bracket ==
Quarterfinals; Saturday/Sunday March 4–5; Midco Sport Network
1	Western Illinois	82
8	Denver	39
4	South Dakota	58
5	Omaha	64
2	IUPUI	69
7	North Dakota State	56
3	South Dakota State	65
6	Oral Roberts	50

Semifinals; Monday March 6 Midco Sport Network
1	Western Illinois	84
5	Omaha	82
2	IUPUI	65(OT)
3	South Dakota State	61

Championship game Tuesday March 7 ESPNU
1	Western Illinois	77(OT)
2	IUPUI	69

== See also ==
- 2017 Summit League men's basketball tournament
