= 2016–17 Southeastern Conference women's basketball season =

2016–17 SEC Women's Basketball Season
- League: NCAA Division I
- Sport: Basketball
- Teams: 14
- TV partner(s): ESPN2, SEC Network, FSN

WNBA Draft
- Top draft pick: Alaina Coates (South Carolina)
- Picked by: Chicago Sky

Regular season
- Season champions: South Carolina
- Runners-up: Mississippi State
- Season MVP: A'ja Wilson (South Carolina)

Tournament
- Venue: Bon Secours Wellness Arena, Greenville, South Carolina
- Champions: South Carolina
- Runners-up: Mississippi State
- Finals MVP: A'ja Wilson

Basketball seasons
- ← 2015–16 2017–18 →

2016–17 SEC women's basketball standings
	Conf.				Overall
Team	W		L	PCT	W		L	PCT
No. 3 South Carolina†	14	–	2	.875	33	–	4	.892
No. 7 Mississippi State	13	–	3	.813	34	–	5	.872
No. 18 Kentucky	11	–	5	.688	22	–	11	.667
No. 25 Missouri	11	–	5	.688	21	–	11	.656
Tennessee	10	–	6	.625	20	–	12	.625
Texas A&M	9	–	7	.563	22	–	12	.647
LSU	8	–	8	.500	20	–	12	.625
Auburn	7	–	9	.438	17	–	15	.531
Georgia	7	–	9	.438	16	–	15	.516
Ole Miss	6	–	10	.375	17	–	14	.548
Alabama	5	–	11	.313	22	–	14	.611
Florida	5	–	11	.313	15	–	16	.484
Vanderbilt	4	–	12	.250	14	–	16	.467
Arkansas	2	–	14	.125	13	–	17	.433
† 2017 SEC tournament winner Rankings from AP poll

The 2016–17 Southeastern Conference women's basketball season began with practices in October 2016, followed by the start of the 2016–17 NCAA Division I women's basketball season in November. Conference play started in early January 2017 and concluded in March with the 2017 SEC women's basketball tournament at the Bon Secours Wellness Arena in Greenville, South Carolina. The South Carolina Gamecocks were both regular season and tournament champions, with the Mississippi State Bulldogs as runner-up. Both teams received bids to the 2017 NCAA Division I women's basketball tournament and advanced to face each other in the championship, where South Carolina claimed their first-ever national title.

== Pre-season ==
	Media	Coaches
1.	South Carolina	
2.	Mississippi State	
3.	Tennessee	
4.	Kentucky	Florida
5.	Florida	Kentucky
6.	Texas A&M	Auburn
7.	Auburn	Missouri
8.	Missouri	Texas A&M
9.	Vanderbilt	
10.	Georgia	Arkansas
11.	Arkansas	LSU
12.	LSU	Georgia
13.	Alabama	
14.	Ole Miss	

=== Pre-season All-SEC teams ===
Media	Coaches
Makayla Epps Kentucky	Epps
Victoria Vivians Mississippi State	Vivians
Alaina Coates South Carolina	Coates
**A'ja Wilson South Carolina**	**Wilson**
Diamond DeShields Tennessee	DeShields
	Jessica Jackson Arkansas
	Ronni Williams Florida
	Sophie Cunningham Missouri

- Coaches select eight players
- Players in bold are choices for SEC Player of the Year

== Head coaches ==
Note: Stats shown are before the beginning of the season. Overall and SEC records are from time at current school.

Team	Head coach	Previous job	Seasons at school	Overall record	SEC record	NCAA Tournaments	NCAA Final Fours	NCAA Championships
Alabama	Kristy Curry	Texas Tech	4th	309–200	13–35	9	1	0
Arkansas	Jimmy Dykes	Seattle	3rd	30–32	13–19	1	0	0
Auburn	Terri Williams-Flournoy	Georgetown	5th	214–162	23–38	4	0	0
Florida	Amanda Butler	Charlotte	10th	215–143	66–74	4	0	0
Georgia	Joni Taylor	Georgia (ass't)	2nd	21–9	9–7	1	0	0
Kentucky	Matthew Mitchell	Memphis	10th	249–118	91–49	7	0	0
LSU	Nikki Fargas	UCLA	6th	164–93	40–38	6	0	0
Mississippi State	Vic Schaefer	Sam Houston State	5th	170–155	32–32	2	0	0
Missouri	Robin Pingeton	Illinois State	7th	436–246	27–35	3	0	0
Ole Miss	Matt Insell	Kentucky	4th	41–44	11–37	0	0	0
South Carolina	Dawn Staley	Temple	9th	360–156	83–43	11	1	0
Tennessee	Holly Warlick	Tennessee (ass't)	5th	108–34	50–14	4	0	0
Texas A&M	Gary Blair	Arkansas	14th	717–292	45–19	22	2	1
Vanderbilt	Stephanie White	Indiana	1st	0–0	0–0	0	0	0

== Weekly rankings ==
Legend: ██ Increase in ranking. ██ Decrease in ranking. ██ Not ranked the previous week. RV=Received votes. NR=No rank/vote.
		Pre	Wk 2	Wk 3	Wk 4	Wk 5	Wk 6	Wk 7	Wk 8	Wk 9	Wk 10	Wk 11	Wk 12	Wk 13	Wk 14	Wk 15	Wk 16	Wk 17	Wk 18	Final
Alabama	AP	NR	NR	NR	NR	NR	NR	NR	NR	NR	RV	NR	NR	NR	NR	NR				
Alabama	C	NR	NR	NR	NR	NR	NR	NR	NR	NR	NR	NR	NR	NR	NR	NR				
Arkansas	AP	NR	NR	NR	NR	NR	NR	NR	NR	NR	NR	NR	NR	NR	NR	NR				
Arkansas	C	NR	NR	NR	NR	NR	NR	NR	NR	NR	NR	NR	NR	NR	NR	NR				
Auburn	AP	RV	RV	RV	23	RV	RV	RV	NR	NR	NR	NR	NR	NR	NR	NR				
Auburn	C	RV	RV	RV	RV	NR	RV	NR	NR	NR	NR	NR	NR	NR	NR	NR				
Florida	AP	20	19	16	19	23	RV	RV	NR	NR	NR	NR	NR	NR	NR	NR				
Florida	C	24	23	20	23	25	RV	RV	NR	NR	NR	NR	NR	NR	NR	NR				
Georgia	AP	NR	NR	NR	NR	NR	NR	NR	NR	NR	NR	NR	NR	NR	NR	NR				
Georgia	C	RV	RV	NR	NR	NR	NR	NR	NR	NR	NR	NR	NR	NR	NR	NR				
Kentucky	AP	19	15	20	17	15	19	18	17	24	RV	RV	RV	25	RV	NR				
Kentucky	C	19	19	24	20	18	23	24	23	RV	NR	NR	NR	RV	NR	NR				
LSU	AP	NR	NR	NR	NR	NR	NR	NR	NR	NR	RV	RV	NR	NR	NR	NR				
LSU	C	NR	NR	NR	NR	NR	NR	NR	RV	NR	RV	NR	NR	NR	NR	NR				
Mississippi State	AP	10	10	7	6	5	5	5	5	4	4	4	4	5	4	3				
Mississippi State	C	11	9	7	6	5	5	5	5	4	4	4	5	4	4	3				
Missouri	AP	24	25	RV	RV	NR	NR	NR	NR	NR	NR	NR	NR	NR	RV	NR				
Missouri	C	RV	RV	RV	RV	NR	NR	NR	NR	NR	NR	NR	NR	NR	NR	NR				
Ole Miss	AP	NR	NR	NR	NR	NR	NR	RV	NR	RV	NR	NR	NR	NR	NR	NR				
Ole Miss	C	NR	NR	NR	NR	NR	NR	NR	NR	NR	NR	NR	NR	NR	NR	NR				
South Carolina	AP	4	4	3	3	6	6	6	6	5	5	5	5	4	6	6				
South Carolina	C	3	3	3	3	6	6	6	6	5	5	5	4	6	6	5				
Tennessee	AP	13	13	17	22	RV	NR	RV	RV	RV	RV	NR	RV	RV	24	RV				
Tennessee	C	14	13	16	25	RV	RV	RV	RV	RV	RV	RV	RV	25	25	RV				
Texas A&M	AP	RV	RV	RV	25	RV	RV	RV	RV	RV	RV	25	RV	RV	RV	23				
Texas A&M	C	23	24	25	19	RV	RV	RV	RV	RV	RV	RV	RV	RV	RV	24				
Vanderbilt	AP	NR	NR	NR	NR	RV	RV	RV	RV	NR	NR	NR	NR	NR	NR	NR				
Vanderbilt	C	NR	NR	NR	NR	NR	NR	NR	NR	NR	NR	NR	NR	NR	NR	NR				

Rankings source:

== Regular season ==
=== Conference matrix ===
This table summarizes the head-to-head results between teams in conference play.

	Alabama	Arkansas	Auburn	Florida	Georgia	Kentucky	LSU	Mississippi State	Missouri	Ole Miss	South Carolina	Tennessee	Texas A&M	Vanderbilt
vs. Alabama	–	1–0	1–0	0–0	1–0	1–0	1–0	1–0	0–1	0–2	1–0	0–1	1–0	1–0
vs. Arkansas	0–1	–	0–0	1–0	1–0	0–0	2–0	1–0	1–0	1–0	1–0	1–0	1–0	0–1
vs. Auburn	0–1	0–0	–	0–1	0–0	1–0	0–0	1–0	1–0	0–1	1–0	0–1	1–0	0–1
vs. Florida	0–1	0–1	1–0	–	0–1	0–0	1–0	1–0	0–0	1–0	1–0	1–0	2–0	0–1
vs. Georgia	0–0	0–1	0–1	1–0	–	1–0	0–0	0–0	1–0	1–0	2–0	0–1	0–1	0–1
vs. Kentucky	0–1	0–0	0–1	0–0	0–1	–	0–1	0–0	1–1	0–1	1–0	1–0	1–0	0–1
vs. LSU	0–1	0–2	0–0	0–1	0–0	1–0	–	1–0	0–1	0–0	1–0	1–0	1–1	1–0
vs. Mississippi State	0–1	0–1	0–1	0–1	0–0	0–0	0–1	–	0–1	0–0	1–0	0–1	0–2	0–1
vs. Missouri	1–0	0–2	0–1	0–0	0–1	1–1	1–0	1–0	–	0–0	0–1	1–0	0–1	0–1
vs. Ole Miss	2–0	0–1	1–0	0–1	0–1	1–0	0–0	1–0	0–0	–	1–0	0–1	0–0	1–0
vs. South Carolina	0–1	0–1	0–2	0–1	0–2	0–1	0–1	0–1	1–0	0–1	–	1–0	0–0	0–1
vs. Tennessee	0–0	0–0	1–0	0–1	1–0	0–1	0–1	1–0	0–0	1–0	0–1	–	1–0	0–2
vs. Texas A&M	0–1	0–1	0–1	0–2	1–0	0–1	1–1	2–0	1–0	0–0	0–0	0–1	–	0–1
vs. Vanderbilt	0–1	1–0	1–0	1–0	1–0	1–0	0–1	1–0	1–0	0–1	2–0	2–0	1–0	–
Total	5–9	2–12	5–9	4–10	6–8	10–4	7–7	13–1	9–5	5–9	12–2	8–6	9–5	3–11

== SEC tournament ==
The conference tournament was held March 1 through March 5, 2017, at the Bon Secours Wellness Arena in Greenville, South Carolina. Teams were seeded by conference record, with ties broken by record between the tied teams followed by record against the regular-season champion, if necessary.

**2017 SEC women's basketball tournament seeds and results**
Seed	School	Conf.	Over.	Tiebreaker	First round March 1	Second round March 2	Quarterfinals March 3	Semifinals March 4	Championship March 5
1.	‡**South Carolina**	14–2	27–4		Bye	Bye	vs. #8 Georgia; **W, 72–48**	vs. #4 Kentucky; **W, 89–77**	vs. #2 Mississippi St. **W, 59–49**
2.	†**Mississippi St.**	13–3	29–4		Bye	Bye	vs. #7 LSU; **W, 78–61**	vs. #6 TAMU; **W, 66–50**	vs. #1 South Carolina; **L, 49–59**
3.	†**Missouri**	11–5	21–10	1–1 vs. Kentucky; 1–0 vs. South Carolina	Bye	Bye	vs. #6 TAMU; **L, 48–62**		
4.	†**Kentucky**	11–5	21–10	1–1 vs. Missouri; 0–1 vs. South Carolina	Bye	Bye	vs. #12 Alabama; **W, 65–55**	vs. #1 South Carolina; **L, 77–89**	
5.	#**Tennessee**	10–6	19–11		Bye	vs. #12 Alabama; **L, 64–72**			
6.	#**Texas A&M**	9–7	21–11		Bye	vs. #11 Florida; **W, 67–48**	vs. #3 Missouri; **W, 62–48**	vs. #2 Mississippi St. **L, 50–66**	
7.	#**LSU**	8–8	20–11		Bye	vs. #10 Ole Miss; **W, 65–49**	vs. #2 Mississippi St. **L, 61–78**		
8.	#**Georgia**	7–9	16–16	1–0 vs. Auburn	Bye	vs. #9 Auburn; **W, 56–52**	vs. #1 South Carolina; **L, 48–72**		
9.	#**Auburn**	7–9	17–14	0–1 vs. Georgia	Bye	vs. #8 Georgia; **L, 52–56**			
10.	#**Ole Miss**	6–10	17–13		Bye	vs. #7 LSU; **L, 49–65**			
11.	**Florida**	5–11	16–15	1–0 vs. Alabama	vs. #14 Arkansas; **W, 71–61**	vs. #11 TAMU; **L, 48–67**			
12.	**Alabama**	5–11	19–13	0–1 vs. Florida	vs. #13 Vanderbilt; **W, 77–57**	vs. #5 Tennessee; **W, 74–62**	vs. #4 Kentucky; **L, 55–65**		
13.	**Vanderbilt**	4–12	14–16		vs. #12 Alabama; **L, 57–77**				
14.	**Arkansas**	2–14	13–17		vs. #11 Florida; **L, 61–71**				
‡ – SEC regular season champions, and tournament No. 1 seed. † – Received a double-Bye in the conference tournament. # – Received a single-Bye in the conference tournament. Overall records include all games played in the SEC tournament.

== Postseason ==
=== NCAA Division I Women's Basketball tournament ===
Seed	Bracket	School	First round	Second round	Sweet 16	Elite 8	Final Four	Championship
1	Stockton	South Carolina	#16 UNC Asheville, **W 90–40**	#8 Arizona State, **W 71–68**	#12 Quinnipiac, **W 100–58**	#3 Florida State, **W 71–64**	#2L Stanford, **W 62–53**	#2O Mississippi State, **W 67–55**
2	Oklahoma	Mississippi State	#15 Troy, **W 110–69**	#7 DePaul, **W 93–71**	#3 Washington, **W 75–64**	#1 Baylor, **W 94–85^{OT}**	#1B Connecticut, **W 66–64^{OT}**	#1S South Carolina, **L 55–67**
4	Lexington	Kentucky	#13 Belmont, **W 73–70**	#5 Ohio State, **L 68–82**				
5	Bridgeport	Texas A&M	#12 Penn, **W 63–61**	#4 UCLA, **L 43–75**				
5	Oklahoma	Tennessee	#12 Dayton, **W 66–57**	#4 Louisville, **L 64–75**				
6	Stockton	Missouri	#11 South Florida, **W 66–64**	#3 Florida State, **L 55–77**				
8	Oklahoma	LSU	#9 California, **L 52–55**					
11	Lexington	Auburn	#6 North Carolina State, **L 48–62**					
**# Bids: 8**	W-L (%):	TOTAL: 15–7 .682	6–2 .750	2–4 .333	2–0 1.000	2–0 1.000	2–0 1.000	1–1 .500

=== Women's National Invitation tournament ===
School	First round	Second round	Third round	Quarterfinals
Alabama	Mercer, **W 81–57**	Little Rock, **W 55–53**	Tulane, **W 72–64**	Georgia Tech, **L 66–76**
Ole Miss	Grambling State, **L 75–78**			
**W-L (%)**	1–1 .500	1–0 1.000	1–0 1.000	0–1 .000

== WNBA draft ==
The 2017 WNBA draft was held on April 13 in New York City. Eight women from the SEC were selected. This is the most draft picks for the SEC since 2008 (10), and the seventh time at least eight players from the league have been drafted. It is the sixth time that the SEC has had at least four first round picks.

=== SEC draftees ===
Pick	Player	WNBA Team	School
2	Alaina Coates	Chicago Sky (Note: The Mystics traded this pick to Chicago.)	South Carolina
3	Evelyn Akhator	Dallas Wings	Kentucky
4	Allisha Gray	Dallas Wings (Note: The Wings received this pick and the 23rd pick from the Los Angeles Sparks in exchange for another player and the 11th pick.)	South Carolina
10	Kaela Davis	Dallas Wings (Note: The Wings received this pick from the New York Liberty in an exchange.)	South Carolina
19	Jordan Reynolds	Atlanta Dream	Tennessee
22	Ronni Williams	Indiana Fever (Note: The Dream traded this pick to Indiana.)	Florida
25	Schaquilla Nunn	San Antonio Stars	Tennessee
33	Makayla Epps	Chicago Sky	Kentucky

Footnotes
