= 2016–17 Vanderbilt Commodores women's basketball team =

Intercollegiate basketball season

2016–17 Vanderbilt Commodores women's basketball

Air Force Classic Champions
- Conference: Southeastern Conference
- Record: 14–16 (4–12 SEC)
- Head coach: Stephanie White (1st season)
- Assistant coaches: Carolyn Peck; Joy Cheek; Kelly Komara
- Home arena: Memorial Gymnasium

2016–17 SEC women's basketball standings
	Conf.				Overall
Team	W		L	PCT	W		L	PCT
No. 3 South Carolina†	14	–	2	.875	33	–	4	.892
No. 7 Mississippi State	13	–	3	.813	34	–	5	.872
No. 18 Kentucky	11	–	5	.688	22	–	11	.667
No. 25 Missouri	11	–	5	.688	21	–	11	.656
Tennessee	10	–	6	.625	20	–	12	.625
Texas A&M	9	–	7	.563	22	–	12	.647
LSU	8	–	8	.500	20	–	12	.625
Auburn	7	–	9	.438	17	–	15	.531
Georgia	7	–	9	.438	16	–	15	.516
Ole Miss	6	–	10	.375	17	–	14	.548
Alabama	5	–	11	.313	22	–	14	.611
Florida	5	–	11	.313	15	–	16	.484
Vanderbilt	4	–	12	.250	14	–	16	.467
Arkansas	2	–	14	.125	13	–	17	.433
† 2017 SEC tournament winner Rankings from AP poll

The 2016–17 Vanderbilt Commodores women's basketball team represented Vanderbilt University in the 2016–17 NCAA Division I women's basketball season. The Commodores, led by first-year head coach Stephanie White, played their home games at Memorial Gymnasium and were members of the Southeastern Conference. They finished the season 14–16, 4–12 in SEC play to finish in thirteenth place. They lost in the first round of the SEC women's tournament to Alabama.

== Roster ==
2016–17 Vanderbilt Commodores women's basketball team
Players
Coaches

Pos.	#	Name	Height	Year	Previous school	Hometown
F	0	Kayla Overbeck	6 ft 1 in (1.85 m)	Fr	Newbury Park	Newbury Park, CA
G	1	Rebekah Dahlman	5 ft 9 in (1.75 m)	RS Jr	Braham Area	Braham, MN
G	3	Rachel Bell	5 ft 10 in (1.78 m)	Jr	Creek Wood	Cumberland Furnace, TN
G	10	Cierra Walker	5 ft 8 in (1.73 m)	Fr	Oregon City	Oregon City, OR
G	12	Myka Dancy	5 ft 9 in (1.75 m)	Jr	Antioch	Antioch, TN
G/F	21	Erin Whalen	6 ft 1 in (1.85 m)	Fr	Providence Day School	Charlotte, NC
F	22	Marqu'es Webb	6 ft 1 in (1.85 m)	Sr	Hoover	Hoover, AL
G	23	Minta Spears	5 ft 10 in (1.78 m)	RS Sr	Bullard; Texas Tech	Bullard, TX
F/C	31	Blessing Ejiofor	6 ft 5 in (1.96 m)	Fr	Eastside	Paterson, NJ
G	33	Christa Reed	5 ft 11 in (1.8 m)	So	Bay	Bay St. Louis, MS
G	35	Kaleigh Clemons-Green	5 ft 7 in (1.7 m)	Fr	Baylor School	Chattanooga, TN
G	41	Miaya Seawright	5 ft 7 in (1.7 m)	Jr	Hillcrest HS	Simpsonville, SC

Head coach

- Stephanie White (Purdue)

Assistant coach(es)

- Carolyn Peck (Vanderbilt)
- Joy Cheek (Duke)
- Kelly Komara (Purdue)

Legend

- (C) Team captain
- (S) Suspended
- (I) Ineligible
- (W) Walk-on
- Injured
- Current redshirt

Roster

== Schedule ==
Date time, TV	Rank^{#}	Opponent^{#}	Result	Record	Site (attendance) city, state
Exhibition
10/30/2016*; 2:00 pm		Bellarmine	W 97–63		Memorial Gymnasium (2,228); Nashville, TN
11/06/2016*; 2:00 pm		Union (KY)	W 93–43		Memorial Gymnasium (2,281); Nashville, TN
Non-conference regular season
11/11/2016*; 7:00 pm		Kennesaw State	W 86–54	1–0	Memorial Gymnasium (2,395); Nashville, TN
11/13/2016*; 1:00 pm		at No. 23 Indiana	L 61–94	1–1	Simon Skjodt Assembly Hall (3,029); Bloomington, IN
11/16/2016*; 7:00 pm		Drexel	W 73–63	2–1	Memorial Gymnasium (2,243); Nashville, TN
11/20/2016*; 2:00 pm		Duke	W 77–63	3–1	Memorial Gymnasium (2,841); Nashville, TN
11/22/2016*; 11:30 am		Robert Morris	W 75–59	4–1	Memorial Gymnasium (4,242); Nashville, TN
11/27/2016*; 2:00 pm		at UT Martin	W 79–77	5–1	Skyhawk Arena (2,137); Martin, TN
12/02/2016*; 6:00 pm		at Air Force; Air Force Classic semifinals	W 75–49	6–1	Clune Arena (312); Colorado Springs, CO
12/03/2016*; 5:30 pm		vs. SIU Edwardsville; Air Force Classic championship	W 73–63	7–1	Clune Arena; Colorado Springs, CO
12/05/2016*; 7:00 pm		Tulane	W 74–63	8–1	Memorial Gymnasium (2,297); Nashville, TN
12/08/2016*; 6:00 pm		at East Tennessee State	W 80–72	9–1	Freedom Hall Civic Center (1,014); Johnson City, TN
12/18/2016*; 2:00 pm		Tennessee Tech	W 89–57	10–1	Memorial Gymnasium (2,451); Nashville, TN
12/21/2016*; 7:00 pm		No. 8 Louisville	L 66–78	10–2	Memorial Gymnasium (2,779); Nashville, TN
12/28/2016*; 4:00 pm, ESPNU		at Memphis	L 59–75	10–3	Elma Roane Fieldhouse (1,034); Memphis, TN
SEC regular season
01/02/2016; 6:00 pm, SECN		at Texas A&M	L 72–77	10–4 (0–1)	Reed Arena (4,033); College Station, TX
01/05/2016; 8:00 pm, SECN		Tennessee; Rivalry	L 57–70	10–5 (0–2)	Memorial Gymnasium (3,509); Nashville, TN
01/08/2016; 11:00 am, SECN		at Georgia	L 68–70	10–6 (0–3)	Stegeman Coliseum (2,958); Athens, GA
01/12/2016; 7:00 pm		Auburn	L 59–64	10–7 (0–4)	Memorial Gymnasium (2,335); Nashville, TN
01/15/2016; 2:00 pm		Missouri	L 68–74	10–8 (0–5)	Memorial Gymnasium (2,504); Nashville, TN
01/19/2016; 7:00 pm		at Arkansas	L 56–59	10–9 (0–6)	Bud Walton Arena (1,302); Fayetteville, AR
01/22/2016; 4:00 pm, ESPN2		at Tennessee; Rivalry	L 63–91	10–10 (0–7)	Thompson–Boling Arena (10,106); Knoxville, TN
01/26/2016; 8:00 pm, SECN		Alabama	W 87–80	11–10 (1–7)	Memorial Gymnasium (2,316); Nashville, TN
01/29/2016; 2:00 pm		Florida	L 73–93	11–11 (1–8)	Memorial Gymnasium (4,336); Nashville, TN
02/05/2016; 11:00 am, SECN		at No. 25 Kentucky	L 63–71	11–12 (1–9)	Memorial Coliseum (6,023); Lexington, KY
02/09/2016; 8:00 pm, SECN		at No. 5 Mississippi State	L 41–86	11–13 (1–10)	Humphrey Coliseum (5,052); Starkville, MS
02/13/2016; 6:00 pm, SECN		LSU	W 70–68	12–13 (2–10)	Memorial Gymnasium (2,324); Nashville, TN
02/16/2016; 6:00 pm, SECN		at No. 6 South Carolina	L 51–82	12–14 (2–11)	Colonial Life Arena (13,089); Columbia, SC
02/19/2016; 2:00 pm		Ole Miss	W 85–67	13–14 (3–11)	Memorial Gymnasium (3,663); Nashville, TN
02/23/2016; 7:00 pm		Arkansas	W 66–64	14–14 (4–11)	Memorial Gymnasium (2,450); Nashville, TN
02/26/2016; 12:00 pm, SECN		at LSU	L 58–64	14–15 (4–12)	Maravich Center (2,005); Baton Rouge, LA
SEC Women's Tournament
03/01/2017; 10:00 am, SECN	(13)	vs. (12) Alabama; First Round	L 57–77	14–16	Bon Secours Wellness Arena (3,507); Greenville, SC
*Non-conference game. ^{#}Rankings from AP Poll. (#) Tournament seedings in parentheses. All times are in Central Time.

== Rankings ==
Regular season polls
Poll	Pre- season	Week 2	Week 3	Week 4	Week 5	Week 6	Week 7	Week 8	Week 9	Week 10	Week 11	Week 12	Week 13	Week 14	Week 15	Week 16	Week 17	Week 18	Week 19	Final
AP	NR	NR	NR	NR	RV	RV	RV	RV	NR	NR	NR	NR	NR	NR	NR	NR	NR			N/A
Coaches	NR	NR	NR	NR	NR	NR	NR	NR	NR	NR	NR	NR	NR	NR	NR	NR	NR			

Legend
	Increase in ranking
	Decrease in ranking
	Not ranked previous week
(RV)	Received votes

== See also ==
- 2016–17 Vanderbilt Commodores men's basketball team
