= 2016–17 Kentucky Wildcats women's basketball team =

Intercollegiate basketball season

2016–17 Kentucky Wildcats women's basketball

Kentucky Classic champions

NCAA tournament, second round
- Conference: Southeastern Conference

Ranking
- Coaches: No. 25
- AP: No. 18
- Record: 22–11 (11–5 SEC)
- Head coach: Matthew Mitchell (10th season)
- Assistant coaches: Kyra Elzy; Niya Butts; Lin Dunn
- Home arena: Memorial Coliseum; Rupp Arena

2016–17 SEC women's basketball standings
	Conf.				Overall
Team	W		L	PCT	W		L	PCT
No. 3 South Carolina†	14	–	2	.875	33	–	4	.892
No. 7 Mississippi State	13	–	3	.813	34	–	5	.872
No. 18 Kentucky	11	–	5	.688	22	–	11	.667
No. 25 Missouri	11	–	5	.688	21	–	11	.656
Tennessee	10	–	6	.625	20	–	12	.625
Texas A&M	9	–	7	.563	22	–	12	.647
LSU	8	–	8	.500	20	–	12	.625
Auburn	7	–	9	.438	17	–	15	.531
Georgia	7	–	9	.438	16	–	15	.516
Ole Miss	6	–	10	.375	17	–	14	.548
Alabama	5	–	11	.313	22	–	14	.611
Florida	5	–	11	.313	15	–	16	.484
Vanderbilt	4	–	12	.250	14	–	16	.467
Arkansas	2	–	14	.125	13	–	17	.433
† 2017 SEC tournament winner Rankings from AP poll

The 2016–17 Kentucky Wildcats women's basketball team represented University of Kentucky during the 2016–17 NCAA Division I women's basketball season. The Wildcats, led by tenth-year head coach Matthew Mitchell, played their home games at the Memorial Coliseum, with one game at Rupp Arena and were members of the Southeastern Conference. They finished the season 22–11, 11–5 in SEC play to finish in a tie for third place. They advanced to the semifinals of the SEC women's tournament, where they lost to South Carolina. They received an at-large bid to the NCAA women's tournament, where they defeated Belmont in the first round before losing to Ohio State in the second round.

== Roster ==
2016–17 Kentucky Wildcats women's basketball team
Players
Coaches

Pos.	#	Name	Height	Year	Previous school	Hometown
F	0	LaShae Halsel	6 ft 0 in (1.83 m)	So	Warren Central	Bowling Green, KY
G	4	Maci Morris	6 ft 0 in (1.83 m)	So	Bell County	Pineville, KY
G	11	Rachael Potter	5 ft 11 in (1.8 m)	Jr	Pikeville	Pikeville, KY
F	13	Evelyn Akhator	6 ft 2 in (1.88 m)	Sr	Chipola College	Lagos, Nigeria
G	15	Jessica Hardin	5 ft 8 in (1.73 m)	Sr	Wayne County; Bellarmine	Monticello, KY
G	20	Paige Poffenberger	5 ft 8 in (1.73 m)	Fr	Morgantown	Morgantown, WV
F	21	Ogechi Anyagaligbo (redshirt)	6 ft 0 in (1.83 m)	So	Miami County Day; Stony Brook	Miami, FL
G	22	Makenzie Cann	6 ft 0 in (1.83 m)	RS So	Cincinnati	Lawrenceburg, KY
G	24	Taylor Murray	5 ft 6 in (1.68 m)	So	Annapolis Area Christian	Odenton, MD
G	25	Makayla Epps	5 ft 10 in (1.78 m)	Sr	Marion County	Lebanon, KY
G	32	Jaida Roper	5 ft 7 in (1.7 m)	Fr	Houston	Memphis, TN
C	45	Alyssa Rice	6 ft 3 in (1.91 m)	Jr	Reynoldsburg	Reynoldsburg, OH

Head coach

- Matthew Mitchell (Mississippi State)

Assistant coach(es)

- Kyra Elzy (Tennessee)
- Niya Butts (Tennessee)
- Lin Dunn (UT Martin)

Legend

- (C) Team captain
- (S) Suspended
- (I) Ineligible
- (W) Walk-on
- Injured
- Current redshirt

Roster

== Schedule ==
Date time, TV	Rank^{#}	Opponent^{#}	Result	Record	Site (attendance) city, state
Exhibition
11/03/2016*; 7:00 pm	No. 19	Union (TN)	W 78–60		Memorial Coliseum (1,339); Lexington, KY
Non-conference regular season
11/11/2016*; 7:00 pm	No. 19	No. 14 Miami (FL); Kentucky Classic	W 82–66	1–0	Memorial Coliseum (4,471); Lexington, KY
11/12/2016*; 7:00 pm	No. 19	Albany; Kentucky Classic	W 70–46	2–0	Memorial Coliseum (4,667); Lexington, KY
11/17/2016*; 11:00 am	No. 15	New Hampshire	W 92–43	3–0	Memorial Coliseum (4,793); Lexington, KY
11/19/2016*; 9:00 pm	No. 15	at Colorado	L 69–79	3–1	Coors Events Center (1,507); Boulder, CO
11/23/2016*; 7:00 pm	No. 20	Morehead State	W 74–47	4–1	Memorial Coliseum (4,706); Lexington, KY
11/27/2016*; 2:00 pm	No. 20	Samford	W 80–57	5–1	Memorial Coliseum (4,569); Lexington, KY
12/01/2016*; 7:00 pm, SECN	No. 17	No. 12 Oklahoma; Big 12/SEC Women's Challenge	W 82–68	6–1	Memorial Coliseum (4,400); Lexington, KY
12/04/2016*; 2:00 pm	No. 17	at No. 7 Louisville; The Battle for the Bluegrass	L 67–69 ^{OT}	6–2	KFC Yum! Center (12,245); Louisville, KY
12/09/2016*; 7:00 pm	No. 15	Middle Tennessee	W 61–48	7–2	Memorial Coliseum (4,625); Lexington, KY
12/11/2016*; 1:00 pm, SECN	No. 15	Arizona State	L 71–73 ^{OT}	7–3	Rupp Arena (13,225); Lexington, KY
12/18/2016*; 2:00 pm	No. 19	Radford	W 59–36	8–3	Memorial Coliseum (4,547); Lexington, KY
12/21/2016*; 12:00 pm	No. 18	Washington State	W 69–67	9–3	Memorial Coliseum (4,875); Lexington, KY
12/29/2016*; 7:00 pm, ACCN Extra	No. 17	at No. 15 Duke	L 54–69	9–4	Cameron Indoor Stadium (4,121); Durham, NC
SEC regular season
01/01/2017; 4:00 pm, ESPN2	No. 17	at Tennessee; Rivalry	L 65–72	9–5 (0–1)	Thompson–Boling Arena (9,709); Knoxville, TN
01/05/2017; 7:00 pm, SECN	No. 24	Missouri	W 64–62	10–5 (1–1)	Memorial Coliseum (4,280); Lexington, KY
01/08/2017; 2:00 pm, SECN	No. 24	Texas A&M	L 68–77	10–6 (1–2)	Memorial Coliseum (5,669); Lexington, KY
01/12/2017; 8:00 pm		at Alabama	W 71–54	11–6 (2–2)	Coleman Coliseum (2,437); Tuscaloosa, AL
01/15/2017; 3:00 pm, SECN		Georgia	W 82–61	12–6 (3–2)	Memorial Coliseum (5,608); Lexington, KY
01/19/2017; 8:00 pm		at LSU	W 55–42	13–6 (4–2)	Maravich Center (1,845); Baton Rouge, LA
01/22/2017; 3:00 pm, SECN		at Auburn	W 64–60	14–6 (5–2)	Auburn Arena (2,294); Auburn, AL
01/26/2017; 7:00 pm		Ole Miss	W 89–57	15–6 (6–2)	Memorial Coliseum (4,272); Lexington, KY
01/30/2017; 7:00 pm, SECN	No. 25	at Missouri	L 67–73	15–7 (6–3)	Mizzou Arena (3,374); Columbia, MO
02/02/2017; 7:00 pm, SECN	No. 25	No. 4 South Carolina	L 63–75	15–8 (6–4)	Memorial Coliseum (5,533); Lexington, KY
02/05/2017; 12:00 pm, SECN	No. 25	Vanderbilt	W 71–63	16–8 (7–4)	Memorial Coliseum (6,023); Lexington, KY
02/09/2017; 7:00 pm		at Georgia	W 66–56	17–8 (8–4)	Stegeman Coliseum (3,235); Athens, GA
02/16/2017; 8:00 pm, SECN		at Arkansas	W 69–62	18–8 (9–4)	Bud Walton Arena (1,142); Fayetteville, AR
02/19/2017; 1:00 pm, SECN		Florida	W 67–48	19–8 (10–4)	Memorial Coliseum (6,604); Lexington, KY
02/23/2017; 7:00 pm		No. 3 Mississippi State	W 78–75 ^{OT}	20–8 (11–4)	Memorial Coliseum (5,244); Lexington, KY
02/26/2017; 2:00 pm, ESPNU	No. 22	at No. 7 South Carolina	L 87–95	20–9 (11–5)	Colonial Life Arena (18,000); Columbia, SC
SEC Women's Tournament
03/03/2017; 2:30 pm, SECN	(4) No. 20	vs. (12) Alabama; Quarterfinals	W 65–55	21–9	Bon Secours Wellness Arena (5,702); Greenville, SC
03/04/2017; 5:00 pm, ESPNU	(4) No. 20	vs. (1) No. 1 South Carolina; Semifinals	L 77–89	21–10	Bon Secours Wellness Arena (7,554); Greenville, SC
NCAA Women's Tournament
03/17/2017*; 12:00 pm, ESPN2	(4 L) No. 18	(13 L) Belmont; First Round	W 73–70	22–10	Memorial Coliseum (3,497); Lexington, KY
03/19/2017*; 12:00 pm, ESPN2	(4 L) No. 18	(5 L) No. 11 Ohio State; Second Round	L 68–82	22–11	Memorial Coliseum (2,644); Lexington, KY
*Non-conference game. ^{#}Rankings from AP Poll. (#) Tournament seedings in parentheses. L=Lexington Region. All times are in Eastern Time.

== Rankings ==
Regular season polls
Poll	Pre- season	Week 2	Week 3	Week 4	Week 5	Week 6	Week 7	Week 8	Week 9	Week 10	Week 11	Week 12	Week 13	Week 14	Week 15	Week 16	Week 17	Week 18	Week 19	Final
AP	19	15	20	17	15	19	18	17	24	RV	RV	RV	25	RV	RV	22	20	19	18	N/A
Coaches	19	19	24	20	18	23	24	23	RV	NR	NR	NR	RV	NR	NR	RV	24	24	24	25

Legend
	Increase in ranking
	Decrease in ranking
	Not ranked previous week
(RV)	Received votes

== See also ==
- 2016–17 Kentucky Wildcats men's basketball team
