= 2016–17 Alabama Crimson Tide women's basketball team =

Intercollegiate basketball season

2016–17 Alabama Crimson Tide women's basketball

WNIT, Quarterfinals
- Conference: Southeastern Conference
- Record: 22–14 (5–11 SEC)
- Head coach: Kristy Curry (4th season)
- Assistant coaches: Kelly Curry; Brooks Donald-Williams; Shereka Wright
- Home arena: Coleman Coliseum

2016–17 SEC women's basketball standings
	Conf.				Overall
Team	W		L	PCT	W		L	PCT
No. 3 South Carolina†	14	–	2	.875	33	–	4	.892
No. 7 Mississippi State	13	–	3	.813	34	–	5	.872
No. 18 Kentucky	11	–	5	.688	22	–	11	.667
No. 25 Missouri	11	–	5	.688	21	–	11	.656
Tennessee	10	–	6	.625	20	–	12	.625
Texas A&M	9	–	7	.563	22	–	12	.647
LSU	8	–	8	.500	20	–	12	.625
Auburn	7	–	9	.438	17	–	15	.531
Georgia	7	–	9	.438	16	–	15	.516
Ole Miss	6	–	10	.375	17	–	14	.548
Alabama	5	–	11	.313	22	–	14	.611
Florida	5	–	11	.313	15	–	16	.484
Vanderbilt	4	–	12	.250	14	–	16	.467
Arkansas	2	–	14	.125	13	–	17	.433
† 2017 SEC tournament winner Rankings from AP poll

The 2016–17 Alabama Crimson Tide women's basketball team represented the University of Alabama in the 2016–17 NCAA Division I women's basketball season. The Crimson Tide, led by fourth year head coach Kristy Curry, played their games at Coleman Coliseum and were members of the Southeastern Conference. They finished the season 22–14, 5–11 in SEC play to finish in a tie for eleventh place. They advanced to the quarterfinals of SEC women's tournament, where they lost to Kentucky. They were invited to the Women's National Invitation Tournament, where they defeated Mercer, Little Rock and Tulane in the first, second and third rounds before losing to Georgia Tech in the quarterfinals.

== Roster ==
2016–17 Alabama Crimson Tide women's basketball team
Players
Coaches

Pos.	#	Name	Height	Year	Previous school	Hometown
G	0	LaKyesha Stennis	5 ft 9 in (1.75 m)	Jr	Bryan Station HS; SW Tennessee CC	Lexington, KY
F	1	Quanetria Bolton	6 ft 0 in (1.83 m)	Jr	Anniston HS	Anniston, AL
G	3	Jordan Lewis	5 ft 7 in (1.7 m)	Fr	Lake Highland Prep	Orlando, FL
G	10	DaiJia Ruffin (I) (redshirt)	5 ft 9 in (1.75 m)	Jr	Sacred Heart Academy; Tennessee–Martin	Lexington, KY
G	11	Hannah Cook	6 ft 0 in (1.83 m)	Jr	Ozark HS	Ozark, MO
G	13	Coco Knight	5 ft 7 in (1.7 m)	Jr	Baldwin County HS; Shelton State CC	Bay Minette, AL
G	15	Meoshonti Knight	5 ft 8 in (1.73 m)	Jr	Central Catholic HS	Morgan City, LA
F	20	Ashley Williams	6 ft 0 in (1.83 m)	RS Jr	Alcovy HS	Covington, GA
G	21	Taylor Berry	5 ft 9 in (1.75 m)	So	Mount Carmel Academy	New Orleans, LA
G	23	Shquera Wade	6 ft 0 in (1.83 m)	So	Huntsville HS	Huntsville, AL
F	25	Ashley Knight	6 ft 5 in (1.96 m)	Fr	Lyndon B. Johnson HS	Austin, TX

Head coach

- Kristy Curry (Louisiana–Monroe)

Assistant coach(es)

- Kelly Curry (Texas A&M)
- Brooks Donald-Williams (Mississippi State)
- Shereka Wright (Purdue)

Legend

- (C) Team captain
- (S) Suspended
- (I) Ineligible
- (W) Walk-on
- Injured
- Current redshirt

Roster

== Schedule ==
Date time, TV	Rank^{#}	Opponent^{#}	Result	Record	Site (attendance) city, state
Exhibition
11/04/2016*; 7:00 pm		West Alabama	W 86–34	–	Coleman Coliseum (922); Tuscaloosa, AL
Non-conference regular season
11/11/2016*; 5:00 pm		New Orleans	W 78–57	1–0	Coleman Coliseum (7,042); Tuscaloosa, AL
11/14/2016*; 7:00 pm		Mississippi Valley State	W 93–44	2–0	Coleman Coliseum (1,016); Tuscaloosa, AL
11/17/2016*; 7:00 pm		Lipscomb	W 82–35	3–0	Coleman Coliseum (1,082); Tuscaloosa, AL
11/22/2016*; 7:00 pm		Georgia Southern	W 66–48	4–0	Coleman Coliseum (933); Tuscaloosa, AL
11/27/2016*; 2:00 pm		Alabama A&M	W 97–29	5–0	Coleman Coliseum (2,054); Tuscaloosa, AL
12/01/2016*; 7:00 pm		Alcorn State	W 93–43	6–0	Coleman Coliseum (1,967); Tuscaloosa, AL
12/04/2016*; 11:00 am, SECN		Kansas; Big 12/SEC Women's Challenge	W 71–65 ^{OT}	7–0	Coleman Coliseum (1,176); Tuscaloosa, AL
12/11/2016*; 1:00 pm		at Georgetown	L 59–70	7–1	McDonough Gymnasium (819); Washington, D.C.
12/15/2016*; 11:30 am		Georgia State	W 80–57	8–1	Coleman Coliseum (4,203); Tuscaloosa, AL
12/17/2016*; 2:00 pm		Georgia Tech	W 67–65	9–1	Coleman Coliseum (2,214); Tuscaloosa, AL
12/19/2016*; 7:00 pm		vs. McNeese State; Patrick Harrington Tournament	W 84–63	10–1	The Arena at NWFSC (498); Niceville, FL
12/20/2016*; 7:00 pm		vs. UTEP; Patrick Harrington Tournament	W 78–60	11–1	The Arena at NWFSC (502); Niceville, FL
12/28/2016*; 7:00 pm		Florida A&M	W 81–46	12–1	Coleman Coliseum (2,213); Tuscaloosa, AL
SEC regular season
01/01/2017; 1:00 pm, ESPN2		at No. 6 South Carolina	L 45–93	12–2 (0–1)	Colonial Life Arena (12,069); Columbia, SC
01/05/2017; 7:00 pm		Ole Miss	W 90–80	13–2 (1–1)	Coleman Coliseum (2,588); Tuscaloosa, AL
01/08/2017; 2:00 pm		at Missouri	W 59–58	14–2 (2–1)	Mizzou Arena (4,287); Columbia, MO
01/12/2017; 7:00 pm		Kentucky	L 54–71	14–3 (2–2)	Coleman Coliseum (2,437); Tuscaloosa, AL
01/15/2017; 4:00 pm, SECN		Arkansas	L 50–68	14–4 (2–3)	Coleman Coliseum (2,667); Tuscaloosa, AL
01/19/2017; 7:00 pm		No. 4 Mississippi State	L 54–67	14–5 (2–4)	Coleman Coliseum (2,605); Tuscaloosa, AL
01/22/2017; 2:00 pm		at Ole Miss	W 65–57	15–5 (3–4)	The Pavilion at Ole Miss (1,596); Oxford, MS
01/26/2017; 8:00 pm, SECN		at Vanderbilt	L 80–87	15–6 (3–5)	Memorial Gymnasium (2,316); Nashville, TN
01/29/2017; 5:00 pm, SECN		Auburn	L 55–66	15–7 (3–6)	Coleman Coliseum (3,453); Tuscaloosa, AL
02/05/2017; 3:00 pm, SECN		at LSU	L 41–48	15–8 (3–7)	Maravich Center (2,383); Baton Rouge, LA
02/09/2017; 7:00 pm		at Texas A&M	L 48–69	15–9 (3–8)	Reed Arena (4,062); College Station, TX
02/12/2017; 1:00 pm, SECN		Florida	L 56–66	15–10 (3–9)	Coleman Coliseum (1,721); Tuscaloosa, AL
02/16/2017; 7:00 pm		Tennessee	W 65–57	16–10 (4–9)	Coleman Coliseum (2,221); Tuscaloosa, AL
02/20/2017; 6:00 pm, SECN		at Auburn	W 63–61 ^{OT}	17–10 (5–9)	Auburn Arena (2,607); Auburn, AL
02/23/2017; 6:00 pm		at Georgia	L 65–71 ^{OT}	17–11 (5–10)	Stegeman Coliseum (2,787); Athens, GA
02/26/2017; 2:00 pm		No. 24 Missouri	L 56–65	17–12 (5–11)	Coleman Coliseum (2,467); Tuscaloosa, AL
SEC Women's Tournament
03/01/2017; 10:00 am, SECN	(12)	vs. (13) Vanderbilt; First Round	W 77–57	18–12	Bon Secours Wellness Arena (3,507); Greenville, SC
03/02/2017; 1:30 pm, SECN	(12)	vs. (5) Tennessee; Second Round	W 72–64	19–12	Bon Secours Wellness Arena (3,746); Greenville, SC
03/03/2017; 1:30 pm, SECN	(12)	vs. (4) No. 20 Kentucky; Quarterfinals	L 55–65	19–13	Bon Secours Wellness Arena (5,702); Greenville, SC
Women's National Invitation Tournament
03/16/2017*; 7:00 pm		Mercer; First Round	W 81–57	20–13	Coleman Coliseum (508); Tuscaloosa, AL
03/19/2017*; 2:00 pm		Little Rock; Second Round	W 55–53	21–13	Coleman Coliseum (495); Tuscaloosa, AL
03/23/2017*; 7:00 pm		Tulane; Third Round	W 72–64	22–13	Coleman Coliseum (1,054); Tuscaloosa, AL
03/26/2017*; 2:00 pm		at Georgia Tech; Quarterfinals	L 66–76	22–14	Hank McCamish Pavilion (821); Atlanta, GA
*Non-conference game. ^{#}Rankings from AP Poll. (#) Tournament seedings in parentheses. All times are in Central Time.

== Rankings ==
Regular season polls
Poll	Pre- Season	Week 2	Week 3	Week 4	Week 5	Week 6	Week 7	Week 8	Week 9	Week 10	Week 11	Week 12	Week 13	Week 14	Week 15	Week 16	Week 17	Week 18	Week 19	Final
AP	NR	NR	NR	NR	NR	NR	NR	NR	NR	RV	NR	NR	NR	NR	NR	NR	NR	NR	NR	N/A
Coaches	NR	NR	NR	NR	NR	NR	NR	NR	NR	NR	NR	NR	NR	NR	NR	NR	NR	NR	NR	NR

Legend
	Increase in ranking
	Decrease in ranking
	Not ranked previous week
(RV)	Received Votes

== See also ==
- 2016–17 Alabama Crimson Tide men's basketball team
