= 2016–17 Auburn Tigers women's basketball team =

Intercollegiate basketball season

2016–17 Auburn Tigers women's basketball

NCAA Women's Tournament, first round
- Conference: Southeastern Conference
- Record: 17–15 (7–9 SEC)
- Head coach: Terri Williams-Flournoy (5th season)
- Assistant coaches: Ty Evans; Adrian Walters; Clairsse Garcia
- Home arena: Auburn Arena

2016–17 SEC women's basketball standings
	Conf.				Overall
Team	W		L	PCT	W		L	PCT
No. 3 South Carolina†	14	–	2	.875	33	–	4	.892
No. 7 Mississippi State	13	–	3	.813	34	–	5	.872
No. 18 Kentucky	11	–	5	.688	22	–	11	.667
No. 25 Missouri	11	–	5	.688	21	–	11	.656
Tennessee	10	–	6	.625	20	–	12	.625
Texas A&M	9	–	7	.563	22	–	12	.647
LSU	8	–	8	.500	20	–	12	.625
Auburn	7	–	9	.438	17	–	15	.531
Georgia	7	–	9	.438	16	–	15	.516
Ole Miss	6	–	10	.375	17	–	14	.548
Alabama	5	–	11	.313	22	–	14	.611
Florida	5	–	11	.313	15	–	16	.484
Vanderbilt	4	–	12	.250	14	–	16	.467
Arkansas	2	–	14	.125	13	–	17	.433
† 2017 SEC tournament winner Rankings from AP poll

The 2016–17 Auburn Tigers women's basketball team represented Auburn University during the 2016–17 NCAA Division I women's basketball season. The Tigers, led by fifth-year head coach Terri Williams-Flournoy, played their home games at Auburn Arena and were members of the Southeastern Conference. They finished the season 17–15, 7–9 in SEC play to finish in a tie for eighth place. They lost in the second round of the SEC women's tournament to Georgia. They received an at-large bid to the NCAA women's tournament, where lost to NC State in the first round.

== Roster ==
2016–17 Auburn Tigers women's basketball team
Players
Coaches

Pos.	#	Name	Height	Year	Previous school	Hometown
G	0	Daisa Alexander	5 ft 8 in (1.73 m)	Fr	Southwest DeKalb	Decatur, GA
G	1	Tyra Johnson	5 ft 7 in (1.7 m)	Fr	Austin	Decatur, AL
G	2	Bria Johnson	5 ft 8 in (1.73 m)	Jr	Episcopal	Baton Rouge, LA
G	3	Erica Sanders	5 ft 10 in (1.78 m)	So	Johnson	San Antonio, TX
G	10	Brandy Montgomery	5 ft 10 in (1.78 m)	Sr	Lincoln Park Academy	Port St. Lucie, FL
C	12	Justice Wright (redshirt)	6 ft 4 in (1.93 m)	Jr	Houston County; Clemson	Warner Robins, GA
G/F	13	Katie Frerking	6 ft 1 in (1.85 m)	Jr	Wesleyan School	Johns Creek, GA
G	14	Tiffany Lewis	5 ft 8 in (1.73 m)	RS Jr	Riverdale; Clemson	Chattanooga, TN
F	15	Jazmine Jones	6 ft 2 in (1.88 m)	Jr	West Forsyth	Winston-Salem, NC
G	20	Sira Toure (redshirt)	6 ft 2 in (1.88 m)	Jr	Kamiakin; Weber State	Kennewick, WA
F	22	Ekiya Gray	6 ft 1 in (1.85 m)	Jr	Klein Forest; Blinn JC	Houston, TX
G	23	Jessica Jones	6 ft 2 in (1.88 m)	Jr	West Forsyth	Winston-Salem, NC
G	33	Janiah McKay	5 ft 6 in (1.68 m)	So	Gainesville	Gainesville, FL
G	40	Ndeye Dieng	5 ft 10 in (1.78 m)	Sr	Gatewood School	Dakar, Senegal

Head coach

- Terri Williams-Flournoy (Penn State)

Assistant coach(es)

- Ty Evans (UW–Whitewater)
- Adrian Walters (Saint Francis (PA))
- Clairsse Garcia (Villanova)

Legend

- (C) Team captain
- (S) Suspended
- (I) Ineligible
- (W) Walk-on
- Injured
- Current redshirt

Roster

== Schedule ==
Date time, TV	Rank^{#}	Opponent^{#}	Result	Record	Site (attendance) city, state
Non-conference regular season
11/11/2016*; 5:30 pm		Troy	W 61–52	1–0	Auburn Arena (2,336); Auburn, AL
11/17/2016*; 4:30 pm		at North Carolina A&T	W 68–36	2–0	Corbett Sports Center (538); Greensboro, NC
11/20/2016*; 2:30 pm		at East Carolina	W 61–52	3–0	Williams Arena (1,019); Greenville, NC
11/22/2016*; 3:30 pm		vs. Ball State; Savannah Invitational First Round	W 54–40	4–0	Savannah Civic Center; Savannah, GA
11/23/2016*; 6:00 pm		vs. Marist; Savannah Invitational Second Round	W 52–51	5–0	Savannah Civic Center (249); Savannah, GA
11/24/2016*; 6:00 pm		vs. No. 19 West Virginia; Savannah Invitational Third Round	L 52–56	5–1	Savannah Civic Center (417); Savannah, GA
11/27/2016*; 12:00 pm, SECN		Indiana	W 71–67	6–1	Auburn Arena (1,752); Auburn, AL
12/02/2016*; 7:00 pm	No. 23	at Kansas State; Big 12/SEC Women's Challenge	L 66–71	6–2	Bramlage Coliseum (4,160); Manhattan, KS
12/11/2016*; 2:00 pm		Savannah State	W 75–46	7–2	Auburn Arena (1,830); Auburn, AL
12/14/2016*; 6:30 pm		at Louisiana Tech	W 76–66	8–2	Thomas Assembly Center (1,526); Ruston, LA
12/18/2016*; 4:00 pm		No. 24 Virginia Tech	L 87–92 ^{OT}	8–3	Auburn Arena (2,158); Auburn, AL
12/21/2016*; 3:00 pm		vs. Drake; Tulane Classic semifinals	W 85–80	9–3	Devlin Fieldhouse (439); New Orleans, LA
12/22/2016*; 5:00 pm		at Tulane; Tulane Classic championship	L 59–61	9–4	Devlin Fieldhouse (873); New Orleans, LA
12/28/2016*; 6:00 pm		Jacksonville	W 53–41	10–4	Auburn Arena (1,803); Auburn, AL
SEC regular season
01/01/2017; 1:00 pm		at Florida	W 82–75	11–4 (1–0)	O'Connell Center (1,720); Gainesville, FL
01/05/2017; 6:00 pm		No. 5 South Carolina	L 47–73	11–5 (1–1)	Auburn Arena (2,144); Auburn, AL
01/08/2017; 3:00 pm, SECN		Ole Miss	W 83–60	12–5 (2–1)	Auburn Arena (2,313); Auburn, AL
01/12/2017; 7:00 pm		at Vanderbilt	W 64–59	13–5 (3–1)	Memorial Gymnasium (2,335); Nashville, TN
01/19/2017; 6:00 pm		Tennessee	W 79−61	14−5 (4−1)	Auburn Arena (2,290); Auburn, AL
01/22/2017; 6:00 pm, SECN		Kentucky	L 60–64	14–6 (4–2)	Auburn Arena (2,294); Auburn, AL
01/26/2017; 7:00 pm		at Missouri	L 53–68	14–7 (4–3)	Mizzou Arena (3,366); Columbia, MO
01/29/2017; 5:00 pm, SECN		at Alabama	W 66–55	15–7 (5–3)	Coleman Coliseum (3,453); Tuscaloosa, AL
02/02/2017; 8:00 pm, SECN		No. 5 Mississippi State	L 47–77	15–8 (5–4)	Auburn Arena (1,969); Auburn, AL
02/05/2017; 1:00 pm, SECN		at Texas A&M	L 61–66	15–9 (5–5)	Reed Arena (5,012); College Station, TX
02/09/2017; 6:00 pm		at No. 6 South Carolina	L 41–60	15–10 (5–6)	Colonial Life Arena (13,360); Columbia, SC
02/12/2017; 2:00 pm		Georgia	L 51–57	15–11 (5–7)	Auburn Arena (3,464); Auburn, AL
02/16/2017; 8:00 pm, SECN		at Ole Miss	L 59–63	15–12 (5–8)	The Pavilion at Ole Miss (1,046); Oxford, MS
02/20/2017; 6:00 pm, SECN		Alabama	L 61–63 ^{OT}	15–13 (5–9)	Auburn Arena (2,607); Auburn, AL
02/23/2017; 6:00 pm		LSU	W 54–49	16–13 (6–9)	Auburn Arena (2,889); Auburn, AL
02/26/2017; 2:00 pm, SECN		at Arkansas	W 70–64	17–13 (7–9)	Bud Walton Arena (1,685); Fayetteville, AR
SEC Women's Tournament
03/02/2017; 11:00 am, SECN	(9)	vs. (8) Georgia; Second Round	L 52–56	17–14	Bon Secours Wellness Arena; Greenville, SC
NCAA tournament
03/17/2017*; 11:00 am, ESPN2	(11 L)	vs. (6 L) No. 17 NC State; First Round	L 48–62	17–15	Frank Erwin Center; Austin, TX
*Non-conference game. ^{#}Rankings from AP Poll. (#) Tournament seedings in parentheses. L=Lexington Region. All times are in Central Time.

== Rankings ==
Regular season polls
Poll	Pre- season	Week 2	Week 3	Week 4	Week 5	Week 6	Week 7	Week 8	Week 9	Week 10	Week 11	Week 12	Week 13	Week 14	Week 15	Week 16	Week 17	Week 18	Week 19	Final
AP	RV	RV	RV	23	RV	RV	RV	NR	NR	NR	NR	NR	NR	NR	NR	NR	NR	NR	NR	N/A
Coaches	RV	RV	RV	RV	NR	RV	NR	NR	NR	NR	NR	NR	NR	NR	NR	NR	NR	NR	NR	NR

Legend
	Increase in ranking
	Decrease in ranking
	No change
(RV)	Received votes
(NR)	Not ranked

== See also ==
- 2016–17 Auburn Tigers men's basketball team
