= 2016–17 Missouri Tigers women's basketball team =

Intercollegiate basketball season

2016–17 Missouri Tigers women's basketball

NCAA tournament, second round
- Conference: Southeastern Conference

Ranking
- AP: No. 25
- Record: 22–11 (11–5 SEC)
- Head coach: Robin Pingeton (7th season)
- Assistant coaches: Jenny Putnam; Ashleen Bracey
- Home arena: Mizzou Arena

2016–17 SEC women's basketball standings
	Conf.				Overall
Team	W		L	PCT	W		L	PCT
No. 3 South Carolina†	14	–	2	.875	33	–	4	.892
No. 7 Mississippi State	13	–	3	.813	34	–	5	.872
No. 18 Kentucky	11	–	5	.688	22	–	11	.667
No. 25 Missouri	11	–	5	.688	21	–	11	.656
Tennessee	10	–	6	.625	20	–	12	.625
Texas A&M	9	–	7	.563	22	–	12	.647
LSU	8	–	8	.500	20	–	12	.625
Auburn	7	–	9	.438	17	–	15	.531
Georgia	7	–	9	.438	16	–	15	.516
Ole Miss	6	–	10	.375	17	–	14	.548
Alabama	5	–	11	.313	22	–	14	.611
Florida	5	–	11	.313	15	–	16	.484
Vanderbilt	4	–	12	.250	14	–	16	.467
Arkansas	2	–	14	.125	13	–	17	.433
† 2017 SEC tournament winner Rankings from AP poll

The 2016–17 Missouri Tigers women's basketball team represented the University of Missouri in the 2016–17 NCAA Division I women's basketball season. The Tigers were led by seventh-year head coach Robin Pingeton. They played their games at Mizzou Arena and were members of the Southeastern Conference. They finished the season 22–11, 11–5 in SEC play to finish in a tie for fourth place. They lost in the quarterfinals of the SEC women's tournament to Texas A&M. They received an at-large bid to the NCAA women's tournament, where they defeated South Florida in the first round before losing to Florida State in the second round.

== Roster ==
2016–17 Missouri Tigers women's basketball team
Players
Coaches

Pos.	#	Name	Height	Year	Previous school	Hometown
G	1	Lianna Doty	5 ft 7 in (1.7 m)	RS Sr	Kirkwood	St. Louis, MO
G	2	Jordan Roundtree	5 ft 9 in (1.75 m)	Fr	Kirkwood	St. Louis, MO
G	3	Sophie Cunningham	6 ft 1 in (1.85 m)	So	Rock Bridge	Columbia, MO
F	4	Bri Porter	6 ft 3 in (1.91 m)	Jr	Rock Bridge	Columbia, MO
G	5	Lauren Alridge (redshirt)	5 ft 7 in (1.7 m)	Jr	Marshfield	Marshfield, MO
G	10	Jordan Chavis	5 ft 7 in (1.7 m)	Fr	Central Davidson	Lexington, NC
G	11	Lindsey Cunningham	6 ft 0 in (1.83 m)	RS Sr	Rock Bridge	Columbia, MO
F	13	Hannah Schuchts	6 ft 2 in (1.88 m)	RS Fr	Maclay School	Tallahassee, FL
F	20	Kayla McDowell	6 ft 2 in (1.88 m)	RS Jr	Mason	Cincinnati, OH
F	21	Cierra Porter	6 ft 4 in (1.93 m)	So	Rock Bridge	Columbia, MO
G/F	22	Jordan Fereicks	6 ft 1 in (1.85 m)	Sr	Quincy Notre Dame	Quincy, IL
G	23	Amber Smith	5 ft 11 in (1.8 m)	Fr	Loyola College Prep	Shreveport, LA
G	24	Sierra Michaelis	5 ft 10 in (1.78 m)	Sr	North Mercer	Mercer, MO

Head coach

- Robin Pingeton (St. Ambrose)

Assistant coach(es)

- Jenny Putnam (St. Ambrose)
- Ashleen Bracey (Illinois State)

Legend

- (C) Team captain
- (S) Suspended
- (I) Ineligible
- (W) Walk-on
- Injured
- Current redshirt

Roster

== Schedule and results ==
Date time, TV	Rank^{#}	Opponent^{#}	Result	Record	Site (attendance) city, state
Exhibition
11/01/2016*; 7:00 pm	No. 24	Central Missouri	W 65–35		Mizzou Arena; Columbia, MO
11/07/2016*; 7:00 pm	No. 24	Truman State	W 87–53		Mizzou Arena (1,673); Columbia, MO
Non-conference regular season
11/11/2016*; 7:00 pm	No. 24	Abilene Christian; Preseason WNIT first round	W 52–46	1–0	Mizzou Arena (2,056); Columbia, MO
11/14/2016*; 7:00 pm	No. 25	at Nebraska; Preseason WNIT quarterfinals	W 55–35	2–0	Pinnacle Bank Arena (4,207); Lincoln, NE
11/17/2016*; 7:00 pm	No. 25	at No. 17 Washington; Preseason WNIT semifinals	L 66–79	2–1	Alaska Airlines Arena (1,701); Seattle, WA
11/22/2016*; 7:00 pm		Indiana State	W 77–48	3–1	Mizzou Arena (2,129); Columbia, MO
11/25/2016*; 2:15 pm		vs. Creighton; Junkanoo Jam Freeport Division semifinals	W 72–63	4–1	St. George HS Gymnasium (437); Freeport, BAH
11/26/2016*; 2:15 pm		vs. Georgia Tech; Junkanoo Jam Freeport Division championship	L 70–72	4–2	St. George HS Gymnasium; Freeport, BAH
11/29/2016*; 7:00 pm		Western Illinois	W 71–68	5–2	Mizzou Arena (1,843); Columbia, MO
12/02/2016*; 7:00 pm		Missouri State	W 73–49	6–2	Mizzou Arena (2,632); Columbia, MO
12/04/2016*; 1:00 pm		at IUPUI	L 45–73	6–3	The Jungle (505); Indianapolis, IN
12/07/2016*; 7:00 pm		SIU Edwardsville	W 72–60	7–3	Mizzou Arena (1,494); Columbia, MO
12/09/2016*; 7:00 pm		Wichita State	W 64–57	8–3	Mizzou Arena (2,068); Columbia, MO
12/17/2016*; 11:00 am		UT Martin	W 80–69	9–3	Mizzou Arena (2,545); Columbia, MO
12/19/2016*; 7:00 pm		UC Riverside	W 68–62	10–3	Mizzou Arena; Columbia, MO
12/21/2016*; 7:00 pm		at Saint Louis	L 61–72	10–4	Chaifetz Arena (6,288); St. Louis, MO
SEC regular season
01/01/2017; 12:00 pm, SECN		Georgia	W 63–45	11–4 (1–0)	Mizzou Arena (3,879); Columbia, MO
01/05/2017; 6:00 pm, SECN		at No. 24 Kentucky	L 62–64	11–5 (1–1)	Memorial Coliseum (4,280); Lexington, KY
01/08/2017; 2:00 pm		Alabama	L 58–59	11–6 (1–2)	Mizzou Arena (4,287); Columbia, MO
01/12/2017; 7:00 pm		at LSU	L 71–80	11–7 (1–3)	Maravich Center (2,001); Baton Rouge, LA
01/15/2017; 2:00 pm		at Vanderbilt	W 74–68	12–7 (2–3)	Memorial Gymnasium (2,504); Nashville, TN
01/19/2017; 8:00 pm, SECN		No. 25 Texas A&M	W 78–76 ^{OT}	13–7 (3–3)	Mizzou Arena (3,587); Columbia, MO
01/23/2017; 6:00 pm, SECN		at Arkansas	W 60–46	14–7 (4–3)	Bud Walton Arena (822); Fayetteville, AR
01/26/2017; 7:00 pm		Auburn	W 68–53	15–7 (5–3)	Mizzou Arena (3,366); Columbia, MO
01/30/2017; 6:00 pm, SECN		No. 25 Kentucky	W 73–67	16–7 (6–3)	Mizzou Arena (3,374); Columbia, MO
02/05/2017; 1:30 pm, ESPNU		at No. 5 Mississippi State	L 53–70	16–8 (6–4)	Humphrey Coliseum (5,792); Starkville, MS
02/09/2017; 6:00 pm, SECN		at No. 24 Tennessee	L 66–77	16–9 (6–5)	Thompson–Boling Arena (8,041); Knoxville, TN
02/12/2017; 5:00 pm, SECN		Arkansas	W 67–56	17–9 (7–5)	Mizzou Arena (5,163); Columbia, MO
02/16/2017; 6:00 pm		at Florida	W 74–67	18–9 (8–5)	O'Connell Center (1,571); Gainesville, FL
02/19/2017; 2:00 pm, ESPN2		No. 6 South Carolina	W 62–60	19–9 (9–5)	Mizzou Arena (5,789); Columbia, MO
02/23/2017; 7:00 pm	No. 24	Ole Miss	W 100–65	20–9 (10–5)	Mizzou Arena (5,173); Columbia, MO
02/26/2017; 2:00 pm	No. 24	at Alabama	W 65–56	21–9 (11–5)	Coleman Coliseum (2,467); Tuscaloosa, AL
SEC Women's Tournament
03/03/2017; 7:30 pm, SECN	(3) No. 23	vs. (6) Texas A&M; Quarterfinals	L 48–62	21–10	Bon Secours Wellness Arena; Greenville, SC
NCAA Women's Tournament
03/17/2017*; 4:00 pm, ESPN2	(6 S) No. 25	vs. (11 S) South Florida; First Round	W 66–64	22–10	Donald L. Tucker Center; Tallahassee, FL
03/19/2017*; 6:00 pm, ESPN2	(6 S) No. 25	at (3 S) No. 10 Florida State; Second Round	L 55–77	22–11	Donald L. Tucker Center (4,084); Tallahassee, FL
*Non-conference game. ^{#}Rankings from AP Poll. (#) Tournament seedings in parentheses. S=Stockton Region. All times are in Central Time.

== Rankings ==
Regular season polls
Poll	Pre- season	Week 2	Week 3	Week 4	Week 5	Week 6	Week 7	Week 8	Week 9	Week 10	Week 11	Week 12	Week 13	Week 14	Week 15	Week 16	Week 17	Week 18	Week 19	Final
AP	24	25	RV	RV	NR	NR	NR	NR	NR	NR	NR	NR	NR	RV	NR	24	23	25	25	N/A
Coaches	RV	RV	RV	RV	NR	NR	NR	NR	NR	NR	NR	NR	NR	NR	NR	RV	RV	RV	RV	RV

Legend
	Increase in ranking
	Decrease in ranking
	Not ranked previous week
(RV)	Received votes

== See also ==
- 2016–17 Missouri Tigers men's basketball team
