= 2016–17 Arkansas Razorbacks women's basketball team =

Intercollegiate basketball season

2016–17 Arkansas Razorbacks women's basketball

Nugget Classic champions
- Conference: Southeastern Conference
- Record: 13–17 (2–14 SEC)
- Head coach: Jimmy Dykes (3rd season)
- Assistant coaches: Chenel Harris; Tari Cummings; Tommy Deffebaugh
- Home arena: Bud Walton Arena

2016–17 SEC women's basketball standings
	Conf.				Overall
Team	W		L	PCT	W		L	PCT
No. 3 South Carolina†	14	–	2	.875	33	–	4	.892
No. 7 Mississippi State	13	–	3	.813	34	–	5	.872
No. 18 Kentucky	11	–	5	.688	22	–	11	.667
No. 25 Missouri	11	–	5	.688	21	–	11	.656
Tennessee	10	–	6	.625	20	–	12	.625
Texas A&M	9	–	7	.563	22	–	12	.647
LSU	8	–	8	.500	20	–	12	.625
Auburn	7	–	9	.438	17	–	15	.531
Georgia	7	–	9	.438	16	–	15	.516
Ole Miss	6	–	10	.375	17	–	14	.548
Alabama	5	–	11	.313	22	–	14	.611
Florida	5	–	11	.313	15	–	16	.484
Vanderbilt	4	–	12	.250	14	–	16	.467
Arkansas	2	–	14	.125	13	–	17	.433
† 2017 SEC tournament winner Rankings from AP poll

The 2016–17 Arkansas Razorbacks women's basketball team represented the University of Arkansas in the 2016–17 NCAA Division I women's basketball season. The Razorbacks, led by third year head coach Jimmy Dykes, play their games at Bud Walton Arena and are members of the Southeastern Conference. They finished the season 13–17, 2–14 in SEC play to finish in last place. They lost in the first round of the SEC women's tournament to Florida.

On March 3, Jimmy Dykes resigned as head coach. He finished at Arkansas with a 3-year record of 43–49.

== Roster ==
2016–17 Arkansas Razorbacks women's basketball team
Players
Coaches

Pos.	#	Name	Height	Year	Previous school	Hometown
F	00	Jessica Jackson	6 ft 3 in (1.91 m)	Sr	Jacksonville HS	Jacksonville, AR
G/F	2	Aaliyah Wilson	5 ft 10 in (1.78 m)	Fr	Muskogee HS	Muskogee, OK
G	3	Malica Monk	5 ft 5 in (1.65 m)	So	North Little Rock HS	North Little Rock, AR
G/F	4	Keiryn Swenson	6 ft 1 in (1.85 m)	So	Maize HS	Wichita, KS
F/C	10	Kiara Williams	6 ft 1 in (1.85 m)	Fr	Little Rock Central HS	Little Rock, AR
G	14	Jailyn Mason	5 ft 9 in (1.75 m)	Fr	William Mason HS	Mason, OH
G	15	Kelsey Brooks	5 ft 9 in (1.75 m)	Sr	Olathe Northwest HS	Lenexa, KS
F	20	Sydney Stout	6 ft 0 in (1.83 m)	Fr	Bixby HS	Bixby, OK
G	21	Devin Cosper	5 ft 10 in (1.78 m)	Jr	Field Kindley HS; Coffeyville CC	Coffeyville, KS
G/F	22	Bailey Zimmerman	6 ft 0 in (1.83 m)	So	Wonderview HS	Hattieville, KS
C	35	Alecia Cooley	6 ft 4 in (1.93 m)	Sr	Township HS; State Fair CC	Evanston, IL
C	42	Yasmeen Ratliff	6 ft 5 in (1.96 m)	Fr	St. Francis Day HS	Alpharetta, GA

Head coach

- Jimmy Dykes (Arkansas)

Assistant coach(es)

- Chenel Harris (Kent State)
- Tari Cummings (Oklahoma State)
- Tommy Deffebaugh (Drury)

Legend

- (C) Team captain
- (S) Suspended
- (I) Ineligible
- (W) Walk-on
- Injured
- Current redshirt

Roster

== Schedule ==
Date time, TV	Rank^{#}	Opponent^{#}	Result	Record	Site (attendance) city, state
Exhibition
11/03/2016*; 7:00 pm		Oklahoma Baptist	W 79–32		Bud Walton Arena (1,238); Fayetteville, AR
Non-conference regular season
11/11/2016*; 10:30 am		Sam Houston State	W 71–39	1–0	Bud Walton Arena (4,330); Fayetteville, AR
11/13/2016*; 2:00 pm		Louisiana–Monroe	W 92–46	2–0	Bud Walton Arena (3,156); Fayetteville, AR
11/17/2016*; 7:00 pm		South Dakota	W 70–67	3–0	Bud Walton Arena (1,054); Fayetteville, AR
11/21/2016*; 7:00 pm		Stetson	W 79–62	4–0	Bud Walton Arena (1,179); Fayetteville, AR
11/25/2016*; 6:30 pm		vs. Memphis; Nugget Classic semifinals	W 91–61	5–0	Lawlor Events Center (1,662); Reno, NV
11/26/2016*; 6:30 pm		vs. Navy; Nugget Classic championship	W 70–67	6–0	Lawlor Events Center (838); Reno, NV
11/30/2016*; 7:00 pm, CST		at Tulsa	W 57–50	7–0	Reynolds Center (514); Tulsa, OK
12/03/2016*; 3:00 pm, SECN		Texas Tech; Big 12/SEC Women's Challenge	W 66–60	8–0	Bud Walton Arena (1,370); Fayetteville, AR
12/07/2016*; 7:00 pm		Butler	W 68–50	9–0	Bud Walton Arena (1,017); Fayetteville, AR
12/11/2016*; 2:00 pm, ESPN3		at Missouri State	L 62–64	9–1	JQH Arena (3,094); Springfield, MO
12/18/2016*; 2:00 pm		Northwestern State	W 65–36	10–1	Bud Walton Arena (1,025); Fayetteville, AR
12/21/2016*; 1:00 pm		Oral Roberts	L 60–70	10–2	Bud Walton Arena (1,721); Fayetteville, AR
12/28/2016*; 7:00 pm		Houston Baptist	W 101–40	11–2	Bud Walton Arena (1,361); Fayetteville, AR
SEC regular season
01/01/2017; 4:00 pm, SECN		at Ole Miss	L 64–73	11–3 (0–1)	The Pavilion at Ole Miss (1,280); Oxford, MS
01/05/2017; 7:00 pm		No. 4 Mississippi State	L 51–59	11–4 (0–2)	Bud Walton Arena (1,233); Fayetteville, AR
01/08/2017; 2:00 pm		LSU	L 52–53	11–5 (0–3)	Bud Walton Arena (2,005); Fayetteville, AR
01/12/2017; 7:00 pm		at Texas A&M	L 65–90	11–6 (0–4)	Reed Arena (3,796); College Station, TX
01/15/2017; 4:00 pm, SECN		at Alabama	W 68–50	12–6 (1–4)	Coleman Coliseum (2,667); Tuscaloosa, AL
01/19/2017; 7:00 pm		Vanderbilt	W 59–56	13–6 (2–4)	Bud Walton Arena (1,302); Fayetteville, AR
01/23/2017; 6:00 pm, SECN		Missouri	L 46–60	13–7 (2–5)	Bud Walton Arena (1,250); Fayetteville, AR
01/29/2017; 1:00 pm, SECN		at LSU	L 46–53	13–8 (2–6)	Maravich Center (2,182); Baton Rouge, LA
02/02/2017; 8:00 pm		Georgia	L 66–69	13–9 (2–7)	Bud Walton Arena (1,603); Fayetteville, AR
02/05/2017; 1:00 pm, ESPN2		No. 4 South Carolina	L 49–79	13–10 (2–8)	Bud Walton Arena (1,650); Fayetteville, AR
02/09/2017; 6:00 pm		at Florida	L 53–57	13–11 (2–9)	O'Connell Center (1,441); Gainesville, FL
02/12/2017; 5:00 pm, SECN		at Missouri	L 56–67	13–12 (2–10)	Mizzou Arena (5,163); Columbia, MO
02/16/2017; 7:00 pm		Kentucky	L 62–69	13–13 (2–11)	Bud Walton Arena (1,142); Fayetteville, AR
02/19/2017; 2:00 pm, SECN		at Tennessee	L 46–59	13–14 (2–12)	Thompson–Boling Arena (10,613); Knoxville, TN
02/23/2017; 7:00 pm		at Vanderbilt	L 64–66	13–15 (2–13)	Memorial Gymnasium (2,450); Nashville, TN
02/26/2017; 2:00 pm, SECN		Auburn	L 64–70	13–16 (2–14)	Bud Walton Arena (1,224); Fayetteville, AR
SEC Women's Tournament
03/01/2017; 12:00 pm, SECN	(14)	vs. (11) Florida; First Round	L 61–71	13–17	Bon Secours Wellness Arena (3,507); Greenville, SC
*Non-conference game. ^{#}Rankings from AP Polls. (#) Tournament seedings in parentheses. All times are in Central Time.

== See also ==
- 2016–17 Arkansas Razorbacks men's basketball team
