= 2016–17 LSU Lady Tigers basketball team =

Intercollegiate basketball season

2016–17 LSU Lady Tigers basketball

NCAA Women's tournament, first round
- Conference: Southeastern Conference
- Record: 20–12 (8–8 SEC)
- Head coach: Nikki Fargas (6th season)
- Assistant coaches: Tasha Butts; Mickie DeMoss; Charlene Thomas-Swinson
- Home arena: Pete Maravich Assembly Center

2016–17 SEC women's basketball standings
	Conf.				Overall
Team	W		L	PCT	W		L	PCT
No. 3 South Carolina†	14	–	2	.875	33	–	4	.892
No. 7 Mississippi State	13	–	3	.813	34	–	5	.872
No. 18 Kentucky	11	–	5	.688	22	–	11	.667
No. 25 Missouri	11	–	5	.688	21	–	11	.656
Tennessee	10	–	6	.625	20	–	12	.625
Texas A&M	9	–	7	.563	22	–	12	.647
LSU	8	–	8	.500	20	–	12	.625
Auburn	7	–	9	.438	17	–	15	.531
Georgia	7	–	9	.438	16	–	15	.516
Ole Miss	6	–	10	.375	17	–	14	.548
Alabama	5	–	11	.313	22	–	14	.611
Florida	5	–	11	.313	15	–	16	.484
Vanderbilt	4	–	12	.250	14	–	16	.467
Arkansas	2	–	14	.125	13	–	17	.433
† 2017 SEC tournament winner Rankings from AP poll

The 2016–17 LSU Lady Tigers basketball team represented Louisiana State University during the 2016–17 NCAA Division I women's basketball season college basketball season. The Lady Tigers, led by sixth year head coach Nikki Fargas, played their home games at Pete Maravich Assembly Center as members of the Southeastern Conference. They finished the season 20–12, 8–8 in SEC play to finish in seventh place. They defeated Ole Miss in the second round advanced to the quarterfinals of the SEC women's tournament to Mississippi State. They received an at-large bid to the NCAA women's tournament where they lost to California in the first round.

== Roster ==
2016–17 LSU Tigers women's basketball team
Players
Coaches

Pos.	#	Name	Height	Year	Previous school	Hometown
G	0	Chloe Jackson	5 ft 9 in (1.75 m)	RS So	Riverdale Baptist; NC State	Upper Marlboro, MD
G	1	Jenna Deemer	5 ft 7 in (1.7 m)	Jr	Ursuline Academy	New Orleans, LA
G	2	Shanice Norton	5 ft 8 in (1.73 m)	So	Potter's House Christian Academy	London, England
F	5	Ayana Mitchell	6 ft 2 in (1.88 m)	RS Fr	Salem HS	Conyers, GA
G	10	Jasmine Rhodes	5 ft 10 in (1.78 m)	Sr	Faith Academy	Mobile, AL
G	11	Raigyne Moncrief	5 ft 10 in (1.78 m)	Sr	American Heritage HS	Fort Lauderdale, FL
G	13	Rina Hill	5 ft 7 in (1.7 m)	Sr	IMG Academy	Nagoya-Shi, Japan
F/C	15	Yasmine Bidikuindila	6 ft 6 in (1.98 m)	Fr	Champlain College	Montreal, QE
F	20	Alexis Hyder	5 ft 11 in (1.8 m)	RS Sr	Lyndon B. Johnson Early College HS; North Texas	Austin, TX
F	23	Stephanie Amichia	6 ft 1 in (1.85 m)	Jr	North Gwinnett HS	Suwanee, GA
G	30	Jaelyn Richard Harris	5 ft 4 in (1.63 m)	Fr	Dekaney HS	Houston, TX
C	40	Faustine Aifuwa	6 ft 5 in (1.96 m)	Fr	Dacula HS	Dacula, GA
F	44	Tatum Neubert	6 ft 2 in (1.88 m)	RS So	Elizabeth HS; Oregon	Elizabeth, CO

Head coach

- Nikki Fargas (Tennessee)

Assistant coach(es)

- Tasha Butts (Tennessee)
- Mickie DeMoss (Louisiana Tech)
- Charlene Thomas-Swinson (Auburn)

Legend

- (C) Team captain
- (S) Suspended
- (I) Ineligible
- (W) Walk-on
- Injured
- Current redshirt

Roster

== Schedule and results ==
Date time, TV	Rank^{#}	Opponent^{#}	Result	Record	Site (attendance) city, state
Exhibition
11/06/2016*; 2:00 pm		LeMoyne–Owen	W 81–34		Maravich Center (677); Baton Rouge, LA
Non-conference regular season
11/11/2016*; 6:30 pm		at Louisiana Tech	W 77–73	1–0	Thomas Assembly Center (4,441); Ruston, LA
11/13/2016*; 6:00 pm		Wake Forest	W 60–57	2–0	Maravich Center (1,728); Baton Rouge, LA
11/16/2016*; 7:00 pm		Rice	W 66–55	3–0	Maravich Center (1,602); Baton Rouge, LA
11/20/2016*; 4:30 pm, ESPN		No. 3 Connecticut	L 53–76	3–1	Maravich Center (3,806); Baton Rouge, LA
11/24/2016*; 2:15 pm		vs. UTEP; Paradise Jam tournament Island Division	W 78–45	4–1	Sports and Fitness Center (276); Saint Thomas, USVI
11/25/2016*; 12:00 pm		vs. Kansas State; Paradise Jam Tournament Island Division	L 54–69	4–2	Sports and Fitness Center; Saint Thomas, USVI
11/26/2016*; 12:00 pm		vs. NC State; Paradise Jam Tournament Island Division	W 59–58	5–2	Sports and Fitness Center; Saint Thomas, USVI
12/04/2016*; 1:00 pm, SECN		TCU; Big 12/SEC Women's Challenge	W 67–61	6–2	Maravich Center (1,809); Baton Rouge, LA
12/11/2016*; 2:00 pm		Tulane	W 69–51	7–2	Maravich Center (2,164); Baton Rouge, LA
12/14/2016*; 11:00 am		Sam Houston State	W 89–41	8–2	Maravich Center (4,777); Baton Rouge, LA
12/18/2016*; 2:00 pm		vs. North Carolina; Crescom Bank Holiday Invitational	W 70–43	9–2	Myrtle Beach Convention Center (1,452); Myrtle Beach, SC
12/21/2016*; 7:00 pm		Little Rock	W 69–49	10–2	Maravich Center (1,820); Baton Rouge, LA
12/28/2016*; 6:00 pm		Alabama State	W 93–40	11–2	Maravich Center (2,037); Baton Rouge, LA
SEC regular season
01/01/2017; 2:00 pm, SECN		at No. 5 Mississippi State	L 48–74	11–3 (0–1)	Humphrey Coliseum (5,849); Starkville, MS
01/05/2017; 7:00 pm		Florida	W 78–67	12–3 (1–1)	Maravich Center (1,802); Baton Rouge, LA
01/08/2017; 2:00 pm		at Arkansas	W 53–52	13–3 (2–1)	Bud Walton Arena (2,005); Fayetteville, AR
01/12/2017; 7:00 pm		Missouri	W 80–71	14–3 (3–1)	Maravich Center (2,001); Baton Rouge, LA
01/15/2017; 2:00 pm		No. 5 South Carolina	L 61–84	14–4 (3–2)	Maravich Center (2,840); Baton Rouge, LA
01/19/2017; 7:00 pm		Kentucky	L 42–55	14–5 (3–3)	Maravich Center (1,875); Baton Rouge, LA
01/22/2017; 4:00 pm, SECN		at No. 25 Texas A&M	L 52–54	14–6 (3–4)	Reed Arena (4,639); College Station, TX
01/29/2017; 1:00 pm, SECN		at Arkansas	W 53–46	15–6 (4–4)	Maravich Center (2,182); Baton Rouge, LA
02/02/2017; 6:00 pm		at Tennessee	L 58–77	15–7 (4–5)	Thompson–Boling Arena (10,209); Knoxville, TN
02/05/2017; 3:00 pm, SECN		Alabama	W 48–41	16–7 (5–5)	Maravich Center (2,383); Baton Rouge, LA
02/09/2017; 6:00 pm		at Ole Miss	W 62–51	17–7 (6–5)	The Pavilion at Ole Miss (729); Oxford, MS
02/13/2017; 6:00 pm, SECN		at Vanderbilt	L 58–60	17–8 (6–6)	Memorial Gymnasium (2,324); Nashville, TN
02/16/2017; 7:00 pm		No. 23 Texas A&M	W 67–63	18–8 (7–6)	Maravich Center (1,926); Baton Rouge, LA
02/19/2017; 1:00 pm		at Georgia	L 65–70 ^{OT}	18–9 (7–7)	Stegeman Coliseum (4,516); Athens, GA
02/23/2017; 6:00 pm		at Auburn	L 49–54	18–10 (7–8)	Auburn Arena (2,889); Auburn, AL
02/26/2017; 12:00 pm, SECN		Vanderbilt	W 64–58	19–10 (8–8)	Maravich Center (2,005); Baton Rouge, LA
SEC Women's tournament
03/02/2017; 5:00 pm, SECN	(7)	vs. (10) Ole Miss; Second Round	W 65–49	20–10	Bon Secours Wellness Arena; Greenville, SC
03/03/2017; 5:00 pm, SECN	(7)	vs. (2) No. 6 Mississippi State; Quarterfinals	L 61–78	20–11	Bon Secours Wellness Arena (7,754); Greenville, SC
NCAA Women's tournament
03/18/2017*; 8:00 pm, ESPN2	(8 O)	vs. (9 O) California; First Round	L 52–55	20–12	Ferrell Center (4,169); Waco, TX
*Non-conference game. ^{#}Rankings from AP Poll. (#) Tournament seedings in parentheses. O=Oklahoma City Region. All times are in Central Time.

== Rankings ==
2016–17 NCAA Division I women's basketball rankings

Regular season polls
Poll	Pre- Season	Week 2	Week 3	Week 4	Week 5	Week 6	Week 7	Week 8	Week 9	Week 10	Week 11	Week 12	Week 13	Week 14	Week 15	Week 16	Week 17	Week 18	Week 19	Final
AP	NR	NR	NR	NR	NR	NR	NR	NR	NR	RV	RV	NR	NR	NR	NR	RV	NR	NR	NR	N/A
Coaches	NR	NR	NR	NR	NR	NR	NR	RV	NR	NR	NR	NR	NR	NR	NR	NR	NR	NR	NR	NR

Legend
	Increase in ranking
	Decrease in ranking
	Not ranked previous week
(RV)	Received Votes

== See also ==
- 2016–17 LSU Tigers basketball team
