= 2016–17 Florida Gators women's basketball team =

Intercollegiate basketball season

2016–17 Florida Gators women's basketball
- Conference: Southeastern Conference
- Record: 15–16 (5–11 SEC)
- Head coach: Amanda Butler (10th season)
- Assistant coaches: Bill Ferrara; Shimmy Gray-Miller; Murriel Page
- Home arena: O'Connell Center

2016–17 SEC women's basketball standings
	Conf.				Overall
Team	W		L	PCT	W		L	PCT
No. 3 South Carolina†	14	–	2	.875	33	–	4	.892
No. 7 Mississippi State	13	–	3	.813	34	–	5	.872
No. 18 Kentucky	11	–	5	.688	22	–	11	.667
No. 25 Missouri	11	–	5	.688	21	–	11	.656
Tennessee	10	–	6	.625	20	–	12	.625
Texas A&M	9	–	7	.563	22	–	12	.647
LSU	8	–	8	.500	20	–	12	.625
Auburn	7	–	9	.438	17	–	15	.531
Georgia	7	–	9	.438	16	–	15	.516
Ole Miss	6	–	10	.375	17	–	14	.548
Alabama	5	–	11	.313	22	–	14	.611
Florida	5	–	11	.313	15	–	16	.484
Vanderbilt	4	–	12	.250	14	–	16	.467
Arkansas	2	–	14	.125	13	–	17	.433
† 2017 SEC tournament winner Rankings from AP poll

The 2016–17 Florida Gators women's basketball team represented the University of Florida in the sport of basketball during the 2016–17 women's college basketball season. The Gators compete in Division I of the National Collegiate Athletic Association (NCAA) as members of the Southeastern Conference (SEC). The Gators, led by tenth-year head coach Amanda Butler, played their home games in the O'Connell Center on the university's Gainesville, Florida campus. They finished the season 15–16, 5–11 in SEC play to finish in a tie for eleventh place. They advanced to the second round of SEC women's tournament where they lost to Texas A&M.

On March 6, the school fired Amanda Butler. She finished at Florida with a 10 year record of 190–136.

== Previous season ==
The Gators finished the season 22–9, 10–6 in SEC play to finish in a tie for fourth place. They lost in the quarterfinals of the SEC women's tournament to Kentucky. They received an at-large bid to the NCAA women's tournament where they were upset by Albany in the first round.

== Roster ==
2016–17 Florida Gators women's basketball team
Players
Coaches

Pos.	#	Name	Height	Year	Hometown
G	1	Delicia Washington	5 ft 10 in (1.78 m)	Fr	Glen St. Mary, Florida
F	1	Ronni Williams	6 ft 0 in (1.83 m)	Sr	Daytona Beach, Florida
G	3	Funda Nakkaşoğlu	5 ft 8 in (1.73 m)	Jr	Hampton, Australia
G	5	Elif Portakal	5 ft 9 in (1.75 m)	Fr	Istanbul, Turkey
G	11	Dyandria Anderson	5 ft 10 in (1.78 m)	Jr	Viera, Florida
G	15	Sydney Searcy	5 ft 7 in (1.7 m)	Fr	Ponte Vedra Beach, Florida
G	20	Simone Westbrook	5 ft 8 in (1.73 m)	Sr	Chandler, Arizona
G/F	21	Eleanna Christinaki	5 ft 11 in (1.8 m)	So	Paralimni, Greece
G/F	22	Sydney Morang	5 ft 10 in (1.78 m)	Fr	New Providence, New Jersey
F	23	Brooke Copeland	6 ft 2 in (1.88 m)	Jr	Cleveland, Tennessee
C	24	Tyshara Fleming	6 ft 4 in (1.93 m)	Sr	Virginia Beach, Virginia
F	44	Haley Lorenzen	6 ft 3 in (1.91 m)	Jr	Iowa City, Iowa

Head coach

- Amanda Butler (10th year)

Assistant coach(es)

- Bill Ferrara (2nd year)
- Shimmy Gray-Miller (2nd year)
- Murriel Page (7th year)

Legend

- (C) Team captain
- (S) Suspended
- (I) Ineligible
- (W) Walk-on
- Injured
- Current redshirt

Roster
Last update: 2016-09-26

=== Coaches ===
Name	Position	College	Graduating year
Amanda Butler	Head coach	University of Florida	1995
Bill Ferrara	Assistant coach	University of Florida	2003
Shimmy Gray-Miller	Assistant coach	University of Michigan	2000
Murriel Page	Assistant coach	University of Florida	1998
Ryan Gensler	Video coordinator	Providence College	2011
Shellie Greenman	Program assistant	Emory and Henry College	1988
Serena Wilson	Director of basketball operations	University of Florida	2008
Tyler Stuart	Strength & conditioning coordinator	Anderson University	2007
John "JB" Barrett	Associate director, Athletic trainer	Mississippi State University	1997
Lani McQuade	Executive assistant	Holy Names	1991

== Schedule and results ==
Date time, TV	Rank^{#}	Opponent^{#}	Result	Record	Site (attendance) city, state
Non-conference regular season
November 11, 2016*; 5:00 pm	No. 20	vs. South Alabama	W 85–33	1–0	Jacksonville Veterans Memorial Arena (2,003); Jacksonville, FL
November 15, 2016*; 6:30 pm	No. 19	at Chattanooga	W 72–61	2–0	McKenzie Arena (2,427); Chattanooga, TN
November 19, 2016*; 1:00 pm	No. 19	vs. Temple	W 83–76	3–0	Patriot Gym (540); Ocala, FL
November 22, 2016*; 6:30 pm	No. 16	at Arkansas State	W 71–60	4–0	Convocation Center; Jonesboro, AR
November 25, 2016*; 8:00 pm	No. 16	at Northwestern	L 68–73	4–1	Welsh-Ryan Arena (857); Evansville, IL
November 30, 2016*; 7:00 pm	No. 19	vs. Wofford	W 74–51	5–1	Patriot Gym (783); Ocala, FL
December 3, 2016*; 4:30 pm	No. 19	vs. Long Beach State; ASU Classic semifinals	W 83–53	6–1	Wells Fargo Arena (1,428); Tempe, AZ
December 4, 2016*; 4:00 pm	No. 19	at Arizona State; ASU Classic championship	L 63–69	6–2	Wells Fargo Arena (1,773); Tempe, AZ
December 8, 2016*; 6:00 pm, ACCN Extra	No. 23	at No. 7 Florida State	L 58–83	6–3	Donald L. Tucker Center (3,390); Tallahassee, FL
December 11, 2016*; 3:00 pm	No. 23	vs. North Carolina A&T	W 67–38	7–3	Billy Harrison Field House (720); Panama City, FL
December 20, 2016*; 7:45 pm		vs. Indiana; Florida Sunshine Classic	L 88–102	7–4	Worden Arena (829); Winter Haven, FL
December 21, 2016*; 5:30 pm		vs. Florida A&M; Florida Sunshine Classic	W 78–65	8–4	Worden Arena (618); Winter Haven, FL
December 28, 2016*; 7:00 pm		Southeastern Louisiana	W 102–51	9–4	O'Connell Center (1,619); Gainesville, FL
SEC regular season
January 1, 2017; 2:00 pm		Auburn	L 75–82	9–5 (0–1)	O'Connell Center (1,720); Gainesville, FL
January 5, 2017; 8:00 pm		at LSU	L 67–78	9–6 (0–2)	Maravich Center (1,802); Baton Rouge, LA
January 8, 2017; 12:00 pm, ESPNU		No. 5 South Carolina	L 62–81	9–7 (0–3)	O'Connell Center (2,232); Gainesville, FL
January 12, 2017; 9:00 pm, SECN		at No. 4 Mississippi State	L 49–82	9–8 (0–4)	Humphrey Coliseum (5,575); Starkville, MS
January 15, 2017; 1:00 pm, SECN		Texas A&M	L 59–67	9–9 (0–5)	O'Connell Center (2,133); Gainesville, FL
January 22, 2017; 1:00 pm, SECN		at Georgia	W 76–68	10–9 (1–5)	Stegeman Coliseum (4,181); Athens, GA
January 26, 2017; 7:00 pm		Tennessee	L 75–84	10–10 (1–6)	O'Connell Center (2,059); Gainesville, FL
January 29, 2017; 3:00 pm		at Vanderbilt	W 93–73	11–10 (2–6)	Memorial Gymnasium (4,336); Nashville, TN
February 2, 2017; 8:00 pm, SECN		at Texas A&M	L 76–84	11–11 (2–7)	Humphrey Coliseum (3,206); College Station, TX
February 6, 2017; 7:00 pm, SECN		Ole Miss	L 75–84	11–12 (2–8)	O'Connell Center (1,219); Gainesville, FL
February 9, 2017; 7:00 pm		Arkansas	W 57–53	12–12 (3–8)	O'Connell Center (1,441); Gainesville, FL
February 12, 2017; 1:00 pm, SECN		at Alabama	W 66–56	13–12 (4–8)	Coleman Coliseum (1,721); Tuscaloosa, AL
February 16, 2017; 7:00 pm		Missouri	L 67–74	13–13 (4–9)	O'Connell Center (1,571); Gainesville, FL
February 19, 2017; 1:00 pm, SECN		at Kentucky	L 48–67	13–14 (4–10)	Memorial Coliseum (6,604); Lexington, KY
February 23, 2017; 7:00 pm, SECN		at Tennessee	L 70–74	13–15 (4–11)	Thompson–Boling Arena (9,968); Knoxville, TN
February 26, 2017; 1:00 pm, ESPNU		Georgia	W 65–58	14–15 (5–11)	O'Connell Center (3,809); Gainesville, FL
SEC Women's Tournament
March 1, 2017; 1:00 pm, SECN	(11)	vs. (14) Arkansas; First round	W 71–61	15–15	Bon Secours Wellness Arena (3,507); Greenville, SC
March 2, 2017; 8:30 pm, SECN	(11)	vs. (6) Texas A&M; Second round	L 48–67	15–16	Bon Secours Wellness Arena (3,568); Greenville, SC
*Non-conference game. ^{#}Rankings from AP Poll. (#) Tournament seedings in parentheses. All times are in Eastern Time.

== Rankings ==
2016–17 NCAA Division I women's basketball rankings

Regular season polls
Poll	Pre- Season	Week 2	Week 3	Week 4	Week 5	Week 6	Week 7	Week 8	Week 9	Week 10	Week 11	Week 12	Week 13	Week 14	Week 15	Week 16	Week 17	Week 18	Week 19	Final
AP	20	19	16	19	23	RV	RV	NR	NR	NR	NR	NR	NR	NR	NR	NR	NR			N/A
Coaches	24	23	20	23	25	RV	RV	NR	NR	NR	NR	NR	NR	NR	NR	NR	NR			

Legend
	Increase in ranking
	Decrease in ranking
	Not ranked previous week
(RV)	Received Votes

== See also ==
- 2016–17 Florida Gators men's basketball team
