= 2016–17 Texas A&M Aggies women's basketball team =

Intercollegiate basketball season

2016–17 Texas A&M Aggies women's basketball

NCAA tournament, second round
- Conference: Southeastern Conference
- Record: 22–12 (9–7 SEC)
- Head coach: Gary Blair (14th season)
- Assistant coaches: Kelly Bond-White; Bob Starkey; Amy Wright
- Home arena: Reed Arena

2016–17 SEC women's basketball standings
	Conf.				Overall
Team	W		L	PCT	W		L	PCT
No. 3 South Carolina†	14	–	2	.875	33	–	4	.892
No. 7 Mississippi State	13	–	3	.813	34	–	5	.872
No. 18 Kentucky	11	–	5	.688	22	–	11	.667
No. 25 Missouri	11	–	5	.688	21	–	11	.656
Tennessee	10	–	6	.625	20	–	12	.625
Texas A&M	9	–	7	.563	22	–	12	.647
LSU	8	–	8	.500	20	–	12	.625
Auburn	7	–	9	.438	17	–	15	.531
Georgia	7	–	9	.438	16	–	15	.516
Ole Miss	6	–	10	.375	17	–	14	.548
Alabama	5	–	11	.313	22	–	14	.611
Florida	5	–	11	.313	15	–	16	.484
Vanderbilt	4	–	12	.250	14	–	16	.467
Arkansas	2	–	14	.125	13	–	17	.433
† 2017 SEC tournament winner Rankings from AP poll

The 2016–17 Texas A&M Aggies women's basketball team represented Texas A&M University in the 2016–17 NCAA Division I women's basketball season. The team's head coach was Gary Blair, who was in his fourteenth season at Texas A&M. The team playsedtheir home games at the Reed Arena in College Station, Texas and played in its fifth season as a member of the Southeastern Conference. They finished the season 22–12, 9–7 in SEC play to finish in sixth place. They defeated Florida and Missouri before losing to Mississippi State in the semifinals of the SEC women's tournament. They received an at-large bid to the NCAA women's basketball tournament, where they defeated Penn in the first round after rallying from 21 points down, before losing to UCLA in the second round.

== Roster ==
2016–17 Texas A&M Aggies women's basketball team
Players
Coaches

Pos.	#	Name	Height	Year	Previous school	Hometown
C	00	Khaalia Hillsman	6 ft 5 in (1.96 m)	Jr	Whitney Young	Chicago, IL
G	1	Aahliyah Jackson	5 ft 10 in (1.78 m)	Fr	Northside	Fort Smith, AR
F	3	Taylor Cooper	6 ft 0 in (1.83 m)	RS Sr	Oral Roberts; Shawnee	Shawnee, OK
F	5	Anriel Howard	6 ft 0 in (1.83 m)	So	Westlake	Atlanta, GA
G	11	Curtyce Knox	5 ft 7 in (1.7 m)	RS Sr	Atascocita	Humble, TX
G	12	Danni Williams	5 ft 10 in (1.78 m)	So	Clovis	Clovis, NM
G	13	Chelsea Jennings	5 ft 9 in (1.75 m)	Sr	North Crowley	Fort Worth, TX
G	15	Jasmine Williams	5 ft 10 in (1.78 m)	Fr	Cy-Woods	Cypress, TX
G/F	21	Jasmine Lumpkin	6 ft 0 in (1.83 m)	RS Jr	Cabrini	Bolingbrook, IL
C	24	Walnaita Wright	6 ft 2 in (1.88 m)	Jr	Butler; Midland College	Augusta, GA
G	25	Rakell Spencer	5 ft 11 in (1.8 m)	Fr	Butler; Midland College	New Orleans, LA
F	52	Caylinne Martin	6 ft 3 in (1.91 m)	Jr	Langham Creek; McLennan CC	Houston, TX

Head coach

- Gary Blair (Texas Tech)

Assistant coach(es)

- Kelly Bond-White (Illinois)
- Bob Starkey (LSU)
- Amy Wright (Arkansas)

Legend

- (C) Team captain
- (S) Suspended
- (I) Ineligible
- (W) Walk-on
- Injured
- Current redshirt

Roster

== Rankings ==
Regular season polls
Poll	Pre- Season	Week 2	Week 3	Week 4	Week 5	Week 6	Week 7	Week 8	Week 9	Week 10	Week 11	Week 12	Week 13	Week 14	Week 15	Week 16	Week 17	Week 18	Week 19	Final
AP	RV	RV	RV	25	RV	RV	RV	RV	RV	RV	25	RV	RV	RV	23	RV	NR	RV	RV	N/A
Coaches	23	24	25	19	RV	RV	RV	RV	RV	RV	RV	RV	RV	RV	24	RV	NR	NR	NR	NR

Legend
	Increase in ranking
	Decrease in ranking
	Not ranked previous week
(RV)	Received votes

== Schedule and results ==
Date time, TV	Rank^{#}	Opponent^{#}	Result	Record	Site (attendance) city, state
Exhibition
11/05/2016*; 5:00 pm		Oklahoma City	W 75–65		Reed Arena (2,786); College Station, TX
Non-conference regular season
11/13/2016*; 6:00 pm		Central Arkansas	W 74–49	1–0	Reed Arena (3,030); College Station, TX
11/17/2016*; 7:00 pm		Texas Tech	W 98–90 ^{OT}	2–0	Reed Arena (3,085); College Station, TX
11/20/2016*; 4:00 pm		Stephen F. Austin	W 63–48	3–0	Reed Arena (3,376); College Station, TX
11/23/2016*; 6:30 pm		at Little Rock	W 55–37	4–0	Jack Stephens Center (1,633); Little Rock, AR
11/26/2016*; 6:00 pm		Abilene Christian	W 71–45	5–0	Reed Arena (3,339); College Station, TX
11/30/2016*; 11:00 am	No. 25	USC	L 62–66	5–1	Reed Arena (7,488); College Station, TX
12/05/2016*; 7:00 pm		at SMU	L 53–54	5–2	Moody Coliseum (948); Dallas, TX
12/07/2016*; 7:00 pm, FS1		at TCU	W 75–67	6–2	Schollmaier Arena (2,058); Fort Worth, TX
12/10/2016*; 2:00 pm		Texas A&M–Corpus Christi	W 84–55	7–2	Reed Arena (3,140); College Station, TX
12/17/2016*; 2:30 pm		vs. Southern	W 81–58	8–2	Campbell Center (681); Houston, TX
12/20/2016*; 12:00 pm		vs. Dayton; Florida Sunshine Classic	L 57–74	8–3	Worden Arena (319); Winter Haven, FL
12/21/2016*; 2:15 pm		vs. No. 19 Syracuse; Florida Sunshine Classic	W 105–84	9–3	Worden Arena (418); Winter Haven, FL
12/28/2016*; 7:00 pm		Prairie View A&M	W 90–62	10–3	Reed Arena (3,532); College Station, TX
Conference games
01/02/2016; 6:00 pm, SECN		Vanderbilt	W 77–72	11–3 (1–0)	Reed Arena (4,033); College Station, TX
01/05/2016; 6:00 pm		at Georgia	L 59–69	11–4 (1–1)	Stegeman Coliseum (2,222); Athens, GA
01/08/2016; 1:00 pm, SECN		at No. 24 Kentucky	W 77–68	12–4 (2–1)	Memorial Coliseum (5,669); Lexington, KY
01/12/2016; 7:00 pm		Arkansas	W 90–65	13–4 (3–1)	Reed Arena (3,796); College Station, TX
01/15/2016; 12:00 pm, SECN		at Florida	W 67–59	14–4 (4–1)	O'Connell Center (2,133); Gainesville, FL
01/19/2016; 8:00 pm, SECN	No. 25	at Missouri	L 76–78 ^{OT}	14–5 (4–2)	Mizzou Arena (3,587); Columbia, MO
01/22/2016; 4:00 pm	No. 25	LSU	W 54–52	15–5 (5–2)	Reed Arena (4,639); College Station, TX
01/29/2016; 3:00 pm, SECN		at No. 4 Mississippi State	L 61–71	15–6 (5–3)	Humphrey Coliseum (7,780); Starkville, MS
02/02/2016; 7:00 pm		Florida	W 84–76	16–6 (6–3)	Reed Arena (3,206); College Station, TX
02/05/2016; 1:00 pm, SECN		Auburn	W 66–61	17–6 (7–3)	Reed Arena (5,012); College Station, TX
02/09/2016; 7:00 pm		Alabama	W 69–48	18–6 (8–3)	Reed Arena (4,062); College Station, TX
02/12/2016; 1:00 pm, ESPNU		at No. 24 Tennessee	W 61–59	19–6 (9–3)	Thompson–Boling Arena (10,132); Knoxville, TN
02/16/2016; 7:00 pm	No. 23	at LSU	L 63–67	19–7 (9–4)	Maravich Center (1,926); Baton Rouge, LA
02/19/2016; 4:00 pm, SECN	No. 23	No. 3 Mississippi State	L 67–72	19–8 (9–5)	Reed Arena (5,243); College Station, TX
02/23/2016; 8:00 pm, SECN		No. 7 South Carolina	L 64–80	19–9 (9–6)	Reed Arena (6,402); College Station, TX
02/26/2016; 4:00 pm, SECN		at Ole Miss	L 49–62	19–10 (9–7)	The Pavilion at Ole Miss (1,704); Oxford, MS
SEC Women's Tournament
03/02/2017; 7:30 pm, SECN	(6)	vs. (11) Florida; Second Round	W 67–48	20–10	Bon Secours Wellness Arena (3,568); Greenville, SC
03/03/2017; 7:30 pm, SECN	(6)	vs. (3) No. 23 Missouri; Quarterfinals	W 62–48	21–10	Bon Secours Wellness Arena (4,330); Greenville, SC
03/04/2017; 6:30 pm, ESPNU	(6)	vs. (2) No. 6 Mississippi State; Semifinals	L 50–66	21–11	Bon Secours Wellness Arena (7,554); Greenville, SC
NCAA tournament
03/18/2017*; 8:00 pm, ESPN2	(5 B)	vs. (12 B) Penn; First Round	W 63–61	22–11	Pauley Pavilion (2,256); Los Angeles, CA
03/20/2017*; 9:00 pm, ESPNU	(5 B)	at (4 B) No. 15 UCLA; Second Round	L 43–75	22–12	Pauley Pavilion (2,077); Los Angeles, CA
*Non-conference game. ^{#}Rankings from AP Poll. (#) Tournament seedings in parentheses. B=Bridgeport Region. All times are in Central Time.

== See also ==
- 2016–17 Texas A&M Aggies men's basketball team
