= 2016–17 Ole Miss Rebels women's basketball team =

Intercollegiate basketball season

2016–17 Ole Miss Rebels women's basketball

WNIT, First Round
- Conference: Southeastern Conference
- Record: 17–14 (6–10 SEC)
- Head coach: Matt Insell (4th season)
- Assistant coaches: Alex Simmons; Brittany Hudson; George Porcha
- Home arena: The Pavilion at Ole Miss

2016–17 SEC women's basketball standings
	Conf.				Overall
Team	W		L	PCT	W		L	PCT
No. 3 South Carolina†	14	–	2	.875	33	–	4	.892
No. 7 Mississippi State	13	–	3	.813	34	–	5	.872
No. 18 Kentucky	11	–	5	.688	22	–	11	.667
No. 25 Missouri	11	–	5	.688	21	–	11	.656
Tennessee	10	–	6	.625	20	–	12	.625
Texas A&M	9	–	7	.563	22	–	12	.647
LSU	8	–	8	.500	20	–	12	.625
Auburn	7	–	9	.438	17	–	15	.531
Georgia	7	–	9	.438	16	–	15	.516
Ole Miss	6	–	10	.375	17	–	14	.548
Alabama	5	–	11	.313	22	–	14	.611
Florida	5	–	11	.313	15	–	16	.484
Vanderbilt	4	–	12	.250	14	–	16	.467
Arkansas	2	–	14	.125	13	–	17	.433
† 2017 SEC tournament winner Rankings from AP poll

The 2016–17 Ole Miss Rebels women's basketball team represented University of Mississippi during the 2016–17 NCAA Division I women's basketball season. The Rebels, led by fourth year head coach Matt Insell, played their home games at the Pavilion at Ole Miss and are members of the Southeastern Conference (SEC). They finished the season 17–14, 6–10 in SEC play to finish in tenth place. They lost in the second round of the SEC women's basketball tournament to LSU. They were invited to the Women's National Invitation Tournament where they got upset by Grambling State in the first round.

== Roster ==
2016–17 Ole Miss Rebels women's basketball team
Players
Coaches

Pos.	#	Name	Height	Year	Previous school	Hometown
G	1	Bree Glover	5 ft 10 in (1.78 m)	Fr	Glasgow HS	Glasgow, KY
G	5	Erika Sisk	5 ft 9 in (1.75 m)	Sr	Oxford HS; Murray State	Oxford, MS
F/C	10	Cecilia Muhate Pena	6 ft 2 in (1.88 m)	So	Arturo Soria	Madrid, Spain
F	11	Shequila Joseph	6 ft 3 in (1.91 m)	Sr	Barking Abbey School	London, England
G	20	Madinah Muhammad	5 ft 8 in (1.73 m)	So	Whitney Young HS	Chicago, IL
G	21	Chrishae Roe	5 ft 10 in (1.78 m)	RS Jr	Santiago HS; Kentucky	Riverside, CA
G	23	Shandricka Sessom	5 ft 10 in (1.78 m)	Jr	Byhalia HS	Byhalia, MS
F	24	Bretta Hart	6 ft 1 in (1.85 m)	Sr	Bay HS	Poplarville, MS
G	25	Alissa Alston	5 ft 8 in (1.73 m)	So	Upper Room Christian Academy	New Haven, CT
F	32	Katie Rogers	6 ft 2 in (1.88 m)	Fr	Wenonah HS	Birmingham, AL
F/C	42	Shelby Gibson	6 ft 3 in (1.91 m)	Fr	Oakland HS	Murfreesboro, TN
G	44	Torri Lewis	5 ft 11 in (1.8 m)	So	Homeschool	Olive Branch, MS
F	50	Taylor Manuel	6 ft 4 in (1.93 m)	RS Sr	Incarnate Word Academy; Loyola	St. Louis, MO

Head coach

- Matt Insell (Middle Tennessee)

Assistant coach(es)

- Alex Simmons (Tennessee)
- Brittany Hudson (Georgia State)
- George Porcha (New Haven)

Legend

- (C) Team captain
- (S) Suspended
- (I) Ineligible
- (W) Walk-on
- Injured
- Current redshirt

Roster

== Schedule ==
Date time, TV	Rank^{#}	Opponent^{#}	Result	Record	Site (attendance) city, state
Exhibition
11/04/2016*; 7:00 pm		Mississippi College	W 93–40		The Pavilion at Ole Miss; Oxford, MS
Non-conference regular season
11/11/2016*; 2:30 pm		Southeastern Louisiana	W 81–31	1–0	The Pavilion at Ole Miss (909); Oxford, MS
11/13/2016*; 5:00 pm		Lipscomb	W 76–49	2–0	The Pavilion at Ole Miss (770); Oxford, MS
11/17/2016*; 6:00 pm		Jacksonville State	W 68–50	3–0	The Pavilion at Ole Miss (876); Oxford, MS
11/20/2016*; 2:00 pm		High Point	W 73–62	4–0	The Pavilion at Ole Miss (1,127); Oxford, MS
11/26/2016*; 4:30 pm		vs. Wisconsin; Lady Rebel Round-Up semifinals	W 69–44	5–0	Cox Pavilion (931); Paradise, NV
11/27/2016*; 4:30 pm		at UNLV; Lady Rebel Round-Up championship	L 57–64	5–1	Cox Pavilion (841); Paradise, NV
12/01/2016*; 11:00 am		Jackson State	W 89–41	6–1	The Pavilion at Ole Miss (8,088); Oxford, MS
12/04/2016*; 3:00 pm		at No. 16 West Virginia; Big 12/SEC Women's Challenge	L 61–66	6–2	WVU Coliseum (2,364); Morgantown, WV
12/10/2016*; 1:00 pm		Louisiana–Monroe	W 97–40	7–2	The Pavilion at Ole Miss (1,001); Oxford, MS
12/14/2016*; 6:00 pm		No. 25 Oregon	W 83–67	8–2	The Pavilion at Ole Miss (1,079); Oxford, MS
12/17/2016*; 1:00 pm		VCU	W 77–57	9–2	The Pavilion at Ole Miss (956); Oxford, MS
12/20/2016*; 6:00 pm		Austin Peay	W 66–38	10–2	The Pavilion at Ole Miss (1,104); Oxford, MS
12/28/2016*; 6:00 pm		Mississippi Valley State	W 67–30	11–2	The Pavilion at Ole Miss (1,151); Oxford, MS
SEC regular season
01/01/2017; 4:00 pm, SECN		Arkansas	W 73–64	12–2 (1–0)	The Pavilion at Ole Miss (1,280); Oxford, MS
01/05/2017; 7:00 pm		at Alabama	L 80–90	12–3 (1–1)	Coleman Coliseum (2,588); Tuscaloosa, AL
01/08/2017; 3:00 pm, SECN		at Auburn	L 60–83	12–4 (1–2)	Auburn Arena (2,325); Auburn, AL
01/12/2017; 6:00 pm		Tennessee	W 67–62	13–4 (2–2)	The Pavilion at Ole Miss (1,503); Oxford, MS
01/16/2017; 6:00 pm, SECN		at No. 4 Mississippi State	L 62–73	13–5 (2–3)	Humphrey Coliseum (8,840); Starkville, MS
01/19/2017; 6:00 pm, SECN		at No. 5 South Carolina	L 46–65	13–6 (2–4)	Colonial Life Arena (12,518); Columbia, SC
01/22/2017; 2:00 pm		Alabama	L 57–65	13–7 (2–5)	The Pavilion at Ole Miss (1,596); Oxford, MS
01/26/2017; 6:00 pm		at Kentucky	L 57–89	13–8 (2–6)	Memorial Coliseum (4,272); Lexington, KY
01/29/2017; 2:00 pm		Georgia	W 69–62	14–8 (3–6)	The Pavilion at Ole Miss (1,460); Oxford, MS
02/06/2017; 6:00 pm, SECN		at Florida	W 84–75	15–8 (4–6)	O'Connell Center (1,219); Gainesville, FL
02/09/2017; 6:00 pm		LSU	L 51–62	15–9 (4–7)	The Pavilion at Ole Miss (729); Oxford, MS
02/12/2017; 3:00 pm, SECN		No. 4 Mississippi State	L 44–66	15–10 (4–8)	The Pavilion at Ole Miss (4,634); Oxford, MS
02/16/2017; 8:00 pm, SECN		Auburn	W 63–59	16–10 (5–8)	The Pavilion at Ole Miss (1,046); Oxford, MS
02/19/2017; 2:00 pm		at Vanderbilt	L 67–85	16–11 (5–9)	Memorial Gymnasium (3,663); Nashville, TN
02/23/2017; 7:00 pm		at No. 24 Missouri	L 65–100	16–12 (5–10)	Mizzou Arena (15,061); Columbia, MO
02/26/2017; 7:00 pm, SECN		Texas A&M	W 62–49	17–12 (6–10)	The Pavilion at Ole Miss (1,704); Oxford, MS
SEC Women's Tournament
03/02/2017; 5:00 pm, SECN	(10)	vs. (7) LSU; Second Round	L 49–65	17–13	Bon Secours Wellness Arena; Greenville, SC
WNIT
03/16/2017*; 6:00 pm		Grambling State; First Round	L 75–78	17–14	The Pavilion at Ole Miss (850); Oxford, MS
*Non-conference game. ^{#}Rankings from AP Poll. (#) Tournament seedings in parentheses. All times are in Central Time.

== Rankings ==
Regular season polls
Poll	Pre- Season	Week 2	Week 3	Week 4	Week 5	Week 6	Week 7	Week 8	Week 9	Week 10	Week 11	Week 12	Week 13	Week 14	Week 15	Week 16	Week 17	Week 18	Week 19	Final
AP	NR	NR	NR	NR	NR	NR	RV	RV	RV	NR	NR	NR	NR	NR	NR	NR	NR			N/A
Coaches	NR	NR	NR	NR	NR	NR	NR	NR	NR	NR	NR	NR	NR	NR	NR	NR	NR			

Legend
	Increase in ranking
	Decrease in ranking
	Not ranked previous week
(RV)	Received Votes

== See also ==
2016–17 Ole Miss Rebels men's basketball team
