= 2016–17 Georgia Lady Bulldogs basketball team =

Intercollegiate basketball season

2016–17 Georgia Lady Bulldogs basketball
- Conference: Southeastern Conference
- Record: 16–15 (7–9 SEC)
- Head coach: Joni Taylor (2nd season)
- Assistant coaches: Karen Lange; Chelsea Newton; Robert Mosley
- Home arena: Stegeman Coliseum

2016–17 SEC women's basketball standings
	Conf.				Overall
Team	W		L	PCT	W		L	PCT
No. 3 South Carolina†	14	–	2	.875	33	–	4	.892
No. 7 Mississippi State	13	–	3	.813	34	–	5	.872
No. 18 Kentucky	11	–	5	.688	22	–	11	.667
No. 25 Missouri	11	–	5	.688	21	–	11	.656
Tennessee	10	–	6	.625	20	–	12	.625
Texas A&M	9	–	7	.563	22	–	12	.647
LSU	8	–	8	.500	20	–	12	.625
Auburn	7	–	9	.438	17	–	15	.531
Georgia	7	–	9	.438	16	–	15	.516
Ole Miss	6	–	10	.375	17	–	14	.548
Alabama	5	–	11	.313	22	–	14	.611
Florida	5	–	11	.313	15	–	16	.484
Vanderbilt	4	–	12	.250	14	–	16	.467
Arkansas	2	–	14	.125	13	–	17	.433
† 2017 SEC tournament winner Rankings from AP poll

The 2016–17 Georgia Lady Bulldogs women's basketball team represented the University of Georgia in the 2016–17 NCAA Division I women's basketball season. The Lady Bulldogs, led by second year head coach Joni Taylor, played their home games at Stegeman Coliseum, and were members of the Southeastern Conference. They finished the season 16–15, 7–9 in SEC play to finish in a tie for eighth place. They advanced to the quarterfinals of the SEC women's tournament where they lost to South Carolina.

== Roster ==
2016–17 Georgia Bulldogs women's basketball team
Players
Coaches

Pos.	#	Name	Height	Year	Previous school	Hometown
G	0	Taja Cole (I) (redshirt)	5 ft 7 in (1.7 m)	So	Salesian; Louisville	Richmond, Virginia
G	1	Shanea Armbrister	6 ft 2 in (1.88 m)	Sr	South Broward HS; Darton College	Nassau, Bahamas
F	3	Stephanie Paul	6 ft 1 in (1.85 m)	Fr	Community School of Naples	Naples, FL
F	4	Caliya Robinson	6 ft 3 in (1.91 m)	So	McEachern HS	Marietta, GA
G/F	11	Pachis Roberts	5 ft 11 in (1.8 m)	RS Sr	McEachern HS; Syracuse	Powder Springs, Ga
G	12	Haley Clark	5 ft 9 in (1.75 m)	Jr	Edgewater HS	Orlando, FL
F	23	Halle Washington	6 ft 2 in (1.88 m)	Jr	Parkway HS	Bossier City, LA
G	24	Simone Costa	5 ft 10 in (1.78 m)	Jr	XXXX; Independence CC	Lisbon, Portugal
F	30	Kortney Eisenman	6 ft 3 in (1.91 m)	Fr	Upper Arlington HS	Columbus, OH
F	33	Mackenzie Engram	6 ft 2 in (1.88 m)	Jr	Hillgrove HS	Powder Springs, GA
F	51	Bianca Blanaru (I) (redshirt)	6 ft 5 in (1.96 m)	Jr	XXXX; Washington State	Timișoara, Romania

Head coach

- Joni Taylor (Alabama)

Assistant coach(es)

- Karen Lange (Iowa)
- Chelsea Newton (Rutgers)
- Robert Mosley (Miles)

Legend

- (C) Team captain
- (S) Suspended
- (I) Ineligible
- (W) Walk-on
- Injured
- Current redshirt

Roster

== Schedule ==
Date time, TV	Rank^{#}	Opponent^{#}	Result	Record	Site (attendance) city, state
Non-conference regular season
11/11/2016*; 7:00 pm		South Carolina State	W 64–50	1–0	Stegeman Coliseum (2,864); Athens, GA
11/13/2016*; 2:00 pm		Mercer	W 72–64	2–0	Stegeman Coliseum (2,497); Athens, GA
11/16/2016*; 7:00 pm		BYU	W 81–51	3–0	Stegeman Coliseum (2,239); Athens, GA
11/20/2016*; 2:00 pm, ACCN Extra		at Georgia Tech	L 45–52	3–1	Hank McCamish Pavilion (2,206); Athens, GA
11/24/2016*; 2:00 pm		vs. Minnesota; Junkanoo Jam Lucaya Division semifinals	W 70–58	4–1	St. George HS Gymnasium; Freeport, BAH
11/26/2016*; 5:45 pm		vs. South Florida; Junkanoo Jam Lucaya Division championship	L 65–81	4–2	St. George HS Gymnasium (543); Freeport, BAH
11/29/2016*; 7:00 pm		Kennesaw State	W 82–40	5–2	Stegeman Coliseum (2,056); Athens, GA
12/03/2016*; 8:00 pm		at Oklahoma State; Big 12/SEC Women's Challenge	L 51–71	5–3	Gallagher-Iba Arena (2,497); Stillwater, OK
12/05/2016*; 7:00 pm		Furman	W 67–62	6–3	Stegeman Coliseum (2,078); Athens, GA
12/15/2016*; 12:00 pm		at Cincinnati	W 51–48	7–3	Fifth Third Arena (569); Cincinnati, OH
12/19/2016*; 7:00 pm, SECN		Virginia	L 43–66	7–4	Stegeman Coliseum (2,631); Athens, GA
12/22/2016*; 1:00 pm		Samford	L 59–65	7–5	Stegeman Coliseum (2,509); Athens, GA
12/28/2016*; 2:00 pm		Western Carolina	W 78–43	8–5	Stegeman Coliseum (2,754); Athens, GA
SEC regular season
01/01/2017; 1:00 pm, SECN		at Missouri	L 45–63	8–6 (0–1)	Mizzou Arena (3,879); Columbia, MO
01/05/2017; 7:00 pm		Texas A&M	W 69–59	9–6 (1–1)	Stegeman Coliseum (2,222); Athens, GA
01/08/2017; 12:00 pm, SECN		Vanderbilt	W 70–68	10–6 (2–1)	Stegeman Coliseum (2,958); Athens, GA
01/12/2017; 7:00 pm, SECN		at No. 5 South Carolina	L 63–66	10–7 (2–2)	Colonial Life Arena (12,043); Columbia, SC
01/15/2017; 3:00 pm, SECN		at Kentucky	L 61–82	10–8 (2–3)	Memorial Coliseum (5,608); Lexington, KY
01/22/2017; 1:00 pm, SECN		Florida	L 68–76	10–9 (2–4)	Stegeman Coliseum (4,181); Athens, GA
01/26/2017; 7:00 pm, SECN		No. 5 South Carolina	L 44–62	10–10 (2–5)	Stegeman Coliseum (3,540); Athens, GA
01/29/2017; 3:00 pm		at Ole Miss	L 62–69	10–11 (2–6)	The Pavilion at Ole Miss (1,460); Oxford, MS
02/02/2017; 8:00 pm		at Arkansas	W 69–66	11–11 (3–6)	Bud Walton Arena (1,603); Fayetteville, AR
02/05/2017; 4:00 pm, ESPN		Tennessee	W 81–78	12–11 (4–6)	Stegeman Coliseum (3,885); Athens, GA
02/09/2017; 7:00 pm		Kentucky	L 56–66	12–12 (4–7)	Stegeman Coliseum (3,235); Athens, GA
02/12/2017; 3:00 pm		at Auburn	W 57–51	13–12 (5–7)	Auburn Arena (3,464); Auburn, AL
02/16/2017; 8:00 pm		at No. 3 Mississippi State	L 49–58	13–13 (5–8)	Humphrey Coliseum (5,431); Starkville, MS
02/19/2017; 2:00 pm		LSU	W 70–65 ^{OT}	14–13 (6–8)	Stegeman Coliseum (4,516); Athens, GA
02/23/2017; 7:00 pm		Alabama	W 71–65 ^{OT}	15–13 (7–8)	Stegeman Coliseum (2,787); Athens, GA
02/26/2017; 1:00 pm, ESPNU		at Florida	L 58-65	15–14 (7–9)	O'Connell Center (3,809); Gainesville, FL
SEC Women's Tournament
03/02/2017; 12:00 pm, SECN	(8)	vs. (9) Auburn; Second Round	W 56–52	16–14	Bon Secours Wellness Arena; Greenville, SC
03/03/2017; 12:00 pm, SECN	(8)	vs. (1) No. 5 South Carolina; Quarterfinals	L 48–72	16–15	Bon Secours Wellness Arena; Greenville, SC
*Non-conference game. ^{#}Rankings from AP Poll. (#) Tournament seedings in parentheses. All times are in Eastern Time.

== Rankings ==
2016–17 NCAA Division I women's basketball rankings

Regular season polls
Poll	Pre- Season	Week 2	Week 3	Week 4	Week 5	Week 6	Week 7	Week 8	Week 9	Week 10	Week 11	Week 12	Week 13	Week 14	Week 15	Week 16	Week 17	Week 18	Week 19	Final
AP	NR	NR	NR	NR	NR	NR	NR	NR	NR	NR	NR	NR	NR	NR	NR	NR	NR			N/A
Coaches	RV	RV	NR	NR	NR	NR	NR	NR	NR	NR	NR	NR	NR	NR	NR	NR	NR			

Legend
	Increase in ranking
	Decrease in ranking
	Not ranked previous week
(RV)	Received Votes

== See also ==
- 2016–17 Georgia Bulldogs basketball team
