= 2016–17 Tennessee Lady Volunteers basketball team =

Intercollegiate basketball season

2016–17 Tennessee Lady Volunteers basketball

NCAA tournament, second round
- Conference: Southeastern Conference
- Record: 20–12 (10–6 SEC)
- Head coach: Holly Warlick (5th season)
- Assistant coaches: Jolette Law; Dean Lockwood; Sharrona Reaves
- Home arena: Thompson–Boling Arena

2016–17 SEC women's basketball standings
	Conf.				Overall
Team	W		L	PCT	W		L	PCT
No. 3 South Carolina†	14	–	2	.875	33	–	4	.892
No. 7 Mississippi State	13	–	3	.813	34	–	5	.872
No. 18 Kentucky	11	–	5	.688	22	–	11	.667
No. 25 Missouri	11	–	5	.688	21	–	11	.656
Tennessee	10	–	6	.625	20	–	12	.625
Texas A&M	9	–	7	.563	22	–	12	.647
LSU	8	–	8	.500	20	–	12	.625
Auburn	7	–	9	.438	17	–	15	.531
Georgia	7	–	9	.438	16	–	15	.516
Ole Miss	6	–	10	.375	17	–	14	.548
Alabama	5	–	11	.313	22	–	14	.611
Florida	5	–	11	.313	15	–	16	.484
Vanderbilt	4	–	12	.250	14	–	16	.467
Arkansas	2	–	14	.125	13	–	17	.433
† 2017 SEC tournament winner Rankings from AP poll

The 2016–17 Tennessee Lady Volunteers basketball team represented the University of Tennessee in the 2016–17 college basketball season. The Lady Vols, led by 5th-year head coach Holly Warlick, played their games at Thompson–Boling Arena and were members of the Southeastern Conference. They finished the season 20–12, 10–6 in SEC play to finish in fifth place. They lost in the second round of the SEC women's tournament to Alabama. They received an at-large bid to the NCAA women's tournament, where they defeated Dayton in the first round before losing to Louisville in the second round.

== Roster ==
2016–17 Tennessee Lady Volunteers women's basketball team
Players
Coaches

Pos.	#	Name	Height	Year	Previous school	Hometown
G	0	Jordan Reynolds	5 ft 11 in (1.8 m)	Jr	Central Catholic HS	Portland, OR
F	4	Schaquilla Nunn	6 ft 3 in (1.91 m)	RS Sr	Fayetteville HS; Winthop	Fayetteville, GA
C	5	Kamera Harris	6 ft 3 in (1.91 m)	RS Fr	Dutchdown HS	Hampton, GA
G	10	Meme Jackson	5 ft 11 in (1.8 m)	So	Blackman HS	Murfreesboro, TN
G	11	Diamond DeShields	6 ft 1 in (1.85 m)	RS Jr	Norcross HS; North Carolina	Norcross, GA
G/F	13	Kortney Dunbar	6 ft 2 in (1.88 m)	Jr	Edwardsville HS	Edwardsville, IL
F	15	Cheridene Green	6 ft 3 in (1.91 m)	Jr	Harris Academy Beckenham 6th Form; ASA College	London, England
C	21	Mercedes Russell	6 ft 6 in (1.98 m)	RS Jr	Springfield HS	Springfield, OR
G/F	31	Jaime Nared	6 ft 2 in (1.88 m)	Jr	Westview HS	Portland, OR
G	33	Alexa Middleton	5 ft 9 in (1.75 m)	Jr	Riverdale HS	Murfreesboro, TN

Head coach

- Holly Warlick (Tennessee)

Assistant coach(es)

- Jolette Law (Iowa)
- Dean Lockwood (Army)
- Sharrona Reaves (Alabama)

Legend

- (C) Team captain
- (S) Suspended
- (I) Ineligible
- (W) Walk-on
- Injured
- Current redshirt

Roster

== Rankings ==
Regular season ranking movement Legend: ██ Increase in ranking. ██ Decrease in ranking. ██ Not ranked the previous week. RV=Received votes.
Poll	Pre- Season	Week 2	Week 3	Week 4	Week 5	Week 6	Week 7	Week 8	Week 9	Week 10	Week 11	Week 12	Week 13	Week 14	Week 15	Week 16	Week 17	Week 18	Week 19	Final
AP	13	13	17	22	RV	NR	RV	RV	RV	RV	NR	RV	RV	24	RV	RV	RV	RV	RV	N/A
Coaches	14	13	16	25	RV	RV	RV	RV	RV	RV	RV	RV	25	25	RV	RV	RV	RV	RV	RV

== Schedule and results ==
Date time, TV	Rank^{#}	Opponent^{#}	Result	Record	High points	High rebounds	High assists	Site (attendance) city, state
Exhibition
11/07/2016*; 7:00 pm	No. 13	Carson–Newman College	W 95–56		24 – DeShields	11 – Reynolds	7 – Reynolds	Thompson–Boling Arena (8,481); Knoxville, TN
Regular season
11/11/2016*; 7:00 pm	No. 13	at James Madison	W 81–69	1–0	19 – Nared	11 – Russell	5 – DeShields	JMU Convocation Center (3,471); Harrisonburg, VA
11/13/2016*; 2:00 pm	No. 13	Navy	W 85–55	2–0	21 – Middleton	10 – Russell	7 – Reynolds	Thompson–Boling Arena (8,212); Knoxville, TN
11/15/2016*; 7:00 pm, ESPN3	No. 13	at East Tennessee State	W 83–58	3–0	28 – DeShields	10 – DeShields	6 – DeShields	Freedom Hall Civic Center (6,072); Johnson City, TN
11/20/2016*; 5:00 pm, BTN	No. 13	at Penn State	L 56–70	3–1	19 – Russell	11 – Russell	5 – DeShields	Bryce Jordan Center (3,754); University Park, PA
11/27/2016*; 2:00 pm, ACCN Extra	No. 17	at Virginia Tech	L 63–67	3–2	17 – Russell	14 – Russell	10 – DeShields	Cassell Coliseum (3,159); Blacksburg, VA
11/30/2016*; 7:00 pm	No. 22	Tennessee State	W 86–36	4–2	16 – Tied	15 – Nunn	3 – DeShields	Thompson–Boling Arena (7,845); Knoxville, TN
12/04/2016*; 2:00 pm, ESPN2	No. 22	No. 4 Baylor; Big 12/SEC Women's Challenge	L 66–88	4–3	22 – Russell	12 – Russell	4 – Reynolds	Thompson–Boling Arena (9,244); Knoxville, TN
12/11/2016*; 4:30 pm, FS1		at No. 17 Texas	L 67–72	4–4	22 – Nared	7 – Reynolds	5 – Reynolds	Frank Erwin Center (4,386); Austin, TX
12/14/2016*; 7:00 pm		Appalachian State	W 86–36	5–4	16 – Tied	15 – Nunn	11 – Middleton	Thompson–Boling Arena (7,826); Knoxville, TN
12/18/2016*; 3:00 pm, SECN		No. 10 Stanford; Rivalry	W 59–51	6–4	15 – DeShields	15 – Russell	3 – Tied	Thompson–Boling Arena (9,137); Knoxville, TN
12/21/2016*; 7:00 pm		Troy	W 110–84	7–4	29 – Middleton	14 – Nared	13 – Reynolds	Thompson–Boling Arena (7,827); Knoxville, TN
12/29/2016*; 7:00 pm		UNC Wilmington	W 90–54	8–4	21 – Nared	14 – Reynolds	10 – Reynolds	Thompson–Boling Arena (9,109); Knoxville, TN
01/01/2017; 4:00 pm, ESPN2		No. 17 Kentucky; Rivalry	W 72–65	9–4 (1–0)	22 – Russell	9 – Russell	4 – Reynolds	Thompson–Boling Arena (9,709); Knoxville, TN
01/05/2017; 9:00 pm, SECN		at Vanderbilt; Rivalry	W 70–57	10–4 (2–0)	16 – DeShields	13 – Russell	4 – DeShields	Memorial Gymnasium (3,509); Nashville, TN
01/08/2017; 2:00 pm		No. 5 Mississippi State	L 64–74	10–5 (2–1)	25 – DeShields	14 – Russell	15 – Reynolds	Thompson–Boling Arena (8,553); Knoxville, TN
01/12/2017; 7:00 pm		at Ole Miss	L 62–67	10–6 (2–2)	23 – Nared	12 – DeShields	3 – DeShields	The Pavilion at Ole Miss (1,503); Oxford, MS
01/16/2017*; 7:00 pm, ESPN2		No. 6 Notre Dame	W 71–69	11–6	20 – DeShields	7 – Reynolds	4 – DeShields	Thompson–Boling Arena (10,517); Knoxville, TN
01/19/2017; 7:00 pm		at Auburn	L 61–79	11–7 (2–3)	26 – Russell	11 – Russell	8 – DeShields	Auburn Arena (2,290); Auburn, AL
01/22/2017; 5:00 pm, ESPN2		Vanderbilt; Rivalry	W 91–63	12–7 (3–3)	23 – DeShields	9 – Russell	7 – Middleton	Thompson–Boling Arena (10,106); Knoxville, TN
01/26/2017; 7:00 pm		at Florida	W 84–75	13–7 (4–3)	27 – DeShields	9 – Reynolds	5 – Reynolds	O'Connell Center (2,059); Gainesville, FL
01/30/2017; 6:00 pm, ESPN2		at No. 5 South Carolina	W 76–74	14–7 (5–3)	27 – Nared	10 – Russell	5 – DeShields	Colonial Life Arena (13,690); Columbia, SC
02/02/2017; 7:00 pm		LSU	W 77–58	15–7 (6–3)	26 – Nared	11 – DeShields	8 – DeShields	Thompson–Boling Arena (10,209); Knoxville, TN
02/05/2017; 4:00 pm, ESPN		at Georgia	L 78–81 ^{2OT}	15–8 (6–4)	34 – DeShields	17 – Russell	7 – Reynolds	Stegeman Coliseum (3,885); Athens, GA
02/09/2017; 7:00 pm, SECN	No. 24	Missouri	W 77–66	16–8 (7–4)	22 – DeShields	6 – Tied	8 – Reynolds	Thompson–Boling Arena (8,041); Knoxville, TN
02/12/2017; 2:00 pm, ESPNU	No. 24	Texas A&M	L 59–61	16–9 (7–5)	17 – Russell	11 – Russell	5 – Reynolds	Thompson–Boling Arena (10,032); Knoxville, TN
02/16/2017; 8:00 pm		at Alabama	L 57–65	16–10 (7–6)	17 – Russell	15 – Nunn	5 – Reynolds	Coleman Coliseum (2,221); Tuscaloosa, AL
02/19/2017; 3:00 pm, SECN		Arkansas	W 59–46	17–10 (8–6)	19 – Nared	10 – Russell	7 – Reynolds	Thompson–Boling Arena (10,613); Knoxville, TN
02/23/2017; 7:00 pm, SECN		Florida	W 74–70	18–10 (9–6)	17 – Russell	10 – Russell	9 – DeShields	Thompson–Boling Arena (9,968); Knoxville, TN
02/26/2017; 5:00 pm, ESPN2		at No. 3 Mississippi State	W 82–64	19–10 (10–6)	30 – Nared	9 – Nared	6 – DeShields	Humphrey Coliseum (10,500); Starkville, MS
SEC Women's Tournament
03/02/2017; 2:30 pm, SECN	(5)	vs. (12) Alabama; Second round	L 64–72	19–11	16 – Russell	12 – Russell	2 – Tied	Bon Secours Wellness Arena (3,746); Greenville, SC
NCAA Women's Tournament
03/18/2017*; 1:30 pm, ESPN2	(5 O)	vs. (12 O) Dayton; First Round	W 66–57	20–11	24 – DeShields	15 – Nunn	5 – DeShields	KFC Yum! Center (5,441); Louisville, KY
03/20/2017*; 6:45 pm, ESPN2	(5 O)	at (4 O) No. 13 Louisville; Second Round	L 64–75	20–12	28 – Nared	13 – Russell	4 – Reynolds	KFC Yum! Center (5,698); Louisville, KY
*Non-conference game. ^{#}Rankings from AP Poll. (#) Tournament seedings in parentheses. O=Oklahoma City Region. All times are in Eastern Time.

== See also ==
- 2016–17 Tennessee Volunteers basketball team
