= 2017 SEC women's basketball tournament =

- Classification: Division I
- Season: 2016–17
- Teams: 14
- Site: Bon Secours Wellness Arena; Greenville, SC
- Champions: South Carolina (3rd title)
- Winning coach: Dawn Staley (3rd title)
- MVP: A'ja Wilson (South Carolina)
- Attendance: 36,122
- Television: SEC Network, ESPN, ESPNU

2016–17 SEC women's basketball standings
	Conf.				Overall
Team	W		L	PCT	W		L	PCT
No. 3 South Carolina†	14	–	2	.875	33	–	4	.892
No. 7 Mississippi State	13	–	3	.813	34	–	5	.872
No. 18 Kentucky	11	–	5	.688	22	–	11	.667
No. 25 Missouri	11	–	5	.688	21	–	11	.656
Tennessee	10	–	6	.625	20	–	12	.625
Texas A&M	9	–	7	.563	22	–	12	.647
LSU	8	–	8	.500	20	–	12	.625
Auburn	7	–	9	.438	17	–	15	.531
Georgia	7	–	9	.438	16	–	15	.516
Ole Miss	6	–	10	.375	17	–	14	.548
Alabama	5	–	11	.313	22	–	14	.611
Florida	5	–	11	.313	15	–	16	.484
Vanderbilt	4	–	12	.250	14	–	16	.467
Arkansas	2	–	14	.125	13	–	17	.433
† 2017 SEC tournament winner Rankings from AP poll

The 2017 Southeastern Conference women's basketball tournament was a postseason women's basketball tournament for the Southeastern Conference held at Bon Secours Wellness Arena in Greenville, South Carolina, from March 1 through 5, 2017. South Carolina won their 3rd straight SEC tournament title and earned an automatic bid to the 2017 NCAA Women's Division I Basketball Tournament.

== Seeds ==
Seed	School	Conference record	Overall record	Tiebreaker
1	South Carolina^{‡†}	14–2	25–4	
2	Mississippi St.^{†}	13–3	27–3	
3	Missouri^{†}	11–5	21–9	1–1 vs. KY; 1–0 vs. SC
4	Kentucky^{†}	11–5	20–9	1–1 vs. MO; 0–1 vs. SC
5	Tennessee^{#}	10–6	19–10	
6	Texas A&M^{#}	9–7	19–10	
7	LSU^{#}	8–8	19–10	
8	Georgia^{#}	7–9	15–15	1–0 vs. Aub.
9	Auburn^{#}	7–9	17–13	0–1 vs. GA
10	Ole Miss^{#}	6–10	17–12	
11	Florida	5–11	14–15	1–0 vs. AL
12	Alabama	5–11	17–12	0–1 vs. FL
13	Vanderbilt	4–12	14–15	
14	Arkansas	2–14	13–16	
‡ – SEC regular season champions, and tournament No. 1 seed. † – Received a double-bye in the conference tournament. # – Received a single-bye in the conference tournament. Overall records include all games played in the SEC Tournament.

== Schedule ==
Game	Time*	Matchup^{#}	Television	Attendance
First round – Wednesday, March 1
1	11:00 AM	#12 Alabama vs. #13 Vanderbilt	SECN	3,507
2	1:30 PM	#11 Florida vs. #14 Arkansas	SECN	3,507
Second round – Thursday, March 2
3	12:00 PM	#8 Georgia vs. #9 Auburn	SECN	3,746
4	2:30 PM	#5 Tennessee vs. #12 Alabama	SECN	3,746
5	6:00 PM	#7 LSU vs. #10 Ole Miss	SECN	3,568
6	8:30 PM	#6 Texas A&M vs. #11 Florida	SECN	3,568
Quarterfinals – Friday, March 3
7	12:00 PM	#1 South Carolina vs. #8 Georgia	SECN	5,702
8	2:30 PM	#4 Kentucky vs. #12 Alabama	SECN	5,702
9	6:00 PM	#2 Mississippi St. vs. #7 LSU	SECN	4,330
10	8:30 PM	#3 Missouri vs. #6 Texas A&M	SECN	4,330
Semifinals – Saturday, March 4
11	5:00 PM	#1 South Carolina vs #4 Kentucky	ESPNU	7,554
12	7:30 PM	#2 Mississippi St. vs #6 Texas A&M	ESPNU	7,554
Championship – Sunday, March 5
13	2:30 PM	#1 South Carolina vs #2 Mississippi State	ESPN	7,715
*Game times in EST. # – Rankings denote tournament seed

== Bracket ==
First round Wednesday, March 1 SECN
12	Alabama	77
13	Vanderbilt	57
11	Florida	71
14	Arkansas	61

Second round Thursday, March 2 SECN
8	Georgia	56
9	Auburn	52
5	Tennessee	64
12	Alabama	72
7	LSU	65
10	Ole Miss	49
6	Texas A&M	67
11	Florida	48

Quarterfinals; Friday, March 3 SECN
1	South Carolina	72
8	Georgia	48
4	Kentucky	65
12	Alabama	55
2	Mississippi St.	78
7	LSU	61
3	Missouri	48
6	Texas A&M	62

Semifinals; Saturday, March 4 ESPNU
1	South Carolina	89
4	Kentucky	77
2	Mississippi St.	66
6	Texas A&M	50

Championship; Sunday, March 5 ESPN
1	South Carolina	59
2	Mississippi St.	49

== See also ==
- 2017 SEC men's basketball tournament
