= Joni Taylor =

American basketball coach (born 1979)

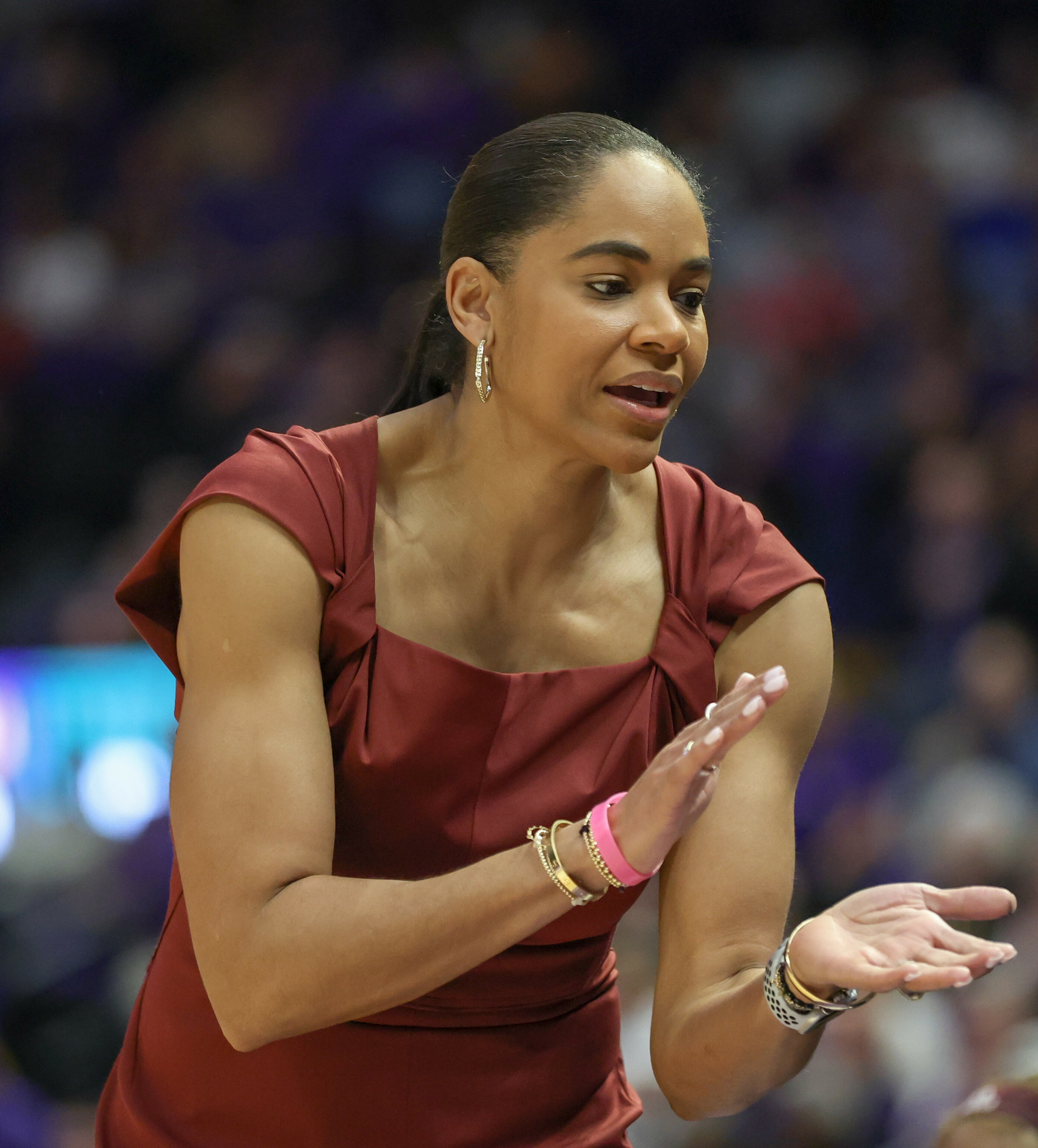
- Taylor in 2024

Current position
- Title: Head coach
- Team: Texas A&M
- Conference: SEC
- Record: 45–58 (.437)
- Annual salary: $575,000

Biographical details
- Born: March 7, 1979 (age 47); Meridian, Mississippi, U.S.

Playing career
- 1997–2001: Alabama
- Position: Power forward / center

Coaching career (HC unless noted)
- 2002–2005: Troy (asst.)
- 2005–2008: Louisiana Tech (asst./assoc. HC)
- 2008–2010: Alabama (assoc. HC)
- 2010–2011: LSU (asst.)
- 2011–2015: Georgia (asst./assoc. HC)
- 2015–2022: Georgia
- 2022–present: Texas A&M

Head coaching record
- Overall: 185–133 (.582)

Accomplishments and honors

Awards
- SEC Coach of the Year (2021)

Joni Taylor (née Crenshaw; born March 7, 1979) is an American college basketball coach who is the head women's basketball coach for Texas A&M. Prior to Texas A&M, she was head coach at Georgia from 2015 to 2022.

== Playing history ==
Born Mary Jo "Joni" Crenshaw in Meridian, Mississippi, she was the 1997 Gatorade Player of the Year for her home state, after leading Meridian High School to a 67-7 record during her junior and senior seasons. She also won three state titles in track and field. While attending the University of Alabama, she helped the Crimson Tide to the 1998 and 1999 NCAA Tournaments and the 2000 and 2001 Women's National Invitation Tournaments. She was a two-year starter and scored 716 points, grabbed 555 rebounds and blocked 103 shots, making her No. 4 among the school's career leaders. She received her bachelor's degree in education from Alabama in 2002.

== Coaching history ==
Taylor has been an assistant coach at LSU (2010–11), an associate head coach at Alabama (2008–10), an assistant then associate head coach at Louisiana Tech (2005–08), and an assistant coach at Troy (2002–05). She joined the University of Georgia staff in 2011, spending one season as an assistant coach, before being promoted to associate head coach. In April 2015, Coach Landers announced his retirement and gave full support for Taylor to replace him. She became only the second full-time head coach in program history.

Taylor coached her team to a 21–10 record in her inaugural year, including five wins against ranked opponents and an invitation to the NCAA tournament, which earned her the Spalding Maggie Dixon Rookie Coach of the Year award.

In 2021, Taylor was named SEC Coach of the Year, following a season of leading her team to the SEC tournament finals and generating interest in a top seeding in the NCAA tournament.

On March 23, 2022, Taylor was officially announced as the new head coach for Texas A&M.

== Head coaching record ==
Record table
Season	Team	Overall	Conference	Standing	Postseason
Georgia Lady Bulldogs (Southeastern Conference) (2015–2022)
2015–16	Georgia	21–10	9–7	6th	NCAA First Round
2016–17	Georgia	16–15	7–9	T-8th	
2017–18	Georgia	26–7	12–4	3rd	NCAA Second Round
2018–19	Georgia	18–12	9–7	T-6th	
2019–20	Georgia	17–14	7–9	9th	Canceled due to COVID-19
2020–21	Georgia	21–7	10–5	4th	NCAA Second Round
2021–22	Georgia	21–10	9–7	6th	NCAA Second Round
Georgia:		140–75 (.651)	63–48 (.568)		
Texas A&M Aggies (Southeastern Conference) (2022–present)
2022–23	Texas A&M	9–20	2–14	T–13th	
2023–24	Texas A&M	19–13	6–10	T–9th	NCAA First Round
2024–25	Texas A&M	10–19	3–13	T–13th	
2025-26	Texas A&M	14–13	7–9	T–10th	WBIT First Round
Texas A&M:		45–58 (.437)	11–39 (.220)		
Total:		185–133 (.582)			
National champion Postseason invitational champion Conference regular season champion Conference regular season and conference tournament champion Division regular season champion Division regular season and conference tournament champion Conference tournament champion

== Personal life ==
Taylor is married to Darius Taylor, a former women's basketball assistant coach for South Carolina. They were married in August 2015 and reside in Athens, Georgia. The Taylors have a daughter who was born in 2016, shortly before the start of the Lady Bulldogs' 2016–17 season. Their second daughter was born in 2019.

== See also ==
- List of current NCAA Division I women's basketball coaches
