= 2016–17 Stanford Cardinal women's basketball team =

Intercollegiate basketball season

2016–17 Stanford Cardinal women's basketball

Pac-12 Tournament champions Cancún Challenge Mayan Division champions

NCAA tournament, Final Four
- Conference: Pac-12 Conference

Ranking
- Coaches: No. 4
- AP: No. 6
- Record: 32–6 (15–3 Pac-12)
- Head coach: Tara VanDerveer (31st season)
- Assistant coaches: Amy Tucker; Tempie Brown; Kate Paye
- Home arena: Maples Pavilion

2016–17 Pac-12 Conference women's basketball standings
	Conf.				Overall
Team	W		L	PCT	W		L	PCT
No. 8 Oregon State	16	–	2	.889	31	–	5	.861
No. 6 Stanford †	15	–	3	.833	32	–	6	.842
No. 12 Washington	15	–	3	.833	29	–	6	.829
No. 15 UCLA	13	–	5	.722	25	–	9	.735
Arizona State	9	–	9	.500	20	–	13	.606
Oregon	8	–	10	.444	23	–	14	.622
California	6	–	12	.333	20	–	14	.588
Washington State	6	–	12	.333	16	–	20	.444
Colorado	5	–	13	.278	17	–	16	.515
Utah	5	–	13	.278	16	–	15	.516
USC	5	–	13	.278	14	–	16	.467
Arizona	5	–	13	.278	14	–	16	.467
† 2017 Pac-12 tournament winner As of March 31, 2017; Rankings from AP poll

The 2016–17 Stanford Cardinal women's basketball team represented Stanford University during the 2016–17 NCAA Division I women's basketball season. The Cardinal, led by 31st year head coach Tara VanDerveer, played their home games at the Maples Pavilion and were members of the Pac-12 Conference. They finished the season 32–6, 15–3 in Pac-12 play to finish in a tie for second place. They defeated Washington State, Oregon and Oregon State to win Pac-12 women's tournament to earn an automatic bid to the NCAA women's tournament.

Earning a No. 2 seed in the Lexington region, they defeated New Mexico State and Kansas State in the first and second rounds. In the Sweet Sixteen, they defeated Texas 77–56. In the Elite Eight, they defeated Notre Dame 76–75 to reach their 13th Final Four in school history. At the Final Four in Dallas Texas, they were defeated by South Carolina 62–53. South Carolina would go on to beat Mississippi State for the national title.

== Roster ==
2016–17 Stanford Cardinal women's basketball team
Players
Coaches

Pos.	#	Name	Height	Year	Previous school	Hometown
C	2	Shannon Coffee	6 ft 5 in (1.96 m)	So	Centerville	Dayton, OH
G	3	Anna Wilson	5 ft 9 in (1.75 m)	Fr	Bellevue	Bellevue, WA
F	4	Nadia Fingall	6 ft 3 in (1.91 m)	Fr	Choctawhatchee	Navarre, FL
F	5	Kaylee Johnson	6 ft 3 in (1.91 m)	Jr	Natrona County	Casper, WY
G	10	Briana Roberson	5 ft 7 in (1.7 m)	Sr	Troy	Fullerton, CA
F	11	Alanna Smith	6 ft 3 in (1.91 m)	So	Wesley College	Melbourne, Australia
G	12	Brittany McPhee	6 ft 0 in (1.83 m)	Jr	Mount Rainier	Normandy Park, WA
G	13	Marta Sniezek	5 ft 8 in (1.73 m)	So	National Cathedral	McLean, VA
G	14	Mikaela Brewer	5 ft 8 in (1.73 m)	Fr	Innisdale Secondary School	Barrie, ON
G	21	DiJonai Carrington	5 ft 11 in (1.8 m)	Fr	Horizon Christian Academy	San Diego, CA
G	22	Alexa Romano	5 ft 10 in (1.78 m)	So	La Cueva	Albuquerque, NM
F	24	Erica McCall	6 ft 3 in (1.91 m)	Sr	Ridgeview	Bakersfield, CA
F	32	Kailee Johnson	6 ft 3 in (1.91 m)	Sr	Central Catholic	Portland, OR
F	44	Karlie Samuelson	5 ft 11 in (1.8 m)	Sr	Mater Dei	Huntington Beach, CA

Head coach

- Tara VanDerveer (Indiana)

Assistant coach(es)

- Amy Tucker (Ohio State)
- Tempie Brown (Michigan)
- Kate Paye (Stanford)

Legend

- (C) Team captain
- (S) Suspended
- (I) Ineligible
- (W) Walk-on
- Injured
- Current redshirt

Roster

== Schedule ==
Date time, TV	Rank^{#}	Opponent^{#}	Result	Record	Site (attendance) city, state
Exhibition
11/04/2016*; 6:00 pm	No. 11	UC San Diego	W 85–41		Maples Pavilion (2,660); Stanford, CA
Non-conference regular season
11/11/2016*; 7:00 pm	No. 11	Cal Poly	W 83–55	1–0	Maples Pavilion (2,684); Stanford, CA
11/14/2016*; 5:00 pm, ESPN2	No. 11	No. 8 Texas; College Hoops Tip-Off Marathon	W 71–59	2–0	Maples Pavilion (2,447); Stanford, CA
11/18/2016*; 7:00 pm, P12N	No. 11	Gonzaga	L 63–68	2–1	Maples Pavilion (2,654); Stanford, CA
11/20/2016*; 11:30 am	No. 11	Cal State Northridge	W 88–54	3–1	Maples Pavilion (2,627); Stanford, CA
11/24/2016*; 8:00 am	No. 11	vs. Northeastern; Cancún Challenge Mayan Division	W 74–45	4–1	Hard Rock Hotel Riviera Maya (1,610); Cancún, Mexico
11/25/2016*; 8:00 am	No. 11	vs. Wichita State; Cancún Challenge Mayan Division	W 87–39	5–1	Hard Rock Hotel Riviera Maya (1,610); Cancún, Mexico
11/26/2016*; 10:30 am	No. 11	vs. Purdue; Cancún Challenge Mayan Division	W 78–69	6–1	Hard Rock Hotel Riviera Maya (1,610); Cancún, Mexico
12/01/2016*; 7:00 pm	No. 11	at Cal State Bakersfield	W 77–56	7–1	Icardo Center (1,688); Bakersfield, CA
12/04/2016*; 2:00 pm	No. 11	UC Davis	W 68–42	8–1	Maples Pavilion (2,743); Stanford, CA
12/18/2016*; 12:00 pm, SECN	No. 10	at Tennessee; Rivalry	L 51–59	8–2	Thompson–Boling Arena (9,137); Knoxville, TN
12/21/2016*; 4:00 pm	No. 14	at George Washington	W 71–52	9–2	Charles E. Smith Center (1,270); Washington, D.C.
12/28/2016*; 2:00 pm	No. 13	Yale	W 102–44	10–2	Maples Pavilion (3,564); Stanford, CA
Pac-12 regular season
12/30/2016; 3:00 pm, P12N	No. 13	at No. 18 Arizona State	W 64–57	11–2 (1–0)	Wells Fargo Arena (2,556); Tempe, AZ
01/01/2017; 1:00 pm	No. 13	at Arizona	W 77–55	12–2 (2–0)	McKale Center (1,425); Tucson, AZ
01/06/2017; 8:00 pm, P12N	No. 10	Oregon	W 81–60	13–2 (3–0)	Maples Pavilion (2,723); Stanford, CA
01/08/2017; 5:00 pm, P12N	No. 10	No. 16 Oregon State	L 69–72 ^{2OT}	13–3 (3–1)	Maples Pavilion (3,072); Stanford, CA
01/13/2017; 5:00 pm, P12N	No. 13	at Utah	W 77–58	14–3 (4–1)	Jon M. Huntsman Center (2,340); Salt Lake City, UT
01/15/2017; 1:00 pm, P12N	No. 13	at Colorado	W 84–70	15–3 (5–1)	Coors Events Center (2,126); Boulder, CO
01/20/2017; 7:00 pm	No. 10	Arizona	W 73–46	16–3 (6–1)	Maples Pavilion (3,796); Stanford, CA
01/22/2017; 3:00 pm, P12N	No. 10	No. 18 Arizona State	W 66–56	17–3 (7–1)	Maples Pavilion (3,280); Stanford, CA
01/27/2017; 8:00 pm, P12N	No. 10	at Washington State	W 76–54	18–3 (8–1)	Beasley Coliseum (626); Pullman, WA
01/29/2017; 5:00 pm, P12N	No. 10	at No. 7 Washington	W 72–68	19–3 (9–1)	Alaska Airlines Arena (10,000); Seattle, WA
02/03/2017; 6:00 pm, P12N	No. 8	USC	W 58–42	20–3 (10–1)	Maples Pavilion (4,490); Stanford, CA
02/06/2017; 6:00 pm, ESPN2	No. 8	No. 15 UCLA	L 76–85	20–4 (10–2)	Maples Pavilion (2,846); Stanford, CA
02/10/2017; 8:00 pm, P12N	No. 8	Colorado	W 64–51	21–4 (11–2)	Maples Pavilion (2,546); Stanford, CA
02/12/2017; 1:00 pm, P12N	No. 8	Utah	W 87–51	22–4 (12–2)	Maples Pavilion (3,601); Stanford, CA
02/16/2017; 8:00 pm, P12N	No. 10	at California	W 72–66	23–4 (13–2)	Haas Pavilion (4,965); Berkeley, CA
02/19/2017; 5:00 pm, P12N	No. 10	California	W 72–54	24–4 (14–2)	Maples Pavilion (4,327); Stanford, CA
02/24/2017; 8:00 pm, P12N	No. 8	at No. 10 Oregon State	L 47–50	24–5 (14–3)	Gill Coliseum (9,604); Corvallis, OR
02/26/2017; 1:00 pm, P12N	No. 8	at Oregon	W 65–59	25–5 (15–3)	Matthew Knight Arena (4,286); Eugene, OR
Pac-12 Women's Tournament
03/03/2017; 6:00 pm, P12N	(2) No. 10	vs. (7) Washington State; Quarterfinals	W 66–36	26–5	KeyArena; Seattle, WA
03/04/2017; 8:30 pm, P12N	(2) No. 10	vs. (6) Oregon; Semifinals	W 71–56	27–5	KeyArena (8,384); Seattle, WA
03/05/2017; 6:00 pm, ESPN2	(2) No. 10	vs. (1) No. 6 Oregon State; Championship Game	W 48–43	28–5	KeyArena (6,829); Seattle, WA
NCAA Women's Tournament
03/18/2017*; 10:30 am, ESPN2	(2 L) No. 6	vs. (15 L) New Mexico State; First Round	W 72–64	29–5	Bramlage Coliseum (4,005); Manhattan, KS
03/20/2017*; 3:30 pm, ESPN2	(2 L) No. 6	at (7 L) No. 24 Kansas State; Second Round	W 69–48	30–5	Bramlage Coliseum (3,969); Manhattan, KS
03/24/2017*; 6:00 pm, ESPN	(2 L) No. 6	vs. (3 L) No. 14 Texas; Sweet Sixteen	W 77–66	31–5	Rupp Arena (3,163); Lexington, KY
03/26/2017*; 9:00 am, ESPN	(2 L) No. 6	vs. (1 L) No. 2 Notre Dame; Elite Eight	W 76–75	32–5	Rupp Arena (2,527); Lexington, KY
03/31/2017*; 4:30 pm, ESPN2	(2 L) No. 6	vs. (1 S) No. 3 South Carolina; Final Four	L 53–62	32–6	American Airlines Center; Dallas, TX
*Non-conference game. ^{#}Rankings from AP Poll. (#) Tournament seedings in parentheses. L=Lexington Region. All times are in Pacific Time.

== Rankings ==
Regular season polls
Poll	Pre- Season	Week 2	Week 3	Week 4	Week 5	Week 6	Week 7	Week 8	Week 9	Week 10	Week 11	Week 12	Week 13	Week 14	Week 15	Week 16	Week 17	Week 18	Week 19	Final
AP	11	11	11т	11	10	10	14	13	10	13	10	10	8	8	10	8т	10	6	6	N/A
Coaches	10	7	11	11	10	10	14	14	10	10	12	10	9	11	10	6	9	6	6	4

Legend
	Increase in ranking
	Decrease in ranking
	Not ranked previous week
(RV)	Received Votes

== See also ==
2016–17 Stanford Cardinal men's basketball team
