= 2016–17 UCLA Bruins women's basketball team =

Women's basketball team

2016–17 UCLA Bruins women's basketball

Cancún Challenge Riviera Division champions

NCAA tournament, Sweet Sixteen
- Conference: Pac-12 Conference

Ranking
- Coaches: No. 13
- AP: No. 15
- Record: 25–9 (13–5 Pac-12)
- Head coach: Cori Close (6th season)
- Assistant coaches: Jenny Huth; Tony Newnan; Shannon Perry
- Home arena: Pauley Pavilion

2016–17 Pac-12 Conference women's basketball standings
	Conf.				Overall
Team	W		L	PCT	W		L	PCT
No. 8 Oregon State	16	–	2	.889	31	–	5	.861
No. 6 Stanford †	15	–	3	.833	32	–	6	.842
No. 12 Washington	15	–	3	.833	29	–	6	.829
No. 15 UCLA	13	–	5	.722	25	–	9	.735
Arizona State	9	–	9	.500	20	–	13	.606
Oregon	8	–	10	.444	23	–	14	.622
California	6	–	12	.333	20	–	14	.588
Washington State	6	–	12	.333	16	–	20	.444
Colorado	5	–	13	.278	17	–	16	.515
Utah	5	–	13	.278	16	–	15	.516
USC	5	–	13	.278	14	–	16	.467
Arizona	5	–	13	.278	14	–	16	.467
† 2017 Pac-12 tournament winner As of March 31, 2017; Rankings from AP poll

The 2016–17 UCLA Bruins women's basketball team represented the University of California, Los Angeles during the 2016–17 NCAA Division I women's basketball season. The Bruins, led by sixth year head coach Cori Close, play their home games at the Pauley Pavilion and were members of the Pac-12 Conference. They finished the season 25–9, 13–5 in Pac-12 play to finish in fourth place. They advanced to the semifinals of the Pac-12 women's tournament where they lost to Oregon State. They received an at-large bid to the NCAA women's tournament where they defeated Boise State and Texas A&M in the first and second rounds before losing to UConn in the Sweet Sixteen.

== Offseason ==
=== Departures ===
Name	Pos.	Height	Year	Hometown	Reason for departure
Nirra Fields	G	5'9"	Sr.	Montreal, Quebec	Graduated; selected 32nd overall by the Phoenix Mercury in the 2016 WNBA draft
Kacey Swain	F	6'3"	RS Sr.	Los Angeles, California	Graduated

=== Incoming transfers ===
Name	Pos.	Height	Year	Hometown	Previous school	Notes
Japreece Dean	Guard	5'6"	So	Austin, TX	Texas Tech	Transferred to UCLA at the semester break during the 2016-17 season and will sit out until the semester break of the 2017-18 season.

=== 2016 recruiting class ===
College recruiting information
Name	Hometown	School	Height	Weight	Commit date
Lindsey Corsaro; G	Indianapolis, IN	Roncalli	6 ft 0 in (1.83 m)	N/A	
Lindsey Corsaro; G	Recruit ratings: ESPN: (97)				
Ally Rosenblum; P	Newport Coast, CA	Mater Dei	6 ft 3 in (1.91 m)	N/A	
Ally Rosenblum; P	Recruit ratings: ESPN: (95)				
Overall recruit ranking:
Note: In many cases, Scout, Rivals, 247Sports, On3, and ESPN may conflict in their listings of height and weight.; In these cases, the average was taken. ESPN grades are on a 100-point scale.; Sources:

== Roster ==
2016–17 UCLA Bruins women's basketball team
Players
Coaches

Pos.	#	Name	Height	Year	Previous school	Hometown
G	1	Nicole Kornet	6 ft 1 in (1.85 m)	RS Sr	Liberty Christian; Oklahoma	Lantana, TX
G	2	Kari Korver	5 ft 9 in (1.75 m)	RS Sr	Valley Christian	Paramount, CA
G	3	Jordin Canada	5 ft 6 in (1.68 m)	Jr	Windward	Los Angeles, CA
F	4	Ashley Hearn	6 ft 4 in (1.93 m)	So	Sachse	Rowlett, TX
G	5	Lindsey Corsaro (injured) (redshirt)	6 ft 1 in (1.85 m)	Fr	Roncalli	Indianapolis, IN
F	10	Ally Rosenblum	6 ft 4 in (1.93 m)	Fr	Mater Dei	Newport Coast, CA
F	11	Lajahna Drummer (injured) (redshirt)	6 ft 1 in (1.85 m)	Jr	Long Beach Poly HS	Inglewood, CA
G	20	Dominique Williams	5 ft 8 in (1.73 m)	RS Jr	Saint Mary's	Phoenix, AZ
G	22	Kennedy Burke	6 ft 1 in (1.85 m)	So	Sierra Canyon School	Northridge, CA
G	23	Kelli Hayes	6 ft 0 in (1.83 m)	Jr	Archbishop Mitty	San Jose, CA
F	24	Paulina Hersler	6 ft 3 in (1.91 m)	RS Jr	Igelstavikens Gymnasium	Malmö, Sweden
F	25	Monique Billings	6 ft 4 in (1.93 m)	Jr	Santiago	Corona, CA
G	32	Chrissy Baird (injured) (redshirt)	6 ft 1 in (1.85 m)	Jr	Wheaton North	Wheaton, IL
G		Japreece Dean (I)	5 ft 6 in (1.68 m)	So	Vista Ridge; Texas Tech	Austin, TX

Head coach

- Cori Close (UC Santa Barbara)

Assistant coach(es)

- Shannon Perry (Iowa)
- Jenny Huth (Colorado)
- Tony Newnan (UC Santa Barbara)

Legend

- (C) Team captain
- (S) Suspended
- (I) Ineligible
- (W) Walk-on
- Injured
- Current redshirt

Roster

== Rankings ==
Ranking movement Legend: ██ Increase in ranking. ██ Decrease in ranking. NR = Not ranked. RV = Received votes.
Poll	Pre	Wk 2	Wk 3	Wk 4	Wk 5	Wk 6	Wk 7	Wk 8	Wk 9	Wk 10	Wk 11	Wk 12	Wk 13	Wk 14	Wk 15	Wk 16	Wk 17	Wk 18	Wk 19	Final
AP	9	9	9	10	9	9	10	10	9	17	13	13	13	15	18	15	15	15	15	N/A
Coaches	9	11	10	9	9	9	10	10	7	13	11	13	12	12	16	15	15	14	14	13

== Schedule ==
Date time, TV	Rank^{#}	Opponent^{#}	Result	Record	Site (attendance) city, state
Exhibition
11/03/2016*; 7:00 pm	No. 9	Westmont	W 80–45		Pauley Pavilion; Los Angeles, CA
Non-conference regular season
11/11/2016*; 8:30 pm	No. 9	Pacific	W 82–55	1–0	Pauley Pavilion (9,160); Los Angeles, CA
11/14/2016*; 4:00 pm, FSSW+	No. 9	at No. 2 Baylor	L 70–84	1–1	Ferrell Center (5,955); Waco, TX
11/18/2016*; 7:00 pm	No. 9	Southern	W 95–47	2–1	Pauley Pavilion (765); Los Angeles, CA
11/20/2016*; 1:00 pm	No. 9	Cal Poly	W 80–64	3–1	Pauley Pavilion (1,218); Los Angeles, CA
11/24/2016*; 6:00 pm	No. 9	vs. Iowa; Cancún Challenge Riviera Division	W 78–65	4–1	Hard Rock Hotel Riviera Maya (1,610); Cancún, Mexico
11/25/2016*; 3:30 pm	No. 9	vs. Toledo; Cancún Challenge Riviera Division	W 75–73	5–1	Hard Rock Hotel Riviera Maya (1,610); Cancún, Mexico
12/04/2016*; 2:00 pm, P12N	No. 10	Hawaii	W 72–49	6–1	Pauley Pavilion (1,454); Los Angeles, CA
12/11/2016*; 11:00 am, P12N	No. 9	Michigan	W 84–64	7–1	Pauley Pavilion (1,688); Los Angeles, CA
12/14/2016*; 7:00 pm	No. 9	at UC Santa Barbara	W 71–52	8–1	The Thunderdome (952); Santa Barbara, CA
12/18/2016*; 11:00 am, ESPN2	No. 9	at No. 6 South Carolina	L 57–66	8–2	Colonial Life Arena (13,367); Columbia, SC
12/20/2016*; 9:00 am	No. 10	at North Carolina A&T	W 83–42	9–2	Corbett Sports Center (1,241); Greensboro, NC
Pac-12 regular season
12/30/2016; 7:00 pm	No. 10	Utah	W 67–56	10–2 (1–0)	Pauley Pavilion (1,186); Los Angeles, CA
01/01/2017; 2:00 pm	No. 10	No. 20 Colorado	W 87–74	11–2 (2–0)	Pauley Pavilion (1,354); Los Angeles, CA
01/06/2017; 6:00 pm, P12N	No. 9	at Washington State	L 73–82	11–3 (2–1)	Beasley Coliseum (820); Pullman, WA
01/08/2017; 2:00 pm, ESPN2	No. 9	at No. 12 Washington	L 70–82	11–4 (2–2)	Alaska Airlines Arena (4,446); Seattle, WA
01/13/2017; 6:00 pm, P12N	No. 17	No. 10 Oregon State	W 66–56	12–4 (3–2)	Pauley Pavilion (1,403); Los Angeles, CA
01/15/2017; 1:00 pm, P12N	No. 17	Oregon	W 79–63	13–4 (4–2)	Pauley Pavilion (2,074); Los Angeles, CA
01/18/2017; 8:00 pm, P12N	No. 11	at USC; Rivalry	W 74–59	14–4 (5–2)	Galen Center (949); Los Angeles, CA
01/22/2017; 5:00 pm, P12N	No. 11	USC; Rivalry	W 71–67	15–4 (6–2)	Pauley Pavilion (4,415); Los Angeles, CA
01/27/2017; 8:00 pm, P12N	No. 13	No. 16 Arizona State	W 69–60	16–4 (7–2)	Pauley Pavilion (1,493); Los Angeles, CA
01/29/2017; 2:00 pm	No. 13	Arizona	W 69–49	17–4 (8–2)	Pauley Pavilion (2,013); Los Angeles, CA
02/03/2017; 8:00 pm, P12N	No. 13	at California	L 77–80	17–5 (8–3)	Haas Pavilion (2,461); Berkeley, CA
02/06/2017; 6:00 pm, ESPN2	No. 15	at No. 8 Stanford	W 85–76	18–5 (9–3)	Maples Pavilion (2,846); Stanford, CA
02/10/2017; 6:00 pm, P12N	No. 15	at Oregon	L 75–84	18–6 (9–4)	Matthew Knight Arena (2,438); Eugene, OR
02/12/2017; 1:00 pm, P12N	No. 15	at No. 9 Oregon State	L 61–68	18–7 (9–5)	Gill Coliseum (4,980); Corvallis, OR
02/17/2017; 8:00 pm, P12N	No. 18	No. 9 Washington	W 90–79	19–7 (10–5)	Pauley Pavilion (1,699); Los Angeles, CA
02/19/2017; 11:00 am, P12N	No. 18	Washington State	W 67–48	20–7 (11–5)	Pauley Pavilion (1,958); Los Angeles, CA
02/24/2017; 5:00 pm, P12N	No. 15	at Arizona	W 79–56	21–7 (12–5)	McKale Center (1,652); Tucson, AZ
02/26/2017; 11:00 am, P12N	No. 15	at Arizona State	W 55–52	22–7 (13–5)	Wells Fargo Arena (2,136); Tempe, AZ
Pac-12 Women's Tournament
03/03/2017; 2:00 pm, P12N	(4) No. 15	vs. (5) Arizona State; Quarterfinals	W 77–68	23–7	KeyArena (4,659); Seattle, WA
03/04/2017; 6:00 pm, P12N	(4) No. 15	vs. (1) No. 6 Oregon State; Semifinals	L 53–63	23–8	KeyArena; Seattle, WA
NCAA Women's Tournament
03/18/2017*; 3:30 pm, ESPN2	(4 B) No. 15	(13 B) Boise State; First Round	W 83–56	24–8	Pauley Pavilion (2,256); Los Angeles, CA
03/20/2017*; 7:00 pm, ESPNU	(4 B) No. 15	(5 B) Texas A&M; Second Round	W 75–43	25–8	Pauley Pavilion (2,077); Los Angeles, CA
03/25/2017*; 10:30 am, ESPN	(4 B) No. 15	vs. (1 B) No. 1 Connecticut; Sweet Sixteen	L 71–86	25–9	Webster Bank Arena (8,830); Bridgeport, CT
*Non-conference game. ^{#}Rankings from AP Poll. (#) Tournament seedings in parentheses. B=Bridgeport Region. All times are in Pacific Time.

== Honors ==
- Nov. 21 – Jordin Canada named Pac-12 Conference Player-of-the-week

== See also ==
- 2016–17 UCLA Bruins men's basketball team
