= 2016–17 California Golden Bears women's basketball team =

Intercollegiate basketball season

2016–17 California Golden Bears women's basketball

Cal Classic champions

NCAA women's tournament, second round
- Conference: Pac-12 Conference
- Record: 20–14 (6–12 Pac-12)
- Head coach: Lindsay Gottlieb (6th season)
- Assistant coaches: Charmin Smith; Kai Felton; Wendale Farrow
- Home arena: Haas Pavilion

2016–17 Pac-12 Conference women's basketball standings
| | Conf. | | | | Overall |
| Team | W | | L | PCT | W | | L | PCT |
|---|---|---|---|---|---|---|---|---|
| No. 8 Oregon State | 16 | – | 2 | .889 | 31 | – | 5 | .861 |
| No. 6 Stanford † | 15 | – | 3 | .833 | 32 | – | 6 | .842 |
| No. 12 Washington | 15 | – | 3 | .833 | 29 | – | 6 | .829 |
| No. 15 UCLA | 13 | – | 5 | .722 | 25 | – | 9 | .735 |
| Arizona State | 9 | – | 9 | .500 | 20 | – | 13 | .606 |
| Oregon | 8 | – | 10 | .444 | 23 | – | 14 | .622 |
| California | 6 | – | 12 | .333 | 20 | – | 14 | .588 |
| Washington State | 6 | – | 12 | .333 | 16 | – | 20 | .444 |
| Colorado | 5 | – | 13 | .278 | 17 | – | 16 | .515 |
| Utah | 5 | – | 13 | .278 | 16 | – | 15 | .516 |
| USC | 5 | – | 13 | .278 | 14 | – | 16 | .467 |
| Arizona | 5 | – | 13 | .278 | 14 | – | 16 | .467 |
† 2017 Pac-12 tournament winner As of March 31, 2017; Rankings from AP poll

The 2016–17 California Golden Bears women's basketball team represented University of California, Berkeley during the 2016–17 NCAA Division I women's basketball season. The Golden Bears, led by sixth-year head coach Lindsay Gottlieb, played their home games at the Haas Pavilion and were members of the Pac-12 Conference. They finished the season 20–14, 6–12 in Pac-12 play, to finish in a tie for seventh place. They advanced to the quarterfinals of the Pac-12 women's tournament where they lost to Oregon State. They received at-large bid to the NCAA women's tournament, where they defeated LSU in the first round before getting blown out by Baylor in the second round.

== Roster ==
2016–17 California Golden Bears women's basketball team
Players
Coaches

| Pos. | # | Name | Height | Year | Previous school | Hometown |
|---|---|---|---|---|---|---|
| G | 1 | Asha Thomas | 5 ft 4 in (1.63 m) | So | Bishop O'Dowd | Oakland, CA |
| F | 3 | Mikayla Cowling | 6 ft 2 in (1.88 m) | Jr | Saint Mary's College (HS) | Benicia, CA |
| C | 5 | Chen Yue | 6 ft 7 in (2.01 m) | So | Tsinghua University | Beijing, China |
| G | 11 | Sara Anastasieska (redshirt) | 5 ft 11 in (1.8 m) | So | Monte Sant'Angelo Mercy; UTSA | Sydney, Australia |
| F | 12 | Penina Davidson | 6 ft 3 in (1.91 m) | Jr | Rangitoto College | Auckland, New Zealand |
| F | 20 | MeAne Mosley | 5 ft 11 in (1.8 m) | So | Saint Mary's College HS | Oakland, CA |
| G | 21 | Mi'Cole Cayton | 5 ft 9 in (1.75 m) | So | Saint Mary's College HS | Stockton, CA |
| F | 24 | Courtney Range | 5 ft 3 in (1.6 m) | Sr | Manteca | Manteca, CA |
| F | 30 | Celeste West | 6 ft 4 in (1.93 m) | Fr | Garces Memorial | Bakersfield, CA |
| F | 31 | Kristine Anigwe | 6 ft 4 in (1.93 m) | So | Desert Vista | Phoenix, AZ |
| G | 33 | Jaelyn Brown | 6 ft 1 in (1.85 m) | Fr | Vista Murrieta | Murrieta, CA |
| F | 44 | KC Waters | 6 ft 2 in (1.88 m) | Jr | Bishop O'Dowd | San Ramon, CA |

Head coach

- Lindsay Gottlieb (Brown)

Assistant coach(es)

- Charmin Smith (Stanford)
- Kai Felton (Randolph–Macon)
- Wendale Farrow (Eastern Michigan)

Legend

- (C) Team captain
- (S) Suspended
- (I) Ineligible
- (W) Walk-on
- Injured
- Current redshirt

Roster
Last update: August 16, 2024

== Schedule ==
| Date time, TV | Rank^{#} | Opponent^{#} | Result | Record | Site (attendance) city, state |
Exhibition
| November 6, 2016*; 2:00 p.m. | | Westmont | W 87–48 | | Haas Pavilion (457); Berkeley, CA |
Non-conference regular season
| November 11, 2016*; 5:30 p.m. | | at Saint Mary's | W 74–67 | 1–0 | McKeon Pavilion (1,248); Moraga, CA |
| November 14, 2016*; 7:00 p.m. | | Santa Clara | W 73–58 | 2–0 | Haas Pavilion (1,816); Berkeley, CA |
| November 18, 2016*; 11:30 a.m. | | UC Riverside | W 71–56 | 3–0 | Haas Pavilion (4,223); Berkeley, CA |
| November 20, 2016*; 2:00 p.m. | | Cal State Bakersfield | W 86–63 | 4–0 | Haas Pavilion (2,253); Berkeley, CA |
| November 25, 2016*; 1:00 p.m. | | San Francisco; Cal Classic semifinals | W 75–52 | 5–0 | Haas Pavilion (2,637); Berkeley, CA |
| November 26, 2016*; 3:15 p.m. | | Duquesne; Cal Classic championship game | W 88–66 | 6–0 | Haas Pavilion (1,358); Berkeley, CA |
| December 4, 2016*; 1:00 p.m., BTN | | at Nebraska | W 86–65 | 7–0 | Pinnacle Bank Arena (5,573); Lincoln, NE |
| December 8, 2016*; 7:00 p.m. | | Sacramento State | W 97–73 | 8–0 | Haas Pavilion (1,484); Berkeley, CA |
| December 11, 2016*; 2:00 p.m. | | Lehigh | W 96–63 | 9–0 | Haas Pavilion (1,561); Berkeley, CA |
| December 19, 2016*; 4:30 p.m. | | vs. Southern Miss; Puerto Rico Classic | W 71–51 | 10–0 | South Point Arena; Enterprise, NV |
| December 20, 2016*; 6:45 p.m. | | vs. No. 20 Oklahoma; Puerto Rico Classic | W 82–74 | 11–0 | South Point Arena (185); Enterprise, NV |
| December 21, 2016*; 9:15 p.m. | | vs. Arkansas State; Puerto Rico Classic | W 80–55 | 12–0 | South Point Arena (95); Enterprise, NV |
Pac-12 regular season
| December 29, 2016; 6:00 p.m. | No. 21 | at Arizona | W 74–64 | 13–0 (1–0) | McKale Center (1,274); Tucson, AZ |
| January 1, 2017; 2:00 p.m., P12N | No. 21 | at No. 18 Arizona State | L 62–72 ^{2OT} | 13–1 (1–1) | Wells Fargo Arena (1,682); Tempe, AZ |
| January 6, 2017; 6:00 p.m., P12N | No. 20 | No. 16 Oregon State | L 56–66 | 13–2 (1–2) | Haas Pavilion (2,021); Berkeley, CA |
| January 8, 2017; 1:00 p.m., P12N | No. 20 | Oregon | L 66–69 | 13–3 (1–3) | Haas Pavilion (4,273); Berkeley, CA |
| January 13, 2017; 7:00 p.m. | No. 24 | at Colorado | W 65–53 | 14–3 (2–3) | Coors Events Center (1,571); Boulder, CO |
| January 15, 2017; 11:00 a.m., P12N | No. 24 | at Utah | L 57–63 | 14–4 (2–4) | Jon M. Huntsman Center (1,250); Salt Lake City, UT |
| January 20, 2017; 8:00 p.m., P12N | | No. 18 Arizona State | L 45–54 | 14–5 (2–5) | Haas Pavilion (1,622); Berkeley, CA |
| January 22, 2017; 1:00 p.m., P12N | | Arizona | W 71–60 | 15–5 (3–5) | Haas Pavilion (2,649); Berkeley, CA |
| January 27, 2017; 6:00 p.m., P12N | | at No. 7 Washington | L 67–90 | 15–6 (3–6) | Alaska Airlines Arena (4,608); Seattle, WA |
| January 29, 2017; 1:00 p.m. | | at Washington State | L 79–84 | 15–7 (3–7) | Beasley Coliseum (639); Pullman, WA |
| February 3, 2017; 8:00 p.m., P12N | | No. 13 UCLA | W 80–77 | 16–7 (4–7) | Haas Pavilion (2,461); Berkeley, CA |
| February 5, 2017; 10:30 a.m. | | USC | W 63–56 | 17–7 (5–7) | Haas Pavilion (3,052); Berkeley, CA |
| February 10, 2017; 6:00 p.m., P12N | | Utah | L 64–73 | 17–8 (5–8) | Haas Pavilion (1,537); Berkeley, CA |
| February 12, 2017; 3:00 p.m., P12N | | Colorado | L 59–64 | 17–9 (5–9) | Haas Pavilion (3,024); Berkeley, CA |
| February 16, 2017; 8:00 p.m., P12N | | No. 10 Stanford | L 66–72 | 17–10 (5–10) | Haas Pavilion (4,965); Berkeley, CA |
| February 19, 2017; 5:00 p.m., P12N | | at No. 10 Stanford | L 54–72 | 17–11 (5–11) | Maples Pavilion (4,327); Stanford, CA |
| February 24, 2017; 6:00 p.m. | | at Oregon | W 61–55 | 18–11 (6–11) | Matthew Knight Arena (2,691); Eugene, OR |
| February 26, 2017; 11:00 a.m., P12N | | at No. 10 Oregon State | L 56–71 | 18–12 (6–12) | Gill Coliseum (4,704); Corvallis, OR |
Pac-12 women's tournament
| March 2, 2017; 11:30 a.m., P12N | (8) | vs. (9) USC; First round | W 71–58 | 19–12 | KeyArena; Seattle, WA |
| March 3, 2017; 11:30 a.m., P12N | (8) | vs. (1) No. 6 Oregon State; Quarterfinals | L 49–65 | 19–13 | KeyArena; Seattle, WA |
NCAA women's tournament
| March 18, 2017*; 6:00 p.m., ESPN2 | (9 O) | vs. (8 O) LSU; First round | W 55–52 | 20–13 | Ferrell Center (4,169); Waco, TX |
| March 20, 2017*; 6:00 p.m., ESPN2 | (9 O) | at (1 O) No. 5 Baylor; Second round | L 46–86 | 20–14 | Ferrell Center (3,910); Waco, TX |
*Non-conference game. ^{#}Rankings from AP poll. (#) Tournament seedings in parentheses. O=Oklahoma City Region. All times are in Pacific.

== Rankings ==
Regular-season polls
| Poll | Pre- season | Week 2 | Week 3 | Week 4 | Week 5 | Week 6 | Week 7 | Week 8 | Week 9 | Week 10 | Week 11 | Week 12 | Week 13 | Week 14 | Week 15 | Week 16 | Week 17 | Week 18 | Week 19 | Final |
|---|---|---|---|---|---|---|---|---|---|---|---|---|---|---|---|---|---|---|---|---|
| AP | NR | RV | RV | RV | RV | RV | RV | 21 | 20т | 24 | RV | RV | NR | RV | NR | NR | NR | NR | NR | N/A |
| Coaches | RV | RV | RV | RV | RV | 24 | 21 | 18 | 20 | 23 | RV | NR | RV | 24 | RV | NR | NR | NR | NR | NR |

Legend
| | Increase in ranking |
| | Decrease in ranking |
| | Not ranked previous week |
| (RV) | Received votes |

== See also ==
- 2016–17 California Golden Bears men's basketball team
