= 2017 Pac-12 Conference women's basketball tournament =

- Classification: Division I
- Season: 2016–17
- Teams: 12
- Site: KeyArena; Seattle, WA
- Champions: Stanford (12th title)
- Winning coach: Tara VanDerVeer (12th title)
- MVP: Alanna Smith (Stanford)
- Attendance: 37,317
- Television: Pac-12 Network, ESPN2

2016–17 Pac-12 Conference women's basketball standings
	Conf.				Overall
Team	W		L	PCT	W		L	PCT
No. 8 Oregon State	16	–	2	.889	31	–	5	.861
No. 6 Stanford †	15	–	3	.833	32	–	6	.842
No. 12 Washington	15	–	3	.833	29	–	6	.829
No. 15 UCLA	13	–	5	.722	25	–	9	.735
Arizona State	9	–	9	.500	20	–	13	.606
Oregon	8	–	10	.444	23	–	14	.622
California	6	–	12	.333	20	–	14	.588
Washington State	6	–	12	.333	16	–	20	.444
Colorado	5	–	13	.278	17	–	16	.515
Utah	5	–	13	.278	16	–	15	.516
USC	5	–	13	.278	14	–	16	.467
Arizona	5	–	13	.278	14	–	16	.467
† 2017 Pac-12 tournament winner As of March 31, 2017; Rankings from AP poll

The 2017 Pac-12 Conference women's basketball tournament presented by New York Life was the postseason women's basketball tournament at KeyArena in Seattle, Washington from March 2–5, 2017. Stanford defeated Oregon State 48–43 to win the automatic bid into the Women's NCAA Tournament.

== Seeds ==
Teams were seeded by conference record, with ties broken in the following order:

- Record between the tied teams
- Record against the highest-seeded team not involved in the tie, going down through the seedings as necessary
- Higher RPI

Seed	School	Conf (Overall)	Tiebreaker
#1	Oregon State	16–2	
#2	Stanford	15–3	1–0 vs. WASH
#3	Washington	15–3	0–1 vs. STAN
#4	UCLA	13–5	
#5	Arizona State	9–9	
#6	Oregon	8–10	
#7	Washington State	6–12	1–0 vs. CAL
#8	California	6–12	0–1 vs. WSU
#9	USC	5–13	2–2 vs. ARIZ/COLO/UTAH, 1–1 vs. OSU
#10	Colorado	5–13	2–2 vs. ARIZ/USC/UTAH, 0–2 vs. OSU, 2–1 vs. ARIZ/UTAH
#11	Arizona	5–13	2–2 vs. COLO/USC/UTAH, 0–1 vs. OSU, 1–1 vs. COLO/UTAH
#12	Utah	5–13	2–2 vs. ARIZ/COLO/USC, 0–2 vs. OSU, 1–2 vs. ARIZ/COLO

== Schedule ==
Thursday-Sunday, March 2–5, 2017

The top four seeds received a first-round bye.

Session	Game	Time*	Matchup^{#}	Television	Attendance
First Round – Thursday, March 2
1	1	11:30 AM	#8 California vs. #9 USC	P12N	3,601
1	2	2:00 PM	#5 Arizona State vs. #12 Utah	P12N	3,601
2	3	6:00 PM	#7 Washington State vs. #10 Colorado	P12N	4,158
2	4	8:30 PM	#6 Oregon vs. #11 Arizona	P12N	4,158
Quarterfinals – Friday, March 3
3	5	11:30 AM	#1 Oregon State vs. #8 California	P12N	4,659
3	6	2:00 PM	#4 UCLA vs. #5 Arizona State	P12N	4,659
4	7	6:00 PM	#2 Stanford vs. #7 Washington State	P12N	9,686
4	8	8:30 PM	#3 Washington vs. #6 Oregon	P12N	9,686
Semifinals – Saturday, March 4
5	9	6:00 PM	#1 Oregon State vs. #4 UCLA	P12N	8,384
5	10	8:30 PM	#2 Stanford vs. #6 Oregon	P12N	8,384
Championship Game – Sunday, March 5
6	11	6:00 PM	#1 Oregon State vs. #2 Stanford	ESPN2	6,829
*Game Times in PT.

== Bracket ==
First round Thursday, March 2 P12N
8	California	71
9	USC	58
5	Arizona State	72
12	Utah	54
7	Washington State	79
10	Colorado	78
6	Oregon	70
11	Arizona	63

Quarterfinals; Friday, March 3 P12N
1	#7 Oregon State	65
8	California	49
4	#15 UCLA	77
5	Arizona State	68
2	#10 Stanford	66
7	Washington State	36
3	#11 Washington	69
6	Oregon	70

Semifinals; Saturday, March 4 P12N
1	#7 Oregon State	63
4	#15 UCLA	53
2	#10 Stanford	71
6	Oregon	56

Championship Game; Sunday, March 5 ESPN2
1	#7 Oregon State	43
2	#10 Stanford	48

=== All-Tournament Team ===
Name	Pos.	Year	Team
Kristine Anigwe	F	So.	California
Jordin Canada	G	Jr.	UCLA
Sabrina Ionescu	G	Fr.	Oregon
Erica McCall	F	Sr.	Stanford
Alanna Smith	F	So.	Stanford
Sydney Wiese	G	Sr.	Oregon State

=== Most Outstanding Player ===
Name	Pos.	Year	Team
Erica McCall	F	Sr.	Stanford

== See also ==
- 2017 Pac-12 Conference men's basketball tournament
