= 2016–17 Washington Huskies women's basketball team =

Intercollegiate basketball season

2016–17 Washington Huskies women's basketball

NCAA tournament, Sweet Sixteen
- Conference: Pac-12 Conference

Ranking
- Coaches: No. 11
- AP: No. 12
- Record: 29–6 (15–3 Pac-12)
- Head coach: Mike Neighbors (4th season)
- Assistant coaches: Morgan Valley; Todd Schaefer; Jasmine Lister
- Home arena: Alaska Airlines Arena

2016–17 Pac-12 Conference women's basketball standings
	Conf.				Overall
Team	W		L	PCT	W		L	PCT
No. 8 Oregon State	16	–	2	.889	31	–	5	.861
No. 6 Stanford †	15	–	3	.833	32	–	6	.842
No. 12 Washington	15	–	3	.833	29	–	6	.829
No. 15 UCLA	13	–	5	.722	25	–	9	.735
Arizona State	9	–	9	.500	20	–	13	.606
Oregon	8	–	10	.444	23	–	14	.622
California	6	–	12	.333	20	–	14	.588
Washington State	6	–	12	.333	16	–	20	.444
Colorado	5	–	13	.278	17	–	16	.515
Utah	5	–	13	.278	16	–	15	.516
USC	5	–	13	.278	14	–	16	.467
Arizona	5	–	13	.278	14	–	16	.467
† 2017 Pac-12 tournament winner As of March 31, 2017; Rankings from AP poll

The 2016–17 Washington Huskies women's basketball team represented University of Washington during the 2016–17 NCAA Division I women's basketball season. The Huskies, led by fourth-year head coach Mike Neighbors, played their home games at Alaska Airlines Arena and were members of the Pac-12 Conference. In the final regular season game for the Huskies on February 25, 2017, Kelsey Plum scored a Pac-12 record 57 points in an 84–77 win over Utah to set NCAA Division I women's basketball career scoring record. They finished the season 29–6, 15–3 in Pac-12 play to finish in a tie for second place. They were upset by the 10 seed Oregon in the quarterfinals of Pac-12 women's tournament. They received an at-large bid to the NCAA women's tournament where they defeated Montana State and Oklahoma in the first and second rounds before losing to Mississippi State in the sweet sixteen. They had 29 wins in the regular season, the most in school history.

On April 3, Mike Neighbors resigned from Washington to accept a head coaching job at Arkansas. He finished with a four-year record of 98–41.

== Roster ==
2016–17 Washington Huskies women's basketball team
Players
Coaches

Pos.	#	Name	Height	Year	Previous school	Hometown
F/C	0	Chantel Osahor	6 ft 2 in (1.88 m)	Sr	Saint Mary's	Phoenix, AZ
F	1	Hannah Johnson	6 ft 1 in (1.85 m)	RS So	Bishop Alemany	Los Angeles, CA
G	2	Aari McDonald	5 ft 7 in (1.7 m)	Fr	Brookside	Tracy, CA
F	3	Mai-Loni Henson	6 ft 1 in (1.85 m)	Fr	La Jolla Country Day	Temecula, CA
G	4	Amber Melgoza	5 ft 10 in (1.78 m)	Fr	Santa Barbara	Santa Barbara, CA
G	5	Natalie Romeo	5 ft 7 in (1.7 m)	Jr	Carondelet; Nebraska	Martinez, CA
G	10	Kelsey Plum	5 ft 9 in (1.75 m)	Sr	La Jolla Country Day	Poway, CA
F/C	13	Katie Collier	6 ft 3 in (1.91 m)	RS Sr	Seattle Christian	Covington, WA
G/F	14	Heather Corral	6 ft 1 in (1.85 m)	RS Jr	Prairie	Vancouver, WA
G/F	15	Khalia Lark	6 ft 0 in (1.83 m)	Jr	Mater Dei	Irvine, CA
G	20	Kelli Kingma	5 ft 8 in (1.73 m)	Jr	Henry M. Jackson	Mill Creek, WA
G	21	Brianna Ruiz	5 ft 10 in (1.78 m)	RS Jr	Del Oro	Sacramento, CA
G	24	Jenna Moser	5 ft 6 in (1.68 m)	Jr	Colton	Colton, WA
F	32	Gigi Garcia	6 ft 2 in (1.88 m)	Fr	C. K. McClatchy	Sacramento, CA
C	34	Deja Strother	6 ft 5 in (1.96 m)	So	Inglemoor	Kenmore, WA
G	42	Mackenzie Wieburg	5 ft 9 in (1.75 m)	Jr	Issaquah	Sammamish, WA

Head coach

- Mike Neighbors (Arkansas)

Assistant coach(es)

- Morgan Valley (Connecticut)
- Todd Schaefer (Thomas More)
- Jasmine Lister (Vanderbilt)

Legend

- (C) Team captain
- (S) Suspended
- (I) Ineligible
- (W) Walk-on
- Injured
- Current redshirt

Roster

== Schedule ==
Date time, TV	Rank^{#}	Opponent^{#}	Result	Record	Site (attendance) city, state
Exhibition
10/29/2016*; 5:30 pm	No. 17	Central Washington	W 97–66		Alaska Airlines Arena; Seattle, WA
11/02/2016*; 7:00 pm	No. 17	Concordia (OR)	W 99–57		Alaska Airlines Arena; Seattle, WA
Non-conference regular season
11/11/2016*; 7:00 pm	No. 17	Eastern Washington; Preseason WNIT First Round	W 100–52	1–0	Alaska Airlines Arena (2,263); Seattle, WA
11/14/2016*; 7:00 pm	No. 17	Colorado State; Preseason WNIT quarterfinals	W 101–68	2–0	Alaska Airlines Arena (1,520); Seattle, WA
11/17/2016*; 5:00 pm	No. 17	No. 25 Missouri; Preseason WNIT semifinals	W 79–66	3–0	Alaska Airlines Arena (1,701); Seattle, WA
11/20/2016*; 12:00 pm, CBSSN	No. 17	at No. 1 Notre Dame; Preseason WNIT championship	L 60–71	3–1	Edmund P. Joyce Center (8,106); South Bend, IN
11/22/2016*; 5:00 pm	No. 15	Idaho	W 105–53	4–1	Alaska Airlines Arena (1,531); Seattle, WA
11/26/2016*; 4:00 pm	No. 15	at Seattle	W 94–64	5–1	Connolly Center (603); Seattle, WA
11/27/2016*; 2:00 pm	No. 15	at Portland	W 83–53	6–1	Chiles Center (537); Portland, OR
12/01/2016*; 6:00 pm	No. 13	at Grand Canyon	W 101–66	7–1	GCU Arena (754); Phoenix, AZ
12/04/2016*; 2:00 pm	No. 13	Fresno State	W 85–54	8–1	Alaska Airlines Arena; Seattle, WA
12/07/2016*; 7:00 pm	No. 11	Cal State Northridge	W 101–44	9–1	Alaska Airlines Arena (1,454); Seattle, WA
12/11/2016*; 2:00 pm, P12N	No. 11	Boise State	W 94–66	10–1	Alaska Airlines Arena (2,028); Seattle, WA
12/18/2016*; 2:00 pm	No. 11	Savannah State	W 87–36	11–1	Alaska Airlines Arena (1,864); Seattle, WA
12/22/2016*; 1:00 pm	No. 9	at BYU	W 82–70	12–1	Marriott Center (775); Provo, UT
Pac-12 regular season
12/27/2016; 7:00 pm, P12N	No. 9	Washington State	W 94–63	13–1 (1–0)	Alaska Airlines Arena (4,635); Seattle, WA
12/30/2016; 3:00 pm	No. 9	at Oregon	W 99–77	14–1 (2–0)	Matthew Knight Arena (2,858); Eugene, OR
01/01/2017; 12:00 pm, P12N	No. 9	at No. 22 Oregon State	L 70–73	14–2 (2–1)	Gill Coliseum (4,077); Corvallis, OR
01/06/2017; 8:00 pm, P12N	No. 12	USC	W 77–67	15–2 (3–1)	Alaska Airlines Arena (2,377); Seattle, WA
01/08/2017; 2:00 pm, ESPN2	No. 12	No. 9 UCLA	W 82–70	16–2 (4–1)	Alaska Airlines Arena (4,446); Seattle, WA
01/13/2017; 6:00 pm, P12N	No. 8	at Arizona	W 84–70	17–2 (5–1)	McKale Center (1,684); Tucson, AZ
01/15/2017; 5:00 pm, P12N	No. 8	at No. 19 Arizona State	W 65–54	18–2 (6–1)	Wells Fargo Arena (2,314); Tempe, AZ
01/22/2017; 1:00 pm, P12N	No. 8	at Washington State	W 87–44	19–2 (7–1)	Beasley Coliseum (987); Pullman, WA
01/27/2017; 6:00 pm, P12N	No. 7	California	W 90–67	20–2 (8–1)	Alaska Airlines Arena (4,608); Seattle, WA
01/29/2017; 5:00 pm, P12N	No. 7	No. 10 Stanford	L 68–72	20–3 (8–2)	Alaska Airlines Arena (10,000); Seattle, WA
02/03/2017; 7:00 pm, P12N	No. 10	at Utah	W 82–53	21–3 (9–2)	Jon M. Huntsman Center (2,375); Salt Lake City, UT
02/05/2017; 11:00 am, P12N	No. 10	at Colorado	W 79–75	22–3 (10–2)	Coors Events Center (1,818); Boulder, CO
02/10/2017; 8:00 pm, P12N	No. 10	Arizona	W 91–55	23–3 (11–2)	Alaska Airlines Arena (4,088); Seattle, WA
02/12/2017; 5:00 pm, P12N	No. 10	No. 23 Arizona State	W 70–57	24–3 (12–2)	Alaska Airlines Arena (6,248); Seattle, WA
02/17/2017; 8:00 pm, P12N	No. 9	at No. 18 UCLA	L 79–90	24–4 (12–3)	Pauley Pavilion (1,699); Los Angeles, CA
02/19/2017; 3:00 pm, P12N	No. 9	at USC	W 87–74	25–4 (13–3)	Galen Center (1,513); Los Angeles, CA
02/23/2017; 8:00 pm, P12N	No. 11	Colorado	W 79–47	26–4 (14–3)	Alaska Airlines Arena (4,448); Seattle, WA
02/25/2017; 2:00 pm, P12N	No. 11	Utah	W 84–77	27–4 (15–3)	Alaska Airlines Arena (6,775); Seattle, WA
Pac-12 Women's Tournament
03/03/2017; 8:30 pm, P12N	(3) No. 11	vs. (6) Oregon; Quarterfinals	L 69–70	27–5	KeyArena (9,686); Seattle, WA
NCAA Women's Tournament
03/18/2017*; 6:00 pm, ESPN2	(3 O) No. 11	(14 O) Montana State; First Round	W 91–63	28–5	Alaska Airlines Arena (8,059); Seattle, WA
03/20/2017*; 6:00 pm, ESPN2	(3 O) No. 11	(6 O) No. 23 Oklahoma; Second Round	W 108–82	29–5	Alaska Airlines Arena (7,579); Seattle, WA
03/24/2017*; 4:00 pm, ESPN2	(3 O) No. 11	vs. (2 O) No. 7 Mississippi State; Sweet Sixteen	L 64–75	29–6	Chesapeake Energy Arena; Oklahoma City, OK
*Non-conference game. ^{#}Rankings from AP Poll. (#) Tournament seedings in parentheses. O=Oklahoma City Region. All times are in Pacific Time.

== Rankings ==
Regular season polls
Poll	Pre- season	Week 2	Week 3	Week 4	Week 5	Week 6	Week 7	Week 8	Week 9	Week 10	Week 11	Week 12	Week 13	Week 14	Week 15	Week 16	Week 17	Week 18	Week 19	Final
AP	17	17	15	13	11	11	9	9	12	8	8	7	10	10	9	11	11	12	12	N/A
Coaches	15	15	13	13	11	11	9	9	11	9	7	7	10	8	9	12	10	11	11	11

Legend
	Increase in ranking
	Decrease in ranking
	Not ranked previous week
(RV)	Received votes

== See also ==
- 2016–17 Washington Huskies men's basketball team
