= 2016–17 Utah Utes women's basketball team =

Intercollegiate basketball season

2016–17 Utah Utes women's basketball

WNIT, First Round
- Conference: Pac-12 Conference
- Record: 16–15 (5–13 Pac–12)
- Head coach: Lynne Roberts (2nd season)
- Assistant coaches: Gavin Petersen; Danyelle Snelgro; Wesley Brooks
- Home arena: Jon M. Huntsman Center

2016–17 Pac-12 Conference women's basketball standings
	Conf.				Overall
Team	W		L	PCT	W		L	PCT
No. 8 Oregon State	16	–	2	.889	31	–	5	.861
No. 6 Stanford †	15	–	3	.833	32	–	6	.842
No. 12 Washington	15	–	3	.833	29	–	6	.829
No. 15 UCLA	13	–	5	.722	25	–	9	.735
Arizona State	9	–	9	.500	20	–	13	.606
Oregon	8	–	10	.444	23	–	14	.622
California	6	–	12	.333	20	–	14	.588
Washington State	6	–	12	.333	16	–	20	.444
Colorado	5	–	13	.278	17	–	16	.515
Utah	5	–	13	.278	16	–	15	.516
USC	5	–	13	.278	14	–	16	.467
Arizona	5	–	13	.278	14	–	16	.467
† 2017 Pac-12 tournament winner As of March 31, 2017; Rankings from AP poll

The 2016–17 Utah Utes women's basketball team represented the University of Utah during the 2016–17 NCAA Division I women's basketball season. The Utes, led by second-year head coach Lynne Roberts, played their home games at the Jon M. Huntsman Center and were members of the Pac-12 Conference. They finished the season 16–15, 5–13 in Pac-12 play to finish in a four-way tie for ninth place. They lost in the first round of the Pac-12 women's tournament to Arizona State. They were invited to the Women's National Invitation Tournament, where they lost to UC Davis in the first round.

== Roster ==
2016–17 Utah Utes women's basketball team
Players
Coaches

Pos.	#	Name	Height	Year	Previous school	Hometown
G	0	Kiana Moore	5 ft 7 in (1.7 m)	Fr	Vanden HS	Fairfield, CA
F	3	Malia Nawahine	5 ft 10 in (1.78 m)	RS Jr	Springville HS	Springville, UT
F	5	Megan Huff (I) (redshirt)	6 ft 3 in (1.91 m)	Jr	Todd Beamer HS; Hawaii	Federal Way, WA
G/F	10	Megan Jacobs	6 ft 1 in (1.85 m)	Fr	Bishop Gorman HS	Las Vegas, NV
G	11	Erika Bean	5 ft 8 in (1.73 m)	So	Bradshaw Christian HS	Sacramento, CA
F	12	Emily Potter	6 ft 6 in (1.98 m)	RS Jr	Glenlawn Collegiate	Winnipeg, MB
G	14	Paige Crozon	6 ft 1 in (1.85 m)	RS Sr	Humboldt Collegiate Institute	Humboldt, SK
F	21	Wendy Anae	6 ft 3 in (1.91 m)	RS Jr	Cathedral Catholic HS	San Diego, CA
G/F	23	Daneesha Provo	5 ft 11 in (1.8 m)	RS So	Kent School; Clemson	Dartmouth, NS
G	24	Tilar Clark	5 ft 11 in (1.8 m)	Jr	Skyline HS; Salt Lake CC	Idaho Falls, ID
G/F	32	Tanaeya Boclair	6 ft 0 in (1.83 m)	Jr	Brennan HS	San Antonio, TX
C	33	Joeseta Fatuesi	6 ft 4 in (1.93 m)	Jr	Wilcox HS	Santa Clara, CA

Head coach

- Lynne Roberts (Seattle Pacific)

Assistant coach(es)

- Gavin Petersen (Hawaiʻi)
- Danyelle Snelgro (Utah State)
- Wesley Brooks (West Virginia)

Legend

- (C) Team captain
- (S) Suspended
- (I) Ineligible
- (W) Walk-on
- Injured
- Current redshirt

Roster

== Schedule and results ==
Date time, TV	Rank^{#}	Opponent^{#}	Result	Record	Site (attendance) city, state
Exhibition
11/03/2016*; 11:00 am		South Dakota School of Mines	W 96–42		Jon M. Huntsman Center (1,820); Salt Lake City, UT
Non-conference regular season
11/12/2016*; 2:00 pm		Montana State	W 74–64	1–0	Jon M. Huntsman Center (1,211); Salt Lake City, UT
11/15/2016*; 8:00 pm		at Fresno State	W 65–55	2–0	Save Mart Center (1,887); Fresno, CA
11/19/2016*; 5:30 pm		Utah Valley	W 100–52	3–0	Jon M. Huntsman Center (1,237); Salt Lake City, UT
11/25/2016*; 1:00 pm		vs. Charlotte; Hilton Concord Thanksgiving Classic	W 81–68	4–0	McKeon Pavilion (160); Moraga, CA
11/26/2016*; 3:00 pm		at Saint Mary's; Hilton Concord Thanksgiving Classic	W 63–62	5–0	McKeon Pavilion (271); Moraga, CA
11/30/2016*; 7:00 pm		Southern Utah	W 69–43	6–0	Jon M. Huntsman Center (1,146); Salt Lake City, UT
12/03/2016*; 2:00 pm		Utah State	W 65–58	7–0	Jon M. Huntsman Center (1,190); Salt Lake City, UT
12/06/2016*; 7:30 pm		at Nevada	W 80–50	8–0	Lawlor Events Center (893); Reno, NV
12/10/2016*; 5:30 pm, P12N		BYU; Deseret First Duel	W 77–60	9–0	Jon M. Huntsman Center (3,033); Salt Lake City, UT
12/17/2016*; 2:00 pm		Weber State	W 71–52	10–0	Jon M. Huntsman Center (925); Salt Lake City, UT
12/21/2016*; 2:00 pm		Northern Arizona	W 78–65	11–0	Jon M. Huntsman Center (978); Salt Lake City, UT
Pac-12 regular season
12/30/2016; 8:00 pm		at No. 10 UCLA	L 56–67	11–1 (0–1)	Pauley Pavilion (1,186); Los Angeles, CA
01/01/2016; 1:00 pm		at USC	W 58–53	12–1 (1–1)	Galen Center (592); Los Angeles, CA
01/06/2016; 7:00 pm, P12N		No. 19 Arizona State	L 44–66	12–2 (1–2)	Jon M. Huntsman Center (1,662); Salt Lake City, UT
01/08/2016; 12:00 pm, P12N		Arizona	L 70–81	12–3 (1–3)	Jon M. Huntsman Center (1,135); Salt Lake City, UT
01/13/2016; 6:00 pm, P12N		No. 13 Stanford	L 58–77	12–4 (1–4)	Jon M. Huntsman Center (2,340); Salt Lake City, UT
01/15/2016; 12:00 pm, P12N		No. 24 California	W 63–57	13–4 (2–4)	Jon M. Huntsman Center (1,250); Salt Lake City, UT
01/20/2016; 9:00 pm, P12N		at No. 11 Oregon State	L 44–70	13–5 (2–5)	Gill Coliseum (3,747); Corvallis, OR
01/22/2016; 2:00 pm, P12N		at Oregon	L 66–84	13–6 (2–6)	Matthew Knight Arena (2,657); Eugene, OR
01/25/2016; 7:00 pm, P12N		at Colorado	L 49–54	13–7 (2–7)	Coors Events Center (1,457); Boulder, CO
01/28/2016; 12:30 pm, P12N		Colorado	W 58–53	14–7 (3–7)	Jon M. Huntsman Center (1,449); Salt Lake City, UT
02/03/2016; 8:00 pm, P12N		No. 10 Washington	L 53–82	14–8 (3–8)	Jon M. Huntsman Center (2,375); Salt Lake City, UT
02/05/2016; 2:00 pm		Washington State	L 55–61	14–9 (3–9)	Jon M. Huntsman Center (1,152); Salt Lake City, UT
02/10/2016; 7:00 pm, P12N		at California	W 73–64	15–9 (4–9)	Haas Pavilion (1,537); Berkeley, CA
02/12/2016; 2:00 pm, P12N		at No. 8 Stanford	L 51–87	15–10 (4–10)	Maples Pavilion (3,601); Stanford, CA
02/17/2016; 6:00 pm, P12N		Oregon	L 61–73	15–11 (4–11)	Jon M. Huntsman Center (2,683); Salt Lake City, UT
02/19/2016; 2:00 pm, P12N		No. 11 Oregon State	L 49–63	15–12 (4–12)	Jon M. Huntsman Center (1,949); Salt Lake City, UT
02/23/2016; 7:00 pm, P12N		at Washington State	W 74–57	16–12 (5–12)	Beasley Coliseum (611); Pullman, WA
02/25/2016; 3:00 pm, P12N		at No. 11 Washington	L 77–84	16–13 (5–13)	Alaska Airlines Arena (6,775); Seattle, WA
Pac-12 Women's Tournament
03/02/2017; 3:00 pm, P12N	(12)	vs. (5) Arizona State; First Round	L 54–72	16–14	KeyArena (3,061); Seattle, WA
Women's National Invitation Tournament
03/17/2017*; 6:00 pm		UC Davis; First Round	L 62–72	16–15	Jon M. Huntsman Center (456); Salt Lake City, UT
*Non-conference game. ^{#}Rankings from AP Poll/Coaches' Poll. (#) Tournament seedings in parentheses. All times are in Mountain Time.

== Rankings ==
((main|2016–17 NCAA Division I women's basketball rankings))

Regular season polls
Poll	Pre- season	Week 2	Week 3	Week 4	Week 5	Week 6	Week 7	Week 8	Week 9	Week 10	Week 11	Week 12	Week 13	Week 14	Week 15	Week 16	Week 17	Week 18	Week 19	Final
AP	NR	NR	NR	NR	NR	NR	NR	RV	NR	NR	NR	NR	NR	NR						N/A
Coaches	NR	NR	NR	NR	NR	NR	RV	RV	RV	NR	NR	NR	NR	NR						

Legend
	Increase in ranking
	Decrease in ranking
	Not ranked previous week
(RV)	Received votes

== See also ==
- 2016–17 Utah Utes men's basketball team
