= 2016–17 Oregon State Beavers women's basketball team =

Intercollegiate basketball season

2016–17 Oregon State Beavers women's basketball

Maui Wahine Classic Champions Play4Kay Shootout Champions Pac-12 regular season champions

NCAA Women's Tournament, Sweet Sixteen
- Conference: Pac-12 Conference

Ranking
- Coaches: No. 9
- AP: No. 8
- Record: 31–5 (16–2 Pac-12)
- Head coach: Scott Rueck (7th season)
- Associate head coach: Brian Holsinger
- Assistant coaches: Jonas Chatterton; Eric Ely; Katie Baker
- Home arena: Gill Coliseum

2016–17 Pac-12 Conference women's basketball standings
	Conf.				Overall
Team	W		L	PCT	W		L	PCT
No. 8 Oregon State	16	–	2	.889	31	–	5	.861
No. 6 Stanford †	15	–	3	.833	32	–	6	.842
No. 12 Washington	15	–	3	.833	29	–	6	.829
No. 15 UCLA	13	–	5	.722	25	–	9	.735
Arizona State	9	–	9	.500	20	–	13	.606
Oregon	8	–	10	.444	23	–	14	.622
California	6	–	12	.333	20	–	14	.588
Washington State	6	–	12	.333	16	–	20	.444
Colorado	5	–	13	.278	17	–	16	.515
Utah	5	–	13	.278	16	–	15	.516
USC	5	–	13	.278	14	–	16	.467
Arizona	5	–	13	.278	14	–	16	.467
† 2017 Pac-12 tournament winner As of March 31, 2017; Rankings from AP poll

The 2016–17 Oregon State Beavers women's basketball team represented Oregon State University during the 2016–17 NCAA Division I women's basketball season. The Beavers, led by seventh-year head coach Scott Rueck, played their games at the Gill Coliseum and were members of the Pac-12 Conference. They finished the season 31–5, 16–2 in Pac-12 play to win the Pac-12 regular season title. They advanced to the championship game of the Pac-12 women's tournament, where they lost to Stanford. They received an at-large bid to the NCAA women's tournament, where they defeated Long Beach State and Creighton in the first and second rounds before losing to Florida State in the sweet sixteen.

== Roster ==
2016–17 Oregon State Beavers women's basketball team
Players
Coaches

Pos.	#	Name	Height	Year	Previous school	Hometown
G	0	Mikayla Pivec	5 ft 9 in (1.75 m)	Fr	Lynnwood HS	Lynnwood, WA
G/F	3	Madison Washington	6 ft 1 in (1.85 m)	Fr	Bishop Gorman HS	Las Vegas, NV
F/C	4	Breanna Brown	6 ft 3 in (1.91 m)	RS Jr	Bishop O'Dowd HS	Oakland, CA
G	10	Katie McWilliams	6 ft 2 in (1.88 m)	So	South Salem HS	Salem, OR
G	11	Gabriella Hanson	5 ft 11 in (1.8 m)	Sr	Troy HS	Anaheim, CA
F	12	Kolbie Orum	6 ft 3 in (1.91 m)	Sr	Maple Ridge Secondary	Maple Ridge, BC
F	13	Janessa Thropay	6 ft 2 in (1.88 m)	Fr	Chino HS	Chino, CA
C	21	Marie Gülich	6 ft 5 in (1.96 m)	Jr	Landrat-Lucas Gymnasium	Cologne, Germany
G	22	Katharine Tudor	6 ft 0 in (1.83 m)	Fr	St. Mary's HS	Stockton, CA
G	24	Sydney Wiese	6 ft 0 in (1.83 m)	Sr	Pinnacle HS	Phoenix, AZ
G	25	Taylor Kalmer	5 ft 8 in (1.73 m)	So	Corona del Sol HS	Chandler, AZ
C	31	Tarea Green	6 ft 4 in (1.93 m)	RS Fr	Hillsboro HS	Hillsboro, OR

Head coach

- Scott Rueck (Oregon State)

Assistant coach(es)

- Brian Holsinger (Western Washington)
- Jonas Chatterton (Utah)
- Eric Ely (Northwest Nazarene)
- Mandy Close (Oregon State)

Legend

- (C) Team captain
- (S) Suspended
- (I) Ineligible
- (W) Walk-on
- Injured
- Current redshirt

Roster

== Schedule ==
Date time, TV	Rank^{#}	Opponent^{#}	Result	Record	Site (attendance) city, state
Exhibition
11/05/2016*; 4:00 pm	No. 25	Northwest Nazarene	W 78–51		Gill Coliseum; Corvallis, OR
Non-conference regular season
11/11/2016*; 2:00 pm	No. 25	Lamar	W 88–56	1–0	Gill Coliseum (3,078); Corvallis, OR
11/14/2016*; 6:00 pm	No. 24	Idaho State	W 61–38	2–0	Gill Coliseum (2,589); Corvallis, OR
11/18/2016*; 6:00 pm	No. 24	Portland	W 62–45	3–0	Gill Coliseum (3,306); Corvallis, OR
11/22/2016*; 6:00 pm, P12N	No. 22	Marquette	L 73–74	3–1	Gill Coliseum (2,884); Corvallis, OR
12/02/2016*; 8:30 pm	No. 24	vs. Idaho; Maui Wahine Classic	W 60–49	4–1	War Memorial Gym (922); Maui, HI
12/03/2016*; 8:30 pm	No. 24	vs. BYU; Maui Wahine Classic	W 65–56	5–1	War Memorial Gym (1,283); Maui, HI
12/10/2016*; 6:00 pm	No. 24	Southern Utah	W 77–38	6–1	Gill Coliseum (2,937); Corvallis, OR
12/14/2016*; 11:00 am		UC Davis	W 93–52	7–1	Gill Coliseum (5,168); Corvallis, OR
12/19/2016*; 8:00 pm	No. 25	vs. UNLV; Play4Kay Shootout quarterfinals	W 62–59	8–1	T-Mobile Arena (1,407); Paradise, NV
12/20/2016*; 8:00 pm	No. 25	vs. Quinnipiac; Play4Kay Shootout semifinals	W 75–60	9–1	T-Mobile Arena (1,096); Paradise, NV
12/21/2016*; 8:00 pm	No. 25	vs. Oklahoma State; Play4Kay Shootout championship	W 73–54	10–1	T-Mobile Arena (1,233); Paradise, NV
12/27/2016*; 6:00 pm	No. 22	Arkansas–Pine Bluff	W 73–40	11–1	Gill Coliseum (3,052); Corvallis, OR
Pac-12 regular season
12/30/2016; 4:00 pm	No. 22	Washington State	W 80–58	12–1 (1–0)	Gill Coliseum (3,429); Corvallis, OR
01/01/2017; 12:00 pm, P12N	No. 22	No. 9 Washington	W 73–70	13–1 (2–0)	Gill Coliseum (4,077); Corvallis, OR
01/06/2017; 6:00 pm, P12N	No. 16	at No. 20 California	W 66–56	14–1 (3–0)	Haas Pavilion (2,021); Berkeley, CA
01/08/2017; 5:00 pm, P12N	No. 16	at No. 10 Stanford	W 72–69 ^{2OT}	15–1 (4–0)	Maples Pavilion (3,072); Stanford, CA
01/13/2017; 6:00 pm, P12N	No. 10	at No. 17 UCLA	L 56–66	15–2 (4–1)	Pauley Pavilion (1,403); Los Angeles, CA
01/15/2017; 3:00 pm, P12N	No. 10	at USC	W 74–60	16–2 (5–1)	Galen Center (1,476); Los Angeles, CA
01/20/2017; 8:00 pm, P12N	No. 11	Utah	W 70–44	17–2 (6–1)	Gill Coliseum (3,747); Corvallis, OR
01/22/2017; 3:00 pm, P12N	No. 11	Colorado	W 81–57	18–2 (7–1)	Gill Coliseum (3,927); Corvallis, OR
01/27/2017; 8:00 pm, P12N	No. 11	at Oregon; Civil War	W 43–40	19–2 (8–1)	Matthew Knight Arena (4,370); Eugene, OR
01/29/2017; 11:00 am, ESPNU	No. 11	Oregon; Civil War	W 67–60	20–2 (9–1)	Gill Coliseum (6,005); Corvallis, OR
02/03/2017; 7:00 pm, P12N	No. 11	at No. 23 Arizona State	W 54–45	21–2 (10–1)	Wells Fargo Arena (4,025); Tempe, AZ
02/05/2017; 1:00 pm	No. 11	at Arizona	W 65–57	22–2 (11–1)	McKale Center (1,249); Tempe, AZ
02/10/2017; 8:00 pm, P12N	No. 9	USC	L 50–70	22–3 (11–2)	Gill Coliseum (4,286); Corvallis, OR
02/12/2017; 1:00 pm, P12N	No. 9	No. 15 UCLA	W 68–61	23–3 (12–2)	Gill Coliseum (4,980); Corvallis, OR
02/17/2017; 7:00 pm, P12N	No. 11	at Colorado	W 54–49	24–3 (13–2)	Coors Events Center (1,751); Boulder, CO
02/19/2017; 1:00 pm, P12N	No. 11	at Utah	W 63–49	25–3 (14–2)	Jon M. Huntsman Center (1,949); Salt Lake City, UT
02/24/2017; 8:00 pm, P12N	No. 10	No. 8 Stanford	W 50–47	26–3 (15–2)	Gill Coliseum (9,604); Corvallis, OR
02/26/2017; 11:00 am, P12N	No. 10	California	W 71–56	27–3 (16–2)	Gill Coliseum (4,704); Corvallis, OR
Pac-12 Women's Tournament
03/03/2017; 11:30 am, P12N	(1) No. 6	vs. (8) California; Quarterfinals	W 65–49	28–3	KeyArena (4,659); Seattle, WA
03/04/2017; 6:00 pm, P12N	(1) No. 6	vs. (4) No. 15 UCLA; Semifinals	W 63–53	29–3	KeyArena (8,384); Seattle, WA
03/05/2017; 6:00 pm, ESPN2	(1) No. 6	vs. (2) No. 10 Stanford; Championship Game	L 43–48	29–4	KeyArena (6,829); Seattle, WA
NCAA Women's Tournament
03/17/2017*; 2:00 pm, ESPN2	(2 S) No. 8	(15 S) Long Beach State; First Round	W 56–55	30–4	Gill Coliseum (4,692); Corvallis, OR
03/19/2017*; 6:00 pm, ESPN2	(2 S) No. 8	(7 S) Creighton; Second Round	W 64–52	31–4	Gill Coliseum (5,660); Corvallis, OR
03/25/2017*; 3:00 pm, ESPN	(2 S) No. 8	vs. (3 S) No. 10 Florida State; Sweet Sixteen	L 53–66	31–5	Stockton Arena (4,500); Stockton, CA
*Non-conference game. ^{#}Rankings from AP Poll. (#) Tournament seedings in parentheses. S=Stockton Region. All times are in Pacific Time.

== Rankings ==
Regular season polls
Poll	Pre- season	Week 2	Week 3	Week 4	Week 5	Week 6	Week 7	Week 8	Week 9	Week 10	Week 11	Week 12	Week 13	Week 14	Week 15	Week 16	Week 17	Week 18	Week 19	Final
AP	25	24	22	24	24	RV	25	22	16	10	11	11	11	9	11	10	6т	8	8	N/A
Coaches	17	18	15	18	16	15	15	15	12	10	12	11	11	9	11	8	6	8	8	9

Legend
	Increase in ranking
	Decrease in ranking
	Not ranked previous week
(RV)	Received votes

== See also ==
- 2016–17 Oregon State Beavers men's basketball team
