= 2016–17 Arizona Wildcats women's basketball team =

Intercollegiate basketball season

2016–17 Arizona Wildcats women's basketball
- Conference: Pac-12 Conference
- Record: 14–16 (5–13 Pac-12)
- Head coach: Adia Barnes (1st season)
- Assistant coaches: Sunny Smallwood; Salvo Coppa; Kelly Rae Finley
- Home arena: McKale Center

2016–17 Pac-12 Conference women's basketball standings
	Conf.				Overall
Team	W		L	PCT	W		L	PCT
No. 8 Oregon State	16	–	2	.889	31	–	5	.861
No. 6 Stanford †	15	–	3	.833	32	–	6	.842
No. 12 Washington	15	–	3	.833	29	–	6	.829
No. 15 UCLA	13	–	5	.722	25	–	9	.735
Arizona State	9	–	9	.500	20	–	13	.606
Oregon	8	–	10	.444	23	–	14	.622
California	6	–	12	.333	20	–	14	.588
Washington State	6	–	12	.333	16	–	20	.444
Colorado	5	–	13	.278	17	–	16	.515
Utah	5	–	13	.278	16	–	15	.516
USC	5	–	13	.278	14	–	16	.467
Arizona	5	–	13	.278	14	–	16	.467
† 2017 Pac-12 tournament winner As of March 31, 2017; Rankings from AP poll

The 2016–17 Arizona Wildcats women's basketball team represented University of Arizona during the 2016–17 NCAA Division I women's basketball season. The Wildcats, led by first-year head coach Adia Barnes, played their games at the McKale Center and were members of the Pac-12 Conference. They finished the season 14–16, 5–13 in Pac-12 play to finish in a 4 way ninth place. They lost in the first round of the Pac-12 women's basketball tournament to Oregon.

== Roster ==
2016–17 Arizona Wildcats women's basketball team
Players
Coaches

Pos.	#	Name	Height	Year	Previous school	Hometown
G	44	Charise Holloway	5 ft 9 in (1.75 m)	Jr	St. Mary's HS	Tracy, CA
G	4	Lucia Alonso	5 ft 7 in (1.7 m)	Fr	Aron Leon Cuna Del Parlamentarismo	Leon, Spain
F	0	Breanna Workman	6 ft 1 in (1.85 m)	Sr	Centennial HS	Las Vegas, NV
G	3	Taryn Griffey	5 ft 7 in (1.7 m)	Jr	Dr. Phillips HS	Seattle, WA
G	10	Lauren Evans	5 ft 11 in (1.8 m)	RS Sr	Hamilton HS	Phoenix, AZ
G	11	Cherice Harris	5 ft 8 in (1.73 m)	So	Etiwanda HS	Rancho Cucamonga, CA
C	13	Eugenie Simonet-Keller	6 ft 8 in (2.03 m)	So	IMG Academy	La Bigot, France
G	14	Malena Washington	5 ft 6 in (1.68 m)	Sr	Central HS	Beaumont, TX
G	20	Farrin Bell	6 ft 0 in (1.83 m)	RS Sr	Richardson HS	Richardson, TX
F	21	Destiny Graham	6 ft 3 in (1.91 m)	So	Eastside College Prep	East Palo Alto, CA
G	22	Bria Rice	5 ft 8 in (1.73 m)	Fr	Todd Beamer HS	Federal Way, WA
G	23	Michal Miller	5 ft 7 in (1.7 m)	So	Michigan City HS	Michigan City, IN
F	24	LaBrittney Jones	6 ft 1 in (1.85 m)	Sr	Cedar Hill HS	Cedar Hill, TX
F	31	Dejza James	6 ft 1 in (1.85 m)	Sr	Pleasant Grove HS	Elk Grove, CA
G	33	JaLea Bennett	6 ft 0 in (1.83 m)	Jr	Mansfield Timberview HS	Grand Prairie, TX

Head coach

- Adia Barnes (Arizona)

Assistant coach(es)

- Sunny Smallwood (Boise State)
- Salvo Coppa (IULM)
- Kelly Rae Finley (Colorado State)

Legend

- (C) Team captain
- (S) Suspended
- (I) Ineligible
- (W) Walk-on
- Injured
- Current redshirt

Roster

== Schedule ==
Date time, TV	Rank^{#}	Opponent^{#}	Result	Record	Site (attendance) city, state
Exhibition
Nov. 8, 2016*; 7:00 pm		Western New Mexico	W 77–48		McKale Center (1,233); Tucson, AZ
Non-conference regular season
Nov. 13, 2016*; 2:00 pm		Alcorn State	W 74–59	1–0	McKale Center (1,323); Tucson, AZ
Nov. 18, 2016*; 5:00 pm		at George Mason	W 81–70	2–0	EagleBank Arena (635); Fairfax, VA
Nov. 22, 2016*; 11:00 am		North Texas	L 58–62	2–1	McKale Center (8,442); Tucson, AZ
Nov. 26, 2016*; 2:00 pm		at Southern Utah	W 77–65	3–1	Centrum Arena (225); Cedar City, UT
Dec. 1, 2016*; 7:00 pm		Florida Atlantic	W 77–67	4–1	McKale Center (1,084); Tucson, AZ
Dec. 4, 2016*; 1:00 pm		at New Mexico State	W 74–63 ^{OT}	5–1	Pan American Center (912); Las Cruces, NM
Dec. 7, 2016*; 7:00 pm		San Diego	W 76–59	6–1	McKale Center (1,091); Tucson, AZ
Dec. 13, 2016*; 7:00 pm		Grambling State	W 73–46	7–1	McKale Center (1,060); Tucson, AZ
Dec. 18 ,2016*; 11:00 am		at Kansas	L 51–75	7–2	Allen Fieldhouse (1,884); Lawrence, KS
Dec. 21, 2016*; 6:00 pm		Utah State	W 61–57	8–2	McKale Center (1,133); Tucson, AZ
Dec. 27, 2016*; 7:00 pm		Portland State	W 75–52	9–2	McKale Center (1,206); Tucson, AZ
Pac-12 regular season
Dec. 29, 2016; 7:00 pm		No. 21 California	L 64–74	9–3 (0–1)	McKale Center (1,274); Tucson, AZ
Jan. 1, 2017; 2:00 pm		No. 13 Stanford	L 55–77	9–4 (0–2)	McKale Center (1,425); Tucson, AZ
Jan. 6, 2017; 7:00 pm		at Colorado	L 56–65	9–5 (0–3)	Coors Events Center (2,158); Boulder, CO
Jan. 8, 2017; 12:00 pm, P12N		at Utah	W 81–70	10–5 (1–3)	Jon M. Huntsman Center (1,135); Salt Lake City, UT
Jan. 13, 2017; 7:00 pm, P12N		No. 8 Washington	L 70–84	10–6 (1–4)	McKale Center (1,684); Tucson, AZ
Jan. 15, 2017; 12:00 pm, P12N		Washington State	W 56–55	11–6 (2–4)	McKale Center (1,425); Tucson, AZ
Jan. 20, 2017; 8:00 pm		at No. 10 Stanford	L 46–73	11–7 (2–5)	Maples Pavilion (3,796); Stanford, CA
Jan. 22, 2017; 2:00 pm, P12N		at California	L 60–71	11–8 (2–6)	Haas Pavilion (2,649); Berkeley, CA
Jan. 27, 2017; 8:00 pm		at USC	L 54–58	11–9 (2–7)	Galen Center (667); Los Angeles, CA
Jan. 29, 2017; 3:00 pm		at No. 13 UCLA	L 49–69	11–10 (2–8)	Pauley Pavilion (2,013); Los Angeles, CA
Feb. 3, 2017; 6:00 pm, P12N		Oregon	L 65–79	11–11 (2–9)	McKale Center (1,542); Tucson, AZ
Feb. 5, 2017; 2:00 pm		No. 11 Oregon State	L 57–65	11–12 (2–10)	McKale Center (1,249); Tucson, AZ
Feb. 10, 2017; 9:00 pm, P12N		at No. 7 Washington	L 55–91	11–13 (2–11)	Alaska Airlines Arena (4,088); Seattle, WA
Feb. 12, 2017; 12:00 pm, P12N		at Washington State	W 70–62	12–13 (3–11)	Beasley Coliseum (802); Pullman, WA
Feb. 17, 2017; 7:00 pm, P12N		Arizona State; Rivalry	W 62–58	13–13 (4–11)	McKale Center (2,085); Tucson, AZ
Feb. 19, 2017; 4:00 pm, P12N		at Arizona State; Rivalry	L 54–67	13–14 (4–12)	Wells Fargo Arena (3,772); Tempe, AZ
Feb. 24, 2017; 6:00 pm, P12N		No. 15 UCLA	L 56–79	13–15 (4–13)	McKale Center (1,652); Tucson, AZ
Feb. 26, 2017; 2:00 pm, P12N		USC	W 67–62	14–15 (5–13)	McKale Center (1,640); Tucson, AZ
Pac-12 Women's Tournament
Mar. 2, 2017; 9:30 pm, P12N	(11)	vs. (6) Oregon; First Round	L 63–70	14–16	KeyArena (4,158); Seattle, WA
*Non-conference game. ^{#}Rankings from AP Poll. (#) Tournament seedings in parentheses. All times are in Mountain Time.

== See also ==
2016–17 Arizona Wildcats men's basketball team
