= 2016–17 Oregon Ducks women's basketball team =

Intercollegiate basketball season

2016–17 Oregon Ducks women's basketball

NCAA tournament, Elite Eight
- Conference: Pac-12 Conference

Ranking
- Coaches: No. 16
- Record: 23–14 (8–10 Pac-12)
- Head coach: Kelly Graves (3rd season)
- Assistant coaches: Mark Campbell; Jodie Berry; Nicole Powell
- Home arena: Matthew Knight Arena

2016–17 Pac-12 Conference women's basketball standings
	Conf.				Overall
Team	W		L	PCT	W		L	PCT
No. 8 Oregon State	16	–	2	.889	31	–	5	.861
No. 6 Stanford †	15	–	3	.833	32	–	6	.842
No. 12 Washington	15	–	3	.833	29	–	6	.829
No. 15 UCLA	13	–	5	.722	25	–	9	.735
Arizona State	9	–	9	.500	20	–	13	.606
Oregon	8	–	10	.444	23	–	14	.622
California	6	–	12	.333	20	–	14	.588
Washington State	6	–	12	.333	16	–	20	.444
Colorado	5	–	13	.278	17	–	16	.515
Utah	5	–	13	.278	16	–	15	.516
USC	5	–	13	.278	14	–	16	.467
Arizona	5	–	13	.278	14	–	16	.467
† 2017 Pac-12 tournament winner As of March 31, 2017; Rankings from AP poll

The 2016–17 Oregon Ducks women's basketball team represented the University of Oregon during the 2016–17 NCAA Division I women's basketball season. The Ducks, led by third year head coach Kelly Graves, played their games at the Matthew Knight Arena and were members of the Pac-12 Conference. They finished the season 23–14, 8–10 in Pac-12 play to finish in sixth place. They advanced to the semifinals of the Pac-12 women's tournament where they lost to Stanford. They received an at-large bid to the NCAA women's tournament which was their first trip since 2005. They defeated Temple and upset Duke in the first and second rounds to advance to the sweet sixteen for the first time in school history where they upset Maryland to advance to the elite eight where they lost to Connecticut.

== Roster ==
2016–17 Oregon Ducks women's basketball team
Players
Coaches

Pos.	#	Name	Height	Year	Previous school	Hometown
G	2	Morgan Yaeger	5 ft 9 in (1.75 m)	Fr	St. John's School	Adelaide, Australia
G	3	Justine Hall	5 ft 10 in (1.78 m)	RS Jr	Regis Jesuit HS; Purdue	Denver, CO
G	5	Maite Cazorla	5 ft 10 in (1.78 m)	So	Segle XXI	Las Palmas, Spain
G	10	Lexi Bando	5 ft 9 in (1.75 m)	Jr	Willamette HS	Eugene, OR
G	11	Jayde Woods	6 ft 1 in (1.85 m)	Fr	Windward School	Yorba Linda, CA
G	12	Megan Trinder	5 ft 7 in (1.7 m)	RS Jr	Northeast CC	Hollywell, Australia
G	13	Mar'Shay Moore	5 ft 8 in (1.73 m)	Sr	Blue Mountain CC; Fort Vancouver HS	Vancouver, WA
F	14	Lydia Giomi	6 ft 6 in (1.98 m)	Fr	West Seattle HS	Seattle, WA
F	15	Jacinta Vandenberg	6 ft 5 in (1.96 m)	RS Sr	Fresno State; Sandringham College	Melbourne, Australia
G	20	Sabrina Ionescu	5 ft 10 in (1.78 m)	Fr	Miramonte HS	Walnut Creek, CA
F	22	Lauren Yearwood	6 ft 3 in (1.91 m)	So	Oak Bay HS	Victoria, BC
F	24	Ruthy Hebard	6 ft 4 in (1.93 m)	Fr	West Valley HS	Fairbanks, AK
F	32	Oti Gildon	6 ft 1 in (1.85 m)	So	Gonzaga Prep	Spokane, WA
F	44	Mallory McGwire	6 ft 5 in (1.96 m)	Fr	Reno HS	Reno, NV
F	52	Sierra Campisano	6 ft 3 in (1.91 m)	Fr	Torrey Pines HS	San Diego, CA

Head coach

- Kelly Graves (New Mexico)

Assistant coach(es)

- Jodie Berry (Western Washington)
- Mark Campbell (Hawaiʻi)
- Nicole Powell (Stanford)

Legend

- (C) Team captain
- (S) Suspended
- (I) Ineligible
- (W) Walk-on
- Injured
- Current redshirt

Roster

== Schedule ==
Date time, TV	Rank^{#}	Opponent^{#}	Result	Record	Site (attendance) city, state
Exhibition
10/29/2016*; 7:00 pm		Northwest Christian	W 89–36		Matthew Knight Arena (2,133); Eugene, OR
12/04/2016*; 12:00 pm		Vanguard	W 95–55		Matthew Knight Arena (1,961); Eugene, OR
Non-conference regular season
11/13/2016*; 2:00 pm		Lamar	W 84–67	1–0	Matthew Knight Arena (2,098); Eugene, OR
11/18/2016*; 6:00 pm		Cal State Bakersfield	W 77–62	2–0	Matthew Knight Arena (1,741); Eugene, OR
11/20/2016*; 2:00 pm		UTSA	W 77–63	3–0	Matthew Knight Arena (1,917); Eugene, OR
11/22/2016*; 8:00 pm, P12N		No. 24 Michigan State	W 88–55	4–0	Matthew Knight Arena (2,056); Eugene, OR
11/25/2016*; 6:30 pm		vs. No. 7 Mississippi State; Rainbow Wahine Shootout	L 63–75	4–1	Stan Sheriff Center; Honolulu, HI
11/26/2016*; 8:00 pm		at Hawaii; Rainbow Wahine Shootout	W 86–49	5–1	Stan Sheriff Center (2,042); Honolulu, HI
11/27/2016*; 5:00 pm		vs. San Jose State; Rainbow Wahine Shootout	W 91–62	6–1	Stan Sheriff Center; Honolulu, HI
12/09/2016*; 6:00 pm		Portland	W 81–41	7–1	Matthew Knight Arena (2,316); Eugene, OR
12/12/2016*; 4:00 pm	No. 25	at Clemson	W 87–59	8–1	Littlejohn Coliseum (313); Clemson, SC
12/14/2016*; 4:00 pm	No. 25	at Ole Miss	L 67–83	8–2	The Pavilion at Ole Miss (1,079); Oxford, MS
12/17/2016*; 5:00 pm	No. 25	vs. Portland State; Portland Showcase	W 90–46	9–2	Moda Center; Portland, OR
12/20/2016*; 12:00 pm		Idaho	W 73–70	10–2	Matthew Knight Arena (2,088); Eugene, OR
Pac-12 regular season
12/30/2016; 3:00 pm		No. 9 Washington	L 77–99	10–3 (0–1)	Matthew Knight Arena (2,858); Eugene, OR
01/01/2017; 2:00 pm		Washington State	L 59–75	10–4 (0–2)	Matthew Knight Arena (2,402); Eugene, OR
01/06/2017; 8:00 pm, P12N		at No. 10 Stanford	L 60–81	10–5 (0–3)	Maples Pavilion (2,723); Stanford, CA
01/08/2017; 1:00 pm, P12N		at No. 20 California	W 69–66	11–5 (1–3)	Haas Pavilion (4,273); Berkeley, CA
01/13/2017; 8:00 pm, P12N		at USC	W 59–53	12–5 (2–3)	Galen Center (954); Los Angeles, CA
01/15/2017; 1:00 pm, P12N		at No. 17 UCLA	L 63–79	12–6 (2–4)	Pauley Pavilion (2,074); Los Angeles, CA
01/20/2017; 6:00 pm, P12N		Colorado	W 71–66	13–6 (3–4)	Matthew Knight Arena (2,260); Eugene, OR
01/22/2017; 1:00 pm, P12N		Utah	W 84–66	14–6 (4–4)	Matthew Knight Arena (2,657); Eugene, OR
01/27/2017; 8:00 pm, P12N		No. 11 Oregon State; Civil War	L 40–43	14–7 (4–5)	Matthew Knight Arena (4,370); Eugene, OR
01/29/2017; 11:00 am, ESPNU		at No. 11 Oregon State; Civil War	L 60–67	14–8 (4–6)	Gill Coliseum (6,005); Corvallis, OR
02/03/2017; 5:00 pm, P12N		at Arizona	W 79–65	15–8 (5–6)	McKale Center (1,542); Tucson, AZ
02/05/2017; 11:00 am, P12N		at Arizona State	L 63–68	15–9 (5–7)	Wells Fargo Arena (1,986); Tempe, AZ
02/10/2017; 6:00 pm, P12N		No. 15 UCLA	W 84–75	16–9 (6–7)	Matthew Knight Arena (2,438); Eugene, OR
02/12/2017; 11:00 am, P12N		USC	W 73–50	17–9 (7–7)	Matthew Knight Arena (2,750); Eugene, OR
02/17/2017; 5:00 pm, P12N		at Utah	W 73–61	18–9 (8–7)	Jon M. Huntsman Center (2,683); Salt Lake City, UT
02/19/2017; 11:00 am, P12N		at Colorado	L 66–76	18–10 (8–8)	Coors Events Center (3,988); Boulder, CO
02/24/2017; 6:00 pm		California	L 55–61	18–11 (8–9)	Matthew Knight Arena (2,691); Eugene, OR
02/26/2017; 1:00 pm, P12N		No. 8 Stanford	L 59–65	18–12 (8–10)	Matthew Knight Arena (4,286); Eugene, OR
Pac-12 Women's Tournament
03/02/2017; 8:30 pm, P12N	(6)	vs. (11) Arizona; First Round	W 70–63	19–12	KeyArena (4,158); Seattle, WA
03/03/2017; 8:30 pm, P12N	(6)	vs. (3) No. 11 Washington; Quarterfinals	W 70–69	20–12	KeyArena (9,686); Seattle, WA
03/04/2017; 8:30 pm, P12N	(6)	vs. (2) No. 10 Stanford; Semifinals	L 56–71	20–13	KeyArena (8,384); Seattle, WA
NCAA Women's Tournament
03/18/2017*; 3:30 pm, ESPN2	(10 B)	vs. (7 B) Temple; First Round	W 71–70	21–13	Cameron Indoor Stadium; Durham, NC
03/20/2017*; 3:30 pm, ESPN2	(10 B)	at (2 B) No. 9 Duke; Second Round	W 74–65	22–13	Cameron Indoor Stadium (1,620); Durham, NC
03/25/2017*; 8:30 am, ESPN	(10 B)	vs. (3 B) No. 4 Maryland; Sweet Sixteen	W 77–63	23–13	Webster Bank Arena; Bridgeport, CT
03/27/2017*; 4:00 pm, ESPN	(10 B)	vs. (1 B) No. 1 Connecticut; Elite Eight	L 52–90	23–14	Webster Bank Arena (8,978); Bridgeport, CT
*Non-conference game. ^{#}Rankings from AP Poll. (#) Tournament seedings in parentheses. B=Bridgeport Region. All times are in Pacific Time.

== Rankings ==
2016–17 NCAA Division I women's basketball rankings

Regular season polls
Poll	Pre- Season	Week 2	Week 3	Week 4	Week 5	Week 6	Week 7	Week 8	Week 9	Week 10	Week 11	Week 12	Week 13	Week 14	Week 15	Week 16	Week 17	Week 18	Week 19	Final
AP	RV	RV	NR	RV	RV	25	RV	RV	RV	NR	NR	RV	RV	NR	RV	NR	NR	NR	NR	N/A
Coaches	RV	NR	NR	RV	RV	RV	RV	RV	NR	NR	NR	NR	NR	NR	RV	NR	NR	NR	RV	16

Legend
	Increase in ranking
	Decrease in ranking
	Not ranked previous week
(RV)	Received Votes

== See also ==
2016–17 Oregon Ducks men's basketball team
