= 2016–17 USC Trojans women's basketball team =

Intercollegiate basketball season

2016–17 USC Trojans women's basketball

Great Alaska Shootout Champions
- Conference: Pac-12 Conference
- Record: 14–16 (5–13 Pac-12)
- Head coach: Cynthia Cooper-Dyke (4th season)
- Assistant coaches: Beth Burns; Jualeah Woods; Taja Edwards
- Home arena: Galen Center

2016–17 Pac-12 Conference women's basketball standings
	Conf.				Overall
Team	W		L	PCT	W		L	PCT
No. 8 Oregon State	16	–	2	.889	31	–	5	.861
No. 6 Stanford †	15	–	3	.833	32	–	6	.842
No. 12 Washington	15	–	3	.833	29	–	6	.829
No. 15 UCLA	13	–	5	.722	25	–	9	.735
Arizona State	9	–	9	.500	20	–	13	.606
Oregon	8	–	10	.444	23	–	14	.622
California	6	–	12	.333	20	–	14	.588
Washington State	6	–	12	.333	16	–	20	.444
Colorado	5	–	13	.278	17	–	16	.515
Utah	5	–	13	.278	16	–	15	.516
USC	5	–	13	.278	14	–	16	.467
Arizona	5	–	13	.278	14	–	16	.467
† 2017 Pac-12 tournament winner As of March 31, 2017; Rankings from AP poll

The 2016–17 USC Trojans women's basketball team represented University of Southern California during the 2016–17 NCAA Division I women's basketball season. The Trojans, led by fourth year head coach Cynthia Cooper-Dyke, played their home games at the Galen Center and were members of the Pac-12 Conference. They finished the season 14–16, 5–13 in Pac-12 play, to finish in a four-way tie for ninth place. They lost in the first round Pac-12 women's basketball tournament to California.

On March 3, Cynthia Cooper-Duke resigned. She finished at USC with a four-year record of 70–57.

== Roster ==
2016–17 USC Trojans women's basketball team
Players
Coaches

Pos.	#	Name	Height	Year	Previous school	Hometown
G	1	Jordan Adams	6 ft 1 in (1.85 m)	RS Sr	Mater Dei HS	Irvine, CA
G	3	Minyon Moore	5 ft 8 in (1.73 m)	Fr	Salesian HS	Rodeo, CA
C	4	Ivana Jakubcova	6 ft 6 in (1.98 m)	Sr	Kentucky	Bratislava, Slovakia
F	5	Ja'Tavia Tapley	6 ft 4 in (1.93 m)	Fr	University Christian HS	Jacksonville, FL
G	10	Courtney Jaco	5 ft 8 in (1.73 m)	Sr	Windward School	Compton, CA
F	13	Marguerite Effa	6 ft 3 in (1.91 m)	So	Fairfax	Los Angeles, CA
G	14	Sadie Edwards	5 ft 10 in (1.78 m)	Jr	Blair Academy; Connecticut	Meriden, CT
G	21	Aliyah Mazyck	5 ft 9 in (1.75 m)	So	Myers Park HS	Charlotte, NC
G	22	Valerie Higgins	6 ft 0 in (1.83 m)	Fr	Chaminade College Prep	Granada Hills, CA
F	23	Asiah Jones	6 ft 3 in (1.91 m)	Fr	Woodmont HS	Piedmont, SC
F	25	Alexis Lloyd	5 ft 10 in (1.78 m)	RS Sr	Whitney Young HS; Virginia Tech	Chicago, IL
G	30	Candela Abejon	6 ft 1 in (1.85 m)	So	Univ. de Ovideo	Asturias, Spain
F	32	Dani Milisic	6 ft 3 in (1.91 m)	RS Fr	Blacktown Girls HS	Sydney, Australia
F	35	Kristen Simon	6 ft 1 in (1.85 m)	Jr	Windward School	Gardena, CA

Head coach

- Cynthia Cooper-Dyke (USC)

Assistant coach(es)

- Beth Burns (Ohio State)
- Jualeah Woods (USC)
- Taja Edwards (Fresno State)

Legend

- (C) Team captain
- (S) Suspended
- (I) Ineligible
- (W) Walk-on
- Injured
- Current redshirt

Roster

== Schedule ==
Date time, TV	Rank^{#}	Opponent^{#}	Result	Record	Site (attendance) city, state
Exhibition
11/04/2016*; 6:00 pm		Cal State Los Angeles	W 85–39		Galen Center; Los Angeles, CA
Non-conference regular season
11/11/2016*; 5:00 pm		Hawaii	W 76–44	1–0	Galen Center (611); Los Angeles, CA
11/16/2016*; 7:00 pm		UC Riverside	W 67–49	2–0	Galen Center (427); Los Angeles, CA
11/19/2016*; 4:00 pm		at UNLV	L 66–77	2–1	Thomas & Mack Center (1,301); Paradise, NV
11/22/2016*; 6:30 pm		vs. Missouri State; Great Alaska Shootout semifinals	W 89–67	3–1	Alaska Airlines Center (2,032); Anchorage, AK
11/23/2016*; 5:30 pm		vs. Portland; Great Alaska Shootout championship	W 67–54	4–1	Alaska Airlines Center (2,030); Anchorage, AK
11/27/2016*; 4:00 pm		Long Beach State	W 82–74	5–1	Galen Center (606); Los Angeles, CA
11/30/2016*; 9:00 am		at No. 25 Texas A&M	W 66–62	6–1	Reed Arena (7,488); College Station, TX
12/03/2016*; 7:35 pm		at Sacramento State	W 111–95	7–1	Hornets Nest (954); Sacramento, CA
12/16/2016*; 6:00 pm		Grambling State; Women of Troy Classic semifinals	W 75–64	8–1	Galen Center (717); Los Angeles, CA
12/18/2016*; 1:00 pm		No. 5 Mississippi State; Women of Troy Classic championship	L 72–76	8–2	Galen Center (1,213); Los Angeles, CA
12/21/2016*; 6:00 pm		at UC Irvine	W 83–45	9–2	Bren Events Center (262); Irvine, CA
Pac-12 regular season
12/30/2016; 6:00 pm		No. 20 Colorado	W 79–54	10–2 (1–0)	Galen Center (616); Los Angeles, CA
01/01/2017; 12:00 pm		Utah	L 53–58	10–3 (1–1)	Galen Center (592); Los Angeles, CA
01/06/2017; 8:00 pm, P12N		at No. 12 Washington	L 67–77	10–4 (1–2)	Alaska Airlines Arena (2,377); Seattle, WA
01/08/2017; 12:00 pm, P12N		at Washington State	L 57–74	10–5 (1–3)	Beasley Coliseum (603); Pullman, WA
01/13/2017; 8:00 pm, P12N		Oregon	L 53–59	10–6 (1–4)	Galen Center (954); Los Angeles, CA
01/15/2017; 3:00 pm, P12N		No. 10 Oregon State	L 60–74	10–7 (1–5)	Galen Center (1,476); Los Angeles, CA
01/18/2017; 8:00 pm, P12N		No. 13 UCLA; Rivalry	L 59–74	10–8 (1–6)	Galen Center (949); Los Angeles, CA
01/22/2017; 5:00 pm, P12N		at No. 13 UCLA; Rivalry	L 67–71	10–9 (1–7)	Pauley Pavilion (4,415); Los Angeles, CA
01/27/2017; 7:00 pm		Arizona	W 58–54	11–9 (2–7)	Galen Center (667); Los Angeles, CA
01/27/2017; 3:00 pm, P12N		No. 16 Arizona State	W 65–50	12–9 (3–7)	Galen Center (2,589); Los Angeles, CA
02/03/2017; 6:00 pm, P12N		at No. 8 Stanford	L 42–58	12–10 (3–8)	Maples Pavilion (4,490); Stanford, CA
02/05/2017; 10:30 am		at California	L 56–63	12–11 (3–9)	Haas Pavilion (3,052); Berkeley, CA
02/10/2017; 8:00 pm, P12N		at No. 9 Oregon State	W 70–50	13–11 (4–9)	Gill Coliseum (4,286); Corvallis, OR
02/12/2017; 11:00 am, P12N		at Oregon	L 50–73	13–12 (4–10)	Matthew Knight Arena (2,750); Eugene, OR
02/17/2017; 6:00 pm, P12N		Washington State	W 80–64	14–12 (5–10)	Galen Center (910); Los Angeles, CA
02/19/2017; 3:00 pm, P12N		No. 9 Washington	L 74–87	14–13 (5–11)	Galen Center (1,513); Los Angeles, CA
02/24/2017; 7:00 pm, P12N		at Arizona State	L 62–69	14–14 (5–12)	Wells Fargo Arena (2,248); Tempe, AZ
02/26/2017; 1:00 pm		at Arizona	L 62–67	14–15 (5–13)	McKale Center (1,640); Tucson, AZ
Pac-12 women's tournament
03/02/2017; 11:30 am, P12N	(9)	vs. (8) California; First Round	L 58–71	14–16	KeyArena; Seattle, WA
*Non-conference game. ^{#}Rankings from AP poll. (#) Tournament seedings in parentheses. All times are in Pacific Time.

== Rankings ==
Regular season polls
Poll	Pre- season	Week 2	Week 3	Week 4	Week 5	Week 6	Week 7	Week 8	Week 9	Week 10	Week 11	Week 12	Week 13	Week 14	Week 15	Week 16	Week 17	Week 18	Week 19	Final
AP	NR	NR	NR	NR	RV	RV	RV	RV	RV	RV	NR	NR	NR	NR						N/A
Coaches	NR	NR	NR	NR	NR	NR	NR	NR	NR	NR	NR	NR	NR	NR						

Legend
	Increase in ranking
	Decrease in ranking
	Not ranked previous week
(RV)	Received votes

== See also ==
- 2016–17 USC Trojans men's basketball team

== Notes ==
- March 3, 2017 – Cynthia Cooper-Dyke resigns after four years as head coach.
