= 2016–17 Washington State Cougars women's basketball team =

Intercollegiate basketball season

2016–17 Washington State Cougars women's basketball

WNIT, Semifinals
- Conference: Pac-12 Conference
- Record: 16–20 (6–12 Pac-12)
- Head coach: June Daugherty (10th season)
- Assistant coaches: Mike Daugherty; Ashley Grover; Rod Jensen
- Home arena: Beasley Coliseum

2016–17 Pac-12 Conference women's basketball standings
	Conf.				Overall
Team	W		L	PCT	W		L	PCT
No. 8 Oregon State	16	–	2	.889	31	–	5	.861
No. 6 Stanford †	15	–	3	.833	32	–	6	.842
No. 12 Washington	15	–	3	.833	29	–	6	.829
No. 15 UCLA	13	–	5	.722	25	–	9	.735
Arizona State	9	–	9	.500	20	–	13	.606
Oregon	8	–	10	.444	23	–	14	.622
California	6	–	12	.333	20	–	14	.588
Washington State	6	–	12	.333	16	–	20	.444
Colorado	5	–	13	.278	17	–	16	.515
Utah	5	–	13	.278	16	–	15	.516
USC	5	–	13	.278	14	–	16	.467
Arizona	5	–	13	.278	14	–	16	.467
† 2017 Pac-12 tournament winner As of March 31, 2017; Rankings from AP poll

The 2016–17 Washington State Cougars women's basketball team represented Washington State University during the 2016–17 NCAA Division I women's basketball season. The Cougars, led by tenth-year head coach June Daugherty, played their home games at the Beasley Coliseum and were members of the Pac-12 Conference. They finished the season 16–20, 6–12 in the Pac-12 to finish in a tie for seventh place. They advanced to the quarterfinals of the Pac-12 women's tournament, where they lost to Stanford. They were invited to the Women's National Invitation Tournament, where they defeated BYU, Wyoming and UC Davis in the first, second and third rounds, and Iowa in the quarterfinals, before losing to Georgia Tech in the semifinals.

== Roster ==
2016–17 Washington State Cougars women's basketball team
Players
Coaches

Pos.	#	Name	Height	Year	Previous school	Hometown
G	1	Caila Hailey	5 ft 10 in (1.78 m)	Jr	Serra HS	Inglewood, CA
G	2	Krystle McKenzie	5 ft 8 in (1.73 m)	RS So	XXXX	Brisbane, Australia
F	4	Louise Brown	6 ft 1 in (1.85 m)	Jr	XXXX	Melbourne, Australia
F	5	Kayla Washington	6 ft 0 in (1.83 m)	Fr	Cajon HS	San Bernardino, CA
G	10	Johanna Muzet	6 ft 0 in (1.83 m)	Fr	Lyon Basket	Lyon, France
G	11	Chanelle Molina	5 ft 9 in (1.75 m)	Fr	Konawaena HS	Kailua, HI
G	12	Cameron Fernandez	6 ft 0 in (1.83 m)	Fr	Lahainaluna HS	Makawao, HI
F	15	Ivana Kmetovska	6 ft 3 in (1.91 m)	Sr	Orce Nikolov	Skopeje, Macedonia
C	20	Maria Kostourkova	6 ft 4 in (1.93 m)	So	E.S.P.J.A.L.	Lisbon, Portugal
F	21	Nike McClure	6 ft 3 in (1.91 m)	RS So	W. F. West HS	Tenino, WA
G	22	Pinelopi Pavlopoulou	5 ft 8 in (1.73 m)	Jr	ACS Athens	Athens, Greece
G	23	Alexys Swedlund	5 ft 11 in (1.8 m)	So	St. Thomas More HS	Rapid City, SD
F	41	Jovana Subasic	6 ft 1 in (1.85 m)	Fr	XXXX	Šabac, Serbia
F	45	Borislava Hristova	6 ft 0 in (1.83 m)	So	Georgi Benkovski	Varna, Bulgaria

Head coach

- June Daugherty (Ohio State)

Assistant coach(es)

- Mike Daugherty (Ohio State)
- Ashley Grover (Washington State)
- Rod Jensen (Redlands)

Legend

- (C) Team captain
- (S) Suspended
- (I) Ineligible
- (W) Walk-on
- Injured
- Current redshirt

Roster

== Schedule ==
Date time, TV	Rank^{#}	Opponent^{#}	Result	Record	Site (attendance) city, state
Exhibition
11/06/2016*; 2:00 pm		Alaska Anchorage	W 81–73		Beasley Coliseum; Pullman, WA
Non-conference regular season
11/11/2016*; 7:00 pm		Loyola Marymount	W 92–45	1–0	Beasley Coliseum (2,078); Pullman, WA
11/13/2016*; 1:00 pm		Saint Mary's	W 85–69	2–0	Beasley Coliseum (439); Pullman, WA
11/18/2016*; 7:00 pm		San Francisco	W 73–35	3–0	Beasley Coliseum (419); Pullman, WA
11/20/2016*; 12:00 pm, P12N		Oklahoma State	L 72–79 ^{OT}	3–1	Beasley Coliseum (542); Pullman, WA
11/25/2016*; 6:00 pm		vs. Nebraska; South Point Thanksgiving Shootout	W 79–65	4–1	South Point Arena (400); Enterprise, NV
11/26/2016*; 3:30 pm		vs. No. 6 Maryland; South Point Thanksgiving Shootout	L 69–79	4–2	South Point Arena; Enterprise, NV
12/02/2016*; 7:00 pm		San Diego	W 83–73	5–2	Beasley Coliseum (562); Pullman, WA
12/04/2016*; 2:00 pm		Boise State	L 73–77	5–3	Beasley Coliseum (699); Pullman, WA
12/08/2016*; 6:00 pm		at Gonzaga	L 61–79	5–4	McCarthey Athletic Center (5,724); Spokane, WA
12/18/2016*; 12:00 pm		at Saint Louis	L 70–73	5–5	Chaifetz Arena (604); St. Louis, MO
12/21/2016*; 9:00 am		at No. 18 Kentucky	L 67–69	5–6	Memorial Coliseum (4,875); Lexington, KY
Pac-12 regular season
12/27/2016; 7:00 pm, P12N		at No. 9 Washington	L 63–94	5–7 (0–1)	Alaska Airlines Arena (4,635); Seattle, WA
12/30/2016; 4:00 pm		at No. 22 Oregon State	L 58–80	5–8 (0–2)	Gill Coliseum (3,429); Corvallis, OR
01/01/2017; 2:00 pm		at Oregon	W 75–59	6–8 (1–2)	Matthew Knight Arena (2,402); Eugene, OR
01/06/2017; 6:00 pm, P12N		No. 9 UCLA	W 82–73	7–8 (2–2)	Beasley Coliseum (820); Pullman, WA
01/08/2017; 12:00 pm, P12N		USC	W 74–57	8–8 (3–2)	Beasley Coliseum (603); Pullman, WA
01/13/2017; 10:00 am		at No. 19 Arizona State	L 49–68	8–9 (3–3)	Wells Fargo Arena (3,725); Tempe, AZ
01/15/2017; 10:00 am, P12N		at Arizona	L 55–56	8–10 (3–4)	McKale Center (1,425); Tucson, AZ
01/22/2017; 1:00 pm, P12N		No. 8 Washington	L 44–87	8–11 (3–5)	Beasley Coliseum (987); Pullman, WA
02/27/2017; 8:00 pm, P12N		No. 10 Stanford	L 54–76	8–12 (3–6)	Beasley Coliseum (626); Pullman, WA
02/29/2017; 1:00 pm		California	W 84–79	9–12 (4–6)	Beasley Coliseum (639); Pullman, WA
02/03/2017; 5:00 pm, P12N		at Colorado	L 58–70	9–13 (4–7)	Coors Events Center (1,907); Boulder, CO
02/05/2017; 11:00 am		at Utah	W 61–55	10–13 (5–7)	Jon M. Huntsman Center (1,152); Salt Lake City, UT
02/10/2017; 7:00 pm		No. 23 Arizona State	L 58–61	10–14 (5–8)	Beasley Coliseum (779); Pullman, WA
02/15/2017; 11:00 am, P12N		Arizona	L 62–70	10–15 (5–9)	Beasley Coliseum (802); Pullman, WA
02/17/2017; 6:00 pm, P12N		at USC	L 64–80	10–16 (5–10)	Galen Center (910); Los Angeles, CA
02/19/2017; 11:00 am, P12N		at No. 18 UCLA	L 48–67	10–17 (5–11)	Pauley Pavilion (1,958); Los Angeles, CA
02/23/2017; 6:00 pm, P12N		Utah	L 57–74	10–18 (5–12)	Beasley Coliseum (611); Pullman, WA
02/25/2017; 1:00 pm		Colorado	W 67–56	11–18 (6–12)	Beasley Coliseum (712); Pullman, WA
Pac-12 Women's Tournament
03/02/2017; 6:00 pm, P12N	(7)	vs. (10) Colorado; First Round	W 79–78	12–18	KeyArena; Seattle, WA
03/03/2017; 6:00 pm, P12N	(7)	vs. (2) No. 10 Stanford; Quarterfinals	L 36–66	12–19	KeyArena; Seattle, WA
WNIT
03/16/2017*; 7:00 pm		at BYU; First Round	W 72–64	13–19	Marriott Center (610); Provo, UT
03/18/2017*; 2:00 pm		at Wyoming; Second Round	W 68–67 ^{OT}	14–19	Arena-Auditorium (1,871); Laramie, WY
03/23/2017*; 7:00 pm		UC Davis; Third Round	W 71–62	15–19	Beasley Coliseum (1,456); Pullman, WA
03/26/2017*; 2:00 pm		at Iowa; Quarterfinals	W 74–66	16–19	Carver–Hawkeye Arena (5,146); Iowa City, IA
03/29/2017*; 7:00 pm		at Georgia Tech; Semifinals	L 61–69	16–20	McCamish Pavilion (1,106); Atlanta, GA
*Non-conference game. ^{#}Rankings from AP Poll. (#) Tournament seedings in parentheses. All times are in Pacific Time.

== Rankings ==
Regular season polls
Poll	Pre- season	Week 2	Week 3	Week 4	Week 5	Week 6	Week 7	Week 8	Week 9	Week 10	Week 11	Week 12	Week 13	Week 14	Week 15	Week 16	Week 17	Week 18	Final
AP																			
Coaches																			

Legend
	Increase in ranking
	Decrease in ranking
	Not ranked previous week
(RV)	Received votes

== See also ==
- 2016–17 Washington State Cougars men's basketball team
