= 2016–17 Arizona State Sun Devils women's basketball team =

Intercollegiate basketball season

2016–17 Arizona State Sun Devils women's basketball

ASU Classic Champions

NCAA Women's Tournament, second round
- Conference: Pac-12 Conference
- Record: 20–13 (9–9 Pac-12)
- Head coach: Charli Turner Thorne (20th season)
- Assistant coaches: Amanda Levens; Meg Sanders; Jackie Moore
- Home arena: Wells Fargo Arena

2016–17 Pac-12 Conference women's basketball standings
	Conf.				Overall
Team	W		L	PCT	W		L	PCT
No. 8 Oregon State	16	–	2	.889	31	–	5	.861
No. 6 Stanford †	15	–	3	.833	32	–	6	.842
No. 12 Washington	15	–	3	.833	29	–	6	.829
No. 15 UCLA	13	–	5	.722	25	–	9	.735
Arizona State	9	–	9	.500	20	–	13	.606
Oregon	8	–	10	.444	23	–	14	.622
California	6	–	12	.333	20	–	14	.588
Washington State	6	–	12	.333	16	–	20	.444
Colorado	5	–	13	.278	17	–	16	.515
Utah	5	–	13	.278	16	–	15	.516
USC	5	–	13	.278	14	–	16	.467
Arizona	5	–	13	.278	14	–	16	.467
† 2017 Pac-12 tournament winner As of March 31, 2017; Rankings from AP poll

The 2016–17 Arizona State Sun Devils women's basketball team represented Arizona State University during the 2016–17 NCAA Division I women's basketball season. The Sun Devils, led by 20th-year head coach Charli Turner Thorne, played their games at the Wells Fargo Arena and were members of the Pac-12 Conference. They finished the season 20–13, 9–9 in Pac-12 play to finish in fifth place. They advanced to the quarterfinals of the Pac-12 women's tournament, where they lost to UCLA. They received an at-large bid to the NCAA women's tournament, where they defeated Michigan State in the first round before losing to South Carolina in the second round.

== Roster ==
2016–17 Arizona State Sun Devils women's basketball team
Players
Coaches

Pos.	#	Name	Height	Year	Previous school	Hometown
G	1	Reili Richardson	5 ft 9 in (1.75 m)	Fr	Brea Olinda	Brea, CA
G	2	Courtney Ekmark (I) (redshirt)	6 ft 0 in (1.83 m)	Jr	St. Mary's; Connecticut	Arcadia, AZ
G	3	Sabrina Haines	5 ft 10 in (1.78 m)	So	Desert Vista	Phoenix, AZ
G	4	Kiara Russell	5 ft 8 in (1.73 m)	Fr	Osseo	Minneapolis, MN
G	11	Robbi Ryan	5 ft 8 in (1.73 m)	Fr	Sheridan	Sheridan, WY
G	13	Sydney Goodson	5 ft 8 in (1.73 m)	Fr	Liberty Christian	Argyle, TX
F	21	Sophie Brunner	6 ft 1 in (1.85 m)	Sr	Aquin	Freeport, IL
C	22	Quinn Dornstauder	6 ft 4 in (1.93 m)	Sr	LeBoldus	Regina, SK
F	24	Kelsey Moos	6 ft 0 in (1.83 m)	Sr	Reardan	Edwall, WA
C	33	Charnea Johnson-Chapman	6 ft 3 in (1.91 m)	So	Canyon Springs	Moreno Valley, CA
F	42	Kianna Ibis	6 ft 1 in (1.85 m)	So	Benson	Omaha, NE
F	44	Sara Hattis	6 ft 4 in (1.93 m)	Sr	Cleveland; Texas	Rio Rancho, NM
G	50	Armani Hawkins	5 ft 10 in (1.78 m)	So	Mountain View	Mesa, AZ
F	52	Jamie Ruden	6 ft 1 in (1.85 m)	Fr	John Marshall	Rochester, MN

Head coach

- Charli Turner Thorne (Stanford)

Assistant coach(es)

- Amanda Levens (Arizona State)
- Meg Sanders (Fresno State)
- Jackie Moore (Armstrong State)

Legend

- (C) Team captain
- (S) Suspended
- (I) Ineligible
- (W) Walk-on
- Injured
- Current redshirt

Roster

== Schedule ==
Date time, TV	Rank^{#}	Opponent^{#}	Result	Record	Site (attendance) city, state
Non-conference regular season
11/11/2016*; 4:00 pm	No. 18	Illinois State	W 76–40	1–0	Wells Fargo Arena (1,748); Tempe, AZ
11/13/2016*; 2:00 pm	No. 18	San Jose State	W 82–37	2–0	Wells Fargo Arena (1,380); Tempe, AZ
11/19/2016*; 1:00 pm	No. 18	at Marquette	L 63–75	2–1	Al McGuire Center (2,109); Milwaukee, WI
11/25/2016*; 2:00 pm	No. 23	vs. No. 6 Maryland; South Point Thanksgiving Shootout	L 42–83	2–2	South Point Arena; Enterprise, NV
11/26/2016*; 2:00 pm	No. 23	vs. St. John's; South Point Thanksgiving Shootout	W 54–41	3–2	South Point Arena; Enterprise, NV
12/03/2016*; 12:00 pm		Boston University; ASU Classic semifinals	W 71–42	4–2	Wells Fargo Arena (1,428); Tempe, AZ
12/04/2016*; 2:00 pm		No. 19 Florida; ASU Classic championship	W 69–63	5–2	Wells Fargo Arena (1,773); Tempe, AZ
12/11/2016*; 11:00 am, SECN		at No. 15 Kentucky	W 73–71 ^{OT}	6–2	Rupp Arena (13,225); Lexington, KY
12/13/2016*; 5:30 pm	No. 23	at Middle Tennessee	W 69–48	7–2	Murphy Center (2,717); Murfreesboro, TN
12/17/2016*; 2:00 pm	No. 23	Oral Roberts	W 79–52	8–2	Wells Fargo Arena (2,015); Tempe, AZ
12/21/2016*; 5:00 pm	No. 21	Holy Cross	W 63–33	9–2	Wells Fargo Arena (1,659); Tempe, AZ
Pac-12 regular season
12/30/2016; 4:00 pm, P12N	No. 18	No. 13 Stanford	L 57–64	9–3 (0–1)	Wells Fargo Arena (2,556); Tempe, AZ
01/01/2017; 3:00 pm, P12N	No. 18	No. 21 California	W 72–62	10–3 (1–1)	Wells Fargo Arena (1,682); Tempe, AZ
01/06/2017; 7:00 pm, P12N	No. 19	at Utah	W 66–44	11–3 (2–1)	Jon M. Huntsman Center (1,662); Salt Lake City, UT
01/08/2017; 4:00 pm, P12N	No. 19	at Colorado	W 71–52	12–3 (3–1)	Coors Events Center (1,886); Boulder, CO
01/13/2017; 11:00 am	No. 19	Washington State	W 68–49	13–3 (4–1)	Wells Fargo Arena (3,725); Tempe, AZ
01/15/2017; 6:00 pm, P12N	No. 19	No. 8 Washington	L 54–65	13–4 (4–2)	Wells Fargo Arena (2,314); Tempe, AZ
01/20/2017; 9:00 pm, P12N	No. 18	at California	W 54–45	14–4 (5–2)	Haas Pavilion (1,622); Berkeley, CA
01/22/2016; 4:00 pm, P12N	No. 18	at No. 10 Stanford	L 56–66	14–5 (5–3)	Maples Pavilion (3,280); Stanford, CA
01/27/2017; 9:00 pm, P12N	No. 16	at No. 13 UCLA	L 60–69	14–6 (5–4)	Pauley Pavilion (1,493); Los Angeles, CA
01/29/2017; 9:00 pm, P12N	No. 16	at USC	L 50–65	14–7 (5–5)	Galen Center (2,589); Los Angeles, CA
02/03/2017; 8:00 pm, P12N	No. 23	No. 11 Oregon State	L 45–54	14–8 (5–6)	Wells Fargo Arena (4,025); Tempe, AZ
02/05/2017; 12:00 pm, P12N	No. 23	Oregon	W 68–63	15–8 (6–6)	Wells Fargo Arena (1,986); Tempe, AZ
02/10/2017; 8:00 pm	No. 23	at Washington State	W 61–58	16–8 (7–6)	Beasley Coliseum (779); Pullman, WA
02/12/2017; 6:00 pm, P12N	No. 23	at No. 10 Washington	L 57–70	16–9 (7–7)	Alaska Airlines Arena (6,248); Seattle, WA
02/17/2017; 7:00 pm, P12N		at Arizona	L 58–62	16–10 (7–8)	McKale Center (2,085); Tucson, AZ
02/19/2017; 4:00 pm, P12N		Arizona	W 67–54	17–10 (8–8)	Wells Fargo Arena (3,772); Tempe, AZ
02/24/2017; 8:00 pm, P12N		USC	W 69–62	18–10 (9–8)	Wells Fargo Arena (2,248); Tempe, AZ
02/26/2017; 12:00 pm, P12N		No. 15 UCLA	L 52–55	18–11 (9–9)	Wells Fargo Arena (2,136); Tempe, AZ
Pac-12 Women's Tournament
03/02/2017; 3:00 pm, P12N	(5)	vs. (12) Utah; First Round	W 72–54	19–11	KeyArena (3,061); Seattle, WA
03/03/2017; 3:00 pm, P12N	(5)	vs. (4) No. 15 UCLA; Quarterfinals	L 68–77	19–12	KeyArena (4,659); Seattle, WA
NCAA Women's Tournament
03/17/2017*; 4:30 pm, ESPN2	(8 S)	vs. (9 S) Michigan State; First Round	W 73–61	20–12	Colonial Life Arena (8,215); Columbia, SC
03/19/2017*; 4:00 pm, ESPN	(8 S)	at (1 S) No. 3 South Carolina; Second Round	L 68–71	20–13	Colonial Life Arena (8,276); Columbia, SC
*Non-conference game. ^{#}Rankings from AP Poll. (#) Tournament seedings in parentheses. S=Stockton Region. All times are in Mountain Time.

== Rankings ==
Regular season polls
Poll	Pre- season	Week 2	Week 3	Week 4	Week 5	Week 6	Week 7	Week 8	Week 9	Week 10	Week 11	Week 12	Week 13	Week 14	Week 15	Week 16	Week 17	Week 18	Week 19	Final
AP	18	18	23	RV	RV	23	21т	18	19	19	18	16	23	23	RV	RV	RV	RV	RV	N/A
Coaches	16	16	21	24	23	21	19	19	19	18	19	16	18	21	23	23	25	RV	RV	RV

Legend
	Increase in ranking
	Decrease in ranking
	Not ranked previous week
(RV)	Received votes

== See also ==
- 2016–17 Arizona State Sun Devils men's basketball team
