= 2016–17 Colorado Buffaloes women's basketball team =

Intercollegiate basketball season

2016–17 Colorado Buffaloes women's basketball

Omni Hotels Invitational Champions

WNIT, Third Round
- Conference: Pac-12 Conference
- Record: 17–16 (5–13 Pac-12)
- Head coach: JR Payne (1st season)
- Assistant coaches: Toriano Towns; Jeff Cammon; Shandrika Lee
- Home arena: Coors Events Center

2016–17 Pac-12 Conference women's basketball standings
	Conf.				Overall
Team	W		L	PCT	W		L	PCT
No. 8 Oregon State	16	–	2	.889	31	–	5	.861
No. 6 Stanford †	15	–	3	.833	32	–	6	.842
No. 12 Washington	15	–	3	.833	29	–	6	.829
No. 15 UCLA	13	–	5	.722	25	–	9	.735
Arizona State	9	–	9	.500	20	–	13	.606
Oregon	8	–	10	.444	23	–	14	.622
California	6	–	12	.333	20	–	14	.588
Washington State	6	–	12	.333	16	–	20	.444
Colorado	5	–	13	.278	17	–	16	.515
Utah	5	–	13	.278	16	–	15	.516
USC	5	–	13	.278	14	–	16	.467
Arizona	5	–	13	.278	14	–	16	.467
† 2017 Pac-12 tournament winner As of March 31, 2017; Rankings from AP poll

The 2016–17 Colorado Buffaloes women's basketball team represented University of Colorado Boulder during the 2016–17 NCAA Division I women's basketball season. The Buffaloes, led by first year head coach JR Payne, played their home games at the Coors Events Center and were a member of the Pac-12 Conference. They finished the season 17–16, 5–13 in Pac-12 play to finish in a 4 way tie for ninth place. They lost in the first round of the Pac-12 women's tournament to Washington State. They were invited to the Women's National Invitation Tournament, where they defeated UNLV and South Dakota State in the first and second rounds before losing to Iowa in the third round.

== Roster ==
2016–17 Colorado Buffaloes women's basketball team
Players
Coaches

Pos.	#	Name	Height	Year	Previous school	Hometown
G	0	Quinessa Caylao-Do	5 ft 8 in (1.73 m)	Fr	Bellevue	Tacoma, WA
F	1	Makenzie Ellis	6 ft 2 in (1.88 m)	So	Booker T. Washington	Tulsa, OK
G	2	Alexis Robinson	5 ft 10 in (1.78 m)	So	Paul G. Blazer	Ashland, KY
C	3	Bri Watts	6 ft 2 in (1.88 m)	Sr	Clovis West	Fresno, CA
F	11	Eleanor Jones	6 ft 2 in (1.88 m)	Fr	Charnwood College	Salisbury, England
G	12	Ariana Freeman	5 ft 9 in (1.75 m)	RS So	Paul VI Catholic; Louisville	Manassas, VA
G	13	Brecca Thomas	5 ft 5 in (1.65 m)	Jr	The Kinkaid School	Stafford, TX
G	14	Kennedy Leonard	5 ft 8 in (1.73 m)	So	Carroll	Southlake, TX
C	15	Zoe Correal	6 ft 4 in (1.93 m)	Jr	Salesian	San Francisco, CA
F	21	Monica Burich	6 ft 2 in (1.88 m)	RS Fr	Roseville	Roseville, MN
G/F	22	Haley Smith	6 ft 1 in (1.85 m)	Sr	Skyline	Sammamish, WA
G/F	24	Lauren Huggins	6 ft 2 in (1.88 m)	Sr	Heritage	Littleton, CO
F	31	Zoe Beard-Fails	6 ft 1 in (1.85 m)	Sr	Georgetown Day School	Herndon, VA

Head coach

- JR Payne (Saint Mary's)

Assistant coach(es)

- Toriano Towns (Saint Mary's)
- Jeff Cammon (Alcorn State)
- Shandrika Lee (Pepperdine)

Legend

- (C) Team captain
- (S) Suspended
- (I) Ineligible
- (W) Walk-on
- Injured
- Current redshirt

Roster

== Schedule ==
Date time, TV	Rank^{#}	Opponent^{#}	Result	Record	Site (attendance) city, state
Non-conference regular season
11/11/2016*; 7:00 pm		at Northern Colorado	W 83–62	1–0	Bank of Colorado Arena (1,071); Greeley, CO
11/13/2016*; 2:00 pm		Air Force	W 95–68	2–0	Coors Events Center (1,845); Boulder, CO
11/19/2016*; 7:00 pm		No. 15 Kentucky	W 79–69	3–0	Coors Events Center (1,507); Boulder, CO
11/22/2016*; 4:00 pm		at North Dakota State	W 76–59	4–0	Scheels Center (683); Fargo, ND
11/25/2016*; 7:30 pm		St. Francis Brooklyn; Omni Hotels Invitational semifinals	W 81–54	5–0	Coors Events Center (1,473); Boulder, CO
11/26/2016*; 11:00 am		SMU; Omni Hotels Invitational championship	W 67–50	6–0	Coors Events Center (1,495); Boulder, CO
12/01/2016*; 7:00 pm	No. 21	Southeastern Louisiana	W 112–54	7–0	Coors Events Center (1,195); Boulder, CO
12/03/2016*; 6:00 pm	No. 21	Idaho State	W 85–56	8–0	Coors Events Center (1,602); Boulder, CO
12/08/2016*; 7:00 pm, P12N	No. 18	Colorado State	W 74–56	9–0	Coors Events Center (1,723); Boulder, CO
12/17/2016*; 2:00 pm	No. 15	at Mississippi Valley State	W 76–64	10–0	Harrison HPER Complex (789); Itta Bena, MS
12/21/2016*; 7:00 pm	No. 15	Wyoming	L 75–82	10–1	Coors Events Center (1,982); Boulder, CO
Pac-12 regular season
12/30/2016; 7:00 pm	No. 20	at USC	L 54–79	10–2 (0–1)	Galen Center (616); Los Angeles, CA
01/01/2017; 3:00 pm	No. 20	at No. 10 UCLA	L 74–87	10–3 (0–2)	Pauley Pavilion (1,354); Los Angeles, CA
01/06/2017; 8:00 pm		Arizona	W 65–56	11–3 (1–2)	Coors Events Center (2,158); Boulder, CO
01/08/2017; 4:00 pm, P12N		No. 19 Arizona State	L 52–71	11–4 (1–3)	Coors Events Center (1,886); Boulder, CO
01/13/2017; 8:00 pm		No. 24 California	L 53–65	11–5 (1–4)	Coors Events Center (1,571); Boulder, CO
01/15/2017; 4:00 pm, P12N		No. 13 Stanford	L 70–84	11–6 (1–5)	Coors Events Center (2,126); Boulder, CO
01/20/2017; 7:00 pm, P12N		at Oregon	L 66–71	11–7 (1–6)	Matthew Knight Arena (2,260); Eugene, OR
01/22/2017; 4:00 pm, P12N		at No. 11 Oregon State	L 57–81	11–8 (1–7)	Gill Coliseum (3,927); Corvallis, OR
01/25/2017; 7:00 pm, P12N		Utah	W 54–49	12–8 (2–7)	Coors Events Center (1,457); Boulder, CO
01/28/2017; 12:30 pm, P12N		at Utah	L 53–58	12–9 (2–8)	Jon M. Huntsman Center (1,449); Salt Lake City, UT
02/03/2017; 6:00 pm, P12N		Washington State	W 70–58	13–9 (3–8)	Coors Events Center (1,907); Boulder, CO
02/05/2017; 12:00 pm, P12N		No. 10 Washington	L 75–79	13–10 (3–9)	Coors Events Center (1,818); Boulder, CO
02/10/2017; 9:00 pm, P12N		at No. 8 Stanford	L 51–64	13–11 (3–10)	Maples Pavilion (2,546); Stanford, CA
02/12/2017; 4:00 pm, P12N		at California	W 64–59	14–11 (4–10)	Haas Pavilion (3,024); Berkeley, CA
02/17/2017; 8:00 pm, P12N		No. 11 Oregon State	L 49–54	14–12 (4–11)	Coors Events Center (1,751); Boulder, CO
02/19/2017; 12:00 pm, P12N		Oregon	W 76–66	15–12 (5–11)	Coors Events Center (3,988); Boulder, CO
02/23/2017; 9:00 pm, P12N		at No. 11 Washington	L 47–79	15–13 (5–12)	Alaska Airlines Arena (4,448); Seattle, WA
02/25/2017; 2:00 pm		at Washington State	L 56–67	15–14 (5–13)	Beasley Coliseum (712); Pullman, WA
Pac-12 Women's Tournament
03/02/2017; 7:00 pm, P12N	(10)	vs. (7) Washington State; First Round	L 78–79	15–15	KeyArena; Seattle, WA
WNIT
03/16/2017*; 7:00 pm		UNLV; First Round	W 66–52	16–15	Coors Events Center (815); Boulder, CO
03/19/2017*; 1:00 pm, MidcoSN		at South Dakota State; Second Round	W 81–75 ^{OT}	17–15	Frost Arena (2,793); Brookings, SD
03/23/2017*; 6:00 pm		at Iowa; Third Round	L 62–80	17–16	Carver–Hawkeye Arena (3,735); Iowa City, IA
*Non-conference game. ^{#}Rankings from AP Poll. (#) Tournament seedings in parentheses. All times are in Mountain Time.

== Rankings ==
2016–17 NCAA Division I women's basketball rankings

Regular season polls
Poll	Pre- Season	Week 2	Week 3	Week 4	Week 5	Week 6	Week 7	Week 8	Week 9	Week 10	Week 11	Week 12	Week 13	Week 14	Week 15	Week 16	Week 17	Week 18	Week 19	Final
AP	NR	NR	RV	21	18	15	15	20	NR	RV	NR	NR	NR	NR	NR	NR	NR			N/A
Coaches	NR	NR	NR	RV	RV	RV	RV	RV	NR	NR	NR	NR	NR	NR	NR	NR	NR			

Legend
	Increase in ranking
	Decrease in ranking
	Not ranked previous week
(RV)	Received Votes
