= 2016–17 Mississippi State Bulldogs women's basketball team =

Intercollegiate basketball season

2016–17 Mississippi State Bulldogs women's basketball

Maine Tip-Off Tournament champions Rainbow Wahine Shootout champions Women of Troy Classic champions

NCAA tournament, Runner-Up
- Conference: Southeastern Conference

Ranking
- Coaches: No. 2
- AP: No. 7
- Record: 34–5 (13–3 SEC)
- Head coach: Vic Schaefer (5th season)
- Assistant coaches: Johnnie Harris; Dionnah Jackson; Carly Thibault
- Home arena: Humphrey Coliseum

2016–17 SEC women's basketball standings
| | Conf. | | | | Overall |
| Team | W | | L | PCT | W | | L | PCT |
|---|---|---|---|---|---|---|---|---|
| No. 3 South Carolina† | 14 | – | 2 | .875 | 33 | – | 4 | .892 |
| No. 7 Mississippi State | 13 | – | 3 | .813 | 34 | – | 5 | .872 |
| No. 18 Kentucky | 11 | – | 5 | .688 | 22 | – | 11 | .667 |
| No. 25 Missouri | 11 | – | 5 | .688 | 21 | – | 11 | .656 |
| Tennessee | 10 | – | 6 | .625 | 20 | – | 12 | .625 |
| Texas A&M | 9 | – | 7 | .563 | 22 | – | 12 | .647 |
| LSU | 8 | – | 8 | .500 | 20 | – | 12 | .625 |
| Auburn | 7 | – | 9 | .438 | 17 | – | 15 | .531 |
| Georgia | 7 | – | 9 | .438 | 16 | – | 15 | .516 |
| Ole Miss | 6 | – | 10 | .375 | 17 | – | 14 | .548 |
| Alabama | 5 | – | 11 | .313 | 22 | – | 14 | .611 |
| Florida | 5 | – | 11 | .313 | 15 | – | 16 | .484 |
| Vanderbilt | 4 | – | 12 | .250 | 14 | – | 16 | .467 |
| Arkansas | 2 | – | 14 | .125 | 13 | – | 17 | .433 |
† 2017 SEC tournament winner Rankings from AP poll

The 2016–17 Mississippi State Bulldogs women's basketball team represented Mississippi State University during the 2016–17 NCAA Division I women's basketball season. The Bulldogs, led by fifth year head coach Vic Schaefer. They played their home games at Humphrey Coliseum and are members of the Southeastern Conference.

The Bulldogs finished regular season play at 27–3, 13–3 in the SEC, before continuing into the post-season. They advanced to the finals of their conference tournament as the #2 seed, but lost to #1 seed South Carolina. They entered the NCAA Tournament as a #2 seed in the Oklahoma City regional. They beat the #3 seed Washington Huskies team in the regional semifinals to advance to the regional final against #1 seed Baylor. The Bulldogs won in overtime to clinch their first Final Four berth. This victory earned them the distinction of playing an undefeated UConn Huskies team, holder of a 111-game winning streak extending over three seasons. By upsetting the Huskies 66-64 in overtime on a buzzer-beating jumper by Morgan William, they advanced to play South Carolina in the 2017 NCAA Division I Women's Basketball Championship Game for the national title, which they lost.

== Roster ==
2016–17 Mississippi State Bulldogs women's basketball team
Players
Coaches

| Pos. | # | Name | Height | Year | Previous school | Hometown |
|---|---|---|---|---|---|---|
| G | 00 | Dominique Dillingham | 5 ft 9 in (1.75 m) | Sr | Klein Collins HS | Spring, TX |
| G | 1 | Blair Schaefer | 5 ft 7 in (1.7 m) | Jr | Starkville HS | Starkville, MS |
| G | 2 | Morgan William | 5 ft 5 in (1.65 m) | Jr | Shades Valley HS | Birmingham, AL |
| F | 3 | Breanna Richardson | 6 ft 1 in (1.85 m) | Sr | Rockdale County HS | Conyers, GA |
| F | 4 | Ameshya Williams | 6 ft 2 in (1.88 m) | Fr | West Harrison HS | Gulfport, MS |
| G | 10 | Jazzmun Holmes | 5 ft 8 in (1.73 m) | So | Harrison Central HS | Gulfport, MS |
| G | 11 | Roshunda Johnson | 5 ft 7 in (1.7 m) | RS Jr | Parkview Arts & Science | Little Rock, AR |
| G | 12 | Jacaira Allen | 5 ft 10 in (1.78 m) | Fr | Dillard HS | Pompano Beach, FL |
| F | 13 | Ketara Chapel | 6 ft 1 in (1.85 m) | Sr | Temple HS | Temple, TX |
| C | 15 | Teaira McCowan | 6 ft 7 in (2.01 m) | So | Brenham HS | Brenham, TX |
| C | 25 | Zion Campbell | 6 ft 3 in (1.91 m) | RS Fr | Riverdale Baptist School | Washington, DC |
| F | 35 | Victoria Vivians | 6 ft 1 in (1.85 m) | Jr | Scott Central HS | Forest, MS |
| C | 45 | Chinwe Okorie | 6 ft 5 in (1.96 m) | Sr | Stoneleigh-Burnham Prep | Lagos, Nigeria |

Head coach

- Vic Schaefer (Texas A&M)

Assistant coach(es)

- Johnnie Harris (Arkansas Baptist)
- Dionnah Jackson (Oklahoma)
- Carly Thibault (Monmouth)

Legend

- (C) Team captain
- (S) Suspended
- (I) Ineligible
- (W) Walk-on
- Injured
- Current redshirt

Roster

== Schedule ==
| Date time, TV | Rank^{#} | Opponent^{#} | Result | Record | Site (attendance) city, state |
Exhibition
| 11/03/2016*; 6:00 pm | No. 10 | Arkansas–Fort Smith | W 88–62 | | Humphrey Coliseum (1,736); Starkville, MS |
Non-conference regular season
| 11/11/2016*; 6:30 pm | No. 10 | vs. Villanova; Maine Tip-Off Tournament semifinals | W 108–62 | 1–0 | Cross Insurance Center (2,416); Bangor, ME |
| 11/12/2016*; 6:00 pm | No. 10 | at Maine; Maine Tip-Off Tournament championship | W 87–43 | 2–0 | Cross Insurance Center (2,182); Bangor, ME |
| 11/16/2016*; 7:00 pm | No. 10 | vs. Tulane | W 66–49 | 3–0 | Mississippi Coast Coliseum (1,724); Biloxi, MS |
| 11/20/2016*; 5:00 pm, SECN | No. 10 | No. 8 Texas | W 79–68 | 4–0 | Humphrey Coliseum (7,764); Starkville, MS |
| 11/25/2016*; 8:00 pm | No. 7 | vs. Oregon; Rainbow Wahine Shootout | W 75–63 | 5–0 | Stan Sheriff Center; Honolulu, HI |
| 11/26/2016*; 8:00 pm | No. 7 | vs. San Jose State; Rainbow Wahine Shootout | W 88–51 | 6–0 | Stan Sheriff Center; Honolulu, HI |
| 11/27/2016*; 9:30 pm | No. 7 | at Hawaii; Rainbow Wahine Shootout | W 66–41 | 7–0 | Stan Sheriff Center; Honolulu, HI |
| 12/03/2016*; 1:30 pm, FSN | No. 6 | at Iowa State; Big 12/SEC Women's Challenge | W 85–81 ^{OT} | 8–0 | Hilton Coliseum (10,643); Ames, IA |
| 12/10/2016*; 4:00 pm | No. 5 | at Southern Miss | W 72–50 | 9–0 | Reed Green Coliseum (2,890); Hattiesburg, MS |
| 12/13/2016*; 6:30 pm | No. 5 | at Little Rock | W 58–44 | 10–0 | Jack Stephens Center (1,534); Little Rock, AR |
| 12/16/2016*; 10:00 pm | No. 5 | vs. SMU; Women of Troy Classic semifinals | W 92–41 | 11–0 | Galen Center (717); Los Angeles, CA |
| 12/18/2016*; 3:00 pm | No. 5 | at USC; Women of Troy Classic championship | W 76–72 | 12–0 | Galen Center (1,213); Los Angeles, CA |
| 12/20/2016*; 7:00 pm | No. 5 | Alabama State | W 90–47 | 13–0 | Humphrey Coliseum (5,786); Starkville, MS |
| 12/28/2016*; 7:00 pm | No. 5 | Northwestern State | W 106–30 | 14–0 | Humphrey Coliseum (6,352); Starkville, MS |
SEC regular season
| 01/01/2017; 2:00 pm, SECN | No. 5 | LSU | W 74–48 | 15–0 (1–0) | Humphrey Coliseum (5,849); Starkville, MS |
| 01/05/2017; 7:00 pm | No. 4 | at Arkansas | W 59–51 | 16–0 (2–0) | Bud Walton Arena (1,233); Fayetteville, AR |
| 01/08/2017; 1:00 pm | No. 4 | at Tennessee | W 74–64 | 17–0 (3–0) | Thompson–Boling Arena (8,553); Knoxville, TN |
| 01/12/2017; 8:00 pm, SECN | No. 4 | Florida | W 82–49 | 18–0 (4–0) | Humphrey Coliseum (5,575); Starkville, MS |
| 01/16/2017; 6:00 pm, SECN | No. 4 | Ole Miss | W 73–62 | 19–0 (5–0) | Humphrey Coliseum (8,840); Starkville, MS |
| 01/19/2017; 7:00 pm, SECN | No. 4 | at Alabama | W 67–54 | 20–0 (6–0) | Coleman Coliseum (2,605); Tuscaloosa, AL |
| 01/23/2017; 6:00 pm, ESPN2 | No. 4 | at No. 5 South Carolina | L 61–64 | 20–1 (6–1) | Colonial Life Arena (13,120); Columbia, SC |
| 01/29/2017; 6:00 pm, SECN | No. 4 | Texas A&M | W 71–61 | 21–1 (7–1) | Humphrey Coliseum (7,780); Starkville, MS |
| 02/02/2017; 8:00 pm, SECN | No. 5 | at Auburn | W 77–47 | 22–1 (8–1) | Auburn Arena (1,969); Auburn, AL |
| 02/05/2017; 1:30 pm, ESPNU | No. 5 | Missouri | W 70–53 | 23–1 (9–1) | Humphrey Coliseum (5,792); Starkville, MS |
| 02/09/2017; 8:00 pm, SECN | No. 4 | Vanderbilt | W 86–41 | 24–1 (10–1) | Humphrey Coliseum (5,052); Starkville, MS |
| 02/12/2017; 3:00 pm, SECN | No. 4 | at Ole Miss | W 66–44 | 25–1 (11–1) | The Pavilion at Ole Miss (4,634); Oxford, MS |
| 02/16/2017; 7:00 pm | No. 3 | Georgia | W 58–49 | 26–1 (12–1) | Humphrey Coliseum (5,431); Starkville, MS |
| 02/19/2017; 2:00 pm, SECN | No. 3 | at No. 23 Texas A&M | W 72–67 | 27–1 (13–1) | Reed Arena (5,243); College Station, TX |
| 02/23/2017; 6:00 pm | No. 3 | at No. 22 Kentucky | L 75–78 ^{OT} | 27–2 (13–2) | Memorial Colisuem (5,244); Lexington, KY |
| 02/26/2017; 4:00 pm, ESPN2 | No. 3 | Tennessee | L 64–82 | 27–3 (13–3) | Humphrey Coliseum (10,500); Starkville, MS |
SEC Women's Tournament
| 03/03/2017; 5:00 pm, SECN | (2) No. 6 | vs. (7) LSU quarterfinals | W 78–61 | 28–3 | Bon Secours Wellness Arena (4,330); Greenville, SC |
| 03/04/2017; 6:30 pm, ESPNU | (2) No. 6 | vs. (6) Texas A&M semifinals | W 66–50 | 29–3 | Bon Secours Wellness Arena (7,554); Greenville, SC |
| 03/05/2017; 2:00 pm, ESPN | (2) No. 6 | vs. (1) No. 5 South Carolina championship game | L 49–59 | 29–4 | Bon Secours Wellness Arena (7,715); Greenville, SC |
NCAA Women's Tournament
| 03/17/2017*; 1:30 pm, ESPN2 | (2 O) No. 7 | (15 O) Troy; First Round | W 110–69 | 30–4 | Humphrey Coliseum (5,572); Starkville, MS |
| 03/19/2017*; 1:30 pm, ESPN2 | (2 O) No. 7 | (7 O) No. 19 DePaul; Second Round | W 92–71 | 31–4 | Humphrey Coliseum (6,035); Starkville, MS |
| 03/24/2017*; 6:00 pm, ESPN2 | (2 O) No. 7 | vs. (3 O) No. 11 Washington; Sweet Sixteen | W 75–64 | 32–4 | Chesapeake Energy Arena; Oklahoma City, OK |
| 03/26/2017*; 6:30 pm, ESPN | (2 O) No. 7 | vs. (1 O) No. 5 Baylor; Elite Eight | W 94–85 ^{OT} | 33–4 | Chesapeake Energy Arena (3,128); Oklahoma City, OK |
| 03/31/2017*; 8:30 pm, ESPN2 | (2 O) No. 7 | vs. (1 B) No. 1 Connecticut; Final Four | W 66–64 ^{OT} | 34–4 | American Airlines Center (19,202); Dallas, TX |
| 04/02/2017*; 5:00 pm, ESPN | (2 O) No. 7 | vs. (1 S) No. 3 South Carolina; Championship Game | L 55–67 | 34–5 | American Airlines Center (19,229); Dallas, TX |
*Non-conference game. ^{#}Rankings from AP Poll. (#) Tournament seedings in parentheses. O=Oklahoma City Region. All times are in Central Time.

== Rankings ==
Regular season polls
| Poll | Pre- Season | Week 2 | Week 3 | Week 4 | Week 5 | Week 6 | Week 7 | Week 8 | Week 9 | Week 10 | Week 11 | Week 12 | Week 13 | Week 14 | Week 15 | Week 16 | Week 17 | Week 18 | Week 19 | Final |
|---|---|---|---|---|---|---|---|---|---|---|---|---|---|---|---|---|---|---|---|---|
| AP | 10 | 10 | 7 | 6 | 5 | 5 | 5 | 5 | 4 | 4 | 4 | 4 | 5 | 4 | 3 | 3 | 6т | 7 | 7 | N/A |
| Coaches | 11 | 9 | 7 | 6 | 5 | 5 | 5 | 5 | 4 | 4 | 4 | 5 | 4 | 3 | 3 | 2 | 5 | 7 | 7 | 2 |

Legend
| | Increase in ranking |
| | Decrease in ranking |
| | Not ranked previous week |
| (RV) | Received Votes |

== See also ==
- 2016–17 Mississippi State Bulldogs men's basketball team
