= Horizon Christian Academy =

Location
- 1270 Sawnee Drive; Cumming, Georgia 30041; United States
- 34.2268°N 84.1398°W

Information
- Type: Private
- Religious affiliation: Christian
- Denomination: multi-denominational
- Established: 2000
- Head of School: Tom Shefchunas
- Faculty: 21.3 (on FTE basis)
- Grades: K to 12
- Student to teacher ratio: 10.5
- Colors: Navy blue and gold
- Athletics conference: GAPPS
- Sports: Football, soccer, basketball, baseball, volleyball, tennis, cross country, shotgun
- Mascot: William the Warrior
- Team name: Warriors
- Accreditation: Southern Association of Colleges and Schools, Association of Christian Schools International
- Website: hcaga.org

Horizon Christian Academy is a private, multi-denominational Christian school in Cumming, Georgia, United States. The school serves students in kindergarten through 12th grade.

== History ==
Horizon's high school division was started in 2000 by the school's founder Garin Berry, and the elementary was started in 2004.

== Championships ==
- 2025
  - Varsity Lady Warrior Basketball Region Champions
  - Varsity Warrior Basketball Region Region Up
  - Varsity Lady Warrior Basketball State Runner Up
  - Varsity Lady Warrior Soccer State Runner Up
- 2024
  - Varsity Lady Warriors Basketball Region Champions
  - Varsity Warriors Basketball Region Champions
  - Varsity Lady Warriors Basketball State Champions
  - Varsity Warriors Basketball State Runner-Up
  - Varsity Lady Warriors Soccer State Runner-Up
  - Varsity Warriors Soccers State Runner-Up
- 2023
  - Varsity Lady Warriors Basketball Region Champions
  - Varsity Warriors Basketball Region Runner-Up
  - Varsity Lady Warriors Basketball State Runner-Up
  - Varsity Warriors Baseball State Runner-Up
  - Varsity Lady Warriors Volleyball Region Champions
- 2022
  - 8-Man Varsity Football State Runner-Up
  - 8-Man Varsity Football Region Champions
  - Middle School Boys Basketball District Champions
  - Middle School Boys Basketball Region Champions
  - Middle School Girls Basketball Region Champions
  - Varsity Baseball Region Champions
  - Varsity Boys Soccer Region Runner-Up
- 2020 Football State Champion
- 2016-2017: Boys' Basketball Division I-A
- 2015-2016: Boys' Basketball Division I-A
- 2015-2016: Football Runner-Up Division II
- 2014-2015: Volleyball Division II
- 2013-2014: Volleyball Division II
- 2013-2014: Boys' Basketball Division II-A
