= 2016–17 East Carolina Pirates women's basketball team =

Intercollegiate basketball season

2016–17 East Carolina Pirates women's basketball
- Conference: American Athletic Conference
- Record: 11–19 (2–14 The American)
- Head coach: Heather Macy (7th season)
- Assistant coaches: Rich Conover; Darren Guensch; Nicole Mealing
- Home arena: Williams Arena

2016–17 American Athletic Conference women's basketball standings
	Conf.				Overall
Team	W		L	PCT	W		L	PCT
No. 1 UConn †	16	–	0	1.000	36	–	1	.973
Temple	13	–	3	.813	24	–	8	.750
South Florida	11	–	5	.688	24	–	9	.727
UCF	9	–	7	.563	21	–	12	.636
SMU	7	–	9	.438	19	–	15	.559
Tulane	7	–	9	.438	18	–	15	.545
Cincinnati	7	–	9	.438	16	–	14	.533
Memphis	7	–	9	.438	14	–	16	.467
Tulsa	5	–	11	.313	10	–	21	.323
Houston	4	–	12	.250	12	–	19	.387
East Carolina	2	–	14	.125	11	–	19	.367
† 2017 The American Tournament winner As of March 31, 2017; Rankings from AP poll

The 2016–17 East Carolina Pirates women's basketball team represented East Carolina University during the 2016–17 NCAA Division I women's basketball season. The Pirates, led by seventh year head coach Heather Macy, played their home games at Williams Arena at Minges Coliseum and were third year members of the American Athletic Conference. They finished the season 11–19, 2–14 AAC play to finish in last place. They lost in the first round of the American Athletic women's tournament to SMU.

== Media ==
All Pirates home games will have a video stream on Pirates All Access, ESPN3, or AAC Digital. Road games will typically be streamed on the opponents website, though conference road games could also appear on ESPN3 or AAC Digital. Audio broadcasts for most road games can also be found on the opponents website.

== Roster ==
2016–17 East Carolina Pirates women's basketball team
Players
Coaches

Pos.	#	Name	Height	Year	Previous school	Hometown
G	0	Justice McGee	5 ft 7 in (1.7 m)	Fr	Timmonsville	Timmonsville, SC
G	1	Alexandra Frazier	5 ft 9 in (1.75 m)	So	Central Gwinnett	Lawrenceville, GA
G	2	Khadidja Toure	5 ft 9 in (1.75 m)	RS Sr	Kamiakan; Oregon State	Kennewick, WA
G/F	3	Manesha Womble	5 ft 11 in (1.8 m)	Sr	Carver; Odessa College	Atlanta, GA
G	11	Raven Johnson	6 ft 0 in (1.83 m)	Fr	Parkview	Lilburn, GA
G/F	13	Fanni Csutoras	5 ft 11 in (1.8 m)	Sr	PTE Deak Ferenc Gyakorlo; Iowa Western CC	Bogád, Hungary
C	15	Thais Oliveira	6 ft 2 in (1.88 m)	Jr	College of Central Florida	Manaus Amazonas, Brazil
G/F	20	Bre McDonald	6 ft 0 in (1.83 m)	RS Sr	Chamblee; West Virginia	Lithonia, GA
G/F	21	Alexis Cortez	5 ft 11 in (1.8 m)	Fr	Tucson	Tucson, AZ
G/F	23	Dominique Claytor	5 ft 11 in (1.8 m)	Fr	Winston-Salem Prep	Winston-Salem, NC
F	24	Kristen Gaffney	6 ft 1 in (1.85 m)	RS Sr	Green Hope; Vanderbilt	Cary, NC
G	25	Antoinette Bannister	6 ft 1 in (1.85 m)	RS Sr	Potter's House Christian Academy; Florida	Jacksonville, FL
G/F	40	Gabrielle Holston	6 ft 0 in (1.83 m)	RS Jr	Center Point; Georgia Tech	Margaret, AL

Head coach

- Heather Macy (Greensboro)

Assistant coach(es)

- Rich Conover (Green Mountain)
- Darren Guensch (Radford)
- Nicole Mealing (Francis Marion)

Legend

- (C) Team captain
- (S) Suspended
- (I) Ineligible
- (W) Walk-on
- Injured
- Current redshirt

Roster

== Schedule and results ==
Date time, TV	Rank^{#}	Opponent^{#}	Result	Record	Site (attendance) city, state
Non-conference regular season
11/11/2016*; 5:30 pm		Greenboro	W 107–40	1–0	Williams Arena (886); Greensville, NC
11/13/2016*; 1:00 pm		Detroit	W 83–81 ^{OT}	2–0	Williams Arena (1,037); Greenville, NC
11/16/2016*; 11:30 am		UNC Wilmington	W 75–65	3–0	Williams Arena (4,958); Greenville, NC
11/20/2016*; 3:30 pm		Auburn	L 52–61	3–1	Williams Arena (1,019); Greenville, NC
11/22/2016*; 2:00 pm		vs. Marist; Savannah Invitational	W 70–68	4–1	Savannah Civic Center; Savannah, GA
11/23/2016*; 4:30 pm		vs. No. 19 West Virginia; Savannah Invitational	L 47–79	4–2	Savannah Civic Center; Savannah, GA
11/24/2016*; 4:30 pm		vs. Ball State; Savannah Invitational	W 82–69 ^{OT}	5–2	Savannah Civic Center; Savannah, GA
11/28/2016*; 7:00 pm		Presbyterian	W 54–46	6–2	Williams Arena (905); Greenville, NC
12/01/2016*; 7:00 pm		at Charlotte	L 64–79	6–3	Dale F. Halton Arena (671); Charlotte, NC
12/04/2016*; 1:00 pm		Maryland Eastern Shore	W 66–58	7–3	Williams Arena (1,014); Greenville, NC
12/17/2016*; 4:00 pm		at Richmond	W 71–60	8–3	Robins Center (586); Richmond, VA
12/20/2016*; 7:00 pm		Southern	W 62–55	9–3	Williams Arena (1,067); Greenville, NC
12/28/2016*; 7:00 pm		at William & Mary	L 72–82	9–4	Kaplan Arena (372); Williamsburg, VA
AAC regular season
12/31/2016; 2:30 pm		Tulane	L 45–65	9–5 (0–1)	Williams Arena (903); Greenville, NC
01/04/2017; 7:00 pm, SNY/ESPN3		at No. 1 Connecticut	L 45–90	9–6 (0–2)	Gampel Pavilion (8,452); Storrs, CT
01/07/2017; 5:00 pm, ADN		SMU	W 58–57	10–6 (1–2)	Williams Arena (859); Greenville, NC
01/11/2017; 7:00 pm, ADN		at Temple	L 47–78	10–7 (1–3)	McGonigle Hall (719); Philadelphia, PA
01/14/2017; 7:00 pm, ADN		at No. 20 South Florida	L 48–79	10–8 (1–4)	USF Sun Dome (2,090); Tampa, FL
01/18/2017; 7:00 pm, ADN		UCF	L 42–54	10–9 (1–5)	Williams Arena (985); Greenville, NC
01/21/2017; 2:00 pm, ADN		at Cincinnati	L 64–74	10–10 (1–6)	Fifth Third Arena (679); Cincinnati, OH
01/24/2017; 7:00 pm, SNY/ESPN3		No. 1 Connecticut	L 44–91	10–11 (1–7)	Williams Arena (2,880); Greenville, NC
01/31/2017; 8:00 pm		at Tulsa	L 92–100 ^{OT}	10–12 (1–8)	Reynolds Center (193); Tulsa, OK
02/04/2017; 4:30 pm, ESPN3		Houston	L 62–73	10–13 (1–9)	Williams Arena (1,014); Greenville, NC
02/08/2017; 7:00 pm, ESPN3		No. 22 South Florida	L 66–76	10–14 (1–10)	Williams Arena (1,210); Greenville, NC
02/11/2016; 5:00 pm		Temple	L 43–76	10–15 (1–11)	Williams Arena (1,889); Greenville, NC
02/15/2017; 8:00 pm		at Memphis	L 50–72	10–16 (1–12)	Elma Roane Fieldhouse (583); Memphis, TN
02/18/2017; 2:00 pm, ADN		at UCF	L 51–79	10–17 (1–13)	CFE Arena (2,453); Orlando, FL
02/22/2017; 7:00 pm		Cincinnati	W 80–69	11–17 (2–13)	Williams Arena (1,099); Greenville, NC
02/25/2017; 3:00 pm		at Houston	L 65–81	11–18 (2–14)	Hofheinz Pavilion (787); Houston, TX
American Athletic Conference Women's Tournament
03/03/2017; 8:00 pm, ESPN3	(11)	vs. (6) SMU; First Round	L 54–60	11–19	Mohegan Sun Arena; Uncasville, CT
*Non-conference game. ^{#}Rankings from AP Poll. (#) Tournament seedings in parentheses. All times are in Eastern Time.

== Rankings ==
2016–17 NCAA Division I women's basketball rankings

+ Regular season polls	Poll	Pre- Season	Week 2	Week 3	Week 4	Week 5	Week 6	Week 7	Week 8	Week 9	Week 10	Week 11	Week 12	Week 13	Week 14	Week 15	Week 16	Week 17	Week 18	Week 19	Final
AP																				N/A	
Coaches																					

Legend
	Increase in ranking
	Decrease in ranking
	Not ranked previous week
(RV)	Received Votes

== See also ==
- 2016–17 East Carolina Pirates men's basketball team
