= 2016–17 South Florida Bulls women's basketball team =

Intercollegiate basketball season

2016–17 South Florida Bulls women's basketball

Junkanoo Jam Lucaya Division Champions

NCAA Women's Tournament, first round
- Conference: American Athletic Conference
- Record: 24–9 (11–5 The American)
- Head coach: Jose Fernandez (17th season)
- Associate head coach: Jeff Osterman
- Assistant coaches: Michele Woods-Baxter; Desma Thomas Bateast
- Home arena: USF Sun Dome

2016–17 American Athletic Conference women's basketball standings
	Conf.				Overall
Team	W		L	PCT	W		L	PCT
No. 1 UConn †	16	–	0	1.000	36	–	1	.973
Temple	13	–	3	.813	24	–	8	.750
South Florida	11	–	5	.688	24	–	9	.727
UCF	9	–	7	.563	21	–	12	.636
SMU	7	–	9	.438	19	–	15	.559
Tulane	7	–	9	.438	18	–	15	.545
Cincinnati	7	–	9	.438	16	–	14	.533
Memphis	7	–	9	.438	14	–	16	.467
Tulsa	5	–	11	.313	10	–	21	.323
Houston	4	–	12	.250	12	–	19	.387
East Carolina	2	–	14	.125	11	–	19	.367
† 2017 The American Tournament winner As of March 31, 2017; Rankings from AP poll

The 2016–17 South Florida Bulls women's basketball team represented the University of South Florida in the 2016–17 NCAA Division I basketball season. The Bulls, coached by Jose Fernandez in his seventeenth season, played their home games at the USF Sun Dome in Tampa, Florida. This was USF's fourth season as a member of the American Athletic Conference, known as The American or AAC. They finished the season 24–9, 11–5 in AAC play to finish in third place. They advanced to the championship game of the American Athletic Conference women's tournament for the third year in a row, where they lost to Connecticut for the third time. They received an at-large bid to the NCAA women's tournament, where they lost to Missouri in the first round.

== Media ==
All Bulls games aired on Bullscast Radio or CBS 1010 AM. Conference home games rotated between ESPN3, AAC Digital, and Bullscast. Road games were typically streamed on the opponent's website, though some conference road games also appeared on ESPN3 or AAC Digital.

== Roster ==
2016–17 South Florida Bulls women's basketball team
Players
Coaches

Pos.	#	Name	Height	Year	Previous school	Hometown
F	3	Jazzmaine Bond	6 ft 3 in (1.91 m)	Fr	Blackman	Murfreesboro, TN
F	10	Laura Ferreira	5 ft 11 in (1.8 m)	Jr	Escola Secundária De Santo André	Lisbon, Portugal
G/F	11	Ariadna Pujol	6 ft 1 in (1.85 m)	Sr	GEM	Mataró, Spain
F	12	Maria Jesperson	6 ft 0 in (1.83 m)	Jr	Marselisborg	Hojbjerg, Denmark
G	13	Dorottya Nagy	5 ft 8 in (1.73 m)	Fr	PINKK-Pécsi	Pécs, Hungary
F	14	Paige Cashin	6 ft 4 in (1.93 m)	Sr	Newark	Newark, OH
G	20	Nachalie De Jesus	5 ft 7 in (1.7 m)	Jr	John A. Ferguson HS; Miami Dade College	Luquillo, PR
F	21	Shandrea Leverett	6 ft 2 in (1.88 m)	Fr	South Effingham HS	Rincon, GA
G	22	Laia Flores	5 ft 7 in (1.7 m)	Jr	Institut Municipal Biada	Mataró, Spain
F	23	Tamara Henshaw	6 ft 1 in (1.85 m)	Fr	Flagler Palm Coast HS	Palm Coast, FL
G	24	Enna Penhadzic	5 ft 9 in (1.75 m)	Fr	None	Denmark
C	32	Nancy Warioba	6 ft 3 in (1.91 m)	Sr	Tigoi Girls HS; Blinn College	Kisumu, Kenya
F	33	Kitija Laksa	6 ft 0 in (1.83 m)	So	Rigas Francu Licejs	Riga, Latvia
C	45	Katelyn Weber	6 ft 5 in (1.96 m)	Sr	Hall	Little Rock, AR

Head coach

- Jose Fernandez (Miami-Dade Kendall)

Assistant coach(es)

- Jeff Osterman (Siena)
- Michele Woods-Baxter (St. John Fisher College)
- Desma Thomas Bateast (Miami (FL))

Legend

- (C) Team captain
- (S) Suspended
- (I) Ineligible
- (W) Walk-on
- Injured
- Current redshirt

Roster

== Schedule ==
Date time, TV	Rank^{#}	Opponent^{#}	Result	Record	Site (attendance) city, state
Regular season
11/15/2016*; 7:00 pm		North Florida	W 78–42	1–0	USF Sun Dome (1,906); Tampa, FL
11/21/2016*; 7:00 pm		Jacksonville	W 64–52	2–0	USF Sun Dome (1,776); Tampa, FL
11/24/2016*; 4:45 pm		vs. North Carolina; Junkanoo Jam Lucaya Division semifinals	W 83–55	3–0	St. George HS Gymnasium; Freeport, BAH
11/26/2016*; 6:45 pm		vs. Georgia; Junkanoo Jam Lucaya Division championship	W 81–65	4–0	St. George HS Gymnasium (543); Freeport, BAH
11/30/2016*; 7:00 pm		FIU	W 91–41	5–0	USF Sun Dome (1,812); Tampa, FL
12/02/2016*; 7:00 pm		at Butler	W 74–59	6–0	Hinkle Fieldhouse (343); Indianapolis, IN
12/11/2016*; 3:00 pm	No. 22	at Arkansas State	W 78–59	7–0	Convocation Center (1,058); Jonesboro, AR
12/14/2016*; 7:00 pm	No. 22	Saint Francis (PA)	W 129–80	8–0	USF Sun Dome (1,759); Tampa, FL
12/19/2016*; 3:30 pm	No. 21	vs. Long Beach State; Play4Kay Shootout quarterfinals	L 68–73	8–1	T-Mobile Arena; Paradise, NV
12/20/2016*; 3:30 pm	No. 21	vs. Santa Clara; Play4Kay Shootout consolation 2nd round	W 63–54	9–1	T-Mobile Arena; Paradise, NV
12/21/2016*; 6:00 pm	No. 21	vs. UNLV; Play4Kay Shootout 5th place game	W 77–42	10–1	T-Mobile Arena; Paradise, NV
12/30/2016*; 7:00 pm	No. 23	Stetson	W 74–60	11–1	USF Sun Dome (1,956); Tampa, FL
01/04/2017; 8:00 pm, ESPN3	No. 22	at Tulane	W 62–53	12–1 (1–0)	Devlin Fieldhouse (1,048); New Orleans, LA
01/07/2017; 7:00 pm, ESPN3	No. 22	Tulsa	W 84–68	13–1 (2–0)	USF Sun Dome (1,900); Tampa, FL
01/10/2017; 7:00 pm, CBSSN	No. 20	at No. 1 Connecticut	L 37–102	13–2 (2–1)	XL Center (10,109); Hartford, CT
01/14/2017; 7:00 pm, ADN	No. 20	East Carolina	W 79–48	14–2 (3–1)	USF Sun Dome (2,090); Tampa, FL
01/17/2017; 7:00 pm, CBSSN	No. 23	Memphis	W 79–49	15–2 (4–1)	USF Sun Dome (1,951); Tampa, FL
01/22/2017*; 2:00 pm, ESPNU	No. 23	No. 9 Louisville	L 52–66	15–3	USF Sun Dome (2,334); Tampa, FL
01/25/2017; 8:00 pm	No. 23	at SMU	W 52–51	16–3 (5–1)	Moody Coliseum (831); Dallas, TX
01/29/2017; 12:00 pm, CBSSN	No. 23	at Temple	W 55–51	17–3 (6–1)	McGonigle Hall (1,271); Philadelphia, PA
02/01/2017; 7:00 pm, ADN	No. 20	Cincinnati	W 72–52	18–3 (7–1)	USF Sun Dome (1,931); Tampa, FL
02/05/2017; 6:30 pm, ESPNU	No. 20	at Memphis	L 57–62	18–4 (7–2)	Elma Roane Fieldhouse (174); Memphis, TN
02/08/2017; 7:00 pm	No. 22	at East Carolina	W 76–66	19–4 (8–2)	Williams Arena (1,210); Greenville, NC
02/12/2017; 12:00 pm, ESPN2	No. 22	Tulane	W 66–56	20–4 (9–2)	USF Sun Dome (2,047); Tampa, FL
02/14/2017; 7:00 pm, ESPN3	No. 22	UCF; War on I-4	L 62–66	20–5 (9–3)	USF Sun Dome (1,884); Tampa, FL
02/19/2017; 1:00 pm, ESPN2	No. 22	Temple	L 71–77	20–6 (9–4)	USF Sun Dome (2,281); Tampa, FL
02/21/2017; 8:00 pm		at Houston	W 79–50	21–6 (10–4)	Hofheinz Pavilion (568); Houston, TX
02/25/2017; 3:00 pm		at Tulsa	W 90–64	22–6 (11–4)	Reynolds Center (674); Tulsa, OK
02/27/2017; 7:00 pm, ESPN2		No. 1 Connecticut	L 68–96	22–7 (11–5)	USF Sun Dome (5,948); Tampa, FL
American Athletic Conference Women's Tournament
03/04/2017; 8:00 pm, ESPN3	(3)	vs. (6) SMU; Quarterfinals	W 62–55	23–7	Mohegan Sun Arena (4,559); Uncasville, CT
03/05/2017; 7:30 pm, ESPNU	(3)	vs. (2) No. 25 Temple; Semifinals	W 63–58	24–7	Mohegan Sun Arena (6,491); Uncasville, CT
03/06/2017; 7:00 pm, ESPN2	(3)	vs. (1) No. 1 Connecticut; Championship Game	L 44–100	24–8	Mohegan Sun Arena (6,488); Uncasville, CT
NCAA Women's Tournament
03/17/2017*; 5:00 pm, ESPN2	(11 S)	vs. (6 S) No. 25 Missouri; First Round	L 64–66	24–9	Donald L. Tucker Center; Tallahassee, FL
*Non-conference game. ^{#}Rankings from AP Poll. (#) Tournament seedings in parentheses. S=Stockton Region. All times are in EST.

== Rankings ==
Regular season polls
Poll	Pre- season	Week 2	Week 3	Week 4	Week 5	Week 6	Week 7	Week 8	Week 9	Week 10	Week 11	Week 12	Week 13	Week 14	Week 15	Week 16	Week 17	Week 18	Week 19	Final
AP	RV	RV	RV	RV	22	22	21т	23	22	20	23	23	20	22	22	RV	RV	RV	RV	N/A
Coaches	RV	RV	RV	RV	22	19	25	25	22	21	22	23	20	23	22	RV	RV	25	RV	RV

Legend
	Increase in ranking
	Decrease in ranking
	Not ranked previous week
(RV)	Received votes

== See also ==
- 2016–17 South Florida Bulls men's basketball team
