= 2016–17 SMU Mustangs women's basketball team =

Intercollegiate basketball season

2016–17 SMU Mustangs women's basketball

WNIT, Third Round
- Conference: American Athletic Conference
- Record: 19–15 (7–9 The American)
- Head coach: Travis Mays (1st season)
- Assistant coaches: Mike Brandt; Edwina Brown; Amie Smith Bradley
- Home arena: Moody Coliseum

2016–17 American Athletic Conference women's basketball standings
	Conf.				Overall
Team	W		L	PCT	W		L	PCT
No. 1 UConn †	16	–	0	1.000	36	–	1	.973
Temple	13	–	3	.813	24	–	8	.750
South Florida	11	–	5	.688	24	–	9	.727
UCF	9	–	7	.563	21	–	12	.636
SMU	7	–	9	.438	19	–	15	.559
Tulane	7	–	9	.438	18	–	15	.545
Cincinnati	7	–	9	.438	16	–	14	.533
Memphis	7	–	9	.438	14	–	16	.467
Tulsa	5	–	11	.313	10	–	21	.323
Houston	4	–	12	.250	12	–	19	.387
East Carolina	2	–	14	.125	11	–	19	.367
† 2017 The American Tournament winner As of March 31, 2017; Rankings from AP poll

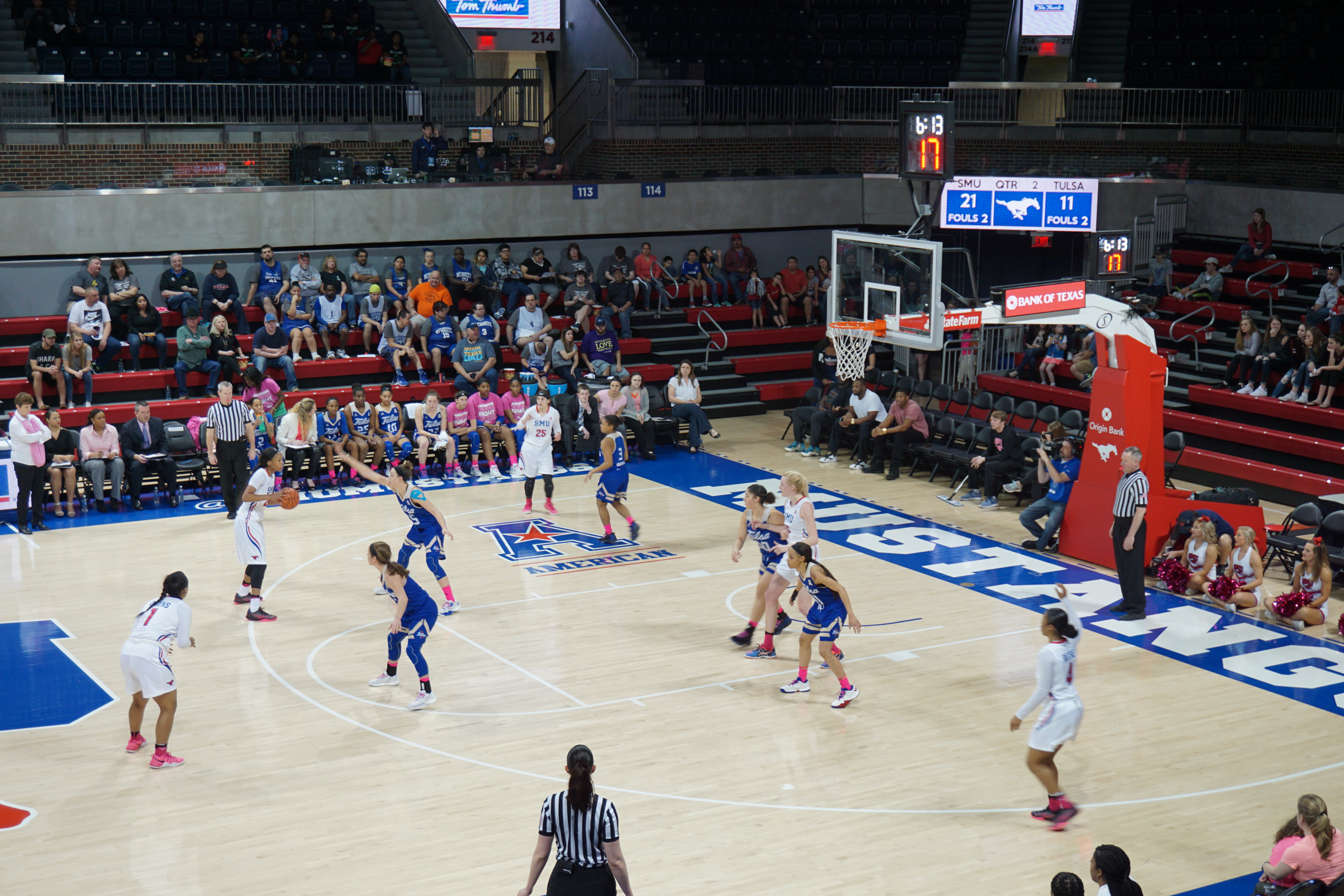
2016–17 SMU team playing against Tulsa at Moody Coliseum

The 2016–17 SMU Mustangs women's basketball team represented Southern Methodist University in the 2016–17 NCAA Division I women's basketball season. The Mustangs, led by first year head coach Travis Mays, played their home games at Moody Coliseum and were fourth year members of the American Athletic Conference. They finished the season 19–15, 7–9 in AAC play to finish in a three way tie for fifth place. They advanced to the quarterfinals of the American Athletic women's tournament where they lost to South Florida. They received a bid to the Women's National Invitational Tournament where they defeated Louisiana Tech and Abilene Christian in the first and second rounds before losing to Indiana in the third round.

== Media ==
All Pony Express games will air on KAAM. Before conference season home games will be streamed on Pony Up TV. Conference home games will rotate between ESPN3, AAC Digital, and Pony Up TV. Road games will typically be streamed on the opponents website, though conference road games could also appear on ESPN3 or AAC Digital.

== Roster ==
2016–17 SMU Mustangs women's basketball team
Players
Coaches

Pos.	#	Name	Height	Year	Previous school	Hometown
G	0	Kiara Perry	5 ft 10 in (1.78 m)	RS Jr	Duncanville	Duncanville, TX
G	1	Devri Owens	5 ft 8 in (1.73 m)	RS Jr	Plano West HS; Utah	Plano, TX
G	2	McKenzie Adams	5 ft 9 in (1.75 m)	RS Jr	Frisco Centennial; Arkansas	Frisco, TX
G	4	Mikayla Reese	5 ft 8 in (1.73 m)	Jr	Sand Creek	Colorado Springs, CO
G	5	Aurmani DeGar	5 ft 8 in (1.73 m)	Jr	Mansfield Timberview	Arlington, TX
F	10	Alicia Froling	6 ft 3 in (1.91 m)	Jr	Australia Institute of Sport	Queensland, Australia
F	11	Kiran Lakhian	6 ft 3 in (1.91 m)	Sr	Plano West; Stanford	Plano, TX
G	12	Morgan Bolton	5 ft 6 in (1.68 m)	RS Sr	Duncanville; Arkansas–Little Rock	Duncanville, TX
C	13	Klara Bradshaw (I) (redshirt)	6 ft 6 in (1.98 m)	RS Jr	Rains; TCU	Emory, TX
F	15	Stephanie Collins	6 ft 5 in (1.96 m)	Jr	Australia Institute of Sport	Melbourne, Australia
F	20	Dai'ja Thomas	6 ft 2 in (1.88 m)	So	Skyline	Dallas, TX
G	22	Tiara Davenport (I) (redshirt)	6 ft 0 in (1.83 m)	Jr	Duncanville; Louisiana Tech	Dallas, TX
G	24	Kamray Mickens	5 ft 8 in (1.73 m)	Sr	Carroll Southlake; Trinity Valley	Westlake, TX
G	25	Amaura Brandt	5 ft 8 in (1.73 m)	RS Sr	Augusta; Limestone	Aiken, SC

Head coach

- Travis Mays (Texas)

Assistant coach(es)

- Mike Brandt (Sterling (KS))
- Edwina Brown (Texas)
- Amie Smith Bradley (Texas)

Legend

- (C) Team captain
- (S) Suspended
- (I) Ineligible
- (W) Walk-on
- Injured
- Current redshirt

Roster

== Schedule and results ==
Date time, TV	Rank^{#}	Opponent^{#}	Result	Record	Site (attendance) city, state
Non-conference regular season
11/11/2016*; 11:30 am		Texas State	W 64–56	1–0	Moody Coliseum (2,617); Dallas, TX
11/16/2016*; 7:00 pm, ESPN3		at Kansas	W 75–63	2–0	Allen Fieldhouse (1,714); Lawrence, KS
11/19/2016*; 2:00 pm		at TCU	L 67–76	2–1	Schollmaier Arena (1,841); Fort Worth, TX
11/22/2016*; 5:30 pm		Prairie View A&M	W 61–54	3–1	Moody Coliseum (6,852); Dallas, TX
11/25/2016*; 6:00 pm		vs. Boston College; Omni Hotels Classic semifinals	W 71–62	4–1	Coors Events Center (1,483); Boulder, CO
11/26/2016*; 8:30 pm		at Colorado; Omni Hotels Classic championship	L 50–67	4–2	Coors Events Center (1,495); Boulder, CO
11/30/2016*; 7:00 pm		North Texas	W 65–51	5–2	Moody Coliseum (833); Dallas, TX
12/03/2016*; 3:00 pm		at New Mexico	L 49–64	5–3	The Pit (4,336); Albuquerque, NM
12/05/2016*; 7:00 pm		Texas A&M	W 54–53	6–3	Moody Coliseum (948); Dallas, TX
12/16/2016*; 10:00 pm		vs. No. 5 Mississippi State; Women of Troy Classic semifinals	L 42–91	6–4	Galen Center (717); Los Angeles, CA
12/18/2016*; 1:00 pm		vs. Grambling State; Women of Troy Classic 3rd place game	W 56–36	7–4	Galen Center (711); Los Angeles, CA
12/19/2016*; 4:00 pm		Texas Southern	W 61–36	8–4	Moody Coliseum; Dallas, TX
12/21/2016*; 1:00 pm		Seattle	W 77–43	9–4	Moody Coliseum (743); Dallas, TX
AAC regular season
12/31/2016; 2:00 pm, ADN		Cincinnati	W 64–47	10–4 (1–0)	Moody Coliseum (676); Dallas, TX
01/07/2017; 7:00 pm, ADN		East Carolina	L 57–58	10–5 (1–1)	Moody Coliseum (859); Dallas, TX
01/11/2017; 4:00 pm, ADN		Tulane	L 59–71	11–5 (1–2)	Moody Coliseum (758); Dallas, TX
01/14/2017; 2:00 pm, SNY/ESPN3		No. 1 Connecticut	L 48–88	11–6 (1–3)	Moody Coliseum (3,878); Dallas, TX
01/17/2017; 6:00 pm, ADN		at Cincinnati	L 65–67	11–7 (1–4)	Fifth Third Arena (523); Cincinnati, OH
01/21/2017; 2:00 pm, ADN		at Houston	W 66–45	11–8 (2–4)	Hofheinz Pavilion (957); Houston, TX
01/25/2017; 7:00 pm		No. 23 South Florida	L 51–52	11–9 (2–5)	Moody Coliseum (831); Dallas, TX
01/28/2017; 7:00 pm, ESPN3		at Tulsa	L 59–66	11–10 (2–6)	Reynolds Center (864); Tulsa, OK
01/31/2017; 7:00 pm, ADN		Memphis	W 53–44	12–10 (3–6)	Moody Coliseum (767); Dallas, TX
02/04/2017; 2:00 pm, ADN		UCF	W 63–58	13–10 (4–6)	Moody Coliseum (1,011); Dallas, TX
02/11/2017; 1:00 pm, SNY/ESPN3		at No. 1 Connecticut	L 41–83	13–11 (4–7)	Gampel Pavilion (10,012); Storrs, CT
02/15/2017; 6:00 pm		at Temple	L 52–66	13–12 (4–8)	McGonigle Hall (917); Philadelphia, PA
02/18/2017; 2:00 pm		Tulsa	W 62–41	14–12 (5–8)	Moody Coliseum (1,472); Dallas, TX
02/22/2017; 7:00 pm		at Memphis	W 60–39	15–12 (6–8)	Elma Roane Fieldhouse (873); Memphis, TN
02/25/2017; 1:00 pm		at UCF	L 37–63	15–13 (6–9)	CFE Arena (2,348); Orlando, FL
02/27/2017; 7:00 pm, ADN		Houston	W 74–45	16–13 (7–9)	Moody Coliseum (1,205); Dallas, TX
American Athletic Conference Women's Tournament
03/03/2017; 7:00 pm, ESPN3	(6)	vs. (11) East Carolina; First Round	W 60–54	17–13	Mohegan Sun Arena; Uncasville, CT
03/04/2017; 8:00 pm, ESPN3	(6)	vs. (3) South Florida; Quarterfinals	L 55–62	17–14	Mohegan Sun Arena (4,559); Uncasville, CT
WNIT
03/17/2017*; 7:00 pm		Louisiana Tech; First Round	W 75–70 ^{OT}	18–14	Moody Coliseum (847); Dallas, TX
03/20/2017*; 7:00 pm		Abilene Christian; Second Round	W 59–52	19–14	Moody Coliseum (1,210); Dallas, TX
03/23/2017*; 6:00 pm		at Indiana; Third Round	L 44–64	19–15	Simon Skjodt Assembly Hall (3,003); Bloomington, IN
*Non-conference game. ^{#}Rankings from AP Poll. (#) Tournament seedings in parentheses. All times are in Central Time.

== See also ==
- 2016–17 SMU Mustangs men's basketball team
