= 2016–17 Memphis Tigers women's basketball team =

Intercollegiate basketball season

2016–17 Memphis Tigers women's basketball
- Conference: American Athletic Conference
- Record: 14–16 (7–9 The American)
- Head coach: Melissa McFerrin (9th season)
- Assistant coaches: Danielle O'Banion; Jessica Bogia; Lee Yerty
- Home arena: Elma Roane Fieldhouse

2016–17 American Athletic Conference women's basketball standings
	Conf.				Overall
Team	W		L	PCT	W		L	PCT
No. 1 UConn †	16	–	0	1.000	36	–	1	.973
Temple	13	–	3	.813	24	–	8	.750
South Florida	11	–	5	.688	24	–	9	.727
UCF	9	–	7	.563	21	–	12	.636
SMU	7	–	9	.438	19	–	15	.559
Tulane	7	–	9	.438	18	–	15	.545
Cincinnati	7	–	9	.438	16	–	14	.533
Memphis	7	–	9	.438	14	–	16	.467
Tulsa	5	–	11	.313	10	–	21	.323
Houston	4	–	12	.250	12	–	19	.387
East Carolina	2	–	14	.125	11	–	19	.367
† 2017 The American Tournament winner As of March 31, 2017; Rankings from AP poll

The 2016–17 Memphis Tigers women's basketball team represented the University of Memphis during the 2016–17 NCAA Division I women's basketball season. The season marks the fourth for the Tigers as members of the American Athletic Conference. The Tigers, led by ninth year head coach Melissa McFerrin, played their home games at the Elma Roane Fieldhouse. They finished the season 14–16, 7–9 in AAC play to finish in a 4-way tie for fifth place. They lost in the first round of the American Athletic women's tournament to Tulsa.

== Media ==
All Tigers home games are broadcast live via radio on WUMR. Video streaming for all home games is available on the Memphis Tiger Network, ESPN3, or AAC Digital. Road games are typically streamed on the opponent's website, though conference road games may also appear on ESPN3 or AAC Digital.

== Roster ==
2016–17 Memphis Tigers women's basketball team
Players
Coaches

Pos.	#	Name	Height	Year	Previous school	Hometown
G	1	Breigha Wilder-Cochran	5 ft 9 in (1.75 m)	Sr	Hoover	Hoover, AL
G	2	Loysha Morris	5 ft 9 in (1.75 m)	Sr	Downsview; Garden City CC	Toronto, ON
G	3	Taylor Williams	6 ft 1 in (1.85 m)	Sr	Bishop Ward	Kansas City, KS
G	5	Brea Elmore	5 ft 9 in (1.75 m)	Jr	Redan	Stone Mountain, GA
F	10	Cheyenne Creighton	6 ft 1 in (1.85 m)	Jr	Blessed Pope John Paul II	Pickering, ON
G	15	Taylor Barnes	5 ft 8 in (1.73 m)	Fr	Saint Benedict at Auburndale	Memphis, TN
G	23	Alyssa Dean	5 ft 8 in (1.73 m)	Fr	Centennial HS	Columbus, OH
C	25	Brianna Porter	6 ft 3 in (1.91 m)	So	University School of Nashville	Nashville, TN
F	34	Ashia Jones	6 ft 1 in (1.85 m)	RS Jr	Covington; Tennessee–Martin	Covington, TN
G	40	Damonique Miller	5 ft 11 in (1.8 m)	RS So	Joe T. Robinson	Little Rock, AR
F	44	Milena Bajic	6 ft 1 in (1.85 m)	So	None	Podgorica, Montenegro

Head coach

- Melissa McFerrin (Missouri)

Assistant coach(es)

- Danielle O'Banion (Boston College)
- Jessica Bogia (Lafayette)
- Lee Yerty (Washington State)

Legend

- (C) Team captain
- (S) Suspended
- (I) Ineligible
- (W) Walk-on
- Injured
- Current redshirt

Roster

== Schedule and results ==
Date time, TV	Rank^{#}	Opponent^{#}	Result	Record	Site (attendance) city, state
Exhibition
11/03/2016*; 7:00 pm		Lee University	L 44–52		Elma Roane Fieldhouse; Memphis, TN
Non-conference regular season
11/11/2016*; 7:00 pm		Missouri State	W 69–60	1–0	Elma Roane Fieldhouse (945); Memphis, TN
11/13/2016*; 2:00 pm		at Samford	L 42–48	1–1	Pete Hanna Center (513); Homewood, AL
11/17/2016*; 12:00 pm		Illinois	W 64–54	2–1	State Farm Center (2,358); Champaign, IL
11/20/2016*; 2:00 pm		Kansas	L 58–68	2–2	Elma Roane Fieldhouse (831); Memphis, TN
11/25/2016*; 4:30 pm		vs. Arkansas; Nuggget Classic semifinals	L 61–91	2–3	Lawlor Events Center (1,662); Reno, NV
11/26/2016*; 4:00 pm		at Nevada; Nuggget Classic 3rd place game	L 67–75	2–4	Lawlor Events Center (838); Reno, NV
11/30/2016*; 5:30 pm		Northwestern State	W 54–38	3–4	Elma Roane Fieldhouse (312); Memphis, TN
12/04/2016*; 2:00 pm		Little Rock	L 44–54	4–4	Elma Roane Fieldhouse (313); Memphis, TN
12/11/2016*; 7:00 pm		at Southern Illinois	L 61–69	4–5	SIU Arena (500); Carbondale, IL
12/16/2016*; 7:00 pm		Southeast Missouri State	W 65–63	5–5	Elma Roane Fieldhouse (617); Memphis, TN
12/19/2016*; 7:00 pm		Louisiana Tech	W 56–54	5–6	Elma Roane Fieldhouse (542); Memphis, TN
12/21/2016*; 1:00 pm		Nicholls State	W 73–62	6–6	Elma Roane Fieldhouse (342); Memphis, TN
12/28/2016*; 4:00 pm, ESPNU		Vanderbilt	W 75–59	7–6	Elma Roane Fieldhouse (1,034); Memphis, TN
AAC regular season
01/01/2017; 5:00 pm, ESPN2		Temple	L 67–73 ^{OT}	7–7 (0–1)	Elma Roane Fieldhouse; Memphis, TN
01/04/2017; 7:00 pm, ADN		at Tulane	L 52–57	7–8 (0–2)	Reynolds Center (211); Tulsa, OK
01/07/2017; 1:00 pm		at UCF	W 65–62	8–8 (1–2)	CFE Arena (2,316); Orlando, FL
01/14/2017; 1:00 pm		Cincinnati	L 59–66	8–9 (1–3)	Elma Roane Fieldhouse (786); Memphis, TN
01/17/2017; 6:00 pm, CBSSN		at No. 23 South Florida	L 49–79	8–10 (1–4)	USF Sun Dome (1,951); Tampa, FL
01/21/2017; 1:00 pm, ESPN3		at Temple	L 51–66	8–11 (1–5)	McGonigle Hall (1,117); Philadelphia, PA
01/25/2017; 7:00 pm, ADN		Houston	W 66–65	9–11 (2–5)	Elma Roane Fieldhouse (1,432); Memphis, TN
01/28/2017; 11:00 am		UCF	W 65–59	10–11 (3–5)	Elma Roane Fieldhouse (812); Memphis, TN
01/31/2017; 7:00 pm, ADN		at SMU	L 44–53	10–12 (3–6)	Moody Coliseum (767); Dallas, TX
02/05/2017; 5:30 pm, ESPNU		No. 20 South Florida	W 62–57	11–12 (4–6)	Elma Roane Fieldhouse (174); Memphis, TN
02/09/2017; 7:00 pm, ESPN3		at Tulane	W 55–52	12–12 (5–6)	Devlin Fieldhouse (1,098); New Orleans, LA
02/15/2017; 7:00 pm		East Carolina	W 72–50	13–12 (6–6)	Elma Roane Fieldhouse (583); Memphis, TN
02/18/2017; 2:00 pm, ESPN3		at Cincinnati	L 57–68	13–13 (6–7)	Fifth Third Arena (1,170); Cincinnati, OH
02/22/2017; 7:00 pm		SMU	L 39–60	13–14 (6–8)	Elma Roane Fieldhouse (873); Memphis, TN
02/25/2017; 3:00 pm, SNY/ESPN3		at No. 1 Connecticut	L 48–91	13–15 (6–9)	Gampel Pavilion (10,167); Storrs, CT
02/27/2017; 7:00 pm, ESPN3		Tulane	W 57–56	14–15 (7–9)	Elma Roane Fieldhouse (818); Memphis, TN
American Athletic Conference Women's Tournament
03/03/2017; 3:00 pm, ESPN3	(8)	vs. (9) Tulsa; First Round	L 55–60	14–16	Mohegan Sun Arena; Uncasville, CT
*Non-conference game. ^{#}Rankings from AP Poll. (#) Tournament seedings in parentheses. All times are in Central Time.

== See also ==
- 2016–17 Memphis Tigers men's basketball team
