= 2016–17 Cincinnati Bearcats women's basketball team =

Intercollegiate basketball season

2016–17 Cincinnati Bearcats women's basketball
- Conference: American Athletic Conference
- Record: 16–14 (7–9 The American)
- Head coach: Jamelle Elliott (8th season)
- Assistant coaches: Tasha Brown; Katie Rokus; Geoff Lanier
- Home arena: Fifth Third Arena

2016–17 American Athletic Conference women's basketball standings
	Conf.				Overall
Team	W		L	PCT	W		L	PCT
No. 1 UConn †	16	–	0	1.000	36	–	1	.973
Temple	13	–	3	.813	24	–	8	.750
South Florida	11	–	5	.688	24	–	9	.727
UCF	9	–	7	.563	21	–	12	.636
SMU	7	–	9	.438	19	–	15	.559
Tulane	7	–	9	.438	18	–	15	.545
Cincinnati	7	–	9	.438	16	–	14	.533
Memphis	7	–	9	.438	14	–	16	.467
Tulsa	5	–	11	.313	10	–	21	.323
Houston	4	–	12	.250	12	–	19	.387
East Carolina	2	–	14	.125	11	–	19	.367
† 2017 The American Tournament winner As of March 31, 2017; Rankings from AP poll

The 2016–17 Cincinnati Bearcats women's basketball team represented the University of Cincinnati during the 2016–17 NCAA Division I women's basketball season. The season marks the third for the Bearcats as members of the American Athletic Conference. The Bearcats, led by eighth year head coach Jamelle Elliott, played their home games at Fifth Third Arena. They finished the season 16–14, 7–9 in AAC play to finish in a 4 way tie for fifth place. They lost in the first round of the American Athletic women's tournament to Houston.

== Media ==
All games will have a video stream on Bearcats TV, ESPN3, or AAC Digital Network

== Roster ==
2016–17 Cincinnati Bearcats women's basketball team
Players
Coaches

Pos.	#	Name	Height	Year	Previous school	Hometown
G	2	Nikira Goings	5 ft 9 in (1.75 m)	So	Osborne	Marietta, GA
G	3	Ana Owens	5 ft 6 in (1.68 m)	Jr	Lawrence North	Indianapolis, IN
F	4	Angel Rizor	6 ft 0 in (1.83 m)	Fr	East Wake	Zebulon, NC
G	11	Sam Rodgers	5 ft 9 in (1.75 m)	Fr	Lakota East	Cincinnati, OH
G	12	Antoinette Miller	5 ft 5 in (1.65 m)	Fr	Southfield-Lathrup	Detroit, MI
G	13	Brandey Tarver	5 ft 10 in (1.78 m)	Sr	Bogan Computer Technical	Chicago, IL
G	20	Maya Benham	6 ft 0 in (1.83 m)	So	Osborne	Doulgasville, GA
F	21	Brianna Moore	6 ft 1 in (1.85 m)	Jr	Luella	Locust Grove, GA
G	22	Bianca Quisenberry	5 ft 8 in (1.73 m)	Sr	Tecumseh	Springfield, OH
F	23	Sydney Petty	6 ft 0 in (1.83 m)	Fr	Rogers	Toledo, OH
F	25	Chelsea Warren	6 ft 1 in (1.85 m)	So	Red Oak	Red Oak, TX
G	32	Tinee'sha Coleman	5 ft 10 in (1.78 m)	Fr	Marshall	Chicago, IL
C	35	I'Liyah Green	6 ft 0 in (1.83 m)	Fr	Male	Louisville, KY

Head coach

- Jamelle Elliott (Connecticut)

Assistant coach(es)

- Tasha Brown (St. Ambrose)
- Katie Rokus (USC Aiken)
- Geoff Lanier (Southern Connecticut)

Legend

- (C) Team captain
- (S) Suspended
- (I) Ineligible
- (W) Walk-on
- Injured
- Current redshirt

Roster

== Schedule and results ==
Date time, TV	Rank^{#}	Opponent^{#}	Result	Record	Site (attendance) city, state
Exhibition
11/03/2016*; 7:00 pm, BearcatsTV		Kentucky Wesleyan	W 79–50		Fifth Third Arena (386); Cincinnati, OH
Non-conference regular season
11/11/2016*; 7:30 pm		at Southeast Missouri State	W 83–75	1–0	Show Me Center (1,267); Cape Girardeau, MO
11/15/2016*; 12:00 pm, ESPN3		at Bowling Green	W 68–58	2–0	Stroh Center (1,085); Bowling Green, OH
11/19/2016*; 6:00 pm, Bearcats TV		Indiana State	L 55–63	2–1	Fifth Third Arena (734); Cincinnati, OH
11/22/2016*; 12:00 pm		at Miami (OH)	W 49–43	3–1	Millett Hall (1,111); Oxford, OH
11/26/2016*; 5:30 pm, Bearcats TV		Howard	W 66–56	4–1	Fifth Third Arena (483); Cincinnati, OH
11/29/2016*; 7:00 pm, Bearcats TV		Arkansas–Pine Bluff	W 72–42	5–1	Fifth Third Arena (307); Cincinnati, OH
12/02/2016*; 7:00 pm, Bearcats TV		Tennessee Tech	W 60–38	6–1	Fifth Third Arena (494); Cincinnati, OH
12/04/2016*; 2:00 pm		at No. 9 Ohio State	L 38–80	6–2	Value City Arena (5,850); Columbus, OH
12/11/2016*; 2:00 pm, Bearcats TV		Xavier; Skyline Chili Crosstown Shootout	L 62–71	6–3	Fifth Third Arena (1,362); Cincinnati, OH
12/15/2016*; 12:00 pm, Bearcats TV		Georgia	L 48–51	6–4	Fifth Third Arena (569); Cincinnati, OH
12/18/2016*; 2:00 pm, Bearcats TV		Clarion	W 92–54	7–4	Fifth Third Arena (439); Cincinnati, OH
12/21/2016*; 3:00 pm, Bearcats TV		Eastern Illinois	W 78–64	8–4	Fifth Third Arena (271); Cincinnati, OH
12/28/2016*; 7:00 pm, Bearcats TV		Chicago State	W 81–53	9–4	Fifth Third Arena (466); Cincinnati, OH
AAC regular season
12/31/2016; 2:00 pm, ADN		at SMU	L 47–64	9–5 (0–1)	Moody Coliseum (676); Dallas, TX
01/04/2017; 7:00 pm, Bearcats TV		UCF	W 63–57	10–5 (1–1)	Fifth Third Arena (360); Cincinnati, OH
01/07/2017; 2:00 pm, Bearcats TV		Houston	W 85–64	11–5 (2–1)	Fifth Third Arena (643); Cincinnati, OH
01/14/2017; 2:00 pm		at Memphis	W 66–59	12–5 (3–1)	Elma Roane Fieldhouse (786); Memphis, TN
01/17/2017; 7:00 pm, ADN		SMU	W 67–65	13–5 (4–1)	Fifth Third Arena (523); Cincinnati, OH
01/21/2017; 2:00 pm, ADN		East Carolina	W 74–64	14–5 (5–1)	Fifth Third Arena (679); Cincinnati, OH
01/24/2017; 7:00 pm, ADN		at UCF	L 44–64	14–6 (5–2)	CFE Arena (2,406); Orlando, FL
01/28/2017; 2:00 pm, ADN		Tulane	L 68–74	14–7 (5–3)	Fifth Third Arena (909); Cincinnati, OH
02/01/2017; 7:00 pm, ADN		at No. 20 South Florida	L 52–72	14–8 (5–4)	USF Sun Dome (1,931); Tampa, FL
02/07/2017; 7:00 pm, SNY/ESPN3		No. 1 Connecticut	L 49–96	14–9 (5–5)	Fifth Third Arena (4,029); Cincinnati, OH
02/11/2017; 3:00 pm		at Houston	W 71–62	15–9 (6–5)	Hofheinz Pavilion (698); Houston, TX
02/15/2017; 8:00 pm		at Tulane	L 51–62	15–10 (6–6)	Devlin Fieldhouse (1,013); New Orleans, LA
02/18/2017; 3:00 pm, ESPN3		Memphis	W 68–57	16–10 (7–6)	Fifth Third Arena (1,170); Cincinnati, OH
02/22/2017; 7:00 pm		at East Carolina	L 69–80	16–11 (7–7)	Williams Arena (1,099); Greenville, NC
02/25/2017; 2:00 pm, ESPN3		at No. 23 Temple	L 64–88	16–12 (7–8)	McGonigle Hall (1,312); Philadelphia, PA
02/27/2017; 7:00 pm		Tulsa	L 61–78	16–13 (7–9)	Fifth Third Arena (624); Cincinnati, OH
American Athletic Conference Women's Tournament
03/03/2017; 6:00 pm, ESPN3	(7)	vs. (10) Houston; First Round	L 61–74	16–14	Mohegan Sun Arena; Uncasville, CT
*Non-conference game. ^{#}Rankings from AP Poll. (#) Tournament seedings in parentheses. All times are in EST.

== See also ==
- 2016–17 Cincinnati Bearcats men's basketball team
