= 2016–17 UCF Knights women's basketball team =

Intercollegiate basketball season

2016–17 UCF Knights women's basketball

WNIT, Second Round
- Conference: American Athletic Conference
- Record: 21–12 (9–7 The American)
- Head coach: Katie Abrahamson-Henderson (1st season)
- Assistant coaches: Tahnee Balerio; Tamisha Augustin; Nykesha Sales
- Home arena: CFE Arena

2016–17 American Athletic Conference women's basketball standings
	Conf.				Overall
Team	W		L	PCT	W		L	PCT
No. 1 UConn †	16	–	0	1.000	36	–	1	.973
Temple	13	–	3	.813	24	–	8	.750
South Florida	11	–	5	.688	24	–	9	.727
UCF	9	–	7	.563	21	–	12	.636
SMU	7	–	9	.438	19	–	15	.559
Tulane	7	–	9	.438	18	–	15	.545
Cincinnati	7	–	9	.438	16	–	14	.533
Memphis	7	–	9	.438	14	–	16	.467
Tulsa	5	–	11	.313	10	–	21	.323
Houston	4	–	12	.250	12	–	19	.387
East Carolina	2	–	14	.125	11	–	19	.367
† 2017 The American Tournament winner As of March 31, 2017; Rankings from AP poll

The 2016–17 UCF Knights women's basketball team represented the University of Central Florida during the 2016–17 NCAA Division I basketball season. The Knights competed in Division I of the National Collegiate Athletic Association (NCAA) and the American Athletic Conference (The American).

The Knights, in the program's 40th season of basketball, were led by first-year head coach Katie Abrahamson-Henderson, and played their home games at the CFE Arena on the university's main campus in Orlando, Florida. Under Coach Abe, the Knights earned their first 20-win season since 2010–11 as well as their first-ever WNIT bid. They finished the season 21–12, 9–7 in AAC play to finish in fourth place. They advanced to the semifinals of the American Athletic women's tournament, where they lost to Connecticut. They received an automatic bid to the Women's National Invitational Tournament, where they defeated Stetson in the first round before losing to Georgia Tech in the second round.

== Media ==
All UCF games had an audio or video broadcast available. For conference play, UCF games were typically available on ESPN3, AAC Digital, or UCF Knights All-Access. Road games not on ESPN3 or AAC Digital had an audio broadcast available on the UCF portal. All non-conference home games were streamed exclusively on UCF Knights All-Access. Select non-conference road games had a stream available through the opponent's website. The audio broadcast for home games was only available through UCF Knights All-Access.

== Roster ==
2016–17 UCF Knights women's basketball team
Players
Coaches

Pos.	#	Name	Height	Year	Previous school	Hometown
G	1	Christian Hithe	5 ft 9 in (1.75 m)	Fr	Spring Valley HS	Columbia, SC
G	2	Korneila Wright	5 ft 7 in (1.7 m)	Fr	Jones HS	Orlando, FL
G	4	Ashley Polacek	5 ft 5 in (1.65 m)	So	SPIRE Institute	Ottawa, ON
G	5	Ciara Thompson	6 ft 0 in (1.83 m)	Fr	West Orange HS	Winter Garden, FL
G	11	Kayla Thingpen	5 ft 8 in (1.73 m)	So	Palm Beach Lakes HS	West Palm Beach, FL
F	12	Nyala Shuler	6 ft 0 in (1.83 m)	RS So	Edgewater HS	Orlando, FL
F	32	Joslyn Massey	6 ft 0 in (1.83 m)	RS Sr	John Glenn HS; Purdue	Detroit, MI
G	22	Aliyah Gregory	5 ft 10 in (1.78 m)	Jr	Strawberry Crest	Tampa, FL
G	23	Zykira Lewis	5 ft 8 in (1.73 m)	Sr	Bartow HS	Bartow, FL
F	24	Fifi Ndour	6 ft 1 in (1.85 m)	Jr	Montverde Academy	Dakar, Senegal
F	25	Tolulope Omokore	5 ft 11 in (1.8 m)	So	Eleanor Roosevelt HS	Greenbelt, MD
G	33	Jamesha Paul	5 ft 8 in (1.73 m)	So	Dillard HS	Pompano Beach, FL

Head coach

- Katie Abrahamson-Henderson (Iowa)

Assistant coach(es)

- Tahnee Balerio (Missouri State)
- Isoken Uzamere (Hofstra)
- Nykesha Sales (Connecticut)

Legend

- (C) Team captain
- (S) Suspended
- (I) Ineligible
- (W) Walk-on
- Injured
- Current redshirt

Roster

== Schedule and results ==
Date time, TV	Rank^{#}	Opponent^{#}	Result	Record	Site (attendance) city, state
Non-conference regular season
11/11/2016*; 5:00 pm		at FIU	W 69–52	1–0	FIU Arena (598); Miami, FL
11/13/2016*; 2:00 pm		South Alabama	W 70–58	2–0	CFE Arena (2,303); Orlando, FL
11/16/2016*; 7:00 pm		at Davidson	W 57–38	3–0	John M. Belk Arena (371); Davidson, NC
11/19/2016*; 2:00 pm		Virginia Tech	L 64–67	3–1	CFE Arena (2,278); Orlando, FL
11/22/2016*; 7:00 pm		at Butler	W 66–59	4–1	Hinkle Fieldhouse (345); Indianapolis, IN
11/26/2016*; 2:30 pm		Rider; UCF Thanksgiving Classic	W 49–30	5–1	CFE Arena (2,217); Orlando, FL
11/27/2016*; 2:30 pm		Austin Peay; UCF Thanksgiving Classic	W 61–43	6–1	CFE Arena (2,342); Orlando, FL
12/01/2016*; 7:00 pm		at Buffalo	L 65–66	6–2	Alumni Arena (846); Amherst, NY
12/04/2016*; 2:00 pm		Bethune-Cookman	W 70–43	7–2	CFE Arena (2,416); Orlando, FL
12/10/2016*; 2:00 pm		Gardner–Webb	W 66–52	8–2	CFE Arena (2,256); Orlando, FL
12/17/2016*; 2:00 pm		at Georgia Southern	W 74–54	9–2	Hanner Fieldhouse (141); Statesboro, GA
12/20/2016*; 2:00 pm		Nebraska–Omaha	W 81–41	10–2	CFE Arena (2,391); Orlando, FL
12/28/2016*; 7:00 pm		UC Davis	L 71–77	10–3	CFE Arena (2,237); Orlando, FL
AAC regular season
01/01/2017; 1:00 pm, SNY/ESPN3		No. 1 Connecticut	L 48–84	10–4 (0–1)	CFE Arena (4,539); Orlando, FL
01/04/2017; 7:00 pm		at Cincinnati	L 57–62	10–5 (0–2)	Fifth Third Arena (360); Cincinnati, OH
01/07/2017; 2:00 pm		Memphis	L 62–65	10–6 (0–3)	CFE Arena (2,316); Orlando, FL
01/11/2017; 8:00 pm, ESPN3		at Houston	W 62–48	11–6 (1–3)	Hofheinz Pavilion (691); Houston, TX
01/18/2017; 7:00 pm, ADN		at East Carolina	W 54–42	12–6 (2–3)	Williams Arena (985); Greenville, NC
01/21/2017; 2:00 pm		Tulsa	L 62–73	12–7 (2–4)	CFE Arena (2,237); Orlando, FL
01/24/2017; 7:00 pm, ADN		Cincinnati	W 64–44	13–7 (3–4)	CFE Arena (2,406); Orlando, FL
01/28/2017; 6:00 pm		at Memphis	L 59–65	13–8 (3–5)	Elma Roane Fieldhouse (812); Memphis, TN
02/04/2017; 3:00 pm, ADN		at SMU	L 58–63	13–9 (3–6)	Moody Coliseum (1,011); Dallas, TX
02/08/2017; 7:00 pm		Houston	W 85–59	14–9 (4–6)	CFE Arena (2,901); Orlando, FL
02/11/2017; 2:00 pm, ADN		at Tulsa	W 62–58	15–9 (5–6)	Reynolds Center (449); Tulsa, OK
02/14/2017; 7:00 pm, ESPN3		at No. 22 South Florida; War on I–4	W 66–52	16–9 (6–6)	USF Sun Dome (1,884); Tampa, FL
02/18/2017; 2:00 pm, ADN		East Carolina	W 79–51	17–9 (7–6)	CFE Arena (2,453); Orlando, FL
02/22/2017; 8:00 pm, ADN		at Tulane	W 56–51	18–9 (8–6)	Devlin Fieldhouse (1,013); New Orleans, LA
02/25/2017; 2:00 pm		SMU	W 63–37	19–9 (9–6)	CFE Arena (2,348); Orlando, FL
02/27/2017; 7:00 pm		No. 25 Temple	L 60–66	19–10 (9–7)	CFE Arena (2,473); Orlando, FL
American Athletic Conference Women's Tournament
03/04/2017; 12:00 pm, ESPN3	(4)	vs. (5) Tulane; Quarterfinals	W 61–57	20–10	Mohegan Sun Arena; Uncasville, CT
03/05/2017; 5:00 pm, ESPN2	(4)	vs. (1) No. 1 Connecticut; Semifinals	L 56–78	20–11	Mohegan Sun Arena (6,491); Uncasville, CT
WNIT
03/16/2017*; 7:00 pm		Stetson; First Round	W 73–53	21–11	CFE Arena (676); Orlando, FL
03/19/2017*; 5:00 pm		at Georgia Tech; Second Round	L 51–63	21–12	Hank McCamish Pavilion (682); Atlanta, GA
*Non-conference game. ^{#}Rankings from AP Poll. (#) Tournament seedings in parentheses. All times are in Eastern Time.

== See also ==
- 2016–17 UCF Knights men's basketball team
