= 2017 American Athletic Conference women's basketball tournament =

- Tournament Logo
- Classification: Division I
- Season: 2016–17
- Teams: 11
- Site: Mohegan Sun Arena; Uncasville, Connecticut
- Champions: Connecticut (4th title)
- Winning coach: Geno Auriemma (4th title)
- MVP: Katie Lou Samuelson (Connecticut)
- Attendance: 24,797
- Television: ESPNU, ESPN2, ESPN3

2016–17 American Athletic Conference women's basketball standings
	Conf.				Overall
Team	W		L	PCT	W		L	PCT
No. 1 UConn †	16	–	0	1.000	36	–	1	.973
Temple	13	–	3	.813	24	–	8	.750
South Florida	11	–	5	.688	24	–	9	.727
UCF	9	–	7	.563	21	–	12	.636
SMU	7	–	9	.438	19	–	15	.559
Tulane	7	–	9	.438	18	–	15	.545
Cincinnati	7	–	9	.438	16	–	14	.533
Memphis	7	–	9	.438	14	–	16	.467
Tulsa	5	–	11	.313	10	–	21	.323
Houston	4	–	12	.250	12	–	19	.387
East Carolina	2	–	14	.125	11	–	19	.367
† 2017 The American Tournament winner As of March 31, 2017; Rankings from AP poll

The 2017 American Athletic Conference women's basketball tournament was a postseason tournament held from March 3–6, 2017 in the Mohegan Sun Arena in Uncasville, Connecticut. Connecticut received an automatic bid to the 2017 NCAA Division I women's basketball tournament.

== Seeds ==
All the teams in the American Athletic Conference qualified for the tournament. Teams were seeded based on conference record, and then a tiebreaker system was used. Teams seeded 6–11 played in the opening round, and teams seeded 1–5 received a bye to the quarterfinals.

Seed	School	Conference	Overall	Tiebreaker
1	Connecticut ‡	16–0	29–0	
2	Temple #	13–3	23–6	
3	South Florida #	11–5	22–7	
4	UCF #	9–7	19–10	
5	Tulane #	7–9	16–13	3–2 vs SMU/Cincinnati/Memphis, 1–0 vs SMU
6	SMU	7–9	16–13	3–2 vs Tulane/Cincinnati/Memphis, 0–1 vs Tulane
7	Cincinnati	7–9	16–13	3–3 vs Tulane/SMU/Memphis
8	Memphis	7–9	14–15	2–4 vs Tulane/SMU/Cincinnati
9	Tulsa	5–11	9–20	
10	Houston	4–12	11–18	
11	East Carolina	2–14	11–17	
‡ – American Athletic Conference regular season champions. # – Received a first-round bye in the conference tournament. Overall record are as of the end of the regular season.

== Schedule ==
All tournament games are nationally televised on an ESPN network:

Session	Game	Time*	Matchup^{#}	Television	Attendance
First round – Friday, March 3
1	1	4:00 PM	#8 Memphis vs. #9 Tulsa	ESPN3	4,446
1	2	6:00 PM	#7 Cincinnati vs. #10 Houston	ESPN3	4,446
1	3	8:00 PM	#6 SMU vs. #11 East Carolina	ESPN3	4,446
Quarterfinals – Saturday, March 4
2	4	12:00 PM	#4 UCF vs. #5 Tulane	ESPN3	5,513
2	5	2:00 PM	#1 Connecticut vs. #9 Tulsa	ESPN3	5,513
3	6	6:00 PM	#2 Temple vs. #10 Houston	ESPN3	4,559
3	7	8:00 PM	#3 South Florida vs. #6 SMU	ESPN3	4,559
Semifinals – Sunday, March 5
4	8	5:00 PM	#4 UCF vs. #1 Connecticut	ESPN2	6,491
4	9	7:30 PM	#2 Temple vs. #3 South Florida	ESPNU	6,491
Championship Game – Monday, March 6
5	10	7:00 PM	#1 Connecticut vs. #3 South Florida	ESPN2	6,488
*Game Times in EST. #-Rankings denote tournament seeding.

== Bracket ==
First round Friday, March 3
8	Memphis	55
9	Tulsa	60
7	Cincinnati	61
10	Houston	74
6	SMU	60
11	East Carolina	54

Quarterfinals; Saturday, March 4
1	Connecticut	105
9	Tulsa	57
4	UCF	61
5	Tulane	57
2	Temple	67
10	Houston	58
3	South Florida	62
6	SMU	55

Semifinals; Sunday, March 5
1	Connecticut	78
4	UCF	56
2	Temple	58
3	South Florida	63

Championship game Monday, March 6
1	Connecticut	100
3	South Florida	44

Note: * denotes overtime

== See also ==
- 2017 American Athletic Conference men's basketball tournament
