= 2016–17 Tulane Green Wave women's basketball team =

Intercollegiate basketball season

2016–17 Tulane Green Wave women's basketball
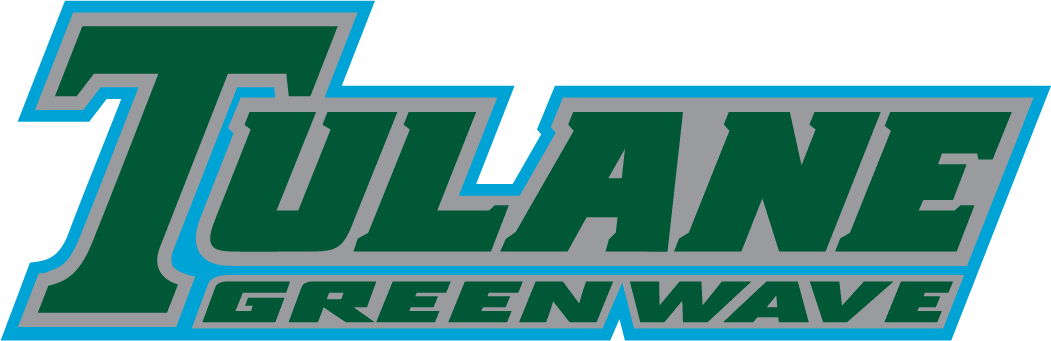

Tulane Classic Champions

WNIT, Third Round
- Conference: American Athletic Conference
- Record: 18–15 (7–9 The American)
- Head coach: Lisa Stockton (23rd season)
- Assistant coaches: Alan Frey; Doshia Woods; Beth Dunkenberger
- Home arena: Devlin Fieldhouse

2016–17 American Athletic Conference women's basketball standings
	Conf.				Overall
Team	W		L	PCT	W		L	PCT
No. 1 UConn †	16	–	0	1.000	36	–	1	.973
Temple	13	–	3	.813	24	–	8	.750
South Florida	11	–	5	.688	24	–	9	.727
UCF	9	–	7	.563	21	–	12	.636
SMU	7	–	9	.438	19	–	15	.559
Tulane	7	–	9	.438	18	–	15	.545
Cincinnati	7	–	9	.438	16	–	14	.533
Memphis	7	–	9	.438	14	–	16	.467
Tulsa	5	–	11	.313	10	–	21	.323
Houston	4	–	12	.250	12	–	19	.387
East Carolina	2	–	14	.125	11	–	19	.367
† 2017 The American Tournament winner As of March 31, 2017; Rankings from AP poll

The 2016–17 Tulane Green Wave women's basketball team represented Tulane University during the 2016–17 NCAA Division I women's basketball season. The Green Wave, led by 23rd year head coach Lisa Stockton, played their home games at Devlin Fieldhouse and were third year members of the American Athletic Conference. They finished the season 18–15, 7–9 in AAC play to finish in a 4-way tie for fifth place. They lost in the quarterfinals of the American Athletic women's tournament to UCF. They were invited to the Women's National Invitational Tournament where they defeated Texas-Arlington and Grambling State in the first and second rounds before losing to Alabama in the third round.

== Media ==
All Green Wave games will be broadcast on WRBH 88.3 FM. A video stream for all home games will be on Tulane All-Access, ESPN3, or AAC Digital. Road games will typically be streamed on the opponents website, though conference road games could also appear on ESPN3 or AAC Digital.

== Roster ==
2016–17 Tulane Green Wave women's basketball team
Players
Coaches

Pos.	#	Name	Height	Year	Previous school	Hometown
G	1	Shakira Harding	5 ft 7 in (1.7 m)	Sr	Vandrbilt Catholic; Hutchinson CC	Houma, LA
G	3	Kolby Morgan	5 ft 8 in (1.73 m)	Jr	John Curtis Christian	Hammond, LA
G	5	Kayla Manuirirangi	5 ft 8 in (1.73 m)	Jr	New Plymouth Girls'	Hawera, New Zealand
G	11	Leslie Vorpahl	5 ft 6 in (1.68 m)	Sr	Winston Churchill	San Antonio, TX
G	13	Caylah Cruickshank	5 ft 9 in (1.75 m)	Jr	Dawson College	Montreal, QE
F	15	Adesuwa Ebomwonyi	5 ft 10 in (1.78 m)	So	Hillgrove	Powder Springs, GA
G	22	Meredith Schulte	6 ft 0 in (1.83 m)	So	Mill Creek	Brasleton, GA
F	24	Maddison Wells	6 ft 1 in (1.85 m)	Fr	Chain of Lakes Collegiate	Winter Haven, FL
F	25	Harlyn Wyatt	6 ft 2 in (1.88 m)	So	Benjamin E. Mays	Atlanta, GA
G	33	Courtnie Latham	5 ft 11 in (1.8 m)	Sr	Clear Springs	Houston, TX
C	34	Ksenija Madzarevic	6 ft 5 in (1.96 m)	So	Rabun Gap Nacoochee	Novi Sad, Serbia
C	45	Brogan Jones	6 ft 4 in (1.93 m)	Fr	North Little Rock	Little Rock, AR

Head coach

- Lisa Stockton (Wake Forest)

Assistant coach(es)

- Alan Frey (New Orleans)
- Doshia Woods (Western Illinois)
- Beth Dunkenberger (Randolph–Macon)

Legend

- (C) Team captain
- (S) Suspended
- (I) Ineligible
- (W) Walk-on
- Injured
- Current redshirt

Roster

== Schedule and results ==
Date time, TV	Rank^{#}	Opponent^{#}	Result	Record	Site (attendance) city, state
Exhibition
11/08/2016*; 6:00 pm		Loyola (New Orleans)	W 75–43		Devlin Fieldhouse (442); New Orleans, LA
Non-conference regular season
11/12/2016*; 2:00 pm		Grambling State	W 79–56	1–0	Devlin Fieldhouse (652); New Orleans, LA
11/16/2016*; 7:00 pm		vs. No. 10 Mississippi State	L 49–66	1–1	Mississippi Coast Coliseum (1,724); Biloxi, MS
11/20/2016*; 2:00 pm		Southern Miss	W 86–67	2–1	Devlin Fieldhouse (812); New Orleans, LA
11/25/2016*; 2:00 pm		vs. Eastern Michigan; UTSA Thanksgiving Classic	W 62–50	3–1	Convocation Center; San Antonio, TX
11/27/2016*; 2:15 pm		at UTSA; UTSA Thanksgiving Classic	W 75–66	4–1	Convocation Center (544); San Antonio, TX
11/30/2016*; 7:00 pm		McNeese State	W 82–65	5–1	Devlin Fieldhouse (988); New Orleans, LA
12/03/2016*; 3:00 pm		at Middle Tennessee	L 59–62	5–2	Murphy Center (2,812); Murfreesboro, TN
12/05/2016*; 7:00 pm		at Vanderbilt	L 63–74	5–3	Memorial Gymnasium (2,297); Nashville, TN
12/11/2016*; 2:00 pm		at LSU	L 51–69	5–4	Maravich Center (2,164); Baton Rouge, LA
12/17/2016*; 2:00 pm		NC State	W 63–58	6–4	Devlin Fieldhouse (726); New Orleans, LA
12/21/2016*; 5:00 pm		Eastern Washington; Tulane Classic semifinals	W 63–51	7–4	Devlin Fieldhouse (820); New Orleans, LA
12/22/2016*; 5:00 pm		Auburn; Tulane Classic championship	W 61–59	8–4	Devlin Fieldhouse (873); New Orleans, LA
12/28/2016*; 2:00 pm		Maine	W 77–62	9–4	Devlin Fieldhouse (606); New Orleans, LA
Conference regular season
12/31/2016; 1:30 pm		at East Carolina	W 61–45	10–4 (1–0)	Williams Arena (903); Greenville, NC
01/04/2017; 7:00 pm, ESPN3		No. 22 South Florida	L 53–62	10–5 (1–1)	Devlin Fieldhouse (1,048); New Orleans, LA
01/08/2017; 5:00 pm, ESPNU		at Temple	L 71–86	10–6 (1–2)	McGonigle Hall (1,336); Philadelphia, PA
01/11/2017; 7:00 pm		at SMU	W 71–59	11–6 (2–2)	Moody Coliseum (758); Dallas, TX
01/14/2017; 2:00 pm, ESPN3		Houston	W 82–56	12–6 (3–2)	Devlin Fieldhouse (815); New Orleans, LA
01/22/2017; 12:00 pm, ESPN2		at No. 1 Connecticut	L 56–100	12–7 (3–3)	Gampel Pavilion (9,873); Storrs, CT
01/25/2017; 7:00 pm, ESPN3		Tulsa	W 70–65	13–7 (4–3)	Devlin Fieldhouse (1,187); New Orleans, LA
01/28/2017; 2:00 pm, ADN		at Cincinnati	W 74–68	14–7 (5–3)	Fifth Third Arena (909); Cincinnati, OH
01/31/2017; 7:00 pm		at Houston	W 57–49	15–7 (6–3)	Hofheinz Pavilion (556); Houston, TX
02/05/2017; 1:00 pm, CBSSN		Temple	L 50–76	15–8 (6–4)	Devlin Fieldhouse (1,351); New Orleans, LA
02/09/2017; 7:00 pm, ESPN3		Memphis	L 52–55	15–9 (6–5)	Devlin Fieldhouse (1,098); New Orleans, LA
02/12/2017; 11:00 am, ESPN2		at No. 22 South Florida	L 56–66	15–10 (6–6)	USF Sun Dome (2,047); Tampa, FL
02/15/2017; 7:00 pm		Cincinnati	W 62–51	16–10 (7–6)	Devlin Fieldhouse (1,013); New Orleans, LA
02/18/2017; 6:00 pm, SNY/ESPN3		No. 1 Connecticut	L 60–63	16–11 (7–7)	Devlin Fieldhouse (2,218); New Orleans, LA
02/22/2017; 7:00 pm, ADN		UCF	L 51–56	16–12 (7–8)	Devlin Fieldhouse (1,013); New Orleans, LA
02/27/2017; 7:00 pm, ESPN3		at Memphis	L 56–57	16–13 (7–9)	Elma Roane Fieldhouse (818); Memphis, TN
American Athletic Conference Women's Tournament
03/04/2017; 11:00 am, ESPN3	(5)	vs. (4) UCF; Quarterfinals	L 57–61	16–14	Mohegan Sun Arena; Uncasville, CT
Women's National Invitation Tournament
03/16/2017*; 7:00 pm		Texas–Arlington; First Round	W 62–53	17–14	Devlin Fieldhouse (717); New Orleans, LA
03/19/2017*; 4:00 pm		Grambling State; Second Round	W 66–49	18–14	Devlin Fieldhouse (760); New Orleans, LA
03/23/2017*; 7:00 pm		at Alabama; Third Round	L 64–72	18–15	Coleman Coliseum (1,054); Tuscaloosa, AL
*Non-conference game. ^{#}Rankings from AP Poll. (#) Tournament seedings in parentheses. All times are in Central Time.

== Rankings ==
Regular season polls
Poll	Pre- Season	Week 2	Week 3	Week 4	Week 5	Week 6	Week 7	Week 8	Week 9	Week 10	Week 11	Week 12	Week 13	Week 14	Week 15	Week 16	Week 17	Week 18	Week 19	Final
AP	NR	NR	NR	NR	NR	NR	NR	NR	NR	NR	NR	NR	NR	NR	NR	NR	NR	NR	NR	N/A
Coaches	NR	RV	RV	RV	NR	NR	RV	RV	RV	RV	RV	RV	RV	RV	NR	RV	NR	NR	NR	NR

Legend
	Increase in ranking
	Decrease in ranking
	Not ranked previous week
(RV)	Received Votes

== See also ==
- 2016–17 Tulane Green Wave men's basketball team
