= 2016–17 Temple Owls women's basketball team =

Intercollegiate basketball season

2016–17 Temple Owls women's basketball

NCAA Women's Tournament, first round
- Conference: American Athletic Conference

Ranking
- Coaches: No. 23
- Record: 24–8 (13–3 The American)
- Head coach: Tonya Cardoza (9th season)
- Assistant coaches: Way Veney; Willnett Crockett; C. J. Jones
- Home arena: Liacouras Center; McGonigle Hall

2016–17 American Athletic Conference women's basketball standings
| | Conf. | | | | Overall |
| Team | W | | L | PCT | W | | L | PCT |
|---|---|---|---|---|---|---|---|---|
| No. 1 UConn † | 16 | – | 0 | 1.000 | 36 | – | 1 | .973 |
| Temple | 13 | – | 3 | .813 | 24 | – | 8 | .750 |
| South Florida | 11 | – | 5 | .688 | 24 | – | 9 | .727 |
| UCF | 9 | – | 7 | .563 | 21 | – | 12 | .636 |
| SMU | 7 | – | 9 | .438 | 19 | – | 15 | .559 |
| Tulane | 7 | – | 9 | .438 | 18 | – | 15 | .545 |
| Cincinnati | 7 | – | 9 | .438 | 16 | – | 14 | .533 |
| Memphis | 7 | – | 9 | .438 | 14 | – | 16 | .467 |
| Tulsa | 5 | – | 11 | .313 | 10 | – | 21 | .323 |
| Houston | 4 | – | 12 | .250 | 12 | – | 19 | .387 |
| East Carolina | 2 | – | 14 | .125 | 11 | – | 19 | .367 |
† 2017 The American Tournament winner As of March 31, 2017; Rankings from AP poll

The 2016–17 Temple Owls women's basketball team represented Temple University during the 2016–17 NCAA Division I women's basketball season. The season marked the third for the Owls as members of the American Athletic Conference. The Owls, led by eighth year head coach Tonya Cardoza, played their home games at McGonigle Hall and the Liacouras Center. They finished the season 24–8, 13–3 in AAC play to finish in second place. They advanced to the semifinals of the American Athletic Conference women's tournament, where they lost to South Florida. They received at-large bid to the NCAA women's tournament, which was their first time since 2007, where they were upset by Oregon in the first round.

== Media ==
All Owls home games have video streaming on Owls TV, ESPN3, or AAC Digital. Road games are typically streamed on the opponent's website, though conference road games may also appear on ESPN3 or AAC Digital. There are no radio broadcasts for Owls women's basketball games.

== Roster ==
2016–17 Temple Owls women's basketball team
Players
Coaches

| Pos. | # | Name | Height | Year | Previous school | Hometown |
|---|---|---|---|---|---|---|
| G | 0 | Alliya Butts | 5 ft 4 in (1.63 m) | Jr | Holy Cross | Edgewater Park, NJ |
| F | 1 | Lena Niang (I) (redshirt) | 6 ft 2 in (1.88 m) | So | Rivedale Baptist; NC State | Bowie, MD |
| G | 2 | Feyonda Fitzgerald | 5 ft 7 in (1.7 m) | Sr | Lake Taylor | Norfolk, VA |
| G | 4 | Takora McIntyre | 5 ft 5 in (1.65 m) | Fr | Fenway | Dorchester, MA |
| C | 11 | Shannen Atkinson | 6 ft 4 in (1.93 m) | Fr | Smithfield | Smithfield, VA |
| F | 12 | Ruth Sherrill | 6 ft 0 in (1.83 m) | RS Sr | Thomas Edison; Hofstra | Alexandria, VA |
| G | 21 | Khadijah Berger | 5 ft 10 in (1.78 m) | Jr | Hampton | Hampton, VA |
| G | 22 | Tanaya Atkinson | 5 ft 9 in (1.75 m) | Jr | Hill Regional Career | New Haven, CT |
| G | 23 | Deja Reynolds | 5 ft 9 in (1.75 m) | So | Riverdale Baptist | Philadelphia, PA |
| F | 24 | Shantay Taylor | 6 ft 3 in (1.91 m) | Fr | Spring Valley | Columbia, SC |
| G | 32 | Donnaizha Fountain | 6 ft 0 in (1.83 m) | RS Jr | Cambridge Rindge & Latin; Georgia Tech | Roxbury, MA |
| F | 33 | Monasia Bolduc | 6 ft 1 in (1.85 m) | Sr | Nazareth Academy; Walters State | Clintondale, NY |
| C | 35 | Safiya Martin | 6 ft 4 in (1.93 m) | Sr | Sandy Creek | Fayetteville, GA |
| C | 42 | Taylor Robinson | 6 ft 4 in (1.93 m) | Sr | Ladue Horton Watkins | St. Louis, MO |

Head coach

- Tonya Cardoza (Virginia)

Assistant coach(es)

- Way Veney (College of Charleston)
- Willnett Crockett (Connecticut)
- C. J. Jones (Francis Marion)

Legend

- (C) Team captain
- (S) Suspended
- (I) Ineligible
- (W) Walk-on
- Injured
- Current redshirt

Roster

== Schedule and results ==
| Date time, TV | Rank^{#} | Opponent^{#} | Result | Record | Site (attendance) city, state |
Exhibition
| 11/05/2016*; 5:30 pm | | UDC | W 107–22 | | McGonigle Hall; Philadelphia, PA |
Regular season
| 11/11/2016*; 7:00 pm | | at Saint Joseph's | W 86–70 | 1–0 | Hagan Arena (934); Philadelphia, PA |
| 11/14/2016*; 5:00 pm | | La Salle | W 86–70 | 2–0 | McGonigle Hall (1,081); Philadelphia, PA |
| 11/19/2016*; 1:00 pm | | at No. 19 Florida | L 76–83 | 2–1 | Patriot Gym (540); Ocala, FL |
| 11/27/2016*; 2:00 pm | | Quinnipiac | W 71–68 | 3–1 | McGonigle Hall (1,159); Philadelphia, PA |
| 12/01/2016*; 7:00 pm | | at Harvard | L 62–73 | 3–2 | Lavietes Pavilion (437); Cambridge, MA |
| 12/04/2016*; 2:00 pm | | Vermont | W 53–39 | 4–2 | McGonigle Hall (1,404); Philadelphia, PA |
| 12/07/2016*; 5:30 pm | | at Hampton | L 65–71 | 4–3 | Hampton Convocation Center (1,274); Hampton, VA |
| 12/10/2016*; 1:00 pm | | at Villanova | W 83–48 | 5–3 | The Pavilion (441); Villanova, PA |
| 12/15/2016*; 9:00 pm, ESPNU | | No. 17 DePaul | W 84–74 | 6–3 | McGonigle Hall (721); Philadelphia, PA |
| 12/17/2016*; 2:00 pm | | at Rutgers | W 48–37 | 7–3 | Louis Brown Athletic Center (2,422); Piscataway, NJ |
| 12/22/2016*; 2:00 pm | | Fairfield | W 73–59 | 8–3 | McGonigle Hall (772); Philadelphia, PA |
| 01/01/2017; 6:00 pm, ESPN2 | | at Memphis | W 73–67 ^{OT} | 9–3 (1–0) | Elma Roane Fieldhouse; Memphis, TN |
| 01/04/2016*; 2:00 pm, ESPN3 | | at Kennesaw State | W 79–38 | 10–3 | KSU Convocation Center (406); Kennesaw, GA |
| 01/08/2017; 2:00 pm, ESPNU | | Tulane | W 86–71 | 11–3 (2–0) | McGonigle Hall (1,336); Philadelphia, PA |
| 01/11/2017; 7:00 pm, ADN | | East Carolina | W 78–47 | 12–3 (3–0) | McGonigle Hall (719); Philadelphia, PA |
| 01/14/2017; 3:00 pm, ADN | | at Tulsa | W 58–49 | 13–3 (4–0) | Reynolds Center (284); Tulsa, OK |
| 01/18/2017; 8:00 pm | | at Houston | W 69–57 | 14–3 (5–0) | Hofheinz Pavilion (533); Houston, TX |
| 01/21/2017; 2:00 pm, ESPN3 | | Memphis | W 66–51 | 15–3 (6–0) | McGonigle Hall (1,117); Philadelphia, PA |
| 01/25/2017*; 7:00 pm | | at Penn | W 63–53 | 16–3 | Palestra (414); Philadelphia, PA |
| 01/29/2017; 12:00 pm, CBSSN | | No. 23 South Florida | L 51–55 | 16–4 (6–1) | McGonigle Hall (1,271); Philadelphia, PA |
| 02/01/2017; 7:00 pm, SNY/ESPN3 | | No. 1 Connecticut | L 69–97 | 16–5 (6–2) | Liacouras Center (4,371); Philadelphia, PA |
| 02/05/2017; 2:00 pm, CBSSN | | at Tulane | W 76–50 | 17–5 (7–2) | Devlin Fieldhouse (1,351); New Orleans, LA |
| 02/08/2017; 12:00 pm, ADN | | Tulsa | W 70–43 | 18–5 (8–2) | Liacouras Center (3,402); Philadelphia, PA |
| 02/11/2017; 5:00 pm | | at East Carolina | W 76–43 | 19–5 (9–2) | Williams Arena (1,889); Greenville, NC |
| 02/15/2017; 7:00 pm | | SMU | W 66–52 | 20–5 (10–2) | McGonigle Hall (917); Philadelphia, PA |
| 02/19/2017; 1:00 pm, ESPN2 | | at No. 22 South Florida; Play 4Kay | W 77–71 | 21–5 (11–2) | USF Sun Dome (2,281); Tampa, FL |
| 02/22/2017; 7:00 pm, SNY/ESPN3 | No. 23 | at No. 1 Connecticut | L 45–90 | 21–6 (11–3) | XL Center (10,149); Hartford, CT |
| 02/25/2017; 2:00 pm, ESPN3 | No. 23 | Cincinnati | W 88–64 | 22–6 (12–3) | McGonigle Hall (1,312); Philadelphia, PA |
| 02/27/2017; 7:00 pm | No. 25 | at UCF | W 66–60 | 23–6 (13–3) | CFE Arena (2,473); Orlando, FL |
American Athletic Conference Women's Tournament
| 03/04/2017; 6:00 pm, ESPN3 | (2) No. 25 | vs. (10) Houston; Quarterfinals | W 67–58 | 24–6 | Mohegan Sun Arena (4,559); Uncasville, CT |
| 03/05/2017; 7:30 pm, ESPNU | (2) No. 25 | vs. (3) South Florida; Semifinals | L 58–63 | 24–7 | Mohegan Sun Arena (6,491); Uncasville, CT |
NCAA Women's Tournament
| 03/18/2017*; 6:30 pm, ESPN2 | (7 B) | vs. (10 B) Oregon; First Round | L 70–71 | 24–8 | Cameron Indoor Stadium; Durham, NC |
*Non-conference game. ^{#}Rankings from AP Poll. (#) Tournament seedings in parentheses. B=Bridgeport Region. All times are in Eastern Time.

== Rankings ==
Regular season polls
| Poll | Pre- season | Week 2 | Week 3 | Week 4 | Week 5 | Week 6 | Week 7 | Week 8 | Week 9 | Week 10 | Week 11 | Week 12 | Week 13 | Week 14 | Week 15 | Week 16 | Week 17 | Week 18 | Week 19 | Final |
|---|---|---|---|---|---|---|---|---|---|---|---|---|---|---|---|---|---|---|---|---|
| AP | RV | RV | NR | NR | NR | NR | NR | NR | NR | NR | RV | RV | RV | RV | RV | 23 | 25 | RV | RV | N/A |
| Coaches | RV | RV | RV | RV | NR | NR | RV | RV | RV | RV | RV | RV | RV | RV | 25 | 20 | 21 | 22 | 23 | RV |

Legend
| | Increase in ranking |
| | Decrease in ranking |
| | Not ranked previous week |
| (RV) | Received votes |

== See also ==
- 2016–17 Temple Owls men's basketball team
