= 2016–17 Houston Cougars women's basketball team =

Intercollegiate basketball season

2016–17 Houston Cougars women's basketball
- Conference: American Athletic Conference
- Record: 12–19 (4–12 The American)
- Head coach: Ronald Hughey (3rd season)
- Assistant coaches: Tai Dillard; Victoria Picott; Jamila Ganter
- Home arena: Hofheinz Pavilion

2016–17 American Athletic Conference women's basketball standings
	Conf.				Overall
Team	W		L	PCT	W		L	PCT
No. 1 UConn †	16	–	0	1.000	36	–	1	.973
Temple	13	–	3	.813	24	–	8	.750
South Florida	11	–	5	.688	24	–	9	.727
UCF	9	–	7	.563	21	–	12	.636
SMU	7	–	9	.438	19	–	15	.559
Tulane	7	–	9	.438	18	–	15	.545
Cincinnati	7	–	9	.438	16	–	14	.533
Memphis	7	–	9	.438	14	–	16	.467
Tulsa	5	–	11	.313	10	–	21	.323
Houston	4	–	12	.250	12	–	19	.387
East Carolina	2	–	14	.125	11	–	19	.367
† 2017 The American Tournament winner As of March 31, 2017; Rankings from AP poll

The 2016–17 Houston Cougars women's basketball team represented the University of Houston during the 2016–17 NCAA Division I women's basketball season. This was the Cougars' fourth season as members of the American Athletic Conference. The Cougars, led by third-year head coach Ronald Hughey, played their home games at Hofheinz Pavilion. They finished the season 12–19 overall, 4–12 in AAC play to finish in tenth place. As the No. 10 seed in the AAC tournament, they advanced to the quarterfinals, where they lost to Temple.

== Media ==
All Cougars games home and away are aired on the Houston Cougars IMG Sports Network, streamed online via the Houston Portal, with Gerald Sanchez and Louis Ray on the call. Before conference season home games streamed on Houston All-Access. Conference home games rotated between ESPN3, AAC Digital, and the Houston Portal. Road games typically were streamed on the opponents' websites, though some conference road games also appeared on ESPN3 or AAC Digital.

== Roster ==
2016–17 Houston Cougars women's basketball team
Players
Coaches

Pos.	#	Name	Height	Year	Previous school	Hometown
G	0	Angela Harris	5 ft 6 in (1.68 m)	Fr	Cy-Fair HS	Cypress, TX
G	1	Chyanne Butler	5 ft 6 in (1.68 m)	Jr	Junípero Serra HS; USC	Costa Mesa, CA
C	2	Jacqueline Blake	6 ft 2 in (1.88 m)	Sr	Coral Springs Acad. Miami Dade College	Miami, FL
F	3	Dorian Branch	5 ft 10 in (1.78 m)	Fr	Richardson HS	Dallas, TX
G	4	Jasmyne Harris	5 ft 8 in (1.73 m)	Fr	Brazosport HS	Freeport, TX
G	5	Dionna Collins	5 ft 5 in (1.65 m)	Sr	Del City; Redlands CC	Del City, OK
G	10	Cenecia Newman	5 ft 10 in (1.78 m)	So	Cedar Hill HS	Cedar Hill, TX
C	11	Natasha Mack	6 ft 3 in (1.91 m)	Fr	Lufkin HS	Lufkin, TX
F	12	Brianne Coffman	6 ft 3 in (1.91 m)	RS Jr	Jarrell; Oklahoma State	Jarrell, TX
G	14	Quatera Limbrick	5 ft 6 in (1.68 m)	Fr	Episcopal HS	Sugar Land, TX
G	23	Serithia Hawkins	5 ft 11 in (1.8 m)	So	Southmoore	Moore, OK
G	24	Mariah Mitchell	5 ft 9 in (1.75 m)	Jr	McKinney	McKinney, TX
G	25	Kierra Graves	5 ft 7 in (1.7 m)	Sr	Morgan Park; Kaskaskia College	Chicago, IL
C	32	Sharayla Brown	6 ft 3 in (1.91 m)	So	East Central	Tulsa, OK
F	35	Taylor Gilbert	6 ft 2 in (1.88 m)	RS Jr	Hightower	Missouri City, TX

Head coach

- Ronald Hughey (Limestone College)

Assistant coach(es)

- Tai Dillard (Texas)
- Victoria Picott (Rutgers)
- Jamila Ganter (Texas A&M)

Legend

- (C) Team captain
- (S) Suspended
- (I) Ineligible
- (W) Walk-on
- Injured
- Current redshirt

Roster

== Schedule and results ==
Date time, TV	Rank^{#}	Opponent^{#}	Result	Record	Site (attendance) city, state
Exhibition
11/06/2016*; 2:00 pm		St. Edward's	W 64–32		Hofheinz Pavilion; Houston, TX
Non-conference regular season
11/13/2016*; 4:00 pm		Southeastern Louisiana	W 83–80	1–0	Hofheinz Pavilion (1,411); Houston, TX
11/15/2016*; 8:00 pm		at UNLV	L 53–64	1–1	Cox Pavilion (1,060); Paradise, NV
11/20/2016*; 9:00 pm		at Long Beach State	L 55–65	1–2	Walter Pyramid (1,018); Long Beach, CA
11/23/2016*; 7:00 pm		Texas State	L 56–61	1–3	Hofheinz Pavilion (645); Houston, TX
11/25/2016*; 7:00 pm		Mercer	L 60–64	1–4	Hofheinz Pavilion (558); Houston, TX
11/30/2016*; 7:00 pm		at Texas–Rio Grande Valley	W 68–52	2–4	UTRGV Fieldhouse (836); Edinburg, TX
12/04/2016*; 2:00 pm		College of Charleston	W 79–63	3–4	Hofheinz Pavilion (565); Houston, TX
12/07/2016*; 11:00 am		at Texas Tech	L 60–84	3–5	United Supermarkets Arena (5,242); Lubbock, TX
12/10/2016*; 5:00 pm		Rutgers	W 53–51	4–5	Hofheinz Pavilion (671); Houston, TX
12/14/2016*; 11:00 am		at Louisiana–Lafayette	W 69–64	5–5	Cajundome (2,203); Lafayette, LA
12/19/2016*; 6:00 pm		at UTSA; Rae & Craig Blair Memorial Tournament	W 56–49	6–5	Convocation Center (200); San Antonio, TX
12/20/2016*; 4:00 pm		vs. Central Arkansas; Rae & Craig Blair Memorial Tournament	L 55–69	6–6	Convocation Center; San Antonio, TX
12/28/2016*; 7:00 pm		Alcorn State	W 85–70	7–6	Hofheinz Pavilion (704); Houston, TX
AAC regular season
01/01/2017; 3:30 pm, ESPNU		Tulsa	W 71–66	8–6 (1–0)	Hofheinz Pavilion (686); Houston, TX
01/07/2017; 1:00 pm		at Cincinnati	L 64–85	8–7 (1–1)	Fifth Third Arena (643); Cincinnati, OH
01/11/2017; 7:00 pm, ESPN3		UCF	L 48–62	8–8 (1–2)	Hofheinz Pavilion (691); Houston, TX
01/14/2017; 2:00 pm, ESPN3		at Tulane	L 56–82	8–9 (1–3)	Devlin Fieldhouse (815); New Orleans, LA
01/18/2017; 7:00 pm		Temple	L 57–69	8–10 (1–4)	Hofheinz Pavilion (533); Houston, TX
01/21/2017; 2:00 pm, ADN		SMU	L 45–66	8–11 (1–5)	Hofheinz Pavilion (957); Houston, TX
01/25/2017; 7:00 pm, ADN		at Memphis	L 65–66	8–12 (1–6)	Elma Roane Fieldhouse (1,432); Houston, TX
01/28/2017; 11:00 am, SNY/ESPN3		at No. 1 Connecticut	L 42–91	8–13 (1–7)	XL Center (12,316); Hartford, CT
01/31/2017; 7:00 pm		Tulane	L 49–57	8–14 (1–8)	Hofheinz Pavilion (556); Houston, TX
02/04/2017; 3:30 pm, ESPN3		at East Carolina	W 73–62	9–14 (2–8)	Williams Arena (1,014); Greenville, NC
02/08/2017; 6:00 pm		at UCF	L 59–85	9–15 (2–9)	CFE Arena (2,901); Orlando, FL
02/11/2017; 2:00 pm		Cincinnati	L 62–71	9–16 (2–10)	Hofheinz Pavilion (698); Houston, TX
02/15/2017; 7:00 pm		at Tulsa	W 65–62	10–16 (3–10)	Reynolds Center (391); Tulsa, OK
02/21/2017; 7:00 pm, ESPN3		South Florida	L 50–79	10–17 (3–11)	Hofheinz Pavilion (568); Houston, TX
02/25/2017; 2:00 pm		East Carolina	W 81–65	11–17 (4–11)	Hofheinz Pavilion (787); Houston, TX
02/27/2017; 7:00 pm, ADN		at SMU	L 45–74	11–18 (4–12)	Moody Coliseum (1,205); Dallas, TX
American Athletic Conference Women's Tournament
03/03/2017; 5:00 pm, ESPN3	(10)	vs. (7) Cincinnati; First Round	W 74–61	12–18	Mohegan Sun Arena; Uncasville, CT
03/04/2017; 5:00 pm, ESPN3	(10)	vs. (2) No. 25 Temple; Quarterfinals	L 58–67	12–19	Mohegan Sun Arena (4,559); Uncasville, CT
*Non-conference game. ^{#}Rankings from AP Poll. (#) Tournament seedings in parentheses. All times are in Central Time.

== See also ==
- 2016–17 Houston Cougars men's basketball team
