= 2016–17 UConn Huskies women's basketball team =

Intercollegiate basketball season

2016–17 UConn Huskies women's basketball

AAC tournament champions AAC regular season champions

NCAA tournament, Final Four
- Conference: American Athletic Conference

Ranking
- Coaches: No. 3
- AP: No. 1
- Record: 36–1 (16–0 The American)
- Head coach: Geno Auriemma (32nd season)
- Associate head coach: Chris Dailey
- Assistant coaches: Shea Ralph; Marisa Moseley
- Home arena: Harry A. Gampel Pavilion; XL Center

2016–17 American Athletic Conference women's basketball standings
| | Conf. | | | | Overall |
| Team | W | | L | PCT | W | | L | PCT |
|---|---|---|---|---|---|---|---|---|
| No. 1 UConn † | 16 | – | 0 | 1.000 | 36 | – | 1 | .973 |
| Temple | 13 | – | 3 | .813 | 24 | – | 8 | .750 |
| South Florida | 11 | – | 5 | .688 | 24 | – | 9 | .727 |
| UCF | 9 | – | 7 | .563 | 21 | – | 12 | .636 |
| SMU | 7 | – | 9 | .438 | 19 | – | 15 | .559 |
| Tulane | 7 | – | 9 | .438 | 18 | – | 15 | .545 |
| Cincinnati | 7 | – | 9 | .438 | 16 | – | 14 | .533 |
| Memphis | 7 | – | 9 | .438 | 14 | – | 16 | .467 |
| Tulsa | 5 | – | 11 | .313 | 10 | – | 21 | .323 |
| Houston | 4 | – | 12 | .250 | 12 | – | 19 | .387 |
| East Carolina | 2 | – | 14 | .125 | 11 | – | 19 | .367 |
† 2017 The American Tournament winner As of March 31, 2017; Rankings from AP poll

The 2016–17 UConn Huskies women's basketball team represented University of Connecticut (UConn) during the 2016–17 NCAA Division I women's basketball season. The Huskies, led by Hall of Fame head coach Geno Auriemma, in his 32nd season at UConn, played their home games at Harry A. Gampel Pavilion and the XL Center and were fourth year members of the American Athletic Conference. They finished the season 36–1, 16–0 in AAC play to win both the AAC regular season and tournament titles to earn an automatic trip to the NCAA women's tournament, where they defeated Albany and Syracuse in the first and second rounds, UCLA in the sweet sixteen and Oregon in the elite eight to reach their eighteenth final four where they lost on a game winning buzzer beater in overtime to Mississippi State ending a 111-game winning streak.

== Media ==
Every single Connecticut game is expected to be televised. Excluding exhibitions, most Connecticut games air on SNY, an ESPN network, or a CBS network. Exhibition games and games that air on SNY are also streamed on Husky Vision. Every game is expected to be broadcast on the UConn IMG Sports Network with an extra audio broadcast being available online to listen to through Husky Vision.

== Off-season ==
=== Departures ===
| Name | Number | Pos. | Height | Year | Hometown | Notes |
|---|---|---|---|---|---|---|
| Briana Pulido | 2 | G | 5'7" | Senior | Miami, FL | Graduated |
| Morgan Tuck | 3 | F | 6'2" | RS Junior | Bolingbrook, IL | Graduated/Declared to 2016 WNBA draft |
| Moriah Jefferson | 4 | G | 5'7" | Senior | Glenn Heights, TX | Graduated/Declared to 2016 WNBA draft |
| Courtney Ekmark | 22 | G | 6'0" | Sophomore | Phoenix, AZ | Transferred to Arizona State |
| Breanna Stewart | 30 | F | 6'4" | Senior | North Syracuse, NY | Graduated/Declared to 2016 WNBA draft |
| De'Janae Boykin | 35 | F | 6'2" | Freshman | Springdale, MD | Transferred to Penn State |

=== Incoming transfers ===
| Name | Number | Pos. | Height | Year | Hometown | Notes |
|---|---|---|---|---|---|---|
| Batouly Camara | 32 | F | 6'2" | Sophomore | New York, NY | Transferred from Kentucky. Under NCAA transfer rules, Camara will sit out for one year and be eligible to start at the beginning the 2017–18 season. Camara has three years of remaining eligibility. |
| Azurá Stevens | 23 | G/F | 6'6" | Junior | Raleigh, NC | Transferred from Duke. Under NCAA transfer rules, Stevens will sit out for one year and be eligible to start at the beginning the 2017–18 season. Stevens will have two years of remaining eligibility. |

=== Recruits ===
College recruiting information
| Name | Hometown | School | Height | Weight | Commit date |
|---|---|---|---|---|---|
| Crystal Dangerfield; PG | Murfreesboro, TN | Blackman | 5 ft 6 in (1.68 m) | N/A | |
| Crystal Dangerfield; PG | Recruit ratings: ESPN: (98) | | | | |
| Molly Bent; G | Centerville, MA | Tabor Academy | 5 ft 8 in (1.73 m) | N/A | |
| Molly Bent; G | Recruit ratings: ESPN: (90) | | | | |
| Kyla Irwin; P | Lemont, PA | State College | 6 ft 2 in (1.88 m) | N/A | |
| Kyla Irwin; P | Recruit ratings: ESPN: (90) | | | | |
Overall recruit ranking:
Note: In many cases, Scout, Rivals, 247Sports, On3, and ESPN may conflict in their listings of height and weight.; In these cases, the average was taken. ESPN grades are on a 100-point scale.; Sources: "2016 Player Commits". ESPN. Archived from the original on June 29, 2016.

== Roster ==
2016–17 Connecticut Huskies women's basketball team
Players
Coaches

| Pos. | # | Name | Height | Year | Previous school | Hometown |
|---|---|---|---|---|---|---|
| G | 5 | Crystal Dangerfield | 5 ft 5 in (1.65 m) | Fr | Blackman | Murfreesboro, TN |
| G | 10 | Molly Bent | 5 ft 9 in (1.75 m) | Fr | Tabor Academy | Centerville, MA |
| G | 11 | Kia Nurse | 6 ft 0 in (1.83 m) | Jr | St. Thomas More | Hamilton, ON |
| G | 12 | Saniya Chong | 5 ft 8 in (1.73 m) | Sr | Ossining | Ossining, NY |
| G | 15 | Gabby Williams | 5 ft 11 in (1.8 m) | Jr | Reed | Sparks, NV |
| G | 20 | Tierney Lawlor | 5 ft 7 in (1.7 m) | Sr | Ansonia | Ansonia, CT |
| G/F | 23 | Azurá Stevens (I) (redshirt) | 6 ft 6 in (1.98 m) | RS Jr | Duke | Raleigh, NC |
| G/F | 24 | Napheesa Collier | 6 ft 1 in (1.85 m) | So | Incarnate Word Academy | O'Fallon, MO |
| F | 25 | Kyla Irwin | 6 ft 2 in (1.88 m) | Fr | State College | Lemont, PA |
| F | 32 | Batouly Camara (I) (redshirt) | 6 ft 2 in (1.88 m) | RS So | Kentucky | New York, NY |
| G/F | 33 | Katie Lou Samuelson | 6 ft 3 in (1.91 m) | So | Mater Dei | Huntington Beach, CA |
| C | 51 | Natalie Butler | 6 ft 5 in (1.96 m) | RS Jr | Georgetown | Fairfax Station, VA |

Head coach

- Geno Auriemma (West Chester)

Assistant coach(es)

- Chris Dailey (Rutgers)
- Shea Ralph (Connecticut)
- Marisa Moseley (Boston University)

Legend

- (C) Team captain
- (S) Suspended
- (I) Ineligible
- (W) Walk-on
- Injured
- Current redshirt

Roster
Last update: 9/21/16

== Games ==
=== Exhibition ===
==== IUP ====
Connecticut took on the Division II Indiana University of Pennsylvania Crimson Hawks in their initial exhibition game. The Huskies started strong early, opening up a 13–2 lead in the opening minutes. The Crimson Hawks played roughly even over the next few minutes; the Huskies were leading 26–14 late in the first quarter. An 8–0 run to start the second quarter and a 14–0 run to start the second half helped extend the lead and Connecticut ended up with the win, 111–39. Katie Lou Samuelson was the leading scorer with 24 points for UConn while Carolyn Appleby was the leading scorer for IUP with 17 points.

==== Pace ====
The second, and final exhibition game of the season was against the Pace University Setters. The Huskies worked on their full-court press, which was effective against the Division II team, holding Pace to just three points in the first quarter against 35 for the Huskies. Connecticut continued the full-court pressure in the second quarter and led 59–9 at the half. In the third quarter, Connecticut stopped the press and let the Setters play in a half-court offense; Pace kept pace with Connecticut; each team scoring 13 in the third quarter. The final score, in favor of the Huskies 95–32. Pace's Kirsten Dodge was high scorer for the team with nine points. UConn's Gabby Williams had a double double scoring 24 points and securing 10 rebounds.

=== Regular season ===
==== Florida State (away) ====
The opening of the regular-season was a road game against Florida State University. The Seminoles were ranked 12th, but did not have Leticia Romero, who had played on the Olympic team from Spain which won the silver medal. The Huskies brought a 75-game winning streak into the game, although several key players from those teams had graduated. Florida State led by four points at halftime, only the fourth time that Connecticut trailed at the half in their streak. The Seminoles expanded the lead to seven; the largest deficit the Huskies had faced in the second half of the streak was two points, against Maryland the previous year. The Huskies had not had a player foul out the entire previous year but had two players with three fouls each by halftime, Katie Lou Samuelson and Gabby Williams. In the second half, Gabby Williams hit a three pointer, the first one of her career and Samuelson hit another three-pointer as part of a 14–2 run to give a five-point lead to UConn. The Huskies would extend the margin to eight points, but the Seminoles responded and cut the lead to a single point with under a minute to go. Brittany Brown was fouled attempting a three-pointer and went to the line with a three-point deficit, making two of three to cut the lead to a single point. She missed the third free-throw, which was knocked out of bounds by two players, one from each team. The referees called it Florida State's ball, and affirmed the call after a review. After inbounding, Shakayla Thomas tried to score but she was blocked by Naphessa Collier who then tapped the ball to Crystal Dangerfield. Florida State had one final chance, down by two points, but Imani Wright's three-point attempt missed the basket and Connecticut escaped with a two-point win, 78–76. Napheesa Collier had a career-high 28 points, while Saniya Chong added 16 points, 12 of which came in the fourth quarter.

==== Baylor (home) ====
Connecticut played Baylor in the first home game of the season. Baylor's AP ranking is #2 while Connecticut is #3. It is the first time since February 2015, when Connecticut faced South Carolina, that the Huskies were playing a team ranked ahead of them in a poll. Prior to the tip off, Connecticut unveiled the banner identifying the team as the 2016 NCAA champions. The Lady Bears scored twice before the Huskies first score. UConn responded and took a lead, but the lead changed hands repeatedly as the score remained close throughout the first half. Baylor missed a three-pointer near the end of the half, allowing UConn to go into halftime with a three-point lead 32–29. Baylor opened the second half with a seven-point run to take the lead. However, shortly after, the Huskies led by Chrystal Dangerfield and Gabby Williams went on an 18–4 run to give UConn a 10-point lead. The Lady Bears responded and tied the game at 54 with about 7 1/2 minutes remaining in the game. UConn then went on a 16–2 run to make the score 70–56 with about a minute left in the game. The game ended with UConn leading 72–61. The win extended the UConn winning streak to 77 consecutive games, the second longest streak in women's basketball history, behind only by UConn's 90 consecutive wins. Baylor's Alexis Jones had 23 points while UConn's Dangerfield came off the bench to score 19 points.

==== LSU (away) ====
UConn visited Baton Rouge for a game against LSU. The Lady Tigers kept the game close early, trailing by only 16–14. The Huskies opened up the game in the second quarter, hitting three consecutive three-pointers to extend the lead to 13 points. The Lady Tigers played roughly even in the second half, but the final score favored Connecticut 76–53. The final margin of 23 points was exactly half of the margin in the prior year's meeting in Connecticut where the Huskies won by 46 points. Katie Lou Samuelson was the leading scorer for the Huskies with 28 points on seven three-pointers.

==== Dayton (home) ====
Connecticut took on Dayton at home, the third time in history the two teams have met. The Huskies won both prior games, including the most recent game played in the Elite Eight game of the 2015 NCAA tournament. In that game, Dayton led at halftime, one of only three times in the last 127 games that UConn has trailed at halftime. The fans may have been thinking back to that game when Dayton was leading 10–5 just over four minutes into the game. Those thoughts dissipated when the Huskies scored the next 15 points. Connecticut expanded the lead until it reached a 20-point margin at halftime. The two teams played roughly even in the third quarter, but three-pointers by Nurse and Samuelson opened the fourth quarter to start another 15–0 run. When the final buzzer sounded, Connecticut won 98–65. Samuelson, who had set her career high with 28 points in the prior game, set a new career-high with 29 points. Williams had a double-double with 19 points and 11 rebounds, while Collier scored 22 points.

==== Chattanooga (home) ====
UConn played Chattanooga in the first regular-season game in Hartford. The Mocs led 5–0 and still led 14-13 late in the first quarter when Gabby Williams stole the ball and made a layup to put the Huskies ahead. UConn led by just 12 points at halftime, but after giving up the first basket of the second half, they scored 18 consecutive points. The Huskies won 80–43 giving them 80 consecutive wins. When asked about the 5 ranked teams in the upcoming schedule, Auriemma said "...we need to get our ass beat and soon and bad, so that some of our guys will come to realize that this is not as easy as they think it is".

==== DePaul (home) ====
Connecticut hosted 15th ranked DePaul at their campus arena. The Huskies hit their first nine shots, but it was the defense that impressed coach Auriemma as the team held the Blue Demons without a basket for almost 6 minutes. The score was 22–1 before the Blue Demons hit their first basket. Kia Nurse exceeded her best scoring output of the season in the first quarter, exceeded her prior career high in the second quarter, and ended with 33 points, a new career-high. Gabby Williams assisted on 10 baskets, a new career high. DePaul, who was leading the nation in made three-pointers, hit only seven of their 40 attempts. The Huskies had a 31-point lead at the end of the first quarter, and went on to win 91–46, recording their 81st consecutive victory.

==== Texas (neutral) ====
UConn faced 14th ranked Texas before a crowd of 9,014 at the Mohegan Sun Arena as part of the annual Jimmy V classic. The Longhorns dominated early, leading 10–6 at the first timeout of the quarter and 17–11 with just under two minutes to go in the quarter. Coach Auriemma thought the Texas was going to overwhelm Connecticut with their size and athletic ability. However, the Huskies responded with 11 consecutive points to take a five-point lead. They extended the lead to double digits and ended the half with a nine-point cushion. In the third quarter, Texas cut the lead to two and had a chance to tie or take the lead with the score at 51–49. After missing a shot that would have tied the game, Connecticut scored the next 12 points. Texas was unable to respond, and Connecticut came away with the win 72–54. Collier played virtually the entire game, not coming out until the final minute, scoring 24 points and pulling down eight rebounds.

==== Notre Dame (away) ====
The game between Notre Dame and Connecticut featured the teams ranked first and second in the AP and Coaches poll, with UConn holding the top position in the AP and the Irish holding the top position in the Coaches poll. The game was played at Notre Dame's Purcell Pavilion before a sellout crowd.

Notre Dame scored first, but Samuelson responded with a three-pointer to take the lead, a basket which would prove to be the only three-pointer of the game for the Huskies. That score was the first of several, as UConn opened up an 11–2 lead. Notre Dame responded, but UConn held a 23–14 lead at the end of the quarter. After UConn scored a basket to open the second quarter, the Irish scored nine consecutive points to close the gap to two points. Notre Dame added another 9–0 run to take a lead 34–30, although UConn scored the final four points of the half to tie the game at halftime. The second half also featured runs, with UConn scoring the first eight points of the second half, holding the Irish scoreless until after the media timeout, but the Irish responded with an eight-point run of their own to tie the game. However, Notre Dame would only score one more point in the quarter. Connecticut held a seven-point lead at the end of the third quarter, extended the lead to double digits in the final quarter and won the game 72–61.

Samuelson, Williams and Nurse each played the full 40 minutes for UConn. Williams was the player of the game with 19 points, 12 rebounds, 6 assists and 5 steals.

==== Kansas State (away) ====
The game between UConn and Kansas State, played at their court, was a sellout. The attendance of 12,528 is the largest announced attendance at a women's Division I basketball game this year. The Wildcats had an early lead, up 4–2, but the Huskies scored the next 17 points to quiet the crowd. Connecticut led by 19 at the end of the first quarter, but it did not turn out to be a blowout. Kansas State cut the lead to 11 in the third quarter before UConn scored ten consecutive points to open up a more comfortable margin. The Huskies won the game 75–58 to record their 84th consecutive victory. Samuelson led all scorers with 26 points, while Collier had 22 points, 8 rebounds, 6 steals and 5 blocks.

==== Ohio State (home) ====
The two top scorers for Connecticut each hoisted an airball in their first shot attempts against Ohio State. The Buckeye's Kelsey Mitchell seemed unstoppable, scoring 19 points in the first half including several dazzling plays. Despite this, the Huskies were still up by six points at halftime. They had led by as many as 12 but Ohio State Responding to Connecticut runs. The third quarter would be different, as both Collier and Samuelson were hitting their shots, and Connecticut outscored Ohio State 30–14. UConn switched defenders on Mitchell asking Dangerfield to take on the task and Mitchell scored only four points in the second half. UConn won, 82–63 extending their win streak to 85 games.

==== Nebraska (away) ====
The game against Nebraska was never close. The Huskers hit just one of their first 10 shot attempts, and the Huskies led 22–7 at the end of the first quarter. The lead grew to as many as 48 points, giving the team a chance to play extended minutes for the bench. The final score was 84–41 in favor of Connecticut, giving the Huskies their 86th consecutive victory.

==== Maryland (away) ====
In a battle of unbeaten teams, UConn took on the Maryland Terrapins in front of a sold-out crowd of 17,950 in Maryland. Samuelson was sick before and during the game, seriously enough that Geno Auriemma wasn't sure she was going to play, but she ended up playing 39 minutes. Although she missed several shots in the first half, she came on strong in the second half and led the team in scoring with 23 points. Nurse played all 40 minutes and scored 19 points. Both Collier and Williams committed fouls early and played significant portions of the second half with four fouls before Collier picked up her fifth and fouled out. The Huskies were leading by five points at halftime but opened up the third quarter with a 14–0 run in just over 2 1/2 minutes. They needed almost all of it, as Maryland came roaring back in the fourth quarter cutting the lead to five. With the lead down to six, Chong hit a key three-pointer late in the game to extend the margin to nine points. UConn won 87–81, recording its 87th consecutive victory and their 30th consecutive road victory.

==== UCF (away) ====
Connecticut opened the conference schedule with a game against UCF in Orlando. Although the Knights had improved under head coach Katie Abrahamson-Henderson, assisted by former UConn star Nykesha Sales, the team was no match for the Huskies, falling 84–48. Connecticut shot well, hitting over 60% of their field goals, and over 40% of their three-point attempts, but committed a season-high 21 turnovers. Collier hit 10 of her 11 field-goal attempts, leading to a team-high 22 points.

==== East Carolina (home) ====
UConn played their first conference home game against East Carolina. Chong hit a three-pointer in the opening seconds of the game and the Huskies never trailed. Collier was the leading scorer with 21 points.

==== South Florida (home) ====
UConn faced South Florida in Hartford with a chance to tie the consecutive wins record, set by Connecticut in 2010. At the time, the USF Bulls were the only other ranked team in the American conference. UConn scored 30 points in the first quarter and exceeded that with 35 in the second quarter, but it was the defense, holding South Florida to just six points in the first quarter, and 19 points by halftime, which impressed coach Auriemma. He told the team at halftime, that it ″was as good of a 20 minutes of basketball that any of them have ever been a part of". UConn won 102–37, the 90th consecutive victory for the team. Chong was the high scorer with 20 points.

==== SMU (away) ====
Following the record-tying 90th consecutive victory, UConn had a chance to seize the record outright against SMU. The Huskies were not interested in suspense, scoring the first 21 points in the game, and finishing with an 88–48 victory to set the new record. Both Collier and Williams recorded double-doubles, with 19 points and 16 rebounds for Collier and 19 and 10 for Williams. Samuelson scored 28 points to lead all scorers. Accolades came in from many observers, including Anucha Browne, the NCAA Vice President of Women's Basketball Championships, who remarked, "Congratulations to Geno Auriemma and the UConn Huskies on the sustained excellence it has taken to establish a new consecutive games won record. Even though they make it look easy at times, 91 wins and counting is an unbelievable accomplishment. It is saying something when you have broken the all-time consecutive games won record three times. To have won over 70 games in a row three times over the last 14 years is a testament to the UConn student-athletes, coaches, administrators and fans who continue to fuel the program."

==== Tulsa (away) ====
In their first game after setting the new NCAA consecutive wins record, UConn took on Tulsa at the Reynolds Center. The crowd of 1,391 was the smallest for a Huskies' game so far this season; on the other hand, it was the largest crowd to watch a women's basketball game in Tulsa, almost triple the next highest and well above the average attendance of 264. UConn never trailed, and collected their 92nd consecutive win by a score of 98–58. Samuelson set a career-high with 34 points; Williams recorded 13 points, nine rebounds, and eight assists.

==== Tulane (home) ====
Samuelson missed her first five shots from the floor, but she did not stop shooting. In the second and third quarters, she scored 32 points to lead all scorers. Samuelson, having scored 94 points in her last three games, tied a UConn record; Maya Moore scored 94 in a three-game stretch in December 2010. Samuelson also recorded seven steals, a career best. The Huskies did not trail during the game and ended up winning their 93rd consecutive game, 100–56.

==== East Carolina (away) ====
The game against East Carolina was notable more for milestones than for the game itself. In the third quarter, Nurse hit a basket to give her a thousand points in her career. In the fourth quarter, Williams found Natalie Butler for a basket, giving her a triple-double with 16 points, 16 rebounds and 10 assists, the fifth triple-double in UConn women's basketball history. The team went on to win the game 91–44, resulting in an NCAA record 94th consecutive win, as well as the 34th consecutive road game, tying the NCAA record set by UConn in 2004.

==== Houston (home) ====
Four minutes into the game, Houston grabbed a two-point lead, the first time UConn had trailed since December 11, 2016. The Huskies then went on a 21-0 run to take control of the game. Williams recorded a double-double with 19 points and 10 rebounds, while Samuelson and Nurse scored 16 points apiece. The Huskies won 91-42, their 95th consecutive game.

==== Temple (away) ====
UConn traveled to the Liacouras Center in Philadelphia to face Temple, coached by former UConn assistant Tonya Cardoza. In the first half, UConn hit 77% of their shot attempts, and held Temple to 18 points, prompting head coach Auriemma to remark, "I can't think of one thing when we went in at halftime that I could've said, 'We need to do a better job.' That was about as good a first half as we've played, ..." The Huskies won 97–69, marking their 35th consecutive road win, a new NCAA record, as well as extending their overall win streak to 96. Collier had a double-double with 24 points and 10 rebounds; Samuelson added 25 points.

==== Tulsa (home) ====
The Huskies shot poorly early in the game against Tulsa, hitting only 33% of their shots in the first quarter. Nevertheless, the team took a lead it would never relinquish, extending a five-point first quarter lead to 17 at halftime. Shots started falling, and the team hit 57% of their field goal attempts for the game. Collier hit 10 of her 13 attempts, raising her season average to 67.5%, good for first in the conference. The final score was 96-50 in favor of Connecticut.

==== Cincinnati (away) ====
UConn faced Cincinnati at Fifth Third Arena before 4029 fans, the largest Cincinnati crowd of the season by far. The Bearcats, under head coach Jamelle Elliott, a former UConn assistant, were having their best season in years, with a 14–9 record, but were no match for Connecticut. UConn's Collier took ten shots and hit all ten, as well as recording 12 rebounds, five blocks and six assists. Three other starters scored in double figures, while Chong added 9. The Huskies claimed their 98th consecutive victory, 96–49. The Huskies also set a new NCAA record for consecutive road victories at 36.

==== SMU (home) ====
Having previously defeated SMU by 40 in Dallas, the outcome of the home game against SMU was not the uppermost issue. Samuelson had been unable to practice for the last two days due to illness, and her status was unknown even as game time neared. She did end up playing, and played all 20 minutes of the first half, scoring 19 points. Williams reached 200 rebounds, 100 assists, 50 steals, and 25 blocks for the season, becoming only the third Husky to accomplish this, along with Maya Moore (who was in attendance) and Breanna Stewart. Williams became the first Division I player to reach that milestone in the 2016-2017. UConn won the game 83-41 to extend their winning streak to 99 games.

==== South Carolina (home) ====
After a dozen AAC games, in which the margin of victory was never less than 28 points, UConn faced sixth ranked South Carolina before a sellout crowd of 10,167. The game was close in the first half, with South Carolina trailing by no more than four. The Gamecocks were led by A'ja Wilson, who hit five of her eight shots to record 12 points in the first half. UConn recorded a 7–0 run in the end of the half to take a six-point lead at halftime. After South Carolina cut the lead back to three points, the Huskies went on an 11–2 run to end the quarter. The Gamecocks could not trim the margin to single digits in the fourth quarter, and the Huskies went on to win their 100th consecutive game by a score of 66–55. Williams scored 26 points to record a career-high. Watching the game in the stands were former UConn stars Sue Bird, Maya Moore, Tina Charles and Breanna Stewart.

==== Tulane (away) ====
After defeating South Carolina in non-conference play, the Huskies returned to conference play against Tulane, still having never lost a game in conference history. UConn started the game on a 10–0 run, but had their worst shooting game of the season, hitting only 38% of their field-goal attempts. The Huskies led by as many as 17 points in the third quarter, but Tulane did not fade. Collier was in foul trouble and had to sit in the third quarter and played with four fouls in the fourth quarter. Tulane hit 7 of 16 field goal attempts in the fourth quarter, cutting the lead to three points. Tulane had the ball for the final possession down just 3, but was unable to get a clear shot before time expired. Nurse did not play for the Huskies, sitting out with an ankle injury, after starting 73 consecutive games. Despite her foul problems and minimal playing time, Collier had a double-double with 26 points and 12 rebounds. UConn held on to win their 101st consecutive game by a score of 63–60, their narrowest margin of victory since their 2-point win against Florida State on opening night.

==== Temple (home) ====
Following the close game against Tulane, UConn returned home to take on Temple, winners of four of their last five and ranked for the first time in a decade. Samuelson had six steals, Williams hit all seven of her field-goal attempts and added seven rebounds, while Collier recorded 31 points, a career-high, hitting 13 of her 14 field-goal attempts, including two three-pointers. The team hit 59% of their field-goal attempts and held the Owls to 27%, winning easily by a score of 90–45.

==== Memphis (home) ====
UConn faced Memphis on Senior Day, honoring their two seniors Saniya Chong and Tierney Lawler in pregame ceremonies. Lawler started for the first time in her career and assisted on a pass to Samuelson which resulted in a four-point play on the first possession of the game. Samuelson came into the game having hit just 11 of her previous 44 three-point attempts, but she hit five of her eight attempts in this game. The team hit 55% of their field-goal attempts while holding Memphis to 32%. UConn would go on to win their 103rd straight game, 91–48.

==== USF (away) ====
UConn closed the regular-season in the same way they opened it — with a trip to Florida. In the opening game, the Huskies escaped with a two-point win over Florida State; in the final regular-season game, they won by 28 points, 96–68, over South Florida. Collier hit 15 of her 19 field-goal attempts, including two of three 3 point attempts, and hit seven of her eight free-throw attempts to record 39 points, the fourth most ever by UConn player. Only Nykesha Sales who scored 46 points in 1997 and Maya Moore, who scored 40 and 41 points during her career, had higher point totals. Samuelson scored 16 to join the career 1000 point club.

=== AAC tournament ===
==== Tulsa (quarter-final) ====
After a first round bye, UConn faced Tulsa in the AAC quarterfinals. The game was close early on, with UConn holding only a four-point lead 14–10, but UConn put the game away with a 37-7 run. Collier hit seven of her nine field-goal attempts and led all scorers with 24 points. UConn ended up with 105 points, matching the total of their win streak. The final score was 105–57.

==== UCF (semifinal) ====
UConn took on the University of Central Florida in the semifinal game of the tournament. Although the Huskies uncharacteristically missed a number of shots, missing 12 of the 17 shots in the second quarter, they improved in the second half and extended the 12 point halftime lead to more than 20 points. The Knights were aggressive in the paint, recording six offensive rebounds in the first quarter, but were unable to convert enough rebounds to take the lead. The Huskies ended up with the win 78–56 to advance to the championship game.

==== South Florida (Championship) ====
The championship game was between UConn and South Florida. Under usual circumstances, the result of a conference tournament game would be the main story. In this case, the Huskies won the game easily 100–44 to win the American conference championship and keep two streaks alive — they've never lost a game against an American conference opponent and they have now won 107 consecutive games. Both of those accomplishments were overshadowed by Samuelson who took 10 field-goal attempts from beyond the heart arc and hit every one of them. She left the game with just over two minutes left in the third quarter to a "thunderous ovation". The 10-for-10 from beyond the arc establishes a new record for NCAA women's basketball is the most three-point shots made without a miss. One men's basketball player, Andre Smith, hit 10 of 10 in 2008 in a men's NCAA game. No NBA player has ever accomplished the feat.

Samuelson ended up with 40 points, establishing a new career high, and the most points ever scored in an American athletic conference tournament game. It was the fourth 40 point performance in the history of UConn with only Nykesha Sales who scored 46 and Maya Moore, with two games, one with 41 points and the other, 40 points.

=== NCAA tournament ===
Connecticut took on the America East champion, in a first-round game between the top-seeded Huskies and the 16 seed Albany. The Huskies scored the first nine points, but the great Danes cut the lead to three points 10–7 early in the first quarter. Despite leading 58–32 at halftime, the halftime discussion among the players was how to boost their intensity on defense. The Huskies held Albany to 23 points in the second half and went on to win the game 116-55.

The Huskies went on to beat Syracuse, UCLA, and Oregon before falling to No. 7 Mississippi State with a buzzer beater in overtime in the final four. The loss ended the Huskies record winning streak with 111 wins.

== Schedule ==
| Date time, TV | Rank^{#} | Opponent^{#} | Result | Record | High points | High rebounds | High assists | Site (attendance) city, state |
Exhibition
| 11/01/2016*; 7:00 pm, HuskyVision | No. 3 | IUP | W 111–39 | | 24 – Samuelson | 9 – Tied | 6 – Williams | Gampel Pavilion (4,419); Storrs, CT |
| 11/06/2016*; 1:00 pm, HuskyVision | No. 3 | Pace | W 95–32 | | 24 – Williams | 11 – Collier | 6 – Bent | XL Center (5,623); Hartford, CT |
Regular season
| 11/14/2016*; 6:00 pm, ESPN2 | No. 3 | at No. 12 Florida State; College Hoops Tip-Off Marathon | W 78–76 | 1–0 | 28 – Collier | 8 – Collier | 6 – Chong | Donald L. Tucker Center (4,753); Tallahassee, FL |
| 11/17/2016*; 7:30 pm, SNY | No. 3 | No. 2 Baylor | W 72–61 | 2–0 | 19 – Dangerfield | 11 – Collier | 6 – Nurse | Gampel Pavilion (9,049); Storrs, CT |
| 11/20/2016*; 5:30 pm, ESPN | No. 3 | at LSU | W 76–53 | 3–0 | 28 – Samuelson | 10 – Williams | 8 – Nurse | Maravich Center (3,806); Baton Rouge, LA |
| 11/22/2016*; 7:00 pm, SNY | No. 2 | Dayton | W 98–65 | 4–0 | 29 – Samuelson | 11 – Williams | 9 – Dangerfield | Gampel Pavilion (6,443); Storrs, CT |
| 11/29/2016*; 7:00 pm, SNY | No. 2 | Chattanooga | W 80–43 | 5–0 | 23 – Collier | 10 – Williams | 5 – Chong | XL Center (6,090); Hartford, CT |
| 12/01/2016*; 7:00 pm, SNY | No. 2 | No. 15 DePaul | W 91–46 | 6–0 | 33 – Nurse | 7 – Tied | 10 – Williams | Gampel Pavilion (6,716); Storrs, CT |
| 12/04/2016*; 4:00 pm, ESPN | No. 2 | vs. No. 14 Texas; Jimmy V Classic | W 72–54 | 7–0 | 24 – Collier | 8 – Collier | 6 – Williams | Mohegan Sun Arena (9,014); Uncasville, CT |
| 12/07/2016*; 7:00 pm, ESPN2 | No. 1 | at No. 2 Notre Dame; Rivalry | W 72–61 | 8–0 | 20 – Collier | 12 – Williams | 6 – Williams | Edmund P. Joyce Center (9,149); South Bend, IN |
| 12/11/2016*; 2:00 pm, FS1 | No. 1 | at Kansas State | W 75–58 | 9–0 | 26 – Samuelson | 10 – Williams | 5 – 3 tied | Bramlage Coliseum (12,528); Manhattan, KS |
| 12/19/2016*; 7:00 pm, CBSSN | No. 1 | No. 12 Ohio State | W 82–63 | 10–0 | 27 – Collier | 12 – Williams | 7 – Williams | XL Center (9,379); Hartford, CT |
| 12/21/2016*; 9:00 pm, BTN | No. 1 | at Nebraska | W 84–41 | 11–0 | 23 – Samuelson | 15 – Collier | 4 – Tied | Pinnacle Bank Arena (7,553); Lincoln, NE |
| 12/29/2016*; 6:00 pm, ESPN2 | No. 1 | at No. 4 Maryland | W 87–81 | 12–0 | 23 – Samuelson | 9 – Williams | 5 – 3 tied | Xfinity Center (17,950); College Park, MD |
| 01/01/2017; 1:00 pm, SNY | No. 1 | at UCF | W 84–48 | 13–0 (1–0) | 22 – Collier | 7 – Samuelson | 5 – Tied | CFE Arena (4,539); Orlando, FL |
| 01/04/2017; 7:00 pm, SNY | No. 1 | East Carolina | W 90–45 | 14–0 (2–0) | 21 – Collier | 7 – Collier | 5 – Williams | XL Center (8,452); Hartford, CT |
| 01/10/2017; 7:00 pm, CBSSN | No. 1 | No. 20 South Florida | W 102–37 | 15–0 (3–0) | 20 – Chong | 13 – Williams | 8 – Chong | XL Center (10,109); Hartford, CT |
| 01/14/2017; 3:00 pm, SNY | No. 1 | at SMU | W 88–48 | 16–0 (4–0) | 28 – Samuelson | 16 – Collier | 6 – Williams | Moody Coliseum (3,878); Dallas, TX |
| 01/17/2017; 8:00 pm, SNY | No. 1 | at Tulsa | W 98–58 | 17–0 (5–0) | 34 – Samuelson | 13 – Collier | 8 – Williams | Reynolds Center (1,391); Tulsa, OK |
| 01/22/2017; 1:00 pm, ESPN2 | No. 1 | Tulane | W 100–56 | 18–0 (6–0) | 32 – Samuelson | 8 – Butler | 6 – Williams | Gampel Pavilion (9,873); Storrs, CT |
| 01/24/2017; 7:00 pm, SNY | No. 1 | at East Carolina | W 91–44 | 19–0 (7–0) | 20 – Samuelson | 16 – Williams | 10 – Williams | Williams Arena (2,880); Greenville, NC |
| 01/28/2017; 12:00 pm, SNY | No. 1 | Houston | W 91–42 | 20–0 (8–0) | 19 – Williams | 10 – Tied | 8 – Nurse | XL Center (12,316); Hartford, CT |
| 02/01/2017; 7:00 pm, SNY | No. 1 | at Temple | W 97–69 | 21–0 (9–0) | 25 – Collier | 10 – Collier | 6 – Tied | Liacouras Center (4,371); Philadelphia, PA |
| 02/05/2017; 1:00 pm, SNY | No. 1 | Tulsa | W 96–50 | 22–0 (10–0) | 24 – Collier | 9 – Collier | 7 – Chong | Gampel Pavilion (9,347); Storrs, CT |
| 02/07/2017; 7:00 pm, SNY | No. 1 | at Cincinnati | W 96–49 | 23–0 (11–0) | 24 – Collier | 12 – Collier | 6 – Tied | Fifth Third Arena (4,029); Cincinnati, OH |
| 02/11/2017; 2:00 pm, SNY | No. 1 | SMU | W 83–41 | 24–0 (12–0) | 22 – Samuelson | 13 – Collier | 7 – Chong | Gampel Pavilion (10,012); Storrs, CT |
| 02/13/2017*; 9:00 pm, ESPN2 | No. 1 | No. 6 South Carolina | W 66–55 | 25–0 | 26 – Williams | 14 – Williams | 7 – Dangerfield | Gampel Pavilion (10,167); Storrs, CT |
| 02/18/2017; 7:00 pm, SNY | No. 1 | at Tulane | W 63–60 | 26–0 (13–0) | 26 – Collier | 14 – Williams | 5 – Williams | Devlin Fieldhouse (2,218); New Orleans, LA |
| 02/22/2017; 7:00 pm, SNY | No. 1 | No. 23 Temple | W 90–45 | 27–0 (14–0) | 31 – Collier | 13 – Collier | 7 – Samuelson | XL Center (10,149); Hartford, CT |
| 02/25/2017; 4:00 pm, SNY | No. 1 | Memphis | W 91–48 | 28–0 (15–0) | 29 – Samuelson | 10 – Williams | 7 – Chong | Gampel Pavilion (10,167); Storrs, CT |
| 02/27/2017; 7:00 pm, ESPN2 | No. 1 | at South Florida | W 96–68 | 29–0 (16–0) | 39 – Collier | 12 – Collier | 9 – Dangerfield | USF Sun Dome (5,948); Tampa, FL |
AAC Women's Tournament
| 03/04/2017; 2:00 pm, ESPN3 | (1) No. 1 | vs. (9) Tulsa; Quarterfinals | W 105–57 | 30–0 | 24 – Collier | 9 – Butler | 7 – Dangerfield | Mohegan Sun Arena (5,513); Uncasville, CT |
| 03/05/2017; 5:00 pm, ESPN2 | (1) No. 1 | vs. (4) UCF; Semifinals | W 78–56 | 31–0 | 16 – Tied | 12 – Collier | 5 – Samuelson | Mohegan Sun Arena (6,491); Uncasville, CT |
| 03/06/2017; 7:00 pm, ESPN2 | (1) No. 1 | vs. (3) South Florida; Championship | W 100–44 | 32–0 | 40 – Samuelson | 10 – Butler | 6 – Tied | Mohegan Sun Arena (6,488); Uncasville, CT |
NCAA Women's Tournament
| 03/18/2017*; 11:00 am, ESPN2 | (1 B) No. 1 | (16 B) Albany; First Round | W 116–55 | 33–0 | 24 – Tied | 10 – Tied | 9 – Samuelson | Gampel Pavilion (5,670); Storrs, CT |
| 03/20/2017*; 6:35 pm, ESPN2 | (1 B) No. 1 | (8 B) No. 21 Syracuse; Second Round | W 94–64 | 34–0 | 29 – Nurse | 7 – Collier | 7 – Chong | Gampel Pavilion (8,274); Storrs, CT |
| 03/25/2017*; 1:30 pm, ESPN | (1 B) No. 1 | vs. (4 B) No. 15 UCLA; Sweet Sixteen | W 86–71 | 35–0 | 27 – Collier | 14 – Collier | 6 – Williams | Webster Bank Arena (8,830); Bridgeport, CT |
| 03/27/2017*; 7:00 pm, ESPN | (1 B) No. 1 | vs. (10 B) Oregon; Elite Eight | W 90–52 | 36–0 | 28 – Collier | 12 – Collier | 7 – Nurse | Webster Bank Arena (8,978); Bridgeport, CT |
| 03/31/2017*; 9:30 pm, ESPN2 | (1 B) No. 1 | vs. (2 O) No. 7 Mississippi State; Final Four | L 64–66 ^{OT} | 36–1 | 21 – Williams | 8 – Tied | 5 – Chong | American Airlines Center (19,202); Dallas, TX |
*Non-conference game. ^{#}Rankings from AP Poll. (#) Tournament seedings in parentheses. B=Bridgeport Region. All times are in EST.

== Rankings ==
Regular season polls
| Poll | Pre- Season | Week 2 | Week 3 | Week 4 | Week 5 | Week 6 | Week 7 | Week 8 | Week 9 | Week 10 | Week 11 | Week 12 | Week 13 | Week 14 | Week 15 | Week 16 | Week 17 | Week 18 | Week 19 | Final |
|---|---|---|---|---|---|---|---|---|---|---|---|---|---|---|---|---|---|---|---|---|
| AP | 3 | 3 | 2 | 2 | 1 | 1 | 1 | 1 | 1 | 1 | 1 | 1 | 1 | 1 | 1 | 1 | 1 | 1 | 1 | N/A |
| Coaches | 1 | 2 | 2 | 2 | 2 | 1 | 1 | 1 | 1 | 1 | 1 | 1 | 1 | 1 | 1 | 1 | 1 | 1 | 1 | 3 |

Legend
| | Increase in ranking |
| | Decrease in ranking |
| | Not ranked previous week |
| (RV) | Received Votes |
