= 2016–17 Tulsa Golden Hurricane women's basketball team =

Intercollegiate basketball season

2016–17 Tulsa Golden Hurricane women's basketball
- Conference: American Athletic Conference
- Record: 10–21 (5–11 The American)
- Head coach: Matilda Mossman (6th season)
- Assistant coaches: Shane Coffey; Megan Robbins; Leah Foster
- Home arena: Reynolds Center

2016–17 American Athletic Conference women's basketball standings
| | Conf. | | | | Overall |
| Team | W | | L | PCT | W | | L | PCT |
|---|---|---|---|---|---|---|---|---|
| No. 1 UConn † | 16 | – | 0 | 1.000 | 36 | – | 1 | .973 |
| Temple | 13 | – | 3 | .813 | 24 | – | 8 | .750 |
| South Florida | 11 | – | 5 | .688 | 24 | – | 9 | .727 |
| UCF | 9 | – | 7 | .563 | 21 | – | 12 | .636 |
| SMU | 7 | – | 9 | .438 | 19 | – | 15 | .559 |
| Tulane | 7 | – | 9 | .438 | 18 | – | 15 | .545 |
| Cincinnati | 7 | – | 9 | .438 | 16 | – | 14 | .533 |
| Memphis | 7 | – | 9 | .438 | 14 | – | 16 | .467 |
| Tulsa | 5 | – | 11 | .313 | 10 | – | 21 | .323 |
| Houston | 4 | – | 12 | .250 | 12 | – | 19 | .387 |
| East Carolina | 2 | – | 14 | .125 | 11 | – | 19 | .367 |
† 2017 The American Tournament winner As of March 31, 2017; Rankings from AP poll

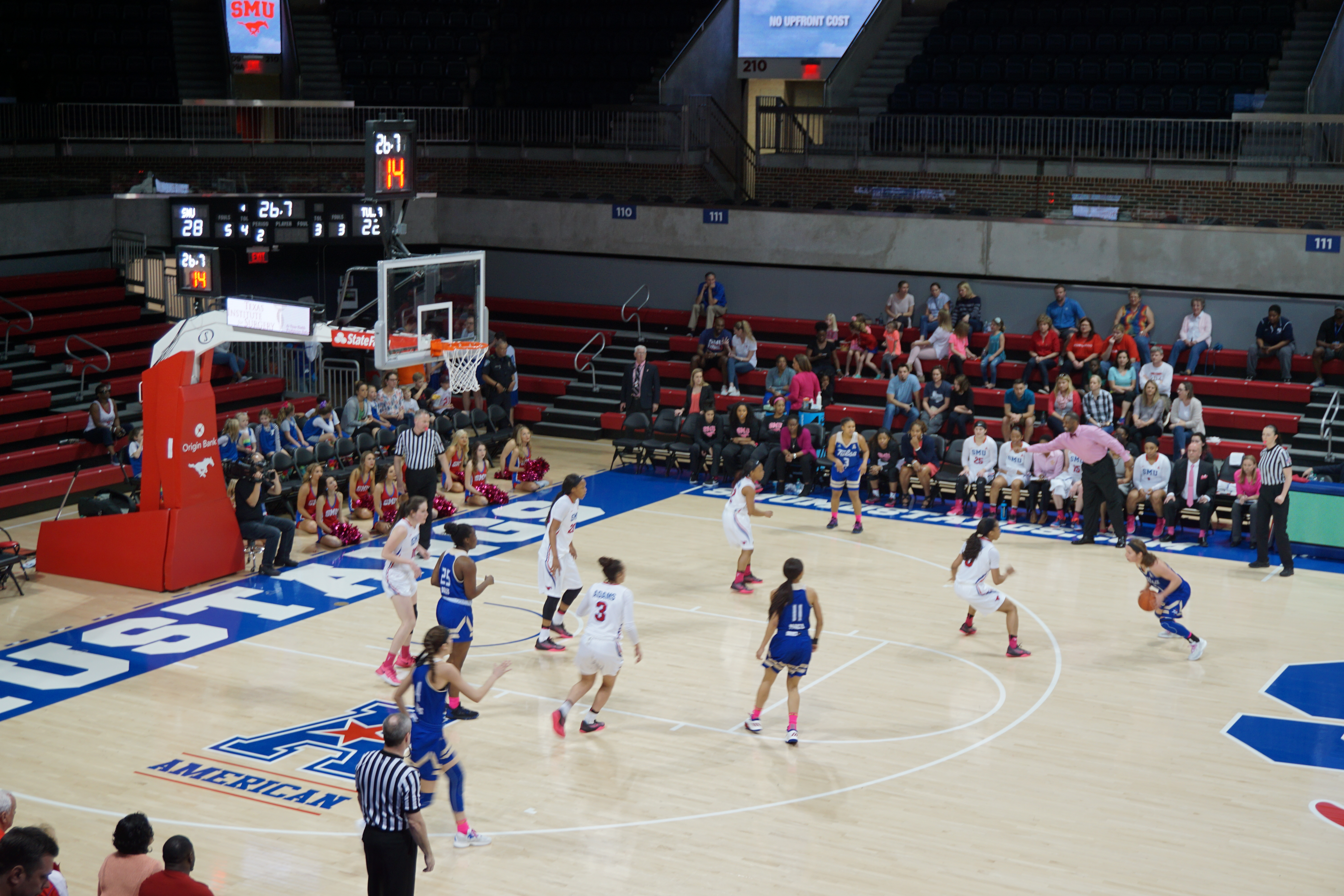
2016–17 Tulsa team playing against SMU at Moody Coliseum

The 2016–17 Tulsa Golden Hurricane women's basketball team represented the University of Tulsa during the 2016–17 NCAA Division I women's basketball season. The season marked the third season for the Golden Hurricane as members of the American Athletic Conference. The Golden Hurricane, led by sixth year head coach Matilda Mossman, played their home games at the Reynolds Center.

== Media ==
All Golden Hurricane games were broadcast on KTGX CHROME 95.3 FM and KWTU 88.7 FM HD3. The audio broadcast could also be heard on Hurricane Vision. A video stream for all home games was on Hurricane Vision, ESPN3, or AAC Digital. Road games were typically streamed on the opponents website, though conference road games could also appear on ESPN3 or AAC Digital.

== Roster ==
2016–17 Tulsa Golden Hurricane women's basketball team
Players
Coaches

| Pos. | # | Name | Height | Year | Previous school | Hometown |
|---|---|---|---|---|---|---|
| F | 00 | Kendrian Elliott | 6 ft 2 in (1.88 m) | Fr | Wichita South | Wichita, KS |
| G | 1 | Teanna Reid | 5 ft 6 in (1.68 m) | Sr | Millwood; Butler CC | Oklahoma City, OK |
| G | 2 | Tatyana Perez | 5 ft 6 in (1.68 m) | So | Cypress Woods | Cypress, TX |
| G | 3 | Erika Wakefield | 5 ft 4 in (1.63 m) | Jr | Heritage Hall | Moore, OK |
| G | 4 | Addison Richardson | 6 ft 2 in (1.88 m) | Fr | Bixby | Bixby, OK |
| G | 5 | Jasmine Butler | 6 ft 0 in (1.83 m) | Fr | Pearland | Pearland, TX |
| G | 10 | Alexis Gaulden | 5 ft 8 in (1.73 m) | Fr | Broken Arrow | Broken Arrow, OK |
| G | 11 | Ebony Parker | 5 ft 8 in (1.73 m) | Jr | Klein Forest; Blinn College | Houston, TX |
| G | 12 | Renetha Dickson | 5 ft 9 in (1.75 m) | Fr | Lutheran North | St. Louis, TX |
| G | 13 | Ashley Hughes | 5 ft 7 in (1.7 m) | Jr | Sulphur | Sulphur, OK |
| F | 22 | Jessica Pongonis | 6 ft 1 in (1.85 m) | RS Sr | Hamilton Southeastern; Saint Joseph's | Fishers, IN |
| F | 25 | Tyjae' Scales | 6 ft 1 in (1.85 m) | So | Kinkaid | Houston, TX |
| F | 33 | Crystal Polk | 6 ft 2 in (1.88 m) | So | Lawton Ike | Lawton, OK |
| F | 35 | Liesl Spoerl | 6 ft 1 in (1.85 m) | RS Jr | Cascia Hall | Tulsa, OK |

Head coach

- Matilda Mossman (Western Kentucky)

Assistant coach(es)

- Shane Coffey (Oklahoma State)
- Megan Robbins (Oklahoma State)
- Leah Foster (St. Edward's)

Legend

- (C) Team captain
- (S) Suspended
- (I) Ineligible
- (W) Walk-on
- Injured
- Current redshirt

Roster

== Schedule and results ==
| Date time, TV | Rank^{#} | Opponent^{#} | Result | Record | Site (attendance) city, state |
Exhibition
| 10/27/2016*; 7:00 pm | | Rogers State | W 86–39 | | Reynolds Center (438); Tulsa, OK |
| 11/03/2015*; 7:00 pm | | Southern Nazarene | W 89–50 | | Reynolds Center (212); Tulsa, OK |
Non-conference regular season
| 11/11/2016*; 7:00 pm | | at UMKC | W 80–70 | 1–0 | Swinney Recreation Center (395); Kansas City, MO |
| 11/14/2016*; 7:00 pm, ESPN3 | | at Kansas State | L 62–82 | 1–1 | Bramlage Coliseum (4,094); Manhattan, KS |
| 11/17/2016*; 7:00 pm | | at Oral Roberts; PSO Mayor's Cup | L 68–76 | 1–2 | Mabee Center (2,046); Tulsa, OK |
| 11/20/2016*; 1:00 pm | | South Dakota | L 68–71 | 1–3 | Reynolds Center (228); Tulsa, OK |
| 11/25/2016*; 8:00 pm | | at New Mexico; UNM Thanksgiving Tournament semifinals | W 67–64 | 2–3 | The Pit (4,894); Albuquerque, NM |
| 11/26/2016*; 1:00 pm | | vs. BYU; UNM Thanksgiving Tournament championship | L 56–71 | 2–4 | The Pit; Albuquerque, NM |
| 11/30/2016*; 7:00 pm | | Arkansas | L 50–57 | 2–5 | Reynolds Center (514); Tulsa, OK |
| 12/03/2016*; 2:00 pm | | North Texas | W 63–58 | 3–5 | Reynolds Center (211); Tulsa, OK |
| 12/06/2016*; 7:00 pm | | at Arkansas State | L 80–83 | 3–6 | Convocation Center (836); Jonesboro, AR |
| 12/11/2016*; 2:00 pm, FSOK | | at No. 19 Oklahoma | L 68–85 | 3–7 | Lloyd Noble Center (3,703); Norman, OK |
| 12/15/2016*; 7:00 pm | | Saint Louis | W 70–64 | 4–7 | Reynolds Center (207); Tulsa, OK |
| 12/18/2016*; 2:00 pm | | Little Rock | L 58–63 | 4–8 | Reynolds Center (191); Tulsa, OK |
| 12/21/2016*; 11:00 am, ESPN3 | | at Indiana State | L 68–72 | 4–9 | Hulman Center (1,367); Terre Haute, IN |
AAC regular season
| 01/01/2017; 3:30 pm, ESPNU | | at Houston | L 66–71 | 4–10 (0–1) | Hofheinz Pavilion (686); Houston, TX |
| 01/04/2017; 7:00 pm, ADN | | Memphis | W 57–52 | 5–10 (1–1) | Reynolds Center (211); Tulsa, OK |
| 01/07/2017; 6:00 pm, ESPN3 | | at No. 22 South Florida | L 68–84 | 5–11 (1–2) | USF Sun Dome (1,900); Tampa, FL |
| 01/14/2017; 2:00 pm, ADN | | Temple | L 49–58 | 5–12 (1–3) | Reynolds Center (284); Tulsa, OK |
| 01/17/2017; 7:00 pm, SNY/ESPN3 | | No. 1 Connecticut | L 58–98 | 5–13 (1–4) | Reynolds Center (1,391); Tulsa, OK |
| 01/21/2017; 1:00 pm | | at UCF | W 73–62 | 6–13 (2–4) | CFE Arena (2,237); Orlando, FL |
| 01/25/2017; 7:00 pm, ESPN3 | | at Tulane | L 65–70 | 6–14 (2–5) | Devlin Fieldhouse (1,187); New Orleans, LA |
| 01/28/2017; 7:00 pm, ESPN3 | | SMU | W 66–59 | 7–14 (3–5) | Reynolds Center (864); Tulsa, OK |
| 01/31/2017; 7:00 pm | | East Carolina | W 100–92 ^{OT} | 8–14 (4–5) | Reynolds Center (193); Tulsa, OK |
| 02/05/2017; 12:00 pm, SNY/ESPN3 | | at No. 1 Connecticut | L 50–96 | 8–15 (4–6) | Gampel Pavilion (9,347); Storrs, CT |
| 02/08/2017; 11:00 am, ADN | | at Temple | L 43–70 | 8–16 (4–7) | Liacouras Center (3,402); Philadelphia, PA |
| 02/11/2017; 1:00 pm, ADN | | UCF | L 58–62 | 8–17 (4–8) | Reynolds Center (449); Tulsa, OK |
| 02/15/2017; 7:00 pm | | Houston | L 62–65 | 8–18 (4–9) | Reynolds Center (391); Tulsa, OK |
| 02/18/2017; 2:00 pm | | at SMU | L 41–62 | 8–19 (4–10) | Moody Coliseum (1,472); Dallas, TX |
| 02/25/2017; 2:00 pm | | South Florida | L 64–90 | 8–20 (4–11) | Reynolds Center (674); Tulsa, OK |
| 02/27/2017; 6:00 pm | | at Cincinnati | W 78–61 | 9–20 (5–11) | Fifth Third Arena (624); Cincinnati, OH |
American Athletic Conference Women's Tournament
| 03/03/2017; 3:00 pm, ESPN3 | (9) | vs. (8) Memphis; First Round | W 60–55 | 10–20 | Mohegan Sun Arena (4,446); Uncasville, CT |
| 03/04/2017; 1:00 pm, ESPN3 | (9) | vs. (1) No. 1 Connecticut; Quarterfinals | L 57–105 | 10–21 | Mohegan Sun Arena (5,513); Uncasville, CT |
*Non-conference game. ^{#}Rankings from AP Poll. (#) Tournament seedings in parentheses. All times are in Central Time.

== See also ==
- 2016–17 Tulsa Golden Hurricane men's basketball team
