= 2023 Sun Belt Conference women's basketball tournament =

- Classification: Division I
- Season: 2022–23
- Teams: 14
- Site: Pensacola Bay Center; Pensacola, Florida
- Champions: James Madison (1st title)
- Winning coach: Sean O'Regan (1st title)
- MVP: Kiki Jefferson (James Madison)
- Television: ESPN+, ESPNU

2022–23 Sun Belt Conference women's basketball standings
	Conf.				Overall
Team	W		L	PCT	W		L	PCT
James Madison †	13	–	5	.722	27	–	8	.771
Texas State	13	–	5	.722	24	–	10	.706
Southern Miss	13	–	5	.722	21	–	10	.677
Georgia Southern	12	–	6	.667	21	–	10	.677
Old Dominion	12	–	6	.667	22	–	13	.629
Troy	12	–	6	.667	17	–	13	.567
Louisiana	10	–	8	.556	22	–	21	.512
Marshall	9	–	9	.500	17	–	14	.548
Coastal Carolina	9	–	9	.500	14	–	17	.452
Arkansas State	6	–	12	.333	13	–	19	.406
Appalachian State	6	–	12	.333	11	–	20	.355
Georgia State	5	–	13	.278	12	–	21	.364
Louisiana–Monroe	3	–	15	.167	7	–	23	.233
South Alabama	3	–	15	.167	7	–	23	.233
† 2023 Sun Belt tournament winner

The 2023 Sun Belt Conference women's basketball tournament was the postseason women's basketball tournament for Sun Belt Conference during the 2022–23 NCAA Division I women's basketball season. All tournament games were played at Pensacola Bay Center between February 28 – March 6. The winner, James Madison, received the Sun Belt's automatic bid to the 2023 NCAA tournament.

== Seeds ==
All 14 conference teams qualified for the tournament. The top four teams received a bye into the quarterfinals.

Seed	Team	Conference	Tiebreaker
1	James Madison	13–5	2–0 vs. Texas State/Southern Miss
2	Texas State	13–5	2–1 vs. James Madison/Southern Miss
3	Southern Miss	13–5	0–3 vs. James Madison/Texas State
4	Troy	12–6	1–2 vs. James Madison/Texas State
5	Old Dominion	12–6	0–3 vs. James Madison/Texas State
6	Georgia Southern	12–6	0–3 vs. Old Dominion/Troy
7	Louisiana	10–8	
8	Marshall	9–9	1–0 vs. Southern Miss
9	Coastal Carolina	9–9	0–1 vs. Southern Miss
10	Appalachian State	6–12	1–0 vs. Arkansas State
11	Arkansas State	6–12	0–1 vs. Appalachian State
12	Georgia State	5–13	
13	South Alabama	3–15	1–2 vs. James Madison/Texas State
14	Louisiana–Monroe	3–15	0–2 vs. James Madison/Texas State

== Schedule ==
Game	Time	Matchup	Score	Television
First round – Tuesday, February 28 – Pensacola Bay Center, Pensacola, FL
1	11:30 am	No. 12 Georgia State vs. No. 13 South Alabama	59-44	ESPN+
2	2:00 pm	No. 11 Arkansas State vs. No. 14 Louisiana-Monroe	76-65	ESPN+
Second round – Wednesday, March 1 – Pensacola Bay Center, Pensacola, FL
3	11:30 am	No. 8 Marshall vs. No. 9 Coastal Carolina	60-53	ESPN+
4	2:00 pm	No. 5 Old Dominion vs. No. 12 Georgia State	66-56	ESPN+
5	5:00 pm	No. 6 Georgia Southern vs. No. 11 Arkansas State	76-81	ESPN+
6	7:30 pm	No. 7 Louisiana vs. No. 10 Appalachian State	38-51	ESPN+
Quarterfinals – Friday, March 3 – Pensacola Bay Center, Pensacola, FL
7	11:30 am	No. 1 James Madison vs. No. 8 Marshall	62-43	ESPN+
8	2:00 pm	No. 4 Troy vs. No. 5 Old Dominion	83–86	ESPN+
9	5:00 pm	No. 3 Southern Miss vs. No. 11 Arkansas State	79–72	ESPN+
10	7:30 pm	No. 2 Texas State vs. No. 10 Appalachian State	56–47	ESPN+
Semifinals – Sunday, March 5 – Pensacola Bay Center, Pensacola, FL
11	11:30 am	No. 1 James Madison vs. No. 5 Old Dominion	70-64	ESPN+
12	2 pm	No. 2 Texas State vs. No. 3 Southern Miss	85-57	ESPN+
Championship – Monday, March 6 – Pensacola Bay Center, Pensacola, FL
13	1 pm	No. 1 James Madison vs. No. 2 Texas State	81-51	ESPNU
Game times in CT. Rankings denote tournament seed

== Bracket ==
First round Tuesday, February 28, 2023; ESPN+
12	Georgia State	59
13	South Alabama	44
11	Arkansas State	76
14	Louisiana-Monroe	65

Second round Wednesday, March 1st, 2023; ESPN+
8	Marshall	60
9	Coastal Carolina	53
5	Old Dominion	66
12	Georgia State	56
7	Louisiana	38
10	Appalachian State	51
6	Georgia Southern	76
11	Arkansas State	81

Quarterfinals; Friday, March 3rd, 2023; ESPN+
1	James Madison	62
8	Marshall	43
4	Troy	83
5	Old Dominion	86
2	Texas State	56
10	Appalachian State	47
3	Southern Miss	79
11	Arkansas State	72

Semifinals; Sunday, March 5th, 2023; ESPN+
1	James Madison	70
5	Old Dominion	64
2	Texas State	85
3	Southern Miss	57

Championship game Monday, March 6th, 2023; ESPNU
1	James Madison	81
2	Texas State	51

== See also ==
2023 Sun Belt Conference men's basketball tournament
