= 2022–23 South Alabama Jaguars women's basketball team =

Intercollegiate basketball season

2022–23 South Alabama Jaguars women's basketball
- Conference: Sun Belt Conference
- Record: 7–23 (3–15 Sun Belt)
- Head coach: Terry Fowler (9th season)
- Assistant coaches: Dan Presel; Rachel Travis; Ka'Vonne Towns
- Home arena: Mitchell Center

2022–23 Sun Belt Conference women's basketball standings
	Conf.				Overall
Team	W		L	PCT	W		L	PCT
James Madison †	13	–	5	.722	27	–	8	.771
Texas State	13	–	5	.722	24	–	10	.706
Southern Miss	13	–	5	.722	21	–	10	.677
Georgia Southern	12	–	6	.667	21	–	10	.677
Old Dominion	12	–	6	.667	22	–	13	.629
Troy	12	–	6	.667	17	–	13	.567
Louisiana	10	–	8	.556	22	–	21	.512
Marshall	9	–	9	.500	17	–	14	.548
Coastal Carolina	9	–	9	.500	14	–	17	.452
Arkansas State	6	–	12	.333	13	–	19	.406
Appalachian State	6	–	12	.333	11	–	20	.355
Georgia State	5	–	13	.278	12	–	21	.364
Louisiana–Monroe	3	–	15	.167	7	–	23	.233
South Alabama	3	–	15	.167	7	–	23	.233
† 2023 Sun Belt tournament winner

The 2022–23 South Alabama Jaguars women's basketball team represented the University of South Alabama during the 2022–23 NCAA Division I women's basketball season. The basketball team, led by ninth-year head coach Terry Fowler, played all home games at the Mitchell Center in Mobile, Alabama along with the South Alabama Jaguars men's basketball team. They were members of the Sun Belt Conference.

The Jaguars finished the 2022–23 season with a record of 7–23 overall and 3–15 in Sun Belt play. They lost to Georgia State in the first round of the Sun Belt Conference tournament. The Jaguars did not advance to postseason play.

On March 1, head coach Terry Fowler announced that he will not return next season and will be stepping down from his position.

On March 24, South Alabama hired South Florida assistant coach and recruiting coordinator Yolisha Jackson as their new head coach.

== Roster ==
2022–23 South Alabama Jaguars women's basketball team
Players
Coaches

Pos.	#	Name	Height	Year	Previous school	Hometown
G	0	Tyrielle Williams	5 ft 7 in (1.7 m)	So	Ursuline Academy	New Orleans, LA
C	1	Zena Ellis	6 ft 3 in (1.91 m)	RS Sr	Countryside HS; Buffalo	Clearwater, FL
G	2	Kelsey Thompson	5 ft 10 in (1.78 m)	Fr	Davidson HS	Mobile, AL
F	3	Naomi Smitherman	6 ft 1 in (1.85 m)	Fr	Ramsay HS	Birmingham, AL
G	4	Michiyah Simmons	5 ft 6 in (1.68 m)	Fr	Blanche Ely HS	Pompano Beach, FL
G	10	Janelle Jones	5 ft 9 in (1.75 m)	Jr	B. T. Washington HS	Pensacola, FL
G	11	Nadia Howard	5 ft 9 in (1.75 m)	So	Grayson HS	Grayson, GA
F	14	Kiana Anderson	6 ft 1 in (1.85 m)	Sr	Warren Easton Charter HS; Trinity Valley CC	New Orleans, LA
F	21	Casey Ferguson	5 ft 11 in (1.8 m)	GS	D'Iberville HS	Biloxi, MS
G	22	Rachel Leggett	5 ft 8 in (1.73 m)	Fr	Navarre HS	Navarre, FL
G	23	Tristen Washington	5 ft 6 in (1.68 m)	Sr	East Ascension HS; Pearl River CC	Gonzales, LA
G	24	Jordan Rosier	5 ft 9 in (1.75 m)	So	Florida State University HS	Tallahassee, FL
F	30	Emani Burks	6 ft 2 in (1.88 m)	RS Fr	Palm Bay Magnet HS	Melbourne, FL
F	31	Maggie Robinson	6 ft 0 in (1.83 m)	GS	Davidson HS; Old Dominion	Mobile, AL
C	33	Debbie Reese	6 ft 1 in (1.85 m)	RS Fr	Lincoln Park Academy	Fort Pierce, FL

Head coach

- Terry Fowler (Lane College)

Assistant coach(es)

- Dan Presel (Spring Hill)
- Rachel Travis (Northwest)
- Ka'Vonne Towns (Chattanooga)

Legend

- (C) Team captain
- (S) Suspended
- (I) Ineligible
- (W) Walk-on
- Injured
- Current redshirt

Roster
Last update: September 15, 2023

== Schedule and results ==
Date time, TV	Rank^{#}	Opponent^{#}	Result	Record	High points	High rebounds	High assists	Site city, state
Exhibition
October 31, 2022*; 7:00 p.m.		William Carey	W 76–31		19 – Thompson	8 – Elias	5 – Williams	Mitchell Center (584); Mobile, AL
Non-conference regular season
November 7, 2022*; 7:00 p.m.		Spring Hill	W 89–45	1–0	14 – Anderson	11 – Anderson	4 – Williams	Mitchell Center (321); Mobile, AL
November 10, 2022*; 7:00 p.m., SECN+		at Auburn	L 62–71	1–1	21 – Thompson	8 – Thompson	3 – Simmons	Neville Arena (1,955); Auburn, AL
November 14, 2022*; 7:00 p.m., ESPN+		at New Orleans	L 63–71	1–2	14 – Anderson	9 – Thompson	5 – Thompson	Lakefront Arena (647); New Orleans, LA
November 17, 2022*; 7:00 p.m., ESPN+		Tulane	L 46–79	1–3	11 – Thompson	8 – Elias	3 – Thompson	Mitchell Center (284); Mobile, AL
November 22, 2022*; 7:00 p.m., ESPN+		Southeastern Louisiana	L 40–64	1–4	15 – Thompson	9 – Howard	1 – Thompson	Mitchell Center (277); Mobile, AL
November 27, 2022*; 1:00 p.m., ESPN+		Florida A&M	W 62–52	2–4	18 – Washington	7 – Anderson	9 – Howard	Mitchell Center (266); Mobile, AL
December 4, 2022*; 1:00 p.m., ESPN+		at Mercer	L 46–64	2–5	15 – Howard	6 – Anderson	2 – Robinson	Hawkins Arena (723); Macon, GA
December 12, 2022*; 6:00 p.m., CUSA.tv		at Louisiana Tech	L 50–73	2–6	14 – Simmons	7 – Elias	2 – Thompson	Thomas Assembly Center (1,190); Ruston, LA
December 14, 2022*; 6:00 p.m., ESPN+		at Nicholls	W 74–73	3–6	19 – Thompson	8 – Elias	3 – Howard	Stopher Gymnasium (224); Thibodaux, LA
December 17, 2022*; 11:00 a.m., ESPN+		Alabama State	L 56–58	3–7	13 – Simmons	10 – Elias	3 – Elias	Mitchell Center (235); Mobile, AL
December 20, 2022*; 1:00 p.m., ESPN+		Mississippi Valley State	W 68–60	4–7	20 – Washington	7 – Anderson	3 – Thompson	Mitchell Center (174); Mobile, AL
Conference regular season
December 29, 2022; 6:00 p.m., ESPN+		Marshall	L 61–63	4–8 (0–1)	11 – Washington	9 – Anderson	3 – Washington	Mitchell Center (230); Mobile, AL
December 31, 2022; 1:00 p.m., ESPN+		Southern Miss	L 37–58	4–9 (0–2)	13 – Anderson	8 – Anderson	3 – Simmons	Mitchell Center (267); Mobile, AL
January 5, 2023; 5:30 p.m., ESPN+		at Georgia State	L 57–66	4–10 (0–3)	14 – Thompson	9 – Thompson	3 – Thompson	Georgia State Convocation Center (395); Atlanta, GA
January 7, 2023; 1:00 p.m., ESPN+		at Old Dominion	L 43–83	4–11 (0–4)	11 – Howard	6 – Howard	4 – Howard	Chartway Arena (1,766); Norfolk, VA
January 12, 2023; 6:00 p.m., ESPN+		at Louisiana	L 49–66	4–12 (0–5)	11 – Howard	4 – Howard	2 – Washington	Cajundome (392); Lafayette, LA
January 14, 2023; 1:00 p.m., ESPN+		at Coastal Carolina	L 44–69	4–13 (0–6)	11 – Ferguson	7 – Anderson	2 – Elias	HTC Center (524); Conway, SC
January 19, 2023; 7:00 p.m., ESPN+		Arkansas State	L 47–63	4–14 (0–7)	13 – Robinson	8 – Howard	2 – Washington	Mitchell Center (300); Mobile, AL
January 21, 2023; 1:00 p.m., ESPN+		Texas State	W 45–43	5–14 (1–7)	17 – Thompson	8 – Howard	2 – Thompson	Mitchell Center (268); Mobile, AL
January 26, 2023; 6:00 p.m., ESPN+		at Troy	L 62–81	5–15 (1–8)	13 – Anderson	9 – Anderson	4 – Howard	Trojan Arena (2,917); Troy, AL
January 28, 2023; 2:00 p.m., ESPN+		at Louisiana–Monroe	L 65–69	5–16 (1–9)	27 – Thompson	11 – Elias	5 – Thompson	Fant–Ewing Coliseum (812); Monroe, LA
February 2, 2023; 8:00 p.m., ESPN+		James Madison	L 54–72	5–17 (1–10)	22 – Thompson	14 – Thompson	4 – Simmons	Mitchell Center (284); Mobile, AL
February 4, 2023; 2:00 p.m., ESPN+		at Southern Miss	L 40–61	5–18 (1–11)	18 – Simmons	5 – Simmons	4 – Thompson	Reed Green Coliseum (1,449); Hattiesburg, MS
February 9, 2023; 11:00 a.m., ESPN+		Louisiana–Monroe	W 72–62	6–18 (2–11)	18 – Simmons	12 – Anderson	4 – Simmons	Mitchell Center (2,639); Mobile, AL
February 11, 2023; 2:00 p.m., ESPN+		Louisiana	L 48–58	6–19 (2–12)	11 – Thompson	5 – Anderson	3 – Thompson	Mitchell Center (288); Mobile, AL
February 16, 2023; 5:00 p.m., ESPN+		at Arkansas State	L 58–78	6–20 (2–13)	15 – Howard	10 – Howard	5 – Thompson	First National Bank Arena; Jonesboro, AR
February 18, 2023; 2:00 p.m., ESPN+		at Texas State	L 57–77	6–21 (2–14)	23 – Thompson	9 – Anderson	3 – Thompson	Strahan Arena (1,017); San Marcos, TX
February 22, 2023; 7:00 p.m., ESPN+		Georgia Southern	L 59–75	6–22 (2–15)	12 – Anderson	8 – Anderson	6 – Thompson	Mitchell Center (198); Mobile, AL
February 24, 2023; 7:00 p.m., ESPN+		Troy	W 60–59	7–22 (3–15)	22 – Thompson	9 – Anderson	3 – Howard	Mitchell Center (644); Mobile, AL
Sun Belt tournament
February 28, 2023; 11:30 a.m., ESPN+	(13)	vs. (12) Georgia State; First round	L 44–59	7–23	16 – Thompson	11 – Robinson	3 – Howard	Pensacola Bay Center; Pensacola, FL
*Non-conference game. ^{#}Rankings from AP poll. (#) Tournament seedings in parentheses. All times are in Central.

== See also ==
- 2022–23 South Alabama Jaguars men's basketball team
