= 2022–23 Louisiana Ragin' Cajuns women's basketball team =

Intercollegiate basketball season

2022–23 Louisiana Ragin' Cajuns women's basketball
- Conference: Sun Belt Conference
- Record: 16–15 (10–8 Sun Belt)
- Head coach: Garry Brodhead (11th season)
- Assistant coaches: Deacon Jones; M. C. Vogt; Adrian Sanders
- Home arena: Cajundome

2022–23 Sun Belt Conference women's basketball standings
	Conf.				Overall
Team	W		L	PCT	W		L	PCT
James Madison †	13	–	5	.722	27	–	8	.771
Texas State	13	–	5	.722	24	–	10	.706
Southern Miss	13	–	5	.722	21	–	10	.677
Georgia Southern	12	–	6	.667	21	–	10	.677
Old Dominion	12	–	6	.667	22	–	13	.629
Troy	12	–	6	.667	17	–	13	.567
Louisiana	10	–	8	.556	22	–	21	.512
Marshall	9	–	9	.500	17	–	14	.548
Coastal Carolina	9	–	9	.500	14	–	17	.452
Arkansas State	6	–	12	.333	13	–	19	.406
Appalachian State	6	–	12	.333	11	–	20	.355
Georgia State	5	–	13	.278	12	–	21	.364
Louisiana–Monroe	3	–	15	.167	7	–	23	.233
South Alabama	3	–	15	.167	7	–	23	.233
† 2023 Sun Belt tournament winner

The 2022–23 Louisiana Ragin' Cajuns women's basketball team represented the University of Louisiana at Lafayette during the 2022–23 NCAA Division I women's basketball season. The Ragin' Cajuns, led by eleventh-year head coach Garry Brodhead, played all home games at the Cajundome along with the Louisiana Ragin' Cajuns men's basketball team. They were members of the Sun Belt Conference.

== Previous season ==
The Ragin' Cajuns finished the 2021–22 season 18–7, 9–4 in Sun Belt play to finish third in the conference. They made it to the 2021-22 Sun Belt Conference women's basketball tournament where the ultimately lost to eventual tournament champions UT Arlington in the semifinals. They were not invited to any additional post-season play.

== Offseason ==
=== Departures ===
Name	Number	Pos.	Height	Year	Hometown	Notes
Indiana Bodley	1	G	5'10"	Freshman	Melbourne, Australia	Released/Quit
Makayia Hallmon	3	G	5'3"	Sophomore	Coushatta, Louisiana	Transferred to Troy
Skyler Christmas	13	G	5'5"	Freshman	Slidell, Louisiana	Transferred to Georgia Southwestern
Diamond Morrison	15	G	5'4"	Junior	Georgetown, Texas	Eligibility Expired
Lafaedria Green	33	F	6'1"	Freshman	Monroe, Louisiana	Released/Quit
Ty'Reona Doucet	35	F	6'1"	Senior	Ville Platte, Louisiana	Graduated

=== Transfers ===
Name	Number	Pos.	Height	Year	Hometown	Old School
Mariah Stewart	1	C	6'2"	Sophomore	St. Louis, Missouri	Mineral Area College
Nubia Benedith	3	G	5'8"	Sophomore	Palm Bay, Florida	North Florida
Lizzy Ratcliff	10	G	5'7"	Sophomore	Lafayette, Louisiana	McNeese State
Sherry Porter	21	G	5'6"	Senior	Baton Rouge, Louisiana	Western Kentucky
Wilnie Joseph	35	C	6'5"	Sophomore	Greenwood, Indiana	Labette CC

== Roster ==
2022–23 Louisiana Ragin' Cajuns women's basketball team
Players
Coaches

Pos.	#	Name	Height	Year	Previous school	Hometown
F	0	Ashlyn Jones	6 ft 0 in (1.83 m)	So	Klein Oak HS	Houston, Texas
C	1	Mariah Stewart	6 ft 2 in (1.88 m)	So	Hancock Place HS; Mineral Area	St. Louis, Missouri
G	2	Brandi Williams	5 ft 6 in (1.68 m)	Sr	Barbe HS	Lake Charles, Louisiana
G	3	Nubia Benedith	5 ft 8 in (1.73 m)	So	Heritage HS; North Florida	Palm Bay, Florida
G	4	Lanay Wheaton	5 ft 7 in (1.7 m)	So	Holmes HS; Old Dominion	Hope, Arkansas
F	5	Tamera Johnson	5 ft 11 in (1.8 m)	So	Lafayette Christian	Lafayette, Louisiana
G	10	Lizzy Ratcliff	5 ft 7 in (1.7 m)	So	Teurlings Catholic; McNeese State	Lafayette, Louisiana
G	11	Imani Rothschild	5 ft 7 in (1.7 m)	Fr	Warren Easton HS	New Orleans, Louisiana
F	20	Caira Wren	5 ft 10 in (1.78 m)	Jr	McKinley Senior HS	Baton Rouge, Louisiana
G	21	Sherry Porter	5 ft 6 in (1.68 m)	Sr	Madison Prep; Western Kentucky	Baton Rouge, Louisiana
G	22	Jaylyn James	5 ft 8 in (1.73 m)	RS Fr	Mandeville HS	Madisonville, Louisiana
G	23	Alicia Blanton	5 ft 9 in (1.75 m)	RS Fr	Foster HS	Richmond, Texas
G	24	Destiny Rice	5 ft 8 in (1.73 m)	Jr	North Caddo Magnet; Alabama	Shreveport, Louisiana
G	25	Imani Ivery	5 ft 9 in (1.75 m)	Fr	Foster HS	Houston, Texas
C	35	Wilnie Joseph	6 ft 5 in (1.96 m)	So	Whiteland HS; Labette CC	Greenwood, Indiana

Head coach

- Garry Brodhead (Louisiana)

Assistant coach(es)

- Deacon Jones (Louisiana)
- M. C. Vogt (Texas A&M)
- Adrian Sanders (Southern)

Legend

- (C) Team captain
- (S) Suspended
- (I) Ineligible
- (W) Walk-on
- Injured
- Current redshirt

Roster

== Schedule and results ==
Date time, TV	Rank^{#}	Opponent^{#}	Result	Record	High points	High rebounds	High assists	Site city, state
Exhibition
11/02/2022*; 6:00 p.m.		Spring Hill	W 77–33		14 – Wheaton	6 – Wren	3 – Tied	Cajundome (269); Lafayette, LA
Non-conference Regular Season
11/07/2022*; 5:00 p.m., ESPN+		Houston	W 55–48	1–0	15 – Johnson	12 – Johnson	3 – Rice	Cajundome (358); Lafayette, LA
11/11/2022*; 7:30 p.m., LHN		at No. 3 Texas	L 45–68	1–1	15 – Johnson	7 – Johnson	2 – Johnson	Moody Center (5,658); Austin, TX
11/15/2022*; 3:30 p.m., ESPN+		vs. Colorado; Preseason Women's NIT	L 43–73	1–2	9 – Rice	4 – Tied	3 – Ivery	United Supermarkets Arena; Lubbock, TX
11/16/2022*; 4:30 p.m., ESPN+		vs. Jackson State; Preseason Women's NIT	L 41–70	1–3	9 – Johnson	5 – Wheaton	2 – Tied	United Supermarkets Arena; Lubbock, TX
11/20/2022*; 4:00 p.m., ESPN+		Texas Tech; Preseason Women's NIT	L 48–64	1–4	16 – Benedith	7 – Tied	2 – Rice	Cajundome (517); Lafayette, LA
11/25/2022*; 7:30 p.m., ESPN+		at North Texas; UNT Thanksgiving Classic	W 60–59	2–4	14 – Tied	11 – Johnson	4 – Wheaton	UNT Coliseum (1,647); Denton, TX
11/27/2022*; 12:00 p.m., ESPN+		vs. Abilene Christian; UNT Thanksgiving Classic	W 54–38	3–4	17 – Johnson	11 – Johnson	3 – Tied	UNT Coliseum (1,297); Denton, TX
11/29/2022*; 11:00 a.m., ESPN+		LSU-Shreveport	W 72–40	4–4	14 – Blanton	7 – Blanton	3 – Wheaton	Cajundome (1,982); Lafayette, LA
12/03/2022*; 2:00 p.m., ESPN+		Louisiana Christian	W 62–46	5–4	17 – Johnson	9 – Johnson	2 – Tied	Cajundome (408); Lafayette, LA
12/11/2022*; 2:00 p.m., SECN+		at Auburn	L 41–81	5–5	11 – Benedith	8 – Johnson	1 – Tied	Neville Arena (2,447); Auburn, AL
12/17/2022*; 2:00 p.m., ESPN+		at Lamar	L 50–65	5–6	20 – Wheaton	7 – James	2 – Tied	Montagne Center (901); Beaumont, TX
12/19/2022*; 6:00 p.m.		LSU-Alexandria	W 81–50	6–6	25 – Wheaton	7 – James	3 – James	Cajundome (278); Lafayette, LA
Conference Regular season
12/29/2022; 6:00 p.m., ESPN+		Georgia State	W 54-41	7–6 (1–0)	16 – Wheaton	9 – Wheaton	6 – Rice	Cajundome (473); Lafayette, LA
12/31/2022; 1:00 p.m., ESPN+		Coastal Carolina	L 57–68	7–7 (1–1)	20 – Porter	6 – Wren	5 – Rice	Cajundome (596); Lafayette, LA
01/05/2023; 6:00 p.m., ESPN+		at Southern Miss	L 43–44	7–8 (1–2)	9 – Johnson	5 – Johnson	2 – Tied	Reed Green Coliseum (725); Hattiesburg, MS
01/07/2023; 2:00 p.m., ESPN+		at Texas State	W 71–51	8–8 (2–2)	21 – Rice	11 – Wren	3 – Rice	Strahan Arena (742); San Marcos, TX
01/12/2023; 6:00 p.m., ESPN+		South Alabama	W 66–49	9–8 (3–2)	18 – Wheaton	8 – Tied	3 – Tied	Cajundome (392); Lafayette, LA
01/14/2023; 4:00 p.m., ESPN+		at Troy	L 78–85 ^{OT}	9–9 (3–3)	20 – Wheaton	6 – Tied	6 – Wheaton	Trojan Arena (2,187); Troy, AL
01/19/2023; 6:00 p.m., ESPN+		Old Dominion	W 61–51	10–9 (4–3)	20 – Wheaton	7 – Wren	3 – Rice	Cajundome (429); Lafayette, LA
01/21/2023; 2:00 p.m., ESPN+		Arkansas State	W 49–48 ^{OT}	11–9 (5–3)	13 – Benedith	12 – Johnson	2 – Tied	Cajundome (404); Lafayette, LA
01/26/2023; 5:00 p.m., ESPN+		at Georgia Southern	W 68–58	12–9 (6–3)	19 – Wheaton	11 – Johnson	4 – Johnson	Hanner Fieldhouse (686); Statesboro, GA
01/28/2023; 1:00 p.m., ESPN+		at Appalachian State	W 65–51	13–9 (7–3)	22 – Johnson	8 – Johnson	3 – Rice	Holmes Center (607); Boone, NC
02/02/2023; 5:00 p.m., ESPN+		Louisiana–Monroe	W 66–58	14–9 (8–3)	15 – Blanton	9 – Johnson	3 – Blanton	Cajundome (348); Lafayette, LA
02/04/2023; 2:00 p.m., ESPN+		Troy	L 80–81 ^{OT}	14–10 (8–4)	23 – Johnson	7 – Tied	2 – Tied	Cajundome (714); Lafayette, LA
02/09/2023; 6:00 p.m., ESPN+		at James Madison	L 59–65	14–11 (8–5)	17 – Stewart	11 – Johnson	3 – Porter	Atlantic Union Bank Center (2,430); Harrisonburg, VA
02/11/2023; 2:00 p.m., ESPN+		at South Alabama	W 58–48	15–11 (9–5)	12 – Johnson	4 – Tied	3 – Wheaton	Mitchell Center (288); Mobile, AL
02/16/2023; 6:30 p.m., ESPN+		at Louisiana–Monroe	W 57–46	16–11 (10–5)	14 – Tied	10 – Wren	5 – Johnson	Fant–Ewing Coliseum (818); Monroe, LA
02/18/2023; 4:30 p.m., ESPN+		at Arkansas State	L 59–69	16–12 (10–6)	16 – Johnson	12 – Johnson	3 – Porter	First National Bank Arena (1,353); Jonesboro, AR
02/22/2023; 5:00 p.m., ESPN+		Texas State	L 51–58	16–13 (10–7)	23 – Wheaton	7 – Tied	2 – Tied	Cajundome (654); Lafayette, LA
02/24/2023; 5:00 p.m., ESPN+		Southern Miss	L 64–69 ^{OT}	16–14 (10–8)	21 – Wheaton	6 – Johnson	3 – Jones	Cajundome (793); Lafayette, LA
Sun Belt Tournament
03/01/2023; 7:30 p.m., ESPN+	(7)	vs. (10) Appalachian State; Second Round	L 38–51	16–15	12 – Wheaton	10 – Johnson	2 – Rice	Pensacola Bay Center (578); Pensacola, FL
*Non-conference game. ^{#}Rankings from AP Poll. (#) Tournament seedings in parentheses. All times are in Central Time.

== See also ==
- 2022–23 Louisiana Ragin' Cajuns men's basketball team
