= 2022–23 Texas State Bobcats women's basketball team =

Intercollegiate basketball season

2022–23 Texas State Bobcats women's basketball

Sun Belt co-regular season champions
- Conference: Sun Belt Conference
- Record: 23–10 (13–5 Sun Belt)
- Head coach: Zenarae Antoine (12th season)
- Assistant coaches: Nathan Teymer; Jericka Jenkins; Paige Love
- Home arena: Strahan Arena

2022–23 Sun Belt Conference women's basketball standings
	Conf.				Overall
Team	W		L	PCT	W		L	PCT
James Madison †	13	–	5	.722	27	–	8	.771
Texas State	13	–	5	.722	24	–	10	.706
Southern Miss	13	–	5	.722	21	–	10	.677
Georgia Southern	12	–	6	.667	21	–	10	.677
Old Dominion	12	–	6	.667	22	–	13	.629
Troy	12	–	6	.667	17	–	13	.567
Louisiana	10	–	8	.556	22	–	21	.512
Marshall	9	–	9	.500	17	–	14	.548
Coastal Carolina	9	–	9	.500	14	–	17	.452
Arkansas State	6	–	12	.333	13	–	19	.406
Appalachian State	6	–	12	.333	11	–	20	.355
Georgia State	5	–	13	.278	12	–	21	.364
Louisiana–Monroe	3	–	15	.167	7	–	23	.233
South Alabama	3	–	15	.167	7	–	23	.233
† 2023 Sun Belt tournament winner

The 2022–23 Texas State Bobcats women's basketball team represented Texas State University during the 2022–23 NCAA Division I women's basketball season. The basketball team, led by twelfth-year head coach Zenarae Antoine, played all home games at the Strahan Arena along with the Texas State Bobcats men's basketball team. They were members of the Sun Belt Conference.

== Roster ==
2022–23 Texas State Bobcats women's basketball team
Players
Coaches

Pos.	#	Name	Height	Year	Previous school	Hometown
G	3	Kennedy Taylor	5 ft 3 in (1.6 m)	GS	Lincoln HS	Dallas, Texas
G	4	Sierra Dickson	5 ft 7 in (1.7 m)	Jr	Hebron HS	Carrollton, Texas
F	5	Morgan Hill	6 ft 3 in (1.91 m)	Jr	Cypress Creek HS; Louisiana–Monroe	Houston, Texas
PG	10	Kennedy Claybrooks	5 ft 6 in (1.68 m)	Fr	Bartlett HS	Cordova, Tennessee
G	11	Sierra Brooks	5 ft 8 in (1.73 m)	So	Harker Heights HS	Killeen, Texas
G	12	Timia Jefferson	5 ft 9 in (1.75 m)	Sr	Mansfield Timberview HS; Houston Baptist	Mansfield, Texas
G	15	Ja'Kayla Bowie	5 ft 8 in (1.73 m)	GS	Robert E. Lee HS	Tyler, Texas
F	20	Chelsea Johnson	6 ft 1 in (1.85 m)	GS	Loyola College Prep	Shreveport, Louisiana
G	23	Tianna Eaton	5 ft 10 in (1.78 m)	GS	Rowland HS; UC Riverside	Walnut, California
G	24	Taelour Pruitt	5 ft 6 in (1.68 m)	GS	Crowley HS; Southeast Missouri State	Crowley, Texas
F	25	Lauryn Thompson	6 ft 1 in (1.85 m)	RS Sr	Mansfield Timberview HS; VCU	Arlington, Texas
F	32	Da'Nasia Hood	6 ft 1 in (1.85 m)	GS	Karen Wagner HS	San Antonio, Texas
F	40	Nicole Leff	6 ft 1 in (1.85 m)	Jr	Cedar Park HS	Cedar Park, Texas
C	55	Jaeda Reed	6 ft 1 in (1.85 m)	GS	Eisenhower HS	Lawton, Oklahoma

Head coach

- Zenarae Antoine (Ohio)

Assistant coach(es)

- Nathan Teymer (Georgia Southwestern State)
- Jericka Jenkins (Texas State)
- Paige Love (Texas State)

Legend

- (C) Team captain
- (S) Suspended
- (I) Ineligible
- (W) Walk-on
- Injured
- Current redshirt

Roster
Last update: 27 December 2022

== Schedule and results ==
Date time, TV	Rank^{#}	Opponent^{#}	Result	Record	High points	High rebounds	High assists	Site city, state
Non-conference Regular Season
11/07/2022*; 7:00 p.m.		Howard Payne	W 104–35	1–0	22 – Thompson	8 – Leff	12 – Taylor	Strahan Arena (815); San Marcos, TX
11/12/2022*; 6:30 p.m.		at Sam Houston State	W 75–70	2–0	21 – Taylor	6 – Taylor	6 – Taylor	Bernard Johnson Coliseum (935); Huntsville, TX
11/15/2022*; 7:00 p.m.		Arlington Baptist	W 101–32	3–0	24 – Eaton	15 – Hill	4 – Leff	Strahan Arena (672); San Marcos, TX
11/19/2022*; 7:00 p.m.		at UTEP	L 68–72 ^{OT}	3–1	30 – Hood	15 – Hood	10 – Taylor	Don Haskins Center (854); El Paso, TX
11/23/2022*; 4:00 p.m.		at Texas A&M	L 46–67	3–2	12 – Hood	5 – Tied	5 – Eaton	Reed Arena (2,883); College Station, TX
11/30/2022*; 7:00 p.m.		UTSA	W 60–55	4–2	16 – Bowie	6 – Bowie	4 – Taylor	Strahan Arena (946); San Marcos, TX
12/03/2022*; 2:00 p.m.		Loyola Marymount	W 74–62	5–2	26 – Hood	10 – Hood	7 – Taylor	Strahan Arena (657); San Marcos, TX
12/11/2022*; 3:00 p.m.		Morgan State	W 58–50	6–2	15 – Eaton	11 – Thompson	4 – Bowie	Strahan Arena (672); San Marcos, TX
12/16/2022*; 7:00 p.m.		Texas A&M–Corpus Christi	L 47–56	6–3	13 – Thompson	6 – Johnson	5 – Taylor	Strahan Arena (565); San Marcos, TX
12/20/2022*; 5:00 p.m.		Houston Christian	W 67–61	7–3	23 – Thompson	7 – Eaton	5 – Taylor	Strahan Arena (703); San Marcos, TX
12/22/2022*; 1:00 p.m.		UNT Dallas	W 58–39	8–3	12 – Leff	6 – Tied	5 – Taylor	Strahan Arena (422); San Marcos, TX
Conference Regular Season
12/29/2022; 4:00 p.m., ESPN+		at Georgia Southern	W 82–70	9–3 (1–0)	22 – Hood	8 – Tied	8 – Taylor	Hanner Fieldhouse (589); Statesboro, GA
12/31/2022; 2:00 p.m., ESPN+		at Troy	L 63–79	9–4 (1–1)	12 – Hood	12 – Hood	4 – Taylor	Trojan Arena (1,693); Troy, AL
01/05/2023; 7:00 p.m., ESPN+		Appalachian State	W 66–59	10–4 (2–1)	19 – Hood	11 – Hood	13 – Taylor	Holmes Center (477); Boone, NC
01/07/2023; 2:00 p.m., ESPN+		Louisiana	L 51–71	10–5 (2–2)	13 – Taylor	4 – Tied	6 – Bowie	Strahan Arena (742); San Marcos, TX
01/12/2023; 11:00 a.m., ESPN+		Georgia State	W 64–48	11–5 (3–2)	14 – Taylor	9 – Reed	7 – Taylor	Strahan Arena (3,175); San Marcos, TX
01/14/2023; 2:00 p.m., ESPN+		Arkansas State	W 89–55	12–5 (4–2)	21 – Taylor	8 – Hood	7 – Taylor	Strahan Arena (716); San Marcos, TX
01/19/2023; 6:30 p.m., ESPN+		at Louisiana–Monroe	W 65–57	13–5 (5–2)	13 – Taylor	8 – Eaton	6 – Taylor	Fant–Ewing Coliseum (734); Monroe, LA
01/21/2023; 1:00 p.m., ESPN+		at South Alabama	L 43–45	13–6 (5–3)	14 – Eaton	12 – Eaton	4 – Taylor	Mitchell Center (268); Mobile, AL
01/26/2023; 5:30 p.m., ESPN+		at Old Dominion	W 52–46	14–6 (6–3)	18 – Hood	9 – Hood	7 – Taylor	Chartway Arena (1,734); Norfolk, VA
01/28/2023; 4:00 p.m., ESPN+		Southern Miss	W 62–52 ^{OT}	15–6 (7–3)	17 – Hood	9 – Thompson	4 – Tied	Strahan Arena (1,053); San Marcos, TX
02/02/2023; 7:00 p.m., ESPN+		Troy	L 78–84	15–7 (7–4)	20 – Bowie	11 – Hood	9 – Taylor	Strahan Arena (1,142); San Marcos, TX
02/04/2023; 2:00 p.m., ESPN+		Louisiana–Monroe	W 74–56	16–7 (8–4)	18 – Hood	10 – Hood	4 – Tied	Strahan Arena (778); San Marcos, TX
02/09/2023; 5:00 p.m., ESPN+		at Southern Miss	W 69–52	17–7 (9–4)	17 – Hood	8 – Eaton	3 – Tied	Reed Green Coliseum (8,097); Hattiesburg, MS
02/11/2023; 12:00 p.m., ESPN+		at Marshall	W 64–60	18–7 (10–4)	17 – Hood	7 – Tied	6 – Taylor	Cam Henderson Center (922); Huntington, WV
02/16/2023; 7:00 p.m., ESPN+		James Madison	L 54–58	18–8 (10–5)	18 – Hood	9 – Hood	3 – Taylor	Strahan Arena (978); San Marcos, TX
02/18/2023; 2:00 p.m., ESPN+		South Alabama	W 77–57	19–8 (11–5)	21 – Hood	8 – Hood	11 – Taylor	Strahan Arena (1,017); San Marcos, TX
02/22/2023; 5:00 p.m., ESPN+		at Louisiana	W 58–51	20–8 (12–5)	27 – Hood	9 – Tied	5 – Taylor	Cajundome (654); Lafayette, LA
02/24/2023; 7:00 p.m., ESPN+		at Arkansas State	W 86–79	21–8 (13–5)	18 – Hood	8 – Hood	8 – Taylor	First National Bank Arena (1,007); Jonesboro, AR
Sun Belt Tournament
03/03/2023; 7:30 p.m., ESPN+	(2)	vs. (10) Appalachian State; Quarterfinals	W 56–47	22–8	20 – Hood	7 – Hood	9 – Taylor	Pensacola Bay Center (831); Pensacola, FL
03/05/2023; 2:00 p.m., ESPN+	(2)	vs. (3) Southern Miss; Semifinals	W 85–57	23–8	30 – Hood	16 – Hood	4 – Tied	Pensacola Bay Center (852); Pensacola, FL
03/06/2023; 1:00 p.m., ESPNU	(2)	vs. (1) James Madison; Championship	L 51–81	23–9	15 – Hood	4 – Tied	3 – Taylor	Pensacola Bay Center; Pensacola, FL
WNIT
03/16/2023; 6:30 p.m., ESPN3		at Stephen F. Austin; First round	L 79–89	23–10	24 – Bowie	6 – Tied	7 – Taylor	William R. Johnson Coliseum (1,487); Nacogdoches, TX
*Non-conference game. ^{#}Rankings from AP Poll. (#) Tournament seedings in parentheses. All times are in Central Time.

== See also ==
- 2022–23 Texas State Bobcats men's basketball team
