= 2022–23 Appalachian State Mountaineers women's basketball team =

Intercollegiate basketball season

2022–23 Appalachian State Mountaineers women's basketball
- Conference: Sun Belt Conference
- Record: 11–20 (6–12 Sun Belt)
- Head coach: Angel Elderkin (9th season)
- Assistant coaches: Mark Cascio; Jazz Weaver; Alex Frazier
- Home arena: Holmes Center

2022–23 Sun Belt Conference women's basketball standings
	Conf.				Overall
Team	W		L	PCT	W		L	PCT
James Madison †	13	–	5	.722	27	–	8	.771
Texas State	13	–	5	.722	24	–	10	.706
Southern Miss	13	–	5	.722	21	–	10	.677
Georgia Southern	12	–	6	.667	21	–	10	.677
Old Dominion	12	–	6	.667	22	–	13	.629
Troy	12	–	6	.667	17	–	13	.567
Louisiana	10	–	8	.556	22	–	21	.512
Marshall	9	–	9	.500	17	–	14	.548
Coastal Carolina	9	–	9	.500	14	–	17	.452
Arkansas State	6	–	12	.333	13	–	19	.406
Appalachian State	6	–	12	.333	11	–	20	.355
Georgia State	5	–	13	.278	12	–	21	.364
Louisiana–Monroe	3	–	15	.167	7	–	23	.233
South Alabama	3	–	15	.167	7	–	23	.233
† 2023 Sun Belt tournament winner

The 2022–23 Appalachian State Mountaineers women's basketball team represented Appalachian State University during the 2022–23 NCAA Division I women's basketball season. The basketball team, were led by ninth-year head coach Angel Elderkin, and played all home games at the Holmes Center along with the Appalachian State Mountaineers men's basketball team. They were members of the Sun Belt Conference.

== Roster ==
2022–23 Appalachian State Mountaineers women's basketball team
Players
Coaches

Pos.	#	Name	Height	Year	Previous school	Hometown
G	0	Alexis Black	5 ft 9 in (1.75 m)	Fr	Word of Life Christian Academy	Washington, D.C.
G	1	Mariah Frazier	6 ft 0 in (1.83 m)	Sr	Dudley HS	Whitsett, NC
F	2	A'Lea Gilbert	6 ft 0 in (1.83 m)	RS Jr	South Mecklenburg HS	Charlotte, NC
G	3	Taylor Lewis	5 ft 10 in (1.78 m)	Sr	Spring Valley HS; Middle Tennessee	Columbia, SC
G	4	Dane Bertolina	5 ft 10 in (1.78 m)	Jr	Charlotte Catholic HS	Charlotte, NC
G	5	Chaé Harris	5 ft 8 in (1.73 m)	Fr	Shiloh HS	Snellville, GA
G	10	Emily Carver	5 ft 10 in (1.78 m)	So	Enka HS	Asheville, NC
G	11	Faith Alston	5 ft 7 in (1.7 m)	Jr	Paul VI Catholic HS	Centerville, VA
G	12	Zada Porter	5 ft 9 in (1.75 m)	So	Cave Spring HS	Roanoke, VA
F	14	Nadiyah Byard	6 ft 0 in (1.83 m)	Fr	Griffin HS	Griffin, GA
G	20	Brooke Bigott	5 ft 10 in (1.78 m)	Sr	Seven Lakes HS	Katy, TX
G	21	Lauren Carter	6 ft 0 in (1.83 m)	Sr	Southwest Guilford HS; Morehead State	High Point, NC
F	22	Summer Schloss	6 ft 1 in (1.85 m)	RS So	Ashbrook HS	Gastonia, NC
G	24	Janay Sanders	5 ft 11 in (1.8 m)	RS Sr	Mallard Creek HS; La Salle	Charlotte, NC
G	33	Lexi Grant	5 ft 9 in (1.75 m)	Fr	First Baptist HS	Charleston, SC

Head coach

- Angel Elderkin (Southern Maine)

Assistant coach(es)

- Mark Cascio
- Jazz Weaver (UNC Greensboro)
- Alex Frazier (East Carolina)

Legend

- (C) Team captain
- (S) Suspended
- (I) Ineligible
- (W) Walk-on
- Injured
- Current redshirt

Roster
Last update: 24 December 2023

== Schedule and results ==
Date time, TV	Rank^{#}	Opponent^{#}	Result	Record	High points	High rebounds	High assists	Site city, state
Non-conference Regular Season
November 8, 2022*; 6:00 p.m., ESPN+		at Charlotte	L 94–98	0–1	25 – Carter	7 – Harris	2 – Frazier	Dale F. Halton Arena (1,112); Charlotte, NC
November 11, 2022*; 7:00 p.m., ESPN+		at Eastern Kentucky	L 63–95	0–2	13 – Sanders	6 – Harris	3 – Sanders	Baptist Health Arena; Richmond, KY
November 14, 2022*; 2:00 p.m., ESPN+		Lees–McRae	W 67–33	1–2	13 – Bigott	12 – Carter	5 – Frazier	Holmes Center (301); Boone, NC
November 17, 2022*; 6:30 p.m., ESPN+		Norfolk State	L 65–70	1–3	25 – Sanders	9 – Bigott	3 – Carver	Holmes Center (245); Boone, NC
November 20, 2022*; 1:00 p.m., ESPN+		at West Virginia	L 51–72	1–4	10 – Alston	7 – Gilbert	2 – Alston	WVU Coliseum (1,611); Morgantown, WV
November 27, 2022*; 2:00 p.m., ESPN+		Davidson	W 84–82	2–4	24 – Sanders	5 – Carver	6 – Alston	Holmes Center (300); Boone, NC
December 3, 2022*; 2:00 p.m., ESPN+		at Wofford	L 42–71	2–5	13 – Harris	5 – Frazier	2 – Sanders	Jerry Richardson Indoor Stadium (419); Spartanburg, SC
December 10, 2022*; 2:00 p.m., ESPN+		Johnson C. Smith	W 107–52	3–5	15 – Carver	8 – Black	5 – Porter	Holmes Center (317); Boone, NC
December 15, 2022*; 5:30 p.m., ESPN+		at North Carolina Central	L 70–72	3–6	18 – Sanders	11 – Alston	3 – Alston	McDougald–McLendon Arena (636); Durham, NC
December 17, 2022*; 12:00 p.m., BTN+		at No. 19 Michigan	L 49–77	3–7	15 – Gilbert	6 – Bigott	3 – Alston	Crisler Center (2,853); Ann Arbor, MI
December 20, 2022*; 2:00 p.m., ESPN+		Gardner–Webb	W 87–81	4–7	17 – Harris	6 – Gilbert	6 – Bigott	Holmes Center (323); Boone, NC
Conference regular season
December 29, 2022; 6:30 p.m., ESPN+		Old Dominion	W 81–55	5–7 (1–0)	17 – Black	5 – Carver	6 – Alston	Holmes Center (387); Boone, NC
December 31, 2022; 2:00 p.m., ESPN+		Marshall	L 52–59	5–8 (1–1)	16 – Sanders	10 – Carver	2 – Alston	Holmes Center (572); Boone, NC
January 5, 2023; 8:00 p.m., ESPN+		at Texas State	L 59–66	5–9 (1–2)	12 – Sanders	8 – Carver	3 – Alston	Strahan Arena (477); San Marcos, TX
January 7, 2023; 3:00 p.m., ESPN+		at Arkansas State	W 59–58	6–9 (2–2)	13 – Sanders	6 – Carver	3 – Sanders	First National Bank Arena (1,014); Jonesboro, AR
January December 2023; 7:00 p.m., ESPN+		at James Madison	L 64–73	6–10 (2–3)	22 – Carver	8 – Gilbert	4 – Alston	Atlantic Union Bank Center (1,777); Harrisonburg, VA
January 14, 2023; 2:00 p.m., ESPN+		at Georgia Southern	W 96–88	7–10 (3–3)	26 – Sanders	10 – Carver	7 – Alston	Hanner Fieldhouse (602); Statesboro, GA
January 19, 2023; 6:30 p.m., ESPN+		Southern Miss	L 68–75	7–11 (3–4)	23 – Carver	8 – Alston	5 – Alston	Holmes Center (450); Boone, NC
January 21, 2023; 2:00 p.m., ESPN+		Coastal Carolina	W 81–74	8–11 (4–4)	27 – Carver	7 – Carver	4 – Porter	Holmes Center (435); Boone, NC
January 26, 2023; 6:30 p.m., ESPN+		at Georgia State	L 56–64	8–12 (4–5)	20 – Sanders	5 – Bigott	7 – Alston	Georgia State Convocation Center (248); Atlanta, GA
January 28, 2023; 2:00 p.m., ESPN+		Louisiana	L 51–65	8–13 (4–6)	17 – Carver	6 – Gilbert	6 – Sanders	Holmes Center (607); Boone, NC
February 2, 2023; 6:00 p.m., ESPN+		at Marshall	L 64–72	8–14 (4–7)	17 – Alston	9 – Gilbert	6 – Alston	Cam Henderson Center (645); Huntington, WV
February 4, 2023; 12:00 p.m., ESPN+		at Coastal Carolina	L 67–70	8–15 (4–8)	26 – Sanders	12 – Gilbert	2 – Alston	HTC Center (588); Conway, SC
February 9, 2023; 12:00 p.m., ESPN+		at Georgia State	W 63–55	9–15 (5–8)	15 – Carver	9 – Alston	7 – Alston	Holmes Center (1,700); Boone, NC
February November 2023; 2:00 p.m., ESPN+		Georgia Southern	L 73–84	9–16 (5–9)	21 – Alston	7 – Frazier	4 – Alston	Holmes Center (503); Boone, NC
February 16, 2023; 6:30 p.m., ESPN+		at Old Dominion	L 65–71	9–17 (5–10)	14 – Harris	7 – Lewis	3 – Alston	Chartway Arena (1,733); Norfolk, VA
February 18, 2023; 5:00 p.m., ESPN3		at Troy	L 66–73	9–18 (5–11)	14 – Carver	7 – TEAM	3 – Bigott	Trojan Arena; Troy, AL
February 22, 2023; 6:30 p.m., ESPN+		James Madison	L 62–78	9–19 (5–12)	14 – Sanders	6 – Harris	5 – Alston	Holmes Center (500); Boone, NC
February 24, 2023; 6:30 p.m., ESPN+		Louisiana–Monroe	W 77–63	10–19 (6–12)	15 – Sanders	10 – Porter	4 – Alston	Holmes Center (452); Boone, NC
Sun Belt tournament
March 1, 2023; 8:30 pm, ESPN+	(10)	vs. (7) Louisiana; Second round	W 51–38	11–19	12 – Carver	8 – Alston	3 – Alston	Pensacola Bay Center (578); Pensacola, FL
March 3, 2023; 8:30 pm, ESPN+	(10)	vs. (2) Texas State; Quarterfinals	L 47–56	11–20	11 – Black	12 – TEAM	4 – Alston	Pensacola Bay Center (831); Pensacola, FL
*Non-conference game. ^{#}Rankings from AP poll. (#) Tournament seedings in parentheses. All times are in Eastern.

== See also ==
- 2022–23 Appalachian State Mountaineers men's basketball team
