= 2022–23 Coastal Carolina Chanticleers women's basketball team =

American college basketball season

2022–23 Coastal Carolina Chanticleers women's basketball
- Conference: Sun Belt Conference
- Record: 14–16 (9–9 Sun Belt)
- Head coach: Kevin Pederson (1st season)
- Assistant coaches: DeCole Shoemate Robertson; Jarred Jackson; Julia Ford
- Home arena: HTC Center

2022–23 Sun Belt Conference women's basketball standings
| | Conf. | | | | Overall |
| Team | W | | L | PCT | W | | L | PCT |
|---|---|---|---|---|---|---|---|---|
| James Madison † | 13 | – | 5 | .722 | 27 | – | 8 | .771 |
| Texas State | 13 | – | 5 | .722 | 24 | – | 10 | .706 |
| Southern Miss | 13 | – | 5 | .722 | 21 | – | 10 | .677 |
| Georgia Southern | 12 | – | 6 | .667 | 21 | – | 10 | .677 |
| Old Dominion | 12 | – | 6 | .667 | 22 | – | 13 | .629 |
| Troy | 12 | – | 6 | .667 | 17 | – | 13 | .567 |
| Louisiana | 10 | – | 8 | .556 | 22 | – | 21 | .512 |
| Marshall | 9 | – | 9 | .500 | 17 | – | 14 | .548 |
| Coastal Carolina | 9 | – | 9 | .500 | 14 | – | 17 | .452 |
| Arkansas State | 6 | – | 12 | .333 | 13 | – | 19 | .406 |
| Appalachian State | 6 | – | 12 | .333 | 11 | – | 20 | .355 |
| Georgia State | 5 | – | 13 | .278 | 12 | – | 21 | .364 |
| Louisiana–Monroe | 3 | – | 15 | .167 | 7 | – | 23 | .233 |
| South Alabama | 3 | – | 15 | .167 | 7 | – | 23 | .233 |
† 2023 Sun Belt tournament winner

The 2022–23 Coastal Carolina Chanticleers women's basketball team represented Coastal Carolina University during the 2022–23 NCAA Division I women's basketball season. The basketball team, led by first-year head coach Kevin Pederson, played all home games at the HTC Center along with the Coastal Carolina Chanticleers men's basketball team. They were members of the Sun Belt Conference.

At the conclusion of the 2021–22 season, head coach Jaida Williams was fired after compiling a 129–127 record in her nine seasons with the program.

== Roster ==
2022–23 Coastal Carolina Chanticleers women's basketball team
Players
Coaches

| Pos. | # | Name | Height | Year | Previous school | Hometown |
|---|---|---|---|---|---|---|
| G | 0 | Helena Delaruelle | 5 ft 7 in (1.7 m) | Jr | Putnam Science Academy; New Hampshire | Enghien-les-Baines, France |
| G | 1 | Brali Simmons | 5 ft 8 in (1.73 m) | Jr | St. Agnes Academy | Memphis, Tennessee |
| G | 2 | Jordyn Newsome | 5 ft 8 in (1.73 m) | So | MacArthur HS | Irving, Texas |
| G | 3 | Anaya Barney | 5 ft 10 in (1.78 m) | RS Fr | Cedar Falls HS; Northern Iowa | Cedar Falls, Iowa |
| G | 4 | Arin Freeman | 5 ft 7 in (1.7 m) | So | North Little Rock HS | Little Rock, Arkansas |
| G | 5 | Deaja Richardson | 5 ft 9 in (1.75 m) | Sr | Westridge Academy; Tennessee State | Kernersville, North Carolina |
| G | 11 | Angie Juste-Jean | 5 ft 8 in (1.73 m) | So | Winston-Salem Christian | Montreal, Canada |
| C | 20 | Miriam Recarte | 6 ft 2 in (1.88 m) | Sr | Multibasket HS; Lander | Pamplona, Spain |
| F | 21 | Aja Blount | 5 ft 11 in (1.8 m) | Sr | Northampton HS; IMG Academy | Northampton, Pennsylvania |
| G | 23 | Amaya Adams | 5 ft 10 in (1.78 m) | Sr | Notre Dame de Sion HS; East Tennessee State | Kansas City, Missouri |
| F/C | 31 | Arielle-Vadrelle Belinga | 6 ft 0 in (1.83 m) | So | Sandy Creek HS | Riverdale, Georgia |
| F | 32 | Makaila Cange | 5 ft 11 in (1.8 m) | Sr | New Manchester HS; Lander | Douglasville, Georgia |
| F | 34 | B'Aunce Carter | 5 ft 11 in (1.8 m) | Sr | Belleville East HS; St. Bonaventure | Belleville, Illinois |

Head coach

- Kevin Pederson (Clemson)

Assistant coach(es)

- DeCole Shoemate Robertson (Liberty)
- Jarred Jackson (Liberty)
- Julia Ford (Bentley)

Legend

- (C) Team captain
- (S) Suspended
- (I) Ineligible
- (W) Walk-on
- Injured
- Current redshirt

Roster
Last update: 23 December 2023

== Schedule and results ==
| Date time, TV | Rank^{#} | Opponent^{#} | Result | Record | High points | High rebounds | High assists | Site city, state |
Non-conference Regular Season
| 11/07/2022*; 6:00 p.m., SECN+ | | at Georgia | L 61–78 | 0–1 | 16 – Barney | 8 – Blount | 3 – Barney | Stegeman Coliseum; Athens, GA |
| 11/13/2022*; 1:00 p.m., SECN+ | | at Kentucky | L 53–79 | 0–2 | 14 – Juste-Jean | 8 – Blount | 2 – Tied | Memorial Coliseum (3,012); Lexington, KY |
| 11/16/2022*; 7:00 p.m., ESPN+ | | at Wofford | L 69–84 | 0–3 | 21 – Blount | 8 – Freeman | 5 – Freeman | Jerry Richardson Indoor Stadium (357); Spartanburg, SC |
| 11/23/2022*; 4:00 p.m., ESPN+ | | Coker | W 104–38 | 1–3 | 20 – Blount | 13 – Blount | 7 – Freeman | HTC Center (401); Conway, SC |
| 11/27/2022*; 4:00 p.m., ACCN | | at Wake Forest | L 61–76 | 1–4 | 20 – Blount | 8 – Blount | 2 – Tied | Lawrence Joel Veterans Memorial Coliseum (814); Winston-Salem, NC |
| 11/30/2022*; 5:00 p.m., ESPN+ | | South Carolina State | W 87–56 | 2–4 | 23 – Blount | 11 – Blount | 8 – Freeman | HTC Center (433); Conway, SC |
| 12/02/2022*; 7:00 p.m., FloSports | | at Charleston | L 81–85 | 2–5 | 24 – Blount | 15 – Blount | 7 – Freeman | TD Arena (170); Charleston, SC |
| 12/11/2022*; 2:00 p.m., ESPN+ | | Furman | W 69–54 | 3–5 | 16 – Blount | 16 – Freeman | 6 – Richardson | HTC Center (482); Conway, SC |
| 12/15/2022*; 6:00 p.m., ESPN+ | | Erskine | W 83–24 | 4–5 | 13 – Recarte | 6 – Tied | 6 – Delaruelle | HTC Center (371); Conway, SC |
| 12/18/2022*; 2:00 p.m., ESPN+ | | UNC Wilmington | W 68–53 | 5–5 | 19 – Blount | 6 – Freeman | 4 – Tied | HTC Center (392); Conway, SC |
| 12/21/2022*; 12:00 p.m., SECN+ | | at No. 1 South Carolina | L 39–102 | 5–6 | 15 – Freeman | 9 – TEAM | 2 – Tied | Colonial Life Arena (11,649); Columbia, SC |
Conference Regular Season
| 12/29/2022; 3:00 p.m., ESPN+ | | at James Madison | L 56–77 | 5–7 (0–1) | 16 – Recarte | 8 – Tied | 4 – Tied | Atlantic Union Bank Center (1,897); Harrisonburg, VA |
| 12/31/2022; 2:00 p.m., ESPN+ | | at Louisiana | W 68–57 | 6–7 (1–1) | 22 – Ricahrdson | 9 – Blount | 3 – Tied | Cajundome (596); Lafayette, LA |
| 01/05/2023; 6:00 p.m., ESPN+ | | Georgia Southern | L 75–81 | 6–8 (1–2) | 22 – Barney | 9 – Blount | 8 – Freeman | HTC Center (398); Conway, SC |
| 01/07/2023; 2:00 p.m., ESPN+ | | Louisiana–Monroe | L 71–73 | 6–9 (1–3) | 19 – Richardson | 6 – Blount | 5 – Freeman | HTC Center (578); Conway, SC |
| 01/12/2023; 6:00 p.m., ESPN+ | | Marshall | W 65–61 | 7–9 (2–3) | 18 – Blount | 10 – Barney | 5 – Freeman | HTC Center (504); Conway, SC |
| 01/14/2023; 2:00 p.m., ESPN+ | | South Alabama | W 69–44 | 8–9 (3–3) | 17 – Freeman | 6 – Tied | 7 – Freeman | HTC Center (524); Conway, SC |
| 01/19/2023; 6:30 p.m., ESPN+ | | at Georgia State | W 68–57 | 9–9 (4–3) | 19 – Blount | 5 – Tied | 5 – Richardson | Georgia State Convocation Center (465); Atlanta, GA |
| 01/21/2023; 2:00 p.m., ESPN+ | | at Appalachian State | L 74–81 | 9–10 (4–4) | 21 – Juste-Jean | 12 – Blount | 5 – Delaruelle | Holmes Convocation Center (435); Boone, NC |
| 01/26/2023; 6:00 p.m., ESPN+ | | James Madison | W 79–64 | 10–10 (5–4) | 20 – Tied | 6 – Blount | 4 – Delaruelle | HTC Center (416); Conway, SC |
| 01/28/2023; 2:00 p.m., ESPN+ | | at Old Dominion | L 64–78 | 10–11 (5–5) | 18 – Richardson | 6 – Juste-Jean | 3 – Richardson | Chartway Arena (2,587); Norfolk, VA |
| 02/02/2023; 6:00 p.m., ESPN+ | | Arkansas State | L 65–69 | 10–12 (5–6) | 17 – Blount | 10 – Tied | 6 – Delaruelle | HTC Center (501); Conway, SC |
| 02/04/2023; 12:00 p.m., ESPN+ | | Appalachian State | W 70–67 | 11–12 (6–6) | 26 – Blount | 9 – Blount | 5 – Tied | HTC Center (588); Conway, SC |
| 02/09/2023; 11:00 a.m., ESPN+ | | at Marshall | L 60–65 | 11–13 (6–7) | 18 – Blount | 12 – Blount | 3 – Tied | Cam Henderson Center (1,195); Huntington, WV |
| 02/11/2023; 1:00 p.m., ESPN+ | | at Southern Miss | L 68–80 | 11–14 (6–8) | 21 – Richardson | 8 – Delaruelle | 4 – Tied | Reed Green Coliseum; Hattiesburg, MS |
| 02/16/2023; 6:00 p.m., ESPN+ | | at Troy | W 99–97 | 12–14 (7–8) | 31 – Richardson | 7 – Tied | 9 – Freeman | Trojan Arena (2,371); Troy, AL |
| 02/18/2023; 2:00 p.m., ESPN+ | | at Georgia Southern | L 66–75 | 12–15 (7–9) | 20 – Blount | 11 – Blount | 4 – Tied | Hanner Fieldhouse (1,163); Statesboro, GA |
| 02/22/2023; 6:00 p.m., ESPN+ | | Georgia State | W 79–59 | 13–15 (8–9) | 31 – Blount | 14 – Blount | 6 – Tied | HTC Center (605); Conway, SC |
| 02/24/2023; 6:00 p.m., ESPN+ | | Old Dominion | W 76–68 | 14–15 (9–9) | 22 – Richardson | 10 – Juste-Jean | 5 – Freeman | HTC Center (487); Conway, SC |
Sun Belt Tournament
| 03/01/2023; 12:30 p.m., ESPN+ | (9) | vs. (8) Marshall; Second Round | L 53–60 | 14–16 | 16 – Freeman | 8 – Recarte | 3 – Delaruelle | Pensacola Bay Center; Pensacola, FL |
*Non-conference game. ^{#}Rankings from AP Poll. (#) Tournament seedings in parentheses. All times are in Eastern Time.

== See also ==
- 2022–23 Coastal Carolina Chanticleers men's basketball team
