= 2022–23 Georgia State Panthers women's basketball team =

Intercollegiate basketball season

2022–23 Georgia State Panthers women's basketball
- Conference: Sun Belt Conference
- Record: 12–21 (5–13 Sun Belt)
- Head coach: Gene Hill (5th season)
- Assistant coaches: Jon Bollier; Shanasa Sanders
- Home arena: Georgia State Convocation Center

2022–23 Sun Belt Conference women's basketball standings
	Conf.				Overall
Team	W		L	PCT	W		L	PCT
James Madison †	13	–	5	.722	27	–	8	.771
Texas State	13	–	5	.722	24	–	10	.706
Southern Miss	13	–	5	.722	21	–	10	.677
Georgia Southern	12	–	6	.667	21	–	10	.677
Old Dominion	12	–	6	.667	22	–	13	.629
Troy	12	–	6	.667	17	–	13	.567
Louisiana	10	–	8	.556	22	–	21	.512
Marshall	9	–	9	.500	17	–	14	.548
Coastal Carolina	9	–	9	.500	14	–	17	.452
Arkansas State	6	–	12	.333	13	–	19	.406
Appalachian State	6	–	12	.333	11	–	20	.355
Georgia State	5	–	13	.278	12	–	21	.364
Louisiana–Monroe	3	–	15	.167	7	–	23	.233
South Alabama	3	–	15	.167	7	–	23	.233
† 2023 Sun Belt tournament winner

The 2022–23 Georgia State Panthers women's basketball team represented Georgia State University during the 2022–23 NCAA Division I women's basketball season. The basketball team, led by fifth-year head coach Gene Hill, played all home games at the Georgia State Convocation Center along with the Georgia State Panthers men's basketball team. This was both programs' first year at their new arena after the closure of GSU Sports Arena. They were members of the Sun Belt Conference. The team finished the season 12–21, 5–13 in Sun Belt play, to finish in 12th place.

== Roster ==
2022–23 Georgia State Panthers women's basketball team
Players
Coaches

Pos.	#	Name	Height	Year	Previous school	Hometown
F	0	Zay Dyer	6 ft 2 in (1.88 m)	Fr	Maynard Jackson HS	Atlanta, GA
G/F	1	Jenae Dublin	6 ft 2 in (1.88 m)	Jr	Gwynn Park HS	Suitland, MD
G	2	Mikyla Tolivert	5 ft 6 in (1.68 m)	So	Palm Bay Magnet HS	Melbourne, FL
G	5	Ciara Smith	5 ft 9 in (1.75 m)	Jr	Riverwood International Charter	Atlanta, GA
G	10	Kamryn Dziak	5 ft 8 in (1.73 m)	Sr	M. L. Steele HS	Amherst, OH
F	11	Deasia Merrill	6 ft 1 in (1.85 m)	RS Jr	Villa Rica HS	Villa Rica, GA
G	12	Tehya Lyons	5 ft 7 in (1.7 m)	RS Sr	Norcross HS	Norcross, GA
G	13	Nyla Jean	5 ft 4 in (1.63 m)	So	H. B. Plant HS	Tampa, FL
F	20	Alyssa Phillip	6 ft 0 in (1.83 m)	So	Wesleyan	Norcross, GA
G	23	Mya Byrd	5 ft 8 in (1.73 m)	Jr	Turner County HS; Columbia State CC	Ashburn, GA
F	33	Christeina Bryan	6 ft 1 in (1.85 m)	Jr	Camperdown HS; Arizona Western	St. Thomas, Jamaica
F	35	Hannah Sadler	6 ft 3 in (1.91 m)	RS Sr	Parkview HS	Lilburn, GA
F	55	Alex Gitchenko	5 ft 11 in (1.8 m)	So		Ashdod, Israel

Head coach

- Gene Hill (Coker)

Assistant coach(es)

- Jon Bollier (Samford)
- Shanasa Sanders (Stetson)

Legend

- (C) Team captain
- (S) Suspended
- (I) Ineligible
- (W) Walk-on
- Injured
- Current redshirt

Roster
Last update: November 8, 2024

== Schedule and results ==
Date time, TV	Rank^{#}	Opponent^{#}	Result	Record	High points	High rebounds	High assists	Site city, state
Exhibition
October 30, 2022*; 2:00 p.m.		Emory	W 83–61		15 – Dziak	10 – Dyer	4 – Lyons	Georgia State Convocation Center (367); Atlanta, GA
Non-conference regular season
November 7, 2022*; 5:30 p.m., ESPN+		Agnes Scott	W 114–31	1–0	17 – Dyer	9 – Tolivert	8 – Lyons	Georgia State Convocation Center (669); Atlanta, GA
November 10, 2022*; 7:00 p.m., ACCNX		at Georgia Tech	L 42–60	1–1	12 – Lyons	8 – TEAM	2 – Lyons	McCamish Pavilion (1,337); Atlanta, GA
November 13, 2022*; 2:00 p.m., ACCNX		at Florida State	L 70–75	1–2	16 – Tolivert	11 – Dyer	5 – Tolivert	Donald L. Tucker Civic Center (1,591); Tallahassee, FL
November 15, 2022*; 12:00 p.m.		at Florida A&M	L 57–65	1–3	19 – Tolivert	6 – Dublin	4 – Jean	Al Lawson Center; Tallahassee, FL
December 21, 2022*; 6:30 p.m., ESPN+		Winthrop	W 68–45	2–3	14 – Jean	11 – Dyer	3 – Merrill	Georgia State Convocation Center (472); Atlanta, GA
November 23, 2022*; 4:00 p.m., ESPN+		at Cleveland State; Hampton Inn Cleveland Downtown Viking Invitational	L 53–57	2–4	16 – Merrill	13 – Dublin	4 – Tolivert	Wolstein Center (164); Cleveland, OH
November 25, 2022*; 7:00 p.m.		vs. St. Bonaventure; Hampton Inn Cleveland Downtown Viking International	W 66–51	3–4	22 – Tolivert	13 – Merrill	4 – Lyons	Wolstein Center (119); Cleveland, OH
November 26, 2022*; 1:00 p.m.		vs. Bellarmine; Hampton Inn Cleveland Downtown Viking Invitational	W 66–52	4–4	21 – Merrill	7 – Tolivert	5 – Tolivert	Wolstein Center (117); Cleveland, OH
November 30, 2022*; 6:30 p.m., ESPN+		Chattanooga	L 60–74	4–5	22 – Tolivert	8 – Merrill	3 – Byrd	Georgia State Convocation Center (497); Atlanta, GA
December 4, 2022*; 2:00 p.m., ESPN+		Clemson	L 58–85	4–6	14 – Merrill	11 – Dyer	5 – Byrd	Georgia State Convocation Center (677); Atlanta, GA
December 10, 2022*; 2:00 p.m., ESPN+		at Kennesaw State	L 63–69	4–7	22 – Merrill	12 – Merrill	3 – Tolivert	KSU Convocation Center (477); Kennesaw, GA
December 19, 2022*; 12:00 p.m., ESPN+		North Alabama	W 84–70	5–7	28 – Dyer	9 – Merrill	6 – Byrd	Georgia State Convocation Center (368); Atlanta, GA
December 20, 2022*; 12:00 p.m., ESPN+		LaGrange	W 81–35	6–7	16 – Dublin	12 – Dyer	8 – Byrd	Georgia State Convocation Center (392); Atlanta, GA
Sun Belt regular season
December 29, 2022; 7:00 p.m., ESPN+		at Louisiana	L 41–54	6–8 (0–1)	13 – Tolivert	7 – Merrill	2 – Byrd	Cajundome (473); Lafayette, LA
December 31, 2022; 12:00 p.m., ESPN+		at Louisiana–Monroe	W 59–49	7–8 (1–1)	14 – Merrill	8 – Merrill	5 – Byrd	Fant–Ewing Coliseum (946); Monroe, LA
January 5, 2023; 6:30 p.m., ESPN+		South Alabama	W 66–57	8–8 (2–1)	22 – Merrill	13 – Merrill	4 – Byrd	Georgia State Convocation Center (395); Atlanta, GA
January 7, 2023; 2:00 p.m., ESPN+		Troy	L 58–81	8–9 (2–2)	12 – Dyer	11 – Dyer	7 – Byrd	Georgia State Convocation Center (472); Atlanta, GA
January 12, 2023; 12:00 p.m., ESPN+		at Texas State	L 48–64	8–10 (2–3)	14 – Jean	5 – Phillip	4 – Byrd	Strahan Arena (3,175); San Marcos, TX
January 14, 2023; 4:00 p.m., ESPN+		at James Madison	L 57–62	8–11 (2–4)	17 – Tolivert	6 – Merrill	4 – Byrd	Atlantic Union Bank Center (2,106); Harrisonburg, VA
January 19, 2023; 6:30 p.m., ESPN+		Coastal Carolina	L 57–68	8–12 (2–5)	26 – Tolivert	7 – Dyer	3 – Tolivert	Georgia State Convocation Center (465); Atlanta, GA
January 21, 2023; 2:00 p.m., ESPN+		Old Dominion	L 70–73	8–13 (2–6)	24 – Tolivert	7 – Merrill	4 – Tolivert	Georgia State Convocation Center (545); Atlanta, GA
January 26, 2023; 6:30 p.m., ESPN+		Appalachian State	W 64–56	9–13 (3–6)	23 – Merrill	13 – Merrill	3 – Jean	Georgia State Convocation Center (484); Atlanta, GA
January 28, 2023; 2:00 p.m., ESPN+		James Madison	W 72–64	10–13 (4–6)	19 – Jean	11 – Phillip	9 – Tolivert	Georgia State Convocation Center (448); Atlanta, GA
February 2, 2023; 6:00 p.m., ESPN+		at Georgia Southern	L 49–74	10–14 (4–7)	16 – Tolivert	6 – Dyer	3 – Tolivert	Georgia State Convocation Center (886); Atlanta, GA
February 4, 2023; 1:00 p.m., ESPN+		at Marshall	L 45–50	10–15 (4–8)	18 – Tolivert	12 – Tolivert	4 – Tolivert	Cam Henderson Center (1,186); Huntington, WV
February 9, 2023; 12:00 p.m., ESPN+		at Appalachian State	L 55–63	10–16 (4–9)	16 – Tolivert	11 – Tolivert	3 – Tolivert	Holmes Center (1,700); Boone, NC
February 11, 2023; 7:00 p.m., ESPN+		at Old Dominion	L 54–60	10–17 (4–10)	19 – Tolivert	7 – Merrill	2 – Byrd	Chartway Arena (2,397); Norfolk, VA
February 16, 2023; 11:00 a.m., ESPN+		Southern Miss	L 57–71	10–18 (4–11)	18 – Jean	5 – Phillip	5 – Lyons	Georgia State Convocation Center (467); Atlanta, GA
February 18, 2023; 2:00 p.m., ESPN+		Marshall	W 55–54	11–18 (5–11)	16 – Merrill	12 – Phillip	4 – Tolivert	Georgia State Convocation Center (579); Atlanta, GA
February 22, 2023; 6:00 p.m., ESPN+		at Coastal Carolina	L 59–79	11–19 (5–12)	14 – Phillip	6 – Bryan	4 – Tolivert	HTC Center (605); Conway, SC
February 24, 2023; 6:30 p.m., ESPN+		Georgia Southern	L 61–67	11–20 (5–13)	16 – Merrill	11 – Phillip	7 – Tolivert	Georgia State Convocation Center (695); Atlanta, GA
Sun Belt tournament
February 28, 2023; 12:30 p.m., ESPN+	(12)	vs. (13) South Alabama; First round	W 59–44	12–20	19 – Tolivert	8 – Merrill	7 – Tolivert	Pensacola Bay Center; Pensacola, FL
March 1, 2023; 3:00 p.m., ESPN+	(12)	vs. (5) Old Dominion; Second round	L 56–66	12–21	22 – Merrill	14 – Tolivert	2 – Tolivert	Pensacola Bay Center; Pensacola, FL
*Non-conference game. ^{#}Rankings from AP poll. (#) Tournament seedings in parentheses. All times are in Eastern.

== See also ==
- 2022–23 Georgia State Panthers men's basketball team
