= 2022–23 Marshall Thundering Herd women's basketball team =

Intercollegiate basketball season

2022–23 Marshall Thundering Herd women's basketball
- Conference: Sun Belt Conference
- Record: 17–14 (9–9 Sun Belt)
- Head coach: Tony Kemper (6th season)
- Assistant coaches: Jenna Burdette; Rudy Evans; Sydnei McCaskill
- Home arena: Cam Henderson Center

2022–23 Sun Belt Conference women's basketball standings
	Conf.				Overall
Team	W		L	PCT	W		L	PCT
James Madison †	13	–	5	.722	27	–	8	.771
Texas State	13	–	5	.722	24	–	10	.706
Southern Miss	13	–	5	.722	21	–	10	.677
Georgia Southern	12	–	6	.667	21	–	10	.677
Old Dominion	12	–	6	.667	22	–	13	.629
Troy	12	–	6	.667	17	–	13	.567
Louisiana	10	–	8	.556	22	–	21	.512
Marshall	9	–	9	.500	17	–	14	.548
Coastal Carolina	9	–	9	.500	14	–	17	.452
Arkansas State	6	–	12	.333	13	–	19	.406
Appalachian State	6	–	12	.333	11	–	20	.355
Georgia State	5	–	13	.278	12	–	21	.364
Louisiana–Monroe	3	–	15	.167	7	–	23	.233
South Alabama	3	–	15	.167	7	–	23	.233
† 2023 Sun Belt tournament winner

The 2022–23 Marshall Thundering Herd women's basketball team represented Marshall University during the 2022–23 NCAA Division I women's basketball season. The Thundering Herd, led by sixth-year head coach Tony Kemper, played their home games at Cam Henderson Center in Huntington, West Virginia as members of the Sun Belt Conference. They finished with a record of 17–14, 9–9 in Sun Belt play to finish in a tie for eighth place. They lost to James Madison in the Sun Belt tournament quarterfinals and did not advance to postseason play.

== Previous season ==
In their 2021–22 season, the Thundering Herd finished fifth-ranked in divisional conference play with a record of 15–13 overall and 10–8 in C-USA play. They lost to Rice in the second round of the C-USA tournament and did not advance to postseason play.

In March 2022, Marshall, as well as C-USA members Old Dominion and Southern Miss, announced that they would be joining the Sun Belt Conference effective July 1, 2022 to compete as full-time members for the 2022–23 season.

== Schedule and results ==
Date time, TV	Rank^{#}	Opponent^{#}	Result	Record	Site (attendance) city, state
Non-conference regular season
November 10, 2022*; 6:00 p.m., BTN		at Purdue	L 61–73	0–1	Mackey Arena (2,058); West Lafayette, IN
November 15, 2022*; 6:00 p.m., ESPN+		West Virginia Wesleyan	W 72–39	1–1	Cam Henderson Center (798); Huntington, WV
November 21, 2022*; 7:00 p.m.		vs. UT Martin; Hostilo Hoops Community Classic	W 70–57	2–1	Enmarket Arena (99); Savannah, GA
November 22, 2022*; 4:30 p.m.		vs. Purdue Fort Wayne; Hostilo Hoops Community Classic	W 45–39	3–1	Enmarket Arena; Savannah, GA
November 23, 2022*; 7:00 p.m.		vs. Norfolk State; Hostilo Hoops Community Classic	L 43–48	3–2	Enmarket Arena (143); Savannah, GA
November 27, 2022*; 1:00 p.m., ESPN+		Duquesne	L 72–77	3–3	Cam Henderson Center (637); Huntington, WV
December 4, 2022*; 1:00 p.m., ESPN+		Davis & Elkins	W 104–43	4–3	Cam Henderson Center (966); Huntington, WV
December 9, 2022*; 6:00 p.m., ESPN+		Wright State	W 72–47	5–3	Cam Henderson Center (747); Huntington, WV
December 14, 2022*; 11:00 a.m., ESPN+		at South Florida	L 68–77	5–4	Yuengling Center (5,573); Tampa, FL
December 18, 2022*; 1:00 p.m., ESPN+		St. Bonaventure	W 61–53	6–4	Cam Henderson Center (608); Huntington, WV
December 21, 2022*; 1:00 p.m., ESPN+		Chattanooga	W 60–56	7–4	Cam Henderson Center (496); Huntington, WV
Sun Belt regular season
December 29, 2022; 7:00 p.m., ESPN+		at South Alabama	W 63–61 ^{OT}	8–4 (1–0)	Mitchell Center (230); Mobile, AL
December 31, 2022; 2:00 p.m., ESPN+		at Appalachian State	W 59–52	9–4 (2–0)	Holmes Convocation Center (572); Boone, NC
January 5, 2023; 6:00 p.m., ESPN+		James Madison	L 67–74	9–5 (2–1)	Cam Henderson Center (653); Huntington, WV
January 7, 2023; 1:00 p.m., ESPN+		Georgia Southern	L 80–83	9–6 (2–2)	Cam Henderson Center (678); Huntington, WV
January 12, 2023; 6:00 p.m., ESPN+		at Coastal Carolina	L 61–65	9–7 (2–3)	HTC Center (504); Conway, SC
January 14, 2023; 4:00 p.m., ESPN+		at Old Dominion	L 56–63	9–8 (2–4)	Chartway Arena (2,695); Norfolk, VA
January 19, 2023; 6:00 p.m., ESPN+		Troy	L 77–87	9–9 (2–5)	Cam Henderson Center (954); Huntington, WV
January 21, 2023; 1:00 p.m., ESPN+		Southern Miss	W 53–52	10–9 (3–5)	Cam Henderson Center (472); Huntington, WV
January 26, 2023; 7:30 p.m., ESPN+		at Louisiana–Monroe	W 61–59	11–9 (4–5)	Fant–Ewing Coliseum (1,420); Monroe, LA
January 28, 2023; 3:00 p.m., ESPN+		at Arkansas State	W 71–59	12–9 (5–5)	First National Bank Arena (1,117); Jonesboro, AR
February 2, 2023; 6:00 p.m., ESPN+		Appalachian State	W 72–64	13–9 (6–5)	Cam Henderson Center (645); Huntington, WV
February 4, 2023; 1:00 p.m., ESPN+		Georgia State	W 50–45	14–9 (7–5)	Cam Henderson Center (1,186); Huntington, WV
February 9, 2023; 11:00 a.m., ESPN+		Coastal Carolina	W 65–60	15–9 (8–5)	Cam Henderson Center (1,195); Huntington, WV
February 11, 2023; 1:00 p.m., ESPN+		Texas State	L 60–64	15–10 (8–6)	Cam Henderson Center (922); Huntington, WV
February 16, 2023; 6:00 p.m., ESPN+		at Georgia Southern	L 61–63	15–11 (8–7)	Hanner Fieldhouse (713); Statesboro, GA
February 18, 2023; 2:00 p.m., ESPN+		at Georgia State	L 54–55	15–12 (8–8)	GSU Convocation Center (579); Atlanta, GA
February 22, 2023; 6:00 p.m., ESPN+		Old Dominion	L 63–66	15–13 (8–9)	Cam Henderson Center (799); Huntington, WV
February 24, 2023; 5:00 p.m., ESPN+		at James Madison	W 71–58	16–13 (9–9)	Atlantic Union Bank Center (2,280); Harrisonburg, VA
Sun Belt tournament
March 1, 2023; 12:30 p.m., ESPN+	(8)	vs. (9) Coastal Carolina; Second Round	W 60–53	17–13	Pensacola Bay Center; Pensacola, FL
March 3, 2023; 12:30 p.m., ESPN+	(8)	vs. (1) James Madison; Quarterfinals	L 43–62	17–14	Pensacola Bay Center; Pensacola, FL
*Non-conference game. ^{#}Rankings from AP Poll. (#) Tournament seedings in parentheses. All times are in Eastern.

- Source: Marshall University Athletics

== See also ==
- 2022–23 Marshall Thundering Herd men's basketball team
