= 2022–23 James Madison Dukes women's basketball team =

Intercollegiate basketball season

2022–23 James Madison Dukes women's basketball

Sun Belt co-regular-season & tournament champions

NCAA tournament, first round, Ohio State (L, 66–80)
- Conference: Sun Belt Conference
- Record: 26–7 (13–5 Sun Belt)
- Head coach: Sean O'Regan (7th season)
- Assistant coaches: Neil Harrow; Lexie Barrier; Kayla Cooper-Williams
- Home arena: Atlantic Union Bank Center

2022–23 Sun Belt Conference women's basketball standings
| | Conf. | | | | Overall |
| Team | W | | L | PCT | W | | L | PCT |
|---|---|---|---|---|---|---|---|---|
| James Madison † | 13 | – | 5 | .722 | 27 | – | 8 | .771 |
| Texas State | 13 | – | 5 | .722 | 24 | – | 10 | .706 |
| Southern Miss | 13 | – | 5 | .722 | 21 | – | 10 | .677 |
| Georgia Southern | 12 | – | 6 | .667 | 21 | – | 10 | .677 |
| Old Dominion | 12 | – | 6 | .667 | 22 | – | 13 | .629 |
| Troy | 12 | – | 6 | .667 | 17 | – | 13 | .567 |
| Louisiana | 10 | – | 8 | .556 | 22 | – | 21 | .512 |
| Marshall | 9 | – | 9 | .500 | 17 | – | 14 | .548 |
| Coastal Carolina | 9 | – | 9 | .500 | 14 | – | 17 | .452 |
| Arkansas State | 6 | – | 12 | .333 | 13 | – | 19 | .406 |
| Appalachian State | 6 | – | 12 | .333 | 11 | – | 20 | .355 |
| Georgia State | 5 | – | 13 | .278 | 12 | – | 21 | .364 |
| Louisiana–Monroe | 3 | – | 15 | .167 | 7 | – | 23 | .233 |
| South Alabama | 3 | – | 15 | .167 | 7 | – | 23 | .233 |
† 2023 Sun Belt tournament winner

The 2022–23 James Madison Dukes women's basketball team represented James Madison University during the 2022–23 NCAA Division I women's basketball season. The Dukes, led by seventh-year head coach Sean O'Regan, played their home games at the Atlantic Union Bank Center in Harrisonburg, Virginia as first-year members of the Sun Belt Conference. They finished the season 27–8, 13–5 in Sun Belt play, to finish in a three-way tie for first place.

== Roster ==
2022–23 James Madison Dukes women's basketball team
Players
Coaches

| Pos. | # | Name | Height | Year | Previous school | Hometown |
|---|---|---|---|---|---|---|
| G | 0 | Peyton McDaniel | 6 ft 0 in (1.83 m) | Jr | Twin Valley HS | Birdsboro, PA |
| G | 2 | Chloe Sterling | 5 ft 7 in (1.7 m) | Fr | Marietta HS | Kennesaw, GA |
| F | 3 | Kadidia Toure | 6 ft 2 in (1.88 m) | Fr | Our Lady of Good Counsel HS | Silver Spring, MD |
| G | 4 | Amira Williams | 5 ft 11 in (1.8 m) | Jr | Winston-Salem Christian; College of Charleston | Winston-Salem, NC |
| F | 10 | Mya Koné | 6 ft 2 in (1.88 m) | Fr | Blanche Ely HS | Pompano Beach, FL |
| F | 11 | Claire Neff | 6 ft 2 in (1.88 m) | Jr | Maryvale Prep | Bel Air, MD |
| F | 14 | Annalicia Goodman | 6 ft 4 in (1.93 m) | Jr | Heritage HS | Newport News, VA |
| G | 20 | Caroline Germond | 5 ft 7 in (1.7 m) | GS | South Plains; TCU | Angers, France |
| F | 22 | Cheyenne Rowe | 6 ft 2 in (1.88 m) | Fr | Bill Crothers Secondary | Ajax, ON |
| F | 23 | Mikaya Tynes | 6 ft 1 in (1.85 m) | So | Norview HS | Norfolk, VA |
| G | 24 | Kobe King-Hawea | 6 ft 0 in (1.83 m) | Jr | Texas | Point Cook, Australia |
| G | 25 | Jamia Hazell | 5 ft 8 in (1.73 m) | Jr | Southeast Raleigh HS | Raleigh, NC |
| G | 30 | Kiki Jefferson | 6 ft 1 in (1.85 m) | Sr | Lancaster HS | Lancaster, PA |
| C | 32 | Kseniia Kozlova | 6 ft 4 in (1.93 m) | Jr | Montverde; Middle Tennessee | Moscow, Russia |
| F | 33 | Steph Ouderkirk | 6 ft 1 in (1.85 m) | Jr | Spotswood HS | Penn Laird, VA |

Head coach

- Sean O'Regan (James Madison)

Assistant coach(es)

- Neil Harrow (Valdosta State)
- Lexie Barrier (NC State)
- Kayla Cooper-Williams (James Madison)

Legend

- (C) Team captain
- (S) Suspended
- (I) Ineligible
- (W) Walk-on
- Injured
- Current redshirt

Roster
Last update: March 26, 2024

== Schedule and results ==
| Date time, TV | Rank^{#} | Opponent^{#} | Result | Record | High points | High rebounds | High assists | Site (attendance) city, state |
Non-conference regular season
| November 7, 2022*; 7:00 p.m., ESPN+ | | Maine | L 58–60 | 0–1 | 23 – Jefferson | 11 – Jefferson | 3 – Germond | Atlantic Union Bank Center (2,092); Harrisonburg, VA |
| November 9, 2022*; 6:00 p.m. | | at Millersville | W 80–39 | 1–1 | 21 – Jefferson | 7 – Jefferson | 2 – tied | Pucillo Gymnasium (500); Millersburg, PA |
| November 13, 2022*; 2:00 p.m., ESPN+ | | Queens | W 89–48 | 2–1 | 21 – Jefferson | 7 – tied | 5 – Germond | Atlantic Union Bank Center (1,816); Harrisonburg, VA |
| November 17, 2022*; 7:00 p.m., ESPN+ | | at Longwood | W 82–55 | 3–1 | 26 – Jefferson | 9 – Toure | 2 – Toure | Willett Hall (989); Farmville, VA |
| November 20, 2022*; 2:00 p.m., ESPN+ | | No. 13 North Carolina | L 65–76 | 3–2 | 30 – Jefferson | 11 – Kozlova | 5 – Jefferson | Atlantic Union Bank Center (2,255); Harrisonburg, VA |
| November 23, 2022*; 1:00 p.m., ESPN+ | | Liberty | W 67–63 | 4–2 | 20 – Jefferson | 12 – Jefferson | 3 – Jefferson | Atlantic Union Bank Center (1,892); Harrisonburg, VA |
| December 1, 2022*; 6:00 p.m., ESPN+ | | at VCU | W 62–60 | 5–2 | 17 – Jefferson | 8 – Jefferson | 6 – Jefferson | Siegel Center (471); Richmond, VA |
| December 4, 2022*; 2:00 p.m., ESPN+ | | Maryland Eastern Shore | W 70–59 | 6–2 | 22 – McDaniel | 7 – Neff | 9 – Germond | Atlantic Union Bank Center (1,824); Harrisonburg, VA |
| December 11, 2022*; 1:00 p.m., FloSports | | at William & Mary | W 75–60 | 7–2 | 17 – tied | 10 – Kozlova | 5 – tied | Kaplan Arena (411); Williamsburg, VA |
| December 17, 2022*; 4:00 p.m., FloSports | | at Hampton | W 57–52 | 8–2 | 13 – Goodman | 8 – Jefferson | 5 – Jefferson | Hampton Convocation Center; Hampton, VA |
| December 20, 2022*; 3:00 p.m., ESPN+ | | vs. Eastern Michigan; Hawk Classic | W 78–43 | 9–2 | 18 – Kozlova | 6 – tied | 6 – Germond | Hagan Arena (665); Philadelphia, PA |
| December 21, 2022*; 3:00 p.m., ESPN+ | | at Saint Joseph's | W 78–66 | 10–2 | 18 – tied | 8 – Hazell | 4 – Jefferson | Hagan Arena (347); Philadelphia, PA |
Conference regular season
| December 29, 2022; 3:00 p.m., ESPN+ | | Coastal Carolina | W 77–56 | 11–2 (1–0) | 20 – Jefferson | 10 – Jefferson | 8 – Jefferson | Atlantic Union Bank Center (1,897); Harrisonburg, VA |
| December 31, 2022; 2:00 p.m., ESPN+ | | Old Dominion | W 68–54 | 12–2 (2–0) | 24 – Kozlova | 9 – Jefferson | 5 – Jefferson | Atlantic Union Bank Center (1,929); Harrisonburg, VA |
| January 5, 2023; 6:00 p.m., ESPN+ | | at Marshall | W 74–67 | 13–2 (3–0) | 17 – Kozlova | 13 – Jefferson | 4 – Germond | Cam Henderson Center (653); Huntington, WV |
| January 7, 2023; 3:00 p.m., ESPN+ | | at Southern Miss | W 63–54 | 14–2 (4–0) | 19 – Jefferson | 8 – Jefferson | 3 – tied | Reed Green Coliseum (920); Hattiesburg, MS |
| January 12, 2023; 7:00 p.m., ESPN+ | | Appalachian State | W 73–64 | 15–2 (5–0) | 21 – Jefferson | 9 – Jefferson | 6 – Germond | Atlantic Union Bank Center (1,777); Harrisonburg, VA |
| January 14, 2023; 4:00 p.m., ESPN+ | | Georgia State | W 62–57 | 16–2 (6–0) | 18 – Jefferson | 7 – Jefferson | 6 – Jefferson | Atlantic Union Bank Center (2,106); Harrisonburg, VA |
| January 19, 2023; 7:00 p.m., ESPN+ | | Georgia Southern | L 65–69 | 16–3 (6–1) | 26 – McDaniel | 6 – Kozlova | 6 – Germond | Atlantic Union Bank Center (1,903); Harrisonburg, VA |
| January 21, 2023; 4:00 p.m., ESPN+ | | Troy | W 80–79 | 17–3 (7–1) | 28 – McDaniel | 9 – McDaniel | 10 – Germond | Atlantic Union Bank Center (3,079); Harrisonburg, VA |
| January 26, 2023; 6:00 p.m., ESPN+ | | at Coastal Carolina | L 64–79 | 17–4 (7–2) | 17 – Jefferson | 6 – tied | 4 – Hazell | HTC Center (416); Conway, SC |
| January 28, 2023; 2:00 p.m., ESPN+ | | at Georgia State | L 64–72 | 17–5 (7–3) | 28 – Jefferson | 8 – Ouderkirk | 5 – Germond | Georgia State Convocation Center (448); Atlanta, GA |
| February 2, 2023; 8:00 p.m., ESPN+ | | at South Alabama | W 72–54 | 18–5 (8–3) | 22 – Jefferson | 14 – Jefferson | 4 – tied | Mitchell Center (284); Mobile, AL |
| February 4, 2023; 2:00 p.m., ESPN+ | | at Georgia Southern | L 61–72 | 18–6 (8–4) | 17 – Jefferson | 10 – Jefferson | 3 – Germond | Hanner Fieldhouse (883); Statesboro, GA |
| February 9, 2023; 7:00 p.m., ESPN+ | | Louisiana | W 65–59 | 19–6 (9–4) | 18 – McDaniel | 11 – Jefferson | 4 – Germond | Atlantic Union Bank Center (2,430); Harrisonburg, VA |
| February 11, 2023; 4:00 p.m., ESPN+ | | Arkansas State | W 70–57 | 20–6 (10–4) | 22 – Jefferson | 9 – Ouderkirk | 4 – tied | Atlantic Union Bank Center (3,737); Harrisonburg, VA |
| February 16, 2023; 8:00 p.m., ESPN+ | | at Texas State | W 58–54 | 21–6 (11–4) | 20 – Jefferson | 14 – Kozlova | 3 – King-Hawea | Strahan Arena (978); San Marcos, TX |
| February 18, 2023; 2:00 p.m., ESPN3 | | at Old Dominion | W 73–68 ^{OT} | 22–6 (12–4) | 30 – Jefferson | 6 – Kozlova | 3 – tied | Chartway Arena (3,336); Norfolk, VA |
| February 22, 2023; 6:30 p.m., ESPN+ | | at Appalachian State | W 78–62 | 23–6 (13–4) | 18 – McDaniel | 10 – McDaniel | 3 – tied | Holmes Center (500); Boone, NC |
| February 24, 2023; 5:00 p.m., ESPN+ | | Marshall | L 58–71 | 23–7 (13–5) | 8 – McDaniel | 6 – tied | 3 – Germond | Atlantic Union Bank Center (2,280); Harrisonburg, VA |
Sun Belt Tournament
| March 3, 2023; 12:30 p.m., ESPN+ | (1) | vs. (8) Marshall; Quarterfinals | W 62–43 | 24–7 | 12 – Jefferson | 6 – McDaniel | 4 – Hazell | Pensacola Bay Center; Pensacola, FL |
| March 5, 2023; 12:30 p.m., ESPN+ | (1) | vs. (5) Old Dominion; Semifinals | W 70–64 | 25–7 | 22 – Jefferson | 8 – King-Hawea | 2 – King-Hawea | Pensacola Bay Center; Pensacola, FL |
| March 6, 2023; 2:00 p.m., ESPNU | (1) | vs. (2) Texas State; Championship | W 81–51 | 26–7 | 30 – McDaniel | 10 – Kozlova | 7 – Germond | Pensacola Bay Center; Pensacola, FL |
NCAA women's tournament
| March 18, 2023; 1:30 p.m., ESPN2 | (14 S3) | at (3 S3) No. 12 Ohio State; First round | L 66–80 | 26–8 | 17 – Jefferson | 8 – Jefferson | 2 – tied | Value City Arena; Columbus, OH |
*Non-conference game. ^{#}Rankings from AP poll. (#) Tournament seedings in parentheses. All times are in Eastern.

== See also ==
- 2022–23 James Madison Dukes men's basketball team
