= 2022–23 Arkansas State Red Wolves women's basketball team =

Intercollegiate basketball season

2022–23 Arkansas State Red Wolves women's basketball
- Conference: Sun Belt Conference
- Record: 13–19 (6–12 Sun Belt)
- Head coach: Destinee Rogers (2nd season)
- Assistant coaches: Lizzie Nessling; Ari Wideman; Connor McNelis
- Home arena: First National Bank Arena

2022–23 Sun Belt Conference women's basketball standings
	Conf.				Overall
Team	W		L	PCT	W		L	PCT
James Madison †	13	–	5	.722	27	–	8	.771
Texas State	13	–	5	.722	24	–	10	.706
Southern Miss	13	–	5	.722	21	–	10	.677
Georgia Southern	12	–	6	.667	21	–	10	.677
Old Dominion	12	–	6	.667	22	–	13	.629
Troy	12	–	6	.667	17	–	13	.567
Louisiana	10	–	8	.556	22	–	21	.512
Marshall	9	–	9	.500	17	–	14	.548
Coastal Carolina	9	–	9	.500	14	–	17	.452
Arkansas State	6	–	12	.333	13	–	19	.406
Appalachian State	6	–	12	.333	11	–	20	.355
Georgia State	5	–	13	.278	12	–	21	.364
Louisiana–Monroe	3	–	15	.167	7	–	23	.233
South Alabama	3	–	15	.167	7	–	23	.233
† 2023 Sun Belt tournament winner

The 2022–23 Arkansas State Red Wolves women's basketball team represented Arkansas State University during the 2022–23 NCAA Division I women's basketball season. The basketball team, led by second-year head coach Destinee Rogers, played all home games at the First National Bank Arena along with the Arkansas State Red Wolves men's basketball team. They were members of the Sun Belt Conference.

== Roster ==
2022–23 Arkansas State Red Wolves women's basketball team
Players
Coaches

Pos.	#	Name	Height	Year	Previous school	Hometown
G	0	Jade Upshaw	5 ft 7 in (1.7 m)	So	Kellyville HS	Sapulpa, Oklahoma
G	1	Jordan Clark	5 ft 7 in (1.7 m)	Jr	South Jones HS; Jones County JC	Ellisville, Mississippi
G/F	2	Leilani Augmon	5 ft 11 in (1.8 m)	RS So	Silver Creek HS; Salt Lake CC	San Jose, California
G	3	Tieriney Echols	5 ft 9 in (1.75 m)	So	Memphis Academy; State Fair CC	Memphis, Tennessee
G	4	Bre Beck	5 ft 8 in (1.73 m)	Sr	Young Magnet HS; Florida Atlantic	Chicago, Illinois
F	5	Linay Bodden	6 ft 2 in (1.88 m)	Fr	St. Jean Baptiste HS	Bronx, New York
G	10	Keya Patton	5 ft 7 in (1.7 m)	Sr	Cathedral HS; Wabash Valley; Auburn	Indianapolis, Indiana
G	11	Mailyn Wilkerson	5 ft 6 in (1.68 m)	So	Summer Creek HS; Trinity Valley CC	Houston, Texas
F	14	Jada Williams	6 ft 0 in (1.83 m)	RS Fr	Union City HS	Union City, Tennessee
G/F	15	Anna Griffin	6 ft 1 in (1.85 m)	So	Aurora Christian HS; Virginia	Aurora, Illinois
G	23	Izzy Higginbotham	5 ft 7 in (1.7 m)	So	Batesville HS; Missouri	Batesville, Arkansas
G	24	Lauryn Pendleton	5 ft 9 in (1.75 m)	So	Little Rock Central HS	Little Rock, Arkansas
F	30	Kiayra Ellis	6 ft 0 in (1.83 m)	So	Captain Shreve HS	Shreveport, Louisiana
F/C	42	Melodie Kapinga	6 ft 3 in (1.91 m)	Sr	MacArthur HS; UC Irvine	Arlington, Texas

Head coach

- Destinee Rogers (Arkansas State)

Assistant coach(es)

- Lizzie Nessling (Saint Mary)
- Ari Wideman (Prairie View A&M)
- Connor McNelis (Southern Miss)

Legend

- (C) Team captain
- (S) Suspended
- (I) Ineligible
- (W) Walk-on
- Injured
- Current redshirt

Roster
Last update: 22 December 2023

== Schedule and results ==
Date time, TV	Rank^{#}	Opponent^{#}	Result	Record	High points	High rebounds	High assists	Site city, state
Non-conference Regular Season
11/10/2022*; 11:30 a.m., CUSA.tv		at Louisiana Tech	L 56–59	0–1	13 – Higginbotham	12 – Kapinga	4 – Higginbotham	Thomas Assembly Center (2,948); Ruston, LA
11/14/2022*; 6:00 p.m., ESPN+		at UT Martin	L 54–73	0–2	14 – Wilkerson	13 – Griffin	5 – Higginbotham	Skyhawk Arena (1,309); Martin, TN
11/16/2022*; 7:00 p.m., ESPN+		Hendrix	W 95–50	1–2	19 – Higginbotham	13 – Griffin	6 – Patton	First National Bank Arena (1,235); Jonesboro, AR
11/19/2022*; 2:00 p.m., ESPN+		Utah State	W 63–57	2–2	15 – Patton	15 – Griffin	5 – Higginbotham	First National Bank Arena (1,146); Jonesboro, AR
11/22/2022*; 7:30 p.m., ESPN+		Oklahoma	L 70–95	2–3	15 – Higginbotham	9 – Griffin	4 – Patton	First National Bank Arena (3,686); Jonesboro, AR
11/26/2022*; 11:00 a.m.		Kansas City	W 79–68 ^{OT}	3–3	26 – Higginbotham	11 – Pendleton	6 – Patton	First National Bank Arena (894); Jonesboro, AR
11/29/2022*; 7:00 p.m., ESPN+		at McNeese	W 102–83	4–3	20 – Patton	9 – Griffin	9 – Higginbotham	The Legacy Center (1,311); Lake Charles, LA
12/08/2022*; 6:00 p.m., ESPN+		vs. North Alabama	L 68–82	4–4	14 – Augmon	13 – Griffin	3 – Higginbotham	Flowers Hall (377); Florence, AL
12/11/2022*; 3:00 p.m., SECN		at No. 21 Arkansas	L 63–77	4–5	19 – Higginbotham	8 – Kapinga	3 – Wilkerson	Bud Walton Arena (3,826); Fayetteville, AR
12/15/2022*; 7:00 p.m., ESPN+		Grambling State	W 79–66	5–5	19 – Higginbotham	9 – Kapinga	5 – Higginbotham	First National Bank Arena (1,358); Jonesboro, AR
12/18/2022*; 1:00 p.m., ESPN+		at Little Rock	L 44–60	5–6	13 – Higginbotham	10 – Augmon	3 – Higginbotham	Jack Stephens Center (1,831); Little Rock, AR
Conference Regular Season
12/29/2022; 6:30 p.m., ESPN+		at Louisiana–Monroe	L 66–81	5–7 (0–1)	22 – Pendleton	11 – Pendleton	3 – Patton	Fant–Ewing Coliseum (826); Monroe, LA
12/31/2022; 1:00 p.m., ESPN+		at Georgia Southern	L 86–99	5–8 (0–2)	24 – Pendleton	7 – Ellis	3 – Pendleton	Hanner Fieldhouse (453); Statesboro, GA
01/05/2023; 7:00 p.m., ESPN+		Troy	L 67–83	5–9 (0–3)	22 – Griffin	10 – Griffin	4 – Patton	First National Bank Arena (1,032); Jonesboro, AR
01/07/2023; 2:00 p.m., ESPN+		Appalachian State	L 58–59	5–10 (0–4)	16 – Higginbotham	8 – Kapinga	3 – Patton	First National Bank Arena (1,014); Jonesboro, AR
01/12/2023; 6:00 p.m., ESPN+		at Southern Miss	L 36–61	5–11 (0–5)	8 – Wilkerson	10 – Kapinga	2 – Higginbotham	Reed Green Coliseum (850); Hattiesburg, MS
01/14/2023; 2:00 p.m., ESPN+		at Texas State	L 55–89	5–12 (0–6)	13 – Patton	8 – Kapinga	2 – Augmon	Strahan Arena (716); San Marcos, TX
01/19/2023; 7:00 p.m., ESPN+		at South Alabama	W 63–47	6–12 (1–6)	23 – Pendleton	12 – Ellis	4 – Wilkerson	Mitchell Center (300); Mobile, AL
01/21/2023; 2:00 p.m., ESPN+		at Louisiana	L 48–49 ^{OT}	6–13 (1–7)	12 – Higginbotham	10 – Augmon	3 – Augmon	Cajundome (404); Lafayette, LA
01/26/2023; 7:00 p.m., ESPN+		Southern Miss	L 59–68	6–14 (1–8)	14 – Augmon	8 – Kapinga	6 – Higginbotham	First National Bank Arena (1,014); Jonesboro, AR
01/28/2023; 2:00 p.m., ESPN+		Marshall	L 59–71	6–15 (1–9)	18 – Higginbotham	12 – Kapinga	4 – Patton	First National Bank Arena (1,117); Jonesboro, AR
02/02/2023; 5:00 p.m., ESPN+		at Coastal Carolina	W 69–65	7–15 (2–9)	24 – Higginbotham	9 – Pendleton	4 – Pendleton	HTC Center (501); Conway, SC
02/04/2023; 4:30 p.m., ESPN+		Old Dominion	L 75–87	7–16 (2–10)	19 – Higginbotham	7 – Griffin	3 – Pendleton	First National Bank Arena (1,402); Jonesboro, AR
02/09/2023; 5:15 p.m., ESPN+		at Troy	W 98–92	8–16 (3–10)	21 – Wilkerson	7 – Griffin	6 – Higginbotham	Trojan Arena (3,213); Troy, AL
02/11/2023; 3:00 p.m., ESPN+		at James Madison	L 57–70	8–17 (3–11)	24 – Griffin	10 – Griffin	7 – Higginbotham	Atlantic Union Bank Center (3,737); Harrisonburg, VA
02/16/2023; 5:00 p.m., ESPN+		South Alabama	W 78–58	9–17 (4–11)	24 – Higginbotham	10 – Ellis	5 – Patton	First National Bank Arena; Jonesboro, AR
02/18/2023; 4:30 p.m., ESPN+		Louisiana	W 69–59	10–17 (5–11)	25 – Higginbotham	12 – Griffin	3 – Griffin	First National Bank Arena (1,353); Jonesboro, AR
02/22/2023; 7:00 p.m., ESPN+		Louisiana–Monroe	W 98–73	11–17 (6–11)	19 – Higginbotham	10 – Griffin	5 – Augmon	First National Bank Arena (1,024); Jonesboro, AR
02/24/2023; 7:00 p.m., ESPN+		Texas State	L 79–86	11–18 (6–12)	25 – Higginbotham	10 – Kapinga	2 – Patton	First National Bank Arena (1,007); Jonesboro, AR
Sun Belt Tournament
02/28/2023; 2:00 p.m., ESPN+	(11)	vs. (14) Louisiana–Monroe; First Round	W 76–65	12–18	19 – Higginbotham	6 – Higginbotham	4 – Higginbotham	Pensacola Bay Center; Pensacola, FL
03/01/2023; 5:00 p.m., ESPN+	(11)	vs. (6) Georgia Southern; Second Round	W 81–76 ^{OT}	13–18	28 – Higginbotham	7 – Pendleton	4 – Wilkerson	Pensacola Bay Center; Pensacola, FL
03/03/2023; 5:00 p.m., ESPN+	(11)	vs. (3) Southern Miss; Quarterfinals	L 72–79	13–19	17 – Griffin	8 – TEAM	3 – Pendleton	Pensacola Bay Center; Pensacola, FL
*Non-conference game. ^{#}Rankings from AP Poll. (#) Tournament seedings in parentheses. All times are in Central Time.

== See also ==
- 2022–23 Arkansas State Red Wolves men's basketball team
