= 2022–23 Louisiana–Monroe Warhawks women's basketball team =

Intercollegiate basketball season

2022–23 Louisiana–Monroe Warhawks women's basketball
- Conference: Sun Belt Conference
- Record: 7–23 (3–15 Sun Belt)
- Head coach: Brooks Donald-Williams (3rd season)
- Assistant coaches: Jessica Barber; Jayln Johnson
- Home arena: Fant–Ewing Coliseum

2022–23 Sun Belt Conference women's basketball standings
	Conf.				Overall
Team	W		L	PCT	W		L	PCT
James Madison †	13	–	5	.722	27	–	8	.771
Texas State	13	–	5	.722	24	–	10	.706
Southern Miss	13	–	5	.722	21	–	10	.677
Georgia Southern	12	–	6	.667	21	–	10	.677
Old Dominion	12	–	6	.667	22	–	13	.629
Troy	12	–	6	.667	17	–	13	.567
Louisiana	10	–	8	.556	22	–	21	.512
Marshall	9	–	9	.500	17	–	14	.548
Coastal Carolina	9	–	9	.500	14	–	17	.452
Arkansas State	6	–	12	.333	13	–	19	.406
Appalachian State	6	–	12	.333	11	–	20	.355
Georgia State	5	–	13	.278	12	–	21	.364
Louisiana–Monroe	3	–	15	.167	7	–	23	.233
South Alabama	3	–	15	.167	7	–	23	.233
† 2023 Sun Belt tournament winner As of November 6, 2024; Rankings from AP poll

The 2022–23 Louisiana–Monroe Warhawks women's basketball team represented the University of Louisiana at Monroe during the 2022–23 NCAA Division I women's basketball season. The basketball team, led by third-year head coach Brooks Donald-Williams, played all home games at the Fant–Ewing Coliseum along with the Louisiana–Monroe Warhawks men's basketball team. They were members of the Sun Belt Conference. The Warhawks finished the season 7–23, 3–15 in Sun Belt play, to tie with South Alabama for 13th (and last) place.

== Roster ==
2022–23 Louisiana–Monroe Warhawks women's basketball team
Players
Coaches

Pos.	#	Name	Height	Year	Previous school	Hometown
PG	0	Olivia Knight	5 ft 3 in (1.6 m)	So	Pearl HS; North Alabama; Jones County JC	Pearl, MS
G	1	Bre Sutton	5 ft 9 in (1.75 m)	So	Warren Easton Charter HS	New Orleans, LA
G	2	Gara Beth Self	5 ft 8 in (1.73 m)	Jr	Ingomar HS	New Albany, MS
G	3	Amani Brown	5 ft 5 in (1.65 m)	Jr	Terre Haute South Vigo HS; Vincennes; Western Nebraska CC	Terre Haute, IN
G	10	Aasia Sam	5 ft 11 in (1.8 m)	So	LaGrange HS	Lake Charles, LA
G	11	Jada Anderson	5 ft 5 in (1.65 m)	RS Fr	Benton HS	Benton, LA
G	12	Sarah Adams	5 ft 7 in (1.7 m)	Fr	Cedar Creek HS	Ruston, LA
F	13	Rhi Ockwell	6 ft 1 in (1.85 m)	So	Box Hill Senior Secondary; Louisiana Tech	Kilsyth, Australia
G/F	14	Myca Trail	5 ft 10 in (1.78 m)	Fr	St. Louis Catholic HS	Lake Charles, LA
G/F	15	Amaya Ford	5 ft 11 in (1.8 m)	So	Starkville HS	Starkville, MS
F	21	Katlyn Manuel	6 ft 1 in (1.85 m)	So	Northwest HS	Lawtell, LA
G	22	Qua Chambers	5 ft 8 in (1.73 m)	So	Benton HS	Plain Dealing, LA
C	24	Diamond Brooks	6 ft 2 in (1.88 m)	Sr	Jewel M. Sumner HS	Kentwood, LA
G/F	25	Kierra Brimzy	5 ft 9 in (1.75 m)	RS Sr	Natchitoches Central HS; Tyler JC	Natchitoches, LA
C	44	Sha'Miya Butler	6 ft 2 in (1.88 m)	Fr	West Monroe HS	West Monroe, LA
C	54	Emma Merriweather	6 ft 5 in (1.96 m)	Sr	Lakeside HS; Long Beach State; Texas Tech; Kansas	Buena Park, CA

Head coach

- Brooks Donald-Williams (Mississippi State)

Assistant coach(es)

- Jessica Barber (Mobile)
- Jayln Johnson (McNeese State)

Legend

- (C) Team captain
- (S) Suspended
- (I) Ineligible
- (W) Walk-on
- Injured
- Current redshirt

Roster
Last update: 8 April 2024

== Schedule and results ==
Date time, TV	Rank^{#}	Opponent^{#}	Result	Record	High points	High rebounds	High assists	Site city, state
Exhibition
11/01/2022*; 6:30 p.m.		Millsaps	W 83–47		16 – Knight	8 – Butler	6 – Brown	Fant–Ewing Coliseum (411); Monroe, LA
Non-conference Regular Season
11/07/2022*; 6:30 p.m., ESPN+		Louisiana Christian	W 88–58	1–0	18 – Brimzy	16 – Manuel	5 – Knight	Fant–Ewing Coliseum (629); Monroe, LA
11/13/2022*; 2:00 p.m., ESPN+		Louisiana Tech	L 53–68	1–1	13 – Manuel	9 – Manuel	3 – Sutton	Fant–Ewing Coliseum (1,213); Monroe, LA
11/15/2022*; 11:30 a.m., ESPN+		Centenary	W 103–28	2–1	11 – Adams	11 – Merriweather	6 – Chambers	Fant–Ewing Coliseum (5,015); Monroe, LA
11/19/2022*; 12:00 p.m., ESPN+		Central Arkansas	L 53–60	2–2	13 – Merriweather	10 – Merriweather	3 – Knight	Fant–Ewing Coliseum (473); Monroe, LA
11/22/2022*; 5:00 p.m., ESPN+		at UCF	L 54–78	2–3	11 – Brimzy	10 – TEAM	1 – Aasia	Addition Financial Arena (579); Orlando, FL
11/29/2022*; 5:00 p.m., SECN+		vs. Mississippi State	L 39–94	2–4	14 – Manuel	9 – Merriweather	3 – Ford	Humphrey Coliseum (0); Starkville, MS
12/03/2022*; 12:00 p.m., ESPN+		Champion Christian	W 85–54	3–4	30 – Merriweather	15 – Merriweather	7 – Chambers	Fant–Ewing Coliseum (887); Monroe, LA
12/10/2022*; 1:00 p.m., ESPN+		vs. Northwestern State	L 52–79	3–5	14 – Brimzy	5 – Sutton	3 – Aasia	Prather Coliseum (865); Natchitoches, LA
12/14/2022*; 7:00 p.m., ESPN+		at McNeese State	L 66–76	3–6	16 – Manuel	10 – Merriweather	6 – Aasia	The Legacy Center (1,747); Lake Charles, LA
12/17/2022*; 4:30 p.m., ESPN+		Tennessee Tech	L 59–83	3–7	14 – Sutton	7 – Sutton	4 – Knight	Fant–Ewing Coliseum (978); Monroe, LA
12/19/2022*; 12:00 p.m., ESPN+		Alcorn State	W 69–65	4–7	16 – Trail	9 – Manuel	4 – Knight	Fant–Ewing Coliseum (533); Monroe, LA
Conference regular season
12/29/2022; 6:30 p.m., ESPN+		Arkansas State	W 81–66	5–7 (1–0)	17 – Knight	9 – Sutton	8 – Sutton	Fant–Ewing Coliseum (826); Monroe, LA
12/31/2022; 11:00 a.m., ESPN+		Georgia State	L 49–59	5–8 (1–1)	14 – Trail	7 – Sutton	2 – Trail	Fant–Ewing Coliseum (946); Monroe, LA
01/05/2023; 5:30 p.m., ESPN+		at Old Dominion	L 49–63	5–9 (1–2)	16 – Merriweather	14 – Merriweather	5 – Knight	Chartway Arena (1,690); Norfolk, VA
01/07/2023; 1:00 p.m., ESPN+		at Coastal Carolina	W 73–71	6–9 (2–2)	18 – Brimzy	13 – Sutton	4 – Sutton	HTC Center (578); Conway, SC
01/12/2023; 6:00 p.m., ESPN+		at Troy	L 74–92	6–10 (2–3)	17 – Ford	15 – Merriweather	5 – Knight	Trojan Arena (2,254); Troy, AL
01/14/2023; 2:00 p.m., ESPN+		at Southern Miss	L 57–77	6–11 (2–4)	16 – Merriweather	7 – Merriweather	4 – Knight	Reed Green Coliseum (896); Hattiesburg, MS
01/19/2023; 6:30 p.m., ESPN+		Texas State	L 57–65	6–12 (2–5)	15 – Manuel	11 – Merriweather	5 – Sutton	Fant–Ewing Coliseum (734); Monroe, LA
01/21/2023; 2:00 p.m., ESPN+		Georgia Southern	L 72–86	6–13 (2–6)	13 – Merriweather	19 – Merriweather	7 – Sutton	Fant–Ewing Coliseum (1,491); Monroe, LA
01/26/2023; 6:30 p.m., ESPN+		Marshall	L 59–61	6–14 (2–7)	16 – Manuel	15 – Merriweather	8 – Sutton	Fant–Ewing Coliseum (1,420); Monroe, LA
01/28/2023; 2:00 p.m., ESPN+		South Alabama	W 69–65	7–14 (3–7)	15 – Sutton	15 – Merriweather	7 – Sutton	Fant–Ewing Coliseum (812); Monroe, LA
02/02/2023; 5:00 p.m., ESPN+		at Louisiana	L 58–66	7–15 (3–8)	12 – Sutton	11 – Merriweather	2 – Sutton	Cajundome (348); Lafayette, LA
02/04/2023; 2:00 p.m., ESPN+		at Texas State	L 56–74	7–16 (3–9)	14 – Manuel	14 – Merriweather	3 – Sutton	Strahan Arena (778); San Marcos, TX
02/09/2023; 11:00 a.m., ESPN+		at South Alabama	L 62–72	7–17 (3–10)	15 – Sutton	9 – Sutton	3 – Sutton	Mitchell Center (2,639); Mobile, AL
02/11/2023; 2:00 p.m., ESPN+		Troy	L 82–108	7–18 (3–11)	17 – Merriweather	20 – Merriweather	9 – Sutton	Fant–Ewing Coliseum; Monroe, LA
02/16/2023; 6:30 p.m., ESPN+		Louisiana	L 46–57	7–19 (3–12)	16 – Trail	23 – Merriweather	5 – Sutton	Fant–Ewing Coliseum; Monroe, LA
02/18/2023; 2:00 p.m., ESPN3		Southern Miss	L 82–84 ^{OT}	7–20 (3–13)	14 – Sutton	12 – Merriweather	7 – Sutton	Fant–Ewing Coliseum; Monroe, LA
02/22/2023; 7:00 p.m., ESPN+		at Arkansas State	L 73–98	7–21 (3–14)	19 – Sutton	6 – Ford	4 – Sutton	First National Bank Arena; Jonesboro, AR
02/24/2023; 5:30 p.m., ESPN+		at Appalachian State	L 63–77	7–22 (3–15)	24 – Merriweather	15 – Ford	6 – Sutton	Holmes Center; Boone, NC
Sun Belt tournament
02/28/2023; 2:00 p.m., ESPN+	(14)	vs. (11) Arkansas State; First round	L 65–76	7–23	16 – Aasia	11 – Aasia	4 – Sutton	Pensacola Bay Center; Pensacola, FL
*Non-conference game. ^{#}Rankings from AP poll. (#) Tournament seedings in parentheses. All times are in Central Time.

== See also ==
- 2022–23 Louisiana–Monroe Warhawks men's basketball team
