= 2022–23 Georgia Southern Eagles women's basketball team =

Intercollegiate basketball season

2022–23 Georgia Southern Eagles women's basketball

WBI, fourth place
- Conference: Sun Belt Conference
- Record: 21–10 (12–6 Sun Belt)
- Head coach: Anita Howard (4th season)
- Assistant coaches: Deont'a McChester; Elaine Powell; Chris Godfrey
- Home arena: Hanner Fieldhouse

2022–23 Sun Belt Conference women's basketball standings
	Conf.				Overall
Team	W		L	PCT	W		L	PCT
James Madison †	13	–	5	.722	27	–	8	.771
Texas State	13	–	5	.722	24	–	10	.706
Southern Miss	13	–	5	.722	21	–	10	.677
Georgia Southern	12	–	6	.667	21	–	10	.677
Old Dominion	12	–	6	.667	22	–	13	.629
Troy	12	–	6	.667	17	–	13	.567
Louisiana	10	–	8	.556	22	–	21	.512
Marshall	9	–	9	.500	17	–	14	.548
Coastal Carolina	9	–	9	.500	14	–	17	.452
Arkansas State	6	–	12	.333	13	–	19	.406
Appalachian State	6	–	12	.333	11	–	20	.355
Georgia State	5	–	13	.278	12	–	21	.364
Louisiana–Monroe	3	–	15	.167	7	–	23	.233
South Alabama	3	–	15	.167	7	–	23	.233
† 2023 Sun Belt tournament winner

The 2022–23 Georgia Southern Eagles women's basketball team represented Georgia Southern University during the 2022–23 NCAA Division I women's basketball season. The team, led by fourth-year head coach Anita Howard, played all home games at the Hanner Fieldhouse in Statesboro, Georgia along with the Georgia Southern Eagles men's basketball team. They were members of the Sun Belt Conference. They finished the season 21–10, 12–6 in Sun Belt play, to finish in a three-way tie for fourth place.

== Roster ==
2022–23 Georgia Southern Eagles women's basketball team
Players
Coaches

Pos.	#	Name	Height	Year	Previous school	Hometown
G	1	Andreana Wrister	5 ft 8 in (1.73 m)	Sr	Cordova HS; Providence	Memphis, TN
G	2	Paris Miller	5 ft 10 in (1.78 m)	Fr	Johns Creek HS	Hampton, GA
G	3	Terren Ward	5 ft 11 in (1.8 m)	Jr	Wayne County HS	Jesup, GA
G	4	Constance Thomas	5 ft 8 in (1.73 m)	Jr	Camp Jewell House; Penn State	Plant City, FL
F	5	Diamond Stokes	6 ft 3 in (1.91 m)	Jr	Simeon Career; Wright State	Chicago, IL
G	10	Le'Andrea Gillis	5 ft 10 in (1.78 m)	Sr	Treutlan County HS; Savannah State	Adrian, GA
F	11	Shy Booker	6 ft 1 in (1.85 m)	Sr	Ardrey Kelly HS; Austin Peay State	Charlotte, NC
F	20	Taya Gibson	5 ft 11 in (1.8 m)	Sr	Rome HS; Columbus State	Rome, GA
G	21	Amoni Byrd	5 ft 9 in (1.75 m)	Fr	Archbishop Molloy HS	Bayside, NY
G	22	Ja'nya Love-Hill	5 ft 5 in (1.65 m)	Sr	G.W. Carver HS	Columbus, GA
G	23	Hannah Fuller	5 ft 9 in (1.75 m)	So	Southside Christian	Greenville, SC
F	30	Shondell Vickers	6 ft 2 in (1.88 m)	Sr	Ware County HS; Florida SouthWestern State	Waycross, GA
G	33	Simone James	5 ft 10 in (1.78 m)	Jr	Christian HS	San Diego, CA
F	41	Eden Johnson	6 ft 2 in (1.88 m)	RS Jr	Haines City HS; Fordham	Kissimmee, FL
C	55	Lydia Freeman	6 ft 5 in (1.96 m)	Jr	Westlake HS	Atlanta, GA

Head coach

- Anita Howard (Armstrong State)

Assistant coach(es)

- Deont'a McChester (Tennessee State)
- Elaine Powell (LSU)
- Chris Godfrey (Armstrong State)

Legend

- (C) Team captain
- (S) Suspended
- (I) Ineligible
- (W) Walk-on
- Injured
- Current redshirt

Roster
Last update: December 25, 2022

== Schedule and results ==
Date time, TV	Rank^{#}	Opponent^{#}	Result	Record	High points	High rebounds	High assists	Site city, state
Non-conference regular season
November 7, 2022*; 6:00 p.m., ESPN+		Allen	W 99–47	1–0	15 – Ward	10 – Booker	7 – Thomas	Hanner Fieldhouse (612); Statesboro, GA
November 13, 2022*; 1:00 p.m., ESPN+		at Charleston Southern	W 96–65	2–0	18 – James	7 – Ward	6 – Thomas	Buccaneer Field House (313); Charleston, SC
November 19, 2022*; 5:30 p.m., ESPN+		at Gardner–Webb	L 78–82	2–1	16 – 2 tied	10 – Ward	2 – Johnson	Paul Porter Arena (200); Boiling Springs, NC
November 22, 2022*; 6:00 p.m., CatEye Network		at Bethune–Cookman	W 63–60	3–1	17 – 2 tied	7 – Ward	5 – Love-Hill	Moore Gymnasium (206); Daytona Beach, FL
November 27, 2022*; 2:00 p.m., ESPN+		Life	W 103–65	4–1	15 – 2 tied	12 – Stokes	4 – 2 tied	Hanner Fieldhouse (352); Statesboro, GA
November 30, 2022*; 4:00 p.m., ESPN+		Agnes Scott	W 126–35	5–1	17 – 2 tied	11 – Ward	13 – Thomas	Hanner Fieldhouse (227); Statesboro, GA
December 9, 2022*; 11:00 a.m., ESPN+		Chicago State	W 93–71	6–1	15 – 2 tied	8 – Freeman	6 – Wrister	Hanner Fieldhouse (2,612); Statesboro, GA
December 11, 2022*; 1:00 p.m., ESPN+		at Detroit Mercy	W 82–79 ^{OT}	7–1	16 – Ward	11 – Ward	4 – 2 tied	Calihan Hall (308); Detroit, MI
December 16, 2022*; 6:00 p.m., ESPN+		College of Charleston	W 83–65	8–1	24 – James	12 – Freeman	3 – 4 tied	Hanner Fieldhouse (301); Statesboro, GA
Conference regular season
December 29, 2022; 5:00 p.m., ESPN+		Texas State	L 70-82	8–2 (0–1)	18 – Ward	9 – Ward	5 – 2 tied	Hanner Fieldhouse (589); Statesboro, GA
December 31, 2022; 2:00 p.m., ESPN+		at Arkansas State	W 99–86	9–2 (1–1)	40 – Ward	8 – Gibson	8 – Love-Hill	Hanner Fieldhouse (453); Statesboro, GA
January 5, 2023; 6:00 p.m., ESPN+		at Coastal Carolina	W 81–75	10–2 (2–1)	17 – Ward	10 – Ward	6 – Ward	HTC Center (398); Conway, SC
January 7, 2023; 1:00 p.m., ESPN+		at Marshall	W 83–80	11–2 (3–1)	20 – Ward	8 – Ward	6 – Love-Hill	Cam Henderson Center (678); Huntington, WV
January 12, 2023; 6:00 p.m., ESPN+		Old Dominion	L 82–84 ^{OT}	11–3 (3–2)	20 – Ward	10 – Freeman	4 – Love-Hill	Hanner Fieldhouse (442); Statesboro, GA
January 14, 2023; 2:00 p.m., ESPN+		Appalachian State	L 88–96	11–4 (3–3)	25 – Ward	14 – Ward	7 – Ward	Hanner Fieldhouse (602); Statesboro, GA
January 19, 2023; 7:00 p.m., ESPN+		at James Madison	W 69–65	12–4 (4–3)	23 – Ward	9 – Ward	2 – Love-Hill	Atlantic Union Bank Center (1,903); Harrisonburg, VA
January 21, 2023; 3:00 p.m., ESPN+		at Louisiana–Monroe	W 86–72	13–4 (5–3)	21 – Ward	8 – Freeman	5 – Love-Hill	Fant–Ewing Coliseum (1,491); Monroe, LA
January 26, 2023; 6:00 p.m., ESPN+		Louisiana	L 58–68	13–5 (5–4)	15 – Ward	10 – Ward	3 – 2 tied	Hanner Fieldhouse (686); Statesboro, GA
January 28, 2023; 5:00 p.m., ESPN+		at Troy	L 77–100	13–6 (5–5)	21 – Gibson	16 – Gibson	5 – Love-Hill	Trojan Arena (2,324); Troy, AL
February 2, 2023; 6:00 p.m., ESPN+		Georgia State	W 74–49	14–6 (6–5)	19 – Ward	9 – Ward	7 – Love-Hill	Hanner Fieldhouse (886); Statesboro, GA
February 4, 2023; 2:00 p.m., ESPN+		James Madison	W 72–61	15–6 (7–5)	25 – Ward	8 – Booker	6 – Love-Hill	Hanner Fieldhouse (883); Statesboro, GA
February 9, 2023; 6:30 p.m., ESPN+		at Old Dominion	L 50–67	15–7 (7–6)	14 – Gibson	8 – Gibson	3 – Thomas	Chartway Arena (2,161); Norfolk, VA
February 11, 2023; 2:00 p.m., ESPN+		at Appalachian State	W 84–73	16–7 (8–6)	19 – Ward	10 – 3 tied	5 – Ward	Holmes Center (503); Boone, NC
February 16, 2023; 6:00 p.m., ESPN+		Marshall	W 63–61	17–7 (9–6)	19 – Ward	14 – Ward	4 – Love-Hill	Hanner Fieldhouse (713); Statesboro, GA
February 18, 2023; 2:00 p.m., ESPN+		Coastal Carolina	W 75–66	18–7 (10–6)	16 – Love-Hill	7 – Ward	4 – 2 tied	Hanner Fieldhouse (1,163); Statesboro, GA
February 22, 2023; 8:00 p.m., ESPN+		at South Alabama	W 75–59	19–7 (11–6)	29 – Ward	9 – Gibson	4 – Love-Hill	Mitchell Center (198); Mobile, AL
February 24, 2023; 6:30 p.m., ESPN+		at Georgia State	W 67–61	20–7 (12–6)	17 – Ward	13 – Ward	4 – Ward	Georgia State Convocation Center (695); Atlanta, GA
Sun Belt tournament
March 1, 2023; 6:00 p.m., ESPN+	(6)	vs. (11) Arkansas State; Second round	L 76–81 ^{OT}	20–8	26 – Gibson	14 – Gibson	7 – Love-Hill	Pensacola Bay Center (500); Pensacola, FL
WBI
March 17, 2023*; 7:30 p.m., WatchWBI.com		vs. Northern Illinois; First round	W 69–58	21–8	21 – Ward	9 – Ward	3 – 2 tied	Clive M. Beck Center; Lexington, KY
March 18, 2023*; 7:30 p.m., WatchWBI.com		vs. California Baptist; Semifinals	L 80–82 ^{OT}	21–9	31 – Ward	8 – Johnson	6 – Love-Hill	Clive M. Beck Center; Lexington, KY
March 19, 2023*; 5:00 p.m., WatchWBI.com		vs. East Tennessee State; 3rd-place game	L 49–96	21–10	14 – Stokes	6 – Gibson	2 – 2 tied	Clive M. Beck Center; Lexington, KY
*Non-conference game. ^{#}Rankings from AP poll. (#) Tournament seedings in parentheses. All times are in Eastern.

== See also ==
- 2022–23 Georgia Southern Eagles men's basketball team
