= 2022–23 Old Dominion Monarchs women's basketball team =

Intercollegiate basketball season

2022–23 Old Dominion Monarchs women's basketball
- Conference: Sun Belt Conference
- Record: 22–12 (12–6 Sun Belt)
- Head coach: DeLisha Milton-Jones (3rd season)
- Assistant coaches: Danielle Bell; Shammond Williams; Roland Jones Jr.
- Home arena: Chartway Arena

2022–23 Sun Belt Conference women's basketball standings
	Conf.				Overall
Team	W		L	PCT	W		L	PCT
James Madison †	13	–	5	.722	27	–	8	.771
Texas State	13	–	5	.722	24	–	10	.706
Southern Miss	13	–	5	.722	21	–	10	.677
Georgia Southern	12	–	6	.667	21	–	10	.677
Old Dominion	12	–	6	.667	22	–	13	.629
Troy	12	–	6	.667	17	–	13	.567
Louisiana	10	–	8	.556	22	–	21	.512
Marshall	9	–	9	.500	17	–	14	.548
Coastal Carolina	9	–	9	.500	14	–	17	.452
Arkansas State	6	–	12	.333	13	–	19	.406
Appalachian State	6	–	12	.333	11	–	20	.355
Georgia State	5	–	13	.278	12	–	21	.364
Louisiana–Monroe	3	–	15	.167	7	–	23	.233
South Alabama	3	–	15	.167	7	–	23	.233
† 2023 Sun Belt tournament winner

The 2022–23 Old Dominion Monarchs women's basketball team represented Old Dominion University during the 2022–23 NCAA Division I women's basketball season. The Monarchs, led by third-year head coach DeLisha Milton-Jones, played their home games at the Chartway Arena as members of the Sun Belt Conference. It was their first season back in the Sun Belt after previously leaving to join the CAA in 1991.

The Monarchs finished fifth-ranked in conference play, losing to the James Madison Dukes in the conference tournament semifinals.

== Roster ==
2022–23 Old Dominion Monarchs women's basketball team
Players
Coaches

Pos.	#	Name	Height	Year	Previous school	Hometown
G	0	Joy Campbell	5 ft 6 in (1.68 m)	Jr	Etiwanda HS; UC Riverside	Fontana, California
G	1	Taleah Washington	5 ft 7 in (1.7 m)	Sr	Forestville HS; Syracuse	District Heights, Maryland
G	2	Makayla Dickens	5 ft 8 in (1.73 m)	GS	Princess Anne HS; Boston College	Virginia Beach, Virginia
G	3	Alethea Kara Angeles	5 ft 6 in (1.68 m)	Jr	Emmanuel College; Lamar CC	Melbourne, Australia
G	4	Jordan McLaughlin	5 ft 7 in (1.7 m)	Jr	Phillip O. Berry Acad. Chipola College	Charlotte, North Carolina
G	5	Autumn Dodd	5 ft 9 in (1.75 m)	Jr	Three Rivers College	Neelyville, Missouri
G	11	Kaye Clark	5 ft 7 in (1.7 m)	Sr	Rufus King HS; Trinity Valley CC	Milwaukee, Wisconsin
F	12	Brianna Jackson	6 ft 3 in (1.91 m)	Sr	Princess Anne HS; Miami (Fla.)	Virginia Beach, Virginia
F	14	Jatyjia Jones	5 ft 11 in (1.8 m)	GS	Memphis	Pontotoc, Mississippi
C	20	Jada Duckett	6 ft 2 in (1.88 m)	Jr	Morgan Park HS; Miami (Ohio)	Chicago, Illinois
F	23	Amari Young	5 ft 11 in (1.8 m)	Sr	North Augusta	North Augusta, South Carolina
C	24	Mikayla Brown	6 ft 1 in (1.85 m)	Fr	Lincoln HS	Dallas, Texas
G/F	25	Kaylen Nelson	5 ft 11 in (1.8 m)	So	Union HS	Tulsa, Oklahoma
F	55	Brenda Fontana	6 ft 1 in (1.85 m)	So	Velez Sarsfield; UTEP	Moreno, Argentina

Head coach

- DeLisha Milton-Jones (Florida)

Assistant coach(es)

- Danielle Bell (Georgia)
- Shammond Williams (North Carolina)
- Roland Jones Jr. (Central Methodist)

Legend

- (C) Team captain
- (S) Suspended
- (I) Ineligible
- (W) Walk-on
- Injured
- Current redshirt

Roster
Last update: December 27, 2022

== Schedule and results ==
Date time, TV	Rank^{#}	Opponent^{#}	Result	Record	Site (attendance) city, state
Non-conference regular season
November 7, 2022*; 7:00 p.m., ESPN3		at Florida Gulf Coast	L 62–81	0–1	Alico Arena (2,757); Fort Myers, FL
November 10, 2022*; 6:30 p.m., YouTube		at Texas Southern	W 75–49	1–1	H&PE Arena (385); Houston, TX
November 15, 2022*; 6:30 p.m., ESPN+		William & Mary; Rivalry	W 59–43	2–1	Chartway Arena (2,219); Norfolk, VA
November 19, 2022*; 1:00 p.m., FloSports		at Xavier	L 49–65	2–2	Cintas Center (482); Cincinnati, OH
November 22, 2022*; 2:00 p.m., FloSports		at Elon	L 68–71	2–3	Schar Center (602); Elon, NC
November 27, 2022*; 2:00 p.m., ESPN+		Coppin State	W 70–63	3–3	Chartway Arena (1,711); Norfolk, VA
November 30, 2022*; 6:30 p.m., ESPN+		Temple; Anne Donovan Classic	W 77–65	4–3	Chartway Arena (1,972); Norfolk, VA
December 3, 2022*; 3:00 p.m., ESPN+		at USC Upstate	W 57–31	5–3	G. B. Hodge Center (243); Spartanburg, SC
December 6, 2022*; 11:00 a.m., ESPN+		Lincoln (PA)	W 81–64	6–3	Chartway Arena (6,000); Norfolk, VA
December 8, 2022*; 6:30 p.m., ESPN+		VCU; Rivalry	W 61–44	7–3	Chartway Arena (2,516); Norfolk, VA
December 11, 2022*; 2:00 p.m., ESPN+		Norfolk State; Rivalry	W 65–44	8–3	Chartway Arena (2,124); Norfolk, VA
December 19, 2022*; 1:00 p.m., BallerTV		vs. Mississippi State; Sun Coast Challenge	L 47–83	8–4	Pasco–Hernando State College (135); Tampa, FL
December 20, 2022*; 1:00 p.m., BallerTV		vs. New Mexico; Sun Coast Challenge	L 57–74	8–5	Pasco–Hernando State College (89); Tampa, FL
Sun Belt Conference regular season
December 29, 2022; 6:30 p.m., ESPN+		at Appalachian State	L 55–81	8–6 (0–1)	Holmes Center (387); Boone, NC
December 31, 2022; 2:00 p.m., ESPN+		at James Madison; Royal Rivalry	L 54–68	8–7 (0–2)	Atlantic Union Bank Center (1,929); Harrisonburg, VA
January 5, 2023; 6:30 p.m., ESPN+		Louisiana–Monroe	W 63–49	9–7 (1–2)	Chartway Arena (1,690); Norfolk, VA
January 7, 2023; 2:00 p.m., ESPN+		South Alabama	W 83–43	10–7 (2–2)	Chartway Arena (1,766); Norfolk, VA
January 12, 2023; 6:00 p.m., ESPN+		at Georgia Southern	W 84–82 ^{OT}	11–7 (3–2)	Hanner Fieldhouse (442); Statesboro, GA
January 14, 2023; 4:00 p.m., ESPN+		Marshall	W 63–56	12–7 (4–2)	Chartway Arena (2,695); Norfolk, VA
January 19, 2023; 7:00 p.m., ESPN+		at Louisiana	L 51–61	12–8 (4–3)	Cajundome (429); Lafayette, LA
January 21, 2023; 2:00 p.m., ESPN+		at Georgia State	W 73–70	13–8 (5–3)	Georgia State Convocation Center (545); Atlanta, GA
January 26, 2023; 6:30 p.m., ESPN+		Texas State	L 46–52	13–9 (5–4)	Chartway Arena (1,734); Norfolk, VA
January 28, 2023; 2:00 p.m., ESPN+		Coastal Carolina	W 78–64	14–9 (6–4)	Chartway Arena (2,587); Norfolk, VA
February 2, 2023; 7:00 p.m., ESPN+		at Southern Miss	W 65–55	15–9 (7–4)	Reed Green Coliseum (1,234); Hattiesburg, MS
February 4, 2023; 5:30 p.m., ESPN+		at Arkansas State	W 87–75	16–9 (8–4)	First National Bank Arena (1,402); Jonesboro, AR
February 9, 2023; 6:30 p.m., ESPN+		Georgia Southern	W 67–50	17–9 (9–4)	Chartway Arena (2,161); Norfolk, VA
February 11, 2023; 2:00 p.m., ESPN+		Georgia State	W 60–54	18–9 (10–4)	Chartway Arena (2,397); Norfolk, VA
February 16, 2023; 6:30 p.m., ESPN+		Appalachian State	W 71–65	19–9 (11–4)	Chartway Arena (1,733); Norfolk, VA
February 18, 2023; 12:00 p.m., ESPN3		James Madison; Royal Rivalry	L 68–73 ^{OT}	19–10 (11–5)	Chartway Arena (3,336); Norfolk, VA
February 22, 2023; 6:00 p.m., ESPN+		at Marshall	W 66–63	20–10 (12–5)	Cam Henderson Center (799); Huntington, WV
February 24, 2023; 6:00 p.m., ESPN+		at Coastal Carolina	L 68–76	20–11 (12–6)	HTC Center (487); Conway, SC
Sun Belt tournament
March 1, 2023; 3:00 p.m., ESPN+	(5)	vs. (12) Georgia State; Second Round	W 66–56	21–11	Pensacola Bay Center; Pensacola, FL
March 3, 2023; 3:00 p.m., ESPN+	(5)	vs. (4) Troy; Quarterfinals	W 86–83	22–11	Pensacola Bay Center; Pensacola, FL
March 5, 2023; 12:30 p.m., ESPN+	(5)	vs. (1) James Madison; Semifinals	L 64–70	22–12	Pensacola Bay Center; Pensacola, FL
*Non-conference game. ^{#}Rankings from AP Poll. (#) Tournament seedings in parentheses. All times are in Eastern.

- Source: Old Dominion Athletics

== See also ==
- 2022–23 Old Dominion Monarchs men's basketball team
