= 2022–23 Southern Miss Lady Eagles basketball team =

American college basketball season

2022–23 Southern Miss Lady Eagles basketball

Sun Belt co-regular-season champions
- Conference: Sun Belt Conference
- Record: 21–10 (13–5 Sun Belt)
- Head coach: Joye Lee-McNelis (19th season)
- Assistant coaches: Jack Trosper; Patosha Jeffery; Kaitlynn Pacholke
- Home arena: Reed Green Coliseum

2022–23 Sun Belt Conference women's basketball standings
	Conf.				Overall
Team	W		L	PCT	W		L	PCT
James Madison †	13	–	5	.722	27	–	8	.771
Texas State	13	–	5	.722	24	–	10	.706
Southern Miss	13	–	5	.722	21	–	10	.677
Georgia Southern	12	–	6	.667	21	–	10	.677
Old Dominion	12	–	6	.667	22	–	13	.629
Troy	12	–	6	.667	17	–	13	.567
Louisiana	10	–	8	.556	22	–	21	.512
Marshall	9	–	9	.500	17	–	14	.548
Coastal Carolina	9	–	9	.500	14	–	17	.452
Arkansas State	6	–	12	.333	13	–	19	.406
Appalachian State	6	–	12	.333	11	–	20	.355
Georgia State	5	–	13	.278	12	–	21	.364
Louisiana–Monroe	3	–	15	.167	7	–	23	.233
South Alabama	3	–	15	.167	7	–	23	.233
† 2023 Sun Belt tournament winner

The 2022–23 Southern Miss Lady Eagles basketball team represented the University of Southern Mississippi during the 2022–23 NCAA Division I women's basketball season. The team was led by 19th-year head coach Joye Lee-McNelis, and played their home games at the Reed Green Coliseum in Hattiesburg, Mississippi as a member of the Sun Belt Conference.

The Lady Eagles finished as co-conference regular-season champions with a record of 21–10 overall and 13–5 in conference play.

== Previous season ==
The Lady Eagles finished 18–12 and 9–8 in conference play for the 2021–22 basketball season. They lost in the conference tournament quarterfinal to Middle Tennessee, 50–70, and were unable to secure a bid into the NCAA tournament.

In March 2022, Southern Miss, as well as C-USA members Old Dominion and Marshall, announced that they would be joining the Sun Belt Conference effective July 1, 2022 to compete as full-time members for the 2022–23 season.

== Schedule and results ==
Date time, TV	Rank^{#}	Opponent^{#}	Result	Record	Site (attendance) city, state
Exhibition
November 2, 2022*; 6:00 p.m.		Auburn Montgomery	W 81–78		Reed Green Coliseum; Hattiesburg, MS
Non-conference regular season
November 7, 2022*; 11:00 a.m., ESPN+		William Carey	W 81–58	1–0	Reed Green Coliseum (2,304); Hattiesburg, MS
November 12, 2022*; 12:00 p.m., ESPN3		at Valparaiso	L 65–72	1–1	Athletics–Recreation Center (330); Valparaiso, IN
November 16, 2022*; 6:00 p.m., SECN+		at Ole Miss	L 46–92	1–2	SJB Pavilion (1,693); University, MS
November 18, 2022*; 6:00 p.m., ESPN+		North Alabama	W 72–67	2–2	Reed Green Coliseum (1,303); Hattiesburg, MS
November 25, 2022*; 3:00 p.m., ESPN+		Nicholls; Lady Eagle Thanksgiving Classic	W 83–68	3–2	Reed Green Coliseum (893); Hattiesburg, MS
November 26, 2022*; 5:00 p.m., ESPN+		Lamar; Lady Eagle Thanksgiving Classic	W 56–48	4–2	Reed Green Coliseum (829); Hattiesburg, MS
November 30, 2022*; 6:00 p.m., ESPN+		Mississippi College	W 74–42	5–2	Reed Green Coliseum (859); Hattiesburg, MS
December 3, 2022*; 7:00 p.m., ESPN+		at Samford	L 59–71	5–3	Pete Hanna Center (235); Homewood, AL
December 11, 2022*; 2:00 p.m., ESPN+		Alabama	L 47–56	5–4	Reed Green Coliseum (1,037); Hattiesburg, MS
December 16, 2022*; 3:00 p.m.		vs. UC Irvine; Long Beach Classic	W 50–45	6–4	Walter Pyramid; Long Beach, CA
December 17, 2022*; 5:30 p.m., ESPN+		vs. Long Beach State; Long Beach Classic	W 56–50	7–4	Walter Pyramid (607); Long Beach, CA
Sun Belt regular season
December 29, 2022; 6:00 p.m., ESPN+		at Troy	W 77–75	8–4 (1–0)	Trojan Arena (1,872); Troy, AL
December 31, 2022; 1:00 p.m., ESPN+		at South Alabama	W 58–37	9–4 (2–0)	Mitchell Center (267); Mobile, AL
January 5, 2023; 6:00 p.m., ESPN+		Louisiana	W 44–43	10–4 (3–0)	Reed Green Coliseum (725); Hattiesburg, MS
January 7, 2023; 2:00 p.m., ESPN+		James Madison	L 54–63	10–5 (3–1)	Reed Green Coliseum (920); Hattiesburg, MS
January 12, 2023; 6:00 p.m., ESPN+		Arkansas State	W 61–36	11–5 (4–1)	Reed Green Coliseum (850); Hattiesburg, MS
January 14, 2023; 2:00 p.m., ESPN+		Louisiana–Monroe	W 77–57	12–5 (5–1)	Reed Green Coliseum (896); Hattiesburg, MS
January 19, 2023; 5:30 p.m., ESPN+		at Appalachian State	W 75–68	13–5 (6–1)	Holmes Center (450); Boone, NC
January 21, 2023; 12:00 p.m., ESPN+		at Marshall	L 52–53	13–6 (6–2)	Cam Henderson Center (472); Huntington, WV
January 26, 2023; 7:00 p.m., ESPN+		at Arkansas State	W 68–59	14–6 (7–2)	First National Bank Arena (1,014); Jonesboro, AR
January 28, 2023; 4:00 p.m., ESPN+		at Texas State	L 52–62 ^{OT}	14–7 (7–3)	Strahan Arena (1,053); San Marcos, TX
February 2, 2023; 6:00 p.m., ESPN+		Old Dominion	L 55–65	14–8 (7–4)	Reed Green Coliseum (1,234); Hattiesburg, MS
February 4, 2023; 2:00 p.m., ESPN+		South Alabama	W 61–40	15–8 (8–4)	Reed Green Coliseum (1,449); Hattiesburg, MS
February 9, 2023; 5:00 p.m., ESPN+		Texas State	L 52–69	15–9 (8–5)	Reed Green Coliseum (8,097); Hattiesburg, MS
February 11, 2023; 12:00 p.m., ESPN+		Coastal Carolina	W 80–68	16–9 (9–5)	Reed Green Coliseum (4,578); Hattiesburg, MS
February 16, 2023; 10:00 p.m., ESPN+		at Georgia State	W 71–57	17–9 (10–5)	GSU Convocation Center (467); Atlanta, GA
February 18, 2023; 2:00 p.m., ESPN3		at Louisiana–Monroe	W 84–82 ^{OT}	18–9 (11–5)	Fant–Ewing Coliseum (1,012); Monroe, LA
February 22, 2023; 6:00 p.m., ESPN+		Troy	W 88–79	19–9 (12–5)	Reed Green Coliseum (1,023); Hattiesburg, MS
February 24, 2023; 5:00 p.m., ESPN+		at Louisiana	W 69–64 ^{OT}	20–9 (13–5)	Cajundome (793); Lafayette, LA
Sun Belt tournament
March 3, 2023; 5:00 p.m., ESPN+	(3)	vs. (11) Arkansas State; Quarterfinals	W 79–72	21–9	Pensacola Bay Center; Pensacola, FL
March 5, 2023; 2:00 p.m., ESPN+	(3)	vs. (2) Texas State; Semifinals	L 57–85	21–10	Pensacola Bay Center; Pensacola, FL
*Non-conference game. ^{#}Rankings from AP poll. (#) Tournament seedings in parentheses. All times are in Central.

== See also ==
- 2022–23 Southern Miss Golden Eagles basketball team
