= Sean O'Regan =

American basketball coach (born 1980)

Current position
- Title: Head coach
- Team: James Madison
- Conference: Sun Belt
- Record: 236–90 (.724)

Biographical details
- Born: December 24, 1980 (age 45); Montpelier, Vermont, U.S.
- Education: James Madison ('03)

Coaching career (HC unless noted)
- 2005–2007: Evansville (men's asst.)
- 2007–2016: James Madison (women's asst.)
- 2016–present: James Madison

Administrative career (AD unless noted)
- 2004–2005: Evansville (Director of Ops.)

Head coaching record
- Overall: 236–90 (.724)

Accomplishments and honors

Championships
- 3x CAA Regular Season (2018, 2019, 2020); 2x Sun Belt Regular Season (2023 2025); 2x Sun Belt Tournament (2023, 2026)

Awards
- Sun Belt Coach of the Year (2025)

Sean O'Regan (born December 24, 1980) is the current head coach of the James Madison University women's basketball team.

== Career ==
Coach O'Regan previously served as associate head coach for nine years under Coach Kenny Brooks. He is an alumnus of James Madison and was a student manager of the men's basketball team before graduating in 2003.

== Head coaching record ==
Record table
Season	Team	Overall	Conference	Standing	Postseason
James Madison Dukes (Colonial Athletic Association) (2016–2022)
2016–17	James Madison	26–9	15–3	2nd	WNIT Third Round
2017–18	James Madison	23–11	16–2	T–1st	WNIT Third Round
2018–19	James Madison	29–6	17–1	1st	WNIT Semifinal
2019–20	James Madison	25–4	16–2	T–1st	
2020–21	James Madison	14–10	9–6	2nd	
2021–22	James Madison	14–15	10–8	4th	
James Madison Dukes (Sun Belt Conference) (2022–present)
2022–23	James Madison	26–8	13–5	T–1st	NCAA First Round
2023–24	James Madison	23–12	13–5	3rd	WBIT First Round
2024–25	James Madison	30–6	18–0	1st	WBIT Quarterfinals
2025–26	James Madison	26–9	14–4	T–3rd	NCAA First Round
James Madison:		236–90 (.724)	141–36 (.797)		
Total:		236–90 (.724)			
National champion Postseason invitational champion Conference regular season champion Conference regular season and conference tournament champion Division regular season champion Division regular season and conference tournament champion Conference tournament champion
