= 2016–17 Arkansas State Red Wolves women's basketball team =

Intercollegiate basketball season

2016–17 Arkansas State Red Wolves women's basketball
- Conference: Sun Belt Conference
- Record: 7–25 (4–14 Sun Belt)
- Head coach: Brian Boyer (17th season)
- Assistant coaches: Autumn Rademacher; Deidra Johnson; Aundrea Gamble
- Home arena: Convocation Center

2016–17 Sun Belt Conference women's basketball standings
	Conf.				Overall
Team	W		L	PCT	W		L	PCT
Little Rock	17	–	1	.944	25	–	8	.758
UT Arlington	14	–	4	.778	22	–	8	.733
Troy †	12	–	6	.667	22	–	10	.688
Louisiana–Lafayette	11	–	7	.611	20	–	11	.645
Texas State	11	–	7	.611	16	–	14	.533
Georgia Southern	9	–	9	.500	13	–	17	.433
Coastal Carolina	8	–	10	.444	13	–	16	.448
Georgia State	8	–	10	.444	12	–	18	.400
Appalachian State	6	–	12	.333	12	–	19	.387
South Alabama	5	–	13	.278	11	–	20	.355
Arkansas State	4	–	14	.222	7	–	25	.219
Louisiana–Monroe	3	–	15	.167	6	–	24	.200
† 2017 Sun Belt tournament winner

The 2016–17 Arkansas State Red Wolves women's basketball team represented Arkansas State University during the 2016–17 NCAA Division I women's basketball season. The Red Wolves, led by seventeenth year head coach Brian Boyer, played their home games at the Convocation Center in Jonesboro, Arkansas as members of the Sun Belt Conference. They finished the season 7–25, 4–14 in Sun Belt play to finish in eleventh place. They advanced to the quarterfinals of the Sun Belt women's tournament, where they lost to Troy.

== Roster ==
2016–17 Arkansas State Red Wolves women's basketball team
Players
Coaches

Pos.	#	Name	Height	Year	Previous school	Hometown
G	0	Jada Ford	5 ft 9 in (1.75 m)	Fr	Muskogee HS	Muskogee, OK
F	1	Lauren Bradshaw	6 ft 2 in (1.88 m)	Jr	Mesquite Horn HS	Mesquite, TX
G	2	Starr Taylor	5 ft 6 in (1.68 m)	Fr	Jonesboro HS	Jonesboro, AR
F	3	Aaliyah Warren	6 ft 3 in (1.91 m)	RS So	MacArthur HS	Irving, TX
G	5	Payton Tennison	5 ft 11 in (1.8 m)	Fr	Valley Springs HS	Valley Springs, AR
G	10	Akasha Westbrook	5 ft 10 in (1.78 m)	Jr	Malvern HS	Malvern, AR
G	13	Brittany Fowler	5 ft 8 in (1.73 m)	Sr	Buffalo Island Central HS	Leachville, AR
G	23	Tayton Hopkins	5 ft 8 in (1.73 m)	Fr	Homeschool; Farmington HS	Farmington, AR
F	24	Tahlon Hopkins	5 ft 11 in (1.8 m)	Fr	Homeschool; Farmington HS	Farmington, AR
G	25	Dominique Oliver	5 ft 6 in (1.68 m)	Sr	Rowlett HS	Rowlett, TX
F	30	Ebony Day	6 ft 2 in (1.88 m)	Fr	Marion HS	Marion, AR
F	33	Ogo Obinabo	6 ft 2 in (1.88 m)	Jr	Plano HS	Plano, TX
F	50	Madison Heckert	6 ft 4 in (1.93 m)	Fr	West Carroll HS	Atwood, TN

Head coach

- Brian Boyer (Missouri Western)

Assistant coach(es)

- Autumn Rademacher (Detroit Mercy)
- Deidra Johnson (Oklahoma State)
- Aundrea Gamble (Arkansas State)

Legend

- (C) Team captain
- (S) Suspended
- (I) Ineligible
- (W) Walk-on
- Injured
- Current redshirt

Roster

== Schedule ==
Date time, TV	Rank^{#}	Opponent^{#}	Result	Record	Site (attendance) city, state
Exhibition
11/01/2016*; 7:00 pm		Arkansas–Monticello	W 73–55		Convocation Center (816); Jonesboro, AR
11/06/2016*; 2:00 pm		Harding	W 83–73		Convocation Center; Jonesboro, AR
Non-conference regular season
11/11/2016*; 11:00 am		at Oklahoma State	L 34–76	0–1	Gallagher-Iba Arena (3,124); Stillwater, OK
11/16/2016*; 7:00 pm		at Austin Peay	L 55–62	0–2	Dunn Center (1,137); Clarksville, TN
11/19/2016*; 12:00 pm		at Tennessee State	L 66–76	0–3	Gentry Complex (328); Nashville, TN
11/22/2016*; 5:30 pm		No. 19 Florida	L 60–71	0–4	Convocation Center; Jonesboro, AR
11/27/2016*; 2:00 pm		at Iowa State	L 53–105	0–5	Hilton Coliseum (6,398); Ames, IA
12/02/2016*; 12:00 pm, ESPN3		at Wichita State	L 51–69	0–6	Charles Koch Arena (9,534); Wichita, KS
12/06/2016*; 7:00 pm		Tulsa	W 83–80	1–6	Convocation Center (836); Jonesboro, AR
12/11/2016*; 2:00 pm		No. 22 South Florida	L 59–78	1–7	Convocation Center (1,058); Jonesboro, AR
12/14/2016*; 11:00 am		at UT Martin	L 63–68	1–8	Skyhawk Arena (4,114); Martin, TN
12/19/2016*; 2:00 pm		vs. Kennesaw State; Puerto Rico Classic	W 70–67	2–8	South Point Arena; Enterprise, NV
12/20/2016*; 4:15 pm		vs. Northern Kentucky; Puerto Rico Classic	L 78–83	2–9	South Point Arena (86); Enterprise, NV
12/21/2016*; 11:15 pm		vs. California; Puerto Rico Classic	L 55–80	2–10	South Point Arena (95); Enterprise, NV
Sun Belt regular season
12/29/2016; 7:00 pm		Louisiana–Monroe	W 71–56	3–10 (1–0)	Convocation Center (760); Jonesboro, AR
12/31/2016; 2:30 pm		Louisiana–Lafayette	L 72–80	3–11 (1–1)	Convocation Center; Jonesboro, AR
01/05/2017; 6:00 pm		at Appalachian State	L 50–76	3–12 (1–2)	Holmes Center (227); Boone, NC
01/07/2017; 12:00 pm		at Coastal Carolina	L 55–57	3–13 (1–3)	HTC Center (295); Conway, SC
01/14/2017; 4:00 pm		at Little Rock	L 59–73	3–14 (1–4)	Jack Stephens Center; Little Rock, AR
01/19/2017; 7:00 pm, ESPN3		South Alabama	W 56–53	4–14 (2–4)	Convocation Center (747); Jonesboro, AR
01/21/2017; 3:00 pm, ESPN3		Troy	L 75–83	4–15 (2–5)	Convocation Center (1,425); Jonesboro, AR
01/26/2016; 7:00 pm		at Louisiana–Lafayette	L 60–72	4–16 (2–6)	Cajundome (558); Lafayette, LA
01/28/2016; 2:00 pm		at Louisiana–Monroe	L 51–59	4–17 (2–7)	Fant–Ewing Coliseum; Monroe, LA
02/02/2017; 7:00 pm, ESPN3		Coastal Carolina	W 60–52	5–17 (3–7)	Convocation Center (619); Jonesboro, AR
02/04/2017; 3:00 pm, ESPN3		Appalachian State	L 72–81 ^{OT}	5–18 (3–8)	Convocation Center (797); Jonesboro, AR
02/09/2017; 12:00 pm		at Texas State	L 43–63	5–19 (3–9)	Strahan Coliseum (3,042); San Marcos, TX
02/11/2017; 3:00 pm		at Texas–Arlington	L 58–69	5–20 (3–10)	College Park Center; Arlington, TX
02/17/2017; 5:30 pm, ESPN3		Little Rock	L 35–60	5–21 (3–11)	Convocation Center; Jonesboro, AR
02/23/2017; 7:00 pm, ESPN3		Georgia State	W 59–57	6–21 (4–11)	Convocation Center (463); Jonesboro, AR
02/25/2017; 3:00 pm, ESPN3		Georgia Southern	L 76–84	6–22 (4–12)	Convocation Center (718); Jonesboro, AR
03/02/2017; 6:00 pm, ESPN3		at Troy	L 77–90	6–23 (4–13)	Trojan Arena (1,221); Troy, AL
03/04/2017; 1:00 pm		at South Alabama	L 49–71	6–24 (4–14)	Mitchell Center; Mobile, AL
Sun Belt Women's Tournament
03/07/2017; 8:30 pm, ESPN3	(11)	vs. (6) Georgia Southern; First round	W 61–50	7–24	Lakefront Arena; New Orleans, LA
03/09/2017; 8:30 pm, ESPN3	(11)	vs. (3) Troy; Quarterfinals	L 72–105	7–25	Lakefront Arena; New Orleans, LA
*Non-conference game. ^{#}Rankings from AP Poll. (#) Tournament seedings in parentheses. All times are in Eastern Time.

== See also ==
- 2016–17 Arkansas State Red Wolves men's basketball team
