= 2016–17 Louisiana–Lafayette Ragin' Cajuns women's basketball team =

Intercollegiate basketball season

2016–17 Louisiana–Lafayette Ragin' Cajuns women's basketball

Sun Belt Tournament, Championship Game (L, Troy 64–78)
- Conference: Sun Belt Conference
- Record: 20–11 (11–7 Sun Belt)
- Head coach: Garry Brodhead (5th season)
- Assistant coaches: Deacon Jones; Katherine Katz; Amber Gregg
- Home arena: Cajundome; Blackham Coliseum (2 games)

2016–17 Sun Belt Conference women's basketball standings
	Conf.				Overall
Team	W		L	PCT	W		L	PCT
Little Rock	17	–	1	.944	25	–	8	.758
UT Arlington	14	–	4	.778	22	–	8	.733
Troy †	12	–	6	.667	22	–	10	.688
Louisiana–Lafayette	11	–	7	.611	20	–	11	.645
Texas State	11	–	7	.611	16	–	14	.533
Georgia Southern	9	–	9	.500	13	–	17	.433
Coastal Carolina	8	–	10	.444	13	–	16	.448
Georgia State	8	–	10	.444	12	–	18	.400
Appalachian State	6	–	12	.333	12	–	19	.387
South Alabama	5	–	13	.278	11	–	20	.355
Arkansas State	4	–	14	.222	7	–	25	.219
Louisiana–Monroe	3	–	15	.167	6	–	24	.200
† 2017 Sun Belt tournament winner

The 2016–17 Louisiana–Lafayette Ragin' Cajuns women's basketball team represented the University of Louisiana at Lafayette during the 2016–17 NCAA Division I women's basketball season. The Ragin' Cajuns were led by fifth-year head coach Garry Brodhead and played all home games at the Cajundome with a select few at Blackham Coliseum during the Cajundome renovations towards the beginning of the season, the first games played there in thirty years. This is also one of the first years that women's basketball does not play at Earl K. Long Gymnasium, their previous on-campus home, at any time during the season They were members in the Sun Belt Conference. They finished the season 20-11, 11–7 in Sun Belt play to finish in fourth place. They advanced to the championship game of the Sun Belt women's tournament where they lost to Troy by the score of 64-78. They did not compete in any other postseason tournaments.

== Previous season ==
The Ragin' Cajuns finished the 2016–17 season 25-10, 13–7 in Sun Belt play to finish third in the conference. They made it to the 2016 Sun Belt Conference Women's Basketball semifinal game after defeating UT Arlington in the first round game before losing to Little Rock in the semifinals. They would continue to be invited to the Women's Basketball Invitational for the second time in two years after previously winning the Championship, and would eventually be crowned National Champions again in the WBI after defeating Northwestern State, Stetson, Youngstown State, and Weber State in the First Round, Second Round, Semifinals, and Championship Game, respectively.

== Roster ==
2016–17 Louisiana-Lafayette Ragin' Cajuns women's basketball team
Players
Coaches

Pos.	#	Name	Height	Year	Previous school	Hometown
F	1	Kimberly Burton	5 ft 11 in (1.8 m)	Fr	Red River HS	Shreveport, LA
G	2	Jasmine Thomas	5 ft 7 in (1.7 m)	Fr	North Caddo HS	Vivian, LA
C	3	Breionne Cooper	6 ft 3 in (1.91 m)	So	West Jefferson HS	New Orleans, LA
G	4	Malachi-Seraphin Williams	5 ft 7 in (1.7 m)	Fr	Putnam City North HS	Oklahoma City, OK
G	10	Troi Swain	5 ft 6 in (1.68 m)	Jr	McNeil HS; Trinity Valley CC	Round Rock, TX
G	11	Jaylyn Gordon	5 ft 5 in (1.65 m)	Sr	West St. John HS	Edgard, LA
G/F	15	Jodi Quinn	5 ft 7 in (1.7 m)	Jr	St. Thomas More HS	St. Martinville, LA
G/F	20	Brooke Jolivette	5 ft 10 in (1.78 m)	So	Kingwood HS; North Texas	Houston, TX
F	21	Nekia Jones	5 ft 11 in (1.8 m)	RS Jr	Ozen HS; Texas	Beaumont, TX
F	22	Gabby Alexander	5 ft 11 in (1.8 m)	Sr	Bogalusa HS	Bogalusa, LA
F	32	Simone Fields	6 ft 0 in (1.83 m)	Jr	Converse Judson HS	San Antonio, TX
C	33	Alex Weeks	6 ft 4 in (1.93 m)	So	Beau Chene HS	Opelousas, LA
F	35	Brittney Myles	6 ft 2 in (1.88 m)	Fr	Fair Park HS	Shreveport, LA
G/F	42	Danyale Bayonne	5 ft 10 in (1.78 m)	Fr	Pineville HS	Pineville, LA

Head coach

- Garry Boadhead (Louisiana)

Assistant coach(es)

- Deacon Jones (Louisiana)
- Katherine Katz (Birmingham–Southern
- Amber Gregg (Texas–San Antonio)

Legend

- (C) Team captain
- (S) Suspended
- (I) Ineligible
- (W) Walk-on
- Injured
- Current redshirt

Roster
Last update: March 3, 2019

== Schedule and results ==
Date time, TV	Rank^{#}	Opponent^{#}	Result	Record	High points	High rebounds	High assists	Site (attendance) city, state
Exhibition
11/07/2016*; 7:00 pm		LSU–Alexandria	W 101-55		20 – Gordon	10 – Fields	3 – Thomas	Blackham Coliseum (469); Lafayette, LA
Non-conference regular season
11/12/2016*; 2:00 pm		at McNeese State	W 77-70	1-0	28 – Fields	13 – Fields	3 – Thomas	Burton Coliseum (375); Lake Charles, LA
Exhibition
11/19/2016*; 2:00 pm		Dillard	W 78-52		24 – Fields	7 – Fields	5 – Gordon	Blackham Coliseum (269); Lafayette, LA
Non-conference regular season
11/22/2016*; 7:00 pm		vs. No. 1 Notre Dame; Homecoming Game for Brianna Turner	L 51-91	1-1	16 – Gordon	5 – Team	2 – Swain	Tudor Fieldhouse (767); Houston, TX
11/25/2016*; 12:00 pm		vs. Southeast Missouri State; Southern Miss Invitational	W 82-78 ^{OT}	2-1	27 – Fields	16 – Fields	4 – Gordon	Reed Green Coliseum (1,190); Hattiesburg, MS
11/26/2016*; 4:00 pm		vs. Southern Miss; Southern Miss Invitational	L 49-71	2-2	21 – Gordon	9 – Fields	3 – Thomas	Reed Green Coliseum (1,169); Hattiesburg, MS
12/01/2016*; 5:00 pm		Xavier (LA)	W 74-55	3-2	15 – Alexander	9 – Alexander	4 – Gordon	Cajundome (1,007); Lafayette, LA
12/10/2016*; 5:00 pm		Southern-New Orleans	W 87-57	4-2	20 – Gordon	12 – Myles	5 – Thomas	Cajundome (981); Lafayette, LA
12/14/2016*; 11:00 am		Houston; Third-Annual Education Game	L 64-69	4-3	20 – Fields	8 – Fields	7 – Thomas	Cajundome (2,203); Lafayette, LA
12/19/2016*; 6:00 pm		Southeastern Louisiana	W 86-77	5-3	23 – Swain	11 – Alexander	4 – Jones	Cajundome (308); Lafayette, LA
12/22/2016*; 7:00 pm		Louisiana Tech	W 80-72	6-3	23 – Swain	9 – Fields	8 – Jones	Cajundome (774); Lafayette, LA
Sun Belt regular season
12/29/2016; 6:30 pm		at Little Rock	L 60-64	6-4	16 – Thomas	6 – Thomas	5 – Gordon	Jack Stephens Center (828); Little Rock, AR
12/31/2016; 2:30 pm		at Arkansas State	W 80-72	7-4	21 – Gordon	10 – Alexander	6 – Gordon	First National Bank Arena; Jonesboro, AR
01/07/2017; 5:00 pm		Louisiana-Monroe	W 67-57	8-4	25 – Fields	10 – Fields	4 – Gordon	Cajundome (899); Lafayette, LA
01/12/2017; 7:00 pm		Georgia State	W 72-65	9-4	21 – Thomas	8 – Fields	4 – Thomas	Cajundome (527); Lafayette, LA
01/14/2017; 5:00 pm		Georgia Southern	W 79-52	10-4	25 – Gordon	12 – Fields	7 – Thomas	Cajundome (886); Lafayette, LA
01/19/2017; 7:00 pm		at UT Arlington	L 66-79	10-5	23 – Gordon	6 – Jones	3 – Thomas	College Park Center (554); Arlington, TX
01/21/2017; 2:00 pm		at Texas State	L 40-62	10-6	13 – Fields	10 – Fields	2 – Gordon	Strahan Coliseum; San Marcos, TX
01/26/2017; 7:00 pm		Arkansas State	W 72-60	11-6	21 – Thomas	9 – Burton	5 – Gordon	Cajundome (558); Lafayette, LA
01/28/2017; 5:00 pm		Little Rock	W 64-28	11-7	29 – Gordon	5 – Fields	2 – Thomas	Cajundome (771); Lafayette, LA
02/02/2017; 6:00 pm		at Georgia Southern	L 60-63	11-8	15 – Williams	8 – Burton	6 – Gordon	Hanner Fieldhouse (408); Stateboro, GA
02/04/2017; 11:00 am		at Georgia State	W 70-64	12-8	22 – Gordon	7 – Swain	5 – Gordon	GSU Sports Arena (420); Atlanta, GA
02/09/2017; 7:00 pm		South Alabama	W 62-38	13-8	29 – Gordon	6 – Alexander	2 – Jones	Cajundome (612); Lafayette, LA
02/11/2017; 5:00 pm, ESPN3		Troy; Breast Cancer Awareness Game	W 80-72	14-8	24 – Fields	8 – Swain	9 – Gordon	Cajundome (1,024); Lafayette, LA
02/18/2017; 12:00 pm, ESPN3		at Louisiana-Monroe	W 65-59	15-8	21 – Fields	7 – Jones	5 – Jones	Fant-Ewing Coliseum (2,451); Monroe, LA
02/23/2017; 6:00 pm, ESPN3		at Appalachian State	W 68-58	16-8	17 – Swain	7 – Swain	4 – Thomas	Holmes Center (174); Boone, NC
02/25/2017; 12:00 pm		at Coastal Carolina	L 68-71	16-9	18 – Gordon	8 – Tied	4 – Swain	HTC Center (323); Conway, SC
03/02/2017; 5:00 pm		Texas State	W 62-43	17-9	20 – Gordon	5 – Jones	4 – Swain	Cajundome (427); Lafayette, LA
03/04/2017; 5:00 pm		UT Arlington	L 76-79	17-10	19 – Swain	7 – Fields	4 – Jones	Cajundome (1,284); Lafayette, LA
Sun Belt Women's Tournament
03/07/2017; 2:00 pm, ESPN3	(5)	vs. (12) Louisiana-Monroe; First Round	W 79-72	18-10	19 – Jones	16 – Fields	6 – Swain	Lakefront Arena; New Orleans, LA
03/09/2017; 2:00 pm, ESPN3	(5)	vs. (4) Texas State; Quarterfinals	W 66-64	19-10	17 – Gordon	6 – Burton	4 – Thomas	Lakefront Arena; New Orleans, LA
03/11/2017; 5:00 pm, ESPN3	(5)	vs. (1) Little Rock; Semifinals	W 79-71	20-10	21 – Gordon	8 – Fields	4 – Jones	Lakefront Arena; New Orleans, LA
03/12/2017; 6:00 pm, ESPN3	(5)	vs. (3) Troy; Championship	L 64-78	20-11	20 – Swain	6 – Jones	5 – Gordon	Lakefront Arena; New Orleans, LA
*Non-conference game. ^{#}Rankings from AP Poll. (#) Tournament seedings in parentheses. All times are in Central Time.

== See also ==
- 2016–17 Louisiana–Lafayette Ragin' Cajuns men's basketball team
