= 2016–17 Georgia Southern Eagles women's basketball team =

Intercollegiate basketball season

2016–17 Georgia Southern Eagles women's basketball
- Conference: Sun Belt Conference
- Record: 13–17 (9–9 Sun Belt)
- Head coach: Kip Drown (2nd season)
- Assistant coaches: Lisa Jackson; Alex Stewart; Toby Wagoner; Taylor Fox
- Home arena: Hanner Fieldhouse

2016–17 Sun Belt Conference women's basketball standings
	Conf.				Overall
Team	W		L	PCT	W		L	PCT
Little Rock	17	–	1	.944	25	–	8	.758
UT Arlington	14	–	4	.778	22	–	8	.733
Troy †	12	–	6	.667	22	–	10	.688
Louisiana–Lafayette	11	–	7	.611	20	–	11	.645
Texas State	11	–	7	.611	16	–	14	.533
Georgia Southern	9	–	9	.500	13	–	17	.433
Coastal Carolina	8	–	10	.444	13	–	16	.448
Georgia State	8	–	10	.444	12	–	18	.400
Appalachian State	6	–	12	.333	12	–	19	.387
South Alabama	5	–	13	.278	11	–	20	.355
Arkansas State	4	–	14	.222	7	–	25	.219
Louisiana–Monroe	3	–	15	.167	6	–	24	.200
† 2017 Sun Belt tournament winner

The 2016–17 Georgia Southern Eagles women's basketball team represented Georgia Southern University in the 2016–17 NCAA Division I women's basketball season. The Eagles, led by second year head coach Kip Drown, played their home games at Hanner Fieldhouse and were members of the Sun Belt Conference. They finished the season 13–17, 9–9 in Sun Belt play to finish in sixth place. They lost in the first round of the Sun Belt women's tournament to Arkansas State.

== Roster ==
2016–17 Georgia Southern Eagles women's basketball team
Players
Coaches

Pos.	#	Name	Height	Year	Previous school	Hometown
G	0	Alexis Brown	5 ft 6 in (1.68 m)	Fr	Morgan County HS	Madison, GA
G	1	Bri Reece	5 ft 5 in (1.65 m)	Jr	Liberty County HS	Hinesville, GA
G	2	Trellanie English-Lurry	5 ft 7 in (1.7 m)	Jr	Nova HS	Miami, FL
G	4	Jakayvea Akins	5 ft 6 in (1.68 m)	RS So	Effingham County HS	Clyo, GA
G/F	5	Alexis Foulks	6 ft 0 in (1.83 m)	Jr	Columbia HS	Columbia, SC
G/F	11	Angel McGowan	5 ft 9 in (1.75 m)	Sr	J. L. Mann HS	Greenville, SC
G/F	13	Nakol Franks	5 ft 7 in (1.7 m)	Fr	Wren HS	Greenville, SC
G	15	Amira Atwater	5 ft 6 in (1.68 m)	Fr	Douglas County HS	Douglasville, GA
G	23	Alexis Sams	5 ft 5 in (1.65 m)	RS Sr	Lake Brantley HS	Orlando, FL
G/F	24	Rhein Beamon	5 ft 8 in (1.73 m)	So	Stephenson HS	Stone Mountain, GA
F/C	25	Sierra Butler	6 ft 2 in (1.88 m)	Jr	Norcross HS	Norcross, GA
F	32	Hailey Dias-Allen	6 ft 2 in (1.88 m)	Fr	Southeast Guilford HS	Greensboro, NC
F	33	Victoria Stavropoulos	6 ft 0 in (1.83 m)	Fr	Carl Sandburg HS	Orland Park, IL
F/C	35	Patrice Butler	6 ft 2 in (1.88 m)	RS Sr	Norcross HS; Furman	Norcross, GA
F	44	Jessica Marcus	6 ft 0 in (1.83 m)	Sr	Berry Academy	Charlotte, NC

Head coach

- Kip Drown (Missouri State)

Assistant coach(es)

- Lisa Jackson (Erskine)
- Kelly Mathis (Pfeiffer)
- Toby Wagoner (Eastern Illinois)
- Taylor Fox (CSU Pueblo)

Legend

- (C) Team captain
- (S) Suspended
- (I) Ineligible
- (W) Walk-on
- Injured
- Current redshirt

Roster

== Schedule ==
Date time, TV	Rank^{#}	Opponent^{#}	Result	Record	Site (attendance) city, state
Exhibition
11/01/2016*; 7:00 pm		Coastal Georgia	W 96–44		Hanner Fieldhouse (197); Statesboro, GA
Non-conference regular season
11/11/2016*; 7:00 pm		North Carolina A&T	W 65–50	1–0	Hanner Fieldhouse (315); Statesboro, GA
11/13/2016*; 2:00 pm		Thomas (GA)	W 106–43	2–0	Hanner Fieldhouse (224); Statesboro, GA
11/16/2016*; 6:00 pm		at Clemson	L 47–58	2–1	Littlejohn Coliseum (368); Clemson, SC
11/20/2016*; 4:30 pm		at Jacksonville State	L 55–67	2–2	Pete Mathews Coliseum (381); Jacksonville, AL
11/22/2016*; 8:00 pm		at Alabama	L 48–66	2–3	Coleman Coliseum (933); Tuscaloosa, AL
11/26/2016*; 2:00 pm		at IUPUI	L 57–83	2–4	The Jungle (302); Indianapolis, IN
11/29/2016*; 11:00 am		Mercer	L 56–77	2–5	Hanner Fieldhouse (772); Statesboro, GA
12/01/2016*; 6:00 pm		at Savannah State	W 50–45	3–5	Tiger Arena (2,602); Savannah, GA
12/12/2016*; 7:00 pm		at Charleston Southern	L 54–55	3–6	CSU Field House (105); Charleston, SC
12/17/2016*; 2:00 pm		Central Florida	L 54–74	3–7	Hanner Fieldhouse (141); Statesboro, GA
12/22/2016*; 1:30 pm		South Carolina State	W 74–58	4–7	Hanner Fieldhouse (152); Statesboro, GA
Sun Belt regular season
12/31/2016; 10:00 am		Georgia State; Rivalry	L 54–58	4–8 (0–1)	Hanner Fieldhouse (2,356); Statesboro, GA
01/05/2017; 7:00 pm, ESPN3		South Alabama	L 46–55	4–9 (0–2)	Hanner Fieldhouse; Statesboro, GA
01/07/2017; 2:00 pm		Troy	L 86–89	4–10 (0–3)	Hanner Fieldhouse (344); Statesboro, GA
01/12/2017; 7:00 pm		at Louisiana–Monroe	W 65–44	5–10 (1–3)	Fant–Ewing Coliseum (505); Monroe, LA
01/14/2017; 6:00 pm		at Louisiana–Lafayette	L 52–79	5–11 (1–4)	Cajundome (886); Lafayette, LA
01/19/2017; 6:00 pm, ESPN3		Coastal Carolina	W 78–70	6–11 (2–4)	Hanner Fieldhouse (178); Statesboro, GA
01/21/2017; 2:00 pm		Appalachian State	W 53–50	7–11 (3–4)	Hanner Fieldhouse (355); Statesboro, GA
01/26/2017; 7:00 pm, ESPN3		at Troy	L 67–77	7–12 (3–5)	Trojan Arena (594); Troy, AL
01/28/2017; 5:00 pm, ESPN3		at South Alabama	W 53–45	8–12 (4–5)	Mitchell Center (2,439); Mobile, AL
02/02/2017; 7:00 pm		Louisiana–Lafayette	W 63–60	9–12 (5–5)	Hanner Fieldhouse (408); Statesboro, GA
02/04/2017; 2:00 pm, ESPN3		Louisiana–Monroe	W 76–65	10–12 (6–5)	Hanner Fieldhouse (491); Statesboro, GA
02/09/2017; 7:00 pm, ESPN3		at Appalachian State	L 48–73	10–13 (6–6)	Holmes Center (175); Boone, NC
02/11/2017; 2:00 pm		at Coastal Carolina	W 65–62	11–13 (7–6)	HTC Center (400); Conway, SC
02/16/2017; 7:00 pm		Texas–Arlington	L 60–69	11–14 (7–7)	Hanner Fieldhouse (268); Statesboro, GA
02/18/2017; 2:00 pm		Appalachian State	W 71–69	12–14 (8–7)	Hanner Fieldhouse (702); Statesboro, GA
02/23/2017; 7:30 pm		at Little Rock	L 41–57	12–15 (8–8)	Jack Stephens Center (1,129); Little Rock, AR
02/25/2017; 4:00 pm, ESPN3		at Arkansas State	W 84–76	13–15 (9–8)	Convocation Center (718); Jonesboro, AR
03/04/2016; 12:00 pm, ESPN3		at Georgia State; Rivalry	L 62–63	13–16 (9–9)	GSU Sports Arena (762); Atlanta, GA
Sun Belt Women's Tournament
03/07/2017; 8:30 pm, ESPN3	(6)	vs. (11) Arkansas State; First round	L 50–61	13–17	Lakefront Arena; New Orleans, LA
*Non-conference game. ^{#}Rankings from AP Poll. (#) Tournament seedings in parentheses. All times are in Eastern Time.

== See also ==
- 2016–17 Georgia Southern Eagles men's basketball team
