= 2016–17 Georgia State Panthers women's basketball team =

Intercollegiate basketball season

2016–17 Georgia State Panthers women's basketball
- Conference: Sun Belt Conference
- Record: 12–18 (8–10 Sun Belt)
- Head coach: Sharon Baldwin-Tener (7th season)
- Assistant coaches: Erin Batth; Kelly Mathis; Latricia Trammell
- Home arena: GSU Sports Arena

2016–17 Sun Belt Conference women's basketball standings
	Conf.				Overall
Team	W		L	PCT	W		L	PCT
Little Rock	17	–	1	.944	25	–	8	.758
UT Arlington	14	–	4	.778	22	–	8	.733
Troy †	12	–	6	.667	22	–	10	.688
Louisiana–Lafayette	11	–	7	.611	20	–	11	.645
Texas State	11	–	7	.611	16	–	14	.533
Georgia Southern	9	–	9	.500	13	–	17	.433
Coastal Carolina	8	–	10	.444	13	–	16	.448
Georgia State	8	–	10	.444	12	–	18	.400
Appalachian State	6	–	12	.333	12	–	19	.387
South Alabama	5	–	13	.278	11	–	20	.355
Arkansas State	4	–	14	.222	7	–	25	.219
Louisiana–Monroe	3	–	15	.167	6	–	24	.200
† 2017 Sun Belt tournament winner

The 2016–17 Georgia State Panthers women's basketball team represented Georgia State University in the 2016–17 NCAA Division I women's basketball season. The Panthers, coached by Sharon Baldwin-Tener in her seventh, were a member of the Sun Belt Conference, and played their home games on campus at the GSU Sports Arena. They finished the season 12–18, 8–10 in Sun Belt play to finish in a tie for seventh place. They lost in the first round of the Sun Belt women's tournament to South Alabama.

== Roster ==
2016–17 Georgia State Panthers women's basketball team
Players
Coaches

Pos.	#	Name	Height	Year	Previous school	Hometown
F	0	Alaysia Mitchell	6 ft 0 in (1.83 m)	Sr	Wheeler; Pensacola State	Marietta, GA
F	1	Tiffany Holston	6 ft 1 in (1.85 m)	Sr	Taylor County; Albany State	Butler, GA
F	2	K. K. Williams	5 ft 10 in (1.78 m)	RS So	Blackman	Murfreesboro, TN
G	4	Jaylyn Harrison	5 ft 4 in (1.63 m)	Fr	Colonial	Orlando, FL
G	10	Makeba Ponder	5 ft 8 in (1.73 m)	Jr	Colquitt County	Moultrie, GA
F	11	Astaja Tyghter	5 ft 10 in (1.78 m)	So	Colonial	Orlando, FL
G	13	Jada Lewis	5 ft 7 in (1.7 m)	Fr	McEachern	Powder Springs, GA
F	20	Francesca Minali	6 ft 2 in (1.88 m)	Jr	Northeast CC	Stezzano, Italy
G	21	Kierra Henry	5 ft 9 in (1.75 m)	So	Pope	Marietta, GA
G	23	Madison Newby	5 ft 8 in (1.73 m)	So	Archer	Lawrenceville, GA
F	25	Kennesha Nichols	6 ft 0 in (1.83 m)	Jr	Ensworth	Smyrna, TN
C	30	Shaquanda Miller-McCray	6 ft 3 in (1.91 m)	Fr	Crestwood	Sumter, SC
F/C	32	Haley Gerrin	6 ft 2 in (1.88 m)	Sr	Habersham Central	Clarkesville, GA
G	33	Tattiana Jackson	5 ft 10 in (1.78 m)	RS Sr	Lovett; Chattanooga	Atlanta, GA
C	44	Taleah Williams	6 ft 2 in (1.88 m)	Sr	Suitland	Forestville, MD

Head coach

- Sharon Baldwin-Tener (Georgia)

Assistant coach(es)

- Erin Batth (Clemson)
- Kelly Mathis (Pfeiffer)
- Latricia Trammell (East Central)

Legend

- (C) Team captain
- (S) Suspended
- (I) Ineligible
- (W) Walk-on
- Injured
- Current redshirt

Roster

== Schedule ==
Date time, TV	Rank^{#}	Opponent^{#}	Result	Record	Site (attendance) city, state
Non-conference regular season
November 11*; 5:30 pm		at Morehead State; Donna Murphy Classic	W 68–50	1–0	Ellis Johnson Arena (850); Morehead, KY
November 12*; 6:00 pm		vs. Eastern Michigan; Donna Murphy Classic	L 59–69	1–1	Ellis Johnson Arena (100); Morehead, KY
November 16*; 7:00 pm, ESPN3		Allen	W 96–58	2–1	GSU Sports Arena (375); Atlanta, GA
November 20*; 2:00 pm, ESPN3		UNC Wilmington	L 66–72	2–2	GSU Sports Arena (472); Atlanta, GA
November 22*; 7:00 pm, ESPN3		Kennesaw State	W 62–59	3–2	GSU Sports Arena (465); Atlanta, GA
November 24*; 3:30 pm, SportsNet		vs. Penn State; San Juan Shootout	L 42–69	3–3	Ocean Center; Daytona Beach, FL
November 25*; 5:45 pm, SportsNet		vs. American; San Juan Shootout	W 59–58 ^{OT}	4–3	Ocean Center; Daytona Beach, FL
December 3*; 2:00 pm		at Georgia Tech	L 42–73	4–4	Hank McCamish Pavilion (1,235); Atlanta, GA
December 15*; 11:30 am		at Alabama	L 57–80	4–5	Coleman Coliseum (4,203); Tuscaloosa, AL
December 20*; 1:00 pm, ESPN3		Akron; GSU Holiday Classic	L 66–78	4–6	GSU Sports Arena (333); Atlanta, GA
December 22*; 1:00 pm, ESPN3		Elon; GSU Holiday Classic	L 67–84	4–7	GSU Sports Arena (433); Atlanta, GA
Sun Belt regular season
December 31; 10:00 am		at Georgia Southern; Rivalry	W 58–54	5–7 (1–0)	Hanner Fieldhouse (2,356); Statesboro, GA
January 5; 7:00 pm, ESPN3		Troy	L 69–87	5–8 (1–1)	GSU Sports Arena (367); Atlanta, GA
January 7; 12:00 pm, ESPN3		South Alabama	L 47–77	5–9 (1–2)	GSU Sports Arena (298); Atlanta, GA
January 12; 7:00 pm		at Louisiana–Lafayette	L 65-72	5–10 (1–3)	Cajundome (527); Lafayette, LA
January 14; 2:00 pm		at Louisiana–Monroe	L 63–72	5–11 (1–4)	Fant–Ewing Coliseum; Monroe, LA
January 19; 2:00 pm, ESPN3		Appalachian State	L 63–67	5–12 (1–5)	GSU Sports Arena (400); Atlanta, GA
January 21; 12:00 pm, ESPN3		Coastal Carolina	L 67–73	5–13 (1–6)	GSU Sports Arena (367); Atlanta, GA
January 26; 12:00 pm		at South Alabama	W 55-45	6–13 (2–6)	Mitchell Center (2,473); Mobile, AL
January 28; 3:00 pm		at Troy	W 68–65 (3–6)	7–13 (3–6)	Trojan Arena (713); Troy, AL
February 2; 2:00 pm, ESPN3		Louisiana–Monroe	W 87–35	8–13 (4–6)	GSU Sports Arena (386); Atlanta, GA
February 4; 12:00 pm, ESPN3		Louisiana	L 64–70	8–14 (4–7)	GSU Sports Arena (420); Atlanta, GA
February 9; 7:00 pm		at Coastal Carolina	W 69–48	9–14 (5–7)	HTC Center (331); Conway, SC
February 11; 1:00 pm		at Appalachian State	W 59–55	10–14 (6–7)	Holmes Center (444); Boone, NC
February 16; 7:00 pm, ESPN3		Texas State	L 51–62	10–15 (6–8)	GSU Sports Arena (416); Atlanta, GA
February 18; 12:00 pm, ESPN3		Texas–Arlington	W 64–59	11–15 (7–8)	GSU Sports Arena (526); Atlanta, GA
February 23; 8:00 pm, ESPN3		at Arkansas State	L 57–59	11–16 (7–9)	Convocation Center; Jonesboro, AR
February 25; 5:00 pm		at Little Rock	L 45–52	11–17 (7–10)	Jack Stephens Center; Little Rock, AR
March 4; 12:00 pm, ESPN3		Georgia Southern; Rivalry	W 63–62	12–17 (8–10)	GSU Sports Arena (762); Atlanta, GA
Sun Belt Women's Tournament
March 7; 6:00 pm, ESPN3	(7)	vs. (10) South Alabama; First round	L 44–49	12–18	Lakefront Arena; New Orleans, LA
*Non-conference game. ^{#}Rankings from AP Poll. (#) Tournament seedings in parentheses. All times are in Eastern Time.

== See also ==
- 2016–17 Georgia State Panthers men's basketball team
