= 2016–17 Coastal Carolina Chanticleers women's basketball team =

Intercollegiate basketball season

2016–17 Coastal Carolina Chanticleers women's basketball
- Conference: Sun Belt Conference
- Record: 13–16 (8–10 Sun Belt)
- Head coach: Jaida Williams (4th season)
- Assistant coaches: Heather Kearney; Terry Primm; Talby Justus
- Home arena: HTC Center

2016–17 Sun Belt Conference women's basketball standings
	Conf.				Overall
Team	W		L	PCT	W		L	PCT
Little Rock	17	–	1	.944	25	–	8	.758
UT Arlington	14	–	4	.778	22	–	8	.733
Troy †	12	–	6	.667	22	–	10	.688
Louisiana–Lafayette	11	–	7	.611	20	–	11	.645
Texas State	11	–	7	.611	16	–	14	.533
Georgia Southern	9	–	9	.500	13	–	17	.433
Coastal Carolina	8	–	10	.444	13	–	16	.448
Georgia State	8	–	10	.444	12	–	18	.400
Appalachian State	6	–	12	.333	12	–	19	.387
South Alabama	5	–	13	.278	11	–	20	.355
Arkansas State	4	–	14	.222	7	–	25	.219
Louisiana–Monroe	3	–	15	.167	6	–	24	.200
† 2017 Sun Belt tournament winner

The 2016–17 Coastal Carolina Chanticleers women's basketball team represented Coastal Carolina University in the 2016–17 NCAA Division I women's basketball season. The Chanticleers, led by fourth year head coach Jaida Williams, played their home games at HTC Center and were first year members of the Sun Belt Conference. They finished the season 13–16, 8–10 in Sun Belt play to finish in a tie for seventh place. They lost in the first round of the Sun Belt women's tournament to Appalachian State.

== Roster ==
2016–17 Coastal Carolina Chanticleers women's basketball team
Players
Coaches

Pos.	#	Name	Height	Year	Previous school	Hometown
F	1	Yasmin Miller	6 ft 1 in (1.85 m)	Sr	Northeast CC	Queensland, Australia
G	2	Breelyn Blanding	5 ft 9 in (1.75 m)	So	Ridgeview HS	Columbia, SC
F	4	Derriel Banyard	5 ft 11 in (1.8 m)	Sr	Park Arts & Science HS; State Fair CC	Little Rock, AR
G	10	Jas Adams	5 ft 7 in (1.7 m)	Jr	Ronald W. Reagan HS	Winston-Salem, NC
G	11	Kennedy Archer	5 ft 10 in (1.78 m)	So	Franklin Central HS	Indianapolis, IN
G	14	Ced Gibson	5 ft 7 in (1.7 m)	RS Sr	High Point HS; St. John's	High Point, NC
G	20	Olivia Carlton	5 ft 8 in (1.73 m)	Sr	Penn HS	Granger, IN
G	23	Kaydra Duckett (I) (redshirt)	5 ft 9 in (1.75 m)	Jr	Dreher; South Carolina	Columbia, SC
G	25	Josie Utley	5 ft 9 in (1.75 m)	Jr	Bloomington South HS	Bloomington, IN
C	30	Naheria Hamilton	6 ft 4 in (1.93 m)	Fr	Eastern Wayne HS	Goldsboro, NC
G/F	31	Rachael Gregory	5 ft 11 in (1.8 m)	RS Sr	North Central HS; Buffalo	Indianapolis, IN
G	32	DJ Williams	5 ft 10 in (1.78 m)	Fr	JW North HS	Moreno Valley, CA
G/F	34	Alexis Robinson	5 ft 10 in (1.78 m)	Sr	Hazelwood West HS; Moberly Area CC	St. Louis, MO
F	40	Jamie Williams	6 ft 4 in (1.93 m)	So	Coral Springs Charter	Coral Springs, FL
G	54	Courtney Clasen	5 ft 9 in (1.75 m)	RS Fr	Shoreham-Wading River HS	Shoreham, NY

Head coach

- Jaida Williams (Cal Poly Pomona)

Assistant coach(es)

- Heather Kearney (Slippery Rock)
- Terry Primm (Palm Beach Atlantic)
- Latisha Luckett (Central Michigan)

Legend

- (C) Team captain
- (S) Suspended
- (I) Ineligible
- (W) Walk-on
- Injured
- Current redshirt

Roster

== Schedule ==
Date time, TV	Rank^{#}	Opponent^{#}	Result	Record	Site (attendance) city, state
Non-conference regular season
11/11/2016*; 12:00 pm		at Clemson	L 57–64	0–1	Littlejohn Coliseum (2,242); Clemson, SC
11/15/2016*; 7:00 pm		North Carolina Central	W 66–50	1–1	HTC Center (304); Conway, SC
11/19/2016*; 1:00 pm		at Marshall	L 66–84	1–2	Cam Henderson Center (1,327); Huntington, WV
11/26/2016*; 11:00 am		at IPFW	W 72–57	2–2	Memorial Coliseum (1,789); Fort Wayne, IN
11/30/2016*; 6:00 pm		Catawba	L 58–63	2–3	HTC Center (321); Conway, SC
12/02/2016*; 7:00 pm		Pfeiffer	W 91–49	3–3	HTC Center (267); Conway, SC
12/05/2016*; 6:00 pm		at Wofford	L 62–67	3–4	Benjamin Johnson Arena (167); Spartanburg, SC
12/12/2016*; 7:00 pm		Saint Francis (PA)	L 59–70	3–5	HTC Center (302); Conway, SC
12/16/2016*; 6:00 pm		vs. South Carolina State; CresCom Bank Carolinas Challenge	W 63–54	4–5	Myrtle Beach Convention Center (208); Myrtle Beach, SC
12/20/2016*; 4:00 pm		at College of Charleston	W 79–72	5–5	TD Arena (402); Charleston, SC
Sun Belt regular season
12/29/2016; 8:00 pm		at Texas State	L 62–83	5–6 (0–1)	Strahan Coliseum (1,119); San Marcos, TX
12/31/2016; 3:00 pm		at Texas–Arlington	L 58–60	5–7 (0–2)	College Park Center (1,892); Arlington, TX
01/05/2017; 7:00 pm		Little Rock	L 66–74	5–8 (0–3)	HTC Center (282); Conway, SC
01/07/2017; 1:00 pm		Arkansas State	W 57–55	6–8 (1–3)	HTC Center (295); Conway, SC
01/14/2017; 1:00 pm		Appalachian State	W 60–55	7–8 (2–3)	HTC Center (332); Conway, SC
01/19/2017; 7:00 pm		at Georgia Southern	L 70–78	7–9 (2–4)	Hanner Fieldhouse (178); Statesboro, GA
01/21/2017; 12:00 pm		at Georgia State	W 73–67	8–9 (3–4)	GSU Sports Arena (367); Atlanta, GA
01/26/2017; 7:00 pm		Texas–Arlington	L 41–70	8–10 (3–5)	HTC Center (320); Conway, SC
01/28/2017; 1:00 pm		Texas State	W 64–48	9–10 (4–5)	HTC Center (415); Conway, SC
02/02/2017; 8:00 pm		at Arkansas State	L 52–60	9–11 (4–6)	Convocation Center (619); Jonesboro, AR
02/04/2017; 5:00 pm		at Little Rock	L 47–79	9–12 (4–7)	Jack Stephens Center; Little Rock, AR
02/09/2017; 7:00 pm		Georgia State	L 48–69	9–13 (4–8)	HTC Center (331); Conway, SC
02/11/2017; 1:00 pm		Georgia Southern	L 62–65	9–14 (4–9)	HTC Center (400); Conway, SC
02/16/2017; 8:00 pm		at South Alabama	W 61–45	10–14 (5–9)	Mitchell Center (267); Mobile, AL
02/18/2017; 3:00 pm		at Troy	L 66–78	10–15 (5–10)	Trojan Arena (497); Troy, AL
02/23/2017; 7:00 pm		Louisiana–Monroe	W 75–48	11–15 (6–10)	HTC Center (327); Conway, SC
02/25/2017; 1:00 pm		Louisiana–Lafayette	W 71–68	12–15 (7–10)	HTC Center (323); Conway, SC
03/04/2017; 1:00 pm		at Appalachian State	W 56–53	13–15 (8–10)	Holmes Center (469); Boone, NC
Sun Belt Women's Tournament
03/07/2017; 12:00 pm, ESPN3	(8)	vs. (9) Appalachian State; First round	L 58–79	13–16	Lakefront Arena; New Orleans, LA
*Non-conference game. ^{#}Rankings from AP Poll. (#) Tournament seedings in parentheses. All times are in Eastern Time.

== See also ==
2016–17 Coastal Carolina Chanticleers men's basketball team
