= 2016–17 UT Arlington Mavericks women's basketball team =

Intercollegiate basketball season

2016–17 UT Arlington Mavericks women's basketball

SHU Thanksgiving Classic champions

WNIT, First Round
- Conference: Sun Belt Conference
- Record: 22–9 (14–4 Sun Belt)
- Head coach: Krista Gerlich (4th season)
- Assistant coaches: Kristin Cole; Ashley Crawford; Talby Justus
- Home arena: College Park Center

2016–17 Sun Belt Conference women's basketball standings
	Conf.				Overall
Team	W		L	PCT	W		L	PCT
Little Rock	17	–	1	.944	25	–	8	.758
UT Arlington	14	–	4	.778	22	–	8	.733
Troy †	12	–	6	.667	22	–	10	.688
Louisiana–Lafayette	11	–	7	.611	20	–	11	.645
Texas State	11	–	7	.611	16	–	14	.533
Georgia Southern	9	–	9	.500	13	–	17	.433
Coastal Carolina	8	–	10	.444	13	–	16	.448
Georgia State	8	–	10	.444	12	–	18	.400
Appalachian State	6	–	12	.333	12	–	19	.387
South Alabama	5	–	13	.278	11	–	20	.355
Arkansas State	4	–	14	.222	7	–	25	.219
Louisiana–Monroe	3	–	15	.167	6	–	24	.200
† 2017 Sun Belt tournament winner

The 2016–17 UT Arlington Mavericks women's basketball team represented the University of Texas at Arlington in the 2016–17 NCAA Division I women's basketball season. The Mavericks, led by fourth year head coach Krista Gerlich, played their home games at the College Park Center and were members of the Sun Belt Conference. They finished the season 22–9, 14–4 in Sun Belt play to finish in second place. They advanced to the semifinals of the Sun Belt women's tournament where they lost to Troy. They were invited to the WNIT where they lost to Tulane in the first round.

== Roster ==
2016–17 Texas–Arlington Mavericks women's basketball team
Players
Coaches

Pos.	#	Name	Height	Year	Previous school	Hometown
G	0	Cierra Johnson	5 ft 9 in (1.75 m)	Jr	L D Bell	Bedford, TX
G	2	Lauren Billie	5 ft 6 in (1.68 m)	So	East Central	Tulsa, OK
G	3	Crystal Allen	5 ft 9 in (1.75 m)	RS So	Trimble Tech; Seattle	Fort Worth, TX
G	4	Breck Clark	5 ft 10 in (1.78 m)	Sr	Dale; NOC-Enid	Shawnee, OK
G	5	Miranda LeJune	5 ft 6 in (1.68 m)	Jr	Pearland; San Jacinto College-North	Pearland, TX
G	11	Shelby Richards	5 ft 8 in (1.73 m)	Jr	Riverton; Odessa JC	South Jordan, UT
G	12	Brooke Alexander (I) (redshirt)	6 ft 0 in (1.83 m)	So	Prestonwood Christian Academy; Liberty	Frisco, TX
F	13	Greta Kairyte	6 ft 3 in (1.91 m)	Jr	Palangos Senoji Gimnazija; Weatherford	Palanga, Lithuania
G	14	Ericka Mattingly	5 ft 8 in (1.73 m)	Fr	Wichita South	Wichita, KS
G	23	Christina Devers	5 ft 6 in (1.68 m)	Jr	Conners State	Wichita, KS
G	24	Aysia Evans	5 ft 6 in (1.68 m)	Fr	Broken Arrow	Tulsa, OK
F	25	Allyson Te'o	6 ft 1 in (1.85 m)	Sr	Fossil Ridge	Fort Worth, TX
F	33	Kelsey Johnson (redshirt)	6 ft 3 in (1.91 m)	Fr	Washington	Washington, OK
F	44	Rebekah Van Dijk	6 ft 5 in (1.96 m)	Jr	Nazareth	Nazareth, TX

Head coach

- Krista Gerlich (Texas Tech)

Assistant coach(es)

- Kristin Cole (Notre Dame)
- Ashley Crawford (Lamar)
- Talby Justus (Tabor)

Legend

- (C) Team captain
- (S) Suspended
- (I) Ineligible
- (W) Walk-on
- Injured
- Current redshirt

Roster

== Schedule ==
Date time, TV	Rank^{#}	Opponent^{#}	Result	Record	Site (attendance) city, state
Non-conference regular season
11/13/2016*; 2:00 pm		UTSA	W 75–54	1–0	College Park Center (592); Arlington, TX
11/16/2016*; 5:30 pm, FCS		at WKU	W 71–68	2–0	E. A. Diddle Arena (1,712); Bowling Green, KY
11/20/2016*; 5:00 pm		Wichita State	W 74–70	3–0	College Park Center (525); Arlington, TX
11/26/2016*; 11:00 am		vs. San Diego State; SHU Thanksgiving Classic semifinals	W 64–58	4–0	Walsh Gymnasium (311); South Orange, NJ
11/27/2016*; 1:30 pm		at Seton Hall; SHU Thanksgiving Classic championship	W 86–61	5–0	Walsh Gymnasium (656); South Orange, NJ
12/03/2016*; 2:00 pm		Stephen F. Austin	L 60–65	5–1	College Park Center (547); Arlington, TX
12/07/2016*; 7:00 pm, FCS Pacific		at Kansas State	L 49–62	5–2	Bramlage Coliseum (4,050); Manhattan, KS
12/11/2016*; 5:00 pm		Eastern New Mexico	W 65–48	6–2	College Park Center (419); Arlington, TX
12/11/2016*; 5:00 pm		Texas A&M–Commerce	W 80–50	7–2	College Park Center (575); Arlington, TX
12/22/2016*; 2:00 pm		at Texas Tech	L 60–79	7–3	United Supermarkets Arena (4,794); Lubbock, TX
Sun Belt regular season
12/29/2016; 7:00 pm		Appalachian State	W 74–63	8–3 (1–0)	College Park Center (591); Arlington, TX
12/31/2016; 2:00 pm		Coastal Carolina	W 60–58	9–3 (2–0)	College Park Center (1,892); Arlington, TX
01/07/2017; 2:00 pm, SPEC		at Texas State	W 61–39	10–3 (3–0)	Strahan Coliseum (1,667); San Marcos, TX
01/12/2017; 7:05 pm		at South Alabama	W 73–49	11–3 (4–0)	Mitchell Center (356); Mobile, AL
01/14/2017; 2:00 pm, ESPN3		at Troy	L 68–85	11–4 (4–1)	Trojan Arena (867); Troy, AL
01/19/2017; 7:00 pm		Louisiana–Lafayette	W 79–66	12–4 (5–1)	College Park Center (554); Arlington, TX
01/21/2017; 2:00 pm, ESPN3		Louisiana–Monroe	W 93–59	13–4 (6–1)	College Park Center (2,659); Arlington, TX
01/26/2016; 6:00 pm		at Coastal Carolina	W 70–41	14–4 (7–1)	HTC Center (320); Conway, SC
01/28/2017; 12:00 pm		at Appalachian State	W 73–62	15–4 (8–1)	Holmes Center (477); Boone, NC
02/04/2017; 2:00 pm, SPEC		Texas State	L 69–75	15–5 (8–2)	College Park Center (1,218); Arlington, TX
02/09/2017; 11:30 am		Little Rock	L 49–58	15–6 (8–3)	College Park Center (5,011); Arlington, TX
02/11/2017; 2:00 pm		Arkansas State	W 69–58	16–6 (9–3)	College Park Center; Arlington, TX
02/16/2017; 6:00 pm		at Georgia Southern	W 69–60	17–6 (10–3)	Hanner Fieldhouse (268); Statesboro, GA
02/18/2017; 11:00 am, ESPN3		at Georgia State	L 59–64	17–7 (10–4)	GSU Sports Arena (526); Atlanta, GA
02/23/2017; 7:00 pm		Troy	W 78–72	18–7 (11–4)	College Park Center (728); Arlington, TX
02/25/2017; 2:00 pm		South Alabama	W 53–41	19–7 (12–4)	College Park Center (2,878); Arlington, TX
03/02/2017; 5:15 pm		at Louisiana–Monroe	W 83–47	20–7 (13–4)	Fant–Ewing Coliseum (1,604); Monroe, LA
03/04/2017; 5:00 pm		at Louisiana–Lafayette	W 79–76	21–7 (14–4)	Cajundome (1,284); Lafayette, LA
Sun Belt Women's Tournament
03/09/2017; 5:00 pm, ESPN3	(2)	vs. (10) South Alabama; Quarterfinals	W 65–53	22–7	Lakefront Arena; New Orleans, LA
03/11/2017; 7:30 pm, ESPN3	(2)	vs. (3) Troy; Semifinals	L 59–88	22–8	Lakefront Arena (1,027); New Orleans, LA
Women's National Invitation Tournament
03/16/2017*; 7:00 pm		at Tulane; First Round	L 53–62	22–9	Devlin Fieldhouse (717); New Orleans, LA
*Non-conference game. ^{#}Rankings from AP Poll. (#) Tournament seedings in parentheses. All times are in Central Time.

== See also ==
- 2016–17 Texas–Arlington Mavericks men's basketball team
