= 2016–17 Little Rock Trojans women's basketball team =

Intercollegiate basketball season

2016–17 Little Rock Trojans women's basketball
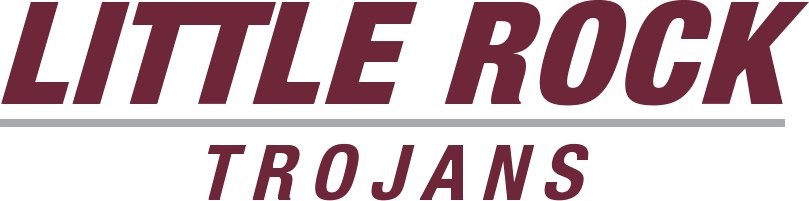

Sun Belt regular season champions

WNIT, Second Round
- Conference: Sun Belt Conference
- Record: 25–9 (17–1 Sun Belt)
- Head coach: Joe Foley (14th season)
- Assistant coaches: Robert Dallimore; Alicia Cash; Steve Wiedower
- Home arena: Jack Stephens Center

2016–17 Sun Belt Conference women's basketball standings
| | Conf. | | | | Overall |
| Team | W | | L | PCT | W | | L | PCT |
|---|---|---|---|---|---|---|---|---|
| Little Rock | 17 | – | 1 | .944 | 25 | – | 8 | .758 |
| UT Arlington | 14 | – | 4 | .778 | 22 | – | 8 | .733 |
| Troy † | 12 | – | 6 | .667 | 22 | – | 10 | .688 |
| Louisiana–Lafayette | 11 | – | 7 | .611 | 20 | – | 11 | .645 |
| Texas State | 11 | – | 7 | .611 | 16 | – | 14 | .533 |
| Georgia Southern | 9 | – | 9 | .500 | 13 | – | 17 | .433 |
| Coastal Carolina | 8 | – | 10 | .444 | 13 | – | 16 | .448 |
| Georgia State | 8 | – | 10 | .444 | 12 | – | 18 | .400 |
| Appalachian State | 6 | – | 12 | .333 | 12 | – | 19 | .387 |
| South Alabama | 5 | – | 13 | .278 | 11 | – | 20 | .355 |
| Arkansas State | 4 | – | 14 | .222 | 7 | – | 25 | .219 |
| Louisiana–Monroe | 3 | – | 15 | .167 | 6 | – | 24 | .200 |
† 2017 Sun Belt tournament winner

The 2016–17 Little Rock Trojans women's basketball team represented the University of Arkansas at Little Rock during the 2016–17 NCAA Division I women's basketball season. The Trojans, led by fourteenth year head coach Joe Foley, played their home games at the Jack Stephens Center and were members of the Sun Belt Conference. They finished the season 25–9, 17–1 in Sun Belt play to win the Sun Belt regular season title. They advanced to the semifinals of the Sun Belt women's tournament, where they lost to Louisiana–Lafayette. They received an automatic bid to the WNIT, where they defeated Southern Miss in the first round before losing to Alabama in the second round.

== Roster ==
2016–17 Little Rock Trojans women's basketball team
Players
Coaches

| Pos. | # | Name | Height | Year | Previous school | Hometown |
|---|---|---|---|---|---|---|
| F | 00 | Ronjanae DeGray | 6 ft 0 in (1.83 m) | So | Mount Juliet HS | Odessa, TX |
| G | 2 | Monique Townson | 5 ft 6 in (1.68 m) | So | Staley HS | Kansas City, MO |
| G | 4 | Kira Shepard | 5 ft 7 in (1.7 m) | So | Northside HS | Fort Smith, AR |
| F | 5 | Carolee Dillard | 6 ft 2 in (1.88 m) | RS Sr | Midwest City HS | Midwest City, OK |
| G | 10 | Destinee Pointer | 5 ft 7 in (1.7 m) | Fr | Waxahachie HS | Waxachachie, TX |
| G | 11 | Alex Murray | 5 ft 11 in (1.8 m) | Fr | Bearden HS | Pearcy, AR |
| G | 12 | Sydney Chastain | 5 ft 7 in (1.7 m) | Fr | Westmoore HS | Oklahoma City, OK |
| G | 13 | Sharde' Collins | 5 ft 9 in (1.75 m) | Sr | Liberty-Eylau HS | Texarkana, TX |
| G | 15 | Kiara Scott | 5 ft 11 in (1.8 m) | So | A. J. Ellender HS | Houma, LA |
| G | 15 | Kyra Scott | 5 ft 11 in (1.8 m) | Fr | North Little Rock HS | Little Rock, AR |
| G | 24 | Emily Lytle | 5 ft 11 in (1.8 m) | Fr | Evangelical Christian School | Memphis, TN |
| F | 25 | Anna Hurlburt | 6 ft 1 in (1.85 m) | Fr | Southlake Carroll HS | Southlake, TX |
| G/F | 30 | Raeyana DeGray | 5 ft 11 in (1.8 m) | So | Mount Juliet HS | Odessa, TX |
| F | 33 | Keanna Keys | 6 ft 1 in (1.85 m) | Sr | Sumrall HS | Sumrall, MS |
| F | 40 | Kaitlyn Pratt | 6 ft 1 in (1.85 m) | Sr | McDonogh 35 College Preparatory HS | New Orleans, LA |

Head coach

- Joe Foley (Central Arkansas)

Assistant coach(es)

- Robert Dallimore (LSU)
- Alicia Cash (Little Rock)
- Steve Wiedower (Arkansas State)

Legend

- (C) Team captain
- (S) Suspended
- (I) Ineligible
- (W) Walk-on
- Injured
- Current redshirt

Roster

== Schedule ==
| Date time, TV | Rank^{#} | Opponent^{#} | Result | Record | Site (attendance) city, state |
Non-conference regular season
| 11/11/2016*; 6:30 pm | | North Texas; Preseason WNIT First Round | W 55–44 | 1–0 | Jack Stephens Center (1,725); Little Rock, AR |
| 11/13/2016*; 1:00 pm, ESPN3 | | at Green Bay; Preseason WNIT Quarterfinals | L 31–57 | 1–1 | Kress Events Center (1,724); Green Bay, WI |
| 11/16/2016*; 7:00 pm | | at No. 16 Oklahoma | L 58–68 | 1–2 | Lloyd Noble Center (3,084); Norman, OK |
| 11/19/2016*; 11:00 am | | at Fordham; Preseason WNIT consolation round | L 43–65 | 1–3 | Rose Hill Gymnasium (1,473); Bronx, NY |
| 11/23/2016*; 6:30 pm | | Texas A&M | L 37–55 | 1–4 | Jack Stephens Center (1,633); Little Rock, AR |
| 11/26/2016*; 3:00 pm | | Saint Louis | W 56–43 | 2–4 | Jack Stephens Center (1,132); Little Rock, AR |
| 11/28/2016*; 7:05 pm, ESPN3 | | at Missouri State | W 58–47 | 3–4 | JQH Arena (3,133); Springfield, MO |
| 12/01/2016*; 6:30 pm | | Oral Roberts | W 56–50 | 4–4 | Jack Stephens Center (1,038); Little Rock, AR |
| 12/04/2016*; 2:00 pm | | at Memphis | W 54–44 | 5–4 | Elma Roane Fieldhouse (313); Memphis, TN |
| 12/13/2016*; 6:30 pm | | No. 5 Mississippi State | L 44–58 | 5–5 | Jack Stephens Center (1,534); Little Rock, AR |
| 12/18/2016*; 2:00 pm | | at Tulsa | W 63–58 | 6–5 | Reynolds Center (191); Tulsa, OK |
| 12/21/2016*; 7:00 pm | | at LSU | L 49–69 | 6–6 | Maravich Center (1,820); Baton Rouge, LA |
Sun Belt Conference regular season
| 12/29/2016; 6:30 pm | | Louisiana–Lafayette | W 64–60 | 7–6 (1–0) | Jack Stephens Center (828); Little Rock, AR |
| 12/31/2016; 1:00 pm | | Louisiana–Monroe | W 78–34 | 8–6 (2–0) | Jack Stephens Center (2,287); Little Rock, AR |
| 01/05/2017; 6:00 pm | | at Coastal Carolina | W 74–66 | 9–6 (3–0) | HTC Center (282); Conway, SC |
| 01/07/2017; 12:00 pm | | at Appalachian State | W 77–69 | 10–6 (4–0) | Holmes Center (225); Boone, NC |
| 01/14/2017; 4:00 pm | | Arkansas State | W 73–59 | 11–6 (5–0) | Jack Stephens Center; Little Rock, AR |
| 01/19/2017; 6:30 pm | | Troy | W 77–74 | 12–6 (6–0) | Jack Stephens Center (1,068); Little Rock, AR |
| 01/21/2017; 4:00 pm | | South Alabama | W 71–54 | 13–6 (7–0) | Jack Stephens Center; Little Rock, AR |
| 01/26/2017; 6:00 pm | | at Louisiana–Monroe | W 92–47 | 14–6 (8–0) | Fant–Ewing Coliseum (723); Monroe, LA |
| 01/28/2017; 5:00 pm | | at Louisiana–Lafayette | W 82–64 | 15–6 (9–0) | Cajundome (711); Lafayette, LA |
| 02/02/2017; 6:30 pm | | Appalachian State | W 67–55 | 16–6 (10–0) | Jack Stephens Center (1,048); Little Rock, AR |
| 02/04/2017; 4:00 pm | | Coastal Carolina | W 79–47 | 17–6 (11–0) | Jack Stephens Center; Little Rock, AR |
| 02/09/2017; 11:30 am | | at Texas–Arlington | W 58–49 | 18–6 (12–0) | College Park Center (5,011); Arlington, TX |
| 02/11/2017; 2:00 pm | | at Texas State | L 47–64 | 18–7 (12–1) | Strahan Coliseum (2,435); San Marcos, TX |
| 02/17/2017; 5:30 pm, ESPN3 | | at Arkansas State | W 60–35 | 19–7 (13–1) | Convocation Center; Jonesboro, AR |
| 02/23/2017; 6:30 pm | | Georgia Southern | W 57–41 | 20–7 (14–1) | Jack Stephens Center (1,129); Little Rock, AR |
| 02/25/2017; 4:00 pm | | Georgia State | W 52–45 | 21–7 (15–1) | Jack Stephens Center; Little Rock, AR |
| 03/02/2017; 5:00 pm | | at South Alabama | W 50–44 | 22–7 (16–1) | Mitchell Center (1,628); Mobile, AL |
| 03/04/2017; 2:00 pm | | at Troy | W 74–63 | 23–7 (17–1) | Trojan Arena (837); Troy, AL |
Sun Belt Women's Tournament
| 03/09/2017; 11:00 am, ESPN3 | (1) | vs. (9) Appalachian State; Quarterfinals | W 69–53 | 24–7 | Lakefront Arena; New Orleans, LA |
| 03/11/2017; 5:00 pm, ESPN3 | (1) | vs. (5) Louisiana–Lafayette; Semifinals | L 71–79 | 24–8 | Lakefront Arena; New Orleans, LA |
WNIT
| 03/15/2017*; 6:00 pm | | at Southern Miss; First Round | W 72–62 | 25–8 | Reed Green Coliseum (987); Hattiesburg, MS |
| 03/19/2017*; 2:00 pm | | at Alabama; Second Round | L 53–55 | 25–9 | Coleman Coliseum (495); Tuscaloosa, AL |
*Non-conference game. ^{#}Rankings from AP Poll. (#) Tournament seedings in parentheses. All times are in Central Time.

== Rankings ==
Ranking movement Legend: ██ Increase in ranking. ██ Decrease in ranking. NR = Not ranked. RV = Received votes.
| Poll | Pre- Season | Week 2 | Week 3 | Week 4 | Week 5 | Week 6 | Week 7 | Week 8 | Week 9 | Week 10 | Week 11 | Week 12 | Week 13 | Week 14 | Week 15 | Week 16 | Week 17 | Week 18 | Week 19 | Final |
|---|---|---|---|---|---|---|---|---|---|---|---|---|---|---|---|---|---|---|---|---|
| AP | NR | NR | NR | NR | NR | NR | NR | NR | NR | NR | NR | NR | NR | NR | NR | NR | NR | | | N/A |
| Coaches | NR | NR | NR | NR | NR | NR | NR | NR | NR | NR | NR | NR | RV | RV | NR | RV | RV | | | |

== See also ==
- 2016–17 Little Rock Trojans men's basketball team
