= 2016–17 Louisiana–Monroe Warhawks women's basketball team =

American college basketball season

2016–17 Louisiana–Monroe Warhawks women's basketball
- Conference: Sun Belt Conference
- Record: 6–24 (3–15 Sun Belt)
- Head coach: Jeff Dow (3rd season)
- Assistant coaches: Eun Jung Ok; Amber Cunningham; David Saur
- Home arena: Fant–Ewing Coliseum

2016–17 Sun Belt Conference women's basketball standings
	Conf.				Overall
Team	W		L	PCT	W		L	PCT
Little Rock	17	–	1	.944	25	–	8	.758
UT Arlington	14	–	4	.778	22	–	8	.733
Troy †	12	–	6	.667	22	–	10	.688
Louisiana–Lafayette	11	–	7	.611	20	–	11	.645
Texas State	11	–	7	.611	16	–	14	.533
Georgia Southern	9	–	9	.500	13	–	17	.433
Coastal Carolina	8	–	10	.444	13	–	16	.448
Georgia State	8	–	10	.444	12	–	18	.400
Appalachian State	6	–	12	.333	12	–	19	.387
South Alabama	5	–	13	.278	11	–	20	.355
Arkansas State	4	–	14	.222	7	–	25	.219
Louisiana–Monroe	3	–	15	.167	6	–	24	.200
† 2017 Sun Belt Tournament winner As of March 15, 2017; Rankings from AP poll

The 2016–17 Louisiana–Monroe women's basketball team represented University of Louisiana at Monroe in the 2016–17 NCAA Division I women's basketball season. The Warhawks, led by third year head coach Jeff Dow, played their home games at Fant–Ewing Coliseum and were members of the Sun Belt Conference. They finished the season 6–24, 3–15 in Sun Belt play to finish in last place. They lost in the first round of the Sun Belt women's tournament to Louisiana–Lafayette.

== Roster ==
2016–17 Louisiana–Monroe Warhawks women's basketball team
Players
Coaches

Pos.	#	Name	Height	Year	Previous school	Hometown
G	1	Alexis Collins	5 ft 6 in (1.68 m)	Jr	Forest HS; Co-Lin CC	Jackson, MS
G	4	Journee Beard	5 ft 6 in (1.68 m)	Sr	St. Michael HS	Baton Rouge, LA
G	10	Lauren Marker	5 ft 6 in (1.68 m)	So	Ovey Comeaux HS	Lafayette, LA
G	11	Destini Lunsford	5 ft 7 in (1.7 m)	Fr	Corsicana HS	Corsicana, TX
G	14	Andreanna Jackson	5 ft 8 in (1.73 m)	Sr	Rayville HS; Bossier Parish CC	Rayville, LA
F	20	Logan Oesteich	6 ft 0 in (1.83 m)	Fr	Bismarck HS	Arkadelphia, AR
G	23	Carissa Moody	5 ft 10 in (1.78 m)	Fr	Plano Senior HS	Plano, TX
G	24	Tanisha Briggs	5 ft 7 in (1.7 m)	Fr	Huntington HS	Shreveport, LA
F	25	Stephanie Ratliff	6 ft 3 in (1.91 m)	Sr	Dr. Phillips HS; Daytona State	Orlando, FL
G/F	32	Jessica Harris (I) (redshirt)	5 ft 11 in (1.8 m)	Jr	Thomas Edison HS; Mount St. Mary's	Woodbridge, VA
F	34	Gabriella Cortez	5 ft 11 in (1.8 m)	Jr	Natchitoches Central; Southwest CC	Natchitoches, LA
F	35	London Archer	6 ft 1 in (1.85 m)	Fr	Putnam City North	Oklahoma City, OK
F	41	Dani Anderson	6 ft 0 in (1.83 m)	RS So	Prairie View Academy	Oak Grove, LA

Head coach

- Jeff Dow (Oregon)

Assistant coach(es)

- Eun Jung Ok (Louisiana–Monroe)
- Amber Cunningham (Rice)
- David Saur (Thiel)

Legend

- (C) Team captain
- (S) Suspended
- (I) Ineligible
- (W) Walk-on
- Injured
- Current redshirt

Roster

== Schedule ==
Date time, TV	Rank^{#}	Opponent^{#}	Result	Record	Site (attendance) city, state
Non-conference regular season
11/11/2016*; 11:00 am		Centenary	W 83–39	1–0	Fant–Ewing Coliseum (302); Monroe, LA
11/13/2016*; 2:00 pm		at Arkansas	L 46–92	1–1	Bud Walton Arena (3,156); Fayetteville, AR
11/15/2016*; 6:00 pm		Grambling State	L 54–59	1–2	Fant–Ewing Coliseum (534); Monroe, LA
11/19/2016*; 1:00 pm		at Nicholls State	L 54–73	1–3	Stopher Gym (502); Thibodaux, LA
11/22/2016*; 6:00 pm		LSU–Alexandria	W 73–61	2–3	Fant–Ewing Coliseum (303); Monroe, LA
11/29/2016*; 6:00 pm		Louisiana Tech	L 53–73	2–4	Fant–Ewing Coliseum (503); Monroe, LA
12/04/2016*; 1:00 pm		at Northwestern State	L 65–67	2–5	Prather Coliseum (718); Natchitoches, LA
12/10/2016*; 6:00 pm		at Ole Miss	L 40–97	2–6	The Pavilion at Ole Miss (1,001); Oxford, MS
12/13/2016*; 6:00 pm		McNeese State	L 52–78	2–7	Fant–Ewing Coliseum (562); Monroe, LA
12/18/2016*; 2:00 pm		Rice	L 50–93	2–8	Fant–Ewing Coliseum (512); Monroe, LA
12/21/2016*; 2:00 pm		at Houston Baptist	W 77–65	3–8	Sharp Gymnasium (247); Houston, TX
Sun Belt regular season
12/29/2016; 7:00 pm		at Arkansas State	L 56–71	3–9 (0–1)	Convocation Center (760); Jonesboro, AR
12/31/2016; 1:00 pm		at Little Rock	L 34–78	3–10 (0–2)	Jack Stephens Center (2,287); Little Rock, AR
01/07/2017; 5:00 pm		at Louisiana–Lafayette	L 57–67	3–11 (0–3)	Cajundome (899); Lafayette, LA
01/12/2017; 6:00 pm		Georgia Southern	L 44–65	3–12 (0–4)	Fant–Ewing Coliseum (505); Monroe, LA
01/14/2017; 2:00 pm		Georgia State	W 72–63	4–12 (1–4)	Fant–Ewing Coliseum; Monroe, LA
01/19/2017; 7:00 pm		at Texas State	L 50–63	4–13 (1–5)	Strahan Coliseum (1,251); San Marcos, TX
01/21/2017; 7:00 pm		at Texas–Arlington	L 59–93	4–14 (1–6)	College Park Center (2,659); Arlington, TX
01/26/2017; 6:00 pm		Little Rock	L 47–92	4–15 (1–7)	Fant–Ewing Coliseum (723); Monroe, LA
01/28/2017; 2:00 pm		Arkansas State	W 59–51	5–15 (2–7)	Fant–Ewing Coliseum (2,211); Monroe, LA
02/02/2017; 6:00 pm		at Georgia State	L 35–87	5–16 (2–8)	GSU Sports Arena (386); Atlanta, GA
02/04/2017; 1:00 pm, ESPN3		at Georgia Southern	L 65–76	5–17 (2–9)	Hanner Fieldhouse (491); Statesboro, GA
02/09/2017; 6:00 pm		Troy	L 67–94	5–18 (2–10)	Fant–Ewing Coliseum (617); Monroe, LA
02/11/2017; 2:00 pm		South Alabama	L 44–74	5–19 (2–11)	Fant–Ewing Coliseum (1,421); Monroe, LA
02/18/2017; 2:00 pm		Louisiana–Lafayette	L 59–65	5–20 (2–12)	Fant–Ewing Coliseum (2,451); Monroe, LA
02/23/2017; 6:00 pm		at Coastal Carolina	L 48–75	5–21 (2–13)	HTC Center (327); Conway, SC
02/25/2017; 12:00 pm, ESPN3		at Appalachian State	L 61–79	5–22 (2–14)	Holmes Center (434); Boone, NC
03/02/2017; 5:15 pm		Texas–Arlington	L 47–83	5–23 (2–15)	Fant–Ewing Coliseum (1,604); Monroe, LA
03/04/2017; 12:00 pm		Texas State	W 61–59	6–23 (3–15)	Fant–Ewing Coliseum; Monroe, LA
Sun Belt Women's Tournament
03/07/2017; 1:30 pm, ESPN3	(12)	vs. (5) Louisiana–Lafayette; First round	L 72–79	6–24	Lakefront Arena; New Orleans, LA
*Non-conference game. ^{#}Rankings from AP Poll. (#) Tournament seedings in parentheses. All times are in Eastern Time.

== See also ==
2016–17 Louisiana–Monroe Warhawks men's basketball team
