= 2016–17 Appalachian State Mountaineers women's basketball team =

Intercollegiate basketball season

2016–17 Appalachian State Mountaineers women's basketball
- Conference: Sun Belt Conference
- Record: 13–19 (6–12 Sun Belt)
- Head coach: Angel Elderkin (3rd season)
- Assistant coaches: Emily Roberts; Jessica Jackson; Kate Dempsey
- Home arena: Holmes Center

2016–17 Sun Belt Conference women's basketball standings
	Conf.				Overall
Team	W		L	PCT	W		L	PCT
Little Rock	17	–	1	.944	25	–	8	.758
UT Arlington	14	–	4	.778	22	–	8	.733
Troy †	12	–	6	.667	22	–	10	.688
Louisiana–Lafayette	11	–	7	.611	20	–	11	.645
Texas State	11	–	7	.611	16	–	14	.533
Georgia Southern	9	–	9	.500	13	–	17	.433
Coastal Carolina	8	–	10	.444	13	–	16	.448
Georgia State	8	–	10	.444	12	–	18	.400
Appalachian State	6	–	12	.333	12	–	19	.387
South Alabama	5	–	13	.278	11	–	20	.355
Arkansas State	4	–	14	.222	7	–	25	.219
Louisiana–Monroe	3	–	15	.167	6	–	24	.200
† 2017 Sun Belt tournament winner

The 2016–17 Appalachian State Mountaineers women's basketball team represented Appalachian State University in the 2016–17 NCAA Division I women's basketball season. The Eagles, led by third year head coach Angel Elderkin, played their home games at George M. Holmes Convocation Center and were members of the Sun Belt Conference. They finished the season 13–19, 6–12 in Sun Belt play to finish in ninth place. They advanced to the quarterfinals of the Sun Belt women's tournament where they lost to Little Rock.

== Roster ==
2016–17 Appalachian State Mountaineers women's basketball team
Players
Coaches

Pos.	#	Name	Height	Year	Previous school	Hometown
G	1	Jasmine Ogunjimi	5 ft 7 in (1.7 m)	RS Sr	Whitney Young HS; Hutchinson CC	Chicago, IL
G	2	Qierra Murray	5 ft 8 in (1.73 m)	RS So	Milford Mill Academy; George Mason	Baltimore, MD
G	3	Bria Carter	6 ft 0 in (1.83 m)	So	Spotsylvania	Spotsylvania, VA
G	4	Elizabeth Norregaard	5 ft 5 in (1.65 m)	So	Middleton	Vedbæk, Denmark
G	5	Mikaya Wilson	5 ft 7 in (1.7 m)	Fr	Knightdale	Raleigh, NC
G	10	Joi Jones	5 ft 6 in (1.68 m)	Sr	Duluth	Duluth, GA
G	11	Kaila Craven	5 ft 8 in (1.73 m)	So	Southwestern Randolph	Asheboro, NC
G/F	14	Armani Hampton	5 ft 11 in (1.8 m)	Fr	Atkins	Winston-Salem, NC
G	15	Amber Driver	5 ft 9 in (1.75 m)	RS Jr	Dekaney; Tyler JC	Houston, TX
G/F	20	Katelyn Doub	5 ft 10 in (1.78 m)	Jr	Southwestern Randolph	Asheboro, NC
G	21	Julia Buehler	5 ft 7 in (1.7 m)	So	John T. Hoggard	Wilmington, NC
G	22	Cydni Cole	5 ft 5 in (1.65 m)	RS So	Indian Creek; George Mason	Glen Burnie, MD
F	30	Ashley Bassett-Smith	6 ft 3 in (1.91 m)	RS Sr	Pickerington North; UT Martin	Pickerington, OH
G	32	Brooklyn Allen	5 ft 8 in (1.73 m)	Fr	Pisgah	Canton, NC
G	34	Madi Story	5 ft 10 in (1.78 m)	Jr	Bandys	Maiden, NC
F/C	42	Mia Marshall	6 ft 2 in (1.88 m)	Sr	Parkview	Lilburn, GA
F/C	44	Bayley Plummer	6 ft 2 in (1.88 m)	Fr	East Davidson	Thomasville, NC

Head coach

- Angel Elderkin (Southern Maine)

Assistant coach(es)

- Emily Roberts (UNC Wilmington)
- Jessica Jackson (Western Carolina)
- Kate Dempsey (Wofford)

Legend

- (C) Team captain
- (S) Suspended
- (I) Ineligible
- (W) Walk-on
- Injured
- Current redshirt

Roster

== Schedule ==
Date time, TV	Rank^{#}	Opponent^{#}	Result	Record	Site (attendance) city, state
Exhibition
11/02/2016*; 7:00 pm		Coker	W 77–51		Holmes Center (231); Boone, NC
11/07/2016*; 7:00 pm		Lenoir–Rhyne	W 56–40		Holmes Center (275); Boone, NC
Non-conference regular season
11/11/2016*; 8:30 pm		at No. 21 DePaul; Maggie Dixon Classic semifinals	L 58–99	0–1	McGrath-Phillips Arena (2,055); Chicago, IL
11/12/2016*; 7:00 pm		vs. Gardner–Webb; Maggie Dixon Classic 3rd place game	W 72–67	1–1	McGrath-Phillips Arena; Chicago, IL
11/17/2016*; 7:00 pm, ESPN3		at Liberty	W 66–57	2–1	Vines Center (822); Lynchburgh, VA
11/20/2016*; 5:00 pm		at Richmond	L 46–55	2–2	Robins Center (473); Richmond, VA
11/23/2016*; 7:00 pm, ESPN3		at East Tennessee State	W 71–68	3–2	Freedom Hall Civic Center (712); Johnson City, TN
11/27/2016*; 2:00 pm		College of Charleston	L 62–65	3–3	Holmes Center (206); Boone, NC
11/30/2016*; 12:00 pm		North Carolina A&T	W 71–58	4–3	Holmes Center (519); Boone, NC
12/04/2016*; 2:00 pm, ESPN3		Radford	L 54–57	4–4	Holmes Center (314); Boone, NC
12/11/2016*; 2:00 pm		at Georgia Tech	L 52–81	4–5	Hank McCamish Pavilion (718); Atlanta, GA
12/14/2016*; 7:00 pm		at Tennessee	L 36–86	4–6	Thompson–Boling Arena (7,845); Knoxville, TN
12/21/2016*; 1:00 pm		UNC Asheville	W 81–51	5–6	Holmes Center (189); Boone, NC
Sun Belt regular season
12/29/2016; 8:00 pm		at Texas–Arlington	L 63–74	5–7 (0–1)	College Park Center (591); Arlington, TX
12/31/2016; 3:00 pm		at Texas State	W 66–64	6–7 (1–1)	Strahan Coliseum (1,318); San Marcos, TX
01/05/2017; 7:00 pm		Arkansas State	W 76–50	7–7 (2–1)	Holmes Center (227); Boone, NC
01/07/2017; 1:00 pm		Little Rock	L 69–77	7–8 (2–2)	Holmes Center (225); Boone, NC
01/14/2017; 1:00 pm		at Coastal Carolina	L 55–60	7–9 (2–3)	HTC Center (332); Conway, SC
01/19/2017; 7:00 pm		at Georgia State	W 67–63	8–9 (3–3)	GSU Sports Arena (400); Atlanta, GA
01/21/2017; 2:00 pm		at Georgia Southern	L 50–53	8–10 (3–4)	Hanner Fieldhouse (355); Statesboro, GA
01/26/2016; 7:00 pm, ESPN3		Texas State	L 37–53	8–11 (3–5)	Holmes Center (286); Boone, NC
01/28/2016; 1:00 pm, ESPN3		Texas–Arlington	L 62–73	9–12 (3–6)	Holmes Center (477); Boone, NC
02/02/2017; 7:30 pm		at Little Rock	L 55–67	9–13 (3–7)	Jack Stephens Center (1,048); Little Rock, AR
02/04/2017; 4:00 pm		at Arkansas State	W 81–72 ^{OT}	10–13 (4–7)	Convocation Center (797); Jonesboro, AR
02/09/2017; 7:00 pm, ESPN3		Georgia Southern	W 73–48	11–13 (5–7)	Holmes Center (175); Boone, NC
02/11/2017; 1:00 pm, ESPN3		Georgia State	L 55–59	11–14 (5–8)	Holmes Center (444); Boone, NC
02/16/2017; 7:00 pm		at Troy	L 77–86	11–15 (5–9)	Trojan Arena (578); Troy, AL
02/18/2017; 6:00 pm		at South Alabama	L 41–54	11–16 (5–10)	Mitchell Center; Mobile, AL
02/23/2017; 7:00 pm, ESPN3		Louisiana–Lafayette	L 58–68	11–17 (5–11)	Holmes Center (240); Boone, NC
02/25/2017; 1:00 pm, ESPN3		Louisiana–Monroe	W 79–61	12–17 (6–11)	Holmes Center (434); Boone, NC
03/04/2017; 1:00 pm, ESPN3		Coastal Carolina	L 53–56	12–18 (6–12)	Holmes Center (469); Boone, NC
Sun Belt Women's Tournament
03/07/2017; 12:00 pm, ESPN3	(9)	vs. (8) Coastal Carolina; First round	W 79–58	13–18	Lakefront Arena; New Orleans, LA
03/09/2017; 12:00 pm, ESPN3	(9)	vs. (1) Little Rock; Quarterfinals	L 53–69	13–19	Lakefront Arena; New Orleans, LA
*Non-conference game. ^{#}Rankings from AP Poll. (#) Tournament seedings in parentheses. All times are in Eastern Time.

== See also ==
2016–17 Appalachian State Mountaineers men's basketball team
