= 2016–17 Texas State Bobcats women's basketball team =

Intercollegiate basketball season

2016–17 Texas State Bobcats women's basketball

WBI, first round
- Conference: Sun Belt Conference
- Record: 16–14 (11–7 Sun Belt)
- Head coach: Zenarae Antoine (5th season)
- Assistant coaches: Chandra Dorsey; Addie Lees; Rodney Hill
- Home arena: Strahan Coliseum

2016–17 Sun Belt Conference women's basketball standings
	Conf.				Overall
Team	W		L	PCT	W		L	PCT
Little Rock	17	–	1	.944	25	–	8	.758
UT Arlington	14	–	4	.778	22	–	8	.733
Troy †	12	–	6	.667	22	–	10	.688
Louisiana–Lafayette	11	–	7	.611	20	–	11	.645
Texas State	11	–	7	.611	16	–	14	.533
Georgia Southern	9	–	9	.500	13	–	17	.433
Coastal Carolina	8	–	10	.444	13	–	16	.448
Georgia State	8	–	10	.444	12	–	18	.400
Appalachian State	6	–	12	.333	12	–	19	.387
South Alabama	5	–	13	.278	11	–	20	.355
Arkansas State	4	–	14	.222	7	–	25	.219
Louisiana–Monroe	3	–	15	.167	6	–	24	.200
† 2017 Sun Belt tournament winner

The 2016–17 Texas State Bobcats women's basketball team represented Texas State University in the 2016–17 NCAA Division I women's basketball season. The Bobcats, led by fifth-year head coach Zenarae Antoine, played their home games at Strahan Coliseum and were members of the Sun Belt Conference. They finished the season 16–15, 11–7 in Sun Belt play, to finish in a tie for fourth place. They lost in the quarterfinals of the Sun Belt women's tournament to Louisiana–Lafayette. They were invited to the WBI where they lost to Eastern Washington in the first round.

== Roster ==
2016–17 Texas State Bobcats women's basketball team
Players
Coaches

Pos.	#	Name	Height	Year	Previous school	Hometown
G	2	Toshua Leavitt	5 ft 4 in (1.63 m)	So	Nixa HS	Nixa, MO
G	12	Kiani Lurry	5 ft 8 in (1.73 m)	So	Nova HS	Miami, FL
F	13	Zandra Emanuel	6 ft 0 in (1.83 m)	Jr	C.E. King HS; Coastal Bend College	Houston, TX
G	14	McKinley Bostad	5 ft 8 in (1.73 m)	RS So	Kennedale HS	Kennedale, TX
G/F	15	Ericka May	5 ft 10 in (1.78 m)	Jr	Allen HS	Allen, TX
F	22	Ti'Aira Pitts	6 ft 1 in (1.85 m)	Jr	Cedar Ridge HS	Austin, TX
G	23	Taeler Deer	5 ft 5 in (1.65 m)	Jr	Channelview HS	Houston, TX
G	24	Brooke Holle	5 ft 7 in (1.7 m)	Fr	Westlake HS	Austin, TX
F	25	Whitney Apari	6 ft 0 in (1.83 m)	Jr	Frisco Lone Star HS	Frisco, TX
G	32	Kaitlin Walla	5 ft 9 in (1.75 m)	Jr	Georgetown HS	Georgetown, TX
G	33	Bailey Holle	5 ft 7 in (1.7 m)	Fr	Westlake HS	Austin, TX
G	35	Erin Peoples	6 ft 0 in (1.83 m)	RS Sr	Parkview HS	Little Rock, AR
F	40	Amber Jones	6 ft 0 in (1.83 m)	RS Jr	Ben Davis HS; Florida State College at Jacksonville	Indianapolis, IN
F	55	De'Jionae Calloway	6 ft 0 in (1.83 m)	So	Lee's Summit West HS	Lee's Summit, MO

Head coach

- Zenarae Antoine (Colorado State)

Assistant coach(es)

- Chandra Dorsey (Mississippi)
- Addie Lees (Arkansas–Monticello)
- Rodney Hill (Texas A&M)

Legend

- (C) Team captain
- (S) Suspended
- (I) Ineligible
- (W) Walk-on
- Injured
- Current redshirt

Roster
Last update: September 2, 2024

== Schedule ==
Date time, TV	Rank^{#}	Opponent^{#}	Result	Record	Site (attendance) city, state
Non-conference regular season
November 1, 2016*; 11:30 a.m.		at SMU	L 56–64	0–1	Moody Coliseum (2,617); Dallas, TX
November 5, 2016*; 7:00 p.m.		Incarnate Word	W 67–50	1–1	Strahan Coliseum (1,267); San Marcos, TX
November 8, 2016*; 7:00 p.m.		Texas A&M–Corpus Christi	W 57–50	2–1	Strahan Coliseum (1,175); San Marcos, TX
November 20, 2016*; 2:00 p.m.		Texas Southern	L 53–66	2–2	Strahan Coliseum (1,065); San Marcos, TX
November 23, 2016*; 7:00 p.m.		at Houston	W 61–56	3–2	Hofheinz Pavilion (645); Houston, TX
December 1, 2016*; 7:00 p.m.		at UTSA; I-35 Rivalry	L 47–72	3–3	Convocation Center (345); San Antonio, TX
December 6, 2016*; 7:00 p.m., FSSW+		at No. 3 Baylor	L 24–90	3–4	Ferrell Center (5,362); Waco, TX
December 10, 2016*; 2:00 p.m.		St. Edward's	L 51–65	3–5	Strahan Coliseum (2,117); San Marcos, TX
December 16, 2016*; 7:00 p.m.		at Prairie View A&M	L 60–64	3–6	William Nicks Building (203); Prairie View, TX
December 19, 2016*; 7:00 p.m.		Sam Houston State	W 69–46	4–6	Strahan Coliseum (1,164); San Marcos, TX
December 22, 2016*; 5:00 p.m.		at North Texas	W 59–58	5–6	The Super Pit (725); Denton, TX
Sun Belt regular season
December 29, 2016; 7:00 p.m.		Coastal Carolina	W 83–62	6–6 (1–0)	Strahan Coliseum (1,119); San Marcos, TX
12/31, 2016; 2:00 p.m.		Appalachian State	L 64–66	6–7 (1–1)	Strahan Coliseum (1,318); San Marcos, TX
January 7, 2017; 2:00 p.m., SPCSN		Texas–Arlington	L 39–61	6–8 (1–2)	Strahan Coliseum (1,667); San Marcos, TX
January 12, 2017; 6:00 p.m.		at Troy	L 54–65	6–9 (1–3)	Trojan Arena (634); Troy, AL
January 14, 2017; 1:00 p.m.		at South Alabama	W 57–44	7–9 (2–3)	Mitchell Center (2,076); Mobile, AL
January 19, 2017; 7:00 p.m.		Louisiana–Monroe	W 63–50	8–9 (3–3)	Strahan Coliseum (1,251); San Marcos, TX
January 21, 2017; 2:00 p.m.		Louisiana–Lafayette	W 62–40	9–9 (4–3)	Strahan Coliseum (2,826); San Marcos, TX
January 26, 2017; 6:00 p.m., ESPN3		at Appalachian State	W 53–37	10–9 (5–3)	Holmes Center (286); Boone, NC
January 28, 2017; 12:00 p.m.		at Coastal Carolina	L 48–64	10–10 (5–4)	HTC Center (415); Conway, SC
February 4, 2017; 2:00 p.m., SPEC		at Texas–Arlington	W 75–69	11–10 (6–4)	College Park Center (1,218); Arlington, TX
February 9, 2017; 12:00 p.m.		Arkansas State	W 63–43	12–10 (7–4)	Strahan Coliseum (3,042); San Marcos, TX
February 9, 2017; 2:00 p.m.		Little Rock	W 64–47	13–10 (8–4)	Strahan Coliseum (2,435); San Marcos, TX
February 16, 2017; 6:00 p.m., ESPN3		at Georgia State	W 62–51	14–10 (9–4)	GSU Sports Arena (416); Atlanta, GA
February 18, 2017; 1:00 p.m.		at Georgia Southern	L 69–71	14–11 (9–5)	Hanner Fieldhouse (702); Statesboro, GA
February 23, 2017; 7:00 p.m.		South Alabama	W 55–39	15–11 (10–5)	Strahan Coliseum (1,348); San Marcos, TX
February 25, 2017; 2:00 p.m.		Troy	W 74–72	16–11 (11–5)	Strahan Coliseum (3,057); San Marcos, TX
March 2, 2017; 5:00 p.m.		at Louisiana–Lafayette	L 43–62	16–12 (11–6)	Cajundome (427); Lafayette, LA
March 4, 2017; 12:00 p.m.		at Louisiana–Monroe	L 59–61	16–13 (11–7)	Fant–Ewing Coliseum (1,843); Monroe, LA
Sun Belt women's tournament
March 9, 2017; 1:30 pm, ESPN3	(4)	vs. (5) Louisiana–Lafayette; Quarterfinals	L 64–66	16–14	Lakefront Arena; New Orleans, LA
WBI
March 16, 2017*; 7:00 p.m.		Eastern Washington; First round	L 62–66 ^{OT}	16–15	Strahan Coliseum (1,255); San Marcos, TX
*Non-conference game. ^{#}Rankings from AP poll. (#) Tournament seedings in parentheses. All times are in Eastern.

== See also ==
- 2016–17 Texas State Bobcats men's basketball team
