= 2016–17 Troy Trojans women's basketball team =

Intercollegiate basketball season

2016–17 Troy Trojans women's basketball

Sun Belt Tournament Champions

NCAA Women's Tournament, first round
- Conference: Sun Belt Conference
- Record: 22–11 (12–6 Sun Belt)
- Head coach: Chanda Rigby (5th season)
- Assistant coaches: Jennifer Graf; Courtney Simmons; Neil Harrow
- Home arena: Trojan Arena

2016–17 Sun Belt Conference women's basketball standings
	Conf.				Overall
Team	W		L	PCT	W		L	PCT
Little Rock	17	–	1	.944	25	–	8	.758
UT Arlington	14	–	4	.778	22	–	8	.733
Troy †	12	–	6	.667	22	–	10	.688
Louisiana–Lafayette	11	–	7	.611	20	–	11	.645
Texas State	11	–	7	.611	16	–	14	.533
Georgia Southern	9	–	9	.500	13	–	17	.433
Coastal Carolina	8	–	10	.444	13	–	16	.448
Georgia State	8	–	10	.444	12	–	18	.400
Appalachian State	6	–	12	.333	12	–	19	.387
South Alabama	5	–	13	.278	11	–	20	.355
Arkansas State	4	–	14	.222	7	–	25	.219
Louisiana–Monroe	3	–	15	.167	6	–	24	.200
† 2017 Sun Belt tournament winner

The 2016–17 Troy Trojans women's basketball team represented Troy University during the 2016–17 NCAA Division I women's basketball season. The Trojans, led by fifth year head coach Chanda Rigby, played their home games at Trojan Arena and were members of the Sun Belt Conference. They finished the season 22–11, 12–6 in Sun Belt play to finish in third place. They defeat Arkansas State, Texas–Arlington and Louisiana–Lafayette to become champions of the Sun Belt Tournament to earn an automatic trip to the NCAA women's tournament. They lost in the first round to Mississippi State.

== Roster ==
2016–17 Troy Trojans women's basketball team
Players
Coaches

Pos.	#	Name	Height	Year	Previous school	Hometown
G	1	Kayla Robinson	5 ft 5 in (1.65 m)	Fr	Effingham County HS	Clyo, GA
G	3	Amanda Mendoza	5 ft 3 in (1.6 m)	Jr	Miami Sr. HS; St. Petersburg College	Miami, FL
G	10	Jayla Chills	5 ft 10 in (1.78 m)	Sr	Ripley HS; Itawamba CC	Ripley, MS
G	11	ArJae Saunders	5 ft 7 in (1.7 m)	Sr	H.D. Woodson Sr. HS; Walters State CC	Washington, D.C.
G	12	Harriet Winchester	5 ft 11 in (1.8 m)	Fr	Keith HS	Safrord, AL
G	14	Claresa Banks	5 ft 9 in (1.75 m)	Sr	Forest Hill HS; Copiah-Lincoln CC	Jackson, MS
G	20	Ta'Kierra Gibbs	5 ft 9 in (1.75 m)	Sr	Putnam County HS; Central Georgia Technical College	Eatonton, GA
F	22	Amahni Upshaw	6 ft 1 in (1.85 m)	So	Brantley HS	Brantley, AL
F	23	Kristen Emerson	6 ft 1 in (1.85 m)	Sr	Prattville Christian HS	Prattville, AL
F	24	Jessie Day	6 ft 1 in (1.85 m)	Fr	Niceville HS	Niceville, FL
F	25	Casie Johnson	6 ft 0 in (1.83 m)	Sr	Eagle Point HS; Siskiyous	Eagle Point, OR
C	32	Dajia Williams	6 ft 3 in (1.91 m)	Jr	Gadsden City HS	Gadsden, AL
F	33	Lauren Day	6 ft 1 in (1.85 m)	Sr	Choctawhatchee HS	Niceville, FL
F	34	Caitlyn Ramirez	6 ft 2 in (1.88 m)	Sr	Shawnee HS; Tyler JC	Shawnee, OK
F	40	Amber Rivers	6 ft 2 in (1.88 m)	Fr	Center Point HS	Birmingham, AL
F	44	La'Tia Fils-Amie'	6 ft 1 in (1.85 m)	So	Daleville HS	Daleville, AL

Head coach

- Chanda Rigby (Southeastern Louisiana)

Assistant coach(es)

- Jennifer Graf (Northwestern State)
- Courtney Simmons (Louisville)
- Neil Harrow (East Central)

Legend

- (C) Team captain
- (S) Suspended
- (I) Ineligible
- (W) Walk-on
- Injured
- Current redshirt

Roster

== Schedule ==
Date time, TV	Rank^{#}	Opponent^{#}	Result	Record	Site (attendance) city, state
Exhibition
11/01/2016*; 6:00 pm		Uninassau	L 71–92		Trojan Arena; Troy, AL
Non-conference regular season
11/11/2016*; 6:00 pm		at Auburn	L 52–61	0–1	Auburn Arena (2,336); Auburn, AL
11/16/2016*; 12:00 pm, ESPN3		Belmont	W 91–74	1–1	Troy Arena (876); Troy, AL
11/21/2016*; 6:00 pm		vs. Thomas	W 110–55	2–1	Dothan Civic Center (415); Dothan, AL
11/24/2016*; 5:45 pm		vs. Villanova; San Juan Shootout	W 93–85	3–1	Ocean Center; Dayton Beach, FL
11/25/2016*; 2:30 pm		vs. Loyola–Chicago; San Juan Shootout	W 91–67	4–1	Ocean Center; Dayton Beach, FL
12/04/2016*; 3:00 pm, ESPN3		Alabama State	W 95–66	5–1	Troy Arena (517); Troy, AL
12/10/2016*; 1:00 pm, ESPN3		at Jacksonville	L 70–77	5–2	Swisher Gymnasium (590); Jacksonville, FL
12/14/2016*; 6:00 pm		at Nicholls State	W 100–75	6–2	Stopher Gym (410); Thibodaux, LA
12/18/2016*; 2:00 pm, ESPN3		UAB	L 77–81	6–3	Troy Arena (675); Troy, AL
12/21/2016*; 6:00 pm		at Tennessee	L 84–110	6–4	Thompson–Boling Arena (7,827); Knoxville, TN
12/29/2016*; 6:00 pm		Armstrong State	W 118–72	7–4	Troy Arena (324); Troy, AL
Sun Belt regular season
12/31/2016; 1:00 pm		at South Alabama	W 73–57	8–4 (1–0)	Mitchell Center (317); Mobile, AL
01/05/2017; 6:00 pm, ESPN3		at Georgia State	W 87–69	9–4 (2–0)	GSU Sports Arena (367); Atlanta, GA
01/07/2017; 1:00 pm		at Georgia Southern	W 89–86	10–4 (3–0)	Hanner Fieldhouse (344); Statesboro, GA
01/12/2017; 6:00 pm, ESPN3		Texas State	W 65–54	11–4 (4–0)	Troy Arena (634); Troy, AL
01/14/2017; 2:00 pm, ESPN3		Texas–Arlington	W 85–68	12–4 (5–0)	Troy Arena (867); Troy, AL
01/19/2017; 6:30 pm		at Little Rock	L 74–77	12–5 (5–1)	Jack Stephens Center (1,068); Little Rock, AR
01/21/2017; 3:00 pm		at Arkansas State	W 83–75	13–5 (6–1)	Convocation Center (1,425); Jonesboro, AR
01/26/2017; 6:00 pm, ESPN3		Georgia Southern	W 77–67	14–5 (7–1)	Troy Arena (594); Troy, AL
01/28/2017; 2:00 pm, ESPN3		Georgia State	L 65–68	14–6 (7–2)	Troy Arena (713); Troy, AL
02/04/2017; 2:00 pm, ESPN3		South Alabama	W 75–71	15–6 (8–2)	Troy Arena (1,321); Troy, AL
02/09/2017; 6:00 pm		at Louisiana–Monroe	W 94–67	16–6 (9–2)	Fant–Ewing Coliseum (617); Monroe, LA
02/11/2017; 5:00 pm, ESPN3		at Louisiana–Lafayette	L 72–80	16–7 (9–3)	Cajundome (1,024); Lafayette, LA
02/16/2017; 6:00 pm, ESPN3		Appalachian State	W 86–77	17–7 (10–3)	Troy Arena (578); Troy, AL
02/18/2017; 2:00 pm, ESPN3		Coastal Carolina	W 78–66	18–7 (11–3)	Troy Arena (497); Troy, AL
02/23/2017; 7:00 pm, ESPN3		at Texas–Arlington	L 72–78	18–8 (11–4)	College Park Center (728); Arlington, TX
02/25/2017; 2:00 pm		at Texas State	L 72–74	18–9 (11–5)	Strahan Coliseum (3,057); San Marcos, TX
03/02/2017; 5:00 pm, ESPN3		Arkansas State	W 90–77	19–9 (12–5)	Troy Arena (1,221); Troy, AL
03/04/2017; 2:00 pm, ESPN3		Little Rock	L 63–74	19–10 (12–6)	Troy Arena (837); Troy, AL
Sun Belt Women's Tournament
03/09/2017; 7:30 pm, ESPN3	(3)	vs. (11) Arkansas State; Quarterfinals	W 105–72	20–10	Lakefront Arena (714); New Orleans, LA
03/11/2017; 7:30 pm, ESPN3	(3)	vs. (2) Texas–Arlington; Semifinals	W 88–59	21–10	Lakefront Arena (1,027); New Orleans, LA
03/12/2017; 5:00 pm, ESPN3	(3)	vs. (5) Louisiana–Lafayette; Championship Game	W 78–64	22–10	Lakefront Arena (988); New Orleans, LA
NCAA Women's Tournament
03/17/2017*; 1:30 pm, ESPN2	(15 O)	at (2 O) No. 7 Mississippi State; First Round	L 69–110	22–11	Humphrey Coliseum (5,572); Starkville, MS
*Non-conference game. ^{#}Rankings from AP Poll. (#) Tournament seedings in parentheses. O=Oklahoma City Region. All times are in Central Time.

== See also ==
- 2016–17 Troy Trojans men's basketball team
