= 2017 Sun Belt Conference women's basketball tournament =

- Classification: Division I
- Season: 2016–17
- Teams: 12
- Site: Lakefront Arena; New Orleans, Louisiana
- Champions: Troy (2nd title)
- Winning coach: Chanda Rigby (2nd title)
- MVP: Caitlyn Ramirez (Troy)
- Television: ESPN3

2016–17 Sun Belt Conference women's basketball standings
	Conf.				Overall
Team	W		L	PCT	W		L	PCT
Little Rock	17	–	1	.944	25	–	8	.758
UT Arlington	14	–	4	.778	22	–	8	.733
Troy †	12	–	6	.667	22	–	10	.688
Louisiana–Lafayette	11	–	7	.611	20	–	11	.645
Texas State	11	–	7	.611	16	–	14	.533
Georgia Southern	9	–	9	.500	13	–	17	.433
Coastal Carolina	8	–	10	.444	13	–	16	.448
Georgia State	8	–	10	.444	12	–	18	.400
Appalachian State	6	–	12	.333	12	–	19	.387
South Alabama	5	–	13	.278	11	–	20	.355
Arkansas State	4	–	14	.222	7	–	25	.219
Louisiana–Monroe	3	–	15	.167	6	–	24	.200
† 2017 Sun Belt tournament winner

The 2017 Sun Belt Conference women's basketball tournament is the postseason women's basketball tournament for the Sun Belt Conference beginning on March 7 and ending on March 12, 2017, at the Lakefront Arena in New Orleans.

== Seeds ==
2017 Sun Belt women's basketball tournament seeds and results
Seed	School	Conf.	Over.	Tiebreaker
1	Little Rock	17–1	23–7	
2	Texas Arlington	14–4	21–7	
3	Troy	12–6	19–10	
4	Louisiana Lafayette	11–7	17–10	
5	Texas State	11–7	16–13	
6	Georgia Southern	9-9	13–16	
7	Coastal Carolina	8–10	12–17	1-0 vs. Troy
8	Georgia State	8–10	12–17	1-1 vs. Troy
9	Appalachian State	6–12	11–18	
10	South Alabama	5–13	9–19	
11	Arkansas State	4–14	6-23	
12	LA-Monroe	3–15	6-23	
‡ – Sun Belt Conference regular season champions.

== Schedule ==
Session	Game	Time*	Matchup^{#}	Television	Attendance
First round – Tuesday, March 7
1	1	11:00 am	#8 Coastal Carolina vs #9 Appalachian State	ESPN3	
1	2	1:30 pm	#5 Louisiana-Lafayette vs #12 LA-Monroe	ESPN3	
2	3	5:00 pm	#7 Georgia State vs #10 South Alabama	ESPN3	
2	4	7:30 pm	#6 Georgia Southern vs #11 Arkansas State	ESPN3	
Quarterfinals – Thursday, March 9
3	5	11:00 am	#1 Little Rock vs #9 Appalachian State	ESPN3	
3	6	1:30 pm	#4 Texas State vs #5 Louisiana-Lafayette	ESPN3	
4	7	5:00 pm	#2 Texas Arlington vs #10 South Alabama	ESPN3	714
4	8	7:30 pm	#3 Troy vs #11 Arkansas State	ESPN3	714
Semifinals – Saturday, March 11
5	9	5:00 pm	#1 Little Rock vs #5 Louisiana-Lafayette	ESPN3	1,027
5	10	7:30 pm	#2 Texas Arlington vs #3 Troy	ESPN3	1,027
Championship – Sunday, March 12
6	11	5:00 pm	#5 Louisiana-Lafayette vs. Winner of Game 10	ESPN3	988
*Game times in CT. #-Rankings denote tournament seed

== Bracket ==
First round Tuesday, March 7 ESPN3
8	Coastal Carolina	58
9	Appalachian State	79
5	LA-Lafayette	79
12	LA-Monroe	72
7	Georgia State	44
10	South Alabama	49
6	Georgia Southern	50
11	Arkansas State	61

Quarterfinals; Thursday, March 9 ESPN3
1	Little Rock	69
9	Appalachian State	53
4	Texas State	64
5	Louisiana-Lafayette	66
2	Texas-Arlington	65
10	South Alabama	53
3	Troy	105
11	Arkansas State	72

Semifinals; Saturday, March 11; ESPN3
1	Little Rock	71
5	Louisiana-Lafayette	79
2	Texas Arlington	59
3	Troy	88

Championship Game; Sunday, March 12; ESPN3
5	Louisiana-Lafayette	64
3	Troy	78

All times listed are Central

== See also ==
2017 Sun Belt Conference men's basketball tournament
