= 2016–17 South Alabama Jaguars women's basketball team =

Intercollegiate basketball season

2016–17 South Alabama Jaguars women's basketball
- Conference: Sun Belt Conference
- Record: 11–20 (5–13 Sun Belt)
- Head coach: Terry Fowler (4th season)
- Assistant coaches: Yolisha Jackson; Dan Presel; Mallory Luckett
- Home arena: Mitchell Center

2016–17 Sun Belt Conference women's basketball standings
	Conf.				Overall
Team	W		L	PCT	W		L	PCT
Little Rock	17	–	1	.944	25	–	8	.758
UT Arlington	14	–	4	.778	22	–	8	.733
Troy †	12	–	6	.667	22	–	10	.688
Louisiana–Lafayette	11	–	7	.611	20	–	11	.645
Texas State	11	–	7	.611	16	–	14	.533
Georgia Southern	9	–	9	.500	13	–	17	.433
Coastal Carolina	8	–	10	.444	13	–	16	.448
Georgia State	8	–	10	.444	12	–	18	.400
Appalachian State	6	–	12	.333	12	–	19	.387
South Alabama	5	–	13	.278	11	–	20	.355
Arkansas State	4	–	14	.222	7	–	25	.219
Louisiana–Monroe	3	–	15	.167	6	–	24	.200
† 2017 Sun Belt tournament winner

The 2016–17 South Alabama Jaguars women's basketball team represented the University of South Alabama during the 2016–17 NCAA Division I women's basketball season. The Jaguars, led by fourth year head coach Terry Fowler, played their home games at the Mitchell Center as members of the Sun Belt Conference. They finished the season 11–20, 5–13 in Sun Belt play to finish in tenth place. They advanced to the quarterfinals of the Sun Belt women's tournament where they lost to Texas–Arlington.

== Roster ==
2016–17 South Alabama Jaguars women's basketball team
Players
Coaches

Pos.	#	Name	Height	Year	Previous school	Hometown
G	0	Candice Williams	5 ft 6 in (1.68 m)	RS So	St. Francis HS; James Madison	Alpharetta, GA
G	2	Shaforia Kines	5 ft 7 in (1.7 m)	Fr	Huffman HS	Birmingham, AL
G	3	Colby Davis	5 ft 9 in (1.75 m)	Sr	Wylie HS	Wylie, TX
G	4	Christen Carter	5 ft 10 in (1.78 m)	So	Bolles School	Jacksonville, FL
G	13	Camryn London	5 ft 7 in (1.7 m)	Fr	Shades Valley HS	Birmingham, AL
G	14	Savannah Jones	6 ft 1 in (1.85 m)	Fr	St. Martin HS	Ocean Springs, MS
F	15	LaNeetra Guillory	6 ft 1 in (1.85 m)	Jr	Pearland HS	Pearland, TX
G	23	Alyese Givens	6 ft 1 in (1.85 m)	So	Shades Valley HS	Irondale, AL
F	24	Erin Autio	6 ft 0 in (1.83 m)	RS So	St. Michael-Albertville HS	St. Michael, MN
F	25	Kennedi Centers	6 ft 2 in (1.88 m)	Fr	Samuel Clemens HS	New Braunfels, TX
G	30	Genesis Perrymond	5 ft 8 in (1.73 m)	RS So	Parkview HS	Lilburn, GA
C	34	Chyna Ellis	6 ft 2 in (1.88 m)	Jr	Arlington HS	Cordova, TN
F/C	44	India Hall	6 ft 2 in (1.88 m)	So	Brentwood Academy	Antioch, TN

Head coach

- Terry Fowler (Lane College)

Assistant coach(es)

- Yolisha Jackson (Jacksonville)
- Dan Presel (Spring Hill)
- Mallory Luckett (Murray State)

Legend

- (C) Team captain
- (S) Suspended
- (I) Ineligible
- (W) Walk-on
- Injured
- Current redshirt

Roster

== Schedule ==
Date time, TV	Rank^{#}	Opponent^{#}	Result	Record	Site (attendance) city, state
Exhibition
11/03/2016*; 7:00 pm		Auburn–Montgomery	W 71–44		Mitchell Center (277); Mobile, AL
Non-conference regular season
11/11/2016*; 4:00 pm		vs. No. 20 Florida	L 33–85	0–1	Jacksonville Veterans Memorial Arena (2,003); Jacksonville, FL
11/13/2016*; 1:00 pm		at UCF	L 58–70	0–2	CFE Arena (2,303); Orlando, FL
11/17/2016*; 7:00 pm		Spring Hill	W 38–33	1–2	Mitchell Center (397); Mobile, AL
11/19/2016*; 7:00 pm		at New Orleans	W 65–62	2–2	Lakefront Arena (213); New Orleans, LA
11/25/2016*; 11:00 am		vs. North Florida; JU Thanksgiving Classic	W 62–55	3–2	Swisher Gymnasium (255); Jacksonville, FL
11/26/2016*; 1:00 pm, ESPN3		at Jacksonville; JU Thanksgiving Classic	L 55–62	3–3	Swisher Gymnasium (319); Jacksonville, FL
12/04/2016*; 2:00 pm		Southern Miss	L 48–57	3–4	Mitchell Center (491); Mobile, AL
12/12/2016*; 7:00 pm		Southern	W 55–48	4–4	Mitchell Center (219); Mobile, AL
12/15/2016*; 7:00 pm		William Carey	W 62–39	5–4	Mitchell Center (278); Mobile, AL
12/19/2016*; 5:30 pm		NC State	L 31–74	5–5	Mitchell Center; Mobile, AL
12/21/2016*; 1:00 pm		at UAB	L 41–66	5–6	Bartow Arena (540); Birmingham, AL
Sun Belt regular season
12/31/2016; 1:00 pm		Troy	L 57–73	5–7 (0–1)	Mitchell Center (317); Mobile, AL
01/05/2017; 6:00 pm, ESPN3		at Georgia Southern	W 55–46	6–7 (1–1)	Hanner Fieldhouse; Statesboro, GA
01/07/2017; 11:00 am, ESPN3		at Georgia State	W 77–47	7–7 (2–1)	GSU Sports Arena (298); Atlanta, GA
01/12/2017; 7:00 pm		Texas–Arlington	L 49–73	7–8 (2–2)	Mitchell Center (356); Mobile, AL
01/14/2017; 1:00 pm		Texas State	L 44–57	7–9 (2–3)	Mitchell Center (2,076); Mobile, AL
01/19/2017; 7:00 pm, ESPN3		at Arkansas State	L 53–56	7–10 (2–4)	Convocation Center (747); Jonesboro, AR
01/21/2017; 4:00 pm		at Little Rock	L 54–71	7–11 (2–5)	Jack Stephens Center; Little Rock, AR
01/26/2017; 11:00 am		Georgia State	L 45–55	7–12 (2–6)	Mitchell Center (2,473); Mobile, AL
01/28/2017; 5:00 pm, ESPN3		Georgia Southern	L 45–53	7–13 (2–7)	Mitchell Center (2,439); Mobile, AL
02/04/2017; 2:00 pm, ESPN3		at Troy	L 71–75	7–14 (2–8)	Trojan Arena (1,321); Troy, AL
02/09/2017; 7:00 pm		at Louisiana–Lafayette	L 38–62	7–15 (2–9)	Cajundome (612); Lafayette, LA
02/11/2017; 2:00 pm		at Louisiana–Monroe	W 74–44	8–15 (3–9)	Fant–Ewing Coliseum (1,421); Monroe, LA
02/16/2017; 7:00 pm		Coastal Carolina	L 45–61	8–16 (3–10)	Mitchell Center (267); Mobile, AL
02/18/2017; 5:00 pm		Appalachian State	W 54–41	9–16 (4–10)	Mitchell Center (2,786); Mobile, AL
02/23/2017; 7:00 pm		at Texas State	L 39–55	9–17 (4–11)	Strahan Coliseum (1,348); San Marcos, TX
02/25/2017; 2:00 pm		at Texas–Arlington	L 41–53	9–18 (4–12)	College Park Center; Arlington, TX
03/02/2017; 5:00 pm		Little Rock	L 44–50	9–19 (4–13)	Mitchell Center (1,628); Mobile, AL
03/04/2017; 1:00 pm		Arkansas State	W 71–49	10–19 (5–13)	Mitchell Center (1,838); Mobile, AL
Sun Belt Women's Tournament
03/07/2017; 5:00 pm, ESPN3	(10)	vs. (7) Georgia State; First round	W 49–44	11–19	Lakefront Arena; New Orleans, LA
03/09/2017; 5:00 pm, ESPN3	(10)	vs. (2) Texas–Arlington; Quarterfinals	L 53–65	11–20	Lakefront Arena; New Orleans, LA
*Non-conference game. ^{#}Rankings from AP Poll. (#) Tournament seedings in parentheses. All times are in Eastern Time.

== See also ==
- 2016–17 South Alabama Jaguars men's basketball team
