= 2017 Sun Belt Conference men's basketball tournament =

- Classification: Division I
- Season: 2016–17
- Teams: 12
- Site: Lakefront Arena; New Orleans, Louisiana
- Champions: Troy (1st title)
- Winning coach: Phil Cunningham (1st title)
- MVP: Wesley Person Jr. (Troy)
- Television: ESPN3, ESPN2

2016–17 Sun Belt Conference men's basketball standings
	Conf.				Overall
Team	W		L	PCT	W		L	PCT
Texas–Arlington	14	–	4	.778	27	–	9	.750
Georgia State	12	–	6	.667	20	–	13	.606
Arkansas State	11	–	7	.611	20	–	12	.625
Texas State	11	–	7	.611	22	–	14	.611
Georgia Southern	11	–	7	.611	18	–	15	.545
Louisiana–Lafayette	10	–	8	.556	21	–	12	.636
Troy †	10	–	8	.556	22	–	15	.595
Coastal Carolina	10	–	8	.556	20	–	19	.513
South Alabama	7	–	11	.389	14	–	18	.438
Little Rock	6	–	12	.333	15	–	17	.469
Appalachian State	4	–	14	.222	9	–	21	.300
Louisiana–Monroe	2	–	16	.111	9	–	24	.273
† 2017 Sun Belt Conference tournament winner

The 2017 Sun Belt Conference men's basketball tournament is the postseason conference tournament for the Sun Belt Conference. The tournament was held at the Lakefront Arena in New Orleans, Louisiana from March 8 to March 12, 2017. The tournament winner received the conference's automatic bid into the NCAA tournament.

== Seeds ==
All 12 conference teams will compete in the conference tournament. Teams were seeded by record within the conference, with a tiebreaker system to seed teams with identical conference records. The top four teams received a bye to the quarterfinals.

Seed	School	Overall	Tiebreaker
1	Texas–Arlington	14–4	
2	Georgia State	12–6	
3	Georgia Southern	11–7	2–0 vs. ASU/TSU
4	Texas State	11–7	1–1 vs. ASU/GSU
5	Arkansas State	11–7	0–2 vs. Ga So/GSU
6	Troy	10–8	2–0 vs. CCU/ULL
7	Louisiana–Lafayette	10–8	1–1 vs. CCU/Troy
8	Coastal Carolina	10–8	0–2 vs. ULL/Troy
9	South Alabama	7–11	
10	Little Rock	6–12	
11	Appalachian State	4–14	
12	Louisiana–Monroe	2–16	

== Schedule ==
Game	Time	Matchup	Score	Television
First round – March 8
1	11:30 am	No. 9 South Alabama vs. No. 8 Coastal Carolina	67–80	ESPN3
2	2:00 pm	No. 12 Louisiana–Monroe vs. No. 5 Arkansas State	73–70 ^{OT}	ESPN3
3	5:00 pm	No. 10 Little Rock vs. No. 7 Louisiana–Lafayette	71–78	ESPN3
4	7:30 pm	No. 11 Appalachian State vs. No. 6 Troy	64–84	ESPN3
Quarterfinals – March 10
5	11:30 am	No. 8 Coastal Carolina vs No. 1 Texas–Arlington	51–74	ESPN3
6	2:00 pm	No. 12 Louisiana–Monroe vs No. 4 Texas State	63–51	ESPN3
7	5:00 pm	No. 7 Louisiana–Lafayette vs. No. 2 Georgia State	86–76	ESPN3
8	7:30 pm	No. 6 Troy vs. No. 3 Georgia Southern	90–70	ESPN3
Semifinals – March 11
9	11:30 am	No. 1 Texas–Arlington vs. No. 4 Texas State	83–62	ESPN3
10	2:00 pm	No. 2 Georgia State vs. No. 6 Troy	63–74	ESPN3
Final – March 12
11	1:00 pm	No. 4 Texas State vs. No. 6 Troy	53–59	ESPN2
*Game times in CST. Rankings denote tournament seed

== Bracket ==
First round Wednesday, March 8 ESPN3
8	Coastal Carolina	80
9	South Alabama	67
5	Arkansas State	70
12	Louisiana–Monroe	73*
7	Louisiana–Lafayette	78
10	Little Rock	71
6	Troy	84
11	Appalachian State	64

Quarterfinals; Friday, March 10; ESPN3
1	Texas–Arlington	74
8	Coastal Carolina	51
4	Texas State	63
12	Louisiana–Monroe	51
2	Georgia State	86
7	Louisiana–Lafayette	76
3	Georgia Southern	70
6	Troy	90

Semifinals; Saturday, March 11; ESPN3
1	Texas–Arlington	62
4	Texas State	83
2	Georgia State	63
6	Troy	74

Championship; Sunday, March 12; ESPN2
4	Texas State	53
6	Troy	59

== See also ==
2017 Sun Belt Conference women's basketball tournament
