= Brian Boyer =

American college basketball coach

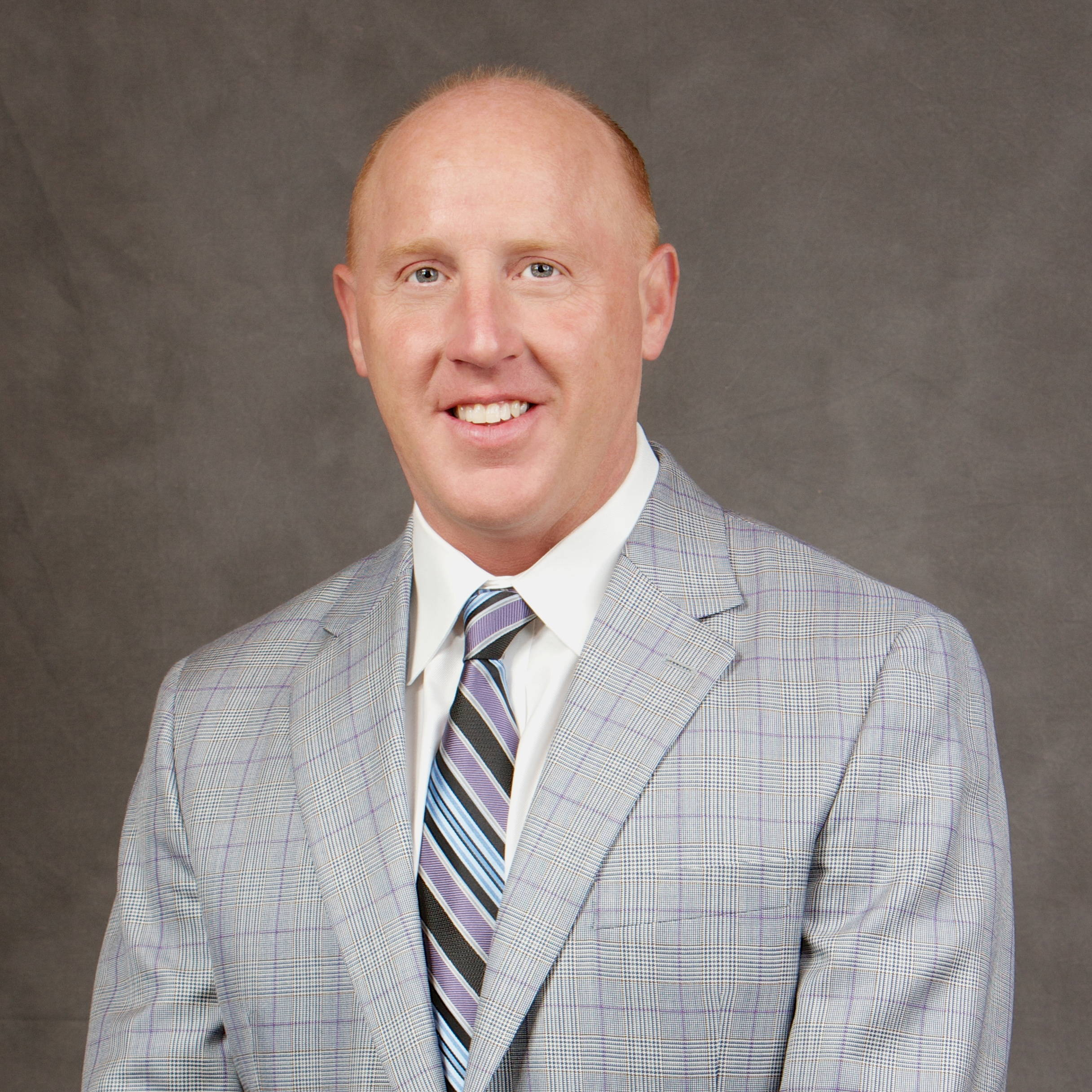

Biographical details
- Born: October 24, 1969 (age 57); Memphis, Missouri, U.S.

Coaching career (HC unless noted)
- 1989–1993: Missouri Western (asst. men's program)
- 1993–1995: Missouri Western (asst. women's program)
- 1995–1999: Arkansas State (asst.)
- 1999–2019: Arkansas State

Accomplishments and honors

Championships
- Sun Belt Conference Regular Season Championship (2003–04; 2013–14; 2015–16)

Awards
- 4x Sun Belt Conference Coach of the Year (2003–04; 2004–05; 2013–14; 2015–16)

Records
- 333–287 (.537)

Brian Boyer (born October 24, 1969) is a former American college basketball coach.

Boyer was the head coach women's basketball coach at Arkansas State University for 20 years and compiled an overall record of 333–287. He won more games than any coach (men's or women's) in the school's history.

== Early life and education ==
Boyer was born in Memphis, Missouri, a small farming community in the Northern part of the state. He attended Missouri Western where he earned a bachelor's degree in Physical Education in 1993.

== Coaching career ==
=== Missouri Western ===
Upon arriving at Missouri Western as a student, Boyer began working as assistant with the men's program in 1989 and moved to assistant with the men's program in 1993.

During his time at Missouri Western, the Griffons made five NCAA Division II appearances (1990, 1991, 1992, 1994 and 1995) and captured two conference championships and advanced to the Sweet 16 in 1990 while with the men's program.

After moving into his role with the women's program, Missouri Western and Boyer continued their joint success as the program made two NCAA Tournament appearances, including a trip to the Elite Eight in 1994 and a Final Four berth in 1995.

=== Arkansas State ===
In 1995, Boyer arrived at Arkansas State as an assistant under Jeff Mittie, who is the current head coach of the Kansas State Wildcats. Upon Mittie's departure in August 1999 to become the head coach at TCU, Boyer was promoted to the position of head coach.

In his first season as head coach in 1999–00, Boyer guided A-State to an 18–12 overall record and a second straight trip to the Women's National Invitation Tournament.

His teams returned to the postseason in 2003–04 and 2004–05, both of which resulted in appearances in the WNIT. During the 2005 tournament, A-State hosted Arkansas at the Convocation Center in front of the largest crowd in arena history at 10,892. A-State won the game 98–84 and advanced to quarterfinals where the squad fell to Iowa. In 2013–14 Boyer's teams began a run of three consecutive WNIT berths that also included two regular season Sun Belt Conference championships. During the run the Red Wolves played in the Sun Belt Conference championship game twice and compiled 75 wins during the span.

The 2013–14 season proved to be one of major significance for Boyer as he became the Sun Belt Conference's all-time leader in league victories, passing former La Tech coach Leon Barmore and former Florida International coach Cindy Russo who each had 136 wins on the sidelines.

Arkansas State missed the NCAA Tournament in 2014–15 despite compiling a record of 23–10 during the regular season. A-State also missed the NCAA Tournament at the end of 2015–16 season despite an 18-game winning streak and a 26–5 record during the regular season.

During the run, Boyer won two Sun Belt Conference Coach of the Year honors and helped Aundrea Gamble become the first player in league history to win three consecutive Student-Athlete of the Year honors.

== Coaching record ==
Record table
Season	Team	Overall	Conference	Standing	Postseason
Arkansas State Indians/Red Wolves (Sun Belt Conference) (1999–2019)
1999–00	Arkansas State	18–12	8–8	5th	WNIT First round
2000–01	Arkansas State	14–14	8–8	T–6th	
2001–02	Arkansas State	12–16	6–8	T–7th	
2002–03	Arkansas State	12–18	5–9	9th	
2003–04	Arkansas State	19–10	10–4	T–1st	WNIT First round
2004–05	Arkansas State	21–11	11–3	T–2nd	WNIT Third round
2005–06	Arkansas State	15–15	7–7	6th	
2006–07	Arkansas State	21–13	11–7	5th	WNIT Second round
2007–08	Arkansas State	20–12	13–2	3rd	
2008–09	Arkansas State	16–14	10–8	T–2nd	
2009–10	Arkansas State	13–18	7–11	7th	
2010–11	Arkansas State	18–14	9–7	T–5th	
2011–12	Arkansas State	12–18	6–10	9th	
2012–13	Arkansas State	15–15	12–8	4th	
2013–14	Arkansas State	22–12	14–4	1st	WNIT First round
2014–15	Arkansas State	24–11	16–4	2nd	WNIT Second round
2015–16	Arkansas State	27–6	19–1	1st	WNIT Second round
2016–17	Arkansas State	7–25	4–14	11th	
2017–18	Arkansas State	15–15	10–8	T–7th	
2018–19	Arkansas State	12–18	7–11	9th	
Arkansas State:		333–287 (.537)	193–145 (.571)		
Total:		333–287 (.537)			
National champion Postseason invitational champion Conference regular season champion Conference regular season and conference tournament champion Division regular season champion Division regular season and conference tournament champion Conference tournament champion
