= Arkansas State Red Wolves women's basketball =

Arkansas State Red Wolves
2026–27 Arkansas State Red Wolves women's basketball team
- University: Arkansas State University
- Head coach: Destinee Rogers (6th season)
- Location: Jonesboro, Arkansas
- Arena: First National Bank Arena (capacity: 10,563)
- Conference: Sun Belt
- Nickname: Red Wolves
- Colors: Scarlet and black

NCAA Division I tournament appearances
- 2025

Conference tournament champions
- 2025

Conference regular-season champions
- 2004, 2014, 2016

Uniforms
Home	Away	Alternate

The Arkansas State Red Wolves women's basketball team represents Arkansas State University in Jonesboro, Arkansas, United States. The school's team currently competes in the Sun Belt Conference. They play their home games at the First National Bank Arena.

== History ==
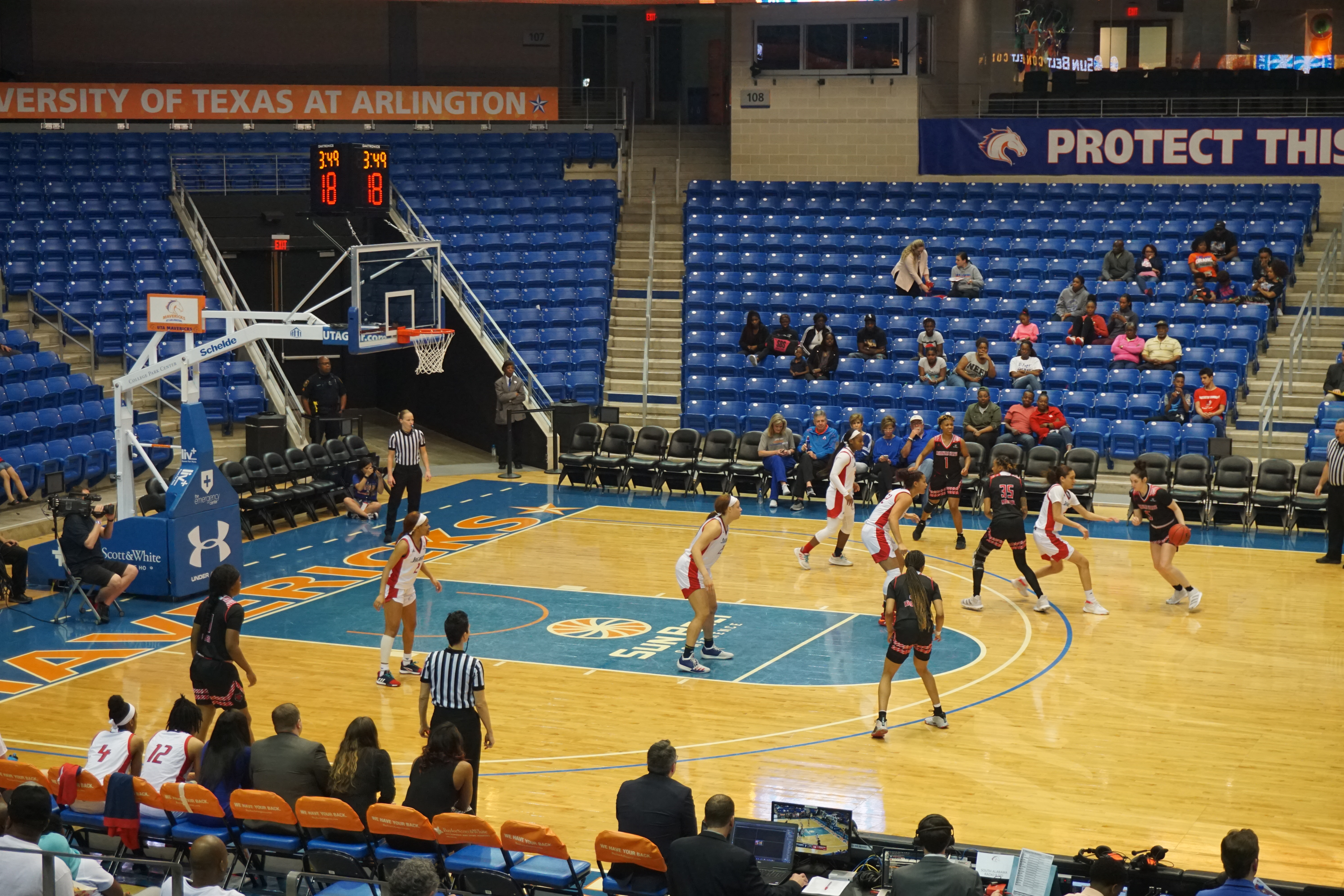
Arkansas State in action in the 2020 Sun Belt Conference women's basketball tournament

The Red Wolves made their first the NCAA Tournament appearance in 2025. They have also appeared in the NWIT in 1992, 1993 and 1994, winning the title over SMU in 1993 and finishing as runner up to Oklahoma in the following year. They also have appeared in the successor to the NWIT named the WNIT in 1999, 2000, 2004, 2005, 2007, 2014, 2015, and 2016. As of the end of the 2015–16 season, the Red Wolves have an all-time record of 704–497. The Red Wolves have played in the Sun Belt Conference since 1991. Prior to that, they previously played in the AWISA from 1974 to 1982, the Southland Conference from 1982 to 1987 and American South from 1987 to 1991.

== NCAA tournament results ==
The Red Wolves have appeared in one NCAA tournament.

Year	Seed	Round	Opponent	Result
2025	#15	First Round	#2 UConn	L 34–103

== Award winners ==
- Kay Yow Award

Brian Boyer – 2016
