= Holmes Center =

Multipurpose arena in North Carolina, US

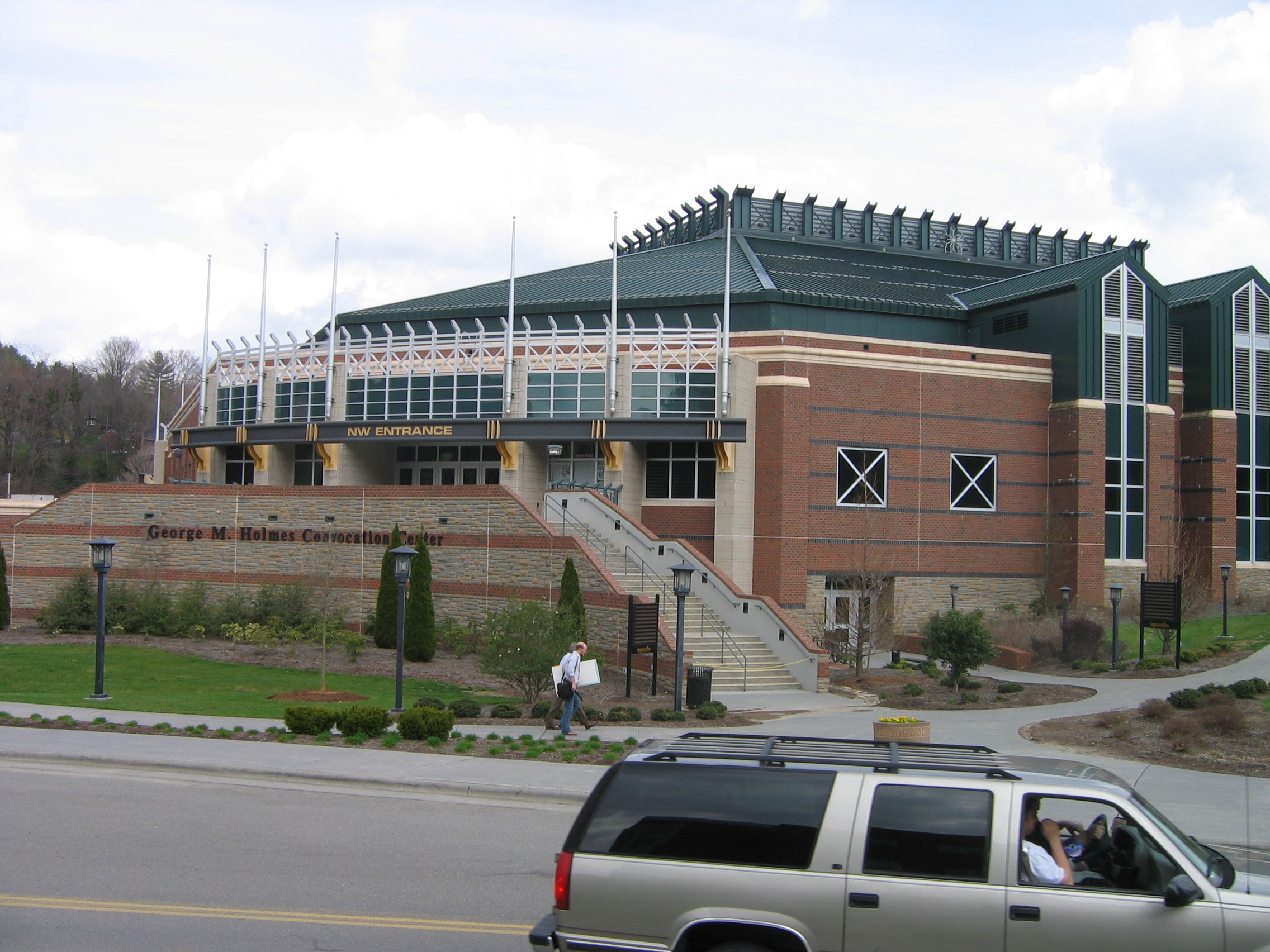
- Interactive map of Holmes Center
- Full name: George M. Holmes Convocation Center
- Location: 111 Rivers Street; Boone, North Carolina 28608
- Coordinates: 36.210624°N 81.675952°W
- Owner: Appalachian State University
- Operator: Appalachian State University
- Capacity: 8,325
- Surface: Hardwood

Construction
- Groundbreaking: December 5, 1997
- Opened: September 6, 2000
- Cost: $29 million ($54.2 million in 2025 dollars)
- Architects: Corley Redfoot Zack, Inc.
- Structural engineer: Walter P Moore
- General contractor: Metric Construction Company

Tenants
- Appalachian State Mountaineers (NCAA); Basketball (2000–present); Volleyball (2000–present); Indoor Track and Field (2000–present); High Country Grizzlies (NAL/AAL) (2017–2018)

The George M. Holmes Convocation Center (namely referred to as the Holmes Center) is an 8,325-seat multipurpose arena in Boone, North Carolina, United States, on the campus of Appalachian State University. The convocation center is named for George M. Holmes, a 1954 graduate and member of the North Carolina General Assembly. The arena itself is named for Seby Jones. It was built in 2000 and is home to four athletic teams: Appalachian State Mountaineers men's basketball, Appalachian State Mountaineers women's basketball, volleyball, and indoor track and field. The inaugural event was a men's basketball game held on November 17, 2000 between the Mountaineers and the Tar Heels of North Carolina. The facility replaced Varsity Gymnasium. The George M. Holmes Convocation Center’s mission is to provide facilities for the Department of Health, Leisure and Exercise Science and to support the academic processes of Appalachian State University. Serving as a multipurpose for the northwestern region of North Carolina, the center supports university sponsored events, such as commencement and college fair. Cultural events, concerts, trade shows, athletic events and other public assembly activities are also a part of the center’s programming.

In 2017 and 2018, it was home to the High Country Grizzlies, a professional indoor football team.

== Features ==
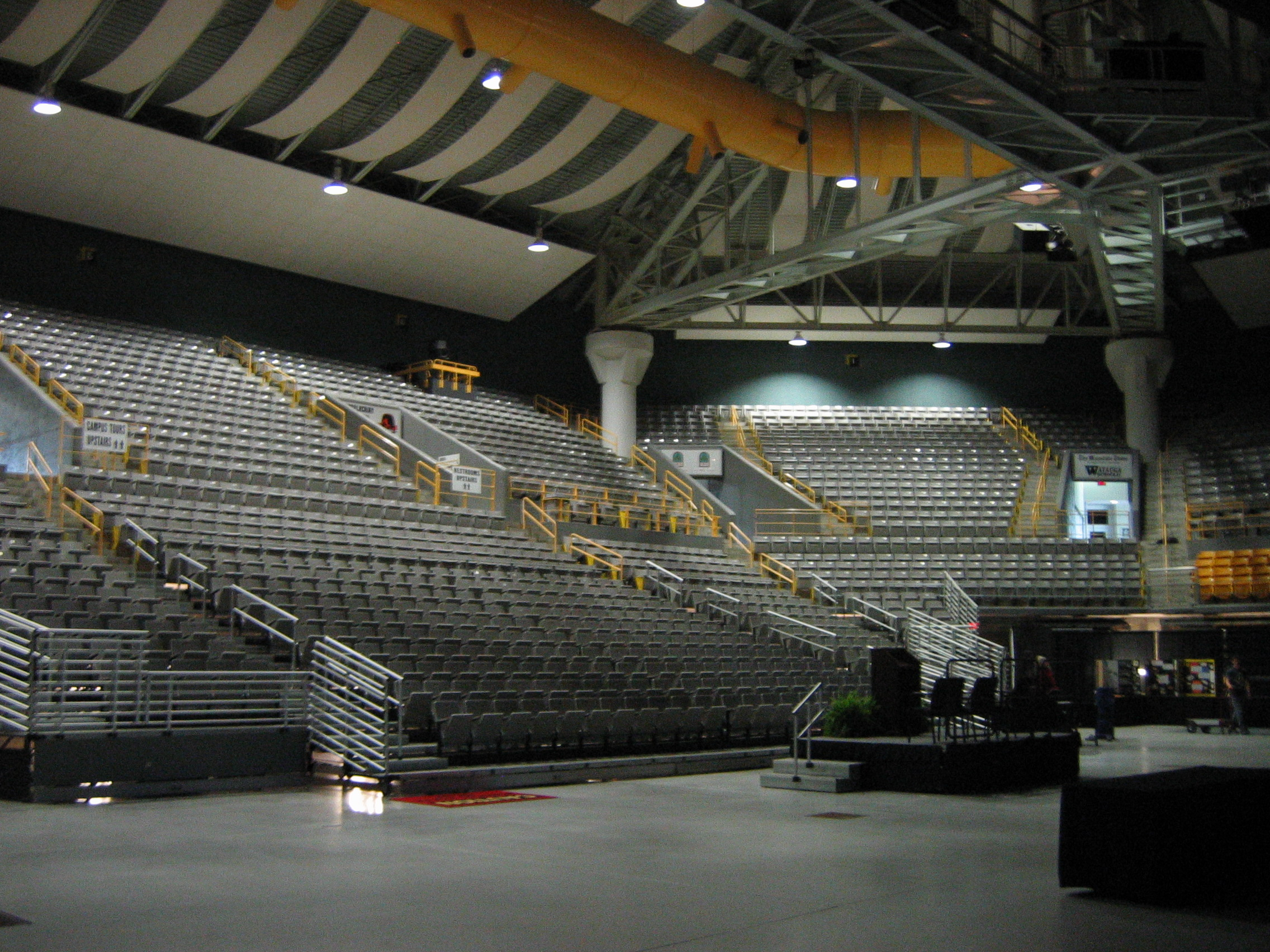
Inside the Holmes Center

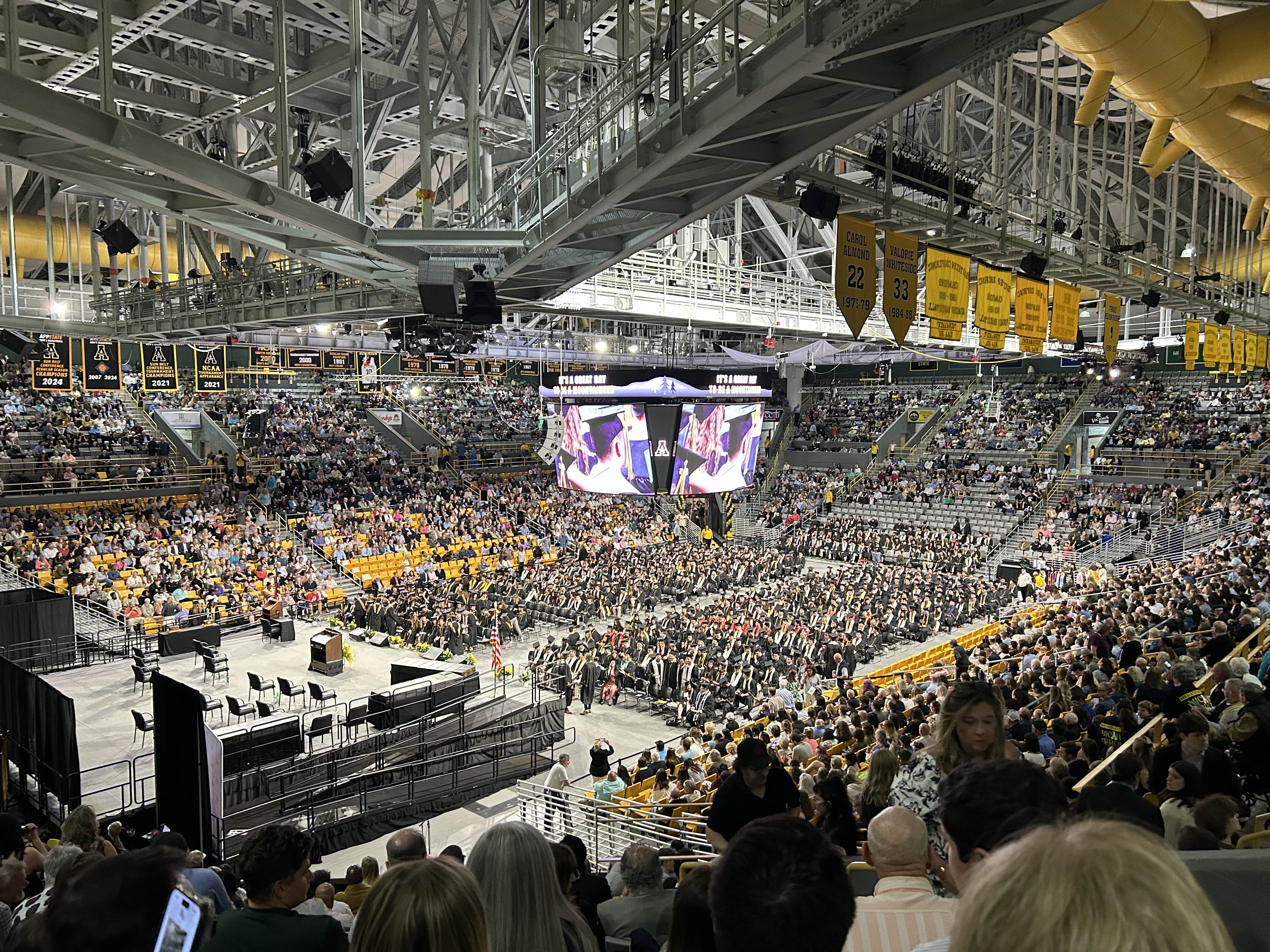
Interior of the Holmes Center during the 2025 graduation ceremony

Standing at the end of Rivers Street, the 200,840-square-foot (18,659 m^{2}) structure houses the Department of Health, Leisure and Exercise Science, and includes a multipurpose arena for community and cultural events, graduation and convocation ceremonies, trade shows, concerts, and athletic events.

The 8,325-seat arena has HLES offices, classrooms, laboratories, team areas and retractable seating.

A 300-meter directional Mondo track circles the upper concourse and is used by the indoor track and field teams for both practice and competition.

Student seating is located at midcourt for both volleyball, and behind the end line for basketball.

== Notable events ==
- The facility was opened with a celebration followed by a men’s basketball contest between Appalachian and North Carolina.
- In 2010 and 2019, the Appalachian State Mountaineers women's basketball team hosted and won the championship game of the Women's Basketball Invitational tournanment.
- Rap trio Migos performed on April 5, 2018. After the concert, members of the tour were arrested after the Boone Police Department found 420 grams of marijuana, 26 ounces of codeine, and Xanax. None of the three rappers were in the vehicle or charged.
- The Holmes Center has hosted concerts by Lil Wayne, The Avett Brothers, Lynyrd Skynyrd, The 1975, Migos, Kesha, Willie Nelson, The Beach Boys, Taking Back Sunday, All American Rejects, Yes, Eric Church, Rainbow Kitten Surprise, Bob Dylan, Blake Shelton, Dave Matthews, Trey Anastasio, and Widespread Panic.
- On December 3, 2023, an Appalachian State men's basketball game against Auburn University drew 7,037 fans. The Mountaineers won 69-64 against Bruce Pearl's Auburn Tigers. This was the team's first-ever win over a high-major opponent in the Holmes Center and first home win against a high-major opponent since 1993 when they defeated Nebraska in Varsity Gym. At the time, this win was only the third game ever played in front of 7,000 fans in the Holmes Center with the other games being the facility's opening contest against UNC and a 2009 game against Davidson that featured Stephen Curry.

== See also ==
- List of NCAA Division I basketball arenas
