= 2016–17 Georgia Southern Eagles men's basketball team =

American college basketball season

2016–17 Georgia Southern Eagles men's basketball

CBI, First Round
- Conference: Sun Belt Conference
- Record: 18–15 (11–7 Sun Belt)
- Head coach: Mark Byington (4th season)
- Assistant coaches: Andrew Wilson; Larry Dixon; Ben Betts
- Home arena: Hanner Fieldhouse

2016–17 Sun Belt Conference men's basketball standings
| | Conf. | | | | Overall |
| Team | W | | L | PCT | W | | L | PCT |
|---|---|---|---|---|---|---|---|---|
| Texas–Arlington | 14 | – | 4 | .778 | 27 | – | 9 | .750 |
| Georgia State | 12 | – | 6 | .667 | 20 | – | 13 | .606 |
| Arkansas State | 11 | – | 7 | .611 | 20 | – | 12 | .625 |
| Texas State | 11 | – | 7 | .611 | 22 | – | 14 | .611 |
| Georgia Southern | 11 | – | 7 | .611 | 18 | – | 15 | .545 |
| Louisiana–Lafayette | 10 | – | 8 | .556 | 21 | – | 12 | .636 |
| Troy † | 10 | – | 8 | .556 | 22 | – | 15 | .595 |
| Coastal Carolina | 10 | – | 8 | .556 | 20 | – | 19 | .513 |
| South Alabama | 7 | – | 11 | .389 | 14 | – | 18 | .438 |
| Little Rock | 6 | – | 12 | .333 | 15 | – | 17 | .469 |
| Appalachian State | 4 | – | 14 | .222 | 9 | – | 21 | .300 |
| Louisiana–Monroe | 2 | – | 16 | .111 | 9 | – | 24 | .273 |
† 2017 Sun Belt Conference tournament winner

The 2016–17 Georgia Southern Eagles men's basketball team represented Georgia Southern University during the 2016–17 NCAA Division I men's basketball season. The Eagles, led by fourth-year head coach Mark Byington, played their home games at Hanner Fieldhouse in Statesboro, Georgia as members of the Sun Belt Conference. They finished the season 18–18, 11–7 in Sun Belt play to finish in a three-way tie for third place. They lost in the quarterfinals of the Sun Belt tournament to Troy. They were invited to the College Basketball Invitational where they lost in the first round to Utah Valley.

== Previous season ==
The Eagles finished the 2015–16 season 14–17, 10–10 in Sun Belt play to finish in fifth place. They lost in the first round of the Sun Belt tournament to South Alabama.

== Roster ==
2016–17 Georgia Southern Eagles men's basketball team
Players
Coaches

| Pos. | # | Name | Height | Weight | Year | Hometown |
|---|---|---|---|---|---|---|
| F | 0 | Montae Glenn | 6 ft 8 in (2.03 m) | 230 lb (104 kg) | So | Carrollton, Georgia |
| G | 1 | Devonte Boykins | 6 ft 2 in (1.88 m) | 180 lb (82 kg) | Jr | Forest City, North Carolina |
| G | 2 | Mike Hughes | 6 ft 3 in (1.91 m) | 190 lb (86 kg) | Jr | Winston-Salem, North Carolina |
| G | 3 | Ike Smith | 6 ft 4 in (1.93 m) | 195 lb (88 kg) | So | Gainesville, Florida |
| G | 4 | Tookie Brown | 5 ft 11 in (1.8 m) | 180 lb (82 kg) | So | Madison, Georgia |
| F | 5 | B. J. Gladden | 6 ft 6 in (1.98 m) | 210 lb (95 kg) | Jr | Charlotte, North Carolina |
| G | 10 | Jake Allsmiller | 6 ft 5 in (1.96 m) | 185 lb (84 kg) | Jr | Nashville, Tennessee |
| F | 11 | Shawn O'Connell | 6 ft 8 in (2.03 m) | 210 lb (95 kg) | RS So | Roswell, Georgia |
| G | 12 | Aubrey McRae | 6 ft 3 in (1.91 m) | 185 lb (84 kg) | So | Augusta, Georgia |
| G | 13 | Quan Jackson | 6 ft 4 in (1.93 m) | 180 lb (82 kg) | Fr | Tallahassee, Florida |
| F | 14 | Coye Simmons | 6 ft 8 in (2.03 m) | 240 lb (109 kg) | Jr | Winston-Salem, North Carolina |
| G | 21 | James Holder | 6 ft 1 in (1.85 m) | 175 lb (79 kg) | Sr | Gwinnett, Georgia |
| G | 24 | Brandon Wimberly | 6 ft 1 in (1.85 m) | 170 lb (77 kg) | Jr | Macon, Georgia |
| F | 25 | David Georgiev | 6 ft 7 in (2.01 m) | 200 lb (91 kg) | Fr | Skopje, Macedonia |
| G | 30 | Jared Hamilton (redshirt) | 6 ft 4 in (1.93 m) | 190 lb (86 kg) | So | Charlotte, North Carolina |
| G | 33 | Dominique Bullock | 5 ft 11 in (1.8 m) | 183 lb (83 kg) | Sr | Valdosta, Georgia |

Head coach

- Mark Byington (UNC Wilmington)

Assistant coach(es)

- Andrew Wilson (Florida State)
- Larry Dixon (Johnson C. Smith)
- Ben Betts (Roanoke)

Legend

- (C) Team captain
- (S) Suspended
- (I) Ineligible
- (W) Walk-on
- Injured
- Current redshirt

Roster

== Schedule and results ==
| Date time, TV | Rank^{#} | Opponent^{#} | Result | Record | Site (attendance) city, state |
Exhibition
| 11/03/2016*; 7:00 pm | | Lees–McRae | W 106–51 | | Hanner Fieldhouse (1,501); Statesboro, GA |
Non-conference regular season
| 11/11/2016*; 7:00 pm, ACCN Extra | | at NC State | L 79–81 | 0–1 | PNC Arena (16,226); Raleigh, NC |
| 11/14/2016*; 7:00 pm | | Coastal Georgia | W 92–43 | 1–1 | Hanner Fieldhouse (1,628); Statesboro, GA |
| 11/20/2016*; 7:00 pm, ESPN3 | | at Mercer; Savannah Invitational | L 67–80 | 1–2 | Hawkins Arena (3,508); Macon, GA |
| 11/22/2016*; 7:00 pm | | at Akron; Savannah Invitational | L 67–75 | 1–3 | James A. Rhodes Arena (2,457); Akron, OH |
| 11/25/2016*; 2:30 pm | | vs. Florida A&M; Savannah Invitational | W 83–72 | 2–3 | Savannah Civic Center (491); Savannah, GA |
| 11/26/2016*; 2:30 pm | | vs. Radford; Savannah Invitational | W 65–64 | 3–3 | Savannah Civic Center; Savannah, GA |
| 12/01/2016*; 2:30 pm | | at Savannah State | W 94–75 | 4–3 | Tiger Arena (3,708); Savannah, GA |
| 12/04/2016*; 3:00 pm | | Florida Gulf Coast | L 82–85 | 4–4 | Hanner Fieldhouse (1,519); Statesboro, GA |
| 12/09/2016*; 9:00 pm, BTN | | at Minnesota | L 49–86 | 4–5 | Williams Arena (8,790); Minneapolis, MN |
| 12/13/2016*; 7:00 pm | | at Florida Gulf Coast | W 72–59 | 5–5 | Alico Arena (3,057); Fort Myers, FL |
| 12/15/2016*; 7:00 pm | | at FIU | W 75–68 | 6–5 | FIU Arena (639); Miami, FL |
| 12/20/2016*; 11:00 am | | at Winthrop | L 84–86 | 6–6 | Winthrop Coliseum (2,534); Rock Hill, SC |
| 12/22/2016*; 4:00 pm | | Fisk | W 106–58 | 7–6 | Hanner Fieldhouse (1,036); Statesboro, GA |
Sun Belt Conference regular season
| 12/31/2016; 12:30 pm | | Georgia State | W 88–65 | 8–6 (1–0) | Hanner Fieldhouse (2,356); Statesboro, GA |
| 01/07/2017; 5:00 pm | | Troy | W 86–82 | 9–6 (2–0) | Hanner Fieldhouse (1,639); Statesboro, GA |
| 01/09/2017; 7:00 pm | | South Alabama | W 84–79 ^{OT} | 10–6 (3–0) | Hanner Fieldhouse (1,391); Statesboro, GA |
| 01/14/2017; 8:15 pm | | at Louisiana–Lafayette | W 81–76 | 11–6 (4–0) | Cajundome (5,464); Lafayette, LA |
| 01/16/2017; 8:00 pm | | at Louisiana–Monroe | W 62–60 | 12–6 (5–0) | Fant–Ewing Coliseum (1,542); Monroe, LA |
| 01/21/2017; 5:00 pm, ESPN3 | | Appalachian State | W 92–88 | 13–6 (6–0) | Hanner Fieldhouse (2,938); Statesboro, GA |
| 01/23/2017; 7:00 pm, ESPN3 | | Coastal Carolina | W 91–80 | 14–6 (7–0) | Hanner Fieldhouse (1,527); Statesboro, GA |
| 01/28/2017; 8:00 pm, ESPN3 | | at South Alabama | L 66–78 | 14–7 (7–1) | Mitchell Center (2,439); Mobile, AL |
| 01/30/2017; 8:00 pm, ESPN3 | | at Troy | L 76–83 | 14–8 (7–2) | Trojan Arena (1,087); Troy, AL |
| 02/04/2017; 5:00 pm | | Louisiana–Monroe | W 76–62 | 15–8 (8–2) | Hanner Fieldhouse (2,859); Statesboro, GA |
| 02/06/2017; 7:00 pm, ESPN3 | | Louisiana–Lafayette | W 74–70 | 16–8 (9–2) | Hanner Fieldhouse (1,373); Statesboro, GA |
| 02/11/2017; 4:30 pm | | at Coastal Carolina | L 70–82 | 16–9 (9–3) | HTC Center (2,050); Conway, SC |
| 02/13/2017; 7:00 pm, ESPN3 | | at Appalachian State | L 78–83 | 16–10 (9–4) | Holmes Center (1,573); Boone, NC |
| 02/18/2017; 5:00 pm | | Texas State | W 70–67 | 17–10 (10–4) | Hanner Fieldhouse (2,281); Statesboro, GA |
| 02/20/2017; 7:00 pm, ASN | | UT Arlington | L 71–81 | 17–11 (10–5) | Hanner Fieldhouse (2,573); Statesboro, GA |
| 02/25/2017; 8:00 pm, ESPN3 | | at Arkansas State | W 72–60 | 18–11 (11–5) | Convocation Center (4,671); Jonesboro, AR |
| 02/27/2017; 7:30 pm, ASN | | at Little Rock | L 54–56 | 18–12 (11–6) | Jack Stephens Center (2,541); Little Rock, AR |
| 03/04/2017; 2:15 pm, ESPN3 | | at Georgia State | L 67–72 | 18–13 (11–7) | GSU Sports Arena (3,854); Atlanta, GA |
Sun Belt tournament
| 03/15/2017; 8:30 pm, ESPN3 | (3) | vs. (6) Troy; Quarterfinals | L 70–90 | 18–14 | Lakefront Arena; New Orleans, LA |
CBI
| 03/10/2017*; 7:00 pm | | Utah Valley; First Round | L 49–74 | 18–15 | Hanner Fieldhouse (603); Statesboro, GA |
*Non-conference game. ^{#}Rankings from AP Poll. (#) Tournament seedings in parentheses. All times are in Eastern Time.
