= 2016–17 Troy Trojans men's basketball team =

American college basketball season

2016–17 Troy Trojans men's basketball

Sun Belt tournament champions

NCAA tournament, First Round
- Conference: Sun Belt Conference
- Record: 22–15 (10–8 Sun Belt)
- Head coach: Phil Cunningham (4th season)
- Assistant coaches: Marcus Grant; Ben Fletcher; Adam Howard
- Home arena: Trojan Arena (Capacity 5,200)

2016–17 Sun Belt Conference men's basketball standings
	Conf.				Overall
Team	W		L	PCT	W		L	PCT
Texas–Arlington	14	–	4	.778	27	–	9	.750
Georgia State	12	–	6	.667	20	–	13	.606
Arkansas State	11	–	7	.611	20	–	12	.625
Texas State	11	–	7	.611	22	–	14	.611
Georgia Southern	11	–	7	.611	18	–	15	.545
Louisiana–Lafayette	10	–	8	.556	21	–	12	.636
Troy †	10	–	8	.556	22	–	15	.595
Coastal Carolina	10	–	8	.556	20	–	19	.513
South Alabama	7	–	11	.389	14	–	18	.438
Little Rock	6	–	12	.333	15	–	17	.469
Appalachian State	4	–	14	.222	9	–	21	.300
Louisiana–Monroe	2	–	16	.111	9	–	24	.273
† 2017 Sun Belt Conference tournament winner

The 2016–17 Troy Trojans men's basketball team represented Troy University during the 2016–17 NCAA Division I men's basketball season. The Trojans, led by fourth-year head coach Phil Cunningham, played their home games at Trojan Arena in Troy, Alabama and were members of the Sun Belt Conference. They finished the season 22–15, 10–8 in Sun Belt play to finish in a three-way tie for sixth place. The defeated Appalachian State, Georgia Southern, Georgia State, and Texas State to win the Sun Belt tournament championship. As a result, they received the conference's automatic bid to the NCAA tournament. As the No. 15 seed in the East region, they lost to Duke in the first round.

== Previous season ==
The Trojans finished the 2015–16 season 9–22, 4–16 in Sun Belt play to finish in last place. They failed to qualify for the Sun Belt tournament.

== Roster ==
2016–17 Troy Trojans men's basketball team
Players
Coaches

Pos.	#	Name	Height	Weight	Year	Hometown
G	0	Kevin Baker	6 ft 2 in (1.88 m)	180 lb (82 kg)	Jr	St. Louis, Missouri
G	1	Daniel Peace	6 ft 1 in (1.85 m)	182 lb (83 kg)	Sr	Decatur, Georgia
G	2	Jeremy Hollimon	6 ft 3 in (1.91 m)	195 lb (88 kg)	Sr	Gulfport, Mississippi
G	3	Wesley Person	6 ft 3 in (1.91 m)	190 lb (86 kg)	Jr	Brantley, Alabama
F	4	Juan Davis, Jr.	6 ft 8 in (2.03 m)	225 lb (102 kg)	Jr	West Point, Mississippi
G	11	B.J. Miller	6 ft 0 in (1.83 m)	185 lb (84 kg)	So	Meridian, Mississippi
G	13	Darian Adams	6 ft 3 in (1.91 m)	210 lb (95 kg)	Fr	Montgomery, Alabama
F/C	14	Jaro Moravek	6 ft 8 in (2.03 m)	240 lb (109 kg)	Jr	Handlová, Slovakia
F	15	Joshua Boykin	6 ft 5 in (1.96 m)	190 lb (86 kg)	Jr	Enterprise, Alabama
F	22	Whit Moreman	6 ft 8 in (2.03 m)	205 lb (93 kg)	Fr	LaGrange, Georgia
F	23	Jordon Varnado	6 ft 6 in (1.98 m)	215 lb (98 kg)	So	Brownsville, Tennessee
G/F	24	Shawn Hopkins	6 ft 5 in (1.96 m)	195 lb (88 kg)	So	Nokia, Finland
G/F	25	Devon Walker	6 ft 6 in (1.98 m)	203 lb (92 kg)	Sr	Winter Haven, Florida
F	30	Alex Hicks	6 ft 8 in (2.03 m)	215 lb (98 kg)	RS So	Seale, Alabama
F/C	33	Aaron Ariri	6 ft 8 in (2.03 m)	235 lb (107 kg)	Jr	Brampton, Ontario, Canada

Head coach

- Phil Cunningham (Campbellsville)

Assistant coach(es)

- Marcus Grant (Mississippi State)
- Ben Fletcher (Troy)
- Adam Howard (Western Kentucky)

Legend

- (C) Team captain
- (S) Suspended
- (I) Ineligible
- (W) Walk-on
- Injured
- Current redshirt

Roster

== Schedule and results ==
Date time, TV	Rank^{#}	Opponent^{#}	Result	Record	Site (attendance) city, state
Exhibition
11/03/2016*; 7:00 pm		Auburn–Montgomery	W 84–65		Trojan Arena; Troy, AL
Non-conference regular season
11/11/2016*; 7:00 pm		Toccoa Falls	W 135–76	1–0	Trojan Arena (867); Troy, AL
11/14/2016*; 7:00 pm, ESPN3		Eastern Illinois	W 70–67	2–0	Trojan Arena (905); Troy, AL
11/17/2016*; 7:00 pm		at UAB	L 51-74	2–1	Bartow Arena (4,656); Birmingham, AL
11/21/2016*; 12:00 pm		at Eastern Illinois	L 67–71	2–2	Lantz Arena (3,111); Charleston, IL
11/23/2016*; 9:00 pm		at San Francisco	L 67–79	2–3	War Memorial Gymnasium (734); San Francisco, CA
11/26/2016*; 12:00 am		at Hawaii	W 65–63	3–3	Stan Sheriff Center (5,838); Honolulu, HI
12/01/2016*; 7:00 pm, ESPN3		South Florida	L 74–80	3–4	Trojan Arena (876); Troy, AL
12/04/2016*; 5:15 pm, ESPN3		Alabama State	W 83–65	4–4	Trojan Arena (972); Troy, AL
12/10/2016*; 2:00 pm		Alabama A&M	W 88–59	5–4	Trojan Arena (765); Troy, AL
12/14/2016*; 7:00 pm		vs. Point	W 114–52	6–4	Dothan Civic Center (709); Dothan, AL
12/17/2016*; 9:30 pm, P12N		at No. 24 USC; Las Vegas Classic	L 77–82	6–5	Galen Center (3,941); Los Angeles, CA
12/19/2016*; 8:00 pm		at Wyoming; Las Vegas Classic	L 66–72	6–6	Arena-Auditorium (3,204); Laramie, WY
12/22/2016*; 4:30 pm		vs. Cornell; Las Vegas Classic	W 92–84	7–6	Orleans Arena; Paradise, NV
12/23/2016*; 4:30 pm		vs. Chicago State; Las Vegas Classic	W 83–65	8–6	Orleans Arena; Paradise, NV
Sun Belt Conference regular season
01/02/2017; 7:00 pm		at South Alabama	L 75–76	8–7 (0–1)	Mitchell Center (1,609); Mobile, AL
01/07/2017; 4:00 pm		at Georgia Southern	L 82–86	8–8 (0–2)	Hanner Fieldhouse (1,639); Statesboro, GA
01/09/2017; 8:00 pm, ESPN3		at Georgia State	W 80–77	9–8 (1–2)	GSU Sports Arena (1,400); Atlanta, GA
01/14/2017; 4:15 pm, ESPN3		UT Arlington	W 93–71	10–8 (2–2)	Trojan Arena (1,298); Troy, AL
01/16/2017; 7:00 pm, ESPN3		Texas State	L 71–75	10–9 (2–3)	Trojan Arena (1,176); Troy, AL
01/21/2017; 7:00 pm, ESPN3		at Arkansas State	L 80–82	10–10 (2–4)	Convocation Center (4,678); Jonesboro, AR
01/23/2017; 6:30 pm		at Little Rock	W 78–69	11–10 (3–4)	Jack Stephens Center (2,571); Little Rock, AR
01/28/2017; 4:15 pm, ESPN3		Georgia State	L 72–78	11–11 (3–5)	Trojan Arena (1,248); Troy, AL
01/30/2017; 7:00 pm, ESPN3		Georgia Southern	W 83–76	12–11 (4–5)	Trojan Arena (1,087); Troy, AL
02/04/2017; 4:15 pm, ESPN3		South Alabama	L 71–76	12–12 (4–6)	Trojan Arena (2,221); Troy, AL
02/11/2017; 7:15 pm, ESPN3		at Louisiana–Lafayette	W 100–88	13–12 (5–6)	Cajundome (3,822); Lafayette, LA
02/13/2017; 7:00 pm		at Louisiana–Monroe	W 73–72 ^{OT}	14–12 (6–6)	Cajundome (1,977); Lafayette, LA
02/18/2017; 4:15 pm, ESPN3		Coastal Carolina	W 87–78	15–12 (7–6)	Trojan Arena (1,288); Troy, AL
02/20/2017; 7:00 pm, ESPN3		Appalachian State	W 76–66	16–12 (8–6)	Trojan Arena (1,876); Troy, AL
02/25/2017; 4:30 pm		at Texas State	L 59–63	16–13 (8–7)	Strahan Coliseum (3,057); San Marcos, TX
02/27/2017; 7:00 pm		at UT Arlington	L 67–82	16–14 (8–8)	College Park Center (3,111); Arlington, TX
03/02/2017; 7:30 pm, ESPN3		Arkansas State	W 81–72	17–14 (9–8)	Trojan Arena (1,711); Troy, AL
03/04/2017; 4:15 pm, ESPN3		Little Rock	W 57–54	18–14 (10–8)	Trojan Arena (1,698); Troy, AL
Sun Belt tournament
03/08/2017; 7:30 pm, ESPN3	(6)	vs. (11) Appalachian State; First Round	W 84–64	19–14	Lakefront Arena; New Orleans, LA
03/10/2017; 7:30 pm, ESPN3	(6)	vs. (3) Georgia Southern; Quarterfinals	W 90–70	20–14	Lakefront Arena; New Orleans, LA
03/11/2017; 2:00 pm, ESPN3	(6)	vs. (2) Georgia State; Semifinals	W 74–63	21–14	Lakefront Arena; New Orleans, LA
03/12/2017; 1:00 pm, ESPN2	(6)	vs. (4) Texas State; Championship	W 59–53	22–14	Lakefront Arena; New Orleans, LA
NCAA tournament
03/17/2017; 6:20 pm, TBS	(15 E)	vs. (2 E) No. 7 Duke; First Round	L 65–87	22–15	Bon Secours Wellness Arena (17,732); Greenville, SC
*Non-conference game. ^{#}Rankings from AP Poll. (#) Tournament seedings in parentheses. E=East Region. All times are in Central Time.
