= 2016–17 Little Rock Trojans men's basketball team =

American college basketball season

2016–17 Little Rock Trojans men's basketball
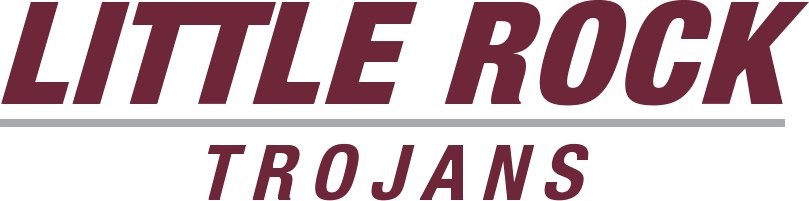
- Conference: Sun Belt Conference
- Record: 15–17 (6–12 Sun Belt)
- Head coach: Wes Flanigan (1st season)
- Assistant coaches: Kwanza Johnson; Mitch Cole; Solomon Bozeman
- Home arena: Jack Stephens Center

2016–17 Sun Belt Conference men's basketball standings
	Conf.				Overall
Team	W		L	PCT	W		L	PCT
Texas–Arlington	14	–	4	.778	27	–	9	.750
Georgia State	12	–	6	.667	20	–	13	.606
Arkansas State	11	–	7	.611	20	–	12	.625
Texas State	11	–	7	.611	22	–	14	.611
Georgia Southern	11	–	7	.611	18	–	15	.545
Louisiana–Lafayette	10	–	8	.556	21	–	12	.636
Troy †	10	–	8	.556	22	–	15	.595
Coastal Carolina	10	–	8	.556	20	–	19	.513
South Alabama	7	–	11	.389	14	–	18	.438
Little Rock	6	–	12	.333	15	–	17	.469
Appalachian State	4	–	14	.222	9	–	21	.300
Louisiana–Monroe	2	–	16	.111	9	–	24	.273
† 2017 Sun Belt Conference tournament winner

The 2016–17 Little Rock Trojans men's basketball team represented the University of Arkansas at Little Rock during the 2016–17 NCAA Division I men's basketball season. The Trojans, led by first-year head coach Wes Flanigan, played their home games at the Jack Stephens Center in Little Rock, Arkansas as members of the Sun Belt Conference. They finished the season 15–17, 6–12 in Sun Belt play to finish in tenth place. They lost in the first round of the Sun Belt tournament to Louisiana–Lafayette.

== Previous season ==
The Trojans finished the 2015–16 season 30–5, 17–3 in Sun Belt play to win the Sun Belt regular season championship. They defeated Louisiana–Lafayette and Louisiana–Monroe to win the Sun Belt tournament. As a result, the Trojans received the conference's automatic bid to the NCAA tournament as a No. 12 seed. In the First Round, they upset Purdue before losing in the second round to Iowa State.

Following the season, first-year head coach Chris Beard left the school to accept the head coaching position at UNLV. On March 31, 2016, the school hired Wes Flanigan as head coach.

== Roster ==
2016–17 Little Rock Trojans men's basketball team
Players
Coaches

Pos.	#	Name	Height	Weight	Year	Hometown
F	0	Ryan Pippins	6 ft 0 in (1.83 m)	200 lb (91 kg)	Fr	Little Rock, AR
G	1	Jalen Jackson	6 ft 6 in (1.98 m)	215 lb (98 kg)	Sr	West Memphis, AR
G	3	Andre Jones	6 ft 4 in (1.93 m)	195 lb (88 kg)	Fr	Little Rock, AR
F	5	Oliver Black	6 ft 9 in (2.06 m)	225 lb (102 kg)	RS So	Jackson, MS
F	10	Maurius Hill	6 ft 5 in (1.96 m)	220 lb (100 kg)	Sr	Homewood, IL
F	12	Lis Shoshi	6 ft 11 in (2.11 m)	225 lb (102 kg)	Sr	Peje, Kosovo
G	13	Marcus Johnson Jr.	5 ft 11 in (1.8 m)	175 lb (79 kg)	Sr	Charlotte, NC
F	15	Stetson Billings	6 ft 5 in (1.96 m)	195 lb (88 kg)	RS Sr	Strong, AR
G	20	Ben Marcus	6 ft 5 in (1.96 m)	220 lb (100 kg)	RS So	Pine Bluff, AR
G	21	Dayshawn Watkins	6 ft 0 in (1.83 m)	180 lb (82 kg)	RS Jr	North Little Rock, AR
F	22	Shandon Goldman	6 ft 9 in (2.06 m)	215 lb (98 kg)	Sr	Evansville, AR
G	23	Kemy Osse	6 ft 1 in (1.85 m)	208 lb (94 kg)	RS Sr	Montreal, QC
G	24	Evan Moorman	6 ft 1 in (1.85 m)	200 lb (91 kg)	RS Jr	Memphis, TN
G	30	Deondre Burns	6 ft 2 in (1.88 m)	185 lb (84 kg)	Fr	Yazoo City, MS

Head coach

- Wes Flanigan (Auburn)

Assistant coach(es)

- Kwanza Johnson (Tulsa)
- Mitch Cole (MT ST–Billings)
- Solomon Bozeman (Little Rock)

Legend

- (C) Team captain
- (S) Suspended
- (I) Ineligible
- (W) Walk-on
- Injured
- Current redshirt

Roster
Last update: September 16, 2016

== Schedule and results ==
Date time, TV	Rank^{#}	Opponent^{#}	Result	Record	Site (attendance) city, state
Non-conference regular season
11/12/2016*; 3:00 pm		Central Baptist; Lone Star Showcase	W 97–65	1–0	Jack Stephens Center (2,363); Little Rock, AR
11/14/2016*; 6:30 pm		Ozarks	W 100–61	2–0	Jack Stephens Center (1,781); Little Rock, AR
11/18/2016*; 6:30 pm		Idaho	L 57–65	2–1	Jack Stephens Center (2,630); Little Rock, AR
11/21/2016*; 5:00 pm		vs. St. Bonaventure; Lone Star Showcase	W 68–65	3–1	H-E-B Center at Cedar Park; Cedar Park, TX
11/22/2016*; 7:30 pm		vs. Pepperdine; Lone Star Showcase	L 65–66	3–2	H-E-B Center at Cedar Park; Cedar Park, TX
11/23/2016*; 7:30 pm		vs. Central Michigan; Lone Star Showcase	W 91–79	4–2	H-E-B Center at Cedar Park; Cedar Park, TX
11/29/2016*; 7:30 pm		at Central Arkansas	W 89–87 ^{OT}	5–2	Farris Center (2,643); Conway, AR
12/03/2016*; 3:00 pm		Tulsa	W 72–62	6–2	Jack Stephens Center (3,769); Little Rock, AR
12/08/2016*; 6:30 pm		Arkansas–Pine Bluff	W 67–52	7–2	Jack Stephens Center (2,756); Little Rock, AR
12/10/2016*; 3:00 pm		Central Arkansas	W 70–59	8–2	Jack Stephens Center (3,044); Little Rock, AR
12/14/2016*; 6:30 pm		at Northern Arizona	W 72–67	9–2	Walkup Skydome (584); Flagstaff, AZ
12/19/2016*; 7:00 pm		at Oral Roberts	L 48–63	9–3	Mabee Center (2,849); Tulsa, OK
12/21/2016*; 7:00 pm		at Florida	L 71–94	9–4	O'Connell Center (10,655); Gainesville, FL
Sun Belt Conference regular season
12/31/2016; 3:00 pm		Louisiana–Monroe	W 79–75 ^{OT}	10–4 (1–0)	Jack Stephens Center (2,287); Little Rock, AR
01/02/2017; 6:30 pm		Louisiana–Lafayette	L 52–69	10–5 (1–1)	Jack Stephens Center (3,739); Little Rock, AR
01/07/2017; 2:30 pm		at Appalachian State	W 76–68	11–5 (2–1)	Holmes Center (536); Boone, NC
01/09/2017; 6:00 pm, ASN		at Coastal Carolina	L 63–66	11–6 (2–2)	HTC Center (1,292); Conway, SC
01/14/2017; 6:00 pm		Arkansas State	L 72–77	11–7 (2–3)	Jack Stephens Center (5,161); Little Rock, AR
01/21/2017; 6:00 pm		South Alabama	W 73–56	12–7 (3–3)	Jack Stephens Center (2,760); Little Rock, AR
01/23/2017; 6:30 pm		Troy	L 69–78	12–8 (3–4)	Jack Stephens Center (2,571); Little Rock, AR
01/28/2017; 7:15 pm		at Louisiana–Lafayette	L 82–88	12–9 (3–5)	Cajundome (3,812); Lafayette, LA
01/30/2017; 7:00 pm		at Louisiana–Monroe	L 52–68	12–10 (3–6)	Fant–Ewing Coliseum (1,712); Monroe, LA
02/04/2017; 6:00 pm		Coastal Carolina	L 75–82	12–11 (3–7)	Jack Stephens Center (2,870); Little Rock, AR
02/06/2017; 6:30 pm, ASN		Appalachian State	W 69–62	13–11 (4–7)	Jack Stephens Center (1,969); Little Rock, AR
02/11/2017; 4:30 pm		at Texas State	L 49–56	13–12 (4–8)	Strahan Coliseum (2,435); San Marcos, TX
02/13/2017; 7:00 pm, ASN/ESPN3		at UT Arlington	L 55–71	13–13 (4–9)	College Park Center (1,591); Arlington, TX
02/18/2017; 7:00 pm, ESPN3		at Arkansas State	L 58–67	13–14 (4–10)	Convocation Center (6,367); Jonesboro, AR
02/25/2017; 6:00 pm		Georgia State	L 54–71	13–15 (4–11)	Jack Stephens Center (3,830); Little Rock, AR
02/27/2017; 6:30 pm, ASN		Georgia Southern	W 56–54	14–15 (5–11)	Jack Stephens Center (2,541); Little Rock, AR
03/02/2017; 7:00 pm		at South Alabama	W 62–57	15–15 (6–11)	Mitchell Center (1,628); Mobile, AL
03/04/2017; 4:15 pm, ESPN3		at Troy	L 54–57	15–16 (6–12)	Trojan Arena (1,698); Troy, AL
Sun Belt tournament
03/08/2017; 5:00 pm	(10)	vs. (7) Louisiana–Lafayette; First Round	L 71–78	15–17	Lakefront Arena; New Orleans, LA
*Non-conference game. ^{#}Rankings from AP Poll. (#) Tournament seedings in parentheses. All times are in Central Time.
