= 2016–17 Arkansas State Red Wolves men's basketball team =

American college basketball season

2016–17 Arkansas State Red Wolves men's basketball

Maui on the Mainland champion
- Conference: Sun Belt Conference
- Record: 20–12 (11–7 Sun Belt)
- Head coach: Grant McCasland (1st season)
- Assistant coaches: Ross Hodge; James Miller; Jareem Dowling
- Home arena: Convocation Center

2016–17 Sun Belt Conference men's basketball standings
	Conf.				Overall
Team	W		L	PCT	W		L	PCT
Texas–Arlington	14	–	4	.778	27	–	9	.750
Georgia State	12	–	6	.667	20	–	13	.606
Arkansas State	11	–	7	.611	20	–	12	.625
Texas State	11	–	7	.611	22	–	14	.611
Georgia Southern	11	–	7	.611	18	–	15	.545
Louisiana–Lafayette	10	–	8	.556	21	–	12	.636
Troy †	10	–	8	.556	22	–	15	.595
Coastal Carolina	10	–	8	.556	20	–	19	.513
South Alabama	7	–	11	.389	14	–	18	.438
Little Rock	6	–	12	.333	15	–	17	.469
Appalachian State	4	–	14	.222	9	–	21	.300
Louisiana–Monroe	2	–	16	.111	9	–	24	.273
† 2017 Sun Belt Conference tournament winner

The 2016–17 Arkansas State Red Wolves men's basketball team represented Arkansas State University during the 2016–17 NCAA Division I men's basketball season. The Red Wolves, led by first-year head coach Grant McCasland, played their home games at the Convocation Center in Jonesboro, Arkansas as members of the Sun Belt Conference. They finished the season 20–12, 11–7 in Sun Belt play to finish in a three-way tie for third place. As the No. 5 seed in the Sun Belt tournament, they lost to Louisiana–Monroe in the first round. Despite having 20 wins, they did not participate in a postseason tournament.

On March 13, 2017, head coach Grant McCasland left the school to accept the head coaching position at North Texas. On March 20, the school named Louisville assistant Mike Balado as their new head coach.

== Previous season ==
The Red Wolves finished the 2015–16 season 11–20, 7–13 in Sun Belt play to finish in a tie for ninth place. They failed to qualify for the Sun Belt tournament.

Prior to the season, head coach John Brady announced his intentions to resign following the season. On March 16, 2016, the school hired former Baylor assistant Grant McCasland as the new head coach.

== Roster ==
2016–17 Arkansas State Red Wolves men's basketball team
Players
Coaches

Pos.	#	Name	Height	Weight	Year	Hometown
G	0	Donte Thomas	6 ft 4 in (1.93 m)	200 lb (91 kg)	Sr	Washington, D.C.
G	1	Rashad Lindsey	5 ft 11 in (1.8 m)	165 lb (75 kg)	Jr	St. Louis, Missouri
F	2	Salif Boudie	6 ft 8 in (2.03 m)	205 lb (93 kg)	Fr	Mali, West Africa
G	3	Devin Carter	6 ft 4 in (1.93 m)	200 lb (91 kg)	RS Sr	Champaign, Illinois
G	5	C.J. Foster	6 ft 2 in (1.88 m)	185 lb (84 kg)	RS Jr	Lawrenceville, Georgia
F	10	Jahmiah Simmons	6 ft 4 in (1.93 m)	205 lb (93 kg)	Fr	St. Thomas, Virgin Islands
G	11	Christian Willis	6 ft 0 in (1.83 m)	200 lb (91 kg)	Fr	St. Louis, Missouri
G	12	Connor Kern	6 ft 4 in (1.93 m)	200 lb (91 kg)	RS So	Pickerington, Ohio
F	15	Christian Davis	6 ft 6 in (1.98 m)	205 lb (93 kg)	So	Dallas, Texas
G	23	Deven Simms	6 ft 4 in (1.93 m)	200 lb (91 kg)	Jr	St. Louis, Missouri
F	25	Jake Scoggins	6 ft 9 in (2.06 m)	210 lb (95 kg)	Fr	Benton, Arkansas
F	30	Nelson Nweke	6 ft 8 in (2.03 m)	235 lb (107 kg)	Jr	Grandview, Missouri
F	32	Tamas Bruce	6 ft 7 in (2.01 m)	200 lb (91 kg)	Jr	Osceola, Arkansas
G	33	Andrew Riley	5 ft 10 in (1.78 m)	180 lb (82 kg)	Jr	Jackson, Mississippi

Head coach

- Grant McCasland (Baylor)

Assistant coach(es)

- Ross Hodge (East Texas A&M)
- James Miller (Arizona State)
- Jareem Dowling (Maryland Eastern Shore)

Legend

- (C) Team captain
- (S) Suspended
- (I) Ineligible
- (W) Walk-on
- Injured
- Current redshirt

Roster

== Schedule and results ==
Date time, TV	Rank^{#}	Opponent^{#}	Result	Record	Site (attendance) city, state
Exhibition
10/27/2016*; 7:00 pm		UA–Monticello	W 76–59		Convocation Center (1,377); Jonesboro, AR
11/05/2016*; 1:00 pm		Henderson State	W 71–49		Convocation Center (846); Jonesboro, AR
Non-conference regular season
11/11/2016*; 7:00 pm		at North Dakota State	L 66–76	0–1	Scheels Center (5,005); Fargo, ND
11/14/2016*; 7:00 pm		Central Baptist	W 100–57	1–1	Convocation Center (1,283); Jonesboro, AR
11/17/2016*; 5:30 pm, FS1		at Georgetown; Maui Invitational	W 78–72	2–1	McDonough Gymnasium (2,136); Washington, D.C.
11/19/2016*; 5:00 pm		at Army; Maui on the Mainland semifinals	W 60–57	3–1	Christl Arena (921); West Point, NY
11/20/2016*; 11:00 am		vs. Chattanooga; Maui on the Mainland finals	W 73–67	4–1	Christl Arena (120); West Point, NY
11/22/2016*; 7:30 pm		SIU Edwardsville	W 75–57	5–1	Convocation Center (2,366); Jonesboro, AR
11/27/2016*; 1:30 pm		Lehigh	W 97–89	6–1	Convocation Center (2,074); Jonesboro, AR
11/30/2016*; 7:00 pm		Cleveland State	W 78–51	7–1	Convocation Center (1,631); Jonesboro, AR
12/03/2016*; 7:00 pm		at TCU	L 54–77	7–2	Schollmaier Arena (6,022); Fort Worth, TX
12/14/2016*; 7:00 pm		at UT Martin	W 87–68	8–2	Skyhawk Arena (1,098); Martin, TN
12/16/2016*; 7:00 pm		at Central Arkansas	W 89–77	9–2	Farris Center (1,942); Conway, AR
12/21/2016*; 8:00 pm, SECN		vs. Alabama; Huntsville Showcase	L 52–67	9–3	Von Braun Center (6,572); Huntsville, AL
12/23/2016*; 6:00 pm, BTN		at Minnesota	L 75–82	9–4	Williams Arena (9,588); Minneapolis, MN
Sun Belt Conference regular season
12/31/2016; 7:00 pm		Louisiana–Lafayette	W 74–71	10–4 (1–0)	Convocation Center (2,056); Jonesboro, AR
01/02/2017; 7:00 pm		Louisiana–Monroe	W 76–45	11–4 (2–0)	Convocation Center (2,954); Jonesboro, AR
01/07/2017; 3:30 pm		at Coastal Carolina	L 65–80	11–5 (2–1)	HTC Center (1,463); Conway, SC
01/09/2017; 6:00 pm		at Appalachian State	L 57–70	11–6 (2–2)	Holmes Center (522); Boone, NC
01/14/2017; 6:00 pm		at Little Rock	W 77–72	12–6 (3–2)	Jack Stephens Center (5,161); Little Rock, AR
01/21/2017; 7:00 pm, ESPN3		Troy	W 82–80	13–6 (4–2)	Convocation Center (4,678); Jonesboro, AR
01/23/2017; 7:00 pm, ESPN3		South Alabama	W 74–62	14–6 (5–2)	Convocation Center (4,440); Jonesboro, AR
01/28/2017; 4:00 pm		at Louisiana–Monroe	W 73–63	15–6 (6–2)	Fant–Ewing Coliseum (2,211); Monroe, LA
01/30/2017; 7:00 pm		at Louisiana–Lafayette	W 88–69	16–6 (7–2)	Cajundome (3,230); Lafayette, LA
02/04/2017; 7:00 pm, ESPN3		Appalachian State	W 79–78	17–6 (8–2)	Convocation Center (4,117); Jonesboro, AR
02/06/2017; 7:00 pm, ESPN3		Coastal Carolina	W 67–57	18–6 (9–2)	Convocation Center (2,870); Jonesboro, AR
02/11/2017; 4:30 pm		at UT Arlington	L 75–81	18–7 (9–3)	College Park Center (2,737); Arlington, TX
02/13/2017; 7:00 pm		at Texas State	L 58–62	18–8 (9–4)	Strahan Coliseum (1,953); San Marcos, TX
02/18/2017; 7:00 pm, ESPN3		Little Rock	W 67–58	19–8 (10–4)	Convocation Center (6,367); Jonesboro, AR
02/25/2017; 7:00 pm, ESPN3		Georgia Southern	L 60–72	19–9 (10–5)	Convocation Center (4,671); Jonesboro, AR
02/27/2017; 7:00 pm, ESPN3		Georgia State	W 78–67	20–9 (11–5)	Convocation Center (4,482); Jonesboro, AR
03/02/2017; 7:30 pm, ESPN3		at Troy	L 72–81	20–10 (11–6)	Trojan Arena (1,711); Troy, AL
03/04/2017; 3:00 pm		at South Alabama	L 70–73	20–11 (11–7)	Mitchell Center (1,838); Mobile, AL
Sun Belt tournament
03/08/2017; 2:00 pm, ESPN3	(5)	vs. (12) Louisiana–Monroe; First Round	L 70–73 ^{OT}	20–12	Lakefront Arena (1,045); New Orleans, LA
*Non-conference game. ^{#}Rankings from AP Poll. (#) Tournament seedings in parentheses. All times are in Central Time.
