= 2016–17 Minnesota Golden Gophers men's basketball team =

American college basketball season

2016–17 Minnesota Golden Gophers men's basketball

NCAA tournament, First Round
- Conference: Big Ten Conference
- Record: 24–10 (11–7 Big Ten)
- Head coach: Richard Pitino (4th season)
- Assistant coaches: Ed Conroy (1st year); Ben Johnson (4th year); Kimani Young (4th year)
- Home arena: Williams Arena

2016–17 Big Ten Conference men's basketball standings
	Conf.				Overall
Team	W		L	PCT	W		L	PCT
No. 15 Purdue	14	–	4	.778	27	–	8	.771
No. 25 Wisconsin	12	–	6	.667	27	–	10	.730
Maryland	12	–	6	.667	24	–	9	.727
Minnesota	11	–	7	.611	24	–	10	.706
No. 23 Michigan †	10	–	8	.556	26	–	12	.684
Northwestern	10	–	8	.556	24	–	12	.667
Michigan State	10	–	8	.556	20	–	15	.571
Iowa	10	–	8	.556	19	–	15	.559
Illinois	8	–	10	.444	20	–	15	.571
Ohio State	7	–	11	.389	17	–	15	.531
Indiana	7	–	11	.389	18	–	16	.529
Penn State	6	–	12	.333	15	–	18	.455
Nebraska	6	–	12	.333	12	–	19	.387
Rutgers	3	–	15	.167	15	–	18	.455
† 2017 Big Ten tournament winner Rankings from AP poll

The 2016–17 Minnesota Golden Gophers men's basketball team represented the University of Minnesota in the 2016–17 NCAA Division I men's basketball season. The Gophers, led by fourth-year head coach Richard Pitino, were members of the Big Ten Conference and played their home games at Williams Arena in Minneapolis, Minnesota. They finished the season 24–10, 11–7 in Big Ten play to finish in fourth place. In the Big Ten tournament, they beat Michigan State in the quarterfinals before losing to Michigan in the semifinals. They received an at-large bid to the NCAA tournament as a No. 5 seed. The bid marked their first trip to the Tournament since 2013. In the First Round, they lost to No. 12-seeded Middle Tennessee.

Head coach Richard Pitino was named Big Ten Coach of the Year. Reggie Lynch was named defensive player of the year. Nate Mason was named to the All-Big Ten First Team.

== Previous season ==
The Golden Gophers finished the 2015–16 season with a record of 8–23, 2–16 in Big Ten play to finish in 13th place in conference. They lost in the first round of the Big Ten tournament to Illinois.

The season was marred by the suspensions of three players, Kevin Dorsey, Nate Mason and Dupree McBrayer, on March 1, 2016 for allegedly posting a sex video online. The players were suspended for the rest of the season.

== Offseason ==
In May, 2016, Illinois State transfer, Reggie Lynch, was arrested by University police on suspicion of rape. In August, it was determined that charges would not be filed against Lynch. Lynch was reinstated to the team in September.

=== Departures ===
Name	Number	Pos.	Height	Weight	Year	Hometown	Notes
Kevin Dorsey	4	G	6'0"	175	Freshman	Waldforf, MD	Transferred to Colorado State
Jarvis Johnson	12	G	6'1"	185	Freshman	Minneapolis, MN	Retired from basketball due to a heart condition
Charles Buggs	23	F	6'9"	220	RS Junior	Arlington, TX	Graduate transferred to USC
Joey King	24	F	6'9"	235	Senior	Eagan, MN	Graduated

=== Incoming transfers ===
Name	Number	Pos.	Height	Weight	Year	Hometown	Previous School
Akeem Springs	0	G	6'4"	210	RS Senior	Waukegan, IL	Transferred from Milwaukee. Will be eligible to play since Springs graduated from UW–Milwaukee.

=== 2016 recruiting class ===
College recruiting information
Name	Hometown	School	Height	Weight	Commit date
Amir Coffey; SG	Hopkins, MN	Hopkins High School	6 ft 7 in (2.01 m)	195 lb (88 kg)	Sep 21, 2015
Amir Coffey; SG	Recruit ratings: Scout: Rivals: 247Sports: ESPN:				
Eric Curry; PF	Little Rock, AR	Southwest Christian Academy	6 ft 8 in (2.03 m)	215 lb (98 kg)	Sep 23, 2015
Eric Curry; PF	Recruit ratings: Scout: Rivals: 247Sports: ESPN:				
Michael Hurt; SF	Rochester, MN	John Marshall High School	6 ft 7 in (2.01 m)	185 lb (84 kg)	Jan 16, 2015
Michael Hurt; SF	Recruit ratings: Scout: Rivals: 247Sports: ESPN:				
Overall recruit ranking:
Note: In many cases, Scout, Rivals, 247Sports, On3, and ESPN may conflict in their listings of height and weight.; In these cases, the average was taken. ESPN grades are on a 100-point scale.; Sources: "2016 Minnesota Signees". ESPN.; "2016 Team Ranking". Rivals.

=== 2017 recruiting class ===
College recruiting information (2017)
Name	Hometown	School	Height	Weight	Commit date
Isaiah Washington; PG	Bronx, NY	St. Raymond School For Boys	6 ft 0 in (1.83 m)	162 lb (73 kg)	Sep 11, 2016
Isaiah Washington; PG	Recruit ratings: Scout: Rivals: 247Sports: ESPN:				
Jamir Harris; CG	Elizabeth, NJ	The Patrick School	6 ft 2 in (1.88 m)	185 lb (84 kg)	Sep 21, 2016
Jamir Harris; CG	Recruit ratings: Scout: Rivals: 247Sports: ESPN:				
Overall recruit ranking:
Note: In many cases, Scout, Rivals, 247Sports, On3, and ESPN may conflict in their listings of height and weight.; In these cases, the average was taken. ESPN grades are on a 100-point scale.; Sources: "2017 Minnesota Commits". Rivals.; "2017 Team Ranking". Rivals.

=== 2018 recruiting class ===
College recruiting information (2018)
Name	Hometown	School	Height	Weight	Commit date
Daniel Oturu; PF	St. Paul, MN	Cretin-Derham Hall	6 ft 9 in (2.06 m)	211 lb (96 kg)	Jan 19, 2017
Daniel Oturu; PF	Recruit ratings: Scout: Rivals: 247Sports: ESPN:				
Overall recruit ranking:
Note: In many cases, Scout, Rivals, 247Sports, On3, and ESPN may conflict in their listings of height and weight.; In these cases, the average was taken. ESPN grades are on a 100-point scale.; Sources: "2018 Minnesota Commits". Rivals.; "2018 Team Ranking". Rivals.

== Roster ==
2016–17 Minnesota Golden Gophers men's basketball team
Players
Coaches

Pos.	#	Name	Height	Weight	Year	Previous school	Hometown
G	0	Akeem Springs	6 ft 4 in (1.93 m)	210 lb (95 kg)	RS Sr	Waukegan; Milwaukee	Waukegan, IL
G	1	Dupree McBrayer	6 ft 4 in (1.93 m)	175 lb (79 kg)	So	Sunrise Christian Academy	Queens, NY
G	2	Nate Mason	6 ft 1 in (1.85 m)	185 lb (84 kg)	Jr	Arlington Country Day	Decatur, GA
F	3	Jordan Murphy	6 ft 6 in (1.98 m)	230 lb (104 kg)	So	Brennan	San Antonio, TX
G	4	Brady Rudrud (W)	6 ft 3 in (1.91 m)	185 lb (84 kg)	Fr	Eden Prairie	Eden Prairie, MN
G	5	Amir Coffey	6 ft 8 in (2.03 m)	190 lb (86 kg)	Fr	Hopkins	Hopkins, MN
G	10	Darin Haugh (W)	5 ft 10 in (1.78 m)	170 lb (77 kg)	RS Sr	Bethany Lutheran	Prior Lake, MN
G	15	Stephon Sharp (W)	6 ft 3 in (1.91 m)	195 lb (88 kg)	So	Hopkins	Bloomington, MN
F	20	Davonte Fitzgerald (injured)	6 ft 8 in (2.03 m)	205 lb (93 kg)	RS Jr	Tucker; Texas A&M	Atlanta, GA
C	21	Bakary Konaté	6 ft 11 in (2.11 m)	230 lb (104 kg)	Jr	Sunrise Christian Academy	Bamako, Mali
C	22	Reggie Lynch	6 ft 9 in (2.06 m)	260 lb (118 kg)	RS Jr	Edina; Illinois State	Edina, MN
F	24	Eric Curry	6 ft 9 in (2.06 m)	220 lb (100 kg)	Fr	Southwest Christian Academy	Little Rock, AR
F	32	Ahmad Gilbert	6 ft 6 in (1.98 m)	210 lb (95 kg)	So	Constitution	Philadelphia, PA
F	41	Gaston Diedhiou	6 ft 9 in (2.06 m)	230 lb (104 kg)	Jr	Canarias Academy	Dakar, Senegal
F	42	Michael Hurt	6 ft 7 in (2.01 m)	210 lb (95 kg)	Fr	John Marshall	Rochester, MN

Head coach

- Richard Pitino (Providence)

Assistant coach(es)

- Ed Conroy (The Citadel)
- Ben Johnson (Minnesota)
- Kimani Young (UTEP)

Legend

- (C) Team captain
- (S) Suspended
- (I) Ineligible
- (W) Walk-on
- Injured
- Current redshirt

Roster

== Schedule and results ==
Date time, TV	Rank^{#}	Opponent^{#}	Result	Record	High points	High rebounds	High assists	Site (attendance) city, state
Exhibition
Nov 3, 2016*; 7:00 pm, BTN+		Bemidji State	W 83–59		22 – Murphy	14 – Curry	5 – Coffey	Williams Arena (8,014); Minneapolis, MN
Non-conference regular season
Nov 11, 2016*; 7:00 pm, BTN+		Louisiana–Lafayette	W 86–74	1–0	15 – Tied	8 – Tied	7 – Mason	Williams Arena (8,453); Minneapolis, MN
Nov 14, 2016*; 7:00 pm, BTN+		Texas–Arlington; Golden Gopher Showcase	W 84–67	2–0	14 – Lynch	12 – Murphy	7 – Mason	Williams Arena (7,986); Minneapolis, MN
Nov 16, 2016*; 7:00 pm, BTN+		Mount St. Mary's; Golden Gopher Showcase	W 80–56	3–0	18 – Murphy	12 – Murphy	5 – Lynch	Williams Arena (7,940); Minneapolis, MN
Nov 18, 2016*; 8:00 pm, BTN		St. John's; Gavitt Tipoff Games	W 92–86	4–0	30 – Coffey	11 – Lynch	7 – Mason	Williams Arena (8,873); Minneapolis, MN
Nov 22, 2016*; 7:00 pm, ESPN3		Arkansas; Golden Gopher Showcase	W 85–71	5–0	19 – Coffey	7 – Tied	7 – Mason	Williams Arena (8,997); Minneapolis, MN
Nov 25, 2016*; 7:00 pm, BTN+		Southern Illinois; Golden Gopher Showcase	W 57–45	6–0	13 – Coffey	11 – Curry	6 – McBrayer	Williams Arena (9,603); Minneapolis, MN
Nov 28, 2016*; 6:00 pm, ESPNU		at Florida State; ACC–Big Ten Challenge	L 67–75	6–1	11 – Tied	8 – Curry	3 – Tied	Donald L. Tucker Center (5,993); Tallahassee, FL
Dec 3, 2016*; 7:00 pm, ESPN3		vs. Vanderbilt; Sioux Falls Showcase	W 56–52	7–1	16 – Murphy	14 – Murphy	6 – McBrayer	Sanford Pentagon (3,250); Sioux Falls, SD
Dec 6, 2016*; 7:00 pm, BTN		NJIT	W 74–68	8–1	19 – Springs	8 – Coffey	3 – Tied	Williams Arena (8,189); Minneapolis, MN
Dec 9, 2016*; 8:00 pm, BTN		Georgia Southern	W 86–49	9–1	18 – McBrayer	8 – Konate	9 – Mason	Williams Arena (8,790); Minneapolis, MN
Dec 11, 2016*; 4:00 pm, BTN		Northern Illinois	W 77–57	10–1	18 – Lynch	11 – Lynch	6 – Mason	Williams Arena (8,625); Minneapolis, MN
Dec 14, 2016*; 7:00 pm, BTN+		LIU Brooklyn	W 76–66	11–1	21 – McBrayer	8 – Curry	7 – Mason	Williams Arena (8,461); Minneapolis, MN
Dec 23, 2016*; 6:00 pm, BTN		Arkansas State	W 82–75	12–1	19 – McBrayer	8 – Murphy	7 – Mason	Williams Arena (9,588); Minneapolis, MN
Big Ten regular season
Dec 27, 2016; 8:00 pm, ESPN2		Michigan State	L 74–75 ^{OT}	12–2 (0–1)	18 – Mason	21 – Murphy	4 – Mason	Williams Arena (11,407); Minneapolis, MN
Jan 1, 2017; 3:30 pm, BTN		at No. 15 Purdue	W 91–82 ^{OT}	13–2 (1–1)	31 – Mason	7 – Curry	11 – Mason	Mackey Arena (14,428); West Lafayette, IN
Jan 5, 2017; 8:00 pm, ESPNU		at Northwestern	W 70–66	14–2 (2–1)	17 – Coffey	8 – Lynch	7 – Mason	Welsh-Ryan Arena (7,215); Evanston, IL
Jan 8, 2017; 6:30 pm, BTN		Ohio State	W 78–68	15–2 (3–1)	19 – Coffey	11 – Murphy	5 – Tied	Williams Arena (11,267); Minneapolis, MN
Jan 11, 2017; 6:00 pm, BTN	No. 24	at Michigan State	L 47–65	15–3 (3–2)	14 – Mason	6 – Tied	2 – Coffey	Breslin Center (14,797); East Lansing, MI
Jan 14, 2017; 11:00 am, ESPNU	No. 24	at Penn State	L 50–52	15–4 (3–3)	12 – Lynch	7 – Coffey	4 – Mason	Bryce Jordan Center (11,759); University Park, PA
Jan 21, 2017; 3:30 pm, BTN		No. 17 Wisconsin	L 76–78 ^{OT}	15–5 (3–4)	19 – Coffey	7 – Lynch	10 – Mason	Williams Arena (14,625); Minneapolis, MN
Jan 25, 2017; 6:00 pm, BTN		at Ohio State	L 72–78	15–6 (3–5)	21 – Mason	10 – Springs	4 – Tied	Value City Arena (11,206); Columbus, OH
Jan 28, 2017; 1:15 pm, BTN		No. 22 Maryland	L 78–85	15–7 (3–6)	23 – Springs	10 – Tied	9 – Coffey	Williams Arena (11,191); Minneapolis, MN
Feb 4, 2017; 3:00 pm, BTN		at Illinois	W 68–59	16–7 (4–6)	15 – Lynch	6 – Tied	3 – Tied	State Farm Center (15,544); Champaign, IL
Feb 8, 2017; 8:00 pm, BTN		Iowa	W 101–89 ^{2OT}	17–7 (5–6)	25 – Tied	19 – Murphy	7 – Mason	Williams Arena (11,481); Minneapolis, MN
Feb 11, 2017; 11:00 am, ESPNU		at Rutgers	W 72–63	18–7 (6–6)	17 – Murphy	11 – Murphy	5 – Tied	Louis Brown Athletic Center (6,008); Piscataway, NJ
Feb 15, 2017; 8:00 pm, BTN		Indiana	W 75–74	19–7 (7–6)	30 – Mason	15 – Murphy	4 – Tied	Williams Arena (11,658); Minneapolis, MN
Feb 19, 2017; 6:00 pm, BTN		Michigan	W 83–78 ^{OT}	20–7 (8–6)	16 – Murphy	15 – Murphy	8 – Mason	Williams Arena (12,091); Minneapolis, MN
Feb 22, 2017; 7:30 pm, BTN		at No. 24 Maryland	W 89–75	21–7 (9–6)	18 – McBrayer	8 – Murphy	3 – Tied	Xfinity Center (17,349); College Park, MD
Feb 25, 2017; 2:00 pm, BTN		Penn State	W 81–71	22–7 (10–6)	16 – Tied	16 – Murphy	8 – Mason	Williams Arena (14,625); Minneapolis, MN
Mar 2, 2017; 6:00 pm, ESPN		Nebraska	W 88–73	23–7 (11–6)	25 – Mason	11 – Murphy	6 – McBrayer	Williams Arena (12,321); Minneapolis, MN
Mar 5, 2017; 5:00 pm, BTN		at No. 22 Wisconsin	L 49–66	23–8 (11–7)	17 – Mason	8 – Lynch	4 – Coffey	Kohl Center (17,287); Madison, WI
Big Ten tournament
Mar 10, 2017; 1:30 pm, ESPN	(4)	vs. (5) Michigan State; Quarterfinals	W 63–58	24–8	16 – Lynch	13 – Murphy	3 – Mason	Verizon Center (12,334); Washington, D.C.
Mar 11, 2017; 12:00 pm, CBS	(4)	vs. (8) Michigan; Semifinals	L 77–84	24–9	23 – Mason	9 – Murphy	4 – Tied	Verizon Center (13,984); Washington, D.C.
NCAA tournament
Mar 16, 2017*; 3:00 pm, TNT	(5 S)	vs. (12 S) Middle Tennessee; First Round	L 72–81	24–10	17 – Coffey	9 – Murphy	5 – McBrayer	BMO Harris Bradley Center (17,303); Milwaukee, WI
*Non-conference game. ^{#}Rankings from AP Poll. (#) Tournament seedings in parentheses. All times are in Central Time.

== Rankings ==
Ranking movements Legend: ██ Increase in ranking ██ Decrease in ranking — = Not ranked RV = Received votes
	Week																			
Poll	Pre	1	2	3	4	5	6	7	8	9	10	11	12	13	14	15	16	17	18	Final
AP	—	—	—	—	—	—	—	—	—	24	RV	—	—	—	—	—	—	—	—	Not released
Coaches	—	—	—	—	—	—	—	—	—	24	RV	—	—	—	—	—	—	—	—	—

*AP does not release post-NCAA tournament rankings
