= 2016–17 Georgia State Panthers men's basketball team =

American college basketball season

2016–17 Georgia State Panthers men's basketball

Cancún Challenge Mayan Div. champions

CIT, first round
- Conference: Sun Belt Conference
- Record: 20–13 (12–6 Sun Belt)
- Head coach: Ron Hunter (6th season)
- Assistant coaches: Sharman White (1st season); Ray McCallum (1st season); Claude Pardue (6th season)
- Home arena: GSU Sports Arena

2016–17 Sun Belt Conference men's basketball standings
	Conf.				Overall
Team	W		L	PCT	W		L	PCT
Texas–Arlington	14	–	4	.778	27	–	9	.750
Georgia State	12	–	6	.667	20	–	13	.606
Arkansas State	11	–	7	.611	20	–	12	.625
Texas State	11	–	7	.611	22	–	14	.611
Georgia Southern	11	–	7	.611	18	–	15	.545
Louisiana–Lafayette	10	–	8	.556	21	–	12	.636
Troy †	10	–	8	.556	22	–	15	.595
Coastal Carolina	10	–	8	.556	20	–	19	.513
South Alabama	7	–	11	.389	14	–	18	.438
Little Rock	6	–	12	.333	15	–	17	.469
Appalachian State	4	–	14	.222	9	–	21	.300
Louisiana–Monroe	2	–	16	.111	9	–	24	.273
† 2017 Sun Belt Conference tournament winner

The 2016–17 Georgia State Panthers men's basketball team represented Georgia State University during the 2016–17 NCAA Division I men's basketball season. The team's head coach was Ron Hunter who was in his sixth season at Georgia State. The Panthers played their home games at the GSU Sports Arena in Atlanta as members of the Sun Belt Conference. They finished the season 20–13, 12–6 in Sun Belt play to finish in second place. They defeated Louisiana–Lafayette in the quarterfinals of the Sun Belt tournament to advance to the semifinals where they lost to Troy. They were invited to the CollegeInsider.com Tournament where they lost in the first round to Texas A&M–Corpus Christi.

== Previous season ==
The Panthers finished the 2015–16 season 16–14, 9–11 in Sun Belt play to finish in sixth place. They lost in the first round of the Sun Belt tournament to Texas State.

== Off-season ==
After the end of the 2015–16 season, work was completed on the new GSU Practice Facility, an indoor gym complete with six courts. This addition was mandated by head coach Ron Hunter after the March Madness run in 2015.

Assistant coach Everick Sullivan was hired by Lenoir-Rhyne University to serve as head basketball coach after coaching the Panthers for five seasons.

Shortly afterwards, Sharman White, the head basketball coach of Metro Atlanta high school Miller Grove was hired after winning his team seven state titles in his last eight seasons. He set a state record with six titles in a row (2009–14). Among his coaching recognitions, White has been awarded the Naismith Atlanta Tip-Off Club Bobby Cremins Award, named the USA Today National Coach Of The Year, and was most recently named the National High School Coaches Association (NHSCA) Coach Of The Year. Before joining the Georgia State staff, White compiled a 373–86 career coaching record over a 19-year career.

Another assistant coach, Daryl LaBarrie, also left the Panthers to work as assistant coach at his alma mater, Georgia Tech. He was eventually replaced by former Detroit head coach Ray McCallum.

== Departures ==
Name	Number	Pos.	Height	Weight	Year	Hometown	Notes
Kevin Ware	32	G	6'2"	170	Senior	Conyers, Georgia	Graduated
T.J. Shipes	31	F	6'7"	225	Senior	Buford, Georgia	Graduated
Markus Crider	33	F	6'6"	205	Senior	Dayton, Ohio	Graduated
Jalen Brown	15	C	6'8"	235	Senior	Buchanan, Michigan	Graduated

=== Incoming transfers ===
Name	Number	Pos.	Height	Weight	Year	Hometown	Previous School
Justin Seymour	20	G	6'3"	205	Senior	Atlanta, Georgia	Graduate transfer from Murray State and is eligible to play in the 2016–17 season. He has one year of eligibility remaining.
Jordan Tyson	50	F	6'10"	225	Sophomore	Cincinnati, Ohio	Transferred from St. Bonaventure. Under NCAA transfer rules, Tyson will have to sit out for the 2016–17 season. Will have three years of remaining eligibility.

== Recruiting class ==
College recruiting information
Name	Hometown	School	Height	Weight	Commit date
D'Marcus Simonds #25 SG	Gainesville, Georgia	Gainesville High School	6 ft 3 in (1.91 m)	180 lb (82 kg)	Apr 23, 2015
D'Marcus Simonds #25 SG	Recruit ratings: Scout: Rivals: 247Sports: ESPN:				
Chris Clerkley; PF	Perry, Georgia	Perry High School	6 ft 9 in (2.06 m)	210 lb (95 kg)	May 26, 2015
Chris Clerkley; PF	Recruit ratings: Scout: Rivals: 247Sports: ESPN:				
Overall recruit ranking: Scout: NA Rivals: NA ESPN: NA
Note: In many cases, Scout, Rivals, 247Sports, On3, and ESPN may conflict in their listings of height and weight.; In these cases, the average was taken. ESPN grades are on a 100-point scale.; Sources: "Georgia State Panthers". ESPN.; "2016 Team Ranking". Rivals.

== Roster ==
2016–17 Georgia State Panthers men's basketball team
Players
Coaches

Pos.	#	Name	Height	Weight	Year	Previous school	Hometown
G	0	Nile Felton (W)	6 ft 3 in (1.91 m)	160 lb (73 kg)	Fr	Union	Atlanta, Georgia
F	1	Jeremy Hollowell (C)	6 ft 8 in (2.03 m)	210 lb (95 kg)	Sr	Lawrence Central / Indiana	Indianapolis, Indiana
G	2	Malik Benlevi	6 ft 5 in (1.96 m)	205 lb (93 kg)	So	Jenkins	Savannah, Georgia
G	4	Isaiah Dennis (C)	6 ft 0 in (1.83 m)	190 lb (86 kg)	Sr	Eagle's Landing	McDonough, Georgia
G	10	Austin Donaldson	6 ft 2 in (1.88 m)	185 lb (84 kg)	So	Jonesboro	Jonesboro, Georgia
G	11	Isaiah Williams	6 ft 1 in (1.85 m)	170 lb (77 kg)	Jr	Buford / Samford	Buford, Georgia
F	14	Chris Clerkly	6 ft 9 in (2.06 m)	210 lb (95 kg)	Fr	Perry	Perry, Georgia
G	15	D'Marcus Simonds	6 ft 3 in (1.91 m)	180 lb (82 kg)	Fr	Gainesville	Gainesville, Georgia
G	20	Justin Seymour	6 ft 3 in (1.91 m)	215 lb (98 kg)	Sr	Wheeler / Murray State	Atlanta, Georgia
F	21	Willie Clayton (C)	6 ft 8 in (2.03 m)	245 lb (111 kg)	RS Sr	Thomasville / Charlotte	Thomasville, Georgia
F	23	Jordan Session	6 ft 7 in (2.01 m)	220 lb (100 kg)	Jr	Eagle's Landing	McDonough, Georgia
G	24	Devin Mitchell	6 ft 4 in (1.93 m)	180 lb (82 kg)	RS So	Collins Hill / Alabama	Suwanee, Georgia
G	30	Jeff Thomas	6 ft 5 in (1.96 m)	190 lb (86 kg)	So	Norwalk	Norwalk, Ohio
G	34	Carter Cagle	6 ft 4 in (1.93 m)	200 lb (91 kg)	Jr	Johnson	Gainesville, Georgia
F	50	Jordan Tyson (redshirt)	6 ft 10 in (2.08 m)	225 lb (102 kg)	So	Walnut Hills / St. Bonaventure	Cincinnati, Ohio

Head coach

- Ron Hunter (Miami (OH))

Assistant coach(es)

- Ray McCallum (Ball State)
- Sharman White
- Claude Pardue (Emory)

Legend

- (C) Team captain
- (S) Suspended
- (I) Ineligible
- (W) Walk-on
- Injured
- Current redshirt

== Schedule and results ==
Date time, TV	Rank^{#}	Opponent^{#}	Result	Record	Site (attendance) city, state
Exhibition
November 04*; 7:00 pm		USC Aiken	W 92–79		GSU Sports Arena (1,243); Atlanta, Georgia
November 07*; 7:00 pm		Point	W 97–44		GSU Sports Arena (1,167); Atlanta, Georgia
Non-conference regular season
November 11*; 7:00 pm, ESPN3		Thomas	W 111–69	1–0	GSU Sports Arena (1,690); Atlanta, Georgia
November 14*; 9:00 pm, SECN		at Auburn; Cancun Challenge	L 65–83	1–1	Auburn Arena (6,980); Auburn, Alabama
November 18*; 7:00 pm, BTN		at No. 15 Purdue; Cancun Challenge	L 56–64	1–2	Mackey Arena (14,302); West Lafayette, Indiana
November 22*; 12:30 pm, YouTube		vs. NJIT; Cancun Challenge	W 74–53	2–2	Hard Rock Hotel Riviera Maya (1,610); Cancún, Mexico
November 23*; 3:00 pm, YouTube		vs. Eastern Kentucky; Cancun Challenge	W 82–65	3–2	Hard Rock Hotel Riviera Maya (1,610); Cancún, Mexico
November 30*; 7:00 pm, ESPN3		Wright State; Barefoot for Barefeet	W 81–74	4–2	GSU Sports Arena (1,256); Atlanta, Georgia
December 4*; 5:00 pm, SECN		at Mississippi State	L 60–82	4–3	Humphrey Coliseum (6,805); Starkville, Mississippi
December 10*; 2:00 pm, ESPN3		Georgia Southwestern	W 83–52	5–3	GSU Sports Arena (907); Atlanta, Georgia
December 14*; 7:00 pm, ESPN3		Alabama A&M	W 94–79	6–3	GSU Sports Arena (1,183); Atlanta, Georgia
December 18*; 2:00 pm		at Old Dominion	L 46–58	6–4	Ted Constant Convocation Center (4,052); Norfolk, Virginia
December 21*; 7:30 pm, CUSAN		at Middle Tennessee	W 64–56	7–4	Murphy Center (4,502); Murfreesboro, Tennessee
December 28*; 2:00 pm, ESPN3		UMass	L 65–74	7–5	GSU Sports Arena (1,639); Atlanta, Georgia
Sun Belt Conference regular season
December 31; 12:30 pm		at Georgia Southern; Modern Day Hate	L 65–88	7–6 (0–1)	Hanner Fieldhouse (2,356); Statesboro, Georgia
January 7; 2:15 pm, ESPN3		South Alabama	W 78–77	8–6 (1–1)	GSU Sports Arena (1,231); Atlanta, Georgia
January 9; 7:00 pm, ESPN3		Troy	L 77–80	8–7 (1–2)	GSU Sports Arena (1,400); Atlanta, Georgia
January 14; 5:00 pm		at Louisiana–Monroe	W 74–65 ^{OT}	9–7 (2–2)	Fant–Ewing Coliseum (1,634); Monroe, Louisiana
January 16; 8:00 pm		at Louisiana–Lafayette	W 101–86	10–7 (3–2)	Cajundome (3,497); Lafayette, Louisiana
January 21; 2:15 pm, ESPN3		Coastal Carolina	W 76–56	11–7 (4–2)	GSU Sports Arena (1,479); Atlanta, Georgia
January 23; 7:00 pm, ESPN3		Appalachian State	W 83–72	12–7 (5–2)	GSU Sports Arena (1,418); Atlanta, Georgia
January 28; 7:00 pm, ESPN3		at Troy	W 78–72	13–7 (6–2)	Trojan Arena (1,248); Troy, Alabama
January 30; 9:00 pm, ASN		at South Alabama	W 83–80	14–7 (7–2)	Mitchell Center (2,110); Mobile, Alabama
February 4; 2:15 pm, ESPN3		Louisiana–Lafayette	W 85–82	15–7 (8–2)	GSU Sports Arena (1,951); Atlanta, Georgia
February 6; 7:00 pm, ESPN3		Louisiana–Monroe	W 69–55	16–7 (9–2)	GSU Sports Arena (1,015); Atlanta, Georgia
February 11; 3:30 pm, ESPN3		at Appalachian State	L 72–77	16–8 (9–3)	Holmes Center (2,169); Boone, North Carolina
February 13; 7:00 pm		at Coastal Carolina	L 64–65	16–9 (9–4)	HTC Center (2,061); Conway, South Carolina
February 18; 2:15 pm, ESPN3		UT Arlington	L 67–68	16–10 (9–5)	GSU Sports Arena (1,800); Atlanta, Georgia
February 20; 7:00 pm, ESPN3		Texas State	W 67–51	17–10 (10–5)	GSU Sports Arena (1,406); Atlanta, Georgia
February 25; 7:00 pm		at Little Rock	W 71–54	18–10 (11–5)	Jack Stephens Center (3,830); Little Rock, Arkansas
February 27; 8:00 pm, ESPN3		at Arkansas State	L 67–78	18–11 (11–6)	Convocation Center (4,482); Jonesboro, Arkansas
March 5; 2:15 pm, ESPN3		Georgia Southern; Modern Day Hate	W 72–67	19–11 (12–6)	GSU Sports Arena (3,854); Atlanta, Georgia
Sun Belt tournament
March 10; 6:00 pm, ESPN3	(2)	vs. (7) Louisiana–Lafayette; Quarterfinals	W 86–76	20–11	Lakefront Arena; New Orleans, Louisiana
March 11; 2:15 pm, ESPN3	(2)	vs. (6) Troy; Semifinals	L 63-74	20–12	Lakefront Arena; New Orleans, Louisiana
CIT
March 15*; 8:00 pm, Facebook Live		at Texas A&M–Corpus Christi; First Round	L 64–80	20–13	Dugan Wellness Center (897); Corpus Christi, Texas
*Non-conference game. ^{#}Rankings from AP Poll. (#) Tournament seedings in parentheses. All times are in Eastern Time.
