= 2016–17 Coastal Carolina Chanticleers men's basketball team =

American college basketball season

2016–17 Coastal Carolina Chanticleers men's basketball

CBI, Runner-up
- Conference: Sun Belt Conference
- Record: 20–19 (10–8 Sun Belt)
- Head coach: Cliff Ellis (10th season)
- Assistant coaches: Benny Moss; Stacey Palmore; Patrick Blake
- Home arena: HTC Center

2016–17 Sun Belt Conference men's basketball standings
	Conf.				Overall
Team	W		L	PCT	W		L	PCT
Texas–Arlington	14	–	4	.778	27	–	9	.750
Georgia State	12	–	6	.667	20	–	13	.606
Arkansas State	11	–	7	.611	20	–	12	.625
Texas State	11	–	7	.611	22	–	14	.611
Georgia Southern	11	–	7	.611	18	–	15	.545
Louisiana–Lafayette	10	–	8	.556	21	–	12	.636
Troy †	10	–	8	.556	22	–	15	.595
Coastal Carolina	10	–	8	.556	20	–	19	.513
South Alabama	7	–	11	.389	14	–	18	.438
Little Rock	6	–	12	.333	15	–	17	.469
Appalachian State	4	–	14	.222	9	–	21	.300
Louisiana–Monroe	2	–	16	.111	9	–	24	.273
† 2017 Sun Belt Conference tournament winner

The 2016–17 Coastal Carolina Chanticleers women basketball team represented Coastal Carolina University during the 2016–17 NCAA Division I men's basketball season. The Chanticleers, led by tenth-year head coach Cliff Ellis, played their home games at the HTC Center in Conway, South Carolina as first-year members of the Sun Belt Conference. They finished the season 20–19, 10–8 in Sun Belt play to finish in a three-way tie for sixth place. As the No. 8 seed in the Sun Belt tournament, they defeated South Alabama before losing to Texas–Arlington in the quarterfinals. They received an invitation to the College Basketball Invitational where they defeated Hampton, Loyola (MD) and UIC to advance to the best-of-three finals series against Wyoming where they won 3 games.

== Previous season ==
The Chanticleers finished the 2015–16 season 21–12, 12–6 in Big South play to finish in a tie for second place. The season marked the Chanticleers final season in the Big South. They lost in the quarterfinals of the Big South tournament to Gardner–Webb. They received an invitation to the CollegeInsider.com Tournament where they defeated Mercer, New Hampshire, and Grand Canyon to advance to the semifinals. In the semifinals, the Chanticleers lost to UC Irvine.

== Roster ==
2016–17 Coastal Carolina Chanticleers men's basketball team
Players
Coaches

Pos.	#	Name	Height	Weight	Year	Hometown
G	0	Jaylen Robinson	6 ft 1 in (1.85 m)	170 lb (77 kg)	Jr	Clinton, North Carolina
F	1	Kevin Holmes, Jr.	6 ft 9 in (2.06 m)	190 lb (86 kg)	So	Virginia Beach, Virginia
G	2	Artur Labinowicz	6 ft 4 in (1.93 m)	190 lb (86 kg)	Fr	Charlotte, North Carolina
F	3	Joseph Williams-Powell	6 ft 7 in (2.01 m)	210 lb (95 kg)	Jr	Saginaw, Michigan
G	4	Christian Adams	6 ft 3 in (1.91 m)	190 lb (86 kg)	So	Winston-Salem, North Carolina
G	5	Jaylen Shaw	6 ft 1 in (1.85 m)	190 lb (86 kg)	Jr	Hartsville, South Carolina
G	11	Josh Peterson	5 ft 10 in (1.78 m)	165 lb (75 kg)	Fr	Woodbridge, Virginia
F	12	Michel Enanga	6 ft 5 in (1.96 m)	215 lb (98 kg)	RS Sr	Yaoundé, Cameroon
F	15	Amidou Bamba	6 ft 8 in (2.03 m)	240 lb (109 kg)	RS Fr	Toronto, Ontario, Canada
F	20	Demario Beck	6 ft 8 in (2.03 m)	220 lb (100 kg)	Jr	Cochran, Georgia
G	22	Elijah Wilson	6 ft 4 in (1.93 m)	205 lb (93 kg)	Sr	Wilmington, North Carolina
C	32	Josh Coleman	6 ft 9 in (2.06 m)	240 lb (109 kg)	So	Alpharetta, Georgia
G	45	Colton Ray-St Cyr	6 ft 5 in (1.96 m)	195 lb (88 kg)	Sr	Williamsburg, Virginia

Head coach

- Cliff Ellis (Florida State)

Assistant coach(es)

- Benny Moss (Charlotte)
- Stacey Palmore (Livingstone)
- Patrick Blake (Louisville)
- Matt Hurt (Alice Lloyd)

Legend

- (C) Team captain
- (S) Suspended
- (I) Ineligible
- (W) Walk-on
- Injured
- Current redshirt

Roster
Last update: 11-17-16

== Schedule and results ==
Date time, TV	Rank^{#}	Opponent^{#}	Result	Record	Site (attendance) city, state
Non-conference regular season
11/11/2016*; 9:00 pm, SECN		at Alabama; Men Who Speak Up Main Event	L 53–70	0–1	Coleman Coliseum (14,579); Tuscaloosa, AL
11/14/2016*; 7:00 pm		College of Charleston	L 64–71	0–2	HTC Center (2,325); Conway, SC
11/16/2016*; 7:00 pm		Coppin State; Men Who Speak Up Main Event	W 89–59	1–2	HTC Center (1,754); Conway, SC
11/19/2016*; 9:30 pm		at BYU; Men Who Speak Up Main Event	L 65–81	1–3	Marriott Center (15,003); Provo, UT
11/21/2016*; 6:00 pm		vs. Southern Utah; Men Who Speak Up Main Event	W 83–68	2–3	MGM Grand Garden Arena; Paradise, NV
11/23/2016*; 7:30 pm, ACCN Extra		at Wake Forest	L 74–86	2–4	LJVM Coliseum (6,867); Winston-Salem, NC
11/29/2016*; 7:00 pm		Chattanooga	L 52–68	2–5	HTC Center; Conway, SC
11/30/2016*; 8:30 pm		Methodist	W 88–59	3–5	HTC Center (1,340); Conway, SC
12/03/2016*; 2:00 pm		UNC Asheville	L 77–79 ^{OT}	3–6	HTC Center (1,447); Conway, SC
12/05/2016*; 7:00 pm		Piedmont International	W 100–63	4–6	HTC Center (527); Conway, SC
12/10/2016*; 2:00 pm		North Carolina Central	W 70–67	5–6	HTC Center (1,907); Conway, SC
12/15/2016*; 9:00 pm		at Auburn	L 72–117	5–7	Auburn Arena (7,333); Auburn, AL
12/19/2016*; 7:00 pm		Wofford	L 74–75	5–8	HTC Center (1,486); Conway, SC
Sun Belt Conference regular season
12/31/2016; 5:30 pm		at Texas–Arlington	L 69–90	5–9 (0–1)	College Park Center (1,892); Arlington, TX
01/02/2017; 8:00 pm		at Texas State	W 60–53	6–9 (1–1)	Strahan Coliseum (1,209); San Marcos, TX
01/07/2017; 4:30 pm		Arkansas State	W 80–65	7–9 (2–1)	HTC Center (1,463); Conway, SC
01/09/2017; 7:00 pm, ASN		Little Rock	W 66–63	8–9 (3–1)	HTC Center (1,292); Conway, SC
01/14/2017; 4:30 pm		Appalachian State	W 85–73	9–9 (4–1)	HTC Center (1,950); Conway, SC
01/21/2017; 2:15 pm, ESPN3		at Georgia State	L 56–76	9–10 (4–2)	GSU Sports Arena (1,479); Atlanta, GA
01/23/2017; 7:00 pm, ESPN3		at Georgia Southern	L 80–91	9–11 (4–3)	Hanner Fieldhouse (1,527); Statesboro, GA
01/28/2017; 4:30 pm		Texas State	L 50–52	9–12 (4–4)	HTC Center (2,070); Conway, SC
01/30/2017; 7:00 pm		Texas–Arlington	W 72–70	10–12 (5–4)	HTC Center (1,701); Conway, SC
02/04/2017; 7:00 pm		at Little Rock	W 82–75	11–12 (6–4)	Jack Stephens Center (2,870); Little Rock, AR
02/06/2017; 8:00 pm, ESPN3		at Arkansas State	L 57–67	11–13 (6–5)	Convocation Center (2,870); Jonesboro, AR
02/11/2017; 4:30 pm		Georgia Southern	W 82–70	12–13 (7–5)	HTC Center (2,050); Conway, SC
02/13/2017; 7:00 pm		Georgia State	W 65–64	13–13 (8–5)	HTC Center (2,061); Conway, SC
02/18/2017; 5:15 pm, ESPN3		at Troy	L 78–87	13–14 (8–6)	Trojan Arena (1,288); Troy, AL
02/20/2017; 8:05 pm		at South Alabama	W 81–77 ^{OT}	14–14 (9–6)	Mitchell Center (1,605); Mobile, AL
02/25/2017; 4:30 pm		Louisiana–Lafayette	L 77–79	14–15 (9–7)	HTC Center (1,512); Conway, SC
02/27/2017; 7:00 pm		Louisiana–Monroe	W 77–72	15–15 (10–7)	HTC Center (1,555); Conway, SC
03/04/2017; 3:30 pm, ESPN3		at Appalachian State	L 73–77	15–16 (10–8)	Holmes Center (2,073); Boone, NC
Sun Belt tournament
03/08/2017; 12:30 pm, ESPN3	(8)	vs. (9) South Alabama; First round	W 80–67	16–16	Lakefront Arena (1,045); New Orleans, LA
03/10/2017; 12:30 pm, ESPN3	(8)	vs. (1) Texas–Arlington; Quarterfinals	L 51–74	16–17	Lakefront Arena; New Orleans, LA
CBI
03/15/2017*; 7:00 pm		Hampton; First Round	W 83–67	17–17	HTC Center; Conway, SC
03/20/2017*; 7:00 pm		Loyola (MD); Quarterfinals	W 72–63	18–17	HTC Center; Conway, SC
03/22/2017*; 7:00 pm		UIC; Semifinals	W 89–78	19–17	HTC Center; Conway, SC
03/27/2017*; 8:30 pm, ESPNU		Wyoming; Finals – Game 1	W 91–81	20–17	HTC Center (1,583); Conway, SC
03/29/2017*; 8:30 pm, ESPNU		at Wyoming; Finals – Game 2	L 57–81	20–18	Arena-Auditorium (3,811); Laramie, WY
03/31/2017*; 7:00 pm, ESPNU		at Wyoming; Finals – Game 3	L 59–83	20–19	Arena-Auditorium (6,321); Laramie, WY
*Non-conference game. ^{#}Rankings from AP Poll. (#) Tournament seedings in parentheses. All times are in Eastern Time.
