= 2016–17 UT Arlington Mavericks men's basketball team =

American college basketball season

2016–17 UT Arlington Mavericks men's basketball

Sun Belt regular season champions

NIT, Quarterfinals
- Conference: Sun Belt Conference
- Record: 27–9 (14–4 Sun Belt)
- Head coach: Scott Cross (11th season)
- Assistant coaches: Greg Young; Zak Buncik; Kenneth Mangrum
- Home arena: College Park Center

2016–17 Sun Belt Conference men's basketball standings
	Conf.				Overall
Team	W		L	PCT	W		L	PCT
Texas–Arlington	14	–	4	.778	27	–	9	.750
Georgia State	12	–	6	.667	20	–	13	.606
Arkansas State	11	–	7	.611	20	–	12	.625
Texas State	11	–	7	.611	22	–	14	.611
Georgia Southern	11	–	7	.611	18	–	15	.545
Louisiana–Lafayette	10	–	8	.556	21	–	12	.636
Troy †	10	–	8	.556	22	–	15	.595
Coastal Carolina	10	–	8	.556	20	–	19	.513
South Alabama	7	–	11	.389	14	–	18	.438
Little Rock	6	–	12	.333	15	–	17	.469
Appalachian State	4	–	14	.222	9	–	21	.300
Louisiana–Monroe	2	–	16	.111	9	–	24	.273
† 2017 Sun Belt Conference tournament winner

The 2016–17 UT Arlington Mavericks men's basketball team represented the University of Texas at Arlington during the 2016–17 NCAA Division I men's basketball season. The Mavericks, led by 11th-year head coach Scott Cross, played their home games at the College Park Center as members of the Sun Belt Conference. They finished the season 27–9, 14–4 in Sun Belt play to win the Sun Belt regular season championship. In the Sun Belt tournament, they defeated Coastal Carolina before losing in the semifinals to Texas State. As a regular season conference champions who failed to win their conference tournament, they received an automatic bid to the National Invitation Tournament where they defeated BYU and Akron before losing in the quarterfinals to Cal State Bakersfield.

== Previous season ==
The Mavericks finished the 2015–16 season 24–11, 13–7 in Sun Belt play to finish in third place. They defeated Texas State in the semifinals of the Sun Belt tournament before losing to Louisiana–Monroe. They were invited to the CollegeInsider.com Tournament where they defeated Savannah State in the first round (the Mavericks' first ever post-season tournament win). They received a second-round bye and lost in the quarterfinals to NJIT.

== Roster ==
2016–17 Texas–Arlington Mavericks men's basketball team
Players
Coaches

Pos.	#	Name	Height	Weight	Year	Hometown
G	1	Erick Neal	5 ft 10 in (1.78 m)	155 lb (70 kg)	Jr	Dallas, Texas
G	2	D. J. Bryant	5 ft 11 in (1.8 m)	180 lb (82 kg)	Fr	Sarasota, Florida
G	3	Nathan Hawkins	6 ft 5 in (1.96 m)	205 lb (93 kg)	Jr	Garland, Texas
G	4	Drew Charles	6 ft 2 in (1.88 m)	193 lb (88 kg)	Sr	Azle, Texas
G	5	Kaelon Wilson	6 ft 2 in (1.88 m)	192 lb (87 kg)	Jr	Lancaster, Texas
G	10	Jalen Jones	6 ft 2 in (1.88 m)	209 lb (95 kg)	Sr	Cedar Hill, Texas
F	13	Erkam Kiris	6 ft 8 in (2.03 m)	209 lb (95 kg)	Fr	Istanbul, Turkey
F	15	Scott Muirhead	6 ft 3 in (1.91 m)	206 lb (93 kg)	RS Fr	Ennis, Texas
F	20	Julian Harris	6 ft 5 in (1.96 m)	235 lb (107 kg)	Jr	Mansfield, Texas
C	22	Link Kabadyundi	7 ft 1 in (2.16 m)	274 lb (124 kg)	Jr	Montreal, Quebec, Canada
G	23	Mairega Clarke	6 ft 5 in (1.96 m)	184 lb (83 kg)	Sr	Queens, New York
F	25	Kevin Hervey	6 ft 9 in (2.06 m)	230 lb (104 kg)	Jr	Arlington, Texas
G	30	Patrick Binzer	6 ft 2 in (1.88 m)	183 lb (83 kg)	Fr	Weatherford, Texas
F	34	Faith Pope	6 ft 8 in (2.03 m)	195 lb (88 kg)	Sr	Mount Pleasant, Iowa
F	45	Jorge Bilbao	6 ft 9 in (2.06 m)	245 lb (111 kg)	Sr	Bilbao, Biscay, Spain

Head coach

- Scott Cross (Texas–Arlington)

Assistant coach(es)

- Greg Young (Howard Payne)
- Zak Buncik (Texas–Arlington)
- Kenneth Mangrum (North Texas)

Legend

- (C) Team captain
- (S) Suspended
- (I) Ineligible
- (W) Walk-on
- Injured
- Current redshirt

Roster

== Schedule and results ==
Date time, TV	Rank^{#}	Opponent^{#}	Result	Record	Site (attendance) city, state
Non-conference regular season
11/12/2016*; 7:30 pm		Texas Southern	W 89-82	1–0	College Park Center (4,532); Arlington, TX
11/14/2016; 7:00 pm, BTN+		Minnesota; Golden Gopher Showcase	L 67–84	1–1	Williams Arena (7,986); Minneapolis, MN
11/16/2016*; 6:00 pm		at Florida Gulf Coast	L 72–85	1–2	Alico Arena (4,415); Fort Myers, FL
11/18/2016*; 6:00 pm, SECN+		at Arkansas; Golden Gopher Showcase	L 67–71	1–3	Bud Walton Arena (13,587); Fayetteville, AR
11/21/2016*; 7:00 pm		St. Francis (IL); Golden Gopher Showcase	W 88–67	2–3	College Park Center (1,301); Arlington, TX
11/23/2016*; 7:00 pm		Mount St. Mary's; Golden Gopher Showcase	W 80–71	3–3	College Park Center (1,360); Arlington, TX
11/26/2016*; 7:00 pm		at Fordham	W 67–63	4–3	Rose Hill Gymnasium (1,096); Bronx, NY
11/29/2016*; 7:00 pm, LHN		at Texas	W 72–61	5–3	Frank Erwin Center (9,812); Austin, TX
12/03/2016*; 2:00 pm		at North Texas	W 77–61	6–3	The Super Pit (2,386); Denton, TX
12/05/2016*; 7:00 pm		UT Dallas	W 99–49	7–3	College Park Center; Arlington, TX
12/08/2016*; 9:00 pm, TheW.tv		at No. 12 Saint Mary's	W 65–51	8–3	McKeon Pavilion (2,893); Moraga, CA
12/16/2016*; 7:00 pm, ESPN3		at Bradley	W 56–51	9–3	Carver Arena (4,711); Peoria, IL
12/22/2016*; 7:00 pm		at Loyola Marymount	W 80–77	10–3	Gersten Pavilion (1,327); Los Angeles, CA
Sun Belt Conference regular season
12/31/2016; 4:30 pm		Coastal Carolina	W 90–69	11–3 (1–0)	College Park Center (1,892); Arlington, TX
01/02/2017; 7:00 pm, SPEC		Appalachian State	W 84–69	12–3 (2–0)	College Park Center (1,320); Arlington, TX
01/07/2017; 4:30 pm, SPEC		at Texas State	L 73–81	12–4 (2–1)	Strahan Coliseum (1,667); San Marcos, TX
01/14/2017; 4:15 pm, ESPN3		at Troy	L 71–93	12–5 (2–2)	Trojan Arena (1,298); Troy, AL
01/16/2017; 7:00 pm		at South Alabama	W 89–83	13–5 (3–2)	Mitchell Center (1,949); Mobile, AL
01/21/2017; 4:30 pm, ESPN3		Louisiana–Monroe	W 71–55	14–5 (4–2)	College Park Center (2,659); Arlington, TX
01/23/2017; 7:00 pm, ASN		Louisiana–Lafayette	W 108–71	15–5 (5–2)	College Park Center (1,933); Arlington, TX
01/28/2017; 2:30 pm, ESPN3		at Appalachian State	W 83–67	16–5 (6–2)	Holmes Center (2,639); Boone, NC
01/30/2017; 6:00 pm		at Coastal Carolina	L 70–72	16–6 (6–3)	HTC Center (1,701); Conway, SC
02/04/2017; 4:30 pm, SPEC		Texas State	W 76–61	17–6 (7–3)	College Park Center (3,483); Arlington, TX
02/11/2017; 4:30 pm		Arkansas State	W 81–75	18–6 (8–3)	College Park Center (2,737); Arlington, TX
02/13/2017; 7:00 pm, ASN/ESPN3		Little Rock	W 71–55	19–6 (9–3)	College Park Center (1,591); Arlington, TX
02/18/2017; 1:15 pm, ESPN3		at Georgia State	W 68–67	20–6 (10–3)	GSU Sports Arena (1,800); Atlanta, GA
02/20/2017; 6:00 pm, ASN		at Georgia Southern	W 81–71	21–6 (11–3)	Hanner Fieldhouse (2,573); Statesboro, GA
02/25/2017; 4:30 pm		South Alabama	W 86–75	22–6 (12–3)	College Park Center (2,878); Arlington, TX
02/27/2017; 7:00 pm, SPEC		Troy	W 82–67	23–6 (13–3)	College Park Center (3,111); Arlington, TX
03/02/2017; 7:00 pm		at Louisiana–Monroe	W 72–57	24–6 (14–3)	Fant–Ewing Coliseum (1,669); Monroe, LA
03/04/2017; 7:15 pm, ESPN3		at Louisiana–Lafayette	L 81–83	24–7 (14–4)	Cajundome (4,272); Lafayette, LA
Sun Belt tournament
03/10/2017; 11:30 am, ESPN3	(1)	vs. (8) Coastal Carolina; Quarterfinals	W 74–51	25–7	Lakefront Arena; New Orleans, LA
03/11/2017; 11:30 am, ESPN3	(1)	vs. (4) Texas State; Semifinals	L 62–83	25–8	Lakefront Arena; New Orleans, LA
NIT
03/15/2017*; 8:30 pm, ESPN2	(6)	at (3) BYU; First Round – California Bracket	W 105–89	26–8	Marriott Center (7,247); Provo, UT
03/20/2017*; 7:00 pm, ESPNU	(6)	(7) Akron; Second Round – California Bracket	W 85–69	27–8	College Park Center (5,390); Arlington, TX
03/22/2017*; 8:00 pm, ESPNU	(6)	(8) Cal State Bakersfield; Quarterfinals – California Bracket	L 76–80	27–9	College Park Center (6,336); Arlington, TX
*Non-conference game. ^{#}Rankings from AP Poll. (#) Tournament seedings in parentheses. All times are in Central Time Source.
