= 2016–17 Louisiana–Lafayette Ragin' Cajuns men's basketball team =

American college basketball season

2016–17 Louisiana Ragin' Cajuns men's basketball
- Conference: Sun Belt Conference
- Record: 21–12 (10–8 Sun Belt)
- Head coach: Bob Marlin (7th season)
- Assistant coaches: Neil Hardin; Kevin Johnson; Josten Crow
- Home arena: Cajundome; Blackham Coliseum

2016–17 Sun Belt Conference men's basketball standings
	Conf.				Overall
Team	W		L	PCT	W		L	PCT
Texas–Arlington	14	–	4	.778	27	–	9	.750
Georgia State	12	–	6	.667	20	–	13	.606
Arkansas State	11	–	7	.611	20	–	12	.625
Texas State	11	–	7	.611	22	–	14	.611
Georgia Southern	11	–	7	.611	18	–	15	.545
Louisiana–Lafayette	10	–	8	.556	21	–	12	.636
Troy †	10	–	8	.556	22	–	15	.595
Coastal Carolina	10	–	8	.556	20	–	19	.513
South Alabama	7	–	11	.389	14	–	18	.438
Little Rock	6	–	12	.333	15	–	17	.469
Appalachian State	4	–	14	.222	9	–	21	.300
Louisiana–Monroe	2	–	16	.111	9	–	24	.273
† 2017 Sun Belt Conference tournament winner

The 2016–17 Louisiana Ragin' Cajuns men's basketball team represented the University of Louisiana at Lafayette during the 2016–17 NCAA Division I men's basketball season. The Ragin' Cajuns were led by seventh-year head coach Bob Marlin and played their home games at the Cajundome, with four home games at Blackham Coliseum, as members in the Sun Belt Conference. They finished the season 21–12, 10–8 in Sun Belt play to finish in a three-way tie for sixth place. They defeated Little Rock before losing to Georgia State in the quarterfinals of the Sun Belt tournament. Despite having 21 wins, they did not participate in a postseason tournament.

== Previous season ==
The Ragin' Cajuns finished the 2015–16 season 19–15, 12–8 in Sun Belt play to finish in fourth place. They beat South Alabama in the quarterfinals of the Sun Belt tournament before losing to Little Rock in the semifinals. They were invited to the CollegeInsider.com Tournament where they defeated Texas A&M–Corpus Christi and Furman before losing in the quarterfinals to UC Irvine.

== Roster ==
2016–17 Louisiana–Lafayette Ragin' Cajuns men's basketball team
Players
Coaches

Pos.	#	Name	Height	Weight	Year	Hometown
G	1	Jay Wright	6 ft 1 in (1.85 m)	170 lb (77 kg)	Sr	Rincon, Georgia
F	3	Justin Miller	6 ft 7 in (2.01 m)	251 lb (114 kg)	Fr	Owensboro, Kentucky
G	4	Frank Bartley	6 ft 3 in (1.91 m)	214 lb (97 kg)	Jr	Baton Rouge, Louisiana
G	5	Kadavion Evans	5 ft 11 in (1.8 m)	160 lb (73 kg)	RS Fr	Shreveport, Louisiana
F	11	Jerekius Davis	6 ft 6 in (1.98 m)	222 lb (101 kg)	RS Fr	Jackson, Mississippi
G	13	Jacob Broussard	5 ft 10 in (1.78 m)	164 lb (74 kg)	Jr	Lafayette, Louisiana
G	15	P.J. Hardy	6 ft 1 in (1.85 m)	170 lb (77 kg)	Fr	Lake Charles, Louisiana
G	22	Johnathan Stove	6 ft 4 in (1.93 m)	224 lb (102 kg)	Jr	Baton Rouge, Louisiana
G	23	Jordan Adebutu	6 ft 2 in (1.88 m)	189 lb (86 kg)	Fr	Baton Rouge, Louisiana
F	25	Roydell Brown	6 ft 5 in (1.96 m)	184 lb (83 kg)	Fr	New Orleans, Louisiana
G	31	Mason Aucoin	6 ft 4 in (1.93 m)	172 lb (78 kg)	Fr	Luling, Louisiana
F	32	Bryce Washington	6 ft 6 in (1.98 m)	245 lb (111 kg)	Jr	New Orleans, Louisiana
C	33	Larenz Stalcup	6 ft 11 in (2.11 m)	233 lb (106 kg)	Jr	Colorado Springs, Colorado
F	55	Scott Plaisance	6 ft 9 in (2.06 m)	217 lb (98 kg)	So	New Orleans, Louisiana
F		JaKeenan Gant (redshirt)	6 ft 8 in (2.03 m)	205 lb (93 kg)	Jr	Springfield, Georgia
G		Malik Marquetti (redshirt)	6 ft 6 in (1.98 m)	191 lb (87 kg)	Jr	Compton, California
G		Marcus Stroman (redshirt)	6 ft 0 in (1.83 m)	183 lb (83 kg)	Jr	Columbia, South Carolina

Head coach

- Bob Marlin (Mississippi State)

Assistant coach(es)

- Neil Hardin (West Florida)
- Kevin Johnson (Texas–Pan American)
- Josten Crow (Sam Houston State)

Legend

- (C) Team captain
- (S) Suspended
- (I) Ineligible
- (W) Walk-on
- Injured
- Current redshirt

Roster

== Schedule and results ==
Date time, TV	Rank^{#}	Opponent^{#}	Result	Record	High points	High rebounds	High assists	Site (attendance) city, state
Exhibition
11/03/2016*; 7:00 pm		West Florida	W 94–72		25 – Washington	12 – Washington	5 – Bartley	Blackham Coliseum (1,242); Lafayette, Louisiana
Non-conference regular season
11/11/2016*; 7:00 pm		at Minnesota	L 74–86	0–1	21 – Miller	10 – Washington	3 – Bartley	Williams Arena (8,453); Minneapolis, Minnesota
11/14/2016*; 8:00 pm		at Montana State	L 83–84	0–2	29 – Bartley	8 – Washington	4 – Wright	Brick Breeden Fieldhouse (2,395); Bozeman, Montana
11/17/2016*; 7:00 pm		Panhandle State	W 117–47	1–2	20 – Washington	13 – Washington	5 – Evans	Blackham Coliseum (1,067); Lafayette, Louisiana
11/21/2016*; 7:00 pm		Delaware State	W 83–82	2–2	25 – Bartley	14 – Washington	5 – Bartley	Blackham Coliseum (1,822); Lafayette, Louisiana
11/23/2016*; 3:00 pm		at James Madison	W 82–70	3–2	28 – Bartley	12 – Washington	6 – Wright	JMU Convocation Center (2,200); Harrisonburg, Virginia
11/27/2016*; 4:00 pm		Texas Southern	W 84–73	4–2	22 – Washington	14 – Miller	4 – Wright	Blackham Coliseum (3,027); Lafayette, Louisiana
12/01/2016*; 7:10 pm		Nicholls State	W 101–69	5–2	19 – Bartley	10 – Washington	5 – Wright	Cajundome (4,982); Lafayette, Louisiana
12/03/2016*; 1:00 pm		at McNeese State	W 92–72	6–2	28 – Wright	15 – Washington	5 – Wright	Burton Coliseum (1,500); Lake Charles, Louisiana
12/07/2016*; 7:00 pm		Loyola	W 94–60	7–2	19 – Bartley	10 – Washington	5 – Wright	Cajundome (3,544); Lafayette, Louisiana
12/10/2016*; 7:15 pm		Louisiana Tech	W 91–83	8–2	19 – Washington	10 – Washington	5 – Wright	Cajundome (4,491); Lafayette, Louisiana
12/14/2016*; 5:00 pm, SECN		at Georgia	L 60–73	8–3	17 – Miller	18 – Washington	4 – Wright	Stegeman Coliseum (5,125); Athens, Georgia
12/17/2016*; 6:00 pm		at New Orleans	W 76–71	9–3	27 – Wright	14 – Washington	4 – Wright	Lakefront Arena (1,411); New Orleans, Louisiana
12/20/2016*; 7:00 pm		Pepperdine	W 90–64	10–3	19 – Washington	10 – Washington	4 – Stove	Cajundome (3,582); Lafayette, Louisiana
Sun Belt regular season
12/31/2016; 7:00 pm		at Arkansas State	L 71–74	10–4 (0–1)	16 – Miller	11 – Washington	4 – Wright	Convocation Center (2,056); Jonesboro, Arkansas
01/02/2017; 6:30 pm		at Little Rock	W 69–52	11–4 (1–1)	15 – Miller	11 – Washington	6 – Wright	Jack Stephens Center (3,739); Little Rock, Arkansas
01/07/2017; 7:15 pm		Louisiana–Monroe	W 69–60	12–4 (2–1)	16 – Wright	21 – Washington	4 – Wright	Cajundome (4,714); Lafayette, Louisiana
01/14/2017; 7:15 pm		Georgia Southern	L 76–81	12–5 (2–2)	21 – Wright	12 – Washington	3 – Bartley	Cajundome (5,464); Lafayette, Louisiana
01/16/2017; 8:00 pm		Georgia State	L 86–101	12–6 (2–3)	19 – Bartley	10 – Washington	2 – Miller	Cajundome (3,497); Lafayette, Louisiana
01/21/2017; 4:30 pm		at Texas State	W 79–73	13–6 (3–3)	23 – Wright	10 – Washington	3 – Wright	Strahan Coliseum (2,826); San Marcos, Texas
01/23/2017; 8:00 pm, ASN		at Texas–Arlington	L 71–108	13–7 (3–4)	17 – Washington	10 – Washington	4 – Wright	College Park Center (1,933); Arlington, Texas
01/28/2017; 7:15 pm		Little Rock	W 88–82	14–7 (4–4)	20 – Bartley	9 – Miller	7 – Miller	Cajundome (3,812); Lafayette, Louisiana
01/30/2017; 7:00 pm		Arkansas State	L 69–88	14–8 (4–5)	18 – Bartley	9 – Davis	8 – Bartley	Cajundome (3,230); Lafayette, Louisiana
02/04/2017; 1:15 pm, ESPN3		at Georgia State	L 82–85	14–9 (4–6)	31 – Bartley	11 – Washington	7 – Wright	GSU Sports Arena (1,951); Atlanta, Georgia
02/06/2017; 6:00 pm		at Georgia Southern	L 70–74	14–10 (4–7)	18 – Miller	15 – Washington	5 – Stove	Hanner Fieldhouse (1,373); Statesboro, Georgia
02/11/2017; 7:15 pm, ESPN3		Troy	L 88–100	14–11 (4–8)	26 – Wright	8 – Washington	6 – Wright	Cajundome (3,822); Lafayette, Louisiana
02/13/2017; 7:00 pm		South Alabama	W 87–61	15–11 (5–8)	25 – Washington	13 – Washington	6 – Wright	Cajundome (3,179); Lafayette, Louisiana
02/18/2017; 4:00 pm, ESPN3		at Louisiana–Monroe	W 85–84	16–11 (6–8)	28 – Wright	7 – Miller	4 – Bartley	Fant–Ewing Coliseum (2,451); Monroe, Louisiana
02/25/2017; 3:30 pm		at Coastal Carolina	W 79	17–11 (7–8)	19 – Bartley	11 – Washington	4 – Washington	HTC Center (1,512); Conway, South Carolina
02/27/2017; 6:00 pm, ESPN3		at Appalachian State	W 77–62	18–11 (8–8)	21 – Bartley	12 – Washington	6 – Wright	Holmes Center (1,140); Boone, North Carolina
03/02/2017; 7:15 pm		Texas State	W 94–84 ^{OT}	19–11 (9–8)	21 – Wright	14 – Washington	4 – Washington	Cajundome (3,427); Lafayette, Louisiana
03/04/2017; 7:15 pm, ESPN3		Texas–Arlington	W 83–81	20–11 (10–8)	22 – Bartley	15 – Washington	5 – Wright	Cajundome (4,272); Lafayette, Louisiana
Sun Belt tournament
03/08/2017; 5:00 pm, ESPN3	(7)	vs. (10) Little Rock; First Round	W 78–71	21–11	24 – Wright	9 – Washington	3 – Miller	Lakefront Arena; New Orleans, Louisiana
03/10/2017; 5:00 pm, ESPN3	(7)	vs. (2) Georgia State; Quarterfinals	L 76–86	21–12	27 – Wright	8 – Tied	3 – Bartley	Lakefront Arena; New Orleans, Louisiana
*Non-conference game. ^{#}Rankings from AP Poll. (#) Tournament seedings in parentheses. All times are in Central Time.
