= 2016–17 South Alabama Jaguars men's basketball team =

American college basketball season

2016–17 South Alabama Jaguars men's basketball
- Conference: Sun Belt Conference
- Record: 14–18 (7–11 Sun Belt)
- Head coach: Matthew Graves (4th season)
- Assistant coaches: Darnell Archey; Russ Willemsen; Brock Morris
- Home arena: Mitchell Center

2016–17 Sun Belt Conference men's basketball standings
	Conf.				Overall
Team	W		L	PCT	W		L	PCT
Texas–Arlington	14	–	4	.778	27	–	9	.750
Georgia State	12	–	6	.667	20	–	13	.606
Arkansas State	11	–	7	.611	20	–	12	.625
Texas State	11	–	7	.611	22	–	14	.611
Georgia Southern	11	–	7	.611	18	–	15	.545
Louisiana–Lafayette	10	–	8	.556	21	–	12	.636
Troy †	10	–	8	.556	22	–	15	.595
Coastal Carolina	10	–	8	.556	20	–	19	.513
South Alabama	7	–	11	.389	14	–	18	.438
Little Rock	6	–	12	.333	15	–	17	.469
Appalachian State	4	–	14	.222	9	–	21	.300
Louisiana–Monroe	2	–	16	.111	9	–	24	.273
† 2017 Sun Belt Conference tournament winner

The 2016–17 South Alabama Jaguars men's basketball team represented the University of South Alabama during the 2016–17 NCAA Division I men's basketball season. The Jaguars were led by fourth-year head coach Matthew Graves and played their home games at the Mitchell Center in Mobile, Alabama as members in the Sun Belt Conference. They finished the season 14–18, 7–11 in Sun Belt play to finish in ninth place. They lost in the first round of the Sun Belt tournament to Coastal Carolina.

== Previous season ==
The Jaguars finished the 2015–16 season 14–19, 8–12 in Sun Belt play to finish in a tie for seventh place. They defeated Georgia Southern in the first round of the Sun Belt tournament to advance to the quarterfinals before losing to Louisiana–Lafayette.

== Off-season ==
=== Departures ===
Name	Pos.	Height	Weight	Year	Hometown	Notes
Josh Brown	G	6'4"	200	Senior	Charlotte, North Carolina	Graduated
Barrington Stevens	G	5'11"	182	Senior	Allen, Texas	Graduated
Tafari Whittingham	F	6'8"	215	Junior	Brooklyn, New York	Transferred to Central Connecticut State.
Lance Crawford	G	5'10"	170	Sophomore	Davie, Florida	Transferred to Indian Hills CC
Taishaun Johnson	G	6'0"	172	Sophomore	Indianapolis, Indiana	Transferred to Kent State.

=== Incoming transfers ===
Name	Number	Pos.	Height	Weight	Year	Hometown	Previous School
Dederick Lee	5	G	6'0"	162	Junior	Clarksville, Arkansas	Junior college transferred from Indian Hills CC
Jordan Andrews		G	6'4"	180	Sophomore	Abita Springs, Louisiana	Transferred from Youngstown State. Under NCAA transfer rules, Andrews will have to sit out for the 2016–17 season. Will have three years of remaining eligibility.

=== Incoming recruits ===
College recruiting information
Name	Hometown	School	Height	Weight	Commit date
Herb McGee; PG	Reserve, Louisiana	Reserve Academy	6 ft 1 in (1.85 m)	195 lb (88 kg)	
Herb McGee; PG	Recruit ratings: Scout: Rivals: (NR)				
Kevin Morris; PF	Dothan, Alabama	Dothan HS	6 ft 8 in (2.03 m)	265 lb (120 kg)	
Kevin Morris; PF	Recruit ratings: Scout: Rivals: (NR)				
John Pettway; PG	Safford, Alabama	Keith HS	6 ft 1 in (1.85 m)	180 lb (82 kg)	
John Pettway; PG	Recruit ratings: Scout: Rivals: (NR)				
Overall recruit ranking:
Note: In many cases, Scout, Rivals, 247Sports, On3, and ESPN may conflict in their listings of height and weight.; In these cases, the average was taken. ESPN grades are on a 100-point scale.; Sources: "2016 Team Ranking". Rivals.

== Roster ==
2016–17 South Alabama Jaguars men's basketball team
Players
Coaches

Pos.	#	Name	Height	Weight	Year	Previous school	Hometown
G		Jordan Andrews (I) (redshirt)	6 ft 4 in (1.93 m)	180 lb (82 kg)	So	Youngstown State	Abita Springs, Louisiana
G	0	Shaq Calhoun	6 ft 4 in (1.93 m)	195 lb (88 kg)	Jr	Iowa Western CC	Rome, Georgia
G	1	Ken Williams	6 ft 3 in (1.91 m)	198 lb (90 kg)	Sr	Episcopal HS	Houston, Texas
G	2	Herb McGee	6 ft 1 in (1.85 m)	195 lb (88 kg)	Fr	Riverside Academy	Reserve, Louisiana
G	3	Ethan Haslam	6 ft 1 in (1.85 m)	182 lb (83 kg)	RS Fr	Academy at the Lakes	Lithia, Florida
G	5	Dederick Lee	6 ft 0 in (1.83 m)	162 lb (73 kg)	Jr	Indian Hills CC	Clarksville, Arkansas
F	10	Georgi Boyanov	6 ft 7 in (2.01 m)	205 lb (93 kg)	Sr	General Vladimir Stoychev SS	Lovech, BG
F	11	Nikola Marijan	7 ft 1 in (2.16 m)	242 lb (110 kg)	So	Borislav Petrov Braca	Bački Brestovac, RS
G	14	Devin Epps (redshirt)	5 ft 11 in (1.8 m)	167 lb (76 kg)	Jr	Oakland HS	Murfreesboro, Tennessee
F	20	Kevin Morris	6 ft 8 in (2.03 m)	265 lb (120 kg)	Fr	Dothan HS	Dothan, Alabama
G	21	Nick Davis	6 ft 6 in (1.98 m)	191 lb (87 kg)	Jr	Alabama State	Mount Vernon, Alabama
G	22	John Pettway (redshirt)	6 ft 1 in (1.85 m)	180 lb (82 kg)	Fr	Keith HS	Safford, Alabama
F	24	Nick Stover	6 ft 6 in (1.98 m)	198 lb (90 kg)	Sr	Loyola Marymount	Los Angeles, California
F	25	Dan MuepoKelly	6 ft 7 in (2.01 m)	236 lb (107 kg)	Sr	Riverside CC	Fontana, California
F	33	Josh Ajayi	6 ft 7 in (2.01 m)	244 lb (111 kg)	RS Fr	San Gabriel Academy	El Monte, California
F	42	Trhae Mitchell	6 ft 6 in (1.98 m)	189 lb (86 kg)	RS Fr	Pebblebrook HS	Austell, Georgia

Head coach

- Matthew Graves (Butler)

Assistant coach(es)

- Darnell Archey (Butler)
- Russ Willemsen (Lee)
- Brock Morris (Snead State CC)

Legend

- (C) Team captain
- (S) Suspended
- (I) Ineligible
- (W) Walk-on
- Injured
- Current redshirt

Roster

== Schedule and results ==
Date time, TV	Rank^{#}	Opponent^{#}	Result	Record	Site (attendance) city, state
Europe Tour
July 28, 2016*; Noon		vs. ISBL All-Stars	W 93–79		Madrid, Spain
Aug 1, 2016*; 10:00 am		vs. Catalan Amateur Talents	W 107–78		Barcelona, Spain
Aug 3, 2016*; 10:00 am		vs. KK Kolubura Lazarevac	W 80–68		Belgrade, Serbia
Exhibition
Nov 4, 2016*; 7:05 pm		Mobile	W 77–46		Mitchell Center (1,710); Mobile, Alabama
Non-conference regular season
Nov 11, 2016*; 9:00 pm		at UNLV	W 76–68	1–0	Thomas & Mack Center (9,981); Paradise, Nevada
Nov 14, 2016*; 7:05 pm		Blue Mountain	W 88–35	2–0	Mitchell Center (1,874); Mobile, Alabama
Nov 18, 2016*; 7:05 pm		FIU; Red Diamond Roundball Classic	W 69–64 ^{OT}	3–0	Mitchell Center (2,255); Mobile, Alabama
Nov 19, 2016*; 2:05 pm		Youngstown State; Red Diamond Roundball Classic	W 84–75	4–0	Mitchell Center (1,948); Mobile, Alabama
Nov 20, 2016*; 3:05 pm		Jacksonville; Red Diamond Roundball Classic	W 71–58	5–0	Mitchell Center (1,823); Mobile, Alabama
Nov 26, 2016*; 3:15 pm		at Eastern Illinois	L 62–72	5–1	Lantz Arena (835); Charleston, Illinois
Nov 30, 2016*; 7:00 pm		at Southern Miss	W 78–55	6–1	Reed Green Coliseum (2,333); Hattiesburg, Mississippi
Dec 3, 2016*; 7:05 pm		Middle Tennessee	L 55–67	6–2	Mitchell Center (2,612); Mobile, Alabama
Dec 10, 2016*; 6:00 pm, ESPN3		at Stetson	L 78–87	6–3	Edmunds Center (866); DeLand, Florida
Dec 13, 2016*; 7:05 pm		Denver	L 51–64	6–4	Mitchell Center (1,654); Mobile, Alabama
Dec 16, 2016*; 7:05 pm		Samford	L 79–82	6–5	Mitchell Center (1,925); Mobile, Alabama
Dec 19, 2016*; 7:35 pm		Spring Hill	W 71–50	7–5	Mitchell Center (2,601); Mobile, Alabama
Dec 22, 2016*; 8:00 pm, SECN		at Ole Miss	L 58–92	7–6	The Pavilion at Ole Miss (7,260); Oxford, Mississippi
Sun Belt regular season
Jan 1, 2017; 7:05 pm		Troy	W 76–75	8–6 (1–0)	Mitchell Center (1,609); Mobile, Alabama
Jan 7, 2017; 1:15 pm, ESPN3		at Georgia State	L 77–78	8–7 (1–1)	GSU Sports Arena (1,231); Atlanta, Georgia
Jan 9, 2017; 6:00 pm		at Georgia Southern	L 79–84 ^{OT}	8–8 (1–2)	Hanner Fieldhouse (1,391); Statesboro, Georgia
Jan 14, 2017; 3:05 pm		Texas State	W 72–67 ^{OT}	9–8 (2–2)	Mitchell Center (2,076); Mobile, Alabama
Jan 16, 2017; 7:05 pm, ESPN3		Texas–Arlington	L 83–89	9–9 (2–3)	Mitchell Center (1,949); Mobile, Alabama
Jan 21, 2017; 6:00 pm		at Little Rock	L 56–73	9–10 (2–4)	Jack Stephens Center (2,760); Little Rock, Arkansas
Jan 23, 2017; 7:00 pm, ESPN3		at Arkansas State	L 62–74	9–11 (2–5)	Convocation Center (4,440); Jonesboro, Arkansas
Jan 28, 2017; 7:05 pm, ESPN3		Georgia Southern	W 78–66	10–11 (3–5)	Mitchell Center (2,439); Mobile, Alabama
Jan 30, 2017; 7:05 pm, ASN		Georgia State	L 80–83	10–12 (3–6)	Mitchell Center (2,110); Mobile, Alabama
Feb 4, 2017; 4:15 pm, ESPN3		at Troy	W 76–71	11–12 (4–6)	Trojan Arena (2,221); Troy, Alabama
Feb 11, 2017; 4:00 pm		at Louisiana–Monroe	W 66–63	12–12 (5–6)	Fant–Ewing Coliseum (1,421); Monroe, Louisiana
Feb 13, 2017; 7:00 pm		at Louisiana–Lafayette	L 61–87	12–13 (5–7)	Cajundome (3,179); Lafayette, Louisiana
Feb 18, 2017; 7:05 pm		Appalachian State	W 87–74	13–13 (6–7)	Mitchell Center (2,786); Mobile, Alabama
Feb 20, 2017; 7:05 pm		Coastal Carolina	L 77–81 ^{OT}	13–14 (6–8)	Mitchell Center (1,605); Mobile, Alabama
Feb 25, 2017; 4:30 pm		at Texas–Arlington	L 75–86	13–15 (6–9)	College Park Center (2,878); Arlington, Texas
Feb 27, 2017; 7:00 pm		at Texas State	L 64–90	13–16 (6–10)	Strahan Coliseum (3,527); San Marcos, Texas
Mar 2, 2017; 7:05 pm		Little Rock	L 57–62	13–17 (6–11)	Mitchell Center (1,628); Mobile, Alabama
Mar 4, 2017; 3:05 pm		Arkansas State	W 73–70	14–17 (7–11)	Mitchell Center (1,838); Mobile, Alabama
Sun Belt tournament
Mar 8, 2017; 11:30 am, ESPN3	(9)	vs. (8) Coastal Carolina; First Round	L 67–80	14–18	Lakefront Arena (1,045); New Orleans, Louisiana
*Non-conference game. ^{#}Rankings from AP Poll. (#) Tournament seedings in parentheses. All times are in Central Time.

== See also ==
- 2016–17 South Alabama Jaguars women's basketball team
