= 2016–17 Appalachian State Mountaineers men's basketball team =

American college basketball season

2016–17 Appalachian State Mountaineers men's basketball
- Conference: Sun Belt Conference
- Record: 9–21 (4–14 Sun Belt)
- Head coach: Jim Fox (3rd season)
- Assistant coaches: Jason Allison; Bryan Lentz; Mantoris Robinson
- Home arena: George M. Holmes Convocation Center

2016–17 Sun Belt Conference men's basketball standings
	Conf.				Overall
Team	W		L	PCT	W		L	PCT
Texas–Arlington	14	–	4	.778	27	–	9	.750
Georgia State	12	–	6	.667	20	–	13	.606
Arkansas State	11	–	7	.611	20	–	12	.625
Texas State	11	–	7	.611	22	–	14	.611
Georgia Southern	11	–	7	.611	18	–	15	.545
Louisiana–Lafayette	10	–	8	.556	21	–	12	.636
Troy †	10	–	8	.556	22	–	15	.595
Coastal Carolina	10	–	8	.556	20	–	19	.513
South Alabama	7	–	11	.389	14	–	18	.438
Little Rock	6	–	12	.333	15	–	17	.469
Appalachian State	4	–	14	.222	9	–	21	.300
Louisiana–Monroe	2	–	16	.111	9	–	24	.273
† 2017 Sun Belt Conference tournament winner

The 2016–17 Appalachian State Mountaineers men's basketball team represented Appalachian State University during the 2016–17 NCAA Division I men's basketball season. The Mountaineers, led by third-year head coach Jim Fox, played their home games at the George M. Holmes Convocation Center in Boone, North Carolina as members of the Sun Belt Conference. They finished the season 9–21, 4–14 in Sun Belt play to finish in 11th place. They lost in the first round of the Sun Belt tournament to Troy.

== Previous season ==
The Mountaineers finished the 2015–16 season 9–22, 7–13 in Sun Belt play to finish in a tie for ninth place. They failed to qualify for the Sun Belt tournament.

== Roster ==
2016–17 Appalachian State Mountaineers men's basketball team
Players
Coaches

Pos.	#	Name	Height	Weight	Year	Hometown
F	0	Isaac Johnson	6 ft 9 in (2.06 m)	212 lb (96 kg)	Fr	Charlotte, North Carolina
G	1	Kelvin Robinson	6 ft 2 in (1.88 m)	218 lb (99 kg)	Fr	Little Rock, Arkansas
G	2	Ronshad Shabazz	6 ft 5 in (1.96 m)	217 lb (98 kg)	So	Raleigh, North Carolina
F	5	Griffin Kinney	6 ft 8 in (2.03 m)	240 lb (109 kg)	Jr	Delaware, Ohio
G	10	Patrick Good	6 ft 0 in (1.83 m)	162 lb (73 kg)	Fr	Johnson City, Tennessee
G	11	Emarius Logan	6 ft 2 in (1.88 m)	189 lb (86 kg)	So	Columbia, South Carolina
G	13	Kevin Kerley	6 ft 0 in (1.83 m)	178 lb (81 kg)	So	Loveland, Ohio
F	14	Bennett Holley	6 ft 8 in (2.03 m)	238 lb (108 kg)	So	Roanoke, Virginia
C	15	Jake Wilson	7 ft 1 in (2.16 m)	240 lb (109 kg)	RS So	Raleigh, North Carolina
G	20	Nick Hough	6 ft 4 in (1.93 m)	205 lb (93 kg)	RS So	Harrisburg, North Carolina
G	22	Matt O'Boyle	6 ft 5 in (1.96 m)	198 lb (90 kg)	Sr	Peoria, Arizona
G	23	Trey Ford	6 ft 0 in (1.83 m)	180 lb (82 kg)	So	Mooresville, North Carolina
F	24	Craig Hinton	6 ft 7 in (2.01 m)	203 lb (92 kg)	RS Jr	Winston-Salem, North Carolina
G	25	Jake Babic	6 ft 5 in (1.96 m)	190 lb (86 kg)	Jr	Oakville, Ontario, Canada
F	32	Tyrell Johnson	6 ft 8 in (2.03 m)	205 lb (93 kg)	So	Atlanta, Georgia
F	34	Zach Cottrell	6 ft 5 in (1.96 m)	205 lb (93 kg)	Fr	Hayesville, North Carolina

Head coach

- Jim Fox (SUNY Geneseo)

Assistant coach(es)

- Jason Allison (Liberty)
- Bryan Lentz (Lenoir–Rhyne)
- Mantoris Robinson (Winthrop)

Legend

- (C) Team captain
- (S) Suspended
- (I) Ineligible
- (W) Walk-on
- Injured
- Current redshirt

Roster

== Schedule and results ==
Date time, TV	Rank^{#}	Opponent^{#}	Result	Record	Site (attendance) city, state
Exhibition
11/08/2016*; 7:00 pm		Methodist	W 103–58		Holmes Center; Boone, NC
Non-conference regular season
11/12/2016*; 8:00 pm, TWCSC		at Davidson	L 74–86	0–1	John M. Belk Arena (4,598); Davidson, NC
11/15/2016*; 7:00 pm, SECN		at Tennessee	L 94–103	0–2	Thompson-Boling Arena (11,758); Knoxville, TN
11/17/2016*; 7:00 pm		Warren Wilson	W 119–51	1–2	Holmes Center (1,057); Boone, NC
11/23/2016*; 2:00 pm		at Hartford	W 70–61	2–2	Chase Arena at Reich Family Pavilion (704); Hartford, CT
11/26/2016*; 12:00 pm, ACCN Extra		at No. 6 Duke	L 58–93	2–3	Cameron Indoor Stadium (9,314); Durham, NC
11/28/2016*; 7:00 pm		at Charlotte	L 72–80	2–4	Dale F. Halton Arena (4,153); Charlotte, NC
12/03/2016*; 3:30 pm, ESPN3		Western Carolina	L 53-58	2-5	Holmes Center (2,497); Boone, NC
12/11/2016*; 2:00 pm		Montreat	W 116–57	3–5	Holmes Center (645); Boone, NC
12/15/2016*; 7:00 pm, ESPNU		at NC State	L 64–97	3–6	PNC Arena (16,417); Raleigh, NC
12/17/2016*; 1:00 pm		James Madison	W 73–61 ^{OT}	4–6	Holmes Center (422); Boone, NC
12/21/2016*; 7:00 pm		Hampton	W 88–67	5–6	Holmes Center (584); Boone, NC
Sun Belt Conference regular season
12/31/2016; 5:30 pm		at Texas State	L 58–67	5–7 (0–1)	Strahan Coliseum (1,318); San Marcos, TX
01/02/2017; 8:00 pm		at Texas–Arlington	L 69–84	5–8 (0–2)	College Park Center (1,320); Arlington, TX
01/07/2017; 3:30 pm		Little Rock	L 68–76	5–9 (0–3)	Holmes Center (536); Boone, NC
01/09/2017; 7:00 pm		Arkansas State	W 70–57	6–9 (1–3)	Holmes Center (522); Boone, NC
01/14/2017; 4:30 pm		at Coastal Carolina	L 73–85	6–10 (1–4)	HTC Center (1,950); Conway, SC
01/21/2017; 7:00 pm, ESPN3		at Georgia Southern	L 88–92	6–11 (1–5)	Hanner Fieldhouse (2,938); Statesboro, GA
01/23/2017; 5:00 pm, ESPN3		at Georgia State	L 72–83	6–12 (1–6)	GSU Sports Arena (1,418); Atlanta, GA
01/28/2017; 3:30 pm, ESPN3		Texas–Arlington	L 67–83	6–13 (1–7)	Holmes Center (2,639); Boone, NC
01/30/2017; 7:00 pm, ESPN3		Texas State	L 55–68	6–14 (1–8)	Holmes Center (1,123); Boone, NC
02/04/2017; 8:00 pm, ESPN3		at Arkansas State	L 78–79	6–15 (1–9)	Convocation Center (4,117); Jonesboro, AR
02/06/2017; 9:00 pm, ASN		at Little Rock	L 62–69	6–16 (1–10)	Jack Stephens Center (1,969); Little Rock, AR
02/11/2017; 3:30 pm, ESPN3		Georgia State	W 77–72	7–16 (2–10)	Holmes Center (2,169); Boone, NC
02/13/2017; 7:00 pm, ESPN3		Georgia Southern	W 83–78	8–16 (3–10)	Holmes Center (1,573); Boone, NC
02/18/2017; 8:00 pm		at South Alabama	L 74–87	8–17 (3–11)	Mitchell Center (2,786); Mobile, AL
02/20/2017; 8:00 pm, ESPN3		at Troy	L 66–76	8–18 (3–12)	Trojan Arena (1,876); Troy, AL
02/25/2017; 3:30 pm, ESPN3		Louisiana–Monroe	L 64–75	8–19 (3–13)	Holmes Center (1,874); Boone, NC
02/27/2017; 7:00 pm, ESPN3		Louisiana–Lafayette	L 62–77	8–20 (3–14)	Holmes Center (1,140); Boone, NC
03/05/2017; 3:30 pm, ESPN3		Coastal Carolina	W 77–73	9–20 (4–14)	Holmes Center (2,073); Boone, NC
Sun Belt tournament
03/08/2017; 8:30 pm, ESPN3	(11)	vs. (6) Troy; First Round	L 64–84	9–21	Lakefront Arena; New Orleans, LA
*Non-conference game. ^{#}Rankings from AP Poll. (#) Tournament seedings in parentheses. All times are in Eastern Time Source.
