= 2016–17 Louisiana–Monroe Warhawks men's basketball team =

American college basketball season

2016–17 Louisiana–Monroe Warhawks men's basketball
- Conference: Sun Belt Conference
- Record: 9–24 (2–16 Sun Belt)
- Head coach: Keith Richard (7th season)
- Assistant coaches: Ryan Cross; Stephen Cowherd; Phillipe Lilavois
- Home arena: Fant–Ewing Coliseum

2016–17 Sun Belt Conference men's basketball standings
	Conf.				Overall
Team	W		L	PCT	W		L	PCT
Texas–Arlington	14	–	4	.778	27	–	9	.750
Georgia State	12	–	6	.667	20	–	13	.606
Arkansas State	11	–	7	.611	20	–	12	.625
Texas State	11	–	7	.611	22	–	14	.611
Georgia Southern	11	–	7	.611	18	–	15	.545
Louisiana–Lafayette	10	–	8	.556	21	–	12	.636
Troy †	10	–	8	.556	22	–	15	.595
Coastal Carolina	10	–	8	.556	20	–	19	.513
South Alabama	7	–	11	.389	14	–	18	.438
Little Rock	6	–	12	.333	15	–	17	.469
Appalachian State	4	–	14	.222	9	–	21	.300
Louisiana–Monroe	2	–	16	.111	9	–	24	.273
† 2017 Sun Belt Conference tournament winner

The 2016–17 Louisiana–Monroe Warhawks men's basketball team represented the University of Louisiana at Monroe in the 2016–17 NCAA Division I men's basketball season. The Warhawks were led by seventh-year head coach Keith Richard, played their home games at Fant–Ewing Coliseum as members of the Sun Belt Conference. They finished the season 9–24, 2–16 in Sun Belt play to finish in last place. In the Sun Belt tournament, they defeated Arkansas State before losing to Texas State in the quarterfinals.

== Previous season ==
The Warhawks finished the 2015–16 season 20–14, 15–5 in Sun Belt play to finish in second place. They defeated Texas–Arlington in the semifinals of the Sun Belt tournament before losing to Little Rock in the championship game. They received an invitation to the CollegeInsider.com Tournament where they lost in the first round to Furman.

== Roster ==
2016–17 Louisiana–Monroe Warhawks men's basketball team
Players
Coaches

Pos.	#	Name	Height	Weight	Year	Hometown
F	0	Ramses Sandifer	6 ft 8 in (2.03 m)	205 lb (93 kg)	RS Fr	Arcola, Mississippi
F	1	Travis Munnings	6 ft 6 in (1.98 m)	195 lb (88 kg)	So	Freeport, Bahamas
F	2	Kiir Deng	6 ft 9 in (2.06 m)	195 lb (88 kg)	Jr	Adelaide, Australia
G	3	Marcus Washington	6 ft 2 in (1.88 m)	185 lb (84 kg)	Sr	Clinton, Mississippi
C	4	Sam Alabakis	6 ft 11 in (2.11 m)	220 lb (100 kg)	Fr	Perth, Australia
G	5	Marvin Jean-Pierre	6 ft 3 in (1.91 m)	190 lb (86 kg)	Jr	Pompano Beach, Florida
G	11	Nick Coppola	5 ft 11 in (1.8 m)	195 lb (88 kg)	Sr	Richmond, Virginia
G	14	Prince Cooper	6 ft 4 in (1.93 m)	205 lb (93 kg)	Sr	Freeport, Bahamas
G	22	Lance Richard	5 ft 10 in (1.78 m)	185 lb (84 kg)	RS Jr	Monroe, Louisiana
G	23	Jordon Harris	5 ft 11 in (1.8 m)	165 lb (75 kg)	Jr	San Antonio, Texas
F	24	Roderick Taylor	6 ft 8 in (2.03 m)	210 lb (95 kg)	RS So	Harker Heights, Texas
G	25	Wade Martin	6 ft 5 in (1.96 m)	185 lb (84 kg)	So	Point Pleasant, West Virginia
G/F	30	Sam McDaniel	6 ft 6 in (1.98 m)	210 lb (95 kg)	Jr	Morphett Vale, Australia

Head coach

- Keith Richard (Northeast Louisiana)

Assistant coach(es)

- Ryan Cross (Buffalo)
- Stephen Cowherd (South Alabama)
- Phillipe Lilavois (Texas Tech)

Legend

- (C) Team captain
- (S) Suspended
- (I) Ineligible
- (W) Walk-on
- Injured
- Current redshirt

Roster

== Schedule and results ==
Date time, TV	Rank^{#}	Opponent^{#}	Result	Record	Site (attendance) city, state
Exhibition
11/07/2016*; 7:00 pm		Louisiana College	W 103–68		Fant–Ewing Coliseum; Monroe, Louisiana
Non-conference regular season
11/11/2016*; 1:00 pm		Centenary	W 96–63	1–0	Fant–Ewing Coliseum (607); Monroe, Louisiana
11/14/2016*; 7:00 pm, LHN		at No. 23 Texas; Legends Classic	L 59–80	1–1	Frank Erwin Center (8,953); Austin, Texas
11/17/2016*; 8:00 pm, P12N		at Colorado; Legends Classic	L 70–89	1–2	Coors Events Center (7,329); Boulder, Colorado
11/21/2016*; 5:30 pm		vs. Seattle; Legends Classic	L 75–81 ^{OT}	1–3	Reese Court (300); Cheney, Washington
11/22/2016*; 5:30 pm		vs. Bryant; Legends Classic	L 57–64	1–4	Reese Court (300); Cheney, Washington
11/28/2016*; 7:00 pm		Stephen F. Austin	W 77–72	2–4	Fant–Ewing Coliseum (635); Monroe, Louisiana
12/03/2016*; 1:00 pm		at Chattanooga	L 52–79	2–5	McKenzie Arena (2,655); Chattanooga, Tennessee
12/10/2016*; 7:00 pm		Jacksonville State	W 88–83 ^{OT}	3–5	Fant–Ewing Coliseum (1,035); Monroe, Louisiana
12/12/2016*; 7:00 pm		Blue Mountain	W 72–41	4–5	Fant–Ewing Coliseum (1,152); Monroe, Louisiana
12/17/2016*; 4:30 pm		at Northwestern State	L 64–68	4–6	Prather Coliseum (737); Natchitoches, Louisiana
12/20/2016*; 1:00 pm		at Coppin State	W 65–53	5–6	Physical Education Complex (355); Baltimore, Maryland
12/22/2016*; 6:00 pm		at VCU	L 65–78	5–7	Siegel Center (7,637); Richmond, Virginia
12/28/2016*; 7:00 pm		Grambling State	W 81-45	6–7	Fant–Ewing Coliseum (1,912); Monroe, Louisiana
Sun Belt Conference regular season
12/31/2016; 3:00 pm		at Little Rock	L 75–79 ^{OT}	6–8 (0–1)	Jack Stephens Center (2,287); Little Rock, Arkansas
01/02/2017; 7:00 pm		at Arkansas State	L 45–76	6–9 (0–2)	Convocation Center (2,954); Jonesboro, Arkansas
01/07/2017; 7:15 pm		at Louisiana–Lafayette	L 60–69	6–10 (0–3)	Cajundome (4,714); Lafayette, Louisiana
01/14/2017; 4:00 pm		Georgia State	L 65–73 ^{OT}	6–11 (0–4)	Fant–Ewing Coliseum (1,634); Monroe, Louisiana
01/16/2017; 7:00 pm		Georgia Southern	L 60–62	6–12 (0–5)	Fant–Ewing Coliseum (1,542); Monroe, Louisiana
01/21/2017; 4:30 pm, ESPN3		at UT Arlington	L 55–71	6–13 (0–6)	College Park Center (2,659); Arlington, Texas
01/23/2017; 7:00 pm		at Texas State	L 57–63	6–14 (0–7)	Strahan Coliseum (1,824); San Marcos, Texas
01/28/2017; 4:00 pm		Arkansas State	L 63–73	6–15 (0–8)	Fant–Ewing Coliseum (2,211); Monroe, Louisiana
01/30/2017; 7:00 pm		Little Rock	W 68–52	7–15 (1–8)	Fant–Ewing Coliseum (1,712); Monroe, Louisiana
02/04/2017; 4:00 pm		at Georgia Southern	L 62–76	7–16 (1–9)	Hanner Fieldhouse (2,859); Statesboro, Georgia
02/06/2017; 6:00 pm, ESPN3		at Georgia State	L 55–69	7–17 (1–10)	GSU Sports Arena (1,015); Atlanta, Georgia
02/11/2017; 4:00 pm		South Alabama	L 63–66	7–18 (1–11)	Fant–Ewing Coliseum (1,421); Monroe, Louisiana
02/13/2017; 7:00 pm		Troy	L 72–73 ^{OT}	7–19 (1–12)	Fant–Ewing Coliseum (1,977); Monroe, Louisiana
02/18/2017; 4:00 pm, ESPN3		Louisiana–Lafayette	L 84–85	7–20 (1–13)	Fant–Ewing Coliseum (2,451); Monroe, Louisiana
02/25/2017; 2:30 pm, ESPN3		at Appalachian State	W 75–64	8–20 (2–13)	Holmes Center (1,874); Boone, North Carolina
02/27/2017; 6:00 pm		at Coastal Carolina	L 72–77	8–21 (2–14)	HTC Center (1,555); Conway, South Carolina
03/02/2017; 7:00 pm		UT Arlington	L 57–72	8–22 (2–15)	Fant–Ewing Coliseum (1,669); Monroe, Louisiana
03/04/2017; 2:00 pm		Texas State	L 65–70	8–23 (2–16)	Fant–Ewing Coliseum (1,504); Monroe, Louisiana
Sun Belt tournament
03/08/2017; 2:00 pm, ESPN3	(12)	vs. (5) Arkansas State; First Round	W 73–70 ^{OT}	9–23	Lakefront Arena (1,045); New Orleans, Louisiana
03/10/2017; 2:00 pm, ESPN3	(12)	vs. (4) Texas State; Quarterfinals	L 51–63	9–24	Lakefront Arena; New Orleans, Louisiana
*Non-conference game. ^{#}Rankings from AP Poll. (#) Tournament seedings in parentheses. All times are in Central Time.
