= 2016–17 Texas State Bobcats men's basketball team =

American college basketball season

2016–17 Texas State Bobcats men's basketball

Rainbow Classic champions

CIT, Quarterfinals
- Conference: Sun Belt Conference
- Record: 22–14 (11–7 Sun Belt)
- Head coach: Danny Kaspar (4th season)
- Assistant coaches: Jim Shaw; Robert Guster; Terrence Johnson
- Home arena: Strahan Coliseum

2016–17 Sun Belt Conference men's basketball standings
	Conf.				Overall
Team	W		L	PCT	W		L	PCT
Texas–Arlington	14	–	4	.778	27	–	9	.750
Georgia State	12	–	6	.667	20	–	13	.606
Arkansas State	11	–	7	.611	20	–	12	.625
Texas State	11	–	7	.611	22	–	14	.611
Georgia Southern	11	–	7	.611	18	–	15	.545
Louisiana–Lafayette	10	–	8	.556	21	–	12	.636
Troy †	10	–	8	.556	22	–	15	.595
Coastal Carolina	10	–	8	.556	20	–	19	.513
South Alabama	7	–	11	.389	14	–	18	.438
Little Rock	6	–	12	.333	15	–	17	.469
Appalachian State	4	–	14	.222	9	–	21	.300
Louisiana–Monroe	2	–	16	.111	9	–	24	.273
† 2017 Sun Belt Conference tournament winner

The 2016–17 Texas State Bobcats men's basketball team represented Texas State University in the 2016–17 NCAA Division I men's basketball season. The Bobcats, led by fourth-year head coach Danny Kaspar, played their home games at Strahan Coliseum in San Marcos, Texas as members of the Sun Belt Conference. They finished the season 22–14, 11–7 in Sun Belt play to finish in a three way tie for third place. At the Sun Belt tournament they defeated Louisiana–Monroe and UT Arlington before losing in the championship game to Troy. They received an invitation to the CollegeInsider.com Tournament where they defeated Lamar and Idaho before losing in the quarterfinals to Saint Peter's.

== Previous season ==
The Bobcats finished the 2015–16 season 15–16, 8–12 in Sun Belt play to finish in a tie for seventh place. They defeated Georgia State in the first round of the Sun Belt tournament to advance to the quarterfinals where they lost to Texas–Arlington.

== Roster ==
2016–17 Texas State Bobcats men's basketball team
Players
Coaches

Pos.	#	Name	Height	Weight	Year	Hometown
G	0	Bobby Conley	6 ft 1 in (1.85 m)	195 lb (88 kg)	Sr	Massillon, Ohio
F	1	Kavin Gilder-Tilbury	6 ft 7 in (2.01 m)	210 lb (95 kg)	Sr	Houston, Texas
G	2	Nathan Josephs	5 ft 10 in (1.78 m)	180 lb (82 kg)	So	San Antonio, Texas
F	3	Maljhum McCrea	6 ft 7 in (2.01 m)	215 lb (98 kg)	Sr	Miami, Florida
G	4	Courtney Julien	6 ft 4 in (1.93 m)	180 lb (82 kg)	So	Gonzales, Louisiana
G	5	Ojai Black	6 ft 1 in (1.85 m)	195 lb (88 kg)	Sr	Killeen, Texas
G	10	Tyler Blount	5 ft 11 in (1.8 m)	165 lb (75 kg)	Jr	Virginia Beach, Virginia
G	12	Deris Duncan	6 ft 4 in (1.93 m)	185 lb (84 kg)	Jr	Fishers, Indiana
F	13	Maxwell Starwood	6 ft 8 in (2.03 m)	225 lb (102 kg)	Fr	Baton Rouge, Louisiana
G	22	Nijal Pearson	6 ft 5 in (1.96 m)	200 lb (91 kg)	Fr	Beaumont, Texas
G	23	Marlin Davis	6 ft 2 in (1.88 m)	165 lb (75 kg)	Fr	Houston, Texas
F	33	Immanuel King	6 ft 8 in (2.03 m)	220 lb (100 kg)	Jr	Rocky Mount, North Carolina
F	45	Eric Terry	6 ft 8 in (2.03 m)	230 lb (104 kg)	So	Houston, Texas
F	55	Nedeljko Prijovic	6 ft 8 in (2.03 m)	210 lb (95 kg)	Fr	Belgrade, Serbia

Head coach

- Danny Kaspar (North Texas State)

Assistant coach(es)

- Jim Shaw (Grinnell)
- Terrence Johnson
- Robert Guster (Missouri–Rolla)

Legend

- (C) Team captain
- (S) Suspended
- (I) Ineligible
- (W) Walk-on
- Injured
- Current redshirt

Roster

== Schedule and results ==
Date time, TV	Rank^{#}	Opponent^{#}	Result	Record	Site (attendance) city, state
Exhibition
11/05/2016*; 4:30 pm		Southeastern Oklahoma State	W 62–41		Strahan Coliseum (1,439); San Marcos, TX
Non-conference regular season
11/11/2016*; 9:00 pm		vs. Florida Atlantic; Rainbow Classic	W 61–57	1–0	ʻIolani School Gym; Honolulu, HI
11/13/2016*; 9:00 pm		at Hawaii; Rainbow Classic	L 68–74	1–1	Stan Sheriff Center (5,309); Honolulu, HI
11/14/2016*; 10:00 pm		vs. SIU Edwardsville; Rainbow Classic	W 86–58	2–1	Stan Sheriff Center (110); Honolulu, HI
11/21/2016*; 7:00 pm		Texas A&M–Corpus Christi	L 69–73	2–2	Strahan Coliseum (1,797); San Marcos, TX
11/25/2016*; 7:00 pm		at UTSA	L 48–63	2–3	Convocation Center (1,057); San Antonio, TX
11/29/2016*; 7:00 pm		McNeese State	W 80–68	3–3	Strahan Coliseum (1,590); San Marcos, TX
12/01/2016*; 7:00 pm		Oklahoma Panhandle State	W 75–44	4–3	Strahan Coliseum (1,418); San Marcos, TX
12/07/2016*; 7:00 pm		at Texas–Rio Grande Valley	L 61–72	4–4	UTRGV Fieldhouse (1,126); Edinburg, TX
12/10/2016*; 4:00 pm		Prairie View A&M	W 64–57	5–4	Strahan Coliseum (2,117); San Marcos, TX
12/17/2016*; 7:00 pm		at Tulsa	L 59–74	5–5	Reynolds Center (3,990); Tulsa, OK
12/20/2016*; 7:00 pm		Howard Payne	W 87–37	6–5	Strahan Coliseum (1,306); San Marcos, TX
12/23/2016*; 1:00 pm, ESPN3		at Tulane	W 69–66 ^{OT}	7–5	Devlin Fieldhouse (1,087); New Orleans, LA
Sun Belt regular season
12/31/2016; 4:30 pm		Appalachian State	W 67–58	8–5 (1–0)	Strahan Coliseum (1,318); San Marcos, TX
01/02/2017; 7:00 pm		Coastal Carolina	L 53–60	8–6 (1–1)	Strahan Coliseum (1,209); San Marcos, TX
01/07/2017; 4:30 pm		UT Arlington	W 81–73	9–6 (2–1)	Strahan Coliseum (1,667); San Marcos, TX
01/14/2017; 3:00 pm		at South Alabama	L 67–72 ^{OT}	9–7 (2–2)	Mitchell Center (2,076); Mobile, AL
01/16/2017; 7:00 pm, ESPN3		at Troy	W 75–71	10–7 (3–2)	Trojan Arena (1,176); Troy, AL
01/21/2017; 4:30 pm		Louisiana–Lafayette	L 73–79	10–8 (3–3)	Strahan Coliseum (2,826); San Marcos, TX
01/23/2017; 7:00 pm		Louisiana–Monroe	W 63–57	11–8 (4–3)	Strahan Coliseum (1,824); San Marcos, TX
01/28/2017; 3:30 pm		at Coastal Carolina	W 52–50	12–8 (5–3)	HTC Center (2,070); Conway, SC
01/30/2017; 7:00 pm, ESPN3		at Appalachian State	W 68–55	13–8 (6–3)	Holmes Center (1,123); Boone, NC
02/04/2017; 4:30 pm		at UT Arlington	L 61–76	13–9 (6–4)	College Park Center (3,483); Arlington, TX
02/11/2017; 4:30 pm		Little Rock	W 56–49	14–9 (7–4)	Strahan Coliseum (2,435); San Marcos, TX
02/13/2017; 7:00 pm		Arkansas State	W 62–58	15–9 (8–4)	Strahan Coliseum (1,953); San Marcos, TX
02/18/2017; 4:00 pm		at Georgia Southern	L 67–70	15–10 (8–5)	Hanner Fieldhouse (2,281); Statesboro, GA
02/20/2017; 6:00 pm, ESPN3		at Georgia State	L 51–67	15–11 (8–6)	GSU Sports Arena (1,406); Atlanta, GA
02/25/2017; 4:30 pm		Troy	W 63–59	16–11 (9–6)	Strahan Coliseum (3,057); San Marcos, TX
02/27/2017; 7:00 pm		South Alabama	W 90–64	17–11 (10–6)	Strahan Coliseum (3,527); San Marcos, TX
03/02/2017; 7:15 pm		at Louisiana–Lafayette	L 84–94 ^{OT}	17–12 (10–7)	Cajundome (3,427); Lafayette, LA
03/04/2017; 2:00 pm		at Louisiana–Monroe	W 70–65	18–12 (11–7)	Fant–Ewing Coliseum (1,504); Monroe, LA
Sun Belt tournament
03/10/2017; 2:00 pm, ESPN3	(4)	vs. (12) Louisiana–Monroe; Quarterfinals	W 63–51	19–12	Lakefront Arena; New Orleans, LA
03/11/2017; 11:30 am, ESPN3	(4)	vs. (1) UT Arlington; Semifinals	W 83–62	20–12	Lakefront Arena; New Orleans, LA
03/12/2017; 1:00 pm, ESPN2	(4)	vs. (6) Troy; Championship game	L 53–59	20–13	Lakefront Arena; New Orleans, LA
CIT
03/16/2017*; 7:30 pm, Facebook Live		Lamar; First Round	W 70–60	21–13	Strahan Coliseum (1,255); San Marcos, TX
03/22/2017*; 7:00 pm, Facebook Live		Idaho; Second Round	W 64–55	22–13	Strahan Coliseum (3,086); San Marcos, TX
03/25/2017*; 4:00 pm, Facebook Live		Saint Peter's; Quarterfinals	L 44–49	22–14	Strahan Coliseum (2,907); San Marcos, TX
*Non-conference game. ^{#}Rankings from AP Poll. (#) Tournament seedings in parentheses. All times are in Central Time.
