= Ben Betts (basketball) =

American basketball player and coach

Biographical details
- Born: August 5, 1968 (age 58); Lynchburg, Virginia, U.S.

Playing career
- 1986–1990: Roanoke
- Position: Guard

Coaching career (HC unless noted)
- 1990–1997: South Carolina State (asst.)
- 1997–2002: College of Charleston (asst.)
- 2002–2003: VCU (asst.)
- 2003–2006: South Carolina State
- 2006–2011: Oklahoma (asst.)
- 2011–2014: Tennessee State (asst.)
- 2014–2015: IPFW (asst.)
- 2015–2020: Georgia Southern (asst.)
- 2020–2021: Western Carolina (asst.)
- 2021–2024: Winthrop (asst.)

Head coaching record
- Overall: 52–41 (.559)

Accomplishments and honors

Championships
- MEAC regular season champion (2004)

Ben Betts (born August 5, 1968) is an assistant men's basketball coach at Winthrop University. He has previously held the head coaching position at South Carolina State University.

== Head coaching record ==
Record table
Season	Team	Overall	Conference	Standing	Postseason
South Carolina State Bulldogs (MEAC) (2003–2006)
2003–04	South Carolina State	18–11	14–4	T–1st	
2004–05	South Carolina State	19–12	11–7	T–4th	
2005–06	South Carolina State	14–16	11–7	T–3rd	
South Carolina State:		51–39 (.567)	38–18 (.679)		
Total:		51–39 (.567)			
National champion Postseason invitational champion Conference regular season champion Conference regular season and conference tournament champion Division regular season champion Division regular season and conference tournament champion Conference tournament champion
