= 2012–13 Louisiana–Lafayette Ragin' Cajuns women's basketball team =

Intercollegiate basketball season

2012–13 Louisiana–Lafayette Ragin' Cajuns women's basketball

Sun Belt Tournament, Quarterfinals (L, Western Kentucky 57–61)
- Conference: Sun Belt Conference
- West Division
- Record: 10–21 (3–17 Sun Belt)
- Head coach: Garry Brodhead (1st season)
- Assistant coaches: Deacon Jones; Sallie Guillory; Jennifer Sullivan
- Home arena: Earl K. Long Gymnasium

2012–13 Sun Belt Conference women's basketball standings
| | Conf. | | | | Overall |
| Team | W | | L | PCT | W | | L | PCT |
|---|---|---|---|---|---|---|---|---|
East Division
| Middle Tennessee† | 17 | – | 3 | .850 | 25 | – | 8 | .758 |
| Western Kentucky | 13 | – | 7 | .650 | 22 | – | 11 | .667 |
| FIU | 12 | – | 8 | .600 | 19 | – | 13 | .594 |
| South Alabama | 10 | – | 10 | .500 | 17 | – | 13 | .567 |
| Florida Atlantic | 9 | – | 11 | .450 | 12 | – | 17 | .414 |
| Troy | 3 | – | 17 | .150 | 7 | – | 24 | .226 |
West Division
| Arkansas–Little Rock | 14 | – | 6 | .700 | 24 | – | 9 | .727 |
| Arkansas State | 12 | – | 8 | .600 | 15 | – | 15 | .500 |
| Appalachian State | 6 | – | 12 | .333 | 12 | – | 19 | .387 |
| North Texas | 10 | – | 10 | .500 | 11 | – | 19 | .367 |
| Louisiana–Monroe | 7 | – | 13 | .350 | 10 | – | 21 | .323 |
| Louisiana–Lafayette | 3 | – | 17 | .150 | 10 | – | 21 | .323 |
† Tournament winner Rankings from Coaches

The 2012–13 Louisiana–Lafayette Ragin' Cajuns women's basketball team represented the University of Louisiana at Lafayette during the 2012–13 NCAA Division I women's basketball season. The Ragin' Cajuns were led by first-year head coach Gary Broadhead; they played their double-header home games at the Cajundome with other games at the Earl K. Long Gymnasium, which is located on campus. They were members in the Sun Belt Conference. They finished the season 10–21, 3–17 in Sun Belt play to finish fifth place in the West Division. They were eliminated in the quarterfinals of the Sun Belt women's tournament.

== Previous season ==
The Ragin' Cajuns finished the 2011–12 season 7–23, 1–15 in Sun Belt play to finish sixth in the West Division. They made it to the 2012 Sun Belt Conference women's basketball tournament, losing in the first round game by a score of 53-71 to the Florida International Panthers. They were not invited to any other postseason tournament.

== Roster ==
2012–13 Louisiana–Lafayette Ragin' Cajuns women's basketball team
Players
Coaches

| Pos. | # | Name | Height | Year | Previous school | Hometown |
|---|---|---|---|---|---|---|
| G | 00 | Brandi Schambough | 5 ft 6 in (1.68 m) | Sr | St. Thomas More HS | Youngsville, LA |
| G | 2 | Brooklyn Arceneaux | 5 ft 9 in (1.75 m) | So | St. Thomas More HS | Lafayette, LA |
| G | 3 | Robbie Brown | 5 ft 8 in (1.73 m) | So | St. Thomas More HS | Lafayette, LA |
| G | 10 | Kia Wilridge | 5 ft 5 in (1.65 m) | Fr | St. Thomas More HS | Crowley, LA |
| G/F | 14 | Adrienne Prejean | 5 ft 9 in (1.75 m) | Fr | Lafayette HS | Lafayette, LA |
| F | 21 | Jasmin Mills | 6 ft 1 in (1.85 m) | Fr | Assumption HS | Belle Rose, LA |
| G | 24 | Keke Veal | 5 ft 6 in (1.68 m) | Fr | St. Thomas More HS | Opelousas, LA |
| G | 25 | Sylvana Okde | 5 ft 6 in (1.68 m) | Fr | Westbury Christian School | Houston, TX |

Head coach

- Gary Broadhead (Louisiana)

Assistant coach(es)

- Deacon Jones (Louisiana)
- Sallie Guillory (Louisiana)
- Jennifer Sullivan (Memphis)

Legend

- (C) Team captain
- (S) Suspended
- (I) Ineligible
- (W) Walk-on
- Injured
- Current redshirt

Roster
Last update: April 7, 2019

== Schedule and results ==
| Date time, TV | Rank^{#} | Opponent^{#} | Result | Record | High points | High rebounds | High assists | Site (attendance) city, state |
Exhibition
| 11/03/2012*; 12:00 pm | | Centenary College (LA) | W 108-38 | | --- – --- | --- – --- | --- – --- | Earl K. Long Gymnasium; Lafayette, LA |
Non-conference regular season
| 11/09/2012*; 6:00 pm | | at Southern | W 71-69 | 1-0 | 19 – Benjamin | 9 – Veal | 4 – Wilridge | F. G. Clark Center (515); Baton Rouge, LA |
| 11/12/2012*; 7:00 pm | | LSU-Shreveport | W 83-42 | 2–0 | 19 – Okde | 9 – Wilridge | 6 – Wilridge | Earl K. Long Gymnasium (1,007); Lafayette, LA |
| 11/16/2012*; 7:00 pm | | at Nebraska–Omaha | L 67-79 | 2-1 | 20 – Okde | 4 – Wilridge | 6 – Wilridge | Baxter Arena (647); Omaha, NE |
| 11/19/2012*; 6:00 pm | | at Nicholls State | L 62-71 | 2-2 | 19 – Veal | 11 – Santiago | 3 – Wilridge | Stopher Gymnasium (211); Thibodaux, LA |
Sun Belt regular season
| 11/24/2012; 12:00 pm | | Middle Tennessee | L 45-72 | 2-3 (0-1) | 14 – Wilridge | 10 – Santiago | 2 – Wilridge | Earl K. Long Gymnasium (228); Lafayette, LA |
Non-conference regular season
| 11/28/2012*; 7:00 pm | | Southern-New Orleans | W 71-49 | 3-3 | 20 – Okde | 10 – Mills | 3 – Brown | Earl K. Long Gymnasium (386); Lafayette, LA |
Sun Belt regular season
| 12/01/2012; 5:00 pm | | at North Texas | L 59-71 | 3-4 (0-2) | 14 – Benjamin | 8 – Santiago | 3 – Wilridge | UNT Coliseum; Denton, TX |
Non-conference regular season
| 12/10/2012*; 7:00 pm | | Jackson State | W 68-57 | 4-4 | 16 – Veal | 13 – Santiago | 4 – Benjamin | Earl K. Long Gymnasium (365); Lafayette, LA |
| 12/13/2012*; 7:00 pm | | New Orleans | W 68-41 | 5-4 | 15 – Benjamin | 8 – Brown | 5 – Wilridge | Earl K. Long Gymnasium (377); Lafayette, LA |
| 12/17/2012*; 7:00 pm | | UC Riverside | L 37-55 | 5-5 | 14 – Okde | 11 – Benjamin | 2 – Wilridge | Earl K. Long Gymnasium (369); Lafayette, LA |
| 12/19/2012*; 11:00 am | | at Tulane | W 65-64 ^{OT} | 6-5 | 23 – Okde | 9 – Mills | 9 – Wilridge | Devlin Fieldhouse (1,001); New Orleans, LA |
Sun Belt regular season
| 12/22/2012; 1:05 pm | | at Arkansas State | L 53-77 | 6-6 (0-3) | 15 – Wilridge | 9 – Mills | 3 – Wilridge | Convocation Center (1,209); Jonesboro, AR |
| 12/29/2012; 5:00 pm | | Arkansas-Little Rock | W 56-52 ^{2OT} | 7-6 (1-3) | 12 – Benjamin | 16 – Benjamin | 3 – Wilridge | Cajundome (751); Lafayette, LA |
| 01/02/2013; 6:00 pm | | at Florida Atlantic | L 44-79 | 7-7 (1-4) | 10 – Veal | 11 – Mills | 2 – Wilridge | FAU Arena (258); Boca Raton, FL |
| 01/05/2013; 4:30 pm | | at FIU | L 47-63 | 7-8 (1-5) | 14 – Veal | 6 – Benjamin | 3 – Okde | U.S. Century Bank Arena (385); Miami, FL |
| 01/09/2013; 7:00 pm | | South Alabama | L 43-53 | 7-9 (1-6) | 14 – Okde | 7 – Wilridge | 3 – Wilridge | Earl K. Long Gymnasium (286); Lafayette, LA |
| 01/12/2013; 5:00 pm | | Arkansas State | L 39-48 | 7-10 (1-7) | 16 – Veal | 7 – Wilridge | 4 – Wilridge | Cajundome (409); Lafayette, LA |
| 01/16/2013; 7:00 pm | | at Western Kentucky | L 64-75 | 7-11 (1-8) | 22 – Okde | 6 – Brown | 5 – Veal | E. A. Diddle Arena (909); Bowling Green, KY |
| 01/19/2013; 3:00 pm | | at Middle Tennessee | L 36-72 | 7-12 (1-9) | 9 – Brown | 9 – Prejean | 5 – Veal | Murphy Center; Murfreesboro, TN |
| 01/23/2013; 7:00 pm | | FIU | L 63-64 ^{OT} | 7-13 (1-10) | 15 – Veal | 7 – Benjamin | 2 – Wilridge | Earl K. Long Gymnasium (235); Lafayette, LA |
| 01/30/2013; 7:00 pm | | North Texas | L 46-64 | 7-14 (1-11) | 10 – Benjamin | 8 – Benjamin | 4 – Wilridge | Earl K. Long Gymnasium (746); Lafayette, LA |
| 02/02/2013; 5:15 pm | | at Troy | L 61-68 | 7-15 (1-12) | 19 – Veal | 10 – Veal | 3 – Wilridge | Trojan Arena (845); Troy, AL |
| 02/10/2013; 5:00 pm | | Louisiana-Monroe | L 63-68 ^{OT} | 7-16 (1-13) | 20 – Okde | 13 – Mills | 4 – Veal | Cajundome (456); Lafayette, LA |
| 02/13/2013; 7:05 pm | | at South Alabama | L 39-53 | 7-17 (1-14) | 11 – Veal | 5 – Benjamin | 2 – Wilridge | Mitchell Center (375); Mobile, AL |
| 02/16/2013; 5:00 pm | | Florida Atlantic | W 72-57 | 8-17 (2-14) | 20 – Wilridge | 8 – Mills | 3 – Wilridge | Cajundome (369); Lafayette, LA |
| 02/20/2013; 7:00 pm | | Troy | W 63-59 | 9-17 (3-14) | 18 – Benjamin | 14 – Benjamin | 5 – Wilridge | Earl K. Long Gymnasium (307); Lafayette, LA |
| 02/23/2013; 5:00 pm, Sun Belt Network | | Western Kentucky | L 58-77 | 9-18 (3-15) | 16 – Veal | 7 – Benjamin | 4 – Wilridge | Cajundome (469); Lafayette, LA |
| 02/28/2013; 5:15 pm | | at Arkansas–Little Rock | L 41-48 | 9-19 (3-16) | 25 – Veal | 8 – Wilridge | 1 – Brown | Jack Stephens Center; Little Rock, AR |
| 03/02/2013; 2:00 pm | | at Louisiana-Monroe | L 50-64 | 9-20 (3-17) | 21 – Veal | 14 – Mills | 2 – Schambough | Fant-Ewing Coliseum; Monroe, LA |
Sun Belt Women's Tournament (1-1)
| 03/08/2013; 2:30 pm | (11) | vs. (6) North Texas; First Round | W 80-74 ^{2OT} | 10-20 | 17 – Veal | 11 – Mills | 5 – Wilridge | Summit Arena; Hot Springs, AR |
| 03/09/2013; 2:00 pm | (11) | vs. (3) Western Kentucky; Quarterfinals | L 57-61 | 10-21 | 21 – Veal | 9 – Mills | 5 – Veal | Summit Arena; Hot Springs, AR |
*Non-conference game. ^{#}Rankings from AP Poll. (#) Tournament seedings in parentheses. All times are in Central Time.

== See also ==
- 2012–13 Louisiana–Lafayette Ragin' Cajuns men's basketball team
