= 2022–23 Troy Trojans women's basketball team =

Intercollegiate basketball season

2022–23 Troy Trojans women's basketball
- Conference: Sun Belt Conference
- Record: 17–13 (12–6 Sun Belt)
- Head coach: Chanda Rigby (11th season)
- Assistant coaches: Jennifer Graf; Courtney Simmons; Chelsea Dungee
- Home arena: Trojan Arena

2022–23 Sun Belt Conference women's basketball standings
	Conf.				Overall
Team	W		L	PCT	W		L	PCT
James Madison †	13	–	5	.722	27	–	8	.771
Texas State	13	–	5	.722	24	–	10	.706
Southern Miss	13	–	5	.722	21	–	10	.677
Georgia Southern	12	–	6	.667	21	–	10	.677
Old Dominion	12	–	6	.667	22	–	13	.629
Troy	12	–	6	.667	17	–	13	.567
Louisiana	10	–	8	.556	22	–	21	.512
Marshall	9	–	9	.500	17	–	14	.548
Coastal Carolina	9	–	9	.500	14	–	17	.452
Arkansas State	6	–	12	.333	13	–	19	.406
Appalachian State	6	–	12	.333	11	–	20	.355
Georgia State	5	–	13	.278	12	–	21	.364
Louisiana–Monroe	3	–	15	.167	7	–	23	.233
South Alabama	3	–	15	.167	7	–	23	.233
† 2023 Sun Belt tournament winner

The 2022–23 Troy Trojans women's basketball team represented Troy University during the 2022–23 NCAA Division I women's basketball season. The basketball team, led by eleventh-year head coach Chanda Rigby, played all home games at the Trojan Arena along with the Troy Trojans men's basketball team. They were members of the Sun Belt Conference.

== Previous season ==
The Trojans finished the 2021–22 season 24–9, 13–2 in Sun Belt play to finish regular season champions. They made it to the WNIT Tournament for the first time since 2019 where they were defeated by the visiting Alabama in a narrow margin of 79–82 in the first round.

== Roster ==
2022–23 Troy Trojans women's basketball team
Players
Coaches

Pos.	#	Name	Height	Year	Previous school	Hometown
G	0	Gabbi Cartagena	5 ft 8 in (1.73 m)	So	Jackson HS	Jackson, Georgia
G	1	Mary Delgado	5 ft 8 in (1.73 m)	Jr	Miami Northwestern HS; Iowa Western CC	Miami, Florida
F	2	Felmas Koranga	6 ft 1 in (1.85 m)	Sr	Tyler JC	Nakuru, Kenya
G	3	Makayia Hallmon	5 ft 3 in (1.6 m)	Jr	Red River HS; Louisiana	Coushatta, Louisiana
G	4	Jashanti Simmons	5 ft 8 in (1.73 m)	So	Putnam County HS; Georgia Highlands	Fatonton, Georgia
G	5	Jada Walton	5 ft 11 in (1.8 m)	Sr	Southwest DeKalb HS; Texas Tech	Lithonia, Georgia
F	10	Tai'Sheka Porchia	6 ft 1 in (1.85 m)	Jr	Camden Fairview HS; Pensacola State	Camden, Arkansas
F	11	Ja'Mia Hollings	6 ft 2 in (1.88 m)	Jr	West Point HS; East Mississippi CC	West Point, Mississippi
G	12	Nia Daniel	5 ft 10 in (1.78 m)	Jr	Hickory Ridge HS; Alabama	Charlotte, North Carolina
F	13	Amber Leggett	5 ft 11 in (1.8 m)	Sr	Choctawhatchee HS; Sam Houston	Navarre, Florida
F	20	Janeen Camp	6 ft 5 in (1.96 m)	Sr	TPLS Christian Academy; Coastal Carolina	Portsmouth, Virginia
F	21	Ke'Ajia Williams	6 ft 2 in (1.88 m)	So	Jeff Davis HS; Shelton State CC	Montgomery, Alabama
G	22	Sharonica Hartsfield	5 ft 5 in (1.65 m)	So	Putnam City West HS	Oklahoma City, Oklahoma
G	23	Shaniah Nunn	6 ft 0 in (1.83 m)	Fr	Fairfield HS	Birmingham, Alabama
G	31	Jamila Nansikombi-Gunter	5 ft 11 in (1.8 m)	Jr	Moberly Area CC	Kampala, Uganda

Head coach

- Chanda Rigby (Nova Southeastern)

Assistant coach(es)

- Jennifer Graf (Northwestern State)
- Courtney Simmons (Louisville)
- Chelsea Dungee (Arkansas)

Legend

- (C) Team captain
- (S) Suspended
- (I) Ineligible
- (W) Walk-on
- Injured
- Current redshirt

Roster

== Schedule and results ==
Date time, TV	Rank^{#}	Opponent^{#}	Result	Record	High points	High rebounds	High assists	Site city, state
Non-conference Regular Season
11/07/2022*; 4:30 p.m., ESPN+		at Samford	W 66–62	1–0	15 – Hallmon	14 – Korange	4 – Hartsfield	Pete Hanna Center (378); Homewood, AL
11/10/2022*; 6:00 p.m., ESPN+		at UT Martin	W 89–84	2–0	18 – Walton	11 – Porchia	10 – Hartsfield	Kathleen and Tom Elam Center (1,147); Martin, TN
11/13/2022*; 4:00 p.m., PAC12N		at No. RV UCLA	L 83–95	2–1	14 – Hallmon	13 – TEAM	3 – Delgado	Pauley Pavilion (2,248); Los Angeles, CA
11/16/2022*; 8:00 p.m., WCCN		at San Francisco	L 73–84	2–2	19 – Porchia	7 – Porchia	3 – Walton	Sobrato Center (315); San Francisco, CA
11/19/2022*; 7:00 p.m.		vs. BYU; Hawaii North Shore Showcase	W 68–62	3–2	17 – Daniel	7 – Porchia	4 – Hartsfield	Cannon Activities Center (547); Oahu, HI
11/21/2022*; 5:00 p.m.		vs. Washington State; Hawaii North Shore Showcase	L 72–87	3–3	27 – Hollings	8 – Walton	4 – Hallmon	Cannon Activities Center (76); Oahu, HI
12/01/2022*; 7:00 p.m., SECN+		at Arkansas	L 70–87	3–4	25 – Hallmon	10 – Camp	3 – Delgado	Bud Walton Arena (3,019); Fayetteville, AR
12/07/2022*; 6:00 p.m., ESPN+		Tulane	L 100–103 ^{2OT}	3–5	28 – Daniel	15 – Hollings	6 – Hallmon	Trojan Arena (2,137); Troy, AL
12/10/2022*; 2:00 p.m., ESPN+		Mercer	W 79–73	4–5	24 – Daniel	11 – TEAM	5 – Hartsfield	Trojan Arena (1,879); Troy, AL
12/14/2022*; 12:00 p.m., ESPN+		LaGrange	W 114–49	5–5	15 – Camp	15 – Camp	5 – Hartsfield	Trojan Arena (1,776); Troy, AL
12/20/2022*; 1:00 p.m., ESPN+		at Belmont	L 87–98 ^{OT}	5–6	22 – Hallmon	12 – Porchia	4 – Walton	Curb Event Center (1,002); Nashville, TN
Conference regular season
12/29/2022; 6:00 p.m., ESPN+		Southern Miss	L 75–77	5–7 (0–1)	28 – Daniel	7 – Simmons	3 – Hallmon	Trojan Arena (1,872); Troy, AL
12/31/2022; 2:00 p.m., ESPN+		Texas State	W 79–63	6–7 (1–1)	15 – Hallmon	16 – Camp	6 – Hartsfield	Trojan Arena (1,693); Troy, AL
01/05/2023; 7:00 p.m., ESPN+		at Arkansas State	W 83–67	7–7 (2–1)	17 – Daniel	11 – Camp	4 – Hallmon	First National Bank Arena (693); Jonesboro, AR
01/07/2023; 1:00 p.m., ESPN+		at Georgia State	W 81–58	8–7 (3–1)	18 – Hallmon	8 – Leggett	4 – Hartsfield	Georgia State Convocation Center (472); Atlanta, GA
01/12/2023; 6:00 p.m., ESPN+		Louisiana–Monroe	W 92–74	9–7 (4–1)	21 – Hallmon	11 – Leggett	4 – Hallmon	Trojan Arena (2,254); Troy, AL
01/14/2023; 4:00 p.m.		Louisiana	W 85–78 ^{OT}	10–7 (5–1)	22 – Daniel	10 – Leggett	5 – Hartsfield	Trojan Arena (2,187); Troy, AL
01/19/2023; 5:00 p.m., ESPN+		at Marshall	W 87–77	11–7 (6–1)	19 – Hollings	9 – Hollings	6 – Hartsfield	Cam Henderson Center (954); Huntington, WV
01/21/2023; 3:00 p.m., ESPN+		at James Madison	L 79–80	11–8 (6–2)	33 – Hallmon	8 – Leggett	8 – Hartsfield	Atlantic Union Bank Center (3,079); Harrisonburg, VA
01/26/2023; 6:00 p.m., ESPN+		South Alabama	W 81–62	12–8 (7–2)	23 – Hollings	20 – Hollings	3 – Hallmon	Trojan Arena (2,917); Troy, AL
01/28/2023; 4:00 p.m., ESPN+		Georgia Southern	W 100–77	13–8 (8–2)	19 – Hallmon	10 – Hollings	4 – Hallmon	Trojan Arena (2,324); Troy, AL
02/02/2023; 7:00 p.m., ESPN+		at Texas State	W 84–78	14–8 (9–2)	28 – Porchia	15 – Porchia	5 – Walton	Strahan Arena (1,142); San Marcos, TX
02/04/2023; 2:00 p.m., ESPN+		at Louisiana	W 81–80	15–8 (10–2)	20 – Hallmon	12 – Porchia	3 – Hallmon	Cajundome (714); Lafayette, LA
02/09/2023; 5:15 p.m., ESPN+		Arkansas State	L 92–98	15–9 (10–3)	15 – Hollings	15 – Porchia	6 – Hartsfield	Trojan Arena (3,213); Troy, AL
02/11/2023; 2:00 p.m., ESPN+		at Louisiana–Monroe	W 108–82	16–9 (11–3)	22 – Porchia	10 – Porchia	7 – Delgado	Fant–Ewing Coliseum (617); Monroe, LA
02/16/2023; 6:00 p.m., ESPN+		Coastal Carolina	L 97–99	16–10 (11–4)	25 – Leggett	14 – Leggett	7 – Hallmon	Trojan Arena (2,371); Troy, AL
02/18/2023; 4:00 p.m., ESPN+		Appalachian State	W 73–66	17–10 (12–4)	17 – Hallmon	15 – Hollings	4 – Hallmon	Trojan Arena; Troy, AL
02/22/2023; 6:00 p.m., ESPN+		at Southern Miss	L 79–88	17–11 (12–5)	22 – Hallmon	16 – Hollings	3 – Hollings	Reed Green Coliseum (1,023); Hattiesburg, MS
02/24/2023; 7:00 p.m., ESPN+		at South Alabama	L 59–60	17–12 (12–6)	15 – Hallmon	11 – Porchia	2 – Cartagena	Mitchell Center (644); Mobile, AL
Sun Belt Tournament
03/03/2023; 2:00 p.m., ESPN+	(4)	vs. (5) Old Dominion; Quarterfinals	L 83–86	17–13	26 – Hallmon	7 – Hollings	3 – Leggett	Pensacola Bay Center; Pensacola, FL
*Non-conference game. ^{#}Rankings from AP Poll. (#) Tournament seedings in parentheses. All times are in Central Time.

== See also ==
- 2022–23 Troy Trojans men's basketball team
