= 2014–15 Louisiana–Lafayette Ragin' Cajuns women's basketball team =

Intercollegiate basketball season

2014–15 Louisiana-Lafayette Ragin' Cajuns women's basketball

Women's Basketball Invitational champion
- Conference: Sun Belt Conference
- Record: 23–12 (10–10 Sun Belt)
- Head coach: Garry Brodhead (3rd season)
- Assistant coaches: Deacon Jones; Sallie Guillory; Cornelius Sullivan
- Home arena: Cajundome; Earl K. Long Gymnasium (5 games)

2014–15 Sun Belt Conference women's basketball standings
	Conf.				Overall
Team	W		L	PCT	W		L	PCT
Arkansas–Little Rock †	18	–	2	.900	25	–	4	.862
Arkansas State	16	–	4	.800	21	–	9	.700
Troy	15	–	5	.750	20	–	9	.690
UT Arlington	11	–	9	.550	17	–	12	.586
Texas State	11	–	9	.550	16	–	13	.552
Louisiana–Lafayette	10	–	10	.500	18	–	11	.621
Appalachian State	9	–	11	.450	14	–	15	.483
Georgia State	8	–	12	.400	13	–	16	.448
Louisiana–Monroe	8	–	12	.400	12	–	17	.414
Georgia Southern	2	–	18	.100	5	–	24	.172
South Alabama	2	–	18	.100	5	–	24	.172
† 2015 Sun Belt tournament winner

The 2014–15 Louisiana–Lafayette Ragin' Cajuns women's basketball team represented the University of Louisiana at Lafayette during the 2014–15 NCAA Division I women's basketball season. The Ragin' Cajuns were led by third-year head coach Garry Brodhead and played all their home games at the Cajundome with the a select few (mainly during the Women's Basketball Invitational) at the Earl K. Long Gymnasium, which is located on the University of Louisiana at Lafayette campus. They were members in the Sun Belt Conference. They finished the season 23-12, 10–10 in Sun Belt play to finish in sixth place. They advanced to the semifinal game of the Sun Belt women's tournament where they lost to Arkansas State by the score of 61-63. They competed in the Women's Basketball Invitational and went to the championship game, winning by the score of 52-50 against the Siena Saints

== Previous season ==
The Ragin' Cajuns finished the 2013–14 season 14-16, 7-11 in Sun Belt play to finish in a two-way tie for seventh place in the conference. They made it to the 2014 Sun Belt Conference women's basketball tournament, losing in the first round game by the score of 61-67 to the Western Kentucky Hilltoppers. They were not invited to any other postseason tournament.

== Roster ==
2014–15 Louisiana-Lafayette Ragin' Cajuns women's basketball team
Players
Coaches

Pos.	#	Name	Height	Year	Previous school	Hometown
G/F	1	Brooklyn Arceneaux	5 ft 9 in (1.75 m)	RS Jr	St. Thomas More HS	Lafayette, LA
G	2	Cienna Rodriguez	5 ft 4 in (1.63 m)	Fr	Cypress Ranch HS	Cypress, TX
G	3	Robbie Brown	5 ft 8 in (1.73 m)	Sr	St. Thomas More HS	Lafayette, LA
G	5	T'erika Bell	5 ft 4 in (1.63 m)	Fr	Ouachita Parish HS	Monroe, LA
G	10	Kia Wilridge	5 ft 5 in (1.65 m)	Jr	St. Thomas More HS	Crowley, LA
G	11	Jaylyn Gordon	5 ft 5 in (1.65 m)	So	West St. John HS	Edgard, LA
F	14	Adrienne Prejean	5 ft 9 in (1.75 m)	Jr	Lafayette HS	Lafayette, LA
G/F	15	Jodi Quinn	5 ft 7 in (1.7 m)	RS Fr	St. Thomas More HS	St. Martinville, LA
F	21	Jasmin Mills	6 ft 1 in (1.85 m)	Jr	Assumption HS	Belle Rose, LA
G/F	22	Gabby Alexander	5 ft 11 in (1.8 m)	So	Bogalusa HS	Bogalusa, LA
G	24	Keke Veal	5 ft 6 in (1.68 m)	Jr	St. Thomas More HS	Opelousas, LA
G	25	Sylvana Okde	5 ft 6 in (1.68 m)	Jr	Westbury Christian School	Houston, TX
F	32	Simone Fields	6 ft 0 in (1.83 m)	Fr	Converse Judson HS	San Antonio, TX
F	33	D'Rae Tullock	6 ft 2 in (1.88 m)	Fr	Middleton HS	Middleton, ID
F	51	Alexis Nezianya	5 ft 11 in (1.8 m)	Fr	Newman Smith HS	Carrollton, TX

Head coach

- Garry Boadhead (Louisiana)

Assistant coach(es)

- Deacon Jones (Louisiana)
- Sallie Guillory (Louisiana)
- Cornelius Sullivan (Memphis)

Legend

- (C) Team captain
- (S) Suspended
- (I) Ineligible
- (W) Walk-on
- Injured
- Current redshirt

Roster
Last update: March 18, 2019

== Schedule and results ==
Date time, TV	Rank^{#}	Opponent^{#}	Result	Record	High points	High rebounds	High assists	Site (attendance) city, state
Exhibition
11/05/2014*; 5:00 pm		LSU–Alexandria	W 69-44		18 – Veal	6 – Mills	3 – Tied	Cajundome (469); Lafayette, LA
11/10/2014*; 7:00 pm		Spring Hill College	W 67-47		17 – Fields	8 – Brown	3 – Rodriguez	Cajundome (269); Lafayette, LA
Non-conference regular season
11/14/2014*; 7:00 pm		at Lamar	W 75-55	1–0	22 – Gordon	8 – Alexander	5 – Veal	Montagne Center (894); Beaumont, TX
11/18/2014*; 7:00 pm		at Xavier	W 69-53	2-0	18 – Veal	9 – Prejean	7 – Gordon	Cajundome (326); Lafayette, LA
11/22/2014*; 12:00 pm		Louisiana Tech	W 58-55	3-0	18 – Wilridge	9 – Prejean	5 – Wilridge	Earl K. Long Gymnasium (487); Lafayette, LA
11/29/2017*; 2:00 pm		at Southeastern Louisiana	W 71-60	4-0	23 – Gordon	7 – Wilridge	4 – Wilridge	University Center (325); Hammond, LA
12/06/2014*; 2:00 pm		Sam Houston State	W 65-46	5-0	16 – Wilridge	5 – Alexander	3 – Rodriguez	Cajundome (269); Lafayette, LA
12/13/2014*; 4:15 pm		Southern-New Orleans	W 58-52	6-0	12 – Mills	9 – Wilridge	5 – Veal	Cajundome (365); Lafayette, LA
12/17/2014*; 11:00 am		No. 20 Mississippi State	L 51-66	6-1	17 – Veal	7 – Wilridge	2 – Wilridge	Cajundome (1,656); Lafayette, LA
12/19/2014*; 1:00 pm		at Alcorn State	W 64-57 ^{OT}	7-1	22 – Gordon	7 – Prejean	5 – Rodriguez	Davey Whitney Complex (55); Lorman, MS
12/28/2014*; 4:00 pm		Jackson State	W 65-56	8-1	15 – Veal	7 – Mills	5 – Veal	Cajundome (697); Lafayette, LA
Sun Belt regular season
12/30/2014; 5:30 pm		at Arkansas-Little Rock	L 41-67	8-2 (0-1)	14 – Gordon	5 – Veal	3 – Veal	Jack Stephens Center (1,174); Little Rock, AR
01/03/2015; 5:00 pm		Troy	L 55-60	8-3 (0-2)	16 – Brown	6 – Wilridge	3 – Gordon	Cajundome (783); Lafayette, LA
01/05/2015; 4:00 pm		at Appalachian State	L 51-63	8-4 (0-3)	17 – Veal	7 – Fields	4 – Veal	Holmes Center (315); Boone, NC
01/08/2015; 5:00 pm		Georgia State	W 68-52	9-4 (1-3)	20 – Gordon	7 – Alexander	4 – Veal	Cajundome (803); Lafayette, LA
01/15/2016; 5:00 pm		at Georgia Southern	W 69–57	10-4 (2-3)	22 – Veal	10 – Alexander	5 – Gordon	Hanner Fieldhouse (4,325); Statesboro, GA
01/17/2015; 5:00 pm		South Alabama	W 65-58	11-4 (3-3)	15 – Gordon	7 – Veal	5 – Veal	Cajundome (1,452); Lafayette, LA
01/19/2015; 5:00 pm		Louisiana-Monroe	L 60-67 ^{OT}	11-5 (3-4)	14 – Wilridge	8 – Fields	5 – Veal	Cajundome (858); Lafayette, LA
01/22/2015; 5:00 pm		Arkansas State	W 69-57	12-5 (4-4)	18 – Veal	9 – Wilridge	5 – Wilridge	Cajundome (621); Lafayette, LA
01/24/2015; 11:00 am, ESPN3		at Georgia State	W 63-56	13-5 (5-4)	18 – Gordon	8 – Wilridge	4 – Veal	GSU Sports Arena (592); Atlanta, GA
01/29/2015; 11:00 am		at South Alabama	L 47-57	13-6 (5-5)	14 – Veal	6 – Gordon	2 – Wilridge	Mitchell Center (2,096); Mobile, AL
01/31/2015; 2:00 pm		at Texas State	W 83-81 ^{2OT}	14–6 (6-5)	22 – Gordon	14 – Tied	8 – Veal	Strahan Coliseum; San Marcos, TX
02/05/2015; 5:00 pm		Appalachian State	W 70-66	15-6 (7–5)	22 – Gordon	7 – Gordon	3 – Brown	Cajundome (711); Lafayette, LA
02/07/2015; 3:15 pm		UT Arlington	L 51-57	15-7 (7-6)	15 – Veal	9 – Tied	3 – Wilridge	Cajundome (322); Lafayette, LA
02/12/2015; 5:15 pm		at Louisiana-Monroe	W 68–65 ^{2OT}	16-7 (8-6)	29 – Gordon	6 – Tied	5 – Veal	Fant-Ewing Coliseum; Monroe, LA
02/14/2015; 2:00 pm		at Troy	L 63–68	16-8 (8-7)	20 – Veal	8 – Fields	6 – Veal	Trojan Arena (412); Troy, AL
02/19/2015; 5:00 pm		Texas State	W 64-41	17-8 (9-7)	24 – Veal	8 – Tied	3 – Veal	Cajundome (693); Lafayette, LA
02/21/2015; 5:00 pm		at UT Arlington	L 42-56	17-9 (9-8)	14 – Veal	4 – Wilridge	3 – Wilridge	College Park Center (757); Arlington, TX
02/28/2015; 5:00 pm		Georgia Southern	W 62-35	18–9 (10–8)	20 – Veal	9 – Alexander	2 – Rodriguez	Cajundome (1,151); Lafayette, LA
03/05/2015; 5:00 pm		Arkansas-Little Rock	L 66-68	18–10 (10–9)	16 – Wilridge	6 – Brown	2 – Brown	Cajundome (971); Lafayette, LA
03/07/2015; 3:05 pm		at Arkansas State	L 65-87	18–11 (10–10)	16 – Veal	8 – Alexander	4 – Wilridge	Convocation Center (1,109); Jonesboro, AR
Sun Belt Women's Tournament
03/11/2015; 7:30 pm, ESPN3	(6)	vs. (3) Troy; First Round	W 66-52	19–11	20 – Veal	10 – Fields	4 – Brown	Lakefront Arena (537); New Orleans, LA
03/13/2015; 2:00 pm, ESPN3	(6)	vs. (2) Arkansas State; Semifinals	L 61-63	20-11	18 – Veal	4 – Wilridge	5 – Veal	Lakefront Arena; New Orleans, LA
Women's Basketball Invitational
03/19/2015; 7:00 pm	(2)	vs. (7) UT Pan American; First Round	W 78-56	21-11	18 – Wilridge	9 – Prejean	5 – Veal	Earl K. Long Gymnasium (1,059); Lafayette, LA
03/21/2015; 7:00 pm	(2)	vs. (6) McNeese State; Quarterfinals	W 63-58	22-11	29 – Veal	8 – Veal	2 – Wilridge	Earl K. Long Gymnasium (1,169); Lafayette, LA
03/26/2015; 6:00 pm	(2)	vs. (5) Oral Roberts; Semifinals	W 65-64	23-11	23 – Veal	5 – Veal	4 – Veal	Earl K. Long Gymnasium (513); Lafayette, LA
03/29/2015; 4:00 pm	(2)	vs. (3) Siena; Championship	W 52-50	24-11	20 – Veal	7 – Tied	4 – Gordon	Earl K. Long Gymnasium (838); Lafayette, LA
*Non-conference game. ^{#}Rankings from AP Poll. (#) Tournament seedings in parentheses. All times are in Central Time.

== See also ==
- 2014–15 Louisiana–Lafayette Ragin' Cajuns men's basketball team
