= Johnson Gymnasium =

Sports arena at the University of New Mexico

- Johnson Gymnasium
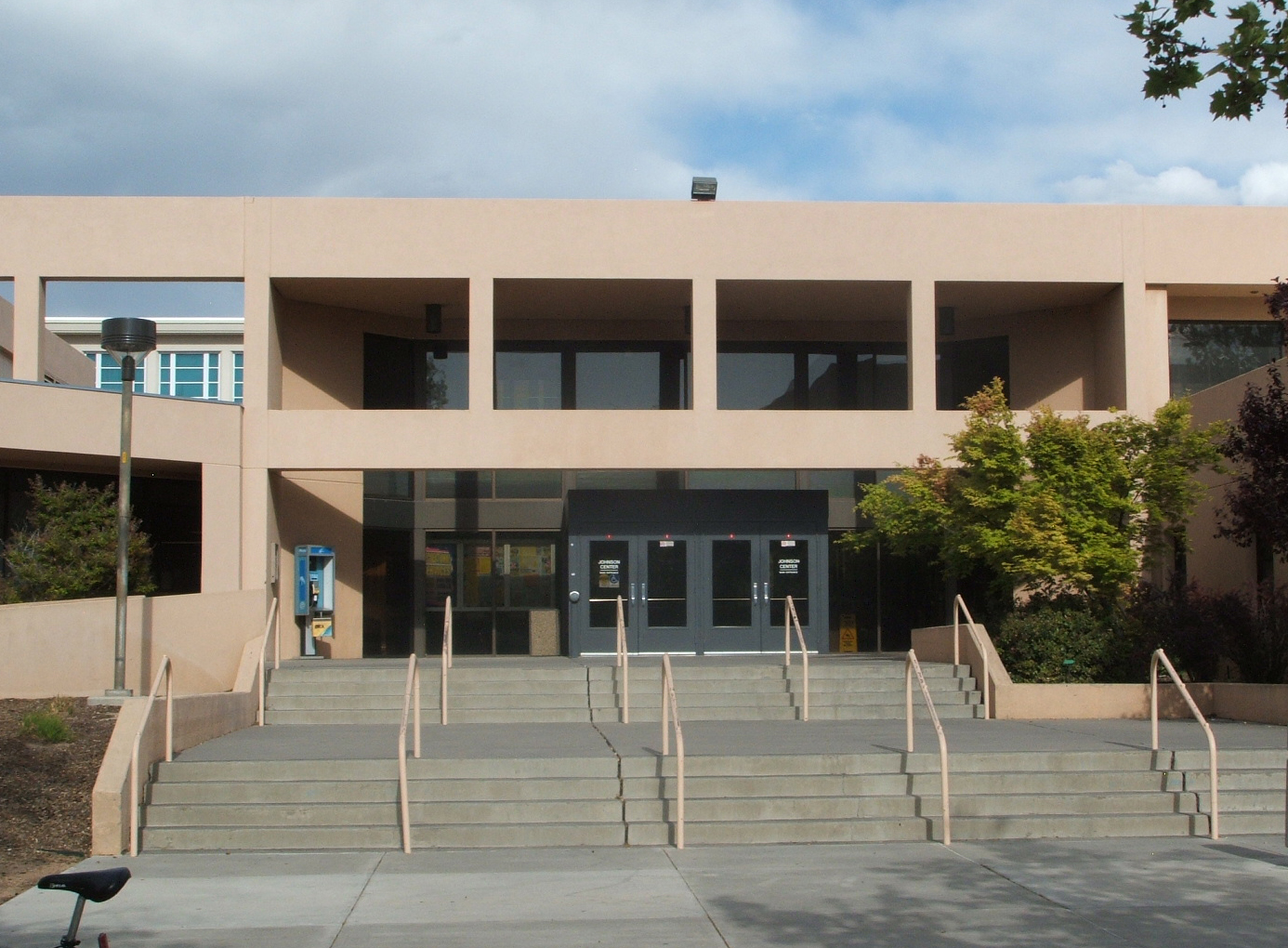
- Interactive map of Johnson Gymnasium
- Full name: Johnson Gymnasium
- Location: Albuquerque, New Mexico
- Coordinates: 35°4′57″N 106°37′5″W
- Owner: University of New Mexico
- Operator: University of New Mexico
- Capacity: 7,800 (peak) 4,000 (current)

Construction
- Opened: 1957

Tenants
- New Mexico Lobos men's basketball (1957–1966); New Mexico Lobos women's volleyball (1996–present)

Johnson Gymnasium is a 4,000-seat multi-purpose arena in Albuquerque, New Mexico, on the campus of the University of New Mexico. It opened in 1957 and was the home venue of the New Mexico Lobos basketball team until The Pit opened in 1966. Today, Johnson Gymnasium is the home floor for the Lobo volleyball team. The gym is named after former Lobos basketball coach, Roy Johnson.

On March 18, 2015, the arena hosted a New Mexico Lobos women's basketball game for the first time when the Lobos took on North Dakota in the first round of the Women's Basketball Invitational. The team's normal venue, The Pit, was not available due to a conflicting Professional Bull Riders event. The Lobos won the game and advanced to the second round where they were defeated by Oral Roberts at the same venue.
