= Garry Brodhead =

American basketball coach

Current position
- Title: Head coach
- Team: Louisiana
- Conference: Sun Belt
- Record: 220–207 (.515)

Biographical details
- Born: August 27, 1957 (age 69); Lafayette, Louisiana, U.S.
- Education: University of Southwestern Louisiana

Coaching career (HC unless noted)
- 1997–2007: Teurlings Catholic HS (LA)
- 2007–2012: McNeese State (assistant)
- 2012–present: Louisiana

Head coaching record
- Overall: 220–207 (.515) (Division I)
- Tournaments: 0–2 (Women's NIT); 8–0 (WBI)

Accomplishments and honors

Championships
- NCAA: 2× WBI Champions (2015, 2016); Sun Belt Conference West Champions (2021); High school: LHSAA Class 3A State Champions (2002)

Awards
- LSWA Class 3A Girls Basketball Coach of the Year (2002); LSWA Women's Basketball Coach of the Year (2016)

Garry Brodhead (born August 27, 1957) is the coach of the Louisiana Ragin' Cajuns women's basketball team since 2012. Before joining the University of Louisiana at Lafayette team, Brodhead worked as a farmer between 1978 and 1997. For his basketball career, Brodhead was the girls coach at Teurlings Catholic High School from 1997 to 2007. While accumulating 297 wins and 78 losses, his team won the 3A division of the Louisiana High School Athletic Association tournament in 2002. Brodhead also co-founded the Acadiana Stars girls basketball team in 1987 and the Girls World Biddy Basketball League by the mid-1990s.

For his college basketball career, Brodhead held multiple positions for the McNeese State Cowgirls basketball team from 2007 to 2012. With the Cajuns, Brodhead and his team won the Women's Basketball Invitational in 2015 and 2016. The following year, his players were second at the 2017 Sun Belt Conference women's basketball tournament. They also reached the first round of the 2021 Women's National Invitation Tournament during the postseason.

== Early life and education ==
Brodhead was born on August 27, 1957, in Lafayette, Louisiana. While at the University of Louisiana at Lafayette between the late 1970s and early 1980s, he attended a business administration program. During his time at the university, Brodhead competed in pole vaulting. As a graduate student in the mid-1990s, he was an assistant coach for their women's basketball team.

== Career ==
=== Farming ===
In 1978, Brodhead went to Youngsville, Louisiana and became a farmer. By the 1980s, Brodhead was a basketball coach while he worked in agriculture. Brodhead focused on cucumbers between the late 1980s and late 1990s. During this time period, Brodhead was the vice president of Doucet Grain in 1987. Brodhead decided to stop working as a farmer during 1997.

=== Girls basketball ===
During 1987, Brodhead created the Acadiana Stars girls basketball team with his wife. With the Stars, his Under-12 team had a fifth place tie during the 2006 AAU National Championship. By the mid-1990s, the Brodheads co-founded the Girls World Biddy Basketball League for Acadiana residents. In 1997, Brodhead became the coach for Teurlings Catholic High School's girls basketball team. By 1998, he was working for multiple basketball teams while also teaching at Teurlings.

In 2002, Brodhead and his team won the 3A division of the Louisiana High School Athletic Association tournament. At the 2004 edition, Brodhead's team was second at the 3A event. While at Teurlings Catholic, Brodhead was considered by UL to coach their women's basketball team in May 2007. After accumulating 297 wins and 78 losses, Brodhead ended his time with Teurlings Catholic the following month.

=== College basketball ===
From 2007 to 2012, Brodhead worked with the McNeese State Cowgirls basketball team. While with McNesese State as an assistant coach, he also became their associate head coach during the 2010s. In April 2012, Brodhead became the coach of the women's basketball team at UL Lafayette. During the 2020-21 Sun Belt Conference season, Brodhead's players had their "first regular season championship in the team's 50-year history".

As a Women's Basketball Invitational competitor, Brodhead and UL won the event in 2015. The team re-won the WBI the following year. His Louisiana Ragin' Cajuns women's basketball team were second at the 2017 Sun Belt Conference women's basketball tournament. At the Women's National Invitation Tournament, Brodhead's team reached the first round of the 2021 postseason event.

== Head coaching record ==
Record table
Season	Team	Overall	Conference	Standing	Postseason
Louisiana Ragin' Cajuns (Sun Belt Conference) (2012–present)
2012–13	Louisiana–Lafayette	10–21	3–17	6th (West)	
2013–14	Louisiana–Lafayette	14–16	7–11	T–7th	
2014–15	Louisiana–Lafayette	23–12	10–10	6th	WBI Champions
2015–16	Louisiana–Lafayette	25–10	13–7	3rd	WBI Champions
2016–17	Louisiana–Lafayette	20–11	11–7	T–4th	
2017–18	Louisiana	17–16	10–8	T–6th	
2018–19	Louisiana	7–23	5–13	10th	
2019–20	Louisiana	19–12	10–8	4th	
2020–21	Louisiana	16–8	13–1	1st (West)	WNIT Consolation First Round
2021–22	Louisiana	18–7	9–4	3rd	
2022–23	Louisiana	16–15	10–8	7th	
2023–24	Louisiana	17–14	10–8	T–5th	
2024–25	Louisiana	13–16	9–9	T–5th	
2025–26	Louisiana	5–26	2–16	14th	
Louisiana:		220–207 (.515)	122–120 (.504)		
Total:		220–207 (.515)			
National champion Postseason invitational champion Conference regular season champion Conference regular season and conference tournament champion Division regular season champion Division regular season and conference tournament champion Conference tournament champion

== Honors and personal life ==
While with Teurlings Catholic, the Louisiana Sports Writers Association chose him as the 2002 girls basketball Coach of the Year for 3A schools. In 2016, he was the LSWA's Coach of the Year for women's basketball teams during his time at UL Lafayette. He had three children during his marriage.
