= Troy Trojans basketball =

Troy Trojans basketball may refer to either of the basketball teams that represent Troy University:

- Troy Trojans men's basketball
- Troy Trojans women's basketball
