= Louisiana Ragin' Cajuns basketball =

Louisiana Ragin' Cajuns basketball may refer to either of the basketball teams that represent the University of Louisiana at Lafayette:

- Louisiana Ragin' Cajuns men's basketball
- Louisiana Ragin' Cajuns women's basketball
