= 2014–15 Georgia State Panthers women's basketball team =

Intercollegiate basketball season

2014–15 Georgia State Panthers women's basketball
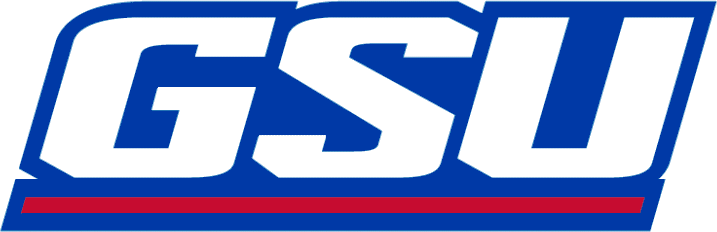
- Conference: Sun Belt Conference
- Record: 13–17 (8–12 Sun Belt)
- Head coach: Sharon Baldwin-Tener (5th season)
- Assistant coaches: Erin Batth (1st season); Jeri Porter (1st season)
- Home arena: GSU Sports Arena (Capacity: 4,500)

2014–15 Sun Belt Conference women's basketball standings
	Conf.				Overall
Team	W		L	PCT	W		L	PCT
Arkansas–Little Rock †	18	–	2	.900	25	–	4	.862
Arkansas State	16	–	4	.800	21	–	9	.700
Troy	15	–	5	.750	20	–	9	.690
UT Arlington	11	–	9	.550	17	–	12	.586
Texas State	11	–	9	.550	16	–	13	.552
Louisiana–Lafayette	10	–	10	.500	18	–	11	.621
Appalachian State	9	–	11	.450	14	–	15	.483
Georgia State	8	–	12	.400	13	–	16	.448
Louisiana–Monroe	8	–	12	.400	12	–	17	.414
Georgia Southern	2	–	18	.100	5	–	24	.172
South Alabama	2	–	18	.100	5	–	24	.172
† 2015 Sun Belt tournament winner

The 2014–15 Georgia State Panthers women's basketball team represented Georgia State University in the 2014–15 NCAA Division I women's basketball season. The Panthers, coached by Sharon Baldwin-Tener, were a member of the Sun Belt Conference, and played their home games on campus at the GSU Sports Arena.

== 2014–15 Roster ==
2013–14 Georgia State Panthers women's basketball team
Players
Coaches

Pos.	#	Name	Height	Year	Previous school	Hometown
G	1	Mariam Hannoun	5 ft 10 in (1.78 m)	So	Ironi Nahariya	Nahariya, Israel
G/F	2	Miranda Smith	5 ft 9 in (1.75 m)	Sr	Patrick Henry High School	Roanoke, Va.
G	5	Alisha Andrews	4 ft 11 in (1.5 m)	RS Sr	Redan High School	Stone Mountain, Ga.
G	10	Makeba Ponder	5 ft 8 in (1.73 m)	Fr	Colquitt County High School	Moultrie, Ga
F/C	11	Ashanti Groover	6 ft 2 in (1.88 m)	So	Bartow High School	Bartow, Fla.
G	12	Ashlee Cole	5 ft 8 in (1.73 m)	Jr	Forest Park High School	Ellenwood, Ga.
C	13	Brittany Logan	6 ft 4 in (1.93 m)	Sr	Georgia Perimeter College	Decatur, Ga.
G	20	Kayla Nolan	5 ft 8 in (1.73 m)	Sr	Duluth High School	Duluth, Ga.
F	21	Morgan Jackson	6 ft 0 in (1.83 m)	Jr	East Hall High School	Gainesville, Ga.
F/C	22	Jamila Mayfield	6 ft 4 in (1.93 m)	So	Howard High School	Macon, Ga.
G	23	Ashley Watson	5 ft 6 in (1.68 m)	Sr	Archbishop Mitty High School	San Jose, Calif.
G	24	Gaby Moss	5 ft 8 in (1.73 m)	Jr	T. C. Williams High School	Alexandria, Va.
F	25	Kanesha Nichols	5 ft 11 in (1.8 m)	Fr	Ensworth High School	Smryna Tn.
F/C	32	Haley Gerrin	6 ft 2 in (1.88 m)	So	Habersham Central High School	Clarksville, Ga.
G	33	Tattiana Jackson	5 ft 10 in (1.78 m)	Jr	Chattanooga High School	Atlanta, Ga.

Head coach

Sharon Baldwin-Tener

Assistant coach(es)

Erin Batth
Jeri Porter

Legend

- (C) Team captain
- (S) Suspended
- (I) Ineligible
- (W) Walk-on
- Injured
- Current redshirt

Roster
Last update: 2014-10-06

== 2014–15 Schedule ==
Date time, TV	Rank^{#}	Opponent^{#}	Result	Record	Site (attendance) city, state
Exhibition
November 6*; 7:00 pm		Montevallo			GSU Sports Arena; Atlanta, GA
Regular Season
November 15*; 7:00 pm		at North Florida	W 72–59	1–0	UNF Arena; Jacksonville, FL
November 24*; 7:00 pm		Thomas	W 101–55	2–0	GSU Sports Arena; Atlanta, GA
November 28*; 4:00 pm		Samford; GSU Thanksgiving Tournament	W 61–56	3–0	GSU Sports Arena; Atlanta, GA
November 30*; 2:30 pm		Liberty; GSU Thanksgiving Tournament	L 71–73	3–1	GSU Sports Arena; Atlanta, GA
December 3*; 7:00 pm		Kennesaw State	L 64–73	3–2	GSU Sports Arena (503); Atlanta, GA
December 7*; 2:00 pm		at Morehead State	L 72–74	3–3	Ellis Johnson Arena; Morehead, KY
December 13*; 2:00 pm		Tennessee Tech	W 72–60	4–3	GSU Sports Arena; Atlanta, GA
December 19*; 5:00 pm		UMass; GSU Holiday and Hoops Classic	W 71–66	5–3	GSU Sports Arena; Atlanta, GA
December 20*; 6:00 pm		LaSalle; GSU Holiday and Hoops Classic	L 68–76	5–4	GSU Sports Arena; Atlanta, GA
December 30; 5:00 pm		Louisiana–Monroe	W 80–72	6–4 (1–0)	GSU Sports Arena; Atlanta, GA
January 3; 12:00 pm		Arkansas–Little Rock	L 55–75	6–5 (1–1)	GSU Sports Arena; Atlanta, GA
January 5; 5:00 pm		Texas State	W 74–69	7–5 (2–1)	GSU Sports Arena; Atlanta, GA
January 8; 6:00 pm		at Louisiana–Lafayette	L 52–68	7–6 (2–2)	Earl K. Long Gymnasium; Lafayette, LA
January 10; 12:00 pm		Troy	L 87–96	7–7 (2–3)	GSU Sports Arena; Atlanta, GA
January 15; 5:00 pm		Texas–Arlington	L 39–45	7–8 (2–4)	GSU Sports Arena; Atlanta, GA
January 17; 2:00 pm		at Appalachian State	W 76–71	8–8 (3–4)	Holmes Center; Boone, NC
January 19; 6:00 pm		at Arkansas State	L 65–76	8–9 (3–5)	Convocation Center; Jonesboro, AR
January 24; 2:00 pm, ESPN3		Louisiana–Lafayette	L 56–63	8–10 (3–6)	GSU Sports Arena; Atlanta, GA
January 29; 2:00 pm		at Texas–Arlington	L 45–57	8–11 (3–7)	College Park Center; Arlington, TX
January 31; 2:00 pm		Arkansas State	L 47–61	8–12 (3–8)	GSU Sports Arena; Atlanta, GA
February 5; 5:00 pm		at Georgia Southern	W 82-54	9-12 (4-8)	Hanner Fieldhouse; Statesboro, GA
February; 3:00 pm		at South Alabama	W 84-78	10-12 (5-8)	Mitchell Center; Mobile, AL
February 14; 3:00 pm		at Texas State	L 61-71	10-13 (5-9)	Strahan Coliseum; San Marcos, TX
February 19; 5:00 pm		South Alabama	W 84-78	11-13 (6-9)	GSU Sports Arena; Atlanta, GA
February 21; 12:00 pm		Appalachian State; Play4Kay Cancer Awareness Game	W 80-70	12-13 (7-9)	GSU Sports Arena; Atlanta, GA
February 26; 6:30 pm		at Arkansas–Little Rock	L 39-56	12-14 (7-10)	Jack Stephens Center; Little Rock, AR
February 26; 6:30 pm		at Troy	L 75-88	12-15 (7-11)	Trojan Arena; Troy, AL
March 5; 6:00 pm		at Louisiana–Monroe	W 66-61	13-15 (8-11)	Fant–Ewing Coliseum; Monroe, LA
March 7; 12:00 pm		Georgia Southern	L 74-82	13-16 (8-12)	GSU Sports Arena; Atlanta, GA
2015 Sun Belt Tournament
March 11; 6:00 pm, ESPN3	(8)	vs. (1) Arkansas–Little Rock; Sun Belt Conference tournament First Round	L 54-71	13-17	Lakefront Arena; New Orleans, LA
*Non-conference game. ^{#}Rankings from AP Poll. (#) Tournament seedings in parentheses. All times are in Eastern Time.
