= Lyle Mouton =

American baseball player (born 1969)

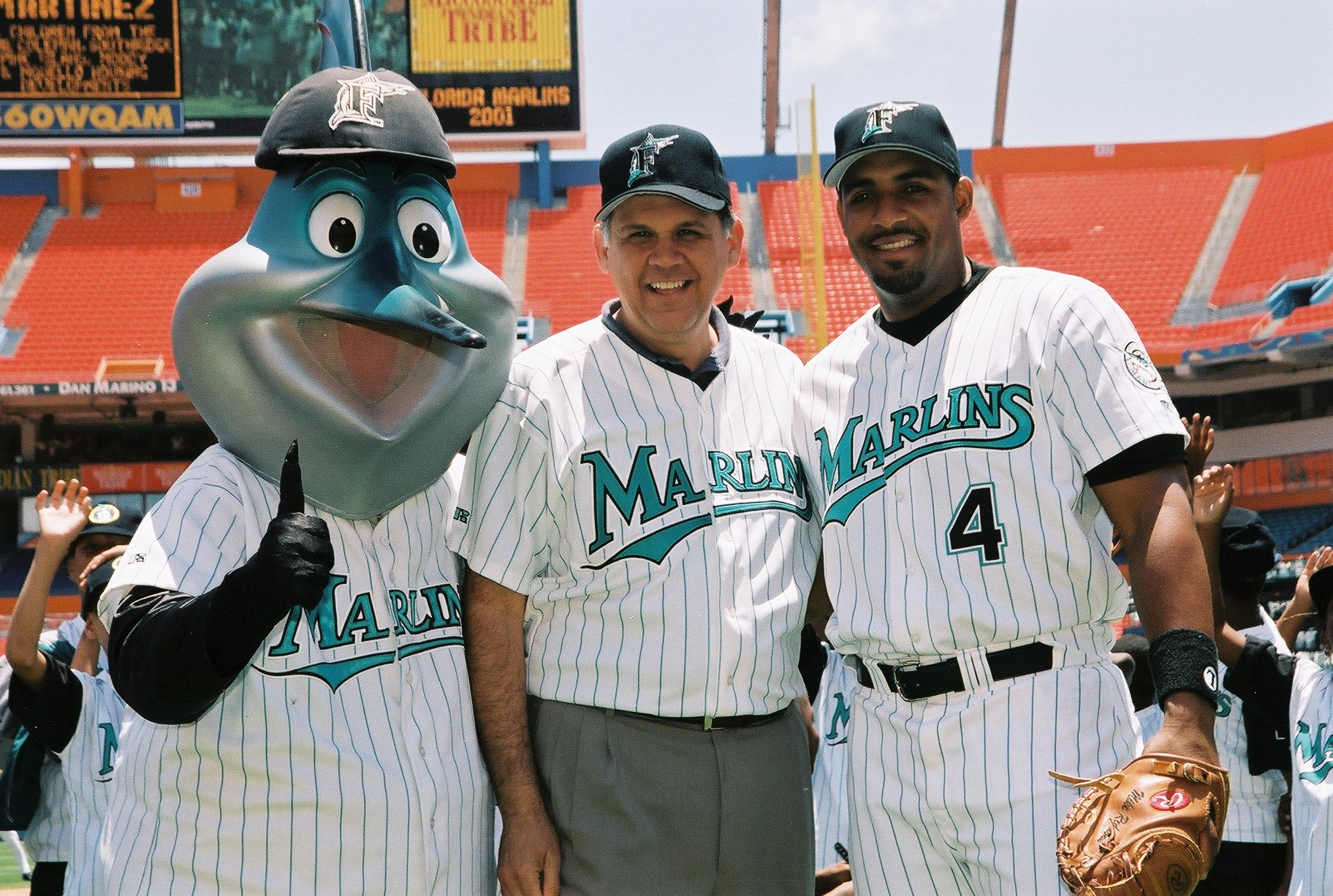
- Mouton (right) with Billy the Marlin and Mel Martínez in 2001
- Outfielder
- Born: May 13, 1969 (age 57); Lafayette, Louisiana, U.S.
- Batted: Right Threw: Right

Professional debut
- MLB: June 7, 1995, for the Chicago White Sox
- NPB: April 3, 1998, for the Yakult Swallows

Last appearance
- NPB: June 12, 1998, for the Yakult Swallows
- MLB: May 19, 2001, for the Florida Marlins

MLB statistics
- Batting average: .280
- Home runs: 22
- Runs batted in: 116

NPB statistics
- Batting average: .241
- Home runs: 3
- Runs batted in: 12
- Stats at Baseball Reference

Teams
- Chicago White Sox (1995–1997); Yakult Swallows (1998); Baltimore Orioles (1998); Milwaukee Brewers (1999–2000); Florida Marlins (2001)

Lyle Joseph Mouton (born May 13, 1969) is an American former professional baseball player who played outfield in the Major Leagues from 1995 to 2001. He also played part of 1998 in Japan for the Yakult Swallows.

Mouton attended St. Thomas More School in Lafayette.

Drafted in the fifth round of the 1991 amateur draft by the New York Yankees, Mouton was sent to the Chicago White Sox on April 22, 1995 as the player-to-be-named-later to complete a trade for 1993 AL Cy Young Award winner Jack McDowell. Mouton went on to play 7 years in the Major Leagues, from 1995 to 2001, spending three seasons with the White Sox one with the Baltimore Orioles, two with the Milwaukee Brewers, and one with the Florida Marlins. He finished his MLB career with a .280 batting average, .759 OPS, 22 homeruns, and 116 RBI and 1.7 WAR in 328 games and 890 plate appearances.

== College ==
Lyle originally entered school at LSU on a basketball scholarship and played as a guard. After two seasons, he focused solely on baseball, playing outfield for the LSU Tigers from 1989 to 1991. He led the Tigers to three straight College World Series tournaments, with the team winning the championship in 1991. He also led them to back-to-back SEC championships, 1990–91. He was on the 1990 All-Tournament College World Series team as a designated hitter, then again for the 1991 tournament as an outfielder. In 1990, he played collegiate summer baseball with the Brewster Whitecaps of the Cape Cod Baseball League and was named a league all-star.
