= Chelsea Dungee =

American basketball player (born 1997)

Alabama Crimson Tide
- League: Southeastern Conference

Personal information
- Born: May 11, 1997 (age 29) Okmulgee, Oklahoma, U.S.
- Listed height: 5 ft 10 in (1.78 m)
- Listed weight: 165 lb (75 kg)

Career information
- High school: Sapulpa (Sapulpa, Oklahoma)
- College: Oklahoma (2016–2017); Arkansas (2018–2021)
- WNBA draft: 2021: 1st round, 5th overall pick
- Drafted by: Dallas Wings
- Playing career: 2021–present

Career history

Playing
- 2021: Dallas Wings
- 2021: Galatasaray
- 2021: Sydney Uni Flames

Coaching
- 2022–2024: Troy (assistant)
- 2024–2025: Tulsa (assistant)
- 2025–present: Alabama (assistant)

Career highlights
- WBCA All-American (2021); Third-team All-American – AP, USBWA (2021); First-team All-SEC (2021); Big 12 All-Freshman Team (2017)
- Stats at Basketball Reference
Medals
Women's basketball
Representing the United States
FIBA Americas Under-16 Championship
Gold medal – first place	2013 Mexico	Team

Chelsea Dungee (born May 11, 1997) is an American basketball player who is an assistant coach for the Alabama Crimson Tide women's basketball team. She played college basketball at Oklahoma for one season and Arkansas for four seasons.

== High school ==
Dungee played two years each at Preston High School, in Preston, Oklahoma, and Sapulpa High School, in Sapulpa, Oklahoma. During her time at Preston, she helped the team to the OSSAA class AA state championship, averaging over 25 points per game. Following her sophomore season, she was named Gatorade State Player of the Year for the state of Oklahoma.

== College career ==
Dungee played her freshman season at Oklahoma before transferring to Arkansas for her final three varsity seasons. She was named an All-American by the Associated Press and the WBCA as a senior.

=== Oklahoma and Arkansas statistics ===
Legend
GP	Games played	GS	Games started	MPG	Minutes per game
FG%	Field goal percentage	3P%	3-point field goal percentage	FT%	Free throw percentage
RPG	Rebounds per game	APG	Assists per game	SPG	Steals per game
BPG	Blocks per game	PPG	Points per game	**Bold**	Career high

Year	Team	GP	Points	FG%	3P%	FT%	RPG	APG	SPG	BPG	PPG
2016–17	Oklahoma	33	244	37.9%	33.8%	81.1%	2.5	0.8	0.6	0.2	7.4
2017–18	Arkansas	Sat due to NCAA transfer rules									
2018–19	Arkansas	**37**	**759**	40.4%	35.1%	**83.3%**	4.3	**1.6**	1.3	**0.4**	20.5
2019–20	Arkansas	32	541	37.3%	32.7%	77.2%	**4.8**	1.6	1.5	0.4	16.9
2020–21	Arkansas	27	603	**42.4%**	**38.7%**	79.0%	3.9	1.5	**1.5**	0.3	**22.3**
Career		129	2147	39.8%	35.2%	80.3%	3.9	1.4	1.2	0.3	16.6

== WNBA career statistics ==
Legend
GP	Games played	GS	Games started	MPG	Minutes per game	RPG	Rebounds per game
APG	Assists per game	SPG	Steals per game	BPG	Blocks per game	PPG	Points per game
TO	Turnovers per game	FG%	Field-goal percentage	3P%	3-point field-goal percentage	FT%	Free-throw percentage
**Bold**	Career best	°	League leader

=== Regular season ===
Year	Team	GP	GS	MPG	FG%	3P%	FT%	RPG	APG	SPG	BPG	TO	PPG
2021	Dallas	14	0	4.6	.176	.200	.000	0.2	0.1	0.0	0.1	0.1	0.6
Career	1 year, 1 team	14	0	4.6	.176	.200	.000	0.2	0.1	0.0	0.1	0.1	0.6

=== Playoffs ===
Year	Team	GP	GS	MPG	FG%	3P%	FT%	RPG	APG	SPG	BPG	TO	PPG
2021	Dallas	1	0	1.0	.000	.000	.000	0.0	0.0	0.0	0.0	0.0	0.0
Career	1 year, 1 team	1	0	1.0	.000	.000	.000	0.0	0.0	0.0	0.0	0.0	0.0

== Overseas career ==
On 20 May 2021, she signed a one-year contract with Galatasaray.
