= Brandon Mouton =

American basketball player (born 1981)

Personal information
- Born: August 18, 1981 (age 45) Mount Kisco, New York, U.S.
- Listed height: 6 ft 4 in (1.93 m)
- Listed weight: 205 lb (93 kg)

Career information
- High school: St. Thomas More Catholic (Lafayette, Louisiana)
- College: Texas (2000–2004)
- NBA draft: 2004: undrafted
- Position: Shooting guard / small forward

Career highlights
- First-team All-Big 12 – Media (2004); Second-team All-Big 12 – Coaches (2004); Third-team All-Big 12 – Coaches (2003)

Brandon Prescott Mouton (born August 18, 1981) is an American former college basketball player. After playing high school basketball at St. Thomas More Catholic in Lafayette, Louisiana, Mouton signed to play for the Texas Longhorns, being a part of the team that reached the 2003 NCAA Tournament Final Four. In August 2003 he participated in the XIV Pan American Games in the Dominican Republic with the United States men's national basketball team, starting all 5 games. After his senior year in college, during which he earned first-team all-conference honors, he went undrafted in the 2004 NBA draft and after playing in the 2004 NBA Summer League with the Los Angeles Clippers he did not pursue a professional career in basketball.

== High school career ==
Mouton was born in Mount Kisco, Westchester County, New York, to Joseph Mouton and Gertrude Butler. He lived with his family in Gates County, North Carolina and moved to Louisiana when he was in the 8th grade. He then enrolled at St. Thomas More Catholic High School in Lafayette and as a sophomore in 1997–98 he averaged 18.6 points and 9 rebounds per game. That year his team was District champion, and Mouton was named District 5-4A Most Valuable Player and was an All-District First Team selection. His success at District level also earned him an All-State selection. USA Today selected him as an Honorable Mention All-American.

In his junior year Mouton averaged 21.1 points and 9.8 rebounds per game, again he was named in the All-District and All-State first teams, he was District MVP, and he participated in the state championship game in 1999 (runner-up). USA Today also named him an Honorable Mention All-American for the second year in a row. In the summer preceding his senior year he participated in the AAU Big Time Tournament in Las Vegas playing for the New Orleans Jazz, scoring 33 points in the title game and winning the tournament. In July 1999 he participated in the ABCD Camp for the best high school players in the nation, averaging 9.8 points, 3.4 rebounds and 0.6 assists per game during the event.

He was ranked the 82nd best player in his class by Hoop Scoop going into his senior year, while ESPN.com ranked him as the 40th best player and the 7th best wing guard of the 2000 class. Bob Gibbons ranked him as the 32nd best prospect and he was the 50th best player according to the Recruiting Services Consensus Index. He ended his senior season earning District MVP and All-State first team honors, averaging 24 points, 8 rebounds and 2.5 blocks per game. He was also named MVP of the Louisiana High School Coaches Association All-Star Game played on July 23, 2000, during which he scored 24 points. Street & Smith named him an Honorable Mention All-American for his senior year. He ended his career at St. Thomas More with more than 1,000 points scored.

== College career ==
=== Freshman season ===
Mouton was recruited by several NCAA Division I schools: he had visits with Louisiana-Lafayette, LSU, Purdue, Southern Miss and Texas, and received interest from top programs such as Kansas, Kentucky, Michigan, Syracuse and UConn. He reduced his three top schools to Louisiana-Lafayette, Purdue, and Texas, he committed to play for Texas in October 1999 and signed in November.

Mouton chose to wear jersey number 3 and in his freshman year he was primarily used as Maurice Evans' backup in the small forward position. On November 22, 2000, he scored a season-high 18 points along with 5 rebounds, 3 assists and 3 steals against Duke at the Madison Square Garden. On January 10, 2001, he recorded his season high in rebounds with 9 in a game against Kansas State. He played 20.3 minutes per game and averaged 5.4 points, 2.3 rebounds and 1.3 assists over 34 appearances (6 starts). He was the 6th best scorer on the team and he ranked 2nd in 3-point shooting percentage with 37.3%, behind Maurice Evans (38.9%). He played 16 minutes in the 2001 NCAA tournament loss against Temple, scoring 5 points.

=== Sophomore season ===
Mouton's sophomore season saw him earning a starting role in the rotation, after Evans declared for the 2001 NBA draft. His increased presence on the court saw him significantly improve his scoring averaged to 13.7 points per game (the 9th highest increase in Longhorns history). On November 17, 2001, he scored 15 points and posted 9 rebounds against Arizona in the first game of the season. He recorded a new career-high 22 points against Baylor on January 12, and further improved his personal high on February 2, when he scored 26 points (5 three-pointers) against Oklahoma. He averaged 16.5 points during conference play, shooting 41.6% from three. He ended the season with averages of 13.7 points (2nd on the team behind Chris Owens), 4.6 rebounds and 1.3 assists per game while shooting 39.4% from three (which at the time was the 7th best single-season performance in Longhorns history). Mouton appeared again in the NCAA tournament in 2002, starting all 3 games, scoring 9 points along with 6 rebounds in the first game against Boston College, and 8 points in the loss against Oregon.

=== Junior season ===
For his junior year Mouton was confirmed in the starting five by coach Rick Barnes, and in the first five games of the season he scored at least 10 points. On February 15, 2003, he recorded 24 points against Nebraska, and on March 1 he reached the 1,000 points milestone in a game against Texas Tech, during which he scored 20 points. Mouton was the 2nd best scorer on the team with 14.8 points per game (behind T. J. Ford's 15.0), 4th best rebounder (4.3) and was the 2nd player for minutes per game average with 30.1 (again behind Ford). Mouton was one of Texas' top players during the 2003 NCAA tournament: he averaged 17.8 points, leading the team in scoring, and his 21.5 points per game during the Regional phase earned him a spot in the All-Region team. In the first game of the season against UNC Asheville on March 21, 2003, he recorded 15 points and 6 rebounds, followed by 6 points against Purdue on March 23. In the NCAA Sweet Sixteen game against UConn Mouton recorded a career-high 27 points while shooting 4/7 (57.1%) from three-point range. In the Final Four game against Syracuse, he scored a team-best 25 points while shooting 55.6% from three (5-for-9). At the end of the season he received several accolades: he was named team co-MVP (with T. J. Ford) and Most Improved Player by the Longhorns, was a third-team all-conference selections by the coaches, while the media named him an All-Big 12 honorable mention; he was also named in the NABC All-District second team.

=== Senior season ===
In the summer of 2003 Mouton participated in the Pan American Games, and he suffered an injury that he battled throughout his senior season. In the summer of 2003 he was named in the list of preseason candidates for the John R. Wooden Award. Mouton was one of the players who joined the Texas Longhorns in 2000 and decided to return to the team for their senior season: with him, Brian Boddicker, Royal Ivey and James Thomas, who were all part of the rotation during the previous year participation in the Final Four. Mouton scored 20 points on November 24, 2003, against Sam Houston State, and on December 4 against Wofford; he did not play on January 2 against UT Arlington, missing the first game of his career at Texas after 109 consecutive appearances. On January 26, 2004, he scored a buzzer beater three-pointer against Texas Tech, bringing the game to overtime: Texas later won 62–61. On February 14, 2004, Mouton recorded his career-high in points with 29 against Iowa State, and then scored 25 points against Oklahoma: these performances earned him the Big 12 Player of the Week award on February 23. During the Big 12 tournament Mouton averaged 13.3 points and 4.3 rebounds (including an 18-points performance against Kansas), and earned All-Tournament honors. For the fourth consecutive time in his career Mouton participated in the NCAA tournament: he scored 23 points in 39 minutes against Princeton, 12 points against North Carolina and 21 against Xavier, for an average of 18.7. At the end of the season he was the team's leading scorer (13.9 points per game), averaging a team-best 30 minutes per game. He was named in the All-Big 12 First Team by the media, and in the Second Team by the coaches.

He ended his career at Texas with 1,582 total points scored, which at the time earned him the 8th spot in the all-time scoring list; his 133 career games ranked 3rd all-time. He was also a proficient 3-point shooter, with his career percentage of 38.9% ranking 4th all-time when he retired (8th as of 2019). Bleacher Report included him in the Top 50 players in Longhorns history, ranking him at No. 30.

After the end of his senior season Mouton was automatically eligible for the 2004 NBA draft, but went undrafted. He was selected in the 2nd round of the 2004 CBA draft by the Great Lakes Storm, but did not sign with the team. He joined the Los Angeles Clippers for the 2004 NBA Summer League, but he did not make the final roster and did not play in the NBA.

=== College statistics ===
Year	Team	GP	GS	MPG	FG%	3P%	FT%	RPG	APG	SPG	BPG	PPG
2000–01	Texas	34	6	20.3	.394	.373	.500	2.3	1.3	0.6	0.3	5.4
2001–02	Texas	34	34	30.2	.412	.394	.756	4.6	1.3	0.8	0.4	13.7
2002–03	Texas	33	33	30.1	.439	.413	.667	4.2	1.7	1.0	0.3	14.8
2003–04	Texas	32	32	30.0	.423	.367	.720	3.5	1.4	1.2	0.3	13.9
Career		133	105	27.7	.421	.389	.682	3.6	1.4	0.9	0.3	11.9

== National team career ==
Mouton was selected by Tom Izzo to be a part of the USA squad for the 2003 Pan American Games. He started all 5 games during the tournament, finishing as the 6th best scorer in the team with 7.2 points per game: he scored 9 points against Puerto Rico in the preliminary round, and in the bronze medal game against Puerto Rico he recorded 7 points and 10 rebounds. During the tournament he suffered a sprained ankle.
