= 2014–15 University of North Dakota women's basketball team =

Intercollegiate basketball season

2014–15 University of North Dakota women's basketball

WBI, First Round
- Conference: Big Sky Conference
- Record: 17–15 (9–9 Big Sky)
- Head coach: Travis Brewster (3rd season)
- Assistant coaches: Adam Jacobson; Mallory Youngblut; Jackie Voigt
- Home arena: Betty Engelstad Sioux Center

2014–15 Big Sky women's basketball standings
	Conf.				Overall
Team	W		L	PCT	W		L	PCT
Montana†	14	–	4	.778	24	–	9	.727
Sacramento State	13	–	5	.722	18	–	16	.529
Eastern Washington	12	–	6	.667	21	–	12	.636
Northern Colorado	12	–	6	.667	22	–	13	.629
North Dakota	9	–	9	.500	17	–	15	.531
Montana State	9	–	9	.500	15	–	15	.500
Northern Arizona	9	–	9	.500	13	–	17	.433
Idaho	8	–	10	.444	14	–	15	.483
Idaho State	8	–	10	.444	13	–	17	.433
Southern Utah	6	–	12	.333	13	–	15	.464
Weber State	6	–	12	.333	11	–	18	.379
Portland State	2	–	16	.111	4	–	25	.138
† 2015 Big Sky tournament winner As of March 26, 2015; Rankings from AP poll

The 2014–15 University of North Dakota women's basketball team represented the University of North Dakota during the 2014–15 NCAA Division I women's basketball season. They were led by third-year head coach Travis Brewster and played their home games at the Betty Engelstad Sioux Center. They were members of the Big Sky Conference. They finished the season 17–15, 9–9 in Big Sky play to finish in a three-way tie for fifth place. They lost in the quarterfinals of the Big Sky women's tournament to Northern Colorado. They were invited to the Women's Basketball Invitational, where they lost to New Mexico in the first round.

== Roster ==
2014–15 North Dakota Fighting Sioux women's basketball team
Players
Coaches

Pos.	#	Name	Height	Year	Previous school	Hometown
G	1	Leah Szabla	5 ft 9 in (1.75 m)	So	Providence Academy	Brooklyn Park, MN
F	2	Mia Loyd	5 ft 11 in (1.8 m)	Jr	DeLaSalle HS	Minneapolis, MN
G	3	Katie Klapprodt	5 ft 3 in (1.6 m)	RS So	Stevens HS	Rapid City, SD
G	4	Siri Burck	6 ft 0 in (1.83 m)	RS Sr	Fargo South HS	Fargo, ND
F	5	Samantha Roscoe	6 ft 3 in (1.91 m)	So	Newman College	Perth, Western Australia
G	10	Makailah Dyer	5 ft 9 in (1.75 m)	RS So	East HS; Wisconsin	Madison, WI
G	11	Grace Sawatzke	5 ft 9 in (1.75 m)	Fr	Monticello HS	Monticello, MN
G/F	12	Cassie Thompson	5 ft 10 in (1.78 m)	So	Grafton HS; Northern State	Grafton, ND
G	15	Kelsey Knox	5 ft 7 in (1.7 m)	Jr	Platte City HS; Johnson County CC	Platte City, MO
G	21	Ellie Ripplinger	5 ft 5 in (1.65 m)	So	Red River HS	Grand Forks, ND
F	22	Josie Dillon	6 ft 1 in (1.85 m)	Jr	Benilde-St. Margaret's	Plymouth, MN
C	23	Emily Evers	6 ft 5 in (1.96 m)	RS Sr	Red River HS	Grand Forks, ND
G	24	Bailey Strand	5 ft 10 in (1.78 m)	Fr	Kennedy Secondary	Fergus Falls, MN
G	32	Josie Buckley	6 ft 0 in (1.83 m)	Fr	Rice Lake HS	Rice Lake, WI
F	34	Megan Lauck	6 ft 1 in (1.85 m)	RS Sr	Mounds View HS	Shoreview, WI
C	40	Ellen Kiser	6 ft 2 in (1.88 m)	RS So	Juda HS	Juda, WI
F	45	Jordan Meyer	6 ft 2 in (1.88 m)	Fr	Anoka HS	Anoka, MN
C	52	Emily Thompson	6 ft 2 in (1.88 m)	Jr	Carrington HS	Carrington, ND

Head coach

- Travis Brewster

Assistant coach(es)

- Adam Jacobson
- Mallory Youngblut
- Jackie Voigt

Legend

- (C) Team captain
- (S) Suspended
- (I) Ineligible
- (W) Walk-on
- Injured
- Current redshirt

Roster

== Schedule ==
Date time, TV	Rank^{#}	Opponent^{#}	Result	Record	Site (attendance) city, state
Exhibition
11/02/2014*; 2:00 pm		Memidji State	W 79–42	–	Betty Engelstad Sioux Center (1,509); Grand Forks, ND
11/09/2014*; 2:00 pm		Minnesota Crookston	W 70–50	–	Betty Engelstad Sioux Center (1,439); Grand Forks, ND
Regular season
11/15/2014*; 7:00 pm		at Colorado; Preseason WNIT First Round	L 59–68	0–1	Coors Events Center (1,875); Boulder, CO
11/18/2014*; 8:00 pm, MidcoSN		at Milwaukee	W 83–76	1–1	Betty Engelstad Sioux Center (N/A); Grand Forks, ND
11/21/2014*; 3:00 pm		vs. St. Francis Brooklyn; Preseason WNIT Consolation Round	W 70–63	2–1	SECU Arena (100); Towson, MD
11/22/2014*; 5:30 pm		at Towson; Preseason WNIT Consolation Round	W 54–52	3–1	SECU Arena (290); Towson, MD
11/26/2014*; 2:00 pm		at Omaha	W 72–52	4–1	Lee & Helene Sapp Fieldhouse (126); Omaha, NE
11/29/2014*; 4:30 pm		at Western Illinois	W 85–77	5–1	Western Hall (958); Macomb, IL
12/02/2014*; 7:00 pm		Dickinson State	W 88–40	6–1	Betty Engelstad Sioux Center (1,312); Grand Forks, ND
12/06/2014*; 7:00 pm, NBCND		at North Dakota State	W 90–87 ^{OT}	7–1	Scheels Arena (1,469); Fargo, ND
12/10/2014*; 7:00 pm, FSNOR+		Minnesota	L 55–68	7–2	Betty Engelstad Sioux Center (1,469); Grand Forks, ND
12/13/2014*; 6:00 pm		at Clemson	L 67–72	7–3	Littlejohn Coliseum (702); Clemson, SC
12/16/2014*; 7:00 pm		Mayville State	W 98–54	8–3	Betty Engelstad Sioux Center (1,323); Grand Forks, ND
12/21/2014*; 2:00 pm		at South Dakota	L 81–86	8–4	DakotaDome (1,473); Vermillion, SD
01/01/2015; 7:00 pm		Montana State	W 82–74	9–4 (1–0)	Betty Engelstad Sioux Center (1,509); Grand Forks, ND
01/03/2015; 2:00 pm, MidcoSN		Montana	W 59–52	10–4 (2–0)	Betty Engelstad Sioux Center (1,509); Grand Forks, ND
01/08/2015; 8:00 pm		at Sacramento State	L 86–93	10–5 (2–1)	Colberg Court (224); Sacramento, CA
01/10/2015; 4:00 pm		at Portland State	L 70–73	10–6 (2–2)	Stott Center (208); Portland, OR
01/17/2015; 3:00 pm		at Northern Colorado	W 68–58	11–6 (3–2)	Bank of Colorado Arena (478); Greeley, CO
01/22/2015; 7:00 pm, MidcoSN		Idaho	W 68–62	12–6 (4–2)	Betty Engelstad Sioux Center (1,769); Grand Forks, ND
01/24/2015; 2:00 pm		Eastern Washington	W 96–82	13–6 (5–2)	Betty Engelstad Sioux Center (1,859); Grand Forks, ND
01/29/2015; 8:00 pm		at Weber State	W 57–54	14–6 (6–2)	Dee Events Center (656); Ogden, UT
01/31/2015; 3:00 pm		at Idaho State	L 69–75	14–7 (6–3)	Reed Gym (969); Pocatello, ID
02/05/2015; 7:00 pm		Southern Utah	W 67–52	15–7 (7–3)	Betty Engelstad Sioux Center (1,757); Grand Forks, ND
02/07/2015; 2:00 pm		Northern Arizona	W 78–62	16–7 (8–3)	Betty Engelstad Sioux Center (1,975); Grand Forks, ND
02/12/2015; 8:00 pm		at Montana	L 51–66	16–8 (8–4)	Dahlberg Arena (1,509); Missoula, MT
02/14/2015; 3:00 pm		at Montana State	L 62–80	16–9 (8–5)	Worthington Arena (960); Bozeman, MT
02/19/2015; 7:00 pm		at Portland State	W 76–45	17–9 (9–5)	Betty Engelstad Sioux Center (1,609); Grand Forks, ND
02/21/2015; 2:00 pm		Sacramento State	L 62–64	17–10 (9–6)	Betty Engelstad Sioux Center (1,767); Grand Forks, ND
02/26/2015; 7:30 pm, FCS Atlantic		at Northern Arizona	L 68–72 ^{2OT}	17–11 (9–7)	Rolle Activity Center (403); Flagstaff, AZ
02/28/2015; 8:00 pm		at Southern Utah	L 66–73	17–12 (9–8)	Centrum Arena (1,166); Cedar City, UT
03/07/2015; 2:00 pm, FSNOR		Northern Colorado	L 56–67	17–13 (9–9)	Betty Engelstad Sioux Center (1,646); Grand Forks, ND
Big Sky tournament
03/11/2014; 2:30 pm		vs. Northern Colorado; Quarterfinals	L 64–72	17–14	Dahlberg Arena (269); Missoula, MT
WBI
03/18/2015*; 8:00 pm		at New Mexico; First Round	L 51–54	17–15	Johnson Gymnasium (1,471); Albuquerque, NM
*Non-conference game. ^{#}Rankings from AP Poll. (#) Tournament seedings in parentheses. All times are in Central Time.

== See also ==
- 2014–15 University of North Dakota men's basketball team
