= Dalen Cambre =

American football player (born 2001)

No. 83 – New York Giants
- Position: Wide receiver
- Roster status: Practice squad

Personal information
- Born: April 10, 2001 (age 25); Youngsville, Louisiana, U.S.
- Listed height: 6 ft 0 in (1.83 m)
- Listed weight: 192 lb (87 kg)

Career information
- High school: St. Thomas More Catholic (Lafayette, Louisiana)
- College: Louisiana (2019–2024)
- NFL draft: 2025: undrafted

Career history
- New York Giants (2025–present)

Awards and highlights
- First-team All-American (2024)

Career NFL statistics as of 2025
- Games played: 7
- Stats at Pro Football Reference

Dalen Cambre (born April 10, 2001) is an American professional football wide receiver for the New York Giants of the National Football League (NFL). He previously played college football for the Louisiana Ragin' Cajuns.

== Early life ==
Cambre attended high school at St. Thomas More Catholic located in Lafayette, Louisiana. Coming out of high school, he committed to play college football for the Louisiana Ragin' Cajuns.

== College career ==
His most memorable moment as a Ragin' Cajun was in week seven of the 2023 season, where he blocked a punt late in the fourth quarter in a 34-30 victory over Texas State. During his collegiate career from 2020 through 2024, Cambre appeared in 63 games, where he hauled in ten receptions for 123 yards, and tallied 17 tackles, two blocked punts, a fumble recovery, and a touchdown, as he was known as a special team's ace.

== Professional career ==
Pre-draft measurables
Height	Weight	Arm length	Hand span	Wingspan	40-yard dash	10-yard split	20-yard split	20-yard shuttle	Three-cone drill	Vertical jump	Broad jump	Bench press
5 ft 11 1/4 in (1.81 m)	189 lb (86 kg)	28 3/4 in (0.73 m)	9 1/4 in (0.23 m)	5 ft 10 3/4 in (1.80 m)	4.43 s	1.53 s	2.52 s	4.13 s	6.88 s	36.0 in (0.91 m)	10 ft 3 in (3.12 m)	15 reps
All values from Pro Day

After not being selected in the 2025 NFL draft, Cambre signed with the New York Giants as an undrafted free agent. He entered the 2025 season, fighting for a 53-man roster spot, as a special teams ace and a standout in training camp. Cambre was waived on August 26 as part of final roster cuts and re-signed to the practice squad on September 15. He was promoted to the active roster on December 13.

On August 30, 2026, Cambre was waived by the Giants; he was re-signed to the team's practice squad the following day. On September 12, Cambre was signed to the active roster off the practice squad, following the release of Darius Slayton. On September 14, he was waived by the Giants. Two days later, New York re–signed Cambre to their practice squad.
