= 2014–15 South Alabama Jaguars women's basketball team =

Intercollegiate basketball season

2014–15 South Alabama Jaguars women's basketball
- Conference: Sun Belt Conference
- Record: 5–24 (2–18 Sun Belt)
- Head coach: Terry Fowler (2nd season)
- Assistant coaches: Yolisha Jackson; Dan Presel; Mallory Luckett
- Home arena: Mitchell Center

2014–15 Sun Belt Conference women's basketball standings
	Conf.				Overall
Team	W		L	PCT	W		L	PCT
Arkansas–Little Rock †	18	–	2	.900	25	–	4	.862
Arkansas State	16	–	4	.800	21	–	9	.700
Troy	15	–	5	.750	20	–	9	.690
UT Arlington	11	–	9	.550	17	–	12	.586
Texas State	11	–	9	.550	16	–	13	.552
Louisiana–Lafayette	10	–	10	.500	18	–	11	.621
Appalachian State	9	–	11	.450	14	–	15	.483
Georgia State	8	–	12	.400	13	–	16	.448
Louisiana–Monroe	8	–	12	.400	12	–	17	.414
Georgia Southern	2	–	18	.100	5	–	24	.172
South Alabama	2	–	18	.100	5	–	24	.172
† 2015 Sun Belt tournament winner

The 2014–15 South Alabama Jaguars women's basketball team represented the University of South Alabama during the 2014–15 NCAA Division I women's basketball season. The Jaguars, led by second year head coach Terry Fowler, played their home games at the Mitchell Center as members of the Sun Belt Conference. They finished the season 2–18, 5–24 in Sun Belt play to finish in a tie for last place.

== Roster ==
2014–15 South Alabama Jaguars women's basketball team
Players
Coaches

Pos.	#	Name	Height	Year	Previous school	Hometown
G	2	Brittany Webb	5 ft 2 in (1.57 m)	Jr	Heritage Christian	Whiteland, IN
G	3	Colby Davis	5 ft 9 in (1.75 m)	So	Wylie HS	Wylie, TX
F	4	Simonne Potts	6 ft 0 in (1.83 m)	Jr	Bellarmine Preparatory; St. Petersburg CC	Springfield, VA
G	5	Rachel Cumbo	5 ft 9 in (1.75 m)	Jr	Westside HS	Houston, TX
G	10	Marquita Daniels	5 ft 7 in (1.7 m)	Fr	Southwest Atlanta Christian Academy	Atlanta, GA
G	11	Breanna Hall	5 ft 8 in (1.73 m)	Sr	John Horn HS	Mesquite, TX
F	15	LaNeetra Guillory	6 ft 1 in (1.85 m)	Fr	Pearland HS	Pearland, TX
G	21	Juliann Miller	5 ft 8 in (1.73 m)	RS Jr	Mercy Academy; Evansville	Louisville, KY
F	22	Taylor Jenkins	6 ft 0 in (1.83 m)	Jr	Bullis School	Germantown, MD
G	23	Amber Yelding	5 ft 6 in (1.68 m)	Jr	Daphne HS; Shelton State CC	Daphne, AL
G/F	24	Grace Farnsworth	5 ft 10 in (1.78 m)	RS So	Milton HS; Weber State	Milton, GA
G	30	Genesis Perrymond	5 ft 8 in (1.73 m)	Fr	Parkview HS	Lilburn, GA
C	34	Chyna Ellis	6 ft 2 in (1.88 m)	Fr	Arlington HS	Cordova, TN
F	35	Emorie Cote	6 ft 1 in (1.85 m)	Fr	Silverton HS	Silverton, OR

Head coach

- Terry Fowler (Lane College)

Assistant coach(es)

- Yolisha Jackson (Jacksonville)
- Dan Presel (Spring Hill)
- Mallory Luckett (Murray State)

Legend

- (C) Team captain
- (S) Suspended
- (I) Ineligible
- (W) Walk-on
- Injured
- Current redshirt

Roster

== Schedule ==
Date time, TV	Rank^{#}	Opponent^{#}	Result	Record	Site (attendance) city, state
Exhibition
11/07/2014*; 7:05 pm		William Carey	W 58–26		Mitchell Center (367); Mobile, AL
Non-conference regular season
11/17/2014*; 7:05 pm		Southern Miss	L 53–64	0–1	Mitchell Center (421); Mobile, AL
11/19/2014*; 7:05 pm		Mobile	W 71–67	1–1	Mitchell Center; Mobile, AL
11/23/2014*; 2:05 pm		Alabama State	W 64–61	2–1	Mitchell Center (321); Mobile, AL
11/26/2014*; 7:05 pm		Indiana State	L 53–74	2–2	Mitchell Center (239); Mobile, AL
12/02/2014*; 5:05 pm		Spring Hill	W 69–42	3–2	Mitchell Center (1,721); Mobile, AL
12/06/2014*; 1:00 pm		at Nicholls State	L 62–66	3–3	Stopher Gym (602); Thibodaux, LA
12/14/2014*; 2:00 pm		at Ole Miss	L 48–88	3–4	Tad Smith Coliseum (950); Oxford, MS
12/16/2014*; 6:00 pm		at Tennessee Tech	L 66–70	3–5	Eblen Center (789); Cookeville, TN
12/21/2014*; 1:00 pm		at UAB	L 43–73	3–6	Bartow Arena (373); Birmingham, AL
Sun Belt regular season
12/30/2014; 5:05 pm		Arkansas State	L 50–62	3–7 (0–1)	Mitchell Center (1,682); Mobile, AL
01/03/2015; 5:00 pm		at UT Arlington	L 49–59	3–8 (0–2)	College Park Center (831); Arlington, TX
01/05/2015; 5:30 pm		at Arkansas–Little Rock	L 37–71	3–9 (0–3)	Jack Stephens Center; Little Rock, AR
01/08/2015; 5:05 pm		Appalachian State	L 63–67	3–10 (0–4)	Mitchell Center (1,448); Mobile, AL
01/10/2015; 2:05 pm		Georgia Southern	L 53–67	3–11 (0–5)	Mitchell Center (1,872); Mobile, AL
01/15/2015; 5:30 pm		at Texas State	L 42–63	3–12 (0–6)	Strahan Coliseum (1,697); San Marcos, TX
01/17/2015; 5:00 pm		at Louisiana–Lafayette	L 58–65	3–13 (0–7)	Cajundome (1,452); Lafayette, LA
01/19/2015; 5:05 pm		Arkansas–Little Rock	L 34–56	3–14 (0–8)	Mitchell Center (2,046); Mobile, AL
01/22/2015; 4:00 pm		at Appalachian State	L 59–70	3–15 (0–9)	Holmes Center (326); Boone, NC
01/29/2015; 11:00 am		Louisiana–Lafayette	W 57–47	4–15 (1–9)	Mitchell Center (2,096); Mobile, AL
01/31/2015; 2:00 pm		at Louisiana–Monroe	L 53–55	4–16 (1–10)	Fant–Ewing Coliseum (1,878); Monroe, LA
02/04/2015; 5:05 pm		Texas State	L 44–46	4–17 (1–11)	Mitchell Center (1,637); Mobile, AL
02/07/2015; 2:05 pm		Georgia State	L 78–84	4–17 (1–11)	Mitchell Center (2,535); Mobile, AL
02/12/2015; 5:15 pm		at Troy	L 67–78	4–18 (1–12)	Trojan Arena (538); Troy, AL
02/14/2015; 2:05 pm		UT Arlington	L 46–63	4–19 (1–13)	Mitchell Center (1,125); Mobile, AL
02/19/2015; 4:00 pm		at Georgia State	L 54–69	4–20 (1–14)	GSU Sports Arena (482); Atlanta, GA
02/21/2015; 3:30 pm		at Georgia Southern	W 80–63	5–20 (2–14)	Hanner Fieldhouse (2,128); Statesboro, GA
02/26/2015; 5:05 pm		Louisiana–Monroe	L 38–45	5–21 (2–15)	Mitchell Center (1,834); Mobile, AL
03/05/2015; 5:05 pm		at Arkansas State	L 60–70	5–22 (2–16)	Convocation Center (1,386); Jonesboro, AR
03/07/2015; 2:05 pm		Troy	L 79–86	5–23 (2–17)	Mitchell Center (2,076); Mobile, AL
*Non-conference game. ^{#}Rankings from AP Poll. (#) Tournament seedings in parentheses. All times are in Central Time.

== See also ==
- 2014–15 South Alabama Jaguars men's basketball team
- South Alabama Jaguars women's basketball
