= Chanda Rigby =

American basketball coach (born 1968)

Current position
- Title: Head coach
- Team: Troy
- Conference: Sun Belt
- Record: 280–165 (.629)

Biographical details
- Born: April 16, 1968 (age 58); Franklinton, Louisiana, U.S.
- Education: Southeastern Louisiana University

Coaching career (HC unless noted)
- 1992–1996: Northwest Rankin HS
- 1996–2000: Loranger HS
- 2000–2001: Tabor College
- 2001–2005: Holmes Community College
- 2005–2012: Pensacola State
- 2012–present: Troy

Head coaching record
- Overall: 433–229 (.654)

Accomplishments and honors

Championships
- Panhandle regular season (2011, 2012); Sun Belt regular season (2020, 2022); Sun Belt tournament (2016, 2017, 2021); Sun Belt East Division (2021)

Awards
- FCSAA Hall of Fame; Pensacola State Athletics Hall of Fame (2026); Mississippi All-Star Coach (2005); FCSAA Coach of the Year (2011); Panhandle Coach of the Year (2011); Sun Belt Coach of the Year (2021); Bubba Scott Lifetime Achievement Award (2022)

Chanda Rigby (born April 16, 1968) is an American basketball coach. Since 2012, she has been the head coach of the Troy Trojans women's basketball team.

== Head coaching record ==
=== NJCAA ===
Record table
Season	Team	Overall	Conference	Standing	Postseason
Tabor College Bluejays (Kansas Collegiate Athletic Conference) (2000–2001)
2000–01	Tabor College				
Holmes Community College Bulldogs (MACJC) (2001–2005)
2001–02	Holmes CC	10–11–2	0–0		
2002–03	Holmes CC	13–13	7–5		
2003–04	Holmes CC	14–11	6–6	2nd	
2004–05	Holmes CC	19–7	9–3	2nd	NJCAA First Round
Holmes:		56–42 (.571)	0–0 (–)		
Pensacola State Pirates (Panhandle Conference) (2005–2012)
2005–06	Pensacola State	9–13	1–11	6th	
2006–07	Pensacola State	15–16	4–11	6th	
2007–08	Pensacola State	16–14	3–12	5th	
2008–09	Pensacola State	22–8	15–7	3rd	
2009–10	Pensacola State	24–6	8–4	3rd	
2010–11	Pensacola State	35–1	12–0	1st	NJCAA Final Four
2011–12	Pensacola State	32–6	12–0	1st	NJCAA Final Four
Pensacola State:		153–64 (.705)	55–45 (.550)		
Total:		0–0 (–)			
National champion Postseason invitational champion Conference regular season champion Conference regular season and conference tournament champion Division regular season champion Division regular season and conference tournament champion Conference tournament champion

=== NCAA ===
Record table
Season	Team	Overall	Conference	Standing	Postseason
Troy Trojans (Sun Belt Conference) (2012–Present)
2012–13	Troy	7–24	3–17	6th (East)	
2013–14	Troy	12–18	8–10	T–5th	
2014–15	Troy	20–11	15–5	3rd	WBI First Round
2015–16	Troy	20–13	12–8	4th	NCAA First Round
2016–17	Troy	22–11	12–6	3rd	NCAA First Round
2017–18	Troy	18–13	12–6	T-3rd	
2018–19	Troy	22–9	13–5	3rd	WNIT First Round
2019–20	Troy	25–4	16–2	1st	NCAA Cancelled
2020–21	Troy	22–6	15–2	1st (East)	NCAA First Round
2021–22	Troy	24–9	13–2	1st	WNIT First Round
2022–23	Troy	17–13	12–6	T–4th	
2023–24	Troy	22–12	15–3	2nd	WNIT Fab 4
2024–25	Troy	24–14	13–5	3rd	WNIT Runner-up
2025–26	Troy	25–8	15–3	2nd	WBIT First Round
Troy:		280–165 (.629)	174–80 (.685)		
Total:		280–165 (.629)			
National champion Postseason invitational champion Conference regular season champion Conference regular season and conference tournament champion Division regular season champion Division regular season and conference tournament champion Conference tournament champion
