= 2014–15 UT Arlington Mavericks women's basketball team =

Intercollegiate basketball season

2014–15 Texas–Arlington Mavericks women's basketball
- Conference: Sun Belt Conference
- Record: 17–13 (11–9 Sun Belt)
- Head coach: Krista Gerlich (2nd season)
- Assistant coaches: Kristin Cole; Ashley Crawford; Talby Justus
- Home arena: College Park Center

2014–15 Sun Belt Conference women's basketball standings
	Conf.				Overall
Team	W		L	PCT	W		L	PCT
Arkansas–Little Rock †	18	–	2	.900	25	–	4	.862
Arkansas State	16	–	4	.800	21	–	9	.700
Troy	15	–	5	.750	20	–	9	.690
UT Arlington	11	–	9	.550	17	–	12	.586
Texas State	11	–	9	.550	16	–	13	.552
Louisiana–Lafayette	10	–	10	.500	18	–	11	.621
Appalachian State	9	–	11	.450	14	–	15	.483
Georgia State	8	–	12	.400	13	–	16	.448
Louisiana–Monroe	8	–	12	.400	12	–	17	.414
Georgia Southern	2	–	18	.100	5	–	24	.172
South Alabama	2	–	18	.100	5	–	24	.172
† 2015 Sun Belt tournament winner

The 2014–15 Texas–Arlington Mavericks women's basketball team represented the University of Texas at Arlington during the 2014–15 NCAA Division I women's basketball season. The Mavericks, led by second year head coach Krista Gerlich, played their home games at the College Park Center and were second year members of the Sun Belt Conference.

The Mavericks were the fifth seed in the 2015 Sun Belt Conference tournament where they lost to the Texas State Bobcats 46–52. The team's overall record was 17–13 with a conference record of 11–9. With the 17 win overall record, the Mavericks recorded a 13 win increase over the previous season, the largest season-on-season increase in program history.

== Roster ==
2014–15 UT Arlington Mavericks women's basketball team
Players
Coaches

Pos.	#	Name	Height	Year	Previous school	Hometown
G	0	Cierra Johnson	5 ft 9 in (1.75 m)	Fr	L D Bell	Bedford, TX
G	1	Jamika Hughes	5 ft 10 in (1.78 m)	Fr	Kennedale/Texas Tech	Fort Worth, TX
G	3	Keyra Johnson	5 ft 6 in (1.68 m)	RS So	Mansfield/Tarleton University	Mansfield, TX
F	10	Krioni Bruce	5 ft 9 in (1.75 m)	Sr	Mesquite	Mesquite, TX
G	12	Chaun Williams	5 ft 8 in (1.73 m)	Sr	Lufkin	Lufkin, TX
PG	13	LaShanda Green	5 ft 7 in (1.7 m)	Jr	McAlester/Murray State College	McAlester, OK
G	15	Brittany Treas	5 ft 10 in (1.78 m)	Jr	Murray State College	Tishomingo, OK
G	20	Maggie Lockwood	5 ft 7 in (1.7 m)	Fr	L D Bell	Bedford, TX
F	22	Toma Zaleckaite	5 ft 7 in (1.7 m)	Jr	Weatherford	Palanga, Lithuania
F	23	Morgan Hunt	6 ft 1 in (1.85 m)	RS Jr	Colleyville Heritage/Colorado State	Colleyville, TX
G	24	Amara Wainwright	5 ft 7 in (1.7 m)	RS Jr	Vista Del Lago/Eastern Arizona College	Sacramento, CA
F	25	Allyson Te'o	6 ft 1 in (1.85 m)	So	Fossil Ridge	Fort Worth, TX
F	32	Artavia Ford	5 ft 11 in (1.8 m)	Fr	Colleyville Heritage	Grapevine, TX
F	34	Morgan Holly	6 ft 0 in (1.83 m)	Jr	Naaman Forest/Odessa College	Garland, TX
F	44	Rebekah Van Dijk	6 ft 5 in (1.96 m)	Fr	Nazareth	Nazareth, TX

Head coach

Krista Gerlich

Assistant coach(es)

Kristin Cole
Ashley Crawford
Talby Justus

Legend

- (C) Team captain
- (S) Suspended
- (I) Ineligible
- (W) Walk-on
- Injured
- Current redshirt

Roster
Last update: 2015-02-03

== Schedule ==
Date time, TV	Rank^{#}	Opponent^{#}	Result	Record	Site (attendance) city, state
Out of Conference Games
11/14/2014*; 5:00 pm		Missouri Valley College	W 90–32	1–0	College Park Center (965); Arlington, TX
11/16/2014*; 3:00 pm		Houston Baptist	W 83–73	2–0	College Park Center (1,263); Arlington, TX
11/22/2014*; 2:05 pm		at Wichita State	L 61–71	2–1	Charles Koch Arena (1,549); Wichita, KS
11/26/2014*; 7:00 pm		Northern Arizona	W 80–62	3–1	College Park Center (951); Arlington, TX
12/02/2014*; 7:00 pm		UTSA	L 55–63	3–2	College Park Center (913); Arlington, TX
12/04/2014*; 7:00 pm		at Kansas State	L 41–45	3–3	Bramlage Coliseum (3,542); Manhattan, KS
12/13/2014*; 5:00 pm		at Texas A&M–Corpus Christi	W 42–28	4–3	Dugan Wellness Center (284); Corpus Christi, TX
12/17/2014*; 7:00 pm		McMurry University	W 82–25	5–3	College Park Center (626); Arlington, TX
12/21/2014*; 3:30 pm		at North Texas	W 46–38	6–3	UNT Coliseum (335); Denton, TX
Sun Belt Conference Games
12/30/2014; 5:00 pm		Georgia Southern	W 64–52	7–3 (1–0)	College Park Center (1,400); Arlington, TX
01/03/2015; 5:00 pm		South Alabama	W 59–49	8–3 (2–0)	College Park Center (831); Arlington, TX
01/05/2015; 5:15 pm		at Troy	L 63–70	8–4 (2–1)	Trojan Arena (559); Troy, AL
01/08/2015; 5:00 pm		Louisiana–Monroe	L 51–63	8–5 (2–2)	College Park Center (651); Arlington, TX
01/10/2015; 5:00 pm		Arkansas State	L 77–80	8–6 (2–3)	College Park Center (1,172); Arlington, TX
01/15/2015; 4:00 pm		at Georgia State	W 45–39	9–6 (3–3)	GSU Sports Arena (488); Atlanta, GA
01/19/2015; 5:00 pm		Texas State	L 53–60	9–7 (3–4)	College Park Center (995); Arlington, TX
01/22/2015; 5:15 pm		at Louisiana–Monroe	L 51–56	9–8 (3–5)	Fant–Ewing Coliseum (N/A); Monroe, LA
01/24/2015; 3:00 pm		at Arkansas–Little Rock	L 38–66	9–9 (3–6)	Jack Stephens Center (N/A); Little Rock, AR
01/29/2015; 3:00 pm		Georgia State	W 57–45	10–9 (4–6)	College Park Center (1,305); Arlington, TX
01/31/2015; 5:00 pm		Troy	W 70–67	11–9 (5–6)	College Park Center (1,552); Arlington, TX
02/07/2015; 3:00 pm		at Louisiana–Lafayette	W 57–51	12–9 (6–6)	CajunDome (322); Lafayette, LA
02/12/2015; 5:30 pm		at Texas State	L 58–65 ^{OT}	12–10 (6–7)	Strahan Coliseum (N/A); San Marcos, TX
02/14/2015; 2:05 pm		at South Alabama	W 63–46	13–10 (7–7)	Mitchell Center (1,125); Mobile, AL
02/19/2015; 5:00 pm		Appalachian State	W 55–45	14–10 (8–7)	College Park Center (968); Arlington, TX
02/21/2015; 5:00 pm		Louisiana–Lafayette	W 56–42	15–10 (9–7)	College Park Center (757); Arlington, TX
02/26/2015; 5:05 pm		at Arkansas State	L 62–67	15–11 (9–8)	Convocation Center (2,214); Jonesboro, AR
02/28/2015; 5:00 pm		Arkansas–Little Rock	L 38–48	15–12 (9–9)	College Park Center (887); Arlington, TX
03/05/2015; 4:00 pm		at Georgia Southern	W 66–41	16–12 (10–9)	Hanner Fieldhouse (N/A); Statesboro, GA
03/07/2015; 1:00 pm		Appalachian State	W 61–53	17–12 (11–9)	George M. Holmes Convocation Center (477); Boone, NC
Sun Belt Women's Tournament
03/11/2015; 2:00 pm	(5)	vs. (4) Texas State; Quarterfinals	L 46–52	17–13	Lakefront Arena (N/A); New Orleans, LA
*Non-conference game. ^{#}Rankings from AP Poll. (#) Tournament seedings in parentheses. All times are in Central Time.

== See also ==
2014–15 Texas–Arlington Mavericks men's basketball team
