= Hope Christian School =

High School in New Mexico

Coordinates: 35°10′20″N 106°34′12″W

- 8005 Louisiana Blvd. NE; Albuquerque, NM 87109; United States

Information
- Type: Private, Grades Pre-K-12
- Motto: Home of the Huskies
- Established: 1976
- Staff: 160
- Enrollment: 1,338
- Information: (505) 821-2513
- Colors: Green and Gold
- Website: www.hopechristianschool.org

Hope Christian School is a private, co-educational, non-denominational Christian school in Albuquerque, New Mexico, USA. It has a 40+ year history and is the largest private school in New Mexico. Hope educates approximately 1300 students per year from Pre-K through 12th grade. Hope is known for its accelerated curricula, championship athletics, award-winning arts and biblical worldview approach to everything curricular and extracurricular.

== History ==
Hope was founded in 1976 by Wayne Ehlert to provide a non-denominational Christian education to students in Albuquerque. Beginning as a high school, Hope expanded to include middle school grades in 1981 and grades 1–5 in 1982, eventually adding kindergarten and preschool as well. As enrollment increased over time, the single campus was no longer sufficient for the school's needs. In the late 1990s the school purchased a nearby church and its adjacent land. This land, located just northwest of the original campus, was developed into an elementary school campus that opened to students in fall 1997. In early 2002, the school purchased a plot of land just north of the main high school campus, which now houses the middle-school campus.

== Campuses ==
Hope currently houses three campuses along Palomas Avenue in northeast Albuquerque, parallel to Paseo Del Norte between San Pedro and Louisiana. The Elementary Campus houses grades K-5, as well as Hope Preschool (Preschool and Pre-K, ages 3–4). The Middle School Campus on the corner of Paseo and Louisiana houses grades 6–8. The High School houses grades 9-12.

== Academics ==
Hope Christian has maintained a 98% college-bound graduation rate. Hope offers Honors and Advanced Placement (AP) courses, as well as dual-credit courses. In 2017, the graduating class was offered $9.5 million in college scholarships.

Students are trained in a variety of fields. Hope relies on a combination of curricula in the lower grades, as well as a variety of both secular and religious textbooks in the upper grades. The elementary combination curriculum includes the A Beka, Bob Jones, and ACSI curricula. All education is taught from a Biblical worldview but a non-denominational perspective. The approach to science, like all other subjects, is Bible-based.

== Controversy ==
In 2012 Hope Christian School denied acceptance to a 3-year-old wishing to attend the school because the child had gay parents. The school issued an explanation which stated that "same gender couples are inconsistent with scriptural lifestyle and biblical teachings".
