= 2015 Big Sky Conference women's basketball tournament =

- Classification: Division I
- Season: 2014–15
- Teams: 8
- Site: Dahlberg Arena; Missoula, MT
- Television: Watch Big Sky

2014–15 Big Sky women's basketball standings
	Conf.				Overall
Team	W		L	PCT	W		L	PCT
Montana†	14	–	4	.778	24	–	9	.727
Sacramento State	13	–	5	.722	18	–	16	.529
Eastern Washington	12	–	6	.667	21	–	12	.636
Northern Colorado	12	–	6	.667	22	–	13	.629
North Dakota	9	–	9	.500	17	–	15	.531
Montana State	9	–	9	.500	15	–	15	.500
Northern Arizona	9	–	9	.500	13	–	17	.433
Idaho	8	–	10	.444	14	–	15	.483
Idaho State	8	–	10	.444	13	–	17	.433
Southern Utah	6	–	12	.333	13	–	15	.464
Weber State	6	–	12	.333	11	–	18	.379
Portland State	2	–	16	.111	4	–	25	.138
† 2015 Big Sky tournament winner As of March 26, 2015; Rankings from AP poll

The 2015 Big Sky Conference women's basketball tournament was held March 11–14, 2015. The champion of the tournament received an automatic bid to the 2015 NCAA tournament.

== Format ==
Unlike most Division I conference tournaments in basketball, the Big Sky tournament did not involve all of the conference's teams. With the addition of Idaho to the conference for the 2014–15 season, expanding the number of teams from 11 to 12, the tournament expanded from seven teams to eight. As in previous years, qualifying is based on overall conference record. The number of teams that failed to qualify stayed at four. All tournament games were played at the site of the regular-season champion. The women's tournament ran this year with a Wednesday-Friday-Saturday format because Montana hosted both tournaments, having won the women's regular-season title outright and earned men's hosting rights by winning a tiebreaker with regular-season co-champion Eastern Washington. With the move to an 8-seed schedule, the Big Sky also chose to go with the regular 8-seed tournament most other conferences use.

The 2015 tournament was the last to be held at campus sites, and the last in which certain teams were excluded for poor performance. Starting with the 2015–16 season, the Big Sky men's and women's tournaments both expanded to include all conference members (barring NCAA sanctions or self-imposed postseason bans), and both tournaments were held at a predetermined neutral site. For 2016, both tournaments were held at the Reno Events Center in Reno, Nevada.

== Bracket ==
Quarterfinals; Wednesday, March 11; Watch Big Sky
1	Montana	69
8	Idaho State	67
4	Eastern Washington	73
5	Northern Arizona	47
2	Sacramento State	78
7	Montana State	62
3	Northern Colorado	72
6	North Dakota	64

Semifinals; Friday, March 13; Watch Big Sky
1	Montana	55
4	Eastern Washington	51
2	Sacramento State	79
3	Northern Colorado	81^{OT}

Championship; Saturday, March 14; Watch Big Sky
1	Montana	60
3	Northern Colorado	49

All times listed are Mountain

== Game summaries ==
=== Sacramento State vs. Montana State ===
Broadcasters: Jay Sanderson & Krista Redpath Pyron

Watch Big Sky

Mar 11
11 a.m. MDT

Montana State Bobcats 62, Sacramento State Hornets 78
Scoring by half: 36-42, 26-36
Pts: Jasmine Hommes 22; Rebs: Jackie Elliott 14; Asts: Ausha Cole 6	Pts: Gretchen Harrington 19; Rebs: Kyhonta Doughty 9 Asts: Fantasia Hilliard 7

Dahlberg Arena
Missoula, MT
Attendance: 308
Referees: Karen Lasuik, Mark Munoz, Cheryl Flores

=== Northern Colorado vs. North Dakota ===
Broadcasters: Jay Sanderson & Krista Redpath Pyron

Watch Big Sky

Mar 11
1:30 p.m. MDT

North Dakota 64, Northern Colorado Bears 72
Scoring by half: 33-37, 31-35
Pts: Mia Loyd 14; Rebs: Leah Szabala 10; Asts: Makailah Dyer & Kelsey Knox 5	Pts: Stephanie Lee 24; Rebs: D'Shara Strange 9 Asts: Lindsay Mallon 8

Dahlberg Arena
Missoula, MT
Attendance: 269
Referees: Bob Scofield, Tyler Trimble, Janetta Graham

=== Eastern Washington vs. Northern Arizona ===
Broadcasters: Jay Sanderson & Krista Redpath Pyron

Watch Big Sky

Mar 11
5:30 p.m. MDT

Northern Arizona Lumberjacks 57, Eastern Washington Eagles 73
Scoring by half: 20-42, 37-31
Pts: Brittani Lusain 16; Rebs: Raven Anderson 12; Asts: Brittani Lusain 3	Pts: Hayley Hodgins 22; Rebs: Jade Redmon 10; Asts: Jade Redmon 6

Dahlberg Arena
Missoula, MT
Attendance: 638
Referees: Shelley Rusi, Tiffany Bird, Kimberly Hobbs

=== Montana vs. Idaho State ===
Broadcasters: Jay Sanderson & Krista Redpath Pyron

Watch Big Sky

Mar 11
8 p.m. MDT

Idaho State Bengals 67, Montana Lady Griz 69
Scoring by half: 26-39, 41-30
Pts: Apiphany Woods 32; Rebs: Anna Policicchio 9 Asts: Jasmine Lemon 4	Pts: Kellie Rubel & Maggie Rickman 16; Rebs: Kellie Rubel 12; Asts: Kellie Rubel & Carly Selvig 4

Dahlberg Arena
Missoula, MT
Attendance: 2,914
Referees: Kyle Bacon, Jeneane Pence, Lorena Ahumada

=== Sacramento State vs. Northern Colorado ===
Broadcasters: Jay Sanderson & Krista Redpath Pyron

Watch Big Sky

Mar 13
11 a.m. MDT

Northern Colorado Bears 81, Sacramento State Hornets 79 (OT)
Scoring by half: 34-31, 38-41 Overtime: 9-7
Pts: D'Shara Strange 23; Rebs: D'Shara Strange 13; Asts: Savannah Scott 5	Pts: Adella Randle-El 24; Rebs: Gretchen Harrigan & Kyhonta Doughty 8 Asts: Fantasia Hilliard

Dahlberg Arena
Missoula, MT
Attendance:
Referees: Bob Scofield, Tiffany Bird, Kyle Bacon

=== Eastern Washington vs. Montana ===
Broadcasters: Jay Sanderson & Krista Redpath Pyron

Watch Big Sky

Mar 13
1:30 p.m. MDT

Eastern Washington Eagles 51, Montana Lady Griz 55
Scoring by half: 18-29, 33-26
Pts: Lexie Nelson 14; Rebs: Melissa Williams 7 Asts: Delaney Hodgins & Jade Redmon 2	Pts: McCalle Williams, Kellie Rubel, & Kayleigh Valley 12; Rebs: Carly Selvig 8 Asts: Kellie Rubel 5

Dahlberg Arena
Missoula, MT
Attendance:
Referees: Penny Davis, Michol Murray, Shelley Rusi

=== Championship: Northern Colorado vs. Montana ===
Broadcasters: Jay Sanderson & Krista Redpath Pyron

Watch Big Sky

Mar 14
2 p.m. MDT

Northern Colorado Bears 49, Montana Lady Griz 60
Scoring by half: 29–20, 16–44
Pts: 23 - Strange; Rebs: 7 - Strange; Asts: 4 - Strange	Pts: 20 - Rickman; Rebs: 11 - Rubel; Asts: 4 - Feller

Dahlberg Arena
Missoula, MT
Attendance:
