= 2015 Sun Belt Conference women's basketball tournament =

- Classification: Division I
- Season: 2014–15
- Teams: 8
- Site: Lakefront Arena; New Orleans, LA
- Champions: Arkansas–Little Rock (3rd title)
- Winning coach: Joe Foley (3rd title)
- MVP: Taylor Gault (Arkansas–Little Rock)
- Television: ESPN3

2014–15 Sun Belt Conference women's basketball standings
	Conf.				Overall
Team	W		L	PCT	W		L	PCT
Arkansas–Little Rock †	18	–	2	.900	25	–	4	.862
Arkansas State	16	–	4	.800	21	–	9	.700
Troy	15	–	5	.750	20	–	9	.690
UT Arlington	11	–	9	.550	17	–	12	.586
Texas State	11	–	9	.550	16	–	13	.552
Louisiana–Lafayette	10	–	10	.500	18	–	11	.621
Appalachian State	9	–	11	.450	14	–	15	.483
Georgia State	8	–	12	.400	13	–	16	.448
Louisiana–Monroe	8	–	12	.400	12	–	17	.414
Georgia Southern	2	–	18	.100	5	–	24	.172
South Alabama	2	–	18	.100	5	–	24	.172
† 2015 Sun Belt tournament winner

The 2015 Sun Belt Conference women's basketball tournament was the postseason women's basketball tournament for the Sun Belt Conference, beginning on March 11, 2015 and ending on March 14, 2015, at the Lakefront Arena in New Orleans.

The tournament was won by the Little Rock Trojans, who received an automatic bid to the 2015 NCAA Division I women's basketball tournament.

== Seeds ==
Of the 11 eligible teams in the conference, only 8 qualified for the tournament.

2015 Sun Belt women's basketball tournament seeds and results
Seed	School	Conf.	Over.	Tiebreaker
1	‡Arkansas–Little Rock	18–2	25–4	
2	Arkansas State	16–4	21–9	
3	Troy	15–5	20–9	
4	Texas State	11–9	16–13	2–0 vs. UT Arlington
5	UT Arlington	11–9	17–12	0–2 vs. Texas State
6	Louisiana–Lafayette	10–10	18–11	
7	Appalachian State	9–11	14–15	
8	Georgia State	8–12	13–16	2–0 vs. Louisiana–Monroe
‡ – Sun Belt Conference regular season champions.

== Schedule ==
Game	Time*	Matchup^{#}	Score	Television
Quarterfinals – Wednesday, March 11
1	11:30 am	#1 UALR vs. #8 Georgia State	71–54	ESPN3
2	2:00 pm	#4 Texas State vs. #5 UT Arlington	52–46	ESPN3
3	5:00 pm	#2 Arkansas State vs. #7 Appalachian State	67–52	ESPN3
4	7:30 pm	#3 Troy vs. #6 Louisiana–Lafayette	52–66	ESPN3
Semifinals – Friday, March 13
5	11:30 am	#1 UALR vs. #4 Texas State	87–44	ESPN3
6	2:00 pm	#2 Arkansas State vs. #6 Louisiana–Lafayette	63–61	ESPN3
Championship Game – Saturday, March 14
7	7:00 pm	#1 UALR vs. #2 Arkansas State	78–72	ESPN3
*Game Times in CT. # – Rankings denote tournament seed

== Bracket ==
Quarterfinals; Wednesday, March 11
1	UALR	71
8	Georgia State	54
4	Texas State	52
5	UT Arlington	46
2	Arkansas State	67
7	Appalachian State	52
3	Troy	52
6	Louisiana–Lafayette	66

Semifinals; Friday, March 13
1	UALR	87
4	Texas State	44
2	Arkansas State	63
6	Louisiana–Lafayette	61

Championship; Saturday, March 14
1	UALR	78
2	Arkansas State	72

All times listed are Central

== See also ==
2015 Sun Belt Conference men's basketball tournament
