= 2015 Women's Basketball Invitational =

American women's college basketball tournament

- Season: 2014–15
- Teams: 16
- Champions: Louisiana–Lafayette

The 2015 Women's Basketball Invitational (WBI) was a single-elimination tournament of 16 National Collegiate Athletic Association (NCAA) Division I teams that did not participate in the 2015 NCAA Women's Division I Basketball Tournament or 2015 Women's National Invitation Tournament. The field of 16 was announced on March 16, 2015. All games were hosted by the higher seed throughout the tournament, unless the higher seed's arena was unavailable. The championship game was hosted by the school with the higher RPI. The tournament was won by the Louisiana–Lafayette Ragin' Cajuns.

== Bracket ==
Top seed of match-up will get home site, not including Furman vs. McNeese State.

=== West Region ===
1st Round; March 18–19
1	New Mexico	54
8	North Dakota	51
4	Texas State	54
5	Oral Roberts	57
2	Louisiana–Lafayette	78
7	Texas–Pan American	56
3	Furman	70
6	McNeese State	86

Quarterfinals; March 21–23
1	New Mexico	61
5	Oral Roberts	63
2	Louisiana-Lafayette	63
6	McNeese State	58

Semi-finals; March 25–26
5	Oral Roberts	64
2	Louisiana-Lafayette	65

=== East Region ===
1st Round; March 18–19
1	Northern Kentucky	79
8	Marshall	81
4	Mercer	83
5	Troy	68
2	Xavier	57
7	William & Mary	56
3	Siena	53
6	Stony Brook	46

Quarterfinals; March 22
8	Marshall	71
4	Mercer	73
2	Xavier	49
3	Siena	69

Semi-finals; March 25–26
4	Mercer	54
3	Siena	65

=== WBI Championship Game ===
Championship Game; March 29
3	Siena	50
2	Louisiana-Lafayette	52

== See also ==
- 2015 NCAA Women's Division I Basketball Tournament
- 2015 Women's National Invitation Tournament
- Women's Basketball Invitational
