= St. Thomas More Catholic High School (Louisiana) =

Location
- 450 East Farrel Road; Lafayette, Louisiana 70508; United States; 30°08′44″N 92°02′27″W

Information
- Type: Private
- Religious affiliation: Roman Catholic
- Established: 1982
- Oversight: Roman Catholic Diocese of Lafayette
- Principal: Marty Cannon
- Teaching staff: 91.5 (on a FTE basis)
- Grades: 9 - 12
- Enrollment: 1,050 (2015-2016)
- Student to teacher ratio: 11.5
- Campus type: Suburban
- Colors: Navy, Maroon, and Grey
- Mascot: Cougar
- Nickname: Cougs
- Yearbook: Cougar
- Website: www.stmcougars.net

St. Thomas More Catholic High School (STM) is a co-educational, Roman Catholic high school located in Lafayette, Louisiana. It opened its doors in 1982 and is named after the 16th-century saint Thomas More. It is owned and operated by the Roman Catholic Diocese of Lafayette.

== Demographics ==
The demographic breakdown of the 982 students enrolled in 2022–2023 was:

- Native American/Alaskan – 0.4%
- Asian/Pacific islanders – 2.1%
- Black – 2.4%
- Hispanic – 2.3%
- White – 92.2%

== Athletics ==
St. Thomas More Catholic athletics competes in the LHSAA.

The school offers sports including football, cross country, swimming, basketball, baseball, softball, volleyball, tennis, wrestling, lacrosse, golf, dancing, bowling, and soccer. The STM mascot is the cougar.

=== Championships ===
Baseball

- (4) State Championships: 1983, 1992, 2014, 2015

Basketball - Boys

- (6) State Championships: 1986, 2013, 2018, 2019, 2020, 2021

Basketball - Girls

- (2) State Championships: 2011, 2012

Cross Country - Girls

- (6) State Championships: 1982, 1993, 1997, 2013, 2014, 2023

Football

- (5) State Championships: 2016, 2019, 2020, 2022, 2023

Golf

- (1) State Championship: 2022

Lacrosse

- (3) State Championships: 2008, 2010, 2011

Soccer - Boys

- (8) State Championships: 1993, 1994, 1995, 1996, 2001, 2016, 2017, 2021

Soccer - Girls

- (9) State Championships: 1999, 2000, 2006, 2008, 2018, 2019, 2020, 2021, 2022

Softball

- (7) State Championships: 2001, 2002, 2007, 2009, 2010, 2013, 2014

Tennis - Boys

- (19) State Championships: 1988, 1991, 1992, 1993, 1994, 1995, 1999, 2000, 2001, 2002, 2003, 2004, 2005, 2006, 2007, 2018, 2019, 2021, 2022

Tennis - Girls

- (15) State Championships: 1985, 1987, 1988, 1989, 1990, 1991, 1992, 1993, 1994, 1995, 1998, 2001, 2008, 2009, 2014

Volleyball

- (10) State Championships: 2010, 2012, 2013, 2014, 2015, 2016, 2021, 2022, 2023, 2024

Wrestling

• (1) State Championships: 2026

== Notable alumni ==
- Jack Bech - NFL wide receiver for the Las Vegas Raiders.
- Dalen Cambre - NFL wide receiver for the New York Giants.
- Griffin Hebert - NFL wide receiver.
- Walker Howard - college football quarterback for the Ole Miss Rebels.
- Luke Lawton - former NFL American football fullback, played college football at McNeese State.
- Mikie Mahtook - professional baseball outfielder for the Detroit Tigers Major League Baseball.
- Brandon Mouton - former college basketball player at the University of Texas at Austin and member of the US national team at the 2003 Pan American Games.
- Lyle Mouton - Major League Baseball player, most notably for the Chicago White Sox.
- Andrew Stevenson - is an American professional baseball outfielder for the Washington Nationals of Major League Baseball (MLB).
- Javon Walker - played football for the Cougars and retired NFL WR, most notably for the Green Bay Packers of the NFL.
