= Troy Trojans women's basketball =

American college basketball program

2026–27 Troy Trojans women's basketball team
- University: Troy University
- First season: 1975–76
- Athletic director: Brent Jones
- Head coach: Chanda Rigby (15th season)
- Location: Troy, Alabama
- Arena: Trojan Arena (capacity: 6,000)
- Conference: Sun Belt Conference
- Nickname: Trojans
- Colors: Cardinal, silver, and black

NCAA Division I tournament appearances
- 1997, 2016, 2017, 2020, 2021

AIAW tournament appearances
- 1977, 1978, 1979, 1981

Conference tournament champions
- AIAW; 1981 Mid-Continent; 1997 Sun Belt; 2016, 2017, 2021

Conference regular-season champions
- 1994, 1997, 2020, 2022

Conference division champions
- 2021

Uniforms
Home	Away	Alternate

The Troy Trojans women's basketball program is the intercollegiate women's basketball of Troy University. The program is classified in the NCAA's Division I and the team competes in the Sun Belt Conference.

The head coach of the Trojans is Chanda Rigby, who is in her 12th season at Troy. During her first 11 seasons as head coach at Troy, the Trojans have made three NCAA Tournament appearances, one WBI Tournament appearance, two WNIT appearances, and have won three Sun Belt Tournament titles.

The team plays home games in Trojan Arena, which was built in 2012 and replaced the old arena known as Sartain Hall.

== History ==
=== Joyce Sorrell era ===
Troy's first season was in 1975 under then head coach Joyce Sorrell. Before Sorrell started the basketball program, Troy had no women's sports. Sorrell is considered the "mother of women's athletics" at Troy University. Sorrell maintained consistent winning records for her women's basketball teams. In 1978, she helped guide Troy to an upset win over Florida State, 80–63.

The next season (1978–79), Sorrell scored an upset win over in-state opponent Auburn by a score of 76–70, and a few games later defeated Alabama, 85–80. The Lady Trojans would finish that season with a 21–9 record. For the 1979–80 season, Sorrell once again led her team to more big wins, defeating Florida State and Florida in consecutive days. The Lady Trojans fell short in the state AIAW Tournament, but finished with a 19–11 record.

Sorrell's 1980–81 team won an Alabama AIAW State Championship and posted an 18–16 overall record on the season. Sorrell coached Troy's first ever All-American in Denise Monroe during this time, from 1977 to 1981.

Joyce Sorrell led the women's basketball program through seven years (1975 until 1982) as a member of the Association for Intercollegiate Athletics for Women (AIAW) before the NCAA began sponsoring championships in women's athletics in 1982. She then helped the program transfer from NCAA Division II to Division I in 1993–94 before retiring from coaching in 1995. She also coached nine 1,000-point scorers and 17 all-conference selections while coaching the Trojans through four different conferences, plus two seasons as an NCAA Division II independent.

=== Jerry Hester era ===
Upon taking over the head coaching position on an interim basis after Joyce Sorrell retired, Jerry Hester was hired as the full-time head coach. In 1997, his second season as head coach, he guided the Lady Trojans to their first Division I conference championship, winning the Mid-Continent Conference tournament and receiving their first-ever berth to the NCAA Tournament. Troy lost that year in the First Round of the tournament to #12 Virginia, finishing with a 23–7 overall record. Hester earned the Mid-Con's Coach of the Year honor that same year.

The following season (1997–98), Hester started out the year with a 72–69 win at home against Mississippi State, but wasn't able to sustain the momentum throughout the season, finishing with just a 13–14 overall record.

After struggling to find the same success he had in his first couple of seasons as head coach, Hester resigned from his position in 2002.

=== Michael Murphy era ===
In 2002, Michael Murphy was hired as the third women's basketball head coach at Troy. Murphy had previously been an assistant for the Alabama men's and women's basketball teams between 1997 and 2002.

Murphy steadily improved the Trojans as the school transitioned from the Atlantic Sun Conference to the Sun Belt Conference beginning in the 2005–06 season. Murphy was never able to take Troy back to the success they had seen under Joyce Sorrell though, as he never garnered any championships and had only two winning seasons. In Murphy's last two seasons as head coach, Troy had accumulated a record of 7–51 in two seasons, which led Troy to fire Murphy in 2012.

Murphy finished with a 110–179 overall record.

=== Chanda Rigby era ===
Chanda Rigby was hired in 2002 after previously being the long-time head coach for Pensacola State College, where she won a state championship and took them to the NJCAA Final Four in each of her last two seasons. She led the Pirates to a combined 64–6 record over her last two seasons at the school.

Upon Rigby coming to Troy, she immediately converted Troy to a fast-pace philosophy basketball team, which is what led to her success at the NJCAA level. Troy quickly became known for its high-scoring offense and up-tempo playing style over the next couple of years.

In the 2014–15 season, in just her third season at the helm, Rigby led Troy to their first 20-win season in 18 years, finishing with a 20–11 record and a berth into the WBI Tournament. Troy would wind up losing in the First Round of the tournament to Mercer, 68–83.

For the next season, Rigby led Troy to their second-straight 20-win season, finishing the 2015–16 season with a 20–13 record and a Sun Belt Conference tournament championship. This marked the first time Troy had consecutive seasons with 20 wins or more. The Trojans would receive a berth into the NCAA tournament as a #15-seed, only to lose to #2 Oregon State, 31–73.

Rigby followed up her successes with yet another 20-win season in 2016–17, this time finishing with a 22–11 record. Troy would garner consecutive wins against Villanova and Loyola-Chicago in the San Juan Shootout during the first half of the season. Troy finished 3rd-place in the Sun Belt standings, garnering a #3-seed for the Sun Belt Tournament. After defeating Arkansas State, UT-Arlington, and Louisiana in consecutive games, Troy won their second-straight Sun Belt Conference tournament championship. Troy received their second berth in as many years to the NCAA tournament, losing in the First Round #2 Mississippi State.

Troy would make their way back into the postseason once again during the 2018–19 season, making their first-ever appearance in the WNIT. Troy finished the season with a 22–9 overall record, which included a 71–54 win over Ole Miss during the season.

In Rigby's best season at Troy to date, the 2019–20 Trojans cruised through Sun Belt play with a 16–2 conference record and was crowned regular season Sun Belt Champions, earning the #1-seed in the Sun Belt Conference Tournament. On March 12, 2020, the Sun Belt Conference cancelled their conference tournament due to the COVID-19 pandemic, leading to Troy being awarded the automatic bid to the NCAA Tournament due to them being the regular season champion. Shortly thereafter on the same day, the NCAA cancelled the NCAA Tournament, and all other conferences cancelled their tournaments as well. The Trojans ultimately finished the season with a 25–4 overall record, the best in school history.

Following the historic 2019–20 season, Troy was able to once again capture the Sun Belt title during the 2020–21 season, this time by winning the Sun Belt Conference tournament. Troy would defeat Louisiana in the finals of the tournament by a score of 73–65. After receiving the #15 seed to the NCAA Tournament, the team would face the #2-seed Texas A&M in the first round, losing in the last seconds on what was a controversial missed call by the officials. The final score would be 84–80, in favor of the Aggies.

In Troy's 2021–22 season, the Trojans scored an upset over Mississippi State by a score of 73–66.

== Coaches ==
Years	Coach	Record
1975–1995	Joyce Sorrell	274–278
1995–2002	Jerry Hester	93–103
2002–2012	Michael Murphy	110–179
2012–present	Chanda Rigby	252–156

- Records updated as of 3/28/2025.

== All-Americans ==
- Ashley Beverly-Kelley – CollegeSportsMadness.com Mid-Major All-American Third Team (2015)
- Donette McNair - National Strength and Conditioning Association (NCSA) All-American (2011)
- Denise Monroe – AIAW All-American Second Team (1981)

== Award Winners/Finalists ==
- World Exposure Assistant Coach of the Year

Neil Harrow – 2020

- Nancy Lieberman Award

Joanna Harden – 2014 (Finalist)

- NSCA All-American Athlete of the Year Award

Donette McNair – 2011

== Postseason Results ==
=== NCAA tournament results ===
Year	Seed	Round	Opponent	Results
1997	#13	First Round	#4 Virginia	L 74–96
2016	#15	First Round	#2 Oregon State	L 31–73
2017	#15	First Round	#2 Mississippi State	L 69–110
2020	Tournament Canceled			
2021	#15	First Round	#2 Texas A&M	L 80–84

=== WBIT Tournament results ===
Year	Round	Opponent	Results
2026	First Round	#2 Kansas	L 79–70

=== WNIT Tournament Results ===
Year	Round	Opponent	Results
2019	First Round	UAB	L 89–93
2022	First Round	Alabama	L 79–82
2024	Second Round; Super 16; Great 8 Fab 4	FIU; North Carolina A&T; ULM; Minnesota	W 92–62; W 89–75; W 89–75; L 69–74
2025	Second Round; Super 16; Great 8 Fab 4 Championship	Chattanooga; North Texas; North Dakota State; Illinois State; Buffalo	W 85–72; W 88–86; W 97–88; W 99–96; L 84–88

=== WBI Tournament results ===
Year	Round	Opponent	Results
2015	First Round	Mercer	L 68–83

=== AIAW Regional Tournament Results ===
Year	Round	Opponent	Results
1977	First Round; Second Round	Judson; Stillman	W 76–65; W 59–52
1978	First Round; Second Round	FIU; Tougaloo	W 64–49; L 54–85
1979	First Round	Tougaloo	L 62–65
1981	First Round	Fort Valley State	L 59–85

== Championships/Titles ==
- 1981 – Alabama AIAW State Champions
- 1994 - East Coast Conference Regular Season Champions
- 1997 – Mid-Continent Conference Regular Season Champions
- 1997 – Mid-Continent Conference Tournament Champions
- 2016 – Sun Belt Conference Tournament Champions
- 2017 – Sun Belt Conference Tournament Champions
- 2020 – Sun Belt Conference Regular Season Champions
- 2021 – Sun Belt Conference East Division Champions
- 2021 – Sun Belt Conference Tournament Champions
- 2022 – Sun Belt Conference Regular Season Champions

== Yearly Results ==
Record table
Season	Coach	Overall	Conference	Standing	Postseason
Troy State (AIAW) (1975–1982)
1975–1976	Joyce Sorrell	11–14	—	—	—
1976–1977	Joyce Sorrell	16–10	—	—	AIAW Regional
1977–1978	Joyce Sorrell	16–11	—	—	AIAW Regional
1978–1979	Joyce Sorrell	21–9	—	—	AIAW Regional
1979–1980	Joyce Sorrell	19–11	—	—	—
1980–1981	Joyce Sorrell	17–17	—	—	AIAW Regional
1981–1982	Joyce Sorrell	11–20	—	—	—
Troy State (Gulf South Conference) (1982–1991)
1982–1983	Joyce Sorrell	14–14	5–3	3rd	—
1983–1984	Joyce Sorrell	17–12	5–5	5th	—
1984–1985	Joyce Sorrell	12–15	6–4	T-2nd	—
1985–1986	Joyce Sorrell	14–13	6–8	6th	—
1986–1987	Joyce Sorrell	8–18	3–11	T-6th	—
1987–1988	Joyce Sorrell	12–14	5–9	6th	—
1988–1989	Joyce Sorrell	8–17	2–12	8th	—
1989–1990	Joyce Sorrell	9–19	2–14	9th	—
1990–1991	Joyce Sorrell	7–20	2-14	9th	—
Troy State (Division II Independent) (1991–1993)
1991–1992	Joyce Sorrell	20–6	—	—	—
1992–1993	Joyce Sorrell	19–7	—	—	—
Troy State (East Coast Conference) (1993–1994)
1993–1994	Joyce Sorrell	10–17	4–1	2nd	—
Troy State (Mid-Continent Conference) (1994–1997)
1994–1995	Joyce Sorrell	13–14	7–11	T-7th	—
Joyce Sorrell:		274–278	0–0		
1995–1996	Jerry Hester	14–14	11–7	5th	—
1996–1997	Jerry Hester	23–7	13–3	T-1st	NCAA First Round
Troy State (Atlantic Sun Conference) (1997–2005)
1997–1998	Jerry Hester	13–14	9–7	T-5th	—
1998–1999	Jerry Hester	8–19	7–9	T-5th	—
1999–2000	Jerry Hester	9–18	6–12	T-6th	—
2000–2001	Jerry Hester	15–14	9–9	T-4th	—
2001–2002	Jerry Hester	11–17	10–10	8th	—
Jerry Hester:		93–103	65–57		
2002–2003	Michael Murphy	16–12	11–5	T-3rd (South)	—
2003–2004	Michael Murphy	11–17	10–10	T-7th	—
2004–2005	Michael Murphy	14–15	12–8	T-2nd	—
Troy (Sun Belt Conference) (2005–Present)
2005–2006	Michael Murphy	9–18	3–12	10th	—
2006–2007	Michael Murphy	12–17	5–13	10th	—
2007–2008	Michael Murphy	13–18	5–13	11th	—
2008–2009	Michael Murphy	16–14	10–8	T-3rd	—
2009–2010	Michael Murphy	12–17	5–13	9th	—
2010–2011	Michael Murphy	5–25	2–14	T-11th	—
2011–2012	Michael Murphy	2–26	1–15	T-11th	—
Michael Murphy:		110–179	64–111		
2012–2013	Chanda Rigby	7–24	3–17	T-10th	—
2013–2014	Chanda Rigby	12–18	8–10	T-5th	—
2014–2015	Chanda Rigby	20–11	15–5	3rd	WBI First Round
2015–2016	Chanda Rigby	20–13	12–8	4th	NCAA First Round
2016–2017	Chanda Rigby	22–11	12–6	3rd	NCAA First Round
2017–2018	Chanda Rigby	18–13	12–6	T-3rd	—
2018–2019	Chanda Rigby	22–9	13–5	3rd	WNIT First Round
2019–2020	Chanda Rigby	25–4	16–2	1st	NCAA (Cancelled)
2020–2021	Chanda Rigby	22–6	15–2	1st (East)	NCAA First Round
2021–2022	Chanda Rigby	24–9	13–2	1st	WNIT First Round
2022–2023	Chanda Rigby	17–13	12–6	T-4th	
2023–2024	Chanda Rigby	22–12	15–3	2nd	WNIT Fab 4
2024–2025	Chanda Rigby	24–13	13–5	3rd	WNIT Runner-up
2025–2026	Chanda Rigby	25–8	15–3	2nd	WBIT First Round
Chanda Rigby:		280–165	174–80		
Total:		757–724			
National champion Postseason invitational champion Conference regular season champion Conference regular season and conference tournament champion Division regular season champion Division regular season and conference tournament champion Conference tournament champion
