= Louisiana Ragin' Cajuns women's basketball =

2025–26 Louisiana Ragin' Cajuns women's basketball team
- University: University of Louisiana at Lafayette
- Head coach: Garry Brodhead (14th season)
- Location: Lafayette, Louisiana
- Arena: Cajundome (capacity: 11,550)
- Conference: Sun Belt
- Nickname: Ragin' Cajuns
- Colors: Vermilion and white

NCAA Division I tournament appearances
- 2007

Conference regular-season champions
- 2021

Conference division champions
- 2004, 2007, 2021

Uniforms
Home	Away

The Louisiana Ragin' Cajuns women's basketball program represents intercollegiate women's basketball at the University of Louisiana at Lafayette. The Ragin' Cajuns compete in the Sun Belt Conference in Division I of the National Collegiate Athletic Association (NCAA) and play home games at the Cajundome in Lafayette, Louisiana.

== History ==
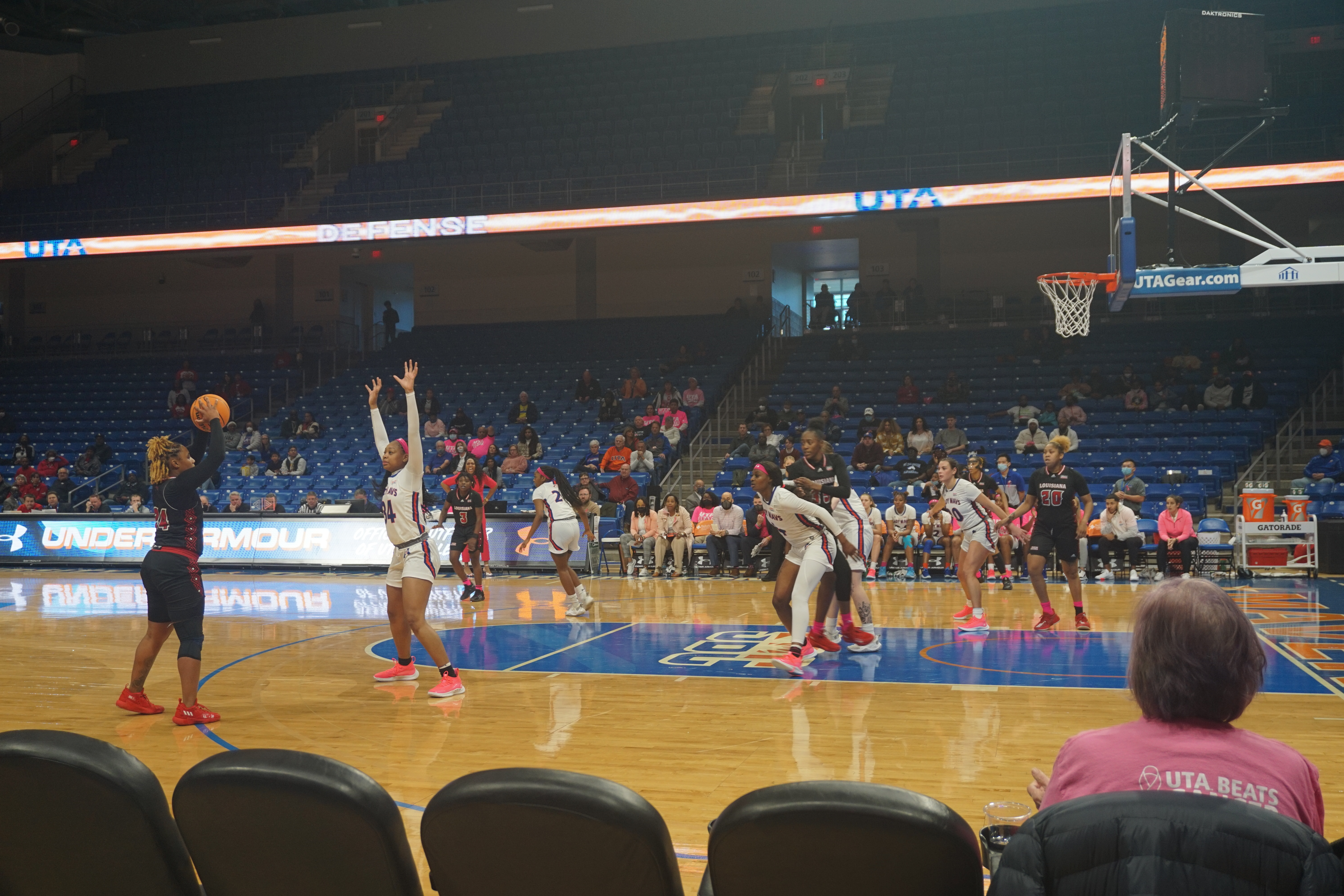
The Ragin' Cajuns in action at UT Arlington

Since beginning play in 1971, the Ragin' Cajuns have an all-time record (as of the end of the 2015–16 season) of 451–764. Louisiana–Lafayette played in the Association for Intercollegiate Athletics for Women from 1972 to 1982, the Southland Conference from 1982 to 1987, and the American South Conference from 1987 to 1991 before joining the Sun Belt in 1991. They won the West Division in 2004 and 2007, losing in the conference tournament final in the latter year, though they were still invited to the NCAA Tournament. In the First Round of the tournament that year, they lost 87–58 to Marquette in the First Round. They won the postseason WBI in 2015 and 2016. In 2021, the Cajuns, after winning the conference regular season for the first time in school history, came up just short in the conference finals to gain an invitation to the 2021 WNIT.

== NCAA tournament results ==
Year	Seed	Round	Opponent	Result
2007	#11	First Round	#6 BYU	L 34-100
