= Karl Smesko =

American basketball coach (born 1970)

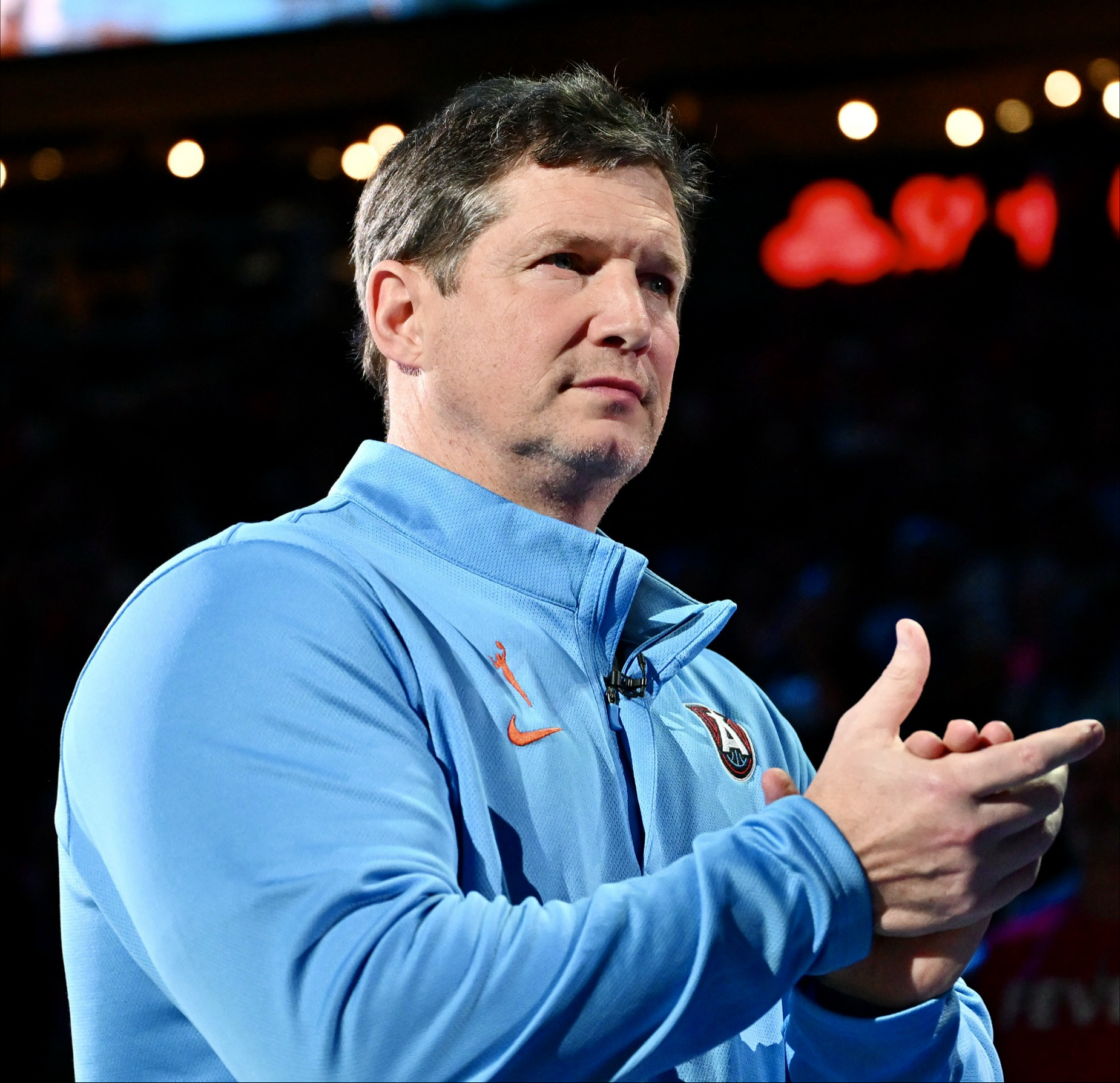
- Smesko in 2026

Atlanta Dream
- Title: Head coach
- League: WNBA

Personal information
- Born: October 2, 1970 (age 56) Bath Township, Ohio, U.S.

Career information
- College: Kent State (1992–1993)
- Position: Point guard
- Coaching career: 1997–present

Career history

Coaching
- 1997–1998: Walsh
- 1998–1999: Maryland (Asst.)
- 1999–2001: IPFW
- 2002–2024: Florida Gulf Coast
- 2025–present: Atlanta Dream

Career highlights
- NAIA DII national championship (1998); 11× ASUN Tournament (2012, 2014, 2015, 2017–2024); 14× ASUN regular season (2009, 2011–2016, 2018–24); NAIA Coach of the Year (1998); 13× Atlantic Sun Coach of the Year (2009, 2011–2016, 2018–2023); Kay Yow Award (2012)

Karl Wade Smesko (born October 2, 1970) is an American professional basketball coach who is the head coach of the Atlanta Dream of the WNBA. He previously served as the founding head coach of the Florida Gulf Coast women's basketball team from 2002 to 2024. During his tenure at Florida Gulf Coast, the team won 25 or more games for 14 consecutive seasons.

== High school ==
Born in Bath Township, Summit County, Ohio, Smesko played point guard for Revere High School. He was considered strong, but not fast. He played well enough to garner interest from a small college in Oakland, California, but he chose to attend Kent State University.

== College career ==
While at Kent State, pursuing a communications degree, Smesko attempted to walk on to the basketball team but initially was unsuccessful. He tried again as a senior, and made the team. However, he ended up leaving the team to help care for a family member. He graduated summa cum laude in 1993.

== Coaching career ==
=== Early coaching career ===
Smesko started coaching boys' basketball at his alma mater, Revere High School, while still in college. He briefly worked as an intern at a local TV station, but he preferred coaching so he decided to pursue a coaching career. He had attended basketball camps run by Bob Knight and became enamored with Knight's coaching philosophy. He continued to coach at the high school, while reaching out to secure a college position. Among the coaches he contacted was Herb Sendek, the head coach at Arizona State University. Sendek didn't have a position for him, but did have some advice, urging Smesko obtain his master's degree.

=== Walsh University (1997–1998) ===
One of the local schools, Walsh University, had a suitable program, but the position came with a requirement to assist with the women's basketball program. He had never considered coaching women's basketball but he accepted the opportunity. He assisted the head coach with weight room and workout sessions for the players, as well as tape analysis. He completed his master's in a year, and then planned to take a job as an assistant with a men's basketball team. However, Michelle Steele, the head coach of the women's team, resigned at the end of the 1996–97 season. The players approached the athletic director of Walsh, Jim Dennison, to push him to name Smesko to the head coaching position. It didn't take much pushing, as Dennison was supportive. Smesko accepted the position. The Cavaliers, who had been 105–117 under their prior coach, were not expected to be a strong team. They were picked to finish in sixth place in the nine-team Mid-Ohio Conference. Under Smesko, the team improved. In the Mid-Ohio Conference tournament, the team made it to the championship game, but lost to Shawnee State. The team assumed they needed a win to earn the automatic bid to the Division II tournament, so the players left to head home for spring break. However, the selection committee chose Walsh as the final bid to the 32-team postseason tournament. As the last team in the field, they were not expected to win a single game. Smesko's father did not consider making the drive to attend the tournament, held in Sioux City, Iowa. After winning their third game, Smesko called his father to let him know the Cavaliers were still playing. Despite a snowstorm, his father made the drive, which took ten hours, to reach the tournament. The team defeated Doane College in the semi-final, then faced Mary Hardin-Baylor in the championship game. Walsh scored a come-from-behind victory to secure the National Championship, the first time ever an unseeded team had won an NAIA National Championship. The accomplishment helped Smesko earn NAIA Coach of the Year honors.

=== Maryland (1998–1999) ===
Smesko accepted an assistant coaching position at Maryland in 1998. He served as an assistant under Chris Weller. He remained in that position for one season.

=== IPFW (1999–2001) ===
After that season, Smesko was hired by IPFW (Note: In 2018, the Indiana University and Purdue University systems dissolved IPFW, with each system creating a new Fort Wayne campus. The IPFW athletic program was transferred to the larger of the two successor institutions, Purdue University Fort Wayne, and now competes as Purdue Fort Wayne.) as the head coach of the women's basketball program. The Mastodons had gone 6–20 in 1997–98, and dropped to 2–24 in 1998–99. Under Smesko, the team improved to 13–14 in 1999–2000, and improved again in the following year to produce a 19–8 record.

=== Florida Gulf Coast University (2002–2024) ===
Prior to the 2002-2003 basketball season, Florida Gulf Coast University (FGCU) approached him about becoming the head of the women's basketball program. He'd be the school's inaugural women's basketball head coach, with the team having plans to from their current NAIA status to the NCAA Division II level. Smesko and the team spent the next year working out of the school's trailer to build a program from scratch. He persuaded players to come to the school, even though the first workout would take place on asphalt outdoor courts, while the school built an indoor facility. In his first game, his team won by 17 points. By the time the season ended, they had but a single loss for a record of 30–1. The team continued to excel, amassing a record of 132–21 as a Division II team. In 2007, FGCU applied to become a Division I school, as part of the Atlantic Sun Conference, now known as the ASUN Conference. The Eagles have competed in that conference ever since, finishing first or second in the conference every year. In 2011, they completed the transition to full Division I status, and eligibility for postseason tournaments. Under his leadership, FGCU has made the NCAA Division I women's basketball tournament seven times, in 2012, 2014, 2015, 2017, 2018, 2019, 2021, and 2022, pulling first round upsets in 2015 and 2018.

FGCU is one of only two Division I women's basketball teams, along with UConn, to win 25 or more games each of the last 14 seasons.

=== Atlanta Dream (2025–present) ===
On November 13, 2024, Smesko was named the head coach of the WNBA’s Atlanta Dream.

== Head coaching record ==
=== College ===
Record table
Season	Team	Overall	Conference	Standing	Postseason
Walsh Cavaliers (Independent) (1997–1998)
1997–98	Walsh University	29–5			NAIA DII Champion
Walsh University:		29–5 (.853)			
IPFW Mastodons (Great Lakes Valley Conference) (1999–2001)
1999–2000	IPFW	13–14	9–11	8th	
2000–01	IPFW	19–8	12–8	5th	
IPFW:		32–22 (.593)	21–19 (.525)		
FGCU Eagles (Independent (Division II)) (2001–2007)
2002–03	FGCU	30–1			
2003–04	FGCU	18–8			
2004–05	FGCU	21–9			
2005–06	FGCU	29–2			NAIA DII Elite Eight
2006–07	FGCU	34–1			NAIA DII Runner-Up
FGCU (Independent):		132–21 (.863)			
FGCU Eagles (Atlantic Sun) (2007–2024)
2007–08	FGCU	22–9	12–3	2nd	WNIT Second Round
2008–09	FGCU	26–5	17–3	1st	WNIT Second Round
2009–10	FGCU	24–7	17–3	2nd	WNIT First Round
2010-11	FGCU	28–4	17–3	1st	WNIT Second Round
2011–12	FGCU	29–3	18–0	1st	NCAA First round
2012–13	FGCU	27–7	18–0	1st	WNIT First Round
2013–14	FGCU	26–8	17–1	1st	NCAA First round
2014–15	FGCU	31–3	14–0	1st	NCAA Second round
2015–16	FGCU	33–6	14–0	1st	WNIT Runner Up
2016–17	FGCU	26–9	12–2	2nd	NCAA First Round
2017–18	FGCU	31–5	13–1	1st	NCAA Second Round
2018–19	FGCU	28–5	16–0	1st	NCAA First Round
2019–20	FGCU	30–3	15–1	1st	Postseason not held due to COVID-19
2020–21	FGCU	26–3	16–0	1st	NCAA First Round
2021–22	FGCU	30–3	15–1	1st	NCAA Second Round
2022–23	FGCU	33–4	17–1	1st	NCAA Second Round
2023–24	FGCU	29–4	16–0	1st	NCAA First Round
2024–25	FGCU	0–2	0–0		
FGCU (ASun):		479–91 (.840)	264–19 (.933)		
FGCU (All):		611–112 (.845)	264–19 (.933)		
Total:		672–139 (.829)			
National champion Postseason invitational champion Conference regular season champion Conference regular season and conference tournament champion Division regular season champion Division regular season and conference tournament champion Conference tournament champion

=== WNBA ===
Legend
Regular season	G	Games coached	W	Games won	L	Games lost	W–L %	Win–loss %
Playoffs	PG	Playoff games	PW	Playoff wins	PL	Playoff losses	PW–L %	Playoff win–loss %

Team	Year	G	W	L	W–L%	Finish	PG	PW	PL	PW–L%	Result
ATL	2025	44	30	14	.682	1st in East	3	1	2	.333	Lost in First Round
ATL	2026	44	30	14	.682	1st in East	0	0	0	–	
Career		88	60	28	.682		2	1	2	.333	

== Personal ==
Smesko's father, Albert, coached high school boys' basketball and is a member of the Akron Coaches Association Hall of Fame. His brother, Kyle, coaches football as the offensive coordinator for Allegheny College

== Awards and honors ==
- 1998—NAIA Coach of the Year
- 1998—Mid-Ohio Conference Coach of the Year
- 2007—DII South Region Coach of the Year
- 2009—Atlantic Sun Coach of the Year
- 2011—Atlantic Sun Coach of the Year
- 2012—Atlantic Sun Coach of the Year
- 2012—Kay Yow Award
- 2012—Ohio Basketball Hall of Fame (as coach of the 1998 Walsh University National Champions)
- 2013—Atlantic Sun Coach of the Year
- 2013—Coach of the Year College Sports Madness 2013 All-Mid Major Teams
- 2014—Atlantic Sun Coach of the Year
- 2015—Atlantic Sun Coach of the Year
- 2016—Atlantic Sun Coach of the Year
- 2016—espnW Mid-Major Coach of the Year
- 2018—Atlantic Sun Coach of the Year
- 2019—Atlantic Sun Coach of the Year

== See also ==
- List of college women's basketball career coaching wins leaders
