= 2014 Atlantic Sun women's basketball tournament =

- Classification: Division I
- Season: 2013–14
- Teams: 8
- Champions: Florida Gulf Coast
- Atlantic Sun women's basketball tournaments

2013–14 Atlantic Sun women's basketball standings
	Conf.				Overall
Team	W		L	PCT	W		L	PCT
FGCU†	17	–	1	.944	26	–	8	.765
Stetson	16	–	2	.889	27	–	8	.771
Northern Kentucky*	13	–	5	.722	18	–	13	.581
USC Upstate	11	–	7	.611	17	–	15	.531
Jacksonville	10	–	8	.556	13	–	17	.433
Mercer	9	–	9	.500	17	–	14	.548
East Tennessee State	5	–	13	.278	9	–	21	.300
Kennesaw State	4	–	14	.222	6	–	24	.200
Lipscomb	3	–	15	.167	6	–	24	.200
North Florida	2	–	16	.111	6	–	23	.207
† 2014 Atlantic Sun Tournament *ineligible for postseason play due to Div. I transition winner As of March 16, 2014; Rankings from AP Poll

The 2014 Atlantic Sun women's basketball tournament was the 36th edition of the Atlantic Sun Conference Championship. It took place from March 11, 2014 through March 16, 2014 in several arenas. All games took place at the higher of the two teams competing.

== Format ==
The A-Sun Championship was a six-day single-elimination tournament. The top eight teams (with the exception of Northern Kentucky) competed in the championship. As part of their transition to Division I from Division II, Northern Kentucky was not eligible for post season play until 2017, including the A-Sun tournament. The winner of the tournament earned the A-Sun's automatic bid into the 2014 NCAA tournament.

== Bracket ==
Quarterfinals; March 11; ESPN3 / ASun.tv
1	Florida Gulf Coast	92
8	Lipscomb	53
4	Jacksonville	36
5	Mercer	59
2	Stetson	73
7	Kennesaw State	56
3	USC Upstate	76
6	East Tennessee State	66

Semifinals; March 15; ESPN3
1	Florida Gulf Coast	64
5	Mercer	47
2	Stetson	90
3	USC Upstate	60

Championship; March 16; CSS
1	Florida Gulf Coast	72
2	Stetson	70
