= 2016–17 Stetson Hatters women's basketball team =

Intercollegiate basketball season

2016–17 Stetson Hatters women's basketball
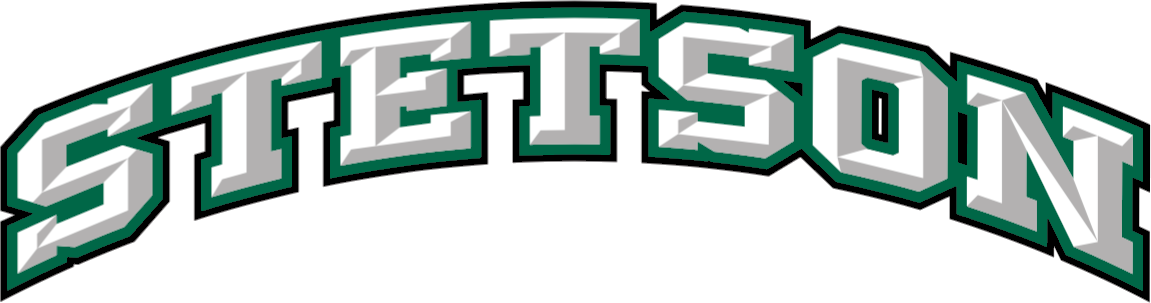

FIU Thanksgiving Tournament Champions Atlantic Sun regular season champions

WNIT, First Round
- Conference: Atlantic Sun Conference
- Record: 26–7 (13–1 A-Sun)
- Head coach: Lynn Bria (9th season)
- Assistant coaches: Daniel Barber; Otavio Battaglia; Brittany Young
- Home arena: Edmunds Center

2016–17 ASUN women's basketball standings
	Conf.				Overall
Team	W		L	PCT	W		L	PCT
Stetson	13	–	1	.929	26	–	7	.788
Florida Gulf Coast †	12	–	2	.857	26	–	9	.743
Jacksonville	11	–	3	.786	23	–	9	.719
Kennesaw State	8	–	6	.571	10	–	20	.333
NJIT	4	–	10	.286	11	–	19	.367
North Florida	3	–	11	.214	10	–	20	.333
Lipscomb	3	–	11	.214	6	–	24	.200
USC Upstate	2	–	12	.143	9	–	21	.300
† 2017 ASUN Tournament winner As of March 18, 2017; Rankings from AP poll

The 2015–16 Stetson Hatters women's basketball team represented Stetson University in the 2016–17 NCAA Division I women's basketball season. The Hatters, led by ninth year head coach Lynn Bria, played their home games at Edmunds Center and were members of the Atlantic Sun Conference. They finished the season 26–7, 13–1 in A-Sun play to win the Atlantic Sun regular season title. They advanced to the championship game of the 2017 Atlantic Sun women's basketball tournament, where they lost to Florida Gulf Coast. They received an automatic bid to the WNIT, where they lost to UCF in the first round.

== Media ==
All home games and conference road will be shown on ESPN3 or A-Sun.TV. Non conference road games will typically be available on the opponents website. Audio broadcasts of Hatters games can be found on WSBB AM 1230/1490 with Ryan Rouse on the call.

== Roster ==
2016–17 Stetson Hatters women's basketball team
Players
Coaches

Pos.	#	Name	Height	Year	Previous school	Hometown
G	0	Adriana Ellis	5 ft 9 in (1.75 m)	Fr	Winter Springs HS	Orlando, FL
F	1	Sarah Sagerer	6 ft 3 in (1.91 m)	Jr	The Rock School	Vöcklabruck, Austria
G	2	McKenna Beach	5 ft 6 in (1.68 m)	So	Cape Coral HS	Cape Coral, FL
G	4	Johanna McMillan	5 ft 7 in (1.7 m)	RS Jr	Sanford School; UNC Wilmington	Mullica Hill, NJ
G	10	Brianti Saunders	5 ft 4 in (1.63 m)	Sr	Hilliard Middle-Senior	Hilliard, FL
F	11	Paloma Gragera	6 ft 2 in (1.88 m)	Fr	Montverde Academy	Tres Cantos, Spain
C	12	Re'Nique Francis	6 ft 3 in (1.91 m)	So	Charlotte Amalie HS	St. Thomas, VI
G	15	DeAsia Beals	5 ft 9 in (1.75 m)	Sr	Holy Cross	Covington, KY
G	21	Myka Johnson-Matthews	5 ft 8 in (1.73 m)	So	Bishop McNamara HS	Upper Marlboro, MD
G	22	Ida Andersson	5 ft 8 in (1.73 m)	So	Taljegymnasiet	Södertälje, Sweden
F	23	Breana Bey	5 ft 9 in (1.75 m)	Sr	Lincoln HS; Monroe College	Jersey City, NJ
F	24	Kennedi Colclough	6 ft 0 in (1.83 m)	Fr	Arundel HS	Gambrills, MD
G	25	Aisha Turner	5 ft 7 in (1.7 m)	RS Sr	Westlake HS; Clemson	College Park, GA
G	30	Brittney Chambers	5 ft 6 in (1.68 m)	Jr	Apopka HS; Daytona State	Orlando, FL
F	54	Jordan Tully (I) (redshirt)	6 ft 2 in (1.88 m)	So	Oak Park HS; Boise State	Winnipeg, MB

Head coach

- Lynn Bria (Charleston (WV))

Assistant coach(es)

- Daniel Barber (Florida)
- Otavio Battaglia (São Paulo)
- Brittany Young (Francis Marion)

Legend

- (C) Team captain
- (S) Suspended
- (I) Ineligible
- (W) Walk-on
- Injured
- Current redshirt

Roster

== Schedule ==
Date time, TV	Rank^{#}	Opponent^{#}	Result	Record	Site (attendance) city, state
Non-conference regular season
11/11/2016*; 5:00 pm, ESPN3		Webber International	W 92–54	1–0	Edmunds Center (355); DeLand, FL
11/12/2016*; 7:00 pm, ESPN3		Valparaiso	W 87–75	2–0	Edmunds Center (338); DeLand, FL
11/16/2016*; 7:00 pm, ESPN3		Bethune-Cookman	W 63–60	3–0	Edmunds Center (560); DeLand, FL
11/19/2016*; 5:00 pm, ESPN3		Eastern Illinois	W 72–55	4–0	Edmunds Center (498); DeLand, FL
11/21/2016*; 8:00 pm		at Arkansas	L 62–79	4–1	Bud Walton Arena (1,179); Fayetteville, AR
11/25/2016*; 2:00 pm		vs. Robert Morris; FIU Thanksgiving Tournament semifinals	W 68–60	5–1	FIU Arena (331); Miami, FL
11/27/2016*; 12:00 pm		vs. Weber State; FIU Thanksgiving Tournament championship	W 70–68 ^{OT}	6–1	FIU Arena; Miami, FL
11/30/2016*; 11:30 am, ESPN3		Northern Kentucky	W 54–45	7–1	Edmunds Center (5,332); DeLand, FL
12/03/2016*; 2:00 pm		at High Point	W 81–47	8–1	Millis Center (502); High Point, NC
12/06/2016*; 6:30 pm		at Chattanooga	L 55–66	8–2	McKenzie Arena (1,514); Chattanooga, TN
12/08/2016*; 11:00 am, ESPN3		Warner	W 100–34	9–2	Edmunds Center (1,601); DeLand, FL
12/10/2016*; 1:00 pm, ESPN3		Palm Beach Atlantic	W 89–50	10–2	Edmunds Center (471); DeLand, FL
12/19/2016*; 1:00 pm, ESPN3		SIU Edwardsville; Hatter Classic	W 78–68	11–2	Edmunds Center (483); DeLand, FL
12/20/2016*; 1:00 pm, ESPN3		Tennessee State; Hatter Classic	L 50–56	11–3	Edmunds Center (462); DeLand, FL
12/30/2016*; 7:00 pm		at No. 23 South Florida	L 60–74	11–4	USF Sun Dome (1,956); Tampa, FL
Atlantic Sun regular season
01/07/2017; 1:00 pm, ESPN3		Florida Gulf Coast	L 71–84	11–5 (0–1)	Edmunds Center (1,063); DeLand, FL
01/14/2017; 2:00 pm, ESPN3		at Kennesaw State	W 65–56	12–5 (1–1)	KSU Convocation Center (435); Kennesaw, GA
01/16/2017; 7:30 pm, ESPN3		at Lipscomb	W 91–66	13–5 (2–1)	Allen Arena (550); Nashville, TN
01/21/2017; 1:00 pm, ESPN3		USC Upstate	W 80–68	14–5 (3–1)	Edmunds Center (588); DeLand, FL
01/23/2017; 7:00 pm, ESPN3		NJIT	W 77–43	15–5 (4–1)	Edmunds Center (498); DeLand, FL
01/28/2017; 1:00 pm, ESPN3		North Florida	W 68–44	16–5 (5–1)	Edmunds Center (349); DeLand, FL
02/02/2017; 7:00 pm, ESPN3		at Jacksonville	W 65–49	17–5 (6–1)	Swisher Gymnasium (632); Jacksonville, FL
02/04/2017; 1:00 pm, ESPN3		at North Florida	W 62–44	18–5 (7–1)	UNF Arena (356); Jacksonville, FL
02/08/2017; 7:00 pm, ESPN3		Jacksonville	W 57–47 ^{OT}	19–5 (8–1)	Edmunds Center (611); DeLand, FL
02/11/2017; 7:00 pm, ESPN3		Lipscomb	W 66–60	20–5 (9–1)	Edmunds Center (492); DeLand, FL
02/13/2017; 7:00 pm, ESPN3		Kennesaw State	W 60–43	21–5 (10–1)	Edmunds Center (463); DeLand, FL
02/18/2017; 1:00 pm, ESPN3		at NJIT	W 60–37	22–5 (11–1)	Fleisher Center (388); Newark, NJ
02/20/2017; 7:00 pm, ESPN3		at USC Upstate	W 77–55	23–5 (12–1)	G. B. Hodge Center (328); Spartanburg, SC
02/25/2017; 7:00 pm, ESPN3		at Florida Gulf Coast	W 67–64	24–5 (14–1)	Alico Arena (3,384); Fort Myers, FL
Atlantic Sun Tournament
03/03/2017; 7:00 pm, ESPN3	(1)	(8) USC Upstate; Quarterfinals	W 70–49	25–5	Edmunds Center (640); DeLand, FL
03/08/2017; 7:00 pm, ESPN3	(1)	(4) Kennsaw State; Semifinals	W 78–48	26–5	Edmunds Center (688); DeLand, FL
03/12/2017; 3:00 pm, ESPN3	(1)	(2) Florida Gulf Coast; Championship Game	L 70–77	26–6	Edmunds Center (2,088); DeLand, FL
WNIT
03/16/2017*; 7:00 pm		at UCF; First Round	L 53–73	26–7	CFE Arena (676); Orlando, FL
*Non-conference game. ^{#}Rankings from AP Poll. (#) Tournament seedings in parentheses. All times are in Eastern Time.

== Rankings ==
Ranking movement Legend: ██ Increase in ranking. ██ Decrease in ranking. NR = Not ranked. RV = Received votes.
Poll	Pre- Season	Week 2	Week 3	Week 4	Week 5	Week 6	Week 7	Week 8	Week 9	Week 10	Week 11	Week 12	Week 13	Week 14	Week 15	Week 16	Week 17	Week 18	Week 19	Final
AP	NR	NR	NR	NR	NR	NR	NR	NR	NR	NR	NR	NR	NR	NR	NR	NR	NR	NR	NR	N/A
Coaches	NR	NR	NR	NR	NR	NR	NR	NR	NR	NR	NR	NR	NR	NR	NR	NR	RV	NR	NR	

== See also ==
- 2016–17 Stetson Hatters men's basketball team
