= 2016–17 Florida Gulf Coast Eagles women's basketball team =

Intercollegiate basketball season

2016–17 Florida Gulf Coast Eagles women's basketball
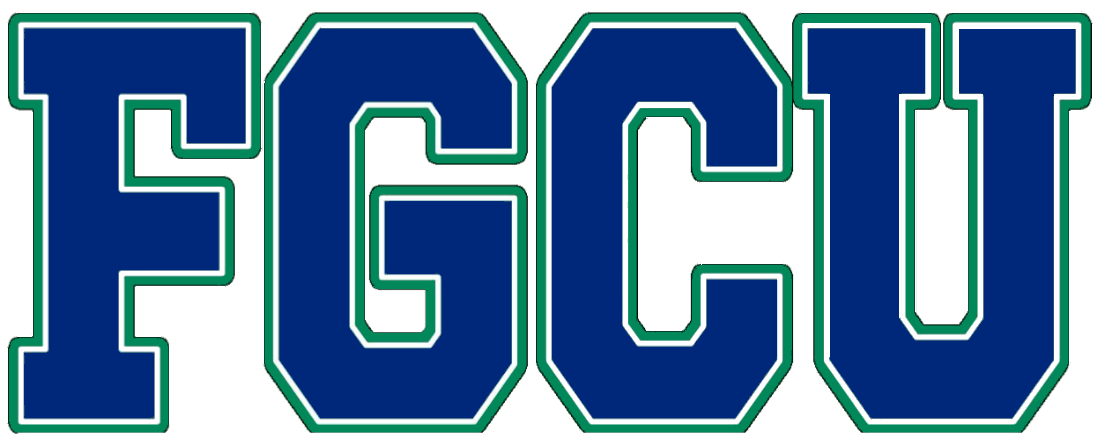

Atlantic Sun Tournament Champions

NCAA Women's Tournament, first round
- Conference: Atlantic Sun Conference
- Record: 26–9 (12–2 A-Sun)
- Head coach: Karl Smesko (15th season)
- Assistant coaches: Chelsea Banbury; Chelsea Lyles; Jenna Cobb
- Home arena: Alico Arena

2016–17 ASUN women's basketball standings
	Conf.				Overall
Team	W		L	PCT	W		L	PCT
Stetson	13	–	1	.929	26	–	7	.788
Florida Gulf Coast †	12	–	2	.857	26	–	9	.743
Jacksonville	11	–	3	.786	23	–	9	.719
Kennesaw State	8	–	6	.571	10	–	20	.333
NJIT	4	–	10	.286	11	–	19	.367
North Florida	3	–	11	.214	10	–	20	.333
Lipscomb	3	–	11	.214	6	–	24	.200
USC Upstate	2	–	12	.143	9	–	21	.300
† 2017 ASUN Tournament winner As of March 18, 2017; Rankings from AP poll

The 2016–17 Florida Gulf Coast Eagles women's basketball team represented Florida Gulf Coast University (FGCU) in the 2016–17 NCAA Division I women's basketball season. The Eagles, led by 15th year head coach Karl Smesko, played their home games at Alico Arena and were members of the Atlantic Sun Conference. They finished the season 26–9, 12–2 in A-Sun play to finish in second place. They defeated North Florida, Jacksonville and Stetson to become champions of the ASUN Tournament and received an automatic bid to the NCAA women's tournament, where they lost to Miami (FL) in the first round.

== Media ==
All home games and conference road will be shown on ESPN3 or A-Sun.TV. Road games will also be broadcast on the FGCU Portal.

== Roster ==
2016–17 Florida Gulf Coast Eagles women's basketball team
Players
Coaches

Pos.	#	Name	Height	Year	Previous school	Hometown
G	1	Jessica Cattani (W)	5 ft 7 in (1.7 m)	RS Jr	Muskego HS	Muskego, WI
G	4	Chandler Ryan	5 ft 7 in (1.7 m)	Fr	Morton HS	Groveland, IL
G	10	Tayler Goodall	5 ft 9 in (1.75 m)	RS So	Columbus North HS	Columbus, IN
G	11	Erica Nelson	5 ft 8 in (1.73 m)	RS Jr	Lee Summit North HS; Johnson County CC	Columbus, IN
F	12	Samantha Kisiel	5 ft 11 in (1.8 m)	Fr	Evergreen	Evergreen, CO
G	13	Jordin Alexander	5 ft 11 in (1.8 m)	RS Sr	Southeastern HS; Brown	Fishers, IN
F	20	Haley Laughter	5 ft 11 in (1.8 m)	RS So	Carolina Day School	Asheville, NC
G	21	Mcla McGhee	5 ft 11 in (1.8 m)	RS Sr	Pattonville; George Mason	Bridgeton, MO
G	22	China Dow	5 ft 8 in (1.73 m)	RS Sr	Christian Academy of Louisville; Middle Tennessee	Louisville, KY
G	23	Morgan Meacham	5 ft 11 in (1.8 m)	Fr	Heritage Hall HS	Oklahoma City, OK
G	24	Taylor Gradinjan	5 ft 9 in (1.75 m)	RS Jr	Cudahy HS	Cudahy, WI
G	25	Sydnei McCaskill	5 ft 6 in (1.68 m)	RS Jr	Dr. Phillips HS; Georgia	Orlando, FL
F	31	Nasrin Ulel	5 ft 9 in (1.75 m)	Fr	Murrieta Valley HS	Murrieta, CA
F	32	Rosemarie Julien	5 ft 11 in (1.8 m)	Jr	Treasure Coast HS; Chipola College	Port St. Lucie, FL
G	42	Tytionia Adderly	5 ft 10 in (1.78 m)	Fr	Cardinal Newman	Jupiter, FL

Head coach

- Karl Smesko (Kent State)

Assistant coach(es)

- Chelsea Banbury (Florida Gulf Coast)
- Chelsea Lyles (Florida Gulf Coast)
- Jenna Cobb (Florida Gulf Coast)

Legend

- (C) Team captain
- (S) Suspended
- (I) Ineligible
- (W) Walk-on
- Injured
- Current redshirt

Roster

== Schedule ==
Date time, TV	Rank^{#}	Opponent^{#}	Result	Record	Site (attendance) city, state
Non-conference regular season
11/11/2016*; 2:00 pm		at Quinnipiac	L 56–66	0–1	TD Bank Sports Center (505); Hamden, CT
11/13/2016*; 2:00 pm		at Hartford	W 70–63	1–1	Chase Arena at Reich Family Pavilion (505); Hartford, CT
11/15/2016*; 7:00 pm, ESPN3		FIU	W 89–42	2–1	Alico Arena (1,679); Fort Myers, FL
11/18/2016*; 2:00 pm		at Northern Colorado	L 74–77 ^{2OT}	2–2	Bank of Colorado Arena (2,550); Greeley, CO
11/25/2016*; 5:00 pm		vs. No. 7 Ohio State; Gulf Coast Showcase quarterfinals	L 66–79	2–3	Germain Arena; Estero, FL
11/26/2016*; 1:30 pm		vs. George Washington; Gulf Coast Showcase consolation 2nd round	L 49–76	2–4	Germain Arena; Estero, FL
11/27/2016*; 11:00 am		vs. Kent State; Gulf Coast Showcase 7th place game	L 64–77	2–5	Germain Arena; Estero, FL
12/04/2016*; 1:00 pm, ESPN3		Ave Maria; Gulf Coast Showcase Opening Round	W 101–34	3–5	Alico Arena (1,117); Fort Myers, FL
12/09/2016*; 5:15 pm, ESPN3		Siena	W 66–42	4–5	Alico Arena (2,034); Fort Myers, FL
12/11/2016*; 2:00 pm		at FIU	W 65–50	5–5	FIU Arena (380); Boca Raton, FL
12/14/2016*; 7:00 pm, ESPN3		North Carolina A&T	W 67–41	6–5	Alico Arena (1,084); Fort Myers, FL
12/17/2016*; 3:00 pm		at Illinois	L 73–82	6–6	State Farm Center (1,051); Champaign, IL
12/20/2016*; 7:00 pm, ESPN3		Chattanooga	W 68–55	7–6	Alico Arena (1,014); Fort Myers, FL
12/21/2016*; 7:00 pm, ESPN3		St. Thomas (FL)	W 71–48	8–6	Alico Arena (1,014); Fort Myers, FL
12/29/2016*; 7:00 pm, ESPN3		Hampton; Hilton Garden Inn FCGU Classic	W 60–49	9–6	Alico Arena (1,117); Fort Myers, FL
12/30/2016*; 7:00 pm, ESPN3		UC Riverside; Hilton Garden Inn FCGU Classic	W 60–45	10–6	Alico Arena (1,036); Fort Myers, FL
01/02/2017*; 7:00 pm, ESPN3		Savannah State	W 89–40	11–6	Alico Arena (1,115); Fort Myers, FL
Atlantic Sun regular season
01/07/2017; 1:00 pm, ESPN3		at Stetson	W 84–71	12–6 (1–0)	Edmunds Center (1,063); DeLand, FL
01/14/2017; 1:30 pm, ESPN3		at Lipscomb	W 90–63	13–6 (2–0)	Allen Arena (205); Nashville, TN
01/16/2017; 12:00 pm, ESPN3		at Kennesaw State	W 75–56	14–6 (3–0)	KSU Convocation Center (1,123); Kennesaw, GA
01/21/2017; 4:00 pm, ESPN3		NJIT	W 73–53	15–6 (4–0)	Alico Arena (1,459); Fort Myers, FL
01/23/2017; 7:00 pm, ESPN3		USC Upstate	W 93–43	16–6 (5–0)	Alico Arena (1,821); Fort Myers, FL
01/28/2017; 4:00 pm, ESPN3		Jacksonville	W 60–57	17–6 (6–0)	Alico Arena (2,122); Fort Myers, FL
02/02/2017; 7:00 pm, ESPN3		at North Florida	W 68–51	18–6 (7–0)	UNF Arena (403); Jacksonville, FL
02/04/2017; 1:00 pm, ESPN3		at Jacksonville	L 65–73	18–7 (7–1)	Swisher Gymnasium (700); Jacksonville, FL
02/08/2017; 7:00 pm, ESPN3		North Florida	W 69–46	19–7 (8–1)	Alico Arena (1,907); Fort Myers, FL
02/11/2017; 4:00 pm, ESPN3		Kennesaw State	W 69–35	20–7 (9–1)	Alico Arena (1,904); Fort Myers, FL
02/13/2017; 7:00 pm, ESPN3		Lipscomb	W 98–50	21–7 (10–1)	Alico Arena (1,648); Fort Myers, FL
02/18/2017; 7:00 pm, ESPN3		at USC Upstate	W 80–50	22–7 (11–1)	G. B. Hodge Center (418); Spartanburg, SC
02/20/2017; 7:00 pm, ESPN3		at NJIT	W 77–46	23–7 (12–1)	Fleisher Center (200); Newark, NJ
02/25/2017; 7:00 pm, ESPN3		Stetson	L 64–67	23–8 (12–2)	Alico Arena (3,384); Fort Myers, FL
Atlantic Sun Women's Tournament
03/03/2017; 7:00 pm, ESPN3	(2)	(7) North Florida; Quarterfinals	W 59–42	24–8	Alico Arena (1,039); Fort Myers, FL
03/08/2017; 7:00 pm, ESPN3	(2)	(3) Jacksonville; Semifinals	W 68–64	25–8	Alico Arena (1,203); Fort Myers, FL
03/12/2017; 3:00 pm, ESPN3	(2)	at (1) Stetson; Championship Game	W 77–70	26–8	Edmunds Center (2,088); DeLand, FL
NCAA Women's Tournament
03/18/2017*; 4:00 pm, ESPN2	(13 S)	at (4 S) No. 16 Miami (FL); First Round	L 60–62	26–9	Watsco Center (2,232); Coral Gables, FL
*Non-conference game. ^{#}Rankings from AP Poll. (#) Tournament seedings in parentheses. S=Stockton Region. All times are in Eastern Time.

== Rankings ==
Ranking movement Legend: ██ Increase in ranking. ██ Decrease in ranking. NR = Not ranked. RV = Received votes.
Poll	Pre- Season	Week 2	Week 3	Week 4	Week 5	Week 6	Week 7	Week 8	Week 9	Week 10	Week 11	Week 12	Week 13	Week 14	Week 15	Week 16	Week 17	Week 18	Week 19	Final
AP																				N/A
Coaches																				

== See also ==
- 2016–17 Florida Gulf Coast Eagles men's basketball team
