= 2017 ASUN women's basketball tournament =

- Classification: Division I
- Season: 2016–17
- Teams: 8
- Site: campus sites
- Champions: Florida Gulf Coast (4th title)
- Winning coach: Karl Smesko (4th title)
- MVP: China Dow (Florida Gulf Coast)
- Television: ESPN3

2016–17 ASUN women's basketball standings
	Conf.				Overall
Team	W		L	PCT	W		L	PCT
Stetson	13	–	1	.929	26	–	7	.788
Florida Gulf Coast †	12	–	2	.857	26	–	9	.743
Jacksonville	11	–	3	.786	23	–	9	.719
Kennesaw State	8	–	6	.571	10	–	20	.333
NJIT	4	–	10	.286	11	–	19	.367
North Florida	3	–	11	.214	10	–	20	.333
Lipscomb	3	–	11	.214	6	–	24	.200
USC Upstate	2	–	12	.143	9	–	21	.300
† 2017 ASUN Tournament winner As of March 18, 2017; Rankings from AP poll

The 2017 ASUN women's basketball tournament was the 31st edition of the ASUN Conference championship. It took place March 3, 8 and 12, 2017 in several arenas. Florida Gulf Coast won the tournament and received an automatic trip to the NCAA women's tournament.

== Format ==
The ASUN Championship is a six-day single-elimination tournament. Eight teams competed in the championship, with the higher seeded team in each matchup hosting the game.

== Seeds ==
Seed	School	Conference	Overall	Tiebreaker
1	Stetson	13–1	24–5	
2	Florida Gulf Coast	12–2	23–8	
3	Jacksonville	11–3	22–7	
4	Kennesaw State	8–6	9–19	
5	NJIT	4–10	11–18	
6	Lipscomb	3–11	6–23	2-0 vs. North Florida
7	North Florida	3–11	10–19	0-2 vs. Lipscomb
8	USC Upstate	2–12	9–20	
Overall records are as of the end of the regular season.

== Schedule ==
Game	Matchup^{#}	Time*	Television	Attendance
Quarterfinals – Friday, March 3
1	#8 USC Upstate at #1 Stetson	7 pm	WatchESPN	640
2	#5 NJIT at #4 Kennesaw State	7 pm	WatchESPN	983
3	#7 North Florida #2 at Florida Gulf Coast	7 pm	WatchESPN	1,039
4	#6 Lipscomb at #3 Jacksonville	7 pm	WatchESPN	603
Semifinals – Wednesday, March 8
5	#4 Kennesaw State at #1 Stetson	7 pm	WatchESPN	688
6	#3 Jacksonville at #2 Florida Gulf Coast	7 pm	WatchESPN	1,203
Championship – Sunday, March 12
7	#2 Florida Gulf Coast at #1 Stetson	3 pm	WatchESPN	
*Game times in ET. #-Rankings denote tournament seeding. All games hosted by higher-seeded team.

== Bracket ==
Quarterfinals; March 3 WatchESPN
1	Stetson	'70
8	USC Upstate	49
4	Kennesaw State	'62
5	NJIT	60
3	Jacksonville	91
6	Lipscomb	64
2	Florida Gulf Coast	59
7	North Florida	42

Semifinals; March 8 WatchESPN
1	Stetson	78
4	Kennesaw State	48
2	Florida Gulf Coast	68
3	Jacksonville	64

Championship; March 12; WatchESPN
1	Stetson	70
2	Florida Gulf Coast	77

== See also ==
- 2017 ASUN men's basketball tournament
