= 2016–17 Kennesaw State Owls women's basketball team =

Intercollegiate basketball season

2016–17 Kennesaw State Owls women's basketball
- Conference: Atlantic Sun Conference
- Record: 10–20 (8–6 ASUN)
- Head coach: Agnus Berenato (1st season)
- Assistant coaches: Khadija Head; Sherill Baker; Lisa Pace
- Home arena: KSU Convocation Center

2016–17 ASUN women's basketball standings
| | Conf. | | | | Overall |
| Team | W | | L | PCT | W | | L | PCT |
|---|---|---|---|---|---|---|---|---|
| Stetson | 13 | – | 1 | .929 | 26 | – | 7 | .788 |
| Florida Gulf Coast † | 12 | – | 2 | .857 | 26 | – | 9 | .743 |
| Jacksonville | 11 | – | 3 | .786 | 23 | – | 9 | .719 |
| Kennesaw State | 8 | – | 6 | .571 | 10 | – | 20 | .333 |
| NJIT | 4 | – | 10 | .286 | 11 | – | 19 | .367 |
| North Florida | 3 | – | 11 | .214 | 10 | – | 20 | .333 |
| Lipscomb | 3 | – | 11 | .214 | 6 | – | 24 | .200 |
| USC Upstate | 2 | – | 12 | .143 | 9 | – | 21 | .300 |
† 2017 ASUN Tournament winner As of March 18, 2017; Rankings from AP poll

The 2016–17 Kennesaw State Owls women's basketball team represented Kennesaw State University during the 2016–17 NCAA Division I women's basketball season. The Owls, led by first-year head coach Agnus Berenato, played their home games at the KSU Convocation Center and were members of the Atlantic Sun Conference (ASUN). They finished the season 10–20, 8–6 in ASUN play, to finish in fourth place. They advanced to the semifinals of the ASUN tournament, where they lost to Stetson.

== Roster ==
2016–17 Kennesaw State Owls women's basketball team
Players
Coaches

| Pos. | # | Name | Height | Year | Hometown |
|---|---|---|---|---|---|
| F | 4 | Kelly Dulkoski | 5 ft 8 in (1.73 m) | RS Jr | China Grove, NC |
| G | 11 | Clara Young | 5 ft 8 in (1.73 m) | RS Jr | Woodstock, GA |
| G/F | 12 | Alexandra Landby | 6 ft 2 in (1.88 m) | RS Fr | Stockholm, Sweden |
| F/C | 13 | Carlotta Gianolla | 6 ft 1 in (1.85 m) | Fr | Marcon, Italy |
| F | 22 | Allison Johnson | 6 ft 0 in (1.83 m) | So | Norcross, GA |
| G | 23 | Deja McPhee | 5 ft 9 in (1.75 m) | RS Jr | Gainesville, FL |
| G | 24 | Iceis Walker | 5 ft 7 in (1.7 m) | So | Lawrenceville, GA |
| F | 25 | Katie Polinsky | 6 ft 2 in (1.88 m) | Jr | Gainesville, FL |
| F | 30 | Aaereon Smith | 5 ft 9 in (1.75 m) | Sr | Louisville, KY |
| F | 31 | Chloe Branch | 5 ft 11 in (1.8 m) | RS Jr | Fayetteville, GA |
| G | 44 | Deandrea Sawyers | 5 ft 8 in (1.73 m) | Sr | Nashville, TN |

Head coach

- Agnus Berenato (Mount St. Mary's)

Assistant coach(es)

- Khadija Head (Murray State)
- Sherill Baker (Georgia)
- Lisa Pace (Eastern Kentucky)

Legend

- (C) Team captain
- (S) Suspended
- (I) Ineligible
- (W) Walk-on
- Injured
- Current redshirt

Roster
Last update: July 20, 2024

== Schedule ==
| Date time, TV | Rank^{#} | Opponent^{#} | Result | Record | Site (attendance) city, state |
Exhibition
| November 6, 2016*; 2:00 p.m. | | Coastal Georgia | W 92–56 | | KSU Convocation Center (361); Kennesaw, GA |
Non-conference regular season
| November 11, 2016*; 8:00 p.m. | | at Vanderbilt | L 54–86 | 0–1 | Memorial Gymnasium (2,395); Nashville, TN |
| November 14, 2016*; 4:30 p.m., ESPN3 | | Jacksonville State | L 59–65 | 0–2 | KSU Convocation Center (381); Kennesaw, GA |
| November 16, 2016*; 7:00 p.m., ESPN3 | | Georgia Tech | L 49–86 | 0–3 | KSU Convocation Center (889); Kennesaw, GA |
| November 22, 2016*; 7:00 p.m., ESPN3 | | at Georgia State | L 59–62 | 0–4 | GSU Sports Arena (465); Atlanta, GA |
| November 26, 2016*; 12:00 p.m., ESPN3 | | Savannah State | W 72–60 | 1–4 | KSU Convocation Center (461); Kennesaw, GA |
| November 29, 2016*; 12:00 p.m., ESPN3 | | at Georgia | L 40–82 | 1–5 | Stegeman Coliseum (2,056); Athens, GA |
| December 3, 2016*; 7:00 p.m., ESPN3 | | at Mercer | L 46–61 | 1–6 | Hawkins Arena (768); Macon, GA |
| December 14, 2016*; 8:00 p.m. | | at Austin Peay | L 49–68 | 1–7 | Dunn Center (1,097); Clarksville, TN |
| December 17, 2016*; 12:00 p.m., ESPN3 | | Morehead State | L 50–71 | 1–8 | KSU Convocation Center (250); Kennesaw, GA |
| December 19, 2016*; 3:00 p.m. | | vs. Arkansas State; Puerto Rico Classic | L 67–70 | 1–9 | South Point Arena; Enterprise, NV |
| December 20, 2016*; 7:30 p.m. | | vs. Portland State; Puerto Rico Classic | L 61–71 | 1–10 | South Point Arena (71); Enterprise, NV |
| December 21, 2016*; 7:45 p.m. | | vs. Xavier; Puerto Rico Classic | L 52–75 | 1–11 | South Point Arena (120); Enterprise, NV |
| January 2, 2017*; 2:00 p.m., ESPN3 | | Wofford | L 49–78 | 1–12 | KSU Convocation Center (478); Kennesaw, GA |
| January 4, 2017*; 2:00 p.m., ESPN3 | | Temple | L 38–79 | 1–13 | KSU Convocation Center (406); Kennesaw, GA |
Atlantic Sun Conference season
| January 7, 2017; 2:30 p.m., ESPN3 | | at Lipscomb | W 70–55 | 2–13 (1–0) | Allen Arena (560); Nashville, TN |
| January 14, 2017; 2:00 p.m., ESPN3 | | Stetson | L 56–65 | 2–14 (1–1) | KSU Convocation Center (435); Kennesaw, GA |
| January 16, 2017; 7:00 p.m., ESPN3 | | Florida Gulf Coast | L 56–75 | 2–15 (1–2) | KSU Convocation Center (1,123); Kennesaw, GA |
| January 21, 2017; 1:00 p.m., ESPN3 | | at Jacksonville | L 48–72 | 2–16 (1–3) | Swisher Gymnasium (578); Jacksonville, FL |
| January 23, 2017; 7:00 p.m., ESPN3 | | at North Florida | W 67–61 | 3–16 (2–3) | UNF Arena (271); Jacksonville, FL |
| January 28, 2017; 7:00 p.m., ESPN3 | | at USC Upstate | W 79–71 | 4–16 (3–3) | G. B. Hodge Center (289); Spartanburg, SC |
| February 2, 2017; 7:00 p.m., ESPN3 | | NJIT | W 75–64 | 5–16 (4–3) | KSU Convocation Center (355); Kennesaw, GA |
| February 4, 2017; 2:00 p.m., ESPN3 | | USC Upstate | W 74–67 | 6–16 (5–3) | KSU Convocation Center (723); Kennesaw, GA |
| February 8, 2017; 7:00 p.m., ESPN3 | | at NJIT | W 66–56 | 7–16 (6–3) | Fleisher Center (300); Newark, NJ |
| February 11, 2017; 2:00 p.m., ESPN3 | | at Florida Gulf Coast | L 35–69 | 7–17 (6–4) | Alico Arena (1,904); Fort Myers, FL |
| February 13, 2017; 7:00 p.m., ESPN3 | | at Stetson | L 43–60 | 7–18 (6–5) | Edmunds Center (463); DeLand, FL |
| February 18, 2017; 2:00 p.m., ESPN3 | | North Florida | W 52–48 | 8–18 (7–5) | KSU Convocation Center (425); Kennesaw, GA |
| February 20, 2017; 7:00 p.m., ESPN3 | | Jacksonville | L 62–71 | 8–19 (7–6) | KSU Convocation Center (531); Kennesaw, GA |
| February 25, 2017; 2:00 p.m., ESPN3 | | Lipscomb | W 96–69 | 9–19 (8–6) | KSU Convocation Center (471); Kennesaw, GA |
Atlantic Sun women's tournament
| March 3, 2017; 7:00 p.m., ESPN3 | (4) | (5) NJIT; Quarterfinals | W 62–60 | 10–19 | KSU Convocation Center (983); Kennesaw, GA |
| March 8, 2017; 7:00 p.m., ESPN3 | (4) | at (1) Stetson; Semifinals | L 48–78 | 10–20 | Edmunds Center (688); DeLand, FL |
*Non-conference game. ^{#}Rankings from AP poll. (#) Tournament seedings in parentheses. All times are in Eastern.

== See also ==
- 2016–17 Kennesaw State Owls men's basketball team
