= 2016–17 North Florida Ospreys women's basketball team =

Intercollegiate basketball season

2016–17 North Florida Ospreys women's basketball
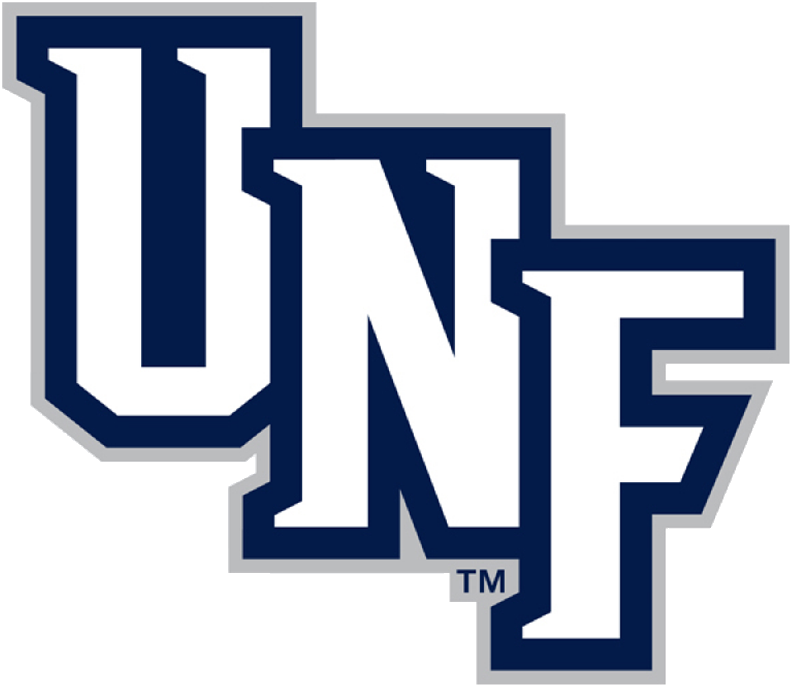
- Conference: Atlantic Sun Conference
- Record: 10–20 (3–11 A-Sun)
- Head coach: Darrick Gibbs (2nd season)
- Assistant coaches: David Lowery; Jessica Taylor; MaryLynne Schaefer
- Home arena: UNF Arena

2016–17 ASUN women's basketball standings
	Conf.				Overall
Team	W		L	PCT	W		L	PCT
Stetson	13	–	1	.929	26	–	7	.788
Florida Gulf Coast †	12	–	2	.857	26	–	9	.743
Jacksonville	11	–	3	.786	23	–	9	.719
Kennesaw State	8	–	6	.571	10	–	20	.333
NJIT	4	–	10	.286	11	–	19	.367
North Florida	3	–	11	.214	10	–	20	.333
Lipscomb	3	–	11	.214	6	–	24	.200
USC Upstate	2	–	12	.143	9	–	21	.300
† 2017 ASUN Tournament winner As of March 18, 2017; Rankings from AP poll

The 2016–17 North Florida Ospreys women's basketball team represented the University of North Florida in the 2016–17 NCAA Division I women's basketball season. The Ospreys, led by second year head coach Darrick Gibbs, played their games at UNF Arena and were members of the Atlantic Sun Conference. They finished the season 10–20, 3–11 in A-Sun play to finish in a tie for sixth place. They lost in the quarterfinals of A-Sun Tournament to Florida Gulf Coast.

== Media ==
All home games and conference road games were shown on ESPN3 or A-Sun.TV.

== Roster ==
2016–17 North Florida Ospreys women's basketball team
Players
Coaches

Pos.	#	Name	Height	Year	Previous school	Hometown
G	1	Claire Ioannidis	5 ft 7 in (1.7 m)	Sr	Shelford Girls' Grammar; Tinidad State JC	Melbourne, Australia
G	2	Sierra Shepherd	5 ft 4 in (1.63 m)	Jr	Ribault	Jacksonville, FL
G	3	Kennya Simms	5 ft 5 in (1.65 m)	Fr	Benjamin E. Mays	Atlanta, GA
G	4	Adrienne Jackson	5 ft 9 in (1.75 m)	Fr	Leesburg	Leesburg, FL
G/F	5	Hadley Kiefer	5 ft 11 in (1.8 m)	So	Jerome	Dublin, OH
G/F	10	Simone Brown	5 ft 11 in (1.8 m)	RS Jr	Father Lopez; Liberty	Land O'Lakes, FL
G/F	11	Taru Madekivi	5 ft 11 in (1.8 m)	Sr	Aurajoki	Turku, Finland
G	12	Tesh Hanson	5 ft 11 in (1.8 m)	RS Jr	Seffner Christian Academy; Liberty	Tampa, FL
F/C	15	Karrah Johnson	6 ft 2 in (1.88 m)	Sr	Lake Highland Prep; Santa Fe College	Orlando, FL
F	22	Jaiveonna Norris	6 ft 0 in (1.83 m)	Jr	Homewood-Flossmoor HS; Miami Dade College	Chicago Heights, IL
F	23	Kirsten Clement	6 ft 2 in (1.88 m)	Fr	Bartram Trail	Jacksonville, FL
G/F	24	Maiya Rumph	5 ft 10 in (1.78 m)	Jr	Sparkman	Madison, AL

Head coach

- Darrick Gibbs (Wofford)

Assistant coach(es)

- David Lowery (Mississippi State)
- Jessica Taylor (Wofford)
- MaryLynne Schaefer (Hartford)

Legend

- (C) Team captain
- (S) Suspended
- (I) Ineligible
- (W) Walk-on
- Injured
- Current redshirt

Roster

== Schedule ==
Date time, TV	Rank^{#}	Opponent^{#}	Result	Record	Site (attendance) city, state
Non-conference regular season
11/11/2016*; 3:00 pm, ESPN3		Florida A&M	W 71–60	1–0	UNF Arena (343); Jacksonville, FL
11/15/2016*; 7:00 pm		at South Florida	L 42–78	1–1	USF Sun Dome (1,906); Tampa, FL
11/18/2016*; 11:00 am, ESPN3		Webber International	W 103–57	2–1	UNF Arena (2,620); Jacksonville, FL
11/20/2016*; 1:00 pm, ESPN3		Florida Atlantic	W 95–88 ^{2OT}	3–1	UNF Arena (302); Jacksonville, FL
11/22/2016*; 7:00 pm		at Xavier	L 46–83	3–2	Cintas Center (645); Cincinnati, OH
11/25/2016*; 12:00 pm		vs. South Alabama; JU Thanksgiving Classic	L 55–62	3–3	Swisher Gymnasium (255); Jacksonville, FL
11/26/2016*; 12:00 pm		vs. Nicholls; JU Thanksgiving Classic	W 77–74	4–3	Swisher Gymnasium (103); Jacksonville, FL
11/30/2016*; 6:30 pm		at College of Charleston	W 60–47	5–3	TD Arena (520); Charleston, SC
12/04/2016*; 2:00 pm, ACCN Extra		at NC State	L 52–78	5–4	Reynolds Coliseum (1,701); Raleigh, NC
12/10/2016*; 1:00 pm, ESPN3		Edward Waters	W 70–50	6–4	UNF Arena (523); Jacksonville, FL
12/13/2016*; 7:00 pm, ESPN3		Morehead State	L 65–84	6–5	UNF Arena (203); Jacksonville, FL
12/15/2016*; 3:00 pm		at Bethune–Cookman	L 50–52	6–6	Moore Gymnasium (106); Daytona Beach, FL
12/19/2016*; 6:00 pm, ACCN Extra		at No. 7 Florida State	L 39–95	6–7	Donald L. Tucker Center (2,947); Tallahassee, FL
12/30/2016*; 3:00 pm, ESPN3		Wofford; Best Western UNF New Year Classic	L 60–79	6–8	UNF Arena (243); Jacksonville, FL
12/31/2016*; 3:00 pm, ESPN3		Warner; Best Western UNF New Year Classic	W 72–44	7–8	UNF Arena (223); Jacksonville, FL
Atlantic Sun regular season
01/07/2017; 1:00 pm, ESPN3		at Jacksonville	L 58–68	7–9 (0–1)	Swisher Gymnasium (677); Jacksonville, FL
01/14/2017; 1:00 pm, ESPN3		at NJIT	L 62–64	7–10 (0–2)	Fleisher Center (499); Newark, NJ
01/16/2017; 7:00 pm, ESPN3		at USC Upstate	W 78–67	8–10 (1–2)	G. B. Hodge Center (317); Spartanburg, SC
01/21/2017; 1:00 pm, ESPN3		Lipscomb	L 58–60	8–11 (1–3)	UNF Arena (258); Jacksonville, FL
01/23/2017; 7:00 pm, ESPN3		Kennesaw State	L 61–67	8–12 (1–4)	UNF Arena (271); Jacksonville, FL
01/28/2017; 1:00 pm, ESPN3		at Stetson	L 44–68	8–13 (1–5)	Edmunds Center (349); DeLand, FL
02/02/2017; 7:00 pm, ESPN3		Florida Gulf Coast	L 51–68	8–14 (1–6)	UNF Arena (403); Jacksonville, FL
02/04/2017; 1:00 pm, ESPN3		Stetson	L 44–62	8–15 (1–7)	UNF Arena (356); Jacksonville, FL
02/08/2017; 7:00 pm, ESPN3		at Florida Gulf Coast	L 46–69	8–16 (1–8)	Alico Arena (1,907); Fort Myers, FL
02/11/2017; 1:00 pm, ESPN3		USC Upstate; Homecoming	W 77–74 ^{3OT}	9–16 (2–8)	UNF Arena (336); Jacksonville, FL
02/13/2017; 7:00 pm, ESPN3		NJIT	W 61–51	10–16 (3–8)	UNF Arena (301); Jacksonville, FL
02/18/2017; 2:00 pm, ESPN3		at Kennesaw State	L 48–52	10–17 (3–9)	KSU Convocation Center (425); Kennesaw, GA
02/20/2017; 6:30 pm, ESPN3		at Lipscomb	L 62–66	10–18 (3–10)	Allen Arena (215); Nashville, FL
02/25/2017; 1:00 pm, ESPN3		at Jacksonville	L 59–69	10–19 (3–11)	UNF Arena (503); Jacksonville, FL
Atlantic Sun Women's Tournament
03/03/2017; 7:00 pm, ESPN3	(7)	at (2) Florida Gulf Coast; Quarterfinals	L 42–59	10–20	Alico Arena (1,039); Fort Myers, FL
*Non-conference game. ^{#}Rankings from AP Poll. (#) Tournament seedings in parentheses. All times are in Eastern Time.

== See also ==
- 2016–17 North Florida Ospreys men's basketball team
