= 2016–17 Florida State Seminoles women's basketball team =

Intercollegiate basketball season

2016–17 Florida State Seminoles women's basketball

Paradise Jam Reef Division Champions

NCAA tournament (3 Seed), Elite Eight
- Conference: Atlantic Coast Conference

Ranking
- Coaches: No. 7
- AP: No. 10
- Record: 28–7 (13–3 ACC)
- Head coach: Sue Semrau (20th season)
- Assistant coaches: Lance White; Brooke Wyckoff; Danielle Atkinson
- Home arena: Donald L. Tucker Center (Capacity: 12,100)

2016–17 ACC women's basketball standings
| | Conf. | | | | Overall |
| Team | W | | L | PCT | W | | L | PCT |
|---|---|---|---|---|---|---|---|---|
| No. 2 Notre Dame^{†} | 15 | – | 1 | .938 | 33 | – | 4 | .892 |
| No. 9 Duke | 13 | – | 3 | .813 | 28 | – | 6 | .824 |
| No. 10 Florida State | 13 | – | 3 | .813 | 28 | – | 7 | .800 |
| No. 13 Louisville | 12 | – | 4 | .750 | 29 | – | 8 | .784 |
| No. 17 NC State | 12 | – | 4 | .750 | 23 | – | 9 | .719 |
| No. 21 Syracuse | 11 | – | 5 | .688 | 22 | – | 11 | .667 |
| No. 16 Miami (FL) | 10 | – | 6 | .625 | 24 | – | 9 | .727 |
| Virginia | 7 | – | 9 | .438 | 20 | – | 13 | .606 |
| Wake Forest | 6 | – | 10 | .375 | 16 | – | 16 | .500 |
| Georgia Tech | 5 | – | 11 | .313 | 22 | – | 14 | .611 |
| Virginia Tech | 4 | – | 12 | .250 | 20 | – | 14 | .588 |
| Pittsburgh | 4 | – | 12 | .250 | 13 | – | 17 | .433 |
| Clemson | 3 | – | 13 | .188 | 15 | – | 16 | .484 |
| North Carolina | 3 | – | 13 | .188 | 15 | – | 16 | .484 |
| Boston College | 2 | – | 14 | .125 | 9 | – | 21 | .300 |
† 2017 ACC tournament winner As of March 29, 2017; Rankings from AP poll

The 2016–17 Florida State Seminoles women's basketball team, variously Florida State or FSU, represents Florida State University during the 2016–17 NCAA Division I basketball season. Florida State competes in Division I of the National Collegiate Athletic Association (NCAA). The Seminoles are led by head coach Sue Semrau, in her twentieth year, and play their home games at the Donald L. Tucker Center on the university's Tallahassee, Florida campus. They are members of the Atlantic Coast Conference.

Florida State finished the previous season with a 25–8 record. The Seminoles reached the sweet sixteen of the NCAA tournament and center Adut Bulgak went on to be drafted in the first round of the WNBA draft. Prior to the start of the season, Florida State was picked to finish third in the ACC while Leticia Romero and Shakayla Thomas were named to the preseason All-ACC team.

The Seminoles achieved their best start in school history, reaching twenty wins faster than any other FSU team. The seniors - Leticia Romero, Brittany Brown, Ivey Slaughter, and Kai James - became the winningest class in program history. Leticia Romero and Kai James went on to be selected in the WNBA draft.

Florida State finished second in the ACC but was eliminated in the quarterfinals of the ACC tournament. The Seminoles received an at-large bid to the NCAA tournament as a three-seed, their fifth consecutive tournament appearance, reaching the Elite Eight for just the third time in school history.

== Roster ==
2016–17 Florida State Seminoles women's basketball team
Players
Coaches

| Pos. | # | Name | Height | Year | Previous school | Hometown |
|---|---|---|---|---|---|---|
| G | 1 | A'Tyanna Gaulden | 5 ft 7 in (1.7 m) | Fr | Americus Sumter | Edmonton, AB, Canada |
| G | 10 | Leticia Romero | 5 ft 8 in (1.73 m) | RS Sr | I.E.S. Joaquín Artiles; Kansas State | Las Palmas, Spain |
| F | 11 | María Conde | 6 ft 1 in (1.85 m) | So | CB Estudiantes | Madrid, Spain |
| G | 12 | Brittany Brown | 5 ft 8 in (1.73 m) | Sr | Choctawhatchee | Fort Walton Beach, FL |
| G | 13 | Nausia Woolfolk | 5 ft 9 in (1.75 m) | Fr | Peach County | Fort Valley, GA |
| F | 20 | Shakayla Thomas | 5 ft 11 in (1.8 m) | Jr | Sylacauga | Sylacauga, AL |
| F | 23 | Ivey Slaughter | 6 ft 1 in (1.85 m) | Sr | Tattnall Square Academy | Macon, GA |
| G | 24 | Nicole Ekhomu | 5 ft 9 in (1.75 m) | Fr | Joliet Catholic Academy | Bolingbrook, IL |
| C | 25 | Ama Degbeon | 6 ft 2 in (1.88 m) | Jr | Grunberg | Grünberg, Germany |
| G | 32 | Imani Wright | 5 ft 9 in (1.75 m) | RS Jr | Liberty-Eylau; Baylor | Hooks, TX |
| F | 40 | Jasmine Walker | 6 ft 3 in (1.91 m) | Fr | Jefferson Davis | Montgomery, AL |
| C | 42 | Kai James | 6 ft 5 in (1.96 m) | Sr | Dwyer | West Palm Beach, FL |
| C | 50 | Chatrice White | 6 ft 3 in (1.91 m) | Jr | Shelby; Illinois | Shelby, NE |

Head coach

- Sue Semrau (UC San Diego)

Assistant coach(es)

- Lance White (Texas Tech)
- Brooke Wyckoff (Florida State)
- Danielle Atkinson (Florida)

Legend

- (C) Team captain
- (S) Suspended
- (I) Ineligible
- (W) Walk-on
- Injured
- Current redshirt

Roster
Last update: 2015-10-17

=== Depth chart ===
| Pos. | Starting 5 | Bench 1 | Bench 2 |
|---|---|---|---|
| C | Leticia Romero | Maria Conde | A'Tyanna Gaulden |
| PF | Shakayla Thomas | Chatrice White | Kai James |
| SF | Ivey Slaughter | Ama Degbeon |
| SG | Imani Wright | Nausia Woolfolk |
| PG | Brittany Brown | Nicole Ekhomu |

== Rankings ==
Regular season polls
| Poll | Pre- Season | Week 2 | Week 3 | Week 4 | Week 5 | Week 6 | Week 7 | Week 8 | Week 9 | Week 10 | Week 11 | Week 12 | Week 13 | Week 14 | Week 15 | Week 16 | Week 17 | Week 18 | Week 19 | Final |
|---|---|---|---|---|---|---|---|---|---|---|---|---|---|---|---|---|---|---|---|---|
| AP | 12 | 12 | 10 | 8 | 7 | 7 | 7 | 7 | 6 | 7 | 7 | 6 | 6 | 5 | T4 | T8 | 8 | 10 | 10 | N/A |
| Coaches | 12 | 12 | 9 | 8 | 7 | 7 | 7 | 7 | 8 | 7 | 6 | 6 | 5 | 4 | 7 | 11 | 12 | 13 | 13 | 7 |

Legend
| | Increase in ranking |
| | Decrease in ranking |
| | Not ranked previous week |
| (RV) | Received Votes |

== Schedule ==
| Date time, TV | Rank^{#} | Opponent^{#} | Result | Record | High points | High rebounds | High assists | Site (attendance) city, state |
Exhibition
| November 6*; 2:00 p.m. | No. 12 | St. Francis (Illinois) | W 91–38 | – | 20 – Thomas | 8 – Brown | 5 – Brown | Donald L. Tucker Center; Tallahassee, FL |
Regular season
| November 11*; 12:30 p.m., ACCN Extra | No. 12 | Jacksonville State | W 73–62 | 1–0 | 16 – Thomas | 9 – Tied | 6 – Brown | Donald L. Tucker Center (2,859); Tallahassee, FL |
| November 14*; 6:00 p.m., ESPN2 | No. 12 | No. 3 Connecticut; College Hoops Tip-Off Marathon | L 76–78 | 1–1 | 25 – Wright | 10 – Brown | 7 – Brown | Donald L. Tucker Center (4,753); Tallahassee, FL |
| November 17*; 6:00 p.m., ACCN Extra | No. 12 | Jacksonville | W 90–47 | 2–1 | 20 – Thomas | 7 – Slaughter | 6 – Romero | Donald L. Tucker Center (2,519); Tallahassee, FL |
| November 20*; 1:00 p.m., ACCN Extra | No. 12 | James Madison | W 84–64 | 3–1 | 17 – Thomas | 8 – Brown | 6 – Brown | Donald L. Tucker Center (3,030); Tallahassee, FL |
| November 24*; 5:45 p.m. | No. 10 | vs. Winthrop; Paradise Jam tournament (Reef Division) | W 98–35 | 4–1 | 17 – Romero | 5 – Romero | 8 – Gaulsen | Sports and Fitness Center; Saint Thomas, USVI |
| November 25*; 5:45 p.m. | No. 10 | vs. No. 25 Gonzaga; Paradise Jam Tournament (Reef Division) | W 87–69 | 5–1 | 25 – Romero | 7 – Thomas | 7 – Brown | Sports and Fitness Center; Saint Thomas, USVI |
| November 26*; 8:00 p.m. | No. 10 | vs. Michigan; Paradise Jam Tournament (Reef Division) | W 76–62 | 6–1 | 19 – Tied | 11 – Thomas | 7 – Brown | Sports and Fitness Center (2,962); Saint Thomas, USVI |
| November 30*; 7:00 p.m., BTN | No. 8 | at Minnesota; ACC–Big Ten Women's Challenge | W 75–61 | 7–1 | 16 – Ekhomu | 10 – Slaughter | 5 – Romero | Williams Arena (2,213); Minneapolis, MN |
| December 4*; 2:00 p.m., ACCN Extra | No. 8 | Western Carolina | W 90–41 | 8–1 | 18 – Thomas | 9 – James | 5 – Brown | Donald L. Tucker Center (3,037); Tallahassee, FL |
| December 8*; 6:00 p.m., ACCN Extra | No. 7 | No. 23 Florida | W 83–58 | 9–1 | 21 – Romero | 10 – Slaughter | 7 – Brown | Donald L. Tucker Center (3,390); Tallahassee, FL |
| December 10*; 3:00 p.m. | No. 7 | at UAB | W 93–47 | 10–1 | 17 – Brown | 6 – Tied | 6 – Romero | Bartow Arena (457); Birmingham, AL |
| December 19*; 6:00 p.m., ACCN Extra | No. 7 | North Florida | W 95–39 | 11–1 | 22 – Romero | 7 – James | 8 – Brown | Donald L. Tucker Center (2,947); Tallahassee, FL |
| December 21*; 7:00 p.m., ESPN3 | No. 7 | at Mercer | W 83–40 | 12–1 | 17 – Romero | 11 – Slaughter | 5 – Brown | Hawkins Arena (3,227); Macon, GA |
| December 29; 7:00 p.m., ACCN Extra | No. 7 | at No. 11 Miami (FL) | W 81–66 | 13–1 (1–0) | 19 – Tied | 11 – Thomas | 6 – Romero | Watsco Center (1,780); Coral Gables, FL |
| January 2; 7:00 p.m., ACCN Extra | No. 6 | NC State | L 61–70 | 13–2 (1–1) | 20 – Romero | 12 – Slaughter | 3 – Tied | Donald L. Tucker Center (3,059); Tallahassee, FL |
| January 5; 7:00 p.m., ACCN Extra | No. 6 | at North Carolina | W 90–77 | 14–2 (2–1) | 22 – Wright | 11 – White | 10 – Brown | Carmichael Arena (1,528); Chapel Hill, NC |
| January 8; 3:00 p.m., ACCN Extra | No. 6 | No. 13 Duke | W 69–45 | 15–2 (3–1) | 22 – Thomas | 8 – Thomas | 6 – Romero | Donald L. Tucker Center (6,687^); Tallahassee, FL |
| January 12; 7:00 p.m., ACCN Extra | No. 7 | No. 9 Louisville | W 72–65 | 16–2 (4–1) | 24 – Thomas | 11 – Brown | 7 – Brown | Donald L. Tucker Center (4,092); Tallahassee, FL |
| January 15; 2:00 p.m., ACCN Extra | No. 7 | at Clemson | W 86–27 | 17–2 (5–1) | 13 – Degbeon | 7 – James | 3 – Ekhomu | Littlejohn Coliseum (832); Clemson, SC |
| January 19; 7:00 p.m., ACCN Extra | No. 7 | Syracuse | W 77–58 | 18–2 (6–1) | 17 – Thomas | 9 – Brown | 8 – Romero | Donald L. Tucker Center (3,716); Tallahassee, FL |
| January 22; 12:00 p.m., FSN | No. 7 | at No. 17 Virginia Tech | W 82–54 | 19–2 (7–1) | 18 – Romero | 7 – Tied | 5 – Romero | Cassell Coliseum (2,092); Blacksburg, VA |
| January 26; 7:00 p.m., FSN | No. 6 | at Georgia Tech | W 69–63 | 20–2 (8–1) | 17 – Thomas | 6 – Tied | 3 – Tied | Hank McCamish Pavilion (1,017); Atlanta, GA |
| February 2; 7:00 p.m., ACCN Extra | No. 6 | at Boston College | W 85–53 | 21–2 (9–1) | 20 – Thomas | 11 – White | 7 – Romero | Conte Forum (802); Chestnut Hill, MA |
| February 6; 7:00 p.m., RSN | No. 5 | No. 16 Miami (FL) | W 80–71 | 22–2 (10–1) | 19 – Tied | 14 – White | 6 – Brown | Donald L. Tucker Center (3,571); Tallahassee, FL |
| February 9; 7:00 p.m., ACCN Extra | No. 5 | Wake Forest | W 102–60 | 23–2 (11–1) | 23 – Thomas | 10 – Brown | 7 – Brown | Donald L. Tucker Center (2,906); Tallahassee, FL |
| February 13*; 7:00 p.m., ESPN2 | No. 4 | No. 8 Texas | L 88–92 ^{2OT} | 23–3 | 23 – Thomas | 11 – Thomas | 4 – Brown | Donald L. Tucker Center (3,621); Tallahassee, FL |
| February 16; 7:00 p.m., RSN | No. 4 | at Virginia | L 51–60 | 23–4 (11–2) | 12 – Slaughter | 9 – Slaughter | 3 – Romero | John Paul Jones Arena (3,161); Charlottesville, VA |
| February 18; 2:00 p.m., ACCN Extra | No. 4 | Clemson | W 80–47 | 24–4 (12–2) | 14 – Tied | 11 – White | 6 – Romero | Donald L. Tucker Center (3,576); Tallahassee, FL |
| February 23; 7:00 p.m., ACCN Extra | No. 8 | Pittsburgh | W 79–48 | 25–4 (13–2) | 13 – Tied | 7 – Tied | 5 – Tied | Donald L. Tucker Center (4,595); Tallahassee, FL |
| February 26; 1:00 p.m., ESPN2 | No. 8 | at No. 5 Notre Dame | L 61–79 | 25–5 (13–3) | 16 – Brown | 6 – Brown | 3 – Brown | Edmund P. Joyce Center (9,149); South Bend, IN |
ACC Women's tournament
| March 3; 6:00 p.m., RSN/ACCN | (2) No. 8 | vs. (7) No. 16 Miami (FL); Quarterfinals | L 54–56 | 25–6 | 14 – Romero | 9 – Tied | 5 – Romero | HTC Center (3,600); Conway, SC |
NCAA Women's tournament
| March 17*; 7:30 p.m., ESPN2 | (3 S) No. 10 | (14 S) Western Illinois; First round | W 87–66 | 26–6 | 23 – Thomas | 14 – Tied | 6 – Brown | Donald L. Tucker Center (4,147); Tallahassee, FL |
| March 19*; 7:10 p.m., ESPN2 | (3 S) No. 10 | (6 S) No. 25 Missouri; Second round | W 77–55 | 27–6 | 20 – Thomas | 11 – Thomas | 8 – Brown | Donald L. Tucker Center (4,084); Tallahassee, FL |
| March 25*; 6:30 p.m., ESPN | (3 S) No. 10 | vs. (2 S) No. 8 Oregon State; Sweet Sixteen | W 66–53 | 28–6 | 18 – Romero | 11 – Thomas | 4 – Brown | Stockton Arena (4,500); Stockton, CA |
| March 27*; 9:00 p.m., ESPN | (3 S) No. 10 | vs. (1 S) No. 3 South Carolina; Elite Eight | L 64–71 | 28–7 | 16 – Romero | 10 – Slaughter | 6 – Romero | Stockton Arena (3,134); Stockton, CA |
*Non-conference game. ^{#}Rankings from AP Poll. (#) Tournament seedings in parentheses. S=Stockton Region. All times are in Eastern Time.

^Denotes the largest crowd in program history

== Awards ==
- Naismith Coach of the Year Award semifinalist

Sue Semrau

=== Watchlists ===
- Naismith Trophy

Leticia Romero
Shakayla Thomas

- Wade Trophy

Leticia Romero
Shakayla Thomas

- Wooden Award

Leticia Romero

=== Honors ===
Yearly awards
| Player | Award | Ref. |
|---|---|---|
| Chatrice White | ACC Sixth Player of the Year | |
| Shakayla Thomas | ACC Player of the Year | |
| Lance White | Assistant coach of the Year | |

==== All-ACC ====
| Name | Selection |
|---|---|
| Leticia Romero | First Team/Second Team |
| Shakayla Thomas | First Team |
| Brittany Brown | Defensive Team |

==== All-Americans ====
| Name | Selection |
|---|---|
| Leticia Romero | Associated Press Honorable Mention; WBCA Honorable Mention; Senior CLASS First Team |
| Shakayla Thomas | Associated Press Honorable Mention; WBCA Honorable Mention |

== WNBA draft ==
Two players were selected in the 2017 WNBA draft, marking the third time in school history that multiple players were selected.

| Round | Pick (Overall) | Name | Team |
|---|---|---|---|
| 2nd | 4 (16) | Leticia Romero | Connecticut Sun |
| 3rd | 10 (34) | Kai James | New York Liberty |
