= Sue Semrau =

American collegiate basketball coach

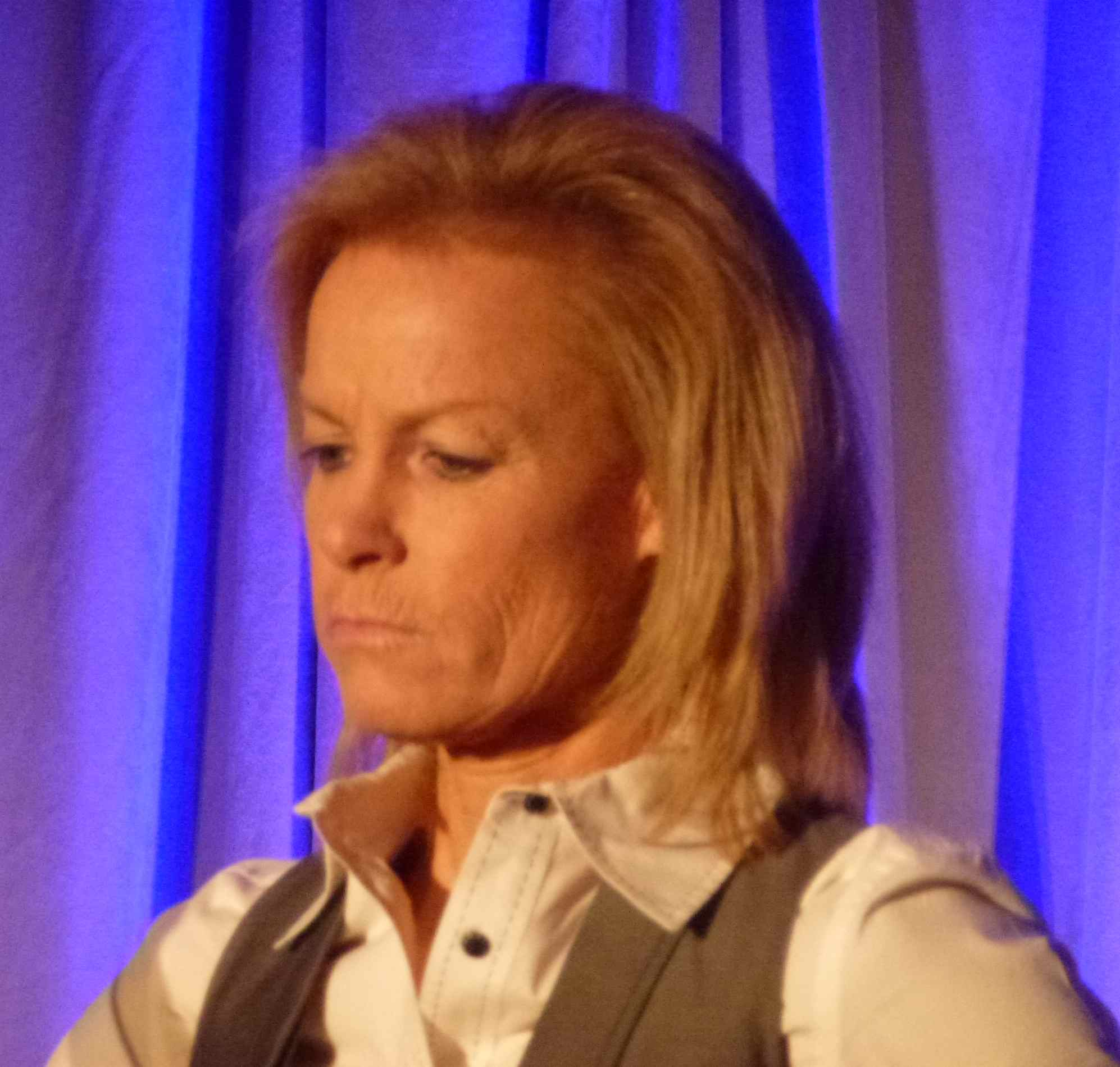

Biographical details
- Born: March 9, 1962 (age 64); Seattle, Washington, U.S.
- Education: UC San Diego

Coaching career (HC unless noted)
- 1987–1991: Occidental College
- 1991–1994: Northern Illinois (asst.)
- 1994–1997: Wisconsin (asst.)
- 1997–2020: Florida State
- 2021–2022: Florida State

Head coaching record
- Overall: 492–271 (.645) includes 22 wins vacated by NCAA in 2006–07 and 2007–08
Medal record
Assistant Coach for United States
FIBA Under-19 World Championship
Gold medal – first place	2011 Chile	Team competition
FIBA Americas Under-18 Championship
Gold medal – first place	2010 Colorado Springs	Team competition

Susan Paige Semrau (born March 9, 1962) is the former head women's basketball coach at Florida State University. From 1997 through 2022, Semrau compiled a 468-252 career record at FSU. She retired after her 24th season at FSU. During the 2020–21 season she took a leave of absence to care for her mother. She guided the Seminoles to appearances in the NCAA tournament 15 total times, including 14 out of the past 15 seasons including three Elite Eights. Until her final season, Semrau at FSU never lost a 1st Round NCAA tournament game, going 15-0. In the 2019–20 season, she hit the 200 ACC wins milestone as a head coach.

Prior to being at Florida State, she was the head coach of Division III's Occidental College for four seasons before spending six seasons as an assistant coach at Northern Illinois University (1991–92 and 1993–94) and the University of Wisconsin (1994–95 and 1996–97).

Semrau grew up in the state of Washington, and attended Shorecrest High School in Seattle. At first, she stayed in Washington for college, playing for Puget Sound for two years before transferring to UC-San Diego for her final two seasons.

== Career milestones ==
- All-time winningest coach at Florida State University
- 200 career wins in the Atlantic Coast Conference (ACC)
- Defeated Clemson at Clemson for the first time in school history
- Eight straight wins over the Clemson Tigers (school record)
- Defeated Virginia for the first time in school history
- 3-time Atlantic Coast Conference Coach of the Year
- 2-time co-champions of the ACC
- First Sweet 16 appearance in 2006–2007 season
- Named United States Marine Corps/WBCA Division I National Coach of the Year
- 2013—Kay Yow Heart Coach of the Year
- 2015—Associated Press College Basketball Coach of the Year

== Coaching record ==
Record table
Season	Team	Overall	Conference	Standing	Postseason
Florida State (Atlantic Coast Conference) (1997–2022)
1997–98	Florida State	9–18	5–11	7th	
1998–99	Florida State	7–20	2–14	9th	
1999–00	Florida State	12–17	4–12	8th	
2000–01	Florida State	19–12	9–7	4th	NCAA round of 32
2001–02	Florida State	13–15	4–12	9th	
2002–03	Florida State	17–13	8–8	4th	WNIT Second Round
2003–04	Florida State	15–15	7–9	5th	WNIT Second Round
2004–05	Florida State	24–8	9–5	4th	NCAA round of 32
2005–06	Florida State	20–10	10–4	4th	NCAA round of 32
2006–07	Florida State	24–10 *	10–4	4th	NCAA Sweet Sixteen
2007–08	Florida State	19–14 *	7–7	5th	NCAA round of 32
2008–09	Florida State	26–8	12–2	T-1st	NCAA round of 32
2009–10	Florida State	29–6	12–2	T-1st	NCAA Elite Eight
2010–11	Florida State	24–8	11–3	3rd	NCAA round of 32
2011–12	Florida State	14–17	6–10	8th	
2012–13	Florida State	23–10	11–7	4th	NCAA round of 32
2013–14	Florida State	21–12	7–9	9th	NCAA round of 32
2014–15	Florida State	32–5	14–2	2nd	NCAA Elite Eight
2015–16	Florida State	25–8	13–3	T-3rd	NCAA Sweet Sixteen
2016–17	Florida State	28–7	13–3	T-2nd	NCAA Elite Eight
2017–18	Florida State	26–7	12–4	3rd	NCAA round of 32
2018–19	Florida State	24–9	10–6	6th	NCAA round of 32
2019–20	Florida State	24–8	11–7	T-4th	Postseason cancelled
2021–22	Florida State	17–14	10–8	T-7th	NCAA First Four
Florida State:		492–271 (.645)	217–159 (.577)		
Total:		492–271 (.645)			
National champion Postseason invitational champion Conference regular season champion Conference regular season and conference tournament champion Division regular season champion Division regular season and conference tournament champion Conference tournament champion

* 16 wins in 2006–07 and 6 wins in 2007–08 vacated by NCAA
