= 2016–17 Jacksonville Dolphins women's basketball team =

Intercollegiate basketball season

2016–17 Jacksonville Dolphins women's basketball
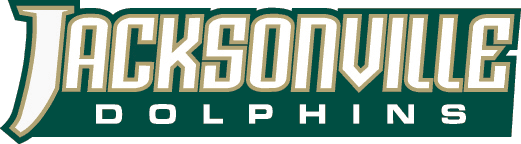

WNIT, First Round
- Conference: Atlantic Sun Conference
- Record: 23–9 (11–3 A-Sun)
- Head coach: Yolett McPhee-McCuin (4th season)
- Assistant coaches: Darnell Haney; Camille Collier; Ed Mahan
- Home arena: Swisher Gymnasium

2016–17 ASUN women's basketball standings
	Conf.				Overall
Team	W		L	PCT	W		L	PCT
Stetson	13	–	1	.929	26	–	7	.788
Florida Gulf Coast †	12	–	2	.857	26	–	9	.743
Jacksonville	11	–	3	.786	23	–	9	.719
Kennesaw State	8	–	6	.571	10	–	20	.333
NJIT	4	–	10	.286	11	–	19	.367
North Florida	3	–	11	.214	10	–	20	.333
Lipscomb	3	–	11	.214	6	–	24	.200
USC Upstate	2	–	12	.143	9	–	21	.300
† 2017 ASUN Tournament winner As of March 18, 2017; Rankings from AP poll

The 2016–17 Jacksonville Dolphins women's basketball team represented Jacksonville University in the 2016–17 NCAA Division I women's basketball season. The Dolphins, led by fourth year head coach Yolett McPhee-McCuin, played their home games at Swisher Gymnasium and were members of the Atlantic Sun Conference. They finished the season 23–9, 11–3 in A-Sun play finish in third place. They advanced to the semifinals of the 2017 Atlantic Sun women's basketball tournament where they lost to Florida Gulf Coast. They were invited to the WNIT, where they lost to Georgia Tech in the first round.

== Media ==
All home games and conference road games were shown on ESPN3 or A-Sun.TV.

== Roster ==
2016–17 Jacksonville Dolphins women's basketball team
Players
Coaches

Pos.	#	Name	Height	Year	Previous school	Hometown
G	1	Alexis Burns	5 ft 8 in (1.73 m)	Fr	Carver	Columbus, GA
G	3	Ro Hayes	5 ft 7 in (1.7 m)	RS Fr	Viera; Florida Atlantic	Rockledge, FL
G	4	Brandi Buie	5 ft 8 in (1.73 m)	Jr	Randolph-Clay	Tampa, FL
G	5	Jillah Moede	5 ft 8 in (1.73 m)	So	Centennial	Houston, TX
G	11	Kayla Nevitt (I) (redshirt)	5 ft 10 in (1.78 m)	Jr	Andy Dekaney HS; Mississippi State	Houston, TX
F	13	Kimberly Dawkins	6 ft 0 in (1.83 m)	Sr	Jonesboro	Atlanta, GA
G	14	Yamaris Guevarez	5 ft 8 in (1.73 m)	Fr	Booker	Sarasota, FL
F	15	Kayla Gordon	6 ft 0 in (1.83 m)	Jr	Meridian	Meridian, MS
C	20	Shalonda Neely	6 ft 0 in (1.83 m)	So	Arlington Country Day	Freeport, Grand Bahama
F	21	Christin Mercer	6 ft 1 in (1.85 m)	RS Sr	Douglas County; Florida	Douglasville, GA
G	22	Sherranda Reddick	5 ft 8 in (1.73 m)	Sr	Ribault	Jacksonville, FL
F/C	23	Khadijah Brown	6 ft 4 in (1.93 m)	Fr	South Miami	Miami, FL
G	24	Jasmyn Brown	5 ft 10 in (1.78 m)	So	Haines City	Haines City, FL
F/C	32	Amber Bender	6 ft 2 in (1.88 m)	Fr	Calvary Christian Academy	Fort Lauderdale, FL
F	44	LaKaris Salter (I) (redshirt)	6 ft 1 in (1.85 m)	Jr	FAMU DRS; Mississippi State	Tallahassee, FL

Head coach

- Yolett McPhee-McCuin (Rhode Island)

Assistant coach(es)

- Darnell Haney (Florida A&M)
- Camille Collier (Wake Forest)
- Ed Mahan (Clemson)

Legend

- (C) Team captain
- (S) Suspended
- (I) Ineligible
- (W) Walk-on
- Injured
- Current redshirt

Roster

== Schedule ==
Date time, TV	Rank^{#}	Opponent^{#}	Result	Record	Site (attendance) city, state
Non-conference regular season
11/11/2016*; 7:00 pm, ESPN3		Thomas (GA)	W 100–43	1–0	Swisher Gymnasium (503); Jacksonville, FL
11/13/2016*; 2:00 pm, ESPN3		Bethune-Cookman	W 69–63	2–0	Swisher Gymnasium (322); Jacksonville, FL
11/17/2016*; 6:00 pm, ACCN Extra		at No. 12 Florida State	L 47–90	2–1	Donald L. Tucker Center (2,519); Tallahassee, FL
11/21/2016*; 7:00 pm		at South Florida	L 52–64	2–2	USF Sun Dome (1,776); Tampa, FL
11/25/2016*; 2:00 pm, ESPN3		Nicholls State; JU Thanksgiving Classic	W 76–71	3–2	Swisher Gymnasium (366); Jacksonville, FL
11/26/2016*; 2:00 pm, ESPN3		South Alabama; JU Thanksgiving Classic	W 62–55	4–2	Swisher Gymnasium (319); Jacksonville, FL
11/29/2016*; 7:00 pm		at Savannah State	W 55–40	5–2	Tiger Arena (659); Savannah, GA
12/03/2016*; 7:00 pm		at FIU	W 71–56	6–2	FIU Arena (406); Miami, FL
12/06/2016*; 12:00 pm, ESPN3		Johnson & Wales (FL)	W 110–31	7–2	Swisher Gymnasium (1,011); Jacksonville, FL
12/10/2016*; 2:00 pm, ESPN3		Troy	W 77–70	8–2	Swisher Gymnasium (590); Jacksonville, FL
12/16/2016*; 7:00 pm, ESPN3		Florida Memorial	W 76–51	9–2	Swisher Gymnasium (310); Jacksonville, FL
12/20/2016*; 7:00 pm		vs. North Carolina; Crescom Bank Holiday Invitational	L 57–87	9–3	Myrtle Beach Convention Center (1,121); Myrtle Beach, SC
12/28/2016*; 7:00 pm		at Auburn	L 41–53	9–4	Auburn Arena (1,803); Auburn, AL
12/30/2016*; 1:00 pm		vs. UC Davis; Best Western UNF New Year Classic	W 61–54	10–4	UNF Arena (162); Jacksonville, FL
12/31/2016*; 1:00 pm		vs. Wofford; Best Western UNF New Year Classic	W 66–60	11–4	UNF Arena (134); Jacksonville, FL
Atlantic Sun regular season
01/07/2017; 1:00 pm, ESPN3		North Florida	W 68–58	12–4 (1–0)	Swisher Gymnasium (677); Jacksonville, FL
01/14/2017; 4:30 pm, ESPN3		at USC Upstate	W 65–47	13–4 (2–0)	G. B. Hodge Center (325); Spartanburg, SC
01/16/2017; 7:00 pm, ESPN3		at NJIT	W 75–56	14–4 (3–0)	Fleisher Center (355); Newark, NJ
01/21/2017; 1:00 pm, ESPN3		Kennesaw State	W 72–48	15–4 (4–0)	Swisher Gymnasium (578); Jacksonville, FL
01/23/2017; 7:00 pm, ESPN3		Lipscomb	W 84–60	16–4 (5–0)	Swisher Gymnasium (585); Jacksonville, FL
01/28/2017; 4:00 pm, ESPN3		at Florida Gulf Coast	L 57–60	16–5 (5–1)	Alico Arena (2,122); Fort Myers, FL
02/02/2017; 7:00 pm, ESPN3		Stetson	L 49–65	16–6 (5–2)	Swisher Gymnasium (632); Jacksonville, TN
02/04/2017; 1:00 pm, ESPN3		Florida Gulf Coast	W 73–65	17–6 (6–2)	Swisher Gymnasium (700); Jacksonville, FL
02/08/2017; 7:00 pm, ESPN3		at Stetson	L 47–57 ^{OT}	17–7 (6–3)	Edmunds Center (611); DeLand, FL
02/11/2017; 1:00 pm, ESPN3		NJIT	W 75–59	18–7 (7–3)	Swisher Gymnasium (633); Jacksonville, FL
02/13/2017; 7:00 pm, ESPN3		USC Upstate	W 59–46	19–7 (8–3)	Swisher Gymnasium (499); Jacksonville, FL
02/18/2017; 2:30 pm, ESPN3		at Lipscomb	W 73–67	20–7 (9–3)	Allen Arena (522); Nashville, TN
02/20/2017; 7:00 pm, ESPN3		at Kennesaw State	W 74–62	21–7 (10–3)	KSU Convocation Center (531); Kennesaw, GA
02/25/2017; 1:00 pm, ESPN3		at North Florida	W 69–59	22–7 (11–3)	UNF Arena (503); Jacksonville, FL
Atlantic Sun Women's Tournament
03/03/2017; 7:00 pm, ESPN3	(3)	(6) Lipscomb; Quarterfinals	W 91–64	23–7	UNF Arena (603); Jacksonville, FL
03/08/2017; 7:00 pm, ESPN3	(3)	(4) Kennesaw State; Semifinals	L 64–68	23–8	UNF Arena (1,203); Jacksonville, FL
WNIT
03/16/2017*; 7:00 pm		at Georgia Tech; First Round	L 55–71	23–9	Hank McCamish Pavilion (766); Atlanta, GA
*Non-conference game. ^{#}Rankings from AP Poll. (#) Tournament seedings in parentheses. All times are in Eastern Time.

== Rankings ==
Ranking movement Legend: ██ Increase in ranking. ██ Decrease in ranking. NR = Not ranked. RV = Received votes.
Poll	Pre- Season	Week 2	Week 3	Week 4	Week 5	Week 6	Week 7	Week 8	Week 9	Week 10	Week 11	Week 12	Week 13	Week 14	Week 15	Week 16	Week 17	Week 18	Week 19	Final
AP	NR	NR	NR	NR	NR	NR	NR	NR	NR	NR	NR	NR	NR	NR	NR	NR	NR			N/A
Coaches	NR	NR	NR	NR	NR	NR	NR	NR	NR	NR	NR	NR	NR	NR	NR	RV	RV			

== See also ==
- 2016–17 Jacksonville Dolphins men's basketball team
