= 2016–17 Lipscomb Bisons women's basketball team =

Intercollegiate basketball season

2016–17 Lipscomb Bisons women's basketball
- Conference: Atlantic Sun Conference
- Record: 6–24 (3–11 A-Sun)
- Head coach: Greg Brown (5th season)
- Assistant coaches: Courtney Locke; Natalie Jarrett; Clay Crothers
- Home arena: Allen Arena

2016–17 ASUN women's basketball standings
	Conf.				Overall
Team	W		L	PCT	W		L	PCT
Stetson	13	–	1	.929	26	–	7	.788
Florida Gulf Coast †	12	–	2	.857	26	–	9	.743
Jacksonville	11	–	3	.786	23	–	9	.719
Kennesaw State	8	–	6	.571	10	–	20	.333
NJIT	4	–	10	.286	11	–	19	.367
North Florida	3	–	11	.214	10	–	20	.333
Lipscomb	3	–	11	.214	6	–	24	.200
USC Upstate	2	–	12	.143	9	–	21	.300
† 2017 ASUN Tournament winner As of March 18, 2017; Rankings from AP poll

The 2016–17 Lipscomb Bisons women's basketball team represented Lipscomb University in the 2016–17 NCAA Division I women's basketball season. The Bisons, led by fifth year head coach Greg Brown, played their home games at Allen Arena and were members of the Atlantic Sun Conference. They finished the season 6–24, 3–11 in A-Sun play to finish in a tie for sixth place. They lost in the quarterfinals of A-Sun Tournament to Jacksonville.

== Media ==
All home games and conference road will be shown on ESPN3 or A-Sun. TV. Non conference road games will typically be available on the opponents website.

== Roster ==
2016–17 Lipscomb Bisons women's basketball team
Players
Coaches

Pos.	#	Name	Height	Year	Previous school	Hometown
F	0	Loshaveon Jones	5 ft 10 in (1.78 m)	Jr	Daytona State	Rockledge, FL
G	2	Kennedy Potts	5 ft 10 in (1.78 m)	Jr	Harpeth Hall School	Nashville, TN
G	3	Meredith Lovelady	5 ft 9 in (1.75 m)	Jr	Shelton State	Madison, WI
F	4	Jessica Davies	6 ft 1 in (1.85 m)	So	Charnwood College	Watford, England
G	5	Carleigh Short	5 ft 6 in (1.68 m)	Fr	Hendersonville	Hendersonville, TN
G	10	Anna Buhigas {{{last}}}	5 ft 7 in (1.7 m)	Sr	Scioto	Columbus, OH
G	11	Amber Fuqua	6 ft 0 in (1.83 m)	Jr	Sycamore	Nashville, TN
G	12	Auriana Broughton	5 ft 10 in (1.78 m)	Jr	Georgia Highlands College	Lithonia, GA
G	13	Emmy Allen	5 ft 4 in (1.63 m)	Fr	Ravenwood	Brentwood, TN
G	14	Lexi Manos	5 ft 5 in (1.65 m)	Fr	Hoover	North Canton, OH
G	15	Lauren Rau	5 ft 5 in (1.65 m)	Fr	Center Grove	Greenwood, IN
G	21	Kaylee Cotton	5 ft 10 in (1.78 m)	Fr	McCreary Central	Stearns, KY
G	22	Loren Cagle	5 ft 5 in (1.65 m)	RS Jr	Lipscomb Academy	Nashville, TN
G	23	Bri Melton	5 ft 8 in (1.73 m)	So	Smith County	McMinnville, TN
F	24	Alex Gates	5 ft 11 in (1.8 m)	RS Sr	Beech	Hendersonville, TN
F	25	Morgan Turner	6 ft 2 in (1.88 m)	So	Meade County	Guston, KY
F	26	Emily Kmec	6 ft 2 in (1.88 m)	Fr	Carmel	Carmel, IN
F	32	Laure Assena	6 ft 0 in (1.83 m)	Jr	Arizona Western College	Yaoundé, Cameroon
F	42	Riley Northway	6 ft 2 in (1.88 m)	So	Brewer	Somerville, AL

Head coach

- Greg Brown (Lipscomb)

Assistant coach(es)

- Courtney Locke (Rutgers)
- Natalie Jarrett (UCLA)
- Clay Crothers (Lipscomb)

Legend

- (C) Team captain
- (S) Suspended
- (I) Ineligible
- (W) Walk-on
- Injured
- Current redshirt

Roster

== Schedule ==
Date time, TV	Rank^{#}	Opponent^{#}	Result	Record	Site (attendance) city, state
Exhibition
10/27/2016*; 6:30 pm		Freed–Hardeman	L 64–81		Allen Arena (226); Nashville, TN
11/07/2016*; 4:00 pm		Rhodes	W 83–45		Allen Arena; Nashville, TN
Non-conference regular season
11/11/2016*; 6:00 pm		at Loyola (MD)	L 30–74	0–1	Reitz Arena (523); Baltimore, MD
11/13/2016*; 5:00 pm		at Ole Miss	L 49–76	0–2	The Pavilion at Ole Miss (770); Oxford, MS
11/17/2016*; 7:00 pm		at Alabama	L 35–82	0–3	Coleman Coliseum (1,082); Tuscaloosa, AL
11/20/2016*; 2:00 pm, ESPN3		Anderson (South Carolina)	W 66–59	1–3	Allen Arena (550); Nashville, TN
11/22/2016*; 6:00 pm		at Murray State	L 59–79	1–4	CFSB Center (219); Murray, KY
11/26/2016*; 4:00 pm		Charleston Southern	L 52–67	1–5	Allen Arena; Nashville, TN
11/29/2016*; 5:00 pm		at Belmont; Battle of the Boulevard	L 62–100	1–6	Curb Event Center (1,154); Nashville, TN
12/03/2016*; 11:00 am		at Morehead State	L 53–73	1–7	Ellis Johnson Arena (500); Morehead, KY
12/06/2016*; 6:30 pm		at Southeast Missouri State	L 63–79	1–8	Show Me Center (614); Cape Girardeau, MO
12/11/2016*; 2:00 pm, ESPN3		Tennessee State	L 71–77 ^{OT}	1–9	Allen Arena (747); Nashville, TN
12/15/2016*; 7:00 pm		at WKU	L 35–87	1–10	E. A. Diddle Arena (1,120); Bowling Green, KY
12/18/2016*; 2:00 pm, ESPN3		at Ball State	W 78–74	2–10	Worthen Arena (892); Muncie, IN
12/21/2016*; 12:00 pm, ESPN3		Tennessee Tech	W 71–69 ^{OT}	3–10	Allen Arena (610); Nashville, TN
12/29/2016*; 6:30 pm, ESPN3		Saint Louis	L 38–83	3–11	Allen Arena (234); Nashville, TN
12/31/2016*; 12:00 pm		Princeton	L 43–71	3–12	Allen Arena (253); Nashville, TN
Atlantic Sun regular season
01/07/2017; 1:30 pm, ESPN3		Kennesaw State	L 55–70	3–13 (0–1)	Allen Arena (560); Nashville, TN
01/14/2017; 1:30 pm, ESPN3		Florida Gulf Coast	L 63–90	3–14 (0–2)	Allen Arena (205); Nashville, TN
01/16/2017; 6:30 pm, ESPN3		Stetson	L 66–91	3–15 (0–3)	Allen Arena (550); Nashville, TN
01/21/2017; 12:00 pm, ESPN3		at North Florida	W 60–58	4–15 (1–3)	UNF Arena (258); Jacksonville, FL
01/23/2017; 6:00 pm, ESPN3		at Jacksonville	L 60–84	4–16 (1–4)	Swisher Gymnasium (585); Jacksonville, FL
01/28/2017; 12:00 pm, ESPN3		at NJIT	L 68–76	4–17 (1–5)	Fleisher Center (300); Newark, NJ
02/02/2017; 6:30 pm, ESPN3		USC Upstate	W 84–77	5–17 (2–5)	Allen Arena (592); Nashville, TN
02/04/2017; 1:30 pm, ESPN3		NJIT	L 53–76	5–18 (2–6)	Allen Arena (560); Nashville, TN
02/08/2017; 6:00 pm, ESPN3		at USC Upstate	L 75–89	5–19 (2–7)	G. B. Hodge Center (402); Spartanburg, SC
02/11/2017; 12:00 pm, ESPN3		at Stetson	L 43–60	5–20 (2–8)	Edmunds Center (463); DeLand, FL
02/13/2017; 6:00 pm, ESPN3		at Florida Gulf Coast	L 50–98	5–21 (2–9)	Alico Arena (1,648); Fort Myers, FL
02/18/2017; 1:30 pm, ESPN3		Jacksonville	L 67–73	5–22 (2–10)	Allen Arena (522); Nashville, TN
02/20/2017; 6:30 pm, ESPN3		North Florida	W 66–62	6–22 (3–10)	Allen Arena (215); Nashville, TN
02/25/2017; 1:00 pm, ESPN3		at Kennesaw State	L 69–96	6–23 (3–11)	KSU Convocation Center (471); Kennesaw, GA
Atlantic Sun Women's Tournament
03/03/2017; 7:00 pm, ESPN3	(6)	at (3) Jacksonville; Quarterfinals	L 64–91	6–24	Swisher Gymnasium (603); Jacksonville, FL
*Non-conference game. ^{#}Rankings from AP Poll. (#) Tournament seedings in parentheses. All times are in Central Time.

== See also ==
- 2016–17 Lipscomb Bisons men's basketball team
