= 2013–14 Florida Gulf Coast Eagles women's basketball team =

Intercollegiate basketball season

2013–14 Florida Gulf Coast Eagles women's basketball
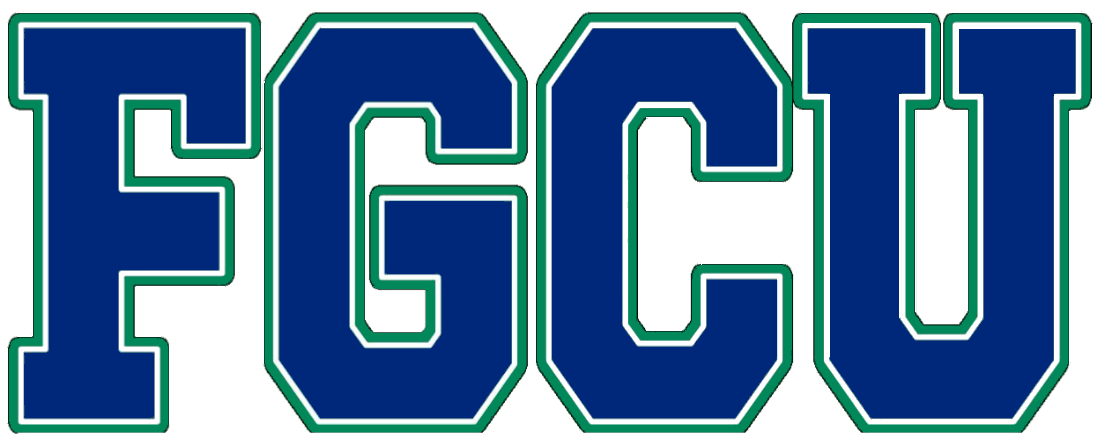

Atlantic Sun Regular Season Champions Atlantic Sun Tournament Champions

NCAA Women's Tournament, first round
- Conference: Atlantic Sun Conference
- Record: 26–8 (17–1 A-Sun)
- Head coach: Karl Smesko (12th season)
- Assistant coaches: Abby Scharlow; Chelsea Dermyer; Chelsea Lyles
- Home arena: Alico Arena

2013–14 Atlantic Sun women's basketball standings
	Conf.				Overall
Team	W		L	PCT	W		L	PCT
FGCU†	17	–	1	.944	26	–	8	.765
Stetson	16	–	2	.889	27	–	8	.771
Northern Kentucky*	13	–	5	.722	18	–	13	.581
USC Upstate	11	–	7	.611	17	–	15	.531
Jacksonville	10	–	8	.556	13	–	17	.433
Mercer	9	–	9	.500	17	–	14	.548
East Tennessee State	5	–	13	.278	9	–	21	.300
Kennesaw State	4	–	14	.222	6	–	24	.200
Lipscomb	3	–	15	.167	6	–	24	.200
North Florida	2	–	16	.111	6	–	23	.207
† 2014 Atlantic Sun Tournament *ineligible for postseason play due to Div. I transition winner As of March 16, 2014; Rankings from AP Poll

The 2013–14 Florida Gulf Coast Eagles women's basketball team represented Florida Gulf Coast University (FGCU) in the 2013–14 NCAA Division I women's basketball season. FGCU was a member of the Atlantic Sun Conference.

== Roster changes ==
=== Departures ===
- Lerrin Cook, (now Lerrin Michel) a senior with the 2012–13 team, graduated.
- Brittany Kennedy, a senior with the 2012–13 team, graduated, and signed a professional contract with the Saarlouis Royals located in Saarlouis, Germany.
- Betsy Adams, who played one year at FGCU after four years at Valparaiso completed her remaining year of eligibility. She played three seasons for the Crusaders, then missed her senior year with an injury, and transferred to FGCU as a graduate student.
- Joyce Iamstrong, a senior with the 2012–13 team, graduated.

=== Incoming players ===
- Kaneisha Atwater—sophomore transfer from Virginia Commonwealth
- Randa Payne—a walk-on freshman from Mansfield, Ohio
- Haley Laughter—a freshman from Asheville, North Carolina
- Morgan Blumer—a freshman from Milton, Wisconsin

=== Status changes ===
Taylor Gradinjan played limited minutes in 2012–13 due to an ACL tear, but re-injured the same knee in September and will miss this entire season. Kaneisha Atwater transferred to FGCU from Virginia Commonwealth; the NCAA initially denied the request for a waiver of the standard rule requiring transfers to sit out a year because she is moving institutions to be closer to her son but later approved the request after FGCU appealed the decision. Stephanie Haas played the 2012–13 as a walk-on, but earned a scholarship for the current season. Jessica Cattani is a freshman who tried out and made the team as a walk-on. Jenna Cobb joined the team a year ago as a transfer from Butler, but sat out the 2012–13 season per transfer rules.

== Roster ==
2013–14 Florida Gulf Coast Eagles women's basketball team
Players
Coaches

Pos.	#	Name	Height	Year	Previous school	Hometown
G	0	DyTiesha Dunson	5 ft 8 in (1.73 m)	So	Westover HS	Albany, Ga.
G	1	Jessica Cattani (W)	5 ft 7 in (1.7 m)	Fr	Muskego High School	Muskego, Wisc
G	2	Kaneisha Atwater	5 ft 7 in (1.7 m)	So	VCU/Fort Pierce Westwood HS	Fort Pierce, Fla.
F	3	Katie Meador	5 ft 11 in (1.8 m)	So	Salem Community HS	Salem, Ill.
F	4	Bethany Murrell	5 ft 10 in (1.78 m)	So	New Palestine HS	New Palestine, Ind.
G	5	Sarah Hansen (C)	5 ft 10 in (1.78 m)	RS Sr	General McLane HS	McKean, Pa.
G	11	Amanda Moore	5 ft 10 in (1.78 m)	So	Seymour HS	Seymour, Ind.
G	12	Stephanie Haas	5 ft 8 in (1.73 m)	So	Magnificat HS	Avon Lake, Ohio
F	13	Anthi Chatzigiakoumi	6 ft 1 in (1.85 m)	Jr	General Sr. HS of Kallithea	Athens, Greece
G	14	Whitney Knight	6 ft 3 in (1.91 m)	RS So	R.J. Reynolds HS	Winston-Salem, N.C.
G	15	Randa Payne (W)	5 ft 9 in (1.75 m)	Fr	Mansfield St. Peters HS	Mansfield, Ohio
F	20	Haley Laughter	5 ft 11 in (1.8 m)	Fr	Carolina Day School	Asheville, N.C.
G	21	Jaime Gluesing	5 ft 10 in (1.78 m)	So	Solon HS	Solon, Ohio
G	22	Jenna Cobb (C)	5 ft 7 in (1.7 m)	RS Jr	Miami Trace HS/Butler	New Holland, Ohio
G	23	Morgan Blumer	5 ft 11 in (1.8 m)	Fr	Milton HS	Milton, Wisc.
G	24	Taylor Gradinjan (injured)	5 ft 9 in (1.75 m)	RS Fr	Cudahy HS	Cudahy, Wisc.

Head coach

Karl Smesko (Kent State '93)

Assistant coach(es)

Abby Scharlow (Wisconsin-Green Bay '05)
Chelsea Dermyer (FGCU '07)
Chelsea Lyles (FGCU '10)

Legend

- (C) Team captain
- (S) Suspended
- (I) Ineligible
- (W) Walk-on
- Injured
- Current redshirt

Roster
Last update: 2013-08-17

== Schedule ==
All conference games not shown on ESPN3 will be shown on A-Sun.TV. The home game against Bethune-Cookman will also be shown on A-Sun.TV.

Date time, TV	Opponent	Result	Record	High points	High rebounds	High assists	Site (attendance) city, state
11/08/2013*; 6 p.m.	at FIU	W 75–55	1–0	25 – Knight	9 – Hansen	4 – Hansen	U.S. Century Bank Arena (506); Miami, FL
11/12/2013*; 7:05 p.m.	Bethune-Cookman	W 71–38	2–0	14 – Knight	10 – Hansen	2 – Tied	Alico Arena (1,828); Ft. Myers, FL
11/20/2013*; 7:05 p.m., ESPN3	Charlotte	W 78–73	3–0	19 – Haas	7 – Tied	4 – Knight	Alico Arena (1,673); Ft. Myers, FL
11/23/2013*; 8 p.m.	at Southern Miss	L 74-76	3–1	24 – Hansen	6 – Tied	4 – Cobb	Reed Green Coliseum (1,109); Hattiesburg, MS
11/26/2013*; 7:30 p.m.	vs. TCU; Hardwood Tournament of Hope	L 47-68	3–2	21 – Knight	7 – Hansen	4 – Haas	Puerto Vallarta International Convention Center (100); Puerto Vallarta, Mexico
11/27/2013*; 5 p.m.	vs. Stanford; Hardwood Tournament of Hope	L 59-83	3–3	15 – Atwater	6 – Tied	5 – Cobb	Puerto Vallarta International Convention Center; Puerto Vallarta, Mexico
11/29/2013*; 2:30 p.m.	vs. South Dakota State; Hardwood Tournament of Hope	W 84–59	4–3	18 – Haas	8 – Hansen	6 – Cobb	Puerto Vallarta International Convention Center (100); Puerto Vallarta, Mexico
12/04/2013*; 7:05 p.m., ESPN3	South Florida	W 60–55	5–3	22 – Haas	10 – Knight	4 – Haas	Alico Arena (1,721); Ft. Myers, FL
12/17/2013*; 8 p.m.	at No. 12 LSU	L 46-69	5–4	15 – Hansen	5 – Cobb	3 – Haas	Pete Maravich Assembly Center (2,190); Baton Rouge, LA
12/20/2013*; 7:05 p.m., ESPN3	Saint Francis (PA); FGCU Hilton Garden Inn/ Homewood Suites Classic	W 75–68	6–4	17 – Tied	12 – Tied	5 – Cobb	Alico Arena (1,453); Ft. Myers, FL
12/21/2013*; 7:05 p.m., ESPN3	Virginia; FGCU Hilton Garden Inn/ Homewood Suites Classic	L 56-85	6–5	13 – Atwater	5 – Hansen	7 – Hansen	Alico Arena (1,832); Ft. Myers, FL
12/29/2013*; 6:05 p.m., ESPN3	St. Joseph	L 64-76	6–6	28 – Hansen	5 – Tied	3 – Haas	Alico Arena (1,946); Ft. Myers, FL
01/04/2014; 7:05 p.m., ESPN3	Stetson	W 72–56	7–6 (1–0)	20 – Knight	14 – Hansen	5 – Dunson	Alico Arena (1,786); Ft. Myers, FL
01/09/2014; 7:05 p.m., ESPN3	East Tennessee State	W 73–58	8–6 (2–0)	21 – Knight	6 – Tied	6 – Dunson	Alico Arena (1,877); Ft. Myers, FL
01/11/2014; 7:05 p.m., ESPN3	USC Upstate	W 72–45	9–6 (3–0)	12 – Tied	8 – Meador	4 – Dunson	Alico Arena (1,630); Ft. Myers, FL
01/16/2014; 7:00 p.m., ESPN3	at Kennesaw State	W 69–55	10–6 (4–0)	17 – Dunson	7 – Hansen	6 – Hansen	KSU Convocation Center (659); Kennesaw, GA
01/18/2014; 3:00 p.m.	at Mercer	W 69–57	11–6 (5–0)	18 – Knight	7 – Atwater	5 – Dunson	Hawkins Arena (784); Macon, GA
01/23/2014; 7:05 p.m., ESPN3	Jacksonville	W 56–49	12–6 (6–0)	20 – Knight	9 – Hansen	3 – Tied	Alico Arena (1,814); Ft. Myers, FL
01/25/2014; 7:05 p.m., ESPN3	North Florida	W 54–34	13–6 (7–0)	14 – Haas	6 – Hansen	4 – Dunson	Alico Arena (1,503); Ft. Myers, FL
01/30/2014; 7:00 p.m., ESPN3	at Lipscomb	W 85–67	14–6 (8–0)	18 – Hansen	6 – Tied	6 – Dunson	Allen Arena (235); Nashville, TN
02/01/2014; 7:00 p.m.	at Northern Kentucky	L 43-63	14–7 (8–1)	19 – Knight	6 – Dunson	2 – Tied	The Bank of Kentucky Center (1,211); Highland Heights, KY
02/06/2014; 7:00 p.m.	at East Tennessee State	W 70–45	15–7 (9–1)	14 – Cobb	9 – Hansen	5 – Dunson	ETSU/MSHA Athletic Center (486); Johnson City, TN
02/08/2014; 2:00 p.m., ESPN3	at USC Upstate	W 76–69	16–7 (10–1)	26 – Hansen	8 – Hansen	8 – Dunson	G.B. Hodge Center (345); Spartanburg, SC
02/13/2014; 7:05 p.m., ESPN3	Mercer	W 99–57	17–7 (11–1)	23 – Dunson	10 – Hansen	6 – Atwater	Alico Arena (1,561); Ft. Myers, FL
02/15/2014; 7:05 p.m., ESPN3	Kennesaw State	W 76–42	18–7 (12–1)	23 – Cobb	8 – Knight	7 – Dunson	Alico Arena (2,004); Ft. Myers, FL
02/20/2014; 5:00 p.m.	at Jacksonville	W 62–43	19–7 (13–1)	17 – Haas	10 – Hansen	4 – Tied	Jacksonville Veterans Memorial Arena (589); Jacksonville, FL
02/22/2014; 4:30 p.m.	at North Florida	W 80–54	20–7 (14–1)	17 – Hansen	5 – Tied	5 – Dunson	UNF Arena (382); Jacksonville, FL
02/27/2014; 7:05 p.m., ESPN3	Lipscomb	W 108–67	21–7 (15–1)	16 – Atwater	10 – Hansen	9 – Dunson	Alico Arena (1,549); Ft. Myers, FL
03/01/2014; 7:05 p.m., ESPN3	Northern Kentucky	W 67–53	22–7 (16–1)	17 – Knight	10 – Hansen	7 – Dunson	Alico Arena (1,795); Ft. Myers, FL
03/08/2014; 1:00 p.m.	at Stetson	W 74–73 ^{OT}	23–7 (17–1)	16 – Haas	10 – Knight	4 – Dunson	Edmunds Center (649); DeLand, FL
Atlantic Sun Tournament
03/11/2014; 7:00 pm, ESPN3	Lipscomb; Quarterfinals	W 92–53	24–7	18 – Hansen	8 – Meador	5 – Haas	Alico Arena (1,279); Ft. Myers, FL
03/15/2014; 1:00 pm, ESPN3	Mercer; Semifinals	W 64–47	25–7	22 – Cobb	7 – Tied	4 – Dunson	Alico Arena (1,684); Ft. Myers, FL
03/16/2014; 3:00 pm, CSS	Stetson; Championship game	W 72–70 ^{OT}	26–7	19 – Cobb	11 – Atwater	6 – Dunson	Alico Arena (1,821); Ft. Myers, FL
NCAA tournament
03/22/2014*; 11:00 am, ESPN2	vs. Oklahoma State; First round	L 60–61 ^{OT}	26–8	16 – Cobb	11 – Knight	4 – Tied	Mackey Arena; West Lafayette, Indiana
*Non-conference game. ^{#}Rankings from AP Poll. (#) Tournament seedings in parentheses. All times are in EST.
