= 2016–17 NJIT Highlanders women's basketball team =

Intercollegiate basketball season

2016–17 NJIT Highlanders women's basketball
- Conference: Atlantic Sun Conference
- Record: 11–19 (4–10 A-Sun)
- Head coach: Steve Lanpher (5th season)
- Assistant coaches: Bob Dubina; Liz Flooks; Rayven Johnson
- Home arena: Fleisher Center

2016–17 ASUN women's basketball standings
| | Conf. | | | | Overall |
| Team | W | | L | PCT | W | | L | PCT |
|---|---|---|---|---|---|---|---|---|
| Stetson | 13 | – | 1 | .929 | 26 | – | 7 | .788 |
| Florida Gulf Coast † | 12 | – | 2 | .857 | 26 | – | 9 | .743 |
| Jacksonville | 11 | – | 3 | .786 | 23 | – | 9 | .719 |
| Kennesaw State | 8 | – | 6 | .571 | 10 | – | 20 | .333 |
| NJIT | 4 | – | 10 | .286 | 11 | – | 19 | .367 |
| North Florida | 3 | – | 11 | .214 | 10 | – | 20 | .333 |
| Lipscomb | 3 | – | 11 | .214 | 6 | – | 24 | .200 |
| USC Upstate | 2 | – | 12 | .143 | 9 | – | 21 | .300 |
† 2017 ASUN Tournament winner As of March 18, 2017; Rankings from AP poll

The 2016–17 NJIT Highlanders women's basketball team represented New Jersey Institute of Technology during the 2016–17 NCAA Division I women's basketball season. The Highlanders, led by fifth-year head coach Steve Lanpher, played their home games at the Fleisher Center in Newark, New Jersey as second-year members of the Atlantic Sun Conference (A-Sun). They finished the season 11–19, 4–10 in A-Sun play, to finish in fifth place. They lost in the quarterfinals of the A-Sun tournament to Kennesaw State.

This was their last season playing at Fleisher Center as they moved in to the newly built Wellness and Events Center beginning in the 2017–18 season.

== Roster ==
2016–17 NJIT Highlanders women's basketball team
Players
Coaches

| Pos. | # | Name | Height | Year | Previous school | Hometown |
|---|---|---|---|---|---|---|
| G | 0 | Amber Morgan | 5 ft 5 in (1.65 m) | Fr | Lawrence North | Indianapolis, IN |
| G | 1 | Alana Dudley | 5 ft 9 in (1.75 m) | Sr | Whippany Park | Whippany, NJ |
| G | 3 | Tracey Brereton | 5 ft 9 in (1.75 m) | Fr | Matawan Regional | Aberdeen, NJ |
| G | 11 | Jordan Ireland | 5 ft 7 in (1.7 m) | So | Garnet Valley | Garnet Valley, PA |
| G/F | 12 | Taj Lewis | 5 ft 10 in (1.78 m) | Jr | Longmeadow; Roxbury CC | Springfield, MA |
| G | 13 | Kelly Guarino | 5 ft 9 in (1.75 m) | RS Fr | Albertus Magnus | Thiells, NY |
| G | 14 | Ruta Vetra | 6 ft 0 in (1.83 m) | Jr | Our Lady of Mercy Academy | Jūrmala, Latvia |
| G | 15 | Amarri Trueheart | 5 ft 3 in (1.6 m) | Fr | Cheltenham | Cheltenham, PA |
| G | 20 | Danielle Tunstall | 5 ft 11 in (1.8 m) | Fr | Life Center Academy | Willingboro, NJ |
| C | 21 | Maria Ruban | 6 ft 5 in (1.96 m) | RS Jr | Our Lady of Mercy Academy | Kyiv, Ukraine |
| G | 22 | Tatianna Torres | 5 ft 10 in (1.78 m) | RS So | Thomas A. Edison | Arlington, VA |
| G | 23 | Jillian Libby | 5 ft 11 in (1.8 m) | RS Fr | Cheverus | South Portland, ME |
| G | 24 | Camerin Spahn | 6 ft 0 in (1.83 m) | Sr | Freehold | Freehold Borough, NJ |
| G/F | 25 | Hakilah Hudson | 5 ft 9 in (1.75 m) | Fr | Henrico | Richmond, VA |
| F | 34 | Leah Horton | 6 ft 1 in (1.85 m) | RS Sr | Emmaus; Temple | Macungie, PA |

Head coach

- Steve Lanpher (St. Joseph)

Assistant coach(es)

- Bob Dubina (Monmouth)
- Liz Flooks (Niagara)
- Rayven Johnson (NJIT)

Legend

- (C) Team captain
- (S) Suspended
- (I) Ineligible
- (W) Walk-on
- Injured
- Current redshirt

Roster
Last update: October 27, 2024

== Schedule ==
| Date time, TV | Rank^{#} | Opponent^{#} | Result | Record | Site (attendance) city, state |
Non-conference regular season
| November 12, 2016*; 2:00 p.m., ESPN3 | | Wagner | W 68–45 | 1–0 | Fleisher Center (400); Newark, NJ |
| November 15, 2016*; 7:00 p.m., ESPN3 | | St. Joseph's (NY) | W 87–53 | 2–0 | Fleisher Center (300); Newark, NJ |
| November 17, 2016*; 6:00 p.m. | | at Bucknell | L 36–67 | 2–1 | Sojka Pavilion (445); Lewisburg, PA |
| November 21, 2016*; 6:00 p.m., ESPN3 | | Fairleigh Dickinson | L 61–66 | 2–2 | Fleisher Center (300); Newark, NJ |
| November 25, 2016*; 7:00 p.m. | | at Vermont; TD Bank Classic semifinals | L 42–64 | 2–3 | Patrick Gym (478); Burlington, VT |
| November 26, 2016*; 5:00 p.m. | | vs. LIU Brooklyn; TD Bank Classic 3rd-place game | W 50–48 | 3–3 | Patrick Gym; Burlington, VT |
| November 30, 2016*; 7:00 p.m. | | at Lehigh | L 52–84 | 3–4 | Stabler Arena (537); Bethlehem, PA |
| December 4, 2016*; 12:00 p.m. | | at Harvard | L 38–59 | 3–5 | Lavietes Pavilion (507); Cambridge, MA |
| December 6, 2016*; 7:00 p.m., ESPN3 | | Binghamton | L 44–68 | 3–6 | Fleisher Center; Newark, NJ |
| December 11, 2016*; 1:00 p.m. | | at Delaware State | W 57–43 | 4–6 | Memorial Hall (389); Dover, DE |
| December 13, 2016*; 7:00 p.m. | | at Saint Joseph's | L 36–75 | 4–7 | Hagan Arena (207); Philadelphia, PA |
| December 16, 2016*; 7:00 p.m., ESPN3 | | Howard | W 70–55 | 5–7 | Fleisher Center (277); Newark, NJ |
| December 28, 2016*; 7:00 p.m., ESPN3 | | Rutgers–Newark | W 83–52 | 6–7 | Fleisher Center (299); Newark, NJ |
| December 30, 2016*; 3:00 p.m. | | at Chicago State | W 57–42 | 7–7 | Jones Convocation Center (140); Chicago, IL |
| January 4, 2017*; 11:30 a.m., ESPN3 | | Columbia | L 51–65 | 7–8 | Fleisher Center (996); Newark, NJ |
Atlantic Sun regular season
| January 7, 2017; 4:30 p.m., ESPN3 | | at USC Upstate | L 58–75 | 7–9 (0–1) | G. B. Hodge Center (237); Spartanburg, SC |
| January 14, 2017; 1:00 p.m., ESPN3 | | North Florida | W 64–62 | 8–9 (1–1) | Fleisher Center (499); Newark, NJ |
| January 16, 2017; 7:00 p.m., ESPN3 | | Jacksonville | L 56–75 | 8–10 (1–2) | Fleisher Center (355); Newark, NJ |
| January 21, 2017; 4:00 p.m., ESPN3 | | at Florida Gulf Coast | L 53–73 | 8–11 (1–3) | Alico Arena (1,459); Fort Myers, FL |
| January 23, 2017; 7:00 p.m., ESPN3 | | at Stetson | L 43–77 | 8–12 (1–4) | Edmunds Center (498); DeLand, FL |
| January 28, 2017; 1:00 p.m., ESPN3 | | Lipscomb | W 76–68 | 9–12 (2–4) | Fleisher Center (300); Newark, NJ |
| February 2, 2017; 7:00 p.m., ESPN3 | | at Kennesaw State | L 64–75 | 9–13 (2–5) | KSU Convocation Center (355); Kennesaw, GA |
| February 4, 2017; 2:30 p.m., ESPN3 | | at Lipscomb | W 76–53 | 10–13 (3–5) | Allen Arena (560); Nashville, TN |
| February 8, 2017; 7:00 p.m., ESPN3 | | Kennesaw State | L 56–66 | 10–14 (3–6) | Fleisher Center (300); Newark, NJ |
| February 11, 2017; 1:00 p.m., ESPN3 | | at Jacksonville | L 59–75 | 10–15 (3–7) | Swisher Gymnasium (633); Jacksonville, FL |
| February 13, 2017; 7:00 p.m., ESPN3 | | at North Florida | L 51–61 | 10–16 (3–8) | UNF Arena (301); Jacksonville, FL |
| February 18, 2017; 1:00 p.m., ESPN3 | | Stetson | L 37–60 | 10–17 (3–9) | Fleisher Center (388); Newark, NJ |
| February 20, 2017; 7:00 p.m., ESPN3 | | Florida Gulf Coast | L 46–77 | 10–18 (3–10) | Fleisher Center (200); Newark, NJ |
| February 25, 2017; 1:00 p.m., ESPN3 | | USC Upstate | W 70–66 | 11–18 (4–10) | Fleisher Center; Newark, NJ |
Atlantic Sun women's tournament
| March 3, 2017; 7:00 p.m., ESPN3 | (4) | at (5) Kennesaw State; Quarterfinals | L 60–62 | 11–19 | KSU Convocation Center (983); Kennesaw, GA |
*Non-conference game. ^{#}Rankings from AP poll. (#) Tournament seedings in parentheses. All times are in Eastern.

== See also ==
- 2016–17 NJIT Highlanders men's basketball team
