= 2016–17 USC Upstate Spartans women's basketball team =

Intercollegiate basketball season

2016–17 USC Upstate Spartans women's basketball
- Conference: Atlantic Sun Conference
- Record: 9–21 (2–12 A-Sun)
- Head coach: Tammy George (12th season)
- Assistant coaches: Jason Rasnake; Johnette Walker; Tobias Pinson
- Home arena: G. B. Hodge Center

2016–17 ASUN women's basketball standings
	Conf.				Overall
Team	W		L	PCT	W		L	PCT
Stetson	13	–	1	.929	26	–	7	.788
Florida Gulf Coast †	12	–	2	.857	26	–	9	.743
Jacksonville	11	–	3	.786	23	–	9	.719
Kennesaw State	8	–	6	.571	10	–	20	.333
NJIT	4	–	10	.286	11	–	19	.367
North Florida	3	–	11	.214	10	–	20	.333
Lipscomb	3	–	11	.214	6	–	24	.200
USC Upstate	2	–	12	.143	9	–	21	.300
† 2017 ASUN Tournament winner As of March 18, 2017; Rankings from AP poll

The 2016–17 USC Upstate Spartans women's basketball team represented the University of South Carolina Upstate in the 2016–17 NCAA Division I women's basketball season. The Spartans, led by twelfth year head coach Tammy George, played their games at G. B. Hodge Center and were members of the Atlantic Sun Conference. They finished the season 9–21, 2–12 in A-Sun play to finish in last place. They lost in the quarterfinals of A-Sun Tournament to Stetson.

== Media ==
All home games and conference road will be shown on ESPN3 or A-Sun.TV. Non conference road games will typically be available on the opponents website.

== Roster ==
2016–17 USC Upstate Spartans women's basketball team
Players
Coaches

Pos.	#	Name	Height	Year	Previous school	Hometown
G	0	Brittney Delva	5 ft 6 in (1.68 m)	Jr	Amos P. Goby HS; South Georgia Tech College	Boynton Beach, FL
G	1	Tamera Thrope	5 ft 8 in (1.73 m)	So	Greensboro Day School	Greensboro, NC
G	3	Breanna Jefferson	5 ft 6 in (1.68 m)	Fr	Virginia Episcopal School	Lynchburg, VA
G	10	Rylie Parkhurst	5 ft 8 in (1.73 m)	Fr	Miamisburg HS	Miamisburg, OH
G	13	Raven Jefferson	5 ft 9 in (1.75 m)	Sr	Liberty Christian Academy	Lynchburg, VA
G	14	Vanessa Agrusa	5 ft 10 in (1.78 m)	So	Franklin HS	Franklin, NC
C	15	Coco Ritter	6 ft 2 in (1.88 m)	Jr	Orangeburg-Wilkerson HS	Orangeburg, SC
G	20	Bailey Wensler	5 ft 8 in (1.73 m)	So	Perkins-Tryon HS	Stillwater, OK
C	21	Riley Popplewell	5 ft 11 in (1.8 m)	Fr	South Central HS	Union Mills, IN
G	23	DeNisha Swain	5 ft 7 in (1.7 m)	So	Potter's House Christian Academy	Jacksonville, FL
C	24	A'Lexxus Davis	6 ft 1 in (1.85 m)	Jr	Potter's House Christian Academy	Jacksonville, FL
C	30	Morgan Williams	5 ft 9 in (1.75 m)	RS So	Dutch Fork HS; Coker College	Irmo, SC
G	35	Victoria Hadler	5 ft 11 in (1.8 m)	So	Deerfield HS	Deerfield Beach, FL

Head coach

- Tammy George (Charlotte)

Assistant coach(es)

- Jason Rasnake (NC State)
- Johnette Walker (Radford)
- Tobias Pinson (Winthrop)

Legend

- (C) Team captain
- (S) Suspended
- (I) Ineligible
- (W) Walk-on
- Injured
- Current redshirt

Roster

== Schedule ==
Date time, TV	Rank^{#}	Opponent^{#}	Result	Record	Site (attendance) city, state
Non-conference regular season
11/11/2016*; 8:30 pm, ESPN3		Converse	W 93–35	1–0	G. B. Hodge Center (615); Spartanburg, SC
11/14/2016*; 7:00 pm		at Presbyterian	W 55–48	2–0	Templeton Center (212); Clinton, SC
11/17/2016*; 7:00 pm		at Purdue	L 41–71	2–1	Mackey Arena (5,611); West Lafayette, IN
11/20/2016*; 1:00 pm		at Illinois	L 57–77	2–2	State Farm Center (1,133); Champaign, IL
11/22/2016*; 7:00 pm, ESPN3		William & Mary	L 46–49	2–3	G. B. Hodge Center (201); Spartanburg, SC
11/23/2016*; 7:00 pm, ESPN3		Warren Wilson	W 91–53	3–3	G. B. Hodge Center (210); Spartanburg, SC
11/26/2016*; 2:00 pm, ESPN3		Gardner–Webb	L 53–57	3–4	G. B. Hodge Center (228); Spartanburg, SC
11/30/2016*; 2:00 pm		at Furman	L 37–57	3–5	Timmons Arena (207); Greenville, SC
12/03/2016*; 1:00 pm, ESPN3		Bob Jones	W 92–50	4–5	G. B. Hodge Center (201); Spartanburg, SC
12/10/2016*; 6:30 pm		at No. 13 West Virginia	L 33–91	4–6	WVU Coliseum (1,435); Morgantown, WV
12/12/2016*; 7:00 pm		at South Carolina State	W 73–67 ^{OT}	5–6	SHM Memorial Center (107); Orangeburg, SC
12/15/2016*; 7:00 pm, ESPN3		Campbell	L 41–56	5–7	G. B. Hodge Center (235); Spartanburg, SC
12/17/2016*; 2:00 pm, ESPN3		UNC Asheville	L 59–70	5–8	G. B. Hodge Center (356); Spartanburg, SC
12/30/2016*; 5:00 pm, ESPN3		Maryland Eastern Shore	W 76–63	6–8	G. B. Hodge Center (271); Spartanburg, SC
01/03/2017*; 5:00 pm		at North Carolina Central	W 68–58	7–8	McLendon–McDougald Gymnasium (277); Durham, NC
Atlantic Sun regular season
01/07/2017; 4:30 pm, ESPN3		NJIT	W 75–58	8–8 (1–0)	G. B. Hodge Center (237); Spartanburg, SC
01/14/2017; 4:30 pm, ESPN3		Jacksonville	L 47–65	8–9 (1–1)	G. B. Hodge Center (325); Spartanburg, SC
01/16/2017; 7:00 pm, ESPN3		North Florida	L 67–78	8–10 (1–2)	G. B. Hodge Center (317); Spartanburg, SC
01/21/2017; 1:00 pm, ESPN3		at Stetson	L 68–80	8–11 (1–3)	Edmunds Center (588); DeLand, FL
01/23/2017; 7:00 pm, ESPN3		at Florida Gulf Coast	L 43–93	8–12 (1–4)	Alico Arena (1,821); Fort Myers, FL
01/28/2017; 4:30 pm, ESPN3		Kennesaw State	L 71–79 ^{OT}	8–13 (1–5)	G. B. Hodge Center (289); Spartanburg, SC
02/02/2017; 7:30 pm, ESPN3		at Lipscomb	L 77–84	8–14 (1–6)	Allen Arena (592); Nashville, TN
02/04/2017; 2:00 pm, ESPN3		at Kennesaw State	L 67–74	8–15 (1–7)	KSU Convocation Center (723); Kennesaw, GA
02/08/2017; 7:00 pm, ESPN3		Lipscomb	W 89–75	9–15 (2–7)	G. B. Hodge Center (402); Spartanburg, SC
02/11/2017; 1:00 pm, ESPN3		at North Florida	L 74–77 ^{3OT}	9–16 (2–8)	UNF Arena (336); Jacksonville, FL
02/13/2017; 4:30 pm, ESPN3		at Jacksonville	L 46–59	9–17 (2–9)	Swisher Gymnasium (301); Jacksonville, FL
02/18/2017; 4:30 pm, ESPN3		Florida Gulf Coast	L 50–80	9–18 (2–10)	G. B. Hodge Center (418); Spartanburg, SC
02/20/2017; 7:00 pm, ESPN3		Stetson	L 55–77	9–19 (2–11)	G. B. Hodge Center (328); Spartanburg, SC
02/25/2017; 1:00 pm, ESPN3		at NJIT	L 66–70	9–20 (2–12)	Fleisher Center; Newark, NJ
Atlantic Sun Women's Tournament
03/03/2017; 7:00 pm, ESPN3	(8)	at (1) Stetson; Quarterfinals	L 49–70	9–21	Edmunds Center (640); DeLand, FL
*Non-conference game. ^{#}Rankings from AP Poll. (#) Tournament seedings in parentheses. All times are in Eastern Time.

== See also ==
- 2016–17 USC Upstate Spartans men's basketball team
