= Florida Gulf Coast Eagles women's basketball =

2026–27 Florida Gulf Coast Eagles women's basketball team
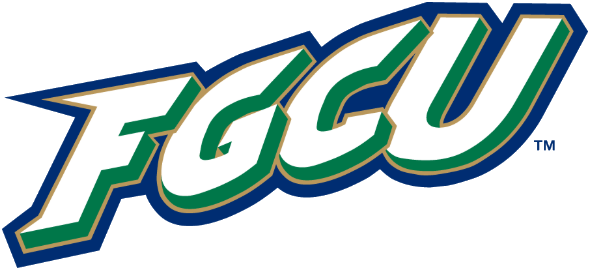
- University: Florida Gulf Coast University
- First season: 2002–03; 24 years ago
- Head coach: Raina Harmon (2nd season)
- Location: Fort Myers, Florida
- Arena: Alico Arena (capacity: 4,500)
- Conference: Atlantic Sun
- Nickname: Eagles
- Colors: Cobalt blue and emerald green

NCAA Division I tournament runner-up
- 2007*
Other NCAA Division I tournament results
Final Four	2007*
Elite Eight	2007*
Sweet Sixteen	2006*, 2007*
Appearances	2006*, 2007*, 2012, 2014, 2015, 2017, 2018, 2019, 2021, 2022, 2023, 2024, 2025

Conference tournament champions
- 2012, 2014, 2015, 2017, 2018, 2019, 2020†, 2021, 2022, 2023, 2024, 2025

Conference regular-season champions
- 2009**, 2011, 2012, 2013, 2014, 2015, 2016, 2018, 2019, 2020, 2021, 2022, 2023, 2024, 2025

Conference division champions
- 2022

Uniforms
Home	Away
- * at Division II level ** Not eligible for conference or NCAA tournament due to transition to Division I † Co-champions with Liberty University after conference tournament cancelled

The Florida Gulf Coast Eagles women's basketball team is the women's basketball team that represents Florida Gulf Coast University in Fort Myers, Florida, United States. The school's team currently competes in the Atlantic Sun Conference.

In 2002, Florida Gulf Coast became an independent member of NCAA Division II. Florida Gulf Coast also started its men's basketball team, with Dave Balza as head coach from the inaugural 2002–03 to the 2010–11 season. In 2006, Florida Gulf Coast applied for NCAA Division I status and became a transitory Division I effective in the 2007–08 season. Florida Gulf Coast became a full Division I member on August 11, 2011.

== History ==
The university charter was signed 1991, but students did not begin attending classes until 1997. The athletic programs began as members of the NAIA. The school hired Karl Smesko while the school was still in the NAIA, but his first year coincided with the transfer to NCAA Division II in 2002. In his first year, the basketball facilities were not yet completed at the beginning of the season, so players began individual workouts on outdoor courts. His first office was in a trailer. Despite having no experience as a team, the Eagles opened their season against Ohio Dominican and won. Then they won their next game, and the next, and continued winning until they faced St. Francis of Indiana, who beat the Eagles to give them their first loss. That would be the last loss of the season, as they went on to a thirty win season, with a 30–1 record.

The team continued to pile up winning records, and went on to post a 29–2 record in and earn an invitation to the DII post-season tournament in 2006. The team would advance as far as the Regional semi-final. After reaching a national DII ranking of eleven, the team faced ninth ranked Rollins, and won 48–46. The team then faced seventh ranked Delta State who ended the Eagles season with a 57–48 win.

FGCU then joined the Atlantic Sun Conference, although they would be provisional members until 2011. The finished in second place in the conference in both 2008, and 2010. The 2009 team did finish first in the conference during the regular season but due to the transition to Division I and the Atlantic Sun Conference, was not eligible for conference or NCAA Tournament play. The team earned invitations to the post-season WNIT tournament, advancing to the second round in 2008 and 2009. In 2011, the team would go 28–4 overall, with a 17–3 record in conference. That record was the best in conference, resulting in the first regular season conference title for the Eagles. The team would not become a full member of the conference until August of that year, so was not part of the conference post-season tournament. They did participate in the 2011 WNIT, beating Drexel in the first round before losing to Florida in the second round.

In 2012, their first year of eligibility for the Atlantic Sun post-season tournament, they went undefeated in conference play, with an 18–0 as part of an overall 29–3 record. They won the conference tournament, earning a bid to the NCAA tournament. They took on St. Bonaventure in their first NCAA game and took the Bonnies to overtime, before succumbing 72–65.

The following year, the team also went undefeated in regular season conference play, but ended up with a loss to Stetson in the conference championship game. Although the team had lost eight players from the year before, they had won all their conference games by double digits. They held a double-digit lead in the conference final, but then went on a long scoreless streak, allowing the Hatters to get back into the game and win, 70–64. The Eagles earned an invitation to the WNIT but lost in the first round.

=== 2012 Paradise Jam ===
FGCU participated at the Paradise Jam in St. Thomas. The four teams invited to the Reef Division of tournament were:

- DePaul University
- Florida Gulf Coast University
- Hampton University
- University of South Carolina

The teams played in a round-robin format over the Thanksgiving weekend. In their game against DePaul, the Eagles fell behind early, down as much as 12 points in the first half. They came back to cut the deficit to a single point at halftime. After taking a brief, one-point lead early in the second half, the Blue Demons took back the lead, and extended it to nine points with under eight minutes to go. The lead was still eight points with just over two minutes left, when Taylor Gradinjan was fouled on a three-point attempt, and hit all three free throws. Katie Meador hit a basket with 23 seconds remaining, and Sarah Hansen scored with eight seconds left, but DePaul held on for a two-point victory.

=== 2013 Academic award ===
In the 2012–13 season, the team achieved a GPA of 3.621, which was high enough to be in fourth place among Division I teams, and earned a position on the WBCA Academic honor roll.

== Coaching staff ==
The head coach, Karl Smesko, became the head coach at FGCU after previous coaching experience at Walsh University, Maryland, and IPFW. He was the first head coach of the women's basketball program at FGCU. He has many awards, including the Kay Yow Award in 2012. Smesko is a 1993 graduate of Kent State, with a 1998 Master's degree from Walsh University.

Abby Scharlow has been an assistant coach since 2010. She played at Wisconsin–Green Bay during her college years, and professionally with Team Catz in Finland and the San Diego Siege of the National Women's Basketball League. She began her coaching career as an assistant at Valparaiso University. Chelsea Dermyer is an assistant coach who has been with the program since 2005. She played for two seasons, helping the team win a WNIT bid. She has both a bachelors and a master's degree from FGCU.

Chelsea Lyles is also an assistant coach with playing experience with the Eagles. A two-sport athlete, she played basketball only as a freshman at Western Nebraska Community College, but played volleyball as a sophomore, earning first-team all-region honors. She was spotted by an FGCU assistant coach while playing at the JUCO nationals, who helped recruit her to FGCU. She played basketball for FGCU, then played volleyball as a fifth year senior. Lyles accepted an assistant coaching position at FGCU in 2011.

Mel Thomas served as the Director of Basketball Operations, between 2010 and 2014. Thomas had a four-year playing career for the Connecticut Huskies. Thomas was one of the best three-point shooters in UConn history. During her senior year, she suffered a career ending ACL injury. While recuperating from her injury, she kept an extensive journal, and turned it into a book Heart Of A Husky (ISBN 1578604419)

On November 13, 2024, Karl Smesko resigned as the head coach at FGCU to become the head coach with the WNBA's Atlanta Dream. Longtime assistant coach Chelsea Lyles was named as the second head coach in program history.

== Season results ==
Record table
Season	Team	Overall	Conference	Standing	Postseason
Karl Smesko (Independent, A-Sun) (2003–2024)
2002–03	Karl Smesko	30–1			
2003–04	Karl Smesko	18–8			
2004–05	Karl Smesko	21–9			
2005–06	Karl Smesko	29–2			NCAA DII Regional semifinal
2006–07	Karl Smesko	34–1			NCAA DII Runner-up
Atlantic Sun Conference
2007–08	Karl Smesko	22–9	12–3	2nd	WNIT second round
2008–09	Karl Smesko	26–5	17–3	2nd	WNIT second round
2009–10	Karl Smesko	24–7	17–3	2nd	WNIT first round
2010–11	Karl Smesko	28–4	17–3	1st	WNIT second round
2011–12	Karl Smesko	29–3	18–0	1st	NCAA first round
2012–13	Karl Smesko	27–7	18–0	1st	WNIT first round
2013–14	Karl Smesko	26–8	17–1	1st	NCAA First round
2014–15	Karl Smesko	31–3	14–0	1st	NCAA Second round
2015–16	Karl Smesko	33–6	14–0	1st	WNIT Runner-up
2016–17	Karl Smesko	26–9	12–2	2nd	NCAA first round
2017–18	Karl Smesko	30–4	13–1	1st	NCAA second round
2018–19	Karl Smesko	28–5	16–0	1st	NCAA first round
2019–20	Karl Smesko	30–3	15–1	1st	Canceled due to COVID-19 pandemic
2020–21	Karl Smesko	26–3	16–0	1st	NCAA first round
2021–22	Karl Smesko	30–3	15–1	1st	NCAA second round
2022–23	Karl Smesko	33–4	17–1	1st	NCAA second round
2023–24	Karl Smesko	29–5	16–0	1st	NCAA first round
2024–25	Karl Smesko	0–2	0–0		Left for Atlanta Dream HC Position
Karl Smesko:		611–112 (.845)	264–19 (.933)		
Chelsea Lyles (Atlantic Sun Conference) (2024–2025)
2024–25	Chelsea Lyles	29–1	18–0	1st	
Chelsea Lyles:		29–1 (.967)	18–0 (1.000)		
Total:		640–113 (.850)			
National champion Postseason invitational champion Conference regular season champion Conference regular season and conference tournament champion Division regular season champion Division regular season and conference tournament champion Conference tournament champion

== Postseason ==
=== NCAA Division I Tournament results ===
The Eagles have made eleven appearances in the NCAA Division I women's basketball tournament. They have a combined record of 4–11.

Year	Seed	Round	Opponent	Result
2012	(12)	First Round	(5) St. Bonaventure	L 65–72 (OT)
2014	(12)	First Round	(5) Oklahoma State	L 60–61 (OT)
2015	(7)	First Round; Second Round	(10) Oklahoma State (2) Florida State	W 75–67; L 47–65
2017	(13)	First Round	(4) Miami (FL)	L 60–62
2018	(12)	First Round; Second Round	(5) Missouri (4) Stanford	W 80–70; L 70–90
2019	(13)	First Round	(4) Miami (FL)	L 62–69
2021	(11)	First Round	(6) Michigan	L 66–87
2022	(12)	First Round; Second Round	(5) Virginia Tech (4) Maryland	W 84–81; L 65–89
2023	(12)	First Round; Second Round	(5) Washington State (4) Villanova	W 74–63; L 57–76
2024	(12)	First Round	(5) Oklahoma	L 70–73
2025	(14)	First Round	(3) Oklahoma	L 58–81

=== NCAA Division II tournament results ===
The Eagles made two appearances in the NCAA Division II women's basketball tournament. They had a combined record of 6–2.

Year	Round	Opponent	Result
2006	First round Second Round	Rollins; Delta State	W 48–46 (OT); L 48–57
2007	First round Second Round; Third round Elite Eight; Final Four; National Championship	Benedict; Valdosta State; Delta State; North Dakota; Clayton State; Southern Connecticut	W 78–49; W 57–44; W 57–44; W 83–64; W 61–57; L 45–61

== Awards and honors ==
- 2013—4th place NCAA Division I academic honor roll
