= 2017 ACC women's basketball tournament =

- Classification: Division I
- Season: 2016–17
- Teams: 15
- Site: HTC Center; Conway, South Carolina
- Champions: Notre Dame (4th title)
- Winning coach: Muffet McGraw (4th title)
- MVP: Lindsay Allen (Notre Dame)
- Attendance: 30,117
- Television: ESPN, ESPNU, ACCRSN

2016–17 ACC women's basketball standings
	Conf.				Overall
Team	W		L	PCT	W		L	PCT
No. 2 Notre Dame^{†}	15	–	1	.938	33	–	4	.892
No. 9 Duke	13	–	3	.813	28	–	6	.824
No. 10 Florida State	13	–	3	.813	28	–	7	.800
No. 13 Louisville	12	–	4	.750	29	–	8	.784
No. 17 NC State	12	–	4	.750	23	–	9	.719
No. 21 Syracuse	11	–	5	.688	22	–	11	.667
No. 16 Miami (FL)	10	–	6	.625	24	–	9	.727
Virginia	7	–	9	.438	20	–	13	.606
Wake Forest	6	–	10	.375	16	–	16	.500
Georgia Tech	5	–	11	.313	22	–	14	.611
Virginia Tech	4	–	12	.250	20	–	14	.588
Pittsburgh	4	–	12	.250	13	–	17	.433
Clemson	3	–	13	.188	15	–	16	.484
North Carolina	3	–	13	.188	15	–	16	.484
Boston College	2	–	14	.125	9	–	21	.300
† 2017 ACC tournament winner As of March 29, 2017; Rankings from AP poll

The 2017 Atlantic Coast Conference women's basketball tournament was a postseason women's basketball tournament for the Atlantic Coast Conference was held March 1 to 5 in Conway, South Carolina, at the HTC Center. It was originally scheduled to be played in Greensboro, North Carolina, but was moved due to HB2 law. Notre Dame won their 4th straight ACC tournament title to earn an automatic trip to the NCAA women's tournament.

== Seeding ==
Tournament seeds are determined by teams' regular season conference record with tiebreakers determined by ACC tiebreaking rules.

2017 ACC women's basketball tournament seeds and results
Seed	School	Conf.	Over.	Tiebreaker
1	Notre Dame	15–1	27–3	
2	Florida State	13–3	25–5	1–0 vs. Duke
3	Duke	13–3	25–4	0–1 vs. Florida State
4	NC State	12–4	22–7	1–0 vs. Louisville
5	Louisville	12–4	25–6	0–1 vs. NC State
6	Syracuse	11–5	20–9	
7	Miami	10–6	21–7	
8	Virginia	7–9	18–11	
9	Wake Forest	6–10	15–14	
10	Georgia Tech	5–11	16–13	
11	Pittsburgh	4–12	13–16	1–0 vs. Virginia Tech
12	Virginia Tech	4–12	17–12	0–1 vs. Pittsburgh
13	Clemson	3–13	14–15	1–0 vs. North Carolina
14	North Carolina	3–13	14–15	0–1 vs. Clemson
15	Boston College	2–14	9–20	
‡ – ACC regular season champions, and tournament No. 1 seed. † – Received a double-bye in the conference tournament. # – Received a single-bye in the conference tournament. Overall records include all games played in the ACC Tournament.

== Schedule ==
Session	Game	Time*	Matchup^{#}	Television	Attendance
First round – Wednesday, March 1
1	1	1:00 pm	#13 Clemson vs #12 Virginia Tech	ACCRSN	2,769
1	2	3:30 pm	#15 Boston College vs #10 Georgia Tech	ACCRSN	2,769
1	3	6:30 pm	#14 North Carolina vs #11 Pittsburgh	ACCRSN	2,475
Second round – Thursday, March 2
2	4	11:00 am	#13 Clemson vs #5 Louisville	ACC Network; FSN	2,613
2	5	2:00 pm	#9 Wake Forest vs #8 Virginia	ACC Network; FSN	2,466
3	6	6:00 pm	#10 Georgia Tech vs #7 Miami	ACC Network; FSN	3,145
3	7	8:00 pm	#14 North Carolina vs #6 Syracuse	ACC Network; FSN	3,145
Quarterfinals – Friday, March 3
4	8	11:00 am	#5 Louisville vs #4 NC State	ACCRSN	3,004
4	9	2:00 pm	#8 Virginia vs #1 Notre Dame	ACCRSN	2,845
5	10	6:00 pm	#7 Miami vs #2 Florida State	ACCRSN	3,600
5	11	8:00 pm	#6 Syracuse vs #3 Duke	ACCRSN	3,600
Semifinals – Saturday, March 4
6	12	12:00 pm	#5 Louisville vs #1 Notre Dame	ESPN2	3,600
6	13	2:30 pm	#7 Miami vs. #3 Duke	ESPNU	3,600
Championship Game – Sunday, March 5
7	14	1:00 pm	#1 Notre Dame vs #3 Duke	ESPN2	3,600
*Game Times in ET. #-Rankings denote tournament seed

== Bracket ==
First round Wednesday, March 1 ACCRSN
12	Virginia Tech	66
13	Clemson	67
10	Georgia Tech	71
15	Boston College	67
11	Pittsburgh	60
14	North Carolina	72

Second round Thursday, March 2 ACCRSN
8	Virginia	61
9	Wake Forest	44
5	Louisville	68
13	Clemson	46
7	Miami	87
10	Georgia Tech	71
6	Syracuse	83
14	North Carolina	64

Quarterfinals; Friday, March 3 ACCRSN
1	Notre Dame	76
8	Virginia	59
4	NC State	58
5	Louisville	59
2	Florida State	54
7	Miami	56
3	Duke	68
6	Syracuse	46

Semifinals; Saturday, March 4 ESPNU
1	Notre Dame	84
5	Louisville	73
7	Miami	52
3	Duke	57

Championship game Sunday, March 5 ESPN2
1	Notre Dame	84
3	Duke	61

== See also ==
- 2017 ACC men's basketball tournament
