= 2016–17 North Carolina Tar Heels women's basketball team =

Intercollegiate basketball season

2016–17 North Carolina Tar Heels women's basketball
- Conference: Atlantic Coast Conference
- Record: 15–16 (3–13 ACC)
- Head coach: Sylvia Hatchell (31st season)
- Assistant coaches: Andrew Calder; Tracey Williams-Johnson; Sylvia Crawley
- Home arena: Carmichael Arena

2016–17 ACC women's basketball standings
	Conf.				Overall
Team	W		L	PCT	W		L	PCT
No. 2 Notre Dame^{†}	15	–	1	.938	33	–	4	.892
No. 9 Duke	13	–	3	.813	28	–	6	.824
No. 10 Florida State	13	–	3	.813	28	–	7	.800
No. 13 Louisville	12	–	4	.750	29	–	8	.784
No. 17 NC State	12	–	4	.750	23	–	9	.719
No. 21 Syracuse	11	–	5	.688	22	–	11	.667
No. 16 Miami (FL)	10	–	6	.625	24	–	9	.727
Virginia	7	–	9	.438	20	–	13	.606
Wake Forest	6	–	10	.375	16	–	16	.500
Georgia Tech	5	–	11	.313	22	–	14	.611
Virginia Tech	4	–	12	.250	20	–	14	.588
Pittsburgh	4	–	12	.250	13	–	17	.433
Clemson	3	–	13	.188	15	–	16	.484
North Carolina	3	–	13	.188	15	–	16	.484
Boston College	2	–	14	.125	9	–	21	.300
† 2017 ACC tournament winner As of March 29, 2017; Rankings from AP poll

The 2016–17 North Carolina Tar Heels women's basketball team represented the University of North Carolina at Chapel Hill during the 2016–17 NCAA Division I women's basketball season. The Tar Heels, led by thirty-first-year head coach Sylvia Hatchell, played their games at Carmichael Arena and were members of the Atlantic Coast Conference. They finished the season 15–16, 3–13 in ACC play to finish in a tie for thirteenth place. They advanced to the second round of ACC women's tournament, where they lost to Syracuse.

== Roster ==
2016–17 North Carolina Tar Heels women's basketball team
Players
Coaches

Pos.	#	Name	Height	Year	Previous school	Hometown
G	1	Taylor Koenen	6 ft 2 in (1.88 m)	Fr	Shakopee	Savage, MN
G	2	Ali Cyr-Scully	5 ft 5 in (1.65 m)	Fr	East Chapel Hill	Chapel Hill, NC
G	4	Jocelyn Jones	6 ft 0 in (1.83 m)	Fr	Cosby	Richmond, VA
G	5	Stephanie Watts	5 ft 11 in (1.8 m)	So	Weddington	Wesley Chapel, NC
G	10	Jamie Cherry	5 ft 8 in (1.73 m)	Jr	West Craven	Cove City, NC
F	11	Emily Sullivan	6 ft 4 in (1.93 m)	Fr	Reitz Memorial	Newburgh, IN
F	13	Hillary Fuller	6 ft 2 in (1.88 m)	RS Sr	The Potter's House	Jacksonville, FL
G	14	Liz Roberts (W)	5 ft 8 in (1.73 m)	Fr	Durham Academy	Chapel Hill, NC
G	15	Olivia Smith	6 ft 0 in (1.83 m)	Fr	Cardinal Gibbons	Raleigh, NC
F	21	Alyssa Okoene	6 ft 3 in (1.91 m)	Fr	North Shore	Houston, TX
G	22	Paris Kea	5 ft 9 in (1.75 m)	RS So	Page; Vanderbilt	Greenboro, NC
G	24	Destinee Walker	5 ft 10 in (1.78 m)	So	Lake Highland Prep	Ocoee, FL
F	30	Hillary Summers	6 ft 2 in (1.88 m)	RS Sr	Village Christian Academy	Fayetteville, NC
C	34	Naomi Van Nes	6 ft 6 in (1.98 m)	Fr	Hamden Country Day	Dorchester, England

Head coach

- Sylvia Hatchell (Carson-Newman)

Assistant coach(es)

- Andrew Calder (Coker)
- Tracey Williams-Johnson (UNC Pembroke)
- Sylvia Crawley (North Carolina)

Legend

- (C) Team captain
- (S) Suspended
- (I) Ineligible
- (W) Walk-on
- Injured
- Current redshirt

Roster

== Schedule ==
Date time, TV	Rank^{#}	Opponent^{#}	Result	Record	Site (attendance) city, state
Exhibition
11/02/2016*; 6:00 pm, ACCN Extra		Carson–Newman	W 96–70		Carmichael Arena; Chapel Hill, NC
11/07/2016*; 6:00 pm		Elizabeth City State	W 115–51		Carmichael Arena; Chapel Hill, NC
Non-conference regular season
11/11/2016*; 4:00 pm, ACCN Extra		Alabama State	W 84–54	1–0	Carmichael Arena (2,162); Chapel Hill, NC
11/17/2016*; 6:00 pm, ACCN Extra		Alabama A&M	W 80–35	2–0	Carmichael Arena (2,107); Chapel Hill, NC
11/20/2016*; 6:00 pm, ACCN Extra		Bucknell	W 65–50	3–0	Carmichael Arena (2,498); Chapel Hill, NC
11/22/2016*; 3:00 pm, ACCN Extra		Charleston Southern	W 93–77	4–0	Carmichael Arena (1,877); Chapel Hill, NC
11/24/2016*; 4:15 pm		vs. South Florida; Junkanoo Jam Lucaya Division semifinals	L 55–83	4–1	St. George HS Gymnasium; Freeport, BAH
11/25/2016*; 5:45 pm		vs. Minnesota; Junkanoo Jam Lucaya Division 3rd place game	W 91–77	5–1	St. George HS Gymnasium (486); Freeport, BAH
12/01/2016*; 8:00 pm		at Wisconsin; ACC–Big Ten Women's Challenge	W 72–59	6–1	Kohl Center (2,972); Madison, WI
12/04/2016*; 5:30 pm, ACCN Extra		Elon	W 78–73	7–1	Carmichael Arena (2,791); Chapel Hill, NC
12/07/2016*; 5:30 pm, ACCN Extra		Marshall	W 75–53	8–1	Carmichael Arena (1,528); Chapel Hill, NC
12/18/2016*; 3:00 pm, ASN		vs. LSU; Crescom Bank Holiday Invitational	L 43–70	8–2	Myrtle Beach Convention Center (1,452); Myrtle Beach, SC
12/20/2016*; 7:00 pm		vs. Jacksonville; Crescom Bank Holiday Invitational	W 87–57	9–2	Myrtle Beach Convention Center (1,121); Myrtle Beach, SC
12/28/2016*; 2:00 pm, ACCN Extra		Coppin State	W 90–55	10–2	Carmichael Arena (1,977); Chapel Hill, NC
12/30/2016*; 2:00 pm, ACCN Extra		South Carolina State	W 82–49	11–2	Carmichael Arena (1,949); Chapel Hill, NC
ACC regular season
01/02/2016; 7:00 pm, ACCN Extra		at Virginia Tech	L 68–76	11–3 (0–1)	Cassell Coliseum (2,170); Blacksburg, VA
01/05/2016; 7:00 pm, ACCN Extra		No. 6 Florida State	L 77–90	11–4 (0–2)	Carmichael Arena (1,528); Chapel Hill, NC
01/08/2016; 1:00 pm, ACCN Extra		Virginia	W 67–58	12–4 (1–2)	Carmichael Arena (505); Chapel Hill, NC
01/12/2016; 7:00 pm, ACCN Extra		at No. 12 Duke	L 58–70	12–5 (1–3)	Cameron Indoor Stadium (6,718); Durham, NC
01/15/2016; 2:00 pm		at Pittsburgh	L 48–68	12–6 (1–4)	Petersen Events Center (1,879); Pittsburgh, PA
01/19/2016; 7:00 pm, RSN		Wake Forest	L 77–80	12–7 (1–5)	Carmichael Arena (1,476); Chapel Hill, NC
01/22/2016; 12:00 pm, ESPNU		No. 6 Notre Dame	L 55–77	12–8 (1–6)	Carmichael Arena (3,159); Chapel Hill, NC
01/26/2016; 7:00 pm, RSN		at No. 17 Miami (FL)	L 88–100	12–9 (1–7)	Watsco Center (1,076); Coral Gables, FL
01/29/2016; 3:00 pm, RSN		No. 18 NC State; Carolina–State Game	W 83–70	13–9 (2–7)	Carmichael Arena (5,998); Chapel Hill, NC
02/05/2016; 2:00 pm, ACCN Extra		at Clemson	L 67–78	13–10 (2–8)	Littlejohn Coliseum (668); Clemson, SC
02/09/2016; 5:30 pm, ACCN Extra		Boston College	L 77–88	13–11 (2–9)	Carmichael Arena (1,506); Chapel Hill, NC
02/12/2016; 3:00 pm, RSN		at No. 20 Syracuse	L 64–95	13–12 (2–10)	Carrier Dome (1,595); Syracuse, NY
02/16/2016; 7:00 pm, ACCN Extra		Georgia Tech	W 89–88	14–12 (3–10)	Carmichael Arena (1,909); Chapel Hill, NC
02/19/2016; 12:00 pm, ESPNU		at No. 14 Louisville	L 57–87	14–13 (3–11)	KFC Yum! Center (9,739); Louisville, KY
02/23/2016; 7:00 pm, RSN		at No. 18 NC State; Carolina–State Game	L 60–80	14–14 (3–12)	Reynolds Coliseum (4,877); Raleigh, NC
02/26/2016; 3:00 pm, RSN		No. 13 Duke	L 71–95	14–15 (3–13)	Carmichael Arena (4,221); Chapel Hill, NC
ACC Women's Tournament
03/01/2017; 6:30 pm, RSN	(14)	vs. (11) Pittsburgh; First Round	W 72–60	15–15	HTC Center (2,475); Conway, SC
03/02/2017; 8:00 pm, RSN	(14)	vs. (6) No. 21 Syracuse; Second Round	L 64–83	15–16	HTC Center (3,145); Conway, SC
*Non-conference game. ^{#}Rankings from AP Poll. (#) Tournament seedings in parentheses. All times are in Eastern.

== Rankings ==
Regular season polls
Poll	Pre- season	Week 2	Week 3	Week 4	Week 5	Week 6	Week 7	Week 8	Week 9	Week 10	Week 11	Week 12	Week 13	Week 14	Week 15	Week 16	Week 17	Week 18	Week 19	Final
AP	NR																			N/A
Coaches	NR																			

Legend
	Increase in ranking
	Decrease in ranking
	Not ranked previous week
(RV)	Received votes

== See also ==
- 2016–17 North Carolina Tar Heels men's basketball team
