= 2016–17 Miami Hurricanes women's basketball team =

Intercollegiate basketball season

2016–17 Miami Hurricanes women's basketball

Miami Thanksgiving Tournament Champions

NCAA Women's Tournament, second round
- Conference: Atlantic Coast Conference

Ranking
- Coaches: No. 19
- AP: No. 16
- Record: 24–9 (10–6 ACC)
- Head coach: Katie Meier (12th season)
- Assistant coaches: Octavia Blue; Tia Jackson; Fitzroy Anthony
- Home arena: Watsco Center

2016–17 ACC women's basketball standings
| | Conf. | | | | Overall |
| Team | W | | L | PCT | W | | L | PCT |
|---|---|---|---|---|---|---|---|---|
| No. 2 Notre Dame^{†} | 15 | – | 1 | .938 | 33 | – | 4 | .892 |
| No. 9 Duke | 13 | – | 3 | .813 | 28 | – | 6 | .824 |
| No. 10 Florida State | 13 | – | 3 | .813 | 28 | – | 7 | .800 |
| No. 13 Louisville | 12 | – | 4 | .750 | 29 | – | 8 | .784 |
| No. 17 NC State | 12 | – | 4 | .750 | 23 | – | 9 | .719 |
| No. 21 Syracuse | 11 | – | 5 | .688 | 22 | – | 11 | .667 |
| No. 16 Miami (FL) | 10 | – | 6 | .625 | 24 | – | 9 | .727 |
| Virginia | 7 | – | 9 | .438 | 20 | – | 13 | .606 |
| Wake Forest | 6 | – | 10 | .375 | 16 | – | 16 | .500 |
| Georgia Tech | 5 | – | 11 | .313 | 22 | – | 14 | .611 |
| Virginia Tech | 4 | – | 12 | .250 | 20 | – | 14 | .588 |
| Pittsburgh | 4 | – | 12 | .250 | 13 | – | 17 | .433 |
| Clemson | 3 | – | 13 | .188 | 15 | – | 16 | .484 |
| North Carolina | 3 | – | 13 | .188 | 15 | – | 16 | .484 |
| Boston College | 2 | – | 14 | .125 | 9 | – | 21 | .300 |
† 2017 ACC tournament winner As of March 29, 2017; Rankings from AP poll

The 2016–17 Miami hurricanes women's basketball team represented the University of Miami during the 2016–17 NCAA Division I women's basketball season. The Hurricanes, led by twelfth-year head coach Katie Meier, played their home games at the Watsco Center and were members of the Atlantic Coast Conference. They finished the season 24–9, 10–6 in ACC play to finish in sixth place. They advanced to the semifinals of the ACC women's tournament, where they lost to Duke. They received an at-large bid to the NCAA women's tournament, where they defeated Florida Gulf Coast in the first round before being upset by Quinnipiac in the second round.

== Roster ==
2016–17 Miami Hurricanes women's basketball team
Players
Coaches

| Pos. | # | Name | Height | Year | Previous school | Hometown |
|---|---|---|---|---|---|---|
| F | 0 | Keyanna Harris | 6 ft 0 in (1.83 m) | Jr | William T. Dwyer | Palm Beach Gardens, FL |
| G | 1 | Laura Cornelius | 5 ft 8 in (1.73 m) | So | Caland Lyceum | Groningen, Netherlands |
| G | 3 | Jessica Thomas | 5 ft 6 in (1.68 m) | Sr | Buchholz | Gainesville, FL |
| G | 4 | Shaneese Bailey | 5 ft 9 in (1.75 m) | RS Jr | University Christian School; Florida Atlantic | Callahan, FL |
| G | 5 | Nigia Greene | 5 ft 10 in (1.78 m) | RS Jr | St. Francis | Atlanta, GA |
| G | 15 | Neydja Petithomme (I) (redshirt) | 5 ft 8 in (1.73 m) | Jr | Grandview Prep; Auburn | Boca Raton, FL |
| F | 20 | Keyona Hayes | 6 ft 1 in (1.85 m) | RS Sr | St. Francis | Marietta, GA |
| F | 21 | Emese Hof | 6 ft 3 in (1.91 m) | So | Caland Lyceum | Utrecht, Netherlands |
| F/C | 22 | Zada Williams | 6 ft 2 in (1.88 m) | So | Lake Wales | Babson Park, FL |
| G | 23 | Adrienne Motley | 5 ft 9 in (1.75 m) | Sr | Woodside | Newport News, VA |
| F | 25 | Khaila Prather | 6 ft 1 in (1.85 m) | Jr | Riverdale Baptist | Baltimore, MD |
| F | 30 | Erykah Davenport | 6 ft 2 in (1.88 m) | Jr | Tucker | Tucker, GA |

Head coach

- Katie Meier (Duke)

Assistant coach(es)

- Octavia Blue (Miami (FL))
- Tia Jackson (Iowa)
- Fitzroy Anthony (Palm Beach Atlantic)

Legend

- (C) Team captain
- (S) Suspended
- (I) Ineligible
- (W) Walk-on
- Injured
- Current redshirt

Roster

== Media ==
All home games and conference road games will be broadcast on WVUM as part of the Miami Hurricanes Learfield Sports contract.

== Schedule ==
| Date time, TV | Rank^{#} | Opponent^{#} | Result | Record | Site (attendance) city, state |
Non-conference regular season
| Nov 11, 2016*; 7:00 pm | No. 14 | at No. 19 Kentucky; Kentucky Classic | L 66–82 | 0–1 | Memorial Coliseum (4,471); Lexington, KY |
| Nov 13, 2016*; 7:00 pm | No. 14 | vs. Albany; Kentucky Classic | W 77–53 | 1–1 | Memorial Coliseum (150); Lexington, KY |
| Nov 16, 2016*; 7:00 pm, ACCN Extra | No. 22 | Charlotte | W 80–46 | 2–1 | Watsco Center (582); Coral Gables, FL |
| Nov 20, 2016*; 7:00 pm, ESPN3 | No. 22 | at St. John's | W 62–50 | 3–1 | Carnesecca Arena (695); Queens, NY |
| Nov 25, 2016*; 4:00 pm | No. 21 | Grambling State; Miami Thanksgiving Tournament | W 89–61 | 4–1 | Watsco Center (725); Coral Gables, FL |
| Nov 27, 2016*; 12:00 pm, ACCN Extra | No. 21 | Texas Tech; Miami Thanksgiving Tournament | W 74–56 | 5–1 | Watsco Center (722); Coral Gables, FL |
| Dec 1, 2016*; 7:00 pm, BTN | No. 18 | at No. 9 Ohio State; ACC–Big Ten Women's Challenge | W 94–89 ^{OT} | 6–1 | Value City Arena (4,165); Columbus, OH |
| Dec 4, 2016*; 2:00 pm, ACCN Extra | No. 18 | Old Dominion | W 66–56 | 7–1 | Watsco Center (537); Coral Gables, FL |
| Dec 6, 2016*; 11:00 am, ACCN Extra | No. 14 | Loyola–Chicago | W 81–43 | 8–1 | Watsco Center (4,989); Coral Gables, FL |
| Dec 16, 2016*; 7:00 pm | No. 13 | at FIU | W 69–49 | 9–1 | FIU Arena (470); Miami, FL |
| Dec 19, 2016*; 5:00 pm, ACCN Extra | No. 11 | Coppin State; Miami Holiday Tournament | W 75–35 | 10–1 | Watsco Center (601); Coral Gables, FL |
| Dec 20, 2016*; 5:00 pm, ACCN Extra | No. 11 | Maine; Miami Holiday Tournament | W 76–51 | 11–1 | Watsco Center (624); Coral Gables, FL |
ACC regular season
| Dec 29, 2016; 7:00 pm, ACCN Extra | No. 11 | No. 7 Florida State | L 66–81 | 11–2 (0–1) | Watsco Center (1,780); Coral Gables, FL |
| Jan 2, 2017; 7:00 pm | No. 14 | at Pittsburgh | W 82–50 | 12–2 (1–1) | Petersen Events Center (904); Pittsburgh, PA |
| Jan 5, 2017; 7:00 pm, ACCN Extra | No. 14 | at NC State | W 67–64 | 13–2 (2–1) | Reynolds Coliseum (2,574); Raleigh, NC |
| Jan 8, 2017; 7:00 pm, ESPN2 | No. 14 | No. 7 Notre Dame | L 55–67 | 13–3 (2–2) | Watsco Center (1,546); Coral Gables, FL |
| Jan 11, 2017; 7:00 pm, ACCN Extra | No. 14 | No. 15 Virginia Tech | W 82–75 | 14–3 (3–2) | Watsco Center (685); Coral Gables, FL |
| Jan 15, 2017; 1:30 pm, ESPN2 | No. 14 | at No. 9 Louisville | L 59–63 | 14–4 (3–3) | KFC Yum! Center (10,016); Louisville, KY |
| Jan 22, 2017; 2:30 pm, RSN | No. 14 | at Syracuse | L 48–81 | 14–5 (3–4) | Carrier Dome (1,900); Syracuse, NY |
| Jan 26, 2017; 7:00 pm, RSN | No. 17 | North Carolina | W 100–88 | 15–5 (4–4) | Watsco Center (1,076); Coral Gables, FL |
| Jan 29, 2017; 1:00 pm, ACCN Extra | No. 17 | Boston College | W 58–51 | 16–5 (5–4) | Watsco Center (1,868); Coral Gables, FL |
| Feb 2, 2017; 7:00 pm, ACCN Extra | No. 16 | at Wake Forest | W 79–56 | 17–5 (6–4) | LJVM Coliseum (419); Winston-Salem, NC |
| Feb 6, 2017; 7:00 pm, RSN | No. 16 | at No. 5 Florida State | L 71–80 | 17–6 (6–5) | Donald L. Tucker Civic Center (3,571); Tallahassee, FL |
| Feb 9, 2017; 7:00 pm, ACCN Extra | No. 16 | Virginia | W 63–52 | 18–6 (7–5) | Watsco Center (1,008); Coral Gables, FL |
| Feb 12, 2017; 2:00 pm, ACCN Extra | No. 16 | Clemson | W 81–57 | 19–6 (8–5) | Watsco Center (2,312); Coral Gables, FL |
| Feb 19, 2017; 1:00 pm, RSN | No. 16 | at No. 13 Duke | L 70–83 | 19–7 (8–6) | Cameron Indoor Stadium (4,153); Durham, NC |
| Feb 23, 2017; 7:00 pm, ACCN Extra | No. 17 | at Virginia Tech | W 79–69 | 20–7 (9–6) | Cassell Coliseum (2,377); Blacksburg, VA |
| Feb 26, 2017; 1:00 pm, RSN | No. 17 | Georgia Tech | W 75–70 | 21–7 (10–6) | Watsco Center (1,321); Coral Gables, FL |
ACC Women's Tournament
| Mar 2, 2017; 6:00 pm, RSN | (7) No. 16 | vs. (10) Georgia Tech; Second Round | W 87–71 | 22–7 | HTC Center (3,145); Conway, SC |
| Mar 3, 2017; 6:00 pm, RSN | (7) No. 16 | vs. (2) No. 8 Florida State; Quarterfinals | W 56–54 | 23–7 | HTC Center (3,600); Conway, SC |
| Mar 4, 2017; 2:30 pm, ESPNU | (7) No. 16 | vs. (3) No. 13 Duke; Semifinals | L 52–57 | 23–8 | HTC Center (3,600); Conway, SC |
NCAA Women's Tournament
| Mar 18, 2017*; 4:00 pm, ESPN2 | (4 S) No. 16 | (13 S) Florida Gulf Coast; First Round | W 62–60 | 24–8 | Watsco Center (2,232); Coral Gables, FL |
| Mar 20, 2017*; 9:00 pm, ESPN2 | (4 S) No. 16 | (12 S) Quinnipiac; Second Round | L 78–85 | 24–9 | Watsco Center (1,972); Coral Gables, FL |
*Non-conference game. ^{#}Rankings from AP Poll. (#) Tournament seedings in parentheses. S=Stockton Region. All times are in Eastern.

== Rankings ==
Regular season polls
| Poll | Pre- season | Week 2 | Week 3 | Week 4 | Week 5 | Week 6 | Week 7 | Week 8 | Week 9 | Week 10 | Week 11 | Week 12 | Week 13 | Week 14 | Week 15 | Week 16 | Week 17 | Week 18 | Week 19 | Final |
|---|---|---|---|---|---|---|---|---|---|---|---|---|---|---|---|---|---|---|---|---|
| AP | 14 | 22 | 21 | 18 | 14 | 13 | 11 | 11 | 14 | 14 | 14 | 17 | 16 | 16 | 16 | 17 | 16 | 16 | 16 | N/A |
| Coaches | 20 | 22 | 22 | 16 | 13 | 12 | 11 | 11 | 14 | 14 | 14т | 17 | 16 | 17т | 17 | 17 | 16 | 16 | 16 | 19 |

Legend
| | Increase in ranking |
| | Decrease in ranking |
| | Not ranked previous week |
| (RV) | Received votes |
