= 2016–17 Boston College Eagles women's basketball team =

Intercollegiate basketball season

2016–17 Boston College Eagles women's basketball
- Conference: Atlantic Coast Conference
- Record: 9–21 (2–14 ACC)
- Head coach: Erik Johnson (5th season)
- Assistant coaches: Yvonne Hawkins; Thomas Garrick; Jesyka Burks-Wiley
- Home arena: Conte Forum

2016–17 ACC women's basketball standings
	Conf.				Overall
Team	W		L	PCT	W		L	PCT
No. 2 Notre Dame^{†}	15	–	1	.938	33	–	4	.892
No. 9 Duke	13	–	3	.813	28	–	6	.824
No. 10 Florida State	13	–	3	.813	28	–	7	.800
No. 13 Louisville	12	–	4	.750	29	–	8	.784
No. 17 NC State	12	–	4	.750	23	–	9	.719
No. 21 Syracuse	11	–	5	.688	22	–	11	.667
No. 16 Miami (FL)	10	–	6	.625	24	–	9	.727
Virginia	7	–	9	.438	20	–	13	.606
Wake Forest	6	–	10	.375	16	–	16	.500
Georgia Tech	5	–	11	.313	22	–	14	.611
Virginia Tech	4	–	12	.250	20	–	14	.588
Pittsburgh	4	–	12	.250	13	–	17	.433
Clemson	3	–	13	.188	15	–	16	.484
North Carolina	3	–	13	.188	15	–	16	.484
Boston College	2	–	14	.125	9	–	21	.300
† 2017 ACC tournament winner As of March 29, 2017; Rankings from AP poll

The 2016–17 Boston College Eagles women's basketball team represented Boston College during the 2016–17 NCAA Division I women's basketball season. The Eagles, were led by fifth year head coach Erik Johnson. They played their home games at the Conte Forum and were members of the Atlantic Coast Conference. They finished the season 9–21, 2–14 in ACC play to finish in last place. They lost in the first round of the ACC women's tournament to Georgia Tech.

== 2016–17 media ==
=== Boston College IMG Sports Network Affiliates ===
Select BC games, mostly home games and conference road games, will be broadcast on ZBC Sports. BC Game notes and stories will continue to be posted through their athletic website and on Twitter by following @bc_wbb.

== Roster ==
2016–17 Boston College Eagles women's basketball team
Players
Coaches

Pos.	#	Name	Height	Year	Previous school	Hometown
G	1	Stephanie Jones	5 ft 7 in (1.7 m)	So	Loomis Chaffee School	Shelton, CT
F	2	Georgia Pineau	6 ft 1 in (1.85 m)	Fr	Caulfield Grammar	Victoria, Australia
G	4	Taylor Ortlepp	5 ft 9 in (1.75 m)	Fr	St. Ignatius College	Adelaide, Australia
G	5	Rachel Gartner	5 ft 8 in (1.73 m)	RS Jr	Danbury	Danbury, CT
G/F	10	Ella Awobajo	6 ft 0 in (1.83 m)	RS So	Neumann-Goretti	Kaduna, Nigeria
F	11	Emma Guy	6 ft 3 in (1.91 m)	Fr	Penfield High School	Penfield, NY
G/F	14	Kailey Edwards	5 ft 9 in (1.75 m)	RS Sr	Legacy; Denver	Broomfield, CO
G/F	20	Jasmine Taylor	6 ft 0 in (1.83 m)	Fr	Bishop O'Connell	Springfield, VA
G	21	Martina Mosetti	5 ft 9 in (1.75 m)	Jr	Niccolo Tron	Trieste, Italy
G/F	22	Emilee Daley	6 ft 1 in (1.85 m)	Sr	Rivers School	Sharon, MA
G	23	Kelly Hughes	5 ft 11 in (1.8 m)	Sr	Point Pleasant Boro	Point Pleasant, NJ
F/C	24	Shannon Ryan	6 ft 4 in (1.93 m)	Fr	Tabor Academy	Plattsburgh, NY
F/C	34	Mariella Fasoula	6 ft 4 in (1.93 m)	So	American Community School of Athens	Athens, Greece
C	42	Katie Quandt	6 ft 3 in (1.91 m)	Jr	Lakeville South	Lakeville, MN

Head coach

- Erik Johnson (UC San Diego)

Assistant coach(es)

- Yvonne Hawkins (Ashland)
- Thomas Garrick (Rhode Island)
- Jesyka Burks-Wiley (Boston University)

Legend

- (C) Team captain
- (S) Suspended
- (I) Ineligible
- (W) Walk-on
- Injured
- Current redshirt

Roster

== Schedule ==
Date time, TV	Rank^{#}	Opponent^{#}	Result	Record	Site (attendance) city, state
Non-conference regular season
11/11/2016*; 7:00 pm		at Hartford	L 56–65	0–1	Chase Arena at Reich Family Pavilion (1,078); Hartford, CT
11/14/2016*; 7:00 pm, ACCN Extra		Boston University	W 67–49	1–1	Conte Forum (623); Chestnut Hill, MA
11/17/2016*; 7:00 pm		at Seton Hall	L 66–71	1–2	Walsh Gymnasium (1,451); South Orange, NJ
11/20/2016*; 4:00 pm, ACCN Extra		Saint Mary's	L 54–62	1–3	Conte Forum (559); Chestnut Hill, MA
11/25/2016*; 7:00 pm		vs. SMU; Omni Hotels Classic semifinals	L 62–71	1–4	Coors Events Center (1,483); Boulder, CO
11/26/2016*; 3:30 pm		vs. St. Francis Brooklyn; Omni Hotels Classic 3rd place game	W 73–58	2–4	Coors Events Center (1,495); Boulder, CO
11/30/2016*; 7:00 pm, ACCN Extra		Penn State; ACC–Big Ten Women's Challenge	L 56–60	2–5	Conte Forum (531); Chestnut Hill, MA
12/04/2016*; 2:00 pm		at Fordham	L 49–56	2–6	Rose Hill Gymnasium (811); Bronx, NY
12/07/2016*; 7:00 pm, ESPN3		at Yale	W 71–64	3–6	John J. Lee Amphitheater (253); New Haven, CT
12/10/2016*; 4:00 pm, ACCN Extra		Providence	W 57–53	4–6	Conte Forum (905); Chestnut Hill, MA
12/18/2016*; 4:00 pm, ACCN Extra		Central Connecticut	W 66–46	5–6	Conte Forum (262); Chestnut Hill, MA
12/21/2016*; 11:00 am, ACCN Extra		Dartmouth	W 65–53	6–6	Conte Forum (2,138); Chestnut Hill, MA
12/30/2016*; 2:00 pm, ACCN Extra		Maine	W 64–53	7–6	Conte Forum (1,323); Chestnut Hill, MA
ACC regular season
01/02/2017; 7:00 pm, RSN		Clemson	W 60–48	8–6 (1–0)	Conte Forum (538); Chestnut Hill, MA
01/05/2017; 7:00 pm, RSN		at Pittsburgh	L 43–56	8–7 (1–1)	Petersen Events Center (538); Pittsburgh, PA
01/08/2017; 2:00 pm		at Syracuse	L 52–79	8–8 (1–2)	Carrier Dome (1,614); Syracuse, NY
01/12/2017; 7:00 pm, ACCN Extra		Georgia Tech	W 67–61	8–9 (1–3)	Conte Forum (535); Chestnut Hill, MA
01/15/2017; 2:00 pm, ACCN Extra		at Virginia	L 55–62	8–10 (1–4)	John Paul Jones Arena (3,208); Charlottesville, VA
01/19/2017; 7:00 pm, ACCN Extra		No. 6 Notre Dame	L 69–80	8–11 (1–5)	Conte Forum (1,108); Chestnut Hill, MA
01/22/2017; 2:00 pm, ACCN Extra		No. 15 Duke	L 44–67	8–12 (1–6)	Conte Forum (1,374); Chestnut Hill, MA
01/26/2017; 7:00 pm, ACCN Extra		at Wake Forest	L 55–71	8–13 (1–7)	LJVM Coliseum (427); Winston-Salem, NC
01/29/2017; 1:00 pm, ACCN Extra		at No. 17 Miami (FL)	L 51–58	8–14 (1–8)	BankUnited Center (1,868); Coral Gables, FL
02/02/2017; 1:00 pm, ACCN Extra		No. 6 Florida State	L 53–85	8–15 (1–9)	Conte Forum (802); Chestnut Hill, MA
02/05/2017; 2:00 pm, ACCN Extra		No. 24 Syracuse	L 45–72	8–16 (1–10)	Conte Forum (947); Chestnut Hill, MA
02/09/2017; 5:30 pm, ACCN Extra		at North Carolina	W 88–77	9–16 (2–10)	Carmichael Auditorium (1,506); Chapel Hill, NC
02/12/2017; 3:00 pm, RSN		at No. 12 Louisville	L 43–68	9–17 (2–11)	KFC Yum! Center (9,306); Louisville, KY
02/16/2017; 7:00 pm, ACCN Extra		No. 15 NC State	L 58–70	9–18 (2–12)	Conte Forum (781); Chestnut Hill, MA
02/23/2017; 7:00 pm, ACCN Extra		at No. 5 Notre Dame	L 45–82	9–19 (2–13)	Edmund P. Joyce Center (8,376); South Bend, IN
02/26/2017; 2:00 pm, ACCN Extra		Virginia Tech	L 78–82	9–20 (2–14)	Conte Forum (1,513); Chestnut Hill, MA
ACC Women's Tournament
03/01/2017; 3:30 pm, RSN		vs. Georgia Tech; First Round	L 67–71	9–21	HTC Center (2,769); Conway, SC
*Non-conference game. ^{#}Rankings from AP Poll. (#) Tournament seedings in parentheses. All times are in Eastern.

== Rankings ==
2016–17 NCAA Division I women's basketball rankings

Regular season polls
Poll	Pre- Season	Week 2	Week 3	Week 4	Week 5	Week 6	Week 7	Week 8	Week 9	Week 10	Week 11	Week 12	Week 13	Week 14	Week 15	Week 16	Week 17	Week 18	Week 19	Final
AP																				N/A
Coaches																				

Legend
	Increase in ranking
	Decrease in ranking
	Not ranked previous week
(RV)	Received Votes

== See also ==
- 2016–17 Boston College Eagles men's basketball team
