= 2016–17 Virginia Tech Hokies women's basketball team =

Intercollegiate basketball season

2016–17 Virginia Tech Hokies women's basketball

WNIT, Quarterfinals
- Conference: Atlantic Coast Conference
- Record: 20–14 (4–12 ACC)
- Head coach: Kenny Brooks (1st season)
- Assistant coaches: Britney Anderson; Jennifer Brown; Shawn Poppie
- Home arena: Cassell Coliseum

2016–17 ACC women's basketball standings
	Conf.				Overall
Team	W		L	PCT	W		L	PCT
No. 2 Notre Dame^{†}	15	–	1	.938	33	–	4	.892
No. 9 Duke	13	–	3	.813	28	–	6	.824
No. 10 Florida State	13	–	3	.813	28	–	7	.800
No. 13 Louisville	12	–	4	.750	29	–	8	.784
No. 17 NC State	12	–	4	.750	23	–	9	.719
No. 21 Syracuse	11	–	5	.688	22	–	11	.667
No. 16 Miami (FL)	10	–	6	.625	24	–	9	.727
Virginia	7	–	9	.438	20	–	13	.606
Wake Forest	6	–	10	.375	16	–	16	.500
Georgia Tech	5	–	11	.313	22	–	14	.611
Virginia Tech	4	–	12	.250	20	–	14	.588
Pittsburgh	4	–	12	.250	13	–	17	.433
Clemson	3	–	13	.188	15	–	16	.484
North Carolina	3	–	13	.188	15	–	16	.484
Boston College	2	–	14	.125	9	–	21	.300
† 2017 ACC tournament winner As of March 29, 2017; Rankings from AP poll

The 2016–17 Virginia Tech Hokies women's basketball team represented Virginia Polytechnic Institute and State University during the 2016–17 NCAA Division I women's basketball season. The Hokies, led by first year head coach Kenny Brooks, played their home games at Cassell Coliseum and were members of the Atlantic Coast Conference. They finished the season 20–14, 4–12 in ACC play to finish in a tie for eleventh place. They lost in the first round of the ACC women's tournament to Clemson. They were invited to the Women's National Invitation Tournament where they defeated Rider, Navy and Penn State in the first, second and third rounds before losing to Michigan in the quarterfinals.

== 2016–17 media ==
=== Virginia Tech Hokies Sports Network ===
The Virginia Tech Hokies IMG Sports Network broadcast Hokies games on WNMX. Andrew Allegretta provided the call for the games and for select ESPN3 games. All WNMX games and games not on WNMX could be heard online through HokiesXtra.

== Roster ==
2016–17 Virginia Tech Hokies women's basketball team
Players
Coaches

Pos.	#	Name	Height	Year	Previous school	Hometown
G	1	Genesis Parker	5 ft 9 in (1.75 m)	Fr	Stonewall Jackson	Bristow, VA
F	2	Sidney Cook	6 ft 2 in (1.88 m)	Sr	South View; Seton Hall	Parkton, NC
G	3	Diandra DaRosa	5 ft 7 in (1.7 m)	Jr	William E. Tolman; ASA College	Pawtucket, RI
G	5	Vanessa Panousis	5 ft 7 in (1.7 m)	Sr	Brigidine College Randwick	Sydney, Australia
G	10	Kendyl Brooks	5 ft 8 in (1.73 m)	Fr	Spotswood	Harrisonburg, VA
F	11	Regan Magarity	6 ft 3 in (1.91 m)	RS Fr	Igelstavikens Gymnasium	Norrköping, Sweden
G	12	Chanette Hicks	5 ft 6 in (1.68 m)	So	Maury	Norfolk, VA
F	13	Erin Garner (I) (redshirt)	6 ft 3 in (1.91 m)	Jr	Trenton Catholic Academy; Georgia Tech	Philadelphia, PA
G	14	Kaela Kinder	5 ft 10 in (1.78 m)	Fr	Christ the King	Inwood, NY
F	15	Michelle Berry (I) (redshirt)	6 ft 2 in (1.88 m)	So	Miami Country Day; Cal State Fullerton	Miami, FL
F	20	Heidi Brown	6 ft 0 in (1.83 m)	So	Sherando	Winchester, VA
G	23	Rachel Camp	5 ft 11 in (1.8 m)	Jr	East Rutherford	Forest City, NC
F	24	Jaiden McCoy	6 ft 3 in (1.91 m)	Fr	Farragut	Knoxville, TN
G	25	Samantha Hill	5 ft 10 in (1.78 m)	Jr	Eastern Commerce	Toronto, ON
F	33	Kelly Koshuta	6 ft 2 in (1.88 m)	So	James Madison	Vienna, VA
F	40	Erinn Brooks	5 ft 9 in (1.75 m)	So	Franklin County	Union Hall, VA

Head coach

- Kenny Brooks (James Madison)

Assistant coach(es)

- Britney Anderson (Virginia Tech)
- Jennifer Brown (James Madison)
- Shawn Poppie (Limestone)

Legend

- (C) Team captain
- (S) Suspended
- (I) Ineligible
- (W) Walk-on
- Injured
- Current redshirt

Roster

== Schedule ==
Date time, TV	Rank^{#}	Opponent^{#}	Result	Record	Site (attendance) city, state
Non-conference regular season
11/11/2016*; 3:30 pm		UNC Asheville	W 71–52	1–0	Cassell Coliseum (2,346); Blacksburg, VA
11/13/2016*; 4:00 pm		Georgetown	W 73–63	2–0	Cassell Coliseum (2,285); Blacksburg, VA
11/16/2016*; 7:00 pm		Presbyterian	W 67–36	3–0	Cassell Coliseum (1,084); Blacksburg, VA
11/19/2016*; 2:00 pm		at Central Florida	W 67–64	4–0	CFE Arena (2,278); Orlando, FL
11/22/2016*; 6:30 pm		at College of Charleston	W 71–61	5–0	TD Arena (330); Charleston, SC
11/27/2016*; 2:00 pm, ACCN Extra		No. 17 Tennessee	W 67–63	6–0	Cassell Coliseum (3,159); Blacksburg, VA
12/01/2016*; 7:00 pm		Nebraska; ACC–Big Ten Women's Challenge	W 76–67	7–0	Cassell Coliseum (2,292); Blacksburg, VA
12/05/2016*; 7:00 pm	No. 25	Gardner–Webb	W 76–42	8–0	Cassell Coliseum (2,183); Blacksburg, VA
12/07/2016*; 6:00 pm	No. 25	Central Connecticut	W 81–47	9–0	Cassell Coliseum (2,273); Blacksburg, VA
12/11/2016*; 3:30 pm	No. 25	Bowling Green	W 98–51	10–0	Cassell Coliseum (2,449); Blacksburg, VA
12/18/2016*; 5:00 pm	No. 24	at Auburn	W 92–87 ^{OT}	11–0	Auburn Arena (2,158); Auburn, AL
12/21/2016*; 1:00 pm	No. 23	Radford	W 71–52	12–0	Cassell Coliseum (2,567); Blacksburg, VA
12/30/2016*; 7:00 pm	No. 19	Delaware State	W 88–48	13–0	Cassell Coliseum (1,352); Blacksburg, VA
ACC regular season
01/02/2017; 7:00 pm	No. 17	North Carolina	W 76–68	14–0 (1–0)	Cassell Coliseum (2,170); Blacksburg, VA
01/08/2017; 2:00 pm	No. 17	at Clemson	W 78–69	15–0 (2–0)	Littlejohn Coliseum (306); Clemson, SC
01/11/2017; 7:00 pm	No. 15	at No. 14 Miami (FL)	L 75–82	15–1 (2–1)	Watsco Center (685); Coral Gables, FL
01/16/2017; 1:00 pm, RSN	No. 17	Wake Forest	W 72–70	16–1 (3–1)	Cassell Coliseum (1,789); Blacksburg, VA
01/19/2017; 1:00 pm, ACCN Extra	No. 17	at No. 15 Duke	L 59–84	16–2 (3–2)	Cameron Indoor Stadium (3,755); Durham, NC
01/22/2017; 12:00 pm, ACCN Extra	No. 17	No. 7 Florida State	L 54–82	16–3 (3–3)	Cassell Coliseum (2,092); Blacksburg, VA
01/26/2017; 7:00 pm, ACCN Extra	No. 19	at Virginia; Commonwealth Clash	L 27–76	16–4 (3–4)	John Paul Jones Arena (3,725); Charlottesville, VA
01/29/2017; 2:00 pm, ACCN Extra	No. 19	Syracuse	L 72–82	16–5 (3–5)	Cassell Coliseum (2,033); Blacksburg, VA
02/02/2017; 7:00 pm, ACCN Extra		No. 7 Notre Dame	L 59–76	16–6 (3–6)	Cassell Coliseum (8,325); Blacksburg, VA
02/05/2017; 2:00 pm		at Georgia Tech	L 81–87	16–7 (3–7)	Hank McCamish Pavilion (1,023); Atlanta, GA
02/09/2017; 7:00 pm, ACCN Extra		No. 12 Louisville	L 70–88	16–8 (3–8)	Cassell Coliseum (1,723); Blacksburg, VA
02/12/2017; 2:00 pm, ACCN Extra		at No. 17 NC State	L 71–85	16–9 (3–9)	Reynolds Coliseum (4,467); Raleigh, NC
02/16/2017; 7:00 pm		at Pittsburgh	L 64–72	16–10 (3–10)	Petersen Events Center (787); Pittsburgh, PA
02/19/2017; 3:00 pm, RSN		Virginia; Commonwealth Clash	L 55–63	16–11 (3–11)	Cassell Coliseum (3,779); Blacksburg, VA
02/23/2017; 7:00 pm		No. 17 Miami (FL)	L 69–79	16–12 (3–12)	Cassell Coliseum (2,377); Blacksburg, VA
02/26/2017; 2:00 pm		at Boston College	W 82–78	17–12 (4–12)	Conte Forum (1,513); Chestnut Hill, MA
ACC Women's Tournament
03/01/2017; 1:00 pm, RSN	(12)	vs. (13) Clemson; First Round	L 66–67	17–13	HTC Center; Conway, SC
WNIT
03/17/2017*; 7:00 pm		Rider; First Round	W 76–62	18–13	Cassell Coliseum (806); Blacksburg, VA
03/19/2017*; 2:00 pm		Navy; Second Round	W 75–64	19–13	Cassell Coliseum (768); Blacksburg, VA
03/23/2017*; 7:00 pm		at Penn State; Third Round	W 64–55	20–13	Bryce Jordan Center (1,310); University Park, PA
03/25/2017*; 2:00 pm		at Michigan; Quarterfinals	L 62–80	20–14	Crisler Center (1,019); Ann Arbor, MI
*Non-conference game. ^{#}Rankings from AP Poll. (#) Tournament seedings in parentheses. All times are in Eastern.

== Rankings ==
2016–17 NCAA Division I women's basketball rankings

Regular season polls
Poll	Pre- Season	Week 2	Week 3	Week 4	Week 5	Week 6	Week 7	Week 8	Week 9	Week 10	Week 11	Week 12	Week 13	Week 14	Week 15	Week 16	Week 17	Week 18	Week 19	Final
AP	NR	NR	NR	RV	25	24	23	19	17	15	17	19	RV	NR	NR	NR				N/A
Coaches	NR	NR	RV	RV	RV	25	23	20	18	16	16т	21	RV	NR	NR	NR				

Legend
	Increase in ranking
	Decrease in ranking
	Not ranked previous week
(RV)	Received Votes

== See also ==
- 2016–17 Virginia Tech Hokies men's basketball team
