= 2016–17 Virginia Cavaliers women's basketball team =

Intercollegiate basketball season

2016–17 Virginia Cavaliers women's basketball

WNIT, Second Round
- Conference: Atlantic Coast Conference
- Record: 20–13 (7–9 ACC)
- Head coach: Joanne Boyle (6th season)
- Assistant coaches: La'Keshia Frett Meredith; Cory McNeill; Tim Taylor
- Home arena: John Paul Jones Arena

2016–17 ACC women's basketball standings
	Conf.				Overall
Team	W		L	PCT	W		L	PCT
No. 2 Notre Dame^{†}	15	–	1	.938	33	–	4	.892
No. 9 Duke	13	–	3	.813	28	–	6	.824
No. 10 Florida State	13	–	3	.813	28	–	7	.800
No. 13 Louisville	12	–	4	.750	29	–	8	.784
No. 17 NC State	12	–	4	.750	23	–	9	.719
No. 21 Syracuse	11	–	5	.688	22	–	11	.667
No. 16 Miami (FL)	10	–	6	.625	24	–	9	.727
Virginia	7	–	9	.438	20	–	13	.606
Wake Forest	6	–	10	.375	16	–	16	.500
Georgia Tech	5	–	11	.313	22	–	14	.611
Virginia Tech	4	–	12	.250	20	–	14	.588
Pittsburgh	4	–	12	.250	13	–	17	.433
Clemson	3	–	13	.188	15	–	16	.484
North Carolina	3	–	13	.188	15	–	16	.484
Boston College	2	–	14	.125	9	–	21	.300
† 2017 ACC tournament winner As of March 29, 2017; Rankings from AP poll

The 2016–17 Virginia Cavaliers women's basketball team represented the University of Virginia during the 2016–17 NCAA Division I women's basketball season. The Cavaliers, led by sixth year head coach Joanne Boyle, played their home games at John Paul Jones Arena and were members the Atlantic Coast Conference. They finished the season 20–13, 7–9 in ACC play to finish in eighth place. They advanced in the quarterfinals of the ACC women's tournament, where they lost to Notre Dame. They were invited to the Women's National Invitation Tournament, where they defeated Saint Joseph's first round before losing to James Madison in the second round.

== 2016–17 media ==
=== Virginia Cavaliers Sports Network ===
The Virginia Cavaliers Sports Network will broadcast select Cavaliers games on WINA. John Freeman, Larry Johnson, and Myron Ripley will provide the call for the games. Games not broadcast on WINA can be listened to online through Cavaliers Live at virginiasports.com.

== Roster ==
2016–17 Virginia Cavaliers women's basketball team
Players
Coaches

Pos.	#	Name	Height	Year	Previous school	Hometown
C	00	Debra Ferguson	6 ft 4 in (1.93 m)	So	Amherst County	Madison Heights, VA
F	2	Jae'Lisa Allen	6 ft 2 in (1.88 m)	Jr	White Hall	Pine Bluff, AR
G	4	Dominique Toussaint	5 ft 9 in (1.75 m)	Fr	Christ the King	Staten Island, NY
G	10	J'Kyra Brown	5 ft 11 in (1.8 m)	RS Jr	Rocky Mount; East Carolina	Rocky Mount, NC
G	12	Breyana Mason	5 ft 8 in (1.73 m)	Sr	Forest Park	Woodbridge, VA
G	13	Jocelyn Willoughby	6 ft 0 in (1.83 m)	Fr	Newark Academy	Woodbridge, VA
F	14	Lisa Jablonowski	6 ft 3 in (1.91 m)	Fr	Lycée de garçons	Steinsel, France
F	21	Lauren Moses	6 ft 2 in (1.88 m)	Jr	Rancocas	Mt. Holly, NJ
G	23	Aliyah Huland El	6 ft 1 in (1.85 m)	Jr	Randolph	Randolph, NJ
C	30	Felicia Aiyeotan	6 ft 9 in (2.06 m)	Fr	Blair Academy	Lagos, Nigeria
F	32	Moné Jones	6 ft 3 in (1.91 m)	So	Riverside	Durham, NC
F	35	Shakyna Payne	6 ft 3 in (1.91 m)	So	Southwest Atlanta Christian Academy	Acworth, GA

Head coach

- Joanne Boyle (Duke)

Assistant coach(es)

- La'Keisha Frett Meredith (Georgia)
- Cory McNeill (Morgan State)
- Tim Taylor (James Madison)

Legend

- (C) Team captain
- (S) Suspended
- (I) Ineligible
- (W) Walk-on
- Injured
- Current redshirt

Roster

== Schedule ==
Date time, TV	Rank^{#}	Opponent^{#}	Result	Record	Site (attendance) city, state
Non-conference regular season
November 11*; 7:00 pm		Middle Tennessee	W 63–51	1–0	John Paul Jones Arena (2,837); Charlottesville, VA
November 13*; 2:00 pm		Coppin State	W 103–40	2–0	John Paul Jones Arena (3,590); Charlottesville, VA
November 16*; 7:00 pm		at Richmond	W 63–56	3–0	Robins Center (653); Richmond, VA
November 20*; 6:00 pm		Rutgers	W 62–54	4–0	John Paul Jones Arena (2,621); Charlottesville, VA
November 25*; 6:30 pm		vs. St. John's; South Point Thanksgiving Shootout	L 55–66	4–1	South Point Arena; Enterprise, NV
November 26*; 9:00 pm		vs. Nebraska; South Point Thanksgiving Shootout	W 73–51	5–1	South Point Arena (400); Enterprise, NV
December 1*; 9:00 pm, BTN		at Northwestern; ACC–Big Ten Women's Challenge	L 60–69	5–2	Welsh-Ryan Arena (694); Evanston, IL
December 4*; 2:00 pm		at Bowling Green	W 67–47	6–2	Stroh Center (1,823); Bowling Green, OH
December 16*; 7:00 pm, ACCN Extra		UIC	W 76–39	7–2	John Paul Jones Arena (3,060); Charlottesville, VA
December 19*; 7:00 pm, SECN		at Georgia	W 66–43	8–2	Stegeman Coliseum (2,631); Athens, GA
December 21*; 7:00 pm, ACCN Extra		Maryland Eastern Shore	W 60–50	9–2	John Paul Jones Arena (2,689); Charlottesville, VA
December 28*; 7:00 pm, ACCN Extra		UMBC; Cavalier Classic	W 56–30	10–2	John Paul Jones Arena (2,883); Charlottesville, VA
December 29*; 7:00 pm, ACCN Extra		Dayton; Cavalier Classic	W 66–56	11–2	John Paul Jones Arena (2,740); Charlottesville, VA
Conference regular season
January 2; 7:00 pm		at Syracuse	L 49–54	11–3 (0–1)	Carrier Dome (938); Syracuse, NY
January 5; 7:00 pm, ACCN Extra		No. 8 Louisville	L 81–86 ^{OT}	11–4 (0–2)	John Paul Jones Arena (2,490); Charlottesville, VA
January 8; 2:00 pm		at North Carolina	L 58–67	11–5 (0–3)	Carmichael Arena (505); Chapel Hill, NC
January 15; 2:00 pm, ACCN Extra		Boston College	W 62–55	12–5 (1–3)	John Paul Jones Arena (3,208); Charlottesville, VA
January 19; 7:00 pm, ACCN Extra		at Clemson	W 69–37	13–5 (2–3)	Littlejohn Coliseum (319); Clemson, SC
January 22; 12:00 pm, RSN		Pittsburgh	L 54–62	13–6 (2–4)	Petersen Events Center (2,224); Pittsburgh, PA
January 26; 7:00 pm, ACCN Extra		No. 19 Virginia Tech; Commonwealth Classic	W 76–27	14–6 (3–4)	John Paul Jones Arena (3,725); Charlottesville, VA
January 29; 12:00 pm, ESPNU		at No. 8 Notre Dame	L 74–82	14–7 (3–5)	Edmund P. Joyce Center (9,149); South Bend, IN
February 2; 7:00 pm, RSN		Georgia Tech	W 65–64 ^{OT}	15–7 (4–5)	John Paul Jones Arena (3,187); Charlottesville, VA
February 5; 1:00 pm, RSN		No. 15 Duke	L 51–70	15–8 (4–6)	John Paul Jones Arena (4,361); Charlottesville, VA
February 9; 7:00 pm, ACCN Extra		at No. 16 Miami (FL)	L 52–63	15–9 (4–7)	Watsco Center (1,008); Coral Gables, FL
February 12; 2:00 pm, ACCN Extra		Wake Forest	W 60–57 ^{OT}	16–9 (5–7)	John Paul Jones Arena (4,378); Charlottesville, VA
February 16; 7:00 pm, RSN		No. 4 Florida State	W 60–51	17–9 (6–7)	John Paul Jones Arena (3,161); Charlottesville, VA
February 19; 3:00 pm, RSN		at Virginia Tech; Commonwealth Classic	W 63–55	18–9 (7–7)	Cassell Coliseum (3,779); Blacksburg, VA
February 23; 7:00 pm, ACCN Extra		at No. 14 Louisville	L 55–66	18–10 (7–8)	KFC Yum! Center (7,981); Louisville, KY
February 26; 2:00 pm, ACCN Extra		No. 18 NC State	L 48–59	18–11 (7–9)	John Paul Jones Arena (3,819); Charlottesville, VA
ACC Women's Tournament
March 2; 2:00 pm, RSN	(8)	vs. (9) Wake Forest; Second Round	W 61–44	19–11	HTC Center (2,466); Conway, SC
March 3; 2:00 pm, RSN	(8)	vs. (1) No. 3 Notre Dame; Quarterfinals	L 59–76	19–12	HTC Center (2,845); Conway, SC
WNIT
March 17; 7:00 pm		at Saint Joseph's; First Round	W 62–56	20–12	Hagan Arena (931); Philadelphia, PA
March 19; 2:00 pm		at James Madison; Second Round	L 55–61	20–13	JMU Convocation Center (1,626); Harrisonburg, VA
*Non-conference game. ^{#}Rankings from AP Poll. (#) Tournament seedings in parentheses. All times are in Eastern.

== Rankings ==
Regular season polls
Poll	Pre- Season	Week 2	Week 3	Week 4	Week 5	Week 6	Week 7	Week 8	Week 9	Week 10	Week 11	Week 12	Week 13	Week 14	Week 15	Week 16	Week 17	Week 18	Week 19	Final
AP	NR	NR	NR	NR	NR	NR	NR	NR	NR	NR	NR	NR	NR	NR	NR	NR	NR	NR	NR	N/A
Coaches	NR	NR	NR	RV	NR	NR	NR	NR	NR	NR	NR	NR	NR	NR	NR	RV	RV	RV	RV	

Legend
	Increase in ranking
	Decrease in ranking
	Not ranked previous week
(RV)	Received Votes

== See also ==
- 2016–17 Virginia Cavaliers men's basketball team
