= 2016–17 Wake Forest Demon Deacons women's basketball team =

Intercollegiate basketball season

2016–17 Wake Forest Demon Deacons women's basketball

WNIT, Second Round
- Conference: Atlantic Coast Conference
- Record: 16–16 (6–10 ACC)
- Head coach: Jen Hoover (5th season)
- Assistant coaches: Mike Terry; Gayle Coats Fulks; Dane Sparrow
- Home arena: LJVM Coliseum

2016–17 ACC women's basketball standings
	Conf.				Overall
Team	W		L	PCT	W		L	PCT
No. 2 Notre Dame^{†}	15	–	1	.938	33	–	4	.892
No. 9 Duke	13	–	3	.813	28	–	6	.824
No. 10 Florida State	13	–	3	.813	28	–	7	.800
No. 13 Louisville	12	–	4	.750	29	–	8	.784
No. 17 NC State	12	–	4	.750	23	–	9	.719
No. 21 Syracuse	11	–	5	.688	22	–	11	.667
No. 16 Miami (FL)	10	–	6	.625	24	–	9	.727
Virginia	7	–	9	.438	20	–	13	.606
Wake Forest	6	–	10	.375	16	–	16	.500
Georgia Tech	5	–	11	.313	22	–	14	.611
Virginia Tech	4	–	12	.250	20	–	14	.588
Pittsburgh	4	–	12	.250	13	–	17	.433
Clemson	3	–	13	.188	15	–	16	.484
North Carolina	3	–	13	.188	15	–	16	.484
Boston College	2	–	14	.125	9	–	21	.300
† 2017 ACC tournament winner As of March 29, 2017; Rankings from AP poll

The 2016–17 Wake Forest Demon Deacons women's basketball team represented Wake Forest University during the 2016–17 NCAA Division I women's basketball season. The Demon Deacons, led by fifth-year head coach Jen Hoover, were members of the Atlantic Coast Conference and played their home games at the Lawrence Joel Veterans Memorial Coliseum. They finished the season 16–16, 6–10 in ACC play to finish in ninth place. They lost in the second round of the ACC women's tournament to Virginia. They were invited to the Women's National Invitation Tournament, where they defeated Bethune-Cookman in the first round before losing to Middle Tennessee in the second round.

== 2016–17 media ==
The Wake Forest Demon Deacons IMG Sports Network broadcast Demon Deacons games on Wake Forest All Access. Information was also available on Twitter @WakeWBB. Post-game interviews were posted on the school's YouTube channel.

== Roster ==
2016–17 Wake Forest Demon Deacons women's basketball team
Players
Coaches

Pos.	#	Name	Height	Year	Previous school	Hometown
G/F	1	Destini Walker	6 ft 0 in (1.83 m)	So	Hermitage	Ossining, NY
G	2	Amber Campbell	5 ft 9 in (1.75 m)	Jr	Northwood Academy	Charleston, SC
G	3	Ataijah Taylor	5 ft 9 in (1.75 m)	Jr	Salem	Roanoke, VA
F	5	Clarisse Berranger	6 ft 3 in (1.91 m)	RS Sr	Lycée Alain-Fournier; Université de Limoges	Remiremont, France
G	10	Taylor Gordon	5 ft 11 in (1.8 m)	RS So	McEachern	Powder Springs, GA
G	11	Jill Brunori	6 ft 1 in (1.85 m)	RS Jr	Hilton Head Preparatory	Hilton Head, SC
G	14	Alex Sharp	6 ft 1 in (1.85 m)	Fr	Australian Institute of Sport	Melbourne, Australia
G	15	Kortni Simmons	5 ft 8 in (1.73 m)	So	West Florence	Spotsylvania, PA
F	21	Raegyn Branch	6 ft 2 in (1.88 m)	Fr	Arlington	Arlington, TX
G	23	Amber Long (W)	5 ft 9 in (1.75 m)	Jr	Robbinsville	Robbinsville, NC
G	24	Kelila Atkinson	6 ft 0 in (1.83 m)	RS Sr	Riverdale Baptist	Woodbridge, VA
G	25	Ariel Stephenson	5 ft 10 in (1.78 m)	So	Prince George	Prince George, VA
F	32	Milan Quinn	6 ft 1 in (1.85 m)	Sr	Phillip O. Berry Academy of Technology	Charlotte, NC
F	41	Elisa Penna	6 ft 3 in (1.91 m)	So	ITC F. Foscari	Bergamo, Italy
F	42	Tyra Whitehead	6 ft 3 in (1.91 m)	Fr	Cosby	Richmond, VA
F	44	Ona Udoh	6 ft 1 in (1.85 m)	Fr	Terry Sanford	Fayetteville, NC

Head coach

- Jen Hoover (Wake Forest)

Assistant coach(es)

- Mike Terry (Western Ontario)
- Gayle Coats Fulks (Fairleigh Dickinson)
- Dane Sparrow (UNC Greensboro)

Legend

- (C) Team captain
- (S) Suspended
- (I) Ineligible
- (W) Walk-on
- Injured
- Current redshirt

Roster

== Schedule ==
Date time, TV	Rank^{#}	Opponent^{#}	Result	Record	Site (attendance) city, state
Non-conference regular season
11/11/2016*; 4:00 pm		Navy	W 75–65	1–0	LJVM Coliseum (882); Winston-Salem, NC
11/13/2016*; 7:00 pm		at LSU	L 57–60	1–1	Maravich Center (1,728); Baton Rouge, LA
11/17/2016*; 7:00 pm		Rutgers	W 55–43	2–1	LJVM Coliseum (525); Winston-Salem, NC
11/20/2016*; 2:00 pm		Eastern Michigan	W 89–61	3–1	LJVM Coliseum (482); Winston-Salem, NC
11/23/2016*; 4:00 pm		Furman	W 59–52	4–1	LJVM Coliseum (407); Winston-Salem, NC
11/26/2016*; 2:00 pm		at Elon	W 78–68	5–1	Alumni Gym (716); Elon, NC
11/30/2016*; 8:00 pm		at Illinois; ACC–Big Ten Women's Challenge	W 79–70	6–1	State Farm Center (1,243); Champaign, IL
12/04/2016*; 2:00 pm		at Seton Hall	L 63–70	6–2	Walsh Gymnasium (657); South Orange, NJ
12/08/2016*; 7:00 pm		Xavier	W 58–45	7–2	LJVM Coliseum (416); Winston-Salem, NC
12/10/2016*; 2:00 pm		Radford	L 60–68	7–3	LJVM Coliseum (467); Winston-Salem, NC
12/18/2016*; 2:00 pm		Samford	W 51–40	8–3	LJVM Coliseum (622); Winston-Salem, NC
12/21/2016*; 11:00 am		VCU	W 60–54	9–3	LJVM Coliseum (5,557); Winston-Salem, NC
12/31/2016*; 4:30 pm		at James Madison	L 76–83	9–4	JMU Convocation Center (3,212); Harrisonburg, VA
ACC regular season
01/05/2017; 7:00 pm, ACCN Extra		at No. 7 Notre Dame	L 72–92	9–5 (0–1)	Edmund P. Joyce Center (8,691); South Bend, IN
01/08/2017; 2:00 pm, RSN		NC State	L 50–65	9–6 (0–2)	LJVM Coliseum (469); Winston-Salem, NC
01/12/2017; 7:00 pm		Clemson	W 78–56	10–6 (1–2)	LJVM Coliseum (427); Winston-Salem, NC
01/16/2017; 1:00 pm, RSN		at No. 17 Virginia Tech	L 70–72	10–7 (1–3)	Cassell Coliseum (1,789); Blacksburg, VA
01/19/2017; 7:00 pm		at North Carolina	W 80–77	11–7 (2–3)	Carmichael Arena (1,476); Chapel Hill, NC
01/22/2017; 2:00 pm		Georgia Tech	W 70–65 ^{OT}	12–7 (3–3)	LJVM Coliseum (1,022); Winston-Salem, NC
01/26/2017; 7:00 pm		Boston College	W 71–55	13–7 (4–3)	LJVM Coliseum (427); Winston-Salem, NC
01/29/2017; 1:00 pm, RSN		at No. 14 Duke	L 43–71	13–8 (4–4)	Cameron Indoor Stadium (4,008); Durham, NC
02/02/2017; 7:00 pm, ACCN Extra		No. 16 Miami (FL)	L 56–79	13–9 (4–5)	LJVM Coliseum (419); Winston-Salem, NC
02/05/2017; 2:00 pm, ACCN Extra		Pittsburgh	W 57–48	14–9 (5–5)	LJVM Coliseum (576); Winston-Salem, NC
02/09/2017; 7:00 pm, ACCN Extra		at No. 5 Florida State	L 60–102	14–10 (5–6)	Donald L. Tucker Civic Center (2,906); Tallahassee, FL
02/12/2017; 2:00 pm, ACCN Extra		at Virginia	L 57–60 ^{OT}	14–11 (5–7)	John Paul Jones Arena (4,378); Charlottesville, VA
02/16/2017; 7:00 pm, ACCN Extra		No. 13 Duke	L 53–79	14–12 (5–8)	LJVM Coliseum (1,118); Winston-Salem, NC
02/19/2017; 2:00 pm, ESPNU		at No. 15 NC State	W 89–77	15–12 (6–8)	Reynolds Coliseum (5,500); Raleigh, NC
02/23/2017; 7:00 pm, ACCN Extra		at No. 20 Syracuse	L 64–85	15–13 (6–9)	Carrier Dome (1,852); Syracuse, NY
02/26/2017; 2:00 pm, ACCN Extra		No. 14 Louisville	L 46–75	15–14 (6–10)	LJVM Coliseum (1,297); Winston-Salem, NC
ACC Women's Tournament
03/02/2017; 2:00 pm, RSN	(9)	vs. (8) Virginia; Second Round	L 44–61	15–15	HTC Center (2,466); Conway, SC
WNIT
03/16/2017*; 7:00 pm		Bethune-Cookman; First Round	W 71–42	16–15	LJVM Coliseum (830); Winston-Salem, NC
03/19/2017*; 3:00 pm		at Middle Tennessee; Second Round	L 66–73	16–16	Murphy Center (2,519); Murfreesboro, TN
*Non-conference game. ^{#}Rankings from AP Poll. (#) Tournament seedings in parentheses. All times are in Eastern.

== See also ==
- 2016–17 Wake Forest Demon Deacons men's basketball team
