= 2016–17 NC State Wolfpack women's basketball team =

Intercollegiate basketball season

2016–17 NC State Wolfpack women's basketball

NCAA Women's tournament, second round
- Conference: Atlantic Coast Conference

Ranking
- Coaches: No. 17
- AP: No. 17
- Record: 23–9 (12–4 ACC)
- Head coach: Wes Moore (4th season)
- Assistant coaches: Nikki West; Gene Hill; Lindsay Edmonds
- Home arena: Reynolds Coliseum

2016–17 ACC women's basketball standings
	Conf.				Overall
Team	W		L	PCT	W		L	PCT
No. 2 Notre Dame^{†}	15	–	1	.938	33	–	4	.892
No. 9 Duke	13	–	3	.813	28	–	6	.824
No. 10 Florida State	13	–	3	.813	28	–	7	.800
No. 13 Louisville	12	–	4	.750	29	–	8	.784
No. 17 NC State	12	–	4	.750	23	–	9	.719
No. 21 Syracuse	11	–	5	.688	22	–	11	.667
No. 16 Miami (FL)	10	–	6	.625	24	–	9	.727
Virginia	7	–	9	.438	20	–	13	.606
Wake Forest	6	–	10	.375	16	–	16	.500
Georgia Tech	5	–	11	.313	22	–	14	.611
Virginia Tech	4	–	12	.250	20	–	14	.588
Pittsburgh	4	–	12	.250	13	–	17	.433
Clemson	3	–	13	.188	15	–	16	.484
North Carolina	3	–	13	.188	15	–	16	.484
Boston College	2	–	14	.125	9	–	21	.300
† 2017 ACC tournament winner As of March 29, 2017; Rankings from AP poll

The 2016–17 NC State Wolfpack women's basketball team represented North Carolina State University during the 2016–17 NCAA Division I women's basketball season. The Wolfpack, led by fourth-year head coach Wes Moore, returned to play their home games at Reynolds Coliseum after a year of renovation. They were members of the Atlantic Coast Conference. They finished the season 23–9, 12–4 in ACC play to finish in a tie for fourth place. They lost in the quarterfinals of the ACC women's tournament to Louisville. They received an at-large bid to the NCAA women's tournament, where they defeated Auburn in the first round before losing to Texas in the second round.

== Roster ==
2016–17 NC State Wolfpack women's basketball team
Players
Coaches

Pos.	#	Name	Height	Year	Previous school	Hometown
G	0	Camille Anderson	5 ft 9 in (1.75 m)	So	Buford	Buford, GA
G	1	Aislinn Konig	5 ft 9 in (1.75 m)	Fr	Brookswood Secondary	Surrey, BC
G	2	Kaila Ealey	5 ft 8 in (1.73 m)	RS Fr	Needham Broughton	Raleigh, NC
G	3	Miah Spencer	5 ft 8 in (1.73 m)	Sr	Columbia	Decatur, GA
G	4	Ashley Williams	5 ft 8 in (1.73 m)	RS Sr	Green Hope	Cary, NC
F	5	Chelsea Nelson	6 ft 1 in (1.85 m)	Jr	John Overton	Antioch, TN
F	11	Jennifer Mathurin	6 ft 1 in (1.85 m)	Sr	Champlain College State Lambert	Montreal, Quebec
G	15	Lucky Rudd	5 ft 9 in (1.75 m)	Fr	New Hope	Thomasville, NC
G	21	DD Rodgers	6 ft 1 in (1.85 m)	So	Myers Park	Charlotte, NC
G	22	Dominique Wilson	5 ft 8 in (1.73 m)	RS Sr	McEachern; Arkansas	Powder Springs, GA
G	23	Amber Richardson	6 ft 0 in (1.83 m)	So	Southeast Raleigh	Garner, NC
F	24	Erika Cassell	6 ft 2 in (1.88 m)	Fr	Holy Innocents	Marietta, GA
C	32	Akela Maize	6 ft 5 in (1.96 m)	Jr	New Hope Christian Academy	Greensboro, NC
C	44	Nae Nae Cole	6 ft 3 in (1.91 m)	So	Paul IV	Gainesville, VA

Head coach

- Wes Moore (NC State)

Assistant coach(es)

- Nikki West (Clemson)
- Gene Hill (Georgia Tech)
- Lindsay Edmonds (Appalachian State)

Legend

- (C) Team captain
- (S) Suspended
- (I) Ineligible
- (W) Walk-on
- Injured
- Current redshirt

Roster

== Media ==
WKNC was the home for Wolfpack women's basketball. Patrick Kinas and Rachel Stockdale provided call for the games. ESPN and the ACC RSN televised select Wolfpack games during the season. All non-televised home conference games were shown on ESPN3 using the radio broadcasters for the call.

== Schedule ==
Date time, TV	Rank^{#}	Opponent^{#}	Result	Record	Site (attendance) city, state
Exhibition
11/04/2016*; 7:00 pm		UNC Pembroke	W 96–54		Reynolds Coliseum (1,001); Raleigh, NC
Non-conference regular season
11/12/2016*; 6:00 pm, ACCN Extra		Wofford	W 80–40	1–0	Reynolds Coliseum (1,662); Raleigh, NC
11/16/2016*; 7:00 pm, ACCN Extra		Hampton	W 81–56	2–0	Reynolds Coliseum (1,773); Raleigh, NC
11/19/2016*; 6:00 pm, ACCN Extra		College of Charleston	W 91–47	3–0	Reynolds Coliseum (2,152); Raleigh, NC
11/21/2016*; 7:00 pm, ACCN Extra		Maryland Eastern Shore	W 77–58	4–0	Reynolds Coliseum (1,794); Raleigh, NC
11/24/2016*; 1:00 pm		vs. Kansas State; Paradise Jam tournament Island Division	L 50–67	4–1	Sports and Fitness Center; Saint Thomas, USVI
11/25/2016*; 3:15 pm		vs. UTEP; Paradise Jam Tournament Island Division	W 71–55	5–1	Sports and Fitness Center (132); Saint Thomas, USVI
11/26/2016*; 1:00 pm		vs. LSU; Paradise Jam Tournament Island Division	L 58–59	5–2	Sports and Fitness Center; Saint Thomas, USVI
12/01/2016*; 7:00 pm, ACCN Extra		Indiana; ACC–Big Ten Women's Challenge	W 84–70	6–2	Reynolds Coliseum (2,203); Raleigh, NC
12/04/2016*; 2:00 pm, ACCN Extra		North Florida	W 78–52	7–2	Reynolds Coliseum (1,701); Raleigh, NC
12/11/2016*; 2:00 pm, ACCN Extra		UNC Wilmington	W 86–54	8–2	Reynolds Coliseum (2,093); Raleigh, NC
12/14/2016*; 7:00 pm, ACCN Extra		North Carolina Central	W 83–33	9–2	Reynolds Coliseum (1,947); Raleigh, NC
12/17/2016*; 1:00 pm		at Tulane	L 58–63	9–3	Devlin Fieldhouse (726); New Orleans, LA
12/19/2016*; 6:30 pm		at South Alabama	W 74–31	10–3	Mitchell Center; Mobile, AL
ACC regular season
12/29/2016; 7:00 pm, ACCN Extra		No. 2 Notre Dame	W 70–62	11–3 (1–0)	Reynolds Coliseum (3,677); Raleigh, NC
01/02/2017; 7:00 pm, ACCN Extra		at No. 6 Florida State	W 70–61	12–3 (2–0)	Donald L. Tucker Center (3,059); Tallahassee, FL
01/05/2017; 7:00 pm, ACCN Extra		No. 14 Miami (FL)	L 64–67	12–4 (2–1)	Reynolds Coliseum (2,574); Raleigh, NC
01/08/2017; 2:00 pm, RSN		at Wake Forest	W 65–50	13–4 (3–1)	LJVM Coliseum (469); Winston-Salem, NC
01/12/2017; 7:00 pm, ACCN Extra	No. 23	at Syracuse	L 75–85	13–5 (3–2)	Carrier Dome (872); Syracuse, NY
01/15/2017; 3:00 pm, RSN	No. 23	No. 12 Duke	W 55–52	14–5 (4–2)	Reynolds Coliseum (4,657); Raleigh, NC
01/22/2017; 2:00 pm, ACCN Extra	No. 21	Clemson	W 65–53	15–5 (5–2)	Reynolds Coliseum (2,893); Raleigh, NC
01/26/2017; 7:00 pm, ACCN Extra	No. 18	Pittsburgh	W 55–42	16–5 (6–2)	Reynolds Coliseum (2,617); Raleigh, NC
01/29/2017; 3:00 pm, RSN	No. 18	at North Carolina; Carolina–State Game	L 70–83	16–6 (6–3)	Carmichael Auditorium (5,998); Chapel Hill, NC
02/02/2017; 7:00 pm, ACCN Extra	No. 19	at No. 9 Louisville	W 72–70 ^{OT}	17–6 (7–3)	KFC Yum! Center (8,251); Louisville, KY
02/09/2017; 7:00 pm	No. 17	at Georgia Tech	W 75–67	18–6 (8–3)	Hank McCamish Pavilion (748); Atlanta, GA
02/12/2017; 2:00 pm, ACCN Extra	No. 17	Virginia Tech	W 85–71	19–6 (9–3)	Reynolds Coliseum (4,467); Raleigh, NC
02/16/2017; 7:00 pm	No. 15	at Boston College	W 70–58	20–6 (10–3)	Conte Forum (781); Chestnut Hill, MA
02/19/2017; 2:00 pm, ESPNU	No. 15	Wake Forest	L 77–89	20–7 (10–4)	Reynolds Coliseum (5,500); Raleigh, NC
02/23/2017; 7:00 pm, RSN	No. 18	North Carolina; Carolina–State Game	W 80–60	21–7 (11–4)	Reynolds Coliseum (4,877); Raleigh, NC
02/27/2017; 2:00 pm, ACCN Extra	No. 18	at Virginia	W 59–48	22–7 (12–4)	John Paul Jones Arena (3,819); Charlottesville, VA
ACC Women's tournament
03/03/2017; 11:00 am, RSN	(4) No. 17	vs. (5) No. 14 Louisville; Quarterfinals	L 58–59	22–8	HTC Center (3,004); Conway, SC
NCAA Women's tournament
03/17/2017*; 12:00 pm, ESPN2	(6 L) No. 17	vs. (11 L) Auburn; First Round	W 62–48	23–8	Frank Erwin Center; Austin, TX
03/19/2017*; 2:30 pm, ESPN2	(6 L) No. 17	at (3 L) No. 14 Texas; Second Round	L 80–84	23–9	Frank Erwin Center (3,476); Austin, TX
*Non-conference game. ^{#}Rankings from AP Poll. (#) Tournament seedings in parentheses. L=Lexington Region. All times are in Eastern.

== Rankings ==
Regular season polls
Poll	Pre- season	Week 2	Week 3	Week 4	Week 5	Week 6	Week 7	Week 8	Week 9	Week 10	Week 11	Week 12	Week 13	Week 14	Week 15	Week 16	Week 17	Week 18	Week 19	Final
AP	RV	RV	RV	NR	NR	NR	NR	NR	RV	23	21	18	19	17	15	18	17	18	17	N/A
Coaches	RV	RV	RV	NR	NR	NR	NR	NR	23	22	21	18	19	17т	18	19	18	18	17	17

Legend
	Increase in ranking
	Decrease in ranking
	Not ranked previous week
(RV)	Received votes
