= 2016–17 Pittsburgh Panthers women's basketball team =

Intercollegiate basketball season

2016–17 Pittsburgh Panthers women's basketball
- Conference: Atlantic Coast Conference
- Record: 13–17 (4–12 ACC)
- Head coach: Suzie McConnell-Serio (4th season)
- Assistant coaches: Kathy McConnell-Miller; Carmen Bruce; Lindsay Richards
- Home arena: Petersen Events Center

2016–17 ACC women's basketball standings
| | Conf. | | | | Overall |
| Team | W | | L | PCT | W | | L | PCT |
|---|---|---|---|---|---|---|---|---|
| No. 2 Notre Dame^{†} | 15 | – | 1 | .938 | 33 | – | 4 | .892 |
| No. 9 Duke | 13 | – | 3 | .813 | 28 | – | 6 | .824 |
| No. 10 Florida State | 13 | – | 3 | .813 | 28 | – | 7 | .800 |
| No. 13 Louisville | 12 | – | 4 | .750 | 29 | – | 8 | .784 |
| No. 17 NC State | 12 | – | 4 | .750 | 23 | – | 9 | .719 |
| No. 21 Syracuse | 11 | – | 5 | .688 | 22 | – | 11 | .667 |
| No. 16 Miami (FL) | 10 | – | 6 | .625 | 24 | – | 9 | .727 |
| Virginia | 7 | – | 9 | .438 | 20 | – | 13 | .606 |
| Wake Forest | 6 | – | 10 | .375 | 16 | – | 16 | .500 |
| Georgia Tech | 5 | – | 11 | .313 | 22 | – | 14 | .611 |
| Virginia Tech | 4 | – | 12 | .250 | 20 | – | 14 | .588 |
| Pittsburgh | 4 | – | 12 | .250 | 13 | – | 17 | .433 |
| Clemson | 3 | – | 13 | .188 | 15 | – | 16 | .484 |
| North Carolina | 3 | – | 13 | .188 | 15 | – | 16 | .484 |
| Boston College | 2 | – | 14 | .125 | 9 | – | 21 | .300 |
† 2017 ACC tournament winner As of March 29, 2017; Rankings from AP poll

The 2016–17 Pittsburgh Panthers women's basketball team represented Pittsburgh University during the 2016–17 NCAA Division I women's basketball season. The Panthers, led by fourth-year head coach Suzie McConnell-Serio, played their home games at the Petersen Events Center, as fourth-year members of the Atlantic Coast Conference. They finished the season 13–17, 4–12 in ACC play to finish in a tie for eleventh place. They lost in the first round of the ACC women's tournament to North Carolina.

== 2016–17 media ==
=== Pitt Panthers Sports Network ===
The Pitt Panthers Sports Network broadcast all Panthers games on WJAS. George Von Benko provideed the play-by-play while Jen Tuscano provided the analysis. Non-televised home games were aired online via Pitt Panthers TV with the Panthers Sports Network call.

== Roster ==
2016–17 Pittsburgh Panthers women's basketball team
Players
Coaches

| Pos. | # | Name | Height | Year | Previous school | Hometown |
|---|---|---|---|---|---|---|
| G | 2 | Aysia Bugg | 5 ft 7 in (1.7 m) | Jr | Bolingbrook | Chicago, IL |
| G | 3 | Jasmine Whitney | 5 ft 9 in (1.75 m) | Fr | Paul IV | Centreville, VA |
| G | 4 | Tania Lamb | 5 ft 7 in (1.7 m) | So | Long Beach Poly | Los Angeles, CA |
| F | 5 | Kauai Bradley | 6 ft 0 in (1.83 m) | So | Marian Catholic | Chicago, IL |
| G | 10 | Cassidy Walsh | 5 ft 7 in (1.7 m) | So | Seton-La Salle | Pittsburgh, PA |
| F | 12 | Yacine Diop | 5 ft 10 in (1.78 m) | Jr | Seton-La Salle | Dakar, Senegal |
| G | 22 | Destinie Gibbs | 5 ft 11 in (1.8 m) | RS Sr | McEachern; USC | Oxford, GA |
| G | 23 | Alayna Gribble | 6 ft 0 in (1.83 m) | Fr | Norwin | Pittsburgh, PA |
| G | 24 | Madison Serio | 5 ft 6 in (1.68 m) | So | Upper St. Clair | Pittsburgh, PA |
| F | 32 | Kalista Walters | 6 ft 0 in (1.83 m) | So | Bethlehem Catholic | Fleetwood, PA |
| F | 44 | Brandi Harvey-Carr | 6 ft 4 in (1.93 m) | Sr | Leap Academy; DePaul | Camden, NJ |
| G/F | 50 | Brenna Wise | 6 ft 11 in (2.11 m) | Fr | Vincentian Academy | Pittsburgh, PA |

Head coach

- Suzie McConnell-Serio (Penn State)

Assistant coach(es)

- Kathy McConnell-Miller (Virginia)
- Carmen Bruce (Duquesne)
- Lindsay Richards (Iowa)

Legend

- (C) Team captain
- (S) Suspended
- (I) Ineligible
- (W) Walk-on
- Injured
- Current redshirt

Roster

== Schedule ==
| Date time, TV | Rank^{#} | Opponent^{#} | Result | Record | Site (attendance) city, state |
Exhibition
| 11/06/2016*; 2:00 pm | | Indiana (PA) | W 72–40 | | Peterson Events Center (670); Pittsburgh, PA |
Non-conference regular season
| 11/12/2016*; 2:00 pm, ACCN Extra | | Mount St. Mary's | W 89–54 | 1–0 | Peterson Events Center (589); Pittsburgh, PA |
| 11/14/2016*; 11:00 am, ACCN Extra | | Youngstown State | W 63–50 | 2–0 | Peterson Events Center (9,771); Pittsburgh, PA |
| 11/17/2016*; 7:00 pm, ACCN Extra | | Loyola–Chicago | W 59–35 | 3–0 | Peterson Events Center (516); Pittsburgh, PA |
| 11/21/2016*; 7:00 pm, ACCN Extra | | Loyola (MD) | W 74–44 | 4–0 | Peterson Events Center (651); Pittsburgh, PA |
| 11/23/2016*; 2:00 pm, ACCN Extra | | Slippery Rock | W 94–48 | 5–0 | Peterson Events Center (646); Pittsburgh, PA |
| 11/26/2016*; 6:00 pm, ACCN Extra | | Cornell | W 56–44 | 6–0 | Peterson Events Center (717); Pittsburgh, PA |
| 11/30/2016*; 7:00 pm, ACCN Extra | | Purdue; ACC–Big Ten Women's Challenge | L 61–67 | 6–1 | Peterson Events Center (702); Pittsburgh, PA |
| 12/04/2016*; 2:00 pm, ACCN Extra | | Charlotte | L 63–70 | 6–2 | Peterson Events Center (825); Pittsburgh, PA |
| 12/06/2016*; 7:00 pm, ACCN Extra | | Bryant | W 76–60 | 7–2 | Peterson Events Center (517); Pittsburgh, PA |
| 12/10/2016*; 2:00 pm | | at Penn State | L 62–91 | 7–3 | Bryce Jordan Center (2,522); University Park, PA |
| 12/19/2016*; 5:00 pm | | vs. UTEP; Patrick Harrington Tournament | W 71–46 | 8–3 | The Arena at NWFSC; Niceville, FL |
| 12/20/2016*; 5:00 pm | | vs. McNeese State; Patrick Harrington Tournament | W 71–65 | 9–3 | The Arena at NWFSC (498); Niceville, FL |
| 12/29/2016*; 2:00 pm | | at Duquesne; City Game | L 54–63 | 9–4 | Palumbo Center (1,724); Pittsburgh, PA |
ACC regular season
| 01/02/2017; 7:00 pm, ACCN Extra | | Miami (FL) | L 50–82 | 9–5 (0–1) | Peterson Events Center (904); Pittsburgh, PA |
| 01/05/2017; 7:00 pm, RSN | | Boston College | W 56–43 | 10–5 (1–1) | Peterson Events Center (538); Pittsburgh, PA |
| 01/08/2017; 4:00 pm, RSN | | at No. 8 Louisville | L 52–73 | 10–6 (1–2) | KFC Yum! Center (8,039); Louisville, KY |
| 01/12/2017; 7:00 pm, ACCN Extra | | at No. 6 Notre Dame | L 54–86 | 10–7 (1–3) | Edmund P. Joyce Center (8,137); South Bend, IN |
| 01/15/2017; 2:00 pm, ACCN Extra | | North Carolina | W 68–48 | 11–7 (2–3) | Peterson Events Center (1,879); Pittsburgh, PA |
| 01/22/2017; 12:30 pm, RSN | | Virginia | W 62–54 | 12–7 (3–3) | Peterson Events Center (2,224); Pittsburgh, PA |
| 01/26/2017; 7:00 pm, ACCN Extra | | at No. 18 NC State | L 42–55 | 12–8 (3–4) | Reynolds Center (2,617); Raleigh, NC |
| 01/29/2017; 2:00 pm, ACCN Extra | | No. 9 Louisville | L 48–63 | 12–9 (3–5) | Peterson Events Center (3,152); Pittsburgh, PA |
| 02/02/2017; 7:00 pm, ACCN Extra | | at No. 24 Syracuse | L 65–93 | 12–10 (3–6) | Carrier Dome (942); Syracuse, NY |
| 02/05/2017; 2:00 pm, ACCN Extra | | at Wake Forest | L 48–57 | 12–11 (3–7) | LJVM Coliseum (576); Winston-Salem, NC |
| 02/09/2017; 6:30 pm, RSN | | Clemson | L 46–54 | 12–12 (3–8) | Peterson Events Center (652); Pittsburgh, PA |
| 02/12/2017; 2:00 pm, ACCN Extra | | at No. 14 Duke | L 48–62 | 12–13 (3–9) | Cameron Indoor Stadium (4,013); Durham, NC |
| 02/16/2017; 7:00 pm, ACCN Extra | | Virginia Tech | W 72–64 | 13–13 (3–10) | Peterson Events Center (787); Pittsburgh, PA |
| 02/19/2017; 2:00 pm, ACCN Extra | | at Georgia Tech | L 57–71 | 13–14 (4–10) | Hank McCamish Pavilion (1,039); Atlanta, GA |
| 02/23/2017; 7:00 pm, ACCN Extra | | at No. 8 Florida State | L 48–79 | 13–15 (4–11) | Donald L. Tucker Civic Center (4,595); Tallahassee, FL |
| 02/26/2017; 2:00 pm, ACCN Extra | | No. 20 Syracuse | L 57–73 | 13–16 (4–12) | Peterson Events Center (4,212); Pittsburgh, PA |
ACC Women's Tournament
| 03/01/2017; 6:30 pm, RSN | | vs. North Carolina; First Round | L 60–72 | 13–17 | HTC Center (2,475); Conway, SC |
*Non-conference game. ^{#}Rankings from AP Poll. (#) Tournament seedings in parentheses. All times are in Eastern.

== Rankings ==
Regular season polls
| Poll | Pre- season | Week 2 | Week 3 | Week 4 | Week 5 | Week 6 | Week 7 | Week 8 | Week 9 | Week 10 | Week 11 | Week 12 | Week 13 | Week 14 | Week 15 | Week 16 | Week 17 | Week 18 | Week 19 | Final |
|---|---|---|---|---|---|---|---|---|---|---|---|---|---|---|---|---|---|---|---|---|
| AP | NR | NR | NR | NR | NR | NR | NR | NR | | | | | | | | | | | | N/A |
| Coaches | NR | NR | NR | RV | NR | NR | NR | NR | | | | | | | | | | | | |

Legend
| | Increase in ranking |
| | Decrease in ranking |
| | Not ranked previous week |
| (RV) | Received votes |
