= 2016–17 Duke Blue Devils women's basketball team =

Intercollegiate basketball season

2016–17 Duke Blue Devils women's basketball

NCAA Women's Tournament, second round
- Conference: Atlantic Coast Conference

Ranking
- Coaches: No. 9
- AP: No. 9
- Record: 28–6 (13–3 ACC)
- Head coach: Joanne P. McCallie (10th season)
- Assistant coaches: Al Brown; Rene Haynes; Hernando Planells
- Home arena: Cameron Indoor Stadium

2016–17 ACC women's basketball standings
	Conf.				Overall
Team	W		L	PCT	W		L	PCT
No. 2 Notre Dame^{†}	15	–	1	.938	33	–	4	.892
No. 9 Duke	13	–	3	.813	28	–	6	.824
No. 10 Florida State	13	–	3	.813	28	–	7	.800
No. 13 Louisville	12	–	4	.750	29	–	8	.784
No. 17 NC State	12	–	4	.750	23	–	9	.719
No. 21 Syracuse	11	–	5	.688	22	–	11	.667
No. 16 Miami (FL)	10	–	6	.625	24	–	9	.727
Virginia	7	–	9	.438	20	–	13	.606
Wake Forest	6	–	10	.375	16	–	16	.500
Georgia Tech	5	–	11	.313	22	–	14	.611
Virginia Tech	4	–	12	.250	20	–	14	.588
Pittsburgh	4	–	12	.250	13	–	17	.433
Clemson	3	–	13	.188	15	–	16	.484
North Carolina	3	–	13	.188	15	–	16	.484
Boston College	2	–	14	.125	9	–	21	.300
† 2017 ACC tournament winner As of March 29, 2017; Rankings from AP poll

The 2016–17 Duke Blue Devils women's basketball team represented Duke University during the 2016–17 NCAA Division I women's basketball season. Returning as head coach was Joanne P. McCallie entering her 10th season. The team plays its home games at Cameron Indoor Stadium in Durham, North Carolina as members of the Atlantic Coast Conference. They finished the season 28–6, 13–3 in ACC play to finish in a tie for second place. They advanced to the championship game of the ACC women's tournament where they lost to Notre Dame. They received an at-large bid to the NCAA women's tournament where they defeated Hampton in the first round before getting upset by Oregon in the second round.

== 2016–17 media ==
All Blue Devils games will air on the Blue Devil IMG Sports Network. WDNC will once again act as the main station for the Blue Devils IMG Sports Network games with Steve Barnes providing the play-by-play and Morgan Patrick acting as analyst.

== Roster ==
2016–17 Duke Blue Devils women's basketball team
Players
Coaches

Pos.	#	Name	Height	Year	Previous school	Hometown
G	2	Haley Gorecki	6 ft 0 in (1.83 m)	So	William Fremd	Palatine, IL
G	4	Lexie Brown	5 ft 9 in (1.75 m)	RS Jr	North Gwinnett; Maryland	Suwanee, GA
F	5	Leaonna Odom	6 ft 2 in (1.88 m)	Fr	Chaminade	Lompoc, CA
C	11	Sofia Roma (I) (redshirt)	6 ft 2 in (1.88 m)	So	Nazareth Regional; Wagner	Richmond Hill, NY
G	13	Crystal Primm	5 ft 11 in (1.8 m)	So	Oxbridge Academy	West Palm Beach, FL
G/F	14	Faith Suggs	6 ft 1 in (1.85 m)	So	Homewood Flossmoor	Flossmoor, IL
G	15	Kyra Lambert	5 ft 9 in (1.75 m)	So	Samuel Clemens	Cibolo, TX
F	22	Oderah Chidom	6 ft 4 in (1.93 m)	Sr	Bishop O'Dowd	Oakland, CA
G	23	Rebecca Greenwell	6 ft 1 in (1.85 m)	RS Jr	Owensboro Catholic	Owensboro, KY
C	30	Emily Schubert	6 ft 4 in (1.93 m)	Fr	Elizabethton	Elizabethton, TN
F/C	34	Lyneé Belton	6 ft 3 in (1.91 m)	RS So	The Bullis School	Clinton, MD
F/C	35	Erin Mathias	6 ft 4 in (1.93 m)	Jr	Fox Chapel Area	Pittsburgh, PA

Head coach

- Joanne P. McCallie (Northwestern)

Assistant coach(es)

- Al Brown (Purdue)
- Rene Haynes (Michigan State)
- Hernando Planells (Regis)

Legend

- (C) Team captain
- (S) Suspended
- (I) Ineligible
- (W) Walk-on
- Injured
- Current redshirt

Roster

== Rankings ==
2016–17 NCAA Division I women's basketball rankings

Regular season polls
Poll	Pre- Season	Week 2	Week 3	Week 4	Week 5	Week 6	Week 7	Week 8	Week 9	Week 10	Week 11	Week 12	Week 13	Week 14	Week 15	Week 16	Week 17	Week 18	Week 19	Final
AP	RV	RV	RV	RV	21	18	17	15	13	12	15	14	15	14	13	13	13	9	9	N/A
Coaches	RV	RV	RV	RV	21	20	18	17	15	15	16т	15	15	15	14	13	11	9	9	

Legend
	Increase in ranking
	Decrease in ranking
	No change
(RV)	Received votes
(NR)	Not ranked

== Schedule ==
Date time, TV	Rank^{#}	Opponent^{#}	Result	Record	High points	High rebounds	High assists	Site (attendance) city, state
Exhibition
11/06/2016*; 6:00 pm		Charleston (WV)	W 129–46		27 – Greenwell	8 – Tied	7 – Greenwell	Cameron Indoor Stadium; Durham, NC
Non-conference regular season
11/11/2016*; 7:00 pm, ESPN3		at Liberty	W 98–38	1–0	28 – Greenwell	10 – Mathias	5 – Tied	Vines Center (3,741); Lynchburg, VA
11/13/2016*; 2:00 pm, ACCN Extra		Penn	W 68–55	2–0	20 – Brown	14 – Chidom	4 – Chidom	Cameron Indoor Stadium (3,263); Durham, NC
11/15/2016*; 7:00 pm		Longwood	W 105–48	3–0	30 – Greenwell	8 – Cooper	7 – Brown	Cameron Indoor Stadium (3,007); Durham, NC
11/17/2016*; 7:00 pm, ACCN Extra		Grand Canyon	W 90–47	4–0	18 – Chidom	10 – Greenwell	4 – Tied	Cameron Indoor Stadium (3,040); Durham, NC
11/20/2016*; 2:00 pm		at Vanderbilt	L 73–77	4–1	21 – Brown	8 – Chidom	7 – Lambert	Memorial Gymnasium (2,841); Nashville, TN
11/22/2016*; 7:00 pm, ACCN Extra		Old Dominion	W 92–64	5–1	32 – Brown	6 – Tied	8 – Lambert	Cameron Indoor Stadium (3,136); Durham, NC
11/25/2016*; 10:00 pm		at Long Beach State	W 83–46	6–1	17 – Brown	12 – Chidom	5 – Lambert	Walter Pyramid (1,057); Long Beach, CA
11/27/2016*; 4:00 pm		at Pepperdine	W 99–65	7–1	31 – Greenwell	10 – Odom	12 – Brown	Firestone Fieldhouse (303); Malibu, CA
12/01/2016*; 7:00 pm		at Rutgers; ACC–Big Ten Women's Challenge	W 68–32	8–1	11 – Greenwell	7 – Tied	5 – Greenwell	Louis Brown Athletic Center (2,704); Piscataway, NJ
12/04/2016*; 2:00 pm, ACCN Extra		No. 3 South Carolina	W 74–63	9–1	29 – Greenwell	8 – Chidom	2 – Tied	Cameron Indoor Stadium (6,036); Durham, NC
12/08/2016*; 7:00 pm, ACCN Extra	No. 21	Elon	W 68–61	10–1	25 – Brown	8 – Cooper	2 – 4 tied	Cameron Indoor Stadium (3,121); Durham, NC
12/21/2016*; 7:00 pm, ACCN Extra	No. 17	Villanova	W 68–50	11–1	18 – Tied	9 – Greenwell	3 – 3 tied	Cameron Indoor Stadium (3,377); Durham, NC
12/29/2016*; 7:00 pm, ACCN Extra	No. 15	No. 17 Kentucky	W 69–54	12–1	24 – Brown	10 – Greenwell	5 – Greenwell	Cameron Indoor Stadium (4,121); Durham, NC
ACC Regular Season
01/02/2017; 7:00 pm, ESPNU	No. 13	No. 8 Louisville	W 58–55	13–1 (1–0)	17 – Brown	6 – Tied	4 – Brown	Cameron Indoor Stadium (3,309); Durham, NC
01/05/2017; 7:00 pm	No. 13	at Georgia Tech	W 75–68	14–1 (2–0)	25 – Brown	7 – Cooper	4 – Tied	Hank McCamish Pavilion (743); Atlanta, GA
01/08/2017; 3:00 pm, ACCN Extra	No. 13	at No. 6 Florida State	L 45–69	14–2 (2–1)	12 – Lambert	6 – 3 tied	2 – Lambert	Donald L. Tucker Center (6,687); Tallahassee, FL
01/12/2017; 7:00 pm, ACCN Extra	No. 12	North Carolina	W 70–58	15–2 (3–1)	15 – Odom	8 – Cooper	3 – Tied	Cameron Indoor Stadium (6,718); Durham, NC
01/15/2017; 3:00 pm, RSN	No. 12	at No. 23 NC State	L 52–55	15–3 (3–2)	11 – Greenwell	7 – Greenwell	5 – Greenwell	Reynolds Coliseum (4,657); Raleigh, NC
01/19/2017; 7:00 pm, ACCN Extra	No. 15	No. 17 Virginia Tech	W 84–59	16–3 (4–2)	29 – Brown	6 – Tied	4 – Tied	Cameron Indoor Stadium (3,755); Durham, NC
01/22/2017; 2:00 pm, ACCN Extra	No. 15	at Boston College	W 67–44	17–3 (5–2)	22 – Brown	7 – Chidom	6 – Mathias	Conte Forum (1,374); Chestnut Hill, MA
01/26/2017; 7:00 pm, ACCN Extra	No. 14	at No. 8 Notre Dame	L 58–62	17–4 (5–3)	22 – Brown	7 – Tied	4 – Tied	Edmund P. Joyce Center (8,309); South Bend, IN
01/29/2017; 1:00 pm, RSN	No. 14	Wake Forest	W 71–43	18–4 (6–3)	28 – Brown	11 – Odom	5 – Lambert	Cameron Indoor Stadium (4,008); Durham, NC
02/02/2017; 7:00 pm, ACCN Extra	No. 15	Clemson	W 65–37	19–4 (7–3)	21 – Greenwell	5 – Tied	7 – Brown	Cameron Indoor Stadium (3,564); Durham, NC
02/05/2017; 1:00 pm, RSN	No. 15	at Virginia	W 70–51	20–4 (8–3)	21 – Greenwell	6 – Greenwell	5 – Lambert	John Paul Jones Arena (4,361); Charlottesville, VA
02/10/2017; 7:00 pm, ACCN Extra	No. 14	No. 20 Syracuse	W 72–55	21–4 (9–3)	18 – Greenwell	10 – Greenwell	8 – Brown	Cameron Indoor Stadium (3,809); Durham, NC
02/12/2017; 2:00 pm, ACCN Extra	No. 14	Pittsburgh	W 62–48	22–4 (10–3)	18 – Brown	9 – Odom	4 – Brown	Cameron Indoor Stadium (4,013); Durham, NC
02/16/2017; 7:00 pm, ACCN Extra	No. 13	at Wake Forest	W 79–53	23–4 (11–3)	24 – Brown	8 – Chidom	7 – Brown	LJVM Coliseum (1,118); Winston-Salem, NC
02/19/2017; 1:00 pm, RSN	No. 13	No. 16 Miami (FL)	W 83–70	24–4 (12–3)	28 – Brown	13 – Greenwell	4 – Tied	Cameron Indoor Stadium (4,153); Durham, NC
02/26/2017; 3:00 pm, RSN	No. 13	at North Carolina	W 95–71	25–4 (13–3)	30 – Greenwell	7 – Tied	13 – Lambert	Carmichael Auditorium (4,221); Chapel Hill, NC
ACC Women's Tournament
03/03/2017; 8:00 pm, RSN	(3) No. 13	vs. (6) No. 21 Syracuse; Quarterfinals	W 68–46	26–4	22 – Brown	9 – Lambert	4 – Brown	HTC Center (3,600); Conway, SC
03/03/2017; 2:30 pm, ESPNU	(3) No. 13	vs. (7) No. 16 Miami (FL); Semifinals	W 57–52	27–4	20 – Brown	8 – Brown	4 – Brown	HTC Center (3,600); Conway, SC
03/03/2017; 1:00 pm, ESPN2	(3) No. 13	vs. (1) No. 3 Notre Dame; Championship Game	L 61–84	27–5	16 – Brown	5 – Tied	3 – Tied	HTC Center (3,600); Conway, SC
NCAA Women's Tournament
03/18/2017*; 9:00 pm, ESPN2	(2 B) No. 9	(15 B) Hampton; First Round	W 94–31	28–5	26 – Greenwell	10 – Greenwell	9 – Brown	Cameron Indoor Stadium (2,328); Durham, NC
03/20/2017*; 6:30 pm, ESPN2	(2 B) No. 9	(10 B) Oregon; Second Round	L 65–70	28–6	25 – Brown	9 – Tied	6 – Brown	Cameron Indoor Stadium (1,620); Durham, NC
*Non-conference game. ^{#}Rankings from AP Poll,. (#) Tournament seedings in parentheses. B=Bridgeport Region. All times are in Eastern Time.

== See also ==
- 2016–17 Duke Blue Devils men's basketball team
