= 2016–17 Syracuse Orange women's basketball team =

Intercollegiate basketball season

2016–17 Syracuse Orange women's basketball

NCAA tournament, second round
- Conference: Atlantic Coast Conference

Ranking
- Coaches: No. 22
- AP: No. 21
- Record: 22–11 (11–5 ACC)
- Head coach: Quentin Hillsman (10th season)
- Assistant coaches: Vonn Read; Tammi Reiss; Cedric Solice
- Home arena: Carrier Dome

2016–17 ACC women's basketball standings
	Conf.				Overall
Team	W		L	PCT	W		L	PCT
No. 2 Notre Dame^{†}	15	–	1	.938	33	–	4	.892
No. 9 Duke	13	–	3	.813	28	–	6	.824
No. 10 Florida State	13	–	3	.813	28	–	7	.800
No. 13 Louisville	12	–	4	.750	29	–	8	.784
No. 17 NC State	12	–	4	.750	23	–	9	.719
No. 21 Syracuse	11	–	5	.688	22	–	11	.667
No. 16 Miami (FL)	10	–	6	.625	24	–	9	.727
Virginia	7	–	9	.438	20	–	13	.606
Wake Forest	6	–	10	.375	16	–	16	.500
Georgia Tech	5	–	11	.313	22	–	14	.611
Virginia Tech	4	–	12	.250	20	–	14	.588
Pittsburgh	4	–	12	.250	13	–	17	.433
Clemson	3	–	13	.188	15	–	16	.484
North Carolina	3	–	13	.188	15	–	16	.484
Boston College	2	–	14	.125	9	–	21	.300
† 2017 ACC tournament winner As of March 29, 2017; Rankings from AP poll

The 2016–17 Syracuse Orange women's basketball team represented Syracuse University during the 2016–17 NCAA Division I women's basketball season. The Orange, led by tenth-year head coach Quentin Hillsman. The Orange were fourth-year members of the Atlantic Coast Conference, and played their home games at the Carrier Dome. They finished the season 22–11, 11–5 in ACC play to finish in sixth place. They advanced to the quarterfinals round of the ACC women's tournament, where they lost to Duke. They received an at-large bid to the NCAA women's tournament, where they defeated Iowa State in the first round before losing to last year's National Championship rematch to Connecticut in the second round.

== Roster ==
2016–17 Syracuse Orange women's basketball team
Players
Coaches

Pos.	#	Name	Height	Year	Previous school	Hometown
G	1	Alexis Peterson	5 ft 7 in (1.7 m)	Sr	Northland	Columbus, OH
G	2	Chelayne Bailey	5 ft 6 in (1.68 m)	Fr	Pickering	Pickering, ON
F	3	Julia Chandler	6 ft 2 in (1.88 m)	So	Northern Secondary	Toronto, ON
G	5	Jade Phillips	5 ft 11 in (1.8 m)	So	Southeast Raleigh	Raleigh, NC
F	10	Isabella Slim	6 ft 0 in (1.83 m)	Sr	CTO Amsterdam	Amsterdam, Netherlands
G	11	Gabrielle Cooper	5 ft 10 in (1.78 m)	Fr	Morgan Park	Lansing, IL
G	20	Brittney Sykes	5 ft 9 in (1.75 m)	RS Sr	University	Newark, NJ
G	21	Danielle Elmore	5 ft 9 in (1.75 m)	Fr	Capital Prep	Hartford, CT
G	22	Caroline Rowe	5 ft 8 in (1.73 m)	Fr	Holy Child	Gaithersburg, MD
G	24	Brandi Fowler	5 ft 4 in (1.63 m)	So	Corcoran	Syracuse, NY
F	32	Miranda Drummond (I) (redshirt)	6 ft 1 in (1.85 m)	Fr	Harpursville; St. Bonaventure	Binghamton, NY
G	33	Davida Dale	5 ft 9 in (1.75 m)	RS Fr	St. Andrew's	Providence, RI
G	34	Abby Grant	5 ft 9 in (1.75 m)	So	St. Francis	Suwanee, GA
G	44	Jasmine Nwajei (I) (redshirt)	5 ft 8 in (1.73 m)	Sr	Murry Bergtraum; Wagner	Rockaway Park, NJ
C	50	Briana Day	6 ft 4 in (1.93 m)	Sr	Millbrook	Raleigh, NC
F	55	Bria Day	6 ft 4 in (1.93 m)	Sr	Millbrook	Raleigh, NC

Head coach

- Quentin Hillsman (St. Mary's (MD))

Assistant coach(es)

- Vonn Read (Clark Atlanta)
- Adeniyi Amadou (Indiana (PA))
- Tammi Reiss (Virginia)

Legend

- (C) Team captain
- (S) Suspended
- (I) Ineligible
- (W) Walk-on
- Injured
- Current redshirt

Roster

== Schedule ==
Date time, TV	Rank^{#}	Opponent^{#}	Result	Record	Site (attendance) city, state
Non-conference regular season
11/11/2016*; 3:00 pm, ACCN Extra	No. 14	Rhode Island	W 95–49	1–0	Carrier Dome (1,230); Syracuse, NY
11/14/2016*; 7:00 pm, ACCN Extra	No. 14	Siena	W 102–65	2–0	Carrier Dome (727); Syracuse, NY
11/18/2016*; 7:00 pm, ESPN3	No. 14	at Stony Brook	W 78–60	3–0	Island Federal Credit Union Arena (1,103); Stony Brook, NY
11/21/2016*; 7:00 pm	No. 11	at Drexel	L 61–62	3–1	Daskalakis Athletic Center (762); Philadelphia, PA
11/25/2016*; 7:30 pm	No. 11	vs. George Washington; Gulf Coast Showcase quarterfinals	W 64–61	4–1	Germain Arena; Estero, FL
11/26/2016*; 7:30 pm	No. 11	vs. No. 8 Ohio State; Gulf Coast Showcase semifinals	L 72–77	4–2	Germain Arena; Estero, FL
11/27/2016*; 5:00 pm	No. 11	vs. No. 18 DePaul; Gulf Coast Showcase 3rd place game	L 84–108	4–3	Germain Arena; Estero, FL
11/30/2016*; 7:00 pm, ACCN Extra	No. 20	Michigan State; ACC–Big Ten Women's Challenge	W 75–64	5–3	Carrier Dome (768); Syracuse, NY
12/04/2016*; 2:00 pm, ACCN Extra	No. 20	Central Connecticut	W 95–63	6–3	Carrier Dome (935); Syracuse, NY
12/07/2016*; 11:00 am, ACCN Extra	No. 20	Coppin State	W 76–30	7–3	Carrier Dome (3,932); Syracuse, NY
12/10/2016*; 1:00 pm, ACCN Extra	No. 20	Niagara	W 109–60	8–3	Carrier Dome (1,072); Syracuse, NY
12/20/2016*; 3:15 pm	No. 19	vs. Old Dominion; Florida Sunshine Classic	W 92–66	9–3	Worden Arena (335); Winter Haven, FL
12/21/2016*; 3:15 pm	No. 19	vs. Texas A&M; Florida Sunshine Classic	L 84–105	9–4	Worden Arena (418); Winter Haven, FL
ACC regular season
12/29/2016; 7:00 pm, ACCN Extra	No. 25	at No. 8 Louisville	L 76–91	9–5 (0–1)	KFC Yum! Center (8,586); Louisville, KY
01/02/2017; 7:00 pm, ACCN Extra		Virginia	W 54–49	10–5 (1–1)	Carrier Dome (938); Syracuse, NY
01/05/2017; 7:00 pm, ACCN Extra		at Clemson	W 88–62	11–5 (2–1)	Littlejohn Coliseum (233); Clemson, SC
01/08/2017; 2:00 pm, ACCN Extra		Boston College	W 79–52	12–5 (3–1)	Carrier Dome (1,614); Syracuse, NY
01/12/2017; 7:00 pm, ACCN Extra		No. 23 NC State	W 85–75	13–5 (3–2)	Carrier Dome (872); Syracuse, NY
01/15/2017; 7:00 pm, RSN		at Georgia Tech	L 66–75	13–6 (4–2)	Hank McCamish Pavilion (1,152); Atlanta, GA
01/19/2017; 7:00 pm, ACCN Extra		at No. 7 Florida State	L 58–77	13–7 (4–3)	Donald L. Tucker Civic Center (3,716); Tallahassee, FL
01/22/2017; 2:30 pm, RSN		No. 14 Miami (FL)	W 81–48	14–7 (5–3)	Carrier Dome (1,900); Syracuse, NY
01/29/2017; 2:00 pm, ACCN Extra		at No. 19 Virginia Tech	W 82–72	15–7 (6–3)	Cassell Coliseum (2,033); Blacksburg, VA
02/02/2017; 7:00 pm, ACCN Extra	No. 24	Pittsburgh	W 93–65	16–7 (7–3)	Carrier Dome (942); Syracuse, NY
02/05/2017; 2:00 pm, ACCN Extra	No. 24	at Boston College	W 72–45	17–7 (8–3)	Conte Forum (947); Chestnut Hill, MA
02/10/2017; 7:00 pm, ACCN Extra	No. 20	at No. 14 Duke	L 55–72	17–8 (8–4)	Cameron Indoor Stadium (3,809); Durham, NC
02/12/2017; 3:00 pm, RSN	No. 20	North Carolina	W 95–64	18–8 (9–4)	Carrier Dome (1,595); Syracuse, NY
02/19/2017; 5:00 pm, ESPN2	No. 21	No. 7 Notre Dame	L 80–85	18–9 (9–5)	Carrier Dome (11,021); Syracuse, NY
02/23/2017; 7:00 pm, ACCN Extra	No. 20	Wake Forest	W 85–64	19–9 (10–5)	Carrier Dome (1,852); Syracuse, NY
02/26/2017; 2:00 pm, ACCN Extra	No. 20	at Pittsburgh	W 73–57	20–9 (11–5)	Petersen Events Center (4,212); Pittsburgh, PA
ACC Women's Tournament
03/02/2017; 8:00 pm, RSN	(6) No. 21	vs. (14) North Carolina; Second Round	W 83–64	21–9	HTC Center (3,145); Conway, SC
03/03/2017; 8:00 pm, RSN	(6) No. 21	vs. (3) No. 13 Duke; Quarterfinals	L 46–68	21–10	HTC Center (3,600); Conway, SC
NCAA Women's Tournament
03/18/2017*; 1:30 pm, ESPN2	(8 B) No. 21	vs. (9 B) Iowa State; First Round	W 85–65	22–10	Gampel Pavilion (5,670); Storrs, CT
03/20/2017*; 6:30 pm, ESPN2	(8 B) No. 21	at (1 B) No. 1 Connecticut; Second Round	L 64–94	22–11	Gampel Pavilion (8,274); Storrs, CT
*Non-conference game. ^{#}Rankings from AP Poll. (#) Tournament seedings in parentheses. B=Bridgeport Region. All times are in Eastern.

== Rankings ==
Regular season polls
Poll	Pre- season	Week 2	Week 3	Week 4	Week 5	Week 6	Week 7	Week 8	Week 9	Week 10	Week 11	Week 12	Week 13	Week 14	Week 15	Week 16	Week 17	Week 18	Week 19	Final
AP	14	14	11т	20	20	21	19	25	RV	RV	RV	RV	24	20	21	20	21	21	21	N/A
Coaches	13	14	18	21	19	18	16	21	25	24	24	24	21	19	21	21	20	21	21	22

Legend
	Increase in ranking
	Decrease in ranking
	Not ranked previous week
(RV)	Received votes

== See also ==
- 2016–17 Syracuse Orange men's basketball team
