= 2016–17 Clemson Tigers women's basketball team =

Intercollegiate basketball season

2016–17 Clemson Tigers women's basketball
- Conference: Atlantic Coast Conference
- Record: 15–16 (3–13 ACC)
- Head coach: Audra Smith (4th season)
- Assistant coaches: Daryl Oliver; Edgar Farmer; Tiffany Sardin
- Home arena: Littlejohn Coliseum

2016–17 ACC women's basketball standings
	Conf.				Overall
Team	W		L	PCT	W		L	PCT
No. 2 Notre Dame^{†}	15	–	1	.938	33	–	4	.892
No. 9 Duke	13	–	3	.813	28	–	6	.824
No. 10 Florida State	13	–	3	.813	28	–	7	.800
No. 13 Louisville	12	–	4	.750	29	–	8	.784
No. 17 NC State	12	–	4	.750	23	–	9	.719
No. 21 Syracuse	11	–	5	.688	22	–	11	.667
No. 16 Miami (FL)	10	–	6	.625	24	–	9	.727
Virginia	7	–	9	.438	20	–	13	.606
Wake Forest	6	–	10	.375	16	–	16	.500
Georgia Tech	5	–	11	.313	22	–	14	.611
Virginia Tech	4	–	12	.250	20	–	14	.588
Pittsburgh	4	–	12	.250	13	–	17	.433
Clemson	3	–	13	.188	15	–	16	.484
North Carolina	3	–	13	.188	15	–	16	.484
Boston College	2	–	14	.125	9	–	21	.300
† 2017 ACC tournament winner As of March 29, 2017; Rankings from AP poll

The 2016–17 Clemson Tigers women's basketball team represented Clemson University during the 2016–17 college basketball season. The Tigers were led by fourth-year head coach Audra Smith. The Tigers, members of the Atlantic Coast Conference, played their home games at Littlejohn Coliseum after a one year of renovation. They finished the season 15–16, 3–13 in ACC play to finish in a tie for thirteenth place. They advance to the second round of ACC women's tournament where they lost to Louisville.

== Roster ==
2016–17 Clemson Tigers women's basketball team
Players
Coaches

Pos.	#	Name	Height	Year	Previous school	Hometown
G/F	0	Nelly Perry	5 ft 10 in (1.78 m)	Jr	Brimm Medical Arts	Camden, NJ
G	3	Victoria Cardaci	5 ft 5 in (1.65 m)	Jr	Holmdel	Holmdel, NJ
G	5	Danielle Edwards	5 ft 7 in (1.7 m)	So	McDonogh School	Perry Hall, MD
G/F	10	Francesca Tagliapietra	5 ft 9 in (1.75 m)	RS So	Liceo Scientifico Nicolo' Tron	Carrè, Italy
F	11	Siana Fields	5 ft 8 in (1.73 m)	Fr	Long Beach Poly	Long Beach, CA
G	12	Aliyah Collier	5 ft 9 in (1.75 m)	So	Laney	Augusta, GA
G	15	Jaia Alexander	5 ft 9 in (1.75 m)	Fr	Roland Park Country	Towson, MD
C	20	Sirah Diarra	6 ft 2 in (1.88 m)	So	Champlain College Saint-Lambert	Longueuil, QE
C	21	MaKayla Johnson	6 ft 4 in (1.93 m)	Jr	Dreher	Columbia, SC
G	22	Keniece Purvis	5 ft 7 in (1.7 m)	So	New Garden Friends School	Greensboro, NC
C	24	Ivy Atkism	6 ft 2 in (1.88 m)	Jr	George Walton Academy	Monroe, GA
G	33	Alexis Carter	5 ft 7 in (1.7 m)	Jr	Tigard	Portland, OR
C	44	Kobi Thornton	6 ft 2 in (1.88 m)	Fr	Randolph-Clay	Cuthbert, GA

Head coach

- Audra Smith (Virginia)

Assistant coach(es)

- Daryl Oliver (Richmond)
- Edgar Farmer (North Carolina)
- Tiffany Sardin (Virginia)

Legend

- (C) Team captain
- (S) Suspended
- (I) Ineligible
- (W) Walk-on
- Injured
- Current redshirt

Roster

== Schedule ==
Date time, TV	Rank^{#}	Opponent^{#}	Result	Record	Site (attendance) city, state
Exhibition
10/30/2016*; 2:00 pm		West Alabama	W 80–48		Littlejohn Coliseum; Clemson, SC
11/06/2016*; 2:00 pm		North Greenville	W 79–57		Littlejohn Coliseum; Clemson, SC
Non-conference regular season
11/11/2016*; 12:00 pm		Coastal Carolina	W 64–57	1–0	Littlejohn Coliseum (2,242); Clemson, SC
11/13/2016*; 2:00 pm		Western Carolina	W 78–63	2–0	Littlejohn Coliseum (361); Clemson, SC
11/16/2016*; 6:00 pm		Georgia Southern	W 58–47	3–0	Littlejohn Coliseum (368); Clemson, SC
11/19/2016*; 1:00 pm, ESPN3		at Monmouth	W 60–47	4–0	OceanFirst Bank Center (812); West Long Branch, NJ
11/22/2016*; 5:00 pm		Louisiana Tech	W 78–67 ^{OT}	5–0	Littlejohn Coliseum (254); Clemson, SC
11/24/2016*; 1:15 pm		vs. Loyola–Chicago; San Juan Shootout	W 61–40	6–0	Ocean Center; Daytona Beach, FL
11/25/2016*; 11:00 am		vs. Wright State; San Juan Shootout	W 75–51	7–0	Ocean Center (127); Daytona Beach, FL
12/02/2016*; 5:00 pm		Maine	W 69–61	8–0	Littlejohn Coliseum (299); Clemson, SC
12/12/2016*; 7:00 pm		No. 25 Oregon	L 59–87	8–1	Littlejohn Coliseum (313); Clemson, SC
12/15/2016*; 7:00 pm, SECN		at No. 6 South Carolina; Rivalry	L 61–83	8–2	Colonial Life Arena (11,916); Columbia, SC
12/18/2016*; 2:00 pm		South Carolina State	W 56–36	9–2	Littlejohn Coliseum (638); Clemson, SC
12/21/2016*; 7:00 pm		at Jacksonville State	W 69–63	10–2	Pete Mathews Coliseum (512); Jacksonville, AL
12/29/2016*; 7:00 pm		Bethune-Cookman	W 59–38	11–2	Littlejohn Coliseum (399); Clemson, SC
ACC regular season
01/02/2017; 7:00 pm, RSN		at Boston College	L 48–60	11–3 (0–1)	Conte Forum (535); Chestnut Hill, MA
01/05/2017; 7:00 pm, ACCN Extra		Syracuse	L 62–88	11–4 (0–2)	Littlejohn Coliseum (233); Clemson, SC
01/08/2017; 2:00 pm, ACCN Extra		No. 17 Virginia Tech	L 69–78	11–5 (0–3)	Littlejohn Coliseum (306); Clemson, SC
01/12/2017; 7:00 pm		at Wake Forest	L 56–78	11–6 (0–4)	LJVM Coliseum (427); Winston-Salem, NC
01/15/2017; 2:00 pm, ACCN Extra		No. 7 Florida State	L 27–86	11–7 (0–5)	Littlejohn Coliseum (832); Clemson, SC
01/19/2017; 7:00 pm, ACCN Extra		Virginia	L 37–69	11–8 (0–6)	Littlejohn Coliseum (319); Clemson, SC
01/22/2017; 2:00 pm, ACCN Extra		at No. 21 NC State	L 53–65	11–9 (0–7)	Reynolds Coliseum (2,893); Raleigh, NC
01/26/2017; 7:00 pm, ACCN Extra		No. 9 Louisville	L 46–60	11–10 (0–8)	Littlejohn Coliseum (352); Clemson, SC
01/29/2017; 2:00 pm, ACCN Extra		Georgia Tech	W 62–61	12–10 (1–8)	Littlejohn Coliseum (365); Clemson, SC
02/02/2017; 7:00 pm, ACCN Extra		at No. 15 Duke	L 37–65	12–11 (1–9)	Cameron Indoor Stadium (3,564); Durham, NC
02/05/2017; 2:00 pm, ACCN Extra		North Carolina	W 78–67	13–11 (2–9)	Littlejohn Coliseum (688); Clemson, SC
02/09/2017; 6:30 pm, RSN		at Pittsburgh	W 54–46	14–11 (3–9)	Petersen Events Center (652); Pittsburgh, PA
02/11/2017; 2:00 pm, ACCN Extra		at No. 16 Miami (FL)	L 57–81	14–12 (3–10)	Watsco Center (2,312); Coral Gables, FL
02/16/2017; 7:00 pm		No. 7 Notre Dame	L 80–84	14–13 (3–11)	Littlejohn Coliseum (595); Clemson, SC
02/18/2017; 2:00 pm, ACCN Extra		at No. 4 Florida State	L 47–80	14–14 (3–12)	Donald L. Tucker Center (3,576); Tallahassee, FL
02/23/2017; 7:00 pm		at Georgia Tech	L 58–72	14–15 (3–13)	Hank McCamish Pavilion (1,040); Atlanta, GA
ACC Women's Tournament
03/01/2017; 1:00 pm, RSN	(13)	vs. (12) Virginia Tech; First Round	W 67–66	15–15	HTC Center; Conway, SC
03/02/2017; 11:00 am, RSN	(13)	vs. (5) No. 14 Louisville; Second Round	L 46–68	15–16	HTC Center (2,613); Conway, SC
*Non-conference game. ^{#}Rankings from AP Poll. (#) Tournament seedings in parentheses. All times are in Eastern.

== Rankings ==
2016–17 NCAA Division I women's basketball rankings

Regular season polls
Poll	Pre- Season	Week 2	Week 3	Week 4	Week 5	Week 6	Week 7	Week 8	Week 9	Week 10	Week 11	Week 12	Week 13	Week 14	Week 15	Week 16	Week 17	Week 18	Final
AP	NR	NR	NR	NR	NR	NR	NR	RV	NR										
Coaches	NR	NR	NR	NR	NR	NR	NR	NR	NR										

Legend
	Increase in ranking
	Decrease in ranking
	Not ranked previous week
(RV)	Received Votes

== See also ==
- 2016–17 Clemson Tigers men's basketball team
