= 2016–17 Georgia Tech Yellow Jackets women's basketball team =

Intercollegiate basketball season

2016–17 Georgia Tech Yellow Jackets women's basketball

Junkanoo Jam Freeport Division Champions

WNIT, Runner Up
- Conference: Atlantic Coast Conference
- Record: 22–15 (5–11 ACC)
- Head coach: MaChelle Joseph (14th season)
- Assistant coaches: Kevin Morrison; Rob Norris; M. L. Willis
- Home arena: Hank McCamish Pavilion

2016–17 ACC women's basketball standings
	Conf.				Overall
Team	W		L	PCT	W		L	PCT
No. 2 Notre Dame^{†}	15	–	1	.938	33	–	4	.892
No. 9 Duke	13	–	3	.813	28	–	6	.824
No. 10 Florida State	13	–	3	.813	28	–	7	.800
No. 13 Louisville	12	–	4	.750	29	–	8	.784
No. 17 NC State	12	–	4	.750	23	–	9	.719
No. 21 Syracuse	11	–	5	.688	22	–	11	.667
No. 16 Miami (FL)	10	–	6	.625	24	–	9	.727
Virginia	7	–	9	.438	20	–	13	.606
Wake Forest	6	–	10	.375	16	–	16	.500
Georgia Tech	5	–	11	.313	22	–	14	.611
Virginia Tech	4	–	12	.250	20	–	14	.588
Pittsburgh	4	–	12	.250	13	–	17	.433
Clemson	3	–	13	.188	15	–	16	.484
North Carolina	3	–	13	.188	15	–	16	.484
Boston College	2	–	14	.125	9	–	21	.300
† 2017 ACC tournament winner As of March 29, 2017; Rankings from AP poll

The 2016–17 Georgia Tech Yellow Jackets women's basketball team represented Georgia Institute of Technology during the 2016–17 NCAA Division I women's basketball season. Returning as head coach is MaChelle Joseph entering her 14th season. The team played their home games at Hank McCamish Pavilion in Atlanta, Georgia as members of the Atlantic Coast Conference. They finished the season 22–15, 5–11 in ACC play to finish in tenth place. They advanced to the second round of the ACC women's tournament where they lost to Miami (FL). They were invited to the Women's National Invitation Tournament where they advanced to the championship game where they lost to Michigan.

== 2016–17 media ==
All Yellow Jackets games will air on the Yellow Jackets IMG Sports Network. WREK once again serves as the home of the Ramblin Wreck women's basketball team.

== Roster ==
2016–17 Georgia Tech Yellow Jackets women's basketball team
Players
Coaches

Pos.	#	Name	Height	Year	Previous school	Hometown
G	0	Imani Tilford	5 ft 5 in (1.65 m)	Jr	Woodlands	Greenburgh, NY
G	1	Kaylan Pugh	5 ft 9 in (1.75 m)	So	St. Mary's Episcopal; Ohio State	Collierville, TN
G	2	Zutorya Cook	5 ft 7 in (1.7 m)	Fr	Osborne	Marietta, GA
F	4	Anne Francoise Diouf	6 ft 4 in (1.93 m)	Fr	IMG Academy	Dakar, Senegal
F	10	Katarina Vuckovic	6 ft 3 in (1.91 m)	Sr	Crvena Zvezda	Smederevo, Serbia
F	11	Elo Edeferioka	6 ft 2 in (1.88 m)	Sr	Life Center Academy	Warri, Nigeria
G	24	Cha'Ron Sweeney	5 ft 2 in (1.57 m)	Sr	Rogers; Eastern Michigan	Toledo, OH
C	14	Simina Avram	6 ft 3 in (1.91 m)	Jr	Andre Saguna	Brașov, Romania
C	15	Chelsea Guimaraes	6 ft 3 in (1.91 m)	So	Professor José Augusto Lucas	Almada, Portugal
F	21	Zaire O'Neil	5 ft 11 in (1.8 m)	Jr	Malcolm X Shabazz	Newark, NJ
F	22	Julia Grey (W)	6 ft 3 in (1.91 m)	So	Cambridge	Alpharetta, GA
G	24	Chanin Scott	6 ft 0 in (1.83 m)	Fr	Meyers Park	Charlotte, NC
G	33	Francesca Pan	6 ft 1 in (1.85 m)	Fr	None	Bassano del Grappa, Italy
F	44	Martine Fortune	6 ft 3 in (1.91 m)	So	The Shipley School	Philadelphia, PA
G	55	Antonia Peresson	5 ft 9 in (1.75 m)	Jr	Liceo Stefanini Yenezia	Pordenone, Italy

Head coach

- MaChelle Joseph (Purdue)

Assistant coach(es)

- Kevin Morrison (Cal Poly)
- Rob Norris (Indiana (PA))
- M. L. Willis (Iowa)

Legend

- (C) Team captain
- (S) Suspended
- (I) Ineligible
- (W) Walk-on
- Injured
- Current redshirt

Roster

== Schedule ==
Date time, TV	Rank^{#}	Opponent^{#}	Result	Record	Site (attendance) city, state
Non-conference regular season
11/11/2016*; 5:30 pm		Samford	W 62–57	1–0	Hank McCamish Pavilion (823); Atlanta, GA
11/13/2016*; 2:00 pm		Alabama State	W 70–48	2–0	Hank McCamish Pavilion (618); Atlanta, GA
11/16/2016*; 7:00 pm, ESPN3		at Kennesaw State	W 86–49	3–0	KSU Convocation Center (889); Kennesaw, GA
11/20/2016*; 2:00 pm, ACCN Extra		Georgia	W 52–45	4–0	Hank McCamish Pavilion (2,206); Atlanta, GA
11/25/2016*; 1:00 pm		vs. Dayton; Junkanoo Jam Freeport Division semifinals	W 81–68	5–0	St. George HS Gymnasium (326); Freeport, BAH
11/26/2016*; 3:15 pm		vs. Missouri; Junkanoo Jam Freeport Division championship	W 72–70	6–0	St. George HS Gymnasium; Freeport, BAH
12/01/2016*; 7:00 pm, ACCN Extra		Michigan; ACC–Big Ten Women's Challenge	L 52–92	6–1	Hank McCamish Pavilion (818); Atlanta, GA
12/03/2016*; 2:00 pm		Georgia State	W 73–42	7–1	Hank McCamish Pavilion (1,235); Atlanta, GA
12/07/2016*; 7:00 pm		Mercer	W 70–50	8–1	Hank McCamish Pavilion (520); Atlanta, GA
12/11/2016*; 2:00 pm		Appalachian State	W 81–52	9–1	Hank McCamish Pavilion (718); Atlanta, GA
12/17/2016*; 3:00 pm		at Alabama	L 65–67	9–2	Coleman Coliseum (2,214); Tuscaloosa, AL
12/22/2016*; 7:30 pm		at Middle Tennessee	W 61–60	10–2	Murphy Center (4,222); Murfreesboro, TN
12/29/2016*; 7:00 pm		Princeton	W 67–51	11–2	Hank McCamish Pavilion (856); Atlanta, GA
ACC regular season
01/02/2017; 7:00 pm, ACCN Extra		No. 7 Notre Dame	L 38–55	11–3 (0–1)	Hank McCamish Pavilion (1,641); Atlanta, GA
01/05/2017; 7:00 pm		No. 13 Duke	L 68–75	11–4 (0–2)	Hank McCamish Pavilion (743); Atlanta, GA
01/12/2017; 7:00 pm, ACCN Extra		at Boston College	W 71–67	12–4 (1–2)	Conte Forum (535); Chestnut Hill, MA
01/15/2017; 1:00 pm, RSN		Syracuse	W 75–66	13–4 (2–2)	Hank McCamish Pavilion (1,152); Atlanta, GA
01/18/2017; 7:00 pm, ACCN Extra		at No. 9 Louisville	L 51–91	13–5 (2–3)	KFC Yum! Center (7,606); Louisville, KY
01/22/2017; 2:00 pm		at Wake Forest	L 65–70 ^{OT}	13–6 (2–4)	LJVM Coliseum (1,022); Winston-Salem, NC
01/26/2017; 7:00 pm, ACCN Extra		No. 7 Florida State	L 63–69	13–7 (2–5)	Hank McCamish Pavilion (1,017); Atlanta, GA
01/29/2017; 2:00 pm, ACCN Extra		at Clemson	L 61–62	13–8 (2–6)	Littlejohn Coliseum (365); Clemson, SC
02/02/2017; 7:00 pm, RSN		at Virginia	L 64–65 ^{OT}	13–9 (2–7)	John Paul Jones Arena (3,187); Charlottesville, VA
02/05/2017; 2:00 pm, ACCN Extra		Virginia Tech	W 87–81	14–9 (3–7)	Hank McCamish Pavilion (1,023); Atlanta, GA
02/09/2017; 7:00 pm, ACCN Extra		No. 17 NC State	L 67–75	14–10 (3–8)	Hank McCamish Pavilion (748); Atlanta, GA
02/12/2017; 1:00 pm, RSN		at No. 7 Notre Dame	L 69–90	14–11 (3–9)	Edmund P. Joyce Center (9,149); Atlanta, GA
02/16/2017; 7:00 pm, ACCN Extra		at North Carolina	L 88–89	14–12 (3–10)	Carmichael Auditorium (1,909); Chapel Hill, NC
02/19/2017; 2:00 pm, ACCN Extra		Pittsburgh	W 71–57	15–12 (4–10)	Hank McCamish Pavilion (1,039); Atlanta, GA
02/23/2017; 7:00 pm, ACCN Extra		Clemson	W 72–58	16–12 (5–10)	Hank McCamish Pavilion (1,040); Atlanta, GA
02/26/2017; 1:00 pm, RSN		at No. 17 Miami (FL)	L 70–75	16–13 (5–11)	Watsco Center (1,321); Coral Gables, FL
ACC Women's Tournament
03/01/2017; 3:30 pm, RSN	(10)	vs. (15) Boston College; First Round	W 71–67	17–13	HTC Center (2,769); Conway, SC
03/02/2017; 6:00 pm, RSN	(10)	vs. (7) No. 16 Miami (FL); Second Round	L 71–87	17–14	HTC Center (3,145); Conway, SC
WNIT
03/16/2017*; 7:00 pm		Jacksonville; First Round	W 71–55	18–14	Hank McCamish Pavilion (766); Atlanta, GA
03/19/2017*; 5:00 pm		UCF; Second Round	W 63–51	19–14	Hank McCamish Pavilion (682); Atlanta, GA
03/23/2017*; 7:00 pm		Middle Tennessee; Third Round	W 70–57	20–14	Hank McCamish Pavilion (819); Atlanta, GA
03/26/2017*; 2:00 pm		Alabama; Quarterfinals	W 76–66	21–14	Hank McCamish Pavilion (821); Atlanta, GA
03/29/2017*; 7:00 pm		Washington State; Semifinals	W 69–61	22–14	Hank McCamish Pavilion (1,106); Atlanta, GA
04/01/2017*; 3:00 pm, CBSSN		at Michigan; Championship Game	L 79–89 ^{3OT}	22–15	Calihan Hall (4,417); Detroit, MI
*Non-conference game. ^{#}Rankings from AP Poll,. (#) Tournament seedings in parentheses. All times are in Eastern Time.

== Rankings ==
2016–17 NCAA Division I women's basketball rankings

Regular season polls
Poll	Pre- Season	Week 2	Week 3	Week 4	Week 5	Week 6	Week 7	Week 8	Week 9	Week 10	Week 11	Week 12	Week 13	Week 14	Week 15	Week 16	Week 17	Week 18	Week 19	Final
AP	NR	NR	NR	RV	NR	NR	NR	NR	RV	NR	RV	NR	NR	NR	NR	NR	NR	NR	NR	N/A
Coaches	RV	RV	RV	RV	RV	RV	NR	NR	NR	NR	NR	NR	NR	NR	NR	NR	NR	NR	NR	RV

Legend
	Increase in ranking
	Decrease in ranking
	Not ranked previous week
(RV)	Received Votes

== See also ==
2016–17 Georgia Tech Yellow Jackets men's basketball team
