= 2016–17 Notre Dame Fighting Irish women's basketball team =

Intercollegiate basketball season

2016–17 Notre Dame Fighting Irish women's basketball

ACC tournament champions ACC regular season champions Preseason WNIT champions

NCAA tournament, Elite Eight
- Conference: Atlantic Coast Conference

Ranking
- Coaches: No. 2
- AP: No. 2
- Record: 33–4 (15–1 ACC)
- Head coach: Muffet McGraw (30th season)
- Assistant coaches: Carol Owens; Beth Cunningham; Niele Ivey
- Home arena: Edmund P. Joyce Center

2016–17 ACC women's basketball standings
	Conf.				Overall
Team	W		L	PCT	W		L	PCT
No. 2 Notre Dame^{†}	15	–	1	.938	33	–	4	.892
No. 9 Duke	13	–	3	.813	28	–	6	.824
No. 10 Florida State	13	–	3	.813	28	–	7	.800
No. 13 Louisville	12	–	4	.750	29	–	8	.784
No. 17 NC State	12	–	4	.750	23	–	9	.719
No. 21 Syracuse	11	–	5	.688	22	–	11	.667
No. 16 Miami (FL)	10	–	6	.625	24	–	9	.727
Virginia	7	–	9	.438	20	–	13	.606
Wake Forest	6	–	10	.375	16	–	16	.500
Georgia Tech	5	–	11	.313	22	–	14	.611
Virginia Tech	4	–	12	.250	20	–	14	.588
Pittsburgh	4	–	12	.250	13	–	17	.433
Clemson	3	–	13	.188	15	–	16	.484
North Carolina	3	–	13	.188	15	–	16	.484
Boston College	2	–	14	.125	9	–	21	.300
† 2017 ACC tournament winner As of March 29, 2017; Rankings from AP poll

The 2016–17 Notre Dame Fighting Irish women's basketball team represented the University of Notre Dame during the 2016–17 NCAA Division I women's basketball season. The Fighting Irish, led by thirtieth year head coach Muffet McGraw, play their home games at Edmund P. Joyce Center and were fourth year members of the Atlantic Coast Conference. They finished the season with 33–4, 15–1 in ACC play to win both of the ACC Regular Season and Tournament for the fourth year in a row. They earned an automatic bid to the NCAA women's tournament where they defeated Robert Morris and Purdue in the first and second rounds, respectively. The Irish women defeated Ohio State in the sweet sixteen before losing in a rematch of last year's sweet sixteen to Stanford in the elite eight.

== Roster ==
2016–17 Notre Dame Fighting Irish women's basketball team
Players
Coaches

Pos.	#	Name	Height	Year	Previous school	Hometown
G	3	Marina Mabrey	5 ft 11 in (1.8 m)	So	Manasquan	Belmar, NJ
G	5	Jackie Young	6 ft 0 in (1.83 m)	Fr	Princeton Community	Princeton, IN
F	11	Brianna Turner	6 ft 3 in (1.91 m)	Jr	Manvel	Pearland, TX
G	14	Mychael Johnson	5 ft 7 in (1.7 m)	Jr	Huntington St. Joseph	Huntington, WV
G	15	Lindsay Allen	5 ft 8 in (1.73 m)	Sr	St. John's College	Michelleville, MD
G	20	Ali Patberg	5 ft 10 in (1.78 m)	So	Columbus North	Columbus, IN
F	21	Kristina Nelson	6 ft 4 in (1.93 m)	RS Jr	Buford	Buford, GA
F	22	Erin Boley	6 ft 2 in (1.88 m)	Fr	Elizabethtown	Hodgenville, KY
G	24	Arike Ogunbowale	5 ft 8 in (1.73 m)	So	Divine Savior Holy Angels	Milwaukee, WI
F	33	Kathryn Westbeld	6 ft 2 in (1.88 m)	Jr	Ketting Fairmount	Kettering, OH
C	35	Diamond Thompson	6 ft 5 in (1.96 m)	Sr	Wheaton Warrenville South	Wheaton, IL

Head coach

- Muffet McGraw (Saint Joseph's)

Assistant coach(es)

- Carol Owens (Northern Illinois)
- Beth Cunningham (Notre Dame)
- Niele Ivey (Notre Dame)

Legend

- (C) Team captain
- (S) Suspended
- (I) Ineligible
- (W) Walk-on
- Injured
- Current redshirt

Roster

== Media ==
All Notre Dame games will air on WHPZ Pulse 96.9 FM. Games are streamed online live.

== Rankings ==
Regular season polls
Poll	Pre- Season	Week 2	Week 3	Week 4	Week 5	Week 6	Week 7	Week 8	Week 9	Week 10	Week 11	Week 12	Week 13	Week 14	Week 15	Week 16	Week 17	Week 18	Week 19	Final
AP	1	1	1	1	2	2	2	2	7	6	6	8	7	7	7	5	3	3	2	N/A
Coaches	2	1	1	1	1	2	2	2	6	6	9	9	8	7	6	4	3	2	2	2

Legend
	Increase in ranking
	Decrease in ranking
	Not ranked previous week
(RV)	Received Votes

== Schedule ==
Date time, TV	Rank^{#}	Opponent^{#}	Result	Record	Site (attendance) city, state
Exhibition
11/03/2016*; 7:00 pm	No. 1	Roberts Wesleyan	W 129–50		Edmund P. Joyce Center (7,675); South Bend, IN
Regular season
11/11/2016*; 7:00 pm, ACCN Extra	No. 1	Central Michigan; Preseason WNIT First Round	W 104–47	1–0	Edmund P. Joyce Center (8,454); South Bend, IN
11/14/2016*; 7:00 pm, ACCN Extra	No. 1	Fordham; Preseason WNIT quarterfinals	W 67–36	2–0	Edmund P. Joyce Center (7,435); South Bend, IN
11/17/2016*; 7:00 pm, ACCN Extra	No. 1	Green Bay; Preseason WNIT semifinals	W 71–67	3–0	Edmund P. Joyce Center (7,817); South Bend, IN
11/20/2016*; 3:00 pm, CBSSN	No. 1	No. 17 Washington; Preseason WNIT championship	W 71–60	4–0	Edmund P. Joyce Center (8,106); South Bend, IN
11/22/2016*; 8:00 pm	No. 1	vs. Louisiana–Lafayette	W 91–51	5–0	Campbell Center (Note: This game did not finish at Campbell Center. A power outage during the second quarter led the teams to move the remainder of the game to Tudor Fieldhouse on the campus of Rice University. The latter venue was available because the Owls had just completed a game against Grand Canyon.) (767); Houston, TX
11/26/2016*; 1:00 pm, ACCN Extra	No. 1	TCU	W 92–59	6–0	Edmund P. Joyce Center (8,174); South Bend, IN
11/30/2016*; 9:00 pm, BTN	No. 1	at Iowa; ACC–Big Ten Women's Challenge	W 73–58	7–0	Carver–Hawkeye Arena (3,809); Iowa City, IA
12/04/2016*; 1:00 pm, ACCN Extra	No. 1	Valparaiso	W 114–54	8–0	Edmund P. Joyce Center (8,132); South Bend, IN
12/07/2016*; 7:00 pm, ESPN2	No. 2	No. 1 Connecticut; Rivalry	L 61–72	8–1	Edmund P. Joyce Center (9,149); South Bend, IN
12/10/2016*; 8:00 pm, CSNC+	No. 2	at No. 16 DePaul	W 75–61	9–1	McGrath-Phillips Arena (3,001); Chicago, IL
12/18/2016*; 2:00 pm, ESPN3	No. 2	at Toledo	W 85–68	10–1	Savage Arena (5,697); Toledo, OH
12/20/2016*; 7:00 pm, BTN	No. 2	at Michigan State	W 79–61	11–1	Breslin Center (7,924); East Lansing, MI
12/27/2016*; 7:30 pm	No. 2	at Chattanooga	W 79–58	12–1	McKenzie Arena (3,388); Chattanooga, TN
12/29/2016; 7:00 pm, ACCN Extra	No. 2	at NC State	L 62–70	12–2 (0–1)	Reynolds Coliseum (3,677); Raleigh, NC
01/02/2017; 7:00 pm	No. 7	at Georgia Tech	W 55–38	13–2 (1–1)	Hank McCamish Pavilion (1,641); Atlanta, GA
01/05/2017; 7:00 pm, ACCN Extra	No. 7	Wake Forest	W 92–72	14–2 (2–1)	Edmund P. Joyce Center (8,691); South Bend, IN
01/08/2017; 3:00 pm, ESPN2	No. 7	at No. 14 Miami (FL)	W 67–55	15–2 (3–1)	Watsco Center (1,546); Coral Gables, FL
01/12/2017; 7:00 pm, ACCN Extra	No. 6	Pittsburgh	W 86–54	16–2 (4–1)	Edmund P. Joyce Center (8,137); South Bend, IN
01/16/2017*; 7:00 pm, ESPN2	No. 6	at Tennessee	L 69–71	16–3	Thompson–Boling Arena (10,517); Knoxville, TN
01/19/2017; 7:00 pm	No. 6	at Boston College	W 80–69	17–3 (5–1)	Conte Forum (1,108); Chestnut Hill, MA
01/22/2017; 12:00 pm, ESPNU	No. 6	at North Carolina	W 77–55	18–3 (6–1)	Carmichael Arena (3,159); Chapel Hill, NC
01/26/2017; 7:00 pm, ACCN Extra	No. 8	No. 14 Duke	W 62–58	19–3 (7–1)	Edmund P. Joyce Center (8,309); South Bend, IN
01/29/2017; 12:00 pm, ESPNU	No. 8	Virginia	W 82–74	20–3 (8–1)	Edmund P. Joyce Center (9,149); South Bend, IN
02/02/2017; 7:00 pm	No. 8	at Virginia Tech	W 76–59	21–3 (9–1)	Cassell Coliseum (2,733); Blacksburg, VA
02/06/2017; 7:00 pm, ESPN2	No. 7	No. 12 Louisville	W 85–66	22–3 (10–1)	Edmund P. Joyce Center (8,325); South Bend, IN
02/12/2017; 1:00 pm, ACCN Extra	No. 7	Georgia Tech	W 90–69	23–3 (11–1)	Edmund P. Joyce Center (9,149); South Bend, IN
02/16/2017; 7:00 pm	No. 7	at Clemson	W 84–80	24–3 (12–1)	Littlejohn Coliseum (595); Clemson, SC
02/19/2017; 5:00 pm, ESPN2	No. 7	at No. 21 Syracuse	W 85–80	25–3 (13–1)	Carrier Dome (11,021); Syracuse, NY
02/23/2017; 7:00 pm, ACCN Extra	No. 5	Boston College	W 82–45	26–3 (14–1)	Edmund P. Joyce Center (8,376); South Bend, IN
02/26/2017; 1:00 pm, ESPN2	No. 5	No. 8 Florida State	W 79–61	27–3 (15–1)	Edmund P. Joyce Center (9,149); South Bend, IN
ACC Women's Tournament
03/03/2017; 2:00 pm, RSN	(1) No. 3	vs. (8) Virginia; Quarterfinals	W 76–59	28–3	HTC Center (2,845); Conway, SC
03/04/2017; 2:00 pm, ESPN2	(1) No. 3	vs. (5) No. 14 Louisville; Semifinals	W 84–73	29–3	HTC Center (3,600); Conway, SC
03/05/2017; 1:00 pm, ESPN2	(1) No. 3	vs. (3) No. 13 Duke; Championship Game	W 84–61	30–3	HTC Center (3,600); Conway, SC
NCAA Women's Tournament
03/17/2017*; 7:30 pm, ESPN2	(1 L) No. 2	(16 L) Robert Morris; First Round	W 79–49	31–3	Edmund P. Joyce Center (5,685); South Bend, IN
03/19/2017*; 9:00 pm, ESPN	(1 L) No. 2	(9 L) Purdue; Second Round	W 88–82 ^{OT}	32–3	Edmund P. Joyce Center (5,422); South Bend, IN
03/24/2017*; 7:00 pm, ESPN	(1 L) No. 2	vs. (5 L) No. 11 Ohio State; Sweet Sixteen	W 99–76	33–3	Rupp Arena (3,148); Lexington, KY
03/26/2017*; 12:00 pm, ESPN	(1 L) No. 2	vs. (2 L) No. 6 Stanford; Elite Eight	L 75–76	33–4	Rupp Arena (2,527); Lexington, KY
*Non-conference game. ^{#}Rankings from AP Poll. (#) Tournament seedings in parentheses. L=Lexington Region. All times are in Eastern.
