= 2017 Conference USA women's basketball tournament =

- Classification: Division I
- Season: 2016–17
- Teams: 12
- Site: Legacy Arena; Bartow Arena; Birmingham, Alabama
- Champions: WKU (2nd title)
- Winning coach: Michelle Clark-Heard (2nd title)
- MVP: Kendall Noble (WKU)
- Television: ASN, CBSSN, Campus Insiders

2016–17 Conference USA women's basketball standings
	Conf.				Overall
Team	W		L	PCT	W		L	PCT
WKU †	16	–	2	.889	27	–	8	.771
Middle Tennessee	15	–	3	.833	23	–	11	.676
Southern Miss	13	–	5	.722	23	–	11	.676
Charlotte	12	–	6	.667	21	–	10	.677
Louisiana Tech	12	–	6	.667	18	–	14	.563
Old Dominion	11	–	7	.611	17	–	14	.548
UTSA	10	–	8	.556	14	–	17	.452
Rice	8	–	10	.444	22	–	13	.629
UAB	8	–	10	.444	15	–	15	.500
North Texas	8	–	10	.444	12	–	19	.387
Marshall	5	–	13	.278	13	–	17	.433
UTEP	5	–	13	.278	8	–	23	.258
FIU	3	–	15	.167	5	–	24	.172
Florida Atlantic	0	–	18	.000	4	–	25	.138
† 2017 C-USA Tournament winner As of March 26, 2017; Rankings from AP poll

The 2017 Conference USA women's basketball tournament was a postseason women's basketball tournament for Conference USA was held March 8–11 in Birmingham, Alabama. The first two rounds took place at Bartow Arena while the semifinals and championship took place at Legacy Arena. WKU won their 2nd C-USA tournament title and earned an automatic trip to the NCAA women's tournament.

== Seeds ==
The top twelve teams qualified for the tournament. Teams were seeded by record within the conference, with a tiebreaker system to seed teams with identical conference records.

Seed	School	Conference	Overall	Tiebreaker
1	Western Kentucky	16–2	25–6	
2	Middle Tennessee	15–3	20–9	
3	Southern Miss	13–5	21–9	
4	Louisiana Tech	12–6	17–12	1–0 vs. Charlotte
5	Charlotte	12–6	20–9	0–1 vs. Louisiana Tech
6	Old Dominion	11–7	16–13	
7	UTSA	10–8	14–15	
8	Rice	8–10	17–12	1–1 vs. Charlotte
9	North Texas	8–10	11–18	0–2 vs. Charlotte
10	UAB	7–11	14–15	
11	UTEP	5–13	8–22	
12	Marshall	5–13	13–16	
‡ – C–USA regular season champions, and tournament No. 1 seed. † – Received a double–bye in the conference tournament. # – Received a single–bye in the conference tournament. Overall records include all games played in the C–USA Tournament.

Eliminated from Conference tournament: Florida Atlantic, Florida International

== Schedule ==
*Game times in CT. #-Rankings denote tournament seed

Round	Date	Game	Matchup^{#}	Television	Attendance
First	March 8, 2017	1	#9 UAB vs #8 North Texas	Campus Insiders	820
First	March 8, 2017	2	#12 Marshall vs #5 Charlotte	Campus Insiders	820
First	March 8, 2017	3	#10 Rice vs #7 UTSA	Campus Insiders	1,001
First	March 8, 2017	4	#11 UTEP vs #6 Old Dominion	Campus Insiders	1,001
Quarterfinal	March 9, 2017	5	#1 WKU vs #8 North Texas	Campus Insiders	686
Quarterfinal	March 9, 2017	6	#4 Louisiana Tech vs #5 Charlotte	Campus Insiders	686
Quarterfinal	March 9, 2017	7	#2 Middle Tennessee vs #10 Rice	Campus Insiders	
Quarterfinal	March 9, 2017	8	#3 Southern Miss vs #6 Old Dominion	Campus Insiders	
Semifinals	March 10, 2017	9	#1 WKU vs #4 Louisiana Tech	ASN	
Semifinals	March 10, 2017	10	#2 Middle Tennessee vs #3 Southern Miss	ASN	
Championship	March 11, 2017	11	#1 WKU vs. #3 Southern Miss	CBSSN	

== Bracket ==
First round Wednesday, March 8 CI
8	North Texas	65^{2OT}
9	UAB	62
5	Charlotte	71
12	Marshall	66
7	UTSA	63
10	Rice	75
6	Old Dominion	80
11	UTEP	70

Quarterfinals; Thursday, March 9 CI
1	Western Kentucky	78
8	North Texas	51
4	Louisiana Tech	66
5	Charlotte	55
2	Middle Tennessee	61
10	Rice	59
3	Southern Miss	80
6	Old Dominion	74

Semifinals; Friday, March 10; ASN
1	Western Kentucky	77
4	Louisiana Tech	59
2	Middle Tennessee	54
3	Southern Miss	59

Championship game Saturday, March 11; CBSSN
1	Western Kentucky	67
3	Southern Miss	56

All times listed are Central

== See also ==
2017 Conference USA men's basketball tournament
