= 2016–17 Florida Atlantic Owls women's basketball team =

Intercollegiate basketball season

2016–17 Florida Atlantic Owls women's basketball
- Conference: Conference USA
- Record: 4–25 (0–18 C-USA)
- Head coach: Kellie Lewis-Jay (5th season)
- Assistant coaches: Danielle Stimenoff; Cindy Hilbrich; Kachine Alexander
- Home arena: FAU Arena

2016–17 Conference USA women's basketball standings
	Conf.				Overall
Team	W		L	PCT	W		L	PCT
WKU †	16	–	2	.889	27	–	8	.771
Middle Tennessee	15	–	3	.833	23	–	11	.676
Southern Miss	13	–	5	.722	23	–	11	.676
Charlotte	12	–	6	.667	21	–	10	.677
Louisiana Tech	12	–	6	.667	18	–	14	.563
Old Dominion	11	–	7	.611	17	–	14	.548
UTSA	10	–	8	.556	14	–	17	.452
Rice	8	–	10	.444	22	–	13	.629
UAB	8	–	10	.444	15	–	15	.500
North Texas	8	–	10	.444	12	–	19	.387
Marshall	5	–	13	.278	13	–	17	.433
UTEP	5	–	13	.278	8	–	23	.258
FIU	3	–	15	.167	5	–	24	.172
Florida Atlantic	0	–	18	.000	4	–	25	.138
† 2017 C-USA Tournament winner As of March 26, 2017; Rankings from AP poll

The 2016–17 Florida Atlantic Owls women's basketball team represented Florida Atlantic University during the 2016–17 NCAA Division I women's basketball season. The Owls, led by fifth year head coach Kellie Lewis-Jay, played their home games at FAU Arena and were members of Conference USA. They finished the season 4–24, 0–18 for in C-USA play to finish in last place. They failed to qualify for the C-USA women's tournament.

== Roster ==
2016–17 Florida Atlantic Owls women's basketball team
Players
Coaches

Pos.	#	Name	Height	Year	Previous school	Hometown
G	0	Danneal Ford	5 ft 9 in (1.75 m)	Jr	Norland	Miami, FL
G	4	Tyana Robimson	5 ft 11 in (1.8 m)	Fr	Pike HS	Indianapolis, IN
F	5	Raven Doyle	6 ft 2 in (1.88 m)	RS Jr	Desert Christian HS	Lancaster, CA
G	10	Vashnie Perry	5 ft 6 in (1.68 m)	Fr	Norcross HS	Norcross, GA
G/F	11	Jacey Bailey	6 ft 3 in (1.91 m)	Fr	Burnaby Mountain SS	Burnaby, BC
G	12	Julie Fournier	5 ft 6 in (1.68 m)	RS Fr	Fernandina Beach HS; Louisiana Tech	Fernandia Beach, FL
G/F	13	Kat Wright	6 ft 0 in (1.83 m)	Sr	Notre Dame HS	Woodland Hills, CA
F	15	Sasha Cedeno	6 ft 3 in (1.91 m)	Jr	Klein Oak HS	Spring, TX
G/F	21	Julia Jenike	6 ft 0 in (1.83 m)	Fr	Bethel Tate HS	Bethel, OH
G	23	Alexis Shannon	5 ft 9 in (1.75 m)	Fr	Noblesville HS	Noblesville, IN
F	31	Ra'Kyra Gabriel	6 ft 2 in (1.88 m)	Fr	Brookside Christian HS	Stockton, CA
G	32	Malia Kency	5 ft 6 in (1.68 m)	Jr	Briarwood Academy	Statesboro, GA
G	33	Nika Zyryanova	5 ft 9 in (1.75 m)	Jr	Casper College	Yekaterinburg, Russia
F	34	Katlyn O'Reilly	5 ft 11 in (1.8 m)	Fr	Noblesville HS	Westfield, IN
F	50	Melinda Meyers	6 ft 2 in (1.88 m)	Jr	Highland HS	Gilbert, AZ

Head coach

- Kellie Lewis-Jay (Boise State)

Assistant coach(es)

- Danielle Stimenoff (Carroll (MT))
- Cindy Hilbrich (USC Aiken)
- Kachine Alexander (Concordia–St. Paul)

Legend

- (C) Team captain
- (S) Suspended
- (I) Ineligible
- (W) Walk-on
- Injured
- Current redshirt

Roster

== Schedule ==
Date time, TV	Rank^{#}	Opponent^{#}	Result	Record	Site (attendance) city, state
Non-conference regular season
11/11/2016*; 7:00 pm		Florida Memorial	W 84–64	1–0	FAU Arena (493); Boca Raton, FL
11/14/2016*; 7:00 pm		Indiana State	W 70–67	2–0	FAU Arena (535); Boca Raton, FL
11/18/2016*; 7:00 pm, ESPN3		at Mercer	L 57–74	2–1	Hawkins Arena (972); Macon, GA
11/20/2016*; 1:00 pm, ESPN3		at North Florida	L 88–95 ^{2OT}	2–2	UNF Arena (302); Jacksonville, FL
11/25/2016*; 12:00 pm		Jacksonville State; FAU Thanksgiving Tournament semifinals	W 63–55	3–2	FAU Arena (351); Boca Raton, FL
11/26/2016*; 2:30 pm		Richmond; FAU Thanksgiving Tournament championship	L 67–77	3–3	FAU Arena (432); Boca Raton, FL
12/01/2016*; 9:00 pm		at Arizona	L 67–77	3–4	McKale Center (1,084); Tucson, AZ
12/04/2016*; 2:00 pm		at Grand Canyon	L 60–81	3–5	GCU Arena (636); Phoenix, AZ
12/11/2016*; 2:00 pm		Florida Gulf Coast	L 50–65	3–6	FAU Arena (380); Boca Raton, FL
12/16/2016*; 5:00 pm		Jackson State; FAU Holiday Tournament semifinals	W 67–58	4–6	FAU Arena (295); Boca Raton, FL
12/17/2016*; 7:30 pm		Maryland Eastern Shore; FAU Holiday Tournament championship	L 59–76	4–7	FAU Arena (387); Boca Raton, FL
Conference USA regular season
12/30/2016; 8:00 pm		at WKU	L 55–76	4–8 (0–1)	E. A. Diddle Arena (1,324); Bowling Green, KY
01/01/2017; 1:00 pm		at Marshall	L 53–76	4–9 (0–2)	Cam Henderson Center (717); Huntington, WV
01/07/2017; 2:00 pm		at FIU	L 65–74	4–10 (0–3)	FIU Arena (309); Miami, FL
01/12/2017; 7:00 pm		UTSA	L 62–72	4–11 (0–4)	FAU Arena (665); Boca Raton, FL
01/14/2017; 5:00 pm		UTEP	L 50–51	4–12 (0–5)	FAU Arena (425); Boca Raton, FL
01/19/2017; 8:00 pm		at UAB	L 55–66	4–13 (0–6)	Bartow Arena (271); Birmingham, AL
01/21/2017; 3:00 pm, beIN		at Middle Tennessee	L 69–87	4–14 (0–7)	Murphy Center (3,017); Murfreesboro, TN
01/26/2017; 7:00 pm		FIU	L 60–65	4–15 (0–8)	FAU Arena (519); Boca Raton, FL
02/02/2017; 7:00 pm		Charlotte	L 66–72	4–16 (0–9)	FAU Arena (708); Boca Raton, FL
02/04/2017; 5:00 pm		Old Dominion	L 73–93	4–17 (0–10)	FAU Arena (409); Boca Raton, FL
02/09/2017; 8:00 pm		at North Texas	L 57–79	4–18 (0–11)	The Super Pit (667); Denton, TX
02/11/2017; 3:00 pm		at Rice	L 55–74	4–19 (0–12)	Tudor Fieldhouse (312); Houston, TX
02/16/2017; 7:00 pm		Louisiana Tech	L 52–76	4–20 (0–13)	FAU Arena (489); Boca Raton, FL
02/18/2017; 7:00 pm		Southern Miss	L 67–82	4–21 (0–14)	FAU Arena (638); Boca Raton, FL
02/23/2017; 8:05 pm		at UTEP	L 59–69	4–22 (0–15)	Don Haskins Center (1,473); El Paso, TX
02/25/2017; 3:00 pm		at UTSA	L 66–97	4–23 (0–16)	Convocation Center (507); San Antonio, TX
03/02/2017; 7:00 pm		UAB	L 75–78	4–24 (0–17)	FAU Arena (445); Boca Raton, FL
03/04/2017; 5:00 pm		Middle Tennessee	L 59–71	4–25 (0–18)	FAU Arena (510); Boca Raton, FL
*Non-conference game. ^{#}Rankings from AP Poll. (#) Tournament seedings in parentheses. All times are in Eastern Time.

== See also ==
- 2016–17 Florida Atlantic Owls men's basketball team
