= 2016–17 FIU Panthers women's basketball team =

Intercollegiate basketball season

2016–17 FIU Panthers women's basketball
- Conference: Conference USA
- Record: 5–24 (3–15 C-USA)
- Head coach: Tiara Malcom (1st season)
- Assistant coaches: Keunta Miles; LaSondra Barrett; Joe Silvestri
- Home arena: FIU Arena

2016–17 Conference USA women's basketball standings
	Conf.				Overall
Team	W		L	PCT	W		L	PCT
WKU †	16	–	2	.889	27	–	8	.771
Middle Tennessee	15	–	3	.833	23	–	11	.676
Southern Miss	13	–	5	.722	23	–	11	.676
Charlotte	12	–	6	.667	21	–	10	.677
Louisiana Tech	12	–	6	.667	18	–	14	.563
Old Dominion	11	–	7	.611	17	–	14	.548
UTSA	10	–	8	.556	14	–	17	.452
Rice	8	–	10	.444	22	–	13	.629
UAB	8	–	10	.444	15	–	15	.500
North Texas	8	–	10	.444	12	–	19	.387
Marshall	5	–	13	.278	13	–	17	.433
UTEP	5	–	13	.278	8	–	23	.258
FIU	3	–	15	.167	5	–	24	.172
Florida Atlantic	0	–	18	.000	4	–	25	.138
† 2017 C-USA Tournament winner As of March 26, 2017; Rankings from AP poll

The 2016–17 FIU Panthers women's basketball team represented Florida International University during the 2016–17 NCAA Division I women's basketball season. The Panthers, led by first year head coach Tiara Malcom, played their home games at FIU Arena, and were members of Conference USA. They finished the season 5–24, 3–15 in C-USA play to finish in 13th place. They failed to qualify for the Conference USA women's tournament.

== Roster ==
2016–17 FIU Panthers women's basketball team
Players
Coaches

Pos.	#	Name	Height	Year	Previous school	Hometown
F	0	Elizabeth Toye (I) (redshirt)	6 ft 0 in (1.83 m)	So	Lindblom Academy; Wisconsin	Chicago, IL
G	1	Kiandre'a Pound	6 ft 0 in (1.83 m)	RS Jr	Sebastian River HS	Vero Beach, FL
G	2	Jade Cheek	5 ft 8 in (1.73 m)	Jr	Dr. Phillips HS	Orlando, FL
G	3	Tianah Alvarado	5 ft 9 in (1.75 m)	Sr	Lakewood HS; Gulf Coast State College	St. Petersburg, FL
G	5	Kayla Rogers	5 ft 8 in (1.73 m)	Fr	Jean Ribault	Jacksonville, FL
G/F	12	Sydney Fields	6 ft 1 in (1.85 m)	Fr	Parkview	Conyers, GA
G	13	Janka Hegedus	6 ft 1 in (1.85 m)	Sr	Eotvos Jozsef HS	Budapest, Hungary
G	15	Kristian Hudson	5 ft 5 in (1.65 m)	So	Clay-Chalkville HS	Birmingham, AL
G	20	Aajah Hawkins	5 ft 7 in (1.7 m)	Jr	Pickerington Central HS	Pickerington, OH
G	21	Alexis Gordon	5 ft 8 in (1.73 m)	Fr	Covenant Christian	Palm Bay, FL
G	23	Nikolina Todorovic	5 ft 7 in (1.7 m)	Sr	Gymnasium Banja Luka	Bosnia and Herzegovina
G	25	Amari Hawkins	5 ft 8 in (1.73 m)	Jr	Pickerington Central HS	Pickerington, OH
G	32	Soraya Page	5 ft 11 in (1.8 m)	Sr	Matthew Flinders Girls Secondary College; Diablo Valley College	Queensland, Australia

Head coach

- Tiara Malcom (Delaware)

Assistant coach(es)

- Keunta Miles (North Florida)
- LaSondra Barrett (LSU)
- Joe Silvestri (Central Florida)

Legend

- (C) Team captain
- (S) Suspended
- (I) Ineligible
- (W) Walk-on
- Injured
- Current redshirt

Roster

== Schedule ==
Date time, TV	Rank^{#}	Opponent^{#}	Result	Record	Site (attendance) city, state
Non-conference regular season
11/11/2016*; 5:00 pm		UCF	L 52–69	0–1	FIU Arena (598); Miami, FL
11/15/2016*; 7:00 pm, ESPN3		at Florida Gulf Coast	L 42–89	0–2	Alico Arena (1,679); Fort Myers, FL
11/22/2016*; 7:00 pm		Georgetown	L 53–66	0–3	FIU Arena (436); Miami, FL
11/25/2016*; 12:00 pm		Weber State; FIU Thanksgiving Tournament semifinals	L 61–64 ^{OT}	0–4	FIU Arena (331); Miami, FL
11/27/2016*; 2:00 pm		Robert Morris; FIU Thanksgiving Tournament 3rd place game	W 59–57	1–4	FIU Arena (344); Miami, FL
11/30/2016*; 7:00 pm		at South Florida	L 41–91	1–5	USF Sun Dome (1,812); Tampa, FL
12/03/2016*; 2:00 pm		Jacksonville	L 56–71	1–6	FIU Arena (406); Miami, FL
12/16/2016*; 7:00 pm		No. 13 Miami (FL)	L 49–69	1–7	FIU Arena (470); Miami, FL
12/21/2016*; 12:00 pm		Texas Southern	L 62–70	1–8	FIU Arena (252); Miami, FL
12/27/2016*; 12:00 pm		Massachusetts; FIU Holiday Tournament	W 58–57	2–8	FIU Arena; Miami, FL
12/28/2016*; 2:00 pm		George Mason; FIU Holiday Tournament	L 51–67	2–9	FIU Arena (369); Miami, FL
Conference USA regular season
12/30/2016; 6:00 pm		at Marshall	L 52–70	2–10 (0–1)	Cam Henderson Center (604); Huntington, WV
01/01/2017; 3:00 pm		at WKU	L 38–90	2–11 (0–2)	E. A. Diddle Arena (1,033); Bowling Green, KY
01/07/2017; 2:00 pm		Florida Atlantic	W 74–65	3–11 (1–2)	FIU Arena (309); Miami, FL
01/12/2017; 7:00 pm		UTEP	W 88–87 ^{3OT}	4–11 (2–2)	FIU Arena (395); Miami, FL
01/14/2017; 2:00 pm		UTSA	L 61–70	4–12 (2–3)	FIU Arena (408); Miami, FL
01/19/2017; 7:30 pm, ESPN3		at Middle Tennessee	L 69–87	4–13 (2–4)	Murphy Center (3,017); Murfreesboro, TN
01/21/2017; 3:00 pm		at UAB	L 68–82	4–14 (2–5)	Bartow Arena (629); Birmingham, AL
01/26/2017; 7:00 pm		at Florida Atlantic	W 65–60	5–14 (3–5)	FAU Arena (519); Boca Raton, FL
02/02/2017; 7:00 pm		Old Dominion	L 64–86	5–15 (3–6)	FIU Arena (338); Miami, FL
02/04/2017; 2:00 pm		Charlotte	L 54–101	5–16 (3–7)	FIU Arena (374); Miami, FL
02/09/2017; 8:00 pm		at Rice	L 55–74	5–17 (3–8)	Tudor Fieldhouse (312); Houston, TX
02/11/2017; 4:00 pm		at North Texas	L 49–69	5–18 (3–9)	The Super Pit (953); Denton, TX
02/16/2017; 7:00 pm		Southern Miss	L 37–75	5–19 (3–10)	FIU Arena (382); Miami, FL
02/18/2017; 2:00 pm		Louisiana Tech	L 63–76	5–20 (3–11)	FIU Arena (328); Miami, FL
02/23/2017; 8:00 pm		at UTSA	L 55–69	5–21 (3–12)	Convocation Center (655); San Antonio, TX
02/25/2017; 4:00 pm		at UTEP	L 47–88	5–22 (3–13)	Don Haskins Center (1,532); El Paso, TX
03/02/2017; 7:00 pm		Middle Tennessee	L 53–88	5–23 (3–14)	FIU Arena (303); Miami, FL
03/04/2017; 2:00 pm		UAB	L 52–61	5–24 (3–15)	FIU Arena (820); Miami, FL
*Non-conference game. ^{#}Rankings from AP Poll. (#) Tournament seedings in parentheses. All times are in Eastern Time.

== See also ==
2016–17 FIU Panthers men's basketball team
