= 2016–17 Middle Tennessee Blue Raiders women's basketball team =

Intercollegiate basketball season

2016–17 Middle Tennessee Blue Raiders women's basketball

WNIT, Third Round
- Conference: Conference USA
- Record: 23–11 (15–3 C-USA)
- Head coach: Rick Insell (12th season)
- Assistant coaches: Kim Brewton; Tom Hodges; Shalon Pillow
- Home arena: Murphy Center

2016–17 Conference USA women's basketball standings
	Conf.				Overall
Team	W		L	PCT	W		L	PCT
WKU †	16	–	2	.889	27	–	8	.771
Middle Tennessee	15	–	3	.833	23	–	11	.676
Southern Miss	13	–	5	.722	23	–	11	.676
Charlotte	12	–	6	.667	21	–	10	.677
Louisiana Tech	12	–	6	.667	18	–	14	.563
Old Dominion	11	–	7	.611	17	–	14	.548
UTSA	10	–	8	.556	14	–	17	.452
Rice	8	–	10	.444	22	–	13	.629
UAB	8	–	10	.444	15	–	15	.500
North Texas	8	–	10	.444	12	–	19	.387
Marshall	5	–	13	.278	13	–	17	.433
UTEP	5	–	13	.278	8	–	23	.258
FIU	3	–	15	.167	5	–	24	.172
Florida Atlantic	0	–	18	.000	4	–	25	.138
† 2017 C-USA Tournament winner As of March 26, 2017; Rankings from AP poll

The 2016–17 Middle Tennessee Blue Raiders women's basketball team represented Middle Tennessee State University during the 2016–17 NCAA Division I women's basketball season. The Blue Raiders, led by twelfth-year head coach Rick Insell, play their home games at the Murphy Center and were third-year members of Conference USA. They finished the season 23–11, 15–3 in C-USA play to finish in second place. They advanced to the semifinals of the C-USA women's tournament, where they lost to Southern Miss. They received an automatic bid to the Women's National Invitation Tournament, where they defeated Morehead State and Wake Forest in the first and second rounds before losing to Georgia Tech in the third round.

== Roster ==
2016–17 Middle Tennessee Blue Raiders women's basketball team
Players
Coaches

Pos.	#	Name	Height	Year	Previous school	Hometown
F	00	Alex Johnson	6 ft 0 in (1.83 m)	RS So	Blackman HS	Murfreesboro, Tennessee
G	3	Kyla Allison	6 ft 0 in (1.83 m)	Fr	Wekiva HS	Orlando, Florida
G	5	Abbey Sissom	5 ft 8 in (1.73 m)	Jr	Cannon County HS	Woodbury, Tennessee
G	10	Shayla Middlebrooks	5 ft 8 in (1.73 m)	Fr	Elyria HS	Elyria, Ohio
G	12	Jess Louro	5 ft 10 in (1.78 m)	So	St. Rose HS	Wall, New Jersey
F	13	Jordan Majors	6 ft 0 in (1.83 m)	So	Martin Luther King HS	Nashville, Tennessee
G	14	Katie Collier	5 ft 9 in (1.75 m)	So	Webb School of Knoxville	Knoxville, Tennessee
G	20	Ty Petty	5 ft 7 in (1.7 m)	Sr	Riverdale HS	Murfreesboro, Tennessee
G	21	Mychelle Johnson	5 ft 7 in (1.7 m)	Fr	Huntington St. Joseph HS	Huntington, West Virginia
F	23	Gabby Lyon	6 ft 0 in (1.83 m)	Jr	Science Hill HS	Johnson City, Tennessee
F	24	Rebecca Reuter	6 ft 3 in (1.91 m)	Jr	Bradley Central HS	Cleveland, Tennessee
F	35	Charity Savage	5 ft 0 in (1.52 m)	Fr	Barlett HS	Memphis, Tennessee

Head coach

- Rick Insell (Middle Tennessee)

Assistant coach(es)

- Kim Brewton (Liberty)
- Tom Hodges (Tennessee Tech)
- Shalon Pillow (Tennessee)

Legend

- (C) Team captain
- (S) Suspended
- (I) Ineligible
- (W) Walk-on
- Injured
- Current redshirt

Roster

== Rankings ==
Regular season polls
Poll	Pre- Season	Week 2	Week 3	Week 4	Week 5	Week 6	Week 7	Week 8	Week 9	Week 10	Week 11	Week 12	Week 13	Week 14	Week 15	Week 16	Week 17	Week 18	Week 19	Final
AP																				N/A
Coaches																				

Legend
	Increase in ranking
	Decrease in ranking
	Not ranked previous week
(RV)	Received votes

== Schedule ==
Date time, TV	Rank^{#}	Opponent^{#}	Result	Record	Site (attendance) city, state
Exhibition
10/30/2016*; 2:00 pm		Coastal Georgia	W 108–49		Murphy Center (1,836); Murfreesboro, TN
11/03/2016*; 5:00 pm		Truett McConnell	W 125–35		Murphy Center (1,624); Murfreesboro, TN
Non-conference regular season
11/11/2016*; 6:00 pm		at Virginia	L 51–63	0–1	John Paul Jones Arena (2,837); Charlottesville, VA
11/16/2016*; 6:30 pm		No. 5 Louisville	L 72–91	0–2	Murphy Center (4,516); Murfreesboro, TN
11/19/2016*; 6:00 pm		at Tennessee Tech	W 73–62	1–2	Eblen Center (952); Cookeville, TN
11/30/2016*; 11:00 am		Ohio	L 52–73	1–3	Murphy Center (11,222); Murfreesboro, TN
12/03/2016*; 3:00 pm		Tulane	W 62–59	2–3	Murphy Center (2,812); Murfreesboro, TN
12/09/2016*; 6:00 pm		at No. 15 Kentucky	L 48–61	2–4	Memorial Coliseum (4,625); Lexington, KY
12/13/2016*; 6:30 pm		No. 23 Arizona State	L 48–69	2–5	Murphy Center (2,717); Murfreesboro, TN
12/17/2016*; 2:00 pm		Austin Peay	W 82–51	3–5	Murphy Center (2,227); Murfreesboro, TN
12/19/2016*; 6:05 pm		at Missouri State	W 71–52	4–5	JQH Arena (2,243); Springfield, MO
12/22/2016*; 6:30 pm		Georgia Tech	L 60–61	4–6	Murphy Center (4,222); Murfreesboro, TN
12/28/2016*; 6:30 pm		Central Michigan	W 79–69	5–6	Murphy Center (2,911); Murfreesboro, TN
Conference USA regular season
01/01/2017; 2:00 pm		at UAB	W 64–61	6–6 (1–0)	Bartow Arena (293); Birmingham, AL
01/05/2017; 6:30 pm		Rice	W 71–61	7–6 (2–0)	Murphy Center (2,806); Murfreesboro, TN
01/07/2017; 6:00 pm		North Texas	W 60–52	8–6 (3–0)	Murphy Center (3,632); Murfreesboro, TN
01/12/2017; 5:00 pm		at Marshall	W 72–63	9–6 (4–0)	Cam Henderson Center (517); Huntington, WV
01/15/2017; 2:00 pm, FCS		at WKU	L 51–66	9–7 (4–1)	E. A. Diddle Arena (2,064); Bowling Green, KY
01/19/2017; 6:30 pm, ESPN3		FIU	W 95–43	10–7 (5–1)	Murphy Center (2,619); Murfreesboro, TN
01/21/2017; 2:00 pm, beIN		Florida Atlantic	W 87–69	11–7 (6–1)	Murphy Center (3,017); Murfreesboro, TN
01/26/2017; 6:00 pm		at Southern Miss	L 61–81	11–8 (6–2)	Reed Green Coliseum (1,333); Hattiesburg, MS
01/28/2017; 1:00 pm		at Louisiana Tech	W 79–65	12–8 (7–2)	Thomas Assembly Center (1,528); Ruston, LA
02/02/2017; 6:30 pm, ESPN3		UTSA	W 77–63	13–8 (8–2)	Murphy Center (3,152); Murfreesboro, TN
02/04/2017; 7:00 pm, ESPN3		UTEP	W 76–53	14–8 (9–2)	Murphy Center (3,411); Murfreesboro, TN
02/09/2017; 6:00 pm		at Old Dominion	W 80–63	15–8 (10–2)	Ted Constant Convocation Center (1,578); Norfolk, VA
02/11/2017; 6:00 pm, ESPN3		at Charlotte	W 83–81	16–8 (11–2)	Dale F. Halton Arena (1,650); Charlotte, NC
02/16/2017; 6:30 pm, beIN		WKU	L 75–82	16–9 (11–3)	Murphy Center (4,027); Murfreesboro, TN
02/18/2017; 2:00 pm, ESPN3		Marshall	W 94–69	17–9 (12–3)	Murphy Center (3,411); Murfreesboro, TN
02/25/2017; 4:00 pm, ASN		UAB	W 87–56	18–9 (13–3)	Murphy Center (3,505); Murfreesboro, TN
03/02/2017; 6:00 pm		at FIU	W 88–53	19–9 (14–3)	FIU Arena (303); Miami, FL
03/04/2017; 4:00 pm		at Florida Atlantic	W 71–59	20–9 (15–3)	FAU Arena (510); Boca Raton, FL
Conference USA Women's Tournament
03/09/2017; 6:30 pm		vs. Rice; Quarterfinals	W 61–59	21–9	Bartow Arena; Birmingham, AL
03/10/2017; 7:00 pm, ASN		vs. Southern Miss; Semifinals	L 54–59	21–10	Legacy Arena; Birmingham, AL
WNIT
03/16/2017*; 8:30 pm		Morehead State; First Round	W 67–58	22–10	Murphy Center (2,536); Murfreesboro, TN
03/19/2017*; 2:00 pm		Wake Forest; Second Round	W 73–66	23–10	Murphy Center (2,519); Murfreesboro, TN
03/23/2017*; 6:00 pm		at Georgia Tech; Third Round	L 57–70	23–11	Hank McCamish Pavilion (819); Atlanta, GA
*Non-conference game. ^{#}Rankings from AP Poll. (#) Tournament seedings in parentheses. All times are in Central Time.

== See also ==
- 2016–17 Middle Tennessee Blue Raiders men's basketball team
