= 2016–17 Charlotte 49ers women's basketball team =

Intercollegiate basketball season

2016–17 Charlotte 49ers women's basketball
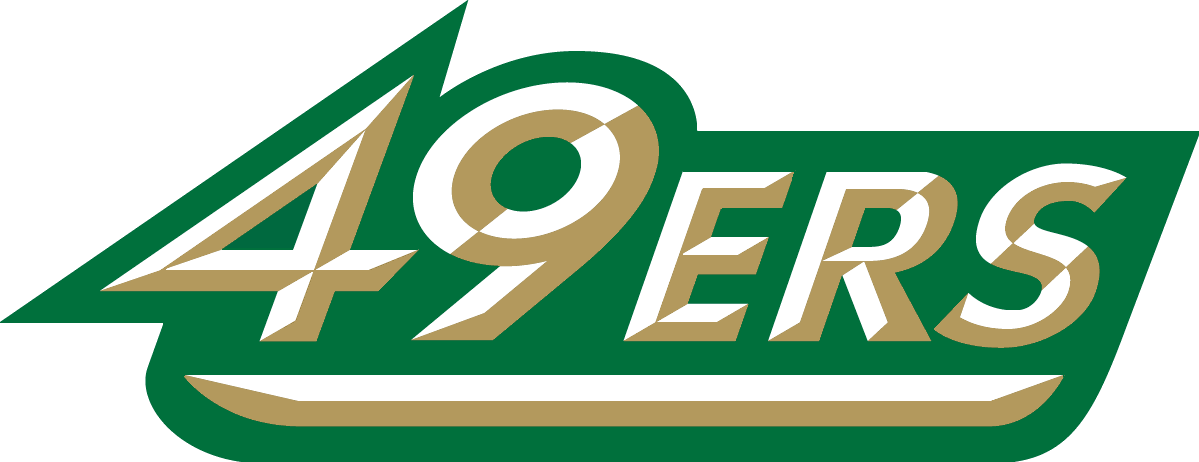
- Conference: Conference USA
- Record: 21–10 (12–6 C-USA)
- Head coach: Cara Consuegra (5th season)
- Assistant coaches: Joanne Aluka-White; Randi Henderson; Nicole Woods
- Home arena: Dale F. Halton Arena

2016–17 Conference USA women's basketball standings
	Conf.				Overall
Team	W		L	PCT	W		L	PCT
WKU †	16	–	2	.889	27	–	8	.771
Middle Tennessee	15	–	3	.833	23	–	11	.676
Southern Miss	13	–	5	.722	23	–	11	.676
Charlotte	12	–	6	.667	21	–	10	.677
Louisiana Tech	12	–	6	.667	18	–	14	.563
Old Dominion	11	–	7	.611	17	–	14	.548
UTSA	10	–	8	.556	14	–	17	.452
Rice	8	–	10	.444	22	–	13	.629
UAB	8	–	10	.444	15	–	15	.500
North Texas	8	–	10	.444	12	–	19	.387
Marshall	5	–	13	.278	13	–	17	.433
UTEP	5	–	13	.278	8	–	23	.258
FIU	3	–	15	.167	5	–	24	.172
Florida Atlantic	0	–	18	.000	4	–	25	.138
† 2017 C-USA Tournament winner As of March 26, 2017; Rankings from AP poll

The 2016–17 Charlotte 49ers women's basketball team represented the University of North Carolina at Charlotte during the 2016–17 NCAA Division I women's basketball season. The 49ers, led by fifth year head coach Cara Consuegra, played their home games at Dale F. Halton Arena and were members of Conference USA. They finished the season 21–10, 12–6 in C-USA play to finish in a tie for fourth place. They advanced to the quarterfinals of the C-USA women's tournament, where they lost to Louisiana Tech. Despite having 21 wins, they were not invited to a postseason tournament.

== Roster ==
2016–17 Charlotte 49ers women's basketball team
Players
Coaches

Pos.	#	Name	Height	Year	Previous school	Hometown
G	1	Ciara Gregory	5 ft 7 in (1.7 m)	Sr	Jeannette	Jeannette, PA
G	4	Laia Raventós	5 ft 7 in (1.7 m)	RS Fr	IES Joaquim Blume	Santa Eulàlia de Riuprimer, Spain
F	15	Nyilah Jamison-Myers	6 ft 3 in (1.91 m)	RS Jr	Orangeburg-Wilkinson; Clemson	Orangeburg, SC
G	21	Lefty Webster	5 ft 8 in (1.73 m)	Sr	Norfolk Christian	Norfolk, VA
G	22	Lauren Harley	5 ft 8 in (1.73 m)	Fr	Blythewood	Columbia, SC
F	23	Kenya Olley	6 ft 3 in (1.91 m)	Sr	Dorman	Spartanburg, SC
G	24	Grace Hunter	5 ft 9 in (1.75 m)	So	Athens Drive	Raleigh, NC
F	30	Jaida Robinson	6 ft 2 in (1.88 m)	RS Fr	Albemarle	Albemarle, NC
F	34	Dara Pearson	6 ft 3 in (1.91 m)	RS Fr	Hampton	Hampton, VA
G	44	Amaya Ransom	5 ft 11 in (1.8 m)	Jr	Landstown	Virginia Beach, VA

Head coach

- Cara Consuegra (Iowa)

Assistant coach(es)

- Joanne Aluka-White (Middle Tennessee)
- Randi Henderson (Iowa)
- Nicole Woods (Belmont Abbey)

Legend

- (C) Team captain
- (S) Suspended
- (I) Ineligible
- (W) Walk-on
- Injured
- Current redshirt

Roster

== Rankings ==
Regular season polls
Poll	Pre- Season	Week 2	Week 3	Week 4	Week 5	Week 6	Week 7	Week 8	Week 9	Week 10	Week 11	Week 12	Week 13	Week 14	Week 15	Week 16	Week 17	Week 18	Week 19	Final
AP	NR	NR	NR	NR	NR	NR	NR	NR	NR	RV	NR	RV	NR	NR	NR					
Coaches	NR	NR	NR	NR	NR	NR	NR	NR	NR	NR	NR	NR	NR	NR	NR					

Legend
	Increase in ranking
	Decrease in ranking
	No change
(RV)	Received votes

== Schedule ==
Date time, TV	Rank^{#}	Opponent^{#}	Result	Record	Site (attendance) city, state
Exhibition
11/03/2016*; 7:00 pm		Pfeiffer	W 94–25		Dale F. Halton Arena; Charlotte, NC
Non-conference regular season
11/11/2016*; 5:30 pm, UNC Charlotte TV		Wisconsin	W 63–48	1–0	Dale F. Halton Arena (4,866); Charlotte, NC
11/13/2016*; 2:00 pm		at College of Charleston	W 62–49	2–0	TD Arena (456); Charleston, SC
11/16/2016*; 7:00 pm, ACC Extra		at No. 22 Miami (FL)	L 46–80	2–1	Watsco Center (582); Coral Gables, FL
11/20/2016*; 2:00 pm		Presbyterian	W 71–63	3–1	Dale F. Halton Arena (1,021); Charlotte, NC
11/25/2016*; 3:00 pm		vs. Utah; Hilton Concord Thanksgiving Classic	L 68–81	3–2	McKeon Pavilion (160); Moraga, CA
11/26/2016*; 3:00 pm		vs. Boise State; Hilton Concord Thanksgiving Classic	L 65–68	3–3	McKeon Pavilion (106); Moraga, CA
12/01/2016*; 7:00 pm, UNC Charlotte TV		East Carolina	W 79–64	4–3	Dale F. Halton Arena (671); Charlotte, NC
12/04/2016*; 2:00 pm, ACC Extra		at Pittsburgh	W 70–63	5–3	Peterson Events Center (825); Pittsburgh, PA
12/06/2016*; 5:00 pm		at Duquesne	W 77–63	6–3	Palumbo Center (734); Pittsburgh, PA
12/11/2016*; 4:00 pm		Longwood	W 52–49	7–3	Dale F. Halton Arena (338); Charlotte, NC
12/21/2016*; 6:30 pm, UNC Charlotte TV		Davidson	W 93–79	8–3	Dale F. Halton Arena (745); Charlotte, NC
Conference USA regular season
12/30/2016; 8:00 pm		at North Texas	W 78–63	9–3 (1–0)	The Super Pit (1,283); Denton, TX
01/01/2017; 2:00 pm		at Rice	W 69–51	10–3 (2–0)	Tudor Fieldhouse (322); Houston, TX
01/05/2017; 11:00 am		WKU	W 89–85 ^{OT}	11–3 (3–0)	Dale F. Halton Arena (4,518); Charlotte, NC
01/07/2017; 7:00 pm, beIN		Marshall	W 93–77	12–3 (4–0)	Dale F. Halton Arena (338); Charlotte, NC
01/12/2017; 7:30 pm		Louisiana Tech	L 54–80	12–4 (4–1)	Thomas Assembly Center (1,612); Ruston, LA
01/14/2017; 5:00 pm		at Southern Miss	W 78–61	13–4 (5–1)	Reed Green Coliseum (1,540); Hattiesburg, MS
01/21/2017; 4:00 pm		at Old Dominion	W 86–75	14–4 (6–1)	Ted Constant Convocation Center (2,166); Norfolk, VA
01/26/2017; 7:00 pm, UNC Charlotte TV		North Texas	W 66–49	15–4 (7–1)	Dale F. Halton Arena (1,163); Charlotte, NC
01/28/2017; 7:00 pm, ESPN3		Rice	L 52–55	15–5 (7–2)	Dale F. Halton Arena (1,464); Charlotte, NC
02/02/2017; 7:00 pm		at Florida Atlantic	W 72–66	16–5 (8–2)	FAU Arena (708); Boca Raton, FL
02/04/2017; 2:00 pm		at FIU	W 101–54	17–5 (9–2)	FIU Arena (374); Miami, FL
02/09/2017; 7:00 pm, ESPN3		UAB	L 81–88	17–6 (9–3)	Dale F. Halton Arena (548); Charlotte, NC
02/11/2017; 7:00 pm, ESPN3		Middle Tennessee	L 81–83	17–7 (9–4)	Dale F. Halton Arena (1,650); Charlotte, NC
02/19/2017; 1:00 pm, ASN/WCCB		Old Dominion	L 70–72	17–8 (9–5)	Dale F. Halton Arena (907); Charlotte, NC
02/23/2017; 8:00 pm		at WKU	L 74–75	17–9 (9–6)	E. A. Diddle Arena (1,344); Bowling Green, KY
02/25/2017; 1:00 pm		at Marshall	W 89–75	18–9 (10–6)	Cam Henderson Center (487); Morgantown, WV
03/02/2017; 7:00 pm, ESPN3		UTSA	W 78–67	19–9 (11–6)	Dale F. Halton Arena (754); Charlotte, NC
03/04/2017; 7:00 pm, ESPN3		UTEP	W 84–74	20–9 (12–6)	Dale F. Halton Arena (1,571); Charlotte, NC
Conference USA Women's Tournament
03/08/2017; 4:00 pm		vs. Marshall; First Round	W 71–66	21–9	Bartow Arena (820); Birmingham, AL
03/09/2017; 4:00 pm		vs. Louisiana Tech; Quarterfinals	L 55–66	21–10	Bartow Arena (686); Birmingham, AL
*Non-conference game. ^{#}Rankings from AP Poll. (#) Tournament seedings in parentheses. All times are in Eastern Time.

== See also ==
2016–17 Charlotte 49ers men's basketball team
