= 2016–17 UAB Blazers women's basketball team =

Intercollegiate basketball season

2016–17 UAB Blazers women's basketball
- Conference: Conference USA
- Record: 15–15 (8–10 C-USA)
- Head coach: Randy Norton (4th season)
- Assistant coaches: Taren Martin; Michael Scott Jr.; Reagan Miller
- Home arena: Bartow Arena

2016–17 Conference USA women's basketball standings
	Conf.				Overall
Team	W		L	PCT	W		L	PCT
WKU †	16	–	2	.889	27	–	8	.771
Middle Tennessee	15	–	3	.833	23	–	11	.676
Southern Miss	13	–	5	.722	23	–	11	.676
Charlotte	12	–	6	.667	21	–	10	.677
Louisiana Tech	12	–	6	.667	18	–	14	.563
Old Dominion	11	–	7	.611	17	–	14	.548
UTSA	10	–	8	.556	14	–	17	.452
Rice	8	–	10	.444	22	–	13	.629
UAB	8	–	10	.444	15	–	15	.500
North Texas	8	–	10	.444	12	–	19	.387
Marshall	5	–	13	.278	13	–	17	.433
UTEP	5	–	13	.278	8	–	23	.258
FIU	3	–	15	.167	5	–	24	.172
Florida Atlantic	0	–	18	.000	4	–	25	.138
† 2017 C-USA Tournament winner As of March 26, 2017; Rankings from AP poll

The 2016–17 UAB Blazers women's basketball team represented the University of Alabama at Birmingham during the 2016–17 NCAA Division I women's basketball season. The Blazers, led by fourth year head coach Randy Norton, played their home games at the Bartow Arena and are members of Conference USA. They finished the season 15–15, 8–10 in C-USA play to finish in a three-way tie for eighth place. As the No. 10 seed in the Conference USA Tournament, they were defeated in the first round by North Texas.

== Roster ==
2016–17 UAB Blazers women's basketball team
Players
Coaches

Pos.	#	Name	Height	Year	Previous school	Hometown
G	0	Miyah Barnes	5 ft 5 in (1.65 m)	Fr	Central HS	Memphis, TN
G	2	Whytney Singleton	5 ft 6 in (1.68 m)	Jr	Blount HS	Mobile, AL
G	3	Angela Vendrell	6 ft 2 in (1.88 m)	Fr	CB Claret Benimaclet	Alicante, Spain
G	4	Micah Scheetz	5 ft 8 in (1.73 m)	Fr	Webb HS	Knoxville, TN
G	11	Janeka Williams	5 ft 6 in (1.68 m)	Sr	East HS	Memphis, TN
F	12	Keonna Farmer	6 ft 0 in (1.83 m)	RS Jr	Auburn	Birmingham, AL
F	13	Katelynn Thomas	6 ft 0 in (1.83 m)	Fr	Shades Valley HS	Birmingham, AL
G	14	T'erra Lewis	5 ft 6 in (1.68 m)	Jr	Robert E. Lee HS	Montgomery, AL
G	20	Deanna Kuzmanic	5 ft 9 in (1.75 m)	So	Wheeling HS	Wheeling, IL
G	22	Maya Garland	5 ft 6 in (1.68 m)	Jr	Fenwick HS	River Forest, IL
G	23	Lea Kerstein	5 ft 8 in (1.73 m)	Fr	Montini Catholic HS	West Chicago, IL
G/F	24	Kara Rawls	6 ft 1 in (1.85 m)	Jr	Lawson State CC	Hoover, AL
G	32	Rachael Childress	5 ft 10 in (1.78 m)	Fr	Lawrence County HS	Moulton, AL
F	34	Imani Johnson	6 ft 0 in (1.83 m)	Fr	Desoto Central HS	Southaven, MS
F	40	Bailee Wolfe	6 ft 3 in (1.91 m)	RS Fr	Bartow HS	Lakeland, FL

Head coach

- Randy Norton (Iowa)

Assistant coach(es)

- Taren Martin (Illinois State)
- Michael Scott Jr. (Missouri)
- Reagan Miller (Liberty)

Legend

- (C) Team captain
- (S) Suspended
- (I) Ineligible
- (W) Walk-on
- Injured
- Current redshirt

Roster

== Schedule ==
Date time, TV	Rank^{#}	Opponent^{#}	Result	Record	Site (attendance) city, state
Exhibition
11/03/2016*; 5:00 pm		Tuskegee	W 88–67		Bartow Arena; Birmingham, AL
11/07/2016*; 7:00 pm		Lane College	W 96–48		Bartow Arena; Birmingham, AL
Non-conference regular season
11/11/2016*; 6:00 pm		vs. Gardner–Webb; Maggie Dixon Classic semifinals	W 59–49	1–0	McGrath-Phillips Arena; Chicago, IL
11/12/2016*; 8:00 pm		at DePaul; Maggie Dixon Classic championship	L 80–90	1–1	McGrath-Phillips Arena (2,056); Chicago, IL
11/19/2016*; 2:00 pm		Belmont	L 58–72	1–2	Bartow Arena; Birmingham, AL
11/22/2016*; 7:00 pm		High Point	W 75–66	2–2	Bartow Arena (337); Birmingham, AL
11/28/2016*; 7:00 pm		Mississippi Valley State	W 80–46	3–2	Bartow Arena (295); Birmingham, AL
12/03/2016*; 2:00 pm, ESPN3		at Southern Illinois	W 64–49	4–2	SIU Arena (500); Carbondale, IL
12/08/2016*; 7:00 pm, ESPN3		at Samford	L 49–52	4–3	Pete Hanna Center (681); Homewood, AL
12/10/2016*; 2:00 pm		No. 7 Florida State	L 47–93	4–4	Bartow Arena (457); Birmingham, AL
12/18/2016*; 2:00 pm		at Troy	W 81–77	5–4	Trojan Arena (675); Troy, AL
12/21/2016*; 1:00 pm		South Alabama	W 66–41	6–4	Bartow Arena (540); Birmingham, AL
12/28/2016*; 1:00 pm		Miles College	W 106–48	7–4	Bartow Arena (307); Birmingham, AL
Conference USA regular season
01/01/2017; 2:00 pm		Middle Tennessee	L 61–64	7–5 (0–1)	Bartow Arena (293); Birmingham, AL
01/05/2017; 7:00 pm		North Texas	L 58–59 ^{OT}	7–6 (0–2)	Bartow Arena (522); Birmingham, AL
01/08/2017; 2:00 pm		Rice; Postponed from 01/07/2017	W 62–61 ^{OT}	8–6 (1–2)	Bartow Arena (284); Birmingham, AL
01/12/2017; 11:00 am		at WKU	L 48–60	8–7 (1–3)	E. A. Diddle Arena (4,215); Bowling Green, KY
01/14/2017; 12:00 pm		at Marshall	L 58–61	8–8 (1–4)	Cam Henderson Center (593); Huntington, WV
01/19/2017; 7:00 pm		Florida Atlantic	W 66–55	9–8 (2–4)	Bartow Arena (271); Burlington, WV
02/21/2017; 2:00 pm		FIU	W 82–68	10–8 (3–4)	Bartow Arena (629); Burlington, WV
01/26/2017; 6:30 pm		at Louisiana Tech	L 63–64	10–9 (3–5)	Thomas Assembly Center (1,526); Ruston, LA
01/28/2017; 4:00 pm		at Southern Miss	L 59–64	10–10 (3–6)	Reed Green Coliseum (1,560); Hattiesburg, PA
02/02/2017; 7:00 pm		UTEP	W 74–61	11–10 (4–6)	Bartow Arena (376); Birmingham, AL
02/04/2017; 2:00 pm		UTSA	L 67–82	11–11 (4–7)	Bartow Arena (338); Birmingham, AL
02/09/2017; 6:00 pm, ESPN3		at Charlotte	W 88–81	12–11 (5–7)	Dale F. Halton Arena (548); Charlotte, NC
02/11/2017; 3:00 pm		at Old Dominion	L 61–73	12–12 (5–8)	Ted Constant Convocation Center (3,129); Norfolk, VA
02/16/2017; 7:00 pm		Marshall	W 71–55	13–12 (6–8)	Bartow Arena (248); Birmingham, AL
02/18/2017; 2:00 pm		WKU	L 52–62	13–13 (6–9)	Bartow Arena (399); Birmingham, AL
02/26/2017; 4:00 pm, ASN		at Middle Tennessee	L 56–87	13–14 (6–10)	Murphy Center (3,505); Murfreesboro, TN
03/02/2017; 6:00 pm		at Florida Atlantic	W 78–75	14–14 (7–10)	FAU Arena (445); Boca Raton, FL
03/04/2017; 1:00 pm		at FIU	W 61-52	15-14 (8-10)	FIU Arena (820); Miami, FL
Conference USA Women's Tournament
03/08/2017; 12:30 pm, CI	(9)	vs. (8) North Texas; First Round	L 62-65 ^{2OT}	15-15 (8-10)	Bartow Arena; Birmingham, AL
*Non-conference game. ^{#}Rankings from AP Poll. (#) Tournament seedings in parentheses. All times are in Central Time.

== See also ==
- 2016–17 UAB Blazers men's basketball team
