= 2016–17 UTSA Roadrunners women's basketball team =

Intercollegiate basketball season

2016–17 UTSA Roadrunners women's basketball
- Conference: Conference USA
- Record: 14–17 (10–8 C-USA)
- Head coach: Lubomyr Lichonczak (4th season)
- Assistant coaches: Kristen Holt; Nicole Dunson; Ela Mukosiej
- Home arena: Convocation Center

2016–17 Conference USA women's basketball standings
	Conf.				Overall
Team	W		L	PCT	W		L	PCT
WKU †	16	–	2	.889	27	–	8	.771
Middle Tennessee	15	–	3	.833	23	–	11	.676
Southern Miss	13	–	5	.722	23	–	11	.676
Charlotte	12	–	6	.667	21	–	10	.677
Louisiana Tech	12	–	6	.667	18	–	14	.563
Old Dominion	11	–	7	.611	17	–	14	.548
UTSA	10	–	8	.556	14	–	17	.452
Rice	8	–	10	.444	22	–	13	.629
UAB	8	–	10	.444	15	–	15	.500
North Texas	8	–	10	.444	12	–	19	.387
Marshall	5	–	13	.278	13	–	17	.433
UTEP	5	–	13	.278	8	–	23	.258
FIU	3	–	15	.167	5	–	24	.172
Florida Atlantic	0	–	18	.000	4	–	25	.138
† 2017 C-USA Tournament winner As of March 26, 2017; Rankings from AP poll

The 2016–17 UTSA Roadrunners women's basketball team represented the University of Texas at San Antonio during the 2016–17 NCAA Division I women's basketball season.

The Roadrunners, led by fourth year head coach Lubomyr Lichonczak, played their home games at the Convocation Center and were fourth year members of Conference USA. They finished the season 14–17, 10–8 in C-USA play to finish in seventh place. They lost in the first round of the C-USA women's tournament to Rice.

== Roster ==
2016–17 UTSA Roadrunners women's basketball team
Players
Coaches

Pos.	#	Name	Height	Year	Previous school	Hometown
F	1	Kasia Kiejdrowska	6 ft 0 in (1.83 m)	Sr	Mineral Area College	Grudziądz, Poland
G	3	Alexus Dukes	5 ft 6 in (1.68 m)	So	Harker Heights HS	Harker Heights, TX
G	4	Crystal Chidomere	5 ft 11 in (1.8 m)	Jr	Bush HS	Richmond, TX
G	13	Deja Cousin	5 ft 9 in (1.75 m)	Fr	The Burlington School	Burlington, NC
F	15	Tîmea Tóth	6 ft 1 in (1.85 m)	Fr	Dunakeszi Radnóti Miklos Gimnáziuma	Dunakeszi, Hungary
F	20	Kourtney Kekec	5 ft 10 in (1.78 m)	So	North County HS; Mineral Area JC	Bonne Terre, MO
F	21	Marie Benson	6 ft 1 in (1.85 m)	Fr	Midland HS	Waco, TX
F	23	Tija Hawkins	6 ft 1 in (1.85 m)	Fr	Shoemaker HS	Killeen, TX
C	30	Tesha Smith	6 ft 1 in (1.85 m)	Sr	Wagner HS	San Antonio, TX
G	31	Carlie Henieman	6 ft 0 in (1.83 m)	Jr	Brennan HS	San Antonio, TX
G	32	Dwanisha Tate	5 ft 9 in (1.75 m)	RS Jr	Seguin HS	Arlington, TX

Head coach

- Lubomyr Lichonczak (Idaho)

Assistant coach(es)

- Kristen Holt (Ohio)
- Nicole Dunson (Texas–San Antonio)
- Ela Mukosiej (Seton Hall)

Legend

- (C) Team captain
- (S) Suspended
- (I) Ineligible
- (W) Walk-on
- Injured
- Current redshirt

Roster

== Schedule ==
Date time, TV	Rank^{#}	Opponent^{#}	Result	Record	Site (attendance) city, state
Exhibition
10/28/2016*; 7:00 pm		Texas A&M International	W 75–34		Convocation Center; San Antonio, TX
11/05/2016*; 2:00 pm		Trinity	W 91–67		Convocation Center; San Antonio, TX
Non-conference regular season
11/11/2016*; 7:00 pm		Angelo State	L 77–85	0–1	Convocation Center (395); San Antonio, TX
11/13/2015*; 2:00 pm		at Texas–Arlington	L 54–75	0–2	College Park Center (592); Arlington, TX
11/17/2016*; 7:00 pm		Texas A&M–Kingsville	W 70–44	1–2	Convocation Center (256); San Antonio, TX
11/20/2016*; 4:00 pm		at Oregon	L 63–77	1–3	Matthew Knight Arena (1,917); Eugene, OR
11/25/2016*; 4:15 pm		Northern Colorado; UTSA Thanksgiving Classic	L 66–73	1–4	Convocation Center (1,057); San Antonio, TX
11/27/2016*; 2:15 pm		Tulane; UTSA Thanksgiving Classic	L 66–75	1–5	Convocation Center (544); San Antonio, TX
11/29/2015*; 7:00 pm		Abilene Christian	W 71–68	2–5	Convocation Center (392); San Antonio, TX
12/01/2016*; 7:00 pm		Texas State; I-35 Rivalry	W 72–47	3–5	Convocation Center (345); San Antonio, TX
12/17/2015*; 5:00 pm, LHN		at No. 16 Texas	L 61–85	3–6	Frank Erwin Center (2,962); Austin, TX
12/19/2016*; 4:00 pm		Houston; Rae & Craig Blair Memorial Tournament	L 49–56	3–7	Convocation Center (200); San Antonio, TX
12/20/2016*; 6:15 pm		Liberty; Rae & Craig Blair Memorial Tournament	W 80–64	4–7	Convocation Center (341); San Antonio, TX
Conference USA regular season
01/01/2017; 3:00 pm		at UTEP	W 83–81 ^{OT}	5–7 (1–0)	Don Haskins Center (1,316); El Paso, TX
01/05/2017; 7:00 pm		Southern Miss	L 68–69	5–8 (1–1)	Convocation Center (203); San Antonio, TX
01/07/2017; 2:00 pm		Louisiana Tech	W 63–61	6–8 (2–1)	Convocation Center (252); San Antonio, TX
01/12/2017; 6:00 pm		at Florida Atlantic	W 72–62	7–8 (3–1)	FAU Arena (665); Boca Raton, FL
01/14/2017; 1:00 pm		at FIU	W 70–61	8–8 (4–1)	FIU Arena (408); Miami, FL
01/21/2017; 2:00 pm		UTEP	W 97–76	9–8 (5–1)	Convocation Center (309); San Antonio, TX
01/26/2017; 7:00 pm		Marshall	L 81–88	9–9 (5–2)	Convocation Center (324); San Antonio, TX
01/28/2017; 2:00 pm		WKU	W 80–77	10–9 (6–2)	Convocation Center (359); San Antonio, TX
02/02/2017; 6:30 pm, ESPN3		at Middle Tennessee	L 63–77	10–10 (6–3)	Murphy Center (3,152); Murfreesboro, TN
02/04/2017; 2:00 pm		at UAB	W 82–67	11–10 (7–3)	Bartow Arena (338); Birmingham, AL
02/09/2017; 6:00 pm		at Southern Miss	L 71–74	11–11 (7–4)	Reed Green Coliseum (1,360); Hattiesburg, MS
02/11/2017; 1:00 pm		at Louisiana Tech	L 71–77	11–12 (7–5)	Thomas Assembly Center (1,934); Ruston, LA
02/16/2017; 7:00 pm		Rice	L 61–66	11–13 (7–6)	Convocation Center (386); San Antonio, TX
02/18/2017; 2:00 pm		North Texas	L 55–58 ^{OT}	11–14 (7–7)	Convocation Center (606); San Antonio, TX
02/23/2017; 7:00 pm		FIU	W 69–55	12–14 (8–7)	Convocation Center (655); San Antonio, TX
02/25/2017; 2:00 pm		Florida Atlantic	W 97–66	13–14 (9–7)	Convocation Center (507); San Antonio, TX
03/02/2017; 6:00 pm, ESPN3		at Charlotte	L 67–78	13–15 (9–8)	Dale F. Halton Arena (754); Charlotte, NC
03/04/2017; 12:00 pm, ESPN3		at Old Dominion	W 81–68	14–16 (10–8)	Ted Constant Convocation Center (2,535); Norfolk, VA
C-USA Women's Tournament
03/08/2017; 6:30 pm		vs. Rice; First Round	L 63–75	14–17	Bartow Arena (1,001); Birmingham, AL
*Non-conference game. ^{#}Rankings from AP Poll. (#) Tournament seedings in parentheses. All times are in Central Time.

== See also ==
2016–17 UTSA Roadrunners men's basketball team
