= 2016–17 Old Dominion Monarchs women's basketball team =

Intercollegiate basketball season

2016–17 Old Dominion Monarchs women's basketball
- Conference: Conference USA
- Record: 17–14 (11–7 C-USA)
- Head coach: Karen Barefoot (6th season)
- Assistant coaches: Jim Corrigan (4th season); Jermaine Woods (2nd season); Ashley Langford (1st season)
- Captains: Jennie Simms; Destinee Young
- Home arena: Ted Constant Convocation Center

2016–17 Conference USA women's basketball standings
	Conf.				Overall
Team	W		L	PCT	W		L	PCT
WKU †	16	–	2	.889	27	–	8	.771
Middle Tennessee	15	–	3	.833	23	–	11	.676
Southern Miss	13	–	5	.722	23	–	11	.676
Charlotte	12	–	6	.667	21	–	10	.677
Louisiana Tech	12	–	6	.667	18	–	14	.563
Old Dominion	11	–	7	.611	17	–	14	.548
UTSA	10	–	8	.556	14	–	17	.452
Rice	8	–	10	.444	22	–	13	.629
UAB	8	–	10	.444	15	–	15	.500
North Texas	8	–	10	.444	12	–	19	.387
Marshall	5	–	13	.278	13	–	17	.433
UTEP	5	–	13	.278	8	–	23	.258
FIU	3	–	15	.167	5	–	24	.172
Florida Atlantic	0	–	18	.000	4	–	25	.138
† 2017 C-USA Tournament winner As of March 26, 2017; Rankings from AP poll

The 2016–17 Old Dominion Monarchs women’s basketball team represented Old Dominion University during the 2016–17 NCAA Division I women's basketball season. The Monarchs, led by sixth year head coach Karen Barefoot, played their home games at Ted Constant Convocation Center as members of Conference USA.

Old Dominion finished the season 17–14 overall with a record of 11–7 in conference play. They lost to Southern Miss in the conference tournament quarterfinals.

Team captain Jennie Simms was named the 2016–17 C-USA player of the year.

== Roster ==
2016–17 Old Dominion Monarchs women's basketball team
Players
Coaches

Pos.	#	Name	Height	Year	Previous school	Hometown
G	0	Rhaven Kemp	5 ft 6 in (1.68 m)	Sr	Liberty Technology Magnet / Eastern Florida State	Jackson, TN
F	1	Manaya Jones	6 ft 4 in (1.93 m)	Fr	Raleigh-Egypt	Memphis, TN
G	2	MaKayla Timmons	5 ft 7 in (1.7 m)	So	Columbia Central	Columbia, TN
G	3	Carolina Bernardeco	5 ft 6 in (1.68 m)	So	Escola Secundária de Santo André	Lisbon, Portugal
F	4	Jessica Munoz	6 ft 2 in (1.88 m)	Fr	Central Heights	Nacogdoches, TX
G	5	Gianna Smith	5 ft 10 in (1.78 m)	So	Lake Taylor	Norfolk, VA
G	12	Kelly Loftus (I) (redshirt)	5 ft 10 in (1.78 m)	Sr	Mount Vernon / Hofstra	Alexandria, Virginia
F	14	Annika Holopainen	6 ft 1 in (1.85 m)	RS Sr	Makelanrinteen Lukio	Helsinki, Finland
G	20	Keyana Brown	5 ft 11 in (1.8 m)	Jr	Lafayette	Williamsburg, VA
C	23	Ije Ajemba	6 ft 3 in (1.91 m)	Sr	Parkdale	Lanham, MD
G	24	LaQuanda Younger	5 ft 10 in (1.78 m)	Sr	Warwick	Newport News, VA
F	24	Carley Brew (I) (redshirt)	6 ft 0 in (1.83 m)	Jr	Wilson / James Madison	Wyomissing, PA
F	25	Jennie Simms (C)	6 ft 0 in (1.83 m)	RS Sr	Riverdale Baptist / West Virginia	Accokeek, MD
G	30	Ashley Jackson	5 ft 9 in (1.75 m)	Jr	Ridgeway	Memphis, TN
F	34	Odegua Oigbokie	6 ft 1 in (1.85 m)	RS Jr	Ridgeway	Memphis, TN
F	40	Destinee Young (C)	6 ft 1 in (1.85 m)	Sr	Hoffman Estates	Hoffman Estates, IL

Head coach

- Karen Barefoot (Christopher Newport)

Assistant coach(es)

- Jim Corrigan (Duke)
- Jermaine Woods (Christopher Newport)
- Ashley Langford (Tulane)

Legend

- (C) Team captain
- (S) Suspended
- (I) Ineligible
- (W) Walk-on
- Injured
- Current redshirt

Roster
Last update: November 27, 2016

== Schedule ==
Date time, TV	Rank^{#}	Opponent^{#}	Result	Record	High points	High rebounds	High assists	Site (attendance) city, state
Exhibition
November 1*; 7:00 pm		Davis & Elkins	W 82–65	–	37 – Simms	10 – Young	5 – Simms	Ted Constant Convocation Center; Norfolk, VA
Non-conference regular season
November 18*; 7:00 pm		Norfolk State; Rivalry	W 65–54	1–0	20 – Young (1)	14 – Simms (1)	3 – 4 tied	Ted Constant Convocation Center (1,376); Norfolk, VA
November 20*; 2:00 pm		William & Mary; Rivalry	L 58–69	1–1	28 – Simms (1)	12 – Young (1)	3 – Simms (2)	Ted Constant Convocation Center (1,089); Norfolk, VA
November 22*; 7:00 pm		at Duke	L 64–92	1–2	33 – Simms (2)	7 – 2 tied	3 – Bernardeco (2)	Cameron Indoor Stadium (3,136); Durham, NC
November 27*; 2:00 pm		North Carolina Central	W 83–52	2–2	17 – 2 tied	11 – Young (3)	6 – Kemp (1)	Ted Constant Convocation Center (769); Norfolk, VA
November 30*; 11:00 am		Dartmouth	W 82–56	3–2	35 – Simms (4)	13 – Young (4)	5 – Simms (3)	Ted Constant Convocation Center (8,563); Norfolk, VA
December 4*; 2:00 pm		at No. 18 Miami (FL)	L 56–66	3–3	24 – Simms (5)	13 – Young (5)	3 – 3 tied	Watsco Center (537); Coral Gables, FL
December 9*; 7:00 pm		VCU	W 70–60	4–3	29 – Simms (6)	12 – Young (6)	5 – Simms (5)	Ted Constant Convocation Center (1,470); Norfolk, VA
December 18*; 5:00 pm		Hampton	W 61–58	5–3	28 – Simms (7)	17 – Simms (2)	4 – Timmons (1)	Ted Constant Convocation Center (1,300); Norfolk, VA
December 20*; 3:15 pm		vs. No. 19 Syracuse; Florida Sunshine Classic	L 66–92	5–4	14 – Brown (1)	7 – Young (7)	5 – 2 tied	Worden Arena (335); Winter Haven, FL
December 21*; 1:00 pm		vs. Dayton; Florida Sunshine Classic	L 69–77	5–5	32 – Simms (8)	11 – Young (8)	4 – Timmons (2)	Worden Arena (387); Winter Haven, FL
December 28*; 7:00 pm		at East Tennessee State	L 60–70	5–6	17 – Simms (9)	14 – Young (9)	4 – 4 tied	Freedom Hall Civic Center (634); Johnson City, TN
C-USA regular season
December 30; 8:00 pm		at Rice	W 59–47	6–6 (1–0)	26 – Simms (10)	13 – Young (10)	3 – Simms (8)	Tudor Fieldhouse (393); Houston, TX
January 1; 4:00 pm		at North Texas	L 55–65	6–7 (1–1)	14 – Simms (11)	11 – Young (11)	6 – Simms (9)	The Super Pit (811); Denton, TX
January 5; 7:00 pm		Marshall	W 73–69	7–7 (2–1)	43 – Simms (12)	9 – Young (12)	4 – 2 tied	Ted Constant Convocation Center (1,575); Norfolk, VA
January 7; 4:00 pm, ESPN3		WKU	L 62–67	7–8 (2–2)	17 – Jackson (1)	13 – Young (13)	4 – Bernardeco (3)	Ted Constant Convocation Center (1,290); Norfolk, VA
January 12; 7:00 pm		at Southern Miss	L 69–84	7–9 (2–3)	19 – Simms (13)	7 – Simms (3)	5 – Simms (10)	Reed Green Coliseum (13); Hattiesburg, MS
January 14; 2:00 pm		at Louisiana Tech	W 69–64	8–9 (3–3)	24 – Simms (14)	9 – Young (14)	7 – Simms (11)	Thomas Assembly Center (2,081); Ruston, LA
January 21; 4:00 pm		Charlotte	L 75–86	8–10 (3–4)	33 – Simms (15)	15 – Young (15)	3 – Simms (12)	Ted Constant Convocation Center (2,166); Norfolk, VA
January 26; 7:00 pm		Rice	W 81–66	9–10 (4–4)	34 – Simms (16)	11 – Young (16)	5 – Simms (13)	Ted Constant Convocation Center (1,627); Norfolk, VA
January 28; 7:00 pm		North Texas	W 62–47	10–10 (5–4)	17 – Holopainen (1)	8 – 3 Tied	5 – Timmons (5)	Ted Constant Convocation Center (1,827); Norfolk, VA
February 2; 7:00 pm		at FIU	W 86–64	11–10 (6–4)	32 – Simms (17)	11 – Young (18)	6 – Simms (14)	FIU Arena (338); Miami, FL
February 4; 5:00 pm		at Florida Atlantic	W 93–73	12–10 (7–4)	41 – Simms (18)	14 – Young (19)	6 – Simms (15)	FAU Arena (409); Boca Raton, FL
February 9; 7:00 pm, beIN		Middle Tennessee	L 63–80	12–11 (7–5)	19 – Simms (19)	14 – Young (20)	5 – Simms (16)	Ted Constant Convocation Center (1,578); Norfolk, VA
February 11; 4:00 pm		UAB	W 73–61	13–11 (8–5)	22 – Simms (20)	11 – Young (21)	10 – Simms (17)	Ted Constant Convocation Center (3,129); Norfolk, VA
February 19; 12:00 pm, ASN		at Charlotte	W 72–70	14–11 (9–5)	23 – Simms (21)	15 – Young (22)	7 – Simms (18)	Dale F. Halton Arena (907); Charlotte, NC
February 23; 7:00 pm		at Marshall	W 94–85	15–11 (10–5)	33 – Simms (22)	7 – 3 tied	9 – Simms (19)	Cam Henderson Center (336); Huntington, WV
February 25; 3:00 pm		at WKU	L 73–79	15–12 (10–6)	18 – Tied	11 – Young (24)	4 – Simms (20)	E. A. Diddle Arena (2,217); Bowling Green, KY
March 2; 7:00 pm, beIN		UTEP	W 87–68	16–12 (11–6)	30 – Simms (24)	14 – Young (25)	7 – Simms (21)	Ted Constant Convocation Center (1,138); Norfolk, VA
March 4; 1:00 pm		UTSA	L 68–81	16–13 (11–7)	31 – Simms (25)	10 – Holopainen (2)	4 – Holopainen (1)	Ted Constant Convocation Center (2,535); Norfolk, VA
C-USA Tournament
March 8; 10:00 pm, CI	(6)	vs. (11) UTEP; First Round	W 80–70	17–13	29 – Simms (26)	9 – Simms (6)	3 – Tied	Legacy Arena (820); Birmingham, AL
March 9; 10:00 pm, CI	(6)	vs. No. 3 Southern Miss; Quarterfinals	L 74–80	17–14	33 – Simms (27)	11 – Holopainen (3)	6 – Simms (23)	Legacy Arena (686); Birmingham, AL
*Non-conference game. ^{#}Rankings from AP Poll. (#) Tournament seedings in parentheses. All times are in Eastern Time.

- Source: Old Dominion Athletics

== Rankings ==
Ranking movement Legend: ██ Increase in ranking. ██ Decrease in ranking. RV=Received votes.
Poll	Pre	Wk 2	Wk 3	Wk 4	Wk 5	Wk 6	Wk 7	Wk 8	Wk 9	Wk 10	Wk 11	Wk 12	Wk 13	Wk 14	Wk 15	Wk 16	Wk 17	Wk 18	Post	Final
AP	NR	NR	NR	NR	NR	NR	NR	NR	NR	NR										N/A*
Coaches	NR	NR	NR	NR	NR	NR	NR	NR	NR	NR										

*First place votes in parentheses
*AP does not release post-tournament rankings

== See also ==
2016–17 Old Dominion Monarchs men's basketball team
