= 2016–17 Marshall Thundering Herd women's basketball team =

Intercollegiate basketball season

2016–17 Marshall Thundering Herd women's basketball
- Conference: Conference USA
- Record: 13–17 (5–13 C-USA)
- Head coach: Matt Daniel (4th season)
- Assistant coaches: Tony Kemper; Caronica Randle; Stephanie Stoglin-Reed
- Home arena: Cam Henderson Center

2016–17 Conference USA women's basketball standings
	Conf.				Overall
Team	W		L	PCT	W		L	PCT
WKU †	16	–	2	.889	27	–	8	.771
Middle Tennessee	15	–	3	.833	23	–	11	.676
Southern Miss	13	–	5	.722	23	–	11	.676
Charlotte	12	–	6	.667	21	–	10	.677
Louisiana Tech	12	–	6	.667	18	–	14	.563
Old Dominion	11	–	7	.611	17	–	14	.548
UTSA	10	–	8	.556	14	–	17	.452
Rice	8	–	10	.444	22	–	13	.629
UAB	8	–	10	.444	15	–	15	.500
North Texas	8	–	10	.444	12	–	19	.387
Marshall	5	–	13	.278	13	–	17	.433
UTEP	5	–	13	.278	8	–	23	.258
FIU	3	–	15	.167	5	–	24	.172
Florida Atlantic	0	–	18	.000	4	–	25	.138
† 2017 C-USA Tournament winner As of March 26, 2017; Rankings from AP poll

The 2016–17 Marshall Thundering Herd women's basketball team represented the Marshall University during the 2016–17 NCAA Division I women's basketball season. The Thundering Herd, led by fourth year head coach Matt Daniel, played their home games at the Cam Henderson Center and were members of Conference USA. They finished the season 13–17, 5–13 for in C-USA play to finish in a tie for 11th place. They lost in the first round of the C-USA women's tournament to Charlotte.

== Roster ==
2016–17 Marshall Thundering Herd women's basketball team
Players
Coaches

Pos.	#	Name	Height	Year	Previous school	Hometown
F	0	Talequia Hamilton	6 ft 0 in (1.83 m)	RS Sr	Cincinnati	Huntington, West Virginia
F	1	Jovana Vucetic	6 ft 1 in (1.85 m)	Fr	Sunrise Christian Academy	Loznica, Serbia
G	2	Logan Fraley	5 ft 10 in (1.78 m)	So	Boyd County HS	Ashland, Kentucky
G	3	Asheika Alexander	5 ft 10 in (1.78 m)	Fr	South Gwinnett HS	Snellville, Georgia
G/F	4	Khadaijia Brooks	5 ft 10 in (1.78 m)	So	Bristol Eastern HS	Bristol, Connecticut
G	5	McKenzie Akers	5 ft 6 in (1.68 m)	RS Jr	Princeton Senior HS	Princeton, West Virginia
G	10	Ashley Saintigene	6 ft 2 in (1.88 m)	Fr	Northeast HS	Lauderdale Lakes, Florida
G	11	Taylor Porter	5 ft 8 in (1.73 m)	RS Jr	Murray State	Fort Gay, West Virginia
G/F	14	Shayna Gore	5 ft 8 in (1.73 m)	So	Logan HS	Logan, West Virginia
G	15	Tana Driver	5 ft 0 in (1.52 m)	So	MacArthur HS	Irving, Texas
G	22	Kiana Evans	6 ft 0 in (1.83 m)	Sr	Huntington HS	Huntington, West Virginia
G/F	33	Madison Morris	6 ft 0 in (1.83 m)	So	Spring Valley HS	Huntington, West Virginia

Head coach

- Matt Daniel (Harding)

Assistant coach(es)

- Tony Kemper (Fort Hays State)
- Caronica Randle (Central Arkansas)
- Stephanie Stoglin-Reed (Houston Baptist)

Legend

- (C) Team captain
- (S) Suspended
- (I) Ineligible
- (W) Walk-on
- Injured
- Current redshirt

Roster

== Rankings ==
Regular season polls
Poll	Pre- Season	Week 2	Week 3	Week 4	Week 5	Week 6	Week 7	Week 8	Week 9	Week 10	Week 11	Week 12	Week 13	Week 14	Week 15	Week 16	Week 17	Week 18	Week 19	Final
AP																				N/A
Coaches																				

Legend
	Increase in ranking
	Decrease in ranking
	No change
(RV)	Received votes

== Schedule ==
Date time, TV	Rank^{#}	Opponent^{#}	Result	Record	Site (attendance) city, state
Non-conference regular season
11/11/2016*; 12:00 pm		at Illinois	W 55–53	1–0	State Farm Center (969); Champaign, IL
11/15/2016*; 6:00 pm		Florida A&M	W 77–67	2–0	Cam Henderson Center (531); Huntington, WV
11/19/2016*; 1:00 pm		Coastal Carolina	W 84–66	3–0	Cam Henderson Center (1,327); Huntington, WV
11/25/2016*; 5:30 pm		vs. Sam Houston State; Feast on the Border	W 73–50	4–0	UTRGV Fieldhouse (134); Edinburg, TX
11/26/2016*; 5:30 pm		vs. Prairie View A&M; Feast on the Border	L 68–78	4–1	UTRGV Fieldhouse (92); Edinsburg, TX
11/30/2016*; 4:00 pm		Morgan State	W 62–43	5–1	Cam Henderson Center; Huntington, WV
12/03/2016*; 1:00 pm		at Penn State	L 80–82	5–2	Bryce Jordan Center (2,606); University Park, PA
12/07/2016*; 5:30 pm, ACCN Extra		at North Carolina	L 53–75	5–3	Carmichael Arena (1,528); Chapel Hill, NC
12/11/2016*; 1:00 pm		Bluefield College	W 77–35	6–3	Cam Henderson Center (696); Huntington, WV
12/19/2016*; 1:00 pm		Longwood	W 70–50	7–3	Cam Henderson Center (536); Huntington, WV
12/20/2016*; 1:00 pm		Maine–Fort Kent	W 136–62	8–3	Cam Henderson Center (416); Huntington, WV
Conference USA regular season
12/30/2016; 6:00 pm		FIU	W 70–52	9–3 (1–0)	Cam Henderson Center (604); Huntington, WV
01/01/2017; 1:00 pm		Florida Atlantic	W 76–53	10–3 (2–0)	Cam Henderson Center (717); Huntington, WV
01/05/2017; 7:00 pm		at Old Dominion	L 69–73	10–4 (2–1)	Ted Constant Convocation Center (1,575); Norfolk, VA
01/07/2017; 7:00 pm, beIN		at Charlotte	L 77–93	10–5 (2–2)	Dale F. Halton Arena (338); Charlotte, NC
01/12/2017; 6:00 pm		Middle Tennessee	L 63–72	10–6 (2–3)	Cam Henderson Center (517); Huntington, WV
01/14/2017; 1:00 pm		UAB	W 61–58	11–6 (3–3)	Cam Henderson Center (593); Huntington, WV
01/21/2017; 3:00 pm		at WKU	L 48–60	11–7 (3–4)	E. A. Diddle Arena (4,215); Bowling Green, KY
01/26/2017; 8:00 pm		at UTSA	W 88–81	12–7 (4–4)	Convocation Center (324); San Antonio, TX
01/28/2017; 4:00 pm		at UTEP	L 74–84	12–8 (4–5)	Don Haskins Center (1,542); El Paso, TX
02/02/2017; 6:00 pm		Southern Miss	L 78–82	12–9 (4–6)	Cam Henderson Center (613); Huntington, WV
02/04/2017; 1:00 pm		Louisiana Tech	L 64–72	12–10 (4–7)	Cam Henderson Center (1,072); Huntington, WV
02/11/2017; 1:00 pm		WKU	L 64–78	12–11 (4–8)	Cam Henderson Center (717); Huntington, WV
02/16/2017; 8:00 pm		at UAB	L 55–71	12–12 (4–9)	Bartow Arena (248); Birmingham, AL
02/18/2017; 3:00 pm, ESPN3		at Middle Tennessee	L 69–94	12–13 (4–10)	Murphy Center (3,411); Murfreesboro, TN
02/23/2017; 6:00 pm		Old Dominion	L 85–94	12–14 (4–11)	Cam Henderson Center; Huntington, WV
02/25/2017; 1:00 pm		Charlotte	L 75–89	12–15 (4–12)	Cam Henderson Center (487); Huntington, WV
03/02/2017; 8:00 pm		at Rice	L 74–84	12–16 (4–13)	Tudor Fieldhouse (430); Houston, TX
03/04/2017; 1:00 pm		at North Texas	W 60–57	13–16 (5–13)	The Super Pit (976); Denton, TX
Conference USA Women's Tournament
03/08/2017; 3:00 pm	(12)	vs. (5) Charlotte; First Round	L 66–71	13–17	Bartow Arena (820); Birmingham, AL
*Non-conference game. ^{#}Rankings from AP Poll. (#) Tournament seedings in parentheses. All times are in Eastern Time.

== See also ==
2016–17 Marshall Thundering Herd men's basketball team
