= 2016–17 UTEP Miners women's basketball team =

Intercollegiate basketball season

2016–17 UTEP Miners women's basketball
- Conference: Conference USA
- Record: 8–23 (5–13 C-USA)
- Head coach: Keitha Adams (16th season)
- Assistant coaches: Ewa Laskowska; Bill Damuth; Kelli Willingham Bagley
- Home arena: Don Haskins Center

2016–17 Conference USA women's basketball standings
	Conf.				Overall
Team	W		L	PCT	W		L	PCT
WKU †	16	–	2	.889	27	–	8	.771
Middle Tennessee	15	–	3	.833	23	–	11	.676
Southern Miss	13	–	5	.722	23	–	11	.676
Charlotte	12	–	6	.667	21	–	10	.677
Louisiana Tech	12	–	6	.667	18	–	14	.563
Old Dominion	11	–	7	.611	17	–	14	.548
UTSA	10	–	8	.556	14	–	17	.452
Rice	8	–	10	.444	22	–	13	.629
UAB	8	–	10	.444	15	–	15	.500
North Texas	8	–	10	.444	12	–	19	.387
Marshall	5	–	13	.278	13	–	17	.433
UTEP	5	–	13	.278	8	–	23	.258
FIU	3	–	15	.167	5	–	24	.172
Florida Atlantic	0	–	18	.000	4	–	25	.138
† 2017 C-USA Tournament winner As of March 26, 2017; Rankings from AP poll

The 2016–17 UTEP Miners women's basketball team represented the University of Texas at El Paso during the 2016–17 NCAA Division I women's basketball season. The Lady Miners, led by sixteenth year head coach Keitha Adams, played their home games at Don Haskins Center and were members of Conference USA. They finished the season 8–23, 5–13 for in C-USA play to finish in a tie for eleventh place. They lost in the first round of the C-USA women's tournament to Old Dominion.

== Roster ==
2016–17 UTEP Miners women's basketball team
Players
Coaches

Pos.	#	Name	Height	Year	Previous school	Hometown
G	1	Roeshonda Patterson	5 ft 8 in (1.73 m)	Fr	New Way Christian Academy	Odessa, TX
G	2	Faith Cook	5 ft 3 in (1.6 m)	Fr	Goose Creek Memorial HS	Baytown, TX
G	4	Lulu McKinney	5 ft 7 in (1.7 m)	Jr	A&M Consolidated	Houston, TX
F	5	Zuzanna Puc	6 ft 2 in (1.88 m)	Fr	ZSMS Poznan	Poznań, Poland
F	11	Axelle Bernard	6 ft 2 in (1.88 m)	Jr	Seward County CC	Awans, Belgium
G	12	Sparkle Taylor	5 ft 10 in (1.78 m)	Sr	Northwestern HS	Flint, MI
G/F	14	Najala Howell	5 ft 10 in (1.78 m)	So	DeSoto HS	DeSoto, TX
G	21	Rachel Tapps	5 ft 8 in (1.73 m)	Fr	Cypress Ranch HS	Cypress, TX
F	22	Jessica Barbosa	6 ft 1 in (1.85 m)	RS Fr	Windsor HS	Bissau, Guinea-Bissau
F	23	Jakeira Ford	6 ft 1 in (1.85 m)	Fr	Port Arthur Memorial HS	Port Arthur, TX
G	24	Jenzel Nash	5 ft 7 in (1.7 m)	RS Sr	Worthing HS	Houston, TX
G	32	Chanel Khammarath	5 ft 8 in (1.73 m)	Jr	Coffeyville County CC	Chicago, IL
F	42	Tamara Seda	6 ft 4 in (1.93 m)	Sr	Seward County CC	Maputo, Mozambique
G	44	Katarina Zec	5 ft 10 in (1.78 m)	Fr	Sportska gimnazija	Belgrade, Serbia

Head coach

- Keitha Adams (Southwestern)

Assistant coach(es)

- Ewa Laskowska (Pittsburg State)
- Bill Damuth (UT Tyler)
- Kelli Willingham Bagley (UTEP)

Legend

- (C) Team captain
- (S) Suspended
- (I) Ineligible
- (W) Walk-on
- Injured
- Current redshirt

Roster

== Schedule ==
Date time, TV	Rank^{#}	Opponent^{#}	Result	Record	Site (attendance) city, state
Exhibition
11/04/2016*; 7:05 pm		St. Mary's	W 72–54		Don Haskins Center (432); El Paso, TX
Non-conference regular season
11/11/2016*; 7:05 pm		Northern Arizona	L 51–65	0–1	Don Haskins Center (1,328); El Paso, TX
11/13/2016*; 2:00 pm		Texas Southern	L 68–89	0–2	Don Haskins Center (1,289); El Paso, TX
11/17/2016*; 7:05 pm		Western New Mexico	W 93–46	1–2	Don Haskins Center (1,401); El Paso, TX
11/24/2016*; 1:15 pm		vs. LSU; Paradise Jam tournament Island Division	L 45–78	1–3	Sports and Fitness Center (276); Saint Thomas, USVI
11/25/2016*; 1:15 pm		vs. NC State; Paradise Jam Tournament Island Division	L 55–71	1–4	Sports and Fitness Center (132); Saint Thomas, USVI
11/26/2016*; 1:15 pm		vs. Kansas State; Paradise Jam Tournament Island Division	L 40–61	1–5	Sports and Fitness Center; Saint Thomas, USVI
11/30/2016*; 7:05 pm		Houston Baptist	W 78–45	2–5	Don Haskins Center (1,304); El Paso, TX
12/11/2016*; 2:00 pm		at New Mexico	L 66–79	2–6	The Pit (4,596); Albuquerque, NM
12/15/2016*; 7:05 pm		New Mexico State; Battle of I-10	L 59–67	2–7	Don Haskins Center (1,472); El Paso, TX
12/19/2016*; 4:00 pm		vs. Pittsburgh; Patrick Harrington Tournament	L 46–71	2–8	The Arena at NWFSC; Niceville, FL
12/20/2016*; 6:00 pm		vs. Alabama; Patrick Harrington Tournament	L 60–78	2–9	The Arena at NWFSC; Niceville, FL
12/28/2016*; 1:05 pm		Cal State Bakersfield	W 74–61	3–9	Don Haskins Center (1,234); El Paso, TX
Conference USA regular season
01/01/2017; 2:00 pm		UTSA	L 81–83 ^{OT}	3–10 (0–1)	Don Haskins Center (1,316); El Paso, TX
01/05/2017; 7:05 pm		Louisiana Tech	W 69–62	4–10 (1–1)	Don Haskins Center (1,617); El Paso, TX
01/07/2017; 2:00 pm		Southern Miss	L 68–79	4–11 (1–2)	Don Haskins Center (1,717); El Paso, TX
01/12/2017; 5:00 pm		at FIU	L 87–88 ^{3OT}	4–12 (1–3)	FIU Arena (395); Miami, FL
01/14/2017; 3:00 pm		at Florida Atlantic	W 51–50	5–12 (2–3)	FAU Arena (425); Boca Raton, FL
01/21/2017; 1:00 pm		at UTSA	L 76–97	5–13 (2–4)	Convocation Center (309); San Antonio, TX
01/26/2017; 7:05 pm, beIN		WKU	L 54–71	5–14 (2–5)	Don Haskins Center (2,469); El Paso, TX
01/28/2017; 2:00 pm		Marshall	W 84–74	6–14 (3–5)	Don Haskins Center (1,542); El Paso, TX
02/02/2017; 6:00 pm		at UAB	L 61–74	6–15 (3–6)	Bartow Arena (376); Birmingham, AL
02/04/2017; 6:00 pm, ESPN3		at Middle Tennessee	L 53–76	6–16 (3–7)	Murphy Center (3,411); Murfreesboro, TN
02/09/2017; 5:30 pm		at Louisiana Tech	L 61–69	6–17 (3–8)	Thomas Assembly Center (1,809); Ruston, LA
02/11/2017; 3:00 pm		at Southern Miss	L 48–73	6–18 (3–9)	Reed Green Coliseum (1,364); Hattiesburg, MS
02/16/2017; 7:05 pm, beIN		North Texas	L 69–76	6–19 (3–10)	Don Haskins Center (1,512); El Paso, TX
02/18/2017; 2:00 pm		Rice	L 76–80	6–20 (3–11)	Don Haskins Center (1,422); El Paso, TX
02/23/2017; 7:05 pm		Florida Atlantic	W 69–59	7–20 (4–11)	Don Haskins Center (1,473); El Paso, TX
02/25/2017; 2:00 pm		FIU	W 88–47	8–20 (5–11)	Don Haskins Center (1,532); El Paso, TX
03/02/2017; 5:00 pm, beIN		at Old Dominion	L 68–87	8–21 (5–12)	Ted Constant Convocation Center (1,138); Norfolk, VA
03/04/2017; 5:00 pm, ESPN3		at Charlotte	L 74–84	8–22 (5–13)	Dale F. Halton Arena (1,571); Charlotte, NC
C-USA Women's tournament
03/08/2017; 8:00 pm		vs. Old Dominion; First Round	L 70–80	8–23	Bartow Arena; Birmingham, AL
*Non-conference game. ^{#}Rankings from AP Poll. (#) Tournament seedings in parentheses. All times are in Mountain Time.

== Rankings ==
Regular season polls
Poll	Pre- Season	Week 2	Week 3	Week 4	Week 5	Week 6	Week 7	Week 8	Week 9	Week 10	Week 11	Week 12	Week 13	Week 14	Week 15	Week 16	Week 17	Week 18	Week 19	Final
AP																				N/A
Coaches																				

Legend
	Increase in ranking
	Decrease in ranking
	Not ranked previous week
(RV)	Received Votes

== See also ==
2016–17 UTEP Miners basketball team
