= 2016–17 Western Kentucky Lady Toppers basketball team =

Intercollegiate basketball season

2016–17 Western Kentucky Lady Toppers basketball

C-USA regular season and tournament champions

NCAA Tournament, first round
- Conference: Conference USA
- Record: 27–8 (16–2 C-USA)
- Head coach: Michelle Clark-Heard (4th season)
- Assistant coaches: Greg Collins; Melissa Kolbe; Brittany Parker
- Home arena: E. A. Diddle Arena

2016–17 Conference USA women's basketball standings
	Conf.				Overall
Team	W		L	PCT	W		L	PCT
WKU †	16	–	2	.889	27	–	8	.771
Middle Tennessee	15	–	3	.833	23	–	11	.676
Southern Miss	13	–	5	.722	23	–	11	.676
Charlotte	12	–	6	.667	21	–	10	.677
Louisiana Tech	12	–	6	.667	18	–	14	.563
Old Dominion	11	–	7	.611	17	–	14	.548
UTSA	10	–	8	.556	14	–	17	.452
Rice	8	–	10	.444	22	–	13	.629
UAB	8	–	10	.444	15	–	15	.500
North Texas	8	–	10	.444	12	–	19	.387
Marshall	5	–	13	.278	13	–	17	.433
UTEP	5	–	13	.278	8	–	23	.258
FIU	3	–	15	.167	5	–	24	.172
Florida Atlantic	0	–	18	.000	4	–	25	.138
† 2017 C-USA Tournament winner As of March 26, 2017; Rankings from AP poll

The 2016–17 WKU Lady Toppers basketball team represented Western Kentucky University during the 2016–17 NCAA Division I women's basketball season. The Lady Toppers, led by fourth year head coach Michelle Clark-Heard, played their home games at E. A. Diddle Arena and were third year members of Conference USA. They finished the season 27–8, 16–2 in C-USA play to win the Conference USA regular season and also won the Conference USA Tournament. They received an automatic bid to the NCAA women's basketball tournament, where they were defeated by Ohio State in the first round.

== Roster ==
2016–17 WKU Lady Toppers women's basketball team
Players
Coaches

Pos.	#	Name	Height	Year	Previous school	Hometown
G	1	Naomi Mayes	5 ft 6 in (1.68 m)	RS So	Joliet JC	Crest Hill, IL
G	3	Sidnee Bopp	5 ft 6 in (1.68 m)	So	Marmaduke HS	Marmaduke, AR
F	4	Dee Givens	6 ft 1 in (1.85 m)	So	Lafayette HS	Lexington, KY
G	5	Micah Jones	5 ft 8 in (1.73 m)	RS Sr	Green County HS	Greensburg, KY
F	10	Tashia Brown	6 ft 1 in (1.85 m)	Jr	Lowndes HS	Lake Park, GA
G	12	Kendall Noble	5 ft 11 in (1.8 m)	RS Sr	Perry County Central HS	Hazard, KY
G	13	Malaka Frank	5 ft 10 in (1.78 m)	Fr	Franklin County HS	Frankfort, KY
G	15	Whitney Creech	5 ft 8 in (1.73 m)	Fr	Jenkins HS	Jenkins, KY
G	20	Ima Akpan	5 ft 10 in (1.78 m)	RS Sr	Hamilton Christian Academy; Kilgore College	Calabar, Nigeria
G	21	Sarah Price	6 ft 2 in (1.88 m)	Fr	Bath County HS	Owingsville, KY
F	23	Ivy Brown	6 ft 1 in (1.85 m)	So	LaRue County HS	Hodgenville. KY
G	24	Jaycee Coe	5 ft 11 in (1.8 m)	RS So	Jackson County HS; Kentucky	Gainesboro, TN
F	25	Kyvin Goodin-Rogers	6 ft 1 in (1.85 m)	RS Jr	Marion County; Kentucky	Lebanon, KY
G/F	32	Kayla Smith	5 ft 11 in (1.8 m)	So	Fayette County HS	Fayetteville, GA
C		Raneem Elgedawy	6 ft 4 in (1.93 m)	Fr	None	Alexandria, Egypt

Head coach

- Michelle Clark-Heard (Western Kentucky)

Assistant coach(es)

- Greg Collins (Louisville)
- Melissa Kolbe (Wittenberg)
- Brittany Parker (Fayetteville State)

Legend

- (C) Team captain
- (S) Suspended
- (I) Ineligible
- (W) Walk-on
- Injured
- Current redshirt

Roster

== Schedule ==
Date time, TV	Rank^{#}	Opponent^{#}	Result	Record	Site (attendance) city, state
Exhibition
11/03/2016*; 7:00 pm		Young Harris	W 98–51		E. A. Diddle Arena (811); Bowling Green, KY
Non-conference regular season
11/11/2016*; 7:00 pm		Alabama A&M	W 96–32	1–0	E. A. Diddle Arena (1,138); Bowling Green, KY
11/16/2016*; 5:30 pm, FCS/WKYU		Texas–Arlington	L 68–71	1–1	E. A. Diddle Arena (1,712); Bowling Green, KY
11/19/2016*; 2:00 pm, FCS/WKYU		No. 23 Indiana	W 85–74	2–1	E. A. Diddle Arena (1,832); Bowling Green, KY
11/25/2016*; 12:30 pm		vs. No. 18 DePaul; Gulf Coast Showcase quarterfinals	L 69–77	2–2	Germain Arena; Estero, FL
11/26/2016*; 10:00 am		vs. Kent State; Gulf Coast Showcase consolation 2nd round	W 79–73 ^{OT}	3–2	Germain Arena; Estero, FL
11/27/2016*; 12:30 pm		vs. George Washington; Gulf Coast Showcase 5th place game	L 49–68	3–3	Germain Arena; Estero, FL
11/30/2016*; 4:30 pm, FCS/WKYU		at Eastern Kentucky	W 90–63	4–3	McBrayer Arena; Richmond, KY
12/03/2016*; 12:30 pm		at Austin Peay	W 85–65	5–3	Dunn Center (1,165); Clarksville, TN
12/11/2016*; 1:00 pm, ACCN Extra		at No. 8 Louisville	L 61–68	5–4	KFC Yum! Center (9,168); Louisville, KY
12/15/2016*; 7:00 pm		Lipscomb	W 87–35	6–4	E. A. Diddle Arena (1,120); Bowling Green, KY
12/18/2016*; 2:00 pm		College of Charleston	W 89–76	7–4	E. A. Diddle Arena (1,051); Bowling Green, KY
12/21/2016*; 5:30 pm, FCS/WKYU		Ball State	W 68–61	8–4	E. A. Diddle Arena (1,759); Bowling Green, KY
Conference USA regular season
12/30/2016; 7:00 pm		Florida Atlantic	W 76–55	9–4 (1–0)	E. A. Diddle Arena (1,324); Bowling Green, KY
01/01/2017; 2:00 pm		FIU	W 90–38	10–4 (2–0)	E. A. Diddle Arena (1,033); Bowling Green, KY
01/05/2017; 10:30 am		at Charlotte	L 85–89 ^{OT}	10–5 (2–1)	Dale F. Halton Arena (4,518); Charlotte, NC
01/07/2017; 3:00 pm, ESPN3		at Old Dominion	W 67–62	11–5 (3–1)	Ted Constant Convocation Center (1,290); Norfolk, VA
01/12/2017; 11:00 am		UAB	W 60–48	12–5 (4–1)	E. A. Diddle Arena (4,215); Bowling Green, KY
01/15/2017; 2:00 pm, FCS/WKYU		Middle Tennessee	W 66–51	13–5 (5–1)	E. A. Diddle Arena (2,064); Bowling Green, KY
01/21/2017; 2:00 pm		Marshall	W 73–57	14–5 (6–1)	E. A. Diddle Arena (1,756); Bowling Green, KY
01/26/2017; 8:05 pm, beIN		at UTEP	W 71–54	15–5 (7–1)	Don Haskins Center (2,469); El Paso, TX
01/28/2017; 2:00 pm		at UTSA	L 77–80	15–6 (7–2)	Convocation Center (359); San Antonio, TX
02/02/2017; 7:00 pm		Louisiana Tech	W 67–58	16–6 (8–2)	E. A. Diddle Arena (1,127); Bowling Green, KY
02/04/2017; 7:00 pm		Southern Miss	W 79–53	17–6 (9–2)	E. A. Diddle Arena (1,668); Bowling Green, KY
02/11/2017; 12:00 pm		at Marshall	W 78–64	18–6 (10–2)	Cam Henderson Center (717); Huntington, WV
02/16/2017; 6:30 pm, beIN		at Middle Tennessee	W 82–75	19–6 (11–2)	Murphy Center (4,027); Murfreesboro, TN
02/18/2017; 2:00 pm		at UAB	W 62–52	20–6 (12–2)	Bartow Arena (399); Birmingham, AL
02/23/2017; 7:00 pm		Charlotte	W 75–74	21–6 (13–2)	E. A. Diddle Arena (1,344); Bowling Green, KY
02/25/2017; 2:00 pm		Old Dominion	W 79–73	22–6 (14–2)	E. A. Diddle Arena (2,217); Bowling Green, KY
03/02/2017; 7:00 pm, ESPN3		at North Texas	W 75–55	23–6 (15–2)	The Super Pit (1,037); Denton, TX
03/04/2017; 2:00 pm		at Rice	W 80–75	24–6 (16–2)	Tudor Fieldhouse (829); Houston, TX
Conference USA Women's Tournament
03/09/2017; 1:30 pm		vs. North Texas; Quarterfinals	W 78–51	25–6	Bartow Arena; Birmingham, AL
03/10/2017; 4:30 pm, ASN		vs. Louisiana Tech; Semifinals	W 77–53	26–6	Legacy Arena; Birmingham, AL
03/11/2017; 4:30 pm, CBSSN		vs. Southern Miss; Championship	W 67–56	27–6	Legacy Arena; Birmingham, AL
NCAA Women's Tournament
03/17/2017*; 4:30 pm, ESPN2	(12 L)	vs. (5 L) No. 11 Ohio State; First Round	L 63–70	27–7	Memorial Coliseum (3,557); Lexington, KY
*Non-conference game. ^{#}Rankings from AP Poll. (#) Tournament seedings in parentheses. L=Lexington Region. All times are in Central Time.

== Rankings ==
Regular season polls
Poll	Pre- Season	Week 2	Week 3	Week 4	Week 5	Week 6	Week 7	Week 8	Week 9	Week 10	Week 11	Week 12	Week 13	Week 14	Week 15	Week 16	Week 17	Week 18	Week 19	Final
AP	NR	NR	RV	NR	NR	NR	NR	NR	NR	NR	NR	NR	NR	NR	NR	NR	NR	RV	RV	N/A
Coaches	RV	RV	RV	NR	NR	NR	NR	NR	NR	NR	NR	NR	NR	NR	NR	NR	NR	NR	NR	

Legend
	Increase in ranking
	Decrease in ranking
	Not ranked previous week
(RV)	Received Votes

== See also ==
2016–17 WKU Hilltoppers basketball team
