= 2016–17 Southern Miss Lady Eagles basketball team =

Intercollegiate basketball season

2016–17 Southern Miss Lady Eagles basketball

Lady Eagle Thanksgiving Classic Champions

WNIT, First Round
- Conference: Conference USA
- Record: 23–11 (13–5 C-USA)
- Head coach: Joye Lee-McNelis (13th season)
- Assistant coaches: Kiley Hill; Pauline Love; Lauren Pittman
- Home arena: Reed Green Coliseum

2016–17 Conference USA women's basketball standings
	Conf.				Overall
Team	W		L	PCT	W		L	PCT
WKU †	16	–	2	.889	27	–	8	.771
Middle Tennessee	15	–	3	.833	23	–	11	.676
Southern Miss	13	–	5	.722	23	–	11	.676
Charlotte	12	–	6	.667	21	–	10	.677
Louisiana Tech	12	–	6	.667	18	–	14	.563
Old Dominion	11	–	7	.611	17	–	14	.548
UTSA	10	–	8	.556	14	–	17	.452
Rice	8	–	10	.444	22	–	13	.629
UAB	8	–	10	.444	15	–	15	.500
North Texas	8	–	10	.444	12	–	19	.387
Marshall	5	–	13	.278	13	–	17	.433
UTEP	5	–	13	.278	8	–	23	.258
FIU	3	–	15	.167	5	–	24	.172
Florida Atlantic	0	–	18	.000	4	–	25	.138
† 2017 C-USA Tournament winner As of March 26, 2017; Rankings from AP poll

The 2016–17 Southern Miss Lady Eagles basketball team represented the University of Southern Mississippi during the 2016–17 NCAA Division I women's basketball season. The Lady Eagles, led by thirteenth year head coach Joye Lee-McNelis, play their home games at Reed Green Coliseum and are members of Conference USA.

== Roster ==
2016–17 Southern Miss Golden Eagles women's basketball team
Players
Coaches

Pos.	#	Name	Height	Year	Previous school	Hometown
G	1	Tajanay Veiga	5 ft 6 in (1.68 m)	Sr	Midland College	Boston, MA
F	2	Lashyra Cotton	5 ft 11 in (1.8 m)	Sr	East Side HS	Cleveland, MS
G	3	Keri Jewett-Giles	5 ft 6 in (1.68 m)	So	Dunbar HS	Fort Myers, FL
G	5	Shonte Hailes	5 ft 6 in (1.68 m)	Fr	Quitman HS	Quitman, MS
G	12	Brittanny Dinkins	5 ft 7 in (1.7 m)	Sr	Norland HS	Miami, FL
G	14	Katie Dozier	5 ft 6 in (1.68 m)	Jr	Walton HS	Marietta, GA
C	15	Amber Landing (redshirt)	6 ft 4 in (1.93 m)	So	Little Rock	Sharon, MS
G	20	Molly Brown	5 ft 9 in (1.75 m)	Jr	South Georgia Tech	Douglasville, GA
G/F	21	Jayla King	5 ft 9 in (1.75 m)	RS Jr	South Florida	Pensacola, FL
G	22	Megan Brown	5 ft 10 in (1.78 m)	Jr	Salmen HS	Slidell, LA
G	24	Brittny Norris	5 ft 9 in (1.75 m)	Sr	Tyler JC	Dallas, TX
F	34	Respect Leaphart	6 ft 0 in (1.83 m)	Fr	Dunbar HS	Fort Myers, FL
F	44	Shayla Wilson	6 ft 1 in (1.85 m)	Sr	St. Petersburg College	Tampa, FL

Head coach

- Joye Lee-McNelis (Southern Miss)

Assistant coach(es)

- Kiley Hill (Arkansas Tech)
- Pauline Love (Southern Miss)
- Lauren Pittman (Southern Miss)

Legend

- (C) Team captain
- (S) Suspended
- (I) Ineligible
- (W) Walk-on
- Injured
- Current redshirt

Roster

== Schedule ==
Date time, TV	Rank^{#}	Opponent^{#}	Result	Record	Site (attendance) city, state
Exhibition
11/08/2016*; 6:00 pm		Mississippi College	W 91–73		Reed Green Coliseum; Hattiesburg, MS
Non-conference regular season
11/13/2016*; 2:00 pm		New Orleans	W 78–53	1–0	Reed Green Coliseum (1,271); Hattiesburg, MS
11/14/2015*; 11:00 am		William Carey	W 92–39	2–0	Reed Green Coliseum (2,595); Hattiesburg, MS
11/17/2016*; 6:00 pm		Alabama State	W 70–43	3–0	Reed Green Coliseum (1,337); Hattiesburg, MS
11/20/2016*; 2:00 pm		at Tulane	L 67–86	3–1	Devlin Fieldhouse (812); New Orleans, LA
11/25/2016*; 10:00 am		Alcorn State; Lady Eagle Thanksgiving Classic semifinals	W 99–56	4–1	Reed Green Coliseum (1,190); Hattiesburg, MS
11/26/2016*; 4:00 pm		Louisiana–Lafayette; Lady Eagle Thanksgiving Classic championship	W 71–49	5–1	Reed Green Coliseum (1,169); Hattiesburg, MS
12/01/2016*; 4:00 pm		Mississippi Valley State	W 83–55	6–1	Reed Green Coliseum (1,253); Hattiesburg, MS
12/04/2016*; 2:05 pm		at South Alabama	W 57–48	7–1	Mitchell Center (491); Mobile, AL
12/10/2016*; 4:00 pm		No. 5 Mississippi State	L 50–72	7–2	Reed Green Coliseum (2,890); Hattiesburg, MS
12/19/2016*; 6:30 pm		vs. California; Puerto Rico Classic	L 51–71	7–3	South Point Arena; Enterprise, NV
12/20/2016*; 12:00 pm		vs. Xavier; Puerto Rico Classic	W 73–59	8–3	South Point Arena (83); Enterprise, NV
12/21/2016*; 10:00 am		vs. Northern Kentucky; Puerto Rico Classic	L 53–58	8–4	South Point Arena (102); Enterprise, NV
Conference USA regular season
12/29/2016; 6:30 pm		at Louisiana Tech	L 61–72	8–5 (0–1)	Thomas Assembly Center (1,530); Ruston, LA
01/05/2017; 7:00 pm		at UTSA	W 69–68	9–5 (1–1)	Convocation Center (203); San Antonio, TX
01/07/2017; 3:00 pm		at UTEP	W 79–68	10–5 (2–1)	Don Haskins Center (1,717); El Paso, TX
01/12/2017; 6:00 pm		Old Dominion	W 84–69	11–5 (3–1)	Reed Green Coliseum (13); Hattiesburg, MS
01/14/2017; 4:00 pm		Charlotte	L 61–78	11–6 (3–2)	Reed Green Coliseum (1,540); Hattiesburg, MS
01/19/2017; 7:00 pm, beIN		at North Texas	L 62–75	11–7 (3–3)	The Super Pit (826); Denton, TX
01/21/2017; 2:00 pm		at Rice	L 68–76	11–8 (3–4)	Tudor Fieldhouse (609); Houston, TX
01/26/2017; 6:00 pm		Middle Tennessee	W 81–61	12–8 (4–4)	Reed Green Coliseum (1,333); Hattiesburg, MS
01/28/2017; 4:00 pm		UAB	W 64–59	13–8 (5–4)	Reed Green Coliseum (1,560); Hattiesburg, MS
02/02/2017; 6:00 pm		at Marshall	W 82–78	14–8 (6–4)	Cam Henderson Center (613); Huntington, WV
02/04/2017; 2:05 pm		at WKU	L 53–79	14–9 (6–5)	E. A. Diddle Arena (1,668); Bowling Green, KY
02/09/2017; 6:00 pm		UTSA	W 74–71	15–9 (7–5)	Reed Green Coliseum (1,360); Hattiesburg, MS
02/11/2017; 4:00 pm		UTEP	W 73–48	16–9 (8–5)	Reed Green Coliseum (1,364); Hattiesburg, MS
02/16/2017; 6:00 pm		at FIU	W 75–37	17–9 (9–5)	FIU Arena (382); Miami, FL
02/18/2017; 4:00 pm		at Florida Atlantic	W 82–67	18–9 (10–5)	FAU Arena (638); Boca Raton, FL
02/23/2017; 6:00 pm		Rice	W 79–60	19–9 (11–5)	Reed Green Coliseum (1,237); Hattiesburg, MS
02/25/2017; 4:00 pm		North Texas	W 70–48	20–9 (12–5)	Reed Green Coliseum (1,428); Hattiesburg, MS
03/03/2017; 6:00 pm		Louisiana Tech	W 72–63	21–9 (13–5)	Reed Green Coliseum (1,581); Hattiesburg, MS
Conference USA Women's Tournament
03/09/2017; 9:00 pm		vs. Old Dominion; Quarterfinals	W 80–74	22–9	Bartow Arena; Birmingham, AL
03/10/2017; 7:00 pm, ASN		vs. Middle Tennessee; Semifinals	W 59–54	23–9	Legacy Arena; Birmingham, AL
03/11/2017; 4:30 pm, CBSSN		vs. WKU; Championship Game	L 56–67	23–10	Legacy Arena; Birmingham, AL
Women's National Invitation Tournament
03/15/2017*; 6:00 pm		Little Rock; First Round	L 62–72	23–11	Reed Green Coliseum (987); Hattiesburg, MS
*Non-conference game. ^{#}Rankings from AP Poll. (#) Tournament seedings in parentheses. All times are in Central Time.

== See also ==
2016–17 Southern Miss Golden Eagles basketball team
