= 2016–17 Louisiana Tech Lady Techsters basketball team =

Intercollegiate basketball season

2016–17 Louisiana Tech Lady Techsters basketball

WNIT, First Round
- Conference: Conference USA
- Record: 18–14 (12–6 C-USA)
- Head coach: Brooke Stoehr & Scott Stoehr (1st season)
- Assistant coaches: Lindsey Hicks; Alaura Sharp
- Home arena: Thomas Assembly Center

2016–17 Conference USA women's basketball standings
	Conf.				Overall
Team	W		L	PCT	W		L	PCT
WKU †	16	–	2	.889	27	–	8	.771
Middle Tennessee	15	–	3	.833	23	–	11	.676
Southern Miss	13	–	5	.722	23	–	11	.676
Charlotte	12	–	6	.667	21	–	10	.677
Louisiana Tech	12	–	6	.667	18	–	14	.563
Old Dominion	11	–	7	.611	17	–	14	.548
UTSA	10	–	8	.556	14	–	17	.452
Rice	8	–	10	.444	22	–	13	.629
UAB	8	–	10	.444	15	–	15	.500
North Texas	8	–	10	.444	12	–	19	.387
Marshall	5	–	13	.278	13	–	17	.433
UTEP	5	–	13	.278	8	–	23	.258
FIU	3	–	15	.167	5	–	24	.172
Florida Atlantic	0	–	18	.000	4	–	25	.138
† 2017 C-USA Tournament winner As of March 26, 2017; Rankings from AP poll

The 2016–17 Louisiana Tech Lady Techsters basketball team represented the Louisiana Tech University during the 2016–17 NCAA Division I women's basketball season. The Lady Techsters, led by first year co-head coaches Brooke Stoehr and Scott Stoehr, played their home games at Thomas Assembly Center and were members of Conference USA. They finished the season 18–14, 12–6 in C-USA play to finish in a tie for fourth place. They advanced to the semifinals of the C-USA women's tournament where they lost to WKU. They were invited to the Women's National Invitation Tournament where they lost to Southern Methodist University in the first round.

== Roster ==
2016–17 Louisiana Tech Lady Techsters women's basketball team
Players
Coaches

Pos.	#	Name	Height	Year	Previous school	Hometown
F	1	Dawn Gipson	6 ft 1 in (1.85 m)	So	Ribault HS	Jacksonville, FL
G	2	Rochelle Vasquez	5 ft 10 in (1.78 m)	Sr	Gulf Coast State College	Dallas, TX
G	3	Kierra Lang	5 ft 9 in (1.75 m)	Fr	Springdale HS	Springdale, AR
G	4	Kierra Anthony	5 ft 6 in (1.68 m)	So	New Iberia HS	New Iberia, LA
G	10	Maren Kreid	5 ft 7 in (1.7 m)	RS So	Brentwood Academy	Franklin, TN
G	12	Daria McCutcheon	5 ft 8 in (1.73 m)	Fr	Plano East HS	Plano, TX
G	14	Anna McLeod	6 ft 0 in (1.83 m)	RS Fr	Homeschooled	Houston, TX
G	22	Jasmine LeBlanc	5 ft 10 in (1.78 m)	So	Breaux Bridge HS	Breaux Bridge, LA
F	23	Reauna Cleaver	6 ft 2 in (1.88 m)	So	Elizabethtown HS	Elizabethtown, KY
G	24	Ashley Reid	5 ft 6 in (1.68 m)	Fr	S.H. Rider HS	Wichita Falls, TX
G	25	Nikki McDonald (I) (redshirt)	6 ft 0 in (1.83 m)	Fr	Elon	Atlanta, GA
G	30	Ashley Santos	5 ft 11 in (1.8 m)	RS Sr	Marquette	Geneva, IL
F	32	Kevione Moten	6 ft 4 in (1.93 m)	Sr	Ouachita HS	Monroe, LA
F	34	Alexus Malone (I) (redshirt)	6 ft 0 in (1.83 m)	RS Jr	Buffalo	Oxford, MS

Head coach

- Brooke Stoehr (Louisiana Tech)
- Scott Stoehr (Little Rock)

Assistant coach(es)

- Lindsey Hicks (Purdue)
- Alaura Sharp (Southwest Minnesota State)

Legend

- (C) Team captain
- (S) Suspended
- (I) Ineligible
- (W) Walk-on
- Injured
- Current redshirt

Roster

== Schedule ==
Date time, TV	Rank^{#}	Opponent^{#}	Result	Record	Site (attendance) city, state
Non-conference regular season
11/11/2016*; 6:30 pm		LSU	L 73–77	0–1	Thomas Assembly Center (4,111); Ruston, LA
11/19/2016*; 7:00 pm		Grambling State	W 69–55	1–1	Thomas Assembly Center (2,019); Ruston, LA
11/22/2016*; 4:00 pm		at Clemson	L 67–78 ^{OT}	1–2	Littlejohn Coliseum (254); Clemson, SC
11/26/2016*; 1:00 pm		LSU–Alexandria	W 103–63	2–2	Thomas Assembly Center (1,523); Ruston, LA
11/29/2016*; 6:00 pm		at Louisiana–Monroe	W 73–53	3–2	Fant–Ewing Coliseum (503); Ruston, LA
12/04/2016*; 2:00 pm		at McNeese State	W 66–56	4–2	Burton Coliseum (404); Lake Charles, LA
12/07/2016*; 11:15 am		Stephen F. Austin	L 58–60	4–3	Thomas Assembly Center (2,486); Ruston, LA
12/10/2016*; 1:00 pm		Nicholls State	W 68–52	5–3	Thomas Assembly Center (1,510); Ruston, LA
12/14/2016*; 6:30 pm		Auburn	L 66–76	5–4	Thomas Assembly Center (1,526); Ruston, LA
12/19/2016*; 7:00 pm		at Memphis	L 54–56	5–5	Elma Roane Fieldhouse (542); Memphis, TN
12/22/2016*; 7:00 pm		at Louisiana–Lafayette	L 72–80	5–6	Cajundome (774); Lafayette, LA
Conference USA regular season
12/30/2016; 6:30 pm		Southern Miss	W 72–61	6–6 (1–0)	Thomas Assembly Center (1,530); Ruston, LA
01/05/2017; 8:05 pm		at UTEP	L 62–69	6–7 (1–1)	Don Haskins Center (1,617); El Paso, TX
01/07/2017; 2:00 pm		at UTSA	L 61–63	6–8 (1–2)	Convocation Center (252); San Antonio, TX
01/12/2017; 6:30 pm		Charlotte	W 80–54	7–8 (2–2)	Thomas Assembly Center (1,612); Ruston, LA
01/14/2017; 1:00 pm		Old Dominion	L 6469	7–9 (2–3)	Thomas Assembly Center (1,530); Ruston, LA
01/19/2017; 7:00 pm		at Rice	W 70–67 ^{OT}	8–9 (3–3)	Tudor Fieldhouse (464); Houston, TX
01/21/2017; 3:00 pm, ESPN3		at North Texas	W 72–65	9–9 (4–3)	The Super Pit (1,098); Denton, TX
01/26/2017; 6:30 pm		UAB	W 64–63	10–9 (5–3)	Thomas Assembly Center (1,526); Ruston, LA
01/28/2017; 1:00 pm		Middle Tennessee	L 65–79	10–10 (5–4)	Thomas Assembly Center (1,528); Ruston, LA
02/02/2017; 7:00 pm		at WKU	L 58–67	10–11 (5–5)	E. A. Diddle Arena (1,127); Bowling Green, KY
02/04/2017; 12:00 pm		at Marshall	W 72–64	11–11 (6–5)	Cam Henderson Center (1,072); Huntington, WV
02/09/2017; 6:30 pm		UTEP	W 69–61	12–11 (7–5)	Thomas Assembly Center (1,809); Ruston, LA
02/11/2017; 1:00 pm		UTSA	W 77–71	13–11 (8–5)	Thomas Assembly Center (1,934); Ruston, LA
02/16/2017; 6:00 pm		at Florida Atlantic	W 76–52	14–11 (9–5)	FAU Arena (489); Boca Raton, FL
02/18/2017; 1:00 pm		at FIU	W 76–63	15–11 (10–5)	FIU Arena (328); Miami, FL
02/23/2017; 6:30 pm		North Texas	W 65–49	16–11 (11–5)	Thomas Assembly Center (1,648); Ruston, LA
02/25/2017; 7:00 pm		Rice	W 62–51	17–11 (12–5)	Thomas Assembly Center (2,025); Ruston, LA
03/03/2017; 6:00 pm		at Southern Miss	L 63–72	17–12 (12–6)	Reed Green Coliseum (1,581); Hattiesburg, MS
Conference USA Women's Tournament
03/09/2017; 3:00 pm	(4)	vs. (5) Charlotte; Quarterfinals	W 66–55	18–12	Bartow Arena (686); Birmingham, AL
03/09/2017; 3:00 pm, ASN	(4)	vs. (1) Western Kentucky; Semifinals	L 59–77	18–13	Legacy Arena; Birmingham, AL
Women's National Invitation Tournament
03/17/2017*; 7:00 pm		at SMU; First Round	L 70–75 ^{OT}	18–14	Moody Coliseum (847); Dallas, TX
*Non-conference game. ^{#}Rankings from AP Poll. (#) Tournament seedings in parentheses. All times are in Central Time.

== See also ==
2016–17 Louisiana Tech Bulldogs basketball team
