= 2016–17 North Texas Mean Green women's basketball team =

Intercollegiate basketball season

2016–17 North Texas Mean Green women's basketball
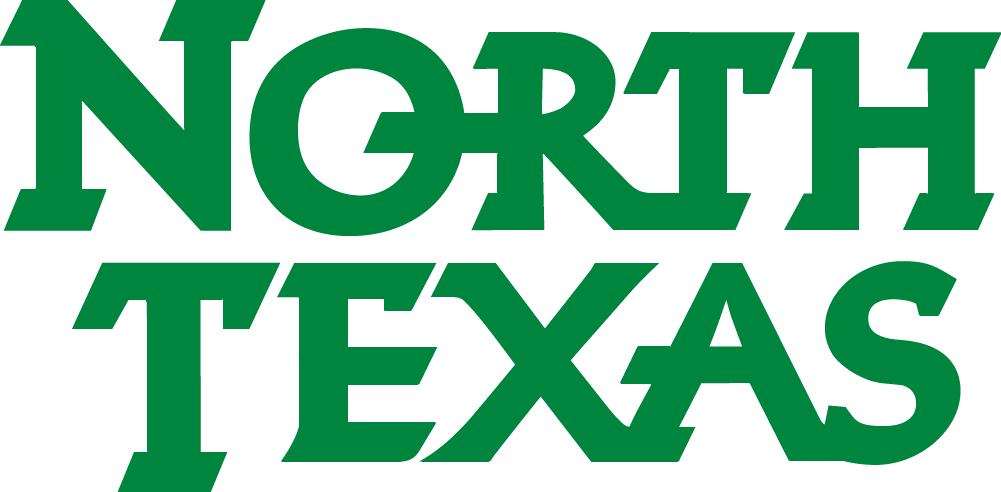
- Conference: Conference USA
- Record: 12–19 (8–10 C-USA)
- Head coach: Jalie Mitchell (2nd season)
- Assistant coaches: Bobby Brasel; Aisha Stewart; Kasondra Foreman
- Home arena: The Super Pit

2016–17 Conference USA women's basketball standings
	Conf.				Overall
Team	W		L	PCT	W		L	PCT
WKU †	16	–	2	.889	27	–	8	.771
Middle Tennessee	15	–	3	.833	23	–	11	.676
Southern Miss	13	–	5	.722	23	–	11	.676
Charlotte	12	–	6	.667	21	–	10	.677
Louisiana Tech	12	–	6	.667	18	–	14	.563
Old Dominion	11	–	7	.611	17	–	14	.548
UTSA	10	–	8	.556	14	–	17	.452
Rice	8	–	10	.444	22	–	13	.629
UAB	8	–	10	.444	15	–	15	.500
North Texas	8	–	10	.444	12	–	19	.387
Marshall	5	–	13	.278	13	–	17	.433
UTEP	5	–	13	.278	8	–	23	.258
FIU	3	–	15	.167	5	–	24	.172
Florida Atlantic	0	–	18	.000	4	–	25	.138
† 2017 C-USA Tournament winner As of March 26, 2017; Rankings from AP poll

The 2016–17 North Texas Mean Green women's basketball team represented the University of North Texas during the 2016–17 NCAA Division I women's basketball season. The Mean Green, led by second-year head coach Jalie Mitchell, played their home games UNT Coliseum, also known as The Super Pit, and were fourth-year members of Conference USA (C-USA). They finished the season 12–19, 8–10 in C-USA play, to finish in a three-way tie for eighth place. They advanced to the quarterfinals of the C-USA women's tournament, where they lost to WKU.

== Roster ==
2016–17 North Texas Mean Green women's basketball team
Players
Coaches

Pos.	#	Name	Height	Year	Previous school	Hometown
G	1	Tyara Warren	5 ft 9 in (1.75 m)	RS So	Plano West; West Virginia	Plano, TX
G	2	Grance Goodhart (I) (redshirt)	5 ft 9 in (1.75 m)	So	Sunnyvale; Loyola Chicago	Sunnyvale, TX
G	3	Kelsey Criner	5 ft 7 in (1.7 m)	Sr	Lincoln HS; New Mexico JC	Dallas, TX
G	10	Adrianna Henderson	5 ft 8 in (1.73 m)	Fr	Topeka HS	Topeka, KS
F	11	Justis Szcezepanski (I) (redshirt)	6 ft 3 in (1.91 m)	So	IMG Academy; Baylor	Portland, OR
F	12	Jada Poland	5 ft 11 in (1.8 m)	Fr	Fort Zumwalt HS	St. Louis, MO
G	13	Orianna Shillow	5 ft 8 in (1.73 m)	So	Stony Point HS	Round Rock, TX
G	14	Candice Adams	5 ft 8 in (1.73 m)	Sr	Atascocita HS	Cedar Hill, TX
C	15	Hannah Hopkins	5 ft 3 in (1.6 m)	Fr	Kingwood HS	Humble, TX
G	20	Terra Ellison	5 ft 11 in (1.8 m)	Sr	The Colony HS	The Colony, TX
G	22	Stabresa McDaniel	5 ft 10 in (1.78 m)	RS Jr	Skyline HS; Minnesota	Dallas, TX
G	23	Terriell Bradley	5 ft 10 in (1.78 m)	RS So	Mansfield HS; Kansas	Arlington, TX
C	30	Tosin Mabodu	6 ft 1 in (1.85 m)	Jr	Homewood-Flossmor HS; Murray State College	Chicago, IL
C	34	Micayla Buckner	6 ft 3 in (1.91 m)	RS So	Naaman Forest HS; Collin College	Garland, TX
F	41	Madison Townley	6 ft 0 in (1.83 m)	Fr	Duncanville HS	Duncanville, TX

Head coach

- Jalie Mitchell (North Texas)

Assistant coach(es)

- Bobby Brasel (UT Permian Basin)
- Aisha Stewart (Catawba)
- Kasondra Foreman (North Texas)

Legend

- (C) Team captain
- (S) Suspended
- (I) Ineligible
- (W) Walk-on
- Injured
- Current redshirt

Roster
Last update: February 13, 2025

== Schedule ==
Date time, TV	Rank^{#}	Opponent^{#}	Result	Record	Site (attendance) city, state
Exhibition
November 6, 2016*; 4:00 p.m.		Texas Woman's	W 59–47		The Super Pit (547); Denton, TX
Non-conference regular season
November 11, 2016*; 6:30 p.m.		at Little Rock; Preseason WNIT first round	L 44–55	0–1	Jack Stephens Center (1,725); Little Rock, AR
November 18, 2016*; 8:00 p.m.		vs. Texas–Rio Grande Valley; Preseason WNIT consolation round	L 69–74	0–2	Moody Coliseum (892); Abilene, TX
November 19, 2016*; 4:00 p.m.		vs. Nebraska–Omaha; Preseason WNIT consolation round	L 57–85	0–3	Moody Coliseum; Abilene, TX
November 22, 2016*; 12:00 p.m.		at Arizona	W 62–58	1–3	McKale Center (8,442); Tucson, AZ
November 26, 2016*; 3:00 p.m.		Iona	W 66–55	2–3	The Super Pit (1,178); Denton, TX
November 30, 2016*; 7:00 p.m.		at SMU	L 51–65	2–4	Moody Coliseum (833); Dallas, TX
December 3, 2016*; 2:00 p.m.		at Tulsa	L 58–63	2–5	Reynolds Center (211); Tulsa, OK
December 6, 2016*; 11:30 a.m.		Indiana	L 64–94	2–6	The Super Pit (2,164); Denton, TX
December 10, 2016*; 3:00 p.m.		Incarnate Word	W 84–61	3–6	The Super Pit (363); Denton, TX
December 17, 2016*; 2:05 p.m., ESPN3		at Missouri State	L 54–63	3–7	JQH Arena (2,176); Springfield, MO
December 22, 2016*; 5:00 p.m.		Texas State	L 58–59	3–8	The Super Pit (725); Denton, TX
Conference USA regular season
December 30, 2016; 7:00 p.m.		Charlotte	L 63–78	3–9 (0–1)	The Super Pit (1,283); Denton, TX
January 1, 2017; 3:00 p.m.		Old Dominion	W 65–55	4–9 (1–1)	The Super Pit (811); Denton, TX
January 5, 2017; 7:00 p.m.		at UAB	W 59–58 ^{OT}	5–9 (2–1)	Bartow Arena (522); Birmingham, AL
January 7, 2017; 6:00 p.m.		at Middle Tennessee	L 52–60	5–10 (2–2)	Murphy Center (3,632); Murfreesboro, TN
January 14, 2017; 3:00 p.m.		Rice	L 49–54	5–11 (2–3)	The Super Pit (1,073); Denton, TX
January 19, 2017; 7:00 p.m.		Southern Miss	W 75–62	6–11 (3–3)	The Super Pit (609); Denton, TX
January 21, 2017; 3:00 p.m., ESPN3		Louisiana Tech	L 65–72	6–12 (3–4)	The Super Pit (1,098); Denton, TX
January 26, 2017; 6:00 p.m.		at Charlotte	L 49–66	6–13 (3–5)	Dale F. Halton Arena (1,163); Charlotte, NC
January 28, 2017; 6:00 p.m.		at Old Dominion	L 47–62	6–14 (3–6)	Ted Constant Convocation Center (1,827); Norfolk, VA
February 4, 2017; 2:00 p.m.		at Rice	W 77–69 ^{OT}	7–14 (4–6)	Tudor Fieldhouse (510); Houston, TX
February 9, 2017; 7:00 p.m.		Florida Atlantic	W 79–57	8–14 (5–6)	The Super Pit (667); Denton, TX
February 11, 2017; 3:00 p.m.		FIU	W 69–49	9–14 (6–6)	The Super Pit (953); Denton, TX
February 16, 2017; 8:05 p.m., beIN		at UTEP	W 76–69	10–14 (7–6)	Don Haskins Center (1,512); El Paso, TX
February 18, 2017; 2:00 p.m.		at UTSA	W 58–55 ^{OT}	11–14 (8–6)	Convocation Center (606); San Antonio, TX
February 23, 2017; 6:30 p.m.		at Louisiana Tech	L 49–65	11–15 (8–7)	Thomas Assembly Center (1,648); Ruston, LA
February 25, 2017; 4:00 p.m.		at Southern Miss	L 48–70	11–16 (8–8)	Reed Green Coliseum (1,428); Hattiesburg, MS
March 2, 2017; 7:00 p.m., ESPN3		WKU	L 55–75	11–17 (8–9)	The Super Pit (1,037); Denton, TX
March 4, 2017; 3:00 p.m.		Marshall	L 57–60	11–18 (8–10)	The Super Pit (976); Denton, TX
Conference USA women's tournament
March 8, 2017; 12:30 p.m.		vs. UAB; First round	W 65–62 ^{2OT}	12–18	Bartow Arena; Birmingham, AL
March 9, 2017; 12:30 p.m.		vs. WKU; Quarterfinals	L 51–78	12–19	Bartow Arena; Birmingham, AL
*Non-conference game. ^{#}Rankings from AP poll. (#) Tournament seedings in parentheses. All times are in Central.

== See also ==
- 2016–17 North Texas Mean Green men's basketball team
