= 2016–17 Rice Owls women's basketball team =

Intercollegiate basketball season

2016–17 Rice Owls women's basketball

Women's Basketball Invitational champions
- Conference: Conference USA
- Record: 22–13 (8–10 C-USA)
- Head coach: Tina Langley (2nd season)
- Assistant coaches: Josh Hutchinson; Angie Nelp; Sydney Colson
- Home arena: Tudor Fieldhouse

2016–17 Conference USA women's basketball standings
	Conf.				Overall
Team	W		L	PCT	W		L	PCT
WKU †	16	–	2	.889	27	–	8	.771
Middle Tennessee	15	–	3	.833	23	–	11	.676
Southern Miss	13	–	5	.722	23	–	11	.676
Charlotte	12	–	6	.667	21	–	10	.677
Louisiana Tech	12	–	6	.667	18	–	14	.563
Old Dominion	11	–	7	.611	17	–	14	.548
UTSA	10	–	8	.556	14	–	17	.452
Rice	8	–	10	.444	22	–	13	.629
UAB	8	–	10	.444	15	–	15	.500
North Texas	8	–	10	.444	12	–	19	.387
Marshall	5	–	13	.278	13	–	17	.433
UTEP	5	–	13	.278	8	–	23	.258
FIU	3	–	15	.167	5	–	24	.172
Florida Atlantic	0	–	18	.000	4	–	25	.138
† 2017 C-USA Tournament winner As of March 26, 2017; Rankings from AP poll

The 2016–17 Rice Owls women's basketball team represented Rice University during the 2016–17 NCAA Division I women's basketball season. The Owls, led by second-year head coach Tina Langley, played their home games at the Tudor Fieldhouse and were members of Conference USA. They finished the season 22–13, 8–10 in C-USA play to finish in a 3 way tie for eighth place. They advanced to the quarterfinals of the C-USA women's tournament, where they lost to Middle Tennessee. They were invited to the WBI, where they defeated Lamar, Texas–Rio Grande Valley, Idaho and UNC Greensboro, to become champions of the Women's Basketball Invitational.

== Roster ==
2016–17 Rice Owls women's basketball team
Players
Coaches

Pos.	#	Name	Height	Year	Previous school	Hometown
G	2	Tayler Bennett	5 ft 7 in (1.7 m)	Fr	St. Anthony HS	Long Beach, CA
G	3	Maya Hawkins	5 ft 6 in (1.68 m)	Sr	Lake Ridge HS	Mansfield, TX
G	5	Lauren Grigsby	5 ft 10 in (1.78 m)	So	Dekaney HS	Spring, TX
G	10	Wendy Knight	5 ft 9 in (1.75 m)	Jr	Reagan HS	San Antonio, TX
F	11	Lexie Ducat	6 ft 1 in (1.85 m)	So	Brock HS	Brock, TX
G	13	Jazz Taylor	5 ft 8 in (1.73 m)	RS Fr	Duncanville HS	Dallas, TX
G	20	Shani Rainey	5 ft 10 in (1.78 m)	Jr	Lovejoy HS	Fairview, TX
G	21	Gabrielle Stanton	5 ft 7 in (1.7 m)	So	Kingwood HS	Kingwood, TX
G/F	22	Nicole Iademarco	6 ft 1 in (1.85 m)	RS So	The Woodlands HS; Arizona State	The Woodlands, TX
G	25	Kendall Ellig	5 ft 7 in (1.7 m)	Fr	Liberty Christian School	Flower Mound, TX
F	33	Jasmine Goodwine	6 ft 1 in (1.85 m)	Sr	Killeen HS	Killeen, TX
C	40	Gabby Ozoude	6 ft 2 in (1.88 m)	Fr	Bellbrook HS	Bellbrook, OH
G/F	44	Adaeze Obinnah	6 ft 1 in (1.85 m)	Sr	Grandview HS	Aurora, CO
G		Erica Ogwumike (I) (redshirt)	5 ft 9 in (1.75 m)	So	Cypress Woods HS; Pepperdine	Cypress, TX
F		Olivia Ogwumike (I) (redshirt)	5 ft 11 in (1.8 m)	Jr	Cypress Woods; Pepperdine	Cypress, TX

Head coach

- Tina Langley (West Alabama)

Assistant coach(es)

- Josh Hutchinson (Messiah)
- Angie Nelp (Colorado State)
- Sydney Colson (Texas A&M)

Legend

- (C) Team captain
- (S) Suspended
- (I) Ineligible
- (W) Walk-on
- Injured
- Current redshirt

Roster

== Rankings ==
Regular season polls
Poll	Pre- season	Week 2	Week 3	Week 4	Week 5	Week 6	Week 7	Week 8	Week 9	Week 10	Week 11	Week 12	Week 13	Week 14	Week 15	Week 16	Week 17	Week 18	Week 19	Final
AP																				
Coaches																				

Legend
	Increase in ranking
	Decrease in ranking
	No change
(RV)	Received votes

== Schedule ==
Date time, TV	Rank^{#}	Opponent^{#}	Result	Record	Site (attendance) city, state
Exhibition
11/04/2016*; 7:00 pm		Concordia	W 101–46		Tudor Fieldhouse; Houston, TX
Non-conference regular season
11/11/2016*; 7:00 pm		Prairie View A&M	W 68–57	1–0	Tudor Fieldhouse (459); Houston, TX
11/16/2016*; 7:00 pm		at LSU	L 55–66	1–1	Maravich Center (1,602); Baton Rouge, LA
11/19/2016*; 2:00 pm		at Houston Baptist	W 79–53	2–1	Sharp Gymnasium (522); Houston, TX
11/22/2016*; 7:00 pm		Grand Canyon	W 64–50	3–1	Tudor Fieldhouse (498); Houston, TX
11/26/2016*; 1:00 pm		at Oklahoma State	L 51–65	3–2	Gallagher-Iba Arena (2,057); Stillwater, OK
11/29/2016*; 7:00 pm		Sam Houston State	W 77–51	4–2	Tudor Fieldhouse (310); Houston, TX
12/03/2016*; 1:00 pm		at Incarnate Word	W 60–43	5–2	McDermott Center (632); San Antonio, TX
12/11/2016*; 2:00 pm		at Texas Southern	W 52–49	6–2	Health and Physical Education Arena (338); Houston, TX
12/15/2016*; 7:00 pm		Texas A&M–Corpus Christi	W 70–36	7–2	Tudor Fieldhouse (370); Houston, TX
12/18/2016*; 2:00 pm		at Louisiana–Monroe	W 93–50	8–2	Fant–Ewing Coliseum (512); Monroe, LA
12/21/2016*; 5:00 pm		Huston–Tillotson	W 96–62	9–2	Tudor Fieldhouse (512); Houston, TX
Conference USA regular season
12/30/2016; 5:00 pm		Old Dominion	L 47–59	9–3 (0–1)	Tudor Fieldhouse (393); Houston, TX
01/01/2017; 1:00 pm		Charlotte	L 51–69	9–4 (0–2)	Tudor Fieldhouse (322); Houston, TX
01/05/2017; 6:00 pm		at Middle Tennessee	L 61–71	9–5 (0–3)	Murphy Center (2,806); Murfreesboro, TN
01/08/2017; 2:00 pm		at UAB; Postponed from 01/07/2017	L 61–62 ^{OT}	9–6 (0–4)	Bartow Arena (284); Birmingham, AL
01/14/2017; 3:00 pm		at North Texas	W 54–49	10–6 (1–4)	The Super Pit (1,073); Denton, TX
01/19/2017; 7:00 pm		Louisiana Tech	L 67–70 ^{OT}	10–7 (1–5)	Tudor Fieldhouse (464); Houston, TX
01/21/2017; 2:00 pm		Southern Miss	W 76–68	11–7 (2–5)	Tudor Fieldhouse (609); Houston, TX
01/26/2017; 6:00 pm		at Old Dominion	L 66–81	11–8 (2–6)	Ted Constant Convocation Center (1,627); Norfolk, VA
01/28/2017; 6:00 pm, ESPN3		at Charlotte	W 55–52	12–8 (3–6)	Dale F. Halton Arena (1,464); Charlotte, NC
02/04/2017; 2:00 pm		North Texas	L 69–77 ^{OT}	12–9 (3–7)	Tudor Fieldhouse (510); Houston, TX
02/09/2017; 7:00 pm		FIU	W 74–55	13–9 (4–7)	Tudor Fieldhouse (312); Houston, TX
02/11/2017; 2:00 pm		Florida Atlantic	W 89–55	14–9 (5–7)	Tudor Fieldhouse (701); Houston, TX
02/16/2017; 7:00 pm		at UTSA	W 66–61	15–9 (6–7)	Convocation Center (386); San Antonio, TX
02/18/2017; 3:00 pm		at UTEP	W 80–76	16–9 (7–7)	Don Haskins Center (1,422); El Paso, TX
02/23/2017; 6:00 pm		at Southern Miss	L 60–79	16–10 (7–8)	Reed Green Coliseum (1,237); Hattiesburg, MS
02/25/2017; 7:00 pm		at Louisiana Tech	L 51–62	16–11 (7–9)	Thomas Assembly Center (2,025); Ruston, LA
03/02/2017; 7:00 pm		Marshall	W 84–74	17–11 (8–9)	Tudor Fieldhouse (430); Houston, TX
03/04/2017; 2:00 pm		WKU	L 75–80	17–12 (8–10)	Tudor Fieldhouse (829); Houston, TX
Conference USA Women's Tournament
03/08/2017; 6:30 pm		vs. UTSA; First Round	W 75–63	18–12	Bartow Arena (1,001); Birmingham, AL
03/09/2017; 6:30 pm		vs. Middle Tennessee; Quarterfinals	L 59–61	18–13	Bartow Arena; Birmingham, AL
WBI
03/16/2017*; 7:00 pm		Lamar; First Round	W 73–72	19–13	Tudor Fieldhouse (306); Houston, TX
03/19/2017*; 2:00 pm		Texas–Rio Grande Valley; Quarterfinals	W 73–63	20–13	Tudor Fieldhouse (460); Houston, TX
03/23/2017*; 7:00 pm		Idaho; Semifinals	W 86–80	21–13	Tudor Fieldhouse (287); Houston, TX
03/26/2017*; 4:00 pm		UNC Greensboro; Championship Game	W 74–62	22–13	Tudor Fieldhouse (532); Houston, TX
*Non-conference game. ^{#}Rankings from AP Poll. (#) Tournament seedings in parentheses. All times are in Central Time.

== See also ==
- 2016–17 Rice Owls men's basketball team
