= Covenant Christian School (Palm Bay, Florida) =

School in Palm Bay, Florida, United States

Location
- 720 Emerson Dr NE; Palm Bay, (Brevard County), Florida 32907; United States; 28.0185°N 80.6593°W

Information
- School type: Private 501(c)(3), combined elementary, middle and high school
- Denomination: Presbyterian Church in America
- Established: 1993
- Status: Permanently closed
- Authority: Covenant Presbyterian Church (same location)
- CEEB code: 101403
- NCES School ID: A9302774
- Headmaster: Ken Ingraham
- Faculty: 25.0 (on an FTE basis)
- Grades: K–12
- Gender: Coeducational
- Enrollment: 302 (2009-2010 school year)
  - Kindergarten: 14
  - Grade 1: 18
  - Grade 2: 17
  - Grade 3: 15
  - Grade 4: 21
  - Grade 5: 25
  - Grade 6: 23
  - Grade 7: 27
  - Grade 8: 27
  - Grade 9: 25
  - Grade 10: 21
  - Grade 11: 28
  - Grade 12: 41
- Student to teacher ratio: 12.1
- Colors: Navy and Carolina Blue
- Accreditation: Christian Schools of Florida; Southern Association of Colleges and Schools/Council on Accreditation and School Improvement (SACS/CASI)

Covenant Christian School was a private Christian school located in Palm Bay, Florida. The school educated students in Kindergarten to 12th grade. The school was founded as a ministry of Covenant Presbyterian Church of Palm Bay in 1993. It is no longer associated with the church. The school announced that it would merge with Calvary Chapel Academy on their campus beginning in the fall of 2021, making the 2020–2021 school year the final one for the school. The final school day and chapel was on May 21 with the final graduation on May 28.

The school building is now a part of the Pineapple Cove Academy campuses located throughout Palm Bay as of 2023.
