= Michelle Clark-Heard =

American basketball player and coach

Current position
- Title: Head coach
- Team: Mercer
- Conference: SoCon
- Record: 0–0 (–)

Biographical details
- Born: July 27, 1968 (age 58); Louisville, Kentucky, U.S.

Playing career
- 1987–1990: Western Kentucky

Coaching career (HC unless noted)
- 1998–2002: Nebraska (assistant)
- 2002–2005: Cincinnati (assistant)
- 2005–2007: Kentucky State
- 2007–2012: Louisville (assistant)
- 2012–2018: Western Kentucky
- 2018–2023: Cincinnati
- 2024–present: Mercer

Administrative career (AD unless noted)
- 2023–2024: Mississippi State (assistant A.D. for women's basketball)

Head coaching record
- Overall: 252–147 (.632)

Michelle Clark-Heard (born July 27, 1968) is the head coach for the Mercer Bears women's basketball team.

== Career ==
In her first year at Western Kentucky University her team posted a 22–11 record, after going 9–21 the season prior to her arrival.

In 2018, the University of Cincinnati hired her as the head coach for the Cincinnati women's basketball team. In her first season, she led the team to more than 20 wins for the first time since 2003 and at least 12 conference wins for the first time since 1999.

On March 7, 2023, she was fired as the head coach of the Cincinnati women's basketball team. She finishes with an overall record of 74–74 and a conference record of 35–46.

On May 17, 2023, Mississippi State University announced that she was hired as the Assistant Athletic Director for Women's Basketball.

== Career statistics ==
Legend
GP	Games played	GS	Games started	MPG	Minutes per game	RPG	Rebounds per game
APG	Assists per game	SPG	Steals per game	BPG	Blocks per game	PPG	Points per game
TO	Turnovers per game	FG%	Field-goal percentage	3P%	3-point field-goal percentage	FT%	Free-throw percentage
**Bold**	Career best	°	League leader

=== College ===
Year	Team	GP	GS	MPG	FG%	3P%	FT%	RPG	APG	SPG	BPG	TO	PPG
1987–88	Western Kentucky	**34**	-	-	43.5	0.0	59.6	5.5	0.2	0.4	0.2	-	6.9
1988–89	Western Kentucky	31	-	-	40.0	0.0	**67.0**	**6.9**	0.4	**0.7**	**0.5**	-	7.3
1990–91	Western Kentucky	29	-	-	**48.8**	0.0	60.8	5.7	**0.6**	0.5	0.4	-	**8.7**
**Career**		94	-	-	44.1	0.0	62.6	6.1	0.4	0.5	0.4	-	7.6
Statistics retrieved from Sports-Reference.

== Head coaching record ==
Record table
Season	Team	Overall	Conference	Standing	Postseason
**Kentucky State** (Southern Intercollegiate Athletic Conference) (2005–2007)
2005–06	Kentucky State	5–23	4–12	9th	
2006–07	Kentucky State	19–9	12–4	T-4th	
Kentucky State:		24–32 (.429)	16–16 (.500)		
**Western Kentucky** (Sun Belt Conference) (2012–2014)
2012–13	Western Kentucky	22–11	13–7	3rd	WNIT Second Round
2013–14	Western Kentucky	24–9	13–5	2nd	NCAA 1st Round
Western Kentucky (Sun Belt):		46–20 (.697)	26–12 (.684)		
**Western Kentucky** (Conference USA) (2014–2018)
2014–15	Western Kentucky	30–5	16–2	1st	NCAA 1st Round
2015–16	Western Kentucky	27–7	15–3	T-2nd	WNIT Quarterfinals
2016–17	Western Kentucky	27–7	16–2	1st	NCAA 1st Round
2017–18	Western Kentucky	24–8	12–4	2nd	NCAA 1st Round
Western Kentucky (C-USA):		108–27 (.800)	59–11 (.843)		
Western Kentucky (Overall):		154–47 (.766)			
**Cincinnati** (American Athletic Conference) (2018–2023)
2018–19	Cincinnati	24–11	12–4	3rd	WNIT Quarterfinals
2019–20	Cincinnati	22–9	11–5	2nd	
2020–21	Cincinnati	8–16	6–12	7th	
2021–22	Cincinnati	11–17	4–11	11th	
2022–23	Cincinnati	9–21	2–14	11th	
Cincinnati:		74–74 (.500)	35–46 (.432)		
**Mercer** (Southern Conference) (2024–present)
2024–25	Mercer	0–0	0–0		
Mercer:		0–0 (–)	0–0 (–)		
Total:		252–147 (.632)			
National champion Postseason invitational champion Conference regular season champion Conference regular season and conference tournament champion Division regular season champion Division regular season and conference tournament champion Conference tournament champion
