= Bethel–Tate High School =

Bethel-Tate High School
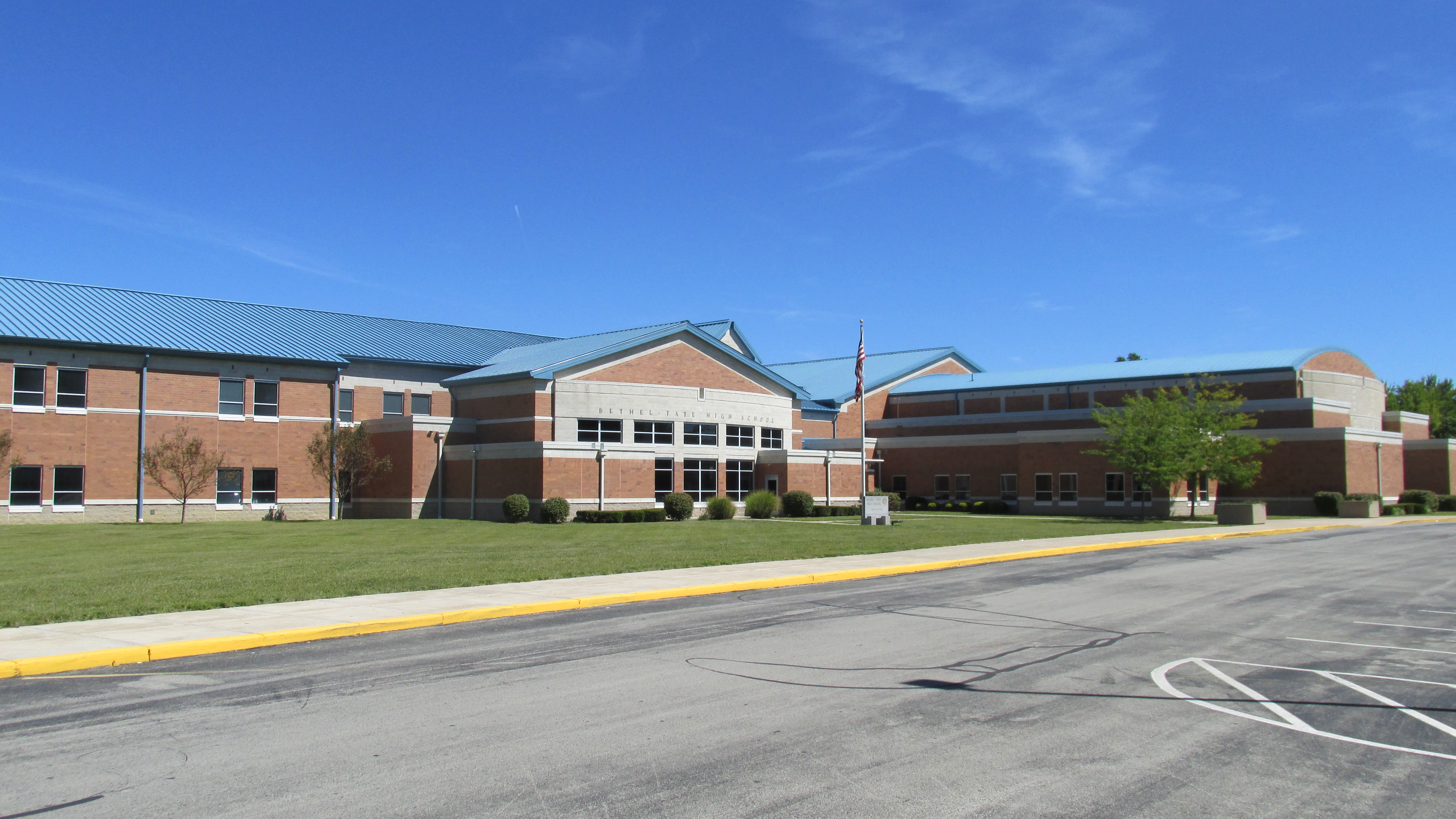

Location
- 3420 State Route 125; Bethel, Ohio 45106; United States
- Coordinates: 38°57′46″N 84°3′53″W

Information
- Type: Public high school
- School district: Bethel-Tate Local Schools
- Principal: George Sturgeon
- Grades: 9-12
- Gender: Co-educational
- Enrollment: 399 (2023-2024)
- Campus type: Rural
- Colors: Scarlet and Gray
- Athletics conference: Southern Buckeye Athletic/Academic Conference
- Mascot: Tiger
- Nickname: Tigers
- Website: www.betheltate.org/o/bths

Bethel-Tate High School is a public high school in Bethel, Ohio, United States. It is the only high school in the Bethel-Tate Local School District. The school mascot is the Tiger.

== Sports ==
Bethel-Tate is part of the Southern Buckeye Athletic/Academic Conference (SBAAC).
