= 2016–17 Xavier Musketeers women's basketball team =

Intercollegiate basketball season

2016–17 Xavier Musketeers women's basketball
- Conference: Big East Conference
- Record: 12–18 (4–14 Big East)
- Head coach: Brian Neal (6th season)
- Assistant coaches: Carla D. Morrow; Christian Stefanopoulos; Mark Stephens
- Home arena: Cintas Center

2016–17 Big East Conference women's basketball standings
	Conf.				Overall
Team	W		L	PCT	W		L	PCT
No. 19 DePaul*	16	–	2	.889	27	–	8	.771
Creighton	16	–	2	.889	24	–	8	.750
Marquette†	13	–	5	.722	25	–	8	.758
St. John's	11	–	7	.611	22	–	12	.647
Villanova	11	–	7	.611	20	–	14	.588
Georgetown	9	–	9	.500	17	–	13	.567
Providence	4	–	14	.222	12	–	18	.400
Xavier	4	–	14	.222	12	–	18	.400
Seton Hall	4	–	14	.222	12	–	19	.387
Butler	2	–	16	.111	6	–	25	.194
† 2017 Big East tournament winner * Tournament #1 seed As of March 29, 2017; Rankings from AP poll

The 2016–17 Xavier Musketeers women's basketball team represented Xavier University during the 2016–17 NCAA Division I women's basketball season. The Musketeers, led by sixth-year head coach Brian Neal, played their games at the Cintas Center and were fourth year members of the newly reorganized Big East Conference. They finished the season 12–18, 4–14 in Big East play to finish in a tie for seventh place. They lost in the first round of the Big East women's tournament to Butler.

== Roster ==
2016–17 Xavier Musketeers women's basketball team
Players
Coaches

Pos.	#	Name	Height	Year	Previous school	Hometown
G	0	Marquia Turner	5 ft 6 in (1.68 m)	Jr	Hoover HS	North Canton, OH
G	1	Kindell Fincher	5 ft 9 in (1.75 m)	RS So	Canterbury HS	Fort Wayne, IN
G	10	Ashley Gomez	5 ft 9 in (1.75 m)	Fr	Westmoore HS	Oklahoma City, OK
G	12	Jada Byrd	5 ft 9 in (1.75 m)	Jr	Redan HS	Lithonia GA
F	15	Megan Christopher	5 ft 8 in (1.73 m)	Fr	Turpin HS	Cincinnati, OH
G	20	Na'Teshia Owens	5 ft 5 in (1.65 m)	Fr	Mexia HS	Mexia, TN
F	21	Maddison Blackwell	5 ft 11 in (1.8 m)	Sr	Lincoln HS	Gahanna, OH
G	22	Erica Dawson	5 ft 8 in (1.73 m)	RS Jr	Marietta HS	Marietta, OH
F	23	Leah Schaefer	6 ft 1 in (1.85 m)	Sr	Highlands HS	Alexandria, KY
G	24	Martha Thompson	5 ft 8 in (1.73 m)	RS Jr	Solon HS	Solon, OH
F	25	Anniina Äijänen	6 ft 2 in (1.88 m)	Jr	Sammon Keskuslukio	Tampere, Finland
G	30	Raeshaun Gaffney	5 ft 8 in (1.73 m)	RS Sr	Fairfield HS/Virginia	Fairfield, OH
F	31	Tierra Floyd	6 ft 1 in (1.85 m)	RS Fr	St. Bernard-Elmwood Place HS	Toledo, OH
G	35	Jenna Crittendon	5 ft 9 in (1.75 m)	Sr	Ryle HS	Union, KY
F	45	Imani Partlow	6 ft 1 in (1.85 m)	RS So	Winton Woods HS	Cincinnati, OH

Head coach

- Brian Neal (Northern Kentucky)

Assistant coach(es)

- Carla D. Morrow (Tulsa)
- Christian Stefanopoulos (Thomas More)
- Mark Stephens (Morehead State)

Legend

- (C) Team captain
- (S) Suspended
- (I) Ineligible
- (W) Walk-on
- Injured
- Current redshirt

Roster

== Schedule ==
Date time, TV	Rank^{#}	Opponent^{#}	Result	Record	Site (attendance) city, state
Non-conference regular season
11/12/2016*; 1:00 pm, BEDN		Tennessee State; Lauren Hill Tipoff Classic	W 63–54	1–0	Cintas Center; Cincinnati, OH
11/18/2016*; 12:00 pm		Southeast Missouri State	W 54–48	2–0	Cintas Center (3,736); Cincinnati, OH
11/22/2016*; 7:00 pm		North Florida	W 83–46	3–0	Cintas Center (645); Cincinnati, OH
11/27/2016*; 2:00 pm		Arkansas–Pine Bluff	W 62–41	4–0	Cintas Center (688); Cincinnati, OH
12/01/2016*; 7:00 pm		Delaware State	W 86–53	5–0	Cintas Center (487); Cincinnati, OH
12/05/2016*; 7:00 pm		Michigan	W 61–58	6–0	Cintas Center (721); Cincinnati, OH
12/08/2016*; 7:00 pm		at Wake Forest	L 45–58	6–1	LJVM Coliseum (416); Winston-Salem, NC
12/11/2016*; 2:00 pm		at Cincinnati; Skyline Chili Crosstown Shootout	W 71–62	7–1	Fifth Third Arena (1,362); Cincinnati, OH
12/19/2016*; 5:15 pm		vs. No. 20 Oklahoma; Puerto Rico Classic	L 69–81	7–2	South Point Arena; Enterprise, NV
12/20/2016*; 3:00 pm		vs. Southern Miss; Puerto Rico Classic	L 59–73	7–3	South Point Arena (83); Enterprise, NV
12/21/2016*; 7:45 pm		vs. Kennesaw State; Puerto Rico Classic	W 75–52	8–3	South Point Arena (120); Enterprise, NV
Big East regular season
12/28/2016; 7:00 pm, BEDN		at Providence	W 54–51	9–3 (1–0)	Alumni Hall (477); Providence, RI
12/30/2016; 8:05 pm, BEDN		at Creighton	L 52–63	9–4 (1–1)	D. J. Sokol Arena (1,104); Omaha, NE
01/02/2017; 7:00 pm, CBSSN		St. John's	L 48–65	9–5 (1–2)	Cintas Center (671); Cincinnati, OH
01/04/2017; 7:00 pm, BEDN		Seton Hall	W 72–64	10–5 (2–2)	Cintas Center (620); Cincinnati, OH
01/08/2017; 2:00 pm, BEDN		Butler	L 62–65 ^{OT}	10–6 (2–3)	Cintas Center (923); Cincinnati, OH
01/13/2017; 8:00 pm, BEDN		at Marquette	L 61–85	10–7 (2–4)	Al McGuire Center (2,419); Milwaukee, WI
01/15/2017; 3:00 pm, BEDN		at No. 21 DePaul	L 69–85	10–8 (2–5)	McGrath-Phillips Arena (2,311); Chicago, IL
01/20/2017; 8:00 pm, FS1		Georgetown	L 64–69 ^{OT}	10–9 (2–6)	Cintas Center (1,730); Cincinnati, OH
01/22/2017; 5:00 pm, BEDN		Villanova	L 49–72	10–10 (2–7)	Cintas Center (1,016); Cincinnati, OH
01/27/2017; 7:00 pm, BEDN		at Seton Hall	L 62–71	10–11 (2–8)	Walsh Gymnasium (783); South Orange, NJ
01/29/2017; 3:00 pm, BEDN		at St. John's	L 55–64	10–12 (2–9)	Madison Square Garden; New York City, NY
02/04/2017; 1:00 pm, BEDN		at Butler	W 53–43	11–12 (3–9)	Hinkle Fieldhouse (1,043); Indianapolis, IN
02/10/2017; 7:00 pm, BEDN		No. 18 DePaul	L 43–70	11–13 (3–10)	Cintas Center (2,770); Cincinnati, OH
02/12/2017; 2:00 pm, BEDN		Marquette	L 71–86	11–14 (3–11)	Cintas Center (2,185); Cincinnati, OH
02/17/2017; 7:30 pm, FS1		at Villanova	L 71–76 ^{2OT}	11–15 (3–12)	The Pavilion (1,019); Villanova, PA
02/19/2017; 2:00 pm, BEDN		at Georgetown	L 63–81	11–16 (3–13)	McDonough Gymnasium (891); Washington, D.C.
02/24/2017; 7:00 pm, FS2		Creighton	L 57–67	11–17 (3–14)	Cintas Center (1,987); Cincinnati, OH
02/26/2017; 11:30 am, BEDN		Providence	W 67–57	11–18 (4–14)	Cintas Center (938); Cincinnati, OH
Big East Women's Tournament
03/04/2017; 5:00 pm, BEDN		vs. Butler; First Round	L 66–68	11–19	Al McGuire Center; Milwaukee, WI
*Non-conference game. ^{#}Rankings from AP Poll. (#) Tournament seedings in parentheses. All times are in Eastern Time.

== See also ==
- 2016–17 Xavier Musketeers men's basketball team
