= 2016–17 Marquette Golden Eagles women's basketball team =

Intercollegiate basketball season

2016–17 Marquette Golden Eagles women's basketball
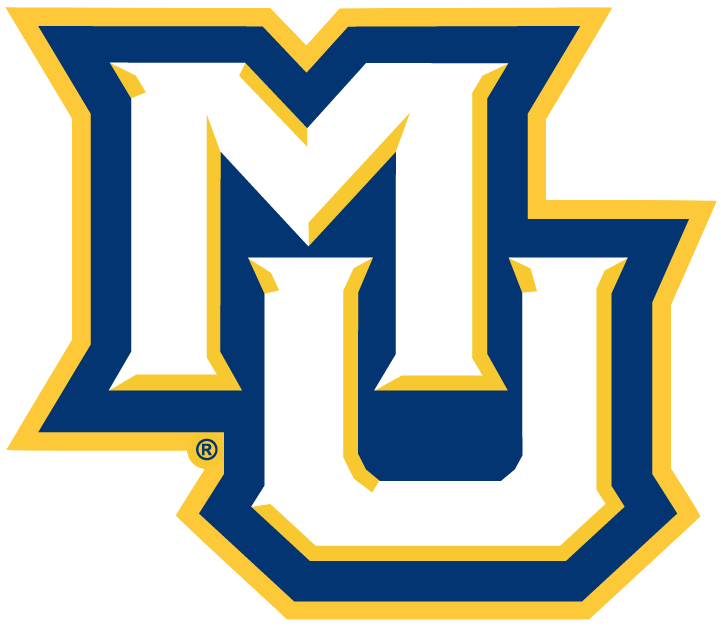

Big East tournament Champions

NCAA Women's Tournament, first round
- Conference: Big East

Ranking
- Coaches: No. 25
- Record: 25–8 (13–5 Big East)
- Head coach: Carolyn Kieger (3rd season)
- Assistant coaches: Ginny Boggess; Scott Merritt; Vernette Skeete
- Home arena: Al McGuire Center

2016–17 Big East Conference women's basketball standings
	Conf.				Overall
Team	W		L	PCT	W		L	PCT
No. 19 DePaul*	16	–	2	.889	27	–	8	.771
Creighton	16	–	2	.889	24	–	8	.750
Marquette†	13	–	5	.722	25	–	8	.758
St. John's	11	–	7	.611	22	–	12	.647
Villanova	11	–	7	.611	20	–	14	.588
Georgetown	9	–	9	.500	17	–	13	.567
Providence	4	–	14	.222	12	–	18	.400
Xavier	4	–	14	.222	12	–	18	.400
Seton Hall	4	–	14	.222	12	–	19	.387
Butler	2	–	16	.111	6	–	25	.194
† 2017 Big East tournament winner * Tournament #1 seed As of March 29, 2017; Rankings from AP poll

The 2016–17 Marquette Golden Eagles women's basketball team represented Marquette University in the 2016–17 NCAA Division I women's basketball season. The Golden Eagles, led by third year head coach Carolyn Kieger, played their home games at the Al McGuire Center and were members of the Big East Conference. They finished the season 25–8, 13–5 in Big East play to finish in third place. They won the Big East tournament title for the first time in school history and earned an automatic bid to the NCAA women's tournament where they received a No. 5 seed in the Stockton Region. They were upset by No. 12 seed Quinnipiac in the first round.

== Roster ==
2016–17 Marquette Golden Eagles women's basketball team
Players
Coaches

Pos.	#	Name	Height	Year	Previous school	Hometown
G	1	Danielle King	5 ft 5 in (1.65 m)	So	Bloom Township	Chicago, IL
G	3	McKayla Yentz	6 ft 1 in (1.85 m)	Sr	Sun Prairie	Sun Prairie, WI
G	5	Natisha Hiedeman	5 ft 8 in (1.73 m)	So	Green Bay Southwest	Green Bay, WI
F	10	Sandra Dahling	5 ft 9 in (1.75 m)	So	None	Stockholm, Sweden
G	11	Allazia Blockton	6 ft 0 in (1.83 m)	Fr	Dominican	Milwaukee, WI
F	12	Erika Davenport	5 ft 11 in (1.8 m)	So	Clarkston	Clarkston, MI
G	13	Olivia Moskari	5 ft 9 in (1.75 m)	So	None	Helsinki, Finland
G	15	Amani Wilborn	5 ft 9 in (1.75 m)	So	Riverside University	Milwaukee, WI
F	20	Altia Anderson	6 ft 2 in (1.88 m)	Fr	Woodbridge	Bridgeville, DE
G	30	Isabelle Spingola	6 ft 0 in (1.83 m)	Fr	Whitney Young	Chicago, IL
C	31	Shantelle Valentine	6 ft 3 in (1.91 m)	Jr	St. Roch	Toronto, ON
G	42	Lauren Van Kleunen	6 ft 2 in (1.88 m)	Fr	Mason	Mason, OH
C	44	Meghan Mandel	6 ft 4 in (1.93 m)	Fr	Orono	Plymouth, MN

Head coach

- Carolyn Kieger (Marquette)

Assistant coach(es)

- Ginny Boggess (Wingate)
- Scott Merritt (Marquette)
- Vernette Skeete (Alcorn State)

Legend

- (C) Team captain
- (S) Suspended
- (I) Ineligible
- (W) Walk-on
- Injured
- Current redshirt

Roster

== Schedule ==
Date time, TV	Rank^{#}	Opponent^{#}	Result	Record	Site (attendance) city, state
Exhibition
11/06/2016*; 1:00 pm		Minnesota State	W 78–75		Al McGuire Center; Milwaukee, WI
Non-conference regular season
11/11/2016*; 7:00 pm		Longwood	W 87–37	1–0	Al McGuire Center (1,225); Milwaukee, WI
11/15/2016*; 7:00 pm		Saint Francis (PA)	W 104–91	2–0	Al McGuire Center (841); Milwaukee, WI
11/19/2016*; 2:00 pm		No. 18 Arizona State	W 75–63	3–0	Al McGuire Center (2,109); Milwaukee, WI
11/22/2016*; 8:00 pm, P12N		at No. 22 Oregon State	W 74–73	4–0	Gill Coliseum (2,884); Corvallis, OR
11/25/2016*; 6:00 pm		vs. Santa Clara; Tiger Turkey Tip-Off Thanksgiving Tournament	L 62–65	4–1	Alex G. Spanos Center; Stockton, CA
11/26/2016*; 5:30 pm		at Pacific; Tiger Turkey Tip-Off Thanksgiving Tournament	W 89–75	5–1	Alex G. Spanos Center (400); Stockton, CA
12/02/2016*; 7:00 pm		Western Illinois	W 77–61	6–1	Al McGuire Center (1,222); Milwaukee, WI
12/06/2016*; 7:30 pm, SPCSN		Green Bay	L 63–78	6–2	Al McGuire Center (903); Milwaukee, WI
12/11/2016*; 1:00 pm, BTN		at Wisconsin	W 81–75	7–2	Kohl Center (4,974); Madison, WI
12/18/2016*; 3:00 pm		Milwaukee	W 85–74	8–2	Al McGuire Center (1,218); Milwaukee, WI
12/21/2016*; 11:30 am		New Mexico	W 62–52	9–2	Al McGuire Center (3,700); Milwaukee, WI
Big East regular season
12/28/2016; 11:00 am, FSWI		at Villanova	W 77–71	10–2 (1–0)	The Pavilion (509); Villanova, PA
12/30/2016; 1:00 pm, FSWI		at Georgetown	W 84–77	11–2 (2–0)	McDonough Gymnasium (319); Washington, D.C.
01/02/2017; 7:30 pm, FS1		Creighton	L 63–83	11–3 (2–1)	Al McGuire Center (1,144); Milwaukee, WI
01/04/2017; 7:00 pm, BEDN		Providence	W 79–74	12–3 (3–1)	Al McGuire Center (1,041); Milwaukee, WI
01/08/2017; 1:00 pm, BEDN		at St. John's	L 64–70	12–4 (3–2)	Carnesecca Arena (542); Queens, NY
01/10/2017; 6:00 pm, BEDN		at Seton Hall	W 83–77	13–4 (4–2)	Walsh Gymnasium (744); South Orange, NJ
01/13/2017; 7:00 pm, BEDN		Xavier	W 85–61	14–4 (5–2)	Al McGuire Center (2,419); Milwaukee, WI
01/15/2017; 12:00 pm, FS1		Butler	W 91–53	15–4 (6–2)	Al McGuire Center (1,415); Milwaukee, WI
01/21/2017; 7:00 pm, BEDN		at No. 19 DePaul	W 102–101	16–4 (7–2)	McGrath-Phillips Arena (2,481); Chicago, IL
01/27/2017; 6:00 pm, BEDN		at Providence	L 64–66	16–5 (7–3)	Alumni Hall (520); Providence, RI
01/29/2017; 1:05 pm, BEDN		at Creighton	L 77–80	16–6 (7–4)	D. J. Sokol Arena (996); Omaha, NE
02/03/2017; 11:00 am, FSWI		Seton Hall	W 103–60	17–6 (8–4)	Al McGuire Center (2,524); Milwaukee, WI
02/05/2017; 1:00 pm, BEDN		St. John's	L 72–82	17–7 (8–5)	Al McGuire Center (1,225); Milwaukee, WI
02/10/2017; 6:00 pm, BEDN		at Butler	W 72–66	18–7 (9–5)	Hinkle Fieldhouse (882); Indianapolis, IN
02/12/2017; 1:00 pm, BEDN		at Xavier	W 86–71	19–7 (10–5)	Cintas Center (2,185); Cincinnati, OH
02/19/2017; 1:00 pm, FS2		No. 17 DePaul	W 96–81	20–7 (11–5)	Al McGuire Center (1,733); Milwaukee, WI
02/24/2017; 7:00 pm, BEDN		Georgetown	W 80–70	21–7 (12–5)	Al McGuire Center (1,156); Milwaukee, WI
02/26/2017; 2:00 pm, BEDN		Villanova	W 62–53	22–7 (13–5)	Al McGuire Center (1,614); Milwaukee, WI
Big East Women's Tournament
03/05/2017; 2:30 pm, FS2	(3)	vs. (6) Georgetown; Quarterfinals	W 80–66	23–7	Al McGuire Center (2,815); Milwaukee, WI
03/06/2017; 3:00 pm, FS1	(3)	vs. (2) Creighton; Semifinals	W 72–65	24–7	Al McGuire Center; Milwaukee, WI
03/07/2017; 8:00 pm, FS1	(3)	vs. (1) No. 17 DePaul; Championship	W 86–78	25–7	Al McGuire Center (3,166); Milwaukee, WI
NCAA Women's Tournament
03/18/2017*; 12:30 pm, ESPN2	(5 S)	vs. (12 S) Quinnipiac; First Round	L 65–68	25–8	Watsco Center (2,009); Coral Gables, FL
*Non-conference game. ^{#}Rankings from AP Poll. (#) Tournament seedings in parentheses. S=Stockton Region. All times are in Central.

== Rankings ==
2016–17 NCAA Division I women's basketball rankings

+ Regular season polls	Poll	Pre- Season	Week 2	Week 3	Week 4	Week 5	Week 6	Week 7	Week 8	Week 9	Week 10	Week 11	Week 12	Week 13	Week 14	Week 15	Week 16	Week 17	Week 18	Week 19	Final
AP	NR	NR	RV	RV	RV	NR	NR	RV	RV	NR	NR	RV	NR	NR	NR	RV	NR	NR	RV	N/A	
Coaches	NR	NR	RV	RV	RV	NR	NR	NR	NR	NR	NR	RV	NR	NR	NR	RV	RV	RV	25	RV	

Legend
	Increase in ranking
	Decrease in ranking
	No change
(RV)	Received votes
(NR)	Not ranked

== See also ==
2016–17 Marquette Golden Eagles men's basketball team
