= 2016–17 St. John's Red Storm women's basketball team =

Intercollegiate basketball season

2016–17 St. John's Red Storm women's basketball

WNIT, Third Round
- Conference: Big East Conference
- Record: 22–12 (11–7 Big East)
- Head coach: Joe Tartamella (5th season)
- Assistant coaches: Tasha Pointer; Jonath Nicholas; Da'Shena Stevens
- Home arena: Carnesecca Arena

2016–17 Big East Conference women's basketball standings
	Conf.				Overall
Team	W		L	PCT	W		L	PCT
No. 19 DePaul*	16	–	2	.889	27	–	8	.771
Creighton	16	–	2	.889	24	–	8	.750
Marquette†	13	–	5	.722	25	–	8	.758
St. John's	11	–	7	.611	22	–	12	.647
Villanova	11	–	7	.611	20	–	14	.588
Georgetown	9	–	9	.500	17	–	13	.567
Providence	4	–	14	.222	12	–	18	.400
Xavier	4	–	14	.222	12	–	18	.400
Seton Hall	4	–	14	.222	12	–	19	.387
Butler	2	–	16	.111	6	–	25	.194
† 2017 Big East tournament winner * Tournament #1 seed As of March 29, 2017; Rankings from AP poll

The 2016–17 St. John's Red Storm women's basketball team represented St. John's University during the 2016–17 NCAA Division I women's basketball season. The Red Storm, led by fifth-year head coach Joe Tartamella, played their games at Carnesecca Arena and were members of the Big East Conference. They finished the season 22–12, 11–7 in Big East play to finish in a tie for fourth place. They advanced to the semifinals of the Big East women's basketball tournament where they lost to DePaul. They were invited to the Women's National Invitation Tournament where they defeated Sacred Heart and Harvard in the first and second rounds, before losing Michigan in the third round.

== Roster ==
2016–17 St. John's Red Storm women's basketball team
Players
Coaches

Pos.	#	Name	Height	Year	Previous school	Hometown
G	0	Alisha Kebbe	5 ft 10 in (1.78 m)	Fr	Neumann-Goretti	Philadelphia, PA
G	1	Tamesha Alexander	5 ft 7 in (1.7 m)	Jr	The Shipley School	Philadelphia, PA
G	2	Kendyl Nunn	5 ft 10 in (1.78 m)	RS Sr	Morgan Park; UIC	Chicago, IL
G	3	Tiana England	5 ft 7 in (1.7 m)	Fr	Stamford	Stamford, CT
G	4	Aaliyah Lewis	5 ft 5 in (1.65 m)	Sr	Bishop Ford	Staten Island, NY
G	5	Shamachya Duncan	5 ft 6 in (1.68 m)	Fr	The Patrick School	Staten Island, NY
G	13	Crystal Simmons	5 ft 10 in (1.78 m)	Jr	Life Center Academy	Madrid, Spain
G	15	Andrayah Adams	5 ft 10 in (1.78 m)	Fr	Como Park	Minneapolis, MN
G/F	20	Akina Wellere	5 ft 11 in (1.8 m)	So	Gwendolyn Brooks College Preparatory Academy	Chicago, IL
F	23	Jordan Agustus	6 ft 1 in (1.85 m)	So	St. Mary's	Bronx, NY
F	24	Jade Walker	6 ft 1 in (1.85 m)	Sr	DePaul Catholic	Maplewood, NJ
F	33	Sandra Udobi	6 ft 2 in (1.88 m)	RS Sr	Life Center Academy	Delta State, Nigeria
F	34	Maya Singleton	6 ft 0 in (1.83 m)	Jr	Trinity Valley CC	Indian Head, MD
F	35	Imani Littleton	6 ft 3 in (1.91 m)	Jr	The Bishop's School	San Diego, CA

Head coach

- Joe Tartamella (James Madison)

Assistant coach(es)

- Tasha Pointer (Rutgers)
- Jonath Nicholas (Trinity (TX))
- Da'Shena Stevens (St. John's)

Legend

- (C) Team captain
- (S) Suspended
- (I) Ineligible
- (W) Walk-on
- Injured
- Current redshirt

Roster

== Schedule ==
Date time, TV	Rank^{#}	Opponent^{#}	Result	Record	Site (attendance) city, state
Non-conference regular season
11/13/2016*; 2:00 pm		at William & Mary	W 73–57	1–0	Kaplan Arena (471); Williamsburg, VA
11/17/2016*; 7:00 pm, ESPN3		Duquesne	L 65–71	1–1	Carnesecca Arena (637); Queens, NY
11/20/2016*; 7:00 pm, ESPN3		No. 22 Miami (FL)	L 50–62	1–2	Carnesecca Arena (695); Queens, NY
11/25/2016*; 6:30 pm		vs. Virginia; South Point Thanksgiving Shootout	W 66–55	2–2	South Point Arena; Enterprise, NV
11/26/2016*; 4:00 pm		vs. No. 23 Arizona State; South Point Thanksgiving Shootout	L 41–54	2–3	South Point Arena; Enterprise, NV
11/30/2016*; 4:00 pm, ESPN3		Albany	W 54–36	3–3	Carnesecca Arena (529); Queens, NY
12/03/2016*; 2:00 pm, ESPN3		Lafayette	W 64–46	4–3	Carnesecca Arena (750); Queens, NY
12/07/2016*; 7:00 pm, ESPN3		Rutgers	W 65–39	5–3	Carnesecca Arena (519); Queens, NY
12/13/2016*; 7:00 pm		at Fordham	W 59–45	6–3	Rose Hill Gymnasium (351); Bronx, NY
12/17/2016*; 7:00 pm, ESPN3		Wagner	W 62–34	7–3	Carnesecca Arena (589); Queens, NY
12/21/2016*; 11:00 am, ESPN3		James Madison	W 74–63	8–3	Carnesecca Arena (5,602); Queens, NY
Big East regular season
12/30/2016; 7:00 pm, FS2		at Seton Hall	L 59–64	8–4 (0–1)	Walsh Gymnasium (1,327); South Orange, NJ
01/02/2017; 7:00 pm, CBSSN		at Xavier	W 65–48	9–4 (1–1)	Cintas Center (671); Cincinnati, OH
01/05/2017; 7:00 pm, BEDN		at Butler	W 62–41	10–4 (2–1)	Hinkle Fieldhouse (426); Indianapolis, IN
01/08/2017; 7:00 pm, BEDN		Marquette	W 70–64	11–4 (3–1)	Carnesecca Arena (542); Queens, NY
01/10/2017; 7:00 pm, BEDN		No. 21 DePaul	L 66–78	11–5 (3–2)	Carnesecca Arena (565); Queens, NY
01/13/2017; 7:00 pm, FS1		at Georgetown	W 71–66	12–5 (4–2)	McDonough Gymnasium (709); Washington, D.C.
01/15/2017; 1:00 pm, BEDN		at Villanova	L 50–55	12–6 (4–3)	The Pavilion (909); Villanova, PA
01/20/2017; 7:00 pm, BEDN		Creighton	L 43–55	12–7 (4–4)	Carnesecca Arena (502); Queens, NY
01/22/2017; 2:00 pm, BEDN		Providence	W 60–50	13–7 (5–4)	Carnesecca Arena (646); Queens, NY
01/27/2017; 7:00 pm, BEDN		Butler	W 62–55	14–7 (6–4)	Carnesecca Arena (788); Queens, NY
01/29/2017; 3:00 pm, BEDN		Xavier	W 64–55	15–7 (7–4)	Madison Square Garden; New York City, NY
02/03/2017; 8:00 pm, BEDN		at No. 17 DePaul	L 51–54	15–8 (7–5)	McGrath-Phillips Arena (2,312); Chicago, IL
02/05/2017; 2:00 pm, BEDN		at Marquette	W 82–72	16–8 (8–5)	Al McGuire Center (1,225); Milwaukee, WI
02/10/2017; 8:00 pm, FS1		Villanova	L 56–66	16–9 (8–6)	Carnesecca Arena; Queens, NY
02/12/2017; 2:00 pm, BEDN		Georgetown	W 65–54	17–9 (9–6)	Carnesecca Arena (721); Queens, NY
02/17/2017; 7:00 pm, BEDN		at Providence	W 71–47	18–9 (10–6)	Alumni Hall (589); Providence, RI
02/19/2017; 6:30 pm, YES		at Creighton	L 60–67	18–10 (10–7)	D. J. Sokol Arena (1,140); Omaha, NE
02/26/2017; 2:00 pm, BEDN		Seton Hall	W 77–71	19–10 (11–7)	Carnesecca Arena (1,121); Queens, NY
Big East Women's Tournament
03/05/2017; 8:30 pm, FS2		vs. Villanova; Quarterfinals	W 56–40	20–10	Al McGuire Center (1,922); Milwaukee, WI
03/06/2017; 6:30 pm, FS1		vs. No. 17 DePaul; Semifinals	L 41–59	20–11	Al McGuire Center (2,511); Milwaukee, WI
WNIT
03/17/2017; 7:00 pm, ESPN3		Sacred Heart; First Round	W 72–43	21–11	Carnesecca Arena (773); Queens, NY
03/19/2017; 2:00 pm, ESPN3		Harvard; Second Round	W 62–57	22–11	Carnesecca Arena (535); Queens, NY
03/23/2017; 6:00 pm		at Michigan; Third Round	L 40–60	22–12	Crisler Center (685); Ann Arbor, MI
*Non-conference game. ^{#}Rankings from AP Poll. (#) Tournament seedings in parentheses. All times are in Eastern Time.

== Rankings ==
2016–17 NCAA Division I women's basketball rankings

Regular season polls
Poll	Pre- Season	Week 2	Week 3	Week 4	Week 5	Week 6	Week 7	Week 8	Week 9	Week 10	Week 11	Week 12	Week 13	Week 14	Week 15	Week 16	Week 17	Week 18	Week 19	Final
AP																				N/A
Coaches		RV																		

Legend
	Increase in ranking
	Decrease in ranking
	Not ranked previous week
(RV)	Received Votes

== See also ==
- 2016–17 St. John's Red Storm men's basketball team
