= 2016–17 Villanova Wildcats women's basketball team =

Intercollegiate basketball season

2016–17 Villanova Wildcats women's basketball

WNIT, Semifinals
- Conference: Big East Conference
- Record: 20–15 (11–7 Big East)
- Head coach: Harry Perretta (39th season)
- Assistant coaches: Joe Mullaney; Laura Kurz; Shanette Lee
- Home arena: The Pavilion

2016–17 Big East Conference women's basketball standings
	Conf.				Overall
Team	W		L	PCT	W		L	PCT
No. 19 DePaul*	16	–	2	.889	27	–	8	.771
Creighton	16	–	2	.889	24	–	8	.750
Marquette†	13	–	5	.722	25	–	8	.758
St. John's	11	–	7	.611	22	–	12	.647
Villanova	11	–	7	.611	20	–	14	.588
Georgetown	9	–	9	.500	17	–	13	.567
Providence	4	–	14	.222	12	–	18	.400
Xavier	4	–	14	.222	12	–	18	.400
Seton Hall	4	–	14	.222	12	–	19	.387
Butler	2	–	16	.111	6	–	25	.194
† 2017 Big East tournament winner * Tournament #1 seed As of March 29, 2017; Rankings from AP poll

The 2016–17 Villanova Wildcats women's basketball team represented Villanova University in the 2016–17 NCAA Division I women's basketball season. The Wildcats, led by thirty-ninth year head coach Harry Perretta, played their games at The Pavilion and are members of the Big East Conference. They finished the season 20–15, 11–7 in Big East play to finish in a tie for fourth place. They lost in the quarterfinals of the Big East women's tournament to St. John's. They were invited to the Women's National Invitation Tournament, where they defeated Princeton, Drexel and James Madison in the first, second and third rounds, Indiana in the quarterfinals before losing to Michigan in the semifinals.

== Roster ==
2016–17 Villanova Wildcats women's basketball team
Players
Coaches

Pos.	#	Name	Height	Year	Previous school	Hometown
G	0	Cameron Onken	5 ft 10 in (1.78 m)	Fr	Lafayette Central Catholic	Lafayette, IN
F	1	Bridget Herlihy	6 ft 2 in (1.88 m)	RS Fr	Braintree	Braintree, MA
G	2	Alex Louin (W)	6 ft 0 in (1.83 m)	Jr	Mount St. Joseph Academy	Doylestown, PA
G	4	Karlie Crispin	5 ft 6 in (1.68 m)	Sr	Pitman	Pitman, NJ
G	10	Raven James	5 ft 6 in (1.68 m)	Fr	St. Paul VI	Upper Marlboro, MD
G	11	Jordan Dillard	6 ft 0 in (1.83 m)	Sr	Decatur	Conyers, GA
C	12	Megan Quinn	6 ft 2 in (1.88 m)	Jr	Episcopal Academy	Berwyn, PA
F	14	Brianna Herlihy	6 ft 0 in (1.83 m)	Fr	Braintree	Braintree, MA
G/F	21	Jannah Tucker	6 ft 0 in (1.83 m)	Jr	New Town	Baltimore, MD
G	24	Nicolette Juliana	5 ft 8 in (1.73 m)	Jr	Bishop Shanahan	West Chester, PA
F	30	Mary Gedaka	6 ft 1 in (1.85 m)	Fr	Gloucester Catholic	Mullica Hill, NJ
G	31	Adrianna Hahn	5 ft 6 in (1.68 m)	So	Ursuline Academy	Wilmington, DE
F	32	Samantha Wilkes	6 ft 1 in (1.85 m)	Sr	Immaculate Heart Academy	Fair Lawn, NJ
G	45	Grace Stant	6 ft 0 in (1.83 m)	RS Fr	Rumson Fair Haven	Fair Haven, NJ

Head coach

- Harry Perretta (Lycoming)

Assistant coach(es)

- Joe Mullaney (Providence)
- Laura Kurz (Villanova)
- Shanette Lee (Villanova)

Legend

- (C) Team captain
- (S) Suspended
- (I) Ineligible
- (W) Walk-on
- Injured
- Current redshirt

Roster

== Schedule ==
Date time, TV	Rank^{#}	Opponent^{#}	Result	Record	Site (attendance) city, state
Exhibition
11/02/2016*; 7:00 pm		at East Stroudsburg	W 78–52		Koehler Fieldhouse (850); East Stroudsburg, PA
Regular season
11/11/2016*; 7:30 pm		vs. No. 10 Mississippi State; Maine Tip-Off Tournament semifinals	L 62–108	0–1	Cross Insurance Center (2,416); Bangor, ME
11/12/2016*; 5:00 pm		vs. Purdue; Maine Tip-Off Tournament 3rd place game	W 58–44	1–1	Cross Insurance Center; Bangor, ME
11/20/2016*; 1:00 pm		George Washington	L 69–72	1–2	The Pavilion (735); Villanova, PA
11/24/2016*; 4:45 pm		vs. Troy; San Juan Shootout	L 85–93	1–3	Ocean Center; Dayton Beach, FL
11/25/2016*; 2:30 pm		vs. VCU; San Juan Shootout	L 66–68	1–4	Ocean Center; Dayton Beach, FL
11/30/2016*; 7:00 pm		La Salle	W 52–49	2–4	The Pavilion (801); Villanova, PA
12/03/2016*; 4:00 pm		at Saint Joseph's	W 62–54	3–4	Hagan Arena (1,243); Philadelphia, PA
12/05/2016*; 7:00 pm		Lehigh	W 59–37	4–4	The Pavilion (509); Villanova, PA
12/10/2016*; 1:00 pm		Temple	L 48–83	4–5	The Pavilion (441); Villanova, PA
12/21/2016*; 7:00 pm, ACCN Extra		at No. 17 Duke	L 50–68	4–6	Cameron Indoor Stadium (3,377); Durham, NC
12/28/2016; 12:00 pm, WPHL		Marquette	L 71–77	4–7 (0–1)	The Pavilion (509); Villanova, PA
12/30/2016; 7:00 pm, BEDN		DePaul	L 50–80	4–8 (0–2)	The Pavilion (635); Villanova, PA
01/04/2017; 7:00 pm, BEDN		Georgetown	W 71–50	5–8 (1–2)	The Pavilion (435); Villanova, PA
01/08/2017; 2:00 pm, FS1		at Providence	W 64–59	6–8 (2–2)	Alumni Hall (564); Providence, RI
01/10/2017; 8:00 pm, BEDN		at Creighton	L 46–60	6–9 (2–3)	D. J. Sokol Arena (707); Omaha, NE
01/13/2017; 11:30 am, BEDN		Seton Hall	W 69–52	7–9 (3–3)	The Pavilion (2,109); Villanova, PA
01/15/2017; 1:00 pm, BEDN		St. John's	W 55–50	8–9 (4–3)	The Pavilion (909); Villanova, PA
01/18/2017*; 7:00 pm		at Penn	W 60–48	9–9	Palestra (575); Philadelphia, PA
01/20/2017; 7:00 pm, BEDN		at Butler	W 70–69 ^{OT}	10–9 (5–3)	Hinkle Fieldhouse (603); Indianapolis, IN
01/22/2017; 5:00 pm, BEDN		at Xavier	W 72–49	11–9 (6–3)	Cintas Center (1,016); Cincinnati, OH
01/28/2017; 1:00 pm, BEDN		at Georgetown	L 49–53	11–10 (6–4)	McDonough Gymnasium (1,311); Washington, D.C.
02/03/2017; 7:00 pm, FS2		Creighton	L 44–47	11–11 (6–5)	The Pavilion (1,101); Villanova, PA
02/05/2017; 1:00 pm, BEDN		Providence	W 61–43	12–11 (7–5)	The Pavilion (1,309); Villanova, PA
02/10/2017; 8:00 pm, FS1		at St. John's	W 66–56	13–11 (8–5)	Carnesecca Arena; Queens, NY
02/12/2017; 2:00 pm, BEDN		at Seton Hall	W 87–52	14–11 (9–5)	Walsh Gymnasium (1,087); South Orange, NJ
02/17/2017; 7:00 pm, FS1		Xavier	W 76–71 ^{2OT}	15–11 (10–5)	The Pavilion (1,019); Villanova, PA
02/19/2017; 1:00 pm, BEDN		Butler	W 61–58 ^{OT}	16–11 (11–5)	The Pavilion (1,041); Villanova, PA
02/24/2017; 8:00 pm, BEDN		at No. 19 DePaul	L 50–77	16–12 (11–6)	McGrath-Phillips Arena (2,368); Chicago, IL
02/26/2017; 3:00 pm, BEDN		at Marquette	L 53–62	16–13 (11–7)	Al McGuire Center (1,614); Milwaukee, WI
Big East Women's Tournament
03/05/2017; 9:30 pm, FS2		vs. St. John's; Quarterfinals	L 40–56	16–14	Al McGuire Center (1,922); Milwaukee, WI
WNIT
03/17/2017*; 6:00 pm		at Princeton; First Round	W 59–53	17–14	Jadwin Gymnasium (514); Princeton, NJ
03/19/2017*; 2:00 pm		at Drexel; Second Round	W 56–51	18–14	Daskalakis Athletic Center (599); Philadelphia, PA
03/23/2017*; 7:00 pm		at James Madison; Third Round	W 69–67 ^{OT}	19–14	JMU Convocation Center (1,712); Harrisonburg, VA
03/26/2017*; 2:00 pm		at Indiana; Quarterfinals	W 69–57	20–14	Simon Skjodt Assembly Hall (4,770); Bloomington, IN
03/29/2017*; 7:00 pm		at Michigan; Semifinals	L 61–65	20–15	Crisler Center (1,467); Ann Arbor, MI
*Non-conference game. ^{#}Rankings from AP Poll. (#) Tournament seedings in parentheses. All times are in Eastern Time.

== See also ==
- 2016–17 Villanova Wildcats men's basketball team
