= 2017 Big East women's basketball tournament =

- Classification: Division I
- Season: 2016–17
- Teams: 10
- Site: Al McGuire Center; Milwaukee, WI
- Champions: Marquette (1st title)
- Winning coach: Carolyn Kieger (1st title)
- MVP: Amani Wilborn (Marquette)
- Attendance: 12,546
- Television: FS1

2016–17 Big East Conference women's basketball standings
	Conf.				Overall
Team	W		L	PCT	W		L	PCT
No. 19 DePaul*	16	–	2	.889	27	–	8	.771
Creighton	16	–	2	.889	24	–	8	.750
Marquette†	13	–	5	.722	25	–	8	.758
St. John's	11	–	7	.611	22	–	12	.647
Villanova	11	–	7	.611	20	–	14	.588
Georgetown	9	–	9	.500	17	–	13	.567
Providence	4	–	14	.222	12	–	18	.400
Xavier	4	–	14	.222	12	–	18	.400
Seton Hall	4	–	14	.222	12	–	19	.387
Butler	2	–	16	.111	6	–	25	.194
† 2017 Big East tournament winner * Tournament #1 seed As of March 29, 2017; Rankings from AP poll

The 2017 Big East women's basketball tournament, also known as the 2017 Big East championship, was a tournament held from March 4 to 7, 2017, at Al McGuire Center on the Marquette University campus in Milwaukee. The host Marquette Golden Eagles won the tournament and with it an automatic trip to the NCAA women's tournament.

== Seeds ==
2017 Big East women's basketball tournament seeds and results
Seed	School	Conf.	Over.	Tiebreaker
1	DePaul†‡	16–2	24–6	2–0 vs. Creighton
2	Creighton†	16–2	22–6	0–2 vs. DePaul
3	Marquette	13–5	22–7	
4	Villanova	11–7	16-13	2–0 vs. St. John's
5	St. John's	11–7	19-10	0–2 vs. Villanova
6	Georgetown	9–9	17–11	
7	Xavier	4–14	12-17	2–0 vs. Providence, 1–1 vs. Seton Hall
8	Seton Hall	4–14	11–18	1–1 vs. Xavier, 1–1 vs. Providence
9	Providence	4–14	12–17	0–2 vs. Xavier, 1–1 vs. Seton Hall
10	Butler	2–16	5–24	
‡ – Big East regular season champions, and tournament No. 1 seed. † – Received a single-bye in the conference tournament. Overall records include all games played in the Big East tournament.

== Schedule ==
Game	Time*	Matchup^{#}	Television	Attendance
First round – Saturday, March 4
1	4:00 PM	#7 Xavier vs #10 Butler	BEDN	2,132
2	6:30 PM	#8 Seton Hall vs #9 Providence	BEDN	2,132
Quarterfinals – Sunday, March 5
3	12:00 PM	#2 Creighton vs #10 Butler	FS2	2,815
4	2:30 PM	#3 Marquette vs #6 Georgetown	FS2	2,815
5	6:00 PM	#1 DePaul vs #8 Seton Hall	FS2	1,922
6	8:30 PM	#4 Villanova vs #5 St. John's	FS2	1,922
Semifinals – Monday, March 6
7	3:00 PM	#2 Creighton vs. #3 Marquette	FS1	2,511
8	5:30 PM	#1 DePaul vs #5 St John's	FS1	2,511
Championship – Tuesday, March 7
9	8:00 PM	#3 Marquette vs. #1 DePaul	FS1	3,166
*Game Times in CT. #-Rankings denote tournament seed

== Bracket ==
Opening Round; March 4, 2017
8	Seton Hall	73
9	Providence	60
7	Xavier	66
10	Butler	68

Quarterfinals; March 5, 2017
1	DePaul	92
8	Seton Hall	60
4	Villanova	40
5	St. John's	56
2	Creighton	64
10	Butler	55
3	Marquette	80
6	Georgetown	66

Semifinals; March 6, 2017
1	DePaul	59
5	St John's	41
2	Creighton	65
3	Marquette	72

Championship; March 7, 2017
1	DePaul	78
3	Marquette	86

== See also ==
- 2017 Big East men's basketball tournament
