= 2016–17 Butler Bulldogs women's basketball team =

Intercollegiate basketball season

2016–17 Butler Bulldogs women's basketball
- Conference: Big East
- Record: 6–25 (2–16 Big East)
- Head coach: Kurt Godlevske (3rd season)
- Assistant coaches: Damon Bailey; Julie Shelton; Natalie Morse
- Home arena: Hinkle Fieldhouse

2016–17 Big East Conference women's basketball standings
	Conf.				Overall
Team	W		L	PCT	W		L	PCT
No. 19 DePaul*	16	–	2	.889	27	–	8	.771
Creighton	16	–	2	.889	24	–	8	.750
Marquette†	13	–	5	.722	25	–	8	.758
St. John's	11	–	7	.611	22	–	12	.647
Villanova	11	–	7	.611	20	–	14	.588
Georgetown	9	–	9	.500	17	–	13	.567
Providence	4	–	14	.222	12	–	18	.400
Xavier	4	–	14	.222	12	–	18	.400
Seton Hall	4	–	14	.222	12	–	19	.387
Butler	2	–	16	.111	6	–	25	.194
† 2017 Big East tournament winner * Tournament #1 seed As of March 29, 2017; Rankings from AP poll

The 2016–17 Butler Bulldogs women's basketball team represented Butler University in the 2016–17 NCAA Division I women's basketball season. The Bulldogs, led by third year head coach Kurt Godlevske, played their home games at Hinkle Fieldhouse and were members of the Big East Conference. They finished the season 6–25, 2–16 in Big East play to finish in last place. They advance to the quarterfinals of the Big East women's tournament where they lost to Creighton.

== Roster ==
2016–17 Butler Bulldogs women's basketball team
Players
Coaches

Pos.	#	Name	Height	Year	Previous school	Hometown
F	2	Kaela Hodges	6 ft 0 in (1.83 m)	Jr	Pontiac Township; Wabash Valley	Odell, IL
F	3	Brittany Ward	6 ft 1 in (1.85 m)	So	Pike	Indianapolis, IN
G	4	Taylor Buford	5 ft 11 in (1.8 m)	So	Adlai Stevenson	Long Grove, IL
G	11	Michelle Weaver	5 ft 7 in (1.7 m)	So	Saint Joseph	South Bend, IN
G	12	Sydney Buck	5 ft 7 in (1.7 m)	Jr	Homestead	Fort Wayne, IN
G	14	Sarah Humphrey	6 ft 0 in (1.83 m)	Fr	Crete-Monee	Crete, IL
G	15	Whitney Jennings (I) (redshirt)	5 ft 5 in (1.65 m)	Jr	Logansport; Iowa	Logansport, IN
G	22	Alexa Bailey	5 ft 7 in (1.7 m)	So	Bedford North Lawrence	Bedford, IN
G/F	23	Shae Brey	6 ft 0 in (1.83 m)	Fr	Eau Claire Regis	Altoona, WI
G	24	Kristen Spolyar	5 ft 10 in (1.78 m)	Fr	Lebanon	Lebanon, IN
G	30	Sydney Shelton	5 ft 9 in (1.75 m)	Fr	Mt. Vernon	Greenfield, IN
F	34	Tori Schickel	6 ft 1 in (1.85 m)	So	Mater Dei	Evansville, IN

Head coach

- Kurt Godlevske (Northern Michigan)

Assistant coach(es)

- Damon Bailey (Indiana)
- Julie Shelton (Butler)
- Natalie Morse (Hanover)

Legend

- (C) Team captain
- (S) Suspended
- (I) Ineligible
- (W) Walk-on
- Injured
- Current redshirt

Roster

== Schedule ==
Date time, TV	Rank^{#}	Opponent^{#}	Result	Record	Site (attendance) city, state
Exhibition
10/30/2016*; 1:00 pm		Hanover	W 91–39		Hinkle Fieldhouse; Indianapolis, IN
11/06/2016*; 1:00 pm		Southern Indiana	L 56–61		Hinkle Fieldhouse; Indianapolis, IN
Non-conference regular season
11/11/2016*; 7:00 pm		East Tennessee State	L 59–68	0–1	Hinkle Fieldhouse (544); Indianapolis, IN
11/13/2016*; 1:00 pm		Bradley	W 58–56	1–0	Hinkle Fieldhouse (389); Indianapolis, IN
11/16/2016*; 11:00 am		IPFW	W 70–64	2–1	Hinkle Fieldhouse (565); Indianapolis, IN
11/20/2016*; 2:00 pm		at Wisconsin	L 55–60	2–2	Kohl Center (3,458); Madison, WI
11/22/2016*; 7:00 pm		UCF	L 59–66	2–3	Hinkle Fieldhouse (345); Indianapolis, IN
11/30/2016*; 1:00 pm, FSN		at TCU	L 47–73	2–4	Schollmaier Arena (3,769); Fort Worth, TX
12/02/2016*; 7:00 pm		South Florida	L 59–74	2–5	Hinkle Fieldhouse (343); Indianapolis, IN
12/04/2016*; 1:00 pm		Ball State	L 50–74	2–6	Hinkle Fieldhouse (786); Indianapolis, IN
12/07/2016*; 8:00 pm		at Arkansas	L 50–68	2–7	Bud Walton Arena (1,017); Fayetteville, AR
12/11/2016*; 2:00 pm		Indiana State	W 66–48	3–7	Hinkle Fieldhouse (466); Indianapolis, IN
12/20/2016*; 7:00 pm		at Green Bay	L 34–61	3–8	Kress Events Center (1,967); Green Bay, WI
Big East Conference Play
12/28/2016; 5:00 pm, BEDN		at Creighton	L 52–67	3–9 (0–1)	D. J. Sokol Arena (981); Omaha, NE
12/30/2016; 12:00 pm, BEDN		at Providence	L 51–68	3–10 (0–2)	Alumni Hall (545); Providence, RI
01/02/2017; 12:00 pm, FS1		Seton Hall	W 79–58	4–10 (1–2)	Hinkle Fieldhouse (622); Indianapolis, IN
01/05/2017; 7:00 pm, BEDN		St. John's	L 41–62	4–11 (1–3)	Hinkle Fieldhouse (426); Indianapolis, IN
01/08/2017; 7:00 pm, BEDN		at Xavier	W 65–62 ^{OT}	5–11 (2–3)	Cintas Center (923); Cincinnati, OH
01/13/2017; 8:00 pm, BEDN		at No. 21 DePaul	L 69–100	5–12 (2–4)	McGrath-Phillips Arena (2,153); Chicago, IL
01/15/2017; 1:00 pm, FS1		at Marquette	L 53–91	5–13 (2–5)	Al McGuire Center (1,415); Milwaukee, WI
01/20/2017; 7:00 pm, BEDN		Villanova	L 69–70 ^{OT}	5–14 (2–6)	Hinkle Fieldhouse (603); Indianapolis, IN
01/22/2017; 1:00 pm, BEDN		Georgetown	L 52–58	5–15 (2–7)	Hinkle Fieldhouse (453); Indianapolis, IN
01/27/2017; 7:00 pm, BEDN		at St. John's	L 55–62	5–16 (2–8)	Carnesecca Arena (788); Queens, NY
01/29/2017; 2:00 pm, BEDN		at Seton Hall	L 63–65	5–17 (2–9)	Walsh Gymnasium (1,467); South Orange, NJ
02/04/2017; 1:00 pm, BEDN		at Xavier	L 43–53	5–18 (2–10)	Hinkle Fieldhouse (1,043); Indianapolis, IN
02/10/2017; 7:00 pm, BEDN		Marquette	L 66–72	5–19 (2–11)	Hinkle Fieldhouse (882); Indianapolis, IN
02/12/2017; 1:00 pm, BEDN		No. 18 DePaul	L 62–92	5–20 (2–12)	Hinkle Fieldhouse (587); Indianapolis, IN
02/17/2017; 7:00 pm, BEDN		at Georgetown	L 72–83	5–21 (2–13)	McDonough Gymnasium (511); Washington, D.C.
02/19/2017; 1:00 pm, BEDN		at Villanova	L 58–61 ^{OT}	5–22 (2–14)	The Pavilion (1,041); Villanova, PA
02/24/2017; 7:00 pm, BEDN		Providence	L 58–64	5–23 (2–15)	Hinkle Fieldhouse (486); Indianapolis, IN
02/26/2017; 1:00 pm, BEDN		Creighton	L 53–65	5–24 (2–16)	Hinkle Fieldhouse (759); Indianapolis, IN
Big East Women's Tournament
03/04/2017; 5:00 pm, BEDN		vs. Xavier; First Round	W 68–66	6–24	Al McGuire Center; Milwaukee, WI
03/05/2017; 1:00 pm, FS2		vs. Creighton; Quarterfinals	L 55–64	6–25	Al McGuire Center; Milwaukee, WI
*Non-conference game. ^{#}Rankings from AP Poll. (#) Tournament seedings in parentheses. All times are in Eastern BEDN=Big East Digital Network.

== See also ==
2016–17 Butler Bulldogs men's basketball team
