= 2016–17 Providence Friars women's basketball team =

Intercollegiate basketball season

2016–17 Providence Friars women's basketball
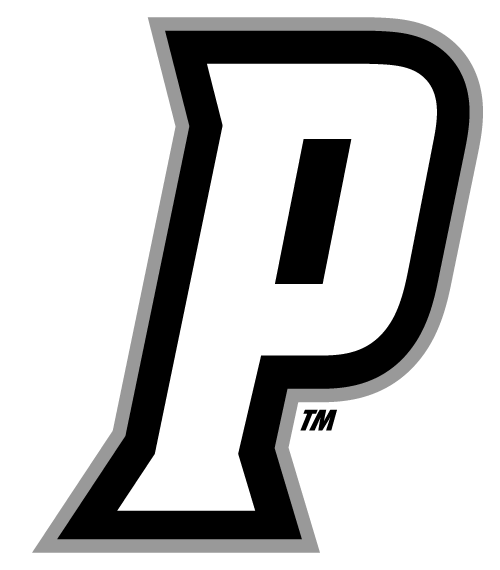
- Conference: Big East
- Record: 12–18 (4–14 Big East)
- Head coach: Jim Crowley (1st season)
- Assistant coaches: Priscilla Edwards; Tiara Johnson; Jessica Jenkins
- Home arena: Alumni Hall

2016–17 Big East Conference women's basketball standings
	Conf.				Overall
Team	W		L	PCT	W		L	PCT
No. 19 DePaul*	16	–	2	.889	27	–	8	.771
Creighton	16	–	2	.889	24	–	8	.750
Marquette†	13	–	5	.722	25	–	8	.758
St. John's	11	–	7	.611	22	–	12	.647
Villanova	11	–	7	.611	20	–	14	.588
Georgetown	9	–	9	.500	17	–	13	.567
Providence	4	–	14	.222	12	–	18	.400
Xavier	4	–	14	.222	12	–	18	.400
Seton Hall	4	–	14	.222	12	–	19	.387
Butler	2	–	16	.111	6	–	25	.194
† 2017 Big East tournament winner * Tournament #1 seed As of March 29, 2017; Rankings from AP poll

The 2016–17 Providence Friars women's basketball team represented Providence College in the 2016–17 NCAA Division I women's basketball season. The Friars, led by first year head coach Jim Crowley, played their home games at Alumni Hall and were members of the Big East Conference. They finished the season 12–18, 4–14 in Big East play to finish in a tie for seventh place. They lost in the first round of the Big East women's tournament to Seton Hall.

== Roster ==
2016–17 Providence Friars women's basketball team
Players
Coaches

Pos.	#	Name	Height	Year	Previous school	Hometown
G	0	Sarah Beal	5 ft 8 in (1.73 m)	Sr	New Hope Christian Academy	Matthews, NC
F	1	Alise Parker	6 ft 1 in (1.85 m)	Jr	Houston	Germantown, TN
F	3	Erica Meyer	6 ft 3 in (1.91 m)	So	Wilton	Wilton, CT
G	10	Allegra Botteghi	6 ft 0 in (1.83 m)	So	G. Parini	Bologna, Italy
G	11	Jovana 'Yoyo' Nogic	6 ft 1 in (1.85 m)	So	Vergilio Ferreira	Lisbon, Portugal
G	20	Ny'Dajah Jackson	5 ft 5 in (1.65 m)	Fr	Piedmont	Oakland, CA
G	21	Maddie Jolin	5 ft 9 in (1.75 m)	So	Bishop Feehan	Rehoboth, MA
F	22	Aliyah Miller	6 ft 1 in (1.85 m)	Sr	Southaven	Southaven, MS
G	23	Clara Che	5 ft 8 in (1.73 m)	So	Institut Joaquim Blume	Valencia, Spain
F	24	Rachel Aho	6 ft 3 in (1.91 m)	So	Marianapolis Prep	Holden, MA
F	25	Brianna Frias	6 ft 3 in (1.91 m)	Jr	Holy Name Central	Worcester, MA
F/C	31	Julia Thissell	6 ft 4 in (1.93 m)	Fr	The Rivers School	Hopkinton, MA
F	32	Maggie Ahearn	6 ft 2 in (1.88 m)	Fr	Tabor Academy	Marshfield, MA

Head coach

- Jim Crowley (Keuka)

Assistant coach(es)

- Priscilla Edwards (St. Bonaventure)
- Tiara Johnson (St. Bonaventure)
- Jessica Jenkins (St. Bonaventure)

Legend

- (C) Team captain
- (S) Suspended
- (I) Ineligible
- (W) Walk-on
- Injured
- Current redshirt

Roster

== Schedule ==
Date time, TV	Rank^{#}	Opponent^{#}	Result	Record	Site (attendance) city, state
Exhibition
11/05/2016*; 1:00 pm		Rhode Island College	W 64–29		Alumni Hall (312); Providence, RI
Non-conference regular season
11/11/2016*; 7:00 pm		Colgate	W 92–85 ^{2OT}	1–0	Alumni Hall (534); Providence, RI
11/16/2016*; 12:00 pm		North Dakota State	W 86–63	2–0	Alumni Hall (789); Providence, RI
11/19/2016*; 4:00 pm		Binghamton	W 71–58	3–0	Alumni Hall (634); Providence, RI
11/22/2016*; 7:00 pm		at Hartford	W 77–65	4–0	Chase Arena at Reich Family Pavilion (654); Hartford, CT
11/26/2016*; 2:00 pm		at UNC Wilmington; UNCW Hampton Inn Thanksgiving Classic	W 65–49	5–0	Trask Coliseum (428); Wilmington, NC
11/27/2016*; 12:00 pm		vs. Miami (OH); UNCW Hampton Inn Thanksgiving Classic	W 75–59	6–0	Trask Coliseum; Wilmington, NC
12/03/2016*; 1:00 pm		vs. Bryant; Ocean State Tip-Off Tournament semifinals	W 65–49	7–0	Pizzitola Sports Center (428); Providence, RI
12/04/2016*; 3:00 pm		at Brown; Ocean State Tip-Off Tournament championship	L 70–77	7–1	Pizzitola Sports Center (431); Providence, RI
12/07/2016*; 7:00 pm		at Columbia	L 64–66 ^{OT}	7–2	Levien Gymnasium (286); New York City, NY
12/10/2016*; 7:00 pm		at Boston College	L 53–57	7–3	Conte Forum (905); Chestnut Hill, MA
12/21/2016*; 7:00 pm		at Monmouth	W 62–58	8–3	OceanFirst Bank Center (312); West Long Branch, NJ
Big East regular season
12/28/2016; 7:00 pm, BEDN		Xavier	L 51–54	8–4 (0–1)	Alumni Hall (477); Providence, RI
12/30/2016; 12:00 pm, BEDN		Butler	W 68–51	9–4 (1–1)	Alumni Hall (545); Providence, RI
01/02/2017; 9:00 pm, CBSSN		at DePaul	L 56–61	9–5 (1–2)	McGrath-Phillips Arena (1,977); Chicago, IL
01/04/2017; 8:00 pm, BEDN		at Marquette	L 74–79	9–6 (1–3)	Al McGuire Center (1,041); Milwaukee, WI
01/08/2017; 2:00 pm, FS1		Villanova	L 59–64	9–7 (1–4)	Alumni Hall (564); Providence, RI
01/10/2017; 7:00 pm, BEDN		Georgetown	L 39–71	9–8 (1–5)	Alumni Hall (380); Providence, RI
01/14/2017; 12:00 pm, BEDN		Creighton	L 51–58	9–9 (1–6)	Alumni Hall (384); Providence, RI
01/20/2017; 7:00 pm, FS2		at Seton Hall	L 43–55	9–10 (1–7)	Walsh Gymnasium (657); South Orange, NJ
01/22/2017; 2:00 pm, BEDN		at St. John's	L 50–60	9–11 (1–8)	Carnesecca Arena (646); Queens, NY
01/27/2017; 7:00 pm, BEDN		Marquette	W 66–64	10–11 (2–8)	Alumni Hall (520); Providence, RI
01/29/2017; 12:00 pm, BEDN		No. 21 DePaul	L 55–64	10–12 (2–9)	Alumni Hall (578); Providence, RI
02/03/2017; 12:00 pm, BEDN		at Georgetown	L 70–72 ^{OT}	10–13 (2–10)	McDonough Gymnasium (2,117); Washington, D.C.
02/05/2017; 1:00 pm, BEDN		at Villanova	L 43–61	10–14 (2–11)	The Pavilion (1,309); Villanova, PA
02/11/2017; 2:05 pm, BEDN		at Creighton	L 57–88	10–15 (2–12)	D. J. Sokol Arena (1,240); Omaha, NE
02/17/2017; 7:00 pm, BEDN		St. John's	L 47–71	10–16 (2–13)	Alumni Hall (589); Providence, RI
02/19/2017; 12:00 pm, BEDN		Seton Hall	W 74–57	11–16 (3–13)	Alumni Hall (837); Providence, RI
02/24/2017; 7:00 pm, BEDN		at Butler	W 64–58	12–16 (4–13)	Hinkle Fieldhouse (486); Indianapolis, IN
02/26/2017; 11:30 am, BEDN		at Xavier	L 57–67	12–17 (4–14)	Cintas Center (938); Cincinnati, OH
Big East Women's Tournament
03/04/2017; 7:30 pm, BEDN		vs. Seton Hall; First Round	L 60–92	12–18	Al McGuire Center (2,132); Milwaukee, WI
*Non-conference game. ^{#}Rankings from AP Poll. (#) Tournament seedings in parentheses. All times are in Eastern.

== See also ==
- 2016–17 Providence Friars men's basketball team
