= 2016–17 Seton Hall Pirates women's basketball team =

Intercollegiate basketball season

2016–17 Seton Hall Pirates women's basketball
- Conference: Big East Conference
- Record: 12–19 (4–14 Big East)
- Head coach: Anthony Bozzella (4th season)
- Assistant coaches: Lauren DeFalco; Tiffany Jones-Smart; Marissa Flagg
- Home arena: Walsh Gymnasium

2016–17 Big East Conference women's basketball standings
	Conf.				Overall
Team	W		L	PCT	W		L	PCT
No. 19 DePaul*	16	–	2	.889	27	–	8	.771
Creighton	16	–	2	.889	24	–	8	.750
Marquette†	13	–	5	.722	25	–	8	.758
St. John's	11	–	7	.611	22	–	12	.647
Villanova	11	–	7	.611	20	–	14	.588
Georgetown	9	–	9	.500	17	–	13	.567
Providence	4	–	14	.222	12	–	18	.400
Xavier	4	–	14	.222	12	–	18	.400
Seton Hall	4	–	14	.222	12	–	19	.387
Butler	2	–	16	.111	6	–	25	.194
† 2017 Big East tournament winner * Tournament #1 seed As of March 29, 2017; Rankings from AP poll

The 2016–17 Seton Hall Pirates women's basketball team represented Seton Hall University during the 2016–17 NCAA Division I women's basketball season. The Pirates, led by fourth head coach Anthony Bozzella, played their home games in South Orange, New Jersey at the Walsh Gymnasium and were members of the Big East Conference. They finished the season 12–19, 4–14 in Big East play to finish in a tie for seventh place. They advanced to the quarterfinals of the Big East women's tournament where they lost to DePaul.

== Roster ==
2016–17 Seton Hall Pirates women's basketball team
Players
Coaches

Pos.	#	Name	Height	Year	Hometown
G	0	JaQuan Jackson	5 ft 8 in (1.73 m)	RS Jr	Killeen, TX
G	1	Kaela Hilaire	5 ft 5 in (1.65 m)	Fr	Floral Park, NY
G	2	Tyeisha Smith	5 ft 8 in (1.73 m)	Fr	Baltimore, MD
G	3	LaTecia Smith	5 ft 6 in (1.68 m)	So	Gardenia, CA
G	4	Kaity Healy	5 ft 6 in (1.68 m)	So	Colts Neck, NJ
G/F	5	Martha Kuderer	5 ft 11 in (1.8 m)	So	Eden Prairie, MN
G	10	Ali Fitzgerald	5 ft 8 in (1.73 m)	Fr	Fairport, NY
G/F	15	Deja Winters	5 ft 11 in (1.8 m)	Fr	Richmond Heights, OH
F	20	Skyler Snider	5 ft 10 in (1.78 m)	Fr	Kearney, NE
G/F	21	Kathleen Egan	5 ft 10 in (1.78 m)	RS Jr	Aberdeen, NJ
G	23	Tara Inman	5 ft 9 in (1.75 m)	Sr	Holmdal, NJ
G/F	24	Shadeen Samuels	6 ft 0 in (1.83 m)	Fr	Ossining, NY
C	25	Jordan Molyneaux	6 ft 2 in (1.88 m)	RS So	Denver, CO
G/F	30	Claire Lundberg	6 ft 1 in (1.85 m)	So	Andover, MN
F/C	31	Jayla Jones-Pack	6 ft 4 in (1.93 m)	Fr	Amityville, NY
C	35	Lubirdia Gordon	6 ft 4 in (1.93 m)	Sr	Mount Vernon, NY
F		Taylor Brown (I) (redshirt)	6 ft 0 in (1.83 m)	So	Paterson, NJ

Head coach

- Anthony Bozzella (Seton Hall)

Assistant coach(es)

- Lauren DeFalco (Iona)
- Tiffany Jones-Smart (Saint Peter's)
- Marissa Flagg (Iona)

Legend

- (C) Team captain
- (S) Suspended
- (I) Ineligible
- (W) Walk-on
- Injured
- Current redshirt

Roster

== Schedule ==
Date time, TV	Rank^{#}	Opponent^{#}	Result	Record	Site (attendance) city, state
Exhibition
11/05/2016*; 12:00 pm		Philadelphia	W 80–54		Walsh Gymnasium; South Orange, NJ
Non-conference regular season
11/11/2016*; 11:00 am, PSN		Savannah State	W 74–60	1–0	Walsh Gymnasium (699); South Orange, NJ
11/15/2016*; 7:00 pm		at Marist	W 76–63	2–0	McCann Field House (1,463); Poughkeepsie, NY
11/17/2016*; 7:00 pm, PSN		Boston College	W 71–67	3–0	Walsh Gymnasium (1,451); South Orange, NJ
11/20/2016*; 3:00 pm		at Minnesota	L 57–90	3–1	Williams Arena (3,022); Minneapolis, MN
11/26/2016*; 2:30 pm, PSN		Central Connecticut State; SHU Thanksgiving Classic semifinals	W 78–70 ^{OT}	4–1	Walsh Gymnasium (748); South Orange, NJ
11/27/2016*; 2:30 pm, PSN		Texas–Arlington; SHU Thanksgiving Classic championship	L 61–86	4–2	Walsh Gymnasium (672); South Orange, NJ
11/30/2016*; 6:00 pm		at Princeton	L 67–94	4–3	Jadwin Gymnasium (656); Princeton, NJ
12/04/2016*; 2:00 pm, PSN		Wake Forest	W 70–63	5–3	Walsh Gymnasium (657); South Orange, NJ
12/07/2016*; 11:30 am, PSN		LIU Brooklyn	W 77–59	6–3	Walsh Gymnasium (1,265); South Orange, NJ
12/13/2016*; 7:00 pm, BTN		at Rutgers	L 45–53	6–4	Louis Brown Athletic Center (1,626); Piscataway, NJ
12/18/2016*; 12:00 pm, PSN		Rider	W 89–81	7–4	Walsh Gymnasium (620); South Orange, NJ
Big East regular season
12/30/2016; 7:00 pm, FS2		St. John's	W 64–59	8–4 (1–0)	Walsh Gymnasium (1,327); South Orange, NJ
01/02/2017; 6:30 pm, FS1		Butler	L 58–79	8–5 (1–1)	Hinkle Fieldhouse (622); Indianapolis, IN
01/04/2017; 7:00 pm, BEDN		at Xavier	L 64–72	8–6 (1–2)	Cintas Center (620); Cincinnati, OH
01/08/2017; 7:00 pm, BEDN		No. 23 DePaul	L 65–96	8–7 (1–3)	Walsh Gymnasium (850); South Orange, NJ
01/10/2017; 7:00 pm, BEDN		Marquette	L 77–83	8–8 (1–4)	Walsh Gymnasium (744); South Orange, NJ
01/13/2017; 11:30 am, BEDN		at Villanova	L 52–69	8–9 (1–5)	The Pavilion (2,109); Villanova, PA
01/15/2017; 2:00 pm, BEDN		at Georgetown	L 58–77	8–10 (1–6)	McDonough Gymnasium (977); Washington, D.C.
01/20/2017; 7:00 pm, FS2		Providence	W 55–43	9–10 (2–6)	Walsh Gymnasium (657); South Orange, NJ
01/20/2017; 11:00 am, FS2		Creighton	L 60–70 ^{OT}	9–11 (2–7)	Walsh Gymnasium (618); South Orange, NJ
01/27/2017; 7:00 pm, BEDN		Xavier	W 71–62	10–11 (3–7)	Walsh Gymnasium (783); South Orange, NJ
01/29/2017; 2:00 pm, BEDN		Butler	W 65–63	11–11 (4–7)	Walsh Gymnasium (1,467); South Orange, NJ
02/03/2017; 12:30 pm, BEDN		at Marquette	L 60–103	11–12 (4–8)	Al McGuire Center (2,524); Milwaukee, WI
02/05/2017; 3:00 pm, BEDN		at No. 17 DePaul	L 60–86	11–13 (4–9)	McGrath-Phillips Arena (2,006); Chicago, IL
02/10/2017; 7:00 pm, BEDN		Georgetown	L 60–77	11–14 (4–10)	Walsh Gymnasium (1,010); South Orange, NJ
02/12/2017; 2:00 pm, BEDN		Villanova	L 52–87	11–15 (4–11)	Walsh Gymnasium (1,087); South Orange, NJ
02/17/2017; 8:00 pm, BEDN		at Creighton	L 44–61	11–16 (4–12)	D. J. Sokol Arena (1,140); Omaha, NE
02/19/2017; 12:00 pm, BEDN		at Providence	L 57–74	11–17 (4–13)	Alumni Hall (837); Providence, RI
02/26/2017; 2:00 pm, BEDN		at St. John's	L 71–77	11–18 (4–14)	Carnesecca Arena (1,121); Queens, NY
Big East Women's Tournament
03/04/2017; 7:30 pm, BEDN		vs. Providence; First Round	W 73–60	12–18	Al McGuire Center (2,132); Milwaukee, WI
03/05/2017; 7:00 pm, FS2		vs. DePaul; Quarterfinals	L 60–92	12–19	Al McGuire Center; Milwaukee, WI
*Non-conference game. ^{#}Rankings from AP Poll. (#) Tournament seedings in parentheses. B=Bridgeport Region. All times are in Eastern Time.

== See also ==
- 2016–17 Seton Hall Pirates men's basketball team
