= 2016–17 Georgetown Hoyas women's basketball team =

Intercollegiate basketball season

2016–17 Georgetown Hoyas women's basketball

WNIT, First Round
- Conference: Big East
- Record: 17–13 (9–9 Big East)
- Head coach: Natasha Adair (3rd season)
- Assistant coaches: James Howard; Melba Chambers; Sarah Jenkins
- Home arena: McDonough Gymnasium

2016–17 Big East Conference women's basketball standings
	Conf.				Overall
Team	W		L	PCT	W		L	PCT
No. 19 DePaul*	16	–	2	.889	27	–	8	.771
Creighton	16	–	2	.889	24	–	8	.750
Marquette†	13	–	5	.722	25	–	8	.758
St. John's	11	–	7	.611	22	–	12	.647
Villanova	11	–	7	.611	20	–	14	.588
Georgetown	9	–	9	.500	17	–	13	.567
Providence	4	–	14	.222	12	–	18	.400
Xavier	4	–	14	.222	12	–	18	.400
Seton Hall	4	–	14	.222	12	–	19	.387
Butler	2	–	16	.111	6	–	25	.194
† 2017 Big East tournament winner * Tournament #1 seed As of March 29, 2017; Rankings from AP poll

The 2016–17 Georgetown Hoyas women's basketball team represented Georgetown University in the 2016–17 college basketball season. The Hoyas, led by third year head coach Natasha Adair, were members of the Big East Conference, and played their home games at the McDonough Gymnasium. They finished the season 17–13, 9–9 in Big East play to finish in sixth place. They lost in the quarterfinals of the Big East women's tournament to Marquette. They were invited to the WNIT where they lost to Fordham in the first round.

== Roster ==
2016–17 Georgetown Hoyas women's basketball team
Players
Coaches

Pos.	#	Name	Height	Year	Previous school	Hometown
G	2	Didi Burton	5 ft 5 in (1.65 m)	Jr	Baltimore City College	Baltimore, MD
G	3	Tyshell King	5 ft 11 in (1.8 m)	Sr	St. Frances Academy	Baltimore, MD
G	4	Mykia Jones	5 ft 8 in (1.73 m)	RS Jr	Millbrook; Wake Forest	Raleigh, NC
G	11	Dionna White	5 ft 5 in (1.65 m)	So	Milford Mill	Baltimore, MD
G	12	Marvellous Osagie-Erese	5 ft 4 in (1.63 m)	Fr	East Orange STEM Academy	East Orange, NJ
G	13	Jade Martin	5 ft 11 in (1.8 m)	Sr	John F. Kennedy	Bloomington, MN
G	15	Mikayla Venson (I) (redshirt)	5 ft 7 in (1.7 m)	Jr	Yorktown; Virginia	Arlington, VA
F	24	Faith Woodard	6 ft 2 in (1.88 m)	Sr	Freedom	Brandon, FL
C	32	Yazmine Belk	6 ft 3 in (1.91 m)	Jr	Nazareth Regional	Queens, NY
G	33	Morgan Smith	6 ft 0 in (1.83 m)	Fr	Riverdale Baptist	Upper Marlboro, MD
G	34	Dorothy Adomako	6 ft 1 in (1.85 m)	Jr	Cosby	Midlothian, VA
C	42	Olivia Ramil	6 ft 2 in (1.88 m)	Fr	Binghamton	Binghamton, NY
C	44	Jodi-Marie Ramil	6 ft 2 in (1.88 m)	So	Binghamton	Binghamton, NY

Head coach

- Natasha Adair (South Florida)

Assistant coach(es)

- James Howard (Greensboro)
- Melba Chambers (Georgetown)
- Sarah Jenkins (Georgetown)

Legend

- (C) Team captain
- (S) Suspended
- (I) Ineligible
- (W) Walk-on
- Injured
- Current redshirt

Roster

== Schedule ==
Date time, TV	Rank^{#}	Opponent^{#}	Result	Record	Site (attendance) city, state
Non-conference regular season
11/11/2016*; 7:00 pm		George Washington	W 72–57	1–0	McDonough Gymnasium (1,413); Washington, D.C.
11/13/2016*; 4:00 pm		at Virginia Tech	L 63–73	1–1	Cassell Coliseum (2,285); Blacksburg, VA
11/18/2016*; 5:00 pm		at Minnesota	L 60–68	1–2	Williams Arena (3,011); Minneapolis, MN
11/22/2016*; 7:00 pm		at FIU	W 66–53	2–2	FIU Arena (436); Boca Raton, FL
11/24/2016*; 11:00 am		vs. Wright State; San Juan Shootout	W 67–60	3–2	Ocean Center; Daytona Beach, FL
11/25/2016*; 1:15 pm		vs. Penn State; San Juan Shootout	W 68–54	4–2	Ocean Center; Daytona Beach, FL
11/30/2016*; 12:00 pm		at Towson	W 75–59	5–2	SECU Arena (1,357); Towson, MD
12/04/2016*; 2:00 pm		at Delaware	W 54–46	6–2	Bob Carpenter Center (1,368); Newark, DE
12/08/2016*; 7:00 pm		George Mason	W 69–56	7–2	McDonough Gymnasium (673); Washington, D.C.
12/11/2016*; 2:00 pm		Alabama	W 70–59	8–2	McDonough Gymnasium (819); Washington, D.C.
Non-conference regular season
12/28/2016; 2:00 pm, BEDN		DePaul	L 53–76	8–3 (0–1)	McDonough Gymnasium (421); Washington, D.C.
12/30/2016; 2:00 pm, MASN2		Marquette	L 77–84	8–4 (0–2)	McDonough Gymnasium (319); Washington, D.C.
01/04/2017; 7:00 pm, BEDN		at Villanova	L 50–71	8–5 (0–3)	The Pavilion (435); Villanova, PA
01/08/2017; 2:05 pm, BEDN		at Creighton	L 68–70 ^{OT}	8–6 (0–4)	D. J. Sokol Arena (872); Omaha, NE
01/10/2017; 7:00 pm, BEDN		at Providence	W 71–39	9–6 (1–4)	Alumni Hall (380); Providence, RI
01/13/2017; 7:00 pm, FS1		St. John's	L 66–71	9–7 (1–5)	McDonough Gymnasium (709); Washington, D.C.
01/15/2017; 2:00 pm, BEDN		Seton Hall	W 77–58	10–7 (2–5)	McDonough Gymnasium (977); Washington, D.C.
01/20/2017; 8:00 pm, FS1		at Xavier	W 69–64 ^{OT}	11–7 (3–5)	Cintas Center (1,730); Cincinnati, OH
01/22/2017; 1:00 pm, BEDN		at Butler	W 58–52	12–7 (4–5)	Hinkle Fieldhouse (453); Indianapolis, IN
01/28/2017; 1:00 pm, BEDN		Villanova	W 54–49	13–7 (5–5)	McDonough Gymnasium (1,311); Washington, D.C.
02/03/2017; 12:00 pm, BEDN		Providence	W 72–70 ^{OT}	14–7 (6–5)	McDonough Gymnasium (2,117); Washington, D.C.
02/05/2017; 1:00 pm, BEDN		Creighton	L 59–67	14–8 (6–6)	McDonough Gymnasium (691); Washington, D.C.
02/10/2017; 7:00 pm, BEDN		at Seton Hall	W 77–60	15–8 (7–6)	Walsh Gymnasium (1,010); South Orange, NJ
02/12/2017; 2:00 pm, BEDN		at St. John's	L 54–65	15–9 (7–7)	Carnesecca Arena (721); Queens, NY
02/17/2017; 7:00 pm, MASN2		Butler	W 83–72	16–9 (8–7)	McDonough Gymnasium (511); Washington, D.C.
02/19/2017; 2:00 pm, BEDN		Xavier	W 81–63	17–9 (9–7)	McDonough Gymnasium (891); Washington, D.C.
02/24/2017; 8:00 pm, BEDN		at Marquette	L 70–80	17–10 (9–8)	Al McGuire Center (1,156); Milwaukee, WI
02/26/2017; 1:00 pm, FS1		at No. 19 DePaul	L 70–79	17–11 (9–9)	McGrath-Phillips Arena (2,553); Chicago, IL
Big East Women's Tournament
03/05/2017; 3:30 pm, FS2		vs. Marquette; Quarterfinals	L 66–80	17–12	Al McGuire Center (2,815); Milwaukee, WI
WNIT
03/17/2017*; 7:00 pm		Fordham; First Round	L 49–60	17–13	McDonough Gymnasium (278); Washington, D.C.
*Non-conference game. ^{#}Rankings from AP Poll. (#) Tournament seedings in parentheses. All times are in Eastern.

== Rankings ==
2016–17 NCAA Division I women's basketball rankings

+ Regular season polls	Poll	Pre- Season	Week 2	Week 3	Week 4	Week 5	Week 6	Week 7	Week 8	Week 9	Week 10	Week 11	Week 12	Week 13	Week 14	Week 15	Week 16	Week 17	Week 18	Week 19	Final
AP	NR	NR	NR	NR	NR	NR	NR	RV												N/A	
Coaches	NR	NR	NR	NR	NR	NR	NR	NR													

Legend
	Increase in ranking
	Decrease in ranking
	Not ranked previous week
(RV)	Received Votes

== See also ==
2016–17 Georgetown Hoyas men's basketball team
