= 2016–17 DePaul Blue Demons women's basketball team =

Intercollegiate basketball season

2016–17 DePaul Blue Demons women's basketball
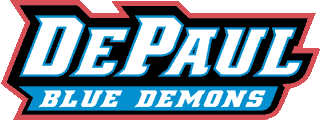

Maggie Dixon Classic champions Big East regular season co-champions

NCAA Women's Tournament, second round
- Conference: Big East Conference

Ranking
- Coaches: No. 18
- AP: No. 19
- Record: 27–8 (16–2 Big East)
- Head coach: Doug Bruno (31st season)
- Assistant coaches: Jill M. Pizzotti; Candis Blankson; Bart Brooks
- Home arena: McGrath-Phillips Arena

2016–17 Big East Conference women's basketball standings
	Conf.				Overall
Team	W		L	PCT	W		L	PCT
No. 19 DePaul*	16	–	2	.889	27	–	8	.771
Creighton	16	–	2	.889	24	–	8	.750
Marquette†	13	–	5	.722	25	–	8	.758
St. John's	11	–	7	.611	22	–	12	.647
Villanova	11	–	7	.611	20	–	14	.588
Georgetown	9	–	9	.500	17	–	13	.567
Providence	4	–	14	.222	12	–	18	.400
Xavier	4	–	14	.222	12	–	18	.400
Seton Hall	4	–	14	.222	12	–	19	.387
Butler	2	–	16	.111	6	–	25	.194
† 2017 Big East tournament winner * Tournament #1 seed As of March 29, 2017; Rankings from AP poll

The 2016–17 DePaul Blue Demons women's basketball team represented DePaul University during the 2016–17 NCAA Division I women's basketball season. The Blue Demons, led by 31st year head coach Doug Bruno, played their home games at the McGrath–Phillips Arena as members of the Big East Conference. They finished the season 27–8, 16–2 in Big East play to win the Big East regular season title. They advanced to the championship game of the Big East women's tournament where they lost to Marquette. They received an at-large bid to the NCAA women's tournament where they defeated Northern Iowa in the first round before losing to Mississippi State in the second round.

This was expected to be the Blue Demons' final season at McGrath–Phillips Arena. DePaul plans to move the women's team off campus, though still within its home city of Chicago, into the new Wintrust Arena, currently under construction at the McCormick Place convention center. The arena will also become home to the DePaul men's team.

In the February 3 game against St. John's, senior guard Brooke Schulte scored her 1,000th career point.

== Previous season ==
The Blue Devils finished the 2015–16 season 27–9, 16–2 in Big East play to win the Big East regular season title. They advanced to the semifinals of the Big East women's tournament where they lost to St. John's. They received an at-large bid to the NCAA women's basketball tournament, where they defeated James Madison in the first round, Louisville in the second round before losing to Oregon State in the sweet sixteen.

== Roster ==
2016–17 DePaul Blue Demons women's basketball team
Players
Coaches

Pos.	#	Name	Height	Year	Previous school	Hometown
G	1	Ashton Millender	5 ft 8 in (1.73 m)	Jr	Marian Catholic	Glenwood, IL
G	3	Micaela Kelly	5 ft 6 in (1.68 m)	Fr	Martin Luther King Jr.	Detroit, MI
F	4	Meri Bennett-Swanson	6 ft 3 in (1.91 m)	RS Jr	Vernon Hills	Vernon Hills, IL
G	5	Lauren Prochaska	5 ft 8 in (1.73 m)	Jr	Trinity	Chicago, IL
G	10	Amarah Coleman	5 ft 11 in (1.8 m)	Jr	Homewood-Flossmoor	Bolingbrook, IL
G	14	Jessica January	5 ft 7 in (1.7 m)	Sr	Richfield	Richfield, MN
G	20	Kelly Campbell	5 ft 10 in (1.78 m)	Fr	Saint John Vianney	Wall, NJ
F	21	Chante Stonewall	6 ft 1 in (1.85 m)	Fr	University	Normal, IL
G	22	Brooke Schulte	5 ft 9 in (1.75 m)	Sr	Mater Dei	Germantown, IL
G	24	Tanita Allen	5 ft 10 in (1.78 m)	So	Whitney Young	Chicago, IL
F	33	Claire McMahon	6 ft 1 in (1.85 m)	Fr	Lincoln Way East	Frankfort, IL
F	34	Jacqui Grant	6 ft 3 in (1.91 m)	Sr	Maine South	Park Ridge, IL
F	35	Mart'e Grays	6 ft 2 in (1.88 m)	Jr	Martin Luther King Jr.	Detroit, MI
G	45	Meghan Waldron	5 ft 11 in (1.8 m)	RS So	Wheaton Warrenville South	Wheaton, IL

Head coach

- Doug Bruno (DePaul)

Assistant coach(es)

- Jill M. Pizzotti (Southeast Missouri State)
- Candis Blankson (DePaul)
- Bart Brooks (Dickinson State)

Legend

- (C) Team captain
- (S) Suspended
- (I) Ineligible
- (W) Walk-on
- Injured
- Current redshirt

Roster

== Schedule ==
Date time, TV	Rank^{#}	Opponent^{#}	Result	Record	Site (attendance) city, state
Exhibition
11/01/2016*; 7:00 pm	No. 21	Saint Xavier	W 124–67		McGrath-Phillips Arena; Chicago, IL
11/04/2016*; 6:00 pm	No. 21	St. Francis (IL)	W 126–56		McGrath-Phillips Arena; Chicago, IL
Non-conference regular season
11/11/2016*; 8:00 pm	No. 21	Appalachian State; Maggie Dixon Classic semifinals	W 99–58	1–0	McGrath-Phillips Arena (2,055); Chicago, IL
11/12/2016*; 8:00 pm	No. 21	UAB; Maggie Dixon Classic championship	W 90–80	2–0	McGrath-Phillips Arena (2,055); Chicago, IL
11/19/2016*; 7:00 pm	No. 20	Northwestern	W 89–66	3–0	McGrath-Phillips Arena (2,342); Chicago, IL
11/25/2016*; 12:30 pm	No. 18	vs. WKU; Gulf Coast Showcase quarterfinals	W 77–69	4–0	Germain Arena; Estero, FL
11/26/2016*; 4:00 pm	No. 18	vs. No. 5 Baylor; Gulf Coast Showcase semifinals	L 72–104	4–1	Germain Arena; Estero, FL
11/27/2016*; 4:00 pm	No. 18	vs. No. 11 Syracuse; Gulf Coast Showcase 3rd place game	W 108–84	5–1	Germain Arena; Estero, FL
12/01/2016*; 6:00 pm, CSNC+/ESPN3	No. 15	at No. 2 Connecticut	L 46–91	5–2	Gampel Pavilion (6,716); Storrs, CT
12/05/2016*; 12:00 pm	No. 16	Prairie View A&M	W 94–62	6–2	McGrath-Phillips Arena (3,001); Chicago, IL
12/10/2016*; 7:00 pm, CSNC+	No. 16	No. 2 Notre Dame	L 61–75	6–3	McGrath-Phillips Arena (3,001); Chicago, IL
12/15/2016*; 8:00 pm, ESPNU	No. 17	at Temple	L 74–84	6–4	McGonigle Hall (721); Philadelphia, PA
12/18/2016*; 2:00 pm, ESPN3	No. 17	at Loyola–Chicago	W 107–46	7–4	Joseph J. Gentile Arena (321); Chicago, IL
12/20/2016*; 8:00 pm		UT Martin	W 100–68	8–4	McGrath-Phillips Arena (2,122); Chicago, IL
Conference regular season
12/28/2016; 1:00 pm, BEDN		at Georgetown	W 76–53	9–4 (1–0)	McDonough Gymnasium (421); Washington, D.C.
12/30/2016; 1:00 pm, BEDN		at Villanova	W 80–50	10–4 (2–0)	The Pavilion (635); Villanova, PA
01/02/2017; 1:00 pm, CBSSN	No. 23	Providence	W 61–56	11–4 (2–0)	McGrath-Phillips Arena (1,977); Chicago, IL
01/04/2017; 7:00 pm, BEDN	No. 23	Creighton	W 79–65	12–4 (4–0)	McGrath-Phillips Arena (2,082); Chicago, IL
01/08/2017; 1:00 pm, BEDN	No. 23	at Seton Hall	W 96–65	13–4 (5–0)	Walsh Gymnasium (850); South Orange, NJ
01/10/2017; 6:00 pm, BEDN	No. 21	at St. John's	W 78–66	14–4 (6–0)	Carnesecca Arena (565); Queens, NY
01/13/2017; 7:00 pm, BEDN/CSNC+	No. 21	Butler	W 100–69	15–4 (7–0)	McGrath-Phillips Arena (2,153); Chicago, IL
01/15/2017; 2:00 pm, BEDN	No. 21	Xavier	W 85–69	16–4 (8–0)	McGrath-Phillips Arena (2,311); Chicago, IL
01/21/2017; 7:00 pm, BEDN/CSNC+	No. 19	Marquette	L 101–102 ^{OT}	16–5 (8–1)	McGrath-Phillips Arena (2,481); Chicago, IL
01/27/2017; 7:00 pm, FS1	No. 21	at Creighton	W 60–56	17–5 (9–1)	D. J. Sokol Arena (1,313); Omaha, NE
01/29/2017; 11:00 am, BEDN	No. 21	at Providence	W 64–55	18–5 (10–1)	Alumni Hall (578); Providence, RI
02/03/2017; 7:00 pm, BEDN/CSNC+	No. 17	St. John's	W 54–51	19–5 (11–1)	McGrath-Phillips Arena (2,312); Chicago, IL
02/05/2017; 2:00 pm, BEDN/CSNC	No. 17	Seton Hall	W 86–60	20–5 (12–1)	McGrath-Phillips Arena (2,006); Chicago, IL
02/10/2017; 6:00 pm, BEDN/CSNC	No. 18	at Xavier	W 70–43	21–5 (13–1)	Cintas Center (2,770); Cincinnati, OH
02/12/2017; 12:00 pm, BEDN	No. 18	at Butler	W 92–62	22–5 (14–1)	Hinkle Fieldhouse (587); Indianapolis, IN
02/19/2017; 1:00 pm, FS2	No. 17	at Marquette	L 81–96	22–6 (14–2)	Al McGuire Center (1,733); Milwaukee, WI
02/24/2017; 7:00 pm, BEDN	No. 19	Villanova	W 77–50	23–6 (15–2)	McGrath-Phillips Arena (2,368); Chicago, IL
02/26/2016; 12:00 pm, FS1	No. 19	Georgetown	W 79–70	24–6 (16–2)	McGrath-Phillips Arena (2,553); Chicago, IL
Big East Women's Tournament
03/05/2017; 6:00 pm, FS2	(1) No. 18	vs. (8) Seton Hall; Quarterfinals	W 92–60	25–6	Al McGuire Center; Milwaukee, WI
03/06/2017; 5:30 pm, FS1	(1) No. 17	vs. (5) St. John's; Semifinals	W 59–45	26–6	Al McGuire Center (2,511); Milwaukee, WI
03/07/2017; 8:00 pm, FS1	(1) No. 17	vs. (3) Marquette; Championship Game	L 78–86	26–7	Al McGuire Center (3,166); Milwaukee, WI
NCAA Women's Tournament
03/17/2017*; 11:00 am, ESPN2	(7 O) No. 19	vs. (10 O) Northern Iowa; First Round	W 88–67	27–7	Humphrey Coliseum; Starkville, MS
03/19/2017*; 1:30 pm, ESPN2	(7 O) No. 19	at (2 O) No. 7 Mississippi State; Second Round	L 71–92	27–8	Humphrey Coliseum (6,035); Starkville, MS
*Non-conference game. ^{#}Rankings from AP Poll. (#) Tournament seedings in parentheses. O=Oklahoma City Region. All times are in Central Time.

== Rankings ==
Regular season polls
Poll	Pre- Season	Week 2	Week 3	Week 4	Week 5	Week 6	Week 7	Week 8	Week 9	Week 10	Week 11	Week 12	Week 13	Week 14	Week 15	Week 16	Week 17	Week 18	Week 19	Final
AP	21	20	18	15	16	17	RV	RV	23	21	19	21	17	18	17	19	18	17	19	N/A
Coaches	21	20	17	14	15	16	22	22	21	20	18	19	17	16	15	18	17	17	19	18

Legend
	Increase in ranking
	Decrease in ranking
	Not ranked previous week
(RV)	Received Votes
