= 2016–17 Creighton Bluejays women's basketball team =

Intercollegiate basketball season

2016–17 Creighton Bluejays women's basketball

Big East regular season co-champions

NCAA Women's Tournament, second round
- Conference: Big East
- Record: 24–8 (16–2 Big East)
- Head coach: Jim Flanery (14th season)
- Assistant coaches: Matt Fritsche; Chevelle Herring; Linda Sayavongchanh
- Home arena: D. J. Sokol Arena

2016–17 Big East Conference women's basketball standings
	Conf.				Overall
Team	W		L	PCT	W		L	PCT
No. 19 DePaul*	16	–	2	.889	27	–	8	.771
Creighton	16	–	2	.889	24	–	8	.750
Marquette†	13	–	5	.722	25	–	8	.758
St. John's	11	–	7	.611	22	–	12	.647
Villanova	11	–	7	.611	20	–	14	.588
Georgetown	9	–	9	.500	17	–	13	.567
Providence	4	–	14	.222	12	–	18	.400
Xavier	4	–	14	.222	12	–	18	.400
Seton Hall	4	–	14	.222	12	–	19	.387
Butler	2	–	16	.111	6	–	25	.194
† 2017 Big East tournament winner * Tournament #1 seed As of March 29, 2017; Rankings from AP poll

The 2016–17 Creighton Bluejays women's basketball team represented Creighton University in the 2016–17 NCAA Division I women's basketball season. The Bluejays, led by 14th year head coach Jim Flanery, played their home games at D. J. Sokol Arena and were members of the Big East Conference. They finished the season 24–8, 16–2 in Big East play to share the Big East regular season title with DePaul. They advanced to the semifinals of the Big East women's tournament where they lost to Marquette. They received an at-large bid to the NCAA women's tournament where they defeated Toledo in the first round before losing to Oregon State in the second round.

== Roster ==
2016–17 Creighton Bluejays women's basketball team
Players
Coaches

Pos.	#	Name	Height	Year	Previous school	Hometown
G	1	Jade Owens	5 ft 6 in (1.68 m)	Jr	Fenwick	River Forest, IL
G	2	Myah Mellman	5 ft 7 in (1.7 m)	Jr	Mason City	Mason City, IA
G	3	MC McGrory	5 ft 8 in (1.73 m)	Sr	Edina	Edina, MN
G	4	Aimee Rischard	5 ft 5 in (1.65 m)	Jr	Mount Saint Mary Catholic	Oklahoma City, OK
F	5	Jaylyn Agnew	5 ft 11 in (1.8 m)	RS Fr	Andover	Andover, KS
F	11	Bailey Norby	6 ft 2 in (1.88 m)	RS Jr	Forest Lake	Forest Lake, MN
G	12	Lauren Works	5 ft 7 in (1.7 m)	Sr	Lincoln Southwest	Lincoln, NE
G	14	Sydney Lamberty	5 ft 10 in (1.78 m)	Jr	Park	Cottage Grove, MN
G	21	Olivia Elger	5 ft 7 in (1.7 m)	So	Richwoods	Peoria, IL
G	22	Brooke Kissinger (I) (redshirt)	5 ft 7 in (1.7 m)	Jr	Minden; Illinois	Minden, NE
G	23	Marissa Janning	5 ft 8 in (1.73 m)	RS Sr	Watertown-Mayer	Watertown, MN
F	33	Kylie Brown	6 ft 3 in (1.91 m)	Jr	Simley	Inver Grove Heights, MN
F	40	Ali Greene	6 ft 1 in (1.85 m)	So	Mahtomedi	Lino Lakes, MN
F	45	Audrey Faber	6 ft 2 in (1.88 m)	So	Dowling Catholic	Clive, IA
F	50	Brianna Rollerson	6 ft 0 in (1.83 m)	Sr	Central	Omaha, NE

Head coach

- Jim Flanery (Creighton)

Assistant coach(es)

- Matt Fritsche (Nebraska–Kearney)
- Chevelle Herring (Creighton)
- Linda Sayavongchanh (Drake)

Legend

- (C) Team captain
- (S) Suspended
- (I) Ineligible
- (W) Walk-on
- Injured
- Current redshirt

Roster

== Schedule ==
Date time, TV	Rank^{#}	Opponent^{#}	Result	Record	Site (attendance) city, state
Exhibition
11/03/2016*; 7:00 pm		Fort Hays State	W 90–56		D. J. Sokol Arena (710); Omaha, NE
Non-conference regular season
11/11/2016*; 7:00 pm		at South Dakota State	L 56–61	0–1	Frost Arena (2,180); Brookings, SD
11/13/2016*; 2:05 pm		at Wichita State	L 54–62	0–2	Charles Koch Arena (2,003); Wichita, KS
11/17/2016*; 7:00 pm		Drake	W 80–77	1–2	D. J. Sokol Arena (847); Omaha, NE
11/25/2016*; 2:15 pm		vs. Missouri; Junkanoo Jam Freeport Division semifinals	L 63–72	1–3	St. George HS Gymnasium (437); Freeport, BAH
11/26/2016*; 3:15 pm		vs. Dayton; Junkanoo Jam Freeport Division 3rd place	W 56–53	2–3	St. George HS Gymnasium (456); Freeport, BAH
11/30/2016*; 7:00 pm		Kansas	W 69–49	3–3	D. J. Sokol Arena (1,008); Omaha, NE
12/07/2016*; 12:00 pm		Nebraska–Omaha	W 82–45	4–3	D. J. Sokol Arena (1,601); Omaha, NE
12/10/2016*; 2:00 pm		at Northern Iowa	L 49–50	4–4	McLeod Center (1,235); Cedar Falls, IA
12/18/2016*; 2:00 pm		Nebraska	W 80–64	5–4	D. J. Sokol Arena (1,160); Omaha, NE
12/21/2016*; 6:00 pm		at Marist	W 72–50	6–4	McCann Field House (1,346); Poughkeepsie, NY
Big East regular season
12/28/2016; 4:00 pm, BEDN		Butler	W 67–52	7–4 (1–0)	D. J. Sokol Arena (981); Omaha, NE
12/30/2016; 7:00 pm, BEDN		Xavier	W 63–52	8–4 (2–0)	D. J. Sokol Arena (1,104); Omaha, NE
01/02/2017; 7:30 pm, FS1		at Marquette	W 83–63	9–4 (3–0)	Al McGuire Center (1,144); Milwaukee, WI
01/04/2017; 7:00 pm, BEDN		at No. 23 DePaul	L 65–79	9–5 (3–1)	McGrath-Phillips Arena (2,082); Chicago, IL
01/08/2017; 1:00 pm, BEDN		Georgetown	W 70–68 ^{OT}	10–5 (4–1)	D. J. Sokol Arena (872); Omaha, NE
01/10/2017; 7:00 pm, BEDN		Villanova	W 60–46	11–5 (5–1)	D. J. Sokol Arena (707); Omaha, NE
01/14/2017; 11:00 am, BEDN		at Providence	W 58–51	12–5 (6–1)	Alumni Hall (384); Providence, RI
01/20/2017; 6:00 pm, BEDN		at St. John's	W 55–43	13–5 (7–1)	Carnesecca Arena (502); Queens, NY
01/22/2017; 10:00 am, BEDN		at Seton Hall	W 70–60 ^{OT}	14–5 (8–1)	Walsh Gymnasium (618); South Orange, NJ
01/27/2017; 7:00 pm, BEDN		No. 21 DePaul	L 56–60	14–6 (8–2)	D. J. Sokol Arena (1,313); Omaha, NE
01/29/2017; 1:00 pm, BEDN		Marquette	W 80–77	15–6 (9–2)	D. J. Sokol Arena (996); Omaha, NE
02/03/2017; 6:00 pm, FS2		at Villanova	W 47–44	16–6 (10–2)	The Pavilion (1,101); Villanova, PA
02/05/2017; 12:00 pm, BEDN		at Georgetown	W 67–59	17–6 (11–2)	McDonough Gymnasium (691); Washington, D.C.
02/11/2017; 1:00 pm, BEDN		Providence	W 88–57	18–6 (12–2)	D. J. Sokol Arena (1,240); Omaha, NE
02/17/2017; 7:00 pm, BEDN		Seton Hall	W 61–44	19–6 (13–2)	D. J. Sokol Arena (1,052); Omaha, NE
02/19/2017; 5:30 pm, BEDN		St. John's	W 67–60	20–6 (14–2)	D. J. Sokol Arena (1,140); Omaha, NE
02/24/2017; 7:00 pm, BEDN		at Xavier	W 67–57	21–6 (15–2)	Cintas Center (1,987); Cincinnati, OH
02/26/2017; 12:00 pm, BEDN		at Butler	W 65–53	22–6 (16–2)	Hinkle Fieldhouse (759); Indianapolis, IN
Big East Women's Tournament
03/05/2017; 12:00 pm, FS2	(2)	vs. (10) Butler; Quarterfinals	W 64–55	23–6	Al McGuire Center; Milwaukee, WI
03/06/2017; 3:00 pm, FS1	(2) No. 23	vs. (3) Marquette; Semifinals	L 65–72	23–7	Al McGuire Center; Milwaukee, WI
NCAA Women's Tournament
03/17/2017*; 6:30 pm, ESPN2	(7 S)	vs. (10 S) Toledo; First Round	W 76–49	24–7	Gill Coliseum (4,692); Corvallis, OR
03/19/2017*; 8:00 pm, ESPN2	(7 S)	at (2 S) No. 8 Oregon State; First Round	L 52–64	24–8	Gill Coliseum (5,680); Corvallis, OR
*Non-conference game. ^{#}Rankings from AP Poll. (#) Tournament seedings in parentheses. S=Stockton Region. All times are in Central.

== Rankings ==
2016–17 NCAA Division I women's basketball rankings

Regular season polls
Poll	Pre- Season	Week 2	Week 3	Week 4	Week 5	Week 6	Week 7	Week 8	Week 9	Week 10	Week 11	Week 12	Week 13	Week 14	Week 15	Week 16	Week 17	Week 18	Week 19	Final
AP	RV	RV	NR	NR	NR	NR	NR	NR	NR	NR	NR	NR	RV	RV	RV	RV	RV	23	RV	N/A
Coaches	RV	NR	NR	NR	NR	NR	NR	NR	NR	RV	RV	RV	RV	RV	NR	25	23	RV	RV	RV

Legend
	Increase in ranking
	Decrease in ranking
	Not ranked previous week
(RV)	Received Votes

== See also ==
- 2016–17 Creighton Bluejays men's basketball team
