= Carolyn Kieger =

American basketball player and coach

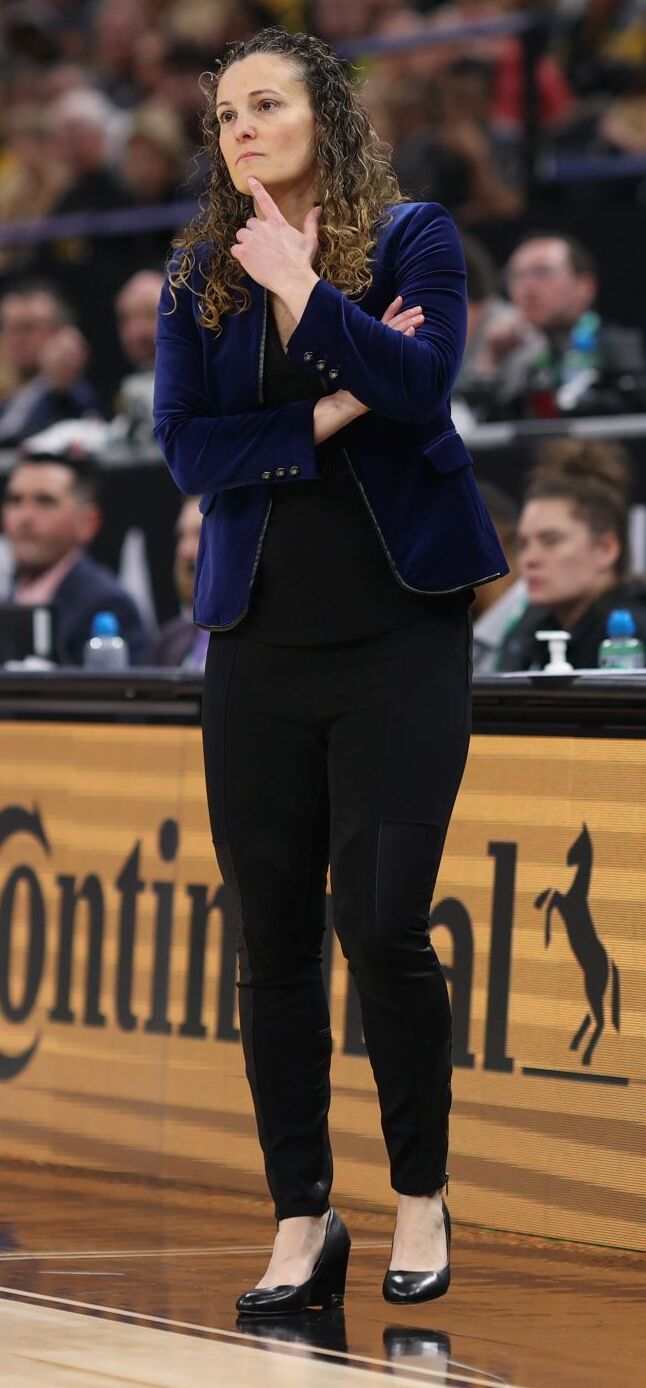
- Kieger in 2024

Biographical details
- Born: August 17, 1983 (age 43); Roseville, Minnesota, U.S.

Playing career
- 2002–2006: Marquette
- Position: Point guard

Coaching career (HC unless noted)
- 2008–2014: Miami (FL) (assistant)
- 2014–2019: Marquette
- 2019–2026: Penn State

Administrative career (AD unless noted)
- 2007–2008: Marquette (dir. of ops.)

Head coaching record
- Overall: 183–187 (.495)
- Tournaments: 2–3 (NCAA Division I)

Accomplishments and honors

Championships
- As a coach: Big East regular season (2019); Big East regular season (2018); Big East tournament (2017); As a player: CUSA All-Freshman Team (2003)

Awards
- Big East Co-Coach of the Year (2018)

Carolyn Kieger (born August 17, 1983) is a women's college basketball coach. She served as head coach for her alma mater, Marquette, from 2014 to 2019 and at Penn State from 2019 to 2026.

== Playing career ==
Kieger was born in Roseville, Minnesota. She attended college at Marquette University, where she was a four-year starter for the Golden Eagles, a three-year captain, and the all-time assists leader. Kieger is the only player in program history with at least 1,200 career points, 400 career rebounds and 600 assists. On her career, she averaged 10.3 points per game. She was a second team All-Big East Conference selection for the 2005–06 season and a second team All-Conference USA selection for the 2003–04 and 2004–05 seasons. During her senior year, she was a finalist for the Nancy Lieberman Award. In 2006, she graduated cum laude from Marquette with a bachelor's degree in broadcasting and electronic communications.

== Coaching career ==
Kieger spent six seasons as an assistant coach for the women's basketball team at the University of Miami under head coach Katie Meier. She primarily focused on developing players at the guard position. During her time at Miami, the Hurricanes made three appearances in the NCAA Tournament and two appearances in the WNIT, including a trip to the final.

Kieger was hired as the head coach of the Marquette women's basketball team on May 1, 2014, succeeding the program's all-time winningest head coach Terri Mitchell. In five seasons at the helm of her alma mater, Kieger went 99–64 and appeared in three NCAA tournaments. In the 2018–19 season, Kieger's team notched a program record 27 wins, winning the 2019 Big East regular season title and advancing to the second round of the NCAA Tournament. Kieger coached Marquette's first Big East Players of the Year in consecutive seasons: Allazia Blockton in 2017–18 and Natisha Hiedeman in 2018–19.

On April 3, 2019, Kieger left her alma mater to become the head coach of the Penn State Lady Lions. Kieger expressed her desire to compete for national titles as the primary reason for her move to Penn State.

Kieger struggled after the move to Penn State, finishing in the bottom fourth of the Big Ten each year from 2019 to 2023. In 2024, the Lady Lions got off to a torrid pace, beginning the season 16–5 and fueling speculation that the team would make the NCAA Tournament for the first time since 2014. However, a six game losing streak dashed the team's tournament hopes and they would fall to Villanova in the WBIT semifinal.

Kieger was fired by Penn State on March 5, 2026. She finished her career at Penn State with an 84–123 overall and 30–97 in the Big Ten. She was the first coach in the history of the program to finish with an overall losing record. She was also the only coach to never have a team qualify for the NCAA Tournament.

== Player stats ==
Legend
GP	Games played	GS	Games started	MPG	Minutes per game
FG%	Field goal percentage	3P%	3-point field goal percentage	FT%	Free throw percentage
RPG	Rebounds per game	APG	Assists per game	SPG	Steals per game
BPG	Blocks per game	PPG	Points per game	**Bold**	Career high

Year	Team	GP	Points	FG%	3P%	FT%	RPG	APG	SPG	BPG	PPG
2002–03	Marquette	30	338	**46.7%**	**42.6%**	**87.5%**	**4.7**	4.2	1.5	–	11.3
2003–04	Marquette	**32**	336	37.1%	29.7%	74.5%	3.6	5.9	**2.0**	–	10.5
2004–05	Marquette	30	**355**	41.7%	26.6%	81.8%	3.7	**6.2**	1.7	0.0	**11.8**
2005–06	Marquette	**32**	248	40.3%	27.8%	77.6%	3.7	6.1	1.1	–	7.8
Career		124	1277	41.2%	31.0%	80.5%	3.9	5.6	1.6	0.0	10.3

Source: NCAA

== Head coaching record ==
Record table
Season	Team	Overall	Conference	Standing	Postseason
**Marquette Golden Eagles** (Big East Conference) (2014–2019)
2014–15	Marquette	9–22	4–14	8th	
2015–16	Marquette	14–16	9–9	5th	
2016–17	Marquette	25–8	13–5	3rd	NCAA Division I First round
2017–18	Marquette	24–10	15–3	T–1st	NCAA Division I Second Round
2018–19	Marquette	27–8	15–3	1st	NCAA Division I Second Round
Marquette:		99–64 (.607)	56–34 (.622)		
**Penn State Lady Lions** (Big Ten Conference) (2019–2026)
2019–20	Penn State	7–23	1–17	14th	
2020–21	Penn State	9–15	6–13	11th	
2021–22	Penn State	11–18	5–13	12th	
2022–23	Penn State	14–17	4–14	T–12th	
2023–24	Penn State	22–13	9–9	T–6th	WBIT Semifinals
2024–25	Penn State	10–19	1–17	18th	
2025–26	Penn State	11–18	4–14	16th	
Penn State:		84–123 (.406)	30–97 (.236)		
Total:		183–187 (.495)			
National champion Postseason invitational champion Conference regular season champion Conference regular season and conference tournament champion Division regular season champion Division regular season and conference tournament champion Conference tournament champion

- Penn State
- B1G
