= 2016–17 NCAA Division I women's basketball rankings =

- Season: 2016–17
- NCAA Tournament: 2017
- Preseason No. 1: Notre Dame
- NCAA Tournament Champions: South Carolina
NCAA Division I women's basketball rankings


Two human polls make up the 2016–17 NCAA Division I women's basketball rankings, the AP Poll and the Coaches Poll, in addition to various publications' preseason polls.

== Legend ==
	Increase in ranking
	Decrease in ranking
	Not ranked previous week
Italics	Number of first place votes
(#-#)	Win–loss record
т	Tied with team above or below also with this symbol

== AP Poll ==
This poll is compiled by sportswriters across the nation. In Division I men's and women's college basketball, the AP Poll is largely just a tool to compare schools throughout the season and spark debate, as it has no bearing on postseason play.

	Preseason Nov. 4	Week 2 Nov. 14	Week 3 Nov. 21	Week 4 Nov. 28	Week 5 Dec. 5	Week 6 Dec. 12	Week 7 Dec. 19	Week 8 Dec. 26	Week 9 Jan. 2	Week 10 Jan. 9	Week 11 Jan. 16	Week 12 Jan. 23	Week 13 Jan. 30	Week 14 Feb. 6	Week 15 Feb. 13	Week 16 Feb. 20	Week 17 Feb. 27	Week 18 Mar. 6	Week 19 Mar. 13	
1.	Notre Dame (14)	Notre Dame (1-0) (14)	Notre Dame (4-0) (12)	Notre Dame (6-0) (16)	Connecticut (7-0) (16)	Connecticut (9-0) (33)	Connecticut (10-0) (33)	Connecticut (11-0) (33)	Connecticut (13-0) (33)	Connecticut (14-0) (33)	Connecticut (16-0) (33)	Connecticut (18-0) (33)	Connecticut (20-0) (33)	Connecticut (22-0) (33)	Connecticut (24-0) (33)	Connecticut (26-0) (33)	Connecticut (28-0) (33)	Connecticut (31-0) (33)	Connecticut (32-0) (33)	1.
2.	Baylor (12)	Baylor (1-0) (12)	Connecticut (3-0) (12)	Connecticut (4-0) (14)	Notre Dame (8-0) (15)	Notre Dame (9-1)	Notre Dame (10-1)	Notre Dame (11-1)	Baylor (13-1)	Baylor (15-1)	Baylor (17-1)	Baylor (18-1)	Baylor (21-1)	Baylor (23-1)	Maryland (25-1)	Maryland (26-1)	Baylor (27-2)	Baylor (30-2)	Notre Dame (30-3)	2.
3.	Connecticut (8)	Connecticut (0-0) (6)	South Carolina (2-0) (1)	South Carolina (5-0) (1)	Baylor (9-1)	Baylor (10-1)	Baylor (11-1)	Baylor (11-1)	Maryland (13-1)	Maryland (15-1)	Maryland (17-1)	Maryland (19-1)	Maryland (21-1)	Maryland (23-1)	Mississippi State (25-1)	Mississippi State (27-1)	Notre Dame (27-3)	Notre Dame (30-3)	South Carolina (27-4)	3.
4.	South Carolina (1)	South Carolina (0-0) (1)	Louisville (5-0)	Baylor (7-1)	Maryland (8-0)	Maryland (10-0)	Maryland (11-0)	Maryland (12-0)	Mississippi State (15-0)	Mississippi State (17-0)	Mississippi State (18-0)	Mississippi State (20-0)	South Carolina (18-1)	Mississippi State (23-1)	Baylor (24-2) T	Baylor (25-2)	Maryland (27-2)	South Carolina (27-4)	Maryland (30-2)	4.
5.	Louisville	Louisville (2-0)	Baylor (3-1)	Maryland (7-0)	Mississippi State (8-0)	Mississippi State (9-0)	Mississippi State (12-0)	Mississippi State (13-0)	South Carolina (11-1)	South Carolina (13-1)	South Carolina (15-1)	South Carolina (16-1)	Mississippi State (21-1)	Florida State (21-2)	Florida State (23-2) T	Notre Dame (25-3)	South Carolina (24-4)	Maryland (30-2)	Baylor (30-3)	5.
6.	Maryland	Maryland (1-0)	Maryland (4-0)	Mississippi State (5-0)	South Carolina (6-1)	South Carolina (7-1)	South Carolina (9-1)	South Carolina (10-1)	Florida State (13-1)	Notre Dame (15-2)	Notre Dame (16-2)	Florida State (19-2)	Florida State (20-2)	South Carolina (20-2)	South Carolina (21-2)	Texas (21-5)	Mississippi State (27-3)	Stanford (28-5)	Stanford (28-5)	6.
7.	Ohio State	Ohio State (1-0)	Mississippi State (4-0)	Louisville (6-1)	Florida State (8-1)	Florida State (10-1)	Florida State (10-1)	Florida State (12-1)	Notre Dame (12-2)	Florida State (15-2)	Florida State (17-2)	Washington (19-2)	Notre Dame (20-3)	Notre Dame (21-3)	Notre Dame (23-3)	South Carolina (22-4)	Oregon State (27-3)	Mississippi State (29-4)	Mississippi State (29-4)	7.
8.	Texas	Texas (0-0)	Ohio State (3-1)	Florida State (6-1)	Louisville (7-2)	Louisville (8-2)	Louisville (11-2)	Louisville (12-2)	Louisville (13-2)	Washington (15-2)	Washington (18-2)	Notre Dame (18-3)	Stanford (19-3)	Stanford (20-3)	Texas (20-4)	Florida State (24-4) T	Florida State (25-5)	Oregon state (29-4)	Oregon State (29-4)	8.
9.	UCLA	UCLA (1-0)	UCLA (3-1)	Ohio State (5-2)	UCLA (6-1)	UCLA (7-1)	Washington (11-1)	Washington (12-1)	UCLA (11-2)	Louisville (15-3)	Louisville (16-4)	Louisville (19-4)	Louisville (20-4)	Oregon State (22-2)	Washington (24-3)	Stanford (24-4) T	Ohio State (25-5)	Duke (27-5)	Duke (27-5)	9.
10.	Mississippi State	Mississippi State (2-0)	Florida State (3-1)	UCLA (5-1)	Stanford (8-1)	Stanford (8-1)	UCLA (8-2)	UCLA (9-2)	Stanford (12-2)	Oregon State (15-1)	Stanford (15-3)	Stanford (17-3)	Washington (20-3)	Washington (22-3)	Stanford (22-4)	Oregon State (25-3)	Stanford (25-5)	Florida State (25-6)	Florida State (25-6)	10.
11.	Stanford	Stanford (1-0)	Stanford (3-1) T	Stanford (6-1)	Washington (8-1)	Washington (10-1)	Miami (9-1)	Miami (11-1)	Ohio State (12-4)	Ohio State (14-4)	Oregon State (16-2)	Oregon State (18-2)	Oregon State (20-2)	Texas (18-4)	Oregon State (23-3)	Washington (25-4)	Washington (27-4)	Ohio State (26-6)	Ohio State (25-6)	11.
12.	Florida State	Florida State (1-0)	Syracuse (3-0) T	Oklahoma (5-0)	Ohio State (6-3)	Ohio State (8-3)	Ohio State (9-3)	West Virginia (12-0)	Washington (14-2)	Duke (14–2)	Texas (12-4)	Texas (14-4)	Texas (16-4)	Louisville (20-5)	Ohio State (22-5)	Ohio State (23-5)	Texas (21-7)	Washington (27-5)	Washington (27-5)	12.
13.	Tennessee	Tennessee (2-0)	Oklahoma (3-0)	Washington (6-1)	West Virginia (8-0)	Miami (8-1)	West Virginia (11-0)	Stanford (9-2)	Duke (12–1)	Stanford (13-3)	UCLA (13-4)	UCLA (15-4)	UCLA (17-4)	Ohio State (21-5)	Duke (22–4)	Duke (24–4)	Duke (25-4)	Louisville (27-7)	Louisville (27-7)	13.
14.	Miami T	Syracuse (1-0)	Texas (1-2)	Texas (2-2)	Miami (7-1)	West Virginia (10-0)	Stanford (8-2)	Ohio State (10-4)	Miami (11-2)	Miami (13-3)	Miami (14-4)	Duke (17–3)	Ohio State (19-5)	Duke (20–4)	Louisville (22-6)	Louisville (23-6)	Louisville (25-6)	Texas (23-8)	Texas (23-8)	14.
15.	Syracuse T	Kentucky (2-0)	Washington (3-1)	DePaul (5-1)	Kentucky (6-2)	Colorado (9-0)	Colorado (10-0)	Duke (11–1)	Texas (8-4)	Virginia Tech (15-0)	Duke (15–3)	Ohio State (17-5)	Duke (18–4)	UCLA (17-5)	NC State (19-6)	UCLA (20-7)	UCLA (22-7)	UCLA (23-8)	UCLA (23-8)	15.
16.	Oklahoma	Oklahoma (1-0)	Florida (3-0)	West Virginia (7-0)	DePaul (5-2)	Texas (3-4)	Texas (5-4)	Texas (6-4)	Oregon State (13-1)	Texas (10-4)	Ohio State (15-5)	Arizona State (14-5)	Miami (16-5)	Miami (17-5)	Miami (19-6)	Oklahoma (21-6)	Miami (21-7)	Miami (23-8)	Miami (23-8)	16.
17.	Washington	Washington (1-0)	Tennessee (3-1)	Kentucky (5-1)	Texas (2-4)	DePaul (6-3)	Duke (10–1)	Kentucky (9-3)	West Virginia (13-1)	UCLA (11-4)	Virginia Tech (15-1)	Miami (14-5)	DePaul (18-5)	NC State (17-6)	DePaul (22-5)	Miami (19-7)	NC State (22-7)	DePaul (25-6)	NC State (22-8)	17.
18.	Arizona State	Arizona State (2-0)	DePaul (3-0)	Miami (5-1)	Colorado (8-0)	Duke (10–1)	Kentucky (8-3)	Arizona State (9-2)	Virginia Tech (13-0)	West Virginia (14-2)	Arizona State (13-4)	NC State (15-5)	Oklahoma (16-6)	DePaul (20-5)	UCLA (18-7)	NC State (20-7)	DePaul (24-6)	NC State (22-8)	Kentucky (21-10)	18.
19.	Kentucky	Florida (1-0)	West Virginia (3-0)	Florida (4-1)	Oklahoma (5-2)	Kentucky (7-3)	Syracuse (8-3)	Virginia Tech (12-0)	Arizona State (10-3)	Arizona State (12-3)	DePaul (16-4)	Virginia Tech (16-3)	NC State (16-6)	Oklahoma (18-6)	Oklahoma (19-6)	DePaul (22-6)	Oklahoma (22-7)	Kentucky (21-10)	DePaul (26-7)	19.
20.	Florida	DePaul (2-0)	Kentucky (3-1)	Syracuse (4-3)	Syracuse (6-3)	Oklahoma (7-2)	Oklahoma (7-2)	Colorado (10-1)	California (13-1) T	South Florida (13-1)	Oklahoma (14-4)	Oklahoma (15-5)	South Florida (17-3)	Syracuse (17-7)	Michigan (21-5)	Syracuse (18-9)	Kentucky (20-9)	Drake (25-4)	Drake (28-4)	20.
21.	DePaul	West Virginia (1-0)	Miami (2-1)	Colorado (6-0)	Duke (9–1)	Syracuse (8-3)	Arizona State (8-2) T	California (12-0)	Oklahoma (11-3) T	DePaul (13-4)	NC State (14-5)	DePaul (16-5)	Green Bay (19-2)	Michigan (19-5)	Syracuse (17-8)	Drake (22-4)	Syracuse (20-9)	Syracuse (21-10)	Syracuse (21-10)	21.
22.	West Virginia	Miami (1-1)	Oregon State (3-0)	Tennessee (3-2)	South Florida (6-0)	South Florida (7-0)	South Florida (8-0) T	Oregon State (11-1)	South Florida (11-1)	Oklahoma (12-4)	Kansas State (14-4)	West Virginia (15-5)	West Virginia (16-5)	South Florida (18-4)	South Florida (20-4)	Kentucky (19-8)	Drake (23-4)	Oklahoma (22-9)	West Virginia (23-10)	22.
23.	Indiana	Indiana (2-0)	Arizona State (2-1)	Auburn (6-1)	Florida (6-2)	Arizona State (6-2)	Virginia Tech (11-0)	South Florida (10-1)	DePaul (10-4)	NC State (13-4)	South Florida (14-2)	South Florida (15-3)	Arizona State (14-7)	Arizona State (15-8)	Texas A&M (19-6)	Temple (21-5)	Missouri (21-9)	Creighton (23-6)	Oklahoma (22-9)	23.
24.	Missouri	Oregon State (1-0)	Michigan State (4-0)	Oregon State (3-1)	Oregon State (3-1)	Virginia Tech (10-0)	Kansas State (10-1)	Oklahoma (9-3)	Kentucky (9-5)	California (13-3)	West Virginia (14-4)	Green Bay (17-2)	Syracuse (15-7)	Tennessee (15-8)	Kansas State (19-7)	Missouri (19-9)	Kansas State (21-8)	Kansas State (22-10)	Kansas State (22-10)	24.
25.	Oregon State	Missouri (1-0)	Gonzaga (3-0)	Texas A&M (5-0)	Virginia Tech (7-0)	Oregon (7-1)	Oregon State (7-1)	Syracuse (9-4)	Kansas State (11-3)	Kansas State (12-4)	Texas A&M (14-4)	Kansas State (15-5)	Kentucky (15-6)	Kansas State (17-7)	Drake (20-4)	Michigan (21-7)	Temple (22-6)	Missouri (21-10)	Missouri (21-10)	25.
	Preseason Nov. 4	Week 2 Nov. 14	Week 3 Nov. 21	Week 4 Nov. 28	Week 5 Dec. 5	Week 6 Dec. 12	Week 7 Dec. 19	Week 8 Dec. 26	Week 9 Jan. 2	Week 10 Jan. 9	Week 11 Jan. 16	Week 12 Jan. 23	Week 13 Jan. 30	Week 14 Feb. 6	Week 15 Feb. 13	Week 16 Feb. 20	Week 17 Feb. 27	Week 18 Mar. 6	Week 19 Mar. 13	
		None	Dropped: Indiana (3–1); Missouri (2-1)	Dropped: Arizona State (3-2); Michigan State (6-1); Gonzaga (4-2)	Dropped: Tennessee (4-3); Auburn (6-2); Texas A&M (5-1)	Dropped: Florida (7-3); Oregon State (6-1)	Dropped: DePaul (7-4); Oregon (9-2)	Dropped: Kansas State (10-2)	Dropped: Colorado; Syracuse (9-5)	Dropped: Kentucky (9-6)	None	Dropped: Texas A&M (15-5)	Dropped: Virginia Tech (16-5); Kansas State (16-6)	Dropped: Green Bay (19-4); West Virginia (16-7); Kentucky (16-8)	Dropped: Arizona State (16–9); Tennessee (16–9)	Dropped: South Florida (20-6); Texas A&M (19-8); Kansas State (19-8)	Dropped: Michigan (22-8)	Dropped: Temple (23-7)	Dropped: Creighton (23-7)	

== USA Today Coaches Poll ==
The Coaches Poll is the second oldest poll still in use after the AP Poll. It is compiled by a rotating group of 32 college Division I head coaches. The Poll operates by Borda count. Each voting member ranks teams from 1 to 25. Each team then receives points for their ranking in reverse order: Number 1 earns 25 points, number 2 earns 24 points, and so forth. The points are then combined and the team with the highest points is then ranked #1; second highest is ranked #2 and so forth. Only the top 25 teams with points are ranked, with teams receiving first place votes noted the quantity next to their name. The maximum points a single team can earn is 800.

	Preseason Nov. 4	Week 2 Nov. 14	Week 3 Nov. 21	Week 4 Nov. 28	Week 5 Dec. 5	Week 6 Dec. 12	Week 7 Dec. 19	Week 8 Dec. 26	Week 9 Jan. 2	Week 10 Jan. 9	Week 11 Jan. 16	Week 12 Jan. 23	Week 13 Jan. 30	Week 14 Feb. 6	Week 15 Feb. 13	Week 16 Feb. 20	Week 17 Feb. 27	Week 18 Mar. 6	Week 19 Mar. 13	Final Apr. 4	
1.	Connecticut (18)	Notre Dame (2–0) (13)	Notre Dame (4–0) (17)	Notre Dame (6–0) (18)	Notre Dame (8–0) (18)	Connecticut (9–0) (32)	Connecticut (10–0) (31)	Connecticut (11–0) (32)	Connecticut (13–0) (32)	Connecticut (14–0) (31)	Connecticut (16–0) (32)	Connecticut (18–0) (32)	Connecticut (20–0) (32)	Connecticut (22–0) (32)	Connecticut (25–0) (32)	Connecticut (26–0) (32)	Connecticut (29–0) (32)	Connecticut (32–0) (32)	Connecticut (32–0) (32)	South Carolina (33-4) (32)	1.
2.	Notre Dame (8)	Connecticut (1–0) (13)	Connecticut (3–0) (13)	Connecticut (4–0) (11)	Connecticut (7–0) (14)	Notre Dame (9–1)	Notre Dame (10–1)	Notre Dame (11–1)	Baylor (13–1)	Baylor (15–1)	Baylor (17–1)	Baylor (19–1)	Baylor (21–1)	Maryland (23–1)	Maryland (25–1)	Mississippi State (27–1)	Baylor (28–2)	Notre Dame (30–3)	Notre Dame (30–3)	Mississippi State (34-5)	2.
3.	South Carolina (3)	South Carolina (1–0) (4)	South Carolina (3–0) (2)	South Carolina (5–0) (3)	Baylor (9–1)	Maryland (11–0)	Maryland (11–0)	Maryland (12–0)	Maryland (13–1)	Maryland (15–1)	Maryland (17–1)	Maryland (19–1)	Maryland (21–1)	Mississippi State (23–1)	Mississippi State (25–1)	Baylor (26–2)	Notre Dame (27–3)	Maryland (30–2)	Maryland (30–2)	Connecticut (36-1)	3.
4.	Baylor (2)	Baylor (2–0) (2)	Louisville (6–0)	Baylor (7–1)	Maryland (8–0)	Baylor (10–1)	Baylor (11–1)	Baylor (11–1)	Mississippi State (15–0)	Mississippi State (17–0)	Mississippi State (19–0)	South Carolina (17–1)	Mississippi State (21–1)	Florida State (22–2)	Baylor (24–2)	Notre Dame (25–3)	Maryland (27–2)	South Carolina (27–4)	South Carolina (27–4)	Stanford (32-6)	4.
5.	Maryland	Maryland (1–0)	Maryland (4–0)	Maryland (6–0)	Mississippi State (8–0)	Mississippi State (9–0)	Mississippi State (12–0)	Mississippi State (13–0)	South Carolina (11–1)	South Carolina (13–1)	South Carolina (15–1)	Mississippi State (20–1)	Florida State (20–2)	Baylor (23–2)	South Carolina (21–3)	Maryland (26–2)	South Carolina (24–4)	Baylor (30–3)	Baylor (30–3)	Notre Dame (33-4)	5.
6.	Ohio State	Louisville (2–0)	Baylor (3–1)	Mississippi State (7–0)	South Carolina (6–1)	South Carolina (7–1)	South Carolina (9–1)	South Carolina (10–1)	Notre Dame (13–2)	Notre Dame (15–2)	Florida State (17–2)	Florida State (19–2)	South Carolina (18–2)	South Carolina (20–2)	Notre Dame (23–3)	Stanford (24–4)	Oregon State (27–3)	Stanford (28–5)	Stanford (28–5)	Baylor (33-4)	6.
7.	Texas (1)	Stanford (2–0)	Mississippi State (4–0)	Louisville (6–1)	Florida State (8–1)	Florida State (10–1)	Florida State (11–1)	Florida State (12–1)	UCLA (11–2)	Florida State (15–2)	Washington (18–2)	Washington (19–2)	Louisville (20–4)	Notre Dame (22–3)	Florida State (23–3)	South Carolina (22–4)	Mississippi State (27–3)	Mississippi State (29–4)	Mississippi State (29–4)	Florida State (28-7)	7.
8.	Louisville	Ohio State (1–1)	Ohio State (3–1)	Florida State (6–1)	Louisville (7–2)	Louisville (8–2)	Louisville (11–2)	Louisville (12–2)	Florida State (13–2)	Louisville (15–3)	Louisville (16–4)	Louisville (18–4)	Notre Dame (20–3)	Washington (22–3)	Texas (21–4)	Oregon State (25–3)	Ohio State (25–5)	Oregon State (29–4)	Oregon State (29–4)	Maryland (32-3)	8.
9.	UCLA	Mississippi State (2–0)	Florida State (3–1)	UCLA (5–1)	UCLA (6–1)	UCLA (7–1)	Washington (11–1)	Washington (12–1)	Louisville (13–3)	Washington (16–2)	Notre Dame (16–3)	Notre Dame (18–3)	Stanford (19–3)	Oregon State (22–2)	Washington (24–3)	Ohio State (24–5)	Stanford (25–5)	Duke (27–5)	Duke (27–5)	Oregon State (31-5)	9.
10.	Stanford	Texas (0–1)	UCLA (3–1)	Ohio State (5–2)	Stanford (8–1)	Stanford (8–1)	UCLA (8–2)	UCLA (9–2)	Stanford (12–2)	Oregon State (15–1)	Stanford (15–3)	Stanford (17–3)	Washington (20–3)	Texas (19–4)	Stanford (22–4)	Texas (21–6)	Washington (27–4)	Ohio State (26–6)	Ohio State (26–6)	Ohio State (28-7)	10.
11.	Mississippi State	UCLA (1–1)	Stanford (3–1)	Stanford (6–1)	Washington (8–1)	Washington (10–1)	Miami (10–1)	Miami (11–1)	Washington (14–2)	Ohio State (14–4)	UCLA (13–4)	Oregon State (18–2)	Oregon State (20–2)	Stanford (20–4)	Oregon State (23–3)	Florida State (24–4)	Duke (25–4)	Washington (27–5)	Washington (27–5)	Washington (29-6)	11.
12.	Florida State	Florida State (1–1)	Oklahoma (3–0)	Oklahoma (5–0)	Ohio State (6–3)	Miami (8–1)	West Virginia (11–0)	West Virginia (12–0)	Oregon State (13–1)	Stanford (13–3)	Oregon State (16–2)	UCLA (15–4)	UCLA (17–4)	UCLA (18–5)	Ohio State (22–5)	Washington (25–4)	Florida State (25–5)	Louisville (27–7)	Louisville (27–7)	Louisville (29-8)	12.
13.	Syracuse	Tennessee (2–0)	Washington (3–0)	Washington (6–1)	Miami (7–1)	Ohio State (8–3)	Ohio State (9–4)	Ohio State (10–4)	Ohio State (12–4)	UCLA (11–4)	Ohio State (15–5)	Texas (14–4)	Texas (16–4)	Ohio State (21–5)	Louisville (22–6)	Duke (24–4)	Louisville (25–6)	Florida State (25–6)	Florida State (25–6)	UCLA (25-9)	13.
14.	Tennessee	Syracuse (2–0)	Texas (1–2)	DePaul (5–1)	West Virginia (9–0)	West Virginia (10–0)	Stanford (8–2)	Stanford (9–2)	Miami (12–2)	Miami (13–3)	Miami (14–4)	Ohio State (17–5)	Ohio State (19–5)	Louisville (20–6)	Duke (22–4)	Louisville (23–6)	Texas (22–7)	UCLA (23–8)	UCLA (23–8)	Texas (25-9)	14.
15.	Washington	Washington (2–0)	Oregon State (3–0)	Texas (2–2)	DePaul (6–2)	Oregon State (6–1)	Oregon State (8–1)	Oregon State (10–1)	Duke (13–1)	Duke (14–2)	Texas (12–4)T	Duke (17–3)	Duke (18–4)	Duke (20–4)	DePaul (22–5)	UCLA (20–7)	UCLA (22–7)	Texas (23–8)	Texas (23–8)	Duke (28-6)	15.
16.	Arizona State	Arizona State (2–0)	Tennessee (3–1)	Miami (5–1)	Oregon State (5–1)	DePaul (6–3)	Syracuse (8–3)	Texas (6–4)	West Virginia (13–1)	Virginia Tech (15–0)	Duke (15–3)	Arizona State (14–5)	Miami (16–5)	DePaul (20–5)	UCLA (18–7)	Oklahoma (21–6)	Miami (21–7)	Miami (23–8)	Miami (23–8)	Oregon (23-14)	16.
17.	Oregon State	Oklahoma (1–0)	DePaul (3–0)	West Virginia (7–0)	Texas (2–4)	Texas (3–4)	Texas (5–4)	Duke (11–1)	Texas (8–4)	Texas (10–4)	Virginia Tech (16–1)T	Miami (14–5)	DePaul (18–5)	Miami (17–6)T	Miami (19–6)	Miami (19–7)	DePaul (24–6)	DePaul (26–6)	NC State (22–8)	NC State (23-9)	17.
18.	Oklahoma	Oregon State (2–0)	Syracuse (3–1)	Oregon State (3–1)	Kentucky (6–2)	Syracuse (8–3)	Duke (10–1)	California (12–0)	Virginia Tech (14–0)	Arizona State (13–3)	DePaul (16–4)	NC State (15–5)	Arizona State (14–7)	NC State (17–6)T	NC State (19–6)	DePaul (22–6)	NC State (22–7)	NC State (22–8)	Drake (25–4)	DePaul (27-8)	18.
19.	Kentucky	Kentucky (2–0)	Michigan State (4–0)	Texas A&M (5–0)	Syracuse (6–3)	South Florida (7–0)	Arizona State (8–2)	Arizona State (9–2)	Arizona State (10–3)	West Virginia (14–2)	Arizona State (13–4)	DePaul (16–5)	NC State (16–6)	Syracuse (17–7)	Oklahoma (20–6)	NC State (20–7)	Oklahoma (22–8)	Drake (25–4)	DePaul (26–7)	Miami (24-9)	19.
20.	Miami	DePaul (2–0)	Florida (3–0)	Kentucky (5–1)	Oklahoma (5–2)	Duke (10–1)	California (10–0)	Virginia Tech (12–0)	California (13–1)	DePaul (15–4)	Oklahoma (14–4)	Oklahoma (15–5)	South Florida (17–3)	Oklahoma (18–6)	Michigan (21–5)	Temple (21–5)	Syracuse (20–9)	Oklahoma (22–9)	Oklahoma (22–9)	West Virginia (24-11)	20.
21.	DePaul	Michigan State (2–0)	Arizona State (2–1)	Syracuse (4–3)	Duke (9–1)	Arizona State (6–2)	Oklahoma (8–2)	Syracuse (9–4)	DePaul (11–4)	South Florida (13–1)	NC State (14–5)	Virginia Tech (16–3)	Syracuse (15–7)	Arizona State (15–8)	Syracuse (18–8)	Syracuse (18–9)	Temple (23–6)	Syracuse (21–10)	West Virginia (23–10)	Oklahoma (23-10)	21.
22.	Michigan State	Miami (1–1)	Miami (3–1)	Michigan State (6–1)	South Florida (6–0)	Oklahoma (7–2)	DePaul (7–4)	DePaul (8–4)	South Florida (11–1)	NC State (13–4)	South Florida (14–2)	West Virginia (15–5)	Oklahoma (16–6)	Michigan (19–5)	South Florida (20–4)	Drake (22–4)	Drake (23–4)	Temple (24–7)	Syracuse (21–10)	Syracuse (22-11)	22.
23.	Texas A&M	Florida (2–0)	West Virginia (3–0)	Florida (4–1)	Arizona State (5–2)	Kentucky (7–3)	Virginia Tech (11–0)	Kentucky (9–3)	NC State (12–3)	California (13–3)	West Virginia (14–4)	South Florida (15–3)	West Virginia (16–6)	South Florida (18–4)	Arizona State (16–9)	Arizona State (17–10)	Creighton (22–6)	West Virginia (23–10)	Temple (24–7)	Quinnipiac (29-7)	23.
24.	Florida	Texas A&M (1–0)	Kentucky (3–1)	Arizona State (3–2)	California (7–0)	California (9–0)	Kentucky (8–3)	Oklahoma (9–3)	Oklahoma (11–3)	Syracuse (12–5)	Syracuse (13–6)	Syracuse (14–7)	Green Bay (19–2)	California (17–7)	Texas A&M (19–6)	Michigan (21–7)	Kentucky (20–9)	Kentucky (21–10)	Kentucky (21–10)	Drake (28-5)	24.
25.	West Virginia	West Virginia (1–0)	Texas A&M (3–0)	Tennessee (3–2)	Florida (6–2)	Virginia Tech (10–0)	South Florida (8–1)	South Florida (10–1)	Syracuse (10–5)	Oklahoma (12–4)	Green Bay (15–2)	Green Bay (17–2)	Tennessee (14–7)	Tennessee (15–8)	Temple (19–5)	Creighton (20–6)	Arizona State (18–11)	South Florida (24–8)	Marquette (25–7)	Kentucky (22-11)	25.
	Preseason Nov. 4	Week 2 Nov. 14	Week 3 Nov. 21	Week 4 Nov. 28	Week 5 Dec. 5	Week 6 Dec. 12	Week 7 Dec. 19	Week 8 Dec. 26	Week 9 Jan. 2	Week 10 Jan. 9	Week 11 Jan. 16	Week 12 Jan. 23	Week 13 Jan. 30	Week 14 Feb. 6	Week 15 Feb. 13	Week 16 Feb. 20	Week 17 Feb. 27	Week 18 Mar. 6	Week 19 Mar. 13	Final Apr. 4	
		None	None	None	Dropped: Tennessee; Michigan State; Texas A&M	Dropped: Florida	None	None	Dropped: Kentucky	None	Dropped: California	None	Dropped: Virginia Tech	Dropped: West Virginia, Green Bay	Dropped: California, Tennessee	Dropped: South Florida, Texas A&M	Dropped: Michigan	Dropped: Creighton, Arizona State	Dropped: South Florida	Dropped: Temple, Marquette	

== See also ==
- 2016–17 NCAA Division I men's basketball rankings
