= Al McGuire Center =

Arena in Milwaukee, Wisconsin

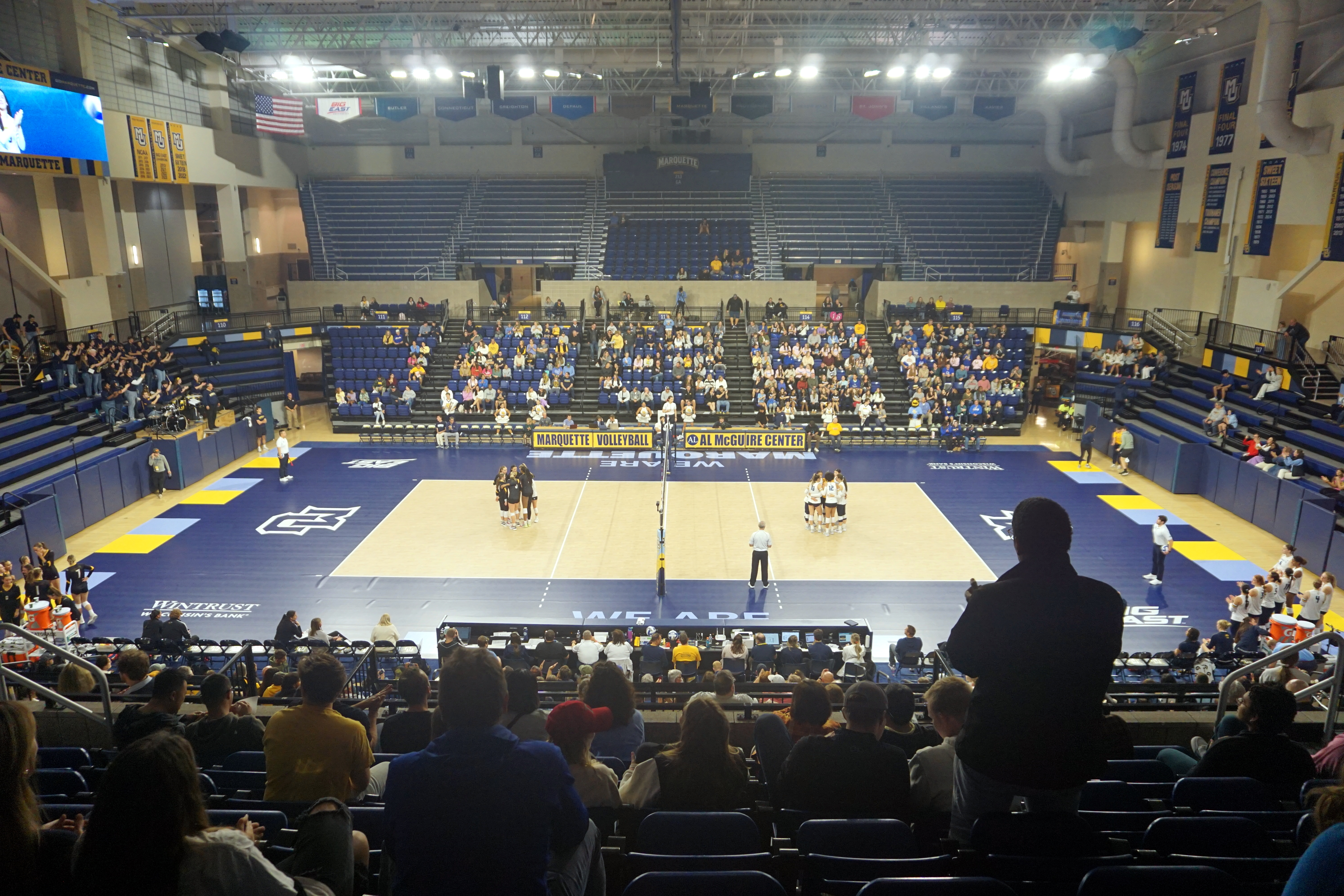
- Interior of the Al McGuire Center in 2024
- Interactive map of Al McGuire Center
- Location: 770 N 12th St; Milwaukee, WI 53233
- Coordinates: 43°2′23″N 87°55′35″W
- Owner: Marquette University
- Operator: Marquette University
- Capacity: 3,700
- Public transit: MCTS

Construction
- Groundbreaking: May 1, 2002
- Opened: January 4, 2004
- Cost: $31 million

Tenants
- Marquette Golden Eagles (women's basketball and volleyball) (2004–present)

The Al McGuire Center is a 3,700-seat arena in Milwaukee, Wisconsin, which serves as the home arena for the Marquette Golden Eagles women's basketball and volleyball teams; it also serves as a practice facility for the men's basketball team. The $31 million athletic facility opened in 2004, replacing the Marquette Gymnasium. The complex is named for Al McGuire, the coach who led the men's basketball team to an NCAA championship, an NIT title, and 295 victories in 13 seasons. The McGuire Center offers practice facilities for men's and women's basketball, including strength and conditioning and sports medicine facilities, an academic center for student athletes, and a Marquette Athletics Hall of Fame.

== See also ==
- List of NCAA Division I basketball arenas
