= 2016–17 Texas Tech Lady Raiders basketball team =

Intercollegiate basketball season

2016–17 Texas Tech Lady Raiders basketball
- Conference: Big 12 Conference
- Record: 14–17 (5–13 Big 12)
- Head coach: Candi Whitaker (4th season)
- Assistant coaches: Matt Corkery; Brandi Poole; Ray Caldwell
- Home arena: United Supermarkets Arena

2016–17 Big 12 Conference women's basketball standings
	Conf.				Overall
Team	W		L	PCT	W		L	PCT
No. 5 Baylor	17	–	1	.944	33	–	4	.892
No. 14 Texas	15	–	3	.833	25	–	9	.735
No. 23 Oklahoma	13	–	5	.722	23	–	10	.697
No. 24 Kansas State	11	–	7	.611	23	–	11	.676
Iowa State	9	–	9	.500	18	–	13	.581
No. 22 West Virginia †	8	–	10	.444	24	–	11	.686
Oklahoma State	6	–	12	.333	17	–	15	.531
Texas Tech	5	–	13	.278	14	–	17	.452
TCU	4	–	14	.222	12	–	18	.400
Kansas	2	–	16	.111	8	–	22	.267
† 2017 Big 12 tournament winner Rankings from AP poll

The 2016–17 Texas Tech Lady Raiders basketball team represented Texas Tech University in the 2016–17 NCAA Division I women's basketball season. The Lady Raiders, led by fourth-year head coach Candi Whitaker, played their homes games at United Supermarkets Arena and were members of the Big 12 Conference. They finished the season 14–17, 5–13 in Big 12 play, to finish in eighth place. They advanced to the quarterfinals of the Big 12 women's tournament, where they lost to Baylor.

== 2016–17 media ==
=== Television & radio information ===
Select Lady Raiders games were shown on FSN affiliates throughout the season, including FSSW, FSSW+, and FCS Atlantic, Central, and Pacific. All games were broadcast on the Lady Raiders Radio Network on either KLZK or KJTV.

== Roster ==
2016–17 Texas Tech Lady Raiders women's basketball team
Players
Coaches

Pos.	#	Name	Height	Year	Previous school	Hometown
F	00	Brielle Blaire	6 ft 2 in (1.88 m)	Jr	Terra Nova; Virginia Tech	Salisbury, NC
G	2	Ivonne Cook-Taylor	5 ft 8 in (1.73 m)	RS Sr	Terra Nova	San Francisco, CA
G	5	Recee' Caldwell	5 ft 8 in (1.73 m)	RS So	Homeschooled; UCLA	San Antonio, TX
G	5	Larryn Brooks	5 ft 6 in (1.68 m)	RS Jr	Madison Central; Indiana	Richmond, KY
G	10	Grayson Bright	5 ft 11 in (1.8 m)	Fr	Fossil Ridge	Fort Worth, TX
G	11	Rayven Brooks	6 ft 0 in (1.83 m)	Sr	San Ramon Dougherty; Chipola College	Oakland, CA
C	12	Jada Terry	6 ft 4 in (1.93 m)	RS Jr	Cedar Hill; Texas A&M	Cedar Hill, TX
F	20	Brittany Brewer	6 ft 4 in (1.93 m)	Fr	Wylie	Abilene, TX
G	23	Arella Guirantes	5 ft 11 in (1.8 m)	Fr	Bellport	Bellport, NY
G	24	Japreece Dean	5 ft 6 in (1.68 m)	So	Vista Ridge	Cedar Park, TX
C	25	Leashja Grant	6 ft 2 in (1.88 m)	Sr	Sunrise Christian Academy; Trinity Valley CC	Nassau, Bahamas
F	30	Zuri Sanders	6 ft 0 in (1.83 m)	So	Evansville Central	Evansville, IN
G/F	32	Dayo Olabode	6 ft 2 in (1.88 m)	Jr	Mansfield Timberview	Arlington, TX
C	42	Ionna McKenzie	6 ft 2 in (1.88 m)	Jr	Dr. Phillips	Gotha, FL

Head coach

- Candi Whitaker (Valparaiso)

Assistant coach(es)

- Matt Corkery (West Texas A&M)
- Brett Schneider (West Virginia Wesleyan)
- Ray Caldwell (Chapman)

Legend

- (C) Team captain
- (S) Suspended
- (I) Ineligible
- (W) Walk-on
- Injured
- Current redshirt

Roster
Last update: July 14, 2024

== Schedule ==
Date time, TV	Rank^{#}	Opponent^{#}	Result	Record	Site (attendance) city, state
Exhibition
11/07/2016*; 2:00 p.m.		Midwestern State	W 121–56		United Supermarkets Arena (3,251); Lubbock, TX
Non-conference regular season
11/13/2016*; 2:00 p.m., FSSW+		North Dakota	W 90–80	1–0	United Supermarkets Arena (4,232); Lubbock, TX
11/17/2016*; 7:00 p.m.		at Texas A&M	L 90–98 ^{OT}	1–1	Reed Arena (3,085); College Station, TX
11/20/2016*; 2:00 p.m., FSSW		New Mexico	W 69–58	2–1	United Supermarkets Arena (3,697); Lubbock, TX
11/25/2016*; 1:00 p.m.		vs. Fordham; Miami Thanksgiving Tournament semifinals	W 59–50	3–1	Watsco Center (725); Coral Gables, FL
11/27/2016*; 11:00 a.m., ACCN Extra		at Miami (FL); Miami Thanksgiving Tournament championship	L 56–71	3–2	Watsco Center (722); Coral Gables, FL
11/29/2016*; 6:30 p.m.		Prairie View A&M	W 85–43	4–2	United Supermarkets Arena (3,544); Lubbock, TX
12/03/2016*; 3:00 p.m., SECN		at Arkansas; Big 12/SEC Women's Challenge	L 60–66	4–3	Bud Walton Arena (1,370); Fayetteville, AR
12/07/2016*; 11:00 a.m.		Houston	W 84–60	5–3	United Supermarkets Arena (5,242); Lubbock, TX
12/14/2016*; 5:30 p.m.		Central Arkansas	W 79–45	6–3	United Supermarkets Arena (4,172); Lubbock, TX
12/18/2016*; 3:00 p.m.		Alcorn State	W 90–37	7–3	United Supermarkets Arena (4,603); Lubbock, TX
12/22/2016*; 2:00 p.m.		Texas–Arlington	W 79–60	8–3	United Supermarkets Arena (4,794); Lubbock, TX
Big 12 regular season
12/29/2016; 7:00 p.m., LHN		at No. 16 Texas	L 47–67	8–4 (0–1)	Frank Erwin Center (4,093); Austin, TX
01/01/2017; 2:00 p.m.		Oklahoma State	W 70–65	9–4 (1–1)	United Supermarkets Arena (4,146); Lubbock, TX
01/04/2017; 6:00 p.m., FSSW+		Iowa State	W 75–66	10–4 (2–1)	United Supermarkets Arena (5,406); Lubbock, TX
01/07/2017; 7:00 p.m., ESPN3		at No. 25 Kansas State	L 54–68	10–5 (2–2)	Bramlage Coliseum (4,615); Manhattan, KS
01/11/2017; 6:30 p.m., FSSW+		No. 18 West Virginia	W 75–66	11–5 (3–2)	United Supermarkets Arena (4,829); Lubbock, TX
01/14/2017; 2:00 p.m.		at No. 22 Oklahoma	L 45-66	11–6 (3–3)	Lloyd Noble Center (3,556); Norman, OK
01/21/2016; 6:00 p.m.		No. 12 Texas	L 57–77	11–7 (3–4)	United Supermarkets Arena (5,236); Lubbock, TX
01/25/2017; 6:00 p.m.		at No. 22 West Virginia	L 79–89	11–8 (3–5)	WVU Coliseum (2,051); Morgantown, WV
01/28/2017; 11:00 a.m., FSN		at Kansas	L 60–66	11–9 (3–6)	Allen Fieldhouse (2,047); Lawrence, KS
02/01/2017; 6:30 p.m., FSSW+		Kansas State	L 53–65	11–10 (3–7)	United Supermarkets Arena (3,440); Lubbock, TX
02/04/2017; 2:00 p.m.		No. 2 Baylor	L 61–79	11–11 (3–8)	United Supermarkets Arena (5,054); Lubbock, TX
02/08/2017; 7:00 p.m., FSSW		at TCU	L 62–76	11–12 (3–9)	Schollmaier Arena (2,396); Fort Worth, TX
02/11/2017; 6:30 p.m., FSSW+		No. 19 Oklahoma	L 56–64	11–13 (3–10)	United Supermarkets Arena (4,239); Lubbock, TX
02/15/2017; 7:00 p.m.		at Iowa State	L 68–79	11–14 (3–11)	Hilton Coliseum (9,927); Ames, IA
02/18/2017; 2:00 p.m., FSSW+		Kansas	W 75–60	12–14 (4–11)	United Supermarkets Arena (4,765); Lubbock, TX
02/22/2017; 7:00 p.m., FSOK		at Oklahoma State	L 62–75	12–15 (4–12)	Gallagher-Iba Arena (1,783); Stillwater, OK
02/25/2017; 12:00 p.m., FSSW		at No. 4 Baylor	L 48-86	12–16 (4–13)	Ferrell Center (7,055); Waco, TX
02/27/2017; 7:00 p.m., FSN		TCU	W 79–64	13–16 (5–13)	United Supermarkets Arena (3,784); Lubbock, TX
Big 12 women's tournament
03/03/2017; 6:00 p.m., FCS	(8)	vs. (9) TCU; First round	W 76–58	14–16	Chesapeake Energy Arena; Oklahoma City, OK
03/04/2017; 11:00 a.m., FSN	(8)	vs. (1) No. 2 Baylor; Quarterfinals	L 63–95	14–17	Chesapeake Energy Arena (3,420); Oklahoma City, OK
*Non-conference game. ^{#}Rankings from AP poll. (#) Tournament seedings in parentheses. All times are in Central.

== See also ==
- 2016–17 Texas Tech Red Raiders basketball team
