= 2016–17 Oklahoma State Cowgirls basketball team =

Intercollegiate basketball season

2016–17 Oklahoma State Cowgirls basketball

WNIT, First Round
- Conference: Big 12 Conference
- Record: 17–15 (6–12 Big 12)
- Head coach: Jim Littell (6th season)
- Assistant coaches: Bill Annan; Ashley Davis; Rebecca Kates-Taylor
- Home arena: Gallagher-Iba Arena

2016–17 Big 12 Conference women's basketball standings
	Conf.				Overall
Team	W		L	PCT	W		L	PCT
No. 5 Baylor	17	–	1	.944	33	–	4	.892
No. 14 Texas	15	–	3	.833	25	–	9	.735
No. 23 Oklahoma	13	–	5	.722	23	–	10	.697
No. 24 Kansas State	11	–	7	.611	23	–	11	.676
Iowa State	9	–	9	.500	18	–	13	.581
No. 22 West Virginia †	8	–	10	.444	24	–	11	.686
Oklahoma State	6	–	12	.333	17	–	15	.531
Texas Tech	5	–	13	.278	14	–	17	.452
TCU	4	–	14	.222	12	–	18	.400
Kansas	2	–	16	.111	8	–	22	.267
† 2017 Big 12 tournament winner Rankings from AP poll

The 2016–17 Oklahoma State Cowgirls basketball team represented Oklahoma State University in the 2016–17 NCAA Division I women's basketball season. The Cowgirls, led by sixth year head coach Jim Littell, played their home games at Gallagher-Iba Arena and were members of the Big 12 Conference. They finished the season 17–15, 6–12 in Big 12 play to finish in a tie for seventh place. They advanced to the quarterfinals of the Big 12 women's tournament, where they lost to Texas. They received an at-large bid to the Women's National Invitation Tournament, where they lost to Abilene Christian in the first round.

== Roster ==
2016–17 Oklahoma State Cowgirls women's basketball team
Players
Coaches

Pos.	#	Name	Height	Year	Previous school	Hometown
F/C	3	Mandy Coleman	6 ft 3 in (1.91 m)	Jr	McNair	Stockton, CA
G	5	Diana Omozee	5 ft 11 in (1.8 m)	Sr	Pflugerville	Pflugerville, TX
G	10	Shakila Small	6 ft 3 in (1.91 m)	Jr	Medgar Evers College Prep	Brooklyn, NY
G	11	Areanna Combs	5 ft 10 in (1.78 m)	Fr	Putnam City West	Oklahoma City, OK
F	13	Jentry Holt	6 ft 3 in (1.91 m)	So	Elgin	Elgin, OK
G	15	Rodrea Echols	5 ft 10 in (1.78 m)	Fr	Overton	Memphis, TN
F	20	LaTashia Jones	6 ft 2 in (1.88 m)	So	Leavenworth	Leavenworth, KS
F	22	Alexes Bryant	6 ft 3 in (1.91 m)	Fr	Steele	Cibolo, TX
G	23	Jaden Hobbs	5 ft 8 in (1.73 m)	Fr	Alva	Alva, OK
G	24	Karli Wheeler	5 ft 8 in (1.73 m)	So	Plainview	Plainview, TX
F	45	Katelyn Loecker	6 ft 0 in (1.83 m)	Sr	McPherson	McPherson, KS
C	54	Kaylee Jensen	6 ft 4 in (1.93 m)	Jr	Lindsay Holy Family	Genoa, NE

Head coach

- Jim Littell (Southwestern (KS))

Assistant coach(es)

- Bill Annan (Kansas State)
- Ashley Davis (TCU)
- Rebecca Kates-Taylor (Mississippi State)

Legend

- (C) Team captain
- (S) Suspended
- (I) Ineligible
- (W) Walk-on
- Injured
- Current redshirt

Roster

== Schedule and results ==
Date time, TV	Rank^{#}	Opponent^{#}	Result	Record	Site (attendance) city, state
Exhibition
10/30/2016*; 2:00 pm		Southwestern Oklahoma State	W 97–42		Gallagher-Iba Arena; Stillwater, OK
Non-conference regular season
11/11/2016*; 11:00 am		Arkansas State	W 76–34	1–0	Gallagher-Iba Arena (3,124); Stillwater, OK
11/15/2016*; 7:00 pm		Tennessee State	W 86–48	2–0	Gallagher-Iba Arena (2,983); Stillwater, OK
11/17/2016*; 7:00 pm		Loyola Marymount	W 66–58	3–0	Gallagher-Iba Arena (1,752); Stillwater, OK
11/20/2016*; 2:00 pm, P12N		at Washington State	W 79–72 ^{OT}	4–0	Beasley Coliseum (542); Pullman, WA
11/23/2016*; 7:00 pm		Northern Iowa	W 81–57	5–0	Gallagher-Iba Arena (2,153); Stillwater, OK
11/26/2016*; 1:00 pm		Rice	W 65–51	6–0	Gallagher-Iba Arena (2,057); Stillwater, OK
12/03/2016*; 7:00 pm		Georgia; Big 12/SEC Women's Challenge	W 71–51	7–0	Gallagher-Iba Arena (2,497); Stillwater, OK
12/11/2016*; 1:00 pm		Texas–Rio Grande Valley	W 86–53	8–0	Gallagher-Iba Arena (1,749); Stillwater, OK
12/19/2016*; 7:30 pm		vs. Santa Clara; Play4Kay Shootout quarterfinals	W 67–53	9–0	T-Mobile Arena; Paradise, NV
12/20/2016*; 7:30 pm		vs. Long Beach State; Play4Kay Shootout semifinals	W 63–57	10–0	T-Mobile Arena; Paradise, NV
12/21/2016*; 10:00 pm		vs. No. 25 Oregon State; Play4Kay Shootout championship	L 54–73	10–1	T-Mobile Arena (1,233); Paradise, NV
Conference regular season
12/29/2016; 7:00 pm		Iowa State	W 71–59	11–1 (1–0)	Gallagher-Iba Arena (2,759); Stillwater, OK
01/01/2017; 2:00 pm		at Texas Tech	L 65–70	11–2 (1–1)	United Supermarkets Arena (4,146); Lubbock, TX
01/04/2017; 8:00 pm, FSSW+		at TCU	W 82–67	12–2 (2–1)	Schollmaier Arena (1,628); Fort Worth, TX
01/07/2017; 2:00 pm		No. 2 Baylor	L 50–86	12–3 (2–2)	Gallagher-Iba Arena (2,612); Stillwater, OK
01/10/2017; 7:00 pm, LHN		at No. 16 Texas	L 35–66	12–4 (2–3)	Frank Erwin Center (2,624); Austin, TX
01/14/2017; 4:00 pm, FSOK		No. 25 Kansas State	L 43–63	12–5 (2–4)	Gallagher-Iba Arena (1,957); Stillwater, OK
01/22/2017; 2:00 pm		at No. 20 Oklahoma; Bedlam Series	L 62–68	12–6 (2–5)	Lloyd Noble Center (6,543); Norman, OK
01/25/2017; 7:00 pm, FSSW+		Kansas	W 74–70	13–6 (3–5)	Gallagher-Iba Arena (1,865); Stillwater, OK
01/28/2017; 3:00 pm, FSN		at No. 25 Kansas State	L 69–74	13–7 (3–6)	Bramlage Coliseum (6,000); Manhattan, TX
02/01/2017; 7:00 pm, FSOK		No. 12 Texas	L 71–85	13–8 (3–7)	Gallagher-Iba Arena (1,846); Stillwater, OK
02/04/2017; 12:00 pm, FSN		No. 18 Oklahoma; Bedlam Series	L 60–66	13–9 (3–8)	Gallagher-Iba Arena (3,074); Stillwater, OK
02/08/2017; 7:00 pm		at Kansas	L 49–67	13–10 (3–9)	Allen Fieldhouse (2,376); Lawrence, KS
02/11/2017; 5:30 pm		at West Virginia	L 53–79	13–11 (3–10)	WVU Coliseum (4,024); Morgantown, WV
02/15/2017; 6:00 pm, FSOK		TCU	W 88–70	14–11 (4–10)	Gallagher-Iba Arena (1,906); Stillwater, OK
02/18/2017; 5:00 pm, FSSW+		at No. 4 Baylor	L 67–89	14–12 (4–11)	Ferrell Center (6,477); Waco, TX
02/22/2017; 7:00 pm, FSOK		Texas Tech	W 75–62	15–12 (5–11)	Gallagher-Iba Arena (1,783); Stillwater, OK
02/25/2017; 5:00 pm		West Virginia	W 67–63	16–12 (6–11)	Gallagher-Iba Arena (1,884); Stillwater, OK
02/27/2016; 7:00 pm		at Iowa State	L 48–61	16–13 (6–12)	Hilton Coliseum (10,334); Ames, IA
Big 12 Women's Tournament
03/03/2017; 8:30 pm, FCS		vs. Kansas; First Round	W 79–75	17–13	Chesapeake Energy Arena (3,267); Oklahoma City, OK
03/04/2017; 7:00 pm, FSN		vs. No. 12 Texas; Quarterfinals	L 60–71	17–14	Chesapeake Energy Arena; Oklahoma City, OK
WNIT
03/16/2017*; 7:00 pm		Abilene Christian; First Round	L 56–66	17–15	Gallagher-Iba Arena (1,423); Stillwater, OK
*Non-conference game. ^{#}Rankings from AP Poll. (#) Tournament seedings in parentheses. All times are in Central Time.

== Rankings ==
2016–17 NCAA Division I women's basketball rankings

Regular season polls
Poll	Pre- Season	Week 2	Week 3	Week 4	Week 5	Week 6	Week 7	Week 8	Week 9	Week 10	Week 11	Week 12	Week 13	Week 14	Week 15	Week 16	Week 17	Week 18	Week 19	Final
AP	NR	NR	NR	RV	RV	RV	RV	RV	RV	NR	NR	NR								
Coaches	RV	RV	RV	RV	RV	RV	RV	RV	RV	RV	RV	NR								

Legend
	Increase in ranking
	Decrease in ranking
	Not ranked previous week
(RV)	Received Votes

== See also ==
2016–17 Oklahoma State Cowboys basketball team
