= 2016–17 Oklahoma Sooners women's basketball team =

Intercollegiate basketball season

2016–17 Oklahoma Sooners women's basketball

NCAA Women's Tournament, second round
- Conference: Big 12

Ranking
- Coaches: No. 21
- AP: No. 23
- Record: 23–10 (13–5 Big 12)
- Head coach: Sherri Coale (21st season)
- Assistant coaches: Jan Ross; Pam DeCosta; Chad Thrailkill
- Home arena: Lloyd Noble Center

2016–17 Big 12 Conference women's basketball standings
	Conf.				Overall
Team	W		L	PCT	W		L	PCT
No. 5 Baylor	17	–	1	.944	33	–	4	.892
No. 14 Texas	15	–	3	.833	25	–	9	.735
No. 23 Oklahoma	13	–	5	.722	23	–	10	.697
No. 24 Kansas State	11	–	7	.611	23	–	11	.676
Iowa State	9	–	9	.500	18	–	13	.581
No. 22 West Virginia †	8	–	10	.444	24	–	11	.686
Oklahoma State	6	–	12	.333	17	–	15	.531
Texas Tech	5	–	13	.278	14	–	17	.452
TCU	4	–	14	.222	12	–	18	.400
Kansas	2	–	16	.111	8	–	22	.267
† 2017 Big 12 tournament winner Rankings from AP poll

The 2016–17 Oklahoma Sooners women's basketball team represented the University of Oklahoma in the 2016–17 NCAA Division I women's basketball season. The Sooners were led by Sherri Coale in her twenty-first season. The team played its home games at the Lloyd Noble Center in Norman, Oklahoma as a member of the Big 12 Conference. They finished the season 23–10, 13–5 in Big 12 play to finish in third place. They lost in the quarterfinals of the Big 12 women's tournament, to West Virginia. They received an at-large bid to the NCAA women's tournament, where they defeated Gonzaga in the first round before losing to Washington in the second round.

== Roster ==
2016–17 Oklahoma Sooners women's basketball team
Players
Coaches

Pos.	#	Name	Height	Year	Previous school	Hometown
C	0	Vionise Pierre-Louise	6 ft 4 in (1.93 m)	Jr	Grandview Prep	Lake Worth, FL
G	1	LaNesia Williams	5 ft 7 in (1.7 m)	Jr	Northeast Academy	Oklahoma City, OK
G	2	T'ona Edwards	5 ft 5 in (1.65 m)	Sr	Northeast Academy	Spencer, OK
G	3	Derica Wyatt	5 ft 10 in (1.78 m)	Sr	Franklin Road Academy	Brentwood, TN
G	10	Peyton Little	5 ft 11 in (1.8 m)	RS Sr	Wylie; Texas A&M	Abilene, TX
G	11	Morgan Rich	5 ft 10 in (1.78 m)	RS Fr	Allen County Scottsville; Kentucky	Scottsville, KY
G	12	Gileysa Penzo	5 ft 9 in (1.75 m)	RS So	Montverde Academy	Guaynabo, Puerto Rico
G	20	Chelsea Dungee	5 ft 11 in (1.8 m)	Fr	Sapulpa	Sapulpa, OK
G	21	Gabbi Ortiz	5 ft 9 in (1.75 m)	Jr	The Prairie School	Racine, WI
F	22	Shaya Kellogg	6 ft 2 in (1.88 m)	Sr	Ames	Ames, IA
G	23	Maddie Manning	6 ft 2 in (1.88 m)	RS Sr	Ankeny	Ankeny, IA
F	24	Ijeoma Odimgbe	6 ft 4 in (1.93 m)	So	Johnson	Savannah, GA
G	25	Gioya Carter	5 ft 9 in (1.75 m)	Sr	Carl Albert	Midwest City, OK
C	30	McKeena Treece	6 ft 4 in (1.93 m)	Jr	Incarnate Word Academy	St. Peters, MO
C	32	Nancy Mulkey	6 ft 9 in (2.06 m)	Fr	Cypress Woods	Cypress, TX

Head coach

- Sherri Coale (Oklahoma Christian)

Assistant coach(es)

- Jan Ross (Oklahoma Christian)
- Pam DeCosta (Metro State)
- Chad Thrailkill (Southern Nazarene)

Legend

- (C) Team captain
- (S) Suspended
- (I) Ineligible
- (W) Walk-on
- Injured
- Current redshirt

Roster

== Schedule ==
Date time, TV	Rank^{#}	Opponent^{#}	Result	Record	Site (attendance) city, state
Exhibition
11/02/2016*; 7:00 pm, FSOK	No. 16	Midwestern State	W 110–47		Lloyd Noble Center (3,157); Norman, OK
11/07/2016*; 7:00 pm, FSOK+	No. 16	Oklahoma City	W 68–48		Lloyd Noble Center (3,245); Norman, OK
Non-conference regular season
11/13/2016*; 12:30 pm, FSOK	No. 16	Southern Illinois	W 80–48	1–0	Lloyd Noble Center (3,223); Norman, OK
11/16/2016*; 7:00 pm, SSTV	No. 16	Little Rock	W 68–58	2–0	Lloyd Noble Center (3,084); Norman, OK
11/19/2016*; 5:00 pm, TheW.tv	No. 16	at BYU	W 68–61	3–0	Marriott Center (1,236); Provo, UT
11/23/2016*; 7:00 pm, FSOK	No. 13	South Dakota State	W 74–60	4–0	Lloyd Noble Center (2,453); Norman, OK
11/27/2016*; 2:00 pm, FSOK	No. 13	Colorado State	W 70–55	5–0	Lloyd Noble Center (3,245); Norman, OK
12/01/2016*; 6:00 pm, SECN	No. 12	at No. 17 Kentucky; Big 12/SEC Women's Challenge	L 68–82	5–1	Memorial Coliseum (4,400); Lexington, KY
12/04/2016*; 2:00 pm, FSOK	No. 12	Oral Roberts	L 67–74	5–2	Lloyd Noble Center (3,855); Norman, OK
12/08/2016*; 7:00 pm, FSOK	No. 19	Texas–Rio Grande Valley	W 92–59	6–2	Lloyd Noble Center (3,120); Norman, OK
12/11/2016*; 2:00 pm, FSOK	No. 19	Tulsa	W 85–68	7–2	Lloyd Noble Center (3,703); Norman, OK
12/19/2016*; 4:15 pm	No. 20	vs. Xavier; Puerto Rico Classic	W 81–69	8–2	South Point Arena; Enterprise, NV
12/20/2016*; 8:45 pm	No. 20	vs. California; Puerto Rico Classic	L 74–82	8–3	South Point Arena (185); Enterprise, NV
12/21/2016*; 9:00 pm	No. 20	vs. Portland State; Puerto Rico Classic	W 74–60	9–3	South Point Arena (90); Enterprise, NV
Big 12 regular season
12/29/2016; 7:00 pm, ESPN3	No. 24	at Kansas	W 84–54	10–3 (1–0)	Allen Fieldhouse (2,574); Lawerence, KS
01/01/2017; 2:00 pm, FSOK	No. 24	TCU	W 87–72	11–3 (2–0)	Lloyd Noble Center (3,673); Norman, OK
01/04/2017; 7:00 pm, FCS Central	No. 20	No. 25 Kansas State	W 85–80 ^{OT}	12–3 (3–0)	Lloyd Noble Center (3,194); Norman, OK
01/08/2017; 3:00 pm, FS1	No. 20	at No. 17 West Virginia	L 73–83	12–4 (3–1)	WVU Coliseum (2,563); Morgantown, VA
01/11/2017; 7:00 pm	No. 22	at Iowa State	W 67–57	13–4 (4–1)	Hilton Coliseum (10,043); Ames, IA
01/14/2017; 2:00 pm, FSOK	No. 22	Texas Tech	W 66–45	14–4 (5–1)	Lloyd Noble Center (3,566); Norman, OK
01/17/2017; 6:00 pm, FS1	No. 20	at No. 12 Texas	L 68–86	14–5 (5–2)	Frank Erwin Center (3,259); Austin, TX
01/22/2017; 2:00 pm, FSOK	No. 20	Oklahoma State; Bedlam Series	W 68–62	15–5 (6–2)	Lloyd Noble Center (6,543); Norman, OK
01/25/2017; 7:00 pm, FCS	No. 20	Iowa State	W 78–63	16–5 (7–2)	Lloyd Noble Center (3,353); Norman, OK
01/29/2017; 5:00 pm, ESPN2	No. 20	at No. 2 Baylor	L 58–92	16–6 (7–3)	Ferrell Center (6,632); Waco, TX
02/01/2017; 10:30 am, FSOK	No. 18	Kansas	W 89–52	17–6 (8–3)	Lloyd Noble Center; Norman, OK
02/04/2017; 12:00 pm, FSN	No. 18	at Oklahoma State; Bedlam Series	W 66–60	18–6 (9–3)	Gallagher-Iba Arena (3,074); Stillwater, OK
02/07/2017; 7:00 pm, FSOK	No. 19	No. 22 West Virginia	W 90–87 ^{2OT}	19–6 (10–3)	Lloyd Noble Center (4,890); Norman, OK
02/11/2017; 6:30 pm, FSSW+	No. 19	at Texas Tech	W 64–56	20–6 (11–3)	United Supermarkets Arena (4,239); Lubbock, TX
02/18/2017; 1:00 pm, FSN	No. 19	No. 8 Texas	W 74–73	21–6 (12–3)	Lloyd Noble Center (6,038); Norman, OK
02/21/2017; 7:00 pm, FCS	No. 16	at Kansas State	L 71–79	21–7 (12–4)	Bramlage Coliseum (4,377); Manhattan, KS
02/25/2017; 7:00 pm, FSSW+	No. 16	at TCU	W 73–64	22–7 (13–4)	Schollmaier Arena (2,377); Fort Worth, TX
02/27/2017; 7:00 pm, FS1	No. 19	No. 2 Baylor	L 64–103	22–8 (13–5)	Lloyd Noble Center (4,804); Norman, OK
Big 12 Women's Tournament
03/04/2017; 8:30 pm, FSN	(3) No. 19	vs. (6) West Virginia; Quarterfinals	L 58–82	22–9	Chesapeake Energy Arena (3,852); Oklahoma City, OK
NCAA tournament
03/18/2017*; 5:30 pm, ESPN2	(6 O) No. 23	vs. (11 O) Gonzaga; First Round	W 75–62	23–9	Alaska Airlines Arena; Seattle, WA
03/20/2017*; 8:00 pm, ESPN2	(6 O) No. 23	at (3 O) No. 11 Washington; Second Round	L 82–108	23–10	Alaska Airlines Arena (7,579); Seattle, WA
*Non-conference game. ^{#}Rankings from AP Poll. (#) Tournament seedings in parentheses. O=Oklahoma Region. All times are in Central Time.

x- Sooner Sports Television (SSTV) is aired locally on Fox Sports. However the contract allows games to air on various affiliates. Those affiliates are FSSW, FSSW+, FSOK, FSOK+, and FCS Atlantic, Central, and Pacific.

== Rankings ==
Regular season polls
Poll	Pre- season	Week 2	Week 3	Week 4	Week 5	Week 6	Week 7	Week 8	Week 9	Week 10	Week 11	Week 12	Week 13	Week 14	Week 15	Week 16	Week 17	Week 18	Week 19	Final
AP	16	16	13	12	19	20	20	24	20т	22	20	20	18	19	19	16	19	20	23	N/A
Coaches	18	17	12	12	20	22	21	24	24	25	20	20	22	20	19	16	19	22	20	21

Legend
	Increase in ranking
	Decrease in ranking
	No change
(RV)	Received votes
(NR)	Not ranked

== See also ==
- 2016–17 Oklahoma Sooners men's basketball team
