= 2016–17 Texas Longhorns women's basketball team =

Intercollegiate basketball season

2016–17 Texas Longhorns women's basketball

NCAA tournament, Sweet Sixteen
- Conference: Big 12 Conference

Ranking
- Coaches: No. 14
- AP: No. 14
- Record: 25–9 (15–3 Big 12)
- Head coach: Karen Aston (5th season)
- Assistant coaches: Jamie Carey; George Washington; Tina Thompson
- Home arena: Frank Erwin Center

2016–17 Big 12 Conference women's basketball standings
	Conf.				Overall
Team	W		L	PCT	W		L	PCT
No. 5 Baylor	17	–	1	.944	33	–	4	.892
No. 14 Texas	15	–	3	.833	25	–	9	.735
No. 23 Oklahoma	13	–	5	.722	23	–	10	.697
No. 24 Kansas State	11	–	7	.611	23	–	11	.676
Iowa State	9	–	9	.500	18	–	13	.581
No. 22 West Virginia †	8	–	10	.444	24	–	11	.686
Oklahoma State	6	–	12	.333	17	–	15	.531
Texas Tech	5	–	13	.278	14	–	17	.452
TCU	4	–	14	.222	12	–	18	.400
Kansas	2	–	16	.111	8	–	22	.267
† 2017 Big 12 tournament winner Rankings from AP poll

The 2016–17 Texas Longhorns women's basketball team represented the University of Texas at Austin in the 2016–17 NCAA Division I women's basketball season. It was head coach Karen Aston's fifth season at Texas. The Longhorns were members of the Big 12 Conference and played their home games at the Frank Erwin Center. They finished the season 25–9, 15–3 in Big 12 play to finish in second place. They advanced to the semifinals of the Big 12 women's basketball tournament, where they lost to West Virginia. They received an at-large bid to the NCAA women's basketball tournament, where they defeated Central Arkansas and NC State in the first and second rounds before losing to Stanford in the sweet sixteen.

== Roster ==
2016–17 Texas Longhorns women's basketball team
Players
Coaches

Pos.	#	Name	Height	Year	Previous school	Hometown
G	1	Alecia Sutton	5 ft 8 in (1.73 m)	Fr	Parkway North	St. Louis, MO
F	5	Jordan Hosey	6 ft 1 in (1.85 m)	So	Manvel	Pearland, TX
G	10	Lashann Higgs	5 ft 9 in (1.75 m)	So	Cedar Ridge	Round Rock, TX
G	11	Brooke McCarty	5 ft 4 in (1.63 m)	Jr	Clear Springs	League City, TX
G/F	12	Jada Underwood	6 ft 0 in (1.83 m)	Fr	Horn	Mesquite, TX
F	14	Christina Aborowa	6 ft 3 in (1.91 m)	So	Neumann-Goretti	Ondo, Nigeria
G	20	Brianna Taylor	5 ft 9 in (1.75 m)	Sr	Spring Dekaney	Houston, TX
G	22	Tasia Forman	5 ft 4 in (1.63 m)	Jr	Duncanville	Duncanville, TX
G	23	Ariel Atkins	5 ft 11 in (1.8 m)	Jr	Duncanville	Duncanville, TX
G/F	24	Joyner Holmes	6 ft 3 in (1.91 m)	Fr	Cedar Hill	Cedar Hill, TX
F	30	Khaléann Caron-Goudreau	6 ft 2 in (1.88 m)	RS So	IMG Academy; Vanderbilt	Gatineau, QE
F	31	Audrey-Ann Caron-Goudreau	6 ft 4 in (1.93 m)	So	IMG Academy; Gulf Coast State College	Gatineau, QE
C	40	Kelsey Lang	6 ft 5 in (1.96 m)	Sr	The Woodlands	The Woodlands, TX
F/C		Jatarie White (I) (redshirt)	6 ft 4 in (1.93 m)	Jr	Providence Day; South Carolina	Charlotte, NC

Head coach

- Karen Aston (Little Rock)

Assistant coach(es)

- Jamie Carey (Stanford)
- George Washington (Abilene Christian)
- Tina Thompson (USC)

Legend

- (C) Team captain
- (S) Suspended
- (I) Ineligible
- (W) Walk-on
- Injured
- Current redshirt

Roster

== Rankings ==
Regular season polls
Poll	Pre- season	Week 2	Week 3	Week 4	Week 5	Week 6	Week 7	Week 8	Week 9	Week 10	Week 11	Week 12	Week 13	Week 14	Week 15	Week 16	Week 17	Week 18	Week 19	Final
AP	8	8	14	14	17	16	16	16	15	16	12	12	12	11	8	6	12	14	14	N/A
Coaches	6т	10	14	15	17	17	17	16	17	17	14	13	13	10	8	10	14	15	15	14

Legend
	Increase in ranking
	Decrease in ranking
	No change
(RV)	Received votes
(NR)	Not ranked

== 2016–17 media ==
=== Television and radio information ===
Most University of Texas home games were shown on the Longhorn Network, with national telecasts on the Big 12 Conference's television partners. On the radio, women's basketball games aired on KTXX-HD4 "105.3 The Bat", with select games on KTXX-FM 104.9.

== Schedule ==
Date time, TV	Rank^{#}	Opponent^{#}	Result	Record	Site (attendance) city, state
Exhibition
11/06/2016*; 2:00 pm, LHN	No. 8	Tarleton State	W 93–43		Gregory Gymnasium (1,258); Austin, TX
Regular season
11/14/2016*; 7:00 pm, ESPN2	No. 8	at No. 11 Stanford; College Hoops Tip-Off Marathon	L 59–71	0–1	Maples Pavilion (2,447); Stanford, CA
11/16/2016*; 11:00 am, LHN	No. 8	Houston Baptist	W 98–46	1–1	Frank Erwin Center (6,378); Austin, TX
11/20/2016*; 5:00 pm, SECN	No. 8	at No. 10 Mississippi State	L 68–79	1–2	Humphrey Coliseum (7,764); Starkville, MS
11/23/2016*; 7:00 pm, LHN	No. 14	Northwestern State	W 86–39	2–2	Frank Erwin Center (2,756); Austin, TX
12/01/2016*; 6:00 pm, ESPN2	No. 14	No. 3 South Carolina; Big 12/SEC Women's Challenge	L 67–76	2–3	Frank Erwin Center (3,330); Austin, TX
12/04/2016*; 3:00 pm, ESPN	No. 14	vs. No. 2 Connecticut; Jimmy V Classic	L 54–72	2–4	Mohegan Sun Arena (9,014); Uncasville, CT
12/11/2016*; 3:30 pm, FS1	No. 17	Tennessee	W 72–67	3–4	Frank Erwin Center (4,386); Austin, TX
12/15/2016*; 7:00 pm, LHN	No. 16	Texas–Rio Grande Valley	W 85–61	4–4	Frank Erwin Center (2,496); Austin, TX
12/17/2016*; 5:00 pm, LHN	No. 16	UTSA	W 85–61	5–4	Frank Erwin Center (2,962); Austin, TX
12/20/2016*; 7:00 pm, LHN	No. 16	New Orleans	W 80–48	6–4	Frank Erwin Center (2,567); Austin, TX
12/29/2016; 7:00 pm, LHN	No. 16	Texas Tech	W 67–47	7–4 (1–0)	Frank Erwin Center (4,093); Austin, TX
01/01/2017; 12:00 pm, FSN	No. 16	at Iowa State	W 75–68	8–4 (2–0)	Hilton Coliseum (7,915); Ames, IA
01/04/2017; 7:00 pm, ESPN3	No. 15	at Kansas	W 66–54	9–4 (3–0)	Allen Fieldhouse (1,817); Lawrence, KS
01/07/2017; 6:00 pm, LHN	No. 15	TCU	W 83–54	10–4 (4–0)	Frank Erwin Center (3,864); Austin, TX
01/10/2017; 7:00 pm, LHN	No. 16	Oklahoma State	W 66–35	11–4 (5–0)	Frank Erwin Center (2,624); Austin, TX
01/14/2017; 3:00 pm	No. 16	at No. 18 West Virginia	W 73–63	12–4 (6–0)	WVU Coliseum (4,118); Morgantown, WV
01/17/2017; 6:00 pm, FS1	No. 12	No. 20 Oklahoma	W 86–68	13–4 (7–0)	Frank Erwin Center (3,259); Austin, TX
01/21/2017; 6:00 pm	No. 12	at Texas Tech	W 77–57	14–4 (8–0)	United Supermarkets Arena (5,236); Lubbock, TX
01/25/2017; 8:00 pm, FSSW+	No. 12	at TCU	W 77–69	15–4 (9–0)	Schollmaier Arena (2,230); Fort Worth, TX
01/29/2017; 3:00 pm, FS1	No. 12	No. 22 West Virginia	W 69–54	16–4 (10–0)	Frank Erwin Center (4,123); Austin, TX
02/01/2017; 7:00 pm, FSOK	No. 12	at Oklahoma State	W 85–71	17–4 (11–0)	Gallagher-Iba Arena (1,846); Stillwater, OK
02/04/2017; 7:00 pm, LHN	No. 12	Kansas State	W 63–58	18–4 (12–0)	Frank Erwin Center (3,781); Austin, TX
02/06/2017; 7:00 pm, FS1	No. 10	at No. 2 Baylor	W 85–79	19–4 (13–0)	Ferrell Center (7,054); Waco, TX
02/11/2017; 1:30 pm, LHN	No. 10	Kansas	W 75–42	20–4 (14–0)	Frank Erwin Center (3,974); Austin, TX
02/13/2017*; 6:00 pm, ESPN2	No. 8	at No. 4 Florida State	W 92–88 ^{2OT}	21–4	Donald L. Tucker Center (3,621); Tallahassee, FL
02/18/2017; 1:00 pm, FSN	No. 8	at No. 19 Oklahoma	L 73–74	21–5 (14–1)	Lloyd Noble Center (6,038); Norman, OK
02/20/2017; 8:00 pm, ESPN2	No. 6	No. 4 Baylor	L 67–70	21–6 (14–2)	Frank Erwin Center (7,103); Austin, TX
02/24/2017; 7:30 pm, LHN	No. 6	Iowa State	L 66–70	21–7 (14–3)	Frank Erwin Center (4,555); Austin, TX
02/27/2017; 7:00 pm, ESPN3	No. 12	at No. 24 Kansas State	W 69–61	22–7 (15–3)	Bramlage Coliseum (4,541); Manhattan, KS
Big 12 Women's Tournament
03/04/2017; 6:00 pm, FSN	(2) No. 12	vs. (7) Oklahoma State; Quarterfinals	W 71–60	23–7	Chesapeake Energy Arena; Oklahoma City, OK
03/05/2017; 4:00 pm, FS1	(2) No. 12	vs. (6) West Virginia; Semifinals	L 59–62	23–8	Chesapeake Energy Arena (3,475); Oklahoma City, OK
NCAA Women's Tournament
03/17/2017*; 1:30 pm, ESPN2	(3 L) No. 14	(14 L) Central Arkansas; First Round	W 78–50	24–8	Frank Erwin Center (2,908); Austin, TX
03/19/2017*; 1:30 pm, ESPN2	(3 L) No. 14	(6 L) No. 14 NC State; Second Round	W 84–80	25–8	Frank Erwin Center (3,476); Austin, TX
03/24/2017*; 8:00 pm, ESPN	(3 L) No. 14	vs. (2 L) No. 15 Stanford; Sweet Sixteen	L 66–77	25–9	Rupp Arena (3,163); Lexington, KY
*Non-conference game. ^{#}Rankings from AP Poll. (#) Tournament seedings in parentheses. L=Lexington Region. All times are in Central Time.

== See also ==
- 2016–17 Texas Longhorns men's basketball team
