= 2016–17 Kansas Jayhawks women's basketball team =

Intercollegiate basketball season

2016–17 Kansas Jayhawks women's basketball
- Conference: Big 12 Conference
- Record: 8–22 (2–16 Big 12)
- Head coach: Brandon Schneider (2nd season)
- Assistant coaches: Aqua Franklin; Katie O'Connor; Damitria Buchanan
- Home arena: Allen Fieldhouse

2016–17 Big 12 Conference women's basketball standings
	Conf.				Overall
Team	W		L	PCT	W		L	PCT
No. 5 Baylor	17	–	1	.944	33	–	4	.892
No. 14 Texas	15	–	3	.833	25	–	9	.735
No. 23 Oklahoma	13	–	5	.722	23	–	10	.697
No. 24 Kansas State	11	–	7	.611	23	–	11	.676
Iowa State	9	–	9	.500	18	–	13	.581
No. 22 West Virginia †	8	–	10	.444	24	–	11	.686
Oklahoma State	6	–	12	.333	17	–	15	.531
Texas Tech	5	–	13	.278	14	–	17	.452
TCU	4	–	14	.222	12	–	18	.400
Kansas	2	–	16	.111	8	–	22	.267
† 2017 Big 12 tournament winner Rankings from AP poll

The 2016–17 Kansas Jayhawks women's basketball team represented the University of Kansas in the 2016–17 NCAA Division I women's basketball season. The Jayhawks were led by second year head coach Brandon Schneider. They played their home games at Allen Fieldhouse in Lawrence, Kansas and were members of the Big 12 Conference. They finished the season 8–22, 2–16 in Big 12 play to finish in last place. They lost in the first round of the Big 12 women's tournament to Oklahoma State.

== Roster ==
2016–17 Kansas Jayhawks women's basketball team
Players
Coaches

Pos.	#	Name	Height	Year	Previous school	Hometown
F	0	Sydney Umeri	6 ft 0 in (1.83 m)	Fr	Lovett School	Acworth, GA
C	1	Chelsea Lott	6 ft 3 in (1.91 m)	So	Fort Bend Hightower	Fresno, TX
G	2	McKenzie Calvert	5 ft 9 in (1.75 m)	RS So	Byron P. Steele; USC	Schertz, TX
G	3	Jessica Washington	5 ft 8 in (1.73 m)	RS Jr	Jenks; North Carolina	Tulsa, OK
F	4	Jada Brown	6 ft 0 in (1.83 m)	Sr	Centennial	Las Vegas, NV
G	12	Timeka O'Neal	5 ft 4 in (1.63 m)	RS Sr	Raytown	Raytown, MO
G	15	Aisia Robertson	5 ft 7 in (1.7 m)	So	Bishop O'Dowd	San Francisco, CA
G	20	Jayde Christopher	5 ft 8 in (1.73 m)	So	Cleveland	Federal Way, WA
C	21	Lisa Blair	6 ft 5 in (1.96 m)	Fr	Nazareth Regional	Brooklyn, NY
G	22	Chayla Cheadle	5 ft 11 in (1.8 m)	Jr	Rock Bridge	Columbia, MO
G	23	Eboni Watts	5 ft 6 in (1.68 m)	Fr	Rutland	Macon, GA
G	24	Sydney Benoit	5 ft 10 in (1.78 m)	Sr	Smith Center; Hutchinson CC	Smith Center, KS
F	25	Caelynn Manning-Allen	6 ft 4 in (1.93 m)	Sr	Curie	Chicago, IL
G	33	Kylee Kopatich	5 ft 10 in (1.78 m)	So	Olathe South	Olathe, KS
F	55	Tyler Johnson	6 ft 2 in (1.88 m)	So	Leavenworth	Leavenworth, KS

Head coach

- Brandon Schneider (Wayland Baptist)

Assistant coach(es)

- Aqua Franklin (Texas A&M)
- Katie O'Connor (Virginia Tech)
- Steve Wallace (Texas A&M)

Legend

- (C) Team captain
- (S) Suspended
- (I) Ineligible
- (W) Walk-on
- Injured
- Current redshirt

Roster

== Schedule and results ==
Date time, TV	Rank^{#}	Opponent^{#}	Result	Record	Site (attendance) city, state
Exhibition
10/30/2016*; 2:00 pm, JTV/ESPN3		Fort Hays State	W 98–71		Allen Fieldhouse (2,412); Lawrence, KS
11/06/2016*; 1:00 pm, JTV/ESPN3		Washburn	W 81–57		Allen Fieldhouse (2,103); Lawrence, KS
Non-conference regular season
11/13/2016*; 2:00 pm, JTV/ESPN3		Missouri State	L 64–87	0–1	Allen Fieldhouse (2,277); Lawrence, KS
11/16/2016*; 7:00 pm, JTV/ESPN3		SMU	L 63–75	0–2	Allen Fieldhouse (1,714); Lawrence, KS
11/20/2016*; 2:00 pm		at Memphis	W 68–58	1–2	Elma Roane Fieldhouse (831); Memphis, TN
11/23/2016*; 6:00 pm, JTV/ESPN3		Oral Roberts	W 64–56 ^{2OT}	2–2	Allen Fieldhouse (1,963); Lawrence, KS
11/27/2016*; 2:00 pm, JTV/ESPN3		North Dakota	W 76–71 ^{OT}	3–2	Allen Fieldhouse (1,992); Lawrence, KS
11/30/2016*; 7:00 pm		at Creighton	L 49–69	3–3	D. J. Sokol Arena (1,008); Omaha, NE
12/04/2016*; 11:00 am, SECN		at Alabama; Big 12/SEC Women's Challenge	L 65–71 ^{OT}	3–4	Coleman Coliseum (1,176); Tuscaloosa, AL
12/07/2016*; 7:00 pm, JTV/ESPN3		Harvard	W 69–59	3–5	Allen Fieldhouse (1,679); Lawrence, KS
12/11/2016*; 2:00 pm, JTV/ESPN3		Rhode Island	W 72–36	4–5	Allen Fieldhouse (1,995); Lawrence, KS
12/17/2016*; 12:00 pm, JTV/ESPN3		Arizona	W 75–51	5–5	Allen Fieldhouse (1,884); Lawrence, KS
12/21/2016*; 7:00 pm, JTV/ESPN3		UC Riverside	W 90–84 ^{OT}	6–5	Allen Fieldhouse (1,910); Lawrence, KS
Big 12 regular season
12/29/2016; 7:00 pm, JTV/ESPN3		No. 24 Oklahoma	L 54–84	6–6 (0–1)	Allen Fieldhouse (2,574); Lawrence, KS
01/01/2017; 2:00 pm, FSSW		at No. 3 Baylor	L 43–90	6–7 (0–2)	Ferrell Center (6,501); Waco, TX
01/04/2017; 7:00 pm, JTV/ESPN3		No. 15 Texas	L 54–66	6–8 (0–3)	Allen Fieldhouse (1,817); Lawrence, KS
01/08/2017; 1:00 pm, ESPNU		at Iowa State	L 58–87	6–9 (0–4)	Hilton Coliseum (7,573); Ames, IA
01/11/2017; 7:00 pm, COX/ESPN3		at No. 25 Kansas State; Sunflower Showdown	L 60–73	6–10 (0–5)	Bramlage Coliseum (4,768); Manhattan, KS
01/15/2017; 1:00 pm, ESPNU		No. 2 Baylor	L 43–92	6–11 (0–6)	Allen Fieldhouse (2,655); Lawrence, KS
01/18/2017; 7:00 pm, JTV/ESPN3		No. 24 West Virginia	L 51–62	6–12 (0–7)	Allen Fieldhouse (1,833); Lawrence, KS
01/22/2017; 6:00 pm, FSSW		at TCU	L 68–83	6–13 (0–8)	Schollmaier Arena (1,998); Fort Worth, TX
01/25/2017; 7:00 pm, FSOK+		at Oklahoma State	L 70–74	6–14 (0–9)	Gallagher-Iba Arena (1,865); Stillwater, OK
01/28/2017; 11:00 am, FSN		Texas Tech	W 66–60	7–14 (1–9)	Allen Fieldhouse (2,047); Lawrence, KS
02/01/2017; 10:30 am		at No. 18 Oklahoma	L 52–89	7–15 (1–10)	Lloyd Noble Center; Norman, OK
02/05/2017; 1:30 pm, JTV/ESPN3		TCU	L 68–80	7–16 (1–11)	Allen Fieldhouse (3,823); Lawrence, KS
02/08/2017; 7:00 pm, JTV/ESPN3		Oklahoma State	W 67–49	8–16 (2–11)	Allen Fieldhouse (2,376); Lawrence, KS
02/11/2017; 1:30 pm, LHN		at No. 11 Texas	L 42–75	8–17 (2–12)	Frank Erwin Center (3,974); Austin, TX
02/18/2017; 2:00 pm, FSSW+		at Texas Tech	L 60–75	8–18 (2–13)	United Supermarkets Arena (4,765); Lubbock, TX
02/21/2017; 7:00 pm, JTV/ESPN3		Iowa State	L 75–90	8–19 (2–14)	Allen Fieldhouse (2,043); Lawrence, KS
02/25/2017; 2:00 pm, JTV/ESPN3		Kansas State; Sunflower Showdown	L 54–61	8–20 (2–15)	Allen Fieldhouse (4,449); Lawrence, KS
02/27/2017; 6:00 pm		at West Virginia	L 54–73	8–21 (2–16)	WVU Coliseum (2,661); Morgantown, WV
Big 12 Women's Tournament
03/03/2017; 8:30 pm, FCS		vs. Oklahoma State; First Round	L 75–79	8–22	Chesapeake Energy Arena (3,267); Oklahoma City, OK
*Non-conference game. ^{#}Rankings from AP Poll / Coaches' Poll. (#) Tournament seedings in parentheses. All times are in Central Time.

x- All JTV games will air on Metro Sports, ESPN3 and local affiliates.

== See also ==
- 2016–17 Kansas Jayhawks men's basketball team
