= 2016–17 Kansas State Wildcats women's basketball team =

Intercollegiate basketball season

2016–17 Kansas State Wildcats women's basketball

Paradise Jam Island Division Champions

NCAA Women's tournament, second round
- Conference: Big 12 Conference

Ranking
- AP: No. 24
- Record: 23–11 (11–7 Big 12)
- Head coach: Jeff Mittie (3rd season)
- Assistant coaches: Brian Ostermann; Ebony Gilliam; Jacie Hoyt-Capra
- Home arena: Bramlage Coliseum

2016–17 Big 12 Conference women's basketball standings
	Conf.				Overall
Team	W		L	PCT	W		L	PCT
No. 5 Baylor	17	–	1	.944	33	–	4	.892
No. 14 Texas	15	–	3	.833	25	–	9	.735
No. 23 Oklahoma	13	–	5	.722	23	–	10	.697
No. 24 Kansas State	11	–	7	.611	23	–	11	.676
Iowa State	9	–	9	.500	18	–	13	.581
No. 22 West Virginia †	8	–	10	.444	24	–	11	.686
Oklahoma State	6	–	12	.333	17	–	15	.531
Texas Tech	5	–	13	.278	14	–	17	.452
TCU	4	–	14	.222	12	–	18	.400
Kansas	2	–	16	.111	8	–	22	.267
† 2017 Big 12 tournament winner Rankings from AP poll

The 2016–17 Kansas State Wildcats women's basketball team represented Kansas State University in the 2016–17 NCAA Division I women's basketball season. The Wildcats, led by third-year head coach Jeff Mittie, played their home games at Bramlage Coliseum in Manhattan, Kansas and were members of the Big 12 Conference. They finished the season 23–11, 11–7 in Big 12 play to finish in fourth place. They advanced to the semifinals of the Big 12 women's tournament, where they lost to Baylor. They received an at-large bid to the NCAA women's tournament, where they defeated Drake in the first round before losing to Stanford in the second round.

== Roster ==
2016–17 Kansas State Wildcats women's basketball team
Players
Coaches

Pos.	#	Name	Height	Year	Previous school	Hometown
F	0	Jessica Sheble	6 ft 3 in (1.91 m)	Sr	Olathe North	Olathe, KS
G	1	Kaylee Page	6 ft 2 in (1.88 m)	Jr	Wamego; Nebraska	Wamego, KS
F	2	Erica Young	6 ft 1 in (1.85 m)	Sr	Tampa Bay Tech	Tampa, FL
F	3	Lanie Page	6 ft 3 in (1.91 m)	RS Fr	Wamego	Wamego, KS
G	5	Mercedes Brooks	6 ft 0 in (1.83 m)	Fr	S. H. Rider	Wichita Falls, TX
G	10	Kayla Goth	6 ft 1 in (1.85 m)	So	DeForest	DeForest, WI
F	11	Peyton Williams	6 ft 3 in (1.91 m)	Fr	Cair Paravel	Topeka, KS
G	12	Kelly Thomson	5 ft 9 in (1.75 m)	RS Sr	Riley County	Riley, KS
F	13	Eternati Willock	6 ft 2 in (1.88 m)	Fr	St. John Paul II Catholic	Scarborough, ON
G	21	Karyla Middlebrook	5 ft 7 in (1.7 m)	RS Jr	Blue Springs HS; Alabama	Blue Springs, MO
F	22	Breanna Lewis	6 ft 5 in (1.96 m)	Sr	Riverside	Milwaukee, WI
G	23	Anna Hammaker	5 ft 10 in (1.78 m)	So	Christian Academy	Knoxville, TN
G	24	Kindred Wesemann	5 ft 6 in (1.68 m)	Sr	Pleasant Hill	Pleasant Hill, MO
G	50	Shaelyn Martin	6 ft 0 in (1.83 m)	Jr	Salinas Central	Salina, KS

Head coach

- Jeff Mittie (Missouri Western)

Assistant coach(es)

- Brian Ostermann (UW–La Crosse)
- Ebony Gilliam (TCU)
- Jacie Hoyt-Capra (Wichita State)

Legend

- (C) Team captain
- (S) Suspended
- (I) Ineligible
- (W) Walk-on
- Injured
- Current redshirt

Roster

== Rankings ==
2016–17 NCAA Division I women's basketball rankings

Regular season polls
Poll	Pre- Season	Week 2	Week 3	Week 4	Week 5	Week 6	Week 7	Week 8	Week 9	Week 10	Week 11	Week 12	Week 13	Week 14	Week 15	Week 16	Week 17	Week 18	Week 19	Final
AP	NR	NR	NR	RV	RV	RV	24	RV	25	25	22	25	RV	25	24	RV	24	24	24	N/A
Coaches	NR	NR	NR	NR	RV	RV	RV	NR	RV	RV	RV	RV	RV	RV	RV	RV	RV	RV	RV	RV

Legend
	Increase in ranking
	Decrease in ranking
	Not ranked previous week
(RV)	Received Votes

== Schedule and results ==
Date time, TV	Rank^{#}	Opponent^{#}	Result	Record	Site (attendance) city, state
Exhibition
11/04/2016*; 5:30 pm, FCS Central		Washburn	W 66–31		Bramlage Coliseum (4,886); Manhattan, KS
11/07/2016*; 7:00 pm, Cox Kansas		Newman	W 100–33		Bramlage Coliseum (3,995); Manhattan, KS
Non-conference regular season
11/11/2016*; 5:30 pm		Chicago State	W 83–33	1–0	Bramlage Coliseum (4,851); Manhattan, KS
11/14/2016*; 7:00 pm, ESPN3		Tulsa	W 82–62	2–0	Bramlage Coliseum (4,094); Manhattan, KS
11/20/2016*; 1:00 pm, ESPN3		Lamar	W 68–43	3–0	Bramlage Coliseum (4,156); Manhattan, KS
11/24/2016*; 12:00 pm		vs. NC State; Paradise Jam tournament Island Division	W 67–50	4–0	Sports and Fitness Center; Saint Thomas, USVI
11/25/2016*; 12:00 pm		vs. LSU; Paradise Jam Tournament Island Division	W 69–54	5–0	Sports and Fitness Center; Saint Thomas, USVI
11/26/2016*; 2:15 pm		vs. UTEP; Paradise Jam Tournament Island Division	W 61–40	6–0	Sports and Fitness Center (242); Saint Thomas, USVI
12/02/2016*; 7:00 pm, Cox Kansas		No. 23 Auburn; Big 12/SEC Women's Challenge	W 71–66	7–0	Bramlage Coliseum (4,160); Manhattan, KS
12/04/2016*; 2:00 pm		at Nebraska–Omaha	W 70–57	8–0	Baxter Arena (663); Omaha, NE
12/07/2016*; 7:00 pm, FCS Pacific		Texas–Arlington	W 62–49	9–0	Bramlage Coliseum (4,050); Manhattan, KS
12/11/2016*; 1:00 pm, FS1		No. 1 UConn	L 58–75	9–1	Bramlage Coliseum (12,528); Manhattan, KS
12/18/2016*; 1:00 pm, ESPN3		Princeton	W 60–42	10–1	Bramlage Coliseum (4,193); Manhattan, KS
12/22/2016*; 7:00 pm	No. 24	at Northern Iowa	L 59–67	10–2	McLeod Center (1,402); Cedar Falls, IA
Big 12 regular season
12/29/2016; 7:00 pm, FSSW+		at No. 3 Baylor	L 57–87	10–3 (0–1)	Ferrell Center (7,087); Waco, TX
01/01/2017; 1:00 pm, Cox Kansas		No. 12 West Virginia	W 86–71	11–3 (1–1)	Bramlage Coliseum (4,825); Manhattan, KS
01/04/2017; 7:00 pm, FCS Central	No. 25	at No. 20 Oklahoma	L 80–85 ^{OT}	11–4 (1–2)	Lloyd Noble Center (3,194); Norman, OK
01/07/2017; 7:00 pm, ESPN3	No. 25	Texas Tech	W 68–54	12–4 (2–2)	Bramlage Coliseum (4,615); Manhattan, KS
01/11/2017; 7:00 pm, Cox Kansas/ESPN3	No. 25	Kansas; Sunflower Showdown	W 73–60	13–4 (3–2)	Bramlage Coliseum (4,768); Manhattan, KS
01/14/2017; 4:00 pm, FSOK	No. 25	at Oklahoma State	W 63–43	14–4 (4–2)	Gallagher-Iba Arena (1,957); Stillwater, OK
01/18/2017; 7:00 pm, FCS Pacific	No. 22	TCU	W 74–63	15–4 (5–2)	Bramlage Coliseum (4,735); Manhattan, KS
01/21/2017; 5:00 pm	No. 22	at Iowa State	L 69–75	15–5 (5–3)	Hilton Coliseum (11,673); Ames, IA
01/25/2017; 7:00 pm, Cox Kansas/ESPN3	No. 25	No. 2 Baylor	L 49–91	15–6 (5–4)	Bramlage Coliseum (4,488); Manhattan, KS
01/28/2017; 3:00 pm, FSN	No. 25	Oklahoma State	W 74–69	16–6 (6–4)	Bramlage Coliseum (6,000); Manhattan, KS
02/01/2017; 6:30 pm, FSSW+		at Texas Tech	W 65–53	17–6 (7–4)	United Supermarkets Arena (3,440); Lubbock, TX
02/04/2017; 7:00 pm, LHN		at No. 12 Texas	L 58–63	17–7 (7–5)	Frank Erwin Center (3,781); Austin, TX
02/11/2017; 1:00 pm, FSN	No. 25	Iowa State	W 80–68	18–7 (8–5)	Bramlage Coliseum (8,099); Manhattan, KS
02/15/2017; 6:00 pm	No. 24	at West Virginia	L 59–66	18–8 (8–6)	WVU Coliseum (1,642); Morgantown, WV
02/18/2017; 3:00 pm, FSN	No. 24	at TCU	W 68–65	19–8 (9–6)	Schollmaier Arena (2,042); Fort Worth, TX
02/21/2017; 7:00 pm, FCS Central		No. 16 Oklahoma	W 79–71	20–8 (10–6)	Bramlage Coliseum (4,377); Manhattan, KS
02/25/2017; 2:00 pm		at Kansas; Sunflower Showdown	W 61–54	21–8 (11–6)	Allen Fieldhouse (4,449); Lawrence, KS
02/27/2017; 7:00 pm, ESPN3	No. 24	No. 12 Texas	L 61–69	21–9 (11–7)	Bramlage Coliseum (4,543); Manhattan, KS
Big 12 Women's tournament
03/04/2017; 11:00 am, FSN	(4) No. 24	vs. (5) Iowa State; Quarterfinals	W 74–67	22–9	Chesapeake Energy Arena (3,420); Oklahoma City, OK
03/05/2017; 1:30 pm, FS1	(4) No. 24	vs. (1) No. 2 Baylor; Semifinals	L 71–88	22–10	Chesapeake Energy Arena; Oklahoma City, OK
NCAA Women's tournament
03/18/2017*; 3:00 pm, ESPN2	(7 L) No. 24	(10 L) No. 20 Drake; First Round	W 67–54	23–10	Bramlage Coliseum (4,005); Manhattan, KS
03/20/2017*; 5:30 pm, ESPN2	(7 L) No. 24	vs. (2 L) No. 6 Stanford; Second Round	L 48–69	23–11	Bramlage Coliseum (3,969); Manhattan, KS
*Non-conference game. ^{#}Rankings from AP Poll / Coaches' Poll. (#) Tournament seedings in parentheses. L=Lexington Region. All times are in Central Time.

== See also ==
- 2016–17 Kansas State Wildcats men's basketball team
