= 2016–17 TCU Horned Frogs women's basketball team =

Intercollegiate basketball season

2016–17 TCU Horned Frogs women's basketball
- Conference: Big 12 Conference
- Record: 12–18 (4–14 Big 12)
- Head coach: Raegan Pebley (3rd season)
- Assistant coaches: Hanna Howard; Edwina Brown; Aaron Kallhoff
- Home arena: Schollmaier Arena

2016–17 Big 12 Conference women's basketball standings
	Conf.				Overall
Team	W		L	PCT	W		L	PCT
No. 5 Baylor	17	–	1	.944	33	–	4	.892
No. 14 Texas	15	–	3	.833	25	–	9	.735
No. 23 Oklahoma	13	–	5	.722	23	–	10	.697
No. 24 Kansas State	11	–	7	.611	23	–	11	.676
Iowa State	9	–	9	.500	18	–	13	.581
No. 22 West Virginia †	8	–	10	.444	24	–	11	.686
Oklahoma State	6	–	12	.333	17	–	15	.531
Texas Tech	5	–	13	.278	14	–	17	.452
TCU	4	–	14	.222	12	–	18	.400
Kansas	2	–	16	.111	8	–	22	.267
† 2017 Big 12 tournament winner Rankings from AP poll

The 2016–17 TCU Horned Frogs women's basketball team represented Texas Christian University in the 2016–17 NCAA Division I women's basketball season. The 2016–17 season was head coach Raegan Pebley's third season at TCU. The Horned Frogs were members of the Big 12 Conference and played their home games in Schollmaier Arena. They finished the season 12–18, 4–14 in Big 12 play to finish in ninth place. They lost in the first round of the Big 12 women's tournament to Texas Tech.

== Roster ==
2016–17 TCU Horned Frogs women's basketball team
Players
Coaches

Pos.	#	Name	Height	Year	Previous school	Hometown
F	00	Amy Okonkwo	6 ft 2 in (1.88 m)	RS So	Etiwanda; USC	Fontana, CA
G	1	Toree Thompson	5 ft 10 in (1.78 m)	Jr	Broken Arrow; Ole Miss	Broken Arrow, OK
G	3	Mikayla Christian	5 ft 9 in (1.75 m)	Fr	Vista Ridge	Round Rock, TX
G	4	Amber Ramirez	5 ft 8 in (1.73 m)	Fr	Wagner	San Antonio, TX
G	10	Danielle Rainey	5 ft 8 in (1.73 m)	Fr	Vista Ridge	Round Rock, TX
G/F	15	Jada Butts	5 ft 8 in (1.73 m)	Sr	Lewisville	Lewisville, TX
F	21	Sydney Coleman	6 ft 1 in (1.85 m)	Jr	Cypress Ranch	Cypress, TX
C	22	Jordan Moore	6 ft 3 in (1.91 m)	So	Stony Point	Round Rock, TX
G	23	AJ Alix	5 ft 6 in (1.68 m)	RS Jr	Bellaire	Bellaire, TX
G	25	Kianna Ray	6 ft 1 in (1.85 m)	Fr	Bowie	Austin, TX
F	31	Ella Hellessey	6 ft 2 in (1.88 m)	Fr	Padua College	Dromana, Australia
F	33	Adeola Akomolafe	6 ft 3 in (1.91 m)	So	El Dorado	El Paso, TX
C	55	Carol Willie	6 ft 2 in (1.88 m)	Sr	Cypress	Houston, TX

Head coach

- Raegan Pebley (Colorado)

Assistant coach(es)

- Hanna Howard (Portland)
- Britney Brown (Oklahoma)
- Aaron Kallhoff (Bemidji State)

Legend

- (C) Team captain
- (S) Suspended
- (I) Ineligible
- (W) Walk-on
- Injured
- Current redshirt

Roster

== Schedule and results ==
Date time, TV	Rank^{#}	Opponent^{#}	Result	Record	Site (attendance) city, state
Exhibition
11/05/2016*; 2:00 pm		Texas A&M–Commerce	W 84–60		Schollmaier Arena (617); Fort Worth, TX
Non-Conference Games
11/11/2016*; 8:30 pm		Incarnate Word	W 88–40	1–0	Schollmaier Arena (1,674); Fort Worth, TX
11/15/2016*; 6:30 pm		Sam Houston State	W 81–37	2–0	Schollmaier Arena (1,529); Fort Worth, TX
11/19/2016*; 2:00 pm		SMU	W 76–67	3–0	Schollmaier Arena (1,841); Fort Worth, TX
11/22/2016*; 6:30 pm		Grambling State	W 83–47	4–0	Schollmaier Arena (1,563); Fort Worth, TX
11/26/2016*; 12:00 pm, ESPN3		at No. 1 Notre Dame	L 59–92	4–1	Edmund P. Joyce Center (8,174); South Bend, IN
11/30/2016*; 12:00 pm, FSN		Butler	W 73–47	5–1	Schollmaier Arena (3,769); Fort Worth, TX
12/04/2016*; 1:00 pm, SECN		at LSU; Big 12/SEC Women's Challenge	L 61–67	5–2	Maravich Center (1,809); Baton Rouge, LA
12/08/2016*; 7:30 pm, FS1		Texas A&M	L 67–75	5–3	Schollmaier Arena (2,058); Fort Worth, TX
12/11/2016*; 2:00 pm		McNeese State	W 74–70	6–3	Schollmaier Arena (2,399); Fort Worth, TX
12/18/2016*; 1:00 pm		Texas Southern	W 77–48	7–3	Schollmaier Arena (1,729); Fort Worth, TX
12/20/2016*; 6:30 pm		Alcorn State	W 95–39	8–3	Schollmaier Arena (1,566); Fort Worth, TX
Conference Games
12/29/2016; 6:30 pm		No. 12 West Virginia	L 61–83	8–4 (0–1)	Schollmaier Arena (1,770); Fort Worth, TX
01/01/2017; 2:00 pm, FSOK		at No. 24 Oklahoma	L 72–87	8–5 (0–2)	Lloyd Noble Center (3,673); Norman, OK
01/04/2017; 8:00 pm, FSSW+		Oklahoma State	L 67–82	8–6 (0–3)	Schollmaier Arena (1,628); Fort Worth, TX
01/07/2017; 6:00 pm, LHN		at No. 15 Texas	L 54–83	8–7 (0–4)	Frank Erwin Center (3,864); Austin, TX
01/11/2017; 7:00 pm, FSSW		at No. 2 Baylor	L 54–77	8–8 (0–5)	Ferrell Center (6,081); Waco, TX
01/15/2017; 12:00 pm, FSSW		Iowa State	W 80–75	9–8 (1–5)	Schollmaier Arena (1,949); Fort Worth, TX
01/18/2017; 7:00 pm, FCS		at No. 22 Kansas State	L 63–74	9–9 (1–6)	Bramlage Coliseum (4,735); Manhattan, KS
01/22/2017; 6:00 pm, FSSW		Kansas	W 83–68	10–9 (2–6)	Schollmaier Arena (1,998); Fort Worth, TX
01/25/2017; 8:00 pm, FSSW+		No. 12 Texas	L 69–77	10–10 (2–7)	Schollmaier Arena (2,230); Fort Worth, TX
01/28/2017; 12:00 pm		Iowa State	L 69–72	10–11 (2–8)	Hilton Coliseum (10,884); Ames, IA
02/05/2017; 1:30 pm, ESPN3		at Kansas	W 80–68	11–11 (3–8)	Allen Fieldhouse (3,823); Lawrence, KS
02/08/2017; 7:00 pm, FSSW		Texas Tech	W 76–62	12–11 (4–8)	Schollmaier Arena (2,396); Fort Worth, TX
02/12/2017; 2:00 pm, ESPN2		No. 2 Baylor	L 73–91	12–12 (4–9)	Schollmaier Arena (3,686); Fort Worth, TX
02/15/2017; 6:00 pm, FSOK		at Oklahoma State	L 70–88	12–13 (4–10)	Gallagher-Iba Arena (1,906); Stillwater, OK
02/18/2017; 3:00 pm, FSN		No. 24 Kansas State	L 65–68	12–14 (4–11)	Schollmaier Arena (2,042); Fort Worth, TX
02/22/2017; 6:00 pm		at West Virginia	L 73–77	12–15 (4–12)	WVU Coliseum (2,147); Morgantown, WV
02/25/2017; 7:00 pm, FSSW+		Oklahoma	L 64–73	12–16 (4–13)	Schollmaier Arena (2,377); Fort Worth, TX
02/27/2017; 7:00 pm, FSN		at Texas Tech	L 64–79	12–17 (4–14)	United Supermarkets Arena (3,784); Lubbock, TX
Big 12 Women's Tournament
03/03/2017; 6:00 pm, FCS	(9)	vs. (8) Texas Tech; First Round	L 58–76	12–18	Chesapeake Energy Arena; Oklahoma City, OK
*Non-conference game. ^{#}Rankings from AP Poll / Coaches' Poll. (#) Tournament seedings in parentheses. All times are in Central Time.

Schedule and results from GoFrogs.com

== See also ==
- 2016–17 TCU Horned Frogs men's basketball team
