= 2016–17 Iowa State Cyclones women's basketball team =

Intercollegiate basketball season

2016–17 Iowa State Cyclones women's basketball

NCAA Women's Tournament, first round
- Conference: Big 12 Conference
- Record: 18–13 (9–9 Big 12)
- Head coach: Bill Fennelly (22nd season)
- Assistant coaches: Jodi Steyer; Latoja Schaben; Billy Fennelly
- Home arena: Hilton Coliseum

2016–17 Big 12 Conference women's basketball standings
	Conf.				Overall
Team	W		L	PCT	W		L	PCT
No. 5 Baylor	17	–	1	.944	33	–	4	.892
No. 14 Texas	15	–	3	.833	25	–	9	.735
No. 23 Oklahoma	13	–	5	.722	23	–	10	.697
No. 24 Kansas State	11	–	7	.611	23	–	11	.676
Iowa State	9	–	9	.500	18	–	13	.581
No. 22 West Virginia †	8	–	10	.444	24	–	11	.686
Oklahoma State	6	–	12	.333	17	–	15	.531
Texas Tech	5	–	13	.278	14	–	17	.452
TCU	4	–	14	.222	12	–	18	.400
Kansas	2	–	16	.111	8	–	22	.267
† 2017 Big 12 tournament winner Rankings from AP poll

The 2016–17 Iowa State Cyclones women's basketball team represented Iowa State University in the 2016–17 NCAA Division I women's basketball season. This was head coach Bill Fennelly's 22nd season at Iowa State. The Cyclones were members of the Big 12 Conference and played their home games at the Hilton Coliseum. They finished the season 18–13, 9–9 in Big 12 play to finish in fifth place. They lost in the quarterfinals of the Big 12 women's tournament to Kansas State. They received an at-large bid to the NCAA women's tournament, where they lost to Syracuse in the first round.

== Radio ==
All Cyclones games were carried on the Iowa State Cyclone Radio Network. Not all affiliates carried women's basketball, and some affiliates only carried select games.

== Roster ==
2016–17 Iowa State Cyclones women's basketball team
Players
Coaches

Pos.	#	Name	Height	Year	Previous school	Hometown
G	2	Sofija Zivaljevic	5 ft 7 in (1.7 m)	Fr	ŽKK Budućnost Bemax	Podgorica, Montenegro
G	3	Emily Durr	6 ft 0 in (1.83 m)	Jr	Notre Dame	Utica, NY
F	4	Heather Bowe	6 ft 0 in (1.83 m)	Sr	Regis; Vanderbilt	Eau Claire, WI
G	10	Nia Washington	5 ft 6 in (1.68 m)	Fr	Colonial Forge	Stafford, VA
G	11	Jadda Buckley	5 ft 8 in (1.73 m)	Sr	Mason City	Mason City, IA
G	12	Seanna Johnson	5 ft 10 in (1.78 m)	Sr	DeLaSalle	Brooklyn Park, MN
F	13	Adriana Camber	5 ft 9 in (1.75 m)	Fr	Katedralskolan Lund	Lund, Sweden
F/C	14	Aliyah Konate	6 ft 4 in (1.93 m)	Fr	Mildred Harnack	Berlin, Germany
G	21	Bridget Carleton	6 ft 1 in (1.85 m)	So	John McGregor Secondary	Chatham, ON
G	22	TeeTee Starks	5 ft 9 in (1.75 m)	So	Hopkins	Brooklyn Park, MN
G	25	Lexi Albrecht	5 ft 10 in (1.78 m)	Sr	Carroll Kuemper	Carroll, IA
F	30	Claire Ricketts	6 ft 3 in (1.91 m)	Sr	John Paul II	Parker, TX
F	32	Meredith Burkhall	6 ft 3 in (1.91 m)	So	Roosevelt	Urbandle, IA
F	35	Jordan Jensen	6 ft 2 in (1.88 m)	Sr	Mountain View	Gilbert, AZ

Head coach

- Bill Fennelly (William Penn)

Assistant coach(es)

- Jodi Steyer (Colorado State)
- Latoja Schaben (Toledo)
- Billy Fennelly (Iowa State)

Legend

- (C) Team captain
- (S) Suspended
- (I) Ineligible
- (W) Walk-on
- Injured
- Current redshirt

Roster

== Schedule and results ==
Date time, TV	Rank^{#}	Opponent^{#}	Result	Record	Site (attendance) city, state
Exhibition
11/06/2016*; 1:00 pm, Cyclones.tv		Briar Cliff	W 85–46		Hilton Coliseum (9,797); Ames, IA
Non-conference regular season
11/11/2016*; 12:00 pm, Cyclones.tv		UC Santa Barbara	W 77–60	1–0	Hilton Coliseum (10,684); Ames, IA
11/15/2016*; 7:00 pm, Cyclones.tv		Northern Iowa	W 76–68	2–0	Hilton Coliseum (10,063); Ames, IA
11/20/2016*; 6:00 pm, Cyclones.tv		Drake	W 75–67	3–0	Hilton Coliseum (6,790); Ames, IA
11/22/2016*; 7:00 pm, Cyclones.tv		Savannah State	W 74–51	4–0	Hilton Coliseum (6,307); Ames, IA
11/27/2016*; 2:00 pm, Cyclones.tv		Arkansas State	W 105–53	5–0	Hilton Coliseum (6,398); Ames, IA
12/03/2016*; 1:30 pm, FSN		No. 6 Mississippi State; Big 12/SEC Women's Challenge	L 81–85 ^{OT}	5–1	Hilton Coliseum (10,643); Ames, IA
12/04/2016*; 2:00 pm, Cyclones.tv		New Orleans	W 100–63	6–1	Hilton Coliseum (9,791); Ames, IA
12/07/2016*; 7:00 pm		at Iowa; Iowa Corn Cy-Hawk Series	L 76–88	6–2	Carver–Hawkeye Arena (4,579); Iowa City, IA
12/11/2016*; 2:00 pm, Cyclones.tv		Northern Illinois	W 97–89	7–2	Hilton Coliseum (9,825); Ames, IA
12/18/2016*; 2:00 pm, Cyclones.tv		Delaware State	W 88–57	8–2	Hilton Coliseum (6,469); Ames, IA
12/21/2016*; 7:00 pm, Cyclones.tv		Sacred Heart	W 76–56	9–2	Hilton Coliseum (6,588); Ames, IA
Big 12 Conference season
12/29/2016; 7:00 pm		at Oklahoma State	L 59–71	9–3 (0–1)	Gallagher-Iba Arena (2,759); Stillwater, OK
01/01/2017; 12:00 pm, FSN		No. 16 Texas	L 68–75	9–4 (0–2)	Hilton Coliseum (7,915); Ames, IA
01/04/2017; 6:00 pm, FSSW+		at Texas Tech	L 66–75	9–5 (0–3)	United Supermarkets Arena (5,406); Lubbock, TX
01/07/2017; 1:00 pm, ESPNU		Kansas	W 87–58	10–5 (1–3)	Hilton Coliseum (7,573); Ames, IA
01/11/2017; 7:00 pm, Cyclones.tv		No. 22 Oklahoma	L 57-67	10–6 (1–4)	Hilton Coliseum (10,043); Ames, IA
01/15/2017; 12:00 pm, FSSW		at TCU	L 75–80	10-7 (1–5)	Schollmaier Arena (1,949); Fort Worth, TX
01/18/2017; 7:00 pm, FSSW+		at No. 2 Baylor	L 42–68	10–8 (1–6)	Ferrell Center (5,532); Waco, TX
01/21/2017; 5:00 pm, Cyclones.tv		No. 22 Kansas State	W 75–69	11–8 (2–6)	Hilton Coliseum (11,673); Ames, IA
01/25/2017; 7:00 pm, FCS		at No. 20 Oklahoma	L 63–78	11–9 (2–7)	Lloyd Noble Center (3,353); Norman, OK
01/28/2017; 12:00 pm, Cyclones.tv		TCU	W 72–69	12–9 (3–7)	Hilton Coliseum (10,884); Ames, IA
02/01/2017; 7:00 pm, Cyclones.tv		No. 2 Baylor	L 52–83	12–10 (3–8)	Hilton Coliseum (10,287); Ames, IA
02/04/2017; 11:00 am		at No. 22 West Virginia	W 80–55	13–10 (4–8)	WVU Coliseum (3,058); Morgantown, WV
02/11/2017; 1:00 pm, FSN		at No. 25 Kansas State	L 68–80	13–11 (4–9)	Bramlage Coliseum (8,099); Manhattan, KS
02/15/2017; 7:00 pm, Cyclones.tv		Texas Tech	W 79–68	14–11 (5–9)	Hilton Coliseum (9,927); Ames, IA
02/18/2017; 12:00 pm, Cyclones.tv		West Virginia	W 68–53	15–11 (6–9)	Hilton Coliseum (10,824); Ames, IA
02/21/2017; 7:00 pm		at Kansas	W 90–75	16–11 (7–9)	Allen Fieldhouse (2,043); Lawrence, KS
02/24/2017; 7:30 pm, LHN		at No. 6 Texas	W 70–66	17–11 (8–9)	Frank Erwin Center (4,555); Austin, TX
02/27/2017; 7:00 pm, Cyclones.tv		Oklahoma State	W 61–48	18–11 (9–9)	Hilton Coliseum (10,334); Ames, IA
Big 12 Women's Tournament
03/04/2017; 11:00 am, FSN	(5)	vs. (4) Kansas State; Quarterfinals	L 67–74	18–12	Chesapeake Energy Arena (3,420); Oklahoma City, OK
NCAA tournament
03/04/2017; 11:00 am, ESPN2	(9 B)	vs. (8 B) No. 21 Syracuse; First Round	L 65–85	18–13	Gampel Pavilion (5,670); Storrs, CT
*Non-conference game. ^{#}Rankings from AP Poll. (#) Tournament seedings in parentheses. B=Bridgeport Region. All times are in Central Time.

== Rankings ==
Regular season polls
Poll	Pre- season	Week 2	Week 3	Week 4	Week 5	Week 6	Week 7	Week 8	Week 9	Week 10	Week 11	Week 12	Week 13	Week 14	Week 15	Week 16	Week 17	Week 18	Week 19	Final
AP	RV	NR	NR	NR	NR	NR														N/A
Coaches	NR	NR	NR	NR	NR	NR														

Legend
	Increase in ranking
	Decrease in ranking
	Not ranked previous week
(RV)	Received votes

== See also ==
- 2016–17 Iowa State Cyclones men's basketball team
