= 2016–17 Baylor Lady Bears basketball team =

Intercollegiate basketball season

2016–17 Baylor Lady Bears basketball

Gulf Coast Showcase champions Big 12 conference regular season champions

NCAA tournament, Elite Eight
- Conference: Big 12 Conference

Ranking
- Coaches: No. 6
- AP: No. 5
- Record: 33–4 (17–1 Big 12)
- Head coach: Kim Mulkey (17th season)
- Assistant coaches: Bill Brock; Sytia Messer; Toyelle Wilson
- Home arena: Ferrell Center

2016–17 Big 12 Conference women's basketball standings
	Conf.				Overall
Team	W		L	PCT	W		L	PCT
No. 5 Baylor	17	–	1	.944	33	–	4	.892
No. 14 Texas	15	–	3	.833	25	–	9	.735
No. 23 Oklahoma	13	–	5	.722	23	–	10	.697
No. 24 Kansas State	11	–	7	.611	23	–	11	.676
Iowa State	9	–	9	.500	18	–	13	.581
No. 22 West Virginia †	8	–	10	.444	24	–	11	.686
Oklahoma State	6	–	12	.333	17	–	15	.531
Texas Tech	5	–	13	.278	14	–	17	.452
TCU	4	–	14	.222	12	–	18	.400
Kansas	2	–	16	.111	8	–	22	.267
† 2017 Big 12 tournament winner Rankings from AP poll

The 2016–17 Baylor Lady Bears basketball team represented Baylor University in the 2016–17 NCAA Division I women's basketball season. Returning as head coach was Hall of Famer Kim Mulkey for her 17th season. The team played its home games at the Ferrell Center in Waco, Texas and were members of the Big 12 Conference. They finished the season 33–4, 17–1 in Big 12 to win the Big 12 regular season title. They advanced to the championship game of the Big 12 women's tournament, where they upset by West Virginia. They earn an at-large bid to the NCAA women's tournament as a No. 1 seed where they defeat Texas Southern and California in the first and second rounds, Louisville in the sweet sixteen before losing to Mississippi State in the elite eight.

== Roster ==
2016–17 Baylor Bears women's basketball team
Players
Coaches

Pos.	#	Name	Height	Year	Previous school	Hometown
F	1	Dekeiya Cohen	6 ft 2 in (1.88 m)	Jr	West Ashley	Charleston, SC
G	4	Kristy Wallace	5 ft 11 in (1.8 m)	Jr	John Paul College	Loganholme, Australia
G	10	Alexandria Gulley	5 ft 7 in (1.7 m)	RS Fr	Skyline	Dallas, TX
G	12	Alexis Prince	6 ft 1 in (1.85 m)	RS Sr	Edgewater	Orlando, FL
F	13	Nina Davis	6 ft 0 in (1.83 m)	Sr	Hoover	Birmingham, AL
F	15	Lauren Cox	6 ft 4 in (1.93 m)	Fr	Flower Mound	Flower Mound, TX
G	20	Calveion Landrum	5 ft 9 in (1.75 m)	Fr	La Vega	Waco, TX
C	21	Kalani Brown	6 ft 7 in (2.01 m)	So	Salmen	Slidell, LA
G	24	Natalie Chou	6 ft 1 in (1.85 m)	Fr	Plano West	Plano, TX
G	25	Alyssa Dry	5 ft 7 in (1.7 m)	So	IMG Academy	Fort Worth, TX
G	30	Alexis Jones	5 ft 8 in (1.73 m)	RS Sr	MacArthur; Duke	Irving, TX
C	32	Beatrice Mompremier	6 ft 4 in (1.93 m)	So	Miami	Miami, FL
F/C	55	Khadijiah Cave	6 ft 2 in (1.88 m)	Sr	Lucy Laney	Augusta, GA

Head coach

- Kim Mulkey (Louisiana Tech)

Assistant coach(es)

- Bill Brock (SE Oklahoma State)
- Sytia Messer (Arkansas)
- Toyelle Wilson (Manhattan)

Legend

- (C) Team captain
- (S) Suspended
- (I) Ineligible
- (W) Walk-on
- Injured
- Current redshirt

Roster

== Rankings ==
2016–17 NCAA Division I women's basketball rankings

Regular season polls
Poll	Pre- Season	Week 2	Week 3	Week 4	Week 5	Week 6	Week 7	Week 8	Week 9	Week 10	Week 11	Week 12	Week 13	Week 14	Week 15	Week 16	Week 17	Week 18	Week 19	Final
AP	2	2	5	4	3	3	3	3	2	2	2	2	2	2	4т	4	2	2	5	N/A
Coaches	4	4	6	4	3	4	4	4	2	2	2	2	2	5	4	3	2	5	5	6

Legend
	Increase in ranking
	Decrease in ranking
	Not ranked previous week
(RV)	Received Votes

== Schedule ==
Date time, TV	Rank^{#}	Opponent^{#}	Result	Record	Site (attendance) city, state
Exhibition
11/01/2016*; 7:00 pm	No. 2	Emporia State	W 89–60		Ferrell Center (5,165); Waco, TX
11/07/2016*; 7:00 pm	No. 2	Langston	W 121–32		Ferrell Center (5,594); Waco, TX
Non-conference regular season
11/11/2016*; 3:30 pm, FSSW	No. 2	Houston Baptist	W 118–43	1–0	Ferrell Center (5,483); Waco, TX
11/14/2016*; 6:00 pm, FSSW+	No. 2	No. 9 UCLA	W 84–70	2–0	Ferrell Center (5,955); Waco, TX
11/17/2016*; 6:30 pm, SNY/ESPN3	No. 2	at No. 3 Connecticut	L 61–72	2–1	Gampel Pavilion (9,049); Storrs, CT
11/20/2016*; 2:00 pm	No. 2	Mississippi Valley State	W 101–36	3–1	Ferrell Center (5,633); Waco, TX
11/22/2016*; 7:00 pm	No. 5	Southeastern Louisiana	W 109–38	4–1	Ferrell Center (5,564); Waco, TX
11/25/2016*; 10:00 am	No. 5	vs. Kent State; Gulf Coast Showcase quarterfinals	W 84–42	5–1	Germain Arena; Estero, FL
11/26/2016*; 4:00 pm	No. 5	vs. No. 18 DePaul; Gulf Coast Showcase semifinals	W 104–72	6–1	Germain Arena; Estero, FL
11/27/2016*; 6:30 pm	No. 5	vs. No. 8 Ohio State; Gulf Coast Showcase championship	W 85–68	7–1	Germain Arena; Estero, FL
12/01/2016*; 7:00 pm, FCS	No. 4	Abilene Christian	W 79–34	8–1	Ferrell Center (5,415); Waco, TX
12/04/2016*; 2:00 pm, ESPN2	No. 4	at No. 22 Tennessee; Big 12/SEC Women's Challenge	W 88–66	9–1	Thompson–Boling Arena (9,244); Knoxville, TN
12/06/2016*; 7:00 pm, FSSW+	No. 3	Texas State	W 90–24	10–1	Ferrell Center (5,362); Waco, TX
12/15/2016*; 12:00 pm, FSSW+	No. 3	Winthrop	W 140–32	11–1	Ferrell Center (6,440); Waco, TX
Big 12 regular season
12/29/2016; 7:00 pm, FSSW+	No. 3	Kansas State	W 87–57	12–1 (1–0)	Ferrell Center (7,087); Waco, TX
01/01/2017; 2:00 pm, FSSW	No. 3	Kansas	W 90–43	13–1 (2–0)	Ferrell Center (6,501); Waco, TX
01/04/2017; 6:00 pm, FS2	No. 2	at No. 17 West Virginia	W 91–56	13–1 (3–0)	WVU Coliseum (2,466); Morgantown, WV
01/07/2017; 2:00 pm	No. 2	at Oklahoma State	W 86–50	15–1 (4–0)	Gallagher-Iba Arena (2,612); Stillwater, OK
01/11/2017; 7:00 pm, FSSW	No. 2	TCU	W 77–54	16–1 (5-0)	Ferrell Center (6,081); Waco, TX
01/15/2017; 1:00 pm, ESPNU	No. 2	at Kansas	W 92–43	17–1 (6–0)	Allen Fieldhouse (2,655); Lawrence, KS
01/18/2017; 7:00 pm, FSSW+	No. 2	Iowa State	W 68-42	18–1 (7–0)	Ferrell Center (5,532); Waco, TX
01/21/2017; 1:00 pm, FSN	No. 2	No. 24 West Virginia	W 79–73	19–1 (8–0)	Ferrell Center (6,462); Waco, TX
01/25/2017; 7:00 pm, ESPN3	No. 2	at No. 25 Kansas State	W 91–49	20–1 (9–0)	Bramlage Coliseum (4,488); Manhattan, KS
01/29/2017; 5:30 pm, ESPN2	No. 2	No. 20 Oklahoma	W 92–58	21–1 (10–0)	Ferrell Center (6,632); Waco, TX
02/01/2017; 7:00 pm, Cyclones.tv	No. 2	at Iowa State	W 83–52	22–1 (11–0)	Hilton Coliseum (10,287); Ames, IA
02/04/2017; 2:00 pm	No. 2	at Texas Tech	W 79–61	23–1 (12–0)	United Supermarkets Arena (5,054); Lubbock, TX
02/06/2017; 7:00 pm, FS1	No. 2	No. 13 Texas	L 79–85	23–2 (12–1)	Ferrell Center (7,054); Waco, TX
02/12/2017; 3:00 pm, ESPN2	No. 2	at TCU	W 91–73	24–2 (13–1)	Schollmaier Arena (3,686); Fort Worth, TX
02/18/2017; 5:00 pm, FSSW+	No. 4	Oklahoma State	W 89–67	25–2 (14–1)	Ferrell Center (6,477); Waco, TX
02/20/2017; 8:00 pm, ESPN2	No. 4	at No. 6 Texas	W 70–67	26–2 (15–1)	Frank Erwin Center (7,103); Austin, TX
02/25/2017; 12:00 pm, FSSW	No. 4	Texas Tech	W 86–48	27–2 (16–1)	Ferrell Center (7,055); Waco, TX
02/27/2017; 7:00 pm, FS1	No. 2	at No. 19 Oklahoma	W 103–64	28–2 (17–1)	Lloyd Noble Center (4,804); Norman, OK
Big 12 Women's Tournament
03/04/2017; 1:30 pm, FSN	(1) No. 2	vs. (8) Texas Tech; Quarterfinals	W 95–63	29–2	Chesapeake Energy Arena (3,420); Oklahoma City, OK
03/04/2017; 1:30 pm, FS1	(1) No. 2	vs. (4) No. 24 Kansas State; Semifinals	W 88–71	30–2	Chesapeake Energy Arena; Oklahoma City, OK
03/04/2017; 8:00 pm, FS1	(1) No. 2	vs. (6) West Virginia; Championship Game	L 66–77	30–3	Chesapeake Energy Arena (3,355); Oklahoma City, OK
NCAA Tournament
03/18/2017*; 5:30 pm, ESPN2	(1 O) No. 5	(16 O) Texas Southern; First Round	W 119–30	31–3	Ferrell Center (4,169); Waco, TX
03/20/2017*; 8:00 pm, ESPN2	(1 O) No. 5	(9 O) California; Second Round	W 86–46	32–3	Ferrell Center (3,910); Waco, TX
03/24/2017*; 8:00 pm, ESPN2	(1 O) No. 5	vs. (4 O) No. 13 Louisville; Sweet Sixteen	W 97–63	33–3	Chesapeake Energy Arena (3,499); Oklahoma City, OK
03/26/2017*; 6:30 pm, ESPN	(1 O) No. 5	vs. (2 O) No. 7 Mississippi State; Elite Eight	L 85–94 ^{OT}	33–4	Chesapeake Energy Arena (3,128); Oklahoma City, OK
*Non-conference game. ^{#}Rankings from AP Poll. (#) Tournament seedings in parentheses. O=Oklahoma City Region. All times are in Central Time.

== See also ==
- 2016–17 Baylor Bears basketball team
