= 2016–17 West Virginia Mountaineers women's basketball team =

American college basketball season

2016–17 West Virginia Mountaineers women's basketball

Savannah Invitational Champions Big 12 Tournament Champions

NCAA Women's Tournament, second round
- Conference: Big 12 Conference

Ranking
- Coaches: No. 20
- AP: No. 22
- Record: 24–11 (8–10 Big 12)
- Head coach: Mike Carey (16th season)
- Assistant coaches: Chester Nichols; Diane Richardson; Lester Rowe
- Home arena: WVU Coliseum

2016–17 Big 12 Conference women's basketball standings
| | Conf. | | | | Overall |
| Team | W | | L | PCT | W | | L | PCT |
|---|---|---|---|---|---|---|---|---|
| No. 5 Baylor | 17 | – | 1 | .944 | 33 | – | 4 | .892 |
| No. 14 Texas | 15 | – | 3 | .833 | 25 | – | 9 | .735 |
| No. 23 Oklahoma | 13 | – | 5 | .722 | 23 | – | 10 | .697 |
| No. 24 Kansas State | 11 | – | 7 | .611 | 23 | – | 11 | .676 |
| Iowa State | 9 | – | 9 | .500 | 18 | – | 13 | .581 |
| No. 22 West Virginia † | 8 | – | 10 | .444 | 24 | – | 11 | .686 |
| Oklahoma State | 6 | – | 12 | .333 | 17 | – | 15 | .531 |
| Texas Tech | 5 | – | 13 | .278 | 14 | – | 17 | .452 |
| TCU | 4 | – | 14 | .222 | 12 | – | 18 | .400 |
| Kansas | 2 | – | 16 | .111 | 8 | – | 22 | .267 |
† 2017 Big 12 tournament winner Rankings from AP poll

The 2016–17 West Virginia Mountaineers women's basketball team represented West Virginia University during the 2016–17 NCAA Division I women's basketball season. The Mountaineers were coached by sixteenth year head coach Mike Carey and played their home games at WVU Coliseum and are members of the Big 12 Conference. The team finished sixth in the regular season but won the 2017 Big 12 Tournament. They finished with a record of 24–11, 8–10 in Big 12 play to finish in sixth place. They received an automatic bid to the NCAA women's tournament, where they defeated Elon in the first round before losing to Maryland in the second round.

== Roster ==
2016–17 West Virginia Mountaineers women's basketball team
Players
Coaches

| Pos. | # | Name | Height | Year | Previous school | Hometown |
|---|---|---|---|---|---|---|
| G | 2 | Alexis Brewer | 5 ft 9 in (1.75 m) | So | Bardstown | Buffalo, KY |
| G | 3 | Oliva Seggie | 5 ft 3 in (1.6 m) | So | Morgantown | Morgantown, WV |
| G | 4 | Nia Staples | 5 ft 9 in (1.75 m) | Fr | Lakota West | Cincinnati, OH |
| G | 5 | Tynice Martin | 5 ft 10 in (1.78 m) | So | Southwest Atlanta Christian Academy | Atlanta, GA |
| F | 11 | Teana Muldrow | 6 ft 1 in (1.85 m) | RS Jr | East Orange | East Orange, NJ |
| G | 12 | Chania Ray | 5 ft 8 in (1.73 m) | Jr | Riverdale Baptist; Florida State | Alexandria, VA |
| F | 13 | Kristina King | 6 ft 3 in (1.91 m) | Jr | New Hope Christian Academy; Gulf Coast State | Mebane, NC |
| G | 14 | Bailey Thomas | 5 ft 9 in (1.75 m) | Fr | Centennial | Rochester Hills, MI |
| C | 15 | Lanay Montgomery | 6 ft 5 in (1.96 m) | RS Sr | Academy of the Holy Cross | Pittsburgh, PA |
| C | 20 | Desiree Rhodes | 6 ft 1 in (1.85 m) | Sr | Aurora East; Wabash Valley College | Aurora, IL |
| G | 22 | Katrina Pardee | 5 ft 9 in (1.75 m) | So | Vista Ridge | Cedar Park, TX |
| G | 23 | Aisha Edwards | 5 ft 8 in (1.73 m) | RS Jr | West Boca Raton; Chipola JC | Boca Raton, FL |
| G/F | 24 | Anja Martin | 5 ft 11 in (1.8 m) | So | John Paul Stevens | San Antonio, TX |
| F | 45 | Marlena Schmidt | 6 ft 6 in (1.98 m) | So | Ringgold | Eighty Four, PA |
| F | 55 | Krys McCune | 6 ft 4 in (1.93 m) | Fr | duPont Manual | Louisville, KY |

Head coach

- Mike Carey (Salem)

Assistant coach(es)

- Chester Nichols (Greenville)
- Diane Richardson (Frostburg State)
- Lester Rowe (West Virginia)

Legend

- (C) Team captain
- (S) Suspended
- (I) Ineligible
- (W) Walk-on
- Injured
- Current redshirt

Roster

== Schedule ==
| Date time, TV | Rank^{#} | Opponent^{#} | Result | Record | Site (attendance) city, state |
Exhibition
| 11/01/2016*; 7:00 pm | No. 22 | Concord | W 104–48 | | Robert C. Byrd HS (2,116); Clarksburg, WV |
Non-Conference Games
| 11/12/2016*; 4:00 pm | No. 22 | Charleston Southern | W 88–38 | 1–0 | WVU Coliseum (1,144); Morgantown, WV |
| 11/15/2016*; 6:30 pm | No. 21 | Howard | W 95–49 | 2–0 | WVU Coliseum (1,052); Morgantown, WV |
| 11/19/2016*; 1:00 pm | No. 21 | Coppin State | W 69–39 | 3–0 | WVU Coliseum (2,173); Morgantown, WV |
| 11/22/2016*; 7:00 pm | No. 19 | vs. North Carolina A&T; Savannah Invitational | W 80–64 | 4–0 | Savannah Civic Center (319); Savannah, GA |
| 11/23/2016*; 4:30 pm | No. 19 | vs. East Carolina; Savannah Invitational | W 79–47 | 5–0 | Savannah Civic Center; Savannah, GA |
| 11/24/2016*; 7:00 pm | No. 19 | vs. Auburn; Savannah Invitational | W 56–52 | 6–0 | Savannah Civic Center (417); Savannah, GA |
| 11/27/2016*; 4:00 pm | No. 19 | High Point | W 82–59 | 7–0 | WVU Coliseum (1,134); Morgantown, WV |
| 11/30/2016*; 6:30 pm | No. 16 | Morehead State | W 94–53 | 8–0 | WVU Coliseum (1,179); Morgantown, WV |
| 12/04/2016*; 4:00 pm | No. 16 | Ole Miss; Big 12/SEC Women's Challenge | W 66–61 | 9–0 | WVU Coliseum (2,634); Morgantown, WV |
| 12/10/2016*; 6:30 pm | No. 13 | USC Upstate | W 91–33 | 10–0 | WVU Coliseum (1,435); Morgantown, WV |
| 12/17/2016*; 4:00 pm | No. 14 | vs. Longwood | W 107–40 | 11–0 | Charleston Civic Center (2,024); Charleston, WV |
| 12/21/2016*; 6:30 pm | No. 13 | Mount St. Mary's | W 77–45 | 12–0 | WVU Coliseum (1,269); Morgantown, WV |
Conference Games
| 12/29/2016; 7:30 pm | No. 12 | at TCU | W 83–61 | 13–0 (1–0) | Schollmaier Arena (1,770); Fort Worth, TX |
| 01/01/2017; 2:00 pm, Cox Kansas | No. 12 | at Kansas State | L 71–86 | 13–1 (1–1) | Bramlage Coliseum (4,825); Manhattan, KS |
| 01/04/2017; 7:00 pm, FS2 | No. 17 | No. 2 Baylor | L 56–91 | 13–2 (1–2) | WVU Coliseum (2,466); Morgantown, WV |
| 01/08/2017; 4:00 pm, FS1 | No. 17 | No. 20 Oklahoma | W 83–73 | 14–2 (2–2) | WVU Coliseum (2,563); Morgantown, WV |
| 01/11/2017; 7:30 pm, FSSW+ | No. 18 | at Texas Tech | L 66–75 | 14–3 (2–3) | United Supermarkets Arena (4,829); Lubbock, TX |
| 01/14/2017; 4:00 pm | No. 18 | No. 16 Texas | L 63–73 | 14–4 (2–4) | WVU Coliseum (4,118); Morgantown, WV |
| 01/18/2017; 8:00 pm | No. 24 | at Kansas | W 62-51 | 15–4 (3–4) | Allen Fieldhouse (1,833); Lawrence, KS |
| 01/21/2017; 2:00 pm, FSN | No. 24 | at No. 2 Baylor | L 73–79 | 15–5 (3–5) | Ferrell Center (6,462); Waco, TX |
| 01/25/2017; 7:00 pm | No. 22 | Texas Tech | W 89–79 | 16–5 (4–5) | WVU Coliseum (2,051); Morgantown, WV |
| 01/28/2017; 4:00 pm, FS1 | No. 22 | at No. 12 Texas | L 54–69 | 16–6 (4–6) | Frank Erwin Center (4,123); Austin, TX |
| 02/04/2017; 12:00 pm | No. 22 | Iowa State | L 55–80 | 16–7 (4–7) | WVU Coliseum (3,058); Morgantown, WV |
| 02/07/2017; 8:00 pm | No. 22 | at No. 19 Oklahoma | L 87–90 ^{2OT} | 16–8 (4–8) | Lloyd Noble Center (4,890); Norman, OK |
| 02/11/2017; 6:30 pm | | Oklahoma State | W 79–53 | 17–8 (5–8) | WVU Coliseum (4,024); Morgantown, WV |
| 02/15/2017; 7:00 pm, RTPT | | No. 24 Kansas State | W 66–59 | 18–8 (6–8) | WVU Coliseum (1,642); Morgantown, WV |
| 02/18/2017; 1:00 pm | | at Iowa State | L 53–68 | 18–9 (6–9) | Hilton Coliseum (10,824); Ames, IA |
| 02/22/2017; 6:00 pm | | TCU | W 77–73 | 19–9 (7–9) | WVU Coliseum (2,147); Morgantown, WV |
| 02/25/2017; 7:00 pm | | at Oklahoma State | L 63–67 | 19–10 (7–10) | Gallagher-Iba Arena (1,884); Stillwater, OK |
| 02/27/2017; 7:00 pm, RTPT | | Kansas | W 73–54 | 20–10 (8–10) | WVU Coliseum (2,661); Morgantown, WV |
Big 12 Women's Tournament
| 03/04/2017; 9:30 pm, FSN | (6) | vs. (3) No. 19 Oklahoma; Quarterfinals | W 82–58 | 21–10 | Chesapeake Energy Arena (3,852); Oklahoma City, OK |
| 03/05/2017; 4:00 pm, FS1 | (6) | vs. (2) No. 12 Texas; Semifinals | W 62–59 | 22–10 | Chesapeake Energy Arena (3,475); Oklahoma City, OK |
| 03/06/2017; 8:00 pm, FS1 | (6) | vs. (1) No. 2 Baylor; Championship Game | W 77–66 | 23–10 | Chesapeake Energy Arena (3,355); Oklahoma City, OK |
NCAA Women's Tournament
| 03/17/2017*; 2:30 pm, ESPN2 | (6 B) No. 22 | vs. (11 B) Elon; First Round | W 75–62 | 24–10 | Xfinity Center (3,511); College Park, MD |
| 03/19/2017*; 2:30 pm, ESPN2 | (6 B) No. 22 | at (3 B) No. 4 Maryland; Second Round | L 56–83 | 24–11 | Xfinity Center (6,129); College Park, MD |
*Non-conference game. ^{#}Rankings from AP Poll. (#) Tournament seedings in parentheses. B=Bridgeport Region. All times are in Eastern Time.

== Rankings ==
2016–17 NCAA Division I women's basketball rankings

Regular season polls
| Poll | Pre- Season | Week 2 | Week 3 | Week 4 | Week 5 | Week 6 | Week 7 | Week 8 | Week 9 | Week 10 | Week 11 | Week 12 | Week 13 | Week 14 | Week 15 | Week 16 | Week 17 | Week 18 | Week 19 | Final |
|---|---|---|---|---|---|---|---|---|---|---|---|---|---|---|---|---|---|---|---|---|
| AP | 22 | 21 | 19 | 16 | 13 | 14 | 13 | 12 | 17 | 18 | 24 | 22 | 22 | RV | RV | RV | NR | RV | 22 | N/A |
| Coaches | 25 | 25 | 23 | 17 | 14 | 14 | 12 | 12 | 16 | 19 | 23 | 22 | 23 | RV | RV | RV | NR | 22 | 21 | 20 |

Legend
| | Increase in ranking |
| | Decrease in ranking |
| | No change |
| (RV) | Received votes |
| (NR) | Not ranked |

== See also ==
- 2016–17 West Virginia Mountaineers men's basketball team
