= Georgeann Wells =

American basketball player

Personal information
- Listed height: 6 ft 7 in (2.01 m)

Career information
- High school: Northland (Columbus, Ohio)
- College: West Virginia (1982–1986)
- Position: Center

Georgeann Wells is an All-American basketball player, who was active at West Virginia University (WVU) from 1982 to 1986. Among her other accomplishments, Wells is notable as the first American woman to register a dunk in an official NCAA intercollegiate basketball game on December 21, 1984. She did so with a regulation-sized ball (also known as a men's basketball).

== Early life ==
A native of Columbus, Ohio, Wells grew up in a family of 9 children. Wells had an interest in basketball from a young age, playing on her middle school team as well as her high school team at Columbus Northland High School. Aided by her talent, Northland went on to win the state basketball championship. This, in turn, helped Wells secure two athletic scholarships to West Virginia University, which recruited her heavily.

== College career ==
During her freshman year playing for West Virginia University, Wells averaged 11.9 points per game. In addition to her high scoring, Wells crafted her dunking talent, training to achieve her goal of dunking during a live regulation game. Leveraging her tall stature, Wells and her coaches worked an additional 10 to 15 minutes after each practice, with Wells dunking seven to 20 times to perfect her form Early during the 1984–85 season, Wells came very near to achieving her goal, but her dunk was cancelled when one of her opponents fouled Wells' sister, Marva, just as Wells attempted her dunk.

Not long after, on December 21, 1984, Wells went on to make history. Playing at Elkins Randolph County Armory against the University of Charleston (WV), with 11:18 remaining in the game, Wells received a pass from point guard Lisa Ribble and achieved the first official dunk in a women's college basketball game. WVU won 110–82. The accomplishment was covered extensively in the national media, including the New York Times, Sports Illustrated, and USA Today. The Naismith Basketball Hall of Fame featured Wells's accomplishment in a dedicated exhibit, and Wells was honored at an NCAA luncheon in New York.

Despite the media coverage, national headlines, and the 100 or so eyewitnesses at the game, for nearly 25 years it was believed that there was no videotape of Wells's achievement. Then, Reed Albergotti, a sports reporter from The Wall Street Journal, started the research for his 2009 feature article "The Dunk That Made History," which celebrates the 25-year anniversary of Wells' historic dunk. Albergotti contacted Ford Francis, the son of Bud Francis, who had been the University of Charleston coach in December 1984. Anticipating Wells' intention and even warning his players against the likelihood that Wells would attempt a dunk, Bud Francis stationed a team staffer with a camera on the east side of the armory. A quarter of a century later, Ford Francis recalled that, after his father's death, he had inherited a tape labeled simply "W.V.U.-84 Elkins." Upon watching the tape, Francis and Albergotti realized that, even though West Virginia University had left its heavy cameras at home, the historic footage did exist.

No woman dunked again in an official game until 1994, when North Carolina's senior forward Charlotte Smith made the second recorded dunk in a women's regular collegiate basketball game against North Carolina A&T State University.

In addition to her historic slam dunk, Wells enjoyed a remarkable career for the WVU women's basketball team. She was a four-year letter winner, scoring 1,484 points and pulling down 1,075 rebounds. Her 436 blocked shots is the all-time record for women at WVU.

== Post-college career ==
After her college years, Wells toured with the Harlem Globetrotters. Wells also coached for a time, including professional coaching in Japan from 1986 to 1992, as well as in Spain, Italy, and France from 1992 to 2003. More recently, Wells has worked as a physical-education teacher in a suburb of her hometown Columbus, Ohio.

== Honors and awards ==
As center for WVU, Wells earned many honors, including

- Third Team, All-American (1985)
- Freshman All-American (1983)
- First Team, All-Atlantic 10 (1985, 1986)
- Second Team, All-Atlantic 10 (1984)

In April 2015, Wells and other African-American student athletes were honored at the Erickson Alumni Center at WVU, as part of a three-day tribute (April 23–25, 2015) to recognize the anniversary of the 1954 Supreme Court decision in Brown v. Board of Education and the achievements of pioneering African-American student athletes.

== See also ==
- A Brief History of Women’s Basketball at West Virginia University
- Steelhammer, R. (2013). Duchess of Dunk - 1984. In It Happened in West Virginia : Remarkable Events That Shaped History (pp. 132–134). Guilford, CT: Morris Publishing
- Ford, L. (1999). Lady Hoopsters: A History of Women's Basketball in America. Kearney, NE: Morris Publishing.
