= West Virginia Mountaineers women's basketball =

2026–27 West Virginia Mountaineers women's basketball team
- University: West Virginia University
- Head coach: Mark Kellogg (4th season)
- Location: Morgantown, West Virginia
- Arena: Hope Coliseum (capacity: 14,000)
- Conference: Big 12 Conference
- Nickname: Mountaineers
- Colors: Gold and blue
- All-time record: 909–640

NCAA Division I tournament Sweet Sixteen
- 1992

NCAA Division I tournament appearances
- 1989, 1992, 2004, 2007, 2008, 2010, 2011, 2012, 2013, 2014, 2016, 2017, 2021, 2023, 2024, 2025, 2026

Conference tournament champions
- A-10 1989; Big 12 2017, 2026

Conference regular-season champions
- A-10 1992; Big 12 2014

Uniforms
Home	Away	Alternate

The West Virginia Mountaineers women's basketball team represents West Virginia University in NCAA Division I college basketball competition. They are a member of the Big 12 Conference. West Virginia has earned twelve bids to the NCAA Division I women's basketball tournament. In 2017, they won the Big 12 Tournament, despite finishing sixth in the regular season.

== History ==
The first women's basketball team was started in 1973, as a result of the Title IX mandates. The first coach was Kittie Blakemore, who was asked to create a schedule against ten local teams. The first year, the team played 14 games, winning four. The team improved the next year, winning 13 of their 17 games. Blakemore would remain as head coach for 19 seasons, leading the team to a conference tournament championship in the A10 in 1989, and a first-place finish in the regular season in her final season, 1992. In 2014, the team finished as the Big 12 regular season champions. West Virginia's other Big 12 title came by way of winning the 2017 and the 2026 Big 12 Conference women's basketball tournaments.

=== Notable figures ===
- Yelena Leuchanka
- Cathy Parson
- Olayinka Sanni
- Georgeann Wells

=== Head coaches ===
- Kittie Blakemore (1973–1992)
- Bill Fiske (1984–1987)
- Scott Harrelson (1987–1996)
- Susan Walvius (1996–1998)
- Alexis Basil (1998–2001)
- Mike Carey (2001–2022)
- Dawn Plitzuweit (2022–2023)
- Mark Kellogg (2023-Present)

== Current roster ==
2025–26 West Virginia Mountaineers women's basketball team
Players
Coaches

Pos.	#	Name	Height	Year	Previous school	Hometown
F	1	Carter McCray	6 ft 1 in (1.85 m)	Jr	Elyria Catholic; Wisconsin	Oberlin, Ohio
G	2	Sydney Woodley	5 ft 8 in (1.73 m)	Sr	Paloma Valley High School; Long Beach State	Menifee, CA
G	3	Gia Cooke	5 ft 8 in (1.73 m)	RS Jr	Bishop McNamara; Houston	Upper Marlboro, Maryland
G	4	Madison Parrish	5 ft 11 in (1.8 m)	Fr	William Mason High School	Mason, Oh
G	5	Sydney Shaw	5 ft 9 in (1.75 m)	Sr	DME Academy; Auburn	Miami, FL
G	10	Jordan Harrison	5 ft 6 in (1.68 m)	Sr	Classen SAS; Stephen F. Austin	Oklahoma Ciry, OK
F	21	Riley Makalusky	6 ft 2 in (1.88 m)	Jr	Hamilton Southern; Butler	Fishers, Ind
F	22	Kierra Wheeler	6 ft 1 in (1.85 m)	GS	Robbinsdale Cooper High School; Norfolk State	Minneapolis, Minn
F	23	Jordan Thomas	6 ft 3 in (1.91 m)	So	Hebron HS	Carrollton, TX
G	25	Loghan Johnson	5 ft 10 in (1.78 m)	Jr	Houston Christian High School; Texas Tech	Houston, TX
F	37	Célia Riviére	6 ft 3 in (1.91 m)	Sr	Lattes Montpellier; Northwest Florida State	Paris, France

Head coach

- Mark Kellogg (Austin College)

Assistant coach(es)

- JC Carter (Southwest Baptist)
- Jessica Grayson (Austin Peay)
- Erin Grant (Texas Tech)
- Kasondra McKay

Legend

- (C) Team captain
- (S) Suspended
- (I) Ineligible
- (W) Walk-on
- Injured
- Current redshirt

Roster
Last update: 12/24/2025

== School records ==
=== Career leaders ===
- Points Scored: Cathy Parson 2,115 (1980-83)
- Rebounds: Olivia Bradley 1,484 (1982-85)
- Assists: Yolanda Paige 902 (2002-05)
- Steals: Talisha Hargis 355(1995-98)
- Games Played: Teana Muldrow 143(2014-18)
- Games Started: Aysa Bussie 138 (2010-12) (2014)
- Double-Doubles: Olivia Bradley 71(1982-85)
- 30-point Games: Rosemary Kosiorek (89-92), Meg Bulger (04-07), Talisha Hargis (95-98) 3 tied with 6
- 3-pointers: Kate Bulger 302 (2001-04)

=== Single-season leaders ===
- Points Scored: Rosemary Kosiorek (730, 1992)
- Rebounds: Olivia Bradley, (458, 1985)
- Assists: Yolanda Paige (297, 2005)
- Steals: Jenny Hillen (114, 1989)
- Double-Doubles: Georgeann Wells (22, 1986)
- 30-point Games: Meg Bulger (5, 2005)

== National Rankings ==
West Virginia University has finished the season ranked 9 times.

Year	Overall Record	Conference Record	Final Ranking
1991-92	24-6	12-6; A-10	AP Poll #14; Coaches #11
2007-08	25–8	12-4; Big East	AP Poll #17; Coaches #20
2009-10	29–6	13-3; Big East	AP Poll #10; Coaches #16
2013-14	30–5	14-2; Big 12	AP Poll #7; Coaches #7
2015-16	25-10	12-6; Big 12	AP Poll #25; Coaches #23
2016-17	23-10	8-10; Big 12	AP Poll #20; Coaches #22
2020-21	22-7	13-5; Big 12	AP Poll #20; Coaches #17
2023-24	25-8	12-6; Big 12	AP Poll #25; Coaches #24
2024-25	25-8	13-5; Big 12	AP Poll #21; Coaches #21

== Year by year results ==
Season	Team	Overall	Conference	Standing	Postseason	Coaches' poll	AP poll
Kittie Blakemore (Independent) (1973–1992)
1973–74	Kittie Blakemore	4–10	–		AIAW State Tournament		
1974–75	Kittie Blakemore	13–4	–		AIAW State Tournament		
1975–76	Kittie Blakemore	13–6	–		AIAW Midwest Regional		
1976–77	Kittie Blakemore	19–7	–		AIAW Midwest Regional		
1977–78	Kittie Blakemore	18–9	–		AIAW Midwest Regional		
1978–79	Kittie Blakemore	9–16	–				
1979–80	Kittie Blakemore	10–19	–				
1980–81	Kittie Blakemore	15–18	–				
1981–82	Kittie Blakemore	20–11	–				
1982–83	Kittie Blakemore	17–12	–				
Atlantic 10 Conference
1983–84	Kittie Blakemore	17–12	6–2	T–2nd			
1984–85	Kittie Blakemore	20–10	6–2	3rd	NWIT Seventh Place		
1985–86	Kittie Blakemore	12–17	8–8	T–3rd			
1986–87	Kittie Blakemore	14–15	8–10	7th			
1987–88	Kittie Blakemore	14–14	9–9	T–5th			
1988–89	Kittie Blakemore	24–8	12–6	T–4th	NCAA Second Round (Play-in)		
1989–90	Kittie Blakemore	19–10	12–6	4th			
1990–91	Kittie Blakemore	17–12	11–7	4th			
1991–92	Kittie Blakemore	26–4	16–0	1st	NCAA Sixteen	11	14
Kittie Blakemore:		301–214	88–50				
Scott Harrelson (Atlantic 10) (1992–1995)
1992–93	Scott Harrelson	12–16	7–7	4th			
1993–94	Scott Harrelson	8–19	4–12	8th			
1994–95	Scott Harrelson	8–20	4–12	T–7th			
Scott Harrelson:		28–55	15–31				
Big East Conference (1979–2012)
Susan Walvius (Big East) (1995–1997)
1995–96	Susan Walvius	12–15	7–11	T–4th			
1996–97	Susan Walvius	19–12	11–7	4th			
Susan Walvius:		31–27	18–18				
Alexis Basil (Big East) (1997–2001)
1997–98	Alexis Basil	12–16	7–11	5th (BE 6)			
1998–99	Alexis Basil	10–17	5–13	10th			
1999–2000	Alexis Basil	6–22	1–15	13th			
2000–01	Alexis Basil	5–22	3–13	T–12th			
Alexis Basil:		33–77	16–52				
Mike Carey (Big East) (2001–2022)
2001–02	Mike Carey	14–14	6–10	T–9th			
2002–03	Mike Carey	15–13	4–12	T–11th			
2003–04	Mike Carey	21–11	10–6	T–6th	NCAA First Round		
2004–05	Mike Carey	21–13	7–9	T–6th	WNIT Finals		
2005–06	Mike Carey	15–16	4–12	12th			
2006–07	Mike Carey	21–11	11–5	4th	NCAA Second Round		
2007–08	Mike Carey	25–8	12–4	3rd	NCAA Second Round	20	17
2008–09	Mike Carey	18–15	5–11	T–11th	WNIT First Round (Play-in)		
2009–10	Mike Carey	29–6	13–3	T–2nd	NCAA Second Round	16	10
2010–11	Mike Carey	24–10	8–8	10th	NCAA Second Round		
2011–12	Mike Carey	24–10	11–5	T–4th	NCAA Second Round		
Big 12 Conference (2012–present)
2012–13	Mike Carey	17–14	9–9	T–5th	NCAA First Round		
2013–14	Mike Carey	30–5	16–2	T–1st	NCAA Second Round	7	7
2014–15	Mike Carey	23–15	7–11	T–7th	WNIT Championship Game		
2015–16	Mike Carey	25–10	12–6	3rd	NCAA Second Round	23	25
2016–17	Mike Carey	23–10	8–10	6th	NCAA Second Round	22	20
2017–18	Mike Carey	25–12	8–10	6th	WNIT Semifinals		
2018–19	Mike Carey	22–11	11–7	4th	WNIT 3rd Rouund		
2019–20	Mike Carey	17–12	7–11	T–5th			
2020–21	Mike Carey	22–7	13–5	T–2nd	NCAA Second Round	17	20
2021–22	Mike Carey	15–15	7–11	7th			
Mike Carey:		431–223	182–156				
Dawn Plitzuweit (Big 12) (2022–2023)
2022–23	Dawn Plitzuweit	19–12	10–8	T–4th	NCAA First Round		
Dawn Plitzuweit:		19–12	10–8				
Mark Kellogg (Big 12) (2023–Present)
2023–24	Mark Kellogg	25–8	12–6	T–4th	NCAA Second Round	24	25
2024–25	Mark Kellogg	25-8	13–5	T–4th	NCAA Second Round	21	21
2025–26	Mark Kellogg	0-0	0–0				
Mark Kellogg:		50–16	25–11				
Total:		909–640					
National champion Postseason invitational champion Conference regular season champion Conference regular season and conference tournament champion Division regular season champion Division regular season and conference tournament champion Conference tournament champion

== NCAA tournament results ==
West Virginia has reached the NCAA Division I women's basketball tournament 17 times. They have a record of 14–18.

Year	Seed	Round	Opponent	Result
1989	#12	First Round; Second Round	#5 Western Kentucky #4 Virginia	W 66−57; L 68–81
1992	#4	Second Round; Sweet Sixteen	#5 Clemson #1 Virginia	W 73−72; L 83–103
2004	#11	First Round	#6 Ohio State	L 67–73
2007	#11	First Round; Second Round	#6 Xavier #3 LSU	W 65−52; L 43–49
2008	#5	First Round; Second Round	#12 New Mexico #4 Vanderbilt	W 61−60; L 46–64
2010	#3	First Round; Second Round	#14 Lamar #11 San Diego State	W 58−43; L 55–64
2011	#9	First Round; Second Round	#8 Houston #1 Baylor	W 78−73; L 68–82
2012	#8	First Round; Second Round	#9 Texas #1 Stanford	W 68−55; L 55–72
2013	#11	First Round	#6 Delaware	L 53–66
2014	#2	First Round; Second Round	#15 Albany #7 LSU	W 76−61; L 67–76
2016	#6	First Round; Second Round	#11 Princeton #3 Ohio State	W 74−65; L 81–88
2017	#6	First Round; Second Round	#11 Elon #3 Maryland	W 75−62; L 56–83
2021	#4	First Round; Second Round	#13 Lehigh #5 Georgia Tech	W 77−53; L 56–73
2023	#10	First Round	#7 Arizona	L 62–75
2024	#8	First Round; Second Round	#9 Princeton #1 Iowa	W 63−53; L 54-64
2025	#6	First Round; Second Round	#11 Columbia #3 North Carolina	W 78-59; L 47-58
2026	#4	First Round; Second Round	#13 Miami (OH) #5 Kentucky	W 82–54; L 73-74

== See also ==
- West Virginia Mountaineers men's basketball
