= Mike Carey (basketball) =

American college basketball coach

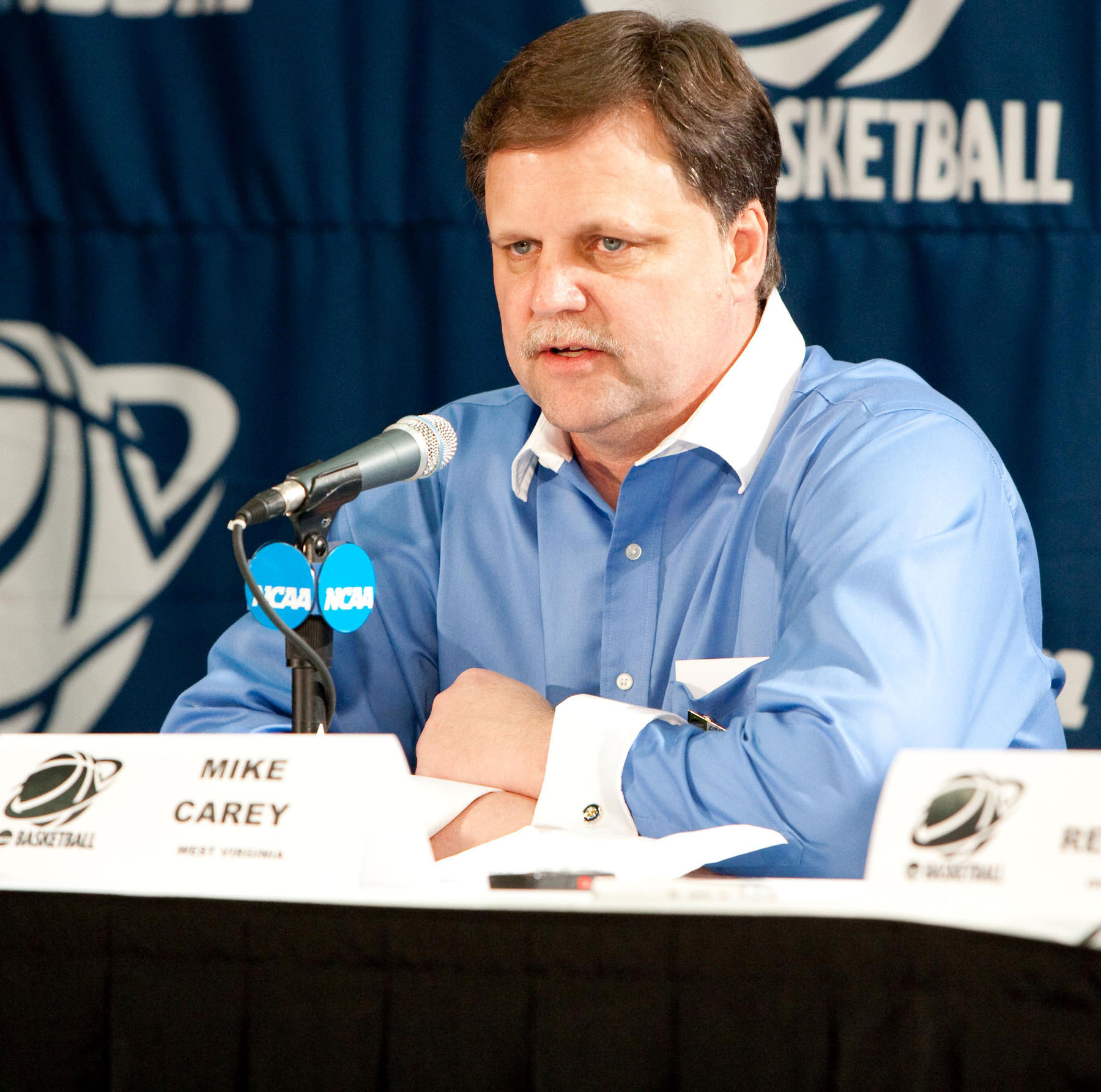

Biographical details
- Born: July 4, 1958 (age 68); Clarksburg, West Virginia, U.S.

Playing career
- 1977–1980: Salem International University

Coaching career (HC unless noted)
- 1980–1983: Flemington HS
- 1983–1987: Liberty HS
- 1987–1988: Salem (men's asst.)
- 1988–2001: Salem / Salem-Teikyo (men's)
- 2001–2022: West Virginia
- 2023–2024: UCF (women's assistant)

Head coaching record
- Overall: 736–342 (.683)

Accomplishments and honors

Awards
- WVIAC Freshman of the year (1977); 2× Big East Coach of the Year (2004, 2010)

Michael Alan Carey (born July 4, 1958) is the former head coach of the West Virginia University women's basketball team. He had previously served as head basketball coach for the Salem International University men's basketball team.

Carey played basketball for Salem International University, earning a letter in each of his four years at the school. In his freshman year, he was named the West Virginia Intercollegiate Athletic Conference freshman of the year, an honor his son would win in 2006.

== High school ==
Born and raised in Clarksburg, West Virginia, Carey was active in three sports while attending Liberty High School.

== College career ==
Carey played basketball each of his four years at Salem. He was named the West Virginia Intercollegiate Athletic Conference (WVIAC) freshman of the year in 1977. He went on to be the conference scoring leader in 1978, and earned MVP honors for Salem in 1979. In that year, he was also named to the WVIAC all-conference team. In his four years at Salem, he scored over 2,000 points. Carey was named to the Salem Athletic Hall of Fame in 1993.

== Coaching career ==
=== Flemington and Clarksburg Liberty ===
After graduating from Salem in 1980 with a degree in physical education, Carey was offered a position to be an assistant coach of the boys' team at the high school Flemington, West Virginia. Carey was interested, but the job offer came with a catch. He also had to be the head coach of the girls' team. He accepted the offer. He went on to coach girls' basketball at the high school level for seven years, in Flemington and at Liberty High School in Clarksburg, West Virginia. In his final year as high school coach, he earned coach of the year honors from Harrison County and coached the team to the regional finals.

=== Salem ===
Carey returned to his alma mater and became the assistant coach for the Salem men's basketball program in 1987. After one year as an assistant he became the head coach in 1988. The program did not have a history of success, posting an 8–19 record in the year before he took over, but Carey coached the team to a winning record in his first year as head coach. In thirteen seasons, his teams had only one losing record. In nine of the thirteen years, the team won more than 20 games. Twice, the teams made it to the Division II Elite eight and in 1997, the team made it to the Division II Final Four.

Carey celebrated his milestone 250th victory on January 29, 2000, in an 86–76 victory over Shepherd College. At the time, he had coached teams to the West Virginia Intercollegiate Athletic Conference championship five times. By the time he completed his coaching career at Salem, teams he coached made seven post-season appearances, with five in the NCAA division II tournaments, and two in the NAIA tournaments.

=== West Virginia ===
Carey took over a team that had only five wins in its previous season. In his first season, the team improved to 14–14, and has had only one losing season since (15–16 in 2005–06). On January 29, 2008, West Virginia would upset Rutgers University, then ranked #4 in the country, representing the highest ranked team they had beaten in school history.

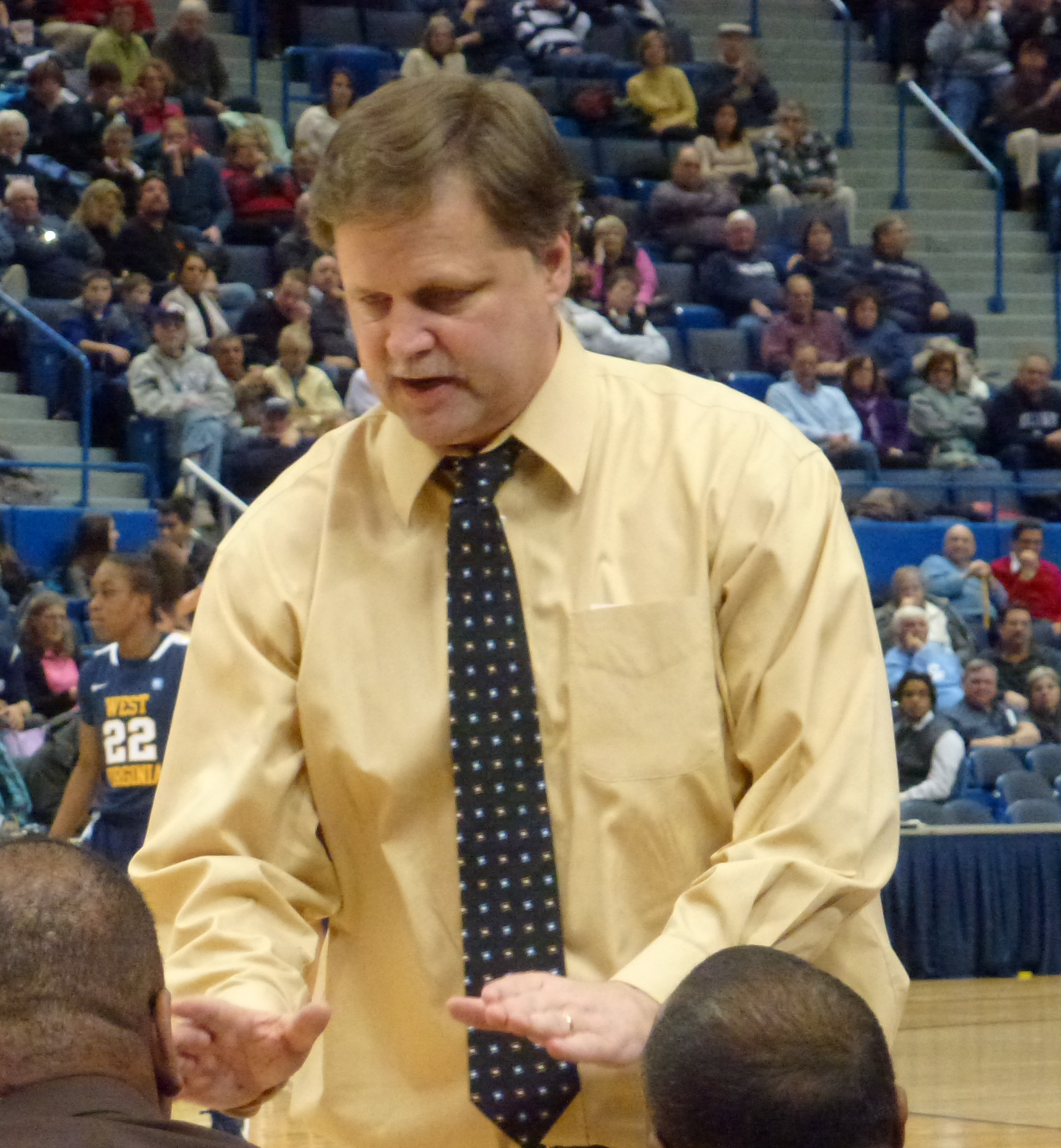
Carey talking to Coaching staff at WVU-UConn game 4 January 2012

In 2007–08, the team earned its first top 20 ranking in school history, reaching as high as 11th place in both major polls. They ended the year at 25–8, and advanced to the second round of the NCAA tournament.

In 2009–10, West Virginia won a school-record 29 games. The team was ranked as high as #7 in the AP Poll during the year, and reached semi-finals of the Big East women's basketball tournament, only to fall to Connecticut. Despite the success of the year, Carey still has not achieved one of his goals—to beat Connecticut. He said, "This is my 10th year and we've beat every team in the conference except Connecticut". The team was undefeated at home for only the second time in program history. The Big East voted him co-coach of the year, along with Geno Auriemma.

Carey's 200th win at West Virginia occurred on February 19, 2011, in a game against Pittsburgh. West Virginia had failed to win in their previous three attempts to reach the 200 win milestone, but the team prevailed against Pittsburgh 90–79.

After a 24–10 season in 2011, Carey's Mountaineers lost five seniors to graduation. The team had four incoming freshman for the upcoming, a class ranked #21, by ESPNU HoopGurlz.

On December 28, Carey's team helped him reach a milestone–his 500th career victory. The game didn't start out like it would finish—opponent Bucknell University started out with a 6–2 lead before the Mountaineers ran off 12 straight points to take a large lead. West Virginia ended up winning easily, 72–30, leading to Carey's 212th win at West Virginia, and his 500th career victory, after 228 wins at Salem.

Carey's team achieved their biggest win in basketball history on February 12, 2011, when they beat Notre Dame at Notre Dame 65–53. Notre Dame had only a single loss prior to the win, and was ranked # 2 in the nation, by both the AP and ESPN Coaches poll.

On March 16, 2022, Carey announced his retirement as the head coach of the WVU women's basketball team citing that he wanted to spend more time with family. He retired as the winningest women's basketball coach in the university's history and took the team to the NCAA tournament ten times.

In 2022, Carey was replaced by Dawn Plitzuweit who previously served as the head coach of the women's basketball team at the University of South Dakota. After a first-round loss in the 2023 NCAA tournament in, she announced her hiring by the University of Minnesota. In response to this, Carey announced his interest in returning as the head coach of the women's team at WVU.

=== Head coaching record ===
Record table
Season	Team	Overall	Conference	Standing	Postseason
Salem International University (West Virginia Intercollegiate Athletic Conference) (1988–2001)
1988–89	Salem	14–13	9-10	9th	
1989–90	Salem	19–12	11-9	7th	
1990–91	Salem	22–9	14-6	4th	
1991–92	Salem	9–17	7-13	11th	
1992–93	Salem	25–7	18-3	1st	NAIA District 28 Champion; NAIA 2nd Round
1993–94	Salem	24–4	17-2	1st	NAIA 2nd Round
1994–95	Salem	17–10	13-5	2nd	
1995–96	Salem	20–9	12-7	4th	
1996–97	Salem	28–3	19-0	1st	NCAA National Semifinals
1997–98	Salem	28–3	18-1	1st	NCAA East Regional Finals
1998–99	Salem	28–4	18-1	1st	NCAA National Quarterfinals
1999–00	Salem	28–4	16-3	3rd	NCAA East Regional Semifinals
2000–01	Salem	26–7	14-4	3rd	NCAA East Regional Finals
Salem:		288–102 (.738)	186–64 (.744)		
West Virginia (Big East Conference) (2001–2011)
2001–02	West Virginia	14–14	6–10	10th	
2002–03	West Virginia	15–13	4–12	T-11th	
2003–04	West Virginia	21–11	10–6	T-6th	NCAA 1st Round
2004–05	West Virginia	21–13	7–9	T-6th	WNIT Runner-up
2005–06	West Virginia	15–16	4–12	12th	
2006–07	West Virginia	21–11	11–5	4th	NCAA 2nd Round
2007–08	West Virginia	25–8	12–4	3rd	NCAA 2nd Round
2008–09	West Virginia	18–15	5–11	T-11th	WNIT 2nd round
2009–10	West Virginia	29–6	13–3	T-2nd	NCAA 2nd Round
2010–11	West Virginia	24–10	8–8	10th	NCAA 2nd Round
2011–12	West Virginia	24–10	11–5	T-4th	NCAA 2nd Round
West Virginia (Big East):		227–127 (.641)	91–76 (.545)		
West Virginia (Big 12 Conference) (2012–2022)
2012–13	West Virginia	17–14	9–9	T-5th	NCAA 1st Round
2013–14	West Virginia	30–5	16–2	T-1st	NCAA 2nd Round
2014–15	West Virginia	23–15	7–11	T–7th	WNIT Runner Up
2015–16	West Virginia	25–10	12–6	3rd	NCAA 2nd Round
2016–17	West Virginia	24–11	8–10	6th	NCAA 2nd Round
2017–18	West Virginia	25–12	8–10	6th	WNIT semifinals
2018–19	West Virginia	22–11	11–7	T-4th	WNIT 3rd Round
2019–20	West Virginia	17–12	7–11	T-6th	Postseason Cancelled
2020–21	West Virginia	22–7	13–5	T-2nd	NCAA 2nd Round
2021–22	West Virginia	15–15	7–11	7th	
West Virginia (Big 12):		219–111 (.664)	98–82 (.544)		
West Virginia (Overall):		462–254 (.645)			
Total:		735–341 (.683)			
National champion Postseason invitational champion Conference regular season champion Conference regular season and conference tournament champion Division regular season champion Division regular season and conference tournament champion Conference tournament champion

== Personal ==
Mike Carey is married to Cheryl (Minnix) Carey. Together, they have four children—Chris, Chelsy, Craig and Chelby. Chris played basketball for Fairmont State, where he won the West Virginia Intercollegiate Athletic Conference freshman of the year, an award also won by his father. Craig played on the practice team for the women's team, a team made up of men and women who serve as a practice squad for the varsity team. He is now on the West Virginia University men's basketball team. Chelsy Carey is on the cheer leading squad for the women's team. Chelby Carey played basketball for the Morgantown High School girls' basketball team.

== Awards and honors ==
- 1977 West Virginia Intercollegiate Athletic Conference freshman of the year
- 2004 Big East Coach of the Year
- 2010 Big East Coach of the Year
