= 2017 Big 12 Conference women's basketball tournament =

- Classification: Division I
- Season: 2016–17
- Teams: 10
- Site: Chesapeake Energy Arena; Oklahoma City, Oklahoma
- Champions: West Virginia (1st title)
- Winning coach: Mike Carey (1st title)
- MVP: Tynice Martin (West Virginia)
- Attendance: 17,369 (overall); 3,355 (championship)
- Television: FCS-Central, FSN, FS1

2016–17 Big 12 Conference women's basketball standings
	Conf.				Overall
Team	W		L	PCT	W		L	PCT
No. 5 Baylor	17	–	1	.944	33	–	4	.892
No. 14 Texas	15	–	3	.833	25	–	9	.735
No. 23 Oklahoma	13	–	5	.722	23	–	10	.697
No. 24 Kansas State	11	–	7	.611	23	–	11	.676
Iowa State	9	–	9	.500	18	–	13	.581
No. 22 West Virginia †	8	–	10	.444	24	–	11	.686
Oklahoma State	6	–	12	.333	17	–	15	.531
Texas Tech	5	–	13	.278	14	–	17	.452
TCU	4	–	14	.222	12	–	18	.400
Kansas	2	–	16	.111	8	–	22	.267
† 2017 Big 12 tournament winner Rankings from AP poll

The 2017 Big 12 Conference women's basketball tournament was the postseason women's basketball tournament for the Big 12 Conference that was held March 3 to 6, 2017, in Oklahoma City at Chesapeake Energy Arena. West Virginia won their first Big 12 Tournament title after upsetting #1 seeded Baylor 77-66 to win an automatic bid to the NCAA women's tournament

== Seeds ==
2017 Big 12 Conference women's basketball tournament seeds
Seed	School	Conf.	Over.	Tiebreaker
1	Baylor	17–1	28–2	
2	Texas	15–3	22–7	
3	Oklahoma	13–5	22–8	
4	Kansas State	11–7	21–9	
5	Iowa State	9–9	18–11	
6	West Virginia	8–10	20–10	
7	Oklahoma State	6–12	16–13	
8	Texas Tech	5–13	13–16	
9	TCU	4–14	12–17	
10	Kansas	2–16	8–21	
‡ – Big 12 Conference regular season champions, and tournament No. 1 seed. # - Received a single-bye in the conference tournament. Overall records include all games played in the Big 12 Conference tournament.

== Schedule ==
Session	Game	Time	Matchup	Television	Attendance
First round – Friday, March 3
1	1	6:03 pm	#8 Texas Tech 76 vs #9 TCU 58	FCS-Central	3,267
1	2	8:39 pm	#7 Oklahoma State 79 vs #10 Kansas 75	FCS-Central	3,267
Quarterfinals – Saturday, March 4
2	3	11:03 am	#4 Kansas State 74 vs #5 Iowa State 67	FSN	3,420
2	4	1:33 pm	#1 Baylor 95 vs #8 Texas Tech 63	FSN	3,420
3	5	6:04 pm	#2 Texas 71 vs #7 Oklahoma State 60	FSN	3,852
3	6	8:34 pm	#6 West Virginia 82 vs #3 Oklahoma 58	FSN	3,852
Semifinals – Sunday, March 5
4	7	1:34 pm	#1 Baylor 88 vs #4 Kansas State 71	FS1	3,475
4	8	4:04 pm	#6 West Virginia 62 vs #2 Texas 59	FS1	3,475
Final – Monday, March 6
5	9	8:04 pm	#6 West Virginia 77 vs #1 Baylor 66	FS1	3,355
Game times in CT. #-Rankings denote tournament seed

== Bracket ==
First round Friday, March 3 FCS
9	TCU	58
8	Texas Tech	76
7	Oklahoma State	79
10	Kansas	75

Quarterfinals; Saturday, March 4 FSN
1	Baylor	95
8	Texas Tech	63
4	Kansas State	74
5	Iowa State	67
2	Texas	71
7	Oklahoma State	60
3	Oklahoma	58
6	West Virginia	82

Semifinals; Sunday, March 5 FS1
1	Baylor	86
4	Kansas State	71
2	Texas	59
6	West Virginia	62

Championship game Monday, March 6 FS1
1	Baylor	66
6	West Virginia	77

== All-Tournament team ==
Most Outstanding Player – Tynice Martin, West Virginia

Player	Team
Tynice Martin	West Virginia
Teana Muldrow	West Virginia
Alexis Prince	Baylor
Nina Davis	Baylor
Kristy Wallace	Baylor

== See also ==
- 2017 Big 12 Conference men's basketball tournament
- 2017 NCAA Women's Division I Basketball Tournament
- 2016–17 NCAA Division I women's basketball rankings
