= FanDuel Sports Network Oklahoma =

American regional sports network

- Country: United States
- Broadcast area: Oklahoma; Nationwide (via satellite)
- Network: FanDuel Sports Network
- Headquarters: Oklahoma City, Oklahoma, U.S.

Programming
- Language: English
- Picture format: 720p (HDTV); 480i (SDTV)

Ownership
- Owner: Main Street Sports Group
- Sister channels: FanDuel Sports Network Southwest

History
- Launched: October 29, 2008
- Closed: September 30, 2026 (6 days ago)
- Former names: Fox Sports Oklahoma (2008–2021); Bally Sports Oklahoma (2021–2024)

Links
- Website: www.fanduelsportsnetwork.com

FanDuel Sports Network Oklahoma was an American regional sports network owned by Main Street Sports Group (formerly Diamond Sports Group) and operates as an affiliate of FanDuel Sports Network. The channel provided statewide coverage of sports events within the state of Oklahoma, namely the Oklahoma City Thunder, the state's major college sports teams, and high school sports.

FanDuel Sports Network Oklahoma was available on cable providers throughout Oklahoma, and nationwide on satellite via DirecTV.

== Background ==
The channel launched on October 29, 2008 as Fox Sports Oklahoma (FSOK), a spinoff of Fox Sports Southwest, which had been distributed to cable providers throughout Oklahoma since the Dallas-based network began operations as Home Sports Entertainment (HSE) in January 1983. It was created in order to serve as the cable broadcaster of the Oklahoma City Thunder, after Fox Sports Southwest acquired the broadcast rights to the NBA franchise following its relocation to Oklahoma City that year from Seattle.

It initially split the rights to Thunder game telecasts with independent station KSBI (channel 52, now a MyNetworkTV affiliate), under an agreement in which Fox Sports Oklahoma would produce a limited schedule of regular-season games (most of which aired on weekends) for the station; the Thunder signed a new multi-year broadcast agreement with Fox Sports Oklahoma on August 3, 2010, rendering the team's games cable-exclusive beginning with the 2010-11 season.

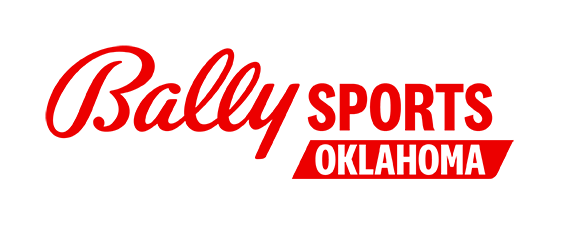
Former logo as Bally Sports Oklahoma, used from March 31, 2021 to October 20, 2024.

On December 14, 2017, as part of a merger between both companies, The Walt Disney Company announced plans to acquire all 22 regional Fox Sports networks from 21st Century Fox, including Fox Sports Oklahoma. However, on June 27, 2018, the Justice Department ordered their divestment under antitrust grounds, citing Disney's ownership of ESPN. On May 3, 2019, Sinclair Broadcast Group and Entertainment Studios (through their joint venture, Diamond Holdings) bought Fox Sports Networks from The Walt Disney Company for $10.6 billion. The deal closed on August 22, 2019, thus placing Fox Sports Oklahoma in common ownership with Sinclair stations KOKH-TV/KOCB in the network's homebase of Oklahoma City, and KTUL in Tulsa. It was subsequently renamed Bally Sports Oklahoma on March 31, 2021.

On March 14, 2023, Diamond Sports filed for Chapter 11 Bankruptcy.

On October 16, 2024, it was revealed in a court filing that Diamond had reached a new sponsorship agreement with FanDuel Group, under which it intended to rebrand Bally Sports as the FanDuel Sports Network; on October 18, 2024, Diamond officially announced the rebranding, which took effect October 21. Under the agreement, FanDuel has the option to take a minority equity stake of up to 5% once Diamond Sports exits bankruptcy. The branding is downplayed during programming related to high school sports.

== Programming ==
In addition to holding the regional television rights to the Thunder's regular season and any early-round playoff games, FanDuel Sports Network Oklahoma also holds exclusive broadcast rights to state football, basketball and baseball championships held by the Oklahoma Secondary School Activities Association. FanDuel Sports Network Oklahoma has broadcast Class A-6A Football Championship games and periodically runs OSSAA Championship Spotlight, a magazine program that highlights various high school sports depending on the time of year.

FanDuel Sports Network Oklahoma also broadcasts pre-game and post-game shows for the Oklahoma City Thunder (under the Thunder Live banner), and Oklahoma Sooners-related programs (such as coaches' shows and team magazine programs). Outside of programming exclusive to FanDuel Sports Network Oklahoma, the channel runs various programs supplied by FanDuel Sports Network Southwest (including sports interview, magazine and analysis programs focusing on Texas sports) as well as some game telecasts including the Texas Rangers of Major League Baseball and the Dallas Wings of the WNBA. Until the National Hockey League franchise reached a deal with Tegna to broadcast their games on Dallas–Fort Worth station KFAA-TV effective with the 2024–25 season, the network also carried select Dallas Stars hockey games from the Southwest feed.

From 2012 to 2022, it held tier 3 rights to the Oklahoma Sooners of the Big 12 Conference under the Sooner Sports TV branding, which gave it rights to one football game per-season, four men's basketball games per-season, and other selected athletics events. The football game was not aired on the channel itself, but distributed via pay-per-view—an arrangement that proved controversial among fans. In 2022, the team signed with ESPN+, which held the tier 3 rights to all other Big 12 teams besides the Texas Longhorns—which had a separate deal with ESPN to run the regional sports network Longhorn Network. The agreement lasted until the 2025 season, when both the Sooners and Longhorns moved to the Southeastern Conference (SEC)—whose rights are held exclusively by ESPN.

== Other services ==
=== FanDuel Sports Network Oklahoma Extra ===
FanDuel Sports Network Oklahoma Extra is an alternate feed of FanDuel Sports Network Oklahoma used to broadcast select events within the designated market that cannot air on the main feed due to scheduling conflicts.

FanDuel Sports Network Oklahoma Extra primarily serves an overflow feed in the event that teams whose games FanDuel Sports Network Oklahoma has the right to broadcast play conflicting games simultaneously, mainly those that are televised on FanDuel Sports Network Southwest that may otherwise also air on FanDuel Sports Network Oklahoma (such as Texas Rangers baseball or Dallas Stars hockey) are scheduled to be held at the same time as the scheduled telecast of a Thunder or Sooners game, or a high school or collegiate sporting event involving an Oklahoma team.

On some cable systems in Oklahoma, FanDuel Sports Network Oklahoma Extra airs St. Louis Cardinals telecasts from FanDuel Sports Network Midwest and select Kansas City Royals telecasts from FanDuel Sports Network Kansas City to the fans of those teams living in Oklahoma who otherwise cannot receive Cardinals or Royals games directly from the Midwest and Kansas City feeds. In extremely rare times, telecasts from the two teams may also air on FanDuel Sports Network Oklahoma as well depending on the schedule. FanDuel Sports Network Oklahoma Extra also carries select Dallas Mavericks telecasts from FanDuel Sports Network Southwest, except in the immediate Oklahoma City area due to NBA territorial restrictions.
