= Wendy Schuller =

American basketball coach

Biographical details
- Born: Redlands, California, U.S.
- Education: Fresno Pacific University

Playing career
- 1988–1992: Fresno Pacific
- Position: Shooting guard

Coaching career (HC unless noted)
- 1997–2001: Northwestern State (associate)
- 2001–2021: Eastern Washington

Head coaching record
- Overall: 271–305 (.470)
- Tournaments: 1–8 (NCAA)

Accomplishments and honors

Awards
- Big Sky Coach of the Year (2010)

Wendy Luebbers Schuller is an American basketball coach who was, until 2021, the head coach for the Eastern Washington Eagles women's basketball team, a position she had held since 2001.

Born in Redlands, California, Schuller attended and played for Fresno Pacific University as a shooting guard for the Sunbirds. Before graduating in 1992, she was selected as an NAIA Academic All-American.

As coach at Eastern Washington, Schuller has advanced to the Big Sky Conference tournament 16 times. She led the 2009–10 team to the program's first-ever Big Sky regular-season championship, and then to the program's first Women's National Invitation Tournament appearance that same season and in the 2012–13 and 2014–15 seasons.

Schuller's husband Mark is the city administrator in Cheney, Washington, where they reside. They are parents of three children.

== Head coaching record ==
Record table
Season	Team	Overall	Conference	Standing	Postseason
Eastern Washington (Big Sky) (2001–2021)
2001–02	Eastern Washington	11–18	6–8	5th	
2002–03	Eastern Washington	17–12	7–7	5th	
2003–04	Eastern Washington	13–16	5–9	6th	
2004–05	Eastern Washington	16–12	8–6	4th	
2005–06	Eastern Washington	13–15	7–7	T–4th	
2006–07	Eastern Washington	10–19	5–11	7th	
2007–08	Eastern Washington	4–25	1–15	9th	
2008–09	Eastern Washington	10–19	5–11	7th	
2009–10	Eastern Washington	19–12	12–4	1st	WNIT 1st Round
2010–11	Eastern Washington	13–18	8–8	6th	
2011–12	Eastern Washington	16–14	10–6	3rd	
2012–13	Eastern Washington	19–13	14–6	3rd	WNIT 1st Round
2013–14	Eastern Washington	16–14	12–8	4th	
2014–15	Eastern Washington	21–12	12–6	T–3rd	WNIT 2nd Round
2015–16	Eastern Washington	20–12	13–5	2nd	
2016–17	Eastern Washington	19–14	12–6	4th	WBI 2nd Round
2017–18	Eastern Washington	17–14	12–6	4th	
2018–19	Eastern Washington	13–20	9–11	6th	
2019–20	Eastern Washington	4–26	3–17	10th	
2020–21	Eastern Washington	6–17	5–12	9th	
Eastern Washington:		277–322 (.462)	166–169 (.496)		
Total:		277–322 (.462)			
