= 2016–17 North Dakota Fighting Hawks women's basketball team =

Intercollegiate basketball season

2016–17 North Dakota Fighting Hawks women's basketball

Big Sky regular season co-champions

WNIT, First Round
- Conference: Big Sky Conference
- Record: 20–11 (15–3 Big Sky)
- Head coach: Travis Brewster (5th season)
- Assistant coaches: Adam Jacobson; Mallory Youngblut; Katelin Oney
- Home arena: Betty Engelstad Sioux Center

2016–17 Big Sky women's basketball standings
	Conf.				Overall
Team	W		L	PCT	W		L	PCT
Montana State †	15	–	3	.833	25	–	7	.781
North Dakota	15	–	3	.833	20	–	11	.645
Northern Colorado	14	–	4	.778	22	–	8	.733
Eastern Washington	12	–	6	.667	19	–	14	.576
Idaho	11	–	7	.611	19	–	15	.559
Idaho State	10	–	8	.556	19	–	14	.576
Portland State	8	–	10	.444	16	–	17	.485
Weber State	6	–	12	.333	13	–	18	.419
Sacramento State	6	–	12	.333	10	–	20	.333
Northern Arizona	5	–	13	.278	9	–	21	.300
Montana	4	–	14	.222	7	–	23	.233
Southern Utah	2	–	16	.111	7	–	23	.233
† 2017 Big Sky tournament winner As of March 23, 2017; Rankings from AP poll

The 2016–17 North Dakota Fighting Hawks women's basketball team represented the University of North Dakota during the 2016–17 NCAA Division I women's basketball season. The Fighting Hawks, led by fifth-year head coach Travis Brewster, played their home games at the Betty Engelstad Sioux Center. They were members of the Big Sky Conference. They finished the season 20–11, 15–3 in Big Sky play to share the Big Sky regular season championship with Montana State. They lost to Portland State in the quarterfinals of the Big Sky women's tournament. They received an automatic bid to the Women's National Invitation Tournament, where they lost to South Dakota in the first round.

== Roster ==
2016–17 North Dakota Fighting Hawks women's basketball team
Players
Coaches

Pos.	#	Name	Height	Year	Previous school	Hometown
G	0	Chastity Franklin	5 ft 8 in (1.73 m)	Jr	Cardinal Ritter HS; Johnson County CC	St. Louis, MO
G	1	Leah Szabla	5 ft 9 in (1.75 m)	Sr	Providence Academy	Brooklyn Park, MN
F	2	Holly Johnson	6 ft 0 in (1.83 m)	Sr	Minot HS; North Dakota State	Minot, ND
G	4	Jill Morton	5 ft 9 in (1.75 m)	So	Edina HS	Edina, MN
F	5	Samantha Roscoe	6 ft 3 in (1.91 m)	Sr	Newman College	Perth, Western Australia
G	10	Makailah Dyer	5 ft 9 in (1.75 m)	RS Sr	East HS; Wisconsin	Madison, WI
G	11	Grace Sawatzke	5 ft 9 in (1.75 m)	RS So	Monticello HS	Monticello, MN
G	12	Kanani Asuncion	5 ft 11 in (1.8 m)	So	Century HS	Rochester, MN
G	21	Ellie Ripplinger	5 ft 5 in (1.65 m)	RS Jr	Red River HS	Grand Forks, ND
G	22	Sydney Boike	5 ft 10 in (1.78 m)	So	Crookston HS	Crookston, MN
G	24	Bailey Strand	5 ft 10 in (1.78 m)	RS So	Kennedy Secondary	Fergus Falls, MN
G	32	Kaila Burroughs	6 ft 1 in (1.85 m)	RS So	St. Cloud Tech; Denver	St. Cloud, MN
F	34	Lexi Klabo	6 ft 2 in (1.88 m)	So	Davies HS	Fargo, ND
F	35	Fallyn Freije	6 ft 0 in (1.83 m)	So	Lakota-Edmore HS	Edmore, ND
F/C	45	Ally Gorres	6 ft 2 in (1.88 m)	Fr	Park HS	Cottage Grove, MN

Head coach

- Travis Brewster (Charleston Southern)

Assistant coach(es)

- Adam Jacobson (North Dakota)
- Mallory Youngblut (North Dakota)
- Katelin Oney (Northern Iowa)

Legend

- (C) Team captain
- (S) Suspended
- (I) Ineligible
- (W) Walk-on
- Injured
- Current redshirt

Roster

== Schedule ==
Date time, TV	Rank^{#}	Opponent^{#}	Result	Record	Site (attendance) city, state
Exhibition
11/06/2016*; 7:00 pm		Minnesota–Crookston	W 83–48		Betty Engelstad Sioux Center (1,486); Grand Forks, ND
Non-conference regular season
11/11/2016*; 3:00 pm		Drake	L 91–99	0–1	Betty Engelstad Sioux Center (2,362); Grand Forks, ND
11/13/2016*; 2:00 pm, FSNOR+		at Texas Tech	L 80–90	0–2	United Supermarkets Arena (4,232); Lubbock, TX
11/16/2016*; 7:30 pm, MidcoSN/FCSA		Iowa	L 60–75	0–3	Betty Engelstad Sioux Center (2,261); Grand Forks, ND
11/22/2016*; 7:00 pm		Mayville State	W 70–43	1–3	Betty Engelstad Sioux Center (1,460); Grand Forks, ND
11/27/2016*; 2:00 pm, ESPN3		at Kansas	L 71–76 ^{OT}	1–4	Allen Fieldhouse (1,992); Lawrence, KS
12/03/2016*; 2:00 pm		San Francisco	W 71–63	2–4	Betty Engelstad Sioux Center (1,447); Grand Forks, ND
12/06/2016*; 7:00 pm, MidcoSN/FCSP		South Dakota State	L 72–83	2–5	Betty Engelstad Sioux Center (1,448); Grand Forks, ND
12/10/2016*; 7:00 pm, MidcoSN2		at North Dakota State	W 76–55	3–5	Scheels Center (1,319); Fargo, ND
12/13/2016*; 7:00 pm		Mary	W 79–67	4–5	Betty Engelstad Sioux Center (1,264); Grand Forks, ND
12/18/2016*; 2:00 pm		at Northern Iowa	L 53–74	4–6	McLeod Center (1,094); Cedar Falls, IA
12/21/2016*; 7:00 pm		at San Diego	L 61–65	5–6	Jenny Craig Pavilion (277); San Diego, CA
Big Sky regular season
12/29/2016; 7:00 pm		Portland State	W 65–61	6–6 (1–0)	Betty Engelstad Sioux Center (1,435); Grand Forks, ND
12/31/2016; 2:00 pm		Sacramento State	W 94–71	7–6 (2–0)	Betty Engelstad Sioux Center (1,405); Grand Forks, ND
01/05/2017; 7:30 pm		at Northern Arizona	W 80–78	8–6 (3–0)	Walkup Skydome (131); Flagstaff, AZ
01/07/2017; 5:00 pm		at Southern Utah	W 68–65	9–6 (4–0)	Centrum Arena (732); Cedar City, UT
01/12/2017; 7:00 pm, FSNOR/FCSC		Montana State	L 71–74 ^{OT}	9–7 (4–1)	Betty Engelstad Sioux Center (1,595); Grand Forks, ND
01/14/2017; 2:00 pm, MidcoSN/FCSP		Montana	W 73–63	10–7 (5–1)	Betty Engelstad Sioux Center (1,893); Grand Forks, ND
01/19/2017; 8:00 pm		at Weber State	W 70–65	11–7 (6–1)	Dee Events Center (607); Ogden, UT
01/21/2017; 3:00 pm		at Idaho State	W 65–62 ^{OT}	12–7 (7–1)	Reed Gym (893); Pocatello, ID
01/26/2017; 7:00 pm, MidcoSN/FCSC		Southern Utah	W 75–70	13–7 (8–1)	Betty Engelstad Sioux Center (1,563); Grand Forks, ND
01/28/2017; 2:00 pm, FSNOR/FCSC		Northern Arizona	W 88–69	14–7 (9–1)	Betty Engelstad Sioux Center (1,802); Grand Forks, ND
02/04/2017; 12:00 pm		at Northern Colorado	W 57–51	15–7 (10–1)	Bank of Colorado Arena (2,133); Greeley, CO
02/09/2017; 8:00 pm		at Eastern Washington	W 75–71	16–7 (11–1)	Reese Court (795); Cheney, WA
02/11/2017; 4:00 pm		at Idaho	L 61–74	16–8 (11–2)	Cowan Spectrum (435); Moscow, ID
02/16/2017; 7:00 pm, MidcoSN/FCSC		Idaho State	W 63–56	17–8 (12–2)	Betty Engelstad Sioux Center (1,710); Grand Forks, ND
02/18/2017; 2:00 pm		Weber State	W 83–67	18–8 (13–2)	Betty Engelstad Sioux Center (1,682); Grand Forks, ND
02/25/2017; 2:00 pm, FSNOR+/FCSP		Northern Colorado	W 75–68	19–8 (14–2)	Betty Engelstad Sioux Center (2,375); Grand Forks, ND
03/01/2017; 9:00 pm		at Sacramento State	W 92–78	20–8 (15–2)	Hornets Nest (314); Sacramento, CA
03/03/2017; 9:00 pm		at Portland State	L 67–81	20–9 (15–3)	Peter Stott Center (323); Portland, OR
Big Sky tournament
03/08/2017; 7:35 pm	(2)	vs. (7) Portland State; Quarterfinals	L 62–65	20–10	Reno Events Center (804); Reno, NV
WNIT
03/16/2017*; 7:00 pm, MidcoSN		at South Dakota; First Round	L 55–78	20–11	Sanford Coyote Sports Center (2,034); Vermillion, SD
*Non-conference game. ^{#}Rankings from AP Poll. (#) Tournament seedings in parentheses. All times are in Central Time.

== See also ==
- 2016–17 North Dakota Fighting Hawks men's basketball team
