= 2017 Big Sky Conference women's basketball tournament =

- Classification: Division I
- Season: 2016–17
- Teams: 12
- Site: Reno Events Center; Reno, NV
- Champions: Montana State (2nd title)
- Winning coach: Tricia Binford (1st title)
- MVP: Peyton Ferris (Montana State)
- Attendance: 6,153
- Television: Watch Big Sky

2016–17 Big Sky women's basketball standings
	Conf.				Overall
Team	W		L	PCT	W		L	PCT
Montana State †	15	–	3	.833	25	–	7	.781
North Dakota	15	–	3	.833	20	–	11	.645
Northern Colorado	14	–	4	.778	22	–	8	.733
Eastern Washington	12	–	6	.667	19	–	14	.576
Idaho	11	–	7	.611	19	–	15	.559
Idaho State	10	–	8	.556	19	–	14	.576
Portland State	8	–	10	.444	16	–	17	.485
Weber State	6	–	12	.333	13	–	18	.419
Sacramento State	6	–	12	.333	10	–	20	.333
Northern Arizona	5	–	13	.278	9	–	21	.300
Montana	4	–	14	.222	7	–	23	.233
Southern Utah	2	–	16	.111	7	–	23	.233
† 2017 Big Sky tournament winner As of March 23, 2017; Rankings from AP poll

The 2017 Big Sky Conference women's basketball tournament was a tournament that held from March 6–11, 2017 at the Reno Events Center. Montana State won their 2nd conference tournament title for the first time since 1993 and earned an automatic trip to the 2017 NCAA tournament.

== Seeds ==
Big Sky Tiebreaker procedures are as follows:

1. Head-to-head
2. Performance against conference teams in descending order to finish
3. Higher RPI
4. Coin Flip

Seed	School	Conference	Overall*	Tiebreaker
1	Montana State	15–3	22–6	1-0 vs. North Dakota
2	North Dakota	15–3	20–9	0–1 vs. Montana State
3	Northern Colorado	14–4	22–7	
4	Eastern Washington	12–6	17–12	
5	Idaho	11–7	16–13	
6	Idaho State	10–8	16–13	
7	Portland State	8–10	14–16	
8	Weber State	6–12	12–17	1–0 vs. Sacramento State
9	Sacramento State	6–12	10–19	0–1 vs. Weber State
10	Northern Arizona	5–13	9–20	
11	Montana	4–14	7–22	
12	Southern Utah	2–16	7–22	

* Overall record at end of regular season.

== Schedule ==
Session	Game	Time*	Matchup^{#}	Television	Attendance
First Round – Monday, March 6
1	1	12:05 PM	#8 Weber State vs. #9 Sacramento State	Watch Big Sky	863
1	2	2:35 PM	#5 Idaho vs. #12 Southern Utah	Watch Big Sky	672
2	3	5:35 PM	#7 Portland State vs. #10 Northern Arizona	Watch Big Sky	906
2	4	8:05 PM	#6 Idaho State vs. #11 Montana	Watch Big Sky	906
Quarterfinals – Wednesday, March 8
3	5	12:05 PM	#1 Montana State vs. #8 Weber State	Watch Big Sky	787
3	6	2:35 PM	#4 Eastern Washington vs. #5 Idaho	Watch Big Sky	787
4	7	5:35 PM	#2 North Dakota vs. #7 Portland State	Watch Big Sky	804
4	8	8:05 PM	#3 Northern Colorado vs. #6 Idaho State	Watch Big Sky	804
Semifinals – Friday, March 10
5	9	12:05 PM	#1 Montana State vs. #4 Eastern Washington	Watch Big Sky	1,202
5	10	2:35 PM	#7 Portland State vs. #6 Idaho State	Watch Big Sky	1,202
Championship Game – Saturday, March 11
6	11	12:05 PM	#1 Montana State vs. #6 Idaho State	Watch Big Sky	919
*Game Times in PT.

== Bracket ==
First round Monday, March 6 Watch Big Sky
8	Weber State	98 (OT)
9	Sacramento State	97
5	Idaho	83
12	Southern Utah	68
7	Portland State	88
10	Northern Arizona	76
6	Idaho State	63
11	Montana	53

Quarterfinals; Wednesday, March 8 Watch Big Sky
1	Montana State	65
8	Weber State	53
4	Eastern Washington	73
5	Idaho	64
2	North Dakota	62
7	Portland State	65
3	Northern Colorado	59
6	Idaho State	60

Semifinals; Friday, March 10; Watch Big Sky
1	Montana State	61
4	Eastern Washington	59
7	Portland State	50
6	Idaho State	54

Championship; Saturday, March 11; Watch Big Sky
1	Montana State	62
6	Idaho State	56

== See also ==
- 2017 Big Sky Conference men's basketball tournament
