= 2016–17 Lamar Lady Cardinals basketball team =

Intercollegiate basketball season

2016–17 Lamar Lady Cardinals basketball

WBI, first round
- Conference: Southland Conference
- Record: 22–8 (15–3 Southland)
- Head coach: Robin Harmony (4th season)
- Assistant coaches: Randy Schneider (4th season); Candace Walker (4th season); Cameron Miles (1st season)
- Home arena: Montagne Center (Capacity: 10,080)

For information on all Lamar University sports, see Lamar Cardinals and Lady Cardinals

2016–17 Southland Conference women's basketball standings
	Conf.				Overall
Team	W		L	PCT	W		L	PCT
Central Arkansas†	16	–	2	.889	26	–	5	.839
Abilene Christian*	16	–	2	.889	23	–	9	.719
Lamar	15	–	3	.833	22	–	8	.733
Stephen F. Austin	14	–	4	.778	25	–	8	.758
New Orleans	9	–	9	.500	14	–	15	.483
McNeese State	8	–	10	.444	14	–	17	.452
Texas A&M-CC	8	–	10	.444	14	–	18	.438
Northwestern State	7	–	11	.389	13	–	17	.433
Nicholls State	7	–	11	.389	10	–	20	.333
Incarnate Word*	7	–	11	.389	9	–	20	.310
Houston Baptist	4	–	14	.222	6	–	22	.214
SE Louisiana	3	–	15	.167	5	–	24	.172
Sam Houston State	3	–	15	.167	3	–	25	.107
† 2017 Southland tournament winner As of March 20, 2017 *ineligible for conference and NCAA tournament postseason play due to Div. I transition Rankings from AP poll

The 2016–17 Lamar Lady Cardinals basketball team represented Lamar University during the 2016–17 NCAA Division I women's basketball season. The Lady Cardinals, led by fourth-year head coach Robin Harmony, played their home games at the Montagne Center and are members of the Southland Conference. They finished the season with a 21–6 overall record, 15–3 in Southland play. They lost in the semifinals of the Southland women's tournament to Stephen F. Austin. They were invited to the WBI where they lost to Rice in the first round.

== Previous season ==
The Lady Cardinals finished the 2015–16 season with a 12–19 overall record and a 7–11 conference record. Qualifying for the conference tournament, the Lady Cardinals won the first game against Houston Baptist and were eliminated by McNeese State.

Two Lady Cardinals were recognized by the Southland Conference at the conclusion of the regular season. Chastadie Barrs was named Southland Conference Defensive Player of the Year. Kiara Desamours was named Southland Conference Freshman of the Year. Both players also received conference honorable mention honors.

== Roster ==
2016–17 Lamar Lady Cardinals women's basketball team
Players
Coaches

Pos.	#	Name	Height	Year	Previous school	Hometown
G	1	Ivana Boyd	5 ft 5 in (1.65 m)	Fr	Palm Gulf Coast HS	Palatka, FL
G	2	Bre'Osha Scott	5 ft 5 in (1.65 m)	Fr	Lakeview Centennial HS	Garland, TX
F	3	Kyla Green	5 ft 10 in (1.78 m)	Fr	Overton HS	Memphis, TN
	4	Briana Laidler	6 ft 1 in (1.85 m)	Fr	Spruce Creek HS	Port Orange, FL
G	5	Balleigh O'Dell	5 ft 5 in (1.65 m)	Jr	Verdigris HS	Claremore, OK
G	10	Chastadie Barrs	5 ft 8 in (1.73 m)	So	DeSoto HS	DeSoto, TX
F	12	Kiara Desamours	5 ft 9 in (1.75 m)	So	Dunbar HS	Fort Myers, FL
G	13	Teleshia Riley	5 ft 9 in (1.75 m)	Jr	St. Edmond Campion Secondary; Tallahassee Community College	Brampton, ON
G	14	Meagan Perry	5 ft 6 in (1.68 m)	Jr	Goose Memorial HS; Southwestern Christian College	Baytown, TX
G	15	DeJa Roberts	5 ft 7 in (1.7 m)	So	Nova HS	Davie, FL
G	22	DeA'ngela Mathis	6 ft 0 in (1.83 m)	Jr	Southeast HS	Bradenton, FL
G	23	Moe Kinard	5 ft 9 in (1.75 m)	RS So	New Iberia HS; Houston	New Iberia, LA
G	24	Ashlan Miles	5 ft 9 in (1.75 m)	Fr	Dallas Christian HS	Dallas, TX
G	32	Khali Pippins-Tyron	5 ft 8 in (1.73 m)	So	Duncanville HS	Duncanville, TX
C	33	Kiandra Bowers	5 ft 11 in (1.8 m)	Sr	Dwyer HS	West Palm Beach, FL
C	45	Lejha Smith	6 ft 0 in (1.83 m)	Jr	Coral Springs Charter School	Fort Lauderdale, FL

Head coach

- Robin Harmony (Miami (FL))

Assistant coach(es)

- Randy Schneider (FIU)
- Candace Walker (UNC Wilmington)
- Cameron Miles (San Diego)

Legend

- (C) Team captain
- (S) Suspended
- (I) Ineligible
- (W) Walk-on
- Injured
- Current redshirt

Roster
Last update: July 6, 2024

== Schedule ==
Date time, TV	Rank^{#}	Opponent^{#}	Result	Record	High points	High rebounds	High assists	Site (attendance) city, state
Non-conference schedule
November 11, 2016*; 4:00 p.m.		at No. 25 Oregon State	L 56–88	0–1	12 – M. Kinard	10 – K. Bowers	6 – C. Barrs	Gill Coliseum (3,076); Corvallis, OR
November 13, 2016*; 4:00 p.m.		at Oregon	L 67–84	0–2	17 – Kinard	5 – tied	4 – Barrs	Matthew Knight Arena (2,098); Eugene, OR
November 16, 2016*; 7:00 p.m., ESPN3		St. Thomas (TX)	W 95–49	1–3	20 – O'Dell	8 – Bowers	6 – Barrs	Montagne Center (702); Beaumont, TX
November 20, 2016*; 1:00 p.m.		at Kansas State	L 43–68	1–3	13 – Kinard	16 – Bowers	6 – Barrs	Bramlage Coliseum (4,156); Manhattan, KS
November 23, 2016*; 7:00 p.m., ESPN3		Northern Arizona	W 75–60	2–3	21 – Kinard	11 – Desamours	8 – Barrs	Montagne Center (563); Beaumont, TX
November 26, 2016*; 12:00 p.m., ESPN3		at Canisius	W 65–51	3–3	18 – tied	11 – Desamours	7 – Barrs	Koessler Athletic Center (707); Buffalo, NY
December 4, 2016*; 12:00 p.m., ESPN3		Southwestern University	W 87–41	4–3	21 – O'Dell	12 – Bowers	10 – Barrs	Montagne Center (543); Beaumont, TX
December 20, 2016*; 7:00 p.m., ESPN3		Loyola (Chicago)	W 76–50	5–3	13 – tied	11 – Bowers	6 – tied	Montagne Center (537); Beaumont, TX
December 22, 2016*; 7:00 p.m., ESPN3		Louisiana College	W 94–55	6–3	27 – Kinard	10 – Kinard	5 – Barrs	Montagne Center; Beaumont, TX
December 29, 2016*; 5:30 p.m., ESPN3		Howard Payne	W 93–56	7–3	17 – Bowers	14 – Bowers	8 – Barrs	Montagne Center (706); Beaumont, TX
Conference schedule
December 31, 2016; 2:00 p.m.		at Central Arkansas	W 70–56	8–3 (1–0)	25 – Kinard	8 – Barrs	4 – Barrs	Farris Center (612); Conway, AR
January 5, 2017; 5:30 p.m., ESPN3		New Orleans	W 73–42	9–3 (2–0)	19 – Miles	14 – Bowers	9 – Barrs	Montagne Center (631); Beaumont, TX
January 7, 2017; 2:00 p.m., ESPN3		Southeastern Louisiana	W 86–68	10–3 (3–0)	31 – Kinard	13 – Bowers	9 – Barrs	Montagne Center (706); Beaumont, TX
January 12, 2017; 7:00 p.m., ESPN3		Incarnate Word	W 83–54	11–3 (4–0)	21 – Kinard	11 – Bowers	7 – Barrs	Montagne Center (624); Beaumont, TX
January 14, 2017; 2:00 p.m., ESPN3		at Abilene Christian	L 59–77	11–4 (4–1)	14 – Barrs	8 – Bowers	7 – Barrs	Moody Coliseum (1,014); Abilene, TX
January 18, 2017; 6:30 p.m.		at Sam Houston State	W 70–44	12–4 (5–1)	19 – Bowers	10 – Bowers	6 – Barrs	Bernard Johnson Coliseum (645); Huntsville, TX
January 21, 2017; 1:00 p.m.		at Nicholls	L 67–78	12–5 (5–2)	18 – Bowers	12 – Bowers	4 – Barrs	Stopher Gym (409); Thibodaux, LA
January 25, 2017; 5:15 p.m., ESPN3		Texas A&M–Corpus Christi	W 65–49	13–5 (6–2)	21 – Kinard	8 – Bowers	8 – Barrs	Montagne Center (845); Beaumont, TX
January 28, 2017; 2:00 p.m., ESPN3		Northwestern State	W 73–60	14–5 (7–2)	20 – Kinard	15 – Bowers	7 – Barrs	Montagne Center (778); Beaumont, TX
February 2, 2017; 7:00 p.m.		at New Orleans	W 66–55	15–5 (8–2)	17 – Kinard	16 – Bowers	8 – Barrs	Lakefront Arena (118); New Orleans, LA
February 4, 2017; 2:00 p.m., ESPN3		McNeese State; Battle of the Border	W 79–57	16–5 (9–2)	30 – Bowers	12 – Bowers	7 – Barrs	Montagne Center (921); Beaumont, TX
February 9, 2017; 5:30 p.m., ESPN3		Sam Houston State	W 84–51	17–5 (10–2)	17 – Bowers	10 – Bowers	9 – Barrs	Montagne Center (818); Beaumont, TX
February 11, 2017; 3:30 p.m., ESPN3		at Stephen F. Austin	L 66–74	17–6 (10–3)	16 – Barrs	10 – Bowers	3 – Miles	William R. Johnson Coliseum (1,892); Nacogdoches, TX
February 15, 2017; 7:00 p.m.		at Houston Baptist	W 81–53	18–6 (11–3)	32 – Bowers	11 – Bowers	7 – Barrs	Sharp Gym (133); Houston, TX
February 18, 2017; 2:00 p.m.		at Texas A&M–Corpus Christi	W 74–63	19–6 (12–3)	14 – Desamours	5 – tied	5 – Barrs	American Bank Center (846); Corpus Christi, TX
February 25, 2017; 2:00 p.m., ESPN3		Houston Baptist	W 74–22	20–6 (13–3)	13 – Bowers	11 – Barrs	8 – Barrs	Montagne Center (643); Beaumont, TX
March 1, 2017; 7:00 p.m., ESPN3		Nicholls	W 81–77	21–6 (14–3)	18 – Barrs	14 – Barrs	8 – Barrs	Montagne Center (897); Beaumont, TX
March 4, 2017; 1:00 p.m.		at McNeese State; Battle of the Border	W 83–67	22–6 (15–3)	22 – Kinard	8 – tied	10 – Barrs	Burton Coliseum (489); Lake Charles, LA
Southland tournament
March 11, 2017; 3:30 p.m., ESPN3	(2)	vs. (3) Stephen F. Austin; Semifinals	L 48–62	22–7	8 – 4 tied	14 – Bowers	3 – tied	Merrell Center (306); Katy, TX
WBI
March 16, 2017*; 7:00 p.m.		at Rice; First round	L 72–73	22–8	16 – 4 tied	10 – Bowers	4 – Barrs	Tudor Fieldhouse (306); Houston, TX
*Non-conference game. ^{#}Rankings from AP poll. (#) Tournament seedings in parentheses. All times are in Central.

== See also ==
- 2016–17 Lamar Cardinals basketball team
