= 2016–17 Montana State Bobcats women's basketball team =

Intercollegiate basketball season

2016–17 Montana State Bobcats women's basketball
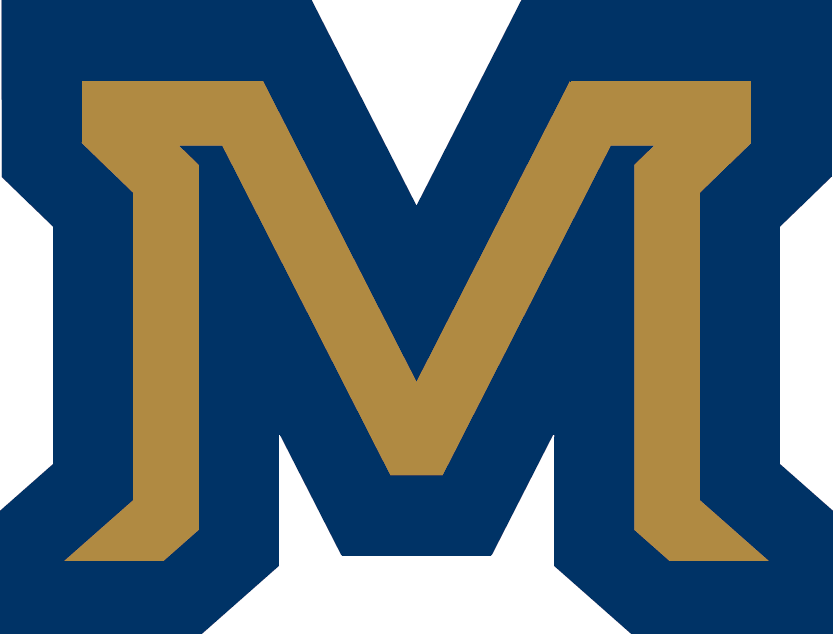

Big Sky regular season co-champions and Tournament Champions

NCAA Women's Tournament, first round
- Conference: Big Sky Conference
- Record: 25–7 (15–3 Big Sky)
- Head coach: Tricia Binford (11th season)
- Associate head coach: Nate Harris
- Assistant coaches: Kati Burrows; Julian Assibey
- Home arena: Brick Breeden Fieldhouse

2016–17 Big Sky women's basketball standings
	Conf.				Overall
Team	W		L	PCT	W		L	PCT
Montana State †	15	–	3	.833	25	–	7	.781
North Dakota	15	–	3	.833	20	–	11	.645
Northern Colorado	14	–	4	.778	22	–	8	.733
Eastern Washington	12	–	6	.667	19	–	14	.576
Idaho	11	–	7	.611	19	–	15	.559
Idaho State	10	–	8	.556	19	–	14	.576
Portland State	8	–	10	.444	16	–	17	.485
Weber State	6	–	12	.333	13	–	18	.419
Sacramento State	6	–	12	.333	10	–	20	.333
Northern Arizona	5	–	13	.278	9	–	21	.300
Montana	4	–	14	.222	7	–	23	.233
Southern Utah	2	–	16	.111	7	–	23	.233
† 2017 Big Sky tournament winner As of March 23, 2017; Rankings from AP poll

The 2016–17 Montana State Bobcats women's basketball team represented Montana State University during the 2016–17 NCAA Division I women's basketball season. The Bobcats, led by eleventh year head coach Tricia Binford, played their home games at Brick Breeden Fieldhouse and are members of the Big Sky Conference. The Bobcats won the Big Sky Conference regular season and tournament championships, earning their first NCAA Tournament appearance since 1993. They finished the season 25–7, 15–3 in Big Sky play. They lost in the first round to Washington.

== Roster ==
2016–17 Montana State Bobcats women's basketball team
Players
Coaches

Pos.	#	Name	Height	Year	Previous school	Hometown
G	2	Peyton Ferris	5 ft 9 in (1.75 m)	RS Sr	Twin Bridges	Twin Bridges, Montana
F	3	Annika Lai	6 ft 1 in (1.85 m)	So	Fairview	Boulder, Colorado
G	10	Margreet Barhoum	5 ft 6 in (1.68 m)	RS Jr	Meadowdale	Edmonds, Washington
G	11	Madisyn Shaide	5 ft 7 in (1.7 m)	Fr	Big Sky	Missoula, Montana
G	12	Delany Junkermier	6 ft 0 in (1.83 m)	Jr	Mead HS	Spokane, Washington
F	13	Ashton Siegner	6 ft 1 in (1.85 m)	RS So	West Albany	Albany, Oregon
F	15	Riley Nordgaard	5 ft 10 in (1.78 m)	RS Sr	Canby; Augustana College	Canby, Minnesota
F	22	Madison Kast	6 ft 1 in (1.85 m)	Fr	Redwood	Visalia, California
G	23	Hannah Caudill	5 ft 7 in (1.7 m)	RS Jr	Gonzaga Prep	Spokane, Washington
G	24	Madisyn Shaide	5 ft 7 in (1.7 m)	RS Fr	Big Sky	Missoula, Montana
G	24	Oliana Squires	5 ft 8 in (1.73 m)	Fr	Sand Creek	Colorado Springs, Colorado
G	30	Rebekah Hatchard	5 ft 8 in (1.73 m)	RS Jr	Windsor Gardens Vocational College; Seward CC	Adelaide, Australia
F	34	Blaire Braxton	6 ft 2 in (1.88 m)	Fr	Highlands Ranch	Highlands Ranch, Colorado
F	40	Madeline Smith	6 ft 1 in (1.85 m)	Fr	Snohomish	Snohomish, Washington

Head coach

- Tricia Binford (Boise State)

Assistant coach(es)

- Nate Harris (Montana Tech)
- Kati Burrows (Montana State)
- Julian Assibey (William Penn)

Legend

- (C) Team captain
- (S) Suspended
- (I) Ineligible
- (W) Walk-on
- Injured
- Current redshirt

Roster

== Schedule ==
Date time, TV	Rank^{#}	Opponent^{#}	Result	Record	Site (attendance) city, state
Exhibition
11/03/2016*; 5:00 pm		Rocky Mountain (MT)	W 75–43		Brick Breeden Fieldhouse (894); Bozeman, MT
11/05/2016*; 7:00 pm		Colorado Christian	W 93–53		Brick Breeden Fieldhouse (856); Bozeman, MT
Non-conference regular season
11/12/2016*; 2:00 pm		at Utah	L 64–74	0–1	Jon M. Huntsman Center (1,211); Salt Lake City, UT
11/15/2016*; 8:15 pm		at Utah State	L 56–64	0–2	Smith Spectrum (633); Logan, UT
11/20/2016*; 2:00 pm		Great Falls	W 75–43	1–2	Brick Breeden Fieldhouse (1,148); Bozeman, MT
11/23/2016*; 8:00 pm		at UC Davis	L 62–70	1–3	The Pavilion (322); Davis, CA
11/25/2016*; 7:30 pm		at Pacific; Tiger Turkey Tip-Off Thanksgiving Tournament	W 72–66	2–3	Alex G. Spanos Center (416); Stockton, CA
11/26/2016*; 2:00 pm		vs. Santa Clara; Tiger Turkey Tip-Off Thanksgiving Tournament	W 77–50	3–3	Alex G. Spanos Center; Stockton, CA
12/02/2016*; 7:00 pm		Carroll (MT)	W 75–44	4–3	Brick Breeden Fieldhouse (1,426); Bozeman, MT
12/04/2016*; 2:00 pm		Seattle	W 75–56	5–3	Brick Breeden Fieldhouse (1,418); Bozeman, MT
12/11/2016*; 1:00 pm		at Portland	W 70–66	6–3	Chiles Center (318); Portland, OR
12/20/2016*; 7:00 pm		Cal Poly	W 71–52	7–3	Brick Breeden Fieldhouse (1,243); Bozeman, MT
Big Sky regular season
12/29/2016; 7:00 pm		at Weber State	W 83–68	8–3 (1–0)	Dee Events Center (628); Ogden, UT
12/31/2016; 2:00 pm		at Idaho State	L 59–67	8–4 (1–1)	Reed Gym (826); Pocatello, ID
01/05/2017; 7:00 pm		Eastern Washington	W 88–83	9–4 (2–1)	Brick Breeden Fieldhouse (1,266); Bozeman, MT
01/07/2017; 2:00 pm		Idaho	W 80–64	10–4 (3–1)	Brick Breeden Fieldhouse (1,667); Bozeman, MT
01/12/2017; 6:00 pm		at North Dakota	W 74–71 ^{OT}	11–4 (4–1)	Betty Engelstad Sioux Center (1,595); Grand Forks, ND
01/14/2017; 2:00 pm		at Northern Colorado	L 58–66	11–5 (4–2)	Bank of Colorado Arena (879); Greeley, CO
01/19/2017; 7:00 pm		Sacramento State	W 84–80	12–5 (5–2)	Brick Breeden Fieldhouse (1,316); Bozeman, MT
01/21/2017; 2:00 pm		Portland State	W 83–76	13–5 (6–2)	Brick Breeden Fieldhouse (2,284); Bozeman, MT
01/26/2017; 7:00 pm		at Idaho	W 66–61	14–5 (7–2)	Cowan Spectrum (903); Moscow, ID
01/28/2017; 3:00 pm		at Eastern Washington	W 72–61	15–5 (8–2)	Reese Court (1,008); Cheney, WA
02/04/2017; 2:00 pm, SWX Montana		at Montana	W 75–69	16–5 (9–2)	Dahlberg Arena (3,223); Missoula, MT
02/09/2017; 7:00 pm		Northern Arizona	W 86–69	17–5 (10–2)	Brick Breeden Fieldhouse (1,546); Bozeman, MT
02/11/2017; 2:00 pm		Southern Utah	W 71–68	18–5 (11–2)	Brick Breeden Fieldhouse (1,797); Bozeman, MT
02/16/2017; 8:00 pm		at Portland State	L 65–69	18–6 (11–3)	Peter Stott Center (317); Portland, OR
02/18/2017; 3:00 pm		at Sacramento State	W 104–82	19–6 (12–3)	Hornets Nest (370); Sacramento, CA
02/25/2017; 2:00 pm, SWX Montana		Montana	W 71–54	20–6 (13–3)	Brick Breeden Fieldhouse (3,273); Bozeman, MT
03/01/2017; 7:00 pm		Idaho State	W 73–67	21–6 (14–3)	Brick Breeden Fieldhouse (1,601); Bozeman, MT
03/03/2017; 7:00 pm		Weber State	W 72–53	22–6 (15–3)	Brick Breeden Fieldhouse (2,478); Bozeman, MT
Big Sky Women's Tournament
03/08/2017; 1:05 pm	(1)	vs. (8) Weber State; Quarterfinals	W 65–53	23–6	Reno Events Center (787); Reno, NV
03/10/2017; 1:05 pm	(1)	vs. (4) Eastern Washington; Semifinals	W 61–59	24–6	Reno Events Center (1,202); Reno, NV
03/11/2017; 1:05 pm	(1)	vs. (6) Idaho State; Championship Game	W 62–56	25–6	Reno Events Center (919); Reno, NV
NCAA Women's Tournament
03/18/2017*; 8:00 pm, ESPN2	(14 O)	at (3 O) No. 11 Washington; First Round	L 63–91	25–7	Alaska Airlines Arena (8,059); Seattle, WA
*Non-conference game. ^{#}Rankings from AP Poll. (#) Tournament seedings in parentheses. O=Oklahoma City Region. All times are in Mountain Time.

== See also ==
2016–17 Montana State Bobcats men's basketball team
