= 2016–17 Northern Colorado Bears women's basketball team =

Intercollegiate basketball season

2016–17 Northern Colorado Bears women's basketball
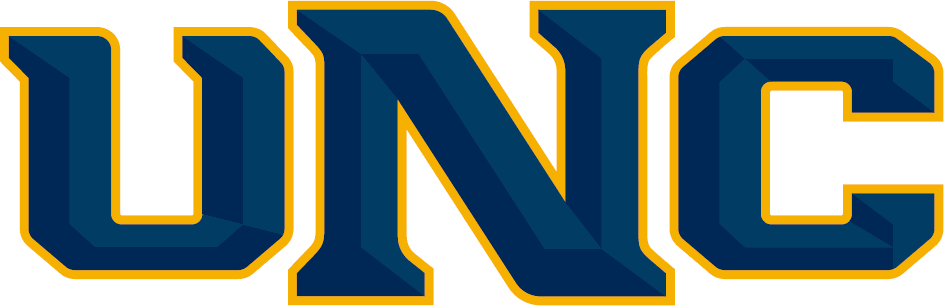
- Conference: Big Sky Conference
- Record: 22–8 (14–4 Big Sky)
- Head coach: Kamie Ethridge (3rd season)
- Assistant coaches: Kelly Moylan; Laurie Koehn; Katie Shepard
- Home arena: Bank of Colorado Arena

2016–17 Big Sky women's basketball standings
	Conf.				Overall
Team	W		L	PCT	W		L	PCT
Montana State †	15	–	3	.833	25	–	7	.781
North Dakota	15	–	3	.833	20	–	11	.645
Northern Colorado	14	–	4	.778	22	–	8	.733
Eastern Washington	12	–	6	.667	19	–	14	.576
Idaho	11	–	7	.611	19	–	15	.559
Idaho State	10	–	8	.556	19	–	14	.576
Portland State	8	–	10	.444	16	–	17	.485
Weber State	6	–	12	.333	13	–	18	.419
Sacramento State	6	–	12	.333	10	–	20	.333
Northern Arizona	5	–	13	.278	9	–	21	.300
Montana	4	–	14	.222	7	–	23	.233
Southern Utah	2	–	16	.111	7	–	23	.233
† 2017 Big Sky tournament winner As of March 23, 2017; Rankings from AP poll

The 2016–17 Northern Colorado Bears women's basketball team represented the University of Northern Colorado during the 2016–17 NCAA Division I women's basketball season. Kamie Ethridge, third-year head coach, led the Bears, and played their home games at the Bank of Colorado Arena. They finished the season 22–8, 14–4 in Big Sky play to finish in third place. They advanced to the quarterfinals of the Big Sky women's tournament where they lost to Idaho State. Despite having 22 wins and a better record, they were not invited to a postseason tournament.

== Roster ==
2016–17 Northern Colorado Bears women's basketball team
Players
Coaches

Pos.	#	Name	Height	Year	Previous school	Hometown
G	1	Krystal Leger-Walker	5 ft 9 in (1.75 m)	Fr	XXXX	New Zealand
G	2	Savannah Scott	5 ft 7 in (1.7 m)	Jr	Westmont HS	Campbell, California
G	4	Kirsten Kramer	5 ft 8 in (1.73 m)	So	Clark HS	San Antonio, Texas
G	5	Mandy Karako	5 ft 11 in (1.8 m)	Fr	Lake Travis HS	Lakeway, Texas
G	10	Savannah Smith	5 ft 6 in (1.68 m)	RS So	Fossil Ridge HS	Fort Collins, Colorado
C	13	Courtney Smith	6 ft 3 in (1.91 m)	So	Legacy HS	Thornton, Colorado
F	14	Kourteney Zadina	6 ft 2 in (1.88 m)	Sr	Seward HS	Seward, Nebraska
G	15	Katie Longwell	5 ft 6 in (1.68 m)	Sr	Chaparral HS	Parker, Colorado
G	21	Abby Kain	6 ft 1 in (1.85 m)	Fr	Simley HS	Inver Grove Heights, Minnesota
F	22	Danielle Noble	6 ft 0 in (1.83 m)	So	South HS	Cheyenne, Wyoming
C	23	Ashleen Quirke	6 ft 3 in (1.91 m)	So	Los Gatos HS	Los Gatos, California
G	33	Kianna Williams	5 ft 9 in (1.75 m)	Jr	Lake Elsinore HS	Perris, California
C	44	Bridget Hintz	6 ft 3 in (1.91 m)	Fr	Elk Rapids HS	Elk Rapids, Michigan
F/C		Ali Meyer (I) (redshirt)	6 ft 1 in (1.85 m)	Jr	Palmer Ridge HS; Colorado Christian	Monument, Colorado

Head coach

- Kamie Ethridge (Texas)

Assistant coach(es)

- Kelly Moylan (Kansas State)
- Laurie Koehn (Kansas State)
- Katie Shepard (Sacred Heart)

Legend

- (C) Team captain
- (S) Suspended
- (I) Ineligible
- (W) Walk-on
- Injured
- Current redshirt

Roster

== Schedule ==
Date time, TV	Rank^{#}	Opponent^{#}	Result	Record	Site (attendance) city, state
Exhibition
11/01/2016*; 7:00 pm		Regis	W 71–56		Bank of Colorado Arena (500); Greeley, Colorado
11/06/2016*; 12:00 pm		Black Hills State	W 79–73		Bank of Colorado Arena; Greeley, Colorado
Non-conference regular season
11/11/2016*; 7:00 pm		Colorado	L 62–83	0–1	Bank of Colorado Arena (1,071); Greeley, Colorado
11/14/2016*; 7:00 pm		Denver	W 68–48	1–1	Bank of Colorado Arena (504); Greeley, Colorado
11/18/2016*; 12:00 pm		Florida Gulf Coast	W 77–74 ^{2OT}	2–1	Bank of Colorado Arena (2,550); Greeley, Colorado
11/20/2016*; 2:00 pm		San Diego	W 54–51	3–1	Bank of Colorado Arena (502); Greeley, Colorado
11/25/2016*; 3:15 pm		at UTSA; UTSA Thanksgiving Classic	W 73–66	4–1	Convocation Center (1,057); San Antonio, Texas
11/27/2016*; 11:00 am		vs. Eastern Michigan; UTSA Thanksgiving Classic	W 58–57	5–1	Convocation Center; San Antonio, Texas
12/04/2016*; 2:00 pm		at Colorado State	L 47–58	5–2	Moby Arena (1,178); Fort Collins, Colorado
12/10/2016*; 4:00 pm		at Air Force	W 71–44	6–2	Clune Arena (375); Colorado Springs, Colorado
12/13/2016*; 7:00 pm		Colorado Christian	W 90–47	7–2	Bank of Colorado Arena (602); Greeley, Colorado
12/16/2016*; 7:30 pm		at Saint Mary's	L 65–75	7–3	McKeon Pavilion (285); Moraga, California
12/19/2016*; 8:00 pm		at Pacific	W 60–56	8–3	Alex G. Spanos Center (331); Stockton, California
Big Sky regular season
12/29/2016; 7:00 pm		Sacramento State	W 95–88	9–3 (1–0)	Bank of Colorado Arena (592); Greeley, Colorado
12/31/2016; 12:00 pm		Portland State	W 91–62	10–3 (2–0)	Bank of Colorado Arena (545); Greeley, Colorado
01/05/2017; 7:00 pm		at Southern Utah	W 83–53	11–3 (3–0)	Centrum Arena (495); Cedar City, Utah
01/07/2017; 2:00 pm		at Northern Arizona	W 69–66	12–3 (4–0)	Walkup Skydome (256); Flagstaff, Arizona
01/12/2017; 7:00 pm		Montana	W 65–46	13–3 (5–0)	Bank of Colorado Arena (820); Greeley, Colorado
01/14/2017; 2:00 pm		Montana State	W 66–58	14–3 (6–0)	Bank of Colorado Arena (879); Greeley, Colorado
01/19/2017; 7:00 pm		at Idaho State	W 77–62	15–3 (7–0)	Reed Gym (942); Pocatello, Idaho
01/21/2017; 2:00 pm		at Weber State	W 88–79	16–3 (8–0)	Dee Events Center (572); Ogden, Utah
01/26/2017; 7:00 pm		Northern Arizona	W 75–64	17–3 (9–0)	Bank of Colorado Arena (902); Greeley, Colorado
01/28/2017; 2:00 pm		Southern Utah	W 74–55	18–3 (10–0)	Bank of Colorado Arena (937); Greeley, Colorado
02/04/2017; 12:00 pm		North Dakota	L 51–57	18–4 (10–1)	Bank of Colorado Arena (2,133); Greeley, Colorado
02/09/2017; 7:00 pm		at Idaho	W 71–67	19–4 (11–1)	Cowan Spectrum (486); Moscow, Idaho
02/11/2017; 3:00 pm		at Eastern Washington	L 61–67	19–5 (11–2)	Reese Court (1,010); Cheney, Washington
02/16/2017; 7:00 pm		Weber State	W 86–62	20–5 (12–2)	Bank of Colorado Arena (1,184); Greeley, Colorado
02/18/2017; 2:00 pm		Idaho State	L 58–68	20–6 (12–3)	Bank of Colorado Arena (1,884); Greeley, Colorado
02/25/2017; 1:00 pm		at North Dakota	L 68–75	20–7 (12–4)	Betty Engelstad Sioux Center (2,375); Grand Forks, North Dakota
03/01/2017; 1:00 pm		at Portland State	W 57–50	21–7 (13–4)	Peter Stott Center (978); Portland, Oregon
03/03/2017; 8:00 pm		at Sacramento State	W 102–74	22–7 (14–4)	Hornets Nest (607); Sacramento, California
Big Sky Women's Tournament
03/08/2017; 6:35 pm	(3)	vs. (6) Idaho State; Quarterfinals	L 59–60	22–8	Reno Events Center (804); Reno, Nevada
*Non-conference game. ^{#}Rankings from AP Poll. (#) Tournament seedings in parentheses. All times are in Mountain Time.

== Rankings ==
2016–17 NCAA Division I women's basketball rankings

+ Regular season polls	Poll	Pre- Season	Week 2	Week 3	Week 4	Week 5	Week 6	Week 7	Week 8	Week 9	Week 10	Week 11	Week 12	Week 13	Week 14	Week 15	Week 16	Week 17	Week 18	Week 19	Final
AP	NR	NR	NR	NR	NR	NR	NR	NR	NR	NR	NR	NR	RV	NR	NR	NR	NR			N/A	
Coaches	NR	NR	NR	NR	NR	NR	NR	NR	NR	NR	NR	NR	NR	NR	NR	NR	NR				

Legend
	Increase in ranking
	Decrease in ranking
	Not ranked previous week
(RV)	Received Votes

== See also ==
- 2016–17 Northern Colorado Bears men's basketball team
