= 2016–17 Southern Utah Thunderbirds women's basketball team =

Intercollegiate basketball season

2016–17 Southern Utah Thunderbirds women's basketball
- Conference: Big Sky Conference
- Record: 7–23 (2–16 Big Sky)
- Head coach: Chris Boettcher (3rd season)
- Assistant coaches: Dionisio Gomez; Kim Parker Beeston; Robert Yonce
- Home arena: Centrum Arena

2016–17 Big Sky women's basketball standings
	Conf.				Overall
Team	W		L	PCT	W		L	PCT
Montana State †	15	–	3	.833	25	–	7	.781
North Dakota	15	–	3	.833	20	–	11	.645
Northern Colorado	14	–	4	.778	22	–	8	.733
Eastern Washington	12	–	6	.667	19	–	14	.576
Idaho	11	–	7	.611	19	–	15	.559
Idaho State	10	–	8	.556	19	–	14	.576
Portland State	8	–	10	.444	16	–	17	.485
Weber State	6	–	12	.333	13	–	18	.419
Sacramento State	6	–	12	.333	10	–	20	.333
Northern Arizona	5	–	13	.278	9	–	21	.300
Montana	4	–	14	.222	7	–	23	.233
Southern Utah	2	–	16	.111	7	–	23	.233
† 2017 Big Sky tournament winner As of March 23, 2017; Rankings from AP poll

The 2016–17 Southern Utah Thunderbirds women's basketball team represented Southern Utah University during the 2016–17 NCAA Division I women's basketball season. Led by third-year head coach Chris Boettcher, they played their home games at Centrum Arena. They were members of the Big Sky Conference. They finished the season 7–23, 2–16 in Big Sky play to finish in last place. They lost in the first round of the Big Sky women's tournament to Idaho.

== Roster ==
2016–17 Southern Utah Thunderbirds women's basketball team
Players
Coaches

Pos.	#	Name	Height	Year	Previous school	Hometown
G	2	Rebecca Cardenas	5 ft 5 in (1.65 m)	Fr	Burges	El Paso, TX
G/F	4	Ashley Baugh	6 ft 0 in (1.83 m)	So	American Fork; Utah Valley	American Fork, UT
F	11	Megan Kamps	6 ft 0 in (1.83 m)	Fr	Manhattan Christian	Manhattan, MT
G	14	Breanu Reid	5 ft 7 in (1.7 m)	So	Piedmont	Oklahoma City, OK
G	15	Breanu Reid	5 ft 10 in (1.78 m)	Fr	Northridge; Northern Colorado	Tuscaloosa, AL
G	20	Skylee Doman	5 ft 8 in (1.73 m)	Fr	Canby	Canby, OR
C	21	Whitney Johnson (I) (redshirt)	6 ft 2 in (1.88 m)	Sr	Lone Peak HS; New Mexico	Highland, UT
G/F	22	Tiffany Dunlap	5 ft 11 in (1.8 m)	RS Fr	Prestonwood Christian Academy	Plano, TX
F	24	Tiarra Mcdonald	5 ft 10 in (1.78 m)	So	Northside	Fort Smith, AR
G	30	Maren Herrud	5 ft 11 in (1.8 m)	So	Highland	Pocatello, ID
F	40	Darri Frandsen	6 ft 1 in (1.85 m)	So	Panguitch	Panguitch, UT
F	43	Jessica Richardson	5 ft 11 in (1.8 m)	Sr	Davis	Kaysville, UT
G	55	Jamie Smith	5 ft 7 in (1.7 m)	Sr	Riverton; USU–Eastern	Riverton, UT

Head coach

- Chris Boettcher (BYU)

Assistant coach(es)

- Dionisio Gomez (Arkansas)
- Kim Parker Beeston (BYU)
- Robert Yonce (Tennessee)

Legend

- (C) Team captain
- (S) Suspended
- (I) Ineligible
- (W) Walk-on
- Injured
- Current redshirt

Roster

== Schedule ==
Date time, TV	Rank^{#}	Opponent^{#}	Result	Record	Site (attendance) city, state
Exhibition
10/25/2016*; 6:30 pm		Colorado Mesa	W 75–70		Centrum Arena (290); Cedar City, UT
11/04/2016*; 4:00 pm		Eastern New Mexico	W 63–60		Centrum Arena (300); Cedar City, UT
Non-conference regular season
11/12/2016*; 6:30 pm		Antelope Valley	W 89–76	1–0	Centrum Arena (200); Cedar City, UT
11/15/2016*; 8:00 pm		at Cal State Bakersfield	W 65–59	2–0	Icardo Center (964); Bakersfield, CA
11/22/2016*; 5:30 pm		at Utah State	W 70–54	3–0	Smith Spectrum (854); Logan, UT
11/26/2016*; 2:00 pm		Arizona	L 65–77	3–1	Centrum Arena (225); Cedar City, UT
11/30/2016*; 7:00 pm		at Utah	L 43–69	3–2	Jon M. Huntsman Center (1,146); Salt Lake City, UT
12/02/2016*; 6:30 pm		at Wyoming	L 48–68	3–3	Arena-Auditorium (2,304); Laramie, WY
12/06/2016*; 12:00 pm		Utah Valley	L 64–70	3–4	Centrum Arena (725); Cedar City, UT
12/10/2016*; 8:00 pm		at No. 24 Oregon State	L 38–77	3–5	Gill Coliseum (2,937); Corvallis, OR
12/16/2016*; 6:30 pm		Grand Canyon	L 73–76	3–6	Centrum Arena (474); Cedar City, UT
12/19/2016*; 8:00 pm		at UC Irvine	W 70–58	4–6	Bren Events Center (202); Irvine, CA
12/21/2016*; 3:00 pm		at Cal State Northridge	W 77–71	5–6	Matadome (121); Northridge, CA
Big Sky regular season
12/31/2016; 2:00 pm		Northern Arizona	L 68–77 ^{OT}	5–7 (0–1)	Centrum Arena (576); Cedar City, UT
01/05/2017; 6:30 pm		Northern Colorado	L 53–83	5–8 (0–2)	Centrum Arena (495); Cedar City, UT
01/07/2017; 4:00 pm		North Dakota	L 65–68	5–9 (0–3)	Centrum Arena (732); Cedar City, UT
01/12/2017; 8:05 pm		at Sacramento State	L 69–81	5–10 (0–4)	Hornets Netst (275); Sacramento, CA
01/14/2017; 3:00 pm		at Portland State	L 74–81	5–11 (0–5)	Hornets Nest (278); Sacramento, CA
01/19/2017; 6:30 pm		Idaho	L 68–85	5–12 (0–6)	Centrum Arena (288); Cedar City, UT
01/21/2017; 4:00 pm		Eastern Washington	L 66–67	5–13 (0–7)	Centrum Arena (726); Cedar City, UT
01/26/2017; 6:00 pm		at North Dakota	L 70–75	5–14 (0–8)	Betty Engelstad Sioux Center (1,563); Grand Forks, ND
01/28/2017; 2:00 pm		at Northern Colorado	L 55–74	5–15 (0–9)	Bank of Colorado Arena; Greeley, CO
02/02/2017; 6:30 pm		Weber State	L 68–73	5–16 (0–10)	Centrum Arena (1,107); Cedar City, UT
02/04/2017; 6:30 pm		Idaho State	L 68–71 ^{2OT}	5–17 (0–11)	Centrum Arena (894); Cedar City, UT
02/09/2017; 7:00 pm		at Montana	L 55–64	5–18 (0–12)	Dahlberg Arena (2,843); Missoula, MT
02/11/2017; 2:00 pm		at Montana State	L 68–71	5–19 (0–13)	Worthington Arena (1,797); Bozeman, MT
02/18/2016; 2:00 pm		at Northern Arizona	L 65–77	5–20 (0–14)	Walkup Skydome (594); Flagstaff, AZ
02/23/2017; 6:30 pm		Portland State	W 82–64	6–20 (1–14)	Centrum Arena (981); Cedar City, UT
02/25/2017; 2:00 pm		Sacramento State	L 104–110	6–21 (1–15)	Centrum Arena (1,012); Cedar City, UT
03/01/2017; 7:00 pm		at Eastern Washington	W 64–63	7–21 (2–15)	Reese Court (801); Cheney, WA
03/03/2017; 7:00 pm		at Idaho	L 61–76	7–22 (2–16)	Cowan Spectrum (753); Moscow, ID
Big Sky Women's Tournament
03/06/2017; 3:35 pm	(12)	vs. (5) Idaho; First Round	L 68–83	7–23	Reno Events Center (863); Reno, NV
*Non-conference game. ^{#}Rankings from AP Poll. (#) Tournament seedings in parentheses. All times are in Mountain Time.

== See also ==
- 2016–17 Southern Utah Thunderbirds basketball team
