= 2016–17 Idaho State Bengals women's basketball team =

Intercollegiate basketball season

2016–17 Idaho State Bengals women's basketball
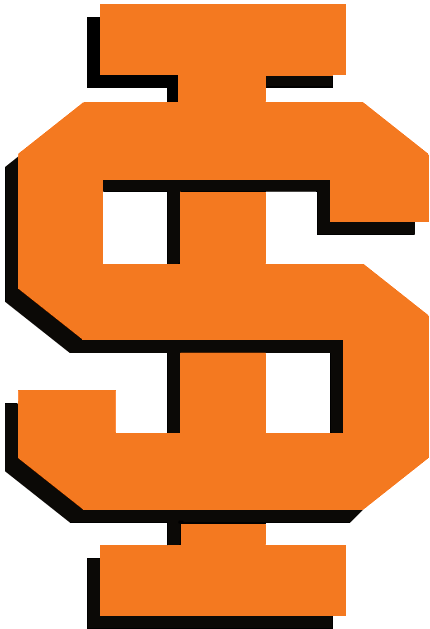
- Conference: Big Sky Conference
- Record: 19–14 (10–8 Big Sky)
- Head coach: Seton Sobolewski (9th season)
- Assistant coaches: Mike Trujillo; Ryan Johnson; Bryanna Mueller
- Home arena: Reed Gym

2016–17 Big Sky women's basketball standings
	Conf.				Overall
Team	W		L	PCT	W		L	PCT
Montana State †	15	–	3	.833	25	–	7	.781
North Dakota	15	–	3	.833	20	–	11	.645
Northern Colorado	14	–	4	.778	22	–	8	.733
Eastern Washington	12	–	6	.667	19	–	14	.576
Idaho	11	–	7	.611	19	–	15	.559
Idaho State	10	–	8	.556	19	–	14	.576
Portland State	8	–	10	.444	16	–	17	.485
Weber State	6	–	12	.333	13	–	18	.419
Sacramento State	6	–	12	.333	10	–	20	.333
Northern Arizona	5	–	13	.278	9	–	21	.300
Montana	4	–	14	.222	7	–	23	.233
Southern Utah	2	–	16	.111	7	–	23	.233
† 2017 Big Sky tournament winner As of March 23, 2017; Rankings from AP poll

The 2016–17 Idaho State Bengals women's basketball team represented Idaho State University during the 2016–17 NCAA Division I women's basketball season. The Bengals, led by ninth year head coach Seton Sobolewski, played their home games at Reed Gym. They were members of the Big Sky Conference. They finished the season 19–14, 10–8 in Big Sky play to finish in a tie for sixth place. They advanced to the championship game of the Big Sky women's tournament where they lost to their in-state rival Idaho. Despite having 19 wins, they were not invited to a postseason tournament.

== Roster ==
2016–17 Idaho State Bengals women's basketball team
Players
Coaches

Pos.	#	Name	Height	Year	Previous school	Hometown
G	1	Isabel Vara de Rey	5 ft 9 in (1.75 m)	So	Ciudad de Los Adelantados	Santa Cruz de Tenerife, Canary Islands
G	2	Grace Kenyon	6 ft 0 in (1.83 m)	RS So	Bainbridge HS	Bainbridge Island, WA
G	3	Saylair Grandon	5 ft 10 in (1.78 m)	So	Westview HS	Phoenix, AZ
G	4	Juliet Jones	5 ft 9 in (1.75 m)	Jr	Cathedral Catholic HS	San Diego, CA
G	5	Bianca Thacker	5 ft 11 in (1.8 m)	Fr	Cornerstone College, Mt. Barker	Adelaide, Australia
G	10	Freya Newton	5 ft 10 in (1.78 m)	RS Sr	Freyberg HS; Gillette College	Palmerston North, New Zealand
F	11	Sai Tapasa	6 ft 2 in (1.88 m)	RS Fr	Central HS	Monmouth, OR
G	12	Brook Blair	5 ft 8 in (1.73 m)	Sr	Rangitoto College; Northeastern Junior College	Murrays Bay, New Zealand
F	15	Irene Vicente	6 ft 2 in (1.88 m)	Fr	Rivas Promete Junior	Alcalá de Henares, Spain
F	20	April Dawson	6 ft 2 in (1.88 m)	Sr	Boulder HS	Boulder, CO
F	22	Lindsay Brown	6 ft 1 in (1.85 m)	RS Jr	Arlington HS	Arlington, WA
F	30	Megan Hochstein	6 ft 1 in (1.85 m)	RS So	Rocky Mountain HS	Meridian, ID
F	32	Jenna Morch	6 ft 2 in (1.88 m)	RS So	Lebanon HS	Lebanon, OR
F	41	Estefania Ors	5 ft 10 in (1.78 m)	RS Fr	None	Altura, Spain
G	44	Britanny Kochenderfer	5 ft 10 in (1.78 m)	So	Henley HS	Klamath Falls, OR

Head coach

- Seton Sobolewski (Northern Arizona)

Assistant coach(es)

- Michael Trujillo (Northern Arizona)
- Ryan Johnson (DePauw)
- Bryanna Mueller (Drake)

Legend

- (C) Team captain
- (S) Suspended
- (I) Ineligible
- (W) Walk-on
- Injured
- Current redshirt

Roster

== Schedule ==
Date time, TV	Rank^{#}	Opponent^{#}	Result	Record	Site (attendance) city, state
Exhibition
11/05/2016*; 2:00 pm		Alaska Anchorange	W 88–46		Reed Gym; Pocatello, ID
Non-conference regular season
11/11/2016*; 2:00 pm		at Santa Clara	L 78–82	0–1	Leavey Center (250); Santa Clara, CA
11/14/2016*; 7:00 pm		at No. 24 Oregon State	L 38–61	0–2	Gill Coliseum (2,589); Corvallis, OR
11/19/2016*; 7:00 pm		UC Irvine	W 65–54	1–2	Reed Gym (763); Pocatello, ID
11/24/2016*; 4:30 pm		vs. James Madison; Cancún Challenge Riviera Division	L 53–83	1–3	Hard Rock Hotel Riviera Maya (1,610); Cancún, Mexico
11/25/2016*; 2:00 pm		vs. Davidson; Cancún Challenge Riviera Division	W 70–58	2–3	Hard Rock Hotel Riviera Maya (1,610); Cancún, Mexico
12/01/2016*; 7:00 pm		at Utah State	L 56–69	2–4	Smith Spectrum (665); Logan, UT
12/03/2016*; 6:00 pm		at No. 21 Colorado	L 56–85	2–5	Coors Events Center (1,602); Boulder, CO
12/06/2016*; 6:00 pm		at Wisconsin	W 42–35	3–5	Kohl Center (2,852); Madison, WI
12/11/2016*; 2:00 pm		Denver	W 65–64 ^{2OT}	4–5	Reed Gym (739); Pocatello, ID
12/16/2016*; 8:00 pm		Montana Tech	W 77–55	5–5	Reed Gym (709); Pocatello, ID
12/20/2016*; 7:00 pm		Utah Valley	W 61–56	6–5	Reed Gym (758); Pocatello, ID
Big Sky regular season
12/29/2016; 7:00 pm		Montana	W 61–43	7–5 (1–0)	Reed Gym (920); Pocatello, ID
12/31/2016; 2:00 pm		Montana State	W 67–59	8–5 (2–0)	Reed Gym (826); Pocatello, ID
01/07/2017; 2:00 pm		at Weber State	L 43–50	8–6 (2–1)	Dee Events Center (748); Ogden, UT
01/12/2017; 7:00 pm		at Eastern Washington	L 41–58	8–7 (2–2)	Reese Court (612); Cheney, WA
01/14/2017; 2:00 pm		at Idaho	W 67–60	9–7 (3–2)	Cowan Spectrum (415); Moscow, ID
01/19/2017; 7:00 pm		Northern Colorado	L 62–77	9–8 (3–3)	Reed Gym (942); Pocatello, ID
01/21/2017; 2:00 pm		North Dakota	L 70–75	9–9 (3–4)	Reed Gym (893); Pocatello, ID
01/28/2017; 2:00 pm		at Weber State	W 57–52	10–9 (4–4)	Reed Gym (1,031); Pocatello, ID
02/02/2017; 7:30 pm		at Northern Arizona	W 64–51	11–9 (5–4)	Walkup Skydome (389); Flagstaff, AZ
02/04/2017; 7:30 pm		at Southern Utah	W 71–68 ^{2OT}	12–9 (6–4)	Centrum Arena (894); Cedar City, UT
02/09/2017; 7:00 pm		Portland State	W 53–47	13–9 (7–4)	Reed Gym (1,022); Pocatello, ID
02/11/2017; 2:00 pm		Sacramento State	W 79–60	14–9 (8–4)	Reed Gym (1,016); Pocatello, ID
02/16/2017; 1:00 pm		at North Dakota	L 56–63	14–10 (8–5)	Betty Engelstad Sioux Center (1,710); Grand Forks, ND
02/18/2017; 2:00 pm		at Northern Colorado	W 68–58	15–10 (9–5)	Bank of Colorado Arena (1,884); Greeley, CO
02/23/2017; 7:00 pm		Idaho	W 80–69	16–10 (10–5)	Reed Gym (1,051); Pocatello, ID
02/25/2017; 2:00 pm		Eastern Washington	L 58–61	16–11 (10–6)	Reed Gym (1,035); Pocatello, ID
03/01/2017; 7:00 pm		at Montana State	L 67–73	16–12 (10–7)	Worthington Arena (1,601); Bozeman, MT
03/03/2017; 7:00 pm		at Montana	L 53–68	16–13 (10–8)	Dahlberg Arena (2,942); Missoula, MT
Big Sky Women's Tournament
03/06/2017; 9:05 pm	(6)	vs. (11) Montana; First Round	W 63–53	17–13	Reno Events Center (906); Reno, NV
03/08/2017; 9:05 pm	(6)	vs. (3) Montana; Quarterfinals	W 60–59	18–13	Reno Events Center (804); Reno, NV
03/10/2017; 3:35 pm	(6)	vs. (7) Portland State; Semifinals	W 54–50	19–13	Reno Events Center (1,202); Reno, NV
03/11/2017; 1:05 pm	(6)	vs. (1) Montana State; Championship Game	L 56–62	19–14	Reno Events Center (919); Reno, NV
*Non-conference game. ^{#}Rankings from AP Poll. (#) Tournament seedings in parentheses. All times are in Mountain Time.

== See also ==
- 2016–17 Idaho State Bengals men's basketball team
