= 2016–17 Eastern Washington Eagles women's basketball team =

Intercollegiate basketball season

2016–17 Eastern Washington Eagles women's basketball

WBI, Quarterfinals
- Conference: Big Sky Conference
- Record: 19–14 (12–6 Big Sky)
- Head coach: Wendy Schuller (16th season)
- Assistant coaches: Jerise Freeman; Bryce Currie; Jodi Page
- Home arena: Reese Court

2016–17 Big Sky women's basketball standings
| | Conf. | | | | Overall |
| Team | W | | L | PCT | W | | L | PCT |
|---|---|---|---|---|---|---|---|---|
| Montana State † | 15 | – | 3 | .833 | 25 | – | 7 | .781 |
| North Dakota | 15 | – | 3 | .833 | 20 | – | 11 | .645 |
| Northern Colorado | 14 | – | 4 | .778 | 22 | – | 8 | .733 |
| Eastern Washington | 12 | – | 6 | .667 | 19 | – | 14 | .576 |
| Idaho | 11 | – | 7 | .611 | 19 | – | 15 | .559 |
| Idaho State | 10 | – | 8 | .556 | 19 | – | 14 | .576 |
| Portland State | 8 | – | 10 | .444 | 16 | – | 17 | .485 |
| Weber State | 6 | – | 12 | .333 | 13 | – | 18 | .419 |
| Sacramento State | 6 | – | 12 | .333 | 10 | – | 20 | .333 |
| Northern Arizona | 5 | – | 13 | .278 | 9 | – | 21 | .300 |
| Montana | 4 | – | 14 | .222 | 7 | – | 23 | .233 |
| Southern Utah | 2 | – | 16 | .111 | 7 | – | 23 | .233 |
† 2017 Big Sky tournament winner As of March 23, 2017; Rankings from AP poll

The 2016–17 Eastern Washington Eagles Women's basketball team represented Eastern Washington University during the 2016–17 NCAA Division I women's basketball season. The Eagles, led by 16th year head coach Wendy Schuller, played their home games at Reese Court as members of the Big Sky Conference. They finished the season 19–14, 12–6 in Big Sky play to finish in fourth place. They advanced to the semifinals of the Big Sky women's tournament where they lost to Montana State. They were invited to the Women's Basketball Invitational where they defeated Texas State in the first round before losing in the quarterfinals to Big Sky member Idaho.

== Roster ==
2016–17 Eastern Washington Eagles women's basketball team
Players
Coaches

| Pos. | # | Name | Height | Year | Previous school | Hometown |
|---|---|---|---|---|---|---|
| G | 00 | Ashli Payne | 6 ft 0 in (1.83 m) | Sr | Olympic HS; Umpqua CC | Bremerton, WA |
| G | 1 | Aqeelah Williams | 5 ft 8 in (1.73 m) | So | Cleveland HS | Seattle, WA |
| F | 2 | Uriah Howard | 5 ft 11 in (1.8 m) | Fr | Miramonte HS | Oakland, CA |
| G | 3 | Symone Starks | 5 ft 6 in (1.68 m) | Fr | Highlands Ranch HS | Lone Tree, CO |
| G | 4 | Delaney Hodgins | 6 ft 0 in (1.83 m) | Jr | Chiawana HS | Pasco, WA |
| G | 5 | Baylee Rexing | 5 ft 3 in (1.6 m) | RS Fr | North Gwinnett HS | Suwanee, GA |
| C | 10 | Kianna Baker | 6 ft 3 in (1.91 m) | Fr | Tulare Union HS | Tulare, CA |
| F | 11 | Amy Hartheroad | 6 ft 0 in (1.83 m) | Fr | Plano West HS | Dallas, TX |
| G | 12 | Violet Kapri Morrow | 5 ft 8 in (1.73 m) | So | Wilson HS | Tacoma, WA |
| G | 13 | Desiree Harding | 5 ft 7 in (1.7 m) | So | Fresno HS | Fresno, CA |
| G | 20 | Tisha Phillips | 5 ft 9 in (1.75 m) | RS Sr | Lewiston HS | Lapwai, ID |
| F | 23 | Mariah Cunningham | 6 ft 0 in (1.83 m) | Jr | Central Valley HS | Spokane, WA |
| G | 24 | Amira Chandler | 6 ft 2 in (1.88 m) | So | Wenatchee HS | Wenatchee, WA |
| F | 30 | Alissa Sealby | 6 ft 0 in (1.83 m) | So | Wenatchee HS | Wenatchee, WA |
| G | 54 | Andie Easley (I) (redshirt) | 5 ft 10 in (1.78 m) | So | Horizon HS; Hawai'i | Phoenix, AZ |

Head coach

- Wendy Schuller (Fresno Pacific)

Assistant coach(es)

- Jerise Freeman (Pacific)
- Bryce Currie (Washington)
- Jodi Page (San José State)

Legend

- (C) Team captain
- (S) Suspended
- (I) Ineligible
- (W) Walk-on
- Injured
- Current redshirt

Roster

== Schedule ==
| Date time, TV | Rank^{#} | Opponent^{#} | Result | Record | Site (attendance) city, state |
Exhibition
| 11/06/2016*; 4:00 pm | | Eastern Oregon | W 67–60 | | Reese Court (330); Cheney, WA |
Non-conference regular season
| 11/11/2016*; 7:00 pm | | at No. 17 Washington; Preseason WNIT First Round | L 52–100 | 0–1 | Alaska Airlines Arena (2,263); Seattle, WA |
| 11/18/2016*; 1:30 pm | | vs. Elon; Preseason WNIT consolation round | L 55–76 | 0–2 | McGuirk Arena (100); Mount Pleasant, MI |
| 11/19/2016*; 1:30 pm | | vs. Furman; Preseason WNIT consolation round | W 68–56 | 1–2 | McGuirk Arena; Mount Pleasant, MI |
| 11/22/2016*; 6:00 pm | | at Utah Valley | W 83–50 | 2–2 | UCCU Center (203); Orem, UT |
| 11/27/2016*; 3:00 pm | | Multnomah | W 88–30 | 3–2 | Reese Court (227); Cheney, WA |
| 12/01/2016*; 6:00 pm | | at Boise State | L 64–67 | 3–3 | Taco Bell Arena (613); Boise, ID |
| 12/03/2016*; 6:30 pm | | at Cal State Northridge | W 71–57 | 4–3 | Matadome (316); Northridge, CA |
| 12/08/2016*; 11:00 am | | Cal State Fullerton | W 84–67 | 5–3 | Reese Court (2,730); Cheney, WA |
| 12/11/2016*; 2:00 pm | | Gonzaga | L 54–73 | 5–4 | Reese Court (1,438); Cheney, WA |
| 12/18/2016*; 1:00 pm | | at Air Force | Cancelled | | Clune Arena; Colorado Springs, CO |
| 12/21/2016*; 3:00 pm | | at Tulane; Tulane Classic semifinals | L 51–63 | 5–5 | Devlin Fieldhouse (820); New Orleans, LA |
| 12/21/2016*; 1:00 pm | | vs. Drake; Tulane Classic 3rd place game | L 78–93 | 5–6 | Devlin Fieldhouse (529); New Orleans, LA |
Big Sky regular season
| 12/31/2016; 2:00 pm | | Idaho | W 67–57 | 6–6 (1–0) | Reese Court (680); Cheney, WA |
| 01/05/2017; 6:00 pm | | at Montana State | L 83–88 | 6–7 (1–1) | Worthington Arena (1,266); Bozeman, MT |
| 01/07/2017; 1:00 pm | | at Montana | W 60–46 | 7–7 (2–1) | Dahlberg Arena (2,648); Missoula, MT |
| 01/12/2017; 6:00 pm | | Idaho State | W 58–41 | 8–7 (3–1) | Reese Court (612); Cheney, WA |
| 01/14/2017; 2:00 pm | | Weber State | W 99–85 | 9–7 (4–1) | Reese Court (580); Cheney, WA |
| 01/19/2017; 6:30 pm | | at Northern Arizona | L 47–56 | 9–8 (4–2) | Walkup Skydome (249); Flagstaff, AZ |
| 01/21/2017; 3:00 pm | | at Southern Utah | W 67–66 | 10–8 (5–2) | Centrum Arena (726); Cedar City, UT |
| 01/26/2017; 6:00 pm | | Montana | W 64–57 | 11–8 (6–2) | Reese Court (1,026); Cheney, WA |
| 01/28/2017; 2:00 pm | | Montana State | L 61–72 | 11–9 (6–3) | Reese Court (1,008); Cheney, WA |
| 02/02/2017; 7:05 pm | | at Sacramento State | W 72–65 | 12–9 (7–3) | Hornets Nest (448); Sacramento, CA |
| 02/04/2017; 2:00 pm | | at Portland State | W 68–62 | 13–9 (8–3) | Peter Stott Center (250); Portland, OR |
| 02/09/2017; 6:00 pm | | North Dakota | L 71–75 | 13–10 (8–4) | Reese Court (795); Cheney, WA |
| 02/11/2017; 2:00 pm | | Northern Colorado | W 67–61 | 14–10 (9–4) | Reese Court (1,010); Cheney, WA |
| 02/18/2017; 2:00 pm | | at Idaho | L 51–78 | 14–11 (9–5) | Cowan Spectrum (574); Moscow, ID |
| 02/23/2017; 6:00 pm | | at Weber State | W 70–42 | 15–11 (10–5) | Dee Events Center (637); Ogden, UT |
| 02/25/2017; 1:00 pm | | at Idaho State | W 61–58 | 16–11 (11–5) | Reed Gym (1,035); Pocatello, ID |
| 03/01/2017; 6:00 pm | | Southern Utah | L 63–64 | 16–12 (11–6) | Reese Court (801); Cheney, WA |
| 03/03/2017; 6:00 pm | | Northern Arizona | W 79–64 | 17–12 (12–6) | Reese Court (1,003); Cheney, WA |
Big Sky Women's Tournament
| 03/08/2017; 2:35 pm | (4) | vs. (5) Idaho; Quarterfinals | W 73–64 | 18–12 | Reno Events Center (787); Reno, NV |
| 03/10/2017; 12:05 pm | (4) | vs. (1) Montana State; Semifinals | L 59–61 | 18–13 | Reno Events Center (1,202); Reno, NV |
WBI
| 03/16/2017*; 5:00 pm | | at Texas State; First Round | W 66–62 ^{OT} | 19–13 | Strahan Coliseum (1,255); San Marcos, TX |
| 03/20/2017*; 6:05 pm | | Idaho; Quarterfinals | L 67–74 | 19–14 | Reese Court; Cheney, WA |
*Non-conference game. ^{#}Rankings from AP Poll. (#) Tournament seedings in parentheses. All times are in Pacific Time.

== See also ==
2016–17 Eastern Washington Eagles men's basketball team
