= 2016–17 Montana Lady Griz basketball team =

Intercollegiate basketball season

2016–17 Montana Lady Griz basketball
- Conference: Big Sky Conference
- Record: 7–23 (4–14 Big Sky)
- Head coach: Shannon Schweyen (1st season)
- Assistant coaches: Sonya Rogers; Mike Petrino; Eric Hays
- Home arena: Dahlberg Arena

2016–17 Big Sky women's basketball standings
	Conf.				Overall
Team	W		L	PCT	W		L	PCT
Montana State †	15	–	3	.833	25	–	7	.781
North Dakota	15	–	3	.833	20	–	11	.645
Northern Colorado	14	–	4	.778	22	–	8	.733
Eastern Washington	12	–	6	.667	19	–	14	.576
Idaho	11	–	7	.611	19	–	15	.559
Idaho State	10	–	8	.556	19	–	14	.576
Portland State	8	–	10	.444	16	–	17	.485
Weber State	6	–	12	.333	13	–	18	.419
Sacramento State	6	–	12	.333	10	–	20	.333
Northern Arizona	5	–	13	.278	9	–	21	.300
Montana	4	–	14	.222	7	–	23	.233
Southern Utah	2	–	16	.111	7	–	23	.233
† 2017 Big Sky tournament winner As of March 23, 2017; Rankings from AP poll

The 2016–17 Montana Lady Griz basketball team represented the University of Montana during the 2016–17 NCAA Division I women's basketball season. The Lady Griz played their home games at Dahlberg Arena and were members of the Big Sky Conference. They finished the season 7–23, 4–14 in Big Sky play to finish in eleventh place. They lost in the first round of the Big Sky women's tournament to Idaho State.

On July 27, 2016, longtime head coach Robin Selvig announced his retirement effective August 31. Assistant coach Shannon Schweyen assumed head coaching duties.

== Roster ==
2016–17 Montana Lady Griz women's basketball team
Players
Coaches

Pos.	#	Name	Height	Year	Previous school	Hometown
G	00	Maddie Keast	5 ft 9 in (1.75 m)	RS So	Sentinel HS	Missoula, MT
G	3	Gabi Harrington	5 ft 9 in (1.75 m)	Fr	Bishop Kelly HS	Boise, ID
G	4	Sierra Anderson	5 ft 6 in (1.68 m)	RS So	Henry M. Jackson HS	Mill Creek, WA
F	10	Kayleigh Valley	5 ft 11 in (1.8 m)	Sr	University HS	Spokane, WA
F	11	Rachel Staudacher	6 ft 1 in (1.85 m)	RS Sr	Cedar Park Christian	Bothell, WA
F	12	Nora Klick	6 ft 0 in (1.83 m)	Fr	Great Falls HS	Simms, MT
F	13	Alycia Sims	6 ft 3 in (1.91 m)	Sr	Stevensville HS	Stevensville, MT
F	14	Hailey Nicholson	6 ft 0 in (1.83 m)	Fr	Malta HS	Malta, MT
F	22	Mekayla Isaak	6 ft 1 in (1.85 m)	RS Jr	Bend HS	Bend, OR
G	23	Taylor Goligoski	5 ft 8 in (1.73 m)	RS Fr	Hamilton HS	Hamilton, MT
F	24	Jace Henderson	6 ft 0 in (1.83 m)	RS So	Billings Senior HS	Billings, MT
C	31	Henny Hearn	6 ft 2 in (1.88 m)	RS Fr	Century HS	Pocatello, ID
G	32	McKenzie Johnston	5 ft 7 in (1.7 m)	RS Fr	Capital HS	Helena, MT
G	34	Madi Schoening	5 ft 9 in (1.75 m)	Fr	Sandpoint HS	Sandpoint, ID
F	44	Emma Stockholm	6 ft 2 in (1.88 m)	Fr	Chelan HS	Chelan, WA

Head coach

- Shannon Schweyen (Montana)

Assistant coach(es)

- Mike Petrino (Montana State Billings)
- Sonya Rogers (Montana)
- Eric Hays (Washington State)

Legend

- (C) Team captain
- (S) Suspended
- (I) Ineligible
- (W) Walk-on
- Injured
- Current redshirt

Roster

== Schedule ==
Date time, TV	Rank^{#}	Opponent^{#}	Result	Record	Site (attendance) city, state
Exhibition
11/01/2016*; 7:00 pm		Montana State–Northern	W 64–56		Dahlberg Arena (2,226); Missoula, MT
11/07/2016*; 7:00 pm		Carroll (Montana)	W 61–39		Dahlberg Arena (903); Missoula, MT
Non-conference regular season
11/15/2015*; 7:00 pm		Great Falls	W 66–55	1–0	Dahlberg Arena (2,338); Missoula, MT
11/19/2016*; 11:30 am		vs. South Dakota State; Hawkeye Classic semifinals	L 43–84	1–1	Carver–Hawkeye Arena (200); Iowa City, IA
11/20/2016*; 10:30 am		vs. Massachusetts; Hawkeye Classic 3rd place game	L 58–59	1–2	Carver–Hawkeye Arena (107); Iowa City, IA
11/23/2016*; 7:00 pm		Incarnate Word; 36th Lady Griz Classic	W 61–56	2–2	Dahlberg Arena (2,338); Missoula, MT
11/27/2016*; 2:00 pm		Utah State; 36th Lady Griz Classic	L 46–65	2–3	Dahlberg Arena (2,506); Missoula, MT
11/30/2016*; 6:00 pm		at Cal State Fullerton	L 56–72	2–4	Titan Gym (274); Fullerton, CA
12/02/2016*; 8:00 pm		at Seattle	L 44–60	2–5	Connolly Center (236); Seattle, WA
12/10/2016*; 4:00 pm		at Stephen F. Austin	L 46–54	2–6	William R. Johnson Coliseum (444); Nacogdoches, TX
12/12/2016*; 7:00 pm		Rocky Mountain (Montana)	W 64–56	3–6	Dahlberg Arena (2,411); Missoula, MT
12/18/2016*; 2:00 pm		Wyoming	L 42–67	3–7	Dahlberg Arena (2,569); Missoula, MT
12/21/2016*; 7:00 pm		Colorado State	L 49–63	3–8	Dahlberg Arena (2,442); Missoula, MT
Big Sky regular season
12/29/2016; 7:00 pm		at Idaho State	L 43–61	3–9 (0–1)	Reed Gym (920); Pocatello, ID
12/31/2016; 2:00 pm		at Weber State	L 58–74	3–10 (0–2)	Dee Events Center (758); Ogden, UT
01/05/2017; 7:00 pm		Idaho	L 59–86	3–11 (0–3)	Dahlberg Arena (2,486); Missoula, MT
01/07/2017; 2:00 pm		Eastern Washington	L 46–60	3–12 (0–4)	Dahlberg Arena (2,648); Missoula, MT
01/12/2017; 7:00 pm		at Northern Colorado	L 46–65	3–13 (0–5)	Bank of Colorado Arena (820); Greeley, CO
01/14/2017; 1:00 pm		at North Dakota	L 63–73	3–14 (0–6)	Betty Engelstad Sioux Center (1,893); Grand Forks, ND
01/19/2017; 7:00 pm		Portland State	L 44–64	3–15 (0–7)	Dahlberg Arena (2,579); Missoula, MT
01/21/2017; 2:00 pm		Sacramento State	L 60–73	3–16 (0–8)	Dahlberg Arena (2,966); Missoula, MT
01/26/2017; 7:00 pm		at Eastern Washington	L 57–64	3–17 (0–9)	Reese Court (1,026); Cheney, WA
01/28/2017; 3:00 pm		at Idaho	L 50–75	3–18 (0–10)	Cowan Spectrum (738); Moscow, ID
02/04/2017; 2:00 pm, SWX Montana		Montana State	L 69–75	3–19 (0–11)	Dahlberg Arena (3,223); Missoula, MT
02/09/2017; 7:00 pm		Southern Utah	W 64–55	4–19 (1–11)	Dahlberg Arena (2,843); Missoula, MT
02/11/2017; 2:00 pm		Northern Arizona	W 60–59	5–19 (2–11)	Dahlberg Arena (2,722); Missoula, MT
02/16/2017; 8:00 pm		at Sacramento State	L 69–99	5–20 (2–12)	Hornets Nest (358); Sacramento, CA
02/18/2017; 3:00 pm		at Portland State	L 45–68	5–21 (2–13)	Peter Stott Center (323); Portland, OR
02/25/2017; 2:00 pm, SWX Montana		at Montana State	L 54–71	5–22 (2–14)	Worthington Arena (3,273); Bozeman, MT
03/01/2017; 7:00 pm		Weber State	W 71–46	6–22 (3–14)	Dahlberg Arena (3,296); Missoula, MT
03/03/2017; 7:00 pm		Idaho State	W 68–53	7–22 (4–14)	Dahlberg Arena (2,942); Missoula, MT
Big Sky Women's Tournament
03/06/2017; 9:05 pm	(11)	vs. (6) Idaho State; First Round	L 53–63	7–23	Reno Events Center (906); Reno, NV
*Non-conference game. ^{#}Rankings from AP Poll. (#) Tournament seedings in parentheses. All times are in Mountain Time.

== See also ==
- 2016–17 Montana Grizzlies basketball team
