= 2016–17 Sacramento State Hornets women's basketball team =

Intercollegiate basketball season

2016–17 Sacramento State Hornets women's basketball
- Conference: Big Sky Conference
- Record: 10–20 (6–12 Big Sky)
- Head coach: Bunky Harkleroad (4th season)
- Assistant coaches: Derrick Florence; Bill Baxter; Jessica Kunisaki
- Home arena: Hornets Nest

2016–17 Big Sky women's basketball standings
	Conf.				Overall
Team	W		L	PCT	W		L	PCT
Montana State †	15	–	3	.833	25	–	7	.781
North Dakota	15	–	3	.833	20	–	11	.645
Northern Colorado	14	–	4	.778	22	–	8	.733
Eastern Washington	12	–	6	.667	19	–	14	.576
Idaho	11	–	7	.611	19	–	15	.559
Idaho State	10	–	8	.556	19	–	14	.576
Portland State	8	–	10	.444	16	–	17	.485
Weber State	6	–	12	.333	13	–	18	.419
Sacramento State	6	–	12	.333	10	–	20	.333
Northern Arizona	5	–	13	.278	9	–	21	.300
Montana	4	–	14	.222	7	–	23	.233
Southern Utah	2	–	16	.111	7	–	23	.233
† 2017 Big Sky tournament winner As of March 23, 2017; Rankings from AP poll

The 2016–17 Sacramento State Hornets women's basketball team represented California State University, Sacramento during the 2016–17 NCAA Division I women's basketball season. The Hornets, led by fourth year head coach Bunky Harkleroad and played their home games at Hornets Nest. They were members of the Big Sky Conference. They finished the season 10–20, 6–12 in Big Sky play to finish in a tie for eighth place. They lost in the first round of the Big Sky women's tournament where they lost to Weber State.

== Roster ==
2016–17 Sacramento State Hornets women's basketball team
Players
Coaches

Pos.	#	Name	Height	Year	Previous school	Hometown
G	1	Raegen Rohn	5 ft 6 in (1.68 m)	So	Monarch HS	Erie, CO
G	2	Taylor Brown	5 ft 7 in (1.7 m)	Jr	Chino HS	Chino, CA
G	3	Brianna Burgos	5 ft 6 in (1.68 m)	RS Sr	Sheldon HS; Sonoma State	Sacramento, CA
G	4	Justyce Dawson	5 ft 4 in (1.63 m)	Jr	Long Beach Poly HS	Carson, CA
G	5	Kelli Robinson	5 ft 6 in (1.68 m)	RS So	Woodbridge HS	Irvine, CA
F	10	Margaret Huntington	6 ft 0 in (1.83 m)	Sr	Bishop O'Dowd HS	Oakland, CA
G	11	Emily Easom	5 ft 10 in (1.78 m)	RS Sr	Marin Catholic HS; Portland State	San Rafael, CA
G	12	Ashlyn Crenshaw	5 ft 8 in (1.73 m)	Sr	Lincoln HS	Stockton, CA
F	15	Sydonia Daniels	6 ft 1 in (1.85 m)	Sr	Arts HS; State Fair CC	Irvington, NJ
G	20	Tiara Scott	5 ft 4 in (1.63 m)	Fr	St. Anthony HS	Torrance, CA
G	22	Maranne Johnson	5 ft 7 in (1.7 m)	Jr	Deer Valley HS	Antioch, CA
G/F	23	Dajhae Mullins	5 ft 10 in (1.78 m)	Jr	Marian Catholic HS; Trinity Valley CC	Chicago, IL
F	24	Gretchen Harringan	5 ft 8 in (1.73 m)	Sr	Casa Grande HS; Santa Rosa JC	Petaluma, CA
F	30	Kyhonta Doughty	6 ft 1 in (1.85 m)	Sr	Warren Easton HS; Trinity Valley CC	New Orleans, LA
G	32	Hannah Friend (I) (redshirt)	6 ft 0 in (1.83 m)	So	Farmington HS; Delaware	Troy, NY
F	33	Kennedy Nicholas	6 ft 3 in (1.91 m)	Fr	Inglemoor HS	Kirkland, WA
F	34	Alexia Mefi	5 ft 8 in (1.73 m)	Jr	Cleveland HS; College of Southern Idaho	Seattle, WA

Head coach

- Bunky Harkleroad (Berea)

Assistant coach(es)

- Kim Stephens (Glenville State)
- Bill Baxter (UC Davis)
- Jessica Kunisaki (Chapman)

Legend

- (C) Team captain
- (S) Suspended
- (I) Ineligible
- (W) Walk-on
- Injured
- Current redshirt

Roster

== Schedule ==
Date time, TV	Rank^{#}	Opponent^{#}	Result	Record	Site (attendance) city, state
Exhibition
10/30/2016*; 2:05 pm		Holy Names	W 92–55		Hornets Nest (268); Sacramento, CA
11/06/2016*; 2:05 pm		San Francisco State	W 81–46		Hornets Nest (207); Sacramento, CA
Non-conference regular season
11/11/2016*; 6:00 pm		at San Francisco	L 80–91	0–1	War Memorial Gymnasium (612); San Francisco, CA
11/13/2016*; 2:00 pm		Cal Poly	W 97–96	1–1	Hornets Nest (381); Sacramento, CA
11/16/2016*; 7:05 pm		Nevada	L 95–99	1–2	Hornets Nest (332); Sacramento, CA
11/18/2016*; 6:00 pm		vs. New Mexico State; Bank of Hawaii Classic	L 73–99	1–3	Stan Sheriff Center; Honolulu, HI
11/20/2016*; 5:00 pm		vs. Youngstown State; Bank of Hawaii Classic	L 94–102	1–4	Stan Sheriff Center; Honolulu, HI
11/25/2016*; 2:05 pm		Hofstra	W 97–85	2–4	Hornets Nest (305); Sacramento, CA
11/29/2016*; 7:05 pm		Cal State Stanislaus	W 102–72	3–4	Hornets Nest (339); Sacramento, CA
12/03/2016*; 7:35 pm		USC	L 95–111	3–5	Hornets Nest (954); Sacramento, CA
12/08/2016*; 7:00 pm		at California	L 73–97	3–6	Haas Pavilion (1,484); Berkeley, CA
12/10/2016*; 2:05 pm		at UC Irvine	W 78–70	4–6	Bren Events Center (159); Irvine, CA
12/18/2016*; 2:05 pm		UC Davis	L 78–110	4–7	Hornets Nest (613); Sacramento, CA
Big Sky regular season
12/29/2016; 6:00 pm		at Northern Colorado	L 88–95	4–8 (0–1)	Bank of Colorado Arena (592); Greeley, CO
12/31/2016; 12:00 pm		at North Dakota	L 71–94	4–9 (0–2)	Betty Engelstad Sioux Center (1,405); Grand Forks, ND
01/07/2017; 12:05 pm		Portland State	L 86–88	4–10 (0–3)	Hornets Nest (334); Sacramento, CA
01/12/2017; 7:05 pm		Southern Utah	W 81–69	5–10 (1–3)	Hornets Nest (275); Sacramento, CA
01/14/2017; 2:05 pm		Northern Arizona	W 82–76	6–10 (2–3)	Hornets Nest (416); Sacramento, CA
01/19/2017; 6:00 pm		at Montana State	L 80–84	6–11 (2–4)	Worthington Arena (1,316); Bozeman, MT
01/21/2017; 1:00 pm		at Montana	W 73–60	7–11 (3–4)	Dahlberg Arena (2,966); Missoula, MT
01/28/2017; 12:00 pm		at Portland State	W 77–68	8–11 (4–4)	Peter Stott Center (283); Portland, OR
02/02/2017; 7:05 pm		Eastern Washington	L 65–72	8–12 (4–5)	Hornets Nest (448); Sacramento, CA
02/04/2017; 2:05 pm		Idaho	L 58–72	8–13 (4–6)	Hornets Nest (302); Sacramento, CA
02/09/2017; 11:00 am		at Weber State	L 60–66	8–14 (4–7)	Dee Events Center (1,046); Ogden, UT
02/11/2017; 1:00 pm		at Idaho State	L 60–79	8–15 (4–8)	Reed Gym (1,016); Pocatello, ID
02/16/2017; 7:05 pm		Montana	W 99–69	9–15 (5–8)	Hornets Nest (358); Sacramento, CA
02/18/2017; 2:05 pm		Montana State	L 82–104	9–16 (5–9)	Hornets Nest (370); Sacramento, CA
02/23/2017; 5:30 pm		at Northern Arizona	L 88–91	9–17 (5–10)	Walkup Skydome (513); Flagstaff, AZ
02/25/2017; 1:00 pm		at Southern Utah	W 110–104	10–17 (6–10)	Centrum Arena (1,012); Cedar City, UT
03/01/2017; 7:05 pm		North Dakota	L 78–92	10–18 (6–11)	Hornets Nest (314); Sacramento, CA
03/03/2017; 7:05 pm		Northern Colorado	L 74–102	10–19 (6–12)	Hornets Nest (607); Sacramento, CA
Big Sky Women's Tournament
03/06/2017; 12:05 pm	(9)	vs. (8) Weber State; First Round	L 97–98 ^{OT}	10–20	Reno Events Center (672); Reno, NV
*Non-conference game. ^{#}Rankings from AP Poll. (#) Tournament seedings in parentheses. All times are in Pacific Time.

== See also ==
2016–17 Sacramento State Hornets men's basketball team
