= Jon Newlee =

American basketball coach

Current position
- Title: Head coach
- Record: 213–171 (.555)

Biographical details
- Born: February 26, 1959 (age 67); Rialto, California, U.S.
- Education: San Diego State University

Playing career
- 1977–1979: Chaffey CC
- Position: Point guard

Coaching career (HC unless noted)
- 1983–1986: Saint Mary's (asst.)
- 1986–1989: Southwestern CC
- 1989–1991: UTSA (asst.)
- 1991–1999: SMU (asst.)
- 1999–2002: Hawaii (asst.)
- 2002–2008: Idaho State
- 2008–2023: Idaho
- 2024–present: South West Metro Pirates

Head coaching record
- Overall: 306–253 (.547)
- Tournaments: 0–4 (NCAA); 2–5 (WNIT); 2–2 (WBI)

Accomplishments and honors

Championships
- Big Sky tournament (2007); 2× WAC tournament (2013, 2014)

Awards
- PCC Coach of the Year (1989); 3× Big Sky Coach of the Year (2004, 2006, 2019); WAC Coach of the Year (2009)

Jon Patrick Newlee (born February 26, 1959) is the head women's basketball coach for the South West Metro Pirates, in the NBL1 North in Australia. He previously served for 15 years as the head women's coach at University of Idaho and prior to that served for six years as the head women's basketball coach at Idaho State University.

== Early life ==
Son of Chaffey Community College basketball coach Barney Newlee, Jon Newlee was born and raised in Rialto, California. At Eisenhower High School in Rialto, Newlee played basketball and tennis; among his basketball teammates was future NFL Hall of Famer Ronnie Lott. Newlee then attended Chaffey Community College and played two years of basketball before transferring to San Diego State University in 1979. Newlee graduated from San Diego State in 1982 with a bachelor's degree in physical education.

== Coaching career ==
From 1983 to 1986, Newlee was an assistant coach at Saint Mary's.

Newlee got his first head coaching position in 1986 at Southwestern College, a junior college in Chula Vista, California. In three seasons, he turned around its women's basketball program from two wins in his first season to a 22–6 record in the 1988–89 season. Newlee earned Pacific Coast Athletic Conference Coach of the Year honors as a result.

After Southwestern, Newlee returned to the major college ranks as an assistant with UTSA from 1989 to 1991, SMU from 1991 to 1999 under Rhonda Rompola, and Hawaii from 1999 to 2002 under Vince Goo.

After six seasons as head coach at Idaho State, Newlee became the ninth head coach in University of Idaho women's basketball history on April 15, 2008.

== Head coaching record ==
Source for Idaho State:

Sources for Idaho:

Record table
Season	Team	Overall	Conference	Standing	Postseason
Idaho State Bengals (Big Sky Conference) (2002–2008)
2002–03	Idaho State	6–20	2–12	7th	
2003–04	Idaho State	20–9	11–3	T–2nd	WNIT First Round
2004–05	Idaho State	13–16	7–7	5th	
2005–06	Idaho State	17–12	11–3	1st	WNIT First Round
2006–07	Idaho State	17–13	11–5	T–2nd	NCAA First Round
2007–08	Idaho State	20–9	12–4	2nd	WNIT First Round
Idaho State:		93–82 (.531)	54–34 (.614)		
Idaho Vandals (Western Athletic Conference) (2008–2014)
2008–09	Idaho	13–15	10–6	T–3rd	
2009–10	Idaho	11–20	8–8	T–4th	
2010–11	Idaho	15–16	7–9	T–5th	WBI First Round
2011–12	Idaho	12–20	6–8	T–4th	
2012–13	Idaho	17–16	11–7	3rd	NCAA First Round
2013–14	Idaho	25–9	15–1	1st	NCAA First Round
Idaho (WAC):		93–96 (.492)	57–39 (.594)		
Idaho Vandals (Big Sky Conference) (2014–2023)
2014–15	Idaho	14–15	8–10	T–8th	
2015–16	Idaho	24–10	13–5	T–2nd	NCAA First Round
2016–17	Idaho	19–15	11–7	5th	WBI Semifinals
2017–18	Idaho	19–14	13–5	2nd	WNIT First Round
2018–19	Idaho	19–10	16–4	1st	WNIT Third Round
2019–20	Idaho	22–9	15–5	2nd	Canceled due to the COVID-19 pandemic.
2020–21	Idaho	17–7	14–3	2nd	
2021–22	Idaho	14–18	11–9	6th	
2022–23	Idaho	13–17	9–9	7th	
Idaho (Big Sky):		161–115 (.583)	110–57 (.659)		
Idaho (total):		257–171 (.600)	167–96 (.635)		
Total:		350–295 (.543)			
National champion Postseason invitational champion Conference regular season champion Conference regular season and conference tournament champion Division regular season champion Division regular season and conference tournament champion Conference tournament champion
