= 2016–17 Portland State Vikings women's basketball team =

Intercollegiate basketball season

2016–17 Portland State Vikings women's basketball
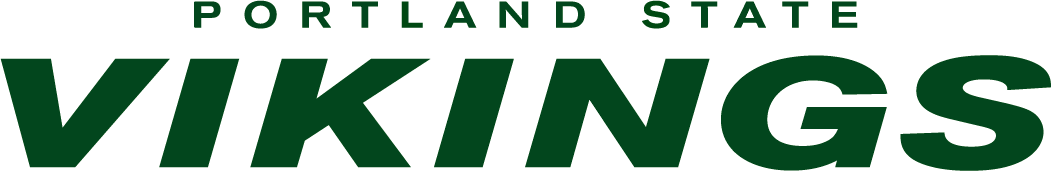
- Conference: Big Sky Conference
- Record: 16–17 (8–10 Big Sky)
- Head coach: Lynn Kennedy (2nd season)
- Assistant coaches: Alison Hewa; Chelsey Zimmerman; Amy Denson
- Home arena: Peter Stott Center

2016–17 Big Sky women's basketball standings
| | Conf. | | | | Overall |
| Team | W | | L | PCT | W | | L | PCT |
|---|---|---|---|---|---|---|---|---|
| Montana State † | 15 | – | 3 | .833 | 25 | – | 7 | .781 |
| North Dakota | 15 | – | 3 | .833 | 20 | – | 11 | .645 |
| Northern Colorado | 14 | – | 4 | .778 | 22 | – | 8 | .733 |
| Eastern Washington | 12 | – | 6 | .667 | 19 | – | 14 | .576 |
| Idaho | 11 | – | 7 | .611 | 19 | – | 15 | .559 |
| Idaho State | 10 | – | 8 | .556 | 19 | – | 14 | .576 |
| Portland State | 8 | – | 10 | .444 | 16 | – | 17 | .485 |
| Weber State | 6 | – | 12 | .333 | 13 | – | 18 | .419 |
| Sacramento State | 6 | – | 12 | .333 | 10 | – | 20 | .333 |
| Northern Arizona | 5 | – | 13 | .278 | 9 | – | 21 | .300 |
| Montana | 4 | – | 14 | .222 | 7 | – | 23 | .233 |
| Southern Utah | 2 | – | 16 | .111 | 7 | – | 23 | .233 |
† 2017 Big Sky tournament winner As of March 23, 2017; Rankings from AP poll

The 2016–17 Portland State Vikings women's basketball team represented Portland State University during the 2016–17 NCAA Division I women's basketball season. The Vikings, led by second-year head coach Lynn Kennedy, played their home games at the Peter Stott Center and were members of the Big Sky Conference. They finished the season 16–17, 8–10 in Big Sky play to finish in seventh place. They advanced to the semifinals of the Big Sky women's tournament to Idaho State.

== Roster ==
2016–17 Portland State Vikings women's basketball team
Players
Coaches

| Pos. | # | Name | Height | Year | Previous school | Hometown |
|---|---|---|---|---|---|---|
| G | 0 | Ashley Bolston | 6 ft 2 in (1.88 m) | RS So | South Medford HS; Washington State | Medford, OR |
| F | 1 | Caroline Wich | 6 ft 2 in (1.88 m) | Fr | Aarhus Academy | Aarhus, Denmark |
| G | 2 | Sidney Rielly | 6 ft 0 in (1.83 m) | RS So | Everett HS; Santa Clara | Everett, WA |
| G | 3 | Kiana Brown | 5 ft 8 in (1.73 m) | Jr | Triangle Lake HS; Washington State/Humboldt State | Cottage Grove, OR |
| F | 4 | Pia Jurhar | 6 ft 3 in (1.91 m) | So | BRG XIX Krottenbachstraße | Vienna, Austria |
| G | 5 | Kian McNair | 5 ft 6 in (1.68 m) | So | Salesian HS | Vallejo, CA |
| F | 10 | Courtney West | 6 ft 4 in (1.93 m) | RS So | Port Hacking HS; Southern Oregon | Sydney, Australia |
| F | 11 | Cici West | 5 ft 10 in (1.78 m) | Jr | Holy Names Academy | Seattle, WA |
| F | 12 | Tatiana Streun | 6 ft 0 in (1.83 m) | Fr | Bellevue HS | Bellevue, WA |
| G | 15 | Corey James | 5 ft 10 in (1.78 m) | So | West Albany HS | Albany, CA |
| G | 20 | Ashley Torres Negron | 5 ft 8 in (1.73 m) | Sr | Highland CC | Morovis, PR |
| G | 22 | Elizajane Loader | 5 ft 8 in (1.73 m) | Fr | Barker College | Central Coast, Australia |
| G | 23 | Yaremi Mejia | 5 ft 7 in (1.7 m) | RS Jr | South Medford HS | Auckland, New Zealand |
| F | 25 | Elle Pace | 6 ft 5 in (1.96 m) | Fr | Montrose | Montrose, CO |
| F | 32 | Jasmin Falls | 6 ft 0 in (1.83 m) | Fr | South Medford HS | Medford, OR |
| G | 45 | Michaela Kay | 5 ft 7 in (1.7 m) | So | Lewis & Clark HS | Spokane, WA |

Head coach

- Lynn Kennedy (Northwest University)

Assistant coach(es)

- Alison Hewa (Eastern Washington)
- Chelsey Zimmerman (Southern Oregon)
- Amy Denson (Arizona State)

Legend

- (C) Team captain
- (S) Suspended
- (I) Ineligible
- (W) Walk-on
- Injured
- Current redshirt

Roster

== Schedule ==
| Date time, TV | Rank^{#} | Opponent^{#} | Result | Record | Site (attendance) city, state |
Exhibition
| 11/04/2016*; 5:00 pm | | Western Oregon | W 100–96 | | Peter Stott Center; Portland, OR |
| 11/06/2016*; 2:00 pm | | Lewis & Clark College | W 96–69 | | Peter Stott Center; Portland, OR |
Non-conference regular season
| 11/11/2016*; 4:00 pm | | at Cal State Northridge | L 72–99 | 0–1 | Matadome (403); Northridge, CA |
| 11/16/2016*; 4:30 pm | | at Boise State | L 76–94 | 0–2 | Taco Bell Arena (638); Boise, ID |
| 11/20/2016*; 2:00 pm | | Pacific Union (CA) | W 94–61 | 1–2 | Peter Stott Center (152); Portland, OR |
| 11/23/2016*; 7:00 pm | | at Seattle | W 79–71 | 2–2 | Connolly Center (184); Seattle, WA |
| 11/30/2016*; 7:00 pm | | at Portland | L 68–79 | 2–3 | Chiles Center (209); Portland, OR |
| 12/03/2016*; 2:00 pm | | UC Irvine | W 79–73 | 3–3 | Peter Stott Center (228); Portland, OR |
| 12/10/2016*; 2:00 pm | | Cal State Fullerton | W 81–73 | 4–3 | Peter Stott Center (205); Portland, OR |
| 12/17/2016*; 5:00 pm | | vs. No. 25 Oregon; Portland Showcase | L 46–90 | 4–4 | Moda Center; Portland, OR |
| 12/19/2016*; 6:45 pm | | vs. Northern Kentucky; Puerto Rico Classic | W 77–54 | 5–4 | South Point Arena; Enterprise, NV |
| 12/20/2016*; 4:30 pm | | vs. Kennesaw State; Puerto Rico Classic | W 71–61 | 6–4 | South Point Arena (71); Enterprise, NV |
| 12/21/2016*; 7:00 pm | | vs. No. 20 Oklahoma; Puerto Rico Classic | L 60–74 | 6–5 | South Point Arena (90); Enterprise, NV |
| 12/27/2016*; 6:00 pm | | at Arizona | L 52–75 | 6–6 | McKale Center (1,206); Tucson, AZ |
Big Sky regular season
| 12/29/2016; 5:00 pm | | at North Dakota | L 61–65 | 6–7 (0–1) | Betty Engelstad Sioux Center (1,435); Grand Forks, ND |
| 12/31/2016; 12:00 pm | | at Northern Colorado | L 62–91 | 6–8 (0–2) | Bank of Colorado Arena (545); Greeley, CO |
| 01/07/2017; 12:00 pm | | at Sacramento State | W 88–86 | 7–8 (1–2) | Hornets Nest (334); Sacramento, CA |
| 01/12/2017; 7:00 pm | | Northern Arizona; Postponed (snow), rescheduled for 01/16/2017 | | | Peter Stott Center; Portland, OR |
| 01/14/2017; 2:00 pm | | Southern Utah | W 81–74 | 8–8 (2–2) | Peter Stott Center (278); Portland, OR |
| 01/16/2017; 2:00 pm | | Northern Arizona | W 56–55 | 9–8 (3–2) | Peter Stott Center (195); Portland, OR |
| 01/19/2017; 6:00 pm | | at Montana | W 64–44 | 10–8 (4–2) | Dahlberg Arena (2,579); Missoula, MT |
| 01/21/2017; 1:00 pm | | at Montana State | L 76–83 | 10–9 (4–3) | Worthington Arena (2,284); Bozeman, MT |
| 01/28/2017; 12:00 pm | | Sacramento State | L 68–77 | 10–10 (4–4) | Peter Stott Center (283); Portland, OR |
| 02/02/2017; 7:00 pm | | Idaho | L 66–72 | 10–11 (4–5) | Peter Stott Center (283); Portland, OR |
| 02/04/2017; 2:00 pm | | Eastern Washington | L 62–68 | 10–12 (4–6) | Peter Stott Center (250); Portland, OR |
| 02/09/2017; 6:00 pm | | at Idaho State | L 47–53 | 10–13 (4–7) | Reed Gym (1,022); Pocatello, ID |
| 02/11/2017; 1:00 pm | | at Weber State | L 75–85 | 10–14 (4–8) | Dee Events Center (963); Ogden, UT |
| 02/16/2017; 7:00 pm | | Montana State | W 69–65 | 11–14 (5–8) | Peter Stott Center (317); Portland, OR |
| 02/18/2017; 2:00 pm | | Montana | W 68–45 | 12–14 (6–8) | Peter Stott Center (323); Portland, OR |
| 02/23/2017; 6:00 pm | | at Southern Utah | L 64–82 | 12–15 (6–9) | Centrum Arena (981); Cedar City, UT |
| 02/25/2017; 3:00 pm | | at Northern Arizona | L 73–74 ^{OT} | 13–15 (7–9) | Walkup Skydome (540); Flagstaff, AZ |
| 03/01/2017; 12:00 pm | | Northern Colorado | L 50–57 | 13–16 (7–10) | Peter Stott Center (978); Portland, OR |
| 03/03/2017; 7:00 pm | | North Dakota | W 81–67 | 14–16 (8–10) | Peter Stott Center (323); Portland, OR |
Big Sky Women's Tournament
| 03/06/2017; 5:35 pm | (7) | vs. (10) Northern Arizona; First Round | W 88–76 | 15–16 | Reno Events Center (906); Reno, NV |
| 03/08/2017; 5:35 pm | (7) | vs. (2) North Dakota; Quarterfinals | W 65–62 | 16–16 | Reno Events Center (804); Reno, NV |
| 03/10/2017; 2:35 pm | (7) | vs. (6) Idaho State; Semifinals | L 50–54 | 16–17 | Reno Events Center (1,202); Reno, NV |
*Non-conference game. ^{#}Rankings from AP Poll. (#) Tournament seedings in parentheses. All times are in Pacific Time.

== See also ==
2016–17 Portland State Vikings men's basketball team
