= 2016–17 Idaho Vandals women's basketball team =

Intercollegiate basketball season

2016–17 Idaho Vandals women's basketball

WBI, Semifinals
- Conference: Big Sky Conference
- Record: 19–15 (11–7 Big Sky)
- Head coach: Jon Newlee (9th season)
- Assistant coaches: Christa Stanford; Jeri Jacobson; Steven Fennelly
- Home arena: Cowan Spectrum; Memorial Gym

2016–17 Big Sky women's basketball standings
	Conf.				Overall
Team	W		L	PCT	W		L	PCT
Montana State †	15	–	3	.833	25	–	7	.781
North Dakota	15	–	3	.833	20	–	11	.645
Northern Colorado	14	–	4	.778	22	–	8	.733
Eastern Washington	12	–	6	.667	19	–	14	.576
Idaho	11	–	7	.611	19	–	15	.559
Idaho State	10	–	8	.556	19	–	14	.576
Portland State	8	–	10	.444	16	–	17	.485
Weber State	6	–	12	.333	13	–	18	.419
Sacramento State	6	–	12	.333	10	–	20	.333
Northern Arizona	5	–	13	.278	9	–	21	.300
Montana	4	–	14	.222	7	–	23	.233
Southern Utah	2	–	16	.111	7	–	23	.233
† 2017 Big Sky tournament winner As of March 23, 2017; Rankings from AP poll

The 2016–17 Idaho Vandals women's basketball team represented the University of Idaho during the 2016–17 NCAA Division I women's basketball season. The Vandals, led by ninth-year head coach Jon Newlee, played their home games at the Cowan Spectrum with early-season games at Memorial Gym, both located in Moscow, Idaho, and were members of the Big Sky Conference. They finished the season 19–15, 11–7 in Big Sky play, to finish in fifth place. They advanced to the quarterfinals of the Big Sky women's tournament, where they lost to Eastern Washington. They were invited to the Women's Basketball Invitational, where they defeated Utah State in the first round and Eastern Washington in the quarterfinals before losing in the semifinals to Rice.

== Roster ==
2016–17 Idaho Vandals women's basketball team
Players
Coaches

Pos.	#	Name	Height	Year	Previous school	Hometown
G	1	Jenae Lewallen	5 ft 8 in (1.73 m)	Fr	Liberty HS	Surprise, AZ
G	2	Karlee Wilson	5 ft 4 in (1.63 m)	Sr	Lewiston HS	Lewiston, ID
F	4	Brooke Reilly	6 ft 1 in (1.85 m)	RS Jr	Mt. Spokane HS	Spokane, WA
C	5	Brigitte O'Neill	6 ft 2 in (1.88 m)	So	Carey Grammar	Melbourne, Australia
G	10	Cherita Daugherty	5 ft 8 in (1.73 m)	Fr	Prairie	Melbourne, Australia
C	11	Isabelle Hadden	6 ft 4 in (1.93 m)	Fr	Boise	Boise, ID
C	12	Nejra Solo	6 ft 5 in (1.96 m)	RS Jr	PRVA Gimnazija Zenica	Zenica, Bosnia
G	14	Taylor Pierce	5 ft 7 in (1.7 m)	So	La Costa Canyon HS	Carlsbad, CA
G	21	Mikayla Ferenz	5 ft 10 in (1.78 m)	So	Walla Walla HS	Walla Walla, WA
G	22	Bethany Krause	5 ft 8 in (1.73 m)	Jr	Centerville HS	Centerville, OH
G	24	Daylee Hanson	5 ft 11 in (1.8 m)	Fr	King's HS	Edmonds, WA
G/F	31	Geraldine McCorkell	6 ft 0 in (1.83 m)	Jr	Penleigh & Essendon Grammar	Melbourne, Australia
G	32	Agueda Trujillo	6 ft 0 in (1.83 m)	Sr	IES CTEIB	Manacor, Spain
F	44	Sue Winger	6 ft 1 in (1.85 m)	So	Mead HS	Spokane, WA

Head coach

- Jon Newlee (San Diego State)

Assistant coach(es)

- Christa Stanford (Idaho State)
- Jeri Jacobson (Upper Iowa)
- Steven Fennelly (Iowa State)

Legend

- (C) Team captain
- (S) Suspended
- (I) Ineligible
- (W) Walk-on
- Injured
- Current redshirt

Roster
Last update: January 7, 2025

== Schedule ==
Date time, TV	Rank^{#}	Opponent^{#}	Result	Record	Site (attendance) city, state
Exhibition
November 5, 2016*; 2:00 p.m.		Multnomah	W 83–45		Memorial Gym; Moscow, ID
Non-conference regular season
November 11, 2016*; 5:00 p.m.		at Seattle	W 68–64	1–0	Connolly Center (481); Seattle, WA
November 14, 2016*; 7:00 p.m.		at Cal State Fullerton	W 88–86	2–0	Titan Gym (247); Fullerton, CA
November 22, 2016*; 5:00 p.m.		at No. 15 Washington	L 53–105	2–1	Alaska Airlines Arena (1,531); Seattle, WA
November 25, 2016*; 2:00 p.m.		vs. Northern Iowa; GCU Thanksgiving Classic	L 74–76	2–2	GCU Arena (205); Phoenix, AZ
November 26, 2016*; 2:00 p.m.		at Grand Canyon; GCU Thanksgiving Classic	L 60–64	2–3	GCU Arena (638); Phoenix, AZ
December 2, 2016*; 8:30 p.m.		vs. No. 24 Oregon State; Maui Wahine Classic	L 49–60	2–4	War Memorial Gym (922); Wailuku, HI
December 3, 2016*; 6:30 p.m.		vs. UNLV; Maui Wahine Classic	L 61–73	2–5	War Memorial Gym (487); Wailuku, HI
December 9, 2016*; 5:30 p.m.		at Wyoming	W 75–71	3–5	Arena-Auditorium (2,309); Laramie, WY
December 17, 2016*; 3:00 p.m.		Central Washington	W 79–45	4–5	Memorial Gym; Moscow, ID
December 20, 2016*; 12:00 p.m.		at Oregon	L 70–73	4–6	Matthew Knight Arena (2,088); Eugene, OR
December 27, 2016*; 6:00 p.m.		Lewis–Clark State	W 85–49	5–6	Memorial Gym (433); Moscow, ID
Big Sky regular season
December 31, 2016; 2:00 p.m.		at Eastern Washington	L 57–67	5–7 (0–1)	Reese Court (680); Cheney, WA
January 5, 2017; 6:00 p.m.		at Montana	W 86–59	6–7 (1–1)	Dahlberg Arena (2,486); Missoula, MT
January 7, 2017; 2:00 p.m.		at Montana State	L 64–80	6–8 (1–2)	Worthington Arena (1,667); Bozeman, MT
January 12, 2017; 6:00 p.m.		Weber State	W 95–77	7–8 (2–2)	Cowan Spectrum (435); Moscow, ID
January 14, 2017; 2:00 p.m.		Idaho State	L 60–67	7–9 (2–3)	Cowan Spectrum (415); Moscow, ID
January 19, 2017; 6:30 p.m.		at Southern Utah	W 85–68	8–9 (3–3)	Centrum Arena (288); Cedar City, UT
January 21, 2017; 5:30 p.m.		at Northern Arizona	W 91–80	9–9 (4–3)	Walkup Skydome (597); Flagstaff, AZ
January 26, 2017; 6:00 p.m.		Montana State	L 61–66	9–10 (4–4)	Cowan Spectrum (903); Moscow, ID
January 28, 2017; 2:00 p.m.		Montana	W 75–50	10–10 (5–4)	Cowan Spectrum (738); Moscow, ID
February 2, 2017; 7:00 p.m.		at Portland State	W 72–66	11–10 (6–4)	Peter Stott Center (283); Portland, OR
February 4, 2017; 2:05 p.m.		at Sacramento State	W 72–58	12–10 (7–4)	Hornets Nest (302); Sacramento, CA
February 9, 2017; 6:00 p.m.		Northern Colorado	L 67–71	12–11 (7–5)	Cowan Spectrum (486); Moscow, ID
February 11, 2017; 2:00 p.m.		North Dakota	W 74–61	13–11 (8–5)	Cowan Spectrum (435); Moscow, ID
February 18, 2017; 2:00 p.m.		Eastern Washington	W 78–51	14–11 (9–5)	Cowan Spectrum (574); Moscow, ID
February 23, 2017; 6:00 p.m.		at Idaho State	L 69–80	14–12 (9–6)	Reed Gym (1,051); Pocatello, ID
February 25, 2017; 1:00 p.m.		at Weber State	W 82–77	15–12 (10–6)	Dee Events Center (746); Ogden, UT
March 1, 2017; 6:00 p.m.		Northern Arizona	L 61–76	15–13 (10–7)	Cowan Spectrum (533); Moscow, ID
March 3, 2017; 6:00 p.m.		Southern Utah	W 76–61	16–13 (11–7)	Cowan Spectrum (753); Moscow, ID
Big Sky women's tournament
March 6, 2017; 2:35 p.m.	(5)	vs. (12) Southern Utah; First round	W 83–68	17–13	Reno Events Center (672); Reno, NV
March 7, 2017; 2:35 p.m.	(5)	vs. (4) Eastern Washington; Quarterfinals	L 64–73	17–14	Reno Events Center (787); Reno, NV
WBI
March 15, 2017*; 5:30 p.m.		Utah State; First round	W 64–57	18–14	Cowan Spectrum; Moscow, ID
March 20, 2017*; 6:00 p.m.		at Eastern Washington; Quarterfinals	W 74–67	19–14	Reese Court; Cheney, WA
March 23, 2017*; 5:00 p.m.		at Rice; Semifinals	L 80–86	19–15	Tudor Fieldhouse (287); Houston, TX
*Non-conference game. ^{#}Rankings from AP poll. (#) Tournament seedings in parentheses. All times are in Pacific.

== See also ==
- 2016–17 Idaho Vandals men's basketball team
