= 2016–17 Northern Arizona Lumberjacks women's basketball team =

Intercollegiate basketball season

2016–17 Northern Arizona Lumberjacks women's basketball
- Conference: Big Sky Conference
- Record: 9–21 (5–13 Big Sky)
- Head coach: Sue Darling (5th season)
- Assistant coaches: Robyne Bostick; Karlie Burris; Jamie Rauchwarger
- Home arena: Walkup Skydome; Rolle Activity Center

2016–17 Big Sky women's basketball standings
	Conf.				Overall
Team	W		L	PCT	W		L	PCT
Montana State †	15	–	3	.833	25	–	7	.781
North Dakota	15	–	3	.833	20	–	11	.645
Northern Colorado	14	–	4	.778	22	–	8	.733
Eastern Washington	12	–	6	.667	19	–	14	.576
Idaho	11	–	7	.611	19	–	15	.559
Idaho State	10	–	8	.556	19	–	14	.576
Portland State	8	–	10	.444	16	–	17	.485
Weber State	6	–	12	.333	13	–	18	.419
Sacramento State	6	–	12	.333	10	–	20	.333
Northern Arizona	5	–	13	.278	9	–	21	.300
Montana	4	–	14	.222	7	–	23	.233
Southern Utah	2	–	16	.111	7	–	23	.233
† 2017 Big Sky tournament winner As of March 23, 2017; Rankings from AP poll

The 2016–17 Northern Arizona Lumberjacks women's basketball team represented Northern Arizona University during the 2016–17 NCAA Division I women's basketball season. The Lumberjacks, led by fifth-year head coach Sue Darling, played their home games at the Walkup Skydome and Rolle Activity Center, both in Flagstaff, Arizona. They were members of the Big Sky Conference. They finished the season 6–24, 2–16 in Big Sky play, to finish in tenth place. They lost in the first round of the Big Sky women's tournament to Portland State.

== Roster ==
2016–17 Northern Arizona Lumberjacks women's basketball team
Players
Coaches

Pos.	#	Name	Height	Year	Previous school	Hometown
G	1	Rene Coggins	5 ft 8 in (1.73 m)	Sr	Mountain View	Mesa, AZ
G	2	Raina Perez	5 ft 4 in (1.63 m)	Fr	Millennium	Buckeye, AZ
G	4	Brittani Lusain	5 ft 8 in (1.73 m)	Sr	Mater Dei Catholic	San Diego, CA
G	10	Passionate Amukamara	5 ft 7 in (1.7 m)	So	Millennium	Glendale, AZ
G	11	Olivia Lucero	5 ft 8 in (1.73 m)	RS So	Highland; Loyola Marymount	Gilbert, AZ
F	12	Kenna McDavis	6 ft 1 in (1.85 m)	RS Jr	Pinnacle HS; Boise State	Phoenix, AZ
F	20	Va'e Malufau	5 ft 11 in (1.8 m)	Fr	Punahou	Kahuku, HI
F	22	Catelyn Preston	5 ft 10 in (1.78 m)	Sr	Oregon City	Oregon City, OR
F	23	Kaleigh Paplow	5 ft 8 in (1.73 m)	So	Lutheran	Parker, CO
F	24	Shay Young	5 ft 11 in (1.8 m)	RS Sr	Mount Miguel; New Mexico State	San Diego, CA
F	25	Brianna Lehew	6 ft 1 in (1.85 m)	Fr	Thunderbird	Phoenix, AZ
F	33	Peyton Carroll	6 ft 2 in (1.88 m)	Fr	Clackamas	Damascus, OR
G	34	Taylor Leyva	5 ft 11 in (1.8 m)	Sr	Pueblo West	Pueblo West, CO
G	50	Bradlee Cotton	6 ft 0 in (1.83 m)	Sr	Denver School S&T	Denver, CO
C	54	Alyssa Rader	6 ft 2 in (1.88 m)	So	Horizon	Thornton, CO

Head coach

- Sue Darling (Arizona)

Assistant coach(es)

- Robyne Bostick (Saint Joseph's)
- Karlie Burris (Portland)
- Jamie Rauchwarger (Cal State Northridge)

Legend

- (C) Team captain
- (S) Suspended
- (I) Ineligible
- (W) Walk-on
- Injured
- Current redshirt

Roster
Last update: October 4, 2024

== Schedule ==
Date time, TV	Rank^{#}	Opponent^{#}	Result	Record	Site (attendance) city, state
Non-conference regular season
November 11, 2016*; 7:00 p.m.		at UTEP	W 65–51	1–0	Don Haskins Center (1,328); El Paso, TX
November 13, 2016*; 12:00 p.m.		Antelope Valley	W 109–60	2–0	Rolle Activity Center (264); Flagstaff, AZ
November 18, 2016*; 8:00 p.m.		at Cal Poly	L 53–58	2–1	Mott Athletic Center (260); San Luis Obispo, CA
November 20, 2016*; 3:00 p.m.		at UC Santa Barbara	L 51–60	2–2	The Thunderdome (631); Santa Barbara, CA
November 23, 2016*; 6:00 p.m.		at Lamar	L 60–75	2–3	Montagne Center (563); Beaumont, TX
November 28, 2016*; 6:30 p.m.		Youngstown State	W 70–49	3–3	Rolle Activity Center (128); Flagstaff, AZ
December 1, 2016*; 11:00 a.m., FSAZ/FCSP		Cal State Northridge	L 79–83	3–4	Walkup Skydome (1,440); Flagstaff, AZ
December 3, 2016*; 11:00 a.m.		Denver	W 82–67	4–4	Walkup Skydome (258); Flagstaff, AZ
December 11, 2016*; 12:00 p.m., FSAZ/FCSP		New Mexico State	L 68–79	4–5	Rolle Activity Center (218); Flagstaff, AZ
December 19, 2016*; 12:00 p.m.		at Grand Canyon	L 65–76	4–6	GCU Arena (404); Phoenix, AZ
December 21, 2016*; 2:00 p.m.		at Utah	L 65–78	4–7	Jon M. Huntsman Center (978); Salt Lake City, UT
Big Sky regular season
December 31, 2016; 2:00 p.m.		at Southern Utah	W 77–68	5–7 (1–0)	Centrum Arena (576); Cedar City, UT
January 5, 2016; 6:30 p.m.		North Dakota	L 78–80	5–8 (1–1)	Walkup Skydome (131); Flagstaff, AZ
January 7, 2017; 2:00 p.m.		Northern Colorado	L 66–69	5–9 (1–2)	Walkup Skydome (256); Flagstaff, AZ
January 12, 2017; 8:00 p.m.		at Portland State; Postponed (snow), rescheduled for January 16, 2017			Peter Stott Center; Portland, OR
January 14, 2017; 3:05 p.m.		at Sacramento State	L 76–82	5–10 (1–3)	Hornets Nest (416); Sacramento, CA
January 16, 2017; 3:00 p.m.		at Portland State	L 55–56	5–11 (1–4)	Peter Stott Center (195); Portland, OR
January 19, 2017; 6:30 p.m., FSAZ/FCSP		Eastern Washington	W 56–47	6–11 (2–4)	Walkup Skydome (249); Flagstaff, AZ
January 21, 2017; 6:30 p.m., FSAZ/FCSP		Idaho	L 80–91	6–12 (2–5)	Walkup Skydome (597); Flagstaff, AZ
January 26, 2017; 7:00 p.m.		at Northern Colorado	L 64–75	6–13 (2–6)	Bank of Colorado Arena (902); Greeley, CO
January 28, 2017; 1:00 p.m., FSNOR+/FCSP		at North Dakota	L 69–88	6–14 (2–7)	Betty Engelstad Sioux Center (1,802); Grand Forks, ND
February 2, 2017; 6:30 p.m., FSAZ+/FCSP		Idaho State	L 51–64	6–15 (2–8)	Walkup Skydome (389); Flagstaff, AZ
February 4, 2017; 6:30 p.m., FSAZ/FCSP		Weber State	L 64–75	6–16 (2–9)	Walkup Skydome (454); Flagstaff, AZ
February 9, 2017; 7:00 p.m.		at Montana State	L 69–86	6–17 (2–10)	Worthington Arena (1,546); Bozeman, MT
February 11, 2017; 2:00 p.m.		at Montana	L 59–60	6–18 (2–11)	Dahlberg Arena (2,722); Missoula, MT
February 18, 2017; 2:00 p.m., FSAZ/FCSP		Southern Utah	W 77–65	7–18 (3–11)	Walkup Skydome (594); Flagstaff, AZ
February 23, 2017; 6:30 p.m., FSAZ+/FCSP		Sacramento State	W 91–88	8–18 (4–11)	Walkup Skydome (513); Flagstaff, AZ
February 25, 2017; 2:00 p.m., FSAZ/FCSC		Portland State	L 73–74 ^{OT}	8–19 (4–12)	Walkup Skydome (540); Flagstaff, AZ
March 1, 2017; 7:00 p.m.		at Idaho	W 76–61	9–19 (5–12)	Cowan Spectrum (533); Moscow, ID
March 3, 2017; 7:00 p.m.		at Eastern Washington	L 64–79	9–20 (5–13)	Reese Court (1,003); Cheney, WA
Big Sky women's tournament
March 6, 2017; 6:35 p.m.	(10)	vs. (7) Portland State; First round	L 76–88	9–21	Reno Events Center (906); Reno, NV
*Non-conference game. ^{#}Rankings from AP poll. (#) Tournament seedings in parentheses. All times are in Mountain.

== See also ==
- 2016–17 Northern Arizona Lumberjacks men's basketball team
