= 2016–17 Weber State Wildcats women's basketball team =

Intercollegiate basketball season

2016–17 Weber State Wildcats women's basketball
- Conference: Big Sky Conference
- Record: 13–18 (6–12 Big Sky)
- Head coach: Bethann Ord (5th season)
- Assistant coaches: JD Gustin; Devan Newman; Matt Thune
- Home arena: Dee Events Center

2016–17 Big Sky women's basketball standings
| | Conf. | | | | Overall |
| Team | W | | L | PCT | W | | L | PCT |
|---|---|---|---|---|---|---|---|---|
| Montana State † | 15 | – | 3 | .833 | 25 | – | 7 | .781 |
| North Dakota | 15 | – | 3 | .833 | 20 | – | 11 | .645 |
| Northern Colorado | 14 | – | 4 | .778 | 22 | – | 8 | .733 |
| Eastern Washington | 12 | – | 6 | .667 | 19 | – | 14 | .576 |
| Idaho | 11 | – | 7 | .611 | 19 | – | 15 | .559 |
| Idaho State | 10 | – | 8 | .556 | 19 | – | 14 | .576 |
| Portland State | 8 | – | 10 | .444 | 16 | – | 17 | .485 |
| Weber State | 6 | – | 12 | .333 | 13 | – | 18 | .419 |
| Sacramento State | 6 | – | 12 | .333 | 10 | – | 20 | .333 |
| Northern Arizona | 5 | – | 13 | .278 | 9 | – | 21 | .300 |
| Montana | 4 | – | 14 | .222 | 7 | – | 23 | .233 |
| Southern Utah | 2 | – | 16 | .111 | 7 | – | 23 | .233 |
† 2017 Big Sky tournament winner As of March 23, 2017; Rankings from AP poll

The 2016–17 Weber State Wildcats women's basketball team represented Weber State University during the 2016–17 NCAA Division I women's basketball season. The Wildcats were led by fifth year head coach Bethann Ord and played their home games at the Dee Events Center. They were members of the Big Sky Conference. They finished the season 13–18, 6–12 in Big Sky play to finish in a tie for eighth place. They advanced to the quarterfinals of the Big Sky women's tournament, where they lost to Montana State.

== Radio Broadcasts ==
All Wildcats games will be heard on KWCR with Nick Bailey calling the action. All home games and conference road games will also be streamed with video live online through Watch Big Sky.

== Roster ==
2016–17 Weber State Wildcats women's basketball team
Players
Coaches

| Pos. | # | Name | Height | Year | Previous school | Hometown |
|---|---|---|---|---|---|---|
| G | 0 | Jaiamoni Welch-Coleman | 5 ft 3 in (1.6 m) | So | Berkeley | Berkeley, CA |
| F | 1 | Jocelyn Adams | 6 ft 1 in (1.85 m) | Jr | Skyview | Vancouver, WA |
| G | 2 | Deeshyra Thomas | 5 ft 6 in (1.68 m) | Sr | Clackamas | Clackamas, OR |
| G | 4 | Kailie Quinn | 5 ft 9 in (1.75 m) | Jr | Judge | Salt Lake City, UT |
| G | 11 | Zharia Hale | 5 ft 10 in (1.78 m) | Fr | Central Catholic | Portland, OR |
| G | 12 | Yarden Danan | 5 ft 10 in (1.78 m) | So | Kiryat Sharet Holon | Rehovot, Israel |
| G | 13 | Payton Whitmore | 5 ft 6 in (1.68 m) | Fr | Hamilton | Mesa, AZ |
| G | 14 | Danielle Craft | 5 ft 11 in (1.8 m) | Fr | Ponderosa | Albuquerque, NM |
| G | 20 | Emily Drake | 5 ft 9 in (1.75 m) | So | Pullman | Pullman, WA |
| F | 22 | Audrey Frison | 6 ft 1 in (1.85 m) | Jr | David Douglas; Central Arizona | Portland, OR |
| F | 24 | Dominique Williams | 6 ft 0 in (1.83 m) | Fr | Centennial | Meridian, ID |
| F | 41 | Tyschal Blake | 6 ft 1 in (1.85 m) | RS Fr | St. Mary's Academy | Portland, OR |

Head coach

- Bethann Ord (UMBC)

Assistant coach(es)

- JD Gustin (Montana Western)
- Laura Terry (Louisville)
- Matt Thune (Indiana)

Legend

- (C) Team captain
- (S) Suspended
- (I) Ineligible
- (W) Walk-on
- Injured
- Current redshirt

Roster

== Schedule ==
| Date time, TV | Rank^{#} | Opponent^{#} | Result | Record | Site (attendance) city, state |
Exhibition
| 11/07/2016*; 7:00 pm | | Montana Western | W 74–67 | | Dee Events Center; Ogden, UT |
Non-conference regular season
| 11/11/2016*; 5:00 pm | | California Miramar | W 75–69 | 1–0 | Dee Events Center; Ogden, UT |
| 11/16/2016*; 3:30 pm | | at Utah Valley | W 64–61 | 2–0 | UCCU Center (484); Orem, UT |
| 11/19/2016*; 4:00 pm | | at Air Force | W 76–61 | 3–0 | Clune Arena (280); Colorado Springs, CO |
| 11/22/2016*; 7:00 pm | | Westminster | W 81–68 | 4–0 | Dee Events Center (607); Ogden, UT |
| 11/25/2016*; 10:00 am | | at FIU; FIU Thanksgiving Tournament semifinals | W 64–61 ^{OT} | 5–0 | FIU Arena (331); Miami, FL |
| 11/26/2016*; 10:00 am | | vs. Stetson; FIU Thanksgiving Tournament championship | L 68–70 ^{OT} | 5–1 | FIU Arena; Miami, FL |
| 12/03/2016*; 2:00 pm | | Portland | W 76–37 | 6–1 | Dee Events Center (836); Ogden, UT |
| 12/07/2016*; 11:00 pm, BYUtv | | at BYU | L 64–73 | 6–2 | Marriott Center (5,046); Provo, UT |
| 12/09/2016*; 7:00 pm | | Cal State Northridge | L 78–89 | 6–3 | Dee Events Center (682); Ogden, UT |
| 12/17/2016*; 1:00 pm | | at Utah | L 52–71 | 6–4 | Jon M. Huntsman Center (925); Salt Lake City, UT |
| 12/19/2016*; 12:00 pm | | Fresno State | L 57–60 | 6–5 | Dee Events Center (3,651); Ogden, UT |
Big Sky regular season
| 12/29/2016; 7:00 pm | | Montana State | L 68–83 | 6–6 (0–1) | Dee Events Center (628); Ogden, UT |
| 12/31/2016; 2:00 pm | | Montana | W 74–58 | 7–6 (1–1) | Dee Events Center (758); Ogden, UT |
| 01/07/2017; 2:00 pm | | Idaho State | W 50–43 | 8–6 (2–1) | Dee Events Center (748); Ogden, UT |
| 01/12/2017; 8:00 pm | | at Idaho | L 77–95 | 8–7 (2–2) | Cowan Spectrum (435); Moscow, ID |
| 01/14/2017; 3:00 pm | | at Eastern Washington | L 85–99 | 8–8 (2–3) | Reese Court (580); Cheney, WA |
| 01/19/2017; 7:00 pm | | North Dakota | L 65–70 | 8–9 (2–4) | Dee Events Center; Ogden, UT |
| 01/21/2017; 2:00 pm | | Northern Colorado | L 79–88 | 8–10 (2–5) | Dee Events Center (572); Ogden, UT |
| 01/28/2017; 2:00 pm | | at Idaho State | L 52–57 | 8–11 (2–6) | Reed Gym (1,031); Pocatello, ID |
| 02/02/2017; 7:00 pm | | at Southern Utah | W 73–68 | 9–11 (3–6) | Centrum Arena (1,107); Cedar City, UT |
| 02/04/2017; 6:30 pm | | at Northern Arizona | W 75–64 | 10–11 (4–6) | Walkup Skydome (454); Flagstaff, AZ |
| 02/09/2017; 12:00 pm | | Sacramento State | W 66–60 | 11–11 (5–6) | Dee Events Center (1,046); Ogden, UT |
| 02/11/2017; 2:00 pm | | Portland State | W 85–75 | 12–11 (6–6) | Dee Events Center (963); Ogden, UT |
| 02/16/2017; 7:00 pm | | at Northern Colorado | L 62–86 | 12–12 (6–7) | Bank of Colorado Arena (1,184); Greeley, CO |
| 02/18/2017; 3:00 pm | | at North Dakota | L 67–83 | 12–13 (6–8) | Betty Engelstad Sioux Center (1,682); Grand Forks, ND |
| 02/23/2017; 7:00 pm | | Eastern Washington | L 42–70 | 12–14 (6–9) | Dee Events Center (637); Ogden, UT |
| 02/25/2017; 2:00 pm | | Idaho | L 77–82 | 12–15 (6–10) | Dee Events Center (746); Ogden, UT |
| 03/01/2017; 7:00 pm | | at Montana | L 46–71 | 12–16 (6–11) | Dahlberg Arena (3,296); Missoula, MT |
| 03/03/2017; 7:00 pm | | at Montana State | L 53–72 | 12–17 (6–12) | Worthington Arena (2,478); Bozeman, MT |
Big Sky Women's Tournament
| 03/06/2017; 1:05 pm | (8) | vs. (9) Sacramento State; First Round | W 98–97 ^{OT} | 13–17 | Reno Events Center (672); Reno, NV |
| 03/08/2017; 1:05 pm | (8) | vs. (1) Montana State; Quarterfinals | L 53–65 | 13–18 | Reno Events Center (787); Reno, NV |
*Non-conference game. ^{#}Rankings from AP Poll. (#) Tournament seedings in parentheses. All times are in Mountain Time.

== See also ==
2016–17 Weber State Wildcats men's basketball team
