= 2017 Women's Basketball Invitational =

American women's college basketball tournament

- Season: 2016–17
- Teams: 16
- Champions: Rice

The 2017 Women's Basketball Invitational (WBI) is a single-elimination tournament of 16 National Collegiate Athletic Association (NCAA) Division I teams that did not participate in the 2017 NCAA Division I women's basketball tournament or 2017 Women's National Invitation Tournament. The 2017 field was announced on March 13. First round WBI games took place on March 15 and 16; second-round games were played March 18 and March 19. The tournament semifinals were held March 23 with the 2017 WBI Championship game played the final weekend of March. Rice won the WBI for the first time ever, beating UNC Greensboro, 74–62.

== Bracket ==
First Round; March 15–16
Idaho	64
Utah State	57
Texas State	62
Eastern Washington	66*
Rice	73
Lamar	72
Texas–Rio Grande Valley	62
Stephen F. Austin	54

Quarterfinals; March 18–19
Idaho	74
Eastern Washington	67
Rice	73
Texas–Rio Grande Valley	63

Semifinals; March 23
Idaho	80
Rice	86

First Round; March 15–16
UMBC	75
Brown	81
Charleston Southern	37
UNC Greensboro	45
Milwaukee	81
Southern Illinois	53
Campbell	68
Saint Francis	79

Quarterfinals; March 18–19
Brown	84
UNCG	87
Milwaukee	67
Saint Francis	57

Semifinals; March 23
UNCG	59
Milwaukee	49

=== WBI Championship Game ===
Championship game March 26
UNCG	62
Rice	74

* - Denotes overtime period
