= 2016–17 Pepperdine Waves women's basketball team =

Intercollegiate basketball season

2016–17 Pepperdine Waves women's basketball
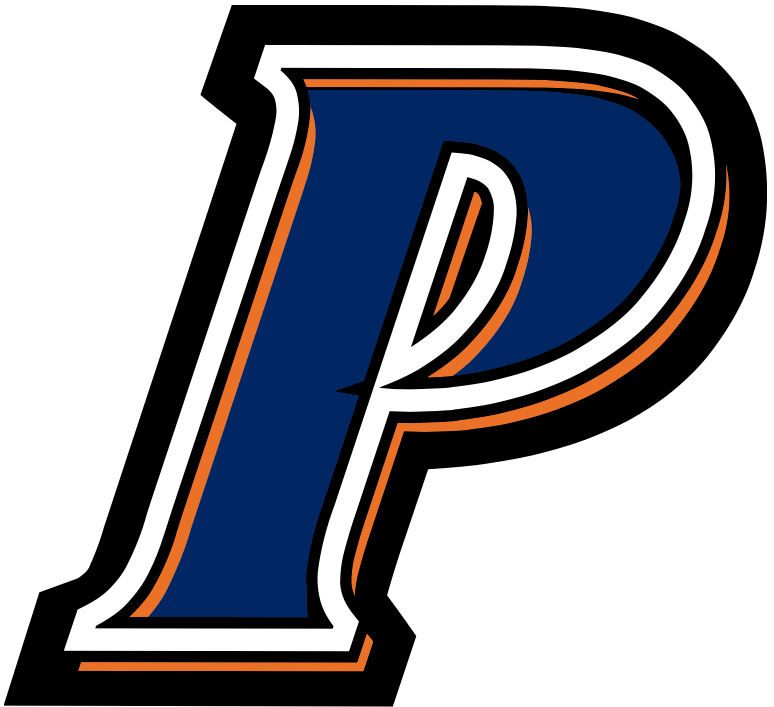
- Conference: West Coast Conference
- Record: 7–23 (5–13 WCC)
- Head coach: Ryan Weisenberg (4th season)
- Assistant coaches: Josh Pace; Darron Larsen; DeLisha Milton-Jones
- Home arena: Firestone Fieldhouse

2016–17 West Coast Conference women's basketball standings
	Conf.				Overall
Team	W		L	PCT	W		L	PCT
Gonzaga†	14	–	4	.778	26	–	7	.788
BYU	13	–	5	.722	20	–	12	.625
Saint Mary's	13	–	5	.722	20	–	13	.606
San Francisco	11	–	7	.611	18	–	13	.581
Loyola Marymount	9	–	9	.500	14	–	16	.467
Santa Clara	9	–	9	.500	14	–	16	.467
San Diego	7	–	11	.389	14	–	16	.467
Pacific	5	–	13	.278	10	–	21	.323
Pepperdine	5	–	13	.278	7	–	23	.233
Portland	4	–	14	.222	6	–	24	.200
† 2017 WCC tournament winner As of March 18, 2017; Rankings from AP poll

The 2016–17 Pepperdine Waves women's basketball team represented Pepperdine University in the 2016–17 NCAA Division I women's basketball season. The Waves, members of the West Coast Conference, were led by fourth year coach Ryan Weisenberg. The Waves played their home games at the Firestone Fieldhouse on the university campus in Malibu, California. They finished the season 7–23, 5–13 in WCC play to finish in a tie for eighth place. They lost in the first round of the WCC women's tournament to Pacific.

On March 8, Ryan Weisenberg was fired. He finished at Pepperdine with a 4-year record of 28–94.

== Roster ==
2016–17 Pepperdine Waves women's basketball team
Players
Coaches

Pos.	#	Name	Height	Year	Previous school	Hometown
G	1	Sydney Bordanaro	5 ft 7 in (1.7 m)	RS Fr	Burrell	Pittsburgh, PA
G	3	Kim Jacobs	5 ft 10 in (1.78 m)	Jr	Agoura	Agoura Hills, CA
C	5	Megan House	6 ft 4 in (1.93 m)	So	Serra	Oceanside, CA
G	10	Paige Fescke	5 ft 4 in (1.63 m)	So	Chaminade	Studio City, CA
G	11	Alex Kalmbach	5 ft 9 in (1.75 m)	RS So	Bishop O'Dowd; Ventura College	Piedmont, CA
F	12	Hayley Duren	6 ft 4 in (1.93 m)	Fr	American Heritage	Fort Lauderdale, FL
G	15	Keyari Sleezer	5 ft 11 in (1.8 m)	So	South Medford	Medford, OR
G	21	Kayla Blair	5 ft 9 in (1.75 m)	So	Vanden HS	Fairfield, CA
G	22	Allie Green	5 ft 10 in (1.78 m)	Sr	Sacramento Charter	Sacramento, CA
G	23	Barbara Sitanggan	5 ft 6 in (1.68 m)	Fr	Troy HS	Fullerton, CA
F	24	Lauren Craig	6 ft 2 in (1.88 m)	Fr	Saint Francis Catholic HS	Sacramento, CA
F	25	Yasmine Robinson-Bacote	5 ft 11 in (1.8 m)	So	Hillside	Hillside, NJ
F	33	Rebecca Lazuka	6 ft 2 in (1.88 m)	Fr	Troy HS	Fullerton, CA

Head coach

- Ryan Weisenberg (Cal Poly)

Assistant coach(es)

- Josh Pace (Syracuse)
- Darron Larsen (Massey)
- DeLisha Milton-Jones (Florida)

Legend

- (C) Team captain
- (S) Suspended
- (I) Ineligible
- (W) Walk-on
- Injured
- Current redshirt

Roster

== Schedule ==
Date time, TV	Rank^{#}	Opponent^{#}	Result	Record	Site (attendance) city, state
Exhibition
10/29/2016*; 6:00 pm		Antelope Valley	L 72–76		Firestone Fieldhouse; Malibu, CA
Non-conference regular season
11/13/2016*; 1:00 pm		Long Beach State	L 41–44	0–1	Firestone Fieldhouse (211); Malibu, CA
11/15/2016*; 7:00 pm		at UC Santa Barbara	L 57–66	0–2	The Thunderdome (532); Santa Barbara, CA
11/20/2016*; 1:00 pm		Nevada	L 60–69	0–3	Firestone Fieldhouse (271); Malibu, CA
11/23/2016*; 12:00 pm		at New Mexico State	L 66–74	0–4	Pan American Center; Las Cruces, NM
11/27/2016*; 12:00 pm		Duke	L 65–99	0–5	Firestone Fieldhouse (303); Malibu, CA
11/29/2016*; 7:00 pm		at Utah Valley	L 65–72	0–6	UCCU Center (181); Orem, UT
12/03/2016*; 4:00 pm		at Cal Poly	L 52–62	0–7	Mott Athletic Center (768); San Luis Obispo, CA
12/06/2016*; 11:00 am		at Denver	L 67–75	0–8	Magness Arena (239); Denver, CO
12/09/2016*; 1:00 pm		UNLV	L 61–68	0–9	Firestone Fieldhouse (538); Malibu, CA
12/17/2016*; 6:00 pm		at Cal State Fullerton	W 69–58	1–9	Titan Gym (158); Fullerton, CA
12/19/2016*; 12:00 pm		Cal State Bakersfield	W 62–57 ^{OT}	2–9	Firestone Fieldhouse (197); Malibu, CA
WCC regular season
12/29/2016; 7:00 pm		Gonzaga	W 79–69	3–9 (1–0)	Firestone Fieldhouse (337); Malibu, CA
12/31/2016; 1:00 pm		Portland	L 61–71	3–10 (1–1)	Firestone Fieldhouse; Malibu, CA
01/05/2017; 7:00 pm		at Loyola Marymount	L 60–72	3–11 (1–2)	Gersten Pavilion (351); Los Angeles, CA
01/07/2017; 7:00 pm		at San Diego	W 55–42	4–11 (2–2)	Jenny Craig Pavilion (318); San Diego, CA
01/12/2017; 7:00 pm		Pacific	W 59–58	5–11 (3–2)	Firestone Fieldhouse (217); Malibu, CA
01/14/2017; 2:00 pm		at Santa Clara	L 40–61	5–12 (3–3)	Leavey Center (550); Santa Clara, CA
01/19/2017; 7:00 pm		BYU	L 47–73	5–13 (3–4)	Firestone Fieldhouse (178); Malibu, CA
01/21/2017; 1:00 pm		Saint Mary's	L 60–81	5–14 (3–5)	Firestone Fieldhouse (267); Malibu, CA
01/26/2017; 7:00 pm		at Portland	L 55–75	5–15 (3–6)	Chiles Center (213); Portland, OR
01/28/2017; 2:00 pm		at Gonzaga	L 61–83	5–16 (3–7)	McCarthey Athletic Center (6,000); Spokane, WA
02/02/2017; 7:00 pm		San Francisco	W 81–59	6–16 (4–7)	Firestone Fieldhouse (242); Malibu, CA
02/04/2017; 2:00 pm		at Pacific	L 79–80 ^{OT}	6–17 (4–8)	Alex G. Spanos Center (824); Stockton, CA
02/09/2017; 6:00 pm, BYUtv		at BYU	L 49–88	6–18 (4–9)	Marriott Center (1,049); Provo, UT
02/11/2017; 1:00 pm		San Diego	W 57–40	7–18 (5–9)	Firestone Fieldhouse (197); Malibu, CA
02/16/2017; 7:00 pm		Santa Clara	L 48–69	7–19 (5–10)	Firestone Fieldhouse (202); Malibu, CA
02/18/2017; 1:00 pm		Loyola Marymount	L 78–87	7–20 (5–11)	Firestone Fieldhouse (218); Malibu, CA
02/23/2017; 7:00 pm		at Saint Mary's	L 57–84	7–21 (5–12)	McKeon Pavilion (312); Moraga, CA
02/25/2017; 2:00 pm		at San Francisco	L 78–84	7–22 (5–13)	War Memorial Gymnasium (410); San Francisco, CA
WCC Women's Tournament
03/02/2017; 12:00 pm, BYUtv	(9)	vs. (8) Pacific; First Round	L 55–73	7–23	Orleans Arena; Paradise, NV
*Non-conference game. ^{#}Rankings from AP Poll. (#) Tournament seedings in parentheses. All times are in Pacific Time.

== See also ==
- 2016–17 Pepperdine Waves men's basketball team
