= 2017 West Coast Conference women's basketball tournament =

- Classification: Division I
- Season: 2016–17
- Teams: 10
- Finals site: Orleans Arena; Paradise, Nevada
- Champions: Gonzaga (7th title)
- Winning coach: Lisa Fortier (1st title)
- MVP: Jill Barta (Gonzaga)
- Attendance: 35,308
- Television: ESPNU/BYUtv

2016–17 West Coast Conference women's basketball standings
	Conf.				Overall
Team	W		L	PCT	W		L	PCT
Gonzaga†	14	–	4	.778	26	–	7	.788
BYU	13	–	5	.722	20	–	12	.625
Saint Mary's	13	–	5	.722	20	–	13	.606
San Francisco	11	–	7	.611	18	–	13	.581
Loyola Marymount	9	–	9	.500	14	–	16	.467
Santa Clara	9	–	9	.500	14	–	16	.467
San Diego	7	–	11	.389	14	–	16	.467
Pacific	5	–	13	.278	10	–	21	.323
Pepperdine	5	–	13	.278	7	–	23	.233
Portland	4	–	14	.222	6	–	24	.200
† 2017 WCC tournament winner As of March 18, 2017; Rankings from AP poll

The 2017 West Coast Conference women's basketball tournament was held March 2–7, 2017, at Orleans Arena in the Las Vegas Valley community of Paradise, Nevada. Seeds were determined solely on conference record. Regular-season champion Gonzaga added the tournament crown to its résumé, earning the conference's automatic bid to the 2017 NCAA Division I women's basketball tournament.

== Seeds ==
WCC tiebreaker procedures went as follows:

1. Head-to-head
2. Record against the top-seeded team(s) not involved in the tie, going down through the seedings as needed
3. Higher RPI

Seed	School	Conference	Overall*	Tiebreaker
1	Gonzaga	14–4	23–6	
2	BYU	13–5	19–10	1–1 vs. Gonzaga
3	Saint Mary's	13–5	18–11	0–2 vs. Gonzaga
4	San Francisco	11–7	17–12	
5	Loyola Marymount	9–9	14–15	1–1 vs. Saint Mary's
6	Santa Clara	9–9	14–15	0–2 vs. Saint Mary's
7	San Diego	7–11	13–15	
8	Pepperdine	5–13	7–22	2–0 vs. San Diego
9	Pacific	5–13	9–20	0–2 vs. San Diego
10	Portland	4–14	6–23	

* Overall record at end of regular season.

== Schedule ==
Session	Game	Time*	Matchup^{#}	Television	Attendance
First round – Thursday March 2, 2017
1	1	12:00 PM	#8 Pepperdine 55 vs. #9 Pacific 73	BYUtv	7,089
1	2	2:00 PM	#7 San Diego 74 vs. #10 Portland 47	BYUtv	7,089
Quarterfinals – Thursday, March 2 & Friday March 3, 2017
2	3	6:00 PM	#3 Saint Mary's 60 vs. #6 Santa Clara 57	BYUtv	7,089
2	4	8:00 PM	#4 San Francisco 80 vs. #5 Loyola Marymount 67	BYUtv	7,089
3	5	12:00 PM	#1 Gonzaga 91 vs. #9 Pacific 59	BYUtv	7,209
3	6	2:00 PM	#2 BYU 75 vs. #7 San Diego 66 (OT)	BYUtv	7,209
Semifinals – Monday, March 6, 2017
4	7	12:00 PM	#1 Gonzaga 77 vs #4 San Francisco 46	BYUtv	7,148
4	8	2:00 PM	#2 BYU 49 vs #3 Saint Mary's 59	BYUtv	7,148
Championship – Tuesday, March 7, 2017
5	9	1:00 PM	#1 Gonzaga 86 vs. #3 Saint Mary's 75	ESPNU	6,773
*Game times in PT. #-Rankings denote tournament seeding.

== Bracket and Scores ==
- All BYUtv games were simulcast online and streamed at TheW.tv.

First round
8	Pepperdine	55
9	Pacific	73
7	San Diego	74
10	Portland	47

Quarterfinals
1	Gonzaga	91
8	Pacific	59
4	San Francisco	80
5	Loyola Marymount	67
2	BYU	75^{OT}
7	San Diego	66
3	Saint Mary's	60
6	Santa Clara	57

Semifinals
1	Gonzaga	77
4	San Francisco	46
2	BYU	49
3	Saint Mary's	59

Championship
1	Gonzaga	86
3	Saint Mary's	75

== Game summaries ==
=== First round ===
==== #8 Pacific vs. #9 Pepperdine ====
Broadcasters: Spencer Linton & Kristen Kozlowski
Series History: Pacific leads series 7–3

BYUtv

Mar 2
12:00 PM PST

#9 Pepperdine Waves 55, #8 Pacific Tigers 73
Scoring by quarter: 15–15, 15–20, 15–13, 10–25
Pts: Yasmine Robinson-Bacote 18; Rebs: Yasmine Robinson-Bacote 13; Asts: 3 with 3	Pts: Chelsea Lidy 16; Rebs: 3 with 7 Asts: GeAnna Luaulu-Summers 9

Orleans Arena
Paradise, NV
Attendance: 7,089
Referees: Darren Krzesnik, Cheryl Flores, Paul Patterson

==== #7 San Diego vs. #10 Portland ====
Broadcasters: Spencer Linton & Kristen Kozlowski
Series History: Series –

BYUtv

Mar 2
2:15 PM PST

#7 San Diego Toreros 74, #10 Portland Pilots 47
Scoring by quarter: 14–8, 15–10, 24–15, 21–14
Pts: A. Ward-El 15; Rebs: C. Buhr 8 Asts: C. Woodward 4	Pts: K. Van Loo 16; Rebs: J. Spencer 6 Asts: K. Van Loo 3

Orleans Arena
Paradise, NV
Attendance: 7,089
Referees: Richard Waters, Karen Lasuik, Kenneth Nash

=== Quarterfinals ===
==== #3 St. Mary's vs. #6 Santa Clara ====
Broadcasters: Dave McCann & Blaine Fowler
Series History: Series –

BYUtv

Mar 2
6:00 PM PST

#3 Saint Mary's Gaels 60, #6 Santa Clara Broncos 57
Scoring by quarter: 12–13, 11–19, 22–12, 15–13
Pts: S. Raggio 19; Rebs: S. Raggio 9 Asts: M. McKay 4	Pts: E. Wolph 16; Rebs: M. McGwire 7 Asts: 2 with 3

Orleans Arena
Paradise, NV
Attendance: 7,089

==== #4 San Francisco vs. #5 Loyola Marymount ====
Broadcasters: Dave McCann & Kristen Kozlowski
Series History: Series –

BYUtv

Mar 2
8:15 PM PST

#4 San Francisco Dons 80, #5 Loyola Marymount Lions 67
Scoring by quarter: 20–18, 21–16, 13–18, 26–15
Pts: A. Seilund, K. Simon 19; Rebs: M. Rakova 11; Asts: K. Simon 5 M. Rakova: Double-Double with 16 pts and 11 rebs	Pts: C. Wallace 19; Rebs: J. Johnson 12; Asts: 3 with 3

Orleans Arena
Paradise, NV
Attendance: 7,089

==== #1 Gonzaga vs. #9 Pacific ====
Broadcasters: Spencer Linton & Kristen Kozlowski
Series History: Series –

BYUtv

Mar 3
12:00 PM

#1 Gonzaga Bulldogs 91, #9 Pacific Tigers 59
Scoring by quarter: 15–13, 22–17, 26–6, 28–23
Pts: J. Barta 22; Rebs: K. Kudron 11; Asts: L. Stockton 5	Pts: G. Luaulu-Summers 18; Rebs: J. Grant 9 Asts: 2 with 3

Orleans Arena
Paradise, NV
Attendance: 7,209

==== #2 BYU vs. #7 San Diego ====
Broadcasters: Spencer Linton & Kristen Kozlowski
Series History: Series –

BYUtv

Mar 3
2:15 PM PST

#2 BYU Cougars 75, #7 San Diego Toreros 66 (OT)
Scoring by quarter: 7–21, 18–15, 20–12, 14–11, Overtime: 16–7
Pts: C. Broadhead 22; Rebs: K. Purcell 16; Asts: K. Nielson 4	Pts: A. El-Ward 18; Rebs: C. Burr 14; Asts: 2 with 2

Orleans Arena
Paradise, NV
Attendance: 7,209
Referees: Cheryl Flores, Brian Woods, Benny Luna

=== Semifinals ===
==== #1 Gonzaga vs. #4 San Francisco ====
Broadcasters: Spencer Linton & Kristen Kozlowski
Series History: Series –

BYUtv

Mar 6
12:00 PM PST

#1 Gonzaga Bulldogs 77, #4 San Francisco Dons 46
Scoring by quarter: 22–4, 25–13, 21–15, 9–14
Pts: Kiara Kudron 15; Rebs: Kiara Kudron 7 Asts: Laura Stockton 6	Pts: Rachel Howard 20; Rebs: 4 with 5 Asts: Rahcel Howard 5

Orleans Arena
Paradise, NV
Attendance: 7,148
Referees: Cathi Cornell, Darren Krzesnik, Brian Woods

==== #2 BYU vs. #3 Saint Mary's ====
Broadcasters: Spencer Linton & Kristen Kozlowski
Series History: Series –

BYUtv

Mar 6
2:00 PM PST

#2 BYU Cougars 49, #3 Saint Mary's Gaels 59
Scoring by quarter: 9–14, 18–6, 12–21, 10–18
Pts: Mackenzie Pulsipher 16; Rebs: Kalani Purcell 9 Asts: 3 with 3	Pts: Shannon Mauldin 13; Rebs: Megan McKay 14; Asts: 2 with 4 Team Rebounds 50–25 over BYU

Orleans Arena
Paradise, NV
Attendance: 7,148
Referees: Penny Davis, Karen Lasuik, Bart Baldwin

=== WCC Championship ===
==== #1 Gonzaga vs. #3 Saint Mary's ====
Broadcasters: Paul Sunderland & Mike Thibault
Series History: Series –

ESPNU

Mar 7
1:00 PM PST

#1 Gonzaga Bulldogs vs. #3 Saint Mary's Gaels

Orleans Arena
Paradise, NV

== All-Tournament team ==
After the final, three Gonzaga and two Saint Mary's players were named to the All-Tournament team:

- Jill Barta – Gonzaga (Most Outstanding Player)
- Devyn Galland – Saint Mary's
- Kiara Kudron – Gonzaga
- Sydney Raggio – Saint Mary's
- Laura Stockton – Gonzaga

== See also ==
- 2016–17 NCAA Division I women's basketball season
- West Coast Conference men's basketball tournament
- 2017 West Coast Conference men's basketball tournament
- West Coast Conference women's basketball tournament
