= 2016–17 Loyola Marymount Lions women's basketball team =

Intercollegiate basketball season

2016–17 Loyola Marymount Lions women's basketball
- Conference: West Coast Conference
- Record: 14–16 (9–9 WCC)
- Head coach: Charity Elliott (5th season)
- Associate head coach: April Phillips (1st season)
- Assistant coaches: Chris Elliott; Bridgette Reyes
- Home arena: Gersten Pavilion

2016–17 West Coast Conference women's basketball standings
	Conf.				Overall
Team	W		L	PCT	W		L	PCT
Gonzaga†	14	–	4	.778	26	–	7	.788
BYU	13	–	5	.722	20	–	12	.625
Saint Mary's	13	–	5	.722	20	–	13	.606
San Francisco	11	–	7	.611	18	–	13	.581
Loyola Marymount	9	–	9	.500	14	–	16	.467
Santa Clara	9	–	9	.500	14	–	16	.467
San Diego	7	–	11	.389	14	–	16	.467
Pacific	5	–	13	.278	10	–	21	.323
Pepperdine	5	–	13	.278	7	–	23	.233
Portland	4	–	14	.222	6	–	24	.200
† 2017 WCC tournament winner As of March 18, 2017; Rankings from AP poll

The 2016–17 Loyola Marymount Lions women's basketball team represented Loyola Marymount University in the 2016–17 NCAA Division I women's basketball season. The Lions, led by fifth year head coach Charity Elliott, played their homes games at the Gersten Pavilion and were members of the West Coast Conference. They finished the season 14–16, 9–9 in WCC play to finish in a tie for fifth place. They lost in the quarterfinals of the WCC women's tournament to San Francisco.

== Roster ==
2016–17 Loyola Marymount Lions women's basketball team
Players
Coaches

Pos.	#	Name	Height	Year	Previous school	Hometown
G	1	Bianca Velasco	5 ft 8 in (1.73 m)	So	Mater Dei	Santa Ana, CA
G	2	Shelbi Aimonetti	5 ft 8 in (1.73 m)	Sr	St. Francis	Redwood City, CA
F	4	Cheyanne Wallace	6 ft 0 in (1.83 m)	So	Sierra Canyon	Woodland Hills, CA
G	11	Andee Velasco	5 ft 8 in (1.73 m)	So	Mater Dei	Santa Ana, CA
C	22	Raychel Stanley	6 ft 2 in (1.88 m)	Fr	Bishop Gorman	Las Vegas, NV
G	23	Leslie Lopez-Wood	5 ft 9 in (1.75 m)	Sr	Bishop Alemany	North Hollywood, CA
F	24	Bree Alford	6 ft 0 in (1.83 m)	Jr	Miramonte	Walnut Creek, CA
F	30	NK Ilang	6 ft 0 in (1.83 m)	RS So	St. Anne's-Belfield	Ebonyi State, Nigeria
G/F	31	Brittney Reed	5 ft 10 in (1.78 m)	Fr	Vista Murrieta	Murrieta, GA
G	32	Makenzie Cast	5 ft 9 in (1.75 m)	Jr	Carondelet	Antioch, CA
F	33	Gabby Green (I) (redshirt)	6 ft 2 in (1.88 m)	Jr	Saint Mary's; California	Oakland, CA
G	35	Cierra Belvin	5 ft 8 in (1.73 m)	Fr	Long Beach Poly	Long Beach, CA
F	43	Jackie Johnson	6 ft 2 in (1.88 m)	RS Sr	Eden Prairie HS; Minnesota	Eden Prairie, MN
C	44	Josie Buckingham (I) (redshirt)	6 ft 5 in (1.96 m)	Jr	New Richmond; Minnesota	New Richmond, OH

Head coach

- Charity Elliott (Missouri State)

Assistant coach(es)

- April Phillips (Xavier)
- Chris Elliott (Missouri State)
- Bridgette Reyes (Vanguard)

Legend

- (C) Team captain
- (S) Suspended
- (I) Ineligible
- (W) Walk-on
- Injured
- Current redshirt

Roster

== Schedule ==
Date time, TV	Rank^{#}	Opponent^{#}	Result	Record	Site (attendance) city, state
Exhibition
11/08/2016*; 7:00 pm		The Master's	W 98–73		Gersten Pavilion (180); Los Angeles, CA
Non-conference regular season
11/11/2016*; 7:00 pm		at Washington State	L 45–92	0–1	Beasley Coliseum (2,078); Pullman, WA
11/13/2016*; 2:00 pm, TheW.tv		Saint Louis	L 76–90	0–2	Gersten Pavilion (432); Los Angeles, CA
11/17/2016*; 5:00 pm		at Oklahoma State	L 58–66	0–3	Gallagher-Iba Arena (1,752); Stillwater, OK
11/20/2016*; 2:00 pm		at San Diego State	W 60–53	1–3	Viejas Arena (512); San Diego, CA
11/25/2016*; 2:30 pm, TheW.tv		UC Irvine; LMU Thanksgiving Classic	W 58–39	2–3	Gersten Pavilion (351); Los Angeles, CA
11/26/2016*; 3:30 pm, TheW.tv		Belmont; LMU Thanksgiving Classic	L 72–79	2–4	Gersten Pavilion (336); Los Angeles, CA
11/29/2016*; 7:00 pm		at Seattle	W 62–59	3–4	Connolly Center (133); Seattle, WA
12/02/2016*; 7:00 pm, TheW.tv		UC Santa Barbara	W 57–55	4–4	Gersten Pavilion (427); Los Angeles, CA
12/04/2016*; 4:00 pm		at Cal State Fullerton	W 77–62	5–4	Titan Gym (193); Fullerton, CA
12/10/2016*; 2:00 pm, TheW.tv		Long Beach State	L 78–81 ^{OT}	5–5	Gersten Pavilion (352); Los Angeles, CA
12/17/2016*; 1:00 pm, TheW.tv		UC Riverside	L 72–75	5–6	Gersten Pavilion (312); Los Angeles, CA
WCC regular season
12/29/2016; 6:30 pm		at Saint Mary's	L 59–74	5–7 (0–1)	McKeon Pavilion (484); Moraga, CA
12/31/2016; 1:00 pm, BYUtv		at BYU	L 59–76	5–8 (0–2)	Marriott Center (793); Provo, UT
01/05/2017; 7:00 pm, TheW.tv		Pepperdine	W 72–60	6–8 (1–2)	Gersten Pavilion (351); Los Angeles, CA
01/07/2017; 2:00 pm		at Santa Clara	L 64–71	6–9 (1–3)	Leavey Center (350); Santa Clara, CA
01/12/2017; 7:00 pm, TheW.tv		Gonzaga	L 56–80	6–10 (1–4)	Gersten Pavilion (263); Los Angeles, CA
01/14/2017; 2:00 pm, TheW.tv		Portland	W 69–54	7–10 (2–4)	Gersten Pavilion (325); Los Angeles, CA
01/19/2017; 6:00 pm		at San Diego	L 58–61	7–11 (2–5)	Jenny Craig Pavilion (318); San Diego, CA
01/21/2017; 2:00 pm, TheW.tv		Santa Clara	W 61–50	8–11 (3–5)	Gersten Pavilion (329); Los Angeles, CA
01/26/2017; 7:00 pm		at Pacific	W 65–52	9–11 (4–5)	Alex G. Spanos Center (397); Stockton, CA
01/28/2017; 2:00 pm, TheW.tv		BYU	W 77–72 ^{OT}	10–11 (5–5)	Gersten Pavilion (442); Los Angeles, CA
02/02/2017; 7:00 pm, TheW.tv		San Diego	W 63–55	11–11 (6–5)	Gersten Pavilion (443); Los Angeles, CA
02/04/2017; 2:00 pm, TheW.tv		San Francisco	L 72–79	11–12 (6–6)	Gersten Pavilion (321); Los Angeles, CA
02/09/2017; 6:00 pm		at Gonzaga	L 61–73	11–13 (6–7)	McCarthey Athletic Center (5,454); Spokane, WA
02/11/2017; 2:00 pm		at Portland	L 56–71	11–14 (6–8)	Chiles Center (313); Portland, OR
02/16/2017; 12:00 pm, TheW.tv		Saint Mary's	W 72–57	12–14 (7–8)	Gersten Pavilion (1,835); Los Angeles, CA
02/18/2017; 1:00 pm		at Pepperdine	W 87–78	13–14 (8–8)	Firestone Fieldhouse (218); Malibu, CA
02/23/2017; 7:00 pm		at San Francisco	L 73–89	13–15 (8–9)	War Memorial Gymnasium (335); San Francisco, CA
02/25/2017; 2:00 pm, TheW.tv		Pacific	W 75–64	14–15 (9–9)	Gersten Pavilion (518); Los Angeles, CA
WCC Women's Tournament
03/02/2017; 8:00 pm, BYUtv	(5)	vs. (4) San Francisco; Quarterfinals	L 67–80	14–16	Orleans Arena (7,089); Las Vegas, NV
*Non-conference game. ^{#}Rankings from AP Poll. (#) Tournament seedings in parentheses.

== See also ==
- 2016–17 Loyola Marymount Lions men's basketball team
