= 2016–17 Santa Clara Broncos women's basketball team =

Intercollegiate basketball season

2016–17 Santa Clara Broncos women's basketball
- Conference: West Coast Conference
- Record: 14–16 (9–9 WCC)
- Head coach: Bill Carr (1st season)
- Assistant coaches: Michael Floyd; Kristin Iwanaga; Taelor Karr
- Home arena: Leavey Center

2016–17 West Coast Conference women's basketball standings
	Conf.				Overall
Team	W		L	PCT	W		L	PCT
Gonzaga†	14	–	4	.778	26	–	7	.788
BYU	13	–	5	.722	20	–	12	.625
Saint Mary's	13	–	5	.722	20	–	13	.606
San Francisco	11	–	7	.611	18	–	13	.581
Loyola Marymount	9	–	9	.500	14	–	16	.467
Santa Clara	9	–	9	.500	14	–	16	.467
San Diego	7	–	11	.389	14	–	16	.467
Pacific	5	–	13	.278	10	–	21	.323
Pepperdine	5	–	13	.278	7	–	23	.233
Portland	4	–	14	.222	6	–	24	.200
† 2017 WCC tournament winner As of March 18, 2017; Rankings from AP poll

The 2016–17 Santa Clara Broncos women's basketball team represented Santa Clara University in the 2016–17 college basketball season. The Broncos, led by first year head coach Bill Carr. The Broncos were members of the West Coast Conference and play their home games at the Leavey Center. They finished the season 14–16, 9–9 in WCC play to finish in a tie for fifth place. They lost in the quarterfinals of the WCC women's tournament to Saint Mary's.

== Roster ==
2016–17 Santa Clara Broncos women's basketball team
Players
Coaches

Pos.	#	Name	Height	Year	Previous school	Hometown
F	2	Carly Patrick	6 ft 0 in (1.83 m)	Fr	John Paul College	Gold Coast, Australia
G	3	Taylor Berry	5 ft 11 in (1.8 m)	Jr	St. Mary's	Martinez, CA
G	4	Dru Toleafoa	6 ft 0 in (1.83 m)	So	Brigidine College Randwick	Sydney, Australia
F	5	Beth Carlson	6 ft 2 in (1.88 m)	RS Sr	Archbishop Murphy	Mill Creek, WA
G	10	Nicole Vander Helm	6 ft 0 in (1.83 m)	So	Holy Cross Regional	Surrey, BC
G	11	Ruobing Bai	5 ft 8 in (1.73 m)	Fr	Tsinghua	Henan, China
G	12	Kyla Martin	5 ft 5 in (1.65 m)	Jr	Etiwanda; East Los Angeles College	Chino, CA
F	15	Marie Bertholdt	6 ft 1 in (1.85 m)	Sr	Alameda	Alameda, CA
F	20	Lori Parkinson	6 ft 1 in (1.85 m)	RS Sr	Cyprus; Southern Utah	West Valley, UT
F	21	Naomi Jimenez	6 ft 0 in (1.83 m)	Fr	Westtown School	Albrightsville, PA
F	22	Ashlyn Herlihy	6 ft 1 in (1.85 m)	Fr	Arroyo Grande	Arroyo Grande, CA
G	24	Savanna Hanson	6 ft 0 in (1.83 m)	So	King's	Edmonds, WA
G	25	Emily Wolph	5 ft 5 in (1.65 m)	Jr	Desert Vista	Phoenix, AZ
F	30	Andraya Flor	6 ft 0 in (1.83 m)	So	Seattle Prep	Seattle, WA
F	32	Morgan McGwire	6 ft 2 in (1.88 m)	Jr	Reno	Reno, NV
F	33	Tamia Braggs	6 ft 2 in (1.88 m)	Fr	Lincoln	Tacoma, WA

Head coach

- Bill Carr (San Francisco)

Assistant coach(es)

- Michael Floyd (Murray State)
- Kristin Iwanaga (California)
- Taelor Karr (Gonzaga)

Legend

- (C) Team captain
- (S) Suspended
- (I) Ineligible
- (W) Walk-on
- Injured
- Current redshirt

Roster

== Schedule and results ==
Date time, TV	Rank^{#}	Opponent^{#}	Result	Record	Site (attendance) city, state
Exhibition
11/02/2016*; 7:00 pm		Notre Dame de Namur	W 84–54		Leavey Center (160); Santa Clara, CA
11/05/2016*; 5:00 pm		Chico State	W 83–68		Leavey Center; Santa Clara, CA
Non-conference regular season
11/11/2016*; 1:00 pm		Idaho State	W 82–78	1–0	Leavey Center (250); Santa Clara, CA
11/14/2016*; 7:00 pm		at California	L 58–73	1–1	Haas Pavilion (1,816); Berkeley, CA
11/20/2016*; 2:00 pm		at San Jose State	L 54–65	1–2	Event Center Arena (316); San Jose, CA
11/25/2016*; 4:00 pm		vs. Marquette; Tiger Turkey Tip-Off Thanksgiving Tournament	W 65–62	2–2	Alex G. Spanos Center; Stockton, CA
11/26/2016*; 1:00 pm		vs. Montana State; Tiger Turkey Tip-Off Thanksgiving Tournament	L 50–77	2–3	Alex G. Spanos Center; Stockton, CA
11/30/2016*; 7:00 pm		at UC Santa Barbara	W 69–58	3–3	The Thunderdome (609); Santa Barbara, CA
12/14/2016*; 7:00 pm		UC Santa Cruz; Play4Kay Shootout opening round	W 85–39	4–3	Leavey Center (390); Santa Clara, CA
12/17/2016*; 1:00 pm		Northwestern	L 75–87	4–4	Leavey Center (250); Santa Clara, CA
12/19/2016*; 5:30 pm		vs. Oklahoma State; Play4Kay Shootout quarterfinals	L 53–67	4–5	T-Mobile Arena; Paradise, NV
12/20/2016*; 12:30 pm		vs. No. 21 South Florida; Play 4 Kay Shootout consolation 2nd round	L 54–63	4–6	T-Mobile Arena; Paradise, NV
12/21/2016*; 12:30 pm		vs. New Mexico State; Play 4 Kay Shootout 7th place game	W 60–46	5–6	T-Mobile Arena; Paradise, NV
WCC regular season
12/29/2016; 6:00 pm		BYU	W 64–63	6–6 (1–0)	Leavey Center (443); Santa Clara, CA
12/31/2016; 2:00 pm		at San Francisco	L 68–77 ^{OT}	6–7 (1–1)	War Memorial Gymnasium (450); San Francisco, CA
01/05/2017; 7:00 pm		at Portland	W 56–44	7–7 (2–1)	Chiles Center (317); Portland, OR
01/07/2017; 2:00 pm		Loyola Marymount	W 71–64	8–7 (3–1)	Leavey Center (350); Santa Clara, CA
01/12/2017; 7:00 pm		San Diego	L 56–57	8–8 (3–2)	Leavey Center (200); Santa Clara, CA
01/14/2017; 2:00 pm		Pepperdine	W 61–40	9–8 (4–2)	Leavey Center (550); Santa Clara, CA
01/19/2017; 6:00 pm		at Gonzaga	L 39–51	9–9 (4–3)	McCarthey Athletic Center (5,760); Spokane, WA
01/21/2017; 2:00 pm		at Loyola Marymount	L 50–61	9–10 (4–4)	Gersten Pavilion (329); Los Angeles, CA
01/26/2017; 6:00 pm, BYUtv		at BYU	L 66–72 ^{OT}	9–11 (4–5)	Marriott Center (734); Provo, UT
01/28/2017; 1:00 pm		at Saint Mary's	L 53–55	9–12 (4–6)	McKeon Pavilion (239); Moraga, CA
02/02/2017; 7:00 pm		Portland	W 68–56	10–12 (5–6)	Leavey Center (250); Santa Clara, CA
02/04/2017; 2:00 pm		Gonzaga	L 49–50	10–13 (5–7)	Leavey Center (300); Santa Clara, CA
02/09/2017; 7:00 pm		San Francisco	W 74–61	11–13 (6–7)	Leavey Center (300); Santa Clara, CA
02/11/2017; 2:00 pm		Pacific	W 68–51	12–13 (7–7)	Leavey Center (400); Santa Clara, CA
02/16/2017; 7:00 pm		at Pepperdine	W 69–48	13–13 (8–7)	Firestone Fieldhouse (202); Malibu, CA
02/18/2017; 6:00 pm		at San Diego	L 58–60	13–14 (8–8)	Jenny Craig Pavilion (728); San Diego, CA
02/23/2017; 7:00 pm		at Pacific	W 61–51	14–14 (9–8)	Alex G. Spanos Center (595); Stockton, CA
02/25/2017; 2:00 pm		Saint Mary's	L 58–73	14–15 (9–9)	Leavey Center (400); Santa Clara, CA
WCC Women's Tournament
03/02/2017; 6:00 pm, BYUtv	(6)	vs. (3) Saint Mary's; Quarterfinals	L 57–60	14–16	Orleans Arena (7,089); Las Vegas, NV
*Non-conference game. ^{#}Rankings from AP Poll. (#) Tournament seedings in parentheses. All times are in Pacific Time.

== See also ==
- 2016–17 Santa Clara Broncos men's basketball team
