= Meghan Hays =

American communications executive

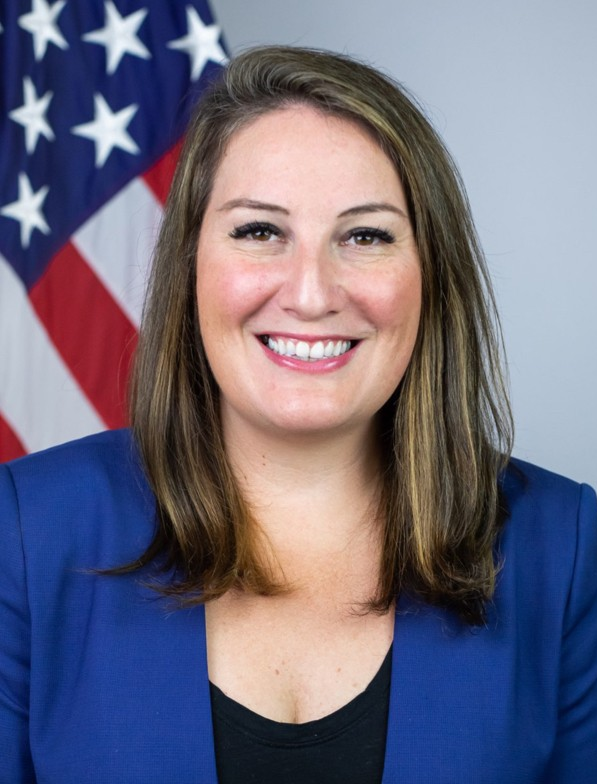
- Hays in 2022

Special Assistant to the President
- In office January 2021 – August 2022
- President: Joe Biden

Personal details
- Born: Auburn, California, U.S.
- Party: Democratic
- Education: University of California, Davis

Meghan Hays is an American communications executive who was a special assistant to the president and director of message planning in the White House from 2021 to 2022. As of 2024, she is a principal at West Shore Strategies.

== Life ==
Hays was born in Auburn, California and raised in Carmichael. She spent time at her family's seasonal home in Homewood near Lake Tahoe. Hayes attended St. Francis High School. She graduated from the University of California, Davis.

Hays is a communications executive. Hays worked in senior communications positions at MGM Resorts International. In 2012, she joined the communications team of the office of the vice president of the United States as an advance staffer. She progressed to the roles of deputy communications director and director of message planning in the office of the vice president. Hays served as a deputy communications director on the Joe Biden 2020 presidential campaign. Hays joined U.S. president Joe Biden's administration in 2021 and served as a special assistant to the president and director of message planning in the White House where she played a role in the president's strategic messaging for domestic and international engagements.

After leaving the administration in August 2022, she served as an advisory board member to SustainabiliD, a climate technology and sustainability firm. Hays previously served as chief of staff at American International Group (AIG). In June 2023, Hays was appointed by Biden as the U.S. presidential representative to the Tahoe Regional Planning Agency board.

In August 2024, Hays was introduced as a principal at West Shore Strategies.
