= 2016–17 Saint Mary's Gaels women's basketball team =

Intercollegiate basketball season

2016–17 Saint Mary's Gaels women's basketball

WNIT, First Round
- Conference: West Coast Conference
- Record: 20–13 (13–5 WCC)
- Head coach: Paul Thomas (11th season)
- Assistant coaches: Tracy Sanders; Allyson Fasnacht; Lisa O'Meara
- Home arena: McKeon Pavilion

2016–17 West Coast Conference women's basketball standings
	Conf.				Overall
Team	W		L	PCT	W		L	PCT
Gonzaga†	14	–	4	.778	26	–	7	.788
BYU	13	–	5	.722	20	–	12	.625
Saint Mary's	13	–	5	.722	20	–	13	.606
San Francisco	11	–	7	.611	18	–	13	.581
Loyola Marymount	9	–	9	.500	14	–	16	.467
Santa Clara	9	–	9	.500	14	–	16	.467
San Diego	7	–	11	.389	14	–	16	.467
Pacific	5	–	13	.278	10	–	21	.323
Pepperdine	5	–	13	.278	7	–	23	.233
Portland	4	–	14	.222	6	–	24	.200
† 2017 WCC tournament winner As of March 18, 2017; Rankings from AP poll

The 2016–17 Saint Mary's Gaels women's basketball team represented Saint Mary's College of California in the 2016–17 NCAA Division I women's basketball season. The Gales, led by eleventh year head coach Paul Thomas, played their home games at the McKeon Pavilion and were members of the West Coast Conference. They finished the season 20–13, 13–5 in WCC play to finish in a tie for second place. They advanced to the championship game of the WCC women's tournament where they lost to Gonzaga. They received an at-large bid to the WNIT where they lost to Colorado State in the first round.

== Roster ==
2016–17 Saint Mary's Gaels women's basketball team
Players
Coaches

Pos.	#	Name	Height	Year	Previous school	Hometown
G	3	Jasmine Forcadilla	5 ft 8 in (1.73 m)	Fr	St. Joseph's Catholic	Terrigal, Australia
G	4	Devyn Galland	5 ft 8 in (1.73 m)	RS Sr	Lewis & Clark; Oregon	Spokane, WA
F	5	Jordan Hobson	5 ft 10 in (1.78 m)	Fr	Salesian	Richmond, CA
G	10	Carly Turner	5 ft 11 in (1.8 m)	Jr	Australian Institute of Sport	Sydney, Australia
G	11	Morgan Malloy	5 ft 3 in (1.6 m)	Fr	Justin-Siena	Napa, CA
F	12	Sydney Raggio	6 ft 1 in (1.85 m)	So	St. Ignatius	San Bruno, CA
F	13	Tyra Moe	6 ft 1 in (1.85 m)	Fr	Punhou	Honolulu, HI
G	14	Shannon Mauldin	5 ft 9 in (1.75 m)	RS Sr	Saint Mary's	San Pablo, CA
G	20	Katie Rathbun	6 ft 0 in (1.83 m)	So	Carondelet	Concord, CA
G	21	Stella Beck	6 ft 0 in (1.83 m)	Jr	Hutt Valley	Lower Hutt, New Zealand
F	22	Devon Brookshire	6 ft 2 in (1.88 m)	RS Sr	Bishop Montgomery; Northwestern	Rancho Palos Verdes, CA
G	23	Alia McCoy	5 ft 11 in (1.8 m)	RS Sr	Canyon	Santa Clarita, CA
G	24	Samira McDonald	5 ft 9 in (1.75 m)	RS Sr	River Ridge	Lacey, WA
F	25	Megan McKay	6 ft 3 in (1.91 m)	So	St. Mary's Anglican	Katanning, Australia
F	30	Joy Akaegbu-Cleveland	6 ft 2 in (1.88 m)	Fr	Gonzaga Prep	Spokane, WA
C	33	Claire Ferguson	6 ft 3 in (1.91 m)	So	St. Thomas Aquinas; TCU	Olathe, KS

Head coach

- Paul Thomas (Wayne State College)

Assistant coach(es)

- Tracy Sanders (St. Mary's)
- Allyson Fasnacht (Liberty)
- Lisa O'Meara (St. Mary's)

Legend

- (C) Team captain
- (S) Suspended
- (I) Ineligible
- (W) Walk-on
- Injured
- Current redshirt

Roster

== Schedule and results ==
Date time, TV	Rank^{#}	Opponent^{#}	Result	Record	Site (attendance) city, state
Non-conference regular season
11/11/2016*; 5:30 pm, TheW.tv		California	L 67–74	0–1	McKeon Pavilion (1,248); Moraga, CA
11/13/2016*; 1:00 pm		at Washington State	L 69–85	0–2	Beasley Coliseum (439); Pullman, WA
11/15/2016*; 9:00 am		at Northeastern	W 77–53	1–2	Cabot Center (1,250); Boston, MA
11/20/2016*; 1:00 pm, ACC Extra		at Boston College	W 62–54	2–2	Conte Forum (559); Chestnut Hill, MA
11/25/2016*; 2:00 pm, TheW.tv		Boise State; Hilton Concord Thanksgiving Classic	L 78–83	2–3	McKeon Pavilion (271); Moraga, CA
11/26/2016*; 2:00 pm, TheW.tv		Utah; Hilton Concord Thanksgiving Classic	L 62–63	2–4	McKeon Pavilion (271); Moraga, CA
12/01/2016*; 5:00 pm		at Cal Poly	W 79–71	3–4	Mott Athletic Center (385); San Luis Obispo, CA
12/03/2016*; 4:30 pm, MW Net		at San Jose State	W 85–64	4–4	Event Center Arena (653); San Jose, CA
12/11/2016*; 2:00 pm		at UC Davis	L 66–68	4–5	The Pavilion (883); Davis, CA
12/16/2016*; 6:30 pm, TheW.tv		Northern Colorado	W 75–65	5–5	McKeon Pavilion (285); Moraga, CA
12/19/2016*; 6:30 pm, CHN		Cal State Northridge	L 61–73	5–6	McKeon Pavilion (142); Moraga, CA
WCC regular season
12/29/2016; 6:30 pm		Loyola Marymount	W 74–59	6–6 (1–0)	McKeon Pavilion (484); Moraga, CA
12/31/2016; 1:30 pm		at San Diego	L 71–73	6–7 (1–1)	Jenny Craig Pavilion (431); San Diego, CA
01/05/2017; 6:00 pm, BYUtv		at BYU	L 65–70	6–8 (1–2)	Marriott Center (390); Provo, UT
01/07/2017; 1:00 pm		San Francisco	W 75–72	7–8 (2–2)	McKeon Pavilion (224); Moraga, CA
01/12/2017; 6:30 pm		Portland	W 92–76	8–8 (3–2)	McKeon Pavilion (214); Moraga, CA
01/14/2017; 1:00 pm		Gonzaga	L 75–79	8–9 (3–3)	McKeon Pavilion (341); Moraga, CA
01/16/2017; 7:00 pm		at Pacific	W 63–54	9–9 (4–3)	Alex G. Spanos Center (398); Stockton, CA
01/21/2017; 1:00 pm		at Pepperdine	W 81–60	10–9 (5–3)	Firestone Fieldhouse (267); Malibu, CA
01/26/2017; 7:00 pm		at San Francisco	W 64–62	11–9 (6–3)	War Memorial Gymnasium (246); San Francisco, CA
01/28/2017; 1:00 pm		Santa Clara	W 55–53	12–9 (7–3)	McKeon Pavilion (239); Moraga, CA
02/02/2017; 6:30 pm		Pacific	W 82–74	13–9 (8–3)	McKeon Pavilion (184); Moraga, CA
02/04/2017; 1:00 pm		San Diego	W 77–65	14–9 (9–3)	McKeon Pavilion (214); Moraga, CA
02/09/2017; 7:00 pm		at Portland	W 75–65	15–9 (10–3)	Chiles Center (294); Portland, OR
02/11/2017; 2:00 pm		at Gonzaga	L 58–59	15–10 (10–4)	McCarthey Athletic Center (6,000); Spokane, WA
02/16/2017; 12:00 pm		at Loyola Marymount	L 57–72	15–11 (10–5)	Gersten Pavilion (1,835); Los Angeles, CA
02/18/2017; 1:00 pm		BYU	W 64–58	16–11 (11–5)	McKeon Pavilion (342); Moraga, CA
02/23/2017; 6:30 pm		Pepperdine	W 84–57	17–11 (12–5)	McKeon Pavilion (312); Moraga, CA
02/25/2017; 2:00 pm		at Santa Clara	W 73–58	18–11 (13–5)	Leavey Center (400); Santa Clara, CA
WCC Women's Tournament
03/02/2017; 6:00 pm, BYUtv	(3)	vs. (6) Santa Clara; Quarterfinals	W 60–57	19–11	Orleans Arena (7,089); Paradise, NV
03/06/2017; 2:00 pm, BYUtv	(3)	vs. (2) BYU; Semifinals	W 59–49	20–11	Orleans Arena (7,148); Paradise, NV
03/07/2017; 1:00 pm, ESPNU	(3)	vs. (1) Gonzaga; Championship Game	L 75–86	20–12	Orleans Arena (6,773); Paradise, NV
Women's National Invitation Tournament
03/16/2017*; 6:00 pm		at Colorado State; First Round	L 68–80 ^{OT}	20–13	Moby Arena (1,281); Fort Collins, CO
*Non-conference game. ^{#}Rankings from AP Poll. (#) Tournament seedings in parentheses. All times are in Pacific Time.

== See also ==
- 2016–17 Saint Mary's Gaels men's basketball team
