= 2016–17 Portland Pilots women's basketball team =

Intercollegiate basketball season

2016–17 Portland Pilots women's basketball
- Conference: West Coast Conference
- Record: 6–24 (4–14 WCC)
- Head coach: Cheryl Sorenson (3rd season)
- Assistant coaches: Steve Lowe; Brianna Chambers; Drew Muscatell
- Home arena: Chiles Center

2016–17 West Coast Conference women's basketball standings
	Conf.				Overall
Team	W		L	PCT	W		L	PCT
Gonzaga†	14	–	4	.778	26	–	7	.788
BYU	13	–	5	.722	20	–	12	.625
Saint Mary's	13	–	5	.722	20	–	13	.606
San Francisco	11	–	7	.611	18	–	13	.581
Loyola Marymount	9	–	9	.500	14	–	16	.467
Santa Clara	9	–	9	.500	14	–	16	.467
San Diego	7	–	11	.389	14	–	16	.467
Pacific	5	–	13	.278	10	–	21	.323
Pepperdine	5	–	13	.278	7	–	23	.233
Portland	4	–	14	.222	6	–	24	.200
† 2017 WCC tournament winner As of March 18, 2017; Rankings from AP poll

The 2016–17 Portland Pilots women's basketball team represented the University of Portland, United States, in the 2016–17 NCAA Division I women's basketball season. The Pilots, led by third year coach Cheryl Sorensen. They played their home games at Chiles Center and were members of the West Coast Conference. They finished the season 6–24, 4–14 in WCC play to finish in last place. They lost in the first round of the WCC women's tournament to Pacific.

== Roster ==
2016–17 Portland Pilots women's basketball team
Players
Coaches

Pos.	#	Name	Height	Year	Previous school	Hometown
G	1	Kate Anderson	5 ft 9 in (1.75 m)	Fr	Jesuit HS	Portland, OR
G	3	Kaylie Van Loo	5 ft 9 in (1.75 m)	Sr	Glencoe HS	Hillsboro, OR
G	10	Holly Blades	5 ft 11 in (1.8 m)	Sr	Meridian HS; College of Southern Idaho	Median, ID
F	11	Jojuan Carrington	6 ft 1 in (1.85 m)	RS So	Dublin HS; Diablo Valley College	Dublin, CA
G	14	Corissa Turley	6 ft 0 in (1.83 m)	Sr	Redwood HS; College of the Sequoias	Visalia, CA
G	15	Madison Ward	5 ft 10 in (1.78 m)	Jr	Mullen HS	Golden, CO
G	20	Hannah Mattson	5 ft 9 in (1.75 m)	Sr	West Valley HS	Fairbanks, AK
F	23	Julie Spencer	6 ft 2 in (1.88 m)	So	W.F. West HS	Chehalis, WA
G	24	Rachelle Owens	5 ft 7 in (1.7 m)	Sr	Carson HS; College of Southern Idaho	Carson, CA
F	30	Keala Quinlan	6 ft 0 in (1.83 m)	Fr	Roosevelt HS	Papakolea, HI
G	32	Darian Slaga	5 ft 8 in (1.73 m)	So	Boulder Creek HS	Prescott Valley, AZ
F	33	Ashley Gray	6 ft 1 in (1.85 m)	Jr	West Valley HS	Yakima, WA
C	35	Sara Zaragoza	6 ft 4 in (1.93 m)	Jr	Instituto Veritas	Madrid, Spain

Head coach

- Cheryl Sorenson (Washington)

Assistant coach(es)

- Steve Lowe (Central Washington)
- Brianna Chambers (Cal State Bakersfield)
- Drew Muscatell (Oregon)

Legend

- (C) Team captain
- (S) Suspended
- (I) Ineligible
- (W) Walk-on
- Injured
- Current redshirt

Roster

== Schedule and results ==
Date time, TV	Rank^{#}	Opponent^{#}	Result	Record	Site (attendance) city, state
Exhibition
11/01/2016*; 7:00 pm		Willamette	W 81–49		Chiles Center (204); Portland, OR
11/05/2016*; 5:00 pm		Warner Pacific	W 95–58		Chiles Center (254); Portland, OR
Non-conference regular season
11/11/2016*; 7:00 pm		at UC Davis	L 52–66	0–1	The Pavilion (597); Davis, CA
11/13/2016*; 2:00 pm		at Nevada	L 59–72	0–2	Lawlor Events Center (859); Reno, NV
11/18/2016*; 6:00 pm		at No. 24 Oregon State	L 45–62	0–3	Gill Coliseum (3,306); Corvallis, OR
11/22/2016*; 8:30 pm		at Alaska Anchorage; Great Alaska Shootout semifinals	W 66–57	1–3	Alaska Airlines Center (2,229); Fairbanks, AR
11/24/2016*; 5:30 pm		vs. USC; Great Alaska Shootout championship	L 54–67	1–4	Alaska Airlines Center (2,030); Fairbanks, AK
11/27/2016*; 2:00 pm		No. 15 Washington	L 53–83	1–5	Chiles Center (537); Portland, OR
11/30/2016*; 7:00 pm		Portland State	W 79–68	2–5	Chiles Center (209); Portland, OR
12/03/2016*; 1:00 pm		at Weber State	L 37–76	2–6	Dee Events Center (836); Ogden, UT
12/09/2016*; 6:00 pm		at Oregon	L 41–81	2–7	Matthew Knight Arena (2,316); Eugene, OR
12/11/2016*; 12:00 pm		Montana State	L 66–70	2–8	Chiles Center (318); Portland, OR
12/18/2016*; 1:00 pm		at Boise State	L 60–74	2–9	Taco Bell Arena; Boise, ID
WCC regular season
12/29/2016; 7:00 pm		Pacific	L 74–84	2–10 (0–1)	Chiles Center (293); Portland, OR
12/31/2016; 1:00 pm		at Pepperdine	W 71–61	3–10 (1–1)	Firestone Fieldhouse (217); Malibu, CA
01/05/2017; 7:00 pm		Santa Clara	L 44–56	3–11 (1–2)	Chiles Center (317); Portland, OR
01/07/2017; 2:00 pm		at Gonzaga	L 55–67	3–12 (1–3)	McCarthey Athletic Center (5,540); Spokane, WA
01/12/2017; 6:30 pm		at Saint Mary's	L 76–92	3–13 (1–4)	McKeon Pavilion (214); Moraga, CA
01/14/2017; 2:00 pm		at Loyola Marymount	L 54–69	3–14 (1–5)	Gersten Pavilion (325); Los Angeles, CA
01/19/2017; 7:00 pm, CSNNW		San Francisco	L 56–75	3–15 (1–6)	Chiles Center (217); Portland, OR
01/21/2017; 2:00 pm		Gonzaga	L 50–85	3–16 (1–7)	Chiles Center (493); Portland, OR
01/26/2017; 7:00 pm, CSNNW		Pepperdine	W 75–55	4–16 (2–7)	Chiles Center (213); Portland, OR
01/28/2017; 2:00 pm		at San Diego	L 40–57	4–17 (2–8)	Jenny Craig Pavilion (352); San Diego, CA
02/02/2017; 7:00 pm		at Santa Clara	L 56–68	4–18 (2–9)	Leavey Center (250); Santa Clara, CA
02/04/2017; 2:00 pm		BYU	L 38–77	4–19 (2–10)	Chiles Center (420); Portland, OR
02/09/2017; 7:00 pm		Saint Mary's	L 65–75	4–20 (2–11)	Chiles Center (294); Portland, OR
02/11/2017; 2:00 pm		Loyola Marymount	W 71–56	5–20 (3–11)	Chiles Center (313); Portland, OR
02/16/2017; 7:00 pm		at Pacific	W 78–71 ^{OT}	6–20 (4–11)	Alex G. Spanos Center (327); Stockton, CA
02/18/2017; 2:00 pm		at San Francisco	L 71–83	6–21 (4–12)	War Memorial Gymnasium (175); San Francisco, CA
02/23/2017; 6:00 pm, BYUtv		at BYU	L 60–73	6–22 (4–13)	Marriott Center (875); Provo, UT
02/25/2017; 2:00 pm		San Diego	L 54–72	6–23 (4–14)	Chiles Center (321); Portland, OR
WCC Women's Tournament
03/02/2017; 12:00 pm, BYUtv	(10)	vs. (7) Pacific; First Round	L 55–73	6–24	Orleans Arena; Las Vegas, NV
*Non-conference game. ^{#}Rankings from AP Poll. (#) Tournament seedings in parentheses. All times are in Pacific Time.

== See also ==
- 2016–17 Portland Pilots men's basketball team
