= 2016–17 San Francisco Dons women's basketball team =

Intercollegiate basketball season

2016–17 San Francisco Dons women's basketball
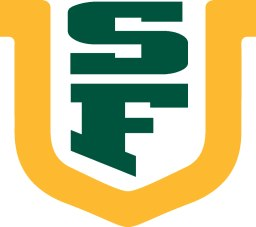
- Conference: West Coast Conference
- Record: 18–13 (11–7 WCC)
- Head coach: Molly Goodenbour (1st season)
- Assistant coaches: Linda Lappe; Janell Jones; Britinee Yasukochi
- Home arena: War Memorial Gymnasium

2016–17 West Coast Conference women's basketball standings
	Conf.				Overall
Team	W		L	PCT	W		L	PCT
Gonzaga†	14	–	4	.778	26	–	7	.788
BYU	13	–	5	.722	20	–	12	.625
Saint Mary's	13	–	5	.722	20	–	13	.606
San Francisco	11	–	7	.611	18	–	13	.581
Loyola Marymount	9	–	9	.500	14	–	16	.467
Santa Clara	9	–	9	.500	14	–	16	.467
San Diego	7	–	11	.389	14	–	16	.467
Pacific	5	–	13	.278	10	–	21	.323
Pepperdine	5	–	13	.278	7	–	23	.233
Portland	4	–	14	.222	6	–	24	.200
† 2017 WCC tournament winner As of March 18, 2017; Rankings from AP poll

The 2016–17 San Francisco Dons women's basketball team represented the University of San Francisco in the 2016–17 NCAA Division I women's basketball season. It was head coach Molly Goodenbour's first season at San Francisco. The Dons, members of the West Coast Conference, played their home games at War Memorial Gymnasium. They finished the season 18–13, 11–7 in WCC play to finish in fourth place. They advanced to the semifinals of the WCC women's tournament, where they lost to Gonzaga.

== Roster ==
2016–17 San Francisco Dons women's basketball team
Players
Coaches

Pos.	#	Name	Height	Year	Previous school	Hometown
G	1	Anna Pierce	5 ft 6 in (1.68 m)	Fr	Parish Episcopal	Plano, TX
F	2	Dagny McConnell	6 ft 3 in (1.91 m)	So	Beaverton	Beaverton, OR
G	3	Raushan Gultekin	5 ft 7 in (1.7 m)	Sr	Salt Lake CC	Lund, Sweden
G	11	Rachel Howard	5 ft 10 in (1.78 m)	Sr	Berkeley	Berkeley, CA
G	12	Jaylin Jones	5 ft 11 in (1.8 m)	So	El Dorado	Placentia, CA
G	13	Nia Alexander	5 ft 9 in (1.75 m)	Fr	Todd Beamer	Federal Way, WA
F	14	Michaela Rakova	6 ft 3 in (1.91 m)	Jr	Gymnazium Hubeneho	Ivanka pri Dunaji, Slovakia
F	20	Cierra Roufosse	6 ft 3 in (1.91 m)	RS Fr	W. J. Mouat	Abbotsford, BC
G	21	Anna Seilund	5 ft 9 in (1.75 m)	Jr	Falkonergaarden	Copenhagen, Denmark
F	22	Claudia Price	5 ft 11 in (1.8 m)	Sr	West Mesquite	Mesquite, TX
F	23	Alicia Roufosse	6 ft 3 in (1.91 m)	So	W. J. Mouat	Abbotsford, BC
C	25	Zayn Dornstauder	6 ft 4 in (1.93 m)	So	Hamilton	Regina, SK
G	35	Kalyn Simon	5 ft 9 in (1.75 m)	RS Jr	Archbishop Mitty	San Jose, CA
G	43	Ninni Salmi	6 ft 2 in (1.88 m)	RS Fr	Mäkelänrinne	Kauhajoki, Finland
F	44	Hashima Carothers	5 ft 11 in (1.8 m)	Sr	Eastside College Prep	Las Vegas, NV

Head coach

- Molly Goodenbour (Stanford)

Assistant coach(es)

- Linda Lappe (Colorado)
- Janell Jones (Oklahoma Christian)
- Britinee Yasukochi (Occidental)

Legend

- (C) Team captain
- (S) Suspended
- (I) Ineligible
- (W) Walk-on
- Injured
- Current redshirt

Roster

== Schedule and results ==
Date time, TV	Rank^{#}	Opponent^{#}	Result	Record	Site (attendance) city, state
Exhibition
11/04/2016*; 7:00 pm		Cal State Monterey Bay	W 99–65		War Memorial Gymnasium (250); San Francisco, CA
Non-conference regular season
11/11/2016*; 6:00 pm		Sacramento State	W 91–80	1–0	War Memorial Gymnasium (612); San Francisco, CA
11/15/2016*; 7:00 pm		Seattle	W 73–59	2–0	War Memorial Gymnasium (182); San Francisco, CA
11/18/2016*; 7:00 pm		at Washington State	L 35–73	2–1	Beasley Coliseum (419); Pullman, WA
11/20/2016*; 2:00 pm		Long Beach State	W 73–71	3–1	War Memorial Gymnasium (322); San Francisco, CA
11/25/2016*; 1:00 pm		at California; Cal Classic semifinals	L 52–75	3–2	Haas Pavilion (2,637); Berkeley, CA
11/26/2016*; 1:00 pm		vs. Western Carolina; Cal Classic 3rd place game	W 73–52	4–2	Haas Pavilion; Berkeley, CA
11/30/2016*; 7:00 pm		at Fresno State	L 48–61	4–3	Save Mart Center (5,147); Fresno, CA
12/03/2016*; 12:00 pm		at North Dakota	L 63–71	4–4	Betty Engelstad Sioux Center (1,447); Grand Forks, ND
12/06/2016*; 6:00 pm		San Jose State	W 79–71	5–4	Kezar Pavilion (541); San Francisco, CA
12/17/2016*; 4:00 pm		at Cal Poly	W 73–67	6–4	Mott Athletic Center (406); San Luis Obispo, CA
12/21/2016*; 1:00 pm		UC Davis	L 58–78	6–5	War Memorial Gymnasium (375); San Francisco, CA
WCC regular season
12/29/2016; 6:00 pm		at San Diego	W 82–67	7–5 (1–0)	Jenny Craig Pavilion (281); San Diego, CA
12/31/2016; 2:00 pm		Santa Clara	W 77–68 ^{OT}	8–5 (2–0)	War Memorial Gymnasium (450); San Francisco, CA
01/05/2017; 6:00 pm		at Gonzaga	L 46–61	8–6 (2–1)	McCarthey Athletic Center (5,184); Spokane, WA
01/07/2017; 1:00 pm		at Saint Mary's	L 72–75	8–7 (2–2)	McKeon Pavilion (224); Moraga, CA
01/12/2017; 7:00 pm		BYU	W 70–63	9–7 (3–2)	War Memorial Gymnasium (126); San Francisco, CA
01/14/2017; 2:00 pm		at Pacific	L 60–63	9–8 (3–3)	Alex G. Spanos Center (369); Stockton, CA
01/19/2017; 7:00 pm		at Portland	W 75–56	10–8 (4–3)	Chiles Center (217); Portland, OR
01/21/2017; 2:00 pm		San Diego	W 81–72	11–8 (5–3)	War Memorial Gymnasium (126); San Francisco, CA
01/26/2017; 7:00 pm		Saint Mary's	L 62–64	11–9 (5–4)	War Memorial Gymnasium (246); San Francisco, CA
01/28/2017; 2:00 pm		Pacific	W 67–64	12–9 (6–4)	War Memorial Gymnasium (231); San Francisco, CA
02/02/2017; 7:00 pm		at Pepperdine	L 59–81	12–10 (6–5)	Firestone Fieldhouse (242); Malibu, CA
02/04/2017; 2:00 pm		at Loyola Marymount	W 79–72	13–10 (7–5)	Gersten Pavilion (321); Los Angeles, CA
02/09/2017; 7:00 pm		at Santa Clara	L 61–74	13–11 (7–6)	Leavey Center (300); Santa Clara, CA
02/11/2017; 1:00 pm, BYUtv		at BYU	L 61–73	13–12 (7–7)	Marriott Center (879); Provo, UT
02/16/2017; 7:00 pm		Gonzaga	W 77–72	14–12 (8–7)	War Memorial Gymnasium (173); San Francisco, CA
02/18/2017; 2:00 pm		Portland	W 83–71	15–12 (9–7)	War Memorial Gymnasium (175); San Francisco, CA
02/23/2017; 7:00 pm		Loyola Marymount	W 89–73	16–12 (10–7)	War Memorial Gymnasium (335); San Francisco, CA
02/25/2017; 2:00 pm		Pepperdine	W 84–78	17–12 (11–7)	War Memorial Gymnasium (410); San Francisco, CA
WCC Women's Tournament
03/02/2017; 8:00 pm, BYUtv	(4)	vs. (5) Loyola Marymount; Quarterfinals	W 80–67	18–12	Orleans Arena (7,089); Las Vegas, NV
03/06/2017; 12:00 pm, BYUtv	(4)	vs. (1) Gonzaga; Semifinals	L 46–77	18–13	Orleans Arena; Las Vegas, NV
*Non-conference game. ^{#}Rankings from AP Poll. (#) Tournament seedings in parentheses. All times are in Pacific Time.

== See also ==
- 2016–17 San Francisco Dons men's basketball team
