= 2016–17 Gonzaga Bulldogs women's basketball team =

Intercollegiate basketball season

2016–17 Gonzaga Bulldogs women's basketball

WCC Regular Season and Tournament Champions

NCAA Women's tournament, first round
- Conference: West Coast Conference
- Record: 26–7 (14–4 WCC)
- Head coach: Lisa Fortier (3rd season)
- Assistant coaches: Jordan Green; Stacy Clinesmith; Craig Fortier
- Home arena: McCarthey Athletic Center

2016–17 West Coast Conference women's basketball standings
	Conf.				Overall
Team	W		L	PCT	W		L	PCT
Gonzaga†	14	–	4	.778	26	–	7	.788
BYU	13	–	5	.722	20	–	12	.625
Saint Mary's	13	–	5	.722	20	–	13	.606
San Francisco	11	–	7	.611	18	–	13	.581
Loyola Marymount	9	–	9	.500	14	–	16	.467
Santa Clara	9	–	9	.500	14	–	16	.467
San Diego	7	–	11	.389	14	–	16	.467
Pacific	5	–	13	.278	10	–	21	.323
Pepperdine	5	–	13	.278	7	–	23	.233
Portland	4	–	14	.222	6	–	24	.200
† 2017 WCC tournament winner As of March 18, 2017; Rankings from AP poll

The 2016–17 Gonzaga Bulldogs women's basketball team represented Gonzaga University in the 2016–17 NCAA Division I women's basketball season. The Bulldogs (also informally referred to as the "Zags"), members of the West Coast Conference. The Bulldogs, led by third year head coach Lisa Fortier, the Zags played their home games at the McCarthey Athletic Center on the university campus in Spokane, Washington. They finished the season 26–7, 14–4 in WCC play to win the WCC regular season. They defeated Pacific, San Francisco and Saint Mary's to become champions of the WCC women's basketball tournament to earn an automatic trip to the NCAA women's tournament, where they were defeated by Oklahoma in the first round.

== Roster ==
2016–17 Gonzaga Bulldogs women's basketball team
Players
Coaches

Pos.	#	Name	Height	Year	Previous school	Hometown
F	00	Zykera Rice	6 ft 1 in (1.85 m)	So	Clover Park	Lakewood, WA
G	4	Makenlee Williams	5 ft 11 in (1.8 m)	RS Sr	Syracuse; Utah State	Syracuse, UT
G	10	Zhane Templeton	5 ft 11 in (1.8 m)	So	South Grand Prairie	Grand Prairie, TX
G	11	Laura Stockton	5 ft 8 in (1.73 m)	So	Gonzaga Prep	Spokane, WA
C	12	Emma Wolfram	6 ft 5 in (1.96 m)	RS Jr	South Kamloops	Kamloops, BC
F	13	Jill Barta	6 ft 3 in (1.91 m)	RS So	Fairfield	Fairfield, MT
G	14	Emma Stach	5 ft 9 in (1.75 m)	Jr	Avides Hurricanes	Buchholz, Germany
G	15	Jessie Loera	5 ft 6 in (1.68 m)	Fr	Moses Lake	Moses Lake, WA
G	22	Corryn Douglas	6 ft 0 in (1.83 m)	Fr	Newbury Park	Newbury Park, CA
F	23	Kiara Kudron	6 ft 2 in (1.88 m)	RS Sr	Huron High School	New Boston, MI
G	30	Chandler Smith	6 ft 0 in (1.83 m)	RS So	Brewster; Nebraska	Brewster, WA
G	31	Elle Tinkle	6 ft 2 in (1.88 m)	RS Sr	Big Sky	Missoula, MT
F	33	Grace Collet	6 ft 4 in (1.93 m)	Fr	Box Hill Senior Secondary	Greensborough, Australia

Head coach

- Lisa Fortier (Cal State Monterey)

Assistant coach(es)

- Jordan Green (George Fox)
- Stacy Clinesmith (UC Santa Barbara)
- Craig Fortier (Cal State Monterey)

Legend

- (C) Team captain
- (S) Suspended
- (I) Ineligible
- (W) Walk-on
- Injured
- Current redshirt

Roster

== Schedule ==
Date time, TV	Rank^{#}	Opponent^{#}	Result	Record	Site (attendance) city, state
Exhibition
11/04/2016*; 6:00 pm		Corban	W 86–31		McCarthey Athletic Center (5,006); Spokane, WA
Non-conference regular season
11/12/2016*; 2:00 pm		Nicholls State	W 78–46	1–0	McCarthey Athletic Center (5,212); Spokane, WA
11/13/2016*; 2:00 pm		UC Irvine	W 102–38	2–0	McCarthey Athletic Center (5,186); Spokane, WA
11/18/2016*; 7:00 pm, P12N		at No. 11 Stanford	W 68–63	3–0	Maples Pavilion (2,654); Stanford, CA
11/24/2016*; 5:00 pm	No. 25	vs. Michigan; Paradise Jam tournament Reef Division	L 66–78	3–1	Sports and Fitness Center (1,734); Saint Thomas, USVI
11/25/2016*; 2:45 pm	No. 25	vs. No. 10 Florida State; Paradise Jam Tournament Reef Division	L 69–87	3–2	Sports and Fitness Center; Saint Thomas, USVI
11/26/2016*; 2:45 pm	No. 25	vs. Winthrop; Paradise Jam Tournament Reef Division	W 71–41	4–2	Sports and Fitness Center (1,010); Saint Thomas, USVI
12/03/2016*; 2:00 pm		Presbyterian	W 79–39	5–2	McCarthey Athletic Center (5,037); Spokane, WA
12/08/2016*; 6:00 pm, SWX		Washington State	W 79–61	6–2	McCarthey Athletic Center (5,724); Spokane, WA
12/11/2016*; 2:00 pm		at Eastern Washington	W 73–54	7–2	Reese Court (1,438); Cheney, WA
12/19/2016*; 6:00 pm, SWX		Northwestern	W 67–56	8–2	McCarthey Athletic Center (5,638); Spokane, WA
12/22/2016*; 2:00 pm		Colgate	W 72–42	9–2	McCarthey Athletic Center (5,719); Spokane, WA
WCC regular season
12/29/2016; 7:00 pm		at Pepperdine	L 69–79	9–3 (0–1)	Firestone Fieldhouse (337); Malibu, CA
12/31/2016; 2:00 pm		Pacific	L 63–65	9–4 (0–2)	McCarthey Athletic Center (5,812); Spokane, WA
01/05/2017; 6:00 pm, SWX		San Francisco	W 61–46	10–4 (1–2)	McCarthey Athletic Center (5,184); Spokane, WA
01/07/2017; 2:00 pm		Portland	W 67–55	11–4 (2–2)	McCarthey Athletic Center (5,540); Spokane, WA
01/12/2017; 7:00 pm		at Loyola Marymount	W 80–56	12–4 (3–2)	Gersten Pavilion (263); Los Angeles, CA
01/14/2017; 1:00 pm		at Saint Mary's	W 79–75	13–4 (4–2)	McKeon Pavilion (341); Moraga, CA
01/19/2016; 6:00 pm, SWX		Santa Clara	W 51–39	14–4 (5–2)	McCarthey Athletic Center (5,760); Spokane, WA
01/21/2017; 2:00 pm		at Portland	W 85–50	15–4 (6–2)	Chiles Center (493); Portland, OR
01/26/2017; 6:00 pm		at San Diego	W 57–55	16–4 (7–2)	Jenny Craig Pavilion (459); San Diego, CA
01/28/2017; 2:00 pm		Pepperdine	W 83–61	17–4 (8–2)	McCarthey Athletic Center (6,000); Spokane, WA
02/02/2017; 6:00 pm		BYU	W 87–52	18–4 (9–2)	McCarthey Athletic Center (6,000); Spokane, WA
02/04/2017; 2:00 pm		at Santa Clara	W 50–49	19–4 (10–2)	Leavey Center (300); Santa Clara, CA
02/09/2017; 6:00 pm		Loyola Marymount	W 73–61	20–4 (11–2)	McCarthey Athletic Center (5,454); Spokane, WA
02/11/2017; 2:00 pm, SWX		Saint Mary's	W 59–58	21–4 (12–2)	McCarthey Athletic Center (6,000); Spokane, WA
02/16/2017; 7:00 pm		at San Francisco	L 72–77	21–5 (12–3)	War Memorial Gymnasium (173); San Francisco, CA
02/18/2017; 2:00 pm		at Pacific	W 74–58	22–5 (13–3)	Alex G. Spanos Center (514); Stockton, CA
02/23/2017; 6:00 pm		San Diego	W 62–57	23–5 (14–3)	McCarthey Athletic Center (6,000); Spokane, WA
02/25/2017; 1:00 pm, BYUtv		at BYU	L 63–71	23–6 (14–4)	Marriott Center (2,195); Provo, UT
WCC Women's tournament
03/03/2017; 12:00 pm, BYUtv	(1)	vs. (8) Pacific; Quarterfinals	W 91–59	24–6	Orleans Arena; Paradise, NV
03/06/2017; 12:00 pm, BYUtv	(1)	vs. (4) San Francisco; Semifinals	W 77–46	25–6	Orleans Arena; Paradise, NV
03/07/2017; 1:00 pm, ESPNU	(1)	vs. (3) Saint Mary's; Championship Game	W 86–75	26–6	Orleans Arena (6,773); Paradise, NV
NCAA Women's tournament
03/18/2017*; 3:30 pm, ESPN2	(11 O)	vs. (6 O) No. 23 Oklahoma; First Round	L 62–82	26–7	Alaska Airlines Arena (10,000); Seattle, WA
*Non-conference game. ^{#}Rankings from AP Poll. (#) Tournament seedings in parentheses. O=Oklahoma Region. All times are in Pacific Time.

== Rankings ==
2016–17 NCAA Division I women's basketball rankings

Regular season polls
Poll	Pre- Season	Week 2	Week 3	Week 4	Week 5	Week 6	Week 7	Week 8	Week 9	Week 10	Week 11	Week 12	Week 13	Week 14	Week 15	Week 16	Week 17	Week 18	Week 19	Final
AP	NR	NR	25	RV	RV	RV	RV	RV	NR	NR	NR	NR	NR	RV	RV	NR	NR	NR	NR	N/A
Coaches	RV	RV	RV	RV	RV	RV	RV	RV	NR	NR	NR	NR	NR	NR	NR	NR	NR	RV	RV	NR

Legend
	Increase in ranking
	Decrease in ranking
	Not ranked previous week
(RV)	Received Votes

== See also ==
- 2016–17 Gonzaga Bulldogs men's basketball team
