= 2016–17 San Diego Toreros women's basketball team =

Intercollegiate basketball season

2016–17 San Diego Toreros women's basketball
- Conference: West Coast Conference
- Record: 14–16 (7–11 WCC)
- Head coach: Cindy Fisher (12th season)
- Assistant coaches: Mary Ann Falcosky; Mery Andrade; Trevor Olson
- Home arena: Jenny Craig Pavilion

2016–17 West Coast Conference women's basketball standings
	Conf.				Overall
Team	W		L	PCT	W		L	PCT
Gonzaga†	14	–	4	.778	26	–	7	.788
BYU	13	–	5	.722	20	–	12	.625
Saint Mary's	13	–	5	.722	20	–	13	.606
San Francisco	11	–	7	.611	18	–	13	.581
Loyola Marymount	9	–	9	.500	14	–	16	.467
Santa Clara	9	–	9	.500	14	–	16	.467
San Diego	7	–	11	.389	14	–	16	.467
Pacific	5	–	13	.278	10	–	21	.323
Pepperdine	5	–	13	.278	7	–	23	.233
Portland	4	–	14	.222	6	–	24	.200
† 2017 WCC tournament winner As of March 18, 2017; Rankings from AP poll

The 2016–17 San Diego Toreros women's basketball team represented the University of San Diego in the 2016–17 NCAA Division I women's basketball season. The Toreros, members of the West Coast Conference (WCC), were led by 12th-year head coach Cindy Fisher. The Toreros played their home games at the Jenny Craig Pavilion on the university campus in San Diego, California. They finished the season 14–16, 7–11 in WCC play, to finish in seventh place. They advanced to the quarterfinals of the WCC women's tournament, where they lost to BYU.

== Roster ==
2016–17 San Diego Toreros women's basketball team
Players
Coaches

Pos.	#	Name	Height	Year	Previous school	Hometown
F	2	Tayla Hepburn	6 ft 2 in (1.88 m)	So	St. Mary's Anglican	Perth, Australia
G	4	Ana Ramos	5 ft 10 in (1.78 m)	Fr	None	Porto, Portugal
G	5	Aubrey Ward-El	5 ft 9 in (1.75 m)	Jr	Skyview	Vancouver, WA
G	11	Madison Pollock	6 ft 1 in (1.85 m)	Fr	Archbishop Murphy	Snohomish, WA
F	12	Alexandra Hagan	6 ft 0 in (1.83 m)	So	Inglemoor	Kenmore, WA
G	21	Sydney Shepard	5 ft 11 in (1.8 m)	So	Lake Washington	Kirkland, WA
F	22	Maya Hood	5 ft 10 in (1.78 m)	RS Sr	La Jolla Country Day	San Diego, CA
F	24	Caroline Buhr	6 ft 1 in (1.85 m)	RS So	Penn	Mishawaka, IN
G	25	Katherine Hamilton	5 ft 8 in (1.73 m)	Sr	Dobson	Chandler, AZ
G	32	Cori Woodward	5 ft 6 in (1.68 m)	Sr	Prairie	Vancouver, WA
F	34	Patricia Brossman	6 ft 0 in (1.83 m)	Fr	None	Berlin, Germany
G	40	Jamie Kissinger	5 ft 9 in (1.75 m)	Jr	Minden	Minden, NE
F	44	Sydney Williams	6 ft 1 in (1.85 m)	Jr	Coeur d'Alene	Coeur d'Alene, ID
F	55	Alexandria Young	6 ft 0 in (1.83 m)	RS Jr	Mater Dei	San Diego, CA
F		Edi Utibe	6 ft 2 in (1.88 m)	RS Jr	Charlotte Amalie	U.S. Virgin Islands

Head coach

- Cindy Fisher (Eastern Wyoming College)

Assistant coach(es)

- Mary Ann Falcosky (Northern Arizona)
- Mery Andrade (Old Dominion)
- Trevor Olson (San Diego)

Legend

- (C) Team captain
- (S) Suspended
- (I) Ineligible
- (W) Walk-on
- Injured
- Current redshirt

Roster
Last update: April 1, 2025

== Schedule ==
Date time, TV	Rank^{#}	Opponent^{#}	Result	Record	Site (attendance) city, state
Exhibition
November 8, 2016*; 6:00 p.m.		Point Loma Nazarene	W 84–69		Jenny Craig Pavilion; San Diego, CA
Non-conference regular season
November 11, 2016*; 6:00 p.m.		Cal State Fullerton	W 103–50	1–0	Jenny Craig Pavilion (321); San Diego, CA
November 14, 2016*; 7:00 p.m.		at Cal State Northridge	W 76–67	2–0	Matadome (474); Northridge, CA
November 17, 2016*; 6:00 p.m.		San Diego State	W 91–53	3–0	Jenny Craig Pavilion (482); San Diego, CA
November 20, 2016*; 1:00 p.m.		at Northern Colorado	L 51–54	3–1	Bank of Colorado Arena (502); Greeley, CO
November 25, 2016*; 5:00 p.m.		UC Santa Barbara	W 77–63	4–1	Jenny Craig Pavilion (503); San Diego, CA
December 2, 2016*; 7:00 p.m.		at Washington State	L 73–83	4–2	Beasley Coliseum (562); Pullman, WA
December 7, 2016*; 6:00 p.m.		at Arizona	L 59–76	4–3	McKeon Pavilion (1,091); Tucson, AZ
December 10, 2016*; 2:00 p.m.		Nevada	W 70–54	5–3	Jenny Craig Pavilion (403); San Diego, CA
December 12, 2016*; 6:00 p.m.		Seattle	W 67–44	6–3	Jenny Craig Pavilion (328); San Diego, CA
December 21, 2016*; 5:00 p.m.		North Dakota	L 61–65	6–4	Jenny Craig Pavilion (277); San Diego, CA
WCC regular season
December 29, 2016; 6:00 p.m.		San Francisco	L 67–82	6–5 (0–1)	Jenny Craig Pavilion (281); San Diego, CA
December 31, 2016; 1:30 p.m.		Saint Mary's	W 73–71	7–5 (1–1)	Jenny Craig Pavilion (431); San Diego, CA
January 5, 2017; 7:00 p.m.		at Pacific	L 64–84	7–6 (1–2)	Alex G. Spanos Center (414); Stockton, CA
January 7, 2017; 2:00 p.m.		Pepperdine	L 42–55	7–7 (1–3)	Jenny Craig Pavilion (407); San Diego, CA
January 12, 2017; 7:00 p.m.		at Santa Clara	W 57–56	8–7 (2–3)	Leavey Center (200); Santa Clara, CA
January 14, 2017; 11:00 a.m., BYUtv		at BYU	L 63–81	8–8 (2–4)	Marriott Center (676); Provo, UT
January 19, 2017; 6:00 p.m.		Loyola Marymount	W 61–58	9–8 (3–4)	Jenny Craig Pavilion (318); San Diego, CA
January 21, 2017; 2:00 p.m.		at San Francisco	L 72–81	9–9 (3–5)	War Memorial Gymnasium (126); San Francisco, CA
January 26, 2017; 6:00 p.m.		Gonzaga	L 55–57	9–10 (3–6)	Jenny Craig Pavilion (459); San Diego, CA
January 28, 2017; 2:00 p.m.		Portland	W 57–40	10–10 (4–6)	Jenny Craig Pavilion (352); San Diego, CA
February 2, 2017; 7:00 p.m.		at Loyola Marymount	L 55–63	10–11 (4–7)	Gersten Pavilion (443); Los Angeles, CA
February 4, 2017; 1:00 p.m.		at Saint Mary's	L 65–77	10–12 (4–8)	McKeon Pavilion (214); Moraga, CA
February 9, 2017; 6:00 p.m.		Pacific	W 73–71	11–12 (5–8)	Jenny Craig Pavilion (288); San Diego, CA
February 11, 2017; 1:00 p.m.		at Pepperdine	L 40–57	11–13 (5–9)	Firestone Fieldhouse (197); Malibu, CA
February 16, 2017; 6:00 p.m.		BYU	L 47–65	11–14 (5–10)	Jenny Craig Pavilion (432); San Diego, CA
February 18, 2017; 2:00 p.m.		Santa Clara	W 60–58	12–14 (6–10)	Jenny Craig Pavilion (728); San Diego, CA
February 23, 2017; 6:00 p.m.		at Gonzaga	L 57–62	12–15 (6–11)	McCarthey Athletic Center (6,000); Spokane, WA
February 25, 2017; 2:00 p.m.		at Portland	W 72–54	13–15 (7–11)	Chiles Center (321); Portland, OR
WCC women's tournament
March 2, 2017; 2:00 p.m., BYUtv	(7)	vs. (10) Portland; First round	W 74–47	14–15	Orleans Arena (7,089); Paradise, NV
March 3, 2017; 2:00 p.m., BYUtv	(7)	vs. (2) BYU; Quarterfinals	L 66–75 ^{OT}	14–16	Orleans Arena (7,209); Paradise, NV
*Non-conference game. ^{#}Rankings from AP poll. (#) Tournament seedings in parentheses. All times are in Pacific.

== Rankings ==
Regular-season polls
Poll	Pre- season	Week 2	Week 3	Week 4	Week 5	Week 6	Week 7	Week 8	Week 9	Week 10	Week 11	Week 12	Week 13	Week 14	Week 15	Week 16	Week 17	Week 18	Week 19	Final
AP																				N/A
Coaches																				

Legend
	Increase in ranking
	Decrease in ranking
	Not ranked previous week
(RV)	Received votes
