= 2016–17 BYU Cougars women's basketball team =

Intercollegiate basketball season

2016–17 BYU Cougars women's basketball

UNM Thanksgiving Tournament Champions

WNIT, First Round
- Conference: West Coast Conference
- Record: 20–12 (13–5 WCC)
- Head coach: Jeff Judkins (16th season)
- Assistant coaches: Melinda Bendall (6th season); Ray Stewart (6th season); Dan Nielson (4th season)
- Home arena: Marriott Center

2016–17 West Coast Conference women's basketball standings
	Conf.				Overall
Team	W		L	PCT	W		L	PCT
Gonzaga†	14	–	4	.778	26	–	7	.788
BYU	13	–	5	.722	20	–	12	.625
Saint Mary's	13	–	5	.722	20	–	13	.606
San Francisco	11	–	7	.611	18	–	13	.581
Loyola Marymount	9	–	9	.500	14	–	16	.467
Santa Clara	9	–	9	.500	14	–	16	.467
San Diego	7	–	11	.389	14	–	16	.467
Pacific	5	–	13	.278	10	–	21	.323
Pepperdine	5	–	13	.278	7	–	23	.233
Portland	4	–	14	.222	6	–	24	.200
† 2017 WCC tournament winner As of March 18, 2017; Rankings from AP poll

The 2016–17 BYU Cougars women's basketball team represented Brigham Young University during the 2016–17 NCAA Division I women's basketball season. It was head coach Jeff Judkins's sixteenth season at BYU. The Cougars, members of the West Coast Conference, play their home games at the Marriott Center. They finished the season 20–12, 13–5 in WCC play to finish in a tie for second place. They advanced to the semifinals of the WCC women's tournament where they lost to Saint Mary's. They received an automatic bid to the WNIT where they lost to Washington State in the first round.

== Before the season ==
=== Departures ===
Name	Number	Pos.	Height	Year	Hometown	Notes
Kylie Maeda	3	G	5'5"	Senior	Honolulu, HI	Graduated
Lexi Rydalch	21	G	5'10	Senior	Mapleton, Utah	Graduated; Selected 26th by the Seattle Storm in the 2016 WNBA draft.

== 2016–17 media ==
=== BYU Radio Sports Network Affiliates ===
22 Cougar games that don't conflict with men's basketball or football games will be featured live on BYU Radio, found nationwide on Dish Network 980, on Sirius XM 143, and online at www.byuradio.org. Home games will be a BYUtv simulcast while road games will be voiced by Robbie Bullough or Mitchell Marshall. Select road games will air on TheW.tv.

== Roster ==
2016–17 BYU Cougars women's basketball team
Players
Coaches

Pos.	#	Name	Height	Year	Previous school	Hometown
G	1	Brenna Chase	5 ft 9 in (1.75 m)	Fr	Broomfield	Thornton, CO
F	2	Jessica Chatman	6 ft 0 in (1.83 m)	Fr	Union	Ridgefield, WA
F	3	Shalae Salmon	6 ft 3 in (1.91 m)	Fr	Wellington Girls' College	Porirua, New Zealand
F	4	Amanda Wayment	6 ft 1 in (1.85 m)	Jr	Fremont	Ogden, UT
G	11	Liz Eaton	5 ft 10 in (1.78 m)	Fr	Maple Mountain	Mapleton, UT
G	20	Cassie Broadhead	5 ft 8 in (1.73 m)	RS Jr	Scotia Glenville	Glenville, NY
G/F	22	Kristine Nielson	5 ft 11 in (1.8 m)	RS Sr	Palm Harbor University	Crystal Beach, FL
G	23	Makenzi Pulsipher	5 ft 8 in (1.73 m)	RS Sr	Alta	Draper, UT
F	32	Kalani Purcell	6 ft 2 in (1.88 m)	Sr	John Paul College/Hutchinson CC	Hamilton, NZ
F	33	Jasmine Moody	6 ft 2 in (1.88 m)	So	Radford	Honolulu, HI
F	34	Micaelee Orton	6 ft 2 in (1.88 m)	RS Sr	Kearns	Kearns, UT
F	35	Brooke Clawson	6 ft 1 in (1.85 m)	RS Jr	Woodrow Wilson/ASFM	Dallas, TX
F	43	Haley Rydalch	6 ft 3 in (1.91 m)	RS So	Desert Hills/Purdue	St. George, UT
C	50	MaCayla Hanks	6 ft 4 in (1.93 m)	So	Mountain Crest	Millville, UT

Head coach

- Jeff Judkins (Utah)

Assistant coach(es)

- Melinda Bendall (BYU)
- Ray Stewart (Utah Valley)
- Dan Nielson (BYU)
- Ashley Garfield- Director of Operations (BYU)

Legend

- (C) Team captain
- (S) Suspended
- (I) Ineligible
- (W) Walk-on
- Injured
- Current redshirt

Roster

== Schedule ==
Date time, TV	Rank^{#}	Opponent^{#}	Result	Record	Site city, state
Exhibition
11/02/2016*; 7:00 pm, BYUtv		Westminster	W 77–59	–	Marriott Center; Provo, UT
11/04/2016*; 7:00 pm, BYUtv		Colorado Mesa	W 81–62	–	Marriott Center; Provo, UT
Non-conference regular season
11/11/2016*; 7:00 pm, UVUtv		at Utah Valley	W 68–50	1–0	UCCU Center; Orem, UT
11/16/2016*; 5:00 pm, SEC+		at Georgia	L 51–81	1–1	Stegeman Coliseum; Athens, GA
11/19/2016*; 4:00 pm, TheW.tv		No. 16/17 Oklahoma	L 61–68	1–2	Marriott Center; Provo, UT
11/25/2016*; 4:30 pm		vs. Saint Joseph's; UNM Thanksgiving Tournament semifinals	W 71–56	2–2	The Pit; Albuquerque, NM
11/26/2016*; 12:00 pm		vs. Tulsa; UNM Thanksgiving Tournament championship	W 71–56	3–2	The Pit; Albuquerque, NM
12/02/2016*; 7:30 pm		vs. UNLV; Maui Wahine Classic	W 63–52	4–2	War Memorial Sports Complex; Wailuku, HI
12/03/2016*; 9:30 pm		vs. No. 24/18 Oregon State; Maui Wahine Classic	L 56–65	4–3	War Memorial Sports Complex; Wailuku, HI
12/07/2016*; 11:00 am, BYUtv		Weber State	W 73–64	5–3	Marriott Center; Provo, UT
12/10/2016*; 5:30 pm, P12N		at Utah; Deseret First Duel	L 60–77	5–4	Jon M. Huntsman Center; Salt Lake City, UT
12/17/2016*; 2:00 pm, MW Net		at Utah State	W 60–40	6–4	Smith Spectrum; Logan, UT
12/22/2016*; 2:00 pm, BYUtv		No. 9/9 Washington	L 70–82	6–5	Marriott Center; Provo, UT
WCC regular season
12/29/2016; 8:00 pm, TheW.tv		at Santa Clara	L 63–64	6–6 (0–1)	Leavey Center; Santa Clara, CA
12/31/2016; 2:00 pm, BYUtv		Loyola Marymount	W 76–59	7–6 (1–1)	Marriott Center; Provo, UT
01/05/2017; 7:00 pm, BYUtv		Saint Mary's	W 70–65	8–6 (2–1)	Marriott Center; Provo, UT
01/07/2017; 3:00 pm, TheW.tv		at Pacific	W 68–55	9–6 (3–1)	Alex G. Spanos Center; Stockton, CA
01/12/2017; 8:00 pm, TheW.tv		at San Francisco	L 63–70	9–7 (3–2)	War Memorial Gymnasium; San Francisco, CA
01/14/2017; 12:00 pm, BYUtv		San Diego	W 81–63	10–7 (4–2)	Marriott Center; Provo, UT
01/19/2017; 8:00 pm, TheW.tv		at Pepperdine	W 73–47	11–7 (5–2)	Firestone Fieldhouse; Malibu, CA
01/21/2017; 2:00 pm, BYUtv		Pacific	W 68–50	12–7 (6–2)	Marriott Center; Provo, UT
01/26/2017; 7:00 pm, BYUtv		Santa Clara	W 72–66 ^{2OT}	13–7 (7–2)	Marriott Center; Provo, UT
01/28/2017; 3:00 pm, TheW.tv		at Loyola Marymount	L 74–77 ^{OT}	13–8 (7–3)	Gersten Pavilion; Los Angeles, CA
02/02/2017; 7:00 pm, TheW.tv		at Gonzaga	L 52–87	13–9 (7–4)	McCarthey Athletic Center; Spokane, WA
02/04/2017; 3:00 pm, TheW.tv		at Portland	W 77–38	14–9 (8–4)	Chiles Center; Portland, OR
02/09/2017; 7:00 pm, BYUtv		Pepperdine	W 88–49	15–9 (9–4)	Marriott Center; Provo, UT
02/11/2017; 2:00 pm, BYUtv		San Francisco	W 73–61	16–9 (10–4)	Marriott Center; Provo, UT
02/16/2017; 7:00 pm, TheW.tv		at San Diego	W 65–47	17–9 (11–4)	Jenny Craig Pavilion; San Diego, CA
02/18/2017; 2:00 pm, TheW.tv		at Saint Mary's	L 58–64	17–10 (11–5)	McKeon Pavilion; Moraga, CA
02/23/2017; 7:00 pm, BYUtv		Portland	W 73–60	18–10 (12–5)	Marriott Center; Provo, UT
02/25/2017; 2:00 pm, BYUtv		Gonzaga	W 71–63	19–10 (13–5)	Marriott Center; Provo, UT
WCC Tournament
03/03/2017; 3:00 pm, BYUtv	(2)	vs. (7) San Diego; Quarterfinals	W 75–66 ^{OT}	20–10	Orleans Arena; Paradise, NV
03/06/2017; 3:00 pm, BYUtv	(2)	vs. (3) Saint Mary's; Semifinals	L 49–59	20-11	Orleans Arena; Paradise, NV
Women's National Invitation Tournament
03/16/2017*; 7:00 pm, BYUtv		Washington State; First Round	L 64–72	20-12	Marriott Center; Provo, UT
*Non-conference game. ^{#}Rankings from AP Poll / Coaches' Poll. (#) Tournament seedings in parentheses. All times are in Mountain.

== Game summaries ==
=== Exhibition: Westminster ===
Broadcasters: Spencer Linton, Kristen Kozlowski, & Jason Shepherd
Starting Lineups:

- Westminster: Aubrie Vale, Sydnee Taylor, Riley Reidhead, Denise Gonzalez, Whitni Syrett
- BYU: Cassie Broadhead, Kristine Nielson, Makenzi Pulsipher, Kalani Purcell, Jasmine Moody

BYUtv

Nov 2
7 p.m. MST

Recap

Westminster Griffins 59, BYU Cougars 77
Scoring by quarter: 12–23, 12–18, 17–18, 18–18
Pts: Sydnee Taylor 13; Rebs: Whitni Syrett 7 Asts: Denise Gonzalez 4	Pts: Cassie Broadhead, Kristine Nielson & Kalani Purcell 11; Rebs: Kalani Purcell 10; Asts: Cassie Broadhead, Kristine Nielson & Kalani Purcell 4

Marriott Center
Provo, UT
Attendance: 347
Referees: Anita Ortega, Cheryl Flores, Rigo Vasquez

=== Exhibition: Colorado Mesa ===
Broadcasters: Jarom Jordan, Kristen Kozlowski, & Jason Shepherd
Starting Lineups:

- Colorado Mesa: Nicole Archambeau, Bryanna Adams, Erin Reichle, Sydney Small, Kassidi Day
- BYU: Cassie Broadhead, Kristine Nielson, Makenzi Pulsipher, Kalani Purcell, Jasmine Moody

BYUtv

Nov 4
7 p.m. MST

Recap

Colorado Mesa Mavericks 62, BYU Cougars 81
Scoring by quarter: 11–22, 12–19, 17–21, 22–19
Pts: Erin Reichle 24; Rebs: Ma'ata Epenisa & Sydney Small 6 Asts: Bryanna Adams, Nicole Archambeau, Holly Brooks, Ma'ata Epenisa, Erin Reichle & Sydney Small 1	Pts: Cassie Broadhead 20; Rebs: Kalani Purcell 10; Asts: Kalani Purcell 5

Marriott Center
Provo, UT
Attendance: 335
Referees: Kyle Bacon, Benny Luna, Deon Lewis

=== Utah Valley ===
Broadcasters: None (Wolverine Green stream)/ Mitchell Marshall (BYUR)
Series History: BYU leads series 6–0
Starting Lineups:

- BYU: Makenzi Pulsipher, Cassie Broadhead, Kalani Purcell, Kristine Nielson, Jasmine Moody
- Utah Valley: Britta Hall, Mariah Seals, Taylor Gordon, Sam Lubcke, Jordan Holland

Nov 11
7 p.m. MST

Recap

BYU Cougars 68, Utah Valley Wolverines 50
Scoring by quarter: 13–13, 23–20, 17–8, 15–9
Pts: Makenzi Pulsipher 21; Rebs: Kalani Purcell 9 Asts: Kalani Purcell 4 Blocks: Cassie Broadhead 3	Pts: Britta Hall 18; Rebs: Taylor Gordon 12; Asts: Mariah Seals 3

UCCU Center
Orem, UT
Attendance: 1,578
Referees: Kenneth Nash, Renee Robinson, Katrina Lyles

=== Georgia ===
Broadcasters: Matt Stewart & Christi Thomas (SEC+)/ Mitchell Marshall (BYUR)
Series History: BYU leads series 1–0
Starting Lineups:

- BYU: Makenzi Pulsipher, Cassie Broadhead, Kalani Purcell, Kristine Nielson, Jasmine Moody
- Georgia: Halle Washington, Mackenzie Engram, Shanea Armbrister, Pachis Roberts, Haley Clark

SECN+

Nov 16
5 p.m. MST

Recap

BYU Cougars 51, Georgia Lady Bulldogs 81
Scoring by quarter: 13–16, 8–16, 8–28, 22–21
Pts: Cassie Broadhead 16; Rebs: Jasmine Moody 8 Asts: Kalani Purcell 3 Steals: Makenzi Pulsipher 5	Pts: Mackenzie Engram 21; Rebs: Shanea Armbrister & Caliya Robinson 6 Asts: Simone Costa 6

Stegeman Coliseum
Athens, GA
Attendance: 2,239
Referees: Felicia Grinter, Amy Bonner and Luis Gonzalez

=== Oklahoma ===
Broadcasters: Mitchell Marshall & Keilani Unga
Series History: Oklahoma leads series 4–1
Starting Lineups:

- Oklahoma: Maddie Manning, Vionise Pierre-Louis, Peyton Little, Gabbi Ortiz, Gioya Carter
- BYU: Makenzi Pulsipher, Cassie Broadhead, Kalani Purcell, Kristine Nielson, Jasmine Moody

TheW.tv

Nov 25
4 p.m. MST

Recap

Oklahoma Sooners 68, BYU Cougars 61
Scoring by quarter: 20–18, 11–26, 16–20, 21–7
Pts: Peyton Little 16; Rebs: Vionise Pierre-Louis 13; Asts: Gabbi Ortiz 7	Pts: Cassie Broadhead 18; Rebs: Kalani Purcell 13; Asts: Makenzi Pulsipher 7

Marriott Center
Provo, UT
Attendance: 1,236
Referees: Chuck Gonzalez, Kyle Bacon, Cheryl Flores

=== UNM Thanksgiving Tournament: Saint Joseph's ===
Series History: Series tied 1–1
Starting Lineups:

- Saint Joseph's: Mackenzie Rule, Alyssa Monaghan, Sarah Veilleux, Chelsea Woods, Adashia Franklyn
- BYU: Makenzi Pulsipher, Cassie Broadhead, Kalani Purcell, Kristine Nielson, Jasmine Moody

Nov 25
4:30 p.m. MST

Recap

Saint Joseph's Hawks 56, BYU Cougars 71
Scoring by quarter: 12–20, 11–16, 24–12, 9–23
Pts: Amanda Fioravanti 14; Rebs: Sarah Veilleux, Adashia Franklyn, Amanda Fioravanti 5 Asts: Jaryn Garner 4	Pts: Kristine Nielson 15; Rebs: Kalani Purcell 11; Asts: Cassie Broadhead 5

WisePies Arena
Albuquerque, NM
Attendance: N/A
Referees: Robert Strong, Blanca Burns, Brad Schmidt

=== UNM Thanksgiving Tournament: Tulsa ===
Series History: BYU leads series 7–0
Starting Lineups:

- Tulsa: Tatyana Perez, Erika Wakefield, Alexis Gaulden, Crystal Polk, Liesl Spoerl
- BYU: Makenzi Pulsipher, Cassie Broadhead, Kalani Purcell, Kristine Nielson, Jasmine Moody

Nov 26
12 p.m. MST

Recap

BYU Cougars 71, Tulsa Golden Hurricane 56
Scoring by quarter: 17–8, 11–14, 25–20, 18–21
Pts: Kalani Purcell 19; Rebs: Makenzi Pulsipher 8 Asts: Kalani Purcell 6	Pts: Jessica Pongonis 11; Rebs: Crystal Polk, Erika Wakefield, Jessica Pongonis 3 Asts: Erika Wakefield 5

WisePies Arena
Albuquerque, NM
Attendance: N/A
Referees: Brad Schmidt, John W. Haefeli, Blanca Burns

=== Maui Wahine Classic: UNLV ===
Series History: UNLV leads series 29–12
Starting Lineups:

- UNLV: Brooke Johnson, Paris Strawther, Nikki Wheatley, Dylan Gonzales, Katie Powell
- BYU: Makenzi Pulsipher, Cassie Broadhead, Kalani Purcell, Kristine Nielson, Jasmine Moody

Dec 2
7:30 p.m. MST

Recap

UNLV Lady Rebels 54, BYU Cougars 63
Scoring by quarter: 21–13, 5–12, 9–14, 19–24
Pts: Dylan Gonzales 12; Rebs: Nikki Wheatley 9 Asts: Brooke Johnson, Katie Powell 2	Pts: Kalani Purcell 16; Rebs: Cassie Broadhead, Kalani Purcell, Jasmine Moody 7 Asts: Kalani Purcell 7

War Memorial Gym
Wailuku, HI
Attendance: 947
Referees: Melissa Barlow, Darren Krzesnik, In'Fini Robinson

=== Maui Wahine Classic: Oregon State ===
Series History:BYU leads series 6–4
Starting Lineups:

- Oregon State: Sydney Wiese, Gabriella Hanson, Marie Gülich, Katie McWilliams, Kolbie Orum
- BYU: Makenzi Pulsipher, Cassie Broadhead, Kalani Purcell, Kristine Nielson, Jasmine Moody

Dec 3
9:30 p.m. MST

Recap

BYU Cougars 56, Oregon State Beavers 65
Scoring by quarter: 10–13, 10–20, 17–8, 19–24
Pts: Kalani Purcell 21; Rebs: Kalani Purcell 10; Asts: Kalani Purcell 3	Pts: Taylor Kalmer, Sydney Wiese 15; Rebs: Marie Gülich 10; Asts: Sydney Wiese 7

War Memorial Gym
Wailuku, HI
Attendance: 1,283
Referees: Melissa Barlow, Darren Krzenik, In'Fini Robinson

=== Weber State ===
Broadcasters: Spencer Linton, Kristen Kozlowski & Jason Shepherd
Series History: BYU leads series 43–9
Starting Lineups:

- Weber State: Emily Drake, Kailie Quinn, Deeshyra Thomas, Yarden Danan, Tyschal Blake
- BYU: Makenzi Pulsipher, Cassie Broadhead, Kalani Purcell, Kristine Nielson, Shalae Salmon

BYUtv

Dec 7
11:00 a.m. MST

Recap

Weber State Wildcats 64, BYU Cougars 73
Scoring by quarter: 21–19, 12–17, 17–19, 16–16
Pts: Emily Drake 15; Rebs: Jocelyn Adams 10; Asts: Deeshyra Thomas 8	Pts: Makenzi Pulsipher 22; Rebs: Kalani Purcell 11; Asts: Cassie Broadhead 8

Marriott Center
Provo, UT
Attendance: 5,046
Referees: Penny Davis, Alecia Murray, Evan Sharples

=== Utah ===
Broadcasters: Krista Blunk & Tammy Blackburn (P12)/ Robbie Bullough (BYUR)
Series History: BYU leads series 62–42
Starting Lineups:

- BYU: Makenzi Pulsipher, Cassie Broadhead, Kalani Purcell, Kristine Nielson, Shalae Salmon
- Utah: Emily Drake, Kailie Quinn, Deeshyra Thomas, Yarden Danan, Tyschal Blake

Pac-12 Network

Dec 10
4:30 p.m. MST

Recap

BYU Cougars 60, Utah Utes 77
Scoring by quarter: 20–13, 10–20, 7–27, 23–17
Pts: Cassie Broadhead 22; Rebs: Kalani Purcell 5 Asts: Makenzi Pulsipher 3	Pts: Emily Potter 21; Rebs: Emily Potter 10; Asts: Erika Bean 7

Huntsman Center
Salt Lake City, UT
Attendance: 3,033
Referees: Anita Ortega, Benny Luna, Alejandro Moreno

=== Utah State ===
Broadcasters: Craig Hislop (MW Net)/ Robbie Bullough (BYUR)
Series History: BYU leads series 34–3
Starting Lineups:

- BYU: Makenzi Pulsipher, Cassie Broadhead, Kalani Purcell, Kristine Nielson, Shalae Salmon
- Utah State: Hailey Bassett, Deja Mason, Eliza West, Jessie Geer, Rachel Brewster

MW Net

Dec 17
2:00 p.m. MST

Recap

BYU Cougars 60, Utah State Aggies 40
Scoring by quarter: 15–12, 12–10, 17–9, 16–9
Pts: Cassie Broadhead 20; Rebs: Kalani Purcell 8 Asts: Kalani Purcell 5	Pts: Hailey Bassett 16; Rebs: Deja Mason 11; Asts: Deja Mason 4

Smith Spectrum
Logan, UT
Attendance: 697
Referees: R-Brenda Pantoja, Chuck Gonzalez, Tiffany Jump

=== Washington ===
Broadcasters: Dave McCann, Kristen Kozlowski, & Jason Shepherd
Series History: Series even 5–5
Starting Lineups:

- Washington: Kesley Plum, Natalie Romeo, Aarion McDonald, Katie Collier, Chantel Osahor
- BYU: Makenzi Pulsipher, Cassie Broadhead, Kalani Purcell, Kristine Nielson, Shalae Salmon

BYUtv

Dec 22
2:00 p.m. MST

Recap

Washington Huskies 82, BYU Cougars 70
Scoring by quarter: 18–16, 25–7, 19–20, 20–27
Pts: Kelsey Plum 29; Rebs: Chantel Osahor 10; Asts: Kelsey Plum 5	Pts: Cassie Broadhead 24; Rebs: Kalani Purcell 10; Asts: Cassie Broadhead, Makenzi Pulsipher 4

Marriott Center
Provo, UT
Attendance: 775
Referees: Darren Krzesnik, Teresa Turner, Alex Carroll

=== Santa Clara ===
Broadcasters: Doug Greenwald
Series History: BYU leads series 13–1
Starting Lineups:

- BYU: Makenzi Pulsipher, Cassie Broadhead, Kalani Purcell, Kristine Nielson, Shalae Salmon
- Santa Clara: Morgan McGwire, Emily Wolph, Marie Bertholdt, Taylor Berry, Lori Parkinson

TheW.tv

Dec 29
8:00 p.m. MST

Recap

BYU Cougars 63, Santa Clara Broncos 64
Scoring by quarter: 17–12, 21–22, 15–17, 10–13
Pts: Cassie Broadhead 21; Rebs: Kalani Purcell 15; Asts: Cassie Broadhead 6 Turnovers: Kalani Purcell 9	Pts: Morgan McGwire 16; Rebs: Marie Bertholdt 7 Asts: Marie Bertholdt, Lori Parkinson, Emily Wolph 4

Leavey Center
Santa Clara, CA
Attendance: 443
Referees: Brenda Pantoja, Tiffany Jump, Erick Thome

=== Loyola Marymount ===
Broadcasters: Spencer Linton, Kristen Kozlowski, & Jason Shepherd
Series History: BYU lead series 12–1
Starting Lineups:

- Loyola Marymount: Cheyanne Walalce, Andee Velasco, Leslie Lopez-Wood, Brittney Reed, Jackie Johnson
- BYU: Makenzi Pulsipher, Cassie Broadhead, Kalani Purcell, Kristine Nielson, Shalae Salmon

BYUtv

Dec 31
2:00 p.m. MST

Recap

Loyola Marymount Lions 59, BYU Cougars 76
Scoring by quarter: 17–22, 13–23, 13–22, 16–9
Pts: Jackie Johnson 18; Rebs: Leslie Lopez-Wood 7 Asts: Andee Velasco 4	Pts: Cassie Broadhead 21; Rebs: Kalani Purcell 6 Asts: Kalani Purcell 11

Marriott Center
Provo, UT
Attendance: 793
Referees: Karen Lasuik, Kenneth Nash, Saif Esho

=== Saint Mary's ===
Broadcasters: Spencer Linton, Kristen Kozlowski, & Jason Shepherd
Series History: Series even 6–6
Starting Lineups:

- Saint Mary's: Devyn Galland, Carly Turner, Sydney Raggio, Megan McKay, Jasmine Forcadilla
- BYU: Makenzi Pulsipher, Cassie Broadhead, Kalani Purcell, Kristine Nielson, Shalae Salmon

BYUtv

Jan 5
7:00 p.m. MST

Recap

Saint Mary's Gaels 65, BYU Cougars 70
Scoring by quarter: 13–22, 12–16, 18–16, 22–16
Pts: Megan McKay 12; Rebs: Megan McKay, Devon Brookshire 5 Asts: Stella Beck 4	Pts: Cassie Broadhead 22; Rebs: Kalani Purcell 12; Asts: Kalani Purcell 9

Marriott Center
Provo, UT
Attendance: 390
Referees: Robert Scofield, Benny Luna, Teresa Turner

=== Pacific ===
Broadcasters: Don Gubbins (TheW.tv)/ Robbie Bullough (BYUR)
Series History: BYU lead series 11–2
Starting Lineups:

- BYU: Makenzi Pulsipher, Cassie Broadhead, Kalani Purcell, Kristine Nielson, Shalae Salmon
- Pacific: Emily Simons, Eli Lopez Sagrera, GeAnna Luaulu-Summers, Unique Coleman, Desire Finnie

TheW.tv

Jan 7
2:00 p.m. PST

Recap

BYU Cougars 68, Pacific Tigers 55
Scoring by quarter: 13–17, 26–11, 15–8, 14–19
Pts: Cassie Broadhead 20; Rebs: Kalani Purcell 13; Asts: Cassie Broadhead 8	Pts: GeAnna Luaulu-Summers 10; Rebs: Emily Simons 10; Asts: Chelsea Lidy, Najah Queenland 3

Alex G. Spanos Center
Stockton, CA
Attendance: 447
Referees: Cathi Cornell, Gordon Torigoe, Rigo Vasquez

=== San Francisco ===
Broadcasters: Kevin Danna
Series History: BYU leads series 15–3
Starting Lineups:

- BYU: Makenzi Pulsipher, Cassie Broadhead, Kalani Purcell, Kristine Nielson, Shalae Salmon
- San Francisco: Rachel Howard, Michaela Rakova, Anna Seilund, Alicia Roufosse, Kalyn Simon

TheW.tv

Jan 12
7:00 p.m. PST

Recap

BYU Cougars 63, San Francisco Dons 70
'Scoring by quarter: 17–15, 16–13, 14–19, 16–23
Pts: Cassie Broadhead 18; Rebs: Kalani Purcell 19; Asts: Kalani Purcell 4	Pts: Anna Seilund 19; Rebs: Michaela Rakova; Asts: Anna Pierce, Rachel Howard 4

War Memorial Gymnasium
San Francisco, CA
Attendance: 126
Referees: Brian Woods, Paul Patterson, Bobby Jarmon

=== San Diego ===
Broadcasters: Spencer Linton, Kristen Kozlowski, & Jason Shepherd
Series History: BYU lead series 9–3
Starting Lineups:

- San Diego: Aubrey Ward-El, Caroline Buhr, Katherine Hamilton, Cori Woodward, Sydney Williams
- BYU: Makenzi Pulsipher, Cassie Broadhead, Kalani Purcell, Kristine Nielson, Shalae Salmon

BYUtv

Jan 14
12:00 p.m. MST

Recap

San Diego Toreros 63, BYU Cougars 81
Scoring by quarter: 14–15, 12–26, 15–19, 22–21
Pts: Aubrey Ward-El 26; Rebs: Sydney Williams 6 Asts: Cori Woodward 6	Pts: Cassie Broadhead 30; Rebs: Cassie Broadhead 7 Asts: Cassie Broadhead 6

Marriott Center
Provo, UT
Attendance: 676
Referees: Bart Baldwin, Benny Luna, Brad Schmidt

=== Pepperdine ===
Broadcasters: Jane Carson
Series History: BYU leads series 13–2
Starting Lineups:

- BYU: Amanda Wayment, Cassie Broadhead, Kristine Nielson, Makenzi Pulsipher, Kalani Purcell
- Pepperdine: Sydney Bordonaro, Megan House, Paige Fecske, Keyari Sleezer, Kayla Blair

TheW.tv

Jan 19
7:00 p.m. PST

Recap

BYU Cougars 73, Pepperdine Waves 47
'Scoring by quarter: 14–7, 27–5, 19–15, 13–20
Pts: Cassie Broadhead 14; Rebs: Kalani Purcell 13; Asts: Kalani Purcell 13	Pts: Sydney Bordonaro 17; Rebs: Keyari Sleezer 7 Asts: Sydney Bordonaro 3

Firestone Fieldhouse
Malibu, CA
Attendance: 178
Referees: Michol Murray, Shelley Nakasone, Katrina Lyles

=== Pacific ===
Broadcasters: Spencer Linton, Kristen Kozlowski, & Jason Shepherd
Series History: BYU lead series 12–2
Starting Lineups:

- Pacific: Emily Simons, Eli Lopez Sagrera, GeAnna Luaulu-Summers, Unique Coleman, Desire Finnie
- BYU: Amanda Wayment, Cassie Broadhead, Kristine Nielson, Makenzi Pulsipher, Kalani Purcell

BYUtv

Jan 21
2:00 p.m. MST

Recap

Pacific Tigers 50, BYU Cougars 68
Scoring by quarter: 13–12, 6–16, 12–20, 19–20
Pts: GeAnna Luaulu-Summers 12; Rebs: Emily Simons 10; Asts: GeAnna Luaulu-Summers 3	Pts: Cassie Broadhead 23; Rebs: Kalani Purcell 8 Asts: Kalani Purcell 10

Marriott Center
Provo, UT
Attendance: 959
Referees: Richard Waters, Alecia Murray, Lucy Banuelos

=== Santa Clara ===
Broadcasters: Spencer Linton, Kristen Kozlowski, & Jason Shepherd
Series History: BYU leads series 13–2
Starting Lineups:

- Santa Clara: Taylor Berry, Beth Carlson, Lori Parkinson, Naomi Jimenez, Emily Wolph
- BYU: Amanda Wayment, Cassie Broadhead, Kristine Nielson, Makenzi Pulsipher, Kalani Purcell

BYUtv

Jan 26
7:00 p.m. MST

Recap

Santa Clara Broncos 66, BYU Cougars 72 (OT)
Scoring by quarter: 13–12, 11–19, 6–12, 27–14, Overtime: 8–8, 1–7
Pts: Emily Wolph 22; Rebs: Taylor Berry 16; Asts: Emily Wolph 4	Pts: Cassie Broadhead 28; Rebs: Kalani Purcell 17; Asts: Kalani Purcell 9

Marriott Center
Provo, UT
Attendance: 734
Referees: Melissa Barlow, Cheryll Blue, Corey Long Jr.

=== Loyola Marymount ===
Broadcasters: Hunter Patterson & Javier Villagomez (TheW.tv)/ Robbie Bullough (BYUR)
Series History: BYU lead series 13–1
Starting Lineups:

- BYU: Amanda Wayment, Cassie Broadhead, Kristine Nielson, Makenzi Pulsipher, Kalani Purcell
- Loyola Marymount: Cheyanne Wallace, Andee Velasco, Leslie Lopez-Wood, Brittney Reed, Jackie Johnson

TheW.tv

Jan 28
2:00 p.m. PST

Recap

BYU Cougars 74, Loyola Marymount Lions 77 (OT)
Scoring by quarter: 15–18, 14–16, 12–11, 22–18, Overtime: 11–14
Pts: Cassie Broadhead 25; Rebs: Kalani Purcell 17; Asts: Kalani Purcell 5	Pts: Jackie Johnson 23; Rebs: Jackie Johnson 14; Asts: Andee Velasco 7

Gersten Pavilion
Los Angeles, CA
Attendance: 442
Referees: Anita Ortega, Brad Schmidt, Lucy Banuelos

=== Gonzaga ===
Broadcasters: Steve Mykleburst (TheW.tv)/ (BYUR)
Series History: Gonzaga leads series 12–8
Starting Lineups:

- BYU:
- Gonzaga:

TheW.tv

Feb 2
6:00 p.m. PST

BYU Cougars vs. Gonzaga Bulldogs

McCarthey Athletic Center
Spokane, WA

=== Portland ===
Broadcasters: Cody Barton & Lindsey Gregg (TheW.tv)/ Robbie Bullough (BYUR)
Series History: BYU lead series 18–4
Starting Lineups:

- BYU:
- Portland:

TheW.tv

Feb 6
2:00 p.m. PST

BYU Cougars vs. Portland Pilots

Chiles Center
Portland, OR

=== Pepperdine ===
Broadcasters:
Series History: BYU leads series 14–2
Starting Lineups:

- Pepperdine:
- BYU:

BYUtv

Feb 9
7:00 p.m. MST

Pepperdine Waves vs. BYU Cougars

Marriott Center
Provo, UT

=== San Francisco ===
Broadcasters:
Series History: BYU leads series 15–4
Starting Lineups:

- San Francisco:
- BYU:

BYUtv

Feb 11
2:00 p.m. MST

San Francisco Dons vs. BYU Cougars

Marriott Center
Provo, UT

=== San Diego ===
Broadcasters: Paula Bott (TheW.tv)/ (BYUR)
Series History: BYU lead series 10–3
Starting Lineups:

- BYU:
- San Diego:

TheW.tv

Feb 16
6:00 p.m. PST

BYU Cougars vs. San Diego Toreros

The Slim Gym
San Diego, CA

=== Saint Mary's ===
Broadcasters: Elias Feldman (TheW.tv)/ (BYUR)
Series History: BYU leads series 7–6
Starting Lineups:

- BYU:
- Saint Mary's:

TheW.tv

Feb 18
1:00 p.m. PST

BYU Cougars vs. Saint Mary's Gaels

McKeon Pavilion
Moraga, CA

=== Portland ===
Broadcasters:
Series History: BYU lead series
Starting Lineups:

- Portland:
- BYU:

BYUtv

Feb 23
7:00 p.m. MST

Portland Pilots vs. BYU Cougars

Marriott Center
Provo, UT

=== Gonzaga ===
Broadcasters:
Series History: Gonzaga leads series
Starting Lineups:

- Gonzaga:
- BYU:

BYUtv

Feb 25
2:00 p.m. MST

Gonzaga Bulldogs vs. BYU Cougars

Marriott Center
Provo, UT

== See also ==
- 2016–17 BYU Cougars men's basketball team
