= 2016–17 Pacific Tigers women's basketball team =

Intercollegiate basketball season

2016–17 Pacific Tigers women's basketball
- Conference: West Coast Conference
- Record: 10–21 (5–13 WCC)
- Head coach: Bradley Davis (2nd season)
- Assistant coaches: Amy Starr; Alexis Mezzetta; Amy VanHollebeke
- Home arena: Alex G. Spanos Center

2016–17 West Coast Conference women's basketball standings
	Conf.				Overall
Team	W		L	PCT	W		L	PCT
Gonzaga†	14	–	4	.778	26	–	7	.788
BYU	13	–	5	.722	20	–	12	.625
Saint Mary's	13	–	5	.722	20	–	13	.606
San Francisco	11	–	7	.611	18	–	13	.581
Loyola Marymount	9	–	9	.500	14	–	16	.467
Santa Clara	9	–	9	.500	14	–	16	.467
San Diego	7	–	11	.389	14	–	16	.467
Pacific	5	–	13	.278	10	–	21	.323
Pepperdine	5	–	13	.278	7	–	23	.233
Portland	4	–	14	.222	6	–	24	.200
† 2017 WCC tournament winner As of March 18, 2017; Rankings from AP poll

The 2016–17 Pacific Tigers women's basketball team represented the University of the Pacific during the 2016–17 NCAA Division I women's basketball season. The Tigers were led by second year head coach Bradley Davis. They played their home games at Alex G. Spanos Center and were members of the West Coast Conference. They finished the season 10–21, 5–13 in WCC play to finish in a tie for eighth place. They advanced to the quarterfinals of the WCC women's tournament, where they lost to Gonzaga.

== Roster ==
2016–17 Pacific Tigers women's basketball team
Players
Coaches

Pos.	#	Name	Height	Year	Previous school	Hometown
G	1	Callie Owens	5 ft 10 in (1.78 m)	Fr	Plano West	Plano, TX
G/F	2	Jenelle Grant	6 ft 0 in (1.83 m)	Fr	Harris Westminster	London, England
F	3	Mauriana Clayton	6 ft 2 in (1.88 m)	Sr	Bishop Amat; Central Arizona	Rancho, CA
G	4	Tylah King	6 ft 0 in (1.83 m)	So	Brisbane State	Queensland, Australia
G/F	5	Emily Simons	5 ft 10 in (1.78 m)	Sr	Box Hill Secondary	Doncaster, Australia
F	11	Eli Lopez Sagrera	6 ft 2 in (1.88 m)	Sr	Southern Idaho	Barcelona, Spain
C	12	Sydney Fadal	6 ft 1 in (1.85 m)	Fr	St. Mary's	Stockton, CA
G	13	Chelsea Lidy	5 ft 9 in (1.75 m)	So	Bishop Montgomery	Torrance, CA
G	14	Jessica Blakeslee	5 ft 10 in (1.78 m)	Fr	Mercer Island	Mercer Island, WA
G	15	GeAnna Luaulu-Summers	5 ft 9 in (1.75 m)	Jr	Sacred Heart Cathedral	San Francisco, CA
G	20	Unique Coleman	5 ft 10 in (1.78 m)	Sr	St. Mary's	Stockton, CA
G	21	Ameela Li	5 ft 6 in (1.68 m)	So	Piedmont	Piedmont, CA
G/F	22	Desire Finnie	5 ft 11 in (1.8 m)	Jr	Berkeley	Berkeley, CA
G	30	Najah Queenland	5 ft 10 in (1.78 m)	Jr	Sacramento	Sacramento, CA

Head coach

- Bradley Davis (California)

Assistant coach(es)

- Amy Starr (Washington State)
- Alexis Mezzetta (UC San Diego)
- Amy VanHollebeke (Pacific)

Legend

- (C) Team captain
- (S) Suspended
- (I) Ineligible
- (W) Walk-on
- Injured
- Current redshirt

Roster

== Schedule ==
Date time, TV	Rank^{#}	Opponent^{#}	Result	Record	Site (attendance) city, state
Exhibition
10/30/2016*; 2:00 pm		Chico State	L 76–80 ^{OT}		Alex G. Spanos Center (463); Stockton, CA
11/04/2016*; 11:00 am		San Francisco State	W 91–42		Alex G. Spanos Center (2,119); Stockton, CA
Non-conference regular season
11/11/2016*; 8:30 pm		at No. 9 UCLA	L 55–82	0–1	Pauley Pavilion (9,160); Los Angeles, CA
11/13/2016*; 2:00 pm		UC Merced	W 111–50	1–1	Alex G. Spanos Center (376); Stockton, CA
11/18/2016*; 7:00 pm		at San Jose State	W 99–96 ^{OT}	2–1	Event Center Arena (392); San Jose, CA
11/21/2016*; 7:00 pm		UC Davis	L 87–95	2–2	Alex G. Spanos Center (411); Stockton, CA
11/25/2016*; 6:30 pm		Montana State; Tiger Turkey Tip-Off Thanksgiving Tournament	L 66–72	2–3	Alex G. Spanos Center (416); Stockton, CA
11/26/2016*; 3:30 pm		Marquette; Tiger Turkey Tip-Off Thanksgiving Tournament	L 75–89	2–4	Alex G. Spanos Center (400); Stockton, CA
12/04/2016*; 2:00 pm		Cal State Bakersfield	W 91–61	3–4	Alex G. Spanos Center (322); Stockton, CA
12/07/2016*; 5:00 pm		at Long Beach State	L 58–66	3–5	Walter Pyramid (715); Long Beach, CA
12/10/2016*; 5:00 pm		Fresno State	L 67–74	3–6	Stockton Arena; Stockton, CA
12/19/2016*; 7:00 pm		Northern Colorado	L 56–60	3–7	Alex G. Spanos Center (331); Stockton, CA
12/21/2016*; 2:00 pm		William Jessup	W 103–65	4–7	Alex G. Spanos Center (307); Stockton, CA
WCC regular season
12/29/2016; 7:00 pm		at Portland	W 84–74	5–7 (1–0)	Chiles Center (293); Portland, OR
12/31/2016; 2:00 pm		at Gonzaga	W 65–63	6–7 (2–0)	McCarthey Athletic Center (5,812); Spokane, WA
01/05/2017; 7:00 pm		San Diego	W 84–64	7–7 (3–0)	Alex G. Spanos Center (414); Stockton, CA
01/07/2017; 2:00 pm		BYU	L 55–68	7–8 (3–1)	Alex G. Spanos Center (447); Stockton, CA
01/12/2017; 7:00 pm		at Pepperdine	L 58–59	7–9 (3–2)	Firestone Fieldhouse (217); Malibu, CA
01/14/2017; 2:00 pm		San Francisco	W 63–60	8–9 (4–2)	Alex G. Spanos Center (369); Stockton, CA
01/16/2017; 7:00 pm		Saint Mary's	L 54–63	8–10 (4–3)	Alex G. Spanos Center (398); Stockton, CA
01/21/2017; 1:00 pm, BYUtv		at BYU	L 50–68	8–11 (4–4)	Marriott Center (959); Provo, UT
01/26/2017; 7:00 pm		Loyola Marymount	L 52–65	8–12 (4–5)	Alex G. Spanos Center (397); Stockton, CA
01/28/2017; 2:00 pm		at San Francisco	L 64–67	8–13 (4–6)	War Memorial Gymnasium (231); San Francisco, CA
02/02/2017; 6:30 pm		at Saint Mary's	L 74–82	8–14 (4–7)	McKeon Pavilion (184); Moraga, CA
02/04/2017; 2:00 pm		Pepperdine	W 80–79 ^{OT}	9–14 (5–7)	Alex G. Spanos Center (824); Stockton, CA
02/09/2017; 6:00 pm		at San Diego	L 71–73	9–15 (5–8)	Jenny Craig Pavilion (288); San Diego, CA
02/11/2017; 2:00 pm		at Santa Clara	L 51–68	9–16 (5–9)	Leavey Center (400); Santa Clara, CA
02/16/2017; 7:00 pm		Portland	L 71–78 ^{OT}	9–17 (5–10)	Alex G. Spanos Center (327); Stockton, CA
02/18/2017; 2:00 pm		Gonzaga	L 58–74	9–18 (5–11)	Alex G. Spanos Center (514); Stockton, CA
02/23/2017; 7:00 pm		Santa Clara	L 51–61	9–19 (5–12)	Alex G. Spanos Center (595); Stockton, CA
02/25/2017; 2:00 pm		at Loyola Marymount	L 64–75	9–20 (5–13)	Gersten Pavilion (518); Los Angeles, CA
WCC Women's Tournament
03/02/2017; 12:00 pm, BYUtv	(9)	vs. (8) Pepperdine; First Round	W 73–55	10–20	Orleans Arena; Paradise, NV
03/03/2017; 12:00 pm, BYUtv	(9)	vs. (1) Gonzaga; Quarterfinals	L 59–91	10–21	Orleans Arena; Paradise, NV
*Non-conference game. ^{#}Rankings from AP Poll. (#) Tournament seedings in parentheses. All times are in Pacific Time.

== Rankings ==
+ Regular season polls	Poll	Pre- season	Week 1	Week 2	Week 3	Week 4	Week 5	Week 6	Week 7	Week 8	Week 9	Week 10	Week 11	Week 12	Week 13	Week 14	Week 15	Week 16	Week 17	Week 18 Postseason	Final
AP																					
Coaches																					

Legend
	Increase in ranking
	Decrease in ranking
	No change
(RV)	Received votes

== See also ==
- 2016–17 Pacific Tigers men's basketball team
