= Laura Stockton =

American basketball player

No. 11 – Contimax MOSiR Bochnia
- Position: Point guard
- League: Basket Liga Kobiet

Personal information
- Born: October 13, 1996 (age 30) Spokane, Washington, U.S.
- Listed height: 5 ft 8 in (1.73 m)

Career information
- High school: Gonzaga (Spokane, Washington)
- College: Gonzaga (2015–2019)

Career history
- 2020–2021: Herner TC
- 2021: Montaneras de Morovis
- 2022: CAB Estepona
- 2022–2024: TK Hannover Luchse
- 2024–2026: Norrkoping Dolphins
- 2026–present: Contimax MOSiR Bochnia

Career highlights
- German Cup (2023); WCC All-Tournament (2017); First Team All-WCC (2019)

Laura M'liss Stockton (born October 13, 1996) is an American professional basketball player for Contimax MOSiR Bochnia of the Basket Liga Kobiet. She played college basketball for Gonzaga University. In 2023 and 2024, she won the German Cup with TK Hannover Luchse.

== Professional career ==
Stockton started her professional career with Herner TC in the Damen-Basketball-Bundesliga in 2020. She later played for Cab Estepona in Spain and Montaneras de Morovis in Puerto Rico before returning to the Bundesliga and signing with TK Hannover Luchse. She helped Hannover win the German Cup and reach the Bundesliga finals where they lost 0–3 against the Keltern Stars after their leading scorer, Angel Rizor suffered a broken hand in the first game of the series. Following the season, she re-signed with Hannover for the 2023–2024 season.

In August 2024, Stockton signed with Norrkoping Dolphins of the SBL Dam.

On 14 August 2026, Stockton moved to Polish team Contimax MOSiR Bochnia.

== Personal life ==
Stockton is the daughter of former NBA great John Stockton. Her brother David played in the NBA with the Sacramento Kings.

== Career statistics ==
Legend
GP	Games played	GS	Games started	MPG	Minutes per game	RPG	Rebounds per game
APG	Assists per game	SPG	Steals per game	BPG	Blocks per game	PPG	Points per game
TO	Turnovers per game	FG%	Field-goal percentage	3P%	3-point field-goal percentage	FT%	Free-throw percentage
**Bold**	Career best	°	League leader

=== College ===
Year	Team	GP	GS	MPG	FG%	3P%	FT%	RPG	APG	SPG	BPG	TO	PPG
2015–16	Gonzaga	**33**	0	18.2	40.6	**29.8**	74.3	1.4	2.5	1.0	0.1	2.2	6.7
2016–17	Gonzaga	**33**	**33**	**27.2**	**43.4**	22.2	75.9	2.8	**4.4**	1.3	**0.2**	2.2	8.0
2017–18	Gonzaga	29	28	26.2	41.1	17.9	67.5	**3.2**	3.8	1.4	**0.2**	2.3	6.6
2018–19	Gonzaga	30	30	27.1	40.4	21.6	**89.2**	**3.2**	4.2	**1.8**	0.1	**1.9**	**8.9**
**Career**		125	91	24.6	41.5	23.4	78.2	2.6	3.7	1.4	0.2	2.1	7.6
Statistics retrieved from Sports-Reference.
