= St. Francis High School (Sacramento, California) =

St. Francis Catholic High School

Location
- 5900 Elvas Avenue; Sacramento, California 95819; United States; 38°33′37″N 121°25′50″W

Information
- Type: Private, all-female
- Motto: Pax et Bonum (Peace and Goodness)
- Religious affiliation: Roman Catholic
- Established: 1940
- CEEB code: 052698
- Principal: Elias Mendoza
- Faculty: 74.0 (on an FTE basis)
- Grades: 9–12
- Enrollment: 964 (2021–22)
- Student to teacher ratio: 13.0:1
- Campus: Urban
- Colors: Red and Gold
- Athletics: 13 Sports with 23 teams
- Mascot: Troubadour
- Nickname: Troubies
- Team name: Troubadours
- Accreditation: Western Association of Schools and Colleges
- Newspaper: The Mandolin
- Yearbook: The Canticle
- Tuition: $16,640 (2024-2025)
- Affiliation: Roman Catholic Diocese of Sacramento

St. Francis Catholic High School is a private, Roman Catholic, all-female college-preparatory high school located in Sacramento, California. It is affiliated with the Roman Catholic Diocese of Sacramento and is one of four Catholic high schools in the area. The school serves students from over fifty private and public feeder schools across the California counties of Sacramento, Yolo, El Dorado, and Placer. Established in 1940, St. Francis is committed to providing a strong academic foundation rooted in Catholic values.

During the 2003–2004 school year, St. Francis completed the first phase of its campus renovation and expansion that doubled the size of its facilities. These new buildings include The Fine and Performing Arts Complex, Library/Resource Center, Gymnasium/Fitness Complex, four science labs, the Administration Building, and the Carlsen and Demetre Center for Campus Life (CLC).

== History ==
St. Francis started in the fall of 1940 with 12 female students from nearby St Francis Elementary. The school was run by the St. Francis Sisters of Penance and Christian Charity.

In 1975 the Sisters of Notre Dame and the Franciscan Sisters were no longer able to staff the school, and Bishop Alden J. Bell appointed the Sisters of the Apostles of the Sacred Heart of Jesus, who served until 1999.

Greta Gerwig, a 2002 graduate of the school, directed Lady Bird, a semi-autobiographical drama film based on her experiences growing up in Sacramento and her time at St. Francis. The film was nominated for 5 Academy Awards.

== Notable alumni ==
- Meghan Hays, communications executive
- Lio Tipton, credited as Analeigh Tipton through to 2021, actress and a contestant on America's Next Top Model, Cycle 11
- Greta Gerwig (2002), actress and filmmaker
- Eleni Kounalakis (1985), Lieutenant Governor of California

== Notable faculty ==
- Charlotte Mayorkas
