= 2016–17 Colorado State Rams women's basketball team =

Intercollegiate basketball season

2016–17 Colorado State Rams women's basketball

Mountain West Regular Season Champions

WNIT, Second Round
- Conference: Mountain West Conference
- Record: 25–9 (15–3 Mountain West)
- Head coach: Ryun Williams (5th season)
- Assistant coaches: Tim Moser; Brooke Atkinson; Rebecca Alvidrez
- Home arena: Moby Arena

2016–17 Mountain West Conference women's basketball standings
	Conf.				Overall
Team	W		L	PCT	W		L	PCT
Colorado State	15	–	3	.833	25	–	9	.735
Wyoming	13	–	5	.722	22	–	10	.688
Boise State†	12	–	6	.667	25	–	8	.758
UNLV	12	–	6	.667	22	–	11	.667
New Mexico	10	–	8	.556	15	–	15	.500
Utah State	9	–	9	.500	17	–	14	.548
Fresno State	8	–	10	.444	18	–	15	.545
San Jose State	7	–	11	.389	11	–	21	.344
San Diego State	6	–	12	.333	11	–	19	.367
Nevada	5	–	13	.278	11	–	19	.367
Air Force	2	–	16	.111	4	–	25	.138
† 2017 MW Tournament winner Rankings from AP poll

The 2016–17 Colorado State Rams women's basketball team represented Colorado State University in the 2016–17 NCAA Division I women's basketball season. The Rams, led by fifth year head coach Ryun Williams, played their home games at Moby Arena and were members of the Mountain West Conference. They finished the season 25–9, 15–3 in Mountain West play to win the regular season championship. They advanced to the semifinals of the Mountain West Conference women's basketball tournament where they lost to Boise State. They received an automatic bid to the Women's National Invitation Tournament where they defeated Saint Mary's in the first round before losing to UC Davis in the second round.

== Roster ==
2016–17 Colorado State Rams women's basketball team
Players
Coaches

Pos.	#	Name	Height	Year	Previous school	Hometown
G	1	Nathalie Liden	5 ft 10 in (1.78 m)	Fr	Lulea Gymnasieskola	Stockholm, Sweden
G	2	Stine Aistgulen	5 ft 11 in (1.8 m)	RS Jr	Langhaugen Videregaende	Bergen, Norway
G	4	Jordyn Edwards	5 ft 8 in (1.73 m)	Fr	Lynnwood	Seattle, WA
G	5	Sofie Tryggedsson	6 ft 0 in (1.83 m)	So	Aabyhøj	Aarhus, Denmark
G	10	Hannah Tvrdy	5 ft 10 in (1.78 m)	RS Jr	Seward; Nebraska	Seward, NE
G/F	12	Callie Kasier	5 ft 10 in (1.78 m)	So	Broomfield	Broomfield, CO
G	13	Ellen Nystrom	6 ft 1 in (1.85 m)	Sr	Luleå Gymnasieskola	BLuleå, Sweden
F	15	Veronika Mirkovic	6 ft 1 in (1.85 m)	Jr	Sandagymnasiet	Nässjö, Sweden
G/F	21	Myanne Hamm	5 ft 11 in (1.8 m)	RS Jr	Poudre	Fort Collins, CO
F	22	Elin Gustavsson	6 ft 3 in (1.91 m)	Sr	Sandagymnasiet	Ängelholm, Sweden
G	23	Grace Colaivalu	5 ft 7 in (1.7 m)	Fr	Rosemont	Sacramento, CA
F	24	Amanda Kantzy	6 ft 3 in (1.91 m)	So	Luleå Basketball Club	Vällingby, Sweden
C	33	Anna Dreimane	6 ft 5 in (1.96 m)	Fr	Riga State Gymnasium	Riga, Latvia
F	34	Liah Davis	6 ft 2 in (1.88 m)	Fr	Sand Creek	Colorado Springs, CO

Head coach

- Ryun Williams (South Dakota)

Assistant coach(es)

- Tim Moser (CSU Pueblo)
- Brooke Atkinson (Wichita State)
- Rebecca Alvidrez (Montana State)

Legend

- (C) Team captain
- (S) Suspended
- (I) Ineligible
- (W) Walk-on
- Injured
- Current redshirt

Roster

== Schedule ==
Date time, TV	Rank^{#}	Opponent^{#}	Result	Record	Site (attendance) city, state
Exhibition
11/04/2016*; 7:00 pm		CSU–Pueblo	W 56–48		Moby Arena; Fort Collins, CO
Non-conference regular season
11/11/2016*; 7:00 pm		Omaha; Preseason WNIT First Round	W 69–42	1–0	Moby Arena (1,201); Fort Collins, CO
11/14/2016*; 8:00 pm		at No. 17 Washington; Preseason WNIT quarterfinals	L 68–101	1–1	Alaska Airlines Arena (1,520); Seattle, WA
11/17/2016*; 6:00 pm		at Nebraska; Preseason WNIT consolation round	L 59–62	1–2	Pinnacle Bank Arena (4,229); Lincoln, NE
11/23/2016*; 2:30 pm		Adams State	W 76–29	2–2	Moby Arena (3,012); Fort Collins, CO
11/27/2016*; 1:00 pm		at No. 13 Oklahoma	L 55–70	2–3	Lloyd Noble Center (3,245); Norman, OK
11/30/2016*; 7:00 pm		Denver	W 76–49	3–3	Moby Arena (1,112); Fort Collins, CO
12/02/2016*; 7:00 pm		Southeastern Louisiana	W 77–31	4–3	Moby Arena (981); Fort Collins, CO
12/04/2016*; 2:00 pm		Northern Colorado	W 58–47	5–3	Moby Arena (1,178); Fort Collins, CO
12/08/2016*; 7:00 pm, P12N		at No. 18 Colorado	L 56–74	5–4	Coors Events Center (1,723); Boulder, CO
12/11/2016*; 2:00 pm		New Mexico Highlands	W 96–31	6–4	Moby Arena (1,073); Fort Collins, CO
12/18/2016*; 7:00 pm		Seattle	W 66–62	7–4	Moby Arena (945); Fort Collins, CO
12/21/2016*; 7:00 pm		at Montana	W 63–49	8–4	Dahlberg Arena (2,442); Missoula, MT
Mountain West regular season
12/29/2016; 4:00 pm		at UNLV	W 57–37	9–4 (1–0)	Cox Pavilion (1,003); Paradise, NV
12/31/2016; 2:00 pm		Boise State	L 45–51	9–5 (1–1)	Moby Arena (1,417); Fort Collins, CO
01/04/2017; 7:00 pm		San Jose State	W 70–67 ^{OT}	10–5 (2–1)	Moby Arena (681); Fort Collins, CO
01/07/2017; 4:00 pm		at Air Force	W 72–35	11–5 (3–1)	Clune Arena (384); Fort Collins, CO
01/14/2017; 3:00 pm		at New Mexico	W 78–63	12–5 (4–1)	The Pit (2,148); Albuquerque, NM
01/18/2017; 7:00 pm		Fresno State	W 73–56	13–5 (5–1)	Moby Arena (1,056); Fort Collins, CO
01/21/2017; 2:00 pm		Utah State	W 74–43	14–5 (6–1)	Moby Arena (1,223); Fort Collins, CO
01/25/2017; 8:00 pm		at San Jose State	W 68–56	15–5 (7–1)	Event Center Arena (1,145); San Jose, CA
01/28/2017; 2:00 pm		at San Diego State	W 60–43	16–5 (8–1)	Moby Arena (987); Fort Collins, CO
02/01/2017; 7:00 pm		Boise State	W 60–53	17–5 (9–1)	Taco Bell Arena (943); Boise, ID
02/04/2017; 2:00 pm		UNLV	W 44–41	18–5 (10–1)	Moby Arena (1,264); Fort Collins, CO
02/08/2017; 7:00 pm		at Utah State	L 48–55	18–6 (10–2)	Smith Spectrum (390); Logan, UT
02/11/2017; 3:00 pm		at Fresno State	W 66–64 ^{OT}	19–6 (11–2)	Save Mart Center (2,126); Fresno, CA
02/15/2017; 7:00 pm		Wyoming; Border War	W 61–54	20–6 (12–2)	Moby Arena (2,056); Fort Collins, CO
02/22/2017; 7:00 pm		New Mexico	W 58–55	21–6 (13–2)	Moby Arena (1,538); Fort Collins, CO
02/25/2017; 3:00 pm		at San Diego State	W 80–46	22–6 (14–2)	Viejas Arena (910); San Diego, CA
02/28/2017; 6:30 pm		at Wyoming; Border War	L 49–56	22–7 (14–3)	Arena-Auditorium (2,588); Laramie, WY
03/03/2017; 7:00 pm		Nevada	W 64–51	23–7 (15–3)	Moby Arena (2,243); Fort Collins, CO
Mountain West Women's Tournament
03/07/2017; 1:00 pm	(1)	vs. (8) San Jose State; Quarterfinals	W 65–60	24–7	Thomas & Mack Center; Paradise, NV
03/08/2017; 7:30 pm	(1)	vs. (4) Boise State; Semifinals	L 61–65	24–8	Thomas & Mack Center (1,670); Paradise, NV
Women's National Invitation Tournament
03/16/2017*; 7:00 pm		Saint Mary's; First Round	W 80–68 ^{OT}	25–8	Moby Arena (1,281); Fort Collins, CO
03/19/2017*; 2:00 pm		UC Davis; Second Round	L 57–58	25–9	Moby Arena (1,403); Fort Collins, CO
*Non-conference game. ^{#}Rankings from AP Poll. (#) Tournament seedings in parentheses. All times are in Mountain Time.

== Rankings ==
2016–17 NCAA Division I women's basketball rankings

+ Regular season polls	Poll	Pre- Season	Week 2	Week 3	Week 4	Week 5	Week 6	Week 7	Week 8	Week 9	Week 10	Week 11	Week 12	Week 13	Week 14	Week 15	Week 16	Week 17	Week 18	Week 19	Final
AP	RV	RV	NR	NR	NR	NR	NR	NR	NR	NR	NR	NR	NR	RV	NR	RV	RV	NR		N/A	
Coaches	RV	NR	NR	NR	NR	NR	NR	NR	NR	NR	NR	NR	NR	NR	NR	NR	NR	NR			

Legend
	Increase in ranking
	Decrease in ranking
	Not ranked previous week
(RV)	Received Votes

== See also ==
- 2016–17 Colorado State Rams men's basketball team
