= Northern Illinois Huskies basketball =

Northern Illinois Huskies basketball may refer to either of the basketball teams that represent Northern Illinois University:

- Northern Illinois Huskies men's basketball
- Northern Illinois Huskies women's basketball
