= 2016–17 Air Force Falcons women's basketball team =

Intercollegiate basketball season

2016–17 Air Force Falcons women's basketball
- Conference: Mountain West Conference
- Record: 4–25 (2–16 Mountain West)
- Head coach: Chris Gobrecht (2nd season)
- Assistant coaches: Stacy McIntyre; Erin Mills-Reid; Clare Fitzpatrick; Rynae Rasley
- Home arena: Clune Arena

2016–17 Mountain West Conference women's basketball standings
	Conf.				Overall
Team	W		L	PCT	W		L	PCT
Colorado State	15	–	3	.833	25	–	9	.735
Wyoming	13	–	5	.722	22	–	10	.688
Boise State†	12	–	6	.667	25	–	8	.758
UNLV	12	–	6	.667	22	–	11	.667
New Mexico	10	–	8	.556	15	–	15	.500
Utah State	9	–	9	.500	17	–	14	.548
Fresno State	8	–	10	.444	18	–	15	.545
San Jose State	7	–	11	.389	11	–	21	.344
San Diego State	6	–	12	.333	11	–	19	.367
Nevada	5	–	13	.278	11	–	19	.367
Air Force	2	–	16	.111	4	–	25	.138
† 2017 MW Tournament winner Rankings from AP poll

The 2016–17 Air Force Falcons women's basketball team represented the United States Air Force Academy during the 2016–17 NCAA Division I women's basketball season. The Falcons, led by second head coach Chris Gobrecht, played their home games at the Clune Arena on the Air Force Academy's main campus in Colorado Springs, Colorado and were members of the Mountain West Conference. They finished the season 4–25, 2–16 in Mountain West play to finish in last place. They lost in the first round of the Mountain West women's tournament to Utah.

== Roster ==
2016–17 Air Force Falcons women's basketball team
Players
Coaches

Pos.	#	Name	Height	Year	Previous school	Hometown
G/F	0	Dee Bennett	6 ft 0 in (1.83 m)	Jr	Miami Norland Senior	Miami, FL
G/F	1	Jenn Urbaniak	6 ft 0 in (1.83 m)	Fr	Palmer	Colorado Springs, CO
G	3	Rileymarie Clarke	5 ft 11 in (1.8 m)	So	Emerald Ridge	Puyallup, WA
G	5	Sarah Falvey	5 ft 6 in (1.68 m)	Sr	Fr. Gabriel Richard	Plymouth, MI
G	10	Venessannah Itugbu	5 ft 9 in (1.75 m)	So	Mesa Ridge	Colorado Springs, CO
G	11	Cortney Porter	5 ft 9 in (1.75 m)	Jr	Bonneville	Ogden, UT
G/F	12	Kailin Davis	5 ft 11 in (1.8 m)	Fr	Weatherford	Weatherford, TX
F	13	Sarah Fotsch	5 ft 11 in (1.8 m)	Sr	Brookfield Central	Brookfield, WI
G	15	Ifeoma Emeka	5 ft 10 in (1.78 m)	Fr	Inglemoor	Bothell, WA
F	20	Cheyenne Wall	6 ft 1 in (1.85 m)	So	North Carolina School of Science & Mathematics	Clayton, NC
G	23	Sarah Pierce	5 ft 7 in (1.7 m)	Fr	Community	Unionville, TN
F	25	Erika Chapman	5 ft 10 in (1.78 m)	Jr	Byron P. Steele	Cibolo, TX
G	30	Stefawn Perrin	5 ft 6 in (1.68 m)	Fr	Blaine	Blaine, WA
F	32	Darby Glaab	5 ft 11 in (1.8 m)	So	Talawanda	Hamilton, OH
G	33	Mariah Forde	5 ft 10 in (1.78 m)	Fr	Belen	Belen, OH
G	34	Patricia Rosich	5 ft 10 in (1.78 m)	Fr	Florida Air Academy	Corozal, PR
F	55	Kassady Huffman	6 ft 2 in (1.88 m)	Fr	Air Academy	Colorado Springs, CO

Head coach

- Chris Gobrecht (USC)

Assistant coach(es)

- Stacy McIntyre (Kentucky)
- Erin Mills-Reid (Fairleigh Dickinson)
- Clare Fitzpatrick (Cornell)
- Rynae Rasley (CCNY)

Legend

- (C) Team captain
- (S) Suspended
- (I) Ineligible
- (W) Walk-on
- Injured
- Current redshirt

Roster

== Schedule and results ==
Date time, TV	Rank^{#}	Opponent^{#}	Result	Record	Site (attendance) city, state
Exhibition
11/06/2016*; 2:00 pm		Western State Colorado	W 71–48		Clune Arena; Colorado Springs, CO
Non-conference regular season
11/11/2016*; 7:00 pm		at Denver	L 52–65	0–1	Magness Arena (568); Denver, CO
11/13/2016*; 2:00 pm		at Colorado	L 68–95	0–2	Coors Events Center (1,845); Boulder, CO
11/19/2016*; 4:00 pm		Weber State	L 61–76	0–3	Clune Arena (280); Colorado Springs, CO
11/23/2016*; 5:00 pm		at Army	L 47–75	0–4	Christl Arena (631); West Point, NY
11/26/2016*; 11:00 am		at Fairleigh Dickinson	W 56–48	1–4	Rothman Center (306); Teaneck, NJ
11/29/2016*; 6:00 pm		Navy	L 46–64	1–5	Clune Arena (535); Colorado Springs, CO
12/02/2016*; 7:00 pm		Vanderbilt; Air Force Classic semifinals	L 49–75	1–6	Clune Arena (312); Colorado Springs, CO
12/02/2016*; 1:00 pm		Utah Valley; Air Force Classic 3rd place game	W 64–53	2–6	Clune Arena (318); Colorado Springs, CO
12/10/2016*; 4:00 pm		Northern Colorado	L 44–71	2–7	Clune Arena (375); Colorado Springs, CO
12/18/2016*; 2:00 pm		Eastern Washington	Cancelled		Clune Arena; Colorado Springs, CO
12/21/2016*; 5:00 pm, ESPN3		at Eastern Michigan	L 44–65	2–8	Convocation Center (637); Ypsilanti, MI
Mountain West regular season
12/29/2016; 7:00 pm		Wyoming	L 54–66	2–9 (0–1)	Clune Arena (386); Colorado Springs, CO
12/31/2016; 2:00 pm		at Utah State	L 62–65	2–10 (0–2)	Smith Spectrum (519); Logan, UT
01/07/2017; 4:00 pm		Colorado State	L 35–72	2–11 (0–3)	Clune Arena (384); Colorado Springs, CO
01/11/2017; 8:00 pm		at Fresno State	W 63–40	2–12 (0–4)	Save Mart Center (1,221); Fresno, CA
01/14/2017; 4:00 pm		at San Jose State	W 86–74	2–13 (0–5)	Event Center Arena (527); San Jose, CA
01/18/2017; 7:00 pm		Nevada	L 51–56	2–14 (0–6)	Clune Arena (431); Colorado Springs, CO
01/21/2017; 4:00 pm		UNLV	L 56–60	2–15 (0–7)	Clune Arena (387); Colorado Springs, CO
01/25/2017; 7:30 pm		at San Diego State	W 62–59	3–15 (1–7)	Viejas Arena (1,023); San Diego, CA
02/01/2017; 7:00 pm		Fresno State	L 56–72	3–16 (1–8)	Clune Arena (521); Colorado Springs, CO
02/04/2017; 2:00 pm		at Wyoming	L 41–73	3–17 (1–9)	Arena-Auditorium (2,327); Laramie, WY
02/08/2017; 7:00 pm		at New Mexico	L 64–81	3–18 (1–10)	The Pit (4,622); Albuquerque, NM
02/11/2017; 2:00 pm		Boise State	L 59–69	3–19 (1–11)	Clune Arena (358); Colorado Springs, CO
02/15/2017; 7:30 pm		at Nevada	L 58–65	3–20 (1–11)	Lawlor Events Center (824); Reno, NV
02/18/2017; 4:00 pm		San Jose State	L 67–83	3–21 (1–12)	Clune Arena (356); Colorado Springs, CO
02/22/2017; 7:00 pm		at UNLV	L 38–52	3–22 (1–13)	Cox Pavilion (825); Paradise, NV
02/25/2017; 2:00 pm		Utah State	W 64–61	4–22 (2–13)	Clune Arena (392); Colorado Springs, CO
02/28/2017; 7:00 pm		San Diego State	L 51–64	4–23 (2–14)	Clune Arena (356); Colorado Springs, CO
03/03/2017; 7:00 pm		at Boise State	L 48–72	4–24 (2–16)	Taco Bell Arena (1,435); Boise, ID
Mountain West Women's Tournament
03/06/2017; 7:00 pm, MWN	(11)	vs. (6) Utah State; First Round	L 40–46	4–25	Thomas & Mack Center (1,414); Paradise, NV
*Non-conference game. ^{#}Rankings from AP Poll. (#) Tournament seedings in parentheses. All times are in Mountain Time.

== See also ==
- 2016–17 Air Force Falcons men's basketball team
