= 2016–17 UNLV Lady Rebels basketball team =

Intercollegiate basketball season

2016–17 UNLV Lady Rebels basketball

WNIT, First Round
- Conference: Mountain West Conference
- Record: 22-10 (12-6 Mountain West)
- Head coach: Kathy Olivier (9th season)
- Assistant coaches: Caitlin Collier; Mia Bell; Peggy Smith
- Home arena: Thomas & Mack Center; Cox Pavilion

2016–17 Mountain West Conference women's basketball standings
	Conf.				Overall
Team	W		L	PCT	W		L	PCT
Colorado State	15	–	3	.833	25	–	9	.735
Wyoming	13	–	5	.722	22	–	10	.688
Boise State†	12	–	6	.667	25	–	8	.758
UNLV	12	–	6	.667	22	–	11	.667
New Mexico	10	–	8	.556	15	–	15	.500
Utah State	9	–	9	.500	17	–	14	.548
Fresno State	8	–	10	.444	18	–	15	.545
San Jose State	7	–	11	.389	11	–	21	.344
San Diego State	6	–	12	.333	11	–	19	.367
Nevada	5	–	13	.278	11	–	19	.367
Air Force	2	–	16	.111	4	–	25	.138
† 2017 MW Tournament winner Rankings from AP poll

The 2016–17 UNLV Lady Rebels basketball team represented the University of Nevada, Las Vegas during the 2016–17 NCAA Division I women's basketball season. The Lady Rebels, led by ninth year head coach Kathy Olivier, played their home games at the Thomas & Mack Center and the Cox Pavilion on UNLV's main campus in Paradise, Nevada. They were a member of the Mountain West Conference.

== Roster ==
2016–17 UNLV Lady Rebels women's basketball team
Players
Coaches

Pos.	#	Name	Height	Year	Previous school	Hometown
G	0	Kennedy Wharton	5 ft 7 in (1.7 m)	Jr	Grays Harbor College	Las Vegas, NV
G	1	Tiara Tucker	5 ft 4 in (1.63 m)	Jr	San Joaquin Delta CC	Stockton, CA
G	2	Brooke Johnson	5 ft 11 in (1.8 m)	Jr	Hanford HS	Hanford, CA
F	3	Paris Strawther	6 ft 2 in (1.88 m)	So	Liberty HS	Las Vegas, NV
F	5	Simone Sheppard	6 ft 0 in (1.83 m)	Jr	Sacramento HS	Sacramento, CA
F	10	Nikki Wheatley	5 ft 5 in (1.65 m)	Jr	Bonita HS	La Verne, CA
G	11	Dylan Gonzales	6 ft 0 in (1.83 m)	RS Jr	Highland HS; Kansas	Pocatello, ID
G	12	Dakota Gonzales	6 ft 0 in (1.83 m)	RS Jr	Highland HS; Kansas	Pocatello, ID
F	20	Alyssa Anderson	6 ft 0 in (1.83 m)	Jr	Etiwanda HS	Ranch Cucamonga, CA
C	21	Katie Powell	6 ft 4 in (1.93 m)	RS So	Duluth HS; Arkansas	Duluth, GA
F/C	22	Destiney Lee	6 ft 2 in (1.88 m)	So	C. K. McClatchy HS	Sacramento, CA
F	23	Jordyn Bell	6 ft 1 in (1.85 m)	Fr	Bradshaw Christian HS	Elk Grove, CA
C	24	Rodjanae Wade	6 ft 2 in (1.88 m)	Fr	Edison HS	Fresno, CA

Head coach

- Kathy Olivier (UNLV)

Assistant coach(es)

- Caitlin Collier (UC Davis)
- Mia Bell (UNLV)
- Peggy Smith

Legend

- (C) Team captain
- (S) Suspended
- (I) Ineligible
- (W) Walk-on
- Injured
- Current redshirt

Roster

== Schedule ==
Date time, TV	Rank^{#}	Opponent^{#}	Result	Record	Site (attendance) city, state
Non-conference regular season
11/11/2016*; 4:00 pm		Concordia (CA)	W 102–46	1–0	Thomas & Mack Center (845); Paradise, NV
11/15/2016*; 6:00 pm		Houston	W 64–53	2–0	Cox Pavilion (1,060); Paradise, NV
11/19/2016*; 4:00 pm		USC	W 77–66	3–0	Thomas & Mack Center (1,301); Paradise, NV
11/26/2016*; 12:00 pm		Tennessee State; Lady Rebel Round-Up semifinals	W 69–48	4–0	Cox Pavilion; Paradise, NV
11/27/2016*; 2:30 pm		Ole Miss; Lady Rebel Round-Up championship	W 64–57	5–0	Cox Pavilion (841); Paradise, NV
12/02/2016*; 6:30 pm		vs. BYU; Maui Wahine Classic	L 54–63	5–1	War Memorial Sports Complex; Wailuku, HI
12/03/2016*; 6:30 pm		vs. Idaho; Maui Wahine Classic	W 73–61	6–1	War Memorial Sports Complex (487); Wailuku, HI
12/09/2016*; 1:00 pm		at Pepperdine	W 68–61	7–1	Firestone Fieldhouse (538); Malibu, CA
12/12/2016*; 5:00 pm		at UC Irvine	W 62–46	8–1	Bren Events Center (220); Irvine, CA
12/19/2016*; 8:00 pm		vs. No. 25 Oregon State; Play4Kay Shootout quarterfinals	L 59–62	8–2	T-Mobile Arena (1,407); Paradise, NV
12/20/2016*; 3:00 pm		vs. New Mexico State; Play4Kay Shootout consolation 2nd round	W 52–47	9–2	T-Mobile Arena; Paradise, NV
12/21/2016*; 3:00 pm		vs. No. 21 South Florida; Play4Kay Shootout 5th place game	L 42–77	9–3	T-Mobile Arena; Paradise, NV
Mountain West regular season
12/29/2016; 3:00 pm		Colorado State	L 37–57	9–4 (0–1)	Cox Pavilion (1,003); Paradise, NV
12/31/2016; 1:00 pm		at Wyoming	L 57–79	9–5 (0–2)	Arena-Auditorium (2,831); Laramie, WY
01/04/2017; 6:00 pm		at Boise State	W 58–55	10–5 (1–2)	Taco Bell Arena (267); Boise, ID
01/07/2017; 4:00 pm		Utah State	W 55–53 ^{OT}	11–5 (2–2)	Cox Pavilion (1,854); Paradise, NV
01/11/2017; 6:00 pm		New Mexico	W 56–42	12–5 (3–2)	Cox Pavilion (2,236); Paradise, NV
01/18/2017; 6:30 pm		at San Diego State	L 68–87	12–6 (3–3)	Viejas Arena (742); San Diego, CA
01/21/2017; 3:00 pm		at Air Force	W 60–56	13–6 (4–3)	Clune Arena (436); Colorado Springs, CO
01/25/2017; 6:00 pm		Wyoming	W 51–46	14–6 (5–3)	Cox Pavilion (865); Paradise, NV
01/28/2017; 4:00 pm		San Jose State	L 65–76	14–7 (5–4)	Cox Pavilion (2,302); Paradise, NV
02/01/2017; 6:00 pm		at New Mexico	W 61–52	15–7 (6–4)	The Pit (3,128); Albuquerque, NM
02/04/2017; 1:00 pm		at Colorado State	L 41–44	15–8 (6–5)	Moby Arena (1,264); Fort Collins, CO
02/08/2017; 6:00 pm		Nevada	W 60–41	16–8 (7–5)	Cox Pavilion (1,002); Paradise, NV
02/11/2017; 2:00 pm		at San Jose State	W 63–55	17–8 (8–5)	Event Center Arena (267); San Jose, CA
02/18/2017; 6:00 pm		San Diego State	W 80–62	18–8 (9–5)	Cox Pavilion (1,585); Paradise, NV
02/22/2017; 6:00 pm		Air Force	W 52–38	19–8 (10–5)	Cox Pavilion (825); Paradise, NV
02/25/2017; 4:00 pm		at Nevada	W 64–49	20–8 (11–5)	Lawlor Events Center (2,331); Reno, NV
02/28/2017; 6:00 pm		at Utah State	L 49–58	20–9 (11–6)	Smith Spectrum (477); Logan, UT
03/03/2017; 6:00 pm		Fresno State	W 54–38	21–9 (12–6)	Cox Pavilion (1,531); Paradise, NV
Mountain West Women's Tournament
03/07/2017; 9:30 pm	(3)	vs. (6) Utah State; Quarterfinals	W 68–43	22–9	Thomas & Mack Center; Paradise, NV
03/08/2017; 9:00 pm	(3)	vs. (7) Fresno State; Semifinals	L 51–53	22–10	Thomas & Mack Center (1,670); Paradise, NV
*Non-conference game. ^{#}Rankings from AP Poll. (#) Tournament seedings in parentheses. All times are in Pacific Time.

== Rankings ==
2016–17 NCAA Division I women's basketball rankings

Regular season polls
Poll	Pre- Season	Week 2	Week 3	Week 4	Week 5	Week 6	Week 7	Week 8	Week 9	Week 10	Week 11	Week 12	Week 13	Week 14	Week 15	Week 16	Week 17	Week 18	Week 19	Final
AP	NR	NR	NR	NR	NR	RV	NR	NR	NR	NR	NR	NR	NR	NR						N/A
Coaches	NR	NR	NR	NR	NR	NR	NR	NR	NR	NR	NR	NR	NR	NR						

Legend
	Increase in ranking
	Decrease in ranking
	No change
(RV)	Received votes
(NR)	Not ranked

== See also ==
- 2016–17 UNLV Runnin' Rebels basketball team
