= 2016–17 Utah State Aggies women's basketball team =

Intercollegiate basketball season

2016–17 Utah State Aggies women's basketball

Lady Griz Classic Champions

WBI, First Round
- Conference: Mountain West Conference
- Record: 17–15 (9–9 Mountain West)
- Head coach: Jerry Finkbeiner (5th season)
- Assistant coaches: Ben Finkbeiner; JC Carter; Kelsie Kruger
- Home arena: Smith Spectrum

2016–17 Mountain West Conference women's basketball standings
	Conf.				Overall
Team	W		L	PCT	W		L	PCT
Colorado State	15	–	3	.833	25	–	9	.735
Wyoming	13	–	5	.722	22	–	10	.688
Boise State†	12	–	6	.667	25	–	8	.758
UNLV	12	–	6	.667	22	–	11	.667
New Mexico	10	–	8	.556	15	–	15	.500
Utah State	9	–	9	.500	17	–	14	.548
Fresno State	8	–	10	.444	18	–	15	.545
San Jose State	7	–	11	.389	11	–	21	.344
San Diego State	6	–	12	.333	11	–	19	.367
Nevada	5	–	13	.278	11	–	19	.367
Air Force	2	–	16	.111	4	–	25	.138
† 2017 MW Tournament winner Rankings from AP poll

The 2016–17 Utah State Aggies women's basketball team represented Utah State University in the 2016–17 NCAA Division I women's basketball season. The Aggies, led by fifth year head coach Jerry Finkbeiner, played their home games at the Smith Spectrum and were third year members of the Mountain West Conference. They finished the season 17–15, 9–9 in Mountain West play to finish in sixth place. They advanced to the quarterfinals of the Mountain West women's tournament, where they lost to UNLV. They were invited to the Women's Basketball Invitational, where they lost to Idaho in the first round.

== Roster ==
2016–17 Utah State Aggies women's basketball team
Players
Coaches

Pos.	#	Name	Height	Year	Previous school	Hometown
G	1	Eliza West	5 ft 5 in (1.65 m)	Fr	Peninsula School	Mount Martha, Australia
G	2	Jessie Geer	5 ft 8 in (1.73 m)	Fr	Campbell County HS	Gillette, WY
G	3	Olivia West	5 ft 5 in (1.65 m)	Fr	Templestowe College	Launceston, Australia
F	5	Shannon Dufficy	6 ft 1 in (1.85 m)	Fr	Our Lady of Mercy College	Preston, Australia
G	11	Lindsey Jensen	5 ft 9 in (1.75 m)	So	Sky View	Smithfield, UT
G/F	12	Hailey Bassett	6 ft 2 in (1.88 m)	Fr	Layton	Layton, UT
G	21	Victoria Price	5 ft 8 in (1.73 m)	Fr	Grand Prairie	Grand Prairie, TX
G	22	Rachel Brewster	5 ft 11 in (1.8 m)	So	Rowville Secondary College	Melbourne, Australia
F	30	Dee Moore	6 ft 4 in (1.93 m)	Fr	Allen	Allen, TX
G	31	Katie Toole	5 ft 10 in (1.78 m)	So	Viewmont HS	Bountiful, UT
G	32	Taylor Enders	5 ft 10 in (1.78 m)	So	West Linn HS	West Linn, OR
G	33	Lizzy Klinker	5 ft 10 in (1.78 m)	So	Fairfield HS	Fairfield, MT
F	35	Angelica de Paulo	6 ft 2 in (1.88 m)	Jr	Escola Estadual Doutor Jose Fornari; New Mexico JC	São Paulo, Brazil
F	41	Antonia Robinson	6 ft 2 in (1.88 m)	Sr	Duncanville HS; New Mexico JC	Dallas, TX
C	44	Deja Mason	6 ft 4 in (1.93 m)	So	Brennan HS	San Antonio, TX

Head coach

- Jerry Finkbeiner (Southern Nazarene)

Assistant coach(es)

- Ben Finkbeiner (Oral Roberts)
- JC Carter (Southwest Baptist)
- Kelsie Kruger (Adams State)

Legend

- (C) Team captain
- (S) Suspended
- (I) Ineligible
- (W) Walk-on
- Injured
- Current redshirt

Roster

== Schedule ==
Date time, TV	Rank^{#}	Opponent^{#}	Result	Record	Site (attendance) city, state
Exhibition
11/06/2016*; 2:00 pm		CSU–Pueblo	W 63–54		Smith Spectrum; Logan, UT
Non-conference regular season
11/11/2016*; 12:00 pm		Westminster College	W 72–49	1–0	Smith Spectrum (510); Logan, UT
11/14/2016*; 8:15 pm		Montana State	W 64–56	2–0	Smith Spectrum (633); Logan, UT
11/17/2016*; 11:00 am		UC Irvine	W 66–52	3–0	Smith Spectrum (2,487); Logan, UT
11/22/2016*; 5:30 pm		Southern Utah	L 54–70	3–1	Smith Spectrum (854); Logan, UT
11/25/2016*; 2:00 pm		vs. Incarnate Word; 36th Lady Griz Classic	W 79–46	4–1	Dahlberg Arena (256); Missoula, MT
11/27/2016*; 2:00 pm		at Montana; 36th Lady Griz Classic	W 65–46	5–1	Dahlberg Arena (2,506); Missoula, MT
12/01/2016*; 7:00 pm		Idaho State	W 69–56	6–1	Smith Spectrum (665); Logan, UT
12/03/2016*; 2:00 pm		at Utah	L 58–65	6–2	Jon M. Huntsman Center (1,190); Salt Lake City, UT
12/15/2016*; 7:00 pm		Utah Valley	W 56–45	7–2	Smith Spectrum (563); Logan, UT
12/17/2016*; 2:00 pm		BYU	L 40–60	7–3	Smith Spectrum (697); Logan, UT
12/21/2016*; 6:00 pm		at Arizona	L 57–61	7–4	McKale Center (1,133); Tucson, AZ
Mountain West regular season
12/29/2016; 7:00 pm		at Boise State	L 56–76	7–5 (0–1)	Taco Bell Arena (807); Boise, ID
12/31/2016; 2:00 pm		Air Force	W 65–62	8–5 (1–1)	Smith Spectrum (519); Logan, UT
01/04/2017; 7:00 pm		at New Mexico	L 67–78	8–6 (1–2)	The Pit (4,554); Albuquerque, NM
01/07/2017; 5:00 pm		at UNLV	L 53–55 ^{OT}	8–7 (1–3)	Cox Pavilion (1,854); Paradise, NV
01/11/2017; 7:00 pm		Wyoming	L 48–71	8–8 (1–4)	Smith Spectrum (528); Logan, UT
01/14/2017; 2:00 pm		San Diego State	W 53–47	9–8 (2–4)	Smith Spectrum (517); Logan, UT
01/21/2017; 2:00 pm		at Colorado State	L 43–74	9–9 (2–5)	Moby Arena (1,223); Fort Collins, CO
01/25/2017; 7:00 pm		New Mexico	L 58–68	9–10 (2–6)	Smith Spectrum (523); Logan, UT
01/28/2017; 3:00 pm		at Fresno State	W 52–47	10–10 (3–6)	Save Mart Center (2,042); Fresno, CA
02/01/2017; 7:30 pm		at Nevada	W 81–69	11–10 (4–6)	Lawlor Events Center (1,129); Reno, NV
02/04/2017; 2:00 pm		Boise State	W 65–63	12–10 (5–6)	Smith Spectrum (490); Logan, UT
02/08/2017; 7:00 pm		Colorado State	W 55–48	13–10 (6–6)	Smith Spectrum (390); Logan, UT
02/11/2017; 2:00 pm		at Wyoming	L 40–59	13–11 (6–7)	Arena-Auditorium (2,295); Laramie, WY
02/15/2017; 7:30 pm		at San Diego State	L 59–66	13–12 (6–8)	Viejas Arena (464); San Diego, CA
02/18/2017; 2:00 pm		Nevada	W 60–57	14–12 (7–8)	Smith Spectrum (595); Logan, UT
02/22/2017; 7:00 pm		San Jose State	W 82–78	15–12 (8–8)	Smith Spectrum (370); Logan, UT
02/25/2017; 2:00 pm		at Air Force	L 61–64	15–13 (8–9)	Clune Arena (392); Colorado Springs, CO
02/28/2017; 7:00 pm		UNLV	W 58–49	16–13 (9–9)	Smith Spectrum (477); Logan, UT
Mountain West Women's Tournament
03/06/2017; 8:00 pm	(6)	vs. (11) Air Force; First Round	W 46-40	17-13	Thomas & Mack Center (567); Paradise, NV
03/07/2017*; 9:30 pm	(6)	at (3) UNLV; Quarterfinals	L 43–68	17-14	Thomas & Mack Center; Paradise, NV
WBI
03/15/2017; 6:30 pm		at Idaho; First Round	L 57–64	17–15	Cowan Spectrum; Moscow, ID
*Non-conference game. ^{#}Rankings from AP Poll. (#) Tournament seedings in parentheses. All times are in Mountain Time.

== See also ==
- 2016–17 Utah State Aggies men's basketball team
