= 2016–17 New Mexico Lobos women's basketball team =

Intercollegiate basketball season

2016–17 New Mexico Lobos women's basketball
- Conference: Mountain West Conference
- Record: 15–15 (10–8 Mountain West)
- Head coach: Mike Bradbury (1st season)
- Assistant coaches: Valerie King; Erin Grant; Aarika Hughes
- Home arena: The Pit

2016–17 Mountain West Conference women's basketball standings
	Conf.				Overall
Team	W		L	PCT	W		L	PCT
Colorado State	15	–	3	.833	25	–	9	.735
Wyoming	13	–	5	.722	22	–	10	.688
Boise State†	12	–	6	.667	25	–	8	.758
UNLV	12	–	6	.667	22	–	11	.667
New Mexico	10	–	8	.556	15	–	15	.500
Utah State	9	–	9	.500	17	–	14	.548
Fresno State	8	–	10	.444	18	–	15	.545
San Jose State	7	–	11	.389	11	–	21	.344
San Diego State	6	–	12	.333	11	–	19	.367
Nevada	5	–	13	.278	11	–	19	.367
Air Force	2	–	16	.111	4	–	25	.138
† 2017 MW Tournament winner Rankings from AP poll

The 2016–17 New Mexico Lobos women's basketball team represented the University of New Mexico during the 2016–17 NCAA Division I women's basketball season. The Lobos, led by first year head coach Mike Bradbury. They played their home games at The Pit and are a member of the Mountain West Conference. They finished the season 15–15, 10–8 in Mountain West play to finish in fifth place. They lost in the quarterfinals of the Mountain West women's tournament to Boise State.

== Roster ==
2016–17 New Mexico Lobos women's basketball team
Players
Coaches
captain

Pos.	#	Name	Height	Year	Previous school	Hometown
G	0	Cherise Beynon	5 ft 10 in (1.78 m)	Jr	Canyon Springs HS	Las Vegas, NV
F	1	Brittany Panetti	6 ft 1 in (1.85 m)	Fr	Tompkins HS	Katy, TX
F	3	Josie Greenwood	5 ft 11 in (1.8 m)	Sr	Rosny College	Hobart, Australia
G	2	Tesha Buck (redshirt)	6 ft 0 in (1.83 m)	RS Sr	Red Wing; Green Bay	Red Wing, MN
G	4	Alex Lapeyrolerie	5 ft 11 in (1.8 m)	RS Jr	Edward S. Marcus HS	Highland Village, TX
C	10	Hannah Sjerven	6 ft 2 in (1.88 m)	Fr	Rogers HS	Otsego, MN
G	11	Emily Lines	6 ft 1 in (1.85 m)	So	First Baptist Academy	Naples, FL
C	15	Richelle van der Keijl	6 ft 5 in (1.96 m)	RS Jr	Wright State	Delft, The Netherlands
G	22	Mykiel Burleson	5 ft 11 in (1.8 m)	Fr	Pflugerville HS	Pflugerville, TX
G	24	Jayda Bovero	5 ft 11 in (1.8 m)	Jr	Syracuse HS	Farr West, UT
G	25	Laneah Bryan	5 ft 6 in (1.68 m)	Jr	Franklin HS	El Paso, TX
F	32	Kianna Keller	6 ft 4 in (1.93 m)	Sr	Waukesha West HS	Waukesha, WI
F	42	Erica Moore (redshirt)	6 ft 2 in (1.88 m)	Jr	Mount Vernon; Purdue	Fortville, IN
C	44	Jaisa Nunn	6 ft 3 in (1.91 m)	So	Juanita HS	Kirkland, WA

Head coach

- Mike Bradbury (Chattanooga)

Assistant coach(es)

- Valerie King (Cincinnati)
- Erin Grant (Texas Tech)
- Aarika Hughes (USC)

Legend

- (C) Team captain
- (S) Suspended
- (I) Ineligible
- (W) Walk-on
- Injured
- Current redshirt

Roster

== Schedule and results ==
Date time, TV	Rank^{#}	Opponent^{#}	Result	Record	Site (attendance) city, state
Exhibition
11/01/2016*; 7:00 pm		Fort Lewis	W 101–48		The Pit (4,443); Albuquerque, NM
11/06/2016*; 2:00 pm		Eastern New Mexico	W 89–70		The Pit (4,628); Albuquerque, NM
Non-conference regular season
11/12/2016*; 2:00 pm		Fairleigh Dickinson	W 83–56	1–0	The Pit (4,854); Albuquerque, NM
11/17/2016*; 7:00 pm		New Mexico State; Rio Grande Rivalry	W 84–55	2–0	The Pit (4,727); Albuquerque, NM
11/20/2016*; 1:00 pm, FSSW		at Texas Tech	L 58–69	2–1	United Supermarkets Arena (3,697); Lubbock, TX
11/25/2016*; 7:00 pm		Tulsa; UNM Thanksgiving Tournament semifinals	L 64–67	2–2	The Pit (4,894); Albuquerque, NM
11/26/2016*; 2:30 pm		Saint Joseph's; UNM Thanksgiving Tournament 3rd place game	L 67–79	2–3	The Pit (3,592); Albuquerque, NM
11/30/2016*; 5:30 pm		at New Mexico State; Rio Grande Rivalry	L 70–77	2–4	Pan American Center (1,171); Las Cruces, NM
12/03/2016*; 1:00 pm		SMU	W 64–49	3–4	The Pit (4,336); Albuquerque, NM
12/06/2016*; 7:00 pm		Minnesota	L 65–69	3–5	The Pit (4,387); Albuquerque, NM
12/11/2016*; 2:00 pm		UTEP	W 79–66	4–5	The Pit (4,596); Albuquerque, NM
12/18/2016*; 2:00 pm		Eastern Illinois			The Pit; Albuquerque, NM
12/21/2016*; 10:30 am		at Marquette	L 52–62	4–6	Al McGuire Center (3,700); Milwaukee, WI
Mountain West regular season
12/29/2016; 8:00 pm		at Fresno State	W 80–54	5–6 (1–0)	Save Mart Center (2,042); Fresno, CA
12/31/2016; 7:00 pm		San Diego State	W 85–42	6–6 (2–0)	The Pit (4,303); Albuquerque, NM
01/04/2017; 7:00 pm		Utah State	W 78–67	7–6 (3–0)	The Pit (4,554); Albuquerque, NM
01/07/2017; 5:00 pm		at Nevada	W 69–63	8–6 (4–0)	Lawlor Events Center (1,032); Reno, NV
01/11/2017; 7:00 pm		at UNLV	L 42–56	8–7 (4–1)	Cox Pavilion (2,236); Paradise, NV
01/14/2017; 3:00 pm		at Colorado State	W 78–63	8–8 (4–2)	The Pit (2,788); Albuquerque, NM
01/18/2017; 7:00 pm		Boise State	W 75–68	9–8 (5–2)	The Pit (3,324); Albuquerque, NM
01/21/2017; 2:00 pm		at Wyoming	L 52–68	9–9 (5–3)	Arena-Auditorium (2,778); Laramie, WY
01/25/2017; 7:00 pm		at Utah State	W 68–58	10–9 (6–3)	Smith Spectrum (523); Logan, UT
01/28/2017; 7:00 pm		at Nevada	W 59–50	11–9 (7–3)	The Pit (3,241); Albuquerque, NM
02/01/2017; 7:00 pm		UNLV	L 52–61	12–10 (7–4)	The Pit (3,128); Albuquerque, NM
02/04/2017; 3:00 pm		at San Jose State	W 82–72	13–10 (8–4)	Event Center Arena (439); San Jose, CA
02/08/2017; 7:00 pm		Air Force	W 81–64	14–10 (9–4)	The Pit (4,622); Albuquerque, NM
02/15/2017; 7:00 pm		at Boise State	L 62–64	14–11 (9–5)	Taco Bell Arena (948); Boise, ID
02/18/2017; 1:00 pm		Fresno State	W 66–57	15–11 (10–5)	The Pit (4,895); Albuquerque, NM
02/22/2017; 7:00 pm		at Colorado State	L 55–58	15–12 (10–6)	Moby Arena (1,538); Fort Collins, CO
02/25/2017; 1:00 pm		Wyoming	L 58–60	15–13 (10–7)	The Pit (5,239); Albuquerque, NM
03/03/2017; 6:30 pm		at San Diego State	L 51–63	15–14 (10–8)	Viejas Arena (1,474); San Diego, CA
Mountain West Women's Tournament
03/07/2017; 3:30 pm	(5)	vs. (4) Boise State; Quarterfinals	L 62–64	15–15	Thomas & Mack Center (1,642); Paradise, NV
*Non-conference game. ^{#}Rankings from AP Poll. (#) Tournament seedings in parentheses. All times are in Mountain Time.

== See also ==
2016–17 New Mexico Lobos men's basketball team
