= 2016–17 Wyoming Cowgirls basketball team =

Intercollegiate basketball season

2016–17 Wyoming Cowgirls basketball

WNIT, Second Round
- Conference: Mountain West Conference
- Record: 22–10 (13–5 Mountain West)
- Head coach: Joe Legerski (14th season)
- Assistant coaches: Gerald Mattinson; Bojan Janković; Heather Ezell
- Home arena: Arena-Auditorium

2016–17 Mountain West Conference women's basketball standings
	Conf.				Overall
Team	W		L	PCT	W		L	PCT
Colorado State	15	–	3	.833	25	–	9	.735
Wyoming	13	–	5	.722	22	–	10	.688
Boise State†	12	–	6	.667	25	–	8	.758
UNLV	12	–	6	.667	22	–	11	.667
New Mexico	10	–	8	.556	15	–	15	.500
Utah State	9	–	9	.500	17	–	14	.548
Fresno State	8	–	10	.444	18	–	15	.545
San Jose State	7	–	11	.389	11	–	21	.344
San Diego State	6	–	12	.333	11	–	19	.367
Nevada	5	–	13	.278	11	–	19	.367
Air Force	2	–	16	.111	4	–	25	.138
† 2017 MW Tournament winner Rankings from AP poll

The 2016–17 Wyoming Cowgirls basketball team represented the University of Wyoming in the 2016–17 college basketball season. The Cowgirls are led by fourteenth year head coach Joe Legerski. The Cowgirls played their home games at the Arena-Auditorium and were members of the Mountain West Conference. They finished the season 22–10, 13–5 in Mountain West play to finish in second place. They lost in the quarterfinals of the Mountain West women's tournament to Fresno State. They were invited to the Women's National Invitation Tournament where they defeated Seattle in the first round before losing in to Washington State in the second round.

== Roster ==
2016–17 Wyoming Cowgirls women's basketball team
Players
Coaches

Pos.	#	Name	Height	Year	Previous school	Hometown
G	3	Daley Handy	6 ft 0 in (1.83 m)	RS Fr	Maize HS	Wichita, KS
F	4	Taylor Rusk	5 ft 11 in (1.8 m)	Fr	ThunderRidge HS	Highlands Ranch, CO
G	5	Rikka Kujala	5 ft 5 in (1.65 m)	So	Vimpelin Lukio High School	Vimpeli, Finland
F	10	Selale Kepenc	6 ft 2 in (1.88 m)	Fr	Bostenci Doga College	Istanbul, Turkey
F	12	Marta Gomez	6 ft 1 in (1.85 m)	So	INS Joaquim Blume High School	Valles, Spain
G	13	Liv Roberts	5 ft 11 in (1.8 m)	Jr	Sentinel HS	Missoula, MT
F	14	Natalie Baker	6 ft 0 in (1.83 m)	Jr	Chaparral HS	Parker, CO
G	22	Clara Tapia	5 ft 7 in (1.7 m)	So	Universitat Pompeu Fabra	Barcelona, Spain
F	23	Bailee Cotton	6 ft 2 in (1.88 m)	RS So	Denver School S&T	Denver, CO
G	24	Skyler Snodgrass	5 ft 10 in (1.78 m)	Jr	Andover Central HS	Wichita, KS
F	32	Tijana Raca	6 ft 0 in (1.83 m)	So	Aristoteleio College	Pyles Thessaloniki, Greece
G	33	Hailey Ligocki	5 ft 8 in (1.73 m)	Sr	Sheridan HS	Sheridan, WY
F	40	Coreen Labish	6 ft 2 in (1.88 m)	So	Mead HS	Cheney, WA
F	42	Marleah Campbell	6 ft 2 in (1.88 m)	Jr	Shawnee Mission West HS	Lenexa, KS
F	44	Rachelle Tucker	6 ft 2 in (1.88 m)	So	Pierce HS	Pierce, NE

Head coach

- Joe Legerski (Wyoming)

Assistant coach(es)

- Gerald Mattinson (Weber State)
- Bojan Janković (Ozarks)
- Heather Ezell (Iowa State)

Legend

- (C) Team captain
- (S) Suspended
- (I) Ineligible
- (W) Walk-on
- Injured
- Current redshirt

Roster
Last update: September 5, 2016

== Statistics ==
Player	GP	GS	MPG	FG%	3FG%	FT%	RPG	APG	SPG	BPG	PPG
Natalie Baker	32	30	27.9	.424	.318	.879	5.7	1.2	0.7	0.3	9.7
Marleah Campbell	29	0	8.6	.525	.333	.846	1.8	0.3	0.1	0.3	3.2
Bailee Cotton	32	31	18.5	.431	.000	.692	4.8	0.6	0.5	0.2	5.9
Marta Gomez	32	9	24.0	.418	.396	.818	3.0	1.7	0.5	0.2	8.8
Daley Handy	10	0	4.3	.200	.000	.000	0.8	0.5	0.2	0.0	0.4
Selale Kepenc	14	0	5.2	.306	.385	.875	1.5	0.2	0.3	0.1	2.8
Riikka Kujala	24	0	8.6	.333	.333	.833	0.6	0.7	0.1	0.0	0.8
Hailey Ligocki	32	32	27.3	.417	.182	.661	2.4	2.5	1.0	0.3	7.3
Tijana Raca	10	0	4.0	.000	.000	.500	0.4	0.2	0.1	0.1	0.1
Liv Roberts	25	25	32.6	.496	.410	.814	7.8	2.4	1.2	0.2	15.6
Taylor Rusk	32	1	21.2	.487	.446	.593	2.2	1.5	0.8	0.1	6.3
Skyler Snodgrass	13	0	5.2	.292	.235	.250	1.2	0.3	0.2	0.0	1.5
Clara Tapia	32	32	30.2	.400	.365	.680	2.2	4.5	1.1	0.1	6.2
Rachelle Tucker	19	0	8.9	.600	.000	.667	2.7	0.1	0.1	0.1	4.8

== Schedule ==
Date time, TV	Rank^{#}	Opponent^{#}	Result	Record	Site (attendance) city, state
Exhibition
11/04/2016*; 6:30 pm		South Dakota Tech	W 62–54		Arena-Auditorium (2,398); Laramie, WY
Non-conference regular season
11/11/2016*; 5:30 pm		Chadron State	W 74–50	1–0	Arena Auditorium (2,530); Laramie, WY
11/13/2016*; 11:00 am		at Michigan State	L 51–63	1–1	Breslin Center (4,138); East Lansing, MI
11/17/2016*; 6:30 pm		Denver	W 59–49	2–1	Arena Auditorium (1,764); Laramie, WY
11/20/2016*; 1:00 pm		Cal State Fullerton	W 61–26	3–1	Arena Auditorium (2,170); Laramie, WY
11/22/2016*; 6:30 pm		Adams State	W 79–40	4–1	Arena Auditorium (2,801); Laramie, WY
11/27/2016*; 1:00 pm		at Drake	L 50–63	4–2	Knapp Center (2,153); Des Moines, IA
12/02/2016*; 6:30 pm		Southern Utah	W 68–48	5–2	Arena Auditorium (2,304); Laramie, WY
12/04/2016*; 1:00 pm		South Dakota	W 69–62 ^{OT}	6–2	Arena Auditorium (2,058); Laramie, WY
12/09/2016*; 6:30 pm		Idaho	L 71–75	6–3	Arena Auditorium (2,309); Laramie, WY
12/18/2016*; 2:00 pm		at Montana	W 67–42	7–3	Dahlberg Arena (2,569); Missoula, MT
12/21/2016*; 7:00 pm		at No. 15 Colorado	W 82–75	8–3	Coors Events Center (1,982); Boulder, CO
Mountain West regular season
12/29/2016; 7:00 pm		at Air Force	W 66–54	9–3 (1–0)	Clune Arena (386); Colorado Springs, CO
12/31/2016; 2:00 pm		UNLV	W 79–57	10–3 (2–0)	Arena Auditorium (2,831); Laramie, WY
01/04/2017; 6:30 pm		Fresno State	W 70–48	11–3 (3–0)	Arena Auditorium (2,054); Laramie, WY
01/11/2016; 7:00 pm		at Utah State	W 71–48	12–3 (4–0)	Smith Spectrum (528); Logan, UT
01/14/2017; 5:00 pm		at Nevada	W 72–59	13–3 (5–0)	Lawlor Events Center (1,016); Reno, NV
01/18/2017; 6:30 pm		San Jose State	W 89–60	14–3 (6–0)	Arena Auditorium (2,218); Laramie, WY
01/21/2017; 2:00 pm		New Mexico	W 68–52	15–3 (7–0)	Arena Auditorium (2,788); Laramie, WY
01/25/2016; 7:00 pm		at UNLV	L 46–51	15–4 (7–1)	Cox Pavilion (865); Las Vegas, NV
01/28/2017; 2:00 pm		at Boise State	L 54–64	15–5 (7–2)	Taco Bell Arena (938); Boise, ID
02/01/2017; 6:30 pm		San Diego State	W 80–67	16–5 (8–2)	Arena Auditorium (2,031); Laramie, WY
02/04/2017; 2:00 pm		Air Force	W 73–41	17–5 (9–2)	Arena Auditorium (2,327); Laramie, WY
02/08/2017; 8:00 pm		at Fresno State	L 47–52	17–6 (9–3)	Save Mart Center (2,035); Fresno, CA
02/11/2017; 2:00 pm		Utah State	W 59–40	18–6 (10–3)	Arena Auditorium (2,295); Laramie, WY
02/15/2017; 7:00 pm		at Colorado State; Border War	L 54–61	18–7 (10–4)	Moby Arena (2,056); Fort Collins
02/18/2017; 2:00 pm		Boise State	L 43–53	18–8 (10–5)	Arena Auditorium (2,952); Laramie, WY
02/25/2016; 2:00 pm		at New Mexico	W 60–58	19–8 (11–5)	The Pit (5,239); Albuquerque, NM
02/28/2017; 6:30 pm		Colorado State; Border War	W 56–49	20–8 (12–5)	Arena Auditorium (3,588); Laramie, WY
03/03/2017; 8:00 pm		at San Jose State	W 68–59	21–8 (13–5)	Event Center Arena (763); San Jose, CA
Mountain West Women's Tournament
03/07/2017; 7:00 pm	(2)	vs. (7) Fresno State; Quarterfinals	L 48-58	21–9	Thomas & Mack Center (1,642); Paradise, NV
WNIT
03/16/2017; 6:30 pm		Seattle; First Round	W 68–52	22–9	Arena Auditorium (1,671); Laramie, WY
03/18/2017; 2:00 pm		Washington State; Second Round	L 67–68 ^{OT}	22–10	Arena Auditorium (1,871); Laramie, WY
*Non-conference game. ^{#}Rankings from AP Poll. (#) Tournament seedings in parentheses. All times are in Mountain Time. All dates, times, and TV are tentative and subject to change.

== Rankings ==
2016–17 NCAA Division I women's basketball rankings

+ Regular season polls	Poll	Pre- Season	Week 2	Week 3	Week 4	Week 5	Week 6	Week 7	Week 8	Week 9	Week 10	Week 11	Week 12	Week 13	Week 14	Week 15	Week 16	Week 17	Week 18	Week 19	Final
AP	NR	NR	NR	NR	NR	NR	NR	NR	NR	NR	NR	RV	NR	NR	NR	NR	NR	NR	NR	N/A	
Coaches	NR	NR	NR	NR	NR	NR	NR	NR	NR	NR	NR	NR	NR	NR	NR	NR	NR	NR	NR		

Legend
	Increase in ranking
	Decrease in ranking
	Not ranked previous week
(RV)	Received Votes

== See also ==
- 2016–17 Wyoming Cowboys basketball team
