= 2016–17 San Diego State Aztecs women's basketball team =

Intercollegiate basketball season

2016–17 San Diego State Aztecs women's basketball
- Conference: Mountain West Conference
- Record: 11–19 (6–12 Mountain West)
- Head coach: Stacie Terry (4th season)
- Assistant coaches: Jesse Clark; Ciara Carl; Nick Grant
- Home arena: Viejas Arena

2016–17 Mountain West Conference women's basketball standings
	Conf.				Overall
Team	W		L	PCT	W		L	PCT
Colorado State	15	–	3	.833	25	–	9	.735
Wyoming	13	–	5	.722	22	–	10	.688
Boise State†	12	–	6	.667	25	–	8	.758
UNLV	12	–	6	.667	22	–	11	.667
New Mexico	10	–	8	.556	15	–	15	.500
Utah State	9	–	9	.500	17	–	14	.548
Fresno State	8	–	10	.444	18	–	15	.545
San Jose State	7	–	11	.389	11	–	21	.344
San Diego State	6	–	12	.333	11	–	19	.367
Nevada	5	–	13	.278	11	–	19	.367
Air Force	2	–	16	.111	4	–	25	.138
† 2017 MW Tournament winner Rankings from AP poll

The 2016–17 San Diego State Aztecs women's basketball team represented San Diego State University in the 2016–17 NCAA Division I women's basketball season. The Aztecs, led by fourth year head coach Stacie Terry, played their home games at Viejas Arena and were members of the Mountain West Conference. They finished the season 11–19, 6–12 in Mountain West play to finish in ninth place. They lost in the first round of the Mountain West women's tournament to San Jose State.

== Roster ==
2016–17 San Diego State Aztecs women's basketball team
Players
Coaches

Pos.	#	Name	Height	Year	Previous school	Hometown
G/F	1	Khalia Lark (I) (redshirt)	6 ft 0 in (1.83 m)	Jr	Mater Dei; Washington	Irvine, CA
G	3	Ariell Bostick	5 ft 4 in (1.63 m)	Sr	Bishop O' Dowd HS	Oakland, CA
G	4	Kymberly Ellison	5 ft 7 in (1.7 m)	RS Sr	Hardaway HS; Georgia Tech	Columbus, GA
F	11	Arantxa Gomez Ferrer	6 ft 0 in (1.83 m)	So	Parque Colegio Santa Ana HS	Valencia, Spain
G	13	Allison Brown	5 ft 7 in (1.7 m)	Jr	Mater Dei HS	Anaheim Hills, CA
G	15	McKynzie Fort	5 ft 9 in (1.75 m)	Jr	Etiwanda HS	Fontana, CA
G	20	Geena Gomez	5 ft 8 in (1.73 m)	RS Jr	Edison HS; Saint Joseph's	Huntington Beach, CA
G	21	Abby Lowe	5 ft 11 in (1.8 m)	Fr	Barking Abbey School	Stockport, England
G/F	22	Lexy Thorderson	6 ft 0 in (1.83 m)	Jr	Rock Canyon HS	Castle Rock, CO
G	30	Cheyenne Greenhouse	5 ft 11 in (1.8 m)	Jr	Canyon Springs HS	Riverside, CA
F	34	Baylee Vanderdoes	6 ft 1 in (1.85 m)	Fr	Placer HS	Auburn, CA
F	40	Monique Terry	6 ft 2 in (1.88 m)	Fr	Brennan HS	San Antonio, TX
F	44	Aleiah Brandon	6 ft 1 in (1.85 m)	RS Sr	Centennial HS	Corona, CA
C	45	Naomi Ekwedike	6 ft 6 in (1.98 m)	Fr	Potters House Christian Academy	Lagos, Nigeria

Head coach

- Stacie Terry (UT Arlington)

Assistant coach(es)

- Jesse Clark (Pacific Union)
- Ciara Carl (Point Loma)
- Nick Grant (Baylor)

Legend

- (C) Team captain
- (S) Suspended
- (I) Ineligible
- (W) Walk-on
- Injured
- Current redshirt

Roster

== Schedule ==
Date time, TV	Rank^{#}	Opponent^{#}	Result	Record	Site (attendance) city, state
Exhibition
11/04/2016*; 6:30 pm		Cal State San Marcos	W 74–53		Viejas Arena (276); San Diego, CA
Non-conference regular season
11/11/2016*; 5:00 pm		at UC Riverside	L 44–72	0–1	The SRC (263); Riverside, CA
12/14/2016*; 6:30 pm		San Diego Christian	W 80–70	1–1	Viejas Arena (360); San Diego, CA
11/17/2016*; 6:00 pm		at San Diego	L 53–91	1–2	Jenny Craig Pavilion (482); San Diego, CA
11/20/2016*; 2:00 pm		Loyola Marymount	L 53–60	1–3	Viejas Arena (512); San Diego, CA
11/26/2016*; 9:00 am		vs. Texas–Arlington; SHU Thanksgiving Classic semifinals	L 58–64	1–4	Walsh Gymnasium (311); South Orange, NJ
11/27/2016*; 9:00 am		vs. Central Connecticut; SHU Thanksgiving Classic 3rd place game	W 80–62	2–4	Walsh Gymnaisum (321); South Orange, NJ
12/02/2016*; 7:00 pm		at UC Davis	L 55–75	2–5	The Pavilion (424); Davis, CA
12/09/2016*; 12:00 pm		Michigan	L 57–92	2–6	Viejas Arena (2,632); San Diego, CA
12/11/2016*; 2:00 pm		UC Santa Barbara	W 84–70	3–6	Viejas Arena (460); San Diego, CA
12/22/2016*; 5:00 pm		at Cal State Fullerton	W 71–61	4–6	Titan Gym; Fullerton, CA
12/28/2016*; 6:30 pm		Biola	W 63–48	5–6	Viejas Arena (512); San Diego, CA
Mountain West regular season
12/31/2016; 1:00 pm		at New Mexico	L 42–85	5–7 (0–1)	The Pit (4,303); Albuquerque, NM
01/04/2017; 6:30 pm		Nevada	W 83–78	6–7 (1–1)	Viejas Arena (364); San Diego, CA
01/07/2017; 2:00 pm		Boise State	W 84–77	7–7 (2–1)	Viejas Arena (714); San Diego, CA
01/11/2017; 7:00 pm		at San Jose State	L 80–81	7–8 (2–2)	Event Center Arena (536); San Jose, CA
01/14/2017; 1:00 pm		at Utah State	L 47–53	7–9 (2–3)	Smith Spectrum (612); Logan, UT
01/18/2017; 6:30 pm		UNLV	W 87–68	8–9 (3–3)	Viejas Arena (1,086); San Diego, CA
01/25/2017; 6:30 pm		Air Force	L 59–62	8–10 (3–4)	Viejas Arena (1,023); San Diego, CA
01/28/2017; 1:00 pm		at Colorado State	L 43–60	8–11 (3–5)	Moby Arena (1,687); Fort Collins, CO
02/01/2017; 5:30 pm		at Wyoming	L 67–80	8–12 (3–6)	Arena-Auditorium (2,031); Laramie, WY
02/04/2017; 2:00 pm		Fresno State	L 51–59	8–13 (3–7)	Viejas Arena (875); San Diego, CA
02/08/2017; 6:30 pm		San Jose State	L 90–99	8–14 (3–8)	Viejas Arena (338); San Diego, CA
02/11/2017; 4:00 pm		at Nevada	L 65–88	8–15 (3–9)	Lawlor Events Center (1,332); Reno, NV
02/15/2017; 6:30 pm		Utah State	W 66–59	9–15 (4–9)	Viejas Arena (464); San Diego, CA
02/18/2017; 4:00 pm		at UNLV	L 62–80	9–16 (4–10)	Cox Pavilion (1,585); Paradise, NV
02/22/2017; 7:00 pm		at Fresno State	L 50–59	9–17 (4–11)	Save Mart Center (2,121); Laramie, WY
02/25/2017; 2:00 pm		Colorado State	L 46–80	9–18 (4–12)	Viejas Arena (910); San Diego, CA
02/28/2017; 6:00 pm		at Air Force	W 64–51	10–18 (5–12)	Clune Arena (356); Colorado Springs, CO
03/03/2017; 6:30 pm		New Mexico	W 63–51	11-18 (6-12)	Viejas Arena (1,474); San Diego, CA
Mountain West Women's Tournament
03/06/2016; 2:00 pm	(9)	vs. (8) San Jose State; First Round	W 76-58	11-19	Thomas & Mack Center (521); Paradise, NV
*Non-conference game. ^{#}Rankings from AP Poll. (#) Tournament seedings in parentheses. All times are in Pacific Time.

== See also ==
2016–17 San Diego State Aztecs men's basketball team
