= 2016–17 Nevada Wolf Pack women's basketball team =

Intercollegiate basketball season

2016–17 Nevada Wolf Pack women's basketball
- Conference: Mountain West Conference
- Record: 11–19 (5–13 MW)
- Head coach: Jane Albright (10th season)
- Assistant coaches: Camille Williams; Kami Malnaa; Janet Butler
- Home arena: Lawlor Events Center

2016–17 Mountain West Conference women's basketball standings
	Conf.				Overall
Team	W		L	PCT	W		L	PCT
Colorado State	15	–	3	.833	25	–	9	.735
Wyoming	13	–	5	.722	22	–	10	.688
Boise State†	12	–	6	.667	25	–	8	.758
UNLV	12	–	6	.667	22	–	11	.667
New Mexico	10	–	8	.556	15	–	15	.500
Utah State	9	–	9	.500	17	–	14	.548
Fresno State	8	–	10	.444	18	–	15	.545
San Jose State	7	–	11	.389	11	–	21	.344
San Diego State	6	–	12	.333	11	–	19	.367
Nevada	5	–	13	.278	11	–	19	.367
Air Force	2	–	16	.111	4	–	25	.138
† 2017 MW Tournament winner Rankings from AP poll

The 2016–17 Nevada Wolf Pack women's basketball team represented the University of Nevada, Reno during the 2016–17 NCAA Division I women's basketball season. The Wolf Pack, led by tenth year head coach Jane Albright, played their home games at the Lawlor Events Center and were members of the Mountain West Conference. They finished the season 11–19, 5–13 in Mountain West play to finish in eleventh place. They lost in the first round of the Mountain West women's tournament to Utah State.

== Roster ==
2016–17 Nevada Wolf Pack women's basketball team
Players
Coaches

Pos.	#	Name	Height	Year	Previous school	Hometown
G	1	Ashlee Jones	5 ft 9 in (1.75 m)	RS Jr	Bradshaw Christian HS	Sacramento, CA
F	3	Teige Zeller	6 ft 2 in (1.88 m)	Jr	Los Lunas HS	Los Lunas, NM
G	4	Halie Bergman	5 ft 10 in (1.78 m)	RS Jr	Turlock HS; Pacific	Turlock, CA
F	11	Terae Briggs	6 ft 3 in (1.91 m)	So	Pleanty Coups HS; United Tribes Technical College	Pryor, MT
G	12	MorningRose Tobey	5 ft 7 in (1.7 m)	So	Billings West HS	Billings, MT
G	13	T Moe	5 ft 8 in (1.73 m)	RS Jr	Terra Nova HS	Daly City, CA
G	15	Stephanie Schmid	5 ft 10 in (1.78 m)	Sr	Lake Zurich HS; Arizona Western College	Lake Zurich, IL
G	22	Sami Dinan	5 ft 5 in (1.65 m)	Fr	North Valleys HS	Reno, NV
G	23	Desirae Gonzalez	5 ft 11 in (1.8 m)	Fr	Kingman HS	Kingman, AZ
G	24	Camariah King	5 ft 6 in (1.68 m)	So	Holy Names Academy	Seattle, WA
F	32	A. J. Cephas	6 ft 0 in (1.83 m)	RS So	Deer Valley HS	Antioch, CA
G	34	Jade Redmon	5 ft 7 in (1.7 m)	Jr	Mead HS; Eastern Washington	Spokane, WA
F	35	Kristin Dearth (I) (redshirt)	6 ft 3 in (1.91 m)	So	Cibola; Seattle	Corrales, NM
G	44	Riana Everidge	6 ft 1 in (1.85 m)	So	Park Hill HS	Kansas City, MO

Head coach

- Jane Albright (Wichita State)

Assistant coach(es)

- Camille Williams (UC Santa Barbara)
- Kami Malnaa (Montana State Billings)
- Janet Butler (Nevada)

Legend

- (C) Team captain
- (S) Suspended
- (I) Ineligible
- (W) Walk-on
- Injured
- Current redshirt

Roster

== Schedule ==
Date time, TV	Rank^{#}	Opponent^{#}	Result	Record	Site (attendance) city, state
Exhibition
11/05/2016*; 4:00 pm		Cal State Stanislaus	W 91–77		Lawlor Events Center (672); Reno, NV
Non-conference regular season
11/11/2016*; 6:30 pm		Long Beach State	L 93–97	0–1	Lawlor Events Center (1,388); Reno, NV
11/13/2016*; 2:00 pm		Portland	W 72–59	1–1	Lawlor Events Center (859); Reno, NV
11/16/2016*; 7:00 pm		at Sacramento State	W 99–95	2–1	Hornets Nest (332); Sacramento, CA
11/20/2016*; 1:00 pm		at Pepperdine	W 69–60	3–1	Firestone Fieldhouse (271); Malibu, CA
11/25/2016*; 2:00 pm		Navy; Nugget Classic semifinals	L 62–79	3–2	Lawlor Events Center (1,662); Reno, NV
11/26/2016*; 2:00 pm		Memphis; Nugget Classic 3rd place game	W 75–67	4–2	Lawlor Events Center (838); Reno, NV
12/01/2016*; 6:30 pm		UC Irvine	L 59–72	4–3	Lawlor Events Center (845); Reno, NV
12/06/2016*; 6:30 pm		Utah	L 50–80	4–4	Lawlor Events Center (893); Reno, NV
12/10/2016*; 2:00 pm		at San Diego	L 54–70	4–5	Jenny Craig Pavilion (403); San Diego, CA
12/13/2016*; 11:00 am		Holy Names	W 70–42	5–5	Lawlor Events Center (4,801); Reno, NV
12/18/2016*; 2:00 pm		Hawaii	W 67–59 ^{3OT}	6–5	Lawlor Events Center (1,157); Reno, NV
Mountain West regular season
12/29/2016; 7:00 pm		at San Jose State	L 84–107	6–6 (0–1)	Event Center Arena (424); San Jose, CA
12/31/2016; 2:00 pm		Fresno State	L 70–71	6–7 (0–2)	Lawlor Events Center (975); Reno, NV
01/04/2017; 6:30 pm		at San Diego State	L 78–83	6–8 (0–3)	Viejas Arena (364); San Diego, CA
01/07/2017; 4:00 pm		New Mexico	L 63–69	6–9 (0–4)	Lawlor Events Center (1,032); Reno, NV
01/14/2017; 4:00 pm		Wyoming	L 59–72	6–10 (0–5)	Lawlor Events Center (1,021); Reno, NV
01/18/2017; 6:00 pm		at Air Force	W 56–51	7–10 (1–5)	Clune Arena (345); Colorado Springs, CO
01/21/2017; 2:00 pm		at Fresno State	L 54–68	7–11 (1–6)	Save Mart Center (1,897); Fresno, CA
01/25/2017; 6:30 pm		Boise State	W 69–62	8–11 (2–6)	Lawlor Events Center (1,043); Reno, NV
01/28/2017; 6:00 pm		at New Mexico	L 50–59	8–12 (2–7)	The Pit (3,126); Albuquerque, NM
02/01/2017; 6:30 pm		Utah State	L 69-81	8–13 (2–8)	Lawlor Events Center (1,031); Reno, NV
02/08/2017; 6:00 pm		at UNLV	L 41–60	8–14 (2–9)	Cox Pavilion (1,002); Paradise, NV
02/11/2017; 4:00 pm		San Diego State	W 88–65	9–14 (3–9)	Lawlor Events Center (1,332); Reno, NV
02/15/2017; 6:30 pm		Air Force	W 65–58	10–14 (4–9)	Lawlor Events Center (824); Reno, NV
02/18/2017; 1:00 pm		at Utah State	L 57–60	10–15 (4–10)	Smith Spectrum (595); Logan, UT
02/22/2017; 6:00 pm		at Boise State	L 74–77	10–16 (4–11)	Taco Bell Arena (769); Boise, ID
02/25/2017; 4:00 pm		UNLV	L 49–64	10–17 (4–12)	Lawlor Events Center (2,331); Reno, NV
02/28/2017; 6:30 pm		San Jose State	W 108–85	11–17 (5–12)	Lawlor Events Center (920); Reno, NV
03/03/2017; 6:00 pm		at Colorado State	L 51–64	11–18 (5–13)	Moby Arena (2,243); Fort Collins, CO
Mountain West Women's Tournament
03/06/2017; 4:30 pm, MWN	(10)	vs. (7) Fresno State; First Round	L 57-62	11-19	Thomas & Mack Center; Paradise, NV
*Non-conference game. ^{#}Rankings from AP Poll. (#) Tournament seedings in parentheses. All times are in Pacific Time.

== See also ==
- 2016–17 Nevada Wolf Pack men's basketball team
