= 2016–17 San Jose State Spartans women's basketball team =

Intercollegiate basketball season

2016–17 San Jose State Spartans women's basketball
- Conference: Mountain West Conference
- Record: 11–21 (7–11 Mountain West)
- Head coach: Jamie Craighead (4th season)
- Assistant coaches: Dan Muscatell; Jourdan Willard; Alle Moreno
- Home arena: Event Center Arena

2016–17 Mountain West Conference women's basketball standings
	Conf.				Overall
Team	W		L	PCT	W		L	PCT
Colorado State	15	–	3	.833	25	–	9	.735
Wyoming	13	–	5	.722	22	–	10	.688
Boise State†	12	–	6	.667	25	–	8	.758
UNLV	12	–	6	.667	22	–	11	.667
New Mexico	10	–	8	.556	15	–	15	.500
Utah State	9	–	9	.500	17	–	14	.548
Fresno State	8	–	10	.444	18	–	15	.545
San Jose State	7	–	11	.389	11	–	21	.344
San Diego State	6	–	12	.333	11	–	19	.367
Nevada	5	–	13	.278	11	–	19	.367
Air Force	2	–	16	.111	4	–	25	.138
† 2017 MW Tournament winner Rankings from AP poll

The 2016–17 San Jose State Spartans women's basketball team represented San José State University during the 2016–17 NCAA Division I women's basketball season. The Spartans, led by fourth year head coach Jamie Craighead, played their home games at the Event Center Arena as members of the Mountain West Conference. They finished the season 11–21, 7–11 in Mountain West play to finish in eighth place. They advanced to the quarterfinals of the Mountain West women's tournament where they lost to Colorado State.

== Roster ==
2016–17 San Jose State Spartans women's basketball team
Players
Coaches

Pos.	#	Name	Height	Year	Previous school	Hometown
G	1	Myzhanique Ladd	5 ft 8 in (1.73 m)	Jr	Cleveland HS	Seattle, WA
G	2	Andrea Kohlhaas	5 ft 10 in (1.78 m)	So	Otto-Hahn-Gymnasium	Besigheim, Germany
F	3	Paris Baird	6 ft 2 in (1.88 m)	RS Sr	Windward School	Van Nuys, CA
G	4	Fieme'a Hafoka	5 ft 9 in (1.75 m)	Fr	Lahainaluna HS	Lahaina, HI
G	5	Analyss Benally	5 ft 9 in (1.75 m)	Fr	Wichita Heights HS	Park City, KS
F	11	Jasmine Smith (C)	6 ft 0 in (1.83 m)	Sr	Bellarmine-Jefferson HS	Burbank, CA
F	12	Anna Thomasdotter (injured) (redshirt)	6 ft 0 in (1.83 m)	Fr	Katedralskolan	Lund, Sweden
G	20	Rachol West	5 ft 10 in (1.78 m)	Sr	Garces Memorial HS	Bakersfield, CA
G	21	Dezz Ramos	5 ft 7 in (1.7 m)	RS Sr	Hunter HS; Weber State	West Valley, UT
F	23	Hallie Gennett	5 ft 11 in (1.8 m)	RS Jr	Post Falls HS; Sacramento State	Post Falls, ID
C	24	Alexis Harris	6 ft 3 in (1.91 m)	Fr	Palo Alto HS	Palo Alto, CA
G	30	Taylor Turney	5 ft 8 in (1.73 m)	Fr	Foothill HS	Henderson, NV

Head coach

- Jamie Craighead (Oregon)

Assistant coach(es)

- Dan Muscatell (Western Washington)
- Jourdan Willard (Sacramento State)
- Alle Moreno (Sacramento State)

Legend

- (C) Team captain
- (S) Suspended
- (I) Ineligible
- (W) Walk-on
- Injured
- Current redshirt

Roster

== Schedule ==
Date time, TV	Rank^{#}	Opponent^{#}	Result	Record	Site (attendance) city, state
Exhibition
11/01/2016*; 5:00 pm		Sonoma State	W 105–71		Event Center Arena; San Jose, CA
Non-conference regular season
11/11/2016*; 4:30 pm		at New Mexico State	L 55–66	0–1	Pan American Center (715); Las Cruces, NM
11/13/2016*; 1:00 pm		at No. 18 Arizona State	L 37–82	0–2	Wells Fargo Arena (1,380); Tempe, AZ
11/18/2016*; 7:00 pm		Pacific	L 96–99 ^{OT}	0–3	Event Center Arena (392); San Jose, CA
11/20/2016*; 2:00 pm		Santa Clara; Clash of the County	W 65–54	1–3	Event Center Arena (316); San Jose, CA
11/25/2016*; 7:30 pm		at Hawaii; Rainbow Wahine Shootout	W 77–61	2–3	Stan Sheriff Center (5,838); Honolulu, HI
11/26/2016*; 5:00 pm		vs. No. 7 Mississippi State; Rainbow Wahine Shootout	L 51–88	2–4	Stan Sheriff Center; Honolulu, HI
11/27/2016*; 4:00 pm		vs. Oregon; Rainbow Wahine Shootout	L 62–91	2–5	Stan Sheriff Center; Honolulu, HI
12/03/2016*; 4:30 pm		Saint Mary's	L 64–85	2–6	Event Center Arena (653); San Jose, CA
12/06/2016*; 7:00 pm		at San Francisco	L 71–79	2–7	Kezar Pavilion (541); San Francisco, CA
12/09/2016*; 5:00 pm		at Nebraska	L 61–83	2–8	Pinnacle Bank Arena (4,205); Lincoln, NE
12/11/2016*; 11:00 am		at South Dakota	L 69–84	2–9	Sanford Coyote Sports Center (1,601); Vermillion, SD
12/18/2016*; 4:30 pm		Stanislaus State	W 90–85	3–9	Event Center Arena (1,452); San Jose, CA
Mountain West regular season
12/29/2016; 7:00 pm		Nevada	W 107–84	4–9 (1–0)	Event Center Arena (424); San Jose, CA
01/04/2017; 6:00 pm		at Colorado State	L 67–70	4–10 (1–1)	Moby Arena (681); Fort Collins, CO
01/07/2017; 2:00 pm		at Fresno State	L 74–88	4–11 (1–2)	Save Mart Center (2,044); Fresno, CA
01/11/2017; 7:00 pm		San Diego State	W 81–80	5–11 (2–2)	Save Mart Center (469); Fresno, CA
01/14/2017; 2:00 pm		Air Force	W 86–74	6–11 (3–2)	Event Center Arena (526); San Jose, CA
01/18/2017; 5:30 pm		at Wyoming	W 89–60	6–12 (3–3)	Arena-Auditorium (2,218); Laramie, WY
01/21/2017; 1:00 pm		at Boise State	W 86–64	6–13 (3–4)	Taco Bell Arena (536); Boise, ID
01/25/2017; 7:00 pm		Colorado State	W 68–56	6–14 (3–5)	Event Center Arena (432); San Jose, CA
01/28/2017; 4:00 pm		at UNLV	W 76–65	7–14 (4–5)	Cox Pavilion (423); Paradise, NV
02/04/2017; 2:00 pm		New Mexico	W 82–72	7–15 (4–6)	Event Center Arena; San Jose, CA
02/08/2017; 6:30 pm		at San Diego State	W 99–90	8–15 (5–6)	Viejas Arena (338); San Diego, CA
02/11/2017; 2:00 pm		UNLV	L 55–63	8–16 (5–7)	Event Center Arena (267); San Jose, CA
02/15/2017; 7:00 pm		Fresno State	W 77–68 ^{OT}	9–16 (6–7)	Event Center Arena (618); San Jose, CA
02/18/2017; 3:00 pm		at Air Force	W 83–67	10–16 (7–7)	Clune Arena (356); Colorado Springs, CO
02/22/2017; 6:00 pm		at Utah State	L 78–82	10–17 (7–8)	Smith Spectrum (370); Logan, UT
02/25/2017; 2:00 pm		Boise State	L 61–69	10–18 (7–9)	Event Center Arena (1,342); San Jose, CA
02/28/2017; 6:30 pm		at Nevada	L 85–108	10–19 (7–10)	Lawlor Events Center (920); Reno, NV
03/03/2017; 7:00 pm		Wyoming	W 66–58	10–20 (7–11)	Event Center Arena (763); San Jose, CA
Mountain West tournament
03/06/2017; 2:00 pm	(8)	vs. (9) San Diego State; First Round	W 76–58	11-20	Thomas & Mack Center (521); Paradise, NV
03/07/2017; 1:00 pm	(8)	vs. (1) Colorado State; Quarterfinals	L 60–65	11–21	Thomas & Mack Center; Paradise, NV
*Non-conference game. ^{#}Rankings from AP Poll. (#) Tournament seedings in parentheses. All times are in Pacific Time.

== See also ==
2016–17 San Jose State Spartans men's basketball team
