= 2016–17 Fresno State Bulldogs women's basketball team =

Intercollegiate basketball season

2016–17 Fresno State Bulldogs women's basketball

LMU Thanksgiving Classic Champions
- Conference: Mountain West Conference
- Record: 18–15 (8–10 Mountain West)
- Head coach: Jaime White (3rd season)
- Assistant coaches: Mandi Carver; Laura Dinkins; Tom Perkins
- Home arena: Save Mart Center

2016–17 Mountain West Conference women's basketball standings
	Conf.				Overall
Team	W		L	PCT	W		L	PCT
Colorado State	15	–	3	.833	25	–	9	.735
Wyoming	13	–	5	.722	22	–	10	.688
Boise State†	12	–	6	.667	25	–	8	.758
UNLV	12	–	6	.667	22	–	11	.667
New Mexico	10	–	8	.556	15	–	15	.500
Utah State	9	–	9	.500	17	–	14	.548
Fresno State	8	–	10	.444	18	–	15	.545
San Jose State	7	–	11	.389	11	–	21	.344
San Diego State	6	–	12	.333	11	–	19	.367
Nevada	5	–	13	.278	11	–	19	.367
Air Force	2	–	16	.111	4	–	25	.138
† 2017 MW Tournament winner Rankings from AP poll

The 2016–17 Fresno State Bulldogs women's basketball team represented California State University, Fresno during the 2016–17 NCAA Division I women's basketball season. The Bulldogs, led by third year head coach Jaime White, played their home games at the Save Mart Center and are members of the Mountain West Conference. They finished the season 18–15 overall, 8–10 in Mountain West play to finish in seventh place. As the No. 7 seed in the MW Tournament, they advanced to the championship game, where they lost to Boise State.

== Roster ==
2016–17 Fresno State Bulldogs women's basketball team
Players
Coaches

Pos.	#	Name	Height	Year	Previous school	Hometown
G	2	Raven Johnson	5 ft 11 in (1.8 m)	So	Skyline	Dallas, TX
G	3	Tory Jacobs	5 ft 10 in (1.78 m)	RS So	MacArthur; Minnesota	Dallas, TX
C	4	Bego Faz Davalos	6 ft 3 in (1.91 m)	RS So	Tecnologico De Monterrey	Monterrey, Mexico
C	5	Katelin Noyer	6 ft 4 in (1.93 m)	Fr	Westlake Girls	Auckland, New Zealand
G	10	Candace White	5 ft 8 in (1.73 m)	So	Modesto Christian	Modesto, CA
F/C	13	Anais Kirvan	6 ft 2 in (1.88 m)	Sr	Burwood; Vincennes	Ashfield, Australia
F	14	Jordanna Porter (I) (redshirt)	5 ft 11 in (1.8 m)	So	Ellison; Utah	Killeen, TX
G	20	Emilie Volk	5 ft 11 in (1.8 m)	Sr	Bonnieville	Ogden, UT
F	21	Kendra Martin	5 ft 11 in (1.8 m)	Sr	South; Chipola College	Denver, CO
G	22	Zaria Branch	5 ft 10 in (1.78 m)	So	Mt. Miguel	San Diego, CA
G	23	Breanne Knishka	5 ft 10 in (1.78 m)	So	Cashmere	Dryden, WA
G	24	Saraya Smith	6 ft 0 in (1.83 m)	Fr	Ponderosa	El Dorado Hills, CA
G/F	30	Kristina Cavey	6 ft 0 in (1.83 m)	Fr	Berthoud	Berthoud, CO
F/C	32	Sharae Chalmers	6 ft 2 in (1.88 m)	Fr	Nimitz	Irving, TX
F	33	Megan Nilsson	6 ft 2 in (1.88 m)	Fr	Mt. Spokane	Colbert, WA

Head coach

- Jaime White (Southern Utah)

Assistant coach(es)

- Mandi Carver (Idaho State)
- Laura Dinkins (Northern Arizona)
- Tom Perkins (Utah)

Legend

- (C) Team captain
- (S) Suspended
- (I) Ineligible
- (W) Walk-on
- Injured
- Current redshirt

Roster

== Schedule ==
Date time, TV	Rank^{#}	Opponent^{#}	Result	Record	Site (attendance) city, state
Exitbition
11/04/2016*; 5:00 pm		Azusa Pacific	W 75–47		Save Mart Center (1,587); Fresno, CA
Non-conference regular season
11/11/2016*; 5:00 pm		Biola	W 71–50	1–0	Save Mart Center (2,048); Fresno, CA
11/15/2016*; 7:00 pm		Utah	L 55–65	1–1	Save Mart Center (1,887); Fresno, CA
11/18/2016*; 7:00 pm		Cal State Northridge	L 57–61	1–2	Save Mart Center (1,992); Fresno, CA
11/25/2016*; 12:00 pm		vs. Belmont; LMU Thanksgiving Classic	W 62–53	2–2	Gersten Pavilion (289); Los Angeles, CA
11/26/2016*; 1:00 pm		vs. UC Irvine; LMU Thanksgiving Classic	W 63–45	3–2	Gersten Pavilion (250); Los Angeles, CA
11/30/2016*; 7:00 pm		San Francisco	W 61–48	4–2	Save Mart Center (5,147); Fresno, CA
12/02/2016*; 2:00 pm		at No. 13 Washington	L 54–85	4–3	Alaska Airlines Arena; Seattle, WA
12/07/2016*; 7:00 pm		Cal State Dominguez Hills	W 73–60	5–3	Save Mart Center (1,924); Fresno, CA
12/10/2016*; 5:00 pm		at Pacific	W 74–67	6–3	Stockton Arena; Stockton, CA
12/16/2016*; 7:00 pm		UC Santa Barbara	L 49–50	6–4	Save Mart Center (2,190); Fresno, CA
12/19/2016*; 11:00 am		at Weber State	W 60–57	7–4	Dee Events Center (3,651); Ogden, UT
Mountain West regular season
12/29/2016; 7:00 pm		New Mexico	L 54–80	7–5 (0–1)	Save Mart Center (2,042); Fresno, CA
12/31/2016; 2:00 pm		at Nevada	W 71–70	8–5 (1–1)	Lawlor Events Center (975); Reno, NV
01/04/2017; 5:30 pm		at Wyoming	L 48–70	8–6 (1–2)	Arena-Auditorium (2,054); Laramie, WY
01/07/2017; 2:00 pm		San Jose State	W 88–74	9–6 (2–2)	Save Mart Center (2,044); Fresno, CA
01/11/2017; 7:00 pm		Air Force	W 63–40	10–6 (3–2)	Save Mart Center (2,276); Fresno, CA
01/14/2017; 1:00 pm		at Boise State	L 66–67	10–7 (3–3)	Taco Bell Arena (536); Boise, ID
01/18/2017; 6:00 pm		at Colorado State	L 56–73	10–8 (3–4)	Moby Arena (1,243); Fort Collins, CO
01/21/2016; 2:00 pm		Nevada	W 68–54	11–8 (4–4)	Save Mart Center (2,301); Fresno, CA
01/28/2017; 2:00 pm		Utah State	L 47–52	11–9 (4–5)	Save Mart Center (2,042); Fresno, CA
02/01/2017; 6:00 pm		at Air Force	W 72–56	12–9 (5–5)	Clune Arena (542); Colorado Springs, CO
02/04/2017; 2:00 pm		at San Diego State	W 59–51	13–9 (6–5)	Viejas Arena (875); San Diego, CA
02/08/2017; 7:00 pm		Wyoming	W 52–47	14–9 (7–5)	Save Mart Center (2,035); Fresno, CA
02/11/2017; 2:00 pm		Colorado State	W 66–64 ^{OT}	14–10 (7–6)	Save Mart Center (2,165); Fresno, CA
02/15/2017; 7:00 pm		at San Jose State	L 68–77	14–11 (7–7)	Event Center Arena (618); San Jose, CA
02/18/2017; 1:00 pm		at New Mexico	L 57–66	14–12 (7–8)	The Pit (4,895); Albuquerque, NM
02/22/2017; 7:00 pm		San Diego State	W 59–50	15–12 (8–8)	Save Mart Center (2,121); Fresno, CA
02/28/2017; 7:00 pm		Boise State	L 48–66	15–13 (8–9)	Save Mart Center (2,090); Fresno, CA
03/03/2017; 6:00 pm		at UNLV	L 38–54	15-14 (8-10)	Cox Pavilion (1,531); Paradise, NV
Mountain West tournament
03/06/2017; 4:30 pm	(7)	vs. (10) Nevada; First round	W 62–57	16–14	Thomas & Mack Center (1,414); Paradise, NV
03/07/2017; 6:00 pm	(7)	vs. (2) Wyoming; Quarterfinals	W 58–48	17–14	Thomas & Mack Center (1,642); Paradise, NV
03/08/2017; 9:00 pm	(7)	at (3) UNLV; Semifinals	W 53–51	18–14	Thomas & Mack Center (1,670); Paradise, NV
03/10/2017; 12:00 pm	(7)	vs. (4) Boise State; Championship game	L 53–66	18–15	Thomas & Mack Center; Paradise, NV
*Non-conference game. ^{#}Rankings from AP Poll. (#) Tournament seedings in parentheses. All times are in Pacific Time.

== See also ==
2016–17 Fresno State Bulldogs men's basketball team
