= Jane Albright =

American basketball coach

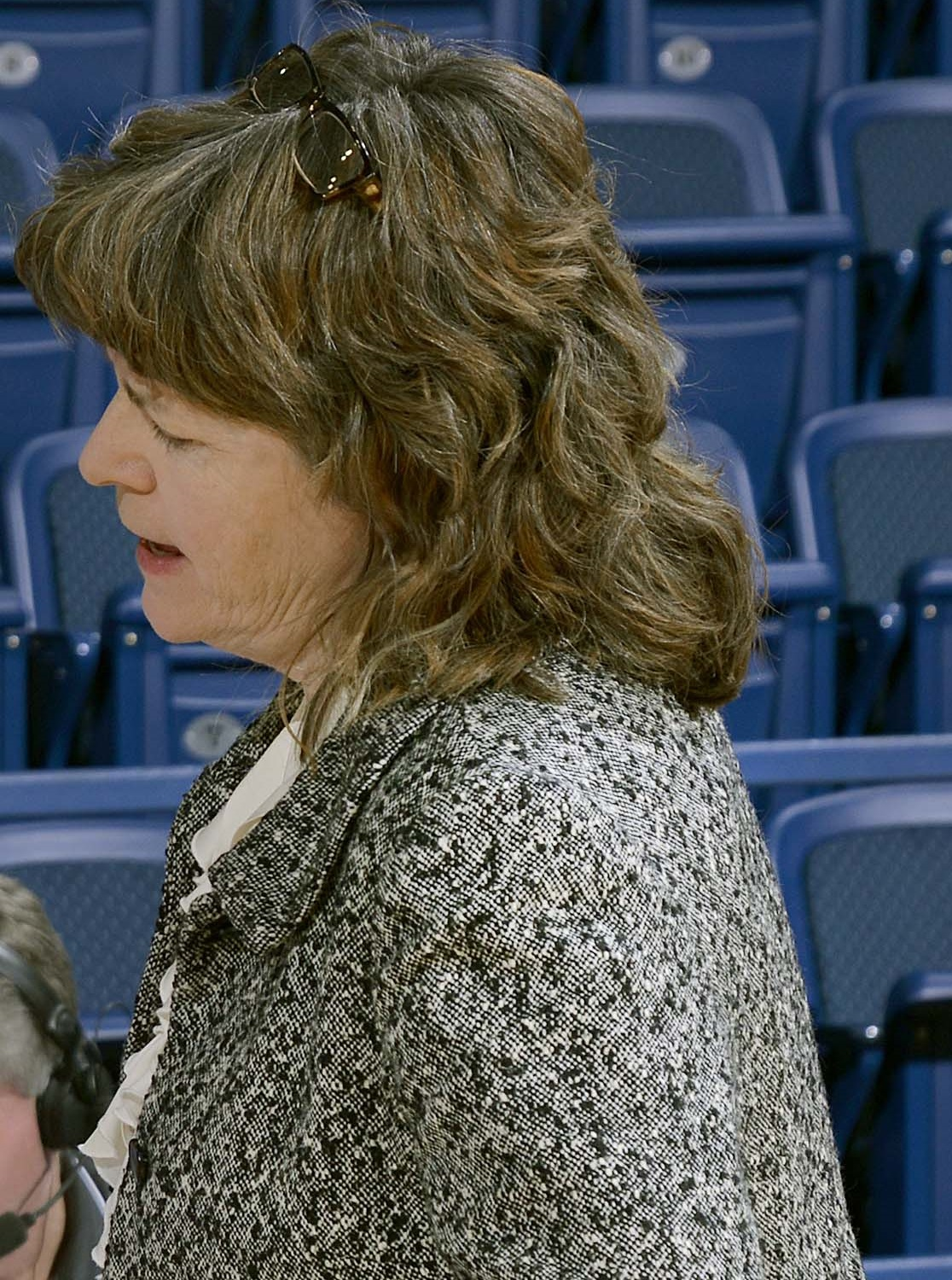
- Albright in 2016

Biographical details
- Born: Graham, North Carolina, U.S.

Playing career
- 1973–1977: Appalachian State
- Position: Forward

Coaching career (HC unless noted)
- 1977–1981: Spartanburg HS
- 1981–1983: Tennessee (grad. asst.)
- 1983–1984: Cincinnati (asst.)
- 1984–1994: Northern Illinois
- 1994–2003: Wisconsin
- 2003–2008: Wichita State
- 2008–2017: Nevada

Head coaching record
- Overall: 512–477
- Tournaments: 4–9 (NCAA); 10–3 (WNIT)

Accomplishments and honors

Championships
- WNIT (2000); 2× North Star Conference Tournament (1990, 1992); Mid-Continent Conference tournament (1993)

Awards
- Carol Eckman Award (2014); Big Ten Coach of the Year (1995); Mid-Continent Coach of the Year (1993); North Star Coach of the Year (1989)

Jane Gibson Albright is an American women's college basketball coach who was most recently head coach at Nevada from 2008 to 2017. Albright was previously head coach at Northern Illinois from 1984 to 1994, Wisconsin from 1994 to 2003, and Wichita State from 2003 to 2008.

== Early life and education ==
Born and raised in Graham, North Carolina, Albright graduated from Graham High School in 1973 and Appalachian State University in 1977 cum laude with a bachelor's degree in health and physical education. At Appalachian State, Albright played basketball and volleyball.

== Coaching career ==
Albright began her career as the girls' varsity basketball coach at Spartanburg High School in Spartanburg, South Carolina in 1977. The team went 3–18 in Albright's first year, then improved to 11–10 in 1978–79, 16–13 in 1979–80, and 20–7 in 1980–81 and made the playoffs in 1980 and 1981.

From 1981 to 1983, Albright was a graduate assistant at Tennessee under Pat Summitt. Albright then was an assistant coach at Cincinnati for the 1983–84 season.

From 1984 to 1994, Albright was the head coach at Northern Illinois University and helped the Lady Huskies to become a nationally recognized program. She had a record of 188–110 in her 11 years at NIU as the Lady Huskies made the NCAA tournament four times in five years.

From 1994 to 2003, she coached at the Wisconsin where she compiled a 161–107 record with five NCAA tournament and two WNIT appearances. The two WNIT appearances were back to back, in 1999 as runners-up and 2000 as champions. For the first time in program history, Wisconsin reached the top 10 in both the AP and coaches' polls during the 2001–02 season. Following a 7–21 season in 2002–03, Albright resigned on February 25, 2003, with one year remaining on her contract and Wisconsin declining to sign her to a long-term contract extension.

After nine seasons at Wisconsin, Albright was head coach at Wichita State from 2003 to 2008, where she went 48–95. Her best season was in 2005–06 with a 15–13 record, the only winning season during her five seasons there.

Albright was head coach at Nevada from 2008 to 2017, with a 115–165 overall record with two WNIT appearances in 2010 and 2011. Nevada had its first 20-win season in 2010–11 with a 22–11 record that included regular season wins over Power Five opponents NC State and Arizona and the program's first WNIT victory, over Saint Mary's. However, Nevada went only 7–23 in 2011–12, its final season in the Western Athletic Conference.

In 2012, Nevada moved to the Mountain West Conference (MW). Nevada had only one winning season after that, the 2013–14 season with an 18–13 (12–6 MW) record. On March 1, 2017, Albright retired from Nevada, following an 11–19 season.

=== USA Basketball ===
Albright served as the assistant coach for the team representing the United States at the World University Games held in Buffalo, New York in July 1993. The USA team defeated teams from Israel, Taiwan, Ukraine, and Russia. They were defeated by Cuba 88–80 and by China 75–73. The USA team defeated Lithuania 83–73 to earn the bronze medal.

In 1996, Albright was head coach of a U.S. squad of players chosen after the Olympic team that won the gold medal in the William Jones Cup.

== Head coaching record ==
Record table
Season	Team	Overall	Conference	Standing	Postseason
Northern Illinois Huskies (Mid-American Conference) (1984–1986)
1984–85	Northern Illinois	15–13	11–7	4th	
1985–86	Northern Illinois	8–19	6–12	8th	
Northern Illinois Huskies (NCAA Division I independent) (1986–1987)
1986–87	Northern Illinois	11–16			
Northern Illinois Huskies (North Star Conference) (1987–1992)
1987–88	Northern Illinois	14–14	6–4	4th	
1988–89	Northern Illinois	23–7	12–2	2nd	
1989–90	Northern Illinois	26–5	12–0	1st	NCAA second round
1990–91	Northern Illinois	25–10	12–2	2nd	
1991–92	Northern Illinois	18–14	8–4	2nd	NCAA second round
Northern Illinois Huskies (Mid-Continent Conference) (1992–1994)
1992–93	Northern Illinois	24–6	15–1	1st	NCAA first round
1993–94	Northern Illinois	24–6	18–0	1st	NCAA first round
Northern Illinois:		188–110			
Wisconsin Badgers (Big Ten Conference) (1994–2003)
1994–95	Wisconsin	20–9	11–5	3rd	NCAA second round
1995–96	Wisconsin	21–8	12–4	3rd	NCAA second round
1996–97	Wisconsin	16–11	8–8	T–6th	
1997–98	Wisconsin	21–10	9–7	6th	NCAA first round
1998–99	Wisconsin	18–14	9–7	T–4th	WNIT Runners-Up
1999–2000	Wisconsin	21–12	8–8	T–5th	WNIT Champions
2000–01	Wisconsin	18–10	12–4	T–2nd	NCAA first round
2001–02	Wisconsin	19–12	8–8	T–5th	NCAA first round
2002–03	Wisconsin	7–21	5–11	8th	
Wisconsin:		161–107			
Wichita State Shockers (Missouri Valley Conference) (2003–2008)
2003–04	Wichita State	10–18	5–11	T–7th	
2004–05	Wichita State	5–22	2–16	9th	
2005–06	Wichita State	15–13	8–10	5th	
2006–07	Wichita State	9–20	4–14	9th	
2007–08	Wichita State	9–22	3–15	10th	
Wichita State:		48–95			
Nevada Wolf Pack (Western Athletic Conference) (2008–2012)
2008–09	Nevada	18–14	10–6	T–3rd	
2009–10	Nevada	17–16	10–6	3rd	WNIT First Round
2010–11	Nevada	22–11	9–7	4th	WNIT Second Round
2011–12	Nevada	7–23	3–11	T–7th	
Nevada Wolf Pack (Mountain West Conference) (2012–present)
2012–13	Nevada	9–23	2–14	9th	
2013–14	Nevada	18–13	12–6	T–3rd	
2014–15	Nevada	9–21	5–13	T–9th	
2015–16	Nevada	5–24	4–14	10th	
2016–17	Nevada	11–19	5–13	10th	
Nevada:		115–165	60–90		
Total:		512–477			
National champion Postseason invitational champion Conference regular season champion Conference regular season and conference tournament champion Division regular season champion Division regular season and conference tournament champion Conference tournament champion
