= 2016–17 Boise State Broncos women's basketball team =

American college basketball season

2016–17 Boise State Broncos women's basketball

Mountain West tournament champions

NCAA women's tournament, first round
- Conference: Mountain West Conference
- Record: 25–8 (12–6 MWC)
- Head coach: Gordy Presnell (12th season)
- Assistant coaches: Cody Butler; Heather Sower; Cariann Ramirez
- Home arena: Taco Bell Arena

2016–17 Mountain West Conference women's basketball standings
	Conf.				Overall
Team	W		L	PCT	W		L	PCT
Colorado State	15	–	3	.833	25	–	9	.735
Wyoming	13	–	5	.722	22	–	10	.688
Boise State†	12	–	6	.667	25	–	8	.758
UNLV	12	–	6	.667	22	–	11	.667
New Mexico	10	–	8	.556	15	–	15	.500
Utah State	9	–	9	.500	17	–	14	.548
Fresno State	8	–	10	.444	18	–	15	.545
San Jose State	7	–	11	.389	11	–	21	.344
San Diego State	6	–	12	.333	11	–	19	.367
Nevada	5	–	13	.278	11	–	19	.367
Air Force	2	–	16	.111	4	–	25	.138
† 2017 MW Tournament winner Rankings from AP poll

The 2016–17 Boise State Broncos women's basketball team represented Boise State University during the 2016–17 NCAA Division I women's basketball season. The Broncos, led by 12th-year head coach Gordy Presnell, played their home games at Taco Bell Arena as a member of the Mountain West Conference. They finished the season 22–11, 11–7 in Mountain West play to a finish in a tie for third place. They were also champions of the Mountain West women's tournament and earn an automatic trip to the NCAA women's tournament, where they lost in the first round to UCLA.

== Roster ==
2016–17 Boise State Broncos women's basketball team
Players
Coaches

Pos.	#	Name	Height	Year	Previous school	Hometown
F	1	Jordan Woodvine	5 ft 11 in (1.8 m)	Fr	South Salem HS	Salem, OR
F	2	Shalem Shaw	6 ft 1 in (1.85 m)	Jr	Reno HS	Reno, NV
G	10	Yaiza Rodriguez	5 ft 5 in (1.65 m)	Sr	Institut Joaquim Blume	Esplugues de Llobregat, Spain
G/F	11	Ellie Woerner (I) (redshirt)	6 ft 0 in (1.83 m)	So	Eastlake HS; Portland	Sammamish, WA
G	14	Braydey Hodgins	5 ft 8 in (1.73 m)	Fr	Chiawana HS	Pasco, WA
G	20	Marta Hermida	5 ft 11 in (1.8 m)	So	Margarita Salas HS	Madrid, Spain
G	21	Riley Lupfer	5 ft 9 in (1.75 m)	Fr	Lewis and Clark HS	Spokane, WA
F	24	A'Shanti Coleman (I) (redshirt)	6 ft 2 in (1.88 m)	So	Sacred Heart Cathedral Prep; Arizona	San Francisco, CA
F	22	Emerald Toth	6 ft 1 in (1.85 m)	Fr	Bozeman HS	Bozeman, MT
F	24	Leonie Edringer	6 ft 1 in (1.85 m)	So	Max-Planck-Gymnasium	Trier, Germany
C	31	Marijke Vanderschaaf	6 ft 3 in (1.91 m)	RS So	Eastlake HS	Sammamish, WA
F	33	Joyce Harrell	6 ft 0 in (1.83 m)	So	Cleveland HS	Seattle, WA
G	40	Brittney Pahukoa	5 ft 7 in (1.7 m)	Sr	Lake Stevens HS	Lake Stevens, WA
G	44	Brooke Pahukoa	5 ft 9 in (1.75 m)	Sr	Lake Stevens HS	Lake Stevens, WA

Head coach

- Gordy Presnell (Northwest Nazarene)

Assistant coach(es)

- Cody Butler (Nevada)
- Heather Sower (Boise State)
- Cariann Ramirez (Boise State)

Legend

- (C) Team captain
- (S) Suspended
- (I) Ineligible
- (W) Walk-on
- Injured
- Current redshirt

Roster

== Schedule ==
Date time, TV	Rank^{#}	Opponent^{#}	Result	Record	Site (attendance) city, state
Exhibition
11/06/2016*; 2:00 pm		Alaska–Fairbanks	W 75–61		Taco Bell Arena (604); Boise, ID
Non-conference regular season
11/13/2016*; 2:00 pm		Southern Oregon	W 89–45	1–0	Taco Bell Arena (496); Boise, ID
11/16/2016*; 5:30 pm		Portland State	W 94–76	2–0	Taco Bell Arena (638); Boise, ID
11/20/2016*; 2:00 pm		Seattle	W 73–68 ^{OT}	3–0	Taco Bell Arena (582); Boise, ID
11/25/2016*; 3:00 pm		at Saint Mary's; Hilton Concord Thanksgiving Classic	W 83–78	4–0	McKeon Pavilion (271); Moraga, CA
11/26/2016*; 1:00 pm		vs. Charlotte; Hilton Concord Thanksgiving Classic	W 68–65	5–0	McKeon Pavilion (106); Moraga, CA
12/01/2016*; 7:00 pm		Eastern Washington	W 67–64	6–0	Taco Bell Arena (613); Boise, ID
12/04/2016*; 3:00 pm		at Washington State	W 77–73 ^{OT}	7–0	Beasley Coliseum (699); Pullman, WA
12/07/2016*; 7:00 pm		Concordia (OR)	W 71–40	8–0	Taco Bell Arena (641); Boise, ID
12/11/2016*; 3:00 pm, P12N		at No. 11 Washington	L 66–92	8–1	Alaska Airlines Arena (2,028); Seattle, WA
12/18/2016*; 2:00 pm		Portland	W 74–60	9–1	Taco Bell Arena; Boise, ID
12/20/2016*; 2:00 pm		Hawaii	W 61–49	10–1	Taco Bell Arena (536); Boise, ID
Mountain West regular season
12/29/2016; 7:00 pm		Utah State	W 76–56	11–1 (1–0)	Taco Bell Arena (807); Boise, ID
12/31/2016; 2:00 pm		at Colorado State	W 51–45	12–1 (2–0)	Moby Arena (1,417); Fort Collins, CO
01/04/2017; 7:00 pm		UNLV	L 55–58	12–2 (2–1)	Taco Bell Arena (267); Boise, ID
01/07/2017; 3:00 pm		at San Diego State	L 77–84	12–3 (2–2)	Viejas Arena (714); San Diego, CA
01/14/2017; 7:00 pm		Fresno State	W 67–66	13–3 (3–2)	Taco Bell Arena (536); Boise, ID
01/18/2017; 7:00 pm		at New Mexico	L 68–75	13–4 (3–3)	The Pit (3,324); Albuquerque, NM
01/21/2017; 2:00 pm		San Jose State	W 86–64	14–4 (4–3)	Taco Bell Arena (792); Boise, ID
01/25/2017; 7:30 pm		at Nevada	L 62–69	14–5 (4–4)	Lawlor Events Center (951); Reno, NV
01/28/2017; 2:00 pm		Wyoming	W 64–54	15–5 (5–4)	Taco Bell Arena (938); Boise, ID
02/01/2017; 7:00 pm		Colorado State	L 53–60	15–6 (5–5)	Taco Bell Arena (943); Boise, ID
02/04/2016; 2:00 pm		at Utah State	L 63–65	15–7 (5–6)	Smith Spectrum (490); Logan, UT
02/11/2017; 2:00 pm		at Air Force	W 69–59	16–7 (6–6)	Clune Arena (358); Colorado Springs, CO
02/15/2017; 7:00 pm		New Mexico	W 64–62	17–7 (7–6)	Taco Bell Arena (948); Boise, ID
02/18/2017; 2:00 pm		at Wyoming	W 53–43	18–7 (8–6)	Arena-Auditorium (2,952); Laramie, WY
02/22/2017; 7:00 pm		Nevada	W 77–74	19–7 (9–6)	Taco Bell Arena (769); Boise, ID
02/25/2017; 3:00 pm		at San Jose State	W 69–61	20–7 (10–6)	Event Center Arena (1,342); San Jose, CA
02/28/2017; 7:00 pm		at Fresno State	W 66–48	21–7 (11–6)	Save Mart Center (2,090); Fresno, CA
03/03/2017; 7:00 pm		Air Force	W 72–48	22–7 (12–6)	Taco Bell Arena (1,435); Boise, ID
Mountain West Women's Tournament
03/07/2017; 3:30 pm	(4)	vs. (5) New Mexico; Quarterfinals	W 64–62	23–7	Thomas & Mack Center (1,642); Paradise, NV
03/08/2017; 7:30 pm	(4)	vs. (1) Colorado State; Semifinals	W 65–61	24–7	Thomas & Mack Center (1,670); Paradise, NV
03/10/2017; 1:00 pm	(4)	vs. (7) Fresno State; Championship game	W 66–53	25–7	Thomas & Mack Center (2,220); Paradise, NV
NCAA Women's Tournament
03/18/2017*; 4:30 pm, ESPN2	(13 B)	at (4 B) No. 15 UCLA; First Round	L 56–83	25–8	Pauley Pavilion (2,256); Los Angeles, CA
*Non-conference game. ^{#}Rankings from AP Poll. (#) Tournament seedings in parentheses. B=Bridgeport Region. All times are in Mountain Time.

== Rankings ==
2016–17 NCAA Division I women's basketball rankings

Regular season polls
Poll	Pre- Season	Week 2	Week 3	Week 4	Week 5	Week 6	Week 7	Week 8	Week 9	Week 10	Week 11	Week 12	Week 13	Week 14	Week 15	Week 16	Week 17	Week 18	Week 19	Final
AP	RV	RV	RV	RV	RV	NR	NR	RV	RV	NR	NR	NR	NR	NR	NR	NR	NR	NR	NR	N/A
Coaches	NR	NR	NR	NR	NR	NR	NR	NR	NR	NR	NR	NR	NR	NR	NR	NR	NR	NR	NR	

Legend
	Increase in ranking
	Decrease in ranking
	Not ranked previous week
(RV)	Received Votes

== See also ==
2016–17 Boise State Broncos men's basketball team
