= 2017 Mountain West Conference women's basketball tournament =

- Classification: Division I
- Season: 2016–17
- Teams: 11
- Site: Thomas & Mack Center; Paradise, NV
- Champions: Boise State (2nd title)
- Television: MWN

2016–17 Mountain West Conference women's basketball standings
	Conf.				Overall
Team	W		L	PCT	W		L	PCT
Colorado State	15	–	3	.833	25	–	9	.735
Wyoming	13	–	5	.722	22	–	10	.688
Boise State†	12	–	6	.667	25	–	8	.758
UNLV	12	–	6	.667	22	–	11	.667
New Mexico	10	–	8	.556	15	–	15	.500
Utah State	9	–	9	.500	17	–	14	.548
Fresno State	8	–	10	.444	18	–	15	.545
San Jose State	7	–	11	.389	11	–	21	.344
San Diego State	6	–	12	.333	11	–	19	.367
Nevada	5	–	13	.278	11	–	19	.367
Air Force	2	–	16	.111	4	–	25	.138
† 2017 MW Tournament winner Rankings from AP poll

The 2017 Mountain West Conference women's basketball tournament was held on March 6–10, 2017 at the Thomas & Mack Center in Las Vegas, Nevada. The Boise State Broncos won their third Mountain West tournament title and earned an automatic bid to the 2017 NCAA tournament.

== Seeds ==
Teams are seeded by conference record, with a ties broken by record between the tied teams followed by record against the regular-season champion, if necessary.

Seed	School	Conf (Overall)	Tiebreaker
#1	Colorado State	15–3	
#2	Wyoming	13–5	
#3	UNLV	12–6	1–0 vs. Boise State
#4	Boise State	12–6	0–1 vs. UNLV
#5	New Mexico	10–8	
#6	Utah State	9–9	
#7	Fresno State	8–10	
#8	San Jose State	7–11	
#9	San Diego State	6–12	
#10	Nevada	5–13	
#11	Air Force	2–16	

== Schedule ==
Game	Time*	Matchup^{#}	Television	TV Announcers	MW Radio Announcers
First round – Monday, March 6
1	2:00 pm	#8 San Jose State vs. #9 San Diego State	MWN	Rich Cellini & Krista Blunk	Nate Kreckman & Robert Smith
2	4:30 pm	#7 Fresno State vs. #10 Nevada	MWN	Rich Cellini & Krista Blunk	Chris Lewis & Marty Fletcher
3	7:00 pm	#6 Utah State vs. #11 Air Force	MWN	Rich Cellini & Krista Blunk	Nate Kreckman & Marty Fletcher
Quarterfinals – Tuesday, March 7
4	Noon	#1 Colorado State vs. #8 San Jose State	MWN	Rich Cellini & Krista Blunk	Nate Kreckman & Marty Fletcher
5	2:30 pm	#4 Boise State vs. #5 New Mexico	MWN	Rich Cellini & Krista Blunk	Chad Andrus & Marty Fletcher
6	6:00 pm	#2 Wyoming vs. #7 Fresno State	MWN	Rich Cellini & Krista Blunk	Chad Andrus & Robert Smith
7	8:30 pm	#3 UNLV vs. #6 Utah State	MWN	Rich Cellini & Krista Blunk	Nate Kreckman & Robert Smith
Semifinals – Wednesday, March 8
8	6:30 pm	#1 Colorado State vs. #4 Boise State	MWN	Rich Cellini & Krista Blunk	Nate Kreckman & Robert Smith
9	9:00 pm	#7 Fresno State vs. #3 UNLV	MWN	Rich Cellini & Krista Blunk	Chad Andrus & Robert Smith
Championship – Friday, March 10
10	Noon	#4 Boise State vs. #7 Fresno State	MWN	Rich Cellini & Krista Blunk	Chad Andrus & Robert Smith
*Game Times in PT. #-Rankings denote tournament seeding.

== Bracket ==
The tournament took place March 6–10.

First round Monday, March 6 MWN
8	San Jose State	76
9	San Diego State	58
7	Fresno State	62
10	Nevada	57
6	Utah State	46
11	Air Force	40

Quarterfinals; Tuesday, March 7 MWN
1	Colorado State	65
8	San Jose State	60
4	Boise State	64
5	New Mexico	62
2	Wyoming	48
7	Fresno State	58
3	UNLV	68
6	Utah State	43

Semifinals; Wednesday, March 8 MWN
1	Colorado State	61
4	Boise State	65
7	Fresno State	53
3	UNLV	51

Championship; Friday, March 10; MWN
4	Boise State	66
7	Fresno State	53
