= Liz Galloway McQuitter =

American basketball coach

Biographical details
- Born: August 15, 1955 (age 71)
- Education: University of Nevada-Las Vegas

Playing career
- 1975: Temple Junior College
- 1976–1978: UNLV
- 1978–1980: Chicago Hustle

Coaching career (HC unless noted)
- 1984–1986: Mundelein
- 1989–1991: DePaul (Asst.)
- 1991–1994: Lamar
- 1995–1998: Northern Illinois
- 1999–2002: Texas A&M (Asst.)

Head coaching record
- Overall: 76–117 (.394)

Liz Galloway McQuitter (born August 15, 1955) has held positions as head coach and assistant coach women's basketball at the collegiate level. In April, 2015, she ended her career in athletics retiring as head coach of the Rockdale High School in Rockdale, Texas. McQuitter served as head coach at Mundelein College (1984–1986), Lamar (1990–1994), and Northern Illinois (1994–1998). McQuitter took over the head coaching position at Lamar after the resignation of Al Barbre following an NCAA investigation which ended with two years probation and other penalties for the team. In spite of the cloudy start, McQuitter's team tied for first-place finish in the Sun Belt regular season. The Lady Cardinals were not eligible for post-season play that year. McQuitter left Lamar after four seasons to become head coach for the Northern Illinois Huskies women's basketball team. Her first season at Northern Illinois was also successful as the team qualified for the 1995 NCAA Women's Division I Basketball Tournament. Coach McQuitter served as assistant coach at Northwestern, Dartmouth, DePaul, and Texas A&M.

Liz Galloway McQuitter competed as a player at high school, junior college helping her team to a national championship, three years as a player for the UNLV Lady Rebels basketball team, and at the professional level playing for the Chicago Hustle.

== Head coaching record ==
Record table
Season	Team	Overall	Conference	Standing	Postseason
Mundelein College () (1984–1986) (Record not available)
Lamar Lady Cardinals (Sun Belt Conference) (1991–1994)
1991–92	Lamar	21–7	13–3	1st T	(Not eligible)
1992–93	Lamar	10–16	4–10		
1993–94	Lamar	8–19	5–9		
Lamar:		39–42 (.481)	22–22 (.500)		
Northern Illinois Huskies (Midwestern Collegiate Conference) (1994–1997)
1994–95	Northern Illinois	17–14	10–6	T–4th	NCAA 1st Round
1995–96	Northern Illinois	9–19	5–11	T–6th	
1996–97	Northern Illinois	7–20	5–11	T–6th	
Northern Illinois Huskies (MAC) (1997–1998)
1997–98	Northern Illinois	4–22	3–15	6th (West)	
Northern Illinois:		37–75 (.330)	23–43 (.348)		
Total:		76–117 (.394)			
National champion Postseason invitational champion Conference regular season champion Conference regular season and conference tournament champion Division regular season champion Division regular season and conference tournament champion Conference tournament champion
