= Northern Illinois Huskies women's basketball =

2025–26 Northern Illinois Huskies women's basketball team
- University: Northern Illinois University
- Head coach: Jacey Brooks (1st season)
- Location: DeKalb, Illinois
- Arena: NIU Convocation Center (capacity: 10,000)
- Conference: Horizon League
- Nickname: Huskies
- Colors: Cardinal and black

NCAA Division I tournament second round
- 1990, 1992

NCAA Division I tournament appearances
- 1990, 1992, 1993, 1994, 1995

AIAW tournament quarterfinals
- 1972
Other AIAW tournament results
Appearances	1972

Conference tournament champions
- 1990, 1992 (NSC); 1993 (Mid-Con); 1995 (MCC)

Conference regular-season champions
- 1989, 1990 (NSC); 1993, 1994 (Mid-Con)

Uniforms
Home	Away

The Northern Illinois Huskies women's basketball team is the college basketball team that represent Northern Illinois University (NIU) in DeKalb, Illinois, United States. The school's team currently competes in the Horizon League. The team last played in the NCAA Division I women's basketball tournament in 1995.

== Season-by-season records ==
Record table
Season	Coach	Overall	Conference	Standing	Postseason
Mary Bell (Independent) (1957–1977)
1957–58	Mary Bell	1–1			
1958–59	Mary Bell	3–1			
1959–60	Mary Bell	2–3			
1960–61	Mary Bell	5–1			
1961–62	Mary Bell	4–2			
1962–63	Mary Bell	3–3			
1963–64	Mary Bell	6–3			
1964–65	Mary Bell	4–5			
1965–66	Mary Bell	7–2			
1966–67	Mary Bell	4–4			
1967–68	Mary Bell	6–6			
1968–69	Mary Bell	8–3			
1969–70	Mary Bell	11–2			
1970–71	Mary Bell	9–4			
1971–72	Mary Bell	15–3			Midwest AIAW Region Champion; AIAW Elite Eight
1972–73	Mary Bell	6–9			Illinois AIAW Tournament
1973–74	Mary Bell	6–7			Illinois AIAW Tournament
1974–75	Mary Bell	1–11			Illinois AIAW Tournament
1975–76	Mary Bell	5–10			Illinois AIAW Tournament
1976–77	Mary Bell	3–10			Illinois AIAW Tournament
Mary Bell:		109–90			
Alex Textor (Independent) (1977–1981)
1977–78	Alex Textor	4–9			Illinois AIAW Tournament
1978–79	Alex Textor	11–8			Illinois AIAW Tournament
1979–80	Alex Textor	17–12			Illinois AIAW Tournament
1980–81	Alex Textor	15–17			Illinois AIAW Tournament
Alex Textor:		47–46			
Rita Horky (MAC) (1981–1983)
1981–82	Rita Horky	18–14	7–4	T–3rd	Illinois AIAW State Champion; Midwest AIAW Region Final
1982–83	Rita Horky	13–14	7–11	7th	
Rita Horky:		31–28	14–15		
Cherri Block (MAC) (1983–1984)
1983–84	Cherri Block	15–13	9–9	T–4th	
Cherri Block:		15–13	9–9		
Jane Albright (MAC) (1984–1986)
1984–85	Jane Albright	15–13	11–7	4th	
1985–86	Jane Albright	8–19	6–12	8th	
Jane Albright (Independent) (1986–1987)
1986–87	Jane Albright	11–16			
Jane Albright (North Star Conference) (1987–1992)
1987–88	Jane Albright	14–14	6–4	4th	
1988–89	Jane Albright	23–7	12–2	T–1st	
1989–90	Jane Albright	26–5	12–0	1st	NCAA 2nd Round
1990–91	Jane Albright	25–10	12–2	2nd	7th in NWIT
1991–92	Jane Albright	18–14	8–4	T–2nd	NCAA 2nd Round
Jane Albright (Mid-Continent Conference) (1992–1994)
1992–93	Jane Albright	24–6	15–1	1st	NCAA 1st Round
1993–94	Jane Albright	24–6	18–0	1st	NCAA 1st Round
Jane Albright:		188–110	100–32		
Liz Galloway-McQuitter (Midwestern Collegiate Conference) (1994–1997)
1994–95	Liz Galloway-McQuitter	17–14	10–6	T–4th	NCAA 1st Round
1995–96	Liz Galloway-McQuitter	9–19	5–11	T–6th	
1996–97	Liz Galloway-McQuitter	7–20	5–11	T–6th	
Liz Galloway-McQuitter (MAC) (1997–1998)
1997–98	Liz Galloway-McQuitter	4–22	3–15	6th (West)	
Liz Galloway-McQuitter:		37–75	23–43		
Carol Hammerle (MAC) (1998–2005)
1998–99	Carol Hammerle	10–16	7–9	3rd (West)	
1999–00	Carol Hammerle	6–22	5–11	6th (West)	
2000–01	Carol Hammerle	16–16	10–6	3rd (West)	
2001–02	Carol Hammerle	17–13	10–6	T–4th (West)	
2002–03	Carol Hammerle	12–16	8–8	5th (West)	
2003–04	Carol Hammerle	12–16	7–9	T–5th (West)	
2004–05	Carol Hammerle	7–21	4–12	T–6th (West)	
Carol Hammerle:		80–120	51–61		
Carol Owens (MAC) (2005–2010)
2005–06	Carol Owens	12–17	7–9	T–4th (West)	
2006–07	Carol Owens	19–12	8–8	3rd (West)	
2007–08	Carol Owens	10–18	6–8	4th (West)	
2008–09	Carol Owens	15–15	10–6	3rd (West)	
2009–10	Carol Owens	10–19	4–12	5th (West)	
Carol Owens:		66–81	35–43		
Kathi Bennett (MAC) (2010–2015)
2010–11	Kathi Bennett	13–17	7–9	4th (West)	
2011–12	Kathi Bennett	14–17	6–10	4th (West)	
2012–13	Kathi Bennett	7–23	2–14	6th (West)	
2013–14	Kathi Bennett	11–19	6–10	6th (West)	
2014–15	Kathi Bennett	12–17	8–10	5th (West)	
Kathi Bennett:		57–93	29–53		
Lisa Carlsen (MAC) (2015–2025)
2015–16	Lisa Carlsen	13–17	4–13	6th (West)	
2016–17	Lisa Carlsen	21–12	12–6	3rd (West)	WNIT 1st Round
2017–18	Lisa Carlsen	15–15	7–11	5th (West)	
2018–19	Lisa Carlsen	19–13	10–8	3rd (West)	
2019–20	Lisa Carlsen	11–19	7–1	6th (West)	
2020–21	Lisa Carlsen	12–12	10–8	7th	
2021–22	Lisa Carlsen	14–15	11–9	5th	
2022–23	Lisa Carlsen	16–17	8–10	T–5th	WBI 1st Round
2023–24	Lisa Carlsen	15-16	8–10	T–6th	
Lisa Carlsen:		136–136	77–76		
Total:		766–792			
National champion Postseason invitational champion Conference regular season champion Conference regular season and conference tournament champion Division regular season champion Division regular season and conference tournament champion Conference tournament champion

== Division I postseason results ==
=== NCAA tournament ===
The Huskies have appeared in five NCAA tournaments. Their combined record is 2–5.

Year	Seed	Region	Location	Round	Opponent	Result	NIU Head Coach
1990	5th	Midwest	DeKalb, IL; West Lafayette IN	First Round; Second Round	(12) Texas Tech (4) Purdue	W 84–63; L 86–81	Jane Albright
1992	11th	Mideast	Ruston, LA; West Lafayette, IN	First Round; Second Round	(6) Louisiana Tech (3) Purdue	W 77–71 (OT); L 98–62	Jane Albright
1993	11th	East	Washington, D.C.	First Round	(6) Georgetown	L 74–73	Jane Albright
1994	11th	Mideast	Springfield, MO	First Round	(6) SW Missouri State	L 75–56	Jane Albright
1995	16th	West	Nashville, TN	First Round	(1) Vanderbilt	L 90–54	Liz Galloway-McQuitter

=== National Invitation tournament ===
The Huskies have appeared in two National Invitation Tournaments. Their combined record is 1–3.

Year	Location	Round	Opponent	Result	NIU Head Coach
1991	Amarillo, TX	First Round; Consolation Semis; 7th Place Game	Houston; Alabama-Birmingham; Notre Dame	L 83–71; L 78–71; W 84–82	Jane Albright
2017	Brookings, SD	First Round	South Dakota State	L 94–84	Lisa Carlsen

=== AIAW tournament ===
The Huskies have appeared in one AIAW tournament. Their record is 1–1.

Year	Location	Round	Opponent	Result	NIU Head Coach
1972	Normal, IL	First Round; Quarterfinals	Washington State; West Chester State	W 50–43; L 66–54	Mary Bell

== Coaching staff ==
On June 30, 2015, the Huskies announced Lisa Carlsen as the next women's basketball head coach.

- Lisa Carlsen – Head Coach
- Kierra McCleary – Assistant Coach
- John McGinty – Assistant Coach
- Adam Tandez – Assistant Coach
- Jazz Weaver – Director of Basketball Operations
- Takima Keane – Graduate Assistant

== See also ==
- NIU Huskies men's basketball
- Mid-American Conference women's basketball tournament
