= Cox Pavilion =

Indoor arena on the University of Nevada, Las Vegas campus

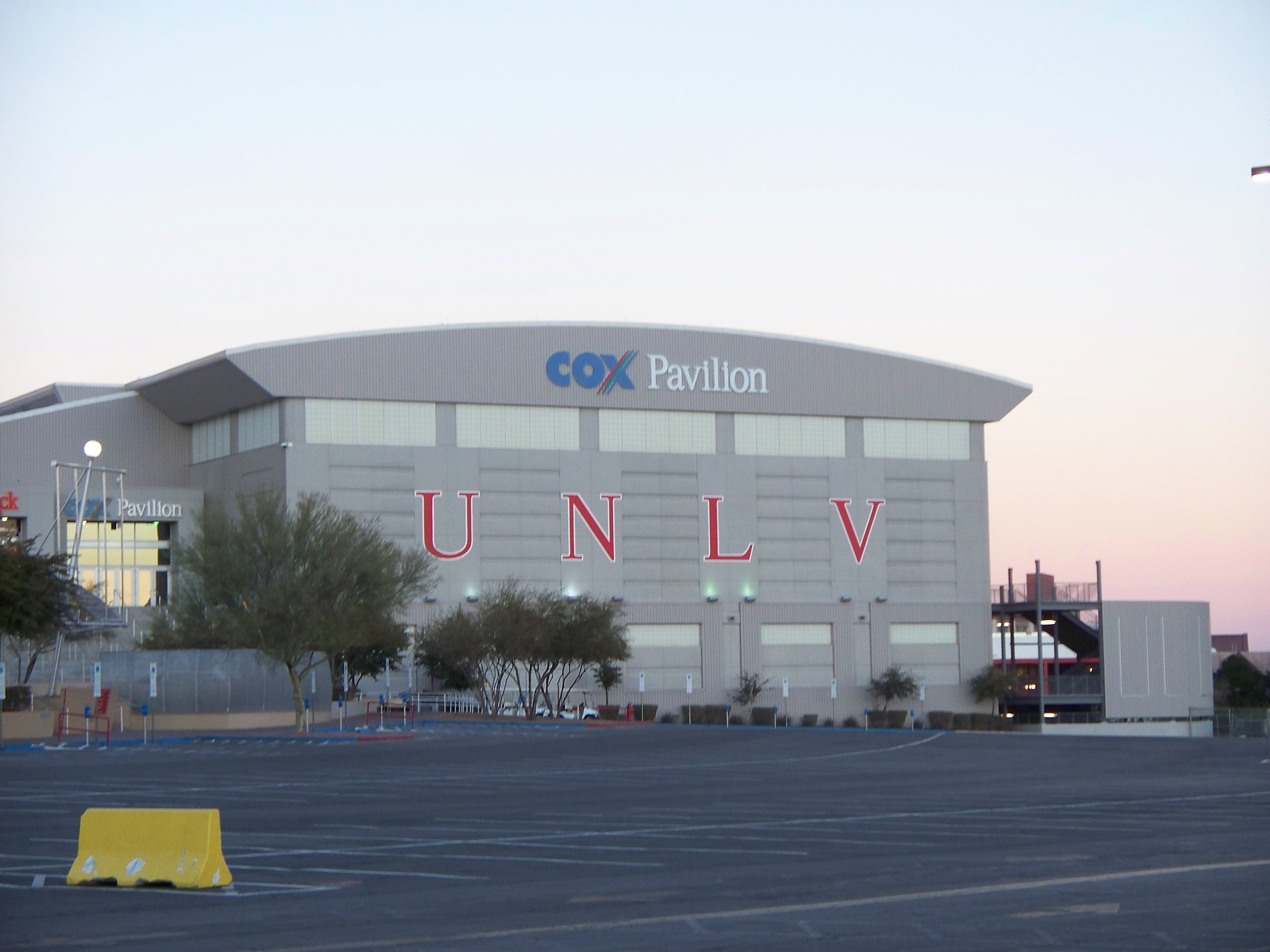
- Cox Pavilion, January 1, 2009

- Location in Nevada Location in the United States Location in North America
- Interactive map of Cox Pavilion
- Address: 4505 South Maryland Parkway
- Location: Paradise, Nevada, U.S.
- Coordinates: 36°6′15″N 115°8′35″W
- Owner: University of Nevada, Las Vegas
- Operator: University of Nevada, Las Vegas
- Capacity: Basketball: 2,454; Boxing: 3,286; Concerts: 3,372

Construction
- Opened: May 25, 2001; 25 years ago

Tenants
- UNLV Lady Rebels (NCAA) women's basketball (2001–present); UNLV Rebels women's volleyball (2001–present); NBA Summer League (2009–present); SlamBall (2023–present)

Cox Pavilion is a 78,300-square-foot (7,270 m^{2}), multi-purpose indoor arena on the University of Nevada, Las Vegas, campus, connected to the Thomas & Mack Center. The Pavilion serves as the home court for UNLV Lady Rebels women's basketball and volleyball programs as well as the annual NBA Summer League. In 2026, the venue changed its name to "The Pavilion" after Cox was purchased by Spectrum.

== History ==
Cox Communications and UNLV formed a partnership for the new facility in 2001. The arena cost $16.8 million. As part of a $5 million agreement, Cox Communications secured the naming rights for the facility as well as opportunities for sponsorship and hospitality.

The pavilion is a two-level structure. The ground floor features new men's and women's locker facilities, player lounges and practice courts for basketball and volleyball. The top level is a multi-purpose venue with a seating capacity of 2,500 to 3,100 for sporting events.

In addition to UNLV athletic events, the Cox Pavilion hosts a variety of events, including small concerts, boxing events, theater-style family shows, corporate parties, trade shows and more.

On November 15, 2007, the arena hosted the Democratic Presidential Debate for the 2008 presidential election.

Total Nonstop Action Wrestling held their Unbreakable pay-per-view event at the venue on April 17, 2025.

WWE held their Worlds Collide: Las Vegas event at the venue on September 12, 2025.

== See also ==
- List of NCAA Division I basketball arenas
