= Khanani =

Khanani may refer to:

- Altaf Khanani, Pakistani fraudster and money launderer
- Khanani and Kalia Int., Pakistani money service company involved in fraud
- Omar Khanani, British-American basketball player
