= KKI =

KKI may refer to:

- Khanani and Kalia International (Private) Limited, a former foreign exchange company in Pakistan
- Körfuknattleikssamband Íslands (Icelandic Basketball Federation), the national governing body of basketball in Iceland
- Kisak-Kisak Incorporated (Defense Contractor specializing in Commercial Off-the Shelf (COTS) Satellite Simulation Software), A U.S. D.O.D. Contractor developing and marketing state-of-the-art; award winning satellite simulation software.
- Kavya Kishor International, International literary organization.
