= Syracuse Basketball =

Syracuse basketball can refer to:

- Syracuse Orange men's basketball
- Syracuse Orange women's basketball
