= Zarco Exchange =

Zarco Exchange Company (Pvt.) Ltd
- Company type: Private Limited
- Industry: Financial services
- Founded: Lahore, Pakistan (1997)
- Headquarters: Karachi, Lahore and many other cities in Pakistan
- Key people: Sayd Lakht-e-Hussnain (CEO)
- Revenue: $18 Million USD (2009)
- Number of employees: At least 900 persons
- Website: www.zarcoexchange.com

Zarco Exchange international is a foreign exchange market company based in Lahore. It is one of the largest Western Union agents for Pakistan of and in 2009 the company was ranked second largest nationwide after Khanani & Kalia International.

== Operation ==
Zarco Exchange has a large scale network of office nationwide. The company has working relationships and acts as agent for companies like Western Union, PayPal and Webmoney. The company also introduced its own Visa traveler cheques and other financial products.

== History ==
In August 2009 Zarco became the second Forex company to be closed after Khanani and Kalia in what became known as the Pakistan Forex Scam Case when the Pakistan Finance ministry accused Zarco of money laundering and illegal money transfers to other countries. The State Bank of Pakistan suspended its license. More than 3500 of its employees had to stay home as company was forced to close all its 727 offices.

== Investigation ==
An investigation by the Pakistan Federal Investigation Agency raised a number of allegations of fraud. On 7 August 2009 the agency raided and closed all Zarco 727 exchange outlets in Pakistan. Zarco Exchange CEO, Sayd Lakht-e-Hussnain denied being involved in any fraud and a complex legal dispute followed resulting in claim and counter claim of fraud and deception by the State Bank of Pakistan and Zarco and its management.

In 2009 it became involved in the Pakistan Forex Scam Case after it was implicated by the Pakistani government. This resulted in its license being withdrawn and a number of allegations made against its directors and manager in relation to money laundering. However the courts eventually cleared the company and all the accused and its license was restored in 2011, after which the company resumed trading.

== Reinstatement ==
In December 2010, The Special Court (offences in banking) Lahore said it saw no reason that Zarco should not request a revival of its license from the State Bank of Pakistan. In February 2011 Sayd Lakht-e-Hassnain was released by the Federal Investigation Agency after it decided to no longer pursue the case. In response to the judgment by The Special Court (offences in banking) Lahore by April 2011 the State Bank of Pakistan had reinstated Zarco Exchange's licenses, and it restarted its operations.
