= Syracuse Orange women's basketball =

Women's basketball team of Syracuse University

2026–27 Syracuse Orange women's basketball team
- University: Syracuse University
- First season: 1971–72; 55 years ago
- Head coach: Felisha Legette-Jack (4th season)
- Location: Syracuse, New York
- Arena: JMA Wireless Dome (capacity: 49,262)
- Conference: Atlantic Coast Conference
- Nickname: Orange
- Colors: Orange
- Student section: Otto’s Army
- All-time record: 804–678 (.543), 51st season

NCAA Division I tournament runner-up
- 2016
Other NCAA Division I tournament results
Final Four	2016
Elite Eight	2016
Sweet Sixteen	2016
Appearances	1985, 1988, 2002, 2008, 2013, 2014, 2015, 2016, 2017, 2018, 2019, 2021, 2024, 2026

AIAW tournament appearances
- 1981

Uniforms
Home	Away

The Syracuse Orange women's basketball program is an intercollegiate women's basketball team representing Syracuse University. The program is classified in the NCAA's Division I, and the team competes in the Atlantic Coast Conference. The Orange play their home basketball games at the JMA Wireless Dome, originally the Carrier Dome, in the University Hill neighborhood of Syracuse, New York. The team is coached by Felisha Legette-Jack.

== History ==
Basketball started at Syracuse in 1898, playing against Hamilton Ontario YMCA. The Varsity team was fielded in 1971.

2015-2016 was one of the most notable seasons for Syracuse Women's basketball, gaining the highest seed in the NCAA tournament.

== Year by year results ==
Record table
Season	Coach	Overall	Conference	Standing	Postseason
Muriel Smith (Independent) (1971–1978)
1971-72	Muriel Smith	5-5			
1972-73	Muriel Smith	5-3			
1973-74	Muriel Smith	4-5			
1974-75	Muriel Smith	10-0			
1975-76	Muriel Smith	6-8			
1976-77	Muriel Smith	12-5			
1977-78	Muriel Smith	15-7			
Muriel Smith:		57–33 (.633)			
Barbara Jacobs (Independent) (1979–1982)
1978-79	Barbara Jacobs	15-3			
1979-80	Barbara Jacobs	17-10			
1980-81	Barbara Jacobs	26-8			AIAW Tournament, 1st round
1910-82	Barbara Jacobs	19-9			
Barbara Jacobs:		77–30 (.720)			
Barbara Jacobs (Big East Conference) (1983–1993)
1982-83	Barbara Jacobs	12-15	4-4		
1983-84	Barbara Jacobs	14-14	5-3		
1984-85	Barbara Jacobs	18-13	10-5		NCAA Tournament, 1st round
1985-86	Barbara Jacobs	19-10	12-4		
1986-87	Barbara Jacobs	15-13	11-5		
1987-88	Barbara Jacobs	22-9	13-3		NCAA Tournament, 1st round
1988-89	Barbara Jacobs	15-12	7-8		
1989-90	Barbara Jacobs	15-13	7-9		
1990-91	Barbara Jacobs	7-21	3-13		
1991-92	Barbara Jacobs	9-19	5-13		
1992-93	Barbara Jacobs	6-21	4-14		
Barbara Jacobs:		152–160 (.487)	81–81 (.500)		
Marianna Freeman (Big East Conference) (1993–2003)
1993-94	Marianna Freeman	5-23	2-16		
1994-95	Marianna Freeman	7-20	5-13		
1995-96	Marianna Freeman	14-14	9-9		
1996-97	Marianna Freeman	6-21	4-14		
1997-98	Marianna Freeman	12-15	7-11		
1998-99	Marianna Freeman	10-17	6-12		
1999-00	Marianna Freeman	10-18	3-13		
2000-01	Marianna Freeman	12-15	6-10		
2001-02	Marianna Freeman	18-13	9-7		NCAA Tournament, 1st round
2002-03	Marianna Freeman	10-18	5-11		
Marianna Freeman:		104–174 (.374)	56–116 (.326)		
Keith Cieplicki (Big East Conference) (2003–2006)
2003–04	Keith Cieplicki	6-21	3-13		
2004–05	Keith Cieplicki	13-16	4-12		
2005–06	Keith Cieplicki	9-18	2-14		
Keith Cieplicki:		28–55 (.337)	9–39 (.188)		
Quentin Hillsman (Big East Conference) (2006–2013)
2006–07	Quentin Hillsman	9–20	3–13	T-13th	
2007–08	Quentin Hillsman	22–9	10–6	T-5th	NCAA Tournament, 1st Round
2008–09	Quentin Hillsman	17–15	5–11	T-11th	WNIT, 2nd Round
2009–10	Quentin Hillsman	25–11	7–9	T-8th	WNIT Quarterfinals
2010–11	Quentin Hillsman	25–10	9–7	T-7th	WNIT Quarterfinals
2011–12	Quentin Hillsman	22–15	6–10	T-10th	WNIT Semifinals
2012–13	Quentin Hillsman	24–8	11–5	T-3rd	NCAA Tournament, 1st Round
Quentin Hillsman:		144–88 (.621)	51–61 (.455)		
Quentin Hillsman (Atlantic Coast Conference) (2013–2021)
2013–14	Quentin Hillsman	23–10	10–6	5th	NCAA Tournament, 2nd Round
2014–15	Quentin Hillsman	22–10	11–5	T-4th	NCAA Tournament, 2nd Round
2015–16	Quentin Hillsman	30–8	13–3	3rd	NCAA Tournament Runner-up
2016–17	Quentin Hillsman	22–11	11–5	6th	NCAA Tournament, 2nd Round
2017–18	Quentin Hillsman	22–9	10–6	T–6th	NCAA Tournament, 1st Round
2018–19	Quentin Hillsman	25–9	11–5	5th	NCAA Tournament, 2nd Round
2019–20	Quentin Hillsman	16–15	9–9	8th	Tournament not held
2020–21	Quentin Hillsman	15–9	9–7	T-4th	NCAA Tournament, 2nd Round
Quentin Hillsman:		175–81 (.684)	84–46 (.646)		
Vonn Read (Atlantic Coast Conference) (2021–2022)
2021–22	Vonn Read	11–18	4–14	T–11th	
Vonn Read:		11–18 (.379)	4–14 (.222)		
Felisha Legette-Jack (Atlantic Coast Conference) (2022–present)
2022–23	Felisha Legette-Jack	20–13	9–9	T-8th	WNIT Super 16
2023–24	Felisha Legette-Jack	24–8	13–5	T-2nd	NCAA Tournament, 2nd Round
2024–25	Felisha Legette-Jack	12–18	6–12	T-12th	
2025–26	Felisha Legette-Jack	24–9	12–6	T-5th	NCAA tournament, 2nd Round
Felisha Legette-Jack:		80–48 (.625)	28–26 (.519)		
Total:		828–687 (.547)			
National champion Postseason invitational champion Conference regular season champion Conference regular season and conference tournament champion Division regular season champion Division regular season and conference tournament champion Conference tournament champion

== Postseason results ==
=== NCAA Division I ===
The Orange have appeared in the NCAA Division I women's basketball tournament fourteen times, with a record of 12–14.

Year	Seed	Round	Opponent	Result
1985	(8)	Second Round	#1 Old Dominion	L 88–63
1988	(6)	Second Round	#3 Ohio State	L 116–75
2002	(10)	First Round	#7 Drake	L 87–69
2008	(7)	First Round	#10 Hartford	L 59–55
2013	(7)	First Round	#10 Creighton	L 61–56
2014	(6)	First Round; Second Round	#11 Chattanooga #3 Kentucky	W 59–53; L 59–54
2015	(8)	First Round; Second Round	#9 Nebraska #1 South Carolina	W 72–69; L 97–68
2016	(4)	First Round; Second Round; Sweet Sixteen; Elite Eight; Final Four; Championship	#13 Army #12 Albany #1 South Carolina #7 Tennessee #7 Washington #1 Connecticut	W 73–56; W 76–59; W 80–72; W 89–67; W 80–59; L 81–52
2017	(8)	First Round; Second Round	(9) Iowa State (1) Connecticut	W 85–65; L 94–64
2018	(8)	First Round	(9) Oklahoma State	L 84–57
2019	(3)	First Round; Second Round	(14) Fordham (6) South Dakota State	W 70–49; L 75–64
2021	(8)	First Round; Second Round	(9) South Dakota State (1) Connecticut	W 72–55; L 83–47
2024	(6)	First Round; Second Round	(11) Arizona (3) Connecticut	W 74–69; L 72–64
2026	(9)	First Round; Second Round	(8) Iowa State (1) Connecticut	W 72–63; L 45–98

=== AIAW Division I ===
The Orange made one appearance in the AIAW National Division I basketball tournament, with a combined record of 0–1.

Year	Round	Opponent	Result
1981	First Round	Kentucky	L, 80–81

== Roster ==
2026–27 Syracuse Orange women's basketball team
Players
Coaches

Pos.	#	Name	Height	Year	Previous school	Hometown
G	0	Tyi Skinner	5 ft 5 in (1.65 m)	GS	SMU	Washington, D.C.
F	1	Keira Scott	6 ft 1 in (1.85 m)	Jr	DME Academy	Falls Church, VA
G	3	Olivia Schmitt	5 ft 5 in (1.65 m)	Jr	DME Academy	Staten Island, NY
G	4	Madison Howard	5 ft 8 in (1.73 m)	Fr	Monsignor Scanlon	Bronx, NY
G	5	Angelica Velez	5 ft 7 in (1.7 m)	Sr	LSU	Bronx, NY
G	6	Elif Çayir	5 ft 10 in (1.78 m)	Fr		Ankara, Turkey
F	8	Jaleesa Molina	6 ft 3 in (1.91 m)	Sr	Temple	The Hague, Netherlands
F	9	Célaine Ricco	5 ft 8 in (1.73 m)	Fr		Melun, France
F	10	Destiny Robinson	6 ft 0 in (1.83 m)	Fr	St. Mary's	Queens, NY
	14	Shy Hawkins	6 ft 2 in (1.88 m)	Jr	William Floyd	Mastic Beach, NY
G	20	Dominique Darius	5 ft 10 in (1.78 m)	GS	USC	Jacksonville, FL
G	21	Emely Rodrigeuz	6 ft 0 in (1.83 m)	Jr	Iowa	La Romana, Dominican Republic
F	23	Sarah Rambus	6 ft 3 in (1.91 m)	Sr	Oregon	Flint, MI
C	44	Uche Izoje	6 ft 3 in (1.91 m)	So		Asaba, Nigeria

Head coach

- Felisha Legette-Jack (Syracuse)

Assistant coach(es)

- Natasha Adair (South Florida)
- Khyreed Carter (Michigan State)
- Caleb Samson (Urbana)

Legend

- (C) Team captain
- (S) Suspended
- (I) Ineligible
- (W) Walk-on
- Injured
- Current redshirt

Roster
Last update: August 31, 2026

== See also ==
- Syracuse Orange men's basketball
