= 2016 NCAA Division I women's basketball championship game =

2016 NCAA Tournament Championship Game
National championship game
| Syracuse Orange | Connecticut Huskies |
| ACC | AAC |
| (30–7) | (37–0) |
|---|---|
| 51 | 82 |
| Head coach: Quentin Hillsman | Head coach: Geno Auriemma |
- AP: 14
- Coaches: 15
- AP: 1
- Coaches: 1
| | 1 | 2 | 3 | 4 | Total |
|---|---|---|---|---|---|
| Syracuse Orange | 13 | 10 | 20 | 8 | 51 |
| Connecticut Huskies | 28 | 22 | 14 | 18 | 82 |
- Date: April 5, 2016
- Venue: Bankers Life Fieldhouse, Indianapolis, Indiana
- MVP: Breanna Stewart, Connecticut
- Favorite: Connecticut by 26
- Referees: Dee Kantner, Lisa Jones, Beverly Roberts
- Attendance: 14,514

United States TV coverage
- Network: ESPN
- Announcers: Beth Mowins (play-by-play); Doris Burke (color); Holly Rowe (sideline)
- Nielsen Ratings: 0.7 (2.972 million)

The 2016 NCAA Division I women's basketball championship game was the final game of the 2016 NCAA Division I women's basketball tournament, played to determine the national champion for the 2015–16 NCAA Division I women's basketball season. The Connecticut Huskies (UConn) defeated the Syracuse Orange to win their fourth consecutive championship. Breanna Stewart was voted Most Outstanding Player for the fourth straight time. Head coach Geno Auriemma surpassed John Wooden's record winning 11 NCAA national championships.

This was the first Division I women's championship game to be played in quarters instead of halves, following an NCAA rule change for women's basketball only that took effect in the 2015–16 season.

== Participants ==
Going into the game, UConn and Syracuse had met 49 times in women's basketball, mostly when both teams were in the Big East Conference, with UConn winning 37 games. The last game between the two teams was in 2013, the final season before the three-way split of the Big East, when the Huskies won 64–51 in the Big East semifinals.

Following that season, Syracuse and two other Big East schools left for the ACC; the seven schools that did not sponsor Division I FBS football left to form a new Big East Conference; and the remaining members of the original Big East, including UConn, reorganized as the American Athletic Conference.

== Game summary ==
The 2016 NCAA Women's Division I Basketball Championship Game was played on April 5, 2016, at Bankers Life Fieldhouse in Indianapolis. Notable performances were by Breanna Stewart, voted four years in a row the Most Outstanding Player, forward Morgan Tuck and point guard Moriah Jefferson. Tuck scored 19 points, with 5 assists and 7 steals, while Jefferson had 13 points, 5 assists and 3 steals.

Syracuse shot only 35.5 percent from the floor, compared to Connecticut's 51.9 percent, and the Orange found themselves in a 50–23 hole at halftime. Syracuse scored 16 straight points to get within 60–43 with 2:02 left in the third quarter, but the Huskies went on a 22–8 run to end the game.

ESPN

Tuesday, April 5
8:30 PM

Box score

#4 Syracuse 51, #1 Connecticut 82
Scoring by quarter: 13–28, 10–22, 20–14, 8–18
| Pts: C. Fondren 16; Rebs: B. Day 5 Asts: B. Sykes 2 | Pts: B. Stewart 24; Rebs: B. Stewart 10; Asts: B. Stewart 6 |

Bankers Life Fieldhouse - Indianapolis, Indiana
Attendance: 14,514
Referees: Dee Kantner, Lisa Jones & Beverly Roberts

== Broadcast ==
The Championship Game was broadcast in the United States by ESPN. Beth Mowins was calling the play-by-play, with Doris Burke providing color commentary and Holly Rowe on the court. Kevin Negandhi served as the studio host. Kara Lawson and Rebecca Lobo served as studio commentators. The game was seen by 2.97 million viewers.

Radio coverage in the United States was provided by Westwood One.

== See also ==
- 2016 NCAA Division I men's basketball championship game
- 2016 NCAA Division I women's basketball tournament
