= 2015–16 Florida State Seminoles women's basketball team =

Intercollegiate basketball season

2015–16 Florida State Seminoles women's basketball

NCAA tournament (5 Seed), Sweet Sixteen
- Conference: Atlantic Coast Conference

Ranking
- Coaches: No. 12
- AP: No. 17
- Record: 25–8 (13–3 ACC)
- Head coach: Sue Semrau (19th season)
- Assistant coaches: Lance White; Brooke Wyckoff; Danielle Atkinson
- Home arena: Donald L. Tucker Center (Capacity: 12,100)

2015–16 ACC women's basketball standings
| | Conf. | | | | Overall |
| Team | W | | L | PCT | W | | L | PCT |
|---|---|---|---|---|---|---|---|---|
| No. 2 Notre Dame † | 16 | – | 0 | 1.000 | 33 | – | 2 | .943 |
| No. 8 Louisville | 15 | – | 1 | .938 | 26 | – | 8 | .765 |
| No. 14 Syracuse | 13 | – | 3 | .813 | 30 | – | 8 | .789 |
| No. 17 Florida State | 13 | – | 3 | .813 | 25 | – | 8 | .758 |
| No. 19 Miami (FL) | 10 | – | 6 | .625 | 24 | – | 9 | .727 |
| NC State | 10 | – | 6 | .625 | 20 | – | 11 | .645 |
| Duke | 8 | – | 8 | .500 | 20 | – | 12 | .625 |
| Georgia Tech | 8 | – | 8 | .500 | 20 | – | 13 | .606 |
| Virginia | 6 | – | 10 | .375 | 18 | – | 16 | .529 |
| Wake Forest | 6 | – | 10 | .375 | 17 | – | 16 | .515 |
| Virginia Tech | 5 | – | 11 | .313 | 18 | – | 14 | .563 |
| North Carolina | 4 | – | 12 | .250 | 14 | – | 18 | .438 |
| Pittsburgh | 4 | – | 12 | .250 | 13 | – | 18 | .419 |
| Boston College | 2 | – | 14 | .125 | 15 | – | 16 | .484 |
| Clemson | 0 | – | 16 | .000 | 4 | – | 26 | .133 |
† 2016 ACC tournament winner As of April 5, 2016; Rankings from AP poll

The 2015–16 Florida State Seminoles women's basketball team, variously Florida State or FSU, represented Florida State University during the 2015–16 NCAA Division I women's basketball season. Florida State competed in Division I of the National Collegiate Athletic Association (NCAA). The Seminoles were led by nineteenth year head coach Sue Semrau and played their home games at the Donald L. Tucker Center on the university's Tallahassee, Florida campus. They were members of the Atlantic Coast Conference.

The Seminoles achieved their fourth straight twenty-win season and reached the Sweet Sixteen of the NCAA tournament in consecutive years for the first time in school history.

== Previous season ==
Florida State finished the 2014–15 season with a 32–5 record, 14–2 in ACC play, to finish in second place. They appeared in the finals of the ACC Tournament and reached the elite eight of the NCAA Tournament.

== Roster ==
2015–16 Florida State Seminoles women's basketball team
Players
Coaches

| Pos. | # | Name | Height | Year | Previous school | Hometown |
|---|---|---|---|---|---|---|
| C | 2 | Adut Bulgak | 6 ft 4 in (1.93 m) | Sr | Archbishop O'Leary; Trinity Valley CC | Edmonton, AB, Canada |
| G | 3 | Emiah Bingley | 5 ft 7 in (1.7 m) | Sr | Lee's Summit West; Iowa State | Kansas City, MO |
| G | 4 | Rachel Antoniadou | 5 ft 9 in (1.75 m) | Fr | Dandenong Rangers | Ripplebrook, Victoria, Australia |
| G | 10 | Leticia Romero | 5 ft 8 in (1.73 m) | RS Jr | I.E.S. Joaquín Artiles; Kansas State | Las Palmas, Spain |
| F | 11 | María Conde | 6 ft 1 in (1.85 m) | Fr | Estudiantes | Madrid, Spain |
| G | 12 | Brittany Brown | 5 ft 8 in (1.73 m) | Jr | Choctawhatchee | Fort Walton Beach, FL |
| F | 20 | Shakayla Thomas | 5 ft 11 in (1.8 m) | So | Sylacauga | Sylacauga, AL |
| F | 23 | Ivey Slaughter | 6 ft 1 in (1.85 m) | Jr | Tattnall Square Academy | Macon, GA |
| C | 25 | Ama Degbeon | 6 ft 2 in (1.88 m) | So | Grunberg | Grünberg, Germany |
| G | 32 | Imani Wright | 5 ft 9 in (1.75 m) | Jr | Liberty-Eylau; Baylor | Hooks, TX |
| C | 42 | Kai James | 6 ft 5 in (1.96 m) | Jr | Dwyer | West Palm Beach, FL |

Head coach

- Sue Semrau (UC San Diego)

Assistant coach(es)

- Lance White (Texas Tech)
- Brooke Wyckoff (Florida State)
- Danielle Atkinson (Florida)

Legend

- (C) Team captain
- (S) Suspended
- (I) Ineligible
- (W) Walk-on
- Injured
- Current redshirt

Roster
Last update: 2015-10-17

=== Depth chart ===
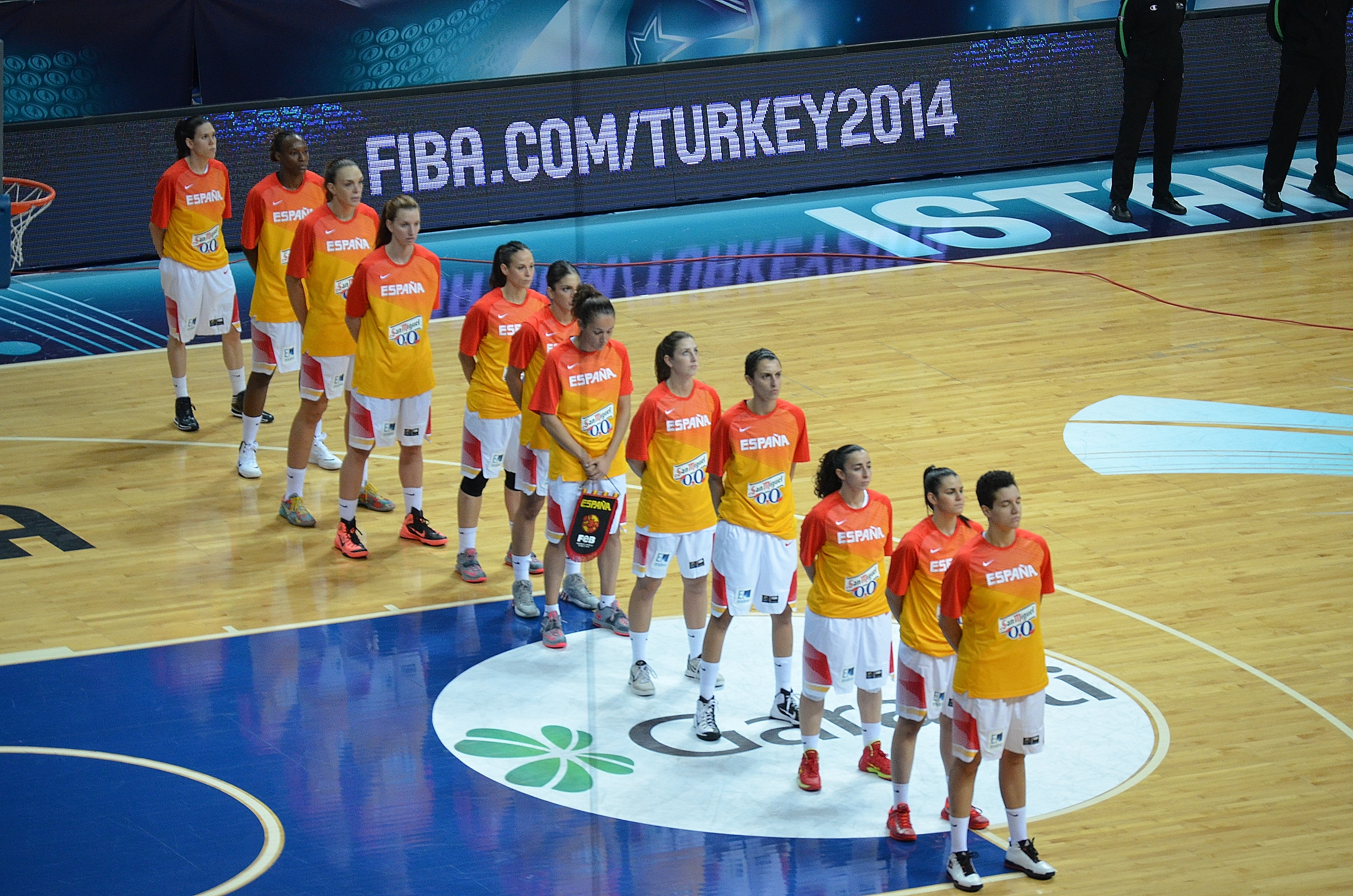
Current team member Leticia Romero (second from front) also plays for the Spanish National Team.

| Pos. | Starting 5 | Bench |
|---|---|---|
| C | Adut Bulgak |
| PF | Shakayla Thomas |
| SF | Ivey Slaughter |
| SG | Leticia Romero |
| PG | Brittany Brown |

== Rankings ==
Regular season polls
| Poll | Pre- Season | Week 2 | Week 3 | Week 4 | Week 5 | Week 6 | Week 7 | Week 8 | Week 9 | Week 10 | Week 11 | Week 12 | Week 13 | Week 14 | Week 15 | Week 16 | Week 17 | Week 18 | Week 19 | Final |
|---|---|---|---|---|---|---|---|---|---|---|---|---|---|---|---|---|---|---|---|---|
| AP | 7 | 6 | 14 | 13 | 11 | 11 | 10 | 15 | 19 | 16 | 14 | 11 | 10 | 10 | 10 | 12 | 14 | 17 | 17 | N/A |
| Coaches | 7 | 14 т | 13 | 14 | 9 | 10 | 13 | 13 т | 15 | 14 | 13 | 11 | 9 | 9 | 9 | 12 | 10 | 10 | 10 | 12 |

== Schedule ==
Florida State was picked to finish second in the ACC while Adut Bulgak and Leticia Romero were named to the preseason All-ACC team. Adut Bulgak was named a preseason All-American.

| Date time, TV | Rank^{#} | Opponent^{#} | Result | Record | High points | High rebounds | High assists | Site (attendance) city, state |
Exhibition
| November 8*; 2:00 p.m. | No. 7 | West Florida | W 99–36 | 0–0 | 17 – Tied | 9 – Degbeon | 7 – Romero | Donald L. Tucker Center; Tallahassee, FL |
Non-conference regular season
| November 16*; 5:30 p.m., SECN | No. 6 | at Florida | L 72–82 | 0–1 | 20 – Bulgak | 14 – Bulgak | 2 – Tied | O'Connell Center (2,009); Gainesville, FL |
| November 19*; 7:00 p.m., ESPN3 | No. 6 | Tulane | W 78–72 | 1–1 | 26 – Thomas | 10 – Tied | 5 – Brown | Donald L. Tucker Center (2,756); Tallahassee, FL |
| November 22*; 5:00 p.m., ESPN3 | No. 6 | UAB | W 84–44 | 2–1 | 26 – Bulgak | 10 – Bulgak | 9 – Brown | Donald L. Tucker Center (2,394); Tallahassee, FL |
| November 24*; 11:00 a.m., ESPN3 | No. 14 | North Florida | W 80–28 | 3–1 | 19 – Bulgak | 9 – Thomas | 6 – Slaughter | Donald L. Tucker Center (3,565); Tallahassee, FL |
| November 27*; 2:00 p.m. | No. 14 | at LIU Brooklyn; LIU Turkey Classic | W 78–42 | 4–1 | 20 – Bulgak | 9 – Bulgak | 7 – Brown | Steinberg Wellness Center (129); Brooklyn, NY |
| November 28*; 2:00 p.m. | No. 14 | vs. Sam Houston State; LIU Turkey Classic | W 94–37 | 5–1 | 24 – Brown | 7 – Tied | 10 – Romero | Steinberg Wellness Center (129); Brooklyn, NY |
| December 3*; 7:00 p.m., ESPN3 | No. 13 | Rutgers; ACC–Big Ten Women's Challenge | W 65–43 | 6–1 | 18 – Romero | 5 – Bulgak | 4 – Tied | Donald L. Tucker Center (2,699); Tallahassee, FL |
| December 6*; 2:00 p.m., ESPN3 | No. 13 | Temple | W 75–47 | 7–1 | 23 – Thomas | 10 – Tied | 4 – Brown | Donald L. Tucker Center (2,784); Tallahassee, FL |
| December 11*; 6:00 p.m., ESPN2 | No. 11 | vs. No. 1 Connecticut; Hall of Fame Women's Challenge | L 49–73 | 7–2 | 16 – Thomas | 11 – Bulgak | 2 – Tied | Mohegan Sun Arena (8,157); Uncasville, CT |
| December 15*; 6:30 p.m., ESPN3 | No. 11 | Mercer | W 79–36 | 8–2 | 18 – Thomas | 10 – Slaughter | 7 – Romero | Donald L. Tucker Center (2,906); Tallahassee, FL |
| December 19*; 2:00 p.m., ESPN3 | No. 11 | Murray State | W 101–59 | 9–2 | 21 – Tied | 9 – Slaughter | 9 – Romero | Donald L. Tucker Center (2,564); Tallahassee, FL |
| December 21*; 5:00 p.m., ESPNU | No. 10 | at No. 22 Arizona State | L 56–68 | 9–3 | 17 – Brown | 7 – Bulgak | 6 – Brown | Wells Fargo Arena (1,783); Tempe, AZ |
| December 28*; 7:00 p.m., ESPN3 | No. 15 | Jacksonville | W 77–60 | 10–3 | 23 – Thomas | 6 – Tied | 8 – Romero | Donald L. Tucker Center (2,571); Tallahassee, FL |
ACC regular season
| January 1; 4:00 p.m., ESPNU | No. 15 | at Louisville | L 69–79 | 10–4 (0–1) | 22 – Bulgak | 8 – James | 7 – Brown | KFC Yum! Center (9,126); Louisville, KY |
| January 7; 7:00 p.m., ESPN3 | No. 19 | Boston College | W 75–42 | 11–4 (1–1) | 14 – Tied | 9 – Bulgak | 6 – Bingley | Donald L. Tucker Center (2,665); Tallahassee, FL |
| January 10; 4:00 p.m., RSN | No. 19 | Georgia Tech | W 75–69 | 12–4 (2–1) | 32 – Thomas | 14 – Thomas | 4 – Brown | Donald L. Tucker Center (3,906); Tallahassee, FL |
| January 14; 7:00 p.m. | No. 16 | at Clemson | W 85–40 | 13–4 (3–1) | 18 – Tied | 9 – Bulgak | 5 – Brown | Jervey Athletic Center (584); Clemson, SC |
| January 17; 2:00 p.m., ESPN3 | No. 16 | at Pittsburgh | W 66–55 | 14–4 (4–1) | 18 – Romero | 12 – Bulgak | 6 – Romero | Peterson Events Center (2,316); Pittsburgh, PA |
| January 21; 7:00 p.m., ESPN3 | No. 14 | Virginia | W 70–48 | 15–4 (5–1) | 20 – Thomas | 10 – Slaughter | 7 – Romero | Donald L. Tucker Center (2,495); Tallahassee, FL |
| January 24; 1:00 p.m., ESPN3 | No. 14 | at No. 16 Miami (FL) | W 69–58 | 16–4 (6–1) | 19 – Romero | 8 – Thomas | 6 – Romero | BankUnited Center (2,313); Coral Gables, FL |
| January 28; 7:00 p.m., ESPN3 | No. 11 | at Wake Forest | W 96–55 | 17–4 (7–1) | 22 – Brown | 9 – Brown | 11 – Brown | LJVM Coliseum (670); Winston-Salem, NC |
| January 31; 2:00 p.m., ESPN3 | No. 11 | Virginia Tech | W 68–50 | 18–4 (8–1) | 22 – Thomas | 7 – Bulgak | 3 – Tied | Donald L. Tucker Center (3,017); Tallahassee, FL |
| February 7; 2:00 p.m., ESPN3 | No. 10 | Clemson | W 75–56 | 19–4 (9–1) | 17 – Thomas | 7 – Tied | 6 – Romero | Donald L. Tucker Center (3,138); Tallahassee, FL |
| February 11; 7:00 p.m., ESPN3 | No. 10 | at Duke | W 69–53 | 20–4 (10–1) | 14 – Thomas | 8 – James | 6 – Romero | Cameron Indoor Stadium (4,536); Durham, NC |
| February 14; 2:00 p.m., ESPN2 | No. 10 | North Carolina | W 94–63 | 21–4 (11–1) | 19 – Bulgak | 14 – Bulgak | 5 – Tied | Donald L. Tucker Center (3,534); Tallahassee, FL |
| February 18; 7:00 p.m., RSN | No. 10 | at No. 23 Syracuse | L 73–83 | 21–5 (11–2) | 23 – Bulgak | 12 – Brown | 7 – Romero | Carrier Dome (1,532); Syracuse, NY |
| February 22; 7:00 p.m., ESPN2 | No. 12 | No. 2 Notre Dame | L 66–73 | 21–6 (11–3) | 15 – Slaughter | 10 – Slaughter | 3 – Tied | Donald L. Tucker Center (5,319); Tallahassee, FL |
| February 25; 7:30 p.m. | No. 12 | at NC State | W 56–52 | 22–6 (12–3) | 19 – Thomas | 9 – Brown | 4 – Tied | Broughton HS (1,656); Raleigh, NC |
| February 28; 3:00 p.m., ESPN2 | No. 12 | No. 17 Miami (FL) | W 70–67 | 23–6 (13–3) | 24 – Romero | 6 – Slaughter | 4 – Romero | Donald L. Tucker Center (3,945); Tallahassee, FL |
ACC Women's Tournament
| March 4; 11:00 a.m., ACCN | No. 14 (4) | vs. No. 21 (5) Miami (FL); Quarterfinals | L 56–74 | 23–7 | 14 – Tied | 12 – Slaughter | 5 – Brown | Greensboro Coliseum (3,148); Greensboro, NC |
NCAA Women's Tournament
| March 19*; 1:30 p.m., ESPN2 | (5 D) No. 17 | vs. (12 D) Middle Tennessee; First round | W 72–55 | 24–7 | 17 – Romero | 10 – Brown | 4 – Tied | Reed Arena (-); College Station, TX |
| March 21*; 6:30 p.m., ESPN2 | (5 D) No. 17 | at (4 D) No. 18 Texas A&M; Second round | W 74–56 | 25–7 | 18 – Bulgak | 13 – Bulgak | 6 – Romero | Reed Arena (4,013); College Station, TX |
| March 26*; 4:00 p.m., ESPN | (5 D) No. 17 | vs. (1 D) No. 4 Baylor; Sweet Sixteen | L 58–78 | 25–8 | 11 – Romero | 9 – Tied | 6 – Romero | American Airlines Center; Dallas, TX |
*Non-conference game. ^{#}Rankings from AP Poll. (#) Tournament seedings in parentheses. D=Dallas Region. All times are in Eastern Time.

== Awards ==
- ACC Sixth Player of the Year

Shakayla Thomas

=== Watchlists ===
- Naismith Trophy

Adut Bulgak
Leticia Romero

- Wade Trophy

Adut Bulgak

=== Finalists ===
- Senior CLASS Award

Adut Bulgak

=== Honors ===
- ACC Player of the Week
  - Adut Bulgak
  - Shakayla Thomas
- National Player of the Week
  - Shakayla Thomas

==== All-ACC ====
- First Team
  - Shakayla Thomas
- Second Team
  - Adut Bulgak
- Defensive Team
  - Brittany Brown

==== All-Americans ====
- Second Team
  - Adut Bulgak
- Honorable Mention
  - Leticia Romero
  - Shakayla Thomas

=== WNBA draft ===
One player was selected in the 2016 WNBA draft.

| Round | Pick | Name | Team |
|---|---|---|---|
| 1st | 12 | Adut Bulgak | New York Liberty |

== Media ==
All Seminoles games will air on the Seminole IMG Sports Network.
