= Quentin Hillsman =

American basketball coach (born 1970)

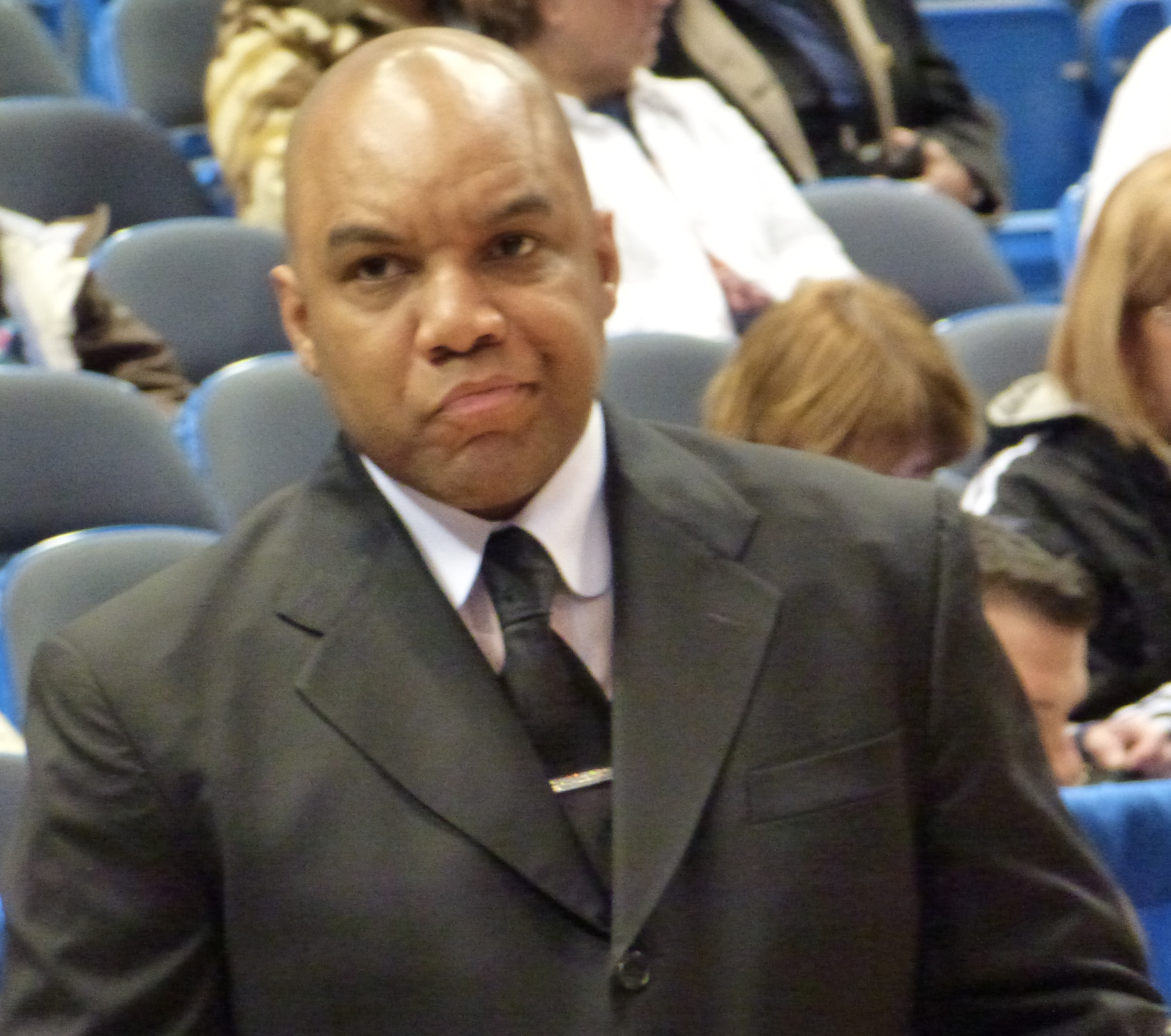
- Hillsman at the Big East tournament in 2012

Current position
- Title: Assistant coach
- Team: Ole Miss
- Conference: SEC

Biographical details
- Born: October 16, 1970 (age 56); Suitland, Maryland, U.S.
- Education: St. Mary's College (Maryland) (B.A.) United States Sports Academy (M.A.)

Coaching career (HC unless noted)
- 1995–1996: St. Mary's (assistant)
- 1999: Newport School
- 1999–2001: Siena (assistant)
- 2001–2002: American University (assistant)
- 2002–2003: Laurinburg Institute
- 2003–2004: The Patterson School
- 2004–2005: Alabama (assistant)
- 2005–2006: Syracuse (assistant)
- 2006–2021: Syracuse
- 2024–present: Ole Miss (assistant)

Head coaching record
- Overall: 319–169 (.654)

Quentin Jerome Hillsman (born October 16, 1970) is an American college basketball coach. He is currently an assistant coach at Ole Miss. He was previously the head women's basketball coach for the Syracuse Orange. He held that position from 2006 to 2021.

== Early life ==
Hillsman was born in Suitland, Maryland. He is the only child of a computer business consultant, Horace Jerome Hillsman, and a music teacher, Joan Rucker Hillsman. After graduating from Forestville High School, Hillsman attended Johnson C. Smith University in Charlotte, North Carolina, before transferring to St. Mary's College of Maryland for his sophomore season. With the Seahawks, he ranked third in assists (330) and eighth in steals (130) and also set the school's single-game and season assist record. After St. Mary's, Hillsman attended the United States Sports Academy from 1994 to 1996 studying sports management. A back injury ended his playing career and he turned to coaching.

== Coaching career ==
Hillsman returned to St. Mary's to be an assistant coach for the men's basketball team. In 1998, he was an associate head coach for the Newport School boys' team before becoming head coach in 1999. He was an assistant coach for both Siena (1999–2001) and American University (2001–02), then head coach for Laurinburg Institute (2002–03) and The Patterson School (2003–04). He was an assistant coach at Alabama (2004–05) before arriving at Syracuse in 2005. There, he was also an assistant coach for a year when he was asked to be a head coach by then director of athletics Daryl Gross.

As the Syracuse head coach, Hillsman has led the Orange to eight consecutive postseason appearances, including four straight NCAA berths, 17 postseason victories and eight straight winning seasons, while winning 65 percent of his games. Hillsman was voted the Big East Conference Coach of the Year in 2008. In the 2015–16 season, his team finished in third place but made it to the ACC women's tournament finals before losing. They received an at-large bid for the NCAA women's tournament, where they advanced to the program's first-ever championship game to play Connecticut, losing 82–51.

In August 2021, Hillsman resigned from his position as the Syracuse University women's basketball head coach after allegations of misconduct.

In September 2021, Hillsman was hired as the head coach by Club Baloncesto Leganés, a professional club in Madrid, Spain, of the Liga Endesa. However, due to visa issues and backlash against his hiring, he ultimately did not go to Spain.

== Legal issues ==
On November 18, 2014, New York's state tax department issued a tax warrant against Hillsman and his wife, claiming they owed $10,865 in overdue personal income tax for 2012. A Syracuse University athletic department spokesman stated that "[t]here was a misunderstanding with a previous accountant... Coach Hillsman is taking the steps to rectify the problem." In 2011, the Hillsman's also owed $14,444 in back taxes, but that debt was later satisfied, according to the tax department.

In 2011, former Syracuse player Lynnae Lampkins accused Hillsman of inappropriate behavior, and her father filed a Title IX sexual harassment complaint against the university. Lampkins originally reported the incident to the university in 2010, stating he inappropriately touched and texted her. However, an independent counsel investigated her accusations and found no evidence of harassment.

In June 2021, an article published in The Athletic alleged that Hillsman would frequently use inappropriate language, regularly and threaten players. On August 2, 2021, Syracuse athletics director John Wildhack announced in a press release that Hillsman had resigned from his position. The Daily Orange reported that two additional administrators were "no longer employed" by the athletic department. University's external investigation into the program found that SU Athletics mishandled concerning behavior and complaints, and a number of players and managers described an unhealthy

== Head coaching record ==
Record table
| Season | Team | Overall | Conference | Standing | Postseason |
|---|---|---|---|---|---|
Syracuse (Big East Conference) (2006–2013)
| 2006–07 | Syracuse | 5-24 | 3–13 | T-13th | |
| 2007–08 | Syracuse | 22–9 | 10–6 | T-5th | NCAA First Round |
| 2008–09 | Syracuse | 17–15 | 5–11 | T-11th | WNIT Second Round |
| 2009–10 | Syracuse | 25–11 | 7–9 | T-8th | WNIT Regional Finals |
| 2010–11 | Syracuse | 25–10 | 9–7 | T-7th | WNIT Regional Finals |
| 2011–12 | Syracuse | 22–15 | 6–10 | T-10th | WNIT Semifinals |
| 2012–13 | Syracuse | 24–8 | 11–5 | T-3rd | NCAA First Round |
| Big East: | | 144–88 (.621) | 51–61 (.455) | | |
Syracuse (Atlantic Coast Conference) (2013–2021)
| 2013–14 | Syracuse | 23–10 | 10–6 | 5th | NCAA Second Round |
| 2014–15 | Syracuse | 22–10 | 11–5 | T-4th | NCAA Second Round |
| 2015–16 | Syracuse | 30–8 | 13–3 | 3rd | NCAA Tournament Runner-up |
| 2016–17 | Syracuse | 22–11 | 11–5 | 6th | NCAA Second Round |
| 2017–18 | Syracuse | 22–9 | 10–6 | T–6th | NCAA First Round |
| 2018–19 | Syracuse | 25–9 | 11–5 | 5th | NCAA Second Round |
| 2019–20 | Syracuse | 16–15 | 9–9 | 8th | Tournament not held |
| 2020–21 | Syracuse | 15–9 | 9–7 | T-4th | NCAA Second Round |
| ACC: | | 175–81 (.684) | 84–46 (.646) | | |
| Total: | | 319–169 (.654) | | | |
