= 2015–16 Syracuse Orange women's basketball team =

Intercollegiate basketball season

2015–16 Syracuse Orange women's basketball

South Point Thanksgiving Shootout champions

NCAA tournament, Runner-Up
- Conference: Atlantic Coast Conference

Ranking
- Coaches: No. 3
- AP: No. 14
- Record: 30–8 (13–3 ACC)
- Head coach: Quentin Hillsman (9th season)
- Assistant coaches: Vonn Read; Tammi Reiss; Cedric Solice
- Home arena: Carrier Dome

2015–16 ACC women's basketball standings
	Conf.				Overall
Team	W		L	PCT	W		L	PCT
No. 2 Notre Dame †	16	–	0	1.000	33	–	2	.943
No. 8 Louisville	15	–	1	.938	26	–	8	.765
No. 14 Syracuse	13	–	3	.813	30	–	8	.789
No. 17 Florida State	13	–	3	.813	25	–	8	.758
No. 19 Miami (FL)	10	–	6	.625	24	–	9	.727
NC State	10	–	6	.625	20	–	11	.645
Duke	8	–	8	.500	20	–	12	.625
Georgia Tech	8	–	8	.500	20	–	13	.606
Virginia	6	–	10	.375	18	–	16	.529
Wake Forest	6	–	10	.375	17	–	16	.515
Virginia Tech	5	–	11	.313	18	–	14	.563
North Carolina	4	–	12	.250	14	–	18	.438
Pittsburgh	4	–	12	.250	13	–	18	.419
Boston College	2	–	14	.125	15	–	16	.484
Clemson	0	–	16	.000	4	–	26	.133
† 2016 ACC tournament winner As of April 5, 2016; Rankings from AP poll

The 2015–16 Syracuse Orange women's basketball team represented Syracuse University during the 2015–16 college basketball season. The Orange, led by ninth-year head coach Quentin Hillsman, were third-year members of the Atlantic Coast Conference and played their home games at the Carrier Dome.

Syracuse finished its regular season with a 23–6 overall record, matching the program record for most regular season wins. The Orange earned their highest finish as a member of the ACC, with a school-record 13 conference victories, and earned a third-seed spot and first-round bye in the conference tournament. Syracuse also received an at-large invitation to the NCAA Tournament, and advanced to the program's first-ever championship game, before losing 82–51 to Connecticut.

== Previous season ==
The Orange finished the 2014–15 season 22–10, 11–5 in ACC play to finish in a tie for fourth place. They lost in the second round of the ACC women's tournament to Wake Forest. They received an at-large bid to the NCAA women's tournament, where they defeated Nebraska in the first round before losing to South Carolina in the second round.

== Roster ==
2015–16 Syracuse Orange women's basketball team
Players
Coaches

Pos.	#	Name	Height	Year	Previous school	Hometown
G	1	Alexis Peterson	5 ft 7 in (1.7 m)	Jr	Northland	Columbus, OH
F	3	Julia Chandler	6 ft 2 in (1.88 m)	Fr	Northern Secondary	Toronto, ON
G	4	Maggie Morrison	5 ft 8 in (1.73 m)	RS Sr	Archbishop Spalding	Millersville, MD
G	5	Jade Phillips	5 ft 11 in (1.8 m)	Fr	Southeast Raleigh	Raleigh, NC
F	10	Isabella Slim	6 ft 0 in (1.83 m)	Jr	CTO Amsterdam	Amsterdam, Netherlands
G	11	Cornelia Fondren	5 ft 8 in (1.73 m)	Sr	Overton	Memphis, TN
G	13	Brianna Butler	5 ft 11 in (1.8 m)	Sr	Nazareth Regional	King of Prussia, PA
G	14	Savannah Crocetti	5 ft 7 in (1.7 m)	Fr	Irondequoit	Rochester, NY
G	20	Brittney Sykes	5 ft 9 in (1.75 m)	RS Jr	University	Newark, NJ
G	21	Danielle Minott	5 ft 8 in (1.73 m)	So	Miami Country Day	Miami, FL
F	22	Taylor Ford	6 ft 0 in (1.83 m)	Sr	Nazareth Regional	Bronx, NY
G	24	Brandi Fowler	5 ft 4 in (1.63 m)	Fr	Corcoran	Syracuse, NY
G	33	Davida Dale	5 ft 9 in (1.75 m)	Fr	St. Andrew's	Providence, RI
G	34	Abby Grant	5 ft 9 in (1.75 m)	Fr	St. Francis	Suwanee, GA
C	50	Briana Day	6 ft 4 in (1.93 m)	Jr	Millbrook	Raleigh, NC
F	55	Bria Day	6 ft 4 in (1.93 m)	Jr	Millbrook	Raleigh, NC

Head coach

- Quentin Hillsman (St. Mary's (MD))

Assistant coach(es)

- Vonn Read (Clark Atlanta)
- Tammi Reiss (Virginia)
- Cedric Solice (Charleston Southern)

Legend

- (C) Team captain
- (S) Suspended
- (I) Ineligible
- (W) Walk-on
- Injured
- Current redshirt

Roster

== Schedule ==
Date time, TV	Rank^{#}	Opponent^{#}	Result	Record	Site (attendance) city, state
Non-conference regular season
11/13/2015*; 5:00 pm	No. 23	at Rhode Island	W 57–54	1–0	Ryan Center (1,196); Kingston, RI
11/20/2015*; 7:00 pm	No. 25	at No. 4 Tennessee	L 55–57	1–1	Thompson–Boling Arena (10,007); Knoxville, TN
11/23/2015*; 7:00 pm	No. 23	Morgan State	W 90–61	2–1	Carrier Dome (451); Syracuse, NY
11/27/2015*; 9:45 pm	No. 23	vs. Washington; South Point Thanksgiving Shootout	W 66–62	3–1	South Point Arena; Enterprise, NV
11/28/2015*; 7:30 pm	No. 23	vs. Fordham; South Point Thanksgiving Shootout	W 76–54	4–1	South Point Arena; Enterprise, NV
12/02/2015*; 7:00 pm, BTN	No. 20	at No. 5 Maryland; ACC–Big Ten Women's Challenge	L 64–82	4–2	Xfinity Center (3,964); College Park, MD
12/06/2015*; 2:00 pm, TWCSC	No. 20	Stony Brook	W 64–49	5–2	Carrier Dome (219); Syracuse, NY
12/09/2015*; 7:00 pm, TWCSC	No. 19	Coppin State	W 88–56	6–2	Carrier Dome (335); Syracuse, NY
12/12/2015*; 1:00 pm, ESPN3	No. 19	No. 24 Arizona State	L 54–61	6–3	Carrier Dome (526); Syracuse, NY
12/21/2015*; 7:00 pm, TWCSC		Jacksonville	W 65–49	7–3	Carrier Dome (404); Syracuse, NY
12/29/2015*; 7:00 pm, ESPN3		Drexel	W 83–62	8–3	Carrier Dome (567); Syracuse, NY
12/30/2015*; 7:00 pm		Howard	W 97–48	9–3	Carrier Dome (464); Syracuse, NY
01/01/2016*; 12:00 pm		Texas–Rio Grande Valley	W 91–32	10–3	Carrier Dome (442); Syracuse, NY
ACC regular season
01/03/2016; 1:00 pm, ESPNU		No. 12 Duke	W 86–50	11–3 (1–0)	Carrier Dome (1,585); Syracuse, NY
01/07/2016; 7:00 pm, ESPN3		at North Carolina	L 73–77	11–4 (1–1)	Carmichael Arena (1,724); Chapel Hill, NC
01/10/2016; 2:00 pm, TWCSC		Virginia Tech	W 60–39	12–4 (2–1)	Carrier Dome (1,961); Syracuse, NY
01/14/2016; 7:00 pm, ESPN3		Pittsburgh	W 71–48	13–4 (3–1)	Carrier Dome (424); Syracuse, NY
01/17/2016; 2:00 pm		at Wake Forest	W 91–65	14–4 (4–1)	LJVM Coliseum (529); Winston-Salem, NC
01/21/2016; 7:00 pm, ESPN3		at No. 3 Notre Dame	L 62–90	14–5 (4–2)	Edmund P. Joyce Center (8,312); South Bend, IN
01/25/2016; 7:00 pm, RSN		No. 14 Louisville	L 53–71	14–6 (4–3)	Carrier Dome (549); Syracuse, NY
01/27/2016; 7:00 pm, TWCSC		Boston College	W 62–61	15–6 (5–3)	Carrier Dome (375); Syracuse, NY
02/01/2016; 7:00 pm, RSN		at No. 16 Miami (FL)	W 57–51	16–6 (6–3)	BankUnited Center (745); Coral Gables, FL
02/04/2016; 7:00 pm, TWCSC		Clemson	W 83–62	17–6 (7–3)	Carrier Dome (407); Syracuse, NY
02/07/2016; 2:00 pm, ESPN3		Georgia Tech	W 71–52	18–6 (8–3)	Carrier Dome (1,490); Syracuse, NY
02/11/2016; 7:00 pm, RSN		at Virginia	W 91–57	19–6 (9–3)	John Paul Jones Arena (3,081); Charlottesville, VA
02/14/2016; 2:00 pm		at NC State	W 55–52	20–6 (10–3)	Broughton HS (2,811); Raleigh, NC
02/18/2016; 7:00 pm, RSN	No. 23	No. 10 Florida State	W 83–73	21–6 (11–3)	Carrier Dome (1,535); Syracuse, NY
02/21/2016; 3:00 pm, RSN	No. 23	at Pittsburgh	W 70–56	22–6 (12–3)	Peterson Events Center (4,151); Pittsburgh, PA
02/25/2016; 7:00 pm	No. 18	at Boston College	W 71–55	23–6 (13–3)	Conte Forum (718); Chestnut Hill, MA
ACC Women's Tournament
03/04/2016; 8:00 pm, RSN	No. 17	vs. NC State; Quarterfinals	W 80–61	24–6	Greensboro Coliseum (5,034); Greensboro, NC
03/05/2016; 2:30 pm, ESPNU	No. 17	vs. No. 7 Louisville; Semifinals	W 80–75	25–6	Greensboro Coliseum (5,871); Greensboro, NC
03/06/2016; 12:30 pm, ESPN	No. 17	vs. No. 2 Notre Dame; Championship Game	L 57–68	25–7	Greensboro Coliseum (5,017); Greensboro, NC
NCAA Women's Tournament
03/18/2016*; 2:30 pm, ESPN2	(4 SF) No. 14	(13 SF) Army; First Round	W 73–56	26–7	Carrier Dome (2,445); Syracuse, NY
03/20/2016*; 12:00 pm, ESPN2	(4 SF) No. 14	(12 SF) Albany; Second Round	W 76–59	27–7	Carrier Dome (3,842); Syracuse, NY
03/25/2016*; 7:00 pm, ESPN	(4 SF) No. 14	vs. (1 SF) No. 3 South Carolina; Sweet Sixteen	W 80–72	28–7	Denny Sanford Premier Center (4,610); Sioux Falls, SD
03/27/2016*; 3:30 pm, ESPN	(4 SF) No. 14	vs. (7 SF) Tennessee; Elite Eight	W 89–67	29–7	Denny Sanford Premier Center (4,055); Sioux Falls, SD
04/03/2016*; 8:30 pm, ESPN2	(4 SF) No. 14	vs. (7 L) Washington; Final Four	W 80–59	30–7	Bankers Life Fieldhouse (15,227); Indianapolis, IN
04/05/2016*; 8:30 pm, ESPN	(4 SF) No. 14	vs. (1 B) No. 1 Connecticut; Championship Game	L 51–82	30–8	Bankers Life Fieldhouse (14,514); Indianapolis, IN
*Non-conference game. ^{#}Rankings from AP Poll. (#) Tournament seedings in parentheses. SF=Sioux Falls Region. All times are in Eastern.

== Rankings ==
Ranking movement Legend: ██ Increase in ranking. ██ Decrease in ranking. ██ Not ranked the previous week. RV=Received votes.
Poll	Pre- season	Week 1	Week 2	Week 3	Week 4	Week 5	Week 6	Week 7	Week 8	Week 9	Week 10	Week 11	Week 12	Week 13	Week 14	Week 15	Week 16	Week 17	Week 18	Week 19	Final
AP	23	25	23	20	19	RV	RV	RV	RV	RV	RV	RV	RV	NR	RV	23	18	17	14	14	N/A
Coaches	RV	RV	RV	25	25	RV	RV	RV	RV	25	RV	24	RV	23	22	18	18	17	15	15	3

== See also ==
- 2015–16 Syracuse Orange men's basketball team
