= Altaf Khanani =

Pakistani convicted in the U.S. of money laundering

- الطاف خانانی
- Born: 2 May 1961 (age 65); Karachi, Sindh, Pakistan
- Occupations: Money launderer and criminal
- Criminal penalty: 68 months in prison
- Criminal status: Released
- Children: 5

Altaf Sattar Khanani (Urdu: الطاف خانانی, romanized: Alt̤āf Xānānī; born 2 May 1961) is a Pakistani money launderer who as the founder of the foreign exchange company Khanani & Kalia International was involved in moving money for terrorist groups and criminal gangs. After serving three years in a US prison he was released in July 2020.

== Early life and family ==
He was born in 1961 to a Memon family who were originally from Gujarat, India before migrating to Pakistan after independence. His father Abdul Sattar Khanani was a street dealer and businessman. He was the twin brother of Javed Khanani and with him was involved in money laundering through Khanani and Kalia International. His brother reportedly committed suicide in 2016.

== Money laundering ==
Khanani's money laundering organisation was involved in the illicit international movement of money between, among others, Pakistan, the United Arab Emirates, United States, United Kingdom, Canada, and Australia. Among the methods used was the traditional hawala system. The organization moved money for drug cartels, biker gangs, Hezbollah, al-Qaeda.

== Arrest ==
Khanani was arrested in September 2016 in Panama by the US Drug Enforcement Administration, and transported to jail in the United States. He was indicted in the US District Court of the Southern District of Florida on fourteen counts of money laundering in June 2015. In a plea bargain, Khanani pleaded guilty to a single count of conspiracy to commit laundering. His sentence included 68 months in prison, a $250,000 fine, blacklisting by the United States along with his son Obaid Khanani and nephew Hozaifa Khanani, and his money laundering network has been designated as a transnational criminal organization under the SDN by the United States Department of the Treasury's Office of Foreign Assets Control. Its addresses included Australia, Canada, Pakistan, United Arab Emirates, United Kingdom and United States. Khanani was released from prison on July 13, 2020.

== In popular culture ==
He is portrayed by Mushtaq Naika in the 2025 Indian spy action thriller Dhurandhar, which is based on the 2008 Mumbai attacks along with the IC 814: The Kandahar Hijack.

== See also ==
- Pakistan Forex scam case, involving money laundering by the Khanani brothers and Khanani & Kalia International
