= 2015–16 UConn Huskies women's basketball team =

Intercollegiate basketball season

2015–16 UConn Huskies women's basketball

NCAA tournament National champions AAC Tournament champions AAC regular season champions
- Conference: American Athletic Conference

Ranking
- Coaches: No. 1
- AP: No. 1
- Record: 38–0 (18–0 The American)
- Head coach: Geno Auriemma (31st season)
- Associate head coach: Chris Dailey
- Assistant coaches: Shea Ralph; Marisa Moseley
- Home arena: Harry A. Gampel Pavilion; XL Center

2015–16 American Athletic Conference women's basketball standings
	Conf.				Overall
Team	W		L	PCT	W		L	PCT
No. 1 UConn †	18	–	0	1.000	38	–	0	1.000
No. 21 South Florida	14	–	4	.778	24	–	10	.706
Temple	13	–	5	.722	23	–	12	.657
Memphis	12	–	6	.667	18	–	13	.581
Tulane	11	–	7	.611	23	–	12	.657
Tulsa	8	–	10	.444	12	–	19	.387
SMU	7	–	11	.389	13	–	18	.419
East Carolina	6	–	12	.333	13	–	19	.406
Cincinnati	4	–	14	.222	8	–	22	.267
UCF	4	–	14	.222	7	–	23	.233
Houston	2	–	16	.111	6	–	24	.200
† American Tournament winner As of April 5, 2016; Rankings from AP poll

The 2015–16 UConn Huskies women's basketball team represented the University of Connecticut in the 2015–16 NCAA Division I women's basketball season. The Huskies, led by 31st-year head coach Geno Auriemma, won the NCAA tournament and went undefeated. With their eleventh championship win in 2016, the UConn Huskies became the first NCAA Division I women's basketball team to win four straight national championships.

== Media ==
Every single Connecticut game was expected to be televised. Excluding exhibitions, every Connecticut home game and most conference games aired on SNY with a simulcast on Husky Vision. Select games aired on ESPN3, another ESPN Network, or CBS Sports Network. Every game was once again broadcast on the UConn IMG Sports Network, with an extra audio broadcast available online through Husky Vision.

== Off-season ==
=== FIBA Americas U16 Championship ===
Andra Espinoza-Hunter, who had committed to play for Connecticut in 2017, played for the USA team at the 2015 FIBA Americas U16 Championship held in Puebla, Mexico. Espinoza-Hunter played for Blair Academy, and had previously played for Ossining High School, where she was a teammate of Saniya Chong. The USA team won their preliminary games, but lost in the semifinals to Brazil. They defeated the host team, Mexico, to earn the bronze medal. In the bronze medal game, Espinoza-Hunter scored ten points, one of four players in double figures.

=== FIBA Under-19 World Championship for Women ===
UConn commits Napheesa Collier and Crystal Dangerfield both played at the 2015 FIBA Under-19 World Championship for Women, held in Chekhov, Russia from 8 to 26 July 2015. The USA team won all seven games to win the gold medal. In the semi-final against Spain, Collier had 24 points on 10 of 13 shooting from the field. Collier was named to the five player all-tournament squad.

=== Pan Am games ===
Three UConn players participated in basketball at the 2015 Pan American Games held in Toronto, Ontario, Canada from July 10 to 26, 2015. Breanna Stewart and Moriah Jefferson played for the USA team, while Kia Nurse played for the Canadian team.

Canada opened the preliminary rounds with an easy 101–38 win over Venezuela. The following day they beat Argentina 73–58. The final preliminary game was against Cuba; both teams were 2–0, so the winner would win the group. The game went down to the wire, with Canada eking out a 71–68 win. Canada faced Brazil in the semifinal.

Everything seemed to go right in the semifinal game. Canada opened the game with an 11–2 run on seven consecutive points by Miranda Ayim. Miah-Marie Langlois contributed five assists. In the third quarter, Canada strongly out-rebounded Brazil and hit 69% of their field goals to score 33 points in the quarter. Lizanne Murphy and Nirra Fields hit three-pointers to help extend the lead to 68–39 at the end of three quarters. Canada continued to dominate in the fourth quarter with three-pointers by Nurse and Kim Gaucher. Canada won the game 91–63 to earn a spot in the gold-medal game against the USA.

The gold-medal game matched up the host team Canada against USA, in a sold-out arena dominated by fans in red and white and waving the Canadian flag. The Canadian team, arm in arm, sang "O Canada" as the respective national anthems were played.

After trading baskets early, the US edged out to a double-digit lead in the second quarter. However, the Canadians, spurred on by the home crowd cheering, fought back and tied up the game at halftime. In the third quarter, it was Canada's time to shine as they outscored the US 26–15. The lead reached as high as 18 points. The USA fought back, but Canada won the game and the gold medal 81–73. It was Canada's first gold medal in basketball in the Pan Am games. Kia Nurse was the star for Canada, with 33 points, hitting 11 of her 12 free-throw attempts in 10 of her 17 field-goal attempts, including two of three three-pointers.

Stewart was the leading scorer for the US in the gold-medal game with 17 points. She recorded a double double with 11 rebounds to go along with her points. Jefferson was the third leading scorer for the USA team, with 14 points.

=== FIBA Americas Women's Championship 2015 ===
Nurse played for Canada at the 2015 FIBA Americas Women's Championship, a qualifying event used to determine invitations to the 2016 Olympics. The games were held in Edmonton, Alberta, Canada in August, 2015. Canada was assigned to Group A and played Puerto Rico, Chile, the Dominican Republic and Cuba in the preliminary rounds. Canada won the first three games easily, with a 94–57 win over Puerto Rico as the closest match. The final preliminary round game was against undefeated Cuba, a team Canada had faced in the Pan Am games. Cuba played well in that event and was expected to challenge Canada. However, Canada defeated Cuba 92–43 to win first place in the group for a spot in the semifinal against the second-place team in group B, Brazil. Nurse was the leading scorer for Canada, with 14 points in the game.

The semifinal game against Brazil was much closer. Canada led by only six points at halftime but gradually expanded the lead to end up with an 83–66 win, and a spot in the gold-medal game. With teammate Shona Thorburn sidelined with an injury, Nurse played 35 minutes, the most of any player on the team. The gold-medal game was a rematch with Cuba, who won their semifinal game against Argentina. Despite the lopsided result in the preliminary rounds, Canada expected a closer game. Cuba started off strong and had an eight-point lead early in the game. Canada responded with a 16–0 run to take over the lead, but Cuba took a small lead early in the second half. Canada took the lead back and gradually expanded the lead to end up with the win, 82–66. As the game wound down to the close, the crowd was chanting "Rio, Rio, Rio" in recognition of the fact that the win would qualify Canada for the Olympics in Rio in 2016. Nurse was the leading scorer for Canada with 20 points, and her overall performance earned her the MVP award for the entire event.

== Roster ==
2015–16 Connecticut Huskies women's basketball team
Players
Coaches

Pos.	#	Name	Height	Year	Hometown
G	2	Briana Pulido	5 ft 7 in (1.7 m)	Sr	Miami, FL
F	3	Morgan Tuck	6 ft 2 in (1.88 m)	RS Jr	Bolingbrook, IL
G	4	Moriah Jefferson	5 ft 7 in (1.7 m)	Sr	Glenn Heights, TX
G	11	Kia Nurse	6 ft 0 in (1.83 m)	So	Hamilton, ON
G	12	Saniya Chong	5 ft 8 in (1.73 m)	Jr	Ossining, NY
G	15	Gabby Williams	5 ft 11 in (1.8 m)	So	Sparks, NV
G	20	Tierney Lawlor	5 ft 7 in (1.7 m)	Jr	Ansonia, CT
G	22	Courtney Ekmark	6 ft 0 in (1.83 m)	So	Phoenix, AZ
G/F	24	Napheesa Collier	6 ft 1 in (1.85 m)	Fr	O'Fallon, MO
F	30	Breanna Stewart	6 ft 4 in (1.93 m)	Sr	North Syracuse, NY
G/F	33	Katie Lou Samuelson	6 ft 3 in (1.91 m)	Fr	Huntington Beach, CA
F	35	De'Janae Boykin (injured)	6 ft 2 in (1.88 m)	Fr	Springdale, MD
C	51	Natalie Butler	6 ft 5 in (1.96 m)	RS So	Fairfax Station, VA

Head coach

- Geno Auriemma (West Chester)

Assistant coach(es)

- Chris Dailey (Rutgers)
- Shea Ralph (Connecticut)
- Marisa Moseley (Boston University)

Legend

- (C) Team captain
- (S) Suspended
- (I) Ineligible
- (W) Walk-on
- Injured
- Current redshirt

Roster
Last update: 03-19–2021

De'Janae Boykin was only on the roster for the fall semester, after which she transferred from UConn.

== Games ==
=== Exhibition ===
==== Lubbock Christian ====
The opening exhibition game was played against the Lady Chaps from Lubbock Christian University. The Huskies trailed early, but got untracked quickly, behind 25 points from Stewart, and cruised to a 95–39 win. After the game, Auriemma went to the public address microphone to praise both the team and the fans who made the trip, saying "Their fans were great. That’s a long way for them to travel, and they did. It was way better than a lot of exhibition games we’ve had."

Lubbock Christian would go on to win the Division II national title this season, completing an unbeaten season in its first year of NCAA postseason eligibility after transitioning from the NAIA.

==== Vanguard ====
The game outcome was never in doubt–only the final margin of 80 points in the 98–18 win was unknown–but the interesting aspect of the game was neither the opponents nor the outcome, but the rules. The teams agreed to use experimental rules, largely following the European set of rules. This included use of a larger ball, often call the men's ball, as well as a wider lane, a 24–second shot clock, and an 8-second count to cross into the front court. The international distance of 22 feet 1 inch for the three-point line was used rather than the usual 20 feet 9 inches. The experiment was undertaken to provide information to those who might support the inclusion of the rules into regular-season playing rules.

=== Regular season ===
==== Ohio State ====
Ohio's State's coach Kevin McGuff wanted to challenge his team, although circumstances created a larger challenge than he had intended. He scheduled the number two team in the country South Carolina, then was invited to participate in an early season event that included a game against the number one UConn team, which meant he had to play the number two and number one teams back to back. His team played well against South Carolina, ending up with an 88–80 loss. The result wasn't as close against the Huskies. UConn opened up early with several points, but Ohio State responded, cutting the lead to just three points late in the first quarter; the Huskies then took over. UConn led 50–24 at the half and ended up with 100 points against 56 for Ohio State. Both Stewart and Jefferson scored over 20 points with Stewart scoring 24 and Jefferson scoring 21.

==== Kansas State ====
The Huskies took on the Kansas State Wildcats in the second game, on the 30th anniversary of Geno Auriemma's first game, a win against Iona. Breanna Stewart was the leading scorer with 25 points, one of which helped her reach the 2000 career point plateau, making her the 10th all-time scoring leader at UConn. The Huskies led throughout the game, and won by a margin of 40 points, 97–57.

==== Nebraska ====
For the first time on the season, UConn found itself trailing. It was very early in the game, but Nebraska had a 7–3 lead. The lead did not last long. Stewart hit her first nine baskets and ended up with 25 points. She also recorded 10 rebounds, three assists, and three blocked shots, helping the Huskies dominate the Huskers and cruise to an 88–46 win.

==== Chattanooga ====
UConn played Chattanooga at their home court on 30 November. At the time Chattanooga was coached by Jim Foster, who as the head coach of the St. Joseph's women's basketball team in 1978 had hired Geno Auriemma as an assistant, Auriemma's first coaching position. Almost 40 years later, Jim Foster asked Auriemma for a chance to play Connecticut. The game itself was notable for the defense; the Huskies held Chattanooga to 31 points. The game was reasonably close early on. Queen Alford hit a three-pointer early in the third quarter to cut Chattanooga's deficit to only 11, at 37–26, but the Mocs would only manage one more score in the quarter. Connecticut went on a 23–2 run to extend the lead to 32 points, ultimately winning by a score of 79–31.

==== DePaul ====
UConn faced DePaul, a team they had regularly played when both were in the Big East; it was now an out-of-conference game. DePaul came into the game ranked # 23 and having won their prior two games by a combined margin of almost 100 points. DePaul's coach Doug Bruno used hockey style subbing, taking out all five players and sending in five new players, to keep the players fresh. DePaul is a proficient three-point shooting team, and hit six of their first twelve three-point attempts. UConn led by seven at one point, but the Blue Demons came back to take a one-point lead 34–33. The Huskies led at the half, but only by three points, 44–41. The game remained close until Katie Lou Samuelson, who had hardly played in the first three quarters, came in and scored ten points in the final quarter to help put the game out of reach. UConn won the game 86–70.

==== Notre Dame ====
The next game, against Notre Dame, represented a rematch of the two teams in the prior year's national championship game. Playing without Taya Reimer and Briana Turner, Notre Dame opted for a guard-oriented, perimeter offense. They tied a school record with 13 three-pointers in the game. Marina Mabrey scored 21 points in the first half for the Irish. UConn's Jefferson announced at halftime she would guard Mabrey in the second half, and Mabrey subsequently only scored two points in the half. Stewart was the leading scorer with 28 points, but Tuck had 21 points, along with eight assists and seven rebounds. The Huskies won by ten points, 91–81.

==== Colgate ====
Auriemma likes to schedule a game near the hometown of seniors. The logical choice for Syracuse native Stewart would be Syracuse, but they declined, so an arrangement was made to play nearby Colgate. The small arena (capacity 1,782) was sold out for the event. The Raiders were unable to keep up with the Huskies, but did manage to accomplish something that recent opponents had exploited, namely, hitting three-pointers. Colgate's Paige Kriftcher had a total of nine three-pointers in her first six games, but went 7 for 8 on the evening. However, the rest of the team was unable to match her performance, and the team scored 50 points to Uconn's 94. Stewart performed well in the game before friends and family, hitting seven of her nine shot attempts for 22 points. Her ten assists gave her a double-double, and she also had seven rebounds, four steals, and two blocks.

==== Florida State ====
UConn faced Florida State in the Hall of Fame Women's Showcase played at the Mohegan Sun Arena. The Seminoles were ranked #11, and came in with a seven-game winning streak. However, the Huskies had a balanced offense, led by Tuck with 18 points, and Stewart with 16, Jefferson with 15, and Nurse with 14; the quartet was more than enough to counter Florida State. The Huskies hit almost 56% of their shot attempts, and went on to win their 45th consecutive game 73–49.

==== LSU ====
LSU came to Hartford to play UConn at the XL center. Both teams were playing with shortened rosters. The Huskies' Butler had not played yet, following thumb surgery; she was expected to be ready in December, but still had not yet played. Chong had suffered IT band issues with her legs and was unable to play. Stewart sustained an ankle injury in practice, and was held out as a precaution. However, LSU also had several players out. Both Raigyne Moncrief and Ayana Mitchell had season ending surgery; coach Nikki Fargas held an open tryout to add players, and chose Constance Quinn, a softball player. Unfortunately, playing UConn short-handed with new players is not a recipe for success. Even with some of the Huskies being sidelined, UConn played solid defense, holding LSU scoreless for a six-minute stretch at one time, and held them to just under 26% field goal shooting. The Huskies won easily, 86–40.

==== Maryland ====
Connecticut and Maryland played in the Maggie Dixon Classic, held in Madison Square Garden. The Terrapins were ranked sixth in the polls, but the Huskies started out strong, opening up a seven-point lead at the end of the first quarter. Maryland responded in the second quarter, first tying the game at 21 points apiece, then taking a lead 29–27. With two minutes to go in the half, Maryland held a slim, three-point lead, but the Huskies scored the last seven points of the half to go into halftime up 36–34.

Connecticut continued the run in the opening minutes of the second half, scoring the first four points of the period, but Maryland responded, and retook the lead. The Huskies responded as well, retook the lead, and extended it to twelve points. The Terrapins chipped away at the lead, and cut it to four points with just over a minute to go in the game, when Chong, playing for the first time in four games, nailed a three-pointer to extend the lead to seven. Maryland's Brionna Jones would hit 12 of her 14 field goal attempts and score 22 points, but it was not enough. Maryland would make one more basket, but five three throws by Connecticut extended the final margin to double digits, and a win 81–71.

==== Cincinnati (away) ====
The next game was against Cincinnati, coached by former UConn player and coach Jamelle Elliott. Despite the relationship, Auriemma did not ease up on the Bearcats. Eight Huskies scored in double digits, and UConn went on to win the game easily, 107–45. The game was notable for factors other than the outcome. Uconn's Natalie Butler had transferred from Georgetown, and so had sat out the required full year, but then had a thumb injury, requiring surgery and rehabilitation. She finally got to play, nearly 18 months after her last game. She did not take long to make her presence known, scoring 21 seconds after entering the game. She ended up with eleven points, hitting five of her seven shots, recording, eight rebounds, blocking two shots. The other notable event was that Stewart, who had passed Diana Taurasi on the UConn scoring list the previous Monday, scored enough to pass Kalena Mosqueda Lewis, Nykesha Sales and Kerry Bascom. She moved to third on UConn's all-time scoring list, trailing only Tina Charles and Maya Moore.

==== Tulsa (home) ====
Jefferson did not play in the game against Tulsa, due to a hamstring injury. She had played in all 129 previous games, and had recorded 90 consecutive starts. Chong, still recovering from a leg injury, started in her place, and scored a season-high 18 points. Tuck also scored 18 points, 16 in the first half. The Huskies shot just over 50% from the field and held the Golden Hurricane to under 27%. UConn won its 49th consecutive game 95–35.

==== Houston ====
Houston had only four wins against ten losses when they started their game against UConn; no one gave them a legitimate shot at a win. A very early small lead wasn't a surprise, but the lead grew to seven points in the first quarter, giving some hope to the Houston fans in attendance. Even though Houston led at the end of the first quarter, the Huskies had started a 15–0 run that would take back the lead. Although the Cougars would manage a 5–0 run at the end of that run, the Huskies settled down, put together another run (11–0) in the third period and ended with a win 76–37. Tuck did not play with soreness in her leg. Jefferson had missed the prior game, but was back in the line-up. Butler had seven rebounds in her third game back after recovering from thumb surgery.

==== South Florida (away) ====
South Florida was the only other ranked team in the American Conference. The game in Tampa started out promisingly for the Bulls, as Kitija Laksa, who had scored 38 points in her previous game, hit her first two three-pointers of the game to give the Bulls an 8–2 lead. They extended the lead to eight points at 14–6, but Stewart and Nurse ht threes to start a 14–1 run by the Huskies to retake the lead. The Bulls cut the lead to a single point in the third quarter on two more threes by Laksa, but UConn responded with seven straight points. In the fourth quarter, Jefferson, Tuck and Samuelson each hit a three in the opening two minutes of the quarter to open up the lead to 18. Although South Florida would cut a 21-point lead to 12 later in the period, they would not get any closer and UConn finished with their 51st consecutive win, 75–59.

==== Memphis (away) ====
Despite winning by large margins at Houston and South Florida, the Huskies started out slowly in each game, trailing at the end of the first quarter against Houston, and by eight points to South Florida in the first quarter. In the game against Memphis, the team started out better, leading 11–4 early, and scoring 13 consecutive points shortly thereafter. The lead reached 20 points before the end of the quarter. Jefferson had noticed a tendency to shoot with her elbow out, corrected the motion, and hit seven of her eight field goal attempts, leading to a team high 21 points. UConn went on to win 86–46.

==== Temple (home) ====
Playing in only its second game on campus for the season, Samuelson got her second start of the year. She responded by scoring 21 points, a new career high, along with six assists. Her coach noted she had been playing better in games as well as in practices. As a 6' 3" guard, she also opened up the middle of the floor for Stewart, as the Owls needed to guard Samuelson on the perimeter. Stewart hit nine of her eleven field goals attempts and scored 22. The score was tied at five points apiece when the Huskies scored 24 consecutive points. The team hit almost 55% of their field goal attempts, and tied a season high with 13 three-pointers, leading to 104 points, while holding Temple to 49.

==== UCF ====
UConn played Central Florida without Tuck, who was out for two weeks to rest a sore knee. Six different players reached double figures, including Natalie Butler, who scored 20 points on nine of eleven shooting, the highest point total in her UConn career. She played without her bandage for the first time this year. Williams had 19 points, while hitting nine of eleven shots. Jefferson was questionable, following a knee and head injury in practice, but played 21 minutes. The Huskies won 106–51.

==== SMU (away) ====
Dallas native Jefferson scored 19 points in home of a home crowd court. Stewart just missed a triple double, with 15 points, 12 rebounds and 9 blocks, while playing only 26 minutes. The Huskies hit over 50% of their shots, while holding the Mustangs to 25% shooting. UConn won 90–37, their 55th consecutive win, breaking a tie with Louisiana Tech for the third longest winning streak in NCAA DI women's basketball (Connecticut holds the first and second places, at 90 and 70 respectively).

==== Tulsa (away) ====
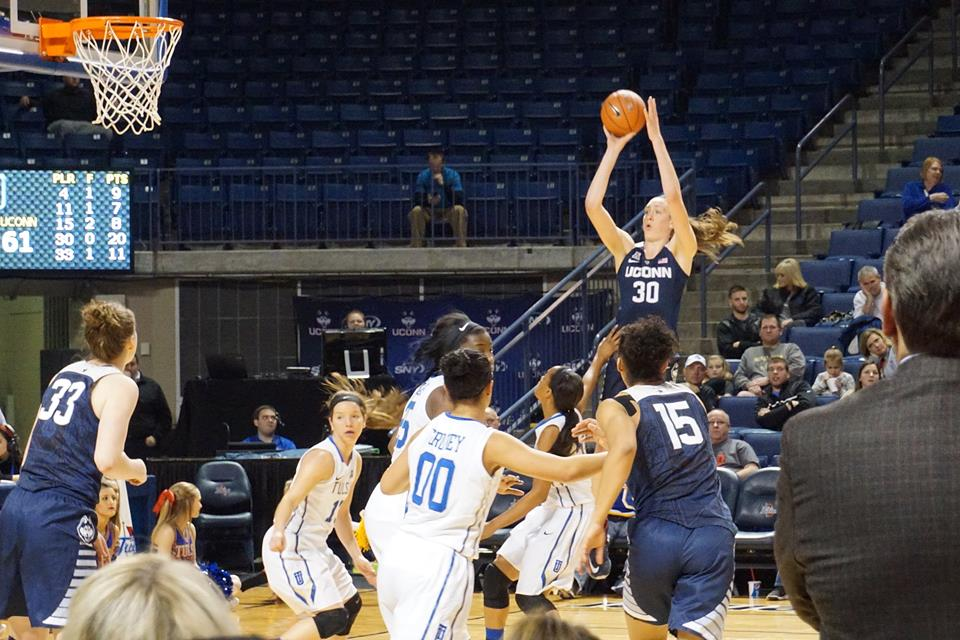
Breanna Stewart elevating to take a shot

Connecticut held Tulsa to just three points in the opening quarter, and the game result was never in doubt. The Huskies outscored the Golden Hurricane by 64 points to win 94–30, but the win wasn't the story of the day—Stewart came into the game with 997 career rebounds and reached the 1,000 career rebound level. She is one of only six Huskies to score at least 1,000 points and record 1,000 rebounds in her career.

==== Memphis (home) ====
In the game against Memphis, five Huskies scored in double digits, led by Stewart's 19 points. UConn recorded assists on 25 of their 32 baskets, hit 58% of their field goal attempts, as well as all ten free throws. The 19 turnovers was one of the few "downsides" in the box score, as Connecticut won their 57th consecutive game 83–40.

==== Tulane (away) ====
The Huskies took on Tulane at their arena. Stewart, who was only 16 points away from second place (held by Tina Charles) on the Huskies all-time scoring list. She scored the first six points of the game and scored or recorded an assist on nine of the twelve baskets scored in the quarter. She reached second place on two free throws late in the first half. Tulane had the second best defense in the conference, holding teams to under 61 points in a game. The Huskies scored 63 by halftime. Tuck played in the game after missing four games with knee soreness, with eleven points and five rebounds in 16 minutes of play. The Huskies defeated the Green Wave 96–38.

==== East Carolina (home) ====
Connecticut played at Gampel Arena for only the third time for the season, taking on East Carolina. Nurse, who had been scoreless in the previous game, scored a season-high 20 points as the Huskies defeated the Pirates 92–46. Briana Pulido made a steal near midcourt, which led to a lay-up late in the game.

==== South Carolina ====
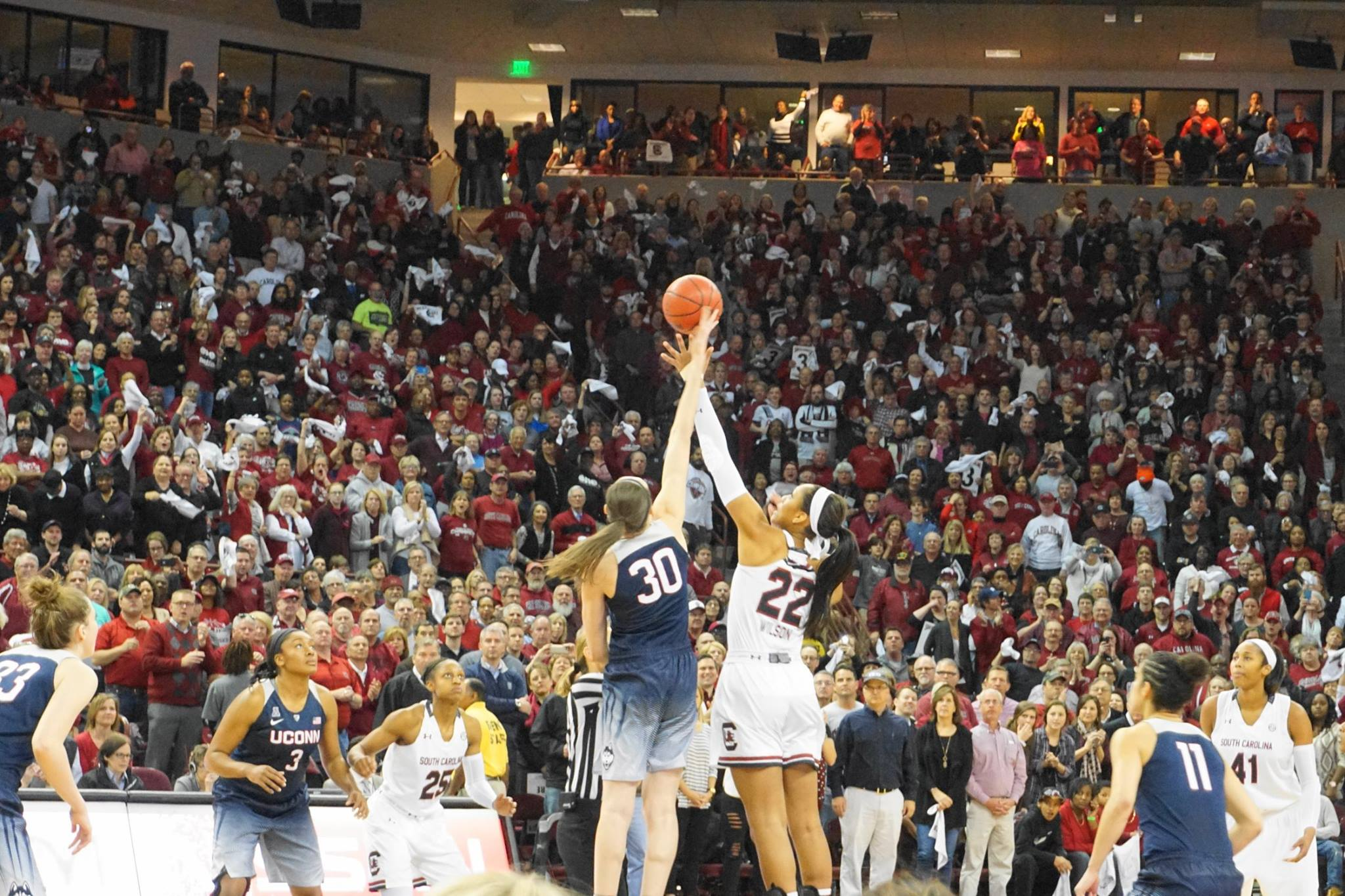
Tipoff at sold-out South Carolina arena; game between UConn and South Carolina

The match-up between Connecticut and South Carolina featured the top two teams in the country. The two teams had met the previous year, in Storrs, ranked first and second, although South Carolina was the number one team at the time. Coach Auriemma compared the ascendance of the Gamecocks to the path of the 1995 UConn team, which went on to win the national championship, noting that in some ways, the South Carolina team was further along in its development. The game was played in front of a sell-out crowd of 18,000 fans, some of whom were lined up by noon to get in to the seven o'clock game. The Gamecocks were expected to take advantage of their strong frontcourt duo of A'ja Wilson and Alaina Coates, but Tuck's defense against Coates limited her to only two points. Tuck scored 16 points herself, Stewart added 25, and Jefferson "tired out the Gamecocks guards with her relentlessness". The Huskies opened up an early lead, never trailed, and extended the lead to 21 points. The final score favored Connecticut 66–54. It was the 22nd meeting between teams ranked one and two in which Connecticut played; they moved to 19–3 in such games.

==== Temple (away) ====
The second game of the season against Temple, this time at their arena, turned out very differently than the first match-up. The Owls stole the ball 14 times, and even had a lead in the second quarter. The Huskies pulled out to a 10-point lead at halftime, and cut the lead to six midway through the third quarter before UConn extended the lead out to double digits and then eventually to 25 points. Williams hit all nine of her field-goal attempts. Jefferson had 25 points while Stewart had 24. The final score was 85–60.

==== Cincinnati (home) ====
Coach Auriemma had been concerned that the three seniors on the team were playing so well that the remainder of the team would tend to defer to them too much. While some of the bench players were getting substantial playing time, it was often when the lead was substantial. Auriemma decided to shake things up by using a starting lineup without any of the three seniors. Although the new lineup had an early 15–7 lead, the score was tied at 15 apiece late in the first quarter, when Auriemma brought in the seniors. The Bearcats scored 19 points in the first quarter, but would only score 15 more points in the remainder of the game. The Huskies won 88–34. Natalie Butler, in her first start as a Husky, recorded a double-double with 14 points and 10 rebounds.

==== East Carolina (away) ====
UConn traveled to North Carolina for their last game out of state prior to a possible Final Four game. They played East Carolina, who had been expected to do well in conference but had suffered devastating injuries and were only able to dress seven for the game. Samuelson hit several three-pointers early, scoring 15 points in the first quarter. With the Huskies up by 20 points at the end of the first quarter, the outcome was never in doubt. Stewart had eight blocks, only two away from notching a triple-double for the evening. She moved to second place on the all-time list for UConn behind only Rebecca Lobo with 396 career blocks. The Huskies beat the Pirates 84–41.

==== SMU (home) ====
The game against SMU was close for the first few minutes, but the Huskies then opened up a lead they would never relinquish. Tuck did not wear her knee brace and scored 10 points. Samuelson tied her season-high with 21 points. UConn went on to win their 64th consecutive game and their 58th consecutive AAC game, 88–41.

==== Tulane (home) ====
The game against Tulane was designated as Senior Day, a day when the seniors for the team were honored in pregame ceremonies. The four seniors, Breanna Stewart, Mariah Jefferson, Morgan Tuck, and Brianna Pulido, walked out onto the floor with family members and were given a framed memento including their jersey. The event was a sellout. In addition to honoring the seniors, the day is traditionally the day that members of the Huskies of Honor are announced. This year ceremonies included Stewart and Jefferson, both of whom had attained the first-team All-America status, as well as Chris Dailey, the associate head coach.

Traditionally, the seniors are designated starters on this day. Though three of the four seniors were regular starters, this game marked Briana Pulido's first start. Fresh from the emotions of the senior day festivities, the team started slower than normal. Tulane was up 13–2 at one point, the first time for the year the Huskies trailed by a double-digit margin. Soon thereafter, the team regained its bearings and ended up with an 80–40 win over the Green Wave. Samuelson hit six three-pointers and scored 21 points for the second straight time. Stewart struggled in the first half but ended up with a double-double — 20 points and 12 rebounds.

==== South Florida (home) ====
UConn found itself in unfamiliar territory, as they went into the halftime break trailing by a single point to South Florida. They had not trailed at the halftime on the season — the last time had been the 2015 NCAA tournament regional semifinal against Dayton. Whether it was good defense or poor offense, both teams were shooting 28% from the field in the first half. In the third quarter the Huskies scored 32 points, 16 of which came from Stewart, who single-handedly outscored the Bulls in the third quarter. South Florida's Courtney Williams scored 15 points in the first half, helping the Bulls take a one-point lead, but did not score in the third quarter. UConn won the final regular-season game 79–59.

=== AAC Tournament ===
==== East Carolina ====
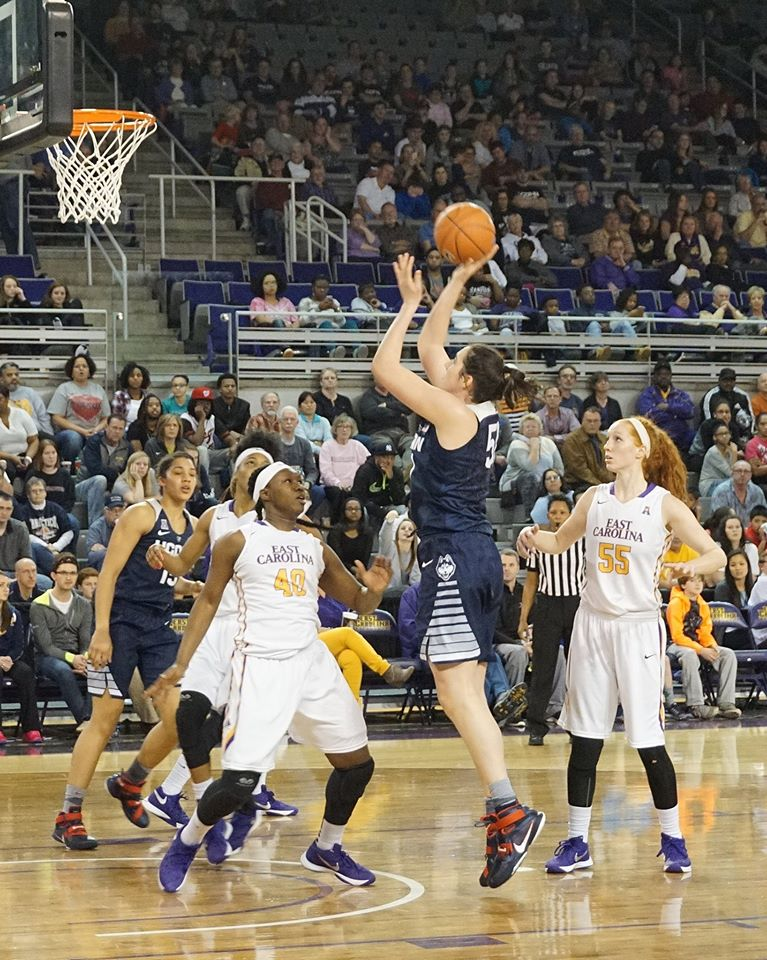
Natalie Butler shooting at East Carolina game

The Huskies started out faster in this game than in their prior two games, scoring 32 points in the first quarter and holding the Pirates to 13. Five different Huskies scored in double digits, with Tuck and Samuelson each scoring 16 points. UConn hit 59% of their shots from the field and went on to win 92–51 to extend their winning streak to 67 games.

==== Tulane ====
UConn faced Tulane in the semifinals of the AAC tournament. The last time the two teams squared off was on senior night in the penultimate game of the regular season. In that game the Huskies missed the first 12 shots and were down by double digits for the first time in the season. This time, the game would start off differently. The Huskies hit their first nine shots and were leading 28–5 at the end of the first quarter. The large lead allowed the coach to rest the starters and give the bench plenty of time on the court. UConn ended up hitting 55% of the shots and finished with the win, 82–35.

==== South Florida ====
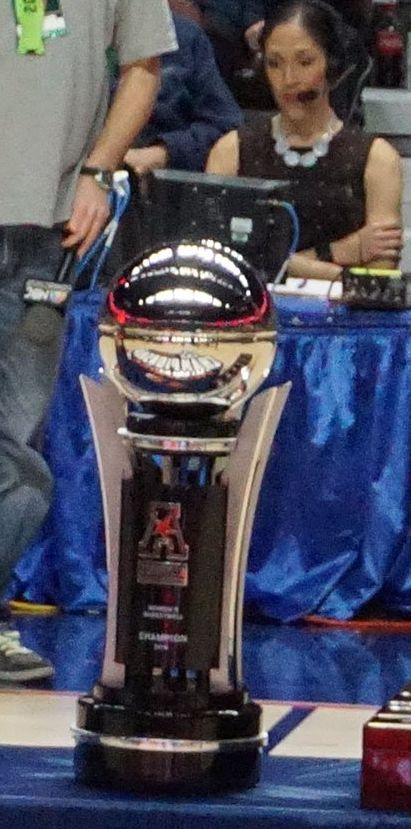
Championship trophy of the AAC basketball tournament

One week before, South Florida lead UConn at the half in the final game of the regular season. The two teams met again in the American Athletic Conference championship game. The Bulls also had a lead in this game, but this time they led at the end of the first quarter before falling behind and never retaking the lead. Jefferson was given the assignment of guarding Courtney Williams, the best player for South Florida, and held her to a single basket in the first half. In the second half the Huskies hit 15 of their first 19 field-goal attempts to extend the lead to 71–43. UConn won the game 77–51. Jefferson, Tuck and Samuelson were named to the all-tournament team while Stewart was named the tournament's most outstanding player.

=== NCAA Tournament ===
==== Robert Morris ====
It was an early start for the Huskies, both the game start at 11 AM and the scoring start with 41 points in the first quarter. The last time the Huskies lost in the first round of the NCAA tournament was 1993, before any of the current UConn players were born. They would not stop that streak this day, but would instead extend their current winning streak to 70 consecutive games, which was tied for the second longest winning streak in NCAA women's basketball history. They shared a tie with an earlier UConn streak which was second only to a 90-game UConn winning streak. Samuelson led the scorers with 22 points; Stewart had 18 points but also had three blocked shots which moved her into first place on the UConn career leaderboard for blocked shots. The final score was 101–49.

==== Duquesne ====
For a brief moment, the Duquesne Dukes were leading UConn. The score was 14–13, but the lead lasted only 17 seconds. UConn's Moriah Jefferson hit a three-pointer to start a 17–3 run, which was followed by a 22–4 run. Although the final score was lopsided 97–51, the Dukes made the Huskies work hard for the win. Stewart, Tuck, and Jefferson scored 21, 20 and 20 points respectively.

==== Mississippi State ====
A day after two number one seeds were upset in the Sweet 16, top-seeded Connecticut faced Mississippi State determined not to be upset themselves. The Huskies scored the first 13 points of the game, leaving little doubt regarding the outcome. At halftime, they were leading 61–12. The lead reached 68 points, and UConn was able to take out two of the starters with just under four minutes left in the third quarter. Despite setting a record for the most wins in program history with 28, the Mississippi State Bulldogs were never in the game, and ended up losing 98–38. The 60 point margin of victory established a new NCAA record in the regional rounds or beyond set by Connecticut in the previous year in a 51-point win over Texas.

==== Texas ====
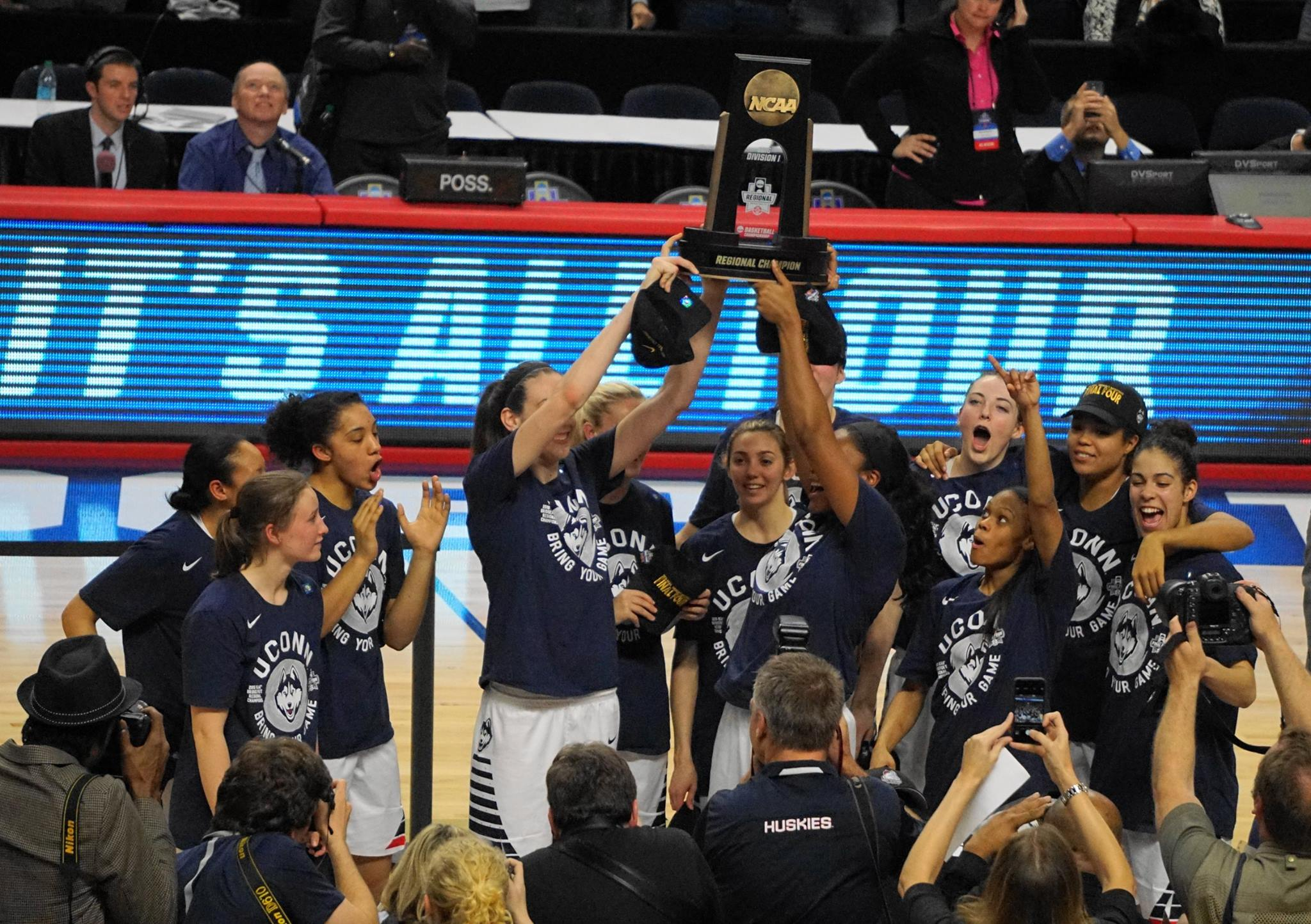
UConn after defeating Texas to advance to the 2016 Final Four

UConn faced Texas in the Elite Eight game. They had played Texas in a Sweet 16 game in the previous year, winning by 51 points, at the time the largest margin of victory in a Sweet 16 game. Although the teams were largely the same, the results were quite different. This year in the first quarter Texas hit three three-pointers, and was only trailing by two points. The Huskies extended the lead in the second quarter but Texas cut the lead back to five points. UConn pushed the lead to 15 points at halftime, and extended it to 21 points early in the third quarter, but Texas hit three more three-pointers and cut the lead to 12 points. UConn increased its defensive intensity and held the Longhorns to only five points over the next 5 ½ minutes. The Huskies finished the game with a 21-point margin 86–65 and headed to their ninth consecutive Final Four.

==== Oregon State ====
Breanna Stewart picked up her second foul with just over two minutes gone in the first quarter. Although it would not be known until halftime, Katie Lou Samuelson broke a bone in her foot in the first play the game and continue to play until halftime. Stewart continued in the game with the team switching to a zone defense, and switching her defensive responsibilities from 6’6” Ruth Hamblin to Devin Hunter. She managed to avoid picking up a third foul in the first half although it limited their ability to be aggressive. She only scored two points in the first half but transitioned from an emphasis on offense to being a ball distributor. Bench players Gabby Williams and Napheesa Collier contributed points and defense, especially in the opening half. UConn ended with an 80–51 win over Oregon State. The 29 point margin of victory is the largest margin in a national semifinal game in the second largest in Final Four history.

==== Syracuse ====
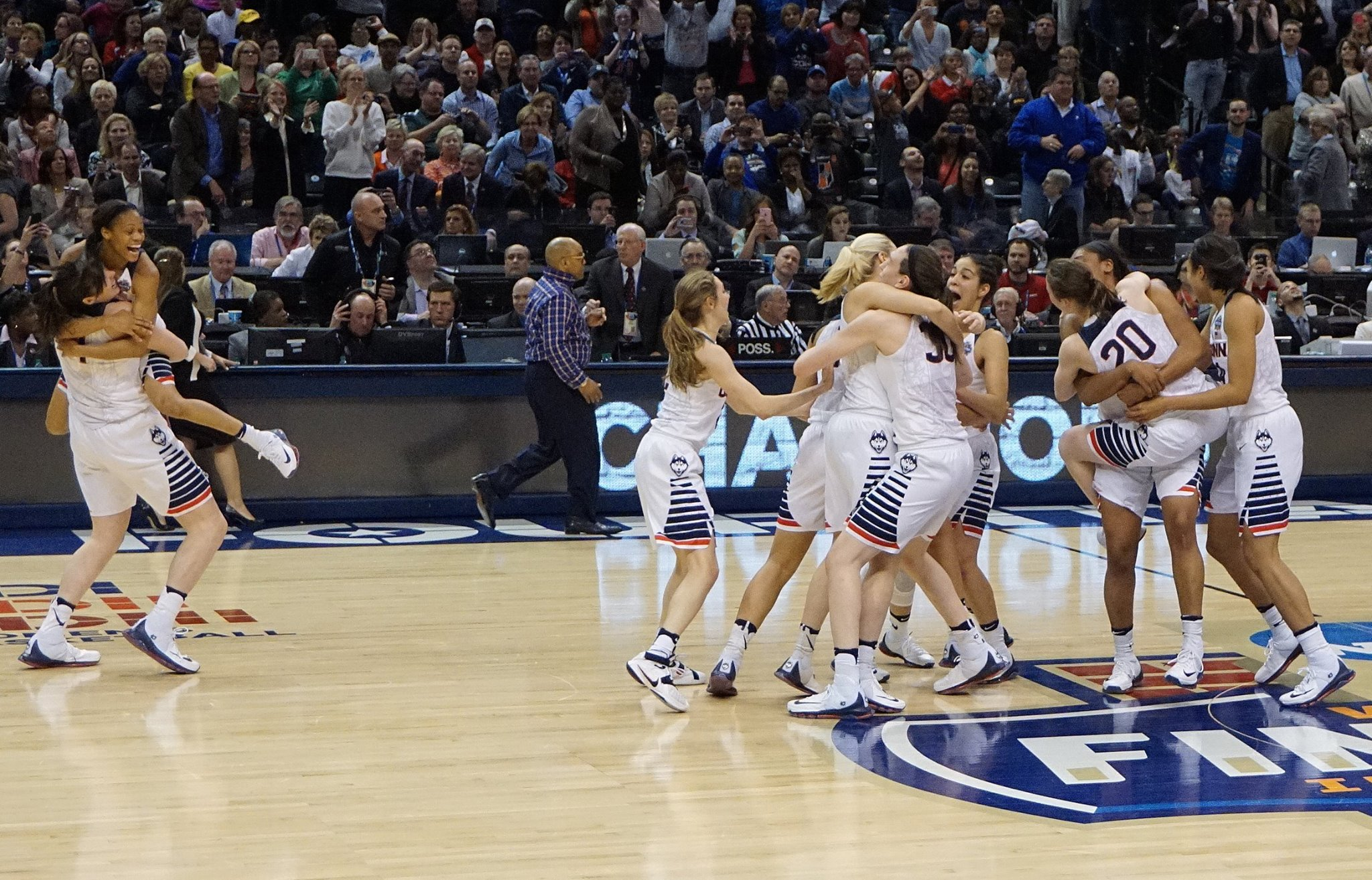
UConn Huskies moments after winning the 2016 National Championship

UConn's opponent in the Championship game was Syracuse, appearing in their first ever Final Four and championship game. UConn opened with the first nine points of the game. Syracuse attempted to respond with three-pointers; they had hit 12 three-pointers in their game against the Washington Huskies, but would only hit two in this game. UConn led in the third quarter 60–27 before Syracuse came back with a 16–0 run; that run still left the Huskies with a double-digit lead. In this game, Stewart did not get into foul trouble, and ended with 24 points, 10 rebounds, and six assists. Tuck had 19 points and Jefferson recorded 13 points. The final score was 82–51. This gave the UConn Huskies their 11th national championship, exceeding the 10 national championships recorded by John Wooden’s UCLA Bruins. The championship was also the fourth consecutive, marking the first time in history that a team won four consecutive championships. Stewart, Tuck, and Jefferson became the only NCAA players in history to have four national championships in their career.

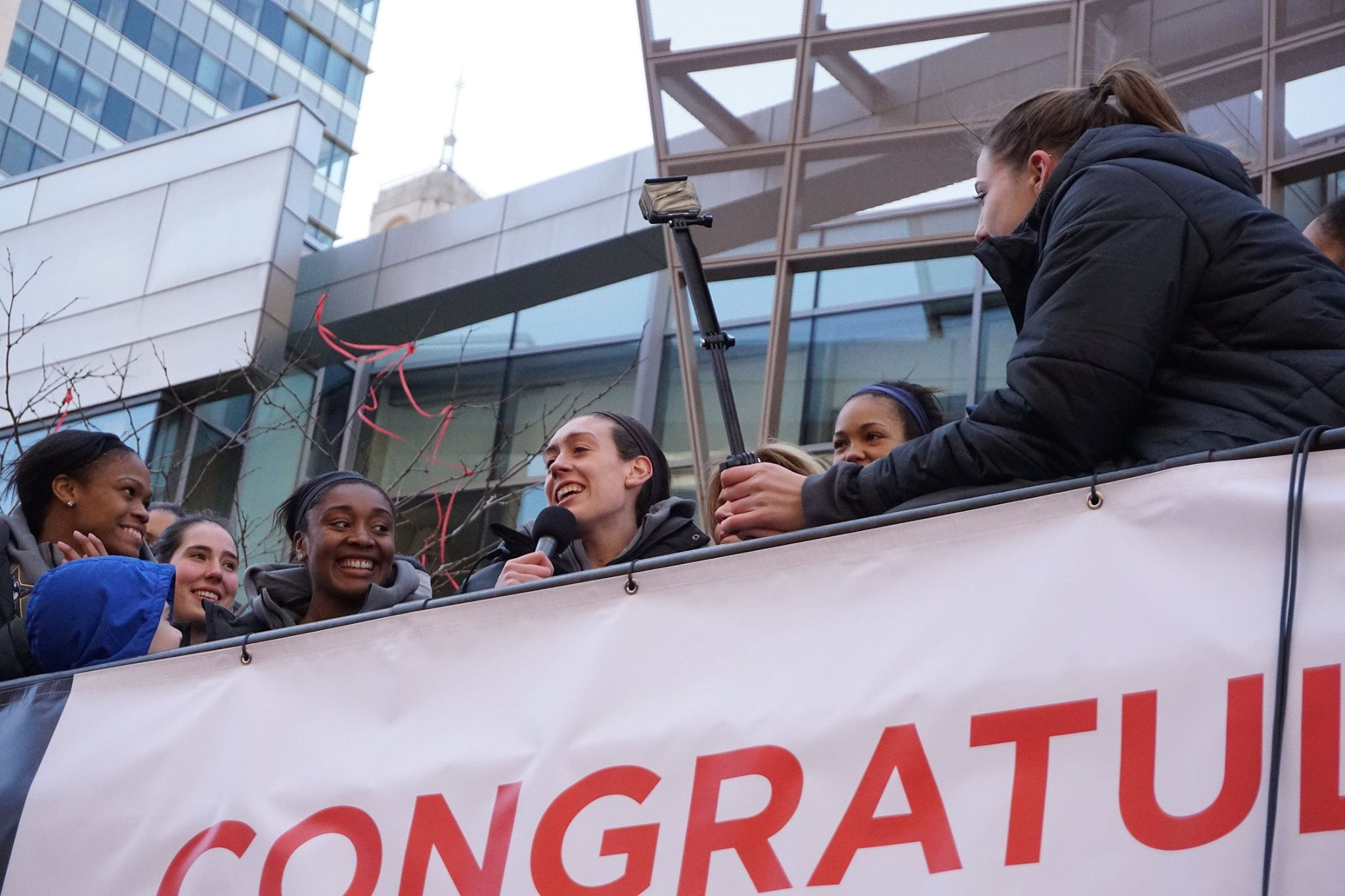
Victory parade for the 2016 NCAA Division I women's basketball National Champions

== Schedule ==
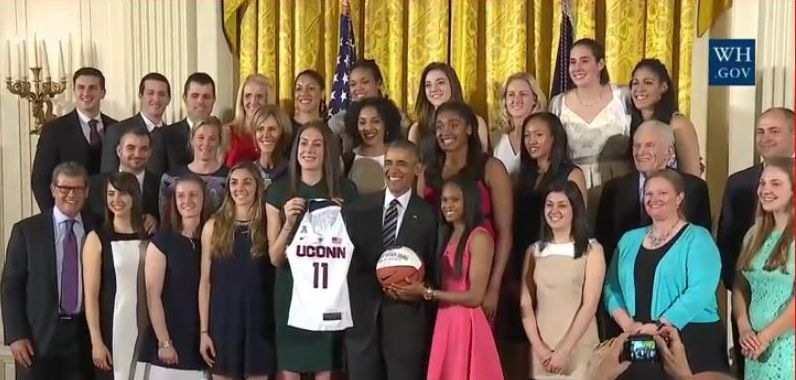
UConn Huskies at the White House to honor the 2016 Championship

The Huskies' exhibition game with Vanguard featured several experimental rules, many of which have been advocated by head coach Auriemma:

- The shot clock was 24 seconds, the same duration used in FIBA and WNBA play.
- The lane was 16 feet wide, identical to that used in the WNBA and virtually identical to the 4.9 meters used in FIBA play.
- The three-point arc was extended from its collegiate distance of a uniform 20 feet, 9 inches from the center of the basket to the FIBA and WNBA distance of 6.75 meters (22 feet, 1.75 inches), dropping to a minimum of 6.6 meters (21 feet, 8 inches) at the corners.
- The ball used was the "size 7" men's ball (29.5 inches circumference, weighing 22 ounces) instead of the standard "size 6" women's ball (28.5 inches, 20 ounces).

Date time, TV	Rank^{#}	Opponent^{#}	Result	Record	High points	High rebounds	High assists	Site (attendance) city, state
Exhibition
11/02/2015*; 7:00 pm, HuskyVision	No. 1	Lubbock Christian	W 95–39	–	25 – Stewart	12 – Williams	6 – Jefferson	XL Center (6,233); Hartford, CT
11/08/2015*; 2:00 pm, HuskyVision	No. 1	Vanguard	W 98–18	–	20 – Jefferson	11 – Collier	5 – Tuck	Gampel Pavilion (7,057); Storrs, CT
Non-conference regular season
11/16/2015*; 5:30 pm, ESPN2	No. 1	at No. 7 Ohio State; College Hoops Tip-Off Marathon	W 100–56	1–0	24 – Stewart	11 – Williams	4 – 3 tied	Value City Arena (11,435); Columbus, OH
11/23/2015*; 7:00 pm, SNY	No. 1	Kansas State	W 97–57	2–0	25 – Stewart	12 – Williams	7 – Jefferson	XL Center (8,369); Hartford, CT
11/28/2015*; 1:00 pm, SNY	No. 1	Nebraska	W 88–46	3–0	25 – Stewart	10 – Stewart	5 – Tied	XL Center (10,113); Hartford, CT
11/30/2015*; 6:30 pm, SNY	No. 1	at Chattanooga	W 79–31	4–0	15 – Jefferson	12 – Tied	4 – 3 tied	McKenzie Arena (6,104); Chattanooga, TN
12/02/2015*; 7:30 pm, FS1	No. 1	at No. 23 DePaul	W 86–70	5–0	29 – Stewart	12 – Stewart	9 – Jefferson	McGrath-Phillips Arena (4,001); Chicago, IL
12/05/2015*; 5:15 pm, ESPN	No. 1	No. 3 Notre Dame; Jimmy V Classic/Rivalry	W 91–81	6–0	28 – Stewart	12 – Stewart	8 – Tuck	Gampel Pavilion (10,167); Storrs, CT
12/09/2015*; 7:00 pm, SNY	No. 1	at Colgate	W 94–50	7–0	22 – Stewart	7 – Stewart	10 – Stewart	Cotterell Court (1,782); Hamilton, NY
12/11/2015*; 6:00 pm, ESPN2	No. 1	vs. No. 11 Florida State; Hall of Fame Women's Challenge	W 73–49	8–0	18 – Tuck	7 – Collier	7 – Stewart	Mohegan Sun Arena (8,157); Uncasville, CT
12/21/2015*; 7:00 pm, SNY	No. 1	LSU	W 86–40	9–0	18 – Jefferson	12 – Collier	8 – Nurse	XL Center (10,183); Hartford, CT
12/28/2015*; 8:30 pm, ESPN2	No. 1	vs. No. 6 Maryland; Maggie Dixon Classic	W 83–73	10–0	23 – Stewart	8 – Tuck	7 – Stewart	Madison Square Garden (6,575); New York City, NY
AAC regular season
12/30/2015; 7:00 pm, SNY	No. 1	at Cincinnati	W 107–45	11–0 (1–0)	16 – Stewart	12 – Collier	8 – Jefferson	Fifth Third Arena (2,246); Cincinnati, OH
01/06/2016; 7:00 pm, SNY	No. 1	Tulsa	W 95–35	12–0 (2–0)	18 – Tied	9 – Stewart	5 – Tied	XL Center (8,515); Hartford, CT
01/08/2016; 9:00 pm, ESPN2	No. 1	at Houston	W 76–37	13–0 (3–0)	13 – 4 tied	8 – Butler	3 – Samuelson	Hofheinz Pavilion (1,553); Houston, TX
01/10/2016; 5:00 pm, ESPN	No. 1	at No. 22 South Florida	W 75–59	14–0 (4–0)	22 – Tuck	12 – Tuck	6 – Jefferson	USF Sun Dome (6,634); Tampa, FL
01/13/2016; 6:00 pm, SNY	No. 1	at Memphis	W 86–46	15–0 (5–0)	21 – Jefferson	8 – Stewart	5 – Samuelson	Elma Roane Fieldhouse (2,342); Memphis, TN
01/16/2016; 6:00 pm, CBSSN	No. 1	Temple	W 104–49	16–0 (6–0)	22 – Stewart	10 – Stewart	6 – Samuelson	Gampel Pavilion (9,846); Storrs, CT
01/20/2016; 7:00 pm, SNY	No. 1	UCF	W 106–51	17–0 (7–0)	21 – Stewart	7 – Tied	7 – Samuelson	XL Center (8,523); Hartford, CT
01/23/2016; 3:00 pm, SNY	No. 1	at SMU	W 90–37	18–0 (8–0)	19 – Jefferson	12 – Stewart	7 – Stewart	Moody Coliseum (3,732); Dallas, TX
01/27/2016; 8:00 pm, SNY	No. 1	at Tulsa	W 94–30	19–0 (9–0)	24 – Stewart	10 – Stewart	5 – Stewart	Reynolds Center (2,091); Tulsa, OK
01/30/2016; 12:00 pm, SNY	No. 1	Memphis	W 83–40	20–0 (10–0)	19 – Stewart	7 – Stewart	7 – Jefferson	XL Center (12,047); Hartford, CT
02/03/2016; 8:00 pm, SNY	No. 1	at Tulane	W 96–38	21–0 (11–0)	20 – Stewart	6 – Collier	7 – Stewart	Devlin Fieldhouse (2,983); New Orleans, LA
02/06/2016; 1:00 pm, SNY	No. 1	East Carolina	W 92–46	22–0 (12–0)	20 – Nurse	10 – Stewart	8 – Jefferson	Gampel Pavilion (9,780); Storrs, CT
02/08/2016*; 7:00 pm, ESPN2	No. 1	at No. 2 South Carolina	W 66–54	23–0	25 – Stewart	10 – 2 tied	6 – Jefferson	Colonial Life Arena (18,000); Columbia, SC
02/14/2016; 12:00 pm, ESPN2	No. 1	at Temple	W 85–60	24–0 (13–0)	25 – Jefferson	11 – Williams	8 – Jefferson	McGonigle Hall (3,392); Philadelphia, PA
02/17/2016; 7:00 pm, SNY	No. 1	Cincinnati	W 88–34	25–0 (14–0)	14 – Tied	10 – Butler	5 – Stewart	Gampel Pavilion (8,461); Storrs, CT
02/20/2016; 8:00 pm, CBSSN	No. 1	at East Carolina	W 84–41	26–0 (15–0)	19 – Samuelson	11 – Stewart	5 – Jefferson	Williams Arena (3,781); Greenville, NC
02/24/2016; 7:00 pm, SNY	No. 1	SMU	W 88–41	27–0 (16–0)	21 – Samuelson	8 – Tuck	4 – Nurse	Gampel Pavilion (7,505); Storrs, CT
02/27/2016; 1:00 pm, SNY	No. 1	Tulane	W 80–40	28–0 (17–0)	21 – Samuelson	12 – Stewart	6 – Jefferson	Gampel Pavilion (10,167); Storrs, CT
02/29/2016; 7:00 pm, ESPN2	No. 1	No. 20 South Florida	W 79–59	29–0 (18–0)	27 – Stewart	13 – Stewart	5 – Tuck	Gampel Pavilion (9,030); Storrs, CT
American Athletic Conference women's tournament
03/05/2016; 2:00 pm, ESPN3	No. 1	vs. East Carolina; Quarterfinals	W 92–51	30–0	16 – Tied	9 – Williams	7 – Jefferson	Mohegan Sun Arena (7,033); Uncasville, CT
03/06/2016; 4:30 pm, ESPNU	No. 1	vs. Tulane; Semifinals	W 82–35	31–0	17 – Samuelson	9 – Butler	5 – Jefferson	Mohegan Sun Arena (6,821); Uncasville, CT
03/07/2016; 7:00 pm, ESPN2	No. 1	vs. No. 21 South Florida; Championship Game	W 77–51	32–0	22 – Stewart	7 – Tied	5 – Tuck	Mohegan Sun Arena (7,073); Uncasville, CT
NCAA women's tournament
03/19/2016*; 11:00 am, ESPN2	(1 B) No. 1	(16 B) Robert Morris; First Round	W 101–49	33–0	22 – Samuelson	9 – Collier	6 – Nurse	Gampel Pavilion (4,784); Storrs, CT
03/21/2016*; 9:00 pm, ESPN2	(1 B) No. 1	(9 B) Duquesne; Second Round	W 97–51	34–0	21 – Stewart	16 – Stewart	7 – Jefferson	Gampel Pavilion (6,316); Storrs, CT
03/26/2016*; 11:30 am, ESPN	(1 B) No. 1	vs. (5 B) No. 15 Mississippi State; Sweet Sixteen	W 98–38	35–0	22 – Stewart	14 – Stewart	5 – Nurse	Webster Bank Arena (8,898); Bridgeport, CT
03/28/2016*; 7:00 pm, ESPN	(1 B) No. 1	vs. (2 B) No. 7 Texas; Elite Eight	W 86–65	36–0	22 – Tuck	13 – Stewart	9 – Jefferson	Webster Bank Arena (9,008); Bridgeport, CT
04/03/2016*; 6:00 pm, ESPN	(1 B) No. 1	vs. (2 D) No. 6 Oregon State; Final Four	W 80–51	37–0	21 – Tuck	8 – Stewart	7 – Jefferson	Bankers Life Fieldhouse (15,227); Indianapolis, IN
04/05/2016*; 8:30 pm, ESPN	(1 B) No. 1	vs. (4 SF) No. 14 Syracuse; National Championship	W 82–51	38–0	24 – Stewart	10 – Stewart	6 – Stewart	Bankers Life Fieldhouse (14,514); Indianapolis, IN
*Non-conference game. ^{#}Rankings from AP Poll. (#) Tournament seedings in parentheses. B=Bridgeport Region. All times are in EST.

== Rankings ==
Regular season polls
Poll	Pre- Season	Week 2	Week 3	Week 4	Week 5	Week 6	Week 7	Week 8	Week 9	Week 10	Week 11	Week 12	Week 13	Week 14	Week 15	Week 16	Week 17	Week 18	Week 19	Final
AP	1	1	1	1	1	1	1	1	1	1	1	1	1	1	1	1	1	1	1	N/A
Coaches	1	1	1	1	1	1	1	1	1	1	1	1	1	1	1	1	1	1	1	1

Legend
	Increase in ranking
	Decrease in ranking
	Not ranked previous week
(RV)	Received votes

== WNBA draft ==
Breanna Stewart, Moriah Jefferson and Morgan Tuck were the first, second and third pick of the 2016 WNBA draft. Players from the same college team had never gone 1,2,3 in any draft in any major sport in history.

== Awards and honors ==
- Breanna Stewart
  - won the NCAA Bridgeport Regional Most Outstanding Player
  - earned the Most Outstanding Player of the Final Four at the 2016 NCAA Division I women's basketball tournament for a record fourth consecutive time
  - won the Associated Press Women's College Basketball Player of the Year for the third consecutive year
  - won her second Wade Trophy, presented to the Division I player of the year
  - was awarded the Naismith College Player of the Year for the third consecutive year
  - won the USBWA Women's National Player of the Year for the third consecutive year
  - won the 2016 American Athletic Conference Women's Basketball Player of the Year
  - won the John R. Wooden Award
  - was the recipient of the 2016 Senior CLASS Award
  - was the recipient of the James E. Sullivan Award
- Geno Auriemma
  - was awarded the Associated Press College Basketball Coach of the Year
  - won the AAC coach of the year
- Moriah Jefferson
  - won the Nancy Lieberman Award for the second consecutive year
  - won the WBCA Defensive Player of the Year award
  - won the Dawn Staley Award
  - won the AAC Defender of the Year
- Morgan Tuck
  - won the AAC Sportsmanship Award
  - was named to the all AAC first team
- Kia Nurse
  - was named to the all AAC third team
- Napheesa Collier
  - was named to the AAC all freshman team
- Katie Lou Samuelson
  - was named to the AAC all freshman team
