= 2015–16 South Carolina Gamecocks women's basketball team =

Intercollegiate basketball season

2015–16 South Carolina Gamecocks women's basketball

Rainbow Wahine Showdown Champions SEC Tournament Champions SEC Regular Season Champions

NCAA Women's Tournament, Sweet Sixteen
- Conference: Southeastern Conference

Ranking
- Coaches: No. 5
- AP: No. 3
- Record: 33–2 (16–0 SEC)
- Head coach: Dawn Staley (8th season)
- Assistant coaches: Lisa Boyer; Nikki McCray-Penson; Fred Chmiel
- Home arena: Colonial Life Arena

2015–16 SEC women's basketball standings
	Conf.				Overall
Team	W		L	PCT	W		L	PCT
No. 3 South Carolina †	16	–	0	1.000	33	–	2	.943
No. 15 Mississippi State	11	–	5	.688	28	–	8	.778
No. 18 Texas A&M	11	–	5	.688	22	–	10	.688
No. 12 Kentucky	10	–	6	.625	25	–	8	.758
No. 25 Florida	10	–	6	.625	22	–	9	.710
Georgia	9	–	7	.563	21	–	10	.677
Missouri	8	–	8	.500	22	–	10	.688
Tennessee	8	–	8	.500	22	–	14	.611
Auburn	8	–	8	.500	20	–	13	.606
Arkansas	7	–	9	.438	12	–	18	.400
Vanderbilt	5	–	11	.313	18	–	14	.563
Alabama	4	–	12	.250	15	–	16	.484
LSU	3	–	13	.188	10	–	21	.323
Ole Miss	2	–	14	.125	10	–	20	.333
† 2016 SEC tournament winner As of March 27, 2016; Rankings from AP poll

The 2015–16 South Carolina Gamecocks women's basketball team represented the University of South Carolina during the 2015–16 NCAA Division I women's basketball season. The Gamecocks, led by eighth year head coach Dawn Staley, played their home games at the Colonial Life Arena and were members of the Southeastern Conference. They finished the season 33–2, 16–0 in SEC play to win their third consecutive SEC regular season and the second consecutive tournament championship to earn an automatic bid to the NCAA women's tournament. They defeated Jacksonville and Kansas State in the first and second rounds before getting upset by Syracuse in the sweet sixteen.

== Roster ==
2015–16 South Carolina Gamecocks women's basketball team
Players
Coaches

Pos.	#	Name	Height	Year	Previous school	Hometown
G	0	Shay Colley	5 ft 8 in (1.73 m)	Fr	St. Edmund Campion Secondary	Brampton, ON
G	1	Bianca Cuevas	5 ft 6 in (1.68 m)	So	Nazareth Regional	Bronx, NY
G	3	Kaydra Duckett	5 ft 8 in (1.73 m)	So	Dreher	Columbia, SC
G	4	Doniyah Cliney	6 ft 0 in (1.83 m)	RS Fr	Malcolm X Shabazz	Newark, NJ
G	5	Khadijah Sessions	5 ft 8 in (1.73 m)	Sr	North Myrtle Beach	North Myrtle Beach, SC
G	10	Allisha Gray (I) (redshirt)	6 ft 0 in (1.83 m)	Jr	Washington County; North Carolina	Sandersville, GA
G	15	Tiffany Davis	5 ft 7 in (1.7 m)	RS So	Westbury Christian	Houston, TX
F	22	A'ja Wilson	6 ft 5 in (1.96 m)	So	Heathwood Hall	Hopkins, SC
G	23	Tina Roy	5 ft 11 in (1.8 m)	RS Sr	Kaplan	Kaplan, LA
C	24	Sarah Imovbioh	6 ft 2 in (1.88 m)	RS Sr	St. Anne's-Belfield; Virginia	Abuja, Nigeria
G	25	Tiffany Mitchell	5 ft 9 in (1.75 m)	Sr	Providence Day	Charlotte, NC
G/F	31	Asia Dozier	6 ft 0 in (1.83 m)	Sr	Spring Valley	Columbia, SC
G	35	Kaela Davis (I) (redshirt)	6 ft 2 in (1.88 m)	Jr	Buford; Georgia Tech	Suwanee, GA
F	40	Jatarie White	6 ft 4 in (1.93 m)	So	Providence Day	Charlotte, NC
C	41	Alaina Coates	6 ft 4 in (1.93 m)	Jr	Dutch Fork	Irmo, SC
G	44	India Farmer	6 ft 0 in (1.83 m)	Jr	North Myrtle Beach	North Myrtle Beach, SC

Head coach

Dawn Staley (Virginia)

Assistant coach(es)

Lisa Boyer (Ithaca)
Nikki McCray-Penson (Tennessee)
Fred Chmiel (Alaska–Anchorage)

Legend

- (C) Team captain
- (S) Suspended
- (I) Ineligible
- (W) Walk-on
- Injured
- Current redshirt

Roster

== Schedule ==
Date time, TV	Rank^{#}	Opponent^{#}	Result	Record	Site (attendance) city, state
Exhibition
11/06/2015*; 7:00 pm	No. 2	Newberry	W 93–49		Colonial Life Arena; Columbia, SC
Regular season
11/13/2015*; 7:00 pm	No. 2	No. 6 Ohio State	W 88–80	1–0	Colonial Life Arena (16,815); Columbia, SC
11/15/2015*; 3:00 pm	No. 2	UNC Greensboro	W 91–44	2–0	Colonial Life Arena (13,607); Columbia, SC
11/18/2015*; 7:00 pm	No. 2	at Clemson; Rivalry	W 67–41	3–0	Jervey Athletic Center (1,030); Clemson, SC
11/22/2015*; 4:00 pm, P12N	No. 2	at UCLA	W 68–65	4–0	Pauley Pavilion (2,018); Los Angeles, CA
11/27/2015*; 7:30 pm	No. 2	vs. No. 16 Arizona State; Rainbow Wahine Showdown	W 60–58	5–0	Stan Sheriff Center; Honolulu, HI
11/28/2015*; 6:30 pm	No. 2	vs. Cal State Bakersfield; Rainbow Wahine Showdown	W 90–71	6–0	Stan Sheriff Center; Honolulu, HI
11/29/2015*; 10:00 pm	No. 2	at Hawaiʻi; Rainbow Wahine Showdown	W 67–51	7–0	Stan Sheriff Center (2,073); Honolulu, HI
12/06/2015*; 2:00 pm, ESPN2	No. 2	No. 14 Duke	W 66–55	8–0	Colonial Life Arena (16,429); Columbia, SC
12/13/2015*; 2:00 pm, SECN	No. 2	Winthrop	W 86–37	9–0	Colonial Life Arena (13,409); Columbia, SC
12/16/2015*; 7:00 pm	No. 2	Hampton	W 86–48	10–0	Colonial Life Arena (12,117); Columbia, SC
12/20/2015*; 1:00 pm, ASN	No. 2	vs. East Carolina; Carolinas Challenge	W 89–57	11–0	Myrtle Beach Convention Center; Myrtle Beach, SC
12/22/2015*; 7:00 pm	No. 2	Elon	W 78–63	12–0	Colonial Life Arena (13,670); Columbia, SC
01/03/2016; 3:00 pm, ESPNU	No. 2	Arkansas	W 85–32	13–0 (1–0)	Colonial Life Arena (13,407); Columbia, SC
01/07/2016; 9:00 pm, SECN	No. 2	at Vanderbilt	W 71–61	14–0 (2–0)	Memorial Gymnasium (2,547); Nashville, TN
01/10/2016; 12:00 pm, SECN	No. 2	No. 20 Missouri	W 83–58	15–0 (3–0)	Colonial Life Arena (15,934); Columbia, SC
01/14/2016; 7:00 pm, SECN	No. 2	at No. 9 Kentucky	W 73–62	16–0 (4–0)	Memorial Coliseum (5,527); Lexington, KY
01/17/2016; 1:00 pm, ESPN2	No. 2	No. 15 Texas A&M	W 59–58	17–0 (5–0)	Colonial Life Arena (15,406); Columbia, SC
01/21/2016; 7:00 pm	No. 2	at Auburn	W 74–58	18–0 (6–0)	Auburn Arena (2,419); Auburn, AL
01/24/2016; 5:00 pm, ESPN2	No. 2	at No. 10 Mississippi State	W 57–51	19–0 (7–0)	Humphrey Coliseum (10,626); Starkville, MS
01/28/2016; 7:00 pm	No. 2	Ole Miss	W 81–62	20–0 (8–0)	Colonial Life Arena (14,313); Columbia, SC
01/31/2016; 6:00 pm, ESPNU	No. 2	at No. 10 Texas A&M	W 70–63	21–0 (9–0)	Reed Arena (8,511); College Station, TX
02/04/2016; 7:00 pm, SECN	No. 2	No. 18 Kentucky	W 78–68	22–0 (10–0)	Colonial Life Arena (15,015); Columbia, SC
02/08/2016*; 7:00 pm, ESPN2	No. 2	No. 1 Connecticut	L 54–66	22–1	Colonial Life Arena (18,000); Columbia, SC
02/11/2016; 7:00 pm	No. 2	No. 16 Florida	W 86–71	23–1 (11–0)	Colonial Life Arena (13,324); Columbia, SC
02/15/2016; 7:00 pm, ESPN2	No. 3	at No. 24 Tennessee	W 62–56	24–1 (12–0)	Thompson–Boling Arena (12,014); Knoxville, TN
02/18/2016; 7:00 pm	No. 3	Georgia	W 61–51	25–1 (13–0)	Colonial Life Arena (16,186); Columbia, SC
02/22/2016; 7:00 pm, SECN	No. 3	at Alabama	W 66–46	26–1 (14–0)	Foster Auditorium (2,649); Tuscaloosa, AL
02/25/2016; 9:00 pm, SECN	No. 3	at Ole Miss	W 66–45	27–1 (15–0)	The Pavilion at Ole Miss (1,473); Oxford, MS
02/28/2016; 2:00 pm, ESPNU	No. 3	LSU	W 75–39	28–1 (16–0)	Colonial Life Arena (16,240); Columbia, SC
SEC Women's Tournament
03/04/2016; 12:00 pm, SECN	(1) No. 3	vs. (9) Auburn; Quarterfinals	W 57–48	29–1	Jacksonville Veterans Memorial Arena; Jacksonville, FL
03/05/2016; 3:00 pm, ESPNU	(1) No. 3	vs. (5) No. 13 Kentucky; Semifinals	W 93–63	30–1	Jacksonville Veterans Memorial Arena; Jacksonville, FL
03/06/2016; 2:30 pm, ESPN	(1) No. 3	vs. (3) No. 16 Mississippi State; Championship Game	W 66–52	31–1	Jacksonville Veterans Memorial Arena (6,549); Jacksonville, FL
NCAA Women's Tournament
03/18/2016*; 7:30 pm, ESPN2	(1 SF) No. 3	(16 SF) Jacksonville; First Round	W 77–41	32–1	Colonial Life Arena (10,276); Columbia, SC
03/20/2016*; 7:00 pm, ESPN	(1 SF) No. 3	(9 SF) Kansas State; Second Round	W 73–47	33–1	Colonial Life Arena (10,048); Columbia, SC
03/25/2016*; 7:00 pm, ESPN	(1 SF) No. 3	vs. (4 SF) No. 14 Syracuse; Sweet Sixteen	L 72–80	33–2	Denny Sanford Premier Center (4,610); Sioux Falls, SD
*Non-conference game. ^{#}Rankings from AP Poll. (#) Tournament seedings in parentheses. SF=Sioux Falls Region. All times are in Eastern Time.

== Rankings ==
Ranking movement Legend: ██ Increase in ranking. ██ Decrease in ranking. NR = Not ranked. RV = Received votes.
Poll	Pre	Wk 2	Wk 3	Wk 4	Wk 5	Wk 6	Wk 7	Wk 8	Wk 9	Wk 10	Wk 11	Wk 12	Wk 13	Wk 14	Wk 15	Wk 16	Wk 17	Wk 18	Wk 19	Final
AP	2	2	2	2	2	2	2	2	2	2	2	2	2	2	3	3	3	3	3	N/A
Coaches	2	2	2	2	2	2	2	2	2	2	2	2	2	2	2	2	2	2	2	5

== See also ==
2015–16 South Carolina Gamecocks men's basketball team
