= Omar Khanani =

British-American basketball player

Personal information
- Born: June 1, 1984 (age 42) Durham, North Carolina, U.S.
- Listed height: 5 ft 11 in (1.80 m)
- Listed weight: 169 lb (77 kg)

Career information
- High school: Laurinburg Institute (Laurinburg, North Carolina)
- College: Texas College; New Orleans
- Position: Point guard

Omar Khanani (born June 1, 1984) is a retired British-American professional basketball player and now works as a pro player development trainer with NBA players. As a basketball player, he primarily played as a point guard. He has played in the United States and in various parts of the world, including Europe and the Middle East.

== Early life and education ==
Holding dual British and American citizenship, Omar Khanani was born on June 1, 1984 in Durham, North Carolina. He attended Laurinburg Institute, a preparatory school in Laurinburg, North Carolina known for its strong basketball program. While Khanani played for Laurinburg, the Laurinburg basketball team won the U.S. Prep National Championship in 2003 as the team included 16 division 1 players. He graduated from Laurinburg Institute in 2004. He later went on to play college basketball at Texas College, completing his collegiate career in 2009. He also played for University of New Orleans for one season. He was eligible for the NBA Draft in 2009 but was not drafted.

== Career ==
Khanani played for several clubs in various international leagues all over Europe and Middle East. He played for the Manchester Giants in the British Basketball League (BBL) in 2015.

Beyond his playing career, Omar Khanani has also been noted for his work as a basketball trainer. He trained TJ Warren throughout his college and NBA career and also the twin basketball players Caleb Martin and Cody Martin since they were freshman at North Carolina State University. to Nevada and throughout their NBA careers. Omar has also worked with many other current pros in the NBA and overseas.

Standing at 180 cm (5 ft 11 in) and weighing 77 kg (169 lbs), Khanani typically played as a point guard.

He was an assistant coach in the inaugural BAL season for the Rwanda Patriots in 2021. During that time, Khanani served as J. Cole's personal trainer throughout his professional basketball career.

Khanani was a Brooklyn Nets player development coach during the 2022–23 season .
