= Pakistan Forex scam case =

2008–2011 Pakistani legal case

In November 2008, Munaf Kalia (CEO of Khanani and Kalia International (Pvt.) Ltd.), Yusuf Kalia, and associates, were charged with illegally transferring funds from Pakistan to Afghanistan. In light of the charges, the State Bank of Pakistan revoked the license for Khanani and Kalia International to operate its foreign exchange business and shut down its offices.

On March 5, 2011, the directors of Khanani and Kailia International and four bankers were acquitted of all charges due to lack of evidence. The judge cited the prosecution's failure to present evidence that directly implicated the defendants.

== Background ==
Since the depreciation of the rupee from July 2007, the Federal Investigation Agency was investigating the unexpected depreciation by the orders of the Pakistani government. In November 2008, the government sought support from Interpol with whose help the FIA cracked down all over Pakistan searching for persons involved in illegal smuggling of US dollars outside Pakistan. The FIA conducted raids in various parts of Karachi detained more than 12 people including Munaf Kalia, and ten officials of the National Database Registration Authority suspected of providing counterfeit identity cards. Manaf Kalia appeared in the court of Omar Awan, judicial magistrate South Karachi on November 9, 2008. The FIA sought and obtained a remand to Lahore to face another charge.

== Exit Control List ==
The Special Civil Court of Lahore, ordered that more than 14 names of different people involved in the forex scam case be included in the Exit Control List (ECL) of Pakistan.

== Timeline ==
On November 10, 2008, the State Bank of Pakistan suspended the licence of Khanani and Kalia for 30 days and debarred KKI's head office, branches, franchises payment booths and currency exchange booths from undertaking any kind of business for violating its rules and regulations.

On December 10, 2008, the State Bank of Pakistan suspended the licence of Khanani and Kalia for an indefinite period of time. The suspension order further stated that the company's headquarter, branch offices and/or franchise cannot carry any business dealings.

In August 2009, a second foreign exchange company in Pakistan Zarco Exchange was accused of similar allegations and also had its license revoked and forced to shut down.

In December 2010, the Special Court (offences in banking) Lahore said that due to lack of evidence it saw no reason that Zarco Exchange should not request a revival of its license from the State Bank of Pakistan, and in February 2011, its CEO was released by the Pakistan Federal Investigation Agency (FIA) after it said it decided to no longer pursue the case. In April 2011, Zarco Exchange's license was restored and the business started operating again.

On March 5, 2011, the directors of Khanani and Kailia International and four bankers were acquitted of all charges due to lack of evidence. However, the FIA complained about the acquittal and said it had provided enough evidence. In response, the Supreme Court of Pakistan had an independent judge investigate the acquittal. Following the acquittal, a separate action by the FIA appeared to have failed due to mistakes that meant evidence provided to the court was missing important information.

== Hawala business ==
The government's action against Hawala trade, which involves international network of currency dealers for making unrecorded payments in each other's countries, was one step in the series of the forex scam case. These steps were taken at a time when the rupee depreciated by 30 percent against the dollar since the beginning of 2008.
