= Laurinburg Institute =

Location
- 125 McGirts Bridge Road; Laurinburg, North Carolina 28352; United States; 34°46′59″N 79°27′24″W

Information
- Motto: "Deeds, Not Words"
- Established: 1904 (122 years ago)
- CEEB code: 342176
- President: Frank H. McDuffie, Jr.
- Grades: 9–12
- Colors: Blue and gold
- Team name: Tigers
- Website: www.laurinburginstitute.org

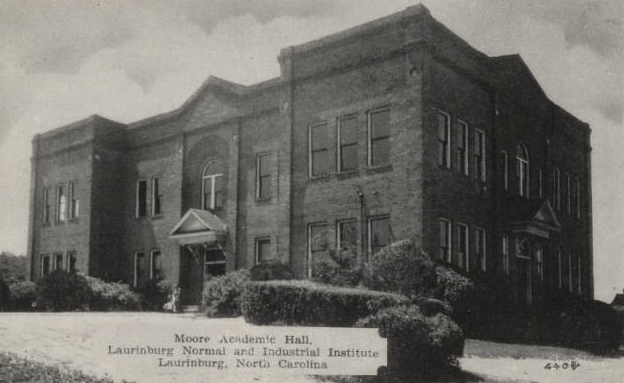
Postcard image of Moore Academic Hall at the Laurinburg Institute

Laurinburg Institute is a historic African American preparatory school in Laurinburg, North Carolina. The school was founded in 1904, by Emmanuel Monty and Tinny McDuffie at the request of Booker T. Washington. The school has had a successful men's basketball program in the past, with alumni of the school having competed at the collegiate, international, and professional levels, including in the National Basketball Association (NBA).

== Notable alumni ==
- Antonio Anderson, NBA player
- Renaldo Balkman, NBA player
- Spider Bennett, ABA player
- Joe Budden, broadcaster, songwriter, and former rapper
- Draelon Burns, basketball player
- Wes Covington, MLB player
- Charlie Davis, NBA player
- Joey Dorsey, NBA player
- Robert Dozier, PBA player
- Arvydas Eitutavičius, Lithuanian professional basketball player
- Mike Evans, NBA player and coach
- Dizzy Gillespie, musician
- Chris Johnson, NBA player
- Sam Jones, member of the Basketball Hall of Fame, 10x NBA champion and 5x NBA All-Star
- Omar Khanani, basketball player
- Earl "The Goat" Manigault, street basketball player
- Grachan Moncur III, jazz trombonist
- Billy Reid, NBA Player
- Quantez Robertson, BBL player
- Magnum Rolle, Bahamian professional basketball player
- Charlie Scott, member of the Basketball Hall of Fame, 3x NBA All-Star and NBA champion in 1976
- Jimmy Walker, NBA player
- Chris Washburn, NBA player
- Dexter Westbrook, ABA player
- Shawne Williams, NBA player
