= Khanani & Kalia International =

Pakistani foreign exchange company, 1983–2008

Khanani & Kalia International (Private) Limited
- Type: Private
- Industry: Money exchange
- Founded: 30 April 1992 in Karachi, Sindh, Pakistan
- Founder: Altaf Khanani; Javed Khanani; Hanif S. Kalia; Abdul Kalia
- Defunct: 2008
- Headquarters: Suite #1101-1105, 11th Floor, Block-A, Saima Trade Tower, I. I. Chundrigar Road, Saddar, Karachi, Pakistan
- Products: Financial services
- Revenue: ▲US$25–31 billion
- Website: kkionline.com

Khanani & Kalia International (Private) Limited (abbreviated KKI) was a Pakistani foreign exchange company that operated from 1992 to 2008, when it was closed down by the government of Pakistan for being involved in money laundering. Blocked by U.S. Department of the Treasury’s Office of Foreign Assets Control (OFAC), it was found to have also involved in the illicit international movement of money between, among others, Pakistan, the United Arab Emirates, United States, United Kingdom, Canada, and Australia. KKI was founded by the Khanani brothers, Altaf Khanani and Javed Khanani, along with the Kalia brothers, Hanif S. Kalia and Abdul Kalia.

Its corporate head office was in Karachi, Sindh, Pakistan. It had its international marketing and commercial services office in Mississauga, Ontario, Canada. It had a network of branches all over Pakistan, as well as a number of branches overseas.

Over the course of its operations more than US$40 billion had passed through the company.

== Financial operations ==
KKI was founded on 30 April 1992 as a joint venture between the Khanani brothers (Altaf Khanani and Javed Khanani) and the Kalia brothers (Hanif S. Kalia and Abdul Kalia). The Kalia brothers ran the Kalia Group of companies founded by Hanif and run by his younger brother Abdul. The Kalia Group was founded in July 1983 as Kalia and Sons to trade and deal in prize bonds. Later it expanded and became the Kalia Group.

KKI offered a number of services including currency exchange, home remittance, outward remittance, and business administration. The company had branches in Karachi, Lahore and Islamabad, and a franchises networked all over Pakistan. The company also had foreign branches in London, Glasgow, Sydney, New York, Toronto, Montreal, Scarborough, Ontario, Vancouver, Kuwait City, Bahrain, and Qatar.

KKI was part of the Kalia Group which also provided services including management consultancy, internal auditing, IT management, HR management, business administration, marketing, and R&D on behalf of clients. It funded Dawood Ibrahim’s D-Company and had links with Dawood. It also funded militant organisations such as Lashkar-e-Taiba, Jaish-e-Mohammed and Kashmiri Militants along with terrorist attacks such as 2008 Mumbai attacks, while having links with Inter-Services Intelligence.

KKI was reported to have made counterfeit Indian currency, which was done under Javed Khanani. He died in December 2016 after falling from a building, though it was unclear whether it was a suicide or murder. His death came weeks after demonetisation took place in India.

== Money laundering ==
Khanani's money laundering organisation was involved in the illicit international movement of money between, among others, Pakistan, the United Arab Emirates, United States, United Kingdom, Canada, and Australia. Among the methods used was the traditional hawala system. The organization moved money for drug cartels, biker gangs, Hezbollah, al-Qaeda.

Khanani was arrested in September 2016 in Panama by the US Drug Enforcement Administration, and transported to jail in the United States. He was indicted in the US District Court of the Southern District of Florida on fourteen counts of money laundering in June 2015. In a plea bargain, Khanani pleaded guilty to a single count of conspiracy to commit laundering. His sentence included 68 months in prison, a $250,000 fine, blacklisting by the United States along with his son Obaid Khanani and nephew Hozaifa Khanani, and his money laundering network has been designated as a transnational criminal organization under the SDN by the United States Department of the Treasury's Office of Foreign Assets Control. Its addresses included Australia, Canada, Pakistan, United Arab Emirates, United Kingdom and United States. Khanani was released from prison on July 13, 2020.

Danyaal Khan is also accused of orchestrating KKI's money operation. Another member of this organisation accused of conspiring in the money laundering is Mohammed Ellahi.

=== Pakistan Forex Scam case ===
On 7 November 2008, KKI became part of the Pakistan Forex scam case when the Federal Investigation Agency started investigations into the company and arrested company executives Javed Khanani and Munaf Kalia after being tipped off on an illegal hawala transaction and having earlier seized US$786,000 and four hawala vouchers from a franchise Dunya International Moneychangers in Gujranwala. In response, the and State Bank of Pakistan revoked KKI's license to operate its forex business forcing the company to shut down all its branches. Money exchangers, including KKI, had transferred around US$10 billion from 2003 to 2008 through illegal channels, transferring about US$10 million everyday .

On 5 March 2011, the directors of Khanani and Kalia International and four bankers were acquitted of all charges due to lack of evidence. However the FIA complained about the acquittal and said it had provided enough evidence. In response, the Supreme Court of Pakistan had an independent judge investigate the acquittal.

== See also ==
- Bank of Credit and Commerce International, Pakistani bank closed for money laundering
