= 2015–16 Alabama Crimson Tide women's basketball team =

Intercollegiate basketball season

2015–16 Alabama Crimson Tide women's basketball

Nugget Classic Champions

WNIT First Round
- Conference: Southeastern Conference
- Record: 15–16 (4–12 SEC)
- Head coach: Kristy Curry (3rd season)
- Assistant coaches: Kelly Curry; Shereka Wright
- Home arena: Foster Auditorium; Coleman Coliseum

2015–16 SEC women's basketball standings
	Conf.				Overall
Team	W		L	PCT	W		L	PCT
No. 3 South Carolina †	16	–	0	1.000	33	–	2	.943
No. 15 Mississippi State	11	–	5	.688	28	–	8	.778
No. 18 Texas A&M	11	–	5	.688	22	–	10	.688
No. 12 Kentucky	10	–	6	.625	25	–	8	.758
No. 25 Florida	10	–	6	.625	22	–	9	.710
Georgia	9	–	7	.563	21	–	10	.677
Missouri	8	–	8	.500	22	–	10	.688
Tennessee	8	–	8	.500	22	–	14	.611
Auburn	8	–	8	.500	20	–	13	.606
Arkansas	7	–	9	.438	12	–	18	.400
Vanderbilt	5	–	11	.313	18	–	14	.563
Alabama	4	–	12	.250	15	–	16	.484
LSU	3	–	13	.188	10	–	21	.323
Ole Miss	2	–	14	.125	10	–	20	.333
† 2016 SEC tournament winner As of March 27, 2016; Rankings from AP poll

The 2015–16 Alabama Crimson Tide women's basketball team represented the University of Alabama in the 2015–16 college basketball season. The Crimson Tide, led by third year head coach Kristy Curry, played their games at Foster Auditorium with two games at Coleman Coliseum and were members of the Southeastern Conference. They finished the season 15–16, 4–12 in SEC play to finish in twelfth place. They lost in the first round of the SEC women's tournament to LSU. They were invited to the Women's National Invitation Tournament, where they lost in the first round to Tulane.

== Roster ==
2015–16 Alabama Crimson Tide women's basketball team
Players
Coaches

Pos.	#	Name	Height	Year	Previous school	Hometown
F	1	Quanetria Bolton	6 ft 0 in (1.83 m)	So	Anniston HS	Anniston, AL
G	2	Trista Magee	6 ft 0 in (1.83 m)	Fr	Presbyterian Christian	Ellisville, MS
F	3	Khadijah Carter	6 ft 1 in (1.85 m)	Sr	Goodrich; Jacksonville College	Goodrich, TX
G	5	Breanna Hayden	5 ft 8 in (1.73 m)	Jr	Madison HS; Baylor	Dallas, TX
G	11	Hannah Cook	6 ft 0 in (1.83 m)	So	Ozark HS	Ozark, MO
G	12	C'Coriea Foy	5 ft 11 in (1.8 m)	Fr	Jack Britt HS	Fayetteville, NC
F	13	Nikki Hegstetter	6 ft 2 in (1.88 m)	Sr	Harrison HS	Kennesaw, GA
G	15	Meoshonti Knight	5 ft 8 in (1.73 m)	So	Central Catholic HS	Morgan City, LA
F	20	Ashley Williams	6 ft 0 in (1.83 m)	Jr	Alcovy HS	Covington, GA
G	21	Taylor Berry	5 ft 9 in (1.75 m)	Fr	Mount Carmel Academy	New Orleans, LA
G	22	Karyla Middlebrook	5 ft 7 in (1.7 m)	RS So	Blue Springs HS	Blue Springs, MO
G	23	Shquera Wade	6 ft 0 in (1.83 m)	Fr	Huntsville HS	Huntsville, AL
F	35	Diamante Martinez	6 ft 3 in (1.91 m)	So	Edna Karr HS	New Orleans, LA

Head coach

- Kristy Curry (Louisiana–Monroe)

Assistant coach(es)

- Kelly Curry (Texas A&M)
- Shereka Wright (Purdue)

Legend

- (C) Team captain
- (S) Suspended
- (I) Ineligible
- (W) Walk-on
- Injured
- Current redshirt

Roster

== Schedule ==
Date time, TV	Rank^{#}	Opponent^{#}	Result	Record	Site (attendance) city, state
Exhibition
11/09/2015*; 6:00 pm		Faulkner	W 93–34		Foster Auditorium; Tuscaloosa, AL
Non-conference regular season
11/13/2015*; 4:30 pm		Alabama A&M	W 96–44	1–0	Coleman Coliseum (2,120); Tuscaloosa, AL
11/16/2015*; 6:00 pm		Appalachian State	W 93–59	2–0	Foster Auditorium (2,228); Tuscaloosa, AL
11/22/2015*; 2:00 pm		Mississippi Valley State	W 98–35	3–0	Foster Auditorium (2,392); Tuscaloosa, AL
11/24/2015*; 6:00 pm		Georgia State	W 72–56	4–0	Foster Auditorium (2,261); Tuscaloosa, AL
11/27/2015*; 4:00 pm		vs. Middle Tennessee; Nugget Classic	W 64–46	5–0	Lawlor Events Center; Reno, NV
11/28/2015*; 4:00 pm		vs. Utah Valley; Nugget Classic	W 67–60	6–0	Lawlor Events Center (964); Reno, NV
12/02/2015*; 5:30 pm		at Tennessee–Martin	L 65–83	6–1	Skyhawk Arena (3,018); Martin, TN
12/06/2015*; 2:00 pm		Alcorn State	W 97–50	7–1	Foster Auditorium (1,394); Tuscaloosa, AL
12/12/2015*; 12:00 pm, SECN		Georgetown	W 78–66	8–1	Foster Auditorium (2,291); Tuscaloosa, AL
12/14/2015*; 11:30 am		North Florida	W 69–47	9–1	Coleman Coliseum (4,284); Tuscaloosa, AL
12/18/2015*; 6:00 pm		at Georgia Tech	L 58–70	9–2	Hank McCamish Pavilion (1,828); Atlanta, GA
12/20/2015*; 2:00 pm		Grambling State	W 72–57	10–2	Foster Auditorium (2,474); Tuscaloosa, AL
12/28/2015*; 6:00 pm		Lipscomb	W 68–49	11–2	Foster Auditorium (2,440); Tuscaloosa, AL
SEC regular season
01/03/2016; 2:00 pm, SECN		LSU	W 62–45	12–2 (1–0)	Foster Auditorium (2,705); Tuscaloosa, AL
01/07/2016; 6:00 pm, SECN		at No. 10 Kentucky	L 48–73	12–3 (1–1)	Memorial Coliseum (4,792); Lexington, KY
01/10/2016; 2:00 pm		Vanderbilt	L 48–54	12–4 (1–2)	Foster Auditorium (3,023); Tuscaloosa, AL
01/14/2016; 6:00 pm		at Auburn	L 59–72	12–5 (1–3)	Auburn Arena (3,383); Auburn, AL
01/17/2016; 4:00 pm, SECN		Georgia	W 64–50	13–5 (2–3)	Foster Auditorium (3,732); Tuscaloosa, AL
01/21/2016; 6:00 pm		at No. 22 Florida	L 72–80	13–6 (2–4)	O'Connell Center (1,305); Gainesville, FL
01/25/2016; 6:00 pm, SECN		at Vanderbilt	L 52–67	13–7 (2–5)	Memorial Gymnasium (2,961); Nashville, TN
01/28/2016; 6:00 pm		No. 10 Texas A&M	L 56–59	13–8 (2–6)	Foster Auditorium (2,366); Tuscaloosa, AL
01/31/2016; 2:00 pm, SECN		at No. 19 Tennessee	L 42–70	13–9 (2–7)	Thompson–Boling Arena (12,613); Knoxville, TN
02/04/2016; 6:00 pm		Ole Miss	W 48–37	14–9 (3–7)	Foster Auditorium (2,607); Tuscaloosa, AL
02/07/2016; 1:00 pm, SECN		Auburn	L 55–59	14–10 (3–8)	Foster Auditorium (3,303); Tuscaloosa, AL
02/11/2016; 7:00 pm		at Missouri	L 52–63	14–11 (3–9)	Mizzou Arena (3,028); Columbus, MO
02/18/2016; 7:00 pm		at Arkansas	L 67–69	14–12 (3–10)	Bud Walton Arena (1,591); Fayetteville, AR
02/22/2016; 6:00 pm, SECN		No. 3 South Carolina	L 46–66	14–13 (3–11)	Foster Auditorium (2,649); Tuscaloosa, AL
02/25/2016; 7:30 pm, SECN		Tennessee	W 54–46	15–13 (4–11)	Foster Auditorium (2,767); Tuscaloosa, AL
02/28/2016; 2:00 pm		at No. 16 Mississippi State	L 52–61	15–14 (4–12)	Humphrey Coliseum (6,224); Starkville, MS
2016 SEC Tournament
03/02/2016; 11:00 am, SECN	(12)	vs. (13) LSU; First Round	L 49–58	15–15	Jacksonville Veterans Memorial Arena (2,889); Jacksonville, FL
WNIT
03/16/2016*; 7:00 pm		at Tulane; First Round	L 52–53	15–16	Devlin Fieldhouse (627); New Orleans, LA
*Non-conference game. ^{#}Rankings from AP Poll. (#) Tournament seedings in parentheses. All times are in Central Time.

== See also ==
- 2015–16 Alabama Crimson Tide men's basketball team
