= 2015–16 Southeastern Conference women's basketball season =

2015–16 SEC Women's Basketball Season
- League: NCAA Division I
- Sport: Basketball
- Teams: 14
- TV partner(s): ESPN2, SEC Network, FSN

WNBA Draft
- Top draft pick: Tiffany Mitchell (South Carolina)
- Picked by: Indiana Fever

Regular Season
- Season champions: South Carolina
- Season MVP: A'ja Wilson (South Carolina)

Tournament
- Champions: South Carolina
- Runners-up: Mississippi State
- Finals MVP: Tiffany Mitchell (South Carolina)

Basketball seasons
- ← 2014–15 2016–17 →

2015–16 SEC women's basketball standings
	Conf.				Overall
Team	W		L	PCT	W		L	PCT
No. 3 South Carolina †	16	–	0	1.000	33	–	2	.943
No. 15 Mississippi State	11	–	5	.688	28	–	8	.778
No. 18 Texas A&M	11	–	5	.688	22	–	10	.688
No. 12 Kentucky	10	–	6	.625	25	–	8	.758
No. 25 Florida	10	–	6	.625	22	–	9	.710
Georgia	9	–	7	.563	21	–	10	.677
Missouri	8	–	8	.500	22	–	10	.688
Tennessee	8	–	8	.500	22	–	14	.611
Auburn	8	–	8	.500	20	–	13	.606
Arkansas	7	–	9	.438	12	–	18	.400
Vanderbilt	5	–	11	.313	18	–	14	.563
Alabama	4	–	12	.250	15	–	16	.484
LSU	3	–	13	.188	10	–	21	.323
Ole Miss	2	–	14	.125	10	–	20	.333
† 2016 SEC tournament winner As of March 27, 2016; Rankings from AP poll

The 2015–16 SEC women's basketball season began with practices in October 2015, followed by the start of the 2015–16 NCAA Division I women's basketball season in November. Conference play started in early January 2016 and concluded in March with the 2016 SEC women's basketball tournament at the Jacksonville Veterans Memorial Arena in Jacksonville, Florida.

== Rankings ==
Legend
#	Ranking within Top 25
RV	Not Ranked, but Received Votes
NR	Not Ranked
T	Tied for the same spot in the rankings with another school
	Increase in ranking
	Decrease in ranking
	Not ranked previous week

		Pre	Wk 2	Wk 3	Wk 4	Wk 5	Wk 6	Wk 7	Wk 8	Wk 9	Wk 10	Wk 11	Wk 12	Wk 13	Wk 14	Wk 15	Wk 16	Wk 17	Wk 18	Final
Alabama	AP	NR	NR	NR	NR	NR	NR	NR	NR	NR	NR	NR	NR	NR	NR	NR	NR	NR	NR	NR
Alabama	C	NR	NR	NR	NR	NR	NR	NR	NR	NR	NR	NR	NR	NR	NR	NR	NR	NR	NR	NR
Arkansas	AP	RV	RV	RV	NR	NR	NR	NR	NR	NR	NR	RV	NR	NR	NR	NR	NR	NR	NR	NR
Arkansas	C	NR	NR	NR	NR	NR	NR	NR	NR	NR	NR	NR	NR	NR	NR	NR	NR	NR	NR	NR
Auburn	AP	NR	NR	NR	NR	NR	NR	NR	NR	NR	NR	NR	NR	NR	NR	RV	NR	NR	NR	N/A
Auburn	C	NR	NR	NR	NR	RV	RV	NR	RV	RV	NR	NR	NR	NR	RV	RV	RV	NR	NR	RV
Florida	AP	NR	NR	NR	NR	NR	NR	NR	NR	NR	20	22	NR	22	16	22	NR	25	25	25
Florida	C	NR	NR	NR	NR	NR	NR	NR	NR	NR	21	23	NR	22	18	25	NR	24	25	24
Georgia	AP	NR	NR	NR	NR	NR	NR	NR	NR	NR	NR	NR	NR	NR	NR	NR	NR	NR	NR	NR
Georgia	C	NR	NR	NR	NR	NR	NR	NR	NR	NR	NR	NR	NR	NR	NR	NR	NR	NR	NR	NR
Kentucky	AP	18	13	12	11	8	7	7	6	10	9	9	12	18	18	16	15	13	12	12
Kentucky	C	17	13	11	10	8	8	7	7	9	9	9	12	18	18	16	14	13	13	13
LSU	AP	NR	NR	NR	NR	NR	NR	NR	NR	NR	NR	NR	NR	NR	NR	NR	NR	NR	NR	NR
LSU	C	NR	NR	NR	NR	NR	NR	NR	NR	NR	NR	NR	NR	NR	NR	NR	NR	NR	NR	NR
Mississippi State	AP	11	10	8	9	9	9	8	8	7	7	10	13	11	11	14	16	16	15	15
Mississippi State	C	13	11	10	9	10	9	8	8	6	6	10	13	12	11	13	18	18	16	16
Missouri	AP	NR	NR	NR	NR	NR	NR	NR	NR	NR	NR	NR	NR	NR	NR	NR	NR	NR	NR	NR
Missouri	C	NR	NR	NR	NR	NR	NR	NR	NR	NR	NR	NR	NR	NR	NR	NR	NR	NR	NR	NR
Ole Miss	AP	NR	NR	NR	NR	NR	NR	NR	NR	NR	NR	NR	NR	NR	NR	NR	NR	NR	NR	NR
Ole Miss	C	NR	NR	NR	NR	NR	NR	NR	NR	NR	NR	NR	NR	NR	NR	NR	NR	NR	NR	NR
South Carolina	AP	2	2	2	2	2	2	2	2	2	2	2	2	2	2	3	3	3	3	3
South Carolina	C	2	2	2	2	2	2	2	2	2	2	2	2	2	2	2	2	2	2	5
Tennessee	AP	4	4	4	8	16	14	14	13	12	13	17	18	23	25	24	NR	NR	NR	NR
Tennessee	C	4	5	5	8	15	16	16	16	11	15	22	23	25	NR	NR	NR	NR	NR	19
Texas A&M	AP	13	12	10	12	15	18	16	16	13	15	13	10	12	15	12T	11	15	19	18
Texas A&M	C	16	12	9	11	16	18	14	13T	10	11	12	10	11	13	12	11	15	18	
Vanderbilt	AP	RV	NR	NR	NR	NR	NR	NR	NR	NR	NR	NR	NR	NR	NR	NR	NR	NR	NR	NR
Vanderbilt	C	NR	NR	NR	NR	NR	NR	NR	NR	NR	NR	NR	NR	NR	NR	NR	NR	NR	NR	NR

Rankings source:

== Regular season ==
=== Conference matrix ===
This table summarizes the head-to-head results between teams in conference play.

	Alabama	Arkansas	Auburn	Florida	Georgia	Kentucky	LSU	Mississippi State	Missouri	Ole Miss	South Carolina	Tennessee	Texas A&M	Vanderbilt
vs. Alabama	–	1–0	2–0	1–0	0–1	1–0	0–1	1–0	1–0	0–1	1–0	1–1	1–0	2–0
vs. Arkansas	0–1	–	1–0	1–0	1–0	1–0	0–1	2–0	1–1	0–1	1–0	1–1	0–1	0–1
vs. Auburn	0–2	0–1	–	1–1	1–0	1–1	0–1	1–0	1–0	0–1	1–0	1–0	1–0	0–1
vs. Florida	0–1	0–1	1–1	–	2–0	0–2	0–2	1–0	1–0	0–1	1–0	0–1	0–1	0–1
vs. Georgia	1–0	0–1	0–1	0–2	–	1–0	1–1	0–1	1–1	0–1	1–0	1–0	1–0	0–1
vs. Kentucky	0–1	0–1	1–1	1–0	0–1	–	0–1	0–1	0–1	1–0	2–0	0–1	0–1	1–1
vs. LSU	1–0	1–0	1–0	2–0	1–1	1–0	–	1–0	1–0	0–1	1–0	0–1	2–0	1–0
vs. Mississippi State	0–1	0–2	0–1	0–1	1–0	1–0	0–1	–	1–1	0–2	1–0	0–1	1–0	0–1
vs. Missouri	0–1	1–1	0–1	0–1	1–1	1–0	0–1	1–1	–	0–1	1–0	1–0	1–0	1–0
vs. Ole Miss	1–0	1–0	1–0	1–0	1–0	0–1	1–0	2–0	1–0	–	1–0	1–0	2–0	0–1
vs. South Carolina	0–1	0–1	0–1	0–1	0–1	0–1	0–1	0–1	0–1	0–2	–	0–1	0–2	0–1
vs. Tennessee	1–1	1–1	0–1	1–0	0–1	1–0	1–0	1–0	0–1	0–1	1–0	–	1–0	0–2
vs. Texas A&M	0–1	1–0	0–1	1–0	0–1	1–0	0–2	0–1	0–1	0–2	2–0	0–1	–	0–1
vs. Vanderbilt	0–2	1–0	1–0	1–0	1–0	1–1	0–1	1–0	0–1	1–0	1–0	2–0	1–0	–
Total	4–12	7–9	8–8	10–6	9–7	10–6	3–13	11–5	8–8	2–14	16–0	8–8	11–5	5–11
