= 2015–16 Ole Miss Rebels women's basketball team =

Intercollegiate basketball season

2015–16 Ole Miss Rebels women's basketball
- Conference: Southeastern Conference
- Record: 10–20 (2–14 SEC)
- Head coach: Matt Insell (3rd season)
- Assistant coaches: Alex Simmons; Brittany Hudson; Todd Schaefer
- Home arena: Tad Smith Coliseum; The Pavilion at Ole Miss

2015–16 SEC women's basketball standings
	Conf.				Overall
Team	W		L	PCT	W		L	PCT
No. 3 South Carolina †	16	–	0	1.000	33	–	2	.943
No. 15 Mississippi State	11	–	5	.688	28	–	8	.778
No. 18 Texas A&M	11	–	5	.688	22	–	10	.688
No. 12 Kentucky	10	–	6	.625	25	–	8	.758
No. 25 Florida	10	–	6	.625	22	–	9	.710
Georgia	9	–	7	.563	21	–	10	.677
Missouri	8	–	8	.500	22	–	10	.688
Tennessee	8	–	8	.500	22	–	14	.611
Auburn	8	–	8	.500	20	–	13	.606
Arkansas	7	–	9	.438	12	–	18	.400
Vanderbilt	5	–	11	.313	18	–	14	.563
Alabama	4	–	12	.250	15	–	16	.484
LSU	3	–	13	.188	10	–	21	.323
Ole Miss	2	–	14	.125	10	–	20	.333
† 2016 SEC tournament winner As of March 27, 2016; Rankings from AP poll

The 2015–16 Ole Miss Rebels women's basketball team represented University of Mississippi during the 2015–16 NCAA Division I women's basketball season. The Rebels are members of the Southeastern Conference (SEC) and were led by third-year head coach Matt Insell.The Rebels started the season playing their home games at Tad Smith Coliseum, but moved to the new Pavilion at Ole Miss on January 10, 2016. They finished the season 10–20, 2–14 in SEC play to finish in last place. They lost in the first round of the SEC women's tournament Vanderbilt.

== Roster ==
2015–16 Ole Miss Rebels women's basketball team
Players
Coaches

Pos.	#	Name	Height	Year	Previous school	Hometown
G	0	Kiara Golden	5 ft 8 in (1.73 m)	Fr	Center Hill HS	Olive Branch, MS
F/C	2	Jonell Williams	6 ft 3 in (1.91 m)	Fr	Palatka HS	Palatka, FL
G	3	A'Queen Hayes	5 ft 8 in (1.73 m)	So	Horn Lake HS	Horn Lake, MS
G/F	4	Precious Person	6 ft 1 in (1.85 m)	RS Jr	Riverdale HS; Rutgers	Jonesboro, GA
G	5	Erika Sisk	5 ft 9 in (1.75 m)	Jr	Oxford HS; Murray State	Oxford, MS
F/C	10	Cecilia Muhate Pena	6 ft 2 in (1.88 m)	Fr	XXXX	Madrid, Spain
F	11	Shequila Joseph	6 ft 3 in (1.91 m)	Jr	Barking Abbey School	London, England
F	15	Kelsey Briggs	6 ft 3 in (1.91 m)	So	Overton HS	Memphis, TN
G	20	Madinah Muhammad	5 ft 8 in (1.73 m)	Fr	Whitney Young HS	Chicago, IL
G	23	Shandricka Sessom	5 ft 10 in (1.78 m)	So	Byhalia HS	Byhalia, MS
F	24	Bretta Hart	6 ft 1 in (1.85 m)	Jr	Bay HS	Poplarville, MS
G	25	Alissa Alston	5 ft 8 in (1.73 m)	Fr	Upper Room Christian Academy	New Haven, CT
G	44	Torri Lewis	5 ft 11 in (1.8 m)	Fr	Homeschool	Olive Branch, MS

Head coach

- Matt Insell (Middle Tennessee)

Assistant coach(es)

- Alex Simmons (Tennessee)
- Brittany Hudson (Georgia State)
- Todd Schaefer (Thomas More)

Legend

- (C) Team captain
- (S) Suspended
- (I) Ineligible
- (W) Walk-on
- Injured
- Current redshirt

Roster

== Schedule ==
Date time, TV	Rank^{#}	Opponent^{#}	Result	Record	Site (attendance) city, state
Exhibition
11/06/2015*; 5:00 pm		Christian Brothers	W 100–53		Tad Smith Coliseum; Oxford, MS
Non-conference regular season
11/13/2015*; 11:00 am		Mississippi Valley State	W 97–61	1–0	Tad Smith Coliseum (7,407); Oxford, MS
11/15/2015*; 2:00 pm		Louisiana–Lafayette	L 78–82	1–1	Tad Smith Coliseum (789); Oxford, MS
11/19/2015*; 6:00 pm		Missouri State	L 78–91	1–2	Tad Smith Coliseum (743); Oxford, MS
11/22/2015*; 1:00 pm, FSN		at Middle Tennessee	L 75–84	1–3	Murphy Center (6,605); Murfreesboro, TN
11/27/2015*; 1:00 pm		at Stony Brook	W 72–57	2–3	Island Federal Credit Union Arena (898); Stony Brook, NY
11/29/2015*; 12:00 pm		at Wagner	W 86–49	3–3	Spiro Sports Center (732); Staten Island, NY
12/02/2015*; 6:00 pm		WKU	W 59–53	4–3	Tad Smith Coliseum (906); Oxford, MS
12/06/2015*; 2:00 pm		Arkansas–Pine Bluff	W 80–45	5–3	Tad Smith Coliseum (835); Oxford, MS
12/12/2015*; 4:00 pm		at Southern Miss	L 38–57	5–4	Reed Green Coliseum (1,632); Hattiesburg, MS
12/14/2015*; 6:00 pm		New Orleans	W 97–59	6–4	Tad Smith Coliseum (697); Oxford, MS
12/16/2015*; 6:00 pm		Tulane	L 59–61	6–5	Tad Smith Coliseum (734); Oxford, MS
12/19/2015*; 12:00 pm		McNeese State	W 96–56	7–5	Tad Smith Coliseum (881); Oxford, MS
12/29/2015*; 6:00 pm		Alabama A&M	W 103–42	8–5	Tad Smith Coliseum (1,061); Oxford, MS
SEC regular season
01/03/2016; 2:00 pm		Vanderbilt	W 55–52	9–5 (1–0)	Tad Smith Coliseum (1,283); Oxford, MS
01/07/2016; 7:30 pm, SECN		at LSU	L 56–76	9–6 (1–1)	Maravich Center (2,189); Baton Rouge, LA
01/10/2016; 1:00 pm, SECN		Florida	L 65–85	9–7 (1–2)	The Pavilion at Ole Miss (2,468); Oxford, MS
01/14/2016; 7:00 pm		at No. 15 Texas A&M	L 58–81	9–8 (1–3)	Reed Arena (4,033); College Station, TX
01/18/2016; 6:00 pm, SECN		at No. 10 Mississippi State	L 51–79	9–9 (1–4)	Humphrey Coliseum (7,128); Starkville, MS
01/21/2016; 8:00 pm, SECN		No. 9 Kentucky	W 73–65	10–9 (2–4)	The Pavilion at Ole Miss (1,335); Oxford, MS
01/28/2016; 6:00 pm		at No. 2 South Carolina	L 62–81	10–10 (2–5)	Colonial Life Arena (14,313); Columbia, SC
01/31/2016; 4:00 pm, SECN		No. 22 Missouri	L 46–60	10–11 (2–6)	The Pavilion at Ole Miss (1,686); Oxford, MS
02/04/2016; 6:00 pm		at Alabama	L 37–48	10–12 (2–7)	Foster Auditorium (2,607); Tuscaloosa, AL
02/07/2016; 1:00 pm		at Georgia	L 56–70	10–13 (2–8)	Stegeman Coliseum (3,826); Athens, GA
02/11/2016; 6:00 pm		Auburn	L 60–65	10–14 (2–9)	The Pavilion at Ole Miss (1,335); Oxford, MS
02/15/2016; 6:00 pm, SECN		No. 12 Texas A&M	L 48–62	10–15 (2–10)	The Pavilion at Ole Miss (1,691); Oxford, MS
02/21/2016; 6:00 pm		at No. 24 Tennessee	L 51–57	10–16 (2–11)	Thompson–Boling Arena (10,548); Knoxville, TN
02/21/2016; 4:00 pm, ESPN2		No. 14 Mississippi State	L 51–60	10–17 (2–12)	The Pavilion at Ole Miss (4,411); Oxford, MS
02/25/2016; 8:00 pm, SECN		No. 3 South Carolina	L 45–66	10–18 (2–13)	The Pavilion at Ole Miss (1,473); Oxford, MS
02/28/2016; 3:00 pm, SECN		at Arkansas	L 49–60	10–19 (2–14)	Bud Walton Arena (3,132); Fayetteville, AR
SEC Women's Tournament
03/02/2016; 12:30 pm, SECN		vs. Vanderbilt; First Round	L 59–74	10–20	Jacksonville Veterans Memorial Arena (2,889); Jacksonville, FL
*Non-conference game. ^{#}Rankings from AP Poll. (#) Tournament seedings in parentheses. All times are in Central Time.

== See also ==
2015–16 Ole Miss Rebels men's basketball team
