= 2015–16 Texas A&M Aggies women's basketball team =

Intercollegiate basketball season

2015–16 Texas A&M Aggies women's basketball

NCAA tournament, second round
- Conference: Southeastern Conference

Ranking
- Coaches: No. 20
- AP: No. 18
- Record: 22–10 (11–5 SEC)
- Head coach: Gary Blair (13th season)
- Assistant coaches: Kelly Bond-White; Bob Starkey; Amy Wright
- Home arena: Reed Arena

2015–16 SEC women's basketball standings
	Conf.				Overall
Team	W		L	PCT	W		L	PCT
No. 3 South Carolina †	16	–	0	1.000	33	–	2	.943
No. 15 Mississippi State	11	–	5	.688	28	–	8	.778
No. 18 Texas A&M	11	–	5	.688	22	–	10	.688
No. 12 Kentucky	10	–	6	.625	25	–	8	.758
No. 25 Florida	10	–	6	.625	22	–	9	.710
Georgia	9	–	7	.563	21	–	10	.677
Missouri	8	–	8	.500	22	–	10	.688
Tennessee	8	–	8	.500	22	–	14	.611
Auburn	8	–	8	.500	20	–	13	.606
Arkansas	7	–	9	.438	12	–	18	.400
Vanderbilt	5	–	11	.313	18	–	14	.563
Alabama	4	–	12	.250	15	–	16	.484
LSU	3	–	13	.188	10	–	21	.323
Ole Miss	2	–	14	.125	10	–	20	.333
† 2016 SEC tournament winner As of March 27, 2016; Rankings from AP poll

The 2015–16 Texas A&M Aggies women's basketball team represented Texas A&M University in the 2015–16 college basketball season. The team's head coach was Gary Blair, who was in his thirteenth season at Texas A&M. The team played their home games at the Reed Arena in College Station, Texas and played in their fourth season as a member of the Southeastern Conference. They finished the season 22–10, 11–5 in SEC play to finish in a tie for second place. They lost in the quarterfinals of the SEC women's tournament to Tennessee. They received an at-large bid to the NCAA women's tournament, where they defeated Missouri State in the first round before losing to Florida State in the second round.

== Roster ==
2015–16 Texas A&M Aggies women's basketball team
Players
Coaches

Pos.	#	Name	Height	Year	Previous school	Hometown
C	00	Khaalia Hillsman	6 ft 5 in (1.96 m)	So	Whitney Young	Chicago, IL
G/F	1	Courtney Williams	6 ft 1 in (1.85 m)	Sr	North Shore	Houston, TX
F	3	Taylor Cooper	6 ft 0 in (1.83 m)	RS Jr	Oral Roberts; Shawnee	Shawnee, OK
F	5	Anriel Howard	6 ft 0 in (1.83 m)	Fr	Westlake	Atlanta, GA
G	10	Shlonte Allen	5 ft 8 in (1.73 m)	RS Jr	Trinity Valley CC; Arcada	Arcadia, LA
G	11	Curtyce Knox	5 ft 7 in (1.7 m)	RS Jr	Atascocita	Humble, TX
G	12	Danni Williams	5 ft 10 in (1.78 m)	Fr	Clovis	Clovis, NM
G	13	Chelsea Jennings	5 ft 9 in (1.75 m)	Sr	North Crowley	Fort Worth, TX
G/F	21	Jasmine Lumpkin	6 ft 0 in (1.83 m)	RS Fr	Michigan State; Joliet Catholic Academy	Bolingbrook, IL
C	23	Rachel Mitchell	6 ft 7 in (2.01 m)	Sr	Atascocita	Houston, TX
G	24	Jordan Jones	5 ft 6 in (1.68 m)	Jr	DeSoto	DeSoto, TX
G	33	Courtney Walker	5 ft 8 in (1.73 m)	Sr	Santa Fe	Edmond, OK

Head coach

- Gary Blair (Texas Tech)

Assistant coach(es)

- Kelly Bond-White (Illinois)
- Bob Starkey (LSU)
- Amy Wright (Arkansas)

Legend

- (C) Team captain
- (S) Suspended
- (I) Ineligible
- (W) Walk-on
- Injured
- Current redshirt

Roster

== Rankings ==
Regular season polls
Poll	Pre- season	Week 2	Week 3	Week 4	Week 5	Week 6	Week 7	Week 8	Week 9	Week 10	Week 11	Week 12	Week 13	Week 14	Week 15	Week 16	Week 17	Week 18	Week 19	Final
AP	13	12	10	12	15	18	16	16	13	15	13	10	12	15	12т	11	15	19	18	N/A
Coaches	16	12	9	11	16	18	14	13т	10	11	12	10	11	13	12	11	15	18	18	20

Legend
	Increase in ranking
	Decrease in ranking
	Not ranked previous week
(RV)	Received votes

== Schedule and results ==
Date time, TV	Rank^{#}	Opponent^{#}	Result	Record	Site (attendance) city, state
Exhibition
11/01/2015*; 2:00 pm	No. 13	Texas Wesleyan	W 92–40		Reed Arena (3,034); College Station, TX
Non-conference games
11/13/2015*; 6:00 pm	No. 13	Texas State	W 87–50	1–0	Reed Arena (3,575); College Station, TX
11/15/2015*; 4:00 pm	No. 13	Southern	W 88–47	2–0	Reed Arena (3,611); College Station, TX
11/18/2015*; 6:00 pm, ESPN3	No. 12	at No. 14 Duke	W 72–66 ^{OT}	3–0	Cameron Indoor Stadium (3,708); Durham, NC
11/21/2015*; 12:30 pm	No. 12	TCU	W 82–78	4–0	Reed Arena (4,013); College Station, TX
11/27/2015*; 2:00 pm	No. 10	vs. No. 16 California; South Point Thanksgiving Shootout	W 75–58	5–0	South Point Arena; Enterprise, NV
11/28/2015*; 2:00 pm	No. 10	vs. No. 11 Ohio State; South Point Thanksgiving Shootout	L 80–95	5–1	South Point Arena; Enterprise, NV
12/04/2015*; 9:00 pm	No. 12	vs. Hawaiʻi; Tom Weston Invitational	W 82–41	6–1	George Q. Cannon Activities Center (150); Laie, HI
12/05/2015*; 6:00 pm	No. 12	vs. BYU; Tom Weston Invitational	L 64–72	6–2	George Q. Cannon Activities Center (269); Laie, HI
12/07/2015*; 11:00 am, SECN	No. 15	SMU	W 67–55	7–2	Reed Arena (8,004); College Station, TX
12/12/2015*; 2:00 pm, SECN	No. 15	No. 18 DePaul	L 66–80	7–3	Reed Arena (3,721); College Station, TX
12/20/2015*; 4:00 pm, FS1	No. 18	vs. No. 17 Oklahoma; Big 12/SEC Women's Challenge	W 74–68	8–3	Chesapeake Energy Arena (2,403); Oklahoma City, OK
12/22/2015*; 12:00 pm, SECN	No. 16	Little Rock	W 69–39	9–3	Reed Arena (3,852); College Station, TX
12/29/2015*; 2:00 pm	No. 16	Prairie View A&M	W 88–30	10–3	Reed Arena (4,124); College Station, TX
Conference games
01/03/2016; 4:00 pm, SECN	No. 16	Georgia	W 73–62	11–3 (1–0)	Reed Arena (5,027); College Station, TX
01/07/2016; 7:00 pm, SECN	No. 13	at Arkansas	L 61–67	11–4 (1–1)	Bud Walton Arena (1,494); Fayetteville, AR
01/10/2016; 3:00 pm, SECN	No. 13	at LSU	W 53–35	12–4 (2–1)	Pete Maravich Assembly Center (3,774); Baton Rouge, LA
01/14/2016; 7:00 pm	No. 15	Ole Miss	W 81–58	13–4 (3–1)	Reed Arena (4,033); College Station, TX
01/17/2016; 12:00 pm, ESPN2	No. 15	at No. 2 South Carolina	L 58–59	13–5 (3–2)	Colonial Life Arena (15,406); Columbia, SC
01/21/2016; 7:00 pm	No. 13	No. 23 Missouri	W 81–77 ^{OT}	14–5 (4–2)	Reed Arena (3,844); College Station, TX
01/28/2016; 6:00 pm	No. 10	at Alabama	W 59–56	15–5 (5–2)	Foster Auditorium (2,366); Tuscaloosa, AL
01/31/2016; 5:00 pm, ESPNU	No. 10	No. 2 South Carolina	L 63–70	15–6 (5–3)	Reed Arena (8,511); College Station, TX
02/04/2016; 6:00 pm	No. 12	at No. 22 Florida	L 81–83	15–7 (5–4)	O'Connell Center (1,404); Gainesville, FL
02/07/2016; 3:00 pm, ESPN	No. 12	No. 23 Tennessee	W 76–71 ^{OT}	16–7 (6–4)	Reed Arena (4,791); College Station, TX
02/11/2016; 6:00 pm, SECN	No. 15	No. 11 Mississippi State	W 64–58	17–7 (7–4)	Reed Arena (5,645); College Station, TX
02/15/2016; 6:00 pm, SECN	No. 12	at Ole Miss	W 62–48	18–7 (8–4)	The Pavilion at Ole Miss (1,691); Oxford, MS
02/18/2016; 8:00 pm, SECN	No. 12	LSU	W 68–54	19–7 (9–4)	Reed Arena (4,797); College Station, TX
02/21/2016; 4:00 pm, SECN	No. 12	at Vanderbilt	W 75–63	20–7 (10–4)	Memorial Gymnasium (2,975); Nashville, TN
02/25/2016; 6:30 pm, SECN	No. 11	at Auburn	W 57–49	21–7 (11–4)	Auburn Arena (3,651); Auburn, AL
02/28/2016; 3:00 pm, ESPN	No. 11	No. 15 Kentucky	L 58–71	21–8 (11–5)	Reed Arena (7,133); College Station, TX
SEC Women's Tournament
03/04/2016; 5:00 pm, SECN	No. 15	vs. Tennessee; Quarterfinals	L 60–70	21–9	Jacksonville Veterans Memorial Arena (4,214); Jacksonville, FL
NCAA Women's Tournament
03/19/2016*; 3:00 pm, ESPN2	(4 D) No. 18	(13 D) Missouri State; First Round	W 74–65	22–9	Reed Arena (4,040); College Station, TX
03/21/2016*; 5:30 pm, ESPN2	(4 D) No. 18	(5 D) No. 17 Florida State; Second Round	L 56–74	22–10	Reed Arena (4,013); College Station, TX
*Non-conference game. ^{#}Rankings from AP Poll. (#) Tournament seedings in parentheses. D=Dallas Region. All times are in Central Time.

== See also ==
- 2015–16 NCAA Division I women's basketball rankings
- 2015–16 Texas A&M Aggies men's basketball team
