= 2016 SEC women's basketball tournament =

- Classification: Division I
- Season: 2015–16
- Teams: 14
- Site: Jacksonville Veterans Memorial Arena; Jacksonville, FL
- Champions: South Carolina (2nd title)
- Winning coach: Dawn Staley (2nd title)
- MVP: Tiffany Mitchell (South Carolina)
- Attendance: 29,526
- Television: SEC Network, ESPN, ESPNU

2015–16 SEC women's basketball standings
| | Conf. | | | | Overall |
| Team | W | | L | PCT | W | | L | PCT |
|---|---|---|---|---|---|---|---|---|
| No. 3 South Carolina † | 16 | – | 0 | 1.000 | 33 | – | 2 | .943 |
| No. 15 Mississippi State | 11 | – | 5 | .688 | 28 | – | 8 | .778 |
| No. 18 Texas A&M | 11 | – | 5 | .688 | 22 | – | 10 | .688 |
| No. 12 Kentucky | 10 | – | 6 | .625 | 25 | – | 8 | .758 |
| No. 25 Florida | 10 | – | 6 | .625 | 22 | – | 9 | .710 |
| Georgia | 9 | – | 7 | .563 | 21 | – | 10 | .677 |
| Missouri | 8 | – | 8 | .500 | 22 | – | 10 | .688 |
| Tennessee | 8 | – | 8 | .500 | 22 | – | 14 | .611 |
| Auburn | 8 | – | 8 | .500 | 20 | – | 13 | .606 |
| Arkansas | 7 | – | 9 | .438 | 12 | – | 18 | .400 |
| Vanderbilt | 5 | – | 11 | .313 | 18 | – | 14 | .563 |
| Alabama | 4 | – | 12 | .250 | 15 | – | 16 | .484 |
| LSU | 3 | – | 13 | .188 | 10 | – | 21 | .323 |
| Ole Miss | 2 | – | 14 | .125 | 10 | – | 20 | .333 |
† 2016 SEC tournament winner As of March 27, 2016; Rankings from AP poll

The 2016 Southeastern Conference women's basketball tournament was a postseason women's basketball tournament for the Southeastern Conference held at Jacksonville Veterans Memorial Arena in Jacksonville, Florida from March 2 through 6, 2016. South Carolina won the SEC Women's Tournament for the 2nd year in a row and earned an automatic bid to the 2016 NCAA Women's Division I Basketball Tournament.

== Seeds ==
| Seed | School | Conference record | Overall record | Tiebreaker |
|---|---|---|---|---|
| 1 | South Carolina ‡ | 16–0 | 28–1 | |
| 2 | Texas A&M † | 11–5 | 21–8 | 1–0 vs. MISS STATE |
| 3 | Mississippi State † | 11–5 | 24–6 | 0–1 vs. TEXAS A&M |
| 4 | Florida † | 10–6 | 22–7 | 1–0 vs. KENTUCKY |
| 5 | Kentucky # | 10–6 | 21–6 | 0–1 vs. FLORIDA |
| 6 | Georgia # | 9–7 | 21–8 | |
| 7 | Tennessee # | 8–8 | 17–12 | 2–0 vs. AUBURN, MIZZOU |
| 8 | Missouri # | 8–8 | 21–8 | 1–1 vs. AUBURN, TENN |
| 9 | Auburn # | 8–8 | 18–11 | 0–2 vs. MIZZOU, TENN |
| 10 | Arkansas # | 7–9 | 12–17 | |
| 11 | Vanderbilt | 5–11 | 16–13 | |
| 12 | Alabama | 4–12 | 15–14 | |
| 13 | LSU | 3–13 | 9–20 | |
| 14 | Ole Miss | 2–14 | 10–19 | |
‡ – SEC regular season champions, and tournament No. 1 seed. † – Received a double-bye in the conference tournament. # – Received a single-bye in the conference tournament. Overall records include all games played in the SEC Tournament.

== Schedule ==
| Game | Time* | Matchup^{#} | Television | Attendance |
First round – Wednesday, March 2
| 1 | 11:00 AM | #12 Alabama vs. #13 LSU | SECN | 2,889 |
| 2 | 1:30 PM | #11 Vanderbilt vs. #14 Ole Miss | SECN | 2,889 |
Second round – Thursday, March 3
| 3 | 12:00 PM | #8 Missouri vs. #9 Auburn | SECN | 2,245 |
| 4 | 2:30 PM | #5 Kentucky vs. #13 LSU | SECN | 2,245 |
| 5 | 6:00 PM | #7 Tennessee vs. #10 Arkansas | SECN | 3,094 |
| 6 | 8:30 PM | #6 Georgia vs. #11 Vanderbilt | SECN | 3,094 |
Quarterfinals – Friday, March 4
| 7 | 12:00 PM | #1 South Carolina vs. #9 Auburn | SECN | 4,703 |
| 8 | 2:30 PM | #4 Florida vs. #5 Kentucky | SECN | 4,703 |
| 9 | 6:00 PM | #2 Texas A&M vs. #7 Tennessee | SECN | 4,214 |
| 10 | 8:30 PM | #3 Mississippi State vs. #11 Vanderbilt | SECN | 4,214 |
Semifinals – Saturday, March 5
| 11 | 5:00 PM | #1 South Carolina vs #5 Kentucky | ESPNU | 5,632 |
| 12 | 7:30 PM | #7 Tennessee vs #3 Mississippi State | ESPNU | 5,632 |
Championship – Sunday, March 6
| 13 | 2:30 PM | #1 South Carolina vs #3 Mississippi State | ESPN | 6,549 |
*Game times in EST. # – Rankings denote tournament seed

== Bracket ==
First round Wednesday, March 2 SEC Network
12 | Alabama | 49
13 | LSU | 58
11 | Vanderbilt | 74
14 | Ole Miss | 59

Second round Thursday, March 3 SEC Network
8 | Missouri | 45
9 | Auburn | 47
5 | Kentucky | 79
13 | LSU | 71
7 | Tennessee | 68
10 | Arkansas | 51
6 | Georgia | 49
11 | Vanderbilt | 54^{OT}

Quarterfinals; Friday, March 4 SEC Network
1 | South Carolina | 57
9 | Auburn | 48
4 | Florida | 69
5 | Kentucky | 92
2 | Texas A&M | 60
7 | Tennessee | 70
3 | Mississippi State | 63
11 | Vanderbilt | 46

Semifinals; Saturday, March 5 ESPNU
1 | South Carolina | 93
5 | Kentucky | 63
7 | Tennessee | 48
3 | Mississippi State | 58

Championship; Sunday, March 6 ESPN
1 | South Carolina | 66
3 | Mississippi State | 52

== See also ==
- 2016 SEC men's basketball tournament
