= 2015–16 Kentucky Wildcats women's basketball team =

Intercollegiate basketball season

2015–16 Kentucky Wildcats women's basketball

NCAA tournament, Sweet Sixteen
- Conference: Southeastern Conference

Ranking
- Coaches: No. 15
- AP: No. 12
- Record: 25–8 (10–6 SEC)
- Head coach: Matthew Mitchell (9th season)
- Assistant coaches: Adeniyi Amadou; Camryn Whitaker; Tamika Williams
- Home arena: Memorial Coliseum; Rupp Arena

2015–16 SEC women's basketball standings
	Conf.				Overall
Team	W		L	PCT	W		L	PCT
No. 3 South Carolina †	16	–	0	1.000	33	–	2	.943
No. 15 Mississippi State	11	–	5	.688	28	–	8	.778
No. 18 Texas A&M	11	–	5	.688	22	–	10	.688
No. 12 Kentucky	10	–	6	.625	25	–	8	.758
No. 25 Florida	10	–	6	.625	22	–	9	.710
Georgia	9	–	7	.563	21	–	10	.677
Missouri	8	–	8	.500	22	–	10	.688
Tennessee	8	–	8	.500	22	–	14	.611
Auburn	8	–	8	.500	20	–	13	.606
Arkansas	7	–	9	.438	12	–	18	.400
Vanderbilt	5	–	11	.313	18	–	14	.563
Alabama	4	–	12	.250	15	–	16	.484
LSU	3	–	13	.188	10	–	21	.323
Ole Miss	2	–	14	.125	10	–	20	.333
† 2016 SEC tournament winner As of March 27, 2016; Rankings from AP poll

The 2015–16 Kentucky Wildcats women's basketball team represented University of Kentucky during the 2015–16 NCAA Division I women's basketball season. The Wildcats, led by ninth-year head coach Matthew Mitchell, played their home games at the Memorial Coliseum, with two games at Rupp Arena and were members of the Southeastern Conference. They finished the season 25–8, 10–6 in SEC play to finish in a tie for fourth place. They advanced to the semifinals of the SEC women's tournament, where they lost to South Carolina. They received an at-large bid to the NCAA women's tournament, where they defeated UNC Asheville and Oklahoma in the first and second rounds before being upset by Washington the sweet sixteen.

== Roster ==
2015–16 Kentucky Wildcats women's basketball team
Players
Coaches

Pos.	#	Name	Height	Year	Previous school	Hometown
F	1	Batouly Camara	6 ft 2 in (1.88 m)	Fr	Blair Academy	New York, NY
C	2	Ivana Jakubcova	6 ft 6 in (1.98 m)	Sr	Murray State (OK)	Bratislava, Slovakia
PG	3	Janee Thompson	5 ft 7 in (1.7 m)	Sr	Whitney Young	Chicago, IL
G	4	Maci Morris	6 ft 0 in (1.83 m)	Fr	Bell County	Pineville, KY
F	13	Evelyn Akhator	6 ft 2 in (1.88 m)	Jr	Chipola College	Lagos, Nigeria
G	22	Makenzie Cann (redshirt)	6 ft 0 in (1.83 m)	So	Cincinnati	Lawrenceburg, KY
PG	24	Taylor Murray	5 ft 6 in (1.68 m)	Fr	Annapolis Area Christian	Odenton, MD
G	25	Makayla Epps	5 ft 10 in (1.78 m)	Jr	Marion County	Lebanon, KY
F	35	Alexis Jennings	6 ft 2 in (1.88 m)	So	Sparkman	Madison, AL
C	45	Alyssa Rice	6 ft 3 in (1.91 m)	So	Reynoldsburg	Reynoldsburg, OH

Head coach

Matthew Mitchell (Mississippi State)

Assistant coach(es)

Adeniyi Amadou (Syracuse)
Camryn Whitaker (Western Kentucky)
Tamika Williams (Connecticut)

Legend

- (C) Team captain
- (S) Suspended
- (I) Ineligible
- (W) Walk-on
- Injured
- Current redshirt

Roster
Last update: done

== Schedule ==
Date time, TV	Rank^{#}	Opponent^{#}	Result	Record	Site (attendance) city, state
Exhibition
11/08/2015*; 5:00 pm	No. 18	Union (TN)	W 95–63		Memorial Coliseum (2,095); Lexington, KY
Non-conference regular season
11/13/2015*; 7:00 pm	No. 18	Rice	W 72–39	1–0	Memorial Coliseum (4,907); Lexington, KY
11/15/2015*; 5:30 pm, P12N	No. 18	at No. 15 Arizona State	W 68–64 ^{OT}	2–0	Wells Fargo Arena (4,543); Tempe, AZ
11/18/2015*; 7:00 pm	No. 13	Morehead State	W 112–57	3–0	Memorial Coliseum (4,895); Lexington, KY
11/22/2015*; 2:00 pm	No. 13	Colorado	W 86–61	4–0	Memorial Coliseum (5,380); Lexington, KY
11/25/2015*; 12:00 pm	No. 12	Eastern Michigan	W 89–67	5–0	Memorial Coliseum (4,988); Lexington, KY
11/29/2015*; 2:00 pm	No. 12	Jackson State	W 92–24	6–0	Memorial Coliseum (5,010); Lexington, KY
12/02/2015*; 7:00 pm	No. 11	at Northern Kentucky	W 84–65	7–0	BB&T Arena (4,084); Highland Heights, KY
12/10/2015*; 7:00 pm, SECN	No. 8	Louisville; The Battle for the Bluegrass	W 72–54	8–0	Rupp Arena (14,425); Lexington, KY
12/13/2015*; 3:00 pm	No. 8	at Middle Tennessee	W 68–52	9–0	Murphy Center (5,190); Murfreesboro, TN
12/20/2015*; 7:00 pm, SECN	No. 8	No. 13 Duke	W 71–61	10–0	Rupp Arena (17,150); Lexington, KY
12/28/2015*; 7:00 pm, SECN	No. 7	Tennessee State	W 81–39	11–0	Memorial Coliseum (5,586); Lexington, KY
SEC regular season
01/03/2016; 3:00 pm	No. 7	at Auburn	L 61–66	11–1 (0–1)	Auburn Arena (2,677); Auburn, AL
01/07/2016; 7:00 pm, SECN	No. 10	Alabama	W 73–48	12–1 (1–1)	Memorial Coliseum (4,792); Lexington, KY
01/10/2016; 2:00 pm	No. 10	at Georgia	W 64–53	13–1 (2–1)	Stegeman Coliseum (2,681); Athens, GA
01/14/2016; 7:00 pm, SECN	No. 9	No. 2 South Carolina	L 62–73	13–2 (2–2)	Memorial Coliseum (5,527); Lexington, KY
01/17/2016; 1:00 pm, SECN	No. 9	Auburn	W 54–47	14–2 (3–2)	Memorial Coliseum (6,171); Lexington, KY
01/21/2016; 9:00 pm, SECN	No. 9	at Ole Miss	L 65–73	14–3 (3–3)	The Pavilion at Ole Miss (1,335); Oxford, MS
01/25/2016; 7:00 pm, ESPN2	No. 12	No. 19 Tennessee; Rivalry	W 64–63	15–3 (4–3)	Memorial Coliseum (6,188); Lexington, KY
01/28/2016; 7:00 pm	No. 12	Vanderbilt	L 69–71	15–4 (4–4)	Memorial Coliseum (5,193); Lexington, KY
01/31/2016; 1:00 pm, SECN	No. 12	at Florida	L 79–85	15–5 (4–5)	O'Connell Center (3,231); Gainesville, FL
02/04/2016; 7:00 pm, SECN	No. 18	at No. 2 South Carolina	L 68–78	15–6 (4–6)	Colonial Life Arena (15,015); Columbia, SC
02/07/2016; 12:00 pm, SECN	No. 18	LSU	W 70–58	16–6 (5–6)	Memorial Coliseum (6,110); Lexington, KY
02/14/2016; 4:00 pm, SECN	No. 18	at Vanderbilt	W 71–55	17–6 (6–6)	Memorial Gymnasium; Nashville, TN
02/18/2016; 7:00 pm, SECN	No. 16	at No. 14 Mississippi State	W 83–60	18–6 (7–6)	Humphrey Coliseum (4,355); Starkville, MS
02/21/2016; 3:00 pm, SECN	No. 16	Arkansas	W 77–63	19–6 (8–6)	Memorial Coliseum (7,589); Lexington, KY
02/26/2016; 7:00 pm, SECN	No. 15	No. 24 Missouri	W 79–69	20–6 (9–6)	Memorial Coliseum (6,496); Lexington, KY
02/28/2016; 4:00 pm, ESPN	No. 15	at No. 11 Texas A&M	W 71–58	21–6 (10–6)	Reed Arena (7,133); College Station, TX
SEC Women's Tournament
03/03/2016; 2:30 pm, SECN	No. 13	vs. LSU; Second Round	W 79–71	22–6	Jacksonville Veterans Memorial Arena (2,245); Jacksonville, FL
03/03/2016; 2:30 pm, SECN	No. 13	vs. No. 25 Florida; Quarterfinals	W 92–69	23–6	Jacksonville Veterans Memorial Arena (4,703); Jacksonville, FL
03/05/2016; 5:00 pm, ESPNU	No. 13	vs. No. 3 South Carolina; Semifinals	L 63–93	23–7	Jacksonville Veterans Memorial Arena; Jacksonville, FL
NCAA Women's Tournament
03/19/2016*; 4:00 pm, ESPN2	(3 L) No. 12	(14 L) UNC Asheville; First Round	W 85–31	24–7	Memorial Coliseum (2,701); Lexington, KY
03/21/2016*; 6:30 pm, ESPN2	(3 L) No. 12	(6 L) No. 24 Oklahoma; Second Round	W 79–58	25–7	Memorial Coliseum (3,056); Lexington, KY
03/25/2016*; 7:00 pm, ESPN2	(3 L) No. 12	vs. (7 L) Washington; Sweet Sixteen	L 72–85	25–8	Rupp Arena; Lexington, KY
*Non-conference game. ^{#}Rankings from AP Poll. (#) Tournament seedings in parentheses. L=Lexington Region. All times are in Eastern Time.

== Rankings ==
Regular season polls
Poll	Pre- season	Week 2	Week 3	Week 4	Week 5	Week 6	Week 7	Week 8	Week 9	Week 10	Week 11	Week 12	Week 13	Week 14	Week 15	Week 16	Week 17	Week 18	Week 19	Final
AP	18	13	12	11	8	8	7	7	10	9	9	12	18	18	16	15	13	12	12	N/A
Coaches	17	13	11	10	8	8	7	7	9	9	9	12	18	18	16	14	13	13	13	15

Legend
	Increase in ranking
	Decrease in ranking
	Not ranked previous week
(RV)	Received votes

== See also ==
- 2015–16 Kentucky Wildcats men's basketball team
- Kentucky Wildcats women's basketball
