= 2015–16 Tennessee Lady Volunteers basketball team =

Intercollegiate basketball season

2015–16 Tennessee Lady Volunteers basketball

NCAA tournament, Elite Eight
- Conference: Southeastern Conference

Ranking
- Coaches: No. 19
- Record: 22–14 (8–8 SEC)
- Head coach: Holly Warlick (4th season)
- Assistant coaches: Kyra Elzy; Jolette Law; Dean Lockwood
- Home arena: Thompson–Boling Arena

2015–16 SEC women's basketball standings
	Conf.				Overall
Team	W		L	PCT	W		L	PCT
No. 3 South Carolina †	16	–	0	1.000	33	–	2	.943
No. 15 Mississippi State	11	–	5	.688	28	–	8	.778
No. 18 Texas A&M	11	–	5	.688	22	–	10	.688
No. 12 Kentucky	10	–	6	.625	25	–	8	.758
No. 25 Florida	10	–	6	.625	22	–	9	.710
Georgia	9	–	7	.563	21	–	10	.677
Missouri	8	–	8	.500	22	–	10	.688
Tennessee	8	–	8	.500	22	–	14	.611
Auburn	8	–	8	.500	20	–	13	.606
Arkansas	7	–	9	.438	12	–	18	.400
Vanderbilt	5	–	11	.313	18	–	14	.563
Alabama	4	–	12	.250	15	–	16	.484
LSU	3	–	13	.188	10	–	21	.323
Ole Miss	2	–	14	.125	10	–	20	.333
† 2016 SEC tournament winner As of March 27, 2016; Rankings from AP poll

The 2015–16 Tennessee Lady Volunteers basketball team represented the University of Tennessee in the 2015–16 college basketball season. The Lady Vols, led by 4th year head coach Holly Warlick, played their games at Thompson–Boling Arena and were members of the Southeastern Conference.

In the February 21 game against LSU, Diamond DeShields scored her 1,000th point. She is the sixth Lady Vol to score 1,000 in her second season and the 43rd to record 1,000 in her career.

Despite having a lackluster performance during the season that dropped them out of the national top-25 ranks in the latter half, Tennessee made it to the semifinals of the SEC Tournament. There, they lost to Mississippi State, 58–48. The Lady Vols also received an at-large invitation to the NCAA Tournament, and advanced to the Elite Eight, before losing 89–67 to Syracuse.

== Roster ==
2015–16 Tennessee Lady Volunteers women's basketball team
Players
Coaches

Pos.	#	Name	Height	Year	Previous school	Hometown
G	0	Jordan Reynolds	5 ft 11 in (1.8 m)	So	Central Catholic HS	Portland, OR
C	1	Nia Moore	6 ft 3 in (1.91 m)	Sr	Bolingbrook HS	Chicago, IL
F	2	Jasmine Jones (injured)	6 ft 2 in (1.88 m)	RS Jr	Bob Jones HS	Madison, AL
G	10	Meme Jackson	5 ft 11 in (1.8 m)	Fr	Blackman HS	Murfreesboro, TN
G	11	Diamond DeShields	6 ft 1 in (1.85 m)	RS So	Norcross HS; North Carolina	Norcross, GA
F	12	Bashaara Graves	6 ft 2 in (1.88 m)	Sr	Clarksville HS	Clarksville, TN
G/F	13	Kortney Dunbar	6 ft 2 in (1.88 m)	So	Edwardsville HS	Edwardsville, IL
G	14	Andraya Carter	5 ft 9 in (1.75 m)	RS Jr	Buford HS	Flowery Branch, GA
G	20	Te'a Cooper	5 ft 8 in (1.73 m)	Fr	McEachern HS	Powder Springs, GA
C	21	Mercedes Russell	6 ft 6 in (1.98 m)	RS So	Springfield HS	Springfield, OR
G/F	31	Jaime Nared	6 ft 2 in (1.88 m)	So	Westview HS	Portland, OR
G	33	Alexa Middleton	5 ft 9 in (1.75 m)	So	Riverdale HS	Murfreesboro, TN

Head coach

Holly Warlick (Tennessee)

Assistant coach(es)

Kyra Elzy (Tennessee)
Jolette Law (Iowa)
Dean Lockwood (Army)

Legend

- (C) Team captain
- (S) Suspended
- (I) Ineligible
- (W) Walk-on
- Injured
- Current redshirt

Roster

== Rankings ==
Ranking movement Legend: ██ Increase in ranking. ██ Decrease in ranking. ██ Not ranked the previous week. RV=Received votes.
Poll	Pre- Season	Week 2	Week 3	Week 4	Week 5	Week 6	Week 7	Week 8	Week 9	Week 10	Week 11	Week 12	Week 13	Week 14	Week 15	Week 16	Week 17	Week 18	Week 19	Final
AP	4	4	4	8	16	14	14	13	12	13	18	19	23	25	24	RV	NR	RV	RV	N/A
Coaches	4	5	5	8	15	16	16	16	11	15	22	23	25	RV	RV	NR	NR	NR	NR	19

== Schedule and results ==
Date time, TV	Rank^{#}	Opponent^{#}	Result	Record	High points	High rebounds	High assists	Site (attendance) city, state
Exhibition
11/09/2015*; 7:00 pm	No. 4	Carson–Newman	W 101–59		23 – Russell	10 – Russell	7 – Reynolds	Thompson–Boling Arena (9,218); Knoxville, TN
Regular season
11/15/2015*; 2:00 pm	No. 4	Central Arkansas	W 102–47	1–0	24 – Dunbar	13 – Tied	6 – Tied	Thompson–Boling Arena (9,709); Knoxville, TN
11/18/2015*; 8:00 pm, SECN	No. 4	Penn State	W 74–66	2–0	24 – Graves	13 – Tied	5 – Reynolds	Thompson–Boling Arena (8,858); Knoxville, TN
11/20/2015*; 7:00 pm	No. 4	No. 25 Syracuse	W 57–55	3–0	16 – Graves	10 – Graves	4 – Cooper	Thompson–Boling Arena (10,007); Knoxville, TN
11/23/2015*; 7:00 pm	No. 4	Chattanooga	W 59–57	4–0	17 – DeShields	11 – Graves	4 – Cooper	Thompson–Boling Arena (9,449); Knoxville, TN
11/27/2015*; 12:00 pm	No. 4	Albany	W 63–55	5–0	12 – Russell	7 – Tied	4 – Tied	Thompson–Boling Arena (9,806); Knoxville, TN
11/29/2015*; 2:30 pm, ESPN	No. 4	No. 8 Texas	L 53–64	5–1	24 – DeShields	11 – Tied	5 – Carter	Thompson–Boling Arena (10,204); Knoxville, TN
12/02/2015*; 7:00 pm	No. 8	East Tennessee State	W 85–49	6–1	31 – DeShields	10 – Russell	5 – Tied	Thompson–Boling Arena (9,328); Knoxville, TN
12/06/2015*; 2:00 pm, SECN	No. 8	Virginia Tech	L 43–57	6–2	15 – DeShields	15 – Russell	3 – Cooper	Thompson–Boling Arena (9,431); Knoxville, TN
12/11/2015*; 8:05 pm, ESPN3	No. 16	at Wichita State	W 58–51	7–2	18 – Graves	13 – Graves	4 – DeShields	Charles Koch Arena (2,424); Wichita, KS
12/16/2015*; 9:00 pm, ESPNU	No. 14	at No. 15 Stanford; Rivalry	L 55–69	7–3	12 – Tied	8 – Russell	3 – Graves	Maples Pavilion (3,768); Stanford, CA
12/19/2015*; 9:00 pm, P12N	No. 14	at No. 7 Oregon State	W 53–50	8–3	14 – DeShields	9 – DeShields	2 – 4 Tied	Gill Coliseum (8,223); Corvallis, OR
12/30/2015*; 7:00 pm	No. 13	Stetson	W 90–56	9–3	30 – DeShields	8 – Russell	6 – Cooper	Thompson–Boling Arena (10,705); Knoxville, TN
01/04/2016; 7:00 pm, SECN	No. 12	at No. 20 Missouri	W 71–54	10–3 (1–0)	13 – Nared	9 – DeShields	4 – Graves	Mizzou Arena (7,989); Columbia, MO
01/07/2016; 7:30 pm, SECN	No. 12	Florida	L 66–74	10–4 (1–1)	16 – DeShields	19 – Graves	2 – Tied	Thompson–Boling Arena (9,774); Knoxville, TN
01/10/2016; 2:00 pm, ESPNU	No. 12	Auburn	W 79–52	11–4 (2–1)	25 – DeShields	10 – Russell	7 – DeShields	Thompson–Boling Arena (11,539); Knoxville, TN
01/14/2016; 9:00 pm, SECN	No. 13	at Arkansas	L 59–64	11–5 (2–2)	14 – DeShields	11 – Russell	3 – Reynolds	Bud Walton Arena (1,644); Fayetteville, AR
01/18/2016*; 7:00 pm, ESPN2	No. 18	at No. 3 Notre Dame	L 66–79	11–6	17 – DeShields	10 – Graves	7 – Reynolds	Edmund P. Joyce Center (8,961); South Bend, IN
01/21/2016; 7:00 pm, SECN	No. 18	Vanderbilt; Rivalry	W 58–49	12–6 (3–2)	13 – Cooper	6 – Graves	4 – Tied	Thompson–Boling Arena (11,159); Knoxville, TN
01/25/2016; 7:00 pm, ESPN2	No. 19	at No. 12 Kentucky; Rivalry	L 63–64	12–7 (3–3)	13 – DeShields	12 – Graves	3 – Cooper	Memorial Coliseum (6,188); Lexington, KY
01/28/2016; 9:00 pm, SECN	No. 19	at No. 13 Mississippi State	L 63–65 ^{OT}	12–8 (3–4)	15 – Reynolds	11 – Reynolds	3 – Reynolds	Humphrey Coliseum (5,710); Starkville, MS
01/31/2016; 3:00 pm, SECN	No. 19	Alabama	W 70–42	13–8 (4–4)	17 – Tied	13 – Russell	5 – Reynolds	Thompson–Boling Arena (12,613); Knoxville, TN
02/04/2016; 7:00 pm	No. 23	Arkansas	W 75–57	14–8 (5–4)	15 – Tied	11 – Russell	6 – Reynolds	Thompson–Boling Arena (9,414); Knoxville, TN
02/07/2016; 4:00 pm, ESPN	No. 23	at No. 12 Texas A&M	L 71–76 ^{OT}	14–9 (5–5)	16 – Reynolds	9 – Russell	4 – Carter	Reed Arena (4,791); College Station, TX
02/11/2016; 9:00 pm, SECN	No. 25	at Vanderbilt; Rivalry	W 69–51	15–9 (6–5)	18 – Nared	9 – DeShields	4 – Nared	Memorial Gymnasium (4,980); Nashville, TN
02/15/2016; 7:00 pm, ESPN2	No. 24	No. 3 South Carolina	L 56–62	15–10 (6–6)	21 – DeShields	10 – Graves	2 – Tied	Thompson–Boling Arena (12,014); Knoxville, TN
02/18/2016; 7:00 pm	No. 24	Ole Miss	W 57–51	16–10 (7–6)	15 – Graves	12 – Graves	5 – Cooper	Thompson–Boling Arena (10,548); Knoxville, TN
02/21/2016; 2:00 pm, ESPNU	No. 24	at LSU	L 56–57	16–11 (7–7)	19 – DeShields	8 – Graves	3 – Middleton	Maravich Center (3,132); Baton Rouge, LA
02/25/2016; 8:30 pm, SECN		at Alabama	L 46–54	16–12 (7–8)	15 – Graves	11 – Russell	2 – Reynolds	Foster Auditorium (2,767); Tuscaloosa, AL
02/28/2016; 1:00 pm, ESPN2		Georgia	W 80–60	17–12 (8–8)	22 – DeShields	10 – Graves	5 – Reynolds	Thompson–Boling Arena (12,446); Knoxville, TN
2016 SEC Tournament
03/03/2016; 6:00 pm, SECN		vs. Arkansas; Second Round	W 68–51	18–12	15 – DeShields	8 – Reynolds	4 – Tied	Jacksonville Veterans Memorial Arena (3,094); Jacksonville, FL
03/04/2016; 6:00 pm, SECN		vs. No. 15 Texas A&M; Quarterfinals	W 70–60	19–12	21 – DeShields	7 – Graves	4 – DeShields	Jacksonville Veterans Memorial Arena (4,214); Jacksonville, FL
03/05/2016; 6:00 pm, ESPNU		vs. No. 16 Mississippi State; Semifinals	L 48–58	19–13	22 – DeShields	15 – Graves	2 – Tied	Jacksonville Veterans Memorial Arena (5,632); Jacksonville, FL
NCAA Women's Tournament
03/18/2016*; 5:00 pm, ESPN2	(7 SF)	vs. (10 SF) Green Bay; First Round	W 59–53	20–13	15 – Cooper	14 – Russell	4 – Reynolds	Wells Fargo Arena (2,842); Tempe, AZ
03/20/2016*; 9:00 pm, ESPN	(7 SF)	vs. (2 SF) No. 11 Arizona State; Second Round	W 75–64	21–13	24 – DeShields	11 – Graves	3 – Russell	Wells Fargo Arena (2,957); Tempe, AZ
03/25/2016*; 9:30 pm, ESPN2	(7 SF)	vs. (3 SF) No. 9 Ohio State; Sweet Sixteen	W 78–62	22–13	25 – Russell	15 – Russell	7 – DeShields	Denny Sanford Premier Center (4,610); Sioux Falls, SD
03/27/2016*; 3:30 pm, ESPN	(7 SF)	vs. (4 SF) No. 14 Syracuse; Elite Eight	L 67–89	22–14	20 – DeShields	10 – DeShields	6 – Nared	Denny Sanford Premier Center (4,055); Sioux Falls, SD
*Non-conference game. ^{#}Rankings from AP Poll. (#) Tournament seedings in parentheses. SF=Sioux Falls Region. All times are in Eastern Time.

== See also ==
- 2015–16 Tennessee Volunteers basketball team
