= 2015–16 Mississippi State Bulldogs women's basketball team =

Intercollegiate basketball season

2015–16 Mississippi State Bulldogs women's basketball

Puerto Rico Classic champions

NCAA tournament, Sweet Sixteen
- Conference: Southeastern Conference

Ranking
- Coaches: No. 18
- AP: No. 15
- Record: 28–8 (11–5 SEC)
- Head coach: Vic Schaefer (4th season)
- Assistant coaches: Johnnie Harris; Dionnah Jackson; Elena Lovato
- Home arena: Humphrey Coliseum

2015–16 SEC women's basketball standings
	Conf.				Overall
Team	W		L	PCT	W		L	PCT
No. 3 South Carolina †	16	–	0	1.000	33	–	2	.943
No. 15 Mississippi State	11	–	5	.688	28	–	8	.778
No. 18 Texas A&M	11	–	5	.688	22	–	10	.688
No. 12 Kentucky	10	–	6	.625	25	–	8	.758
No. 25 Florida	10	–	6	.625	22	–	9	.710
Georgia	9	–	7	.563	21	–	10	.677
Missouri	8	–	8	.500	22	–	10	.688
Tennessee	8	–	8	.500	22	–	14	.611
Auburn	8	–	8	.500	20	–	13	.606
Arkansas	7	–	9	.438	12	–	18	.400
Vanderbilt	5	–	11	.313	18	–	14	.563
Alabama	4	–	12	.250	15	–	16	.484
LSU	3	–	13	.188	10	–	21	.323
Ole Miss	2	–	14	.125	10	–	20	.333
† 2016 SEC tournament winner As of March 27, 2016; Rankings from AP poll

The 2015–16 Mississippi State Bulldogs women's basketball team represented Mississippi State University during the 2015–16 NCAA Division I women's basketball season. The Bulldogs were led by fourth year head coach Vic Schaefer. They played their home games at Humphrey Coliseum and were members of the Southeastern Conference. They finished the season 28–8, 11–5 in SEC play to finish in a tie for second place. They advanced to the championship game of the SEC women's tournament, where they lost to South Carolina. They received an at-large bid to the NCAA women's tournament, where they defeated Chattanooga and Michigan State in the first and second rounds before getting dismantled by Connecticut by 60 points in the sweet sixteen, the largest defeat in Bulldogs women's basketball history.

== Roster ==
2015–16 Mississippi State Bulldogs women's basketball team
Players
Coaches

Pos.	#	Name	Height	Year	Previous school	Hometown
G	00	Dominique Dillingham	5 ft 9 in (1.75 m)	Jr	Klein Collins HS	Spring, TX
G	1	Blair Schaefer	5 ft 7 in (1.7 m)	So	Starkville HS	Starkville, MS
G	2	Morgan William	5 ft 5 in (1.65 m)	So	Shades Valley HS	Birmingham, AL
F	3	Breanna Richardson	6 ft 1 in (1.85 m)	Jr	Rockdale County HS	Conyers, GA
F	5	Sherise Williams	6 ft 1 in (1.85 m)	Sr	McCluer HS	St. Louis, MO
G	10	Jazzmun Holmes	5 ft 8 in (1.73 m)	Fr	Harrison Central HS	Gulfport, MS
G	11	Roshunda Johnson (redshirt)	5 ft 7 in (1.7 m)	Jr	Parkview Arts & Science	Little Rock, AR
G	12	Jazmine Spears	6 ft 0 in (1.83 m)	Jr	Trinity Valley CC	New Albany, MS
F	13	Ketara Chapel	6 ft 1 in (1.85 m)	Jr	Temple HS	Temple, TX
C	15	Teaira McCowan	6 ft 7 in (2.01 m)	Fr	Brenham HS	Brenham, TX
G	23	Kayla Nevitt	5 ft 10 in (1.78 m)	So	Andy Dekaney HS	Houston, TX
C	25	Zion Campbell	6 ft 3 in (1.91 m)	Fr	Riverdale Baptist School	Washington, DC
F	35	Victoria Vivians	6 ft 1 in (1.85 m)	So	Scott Central HS	Forest, MS
F	44	LaKaris Salter	6 ft 1 in (1.85 m)	So	FAMU DRS	Tallahassee, FL
C	45	Chinwe Okorie	6 ft 5 in (1.96 m)	Jr	Stoneleigh-Burnham Prep	Lagos, Nigeria

Head coach

- Vic Schaefer (Texas A&M)

Assistant coach(es)

- Johnnie Harris (Arkansas Baptist)
- Dionnah Jackson (Oklahoma)
- Elena Lovato (Pittsburg State)

Legend

- (C) Team captain
- (S) Suspended
- (I) Ineligible
- (W) Walk-on
- Injured
- Current redshirt

Roster

== Schedule ==
Date time, TV	Rank^{#}	Opponent^{#}	Result	Record	Site (attendance) city, state
Exhibition
11/10/2015*; 7:00 pm	No. 11	Mississippi College	W 128–34		Humphrey Coliseum; Starkville, MS
Non-conference regular season
11/13/2015*; 5:15 pm	No. 11	Samford	W 68–47	1–0	Humphrey Coliseum (6,463); Starkville, MS
11/21/2015*; 1:00 pm	No. 10	Grambling State	W 107–43	2–0	Humphrey Coliseum (3,472); Starkville, MS
11/24/2015*; 7:00 pm	No. 8	Mississippi Valley State	W 109–37	3–0	Humphrey Coliseum (3,566); Starkville, MS
11/27/2015*; 6:00 pm	No. 8	Norfolk State	W 92–34	4–0	Humphrey Coliseum (3,894); Starkville, MS
11/29/2015*; 2:00 pm	No. 8	Savannah State	W 92–25	5–0	Humphrey Coliseum (3,672); Starkville, MS
12/02/2015*; 7:00 pm, LHN	No. 9	at No. 6 Texas	L 47–53	5–1	Frank Erwin Center (2,887); Austin, TX
12/06/2015*; 2:00 pm	No. 9	Tennessee State	W 82–54	6–1	Humphrey Coliseum (3,828); Starkville, MS
12/13/2015*; 3:00 pm	No. 9	at Louisiana Tech	W 93–63	7–1	Thomas Assembly Center (3,513); Ruston, LA
12/16/2015*; 7:00 pm	No. 9	Southern Miss	W 78–65	8–1	Humphrey Coliseum (3,505); Starkville, MS
12/19/2015*; 10:00 am	No. 9	vs. Florida Gulf Coast; Puerto Rico Classic	W 65–60	9–1	Coliseo Rubén Zayas Montañez; Trujillo Alto, PR
12/20/2015*; 12:15 pm	No. 9	vs. Western Michigan; Puerto Rico Classic	W 90–68	10–1	Coliseo Rubén Zayas Montañez (370); Trujillo Alto, PR
12/21/2015*; 12:15 pm	No. 8	vs. SMU; Puerto Rico Classic	W 72–70	11–1	Coliseo Rubén Zayas Montañez; Trujillo Alto, PR
12/28/2015*; 7:00 pm	No. 8	Southeastern Louisiana	W 81–41	12–1	Humphrey Coliseum (3,419); Starkville, MS
12/30/2015*; 3:30 pm, SECN	No. 8	vs. No. 20 South Florida; SEC/AAC Challenge	W 68–58	13–1	Jacksonville Veterans Memorial Arena; Jacksonville, FL
SEC regular season
01/03/2016; 12:00 pm, SECN	No. 8	at Florida	W 76–70	14–1 (1–0)	O'Connell Center (1,378); Gainesville, FL
01/07/2016; 7:30 pm, SECN	No. 7	Auburn	W 60–45	15–1 (2–0)	Humphrey Coliseum (4,610); Starkville, MS
01/10/2016; 2:00 pm	No. 7	Arkansas	W 80–55	16–1 (3–0)	Humphrey Coliseum (5,712); Starkville, MS
01/14/2016; 7:00 pm	No. 7	at No. 24 Missouri	L 54–66	16–2 (3–1)	Mizzou Arena (3,461); Columbia, MO
01/18/2016; 6:00 pm, SECN	No. 10	Ole Miss	W 79–51	17–2 (4–1)	Humphrey Coliseum (7,128); Starkville, MS
01/21/2016; 6:00 pm	No. 10	at Georgia	L 43–47	17–3 (4–2)	Stegeman Coliseum (1,920); Athens, GA
01/24/2016; 4:00 pm, ESPN2	No. 10	No. 2 South Carolina	L 51–57	17–4 (4–3)	Humphrey Coliseum (10,626); Starkville, MS
01/28/2016; 8:00 pm, SECN	No. 13	No. 19 Tennessee	W 65–63 ^{OT}	18–4 (5–3)	Humphrey Coliseum (5,710); Starkville, MS
01/31/2016; 2:00 pm	No. 13	at Arkansas	W 65–55	19–4 (6–3)	Bud Walton Arena (5,273); Fayetteville, AR
02/04/2016; 8:00 pm, SECN	No. 11	at LSU	W 71–52	20–4 (7–3)	Maravich Center (2,194); Baton Rouge, LA
02/07/2016; 2:00 pm	No. 11	No. 21 Missouri	W 52–42	21–4 (8–3)	Humphrey Coliseum (4,521); Starkville, MS
02/11/2016; 6:00 pm, SECN	No. 11	at No. 15 Texas A&M	L 58–64	21–5 (8–4)	Reed Arena (5,645); College Station, TX
02/18/2016; 6:00 pm, SECN	No. 14	No. 16 Kentucky	L 60–83	21–6 (8–5)	Humphrey Coliseum (4,355); Starkville, MS
02/21/2016; 4:00 pm, ESPN2	No. 14	at Ole Miss	W 60–51	22–6 (9–5)	The Pavilion at Ole Miss (4,411); Oxford, MS
02/25/2016; 7:00 pm, SECN	No. 16	at Vanderbilt	W 66–61	23–6 (10–5)	Memorial Gymnasium (2,466); Nashville, TN
02/28/2016; 2:00 pm	No. 16	Alabama	W 61–52	24–6 (11–5)	Humphrey Coliseum (6,224); Starkville, MS
SEC Women's Tournament
03/04/2016; 7:30 pm, SECN	(3) No. 16	vs. (11) Vanderbilt; Quarterfinals	W 63–46	25–6	Jacksonville Veterans Memorial Arena (4,214); Jacksonville, FL
03/05/2016; 6:30 pm, ESPNU	(3) No. 16	vs. (7) Tennessee; Semifinals	W 58–48	26–6	Jacksonville Veterans Memorial Arena (5,632); Jacksonville, FL
03/06/2016; 1:30 pm, ESPN	(3) No. 16	vs. (1) No. 3 South Carolina; Championship Game	L 52–66	26–7	Jacksonville Veterans Memorial Arena (6,549); Jacksonville, FL
NCAA Women's Tournament
03/18/2016*; 1:30 pm, ESPN2	(5 B) No. 15	(12 B) Chattanooga; First Round	W 60–50	27–7	Humphrey Coliseum (5,115); Starkville, MS
03/20/2016*; 1:30 pm, ESPN2	(5 B) No. 15	vs. (4 B) No. 16 Michigan State; Second Round	W 74–72	28–7	Humphrey Coliseum (7,094); Starkville, MS
03/26/2016*; 10:30 am, ESPN	(5 B) No. 15	vs. (1 B) No. 1 Connecticut; Sweet Sixteen	L 38–98	28–8	Webster Bank Arena (8,898); Bridgeport, CT
*Non-conference game. ^{#}Rankings from AP Poll. (#) Tournament seedings in parentheses. B=Bridgeport Region. All times are in Central Time.

== Rankings ==
Regular season polls
Poll	Pre- Season	Week 2	Week 3	Week 4	Week 5	Week 6	Week 7	Week 8	Week 9	Week 10	Week 11	Week 12	Week 13	Week 14	Week 15	Week 16	Week 17	Week 18	Week 19	Final
AP	11	10	8т	9	9	9	8	8	7	7	10	13	11	11	14	16	16	15	15	N/A
Coaches	13	11	10	9	10	9	8	8	6	6	10	13	12	11	13	16	14	14	14	18

Legend
	Increase in ranking
	Decrease in ranking
	Not ranked previous week
(RV)	Received Votes

== See also ==
- 2015–16 Mississippi State Bulldogs men's basketball team
