= 2015–16 Vanderbilt Commodores women's basketball team =

Intercollegiate basketball season

2015–16 Vanderbilt Commodores women's basketball

Vanderbilt Thanksgiving Tournament Champions Fordham Holiday Classic Champions
- Conference: Southeastern Conference
- Record: 18–14 (5–11 SEC)
- Head coach: Melanie Balcomb (14th season)
- Assistant coaches: Kim Rosamond; Ashley Earley; Wendale Farrow
- Home arena: Memorial Gymnasium

2015–16 SEC women's basketball standings
	Conf.				Overall
Team	W		L	PCT	W		L	PCT
No. 3 South Carolina †	16	–	0	1.000	33	–	2	.943
No. 15 Mississippi State	11	–	5	.688	28	–	8	.778
No. 18 Texas A&M	11	–	5	.688	22	–	10	.688
No. 12 Kentucky	10	–	6	.625	25	–	8	.758
No. 25 Florida	10	–	6	.625	22	–	9	.710
Georgia	9	–	7	.563	21	–	10	.677
Missouri	8	–	8	.500	22	–	10	.688
Tennessee	8	–	8	.500	22	–	14	.611
Auburn	8	–	8	.500	20	–	13	.606
Arkansas	7	–	9	.438	12	–	18	.400
Vanderbilt	5	–	11	.313	18	–	14	.563
Alabama	4	–	12	.250	15	–	16	.484
LSU	3	–	13	.188	10	–	21	.323
Ole Miss	2	–	14	.125	10	–	20	.333
† 2016 SEC tournament winner As of March 27, 2016; Rankings from AP poll

The 2015–16 Vanderbilt Commodores women's basketball team represented Vanderbilt University in the 2015–16 college basketball season. The team's head coach was Melanie Balcomb, in her fourteenth season at Vanderbilt. The team played their home games at Memorial Gymnasium in Nashville, Tennessee, as a member of the Southeastern Conference. They finished the season 18–14, 5–11 in SEC play to finish in eleventh place. They advanced to the quarterfinals of the SEC women's tournament, where they lost to Mississippi State.

On April 27, it was announced that Balcomb had resigned her position. She finished at Vanderbilt with a 14-year record of 310–149.

== Roster ==
2015–16 Vanderbilt Commodores women's basketball team
Players
Coaches

Pos.	#	Name	Height	Year	Previous school	Hometown
G	1	Rebekah Dahlman	5 ft 9 in (1.75 m)	RS So	Braham Area	Braham, MN
G	3	Rachel Bell	5 ft 10 in (1.78 m)	So	Creek Wood	Cumberland Furnace, TN
G	12	Myka Dancy	5 ft 9 in (1.75 m)	So	Antioch	Antioch, TN
G	15	Jasmine Jenkins	5 ft 8 in (1.73 m)	Sr	East Hall	Gainesville, GA
F	22	Marqu'es Webb	6 ft 1 in (1.85 m)	Jr	Hoover	Hoover, AL
G	23	Minta Spears	5 ft 10 in (1.78 m)	RS Jr	Bullard; Texas Tech	Bullard, TX
F	24	Kristen Gaffney	6 ft 1 in (1.85 m)	RS Jr	Green Hope	Cary, NC
G	25	Morgan Batey	5 ft 10 in (1.78 m)	Sr	Pace Academy	Atlanta, GA
G	33	Christa Reed	5 ft 11 in (1.8 m)	So	Bay	Bay St. Louis, MS
C	35	Kendall Shaw	6 ft 4 in (1.93 m)	RS Jr	Barbers Hill	Mont Belvieu, TX
F	44	Rayte'a Long	6 ft 0 in (1.83 m)	Jr	Chaminade	Dayton, OH

Head coach

- Melanie Balcomb (TCNJ)

Assistant coach(es)

- Kim Rosamond (Mississippi)
- Ashley Earley (Vanderbilt)
- Wendale Farrow (Eastern Michigan)

Legend

- (C) Team captain
- (S) Suspended
- (I) Ineligible
- (W) Walk-on
- Injured
- Current redshirt

Roster

== Schedule ==
Date time, TV	Rank^{#}	Opponent^{#}	Result	Record	Site (attendance) city, state
Exhibition
11/07/2015*; 3:00 pm		Clayton State	W 96–32		Memorial Gymnasium; Nashville, TN
Non-conference regular season
11/15/2015*; 2:00 pm		Mississippi Valley State	W 89–39	1–0	Memorial Gymnasium (2,264); Nashville, TN
11/18/2015*; 6:00 pm		at Dayton	L 56–81	1–1	UD Arena (1,637); Dayton, OH
11/21/2015*; 1:00 pm, ESPN3		at Green Bay	L 56–58	1–2	Kress Events Center (2,351); Green Bay, WI
11/23/2015*; 11:30 am		Presbyterian	W 56–38	2–2	Memorial Gymnasium (5,351); Nashville, TN
11/27/2015*; 12:00 pm		Austin Peay; Thanksgiving Tournament semifinals	W 73–56	3–2	Memorial Gymnasium (2,447); Nashville, TN
11/28/2015*; 2:30 pm		Ohio; Thanksgiving Tournament championship	W 62–59	4–2	Memorial Gymnasium (2,462); Nashville, TN
11/30/2015*; 8:00 pm, SECN		Air Force	W 86–29	5–2	Memorial Gymnasium (2,213); Nashville, TN
12/03/2015*; 6:00 pm		at Drexel	W 74–64	6–2	Daskalakis Athletic Center (539); Philadelphia, PA
12/05/2015*; 1:00 pm		East Tennessee State	W 65–39	7–2	Memorial Gymnasium (2,264); Nashville, TN
12/10/2015*; 7:00 pm		Troy	W 97–43	8–2	Memorial Gymnasium (2,528); Nashville, TN
12/21/2015*; 12:00 pm		Tennessee–Martin	W 64–61	9–2	Memorial Gymnasium (2,574); Nashville, TN
12/29/2015*; 3:00 pm		vs. New Mexico State; Fordham Holiday Classic semifinals	W 71–45	10–2	Rose Hill Gymnasium (832); Bronx, NY
12/30/2015*; 2:30 pm		at Fordham; Fordham Holiday Classic championship	W 53–40	11–2	Rose Hill Gymnasium (622); Bronx, NY
SEC regular season
01/03/2016; 2:00 pm		at Ole Miss	L 52–55	11–3 (0–1)	Tad Smith Coliseum (1,283); Oxford, MS
01/07/2016; 7:00 pm, SECN		No. 2 South Carolina	L 61–71	11–4 (0–2)	Memorial Gymnasium (2,547); Nashville, TN
01/10/2016; 2:00 pm		at Alabama	W 54–48	12–4 (1–2)	Foster Auditorium (3,023); Tuscaloosa, AL
01/14/2016; 7:00 pm		LSU	W 58–42	13–4 (2–2)	Memorial Gymnasium (2,332); Nashville, TN
01/21/2016; 6:00 pm, SECN		at No. 18 Tennessee; Rivalry	L 49–58	13–5 (2–3)	Thompson–Boling Arena (11,159); Knoxville, TN
01/25/2016; 6:00 pm, SECN		Alabama	W 67–52	14–5 (3–3)	Memorial Gymnasium (2,961); Nashville, TN
01/28/2016; 6:00 pm		at No. 12 Kentucky	W 71–69	15–5 (4–3)	Memorial Coliseum (5,193); Lexington, KY
01/31/2016; 2:00 pm		Georgia	L 58–64	15–6 (4–4)	Memorial Gymnasium (3,111); Nashville, TN
02/04/2016; 6:00 pm		at Auburn	L 45–53	15–7 (4–5)	Auburn Arena (2,176); Auburn, AL
02/08/2016; 6:00 pm		at Arkansas	L 56–57	15–8 (4–6)	Bud Walton Arena (1,946); Fayetteville, AR
02/11/2016; 8:00 pm, SECN		No. 25 Tennessee; Rivalry	L 51–69	15–9 (4–7)	Memorial Gymnasium (4,980); Nashville, TN
02/14/2016; 3:00 pm, SECN		No. 18 Kentucky	L 55–71	15–10 (4–8)	Memorial Gymnasium; Nashville, TN
02/18/2016; 6:00 pm		at No. 22 Florida	L 67–79	15–11 (4–9)	O'Connell Center (1,439); Gainesville, FL
02/21/2016; 4:00 pm, SECN		No. 12 Texas A&M	L 63–75	15–12 (4–10)	Memorial Gymnasium (2,975); Nashville, TN
02/25/2016; 7:00 pm, SECN		No. 16 Mississippi State	L 61–66	15–13 (4–11)	Memorial Gymnasium (2,466); Nashville, TN
02/28/2016; 1:00 pm, SECN		at No. 24 Missouri	W 56–52	16–13 (5–11)	Mizzou Arena (5,998); Columbia, MO
SEC Women's Tournament
03/02/2016; 12:30 pm, SECN		vs. Ole Miss; First Round	W 74–59	17–13	Jacksonville Veterans Memorial Arena; Jacksonville, FL
03/03/2016; 7:30 pm, SECN		vs. Georgia; Second Round	W 54–49 ^{OT}	18–13	Jacksonville Veterans Memorial Arena (3,094); Jacksonville, FL
03/04/2016; 7:30 pm, SECN		vs. No. 16 Mississippi State; Quarterfinals	L 46–63	18–14	Jacksonville Veterans Memorial Arena (4,214); Jacksonville, FL
*Non-conference game. ^{#}Rankings from AP Poll. (#) Tournament seedings in parentheses. All times are in Central Time.

== Rankings ==
Regular season polls
Poll	Pre- season	Week 2	Week 3	Week 4	Week 5	Week 6	Week 7	Week 8	Week 9	Week 10	Week 11	Week 12	Week 13	Week 14	Week 15	Week 16	Week 17	Week 18	Week 19	Final
AP	RV	NR	NR	NR	NR	NR	NR	NR	NR	NR	NR	NR	NR	NR	NR	NR	NR	NR	NR	N/A
Coaches	NR	NR	NR	NR	NR	NR	NR	NR	NR	NR	NR	NR	NR	NR	NR	NR	NR	NR	NR	NR

Legend
	Increase in ranking
	Decrease in ranking
	Not ranked previous week
(RV)	Received votes

== See also ==
- 2015–16 Vanderbilt Commodores men's basketball team
