= 2015–16 Florida Gators women's basketball team =

Intercollegiate basketball season

2015–16 Florida Gators women's basketball

Omni Hotels Classic champions

NCAA women's tournament, first round
- Conference: Southeastern Conference

Ranking
- AP: No. 25
- Record: 22–9 (10–6 SEC)
- Head coach: Amanda Butler (9th season)
- Assistant coaches: Bill Ferrara; Shimmy Gray-Miller; Murriel Page
- Home arena: O'Connell Center

2015–16 SEC women's basketball standings
	Conf.				Overall
Team	W		L	PCT	W		L	PCT
No. 3 South Carolina †	16	–	0	1.000	33	–	2	.943
No. 15 Mississippi State	11	–	5	.688	28	–	8	.778
No. 18 Texas A&M	11	–	5	.688	22	–	10	.688
No. 12 Kentucky	10	–	6	.625	25	–	8	.758
No. 25 Florida	10	–	6	.625	22	–	9	.710
Georgia	9	–	7	.563	21	–	10	.677
Missouri	8	–	8	.500	22	–	10	.688
Tennessee	8	–	8	.500	22	–	14	.611
Auburn	8	–	8	.500	20	–	13	.606
Arkansas	7	–	9	.438	12	–	18	.400
Vanderbilt	5	–	11	.313	18	–	14	.563
Alabama	4	–	12	.250	15	–	16	.484
LSU	3	–	13	.188	10	–	21	.323
Ole Miss	2	–	14	.125	10	–	20	.333
† 2016 SEC tournament winner As of March 27, 2016; Rankings from AP poll

The 2015–16 Florida Gators women's basketball team represented the University of Florida in basketball during the 2015–16 women's college basketball season. The Gators competed in Division I of the National Collegiate Athletic Association (NCAA) and the Southeastern Conference (SEC). They were led by ninth-year head coach Amanda Butler, and played their home games in the O'Connell Center on the university's Gainesville, Florida campus. They finished the season 22–9, 10–6 in SEC play to finish in a tie for fourth place. They lost in the quarterfinals of the SEC women's tournament to Kentucky. They received an at-large bid to the NCAA women's tournament, where they were upset by Albany in the first round.

== Previous season ==
The Gators finish the season 13–17, 5–11 in SEC play to finish in a tie for eleventh place. They lost to Auburn in the first round of the 2015 SEC women's basketball tournament.

== Roster ==
2015–16 Florida Gators women's basketball team
Players
Coaches

Pos.	#	Name	Height	Year	Hometown
G/F	1	Ronni Williams	6 ft 0 in (1.83 m)	Jr	Daytona Beach, Florida
G	2	Isis Young	5 ft 7 in (1.7 m)	RS Fr	Berlin, New Jersey
G	3	January Miller	5 ft 8 in (1.73 m)	Sr	Orlando, Florida
G	4	Carlie Needles	5 ft 6 in (1.68 m)	RS Sr	Highlands Ranch, Colorado
G	11	Dyandria Anderson	5 ft 10 in (1.78 m)	So	Viera, Florida
G	13	Cassie Peoples	5 ft 6 in (1.68 m)	RS Sr	San Antonio, Texas
C	15	Viktorija Dimaite	6 ft 4 in (1.93 m)	RS Sr	Panevėžys, Lithuania
G	20	Simone Westbrook	5 ft 8 in (1.73 m)	Jr	Chandler, Arizona
G/F	21	Eleanna Christinaki	5 ft 11 in (1.8 m)	Fr	Paralimni, Greece
F	23	Brooke Copeland	6 ft 2 in (1.88 m)	So	Cleveland, Tennessee
C	24	Tyshara Fleming	6 ft 4 in (1.93 m)	Jr	Virginia Beach, Virginia
G	32	Carla Batchelor	5 ft 10 in (1.78 m)	Sr	Germantown, Maryland
F	44	Haley Lorenzen	6 ft 3 in (1.91 m)	So	Iowa City, Iowa

Head coach

- Amanda Butler (9th year)

Assistant coach(es)

- Bill Ferrara (1st year)
- Shimmy Gray-Miller (1st year)
- Murriel Page (6th year)

Legend

- (C) Team captain
- (S) Suspended
- (I) Ineligible
- (W) Walk-on
- Injured
- Current redshirt

Roster
Last update: 2015-08-28

=== Coaches ===
Name	Position	College	Graduating year
Amanda Butler	Head coach	University of Florida	1995
Bill Ferrara	Assistant coach	University of Florida	2003
Shimmy Gray-Miller	Assistant coach	University of Michigan	2000
Murriel Page	Assistant coach	University of Florida	1998
Serena Wilson	Director of basketball operations	University of Florida	2008
Shellie Greenman	Program coordinator	Emory and Henry College	1988
Ryan Gensler	Video coordinator	Providence College	2011
Tyler Stuart	Strength & conditioning coordinator	Anderson University	2007
John "JB" Barrett	Athletic trainer	Mississippi State University	1997
Judy Traveis	Academic advisor	University of Florida	1993

== Schedule and results ==
Date time, TV	Rank^{#}	Opponent^{#}	Result	Record	Site (attendance) city, state
Non-conference regular season
November 13, 2015*; 7:00 p.m.		at Temple	L 91–97	0–1	Liacouras Center (1,453); Philadelphia, PA
November 16, 2015*; 5:30 p.m., SECN		No. 6 Florida State; Rivalry	W 82–72	1–1	O'Connell Center (2,009); Gainesville, FL
November 21, 2015*; 4:00 p.m.		Kennesaw State	W 84–57	2–1	O'Connell Center (1,129); Gainesville, FL
November 24, 2015*; 7:00 p.m.		Savannah State	W 99–34	3–1	O'Connell Center (1,062); Gainesville, FL
November 27, 2015*; 7:30 p.m.		vs. Ball State; Omni Hotels Classic semifinals	W 85–78	4–1	Coors Events Center (538); Boulder, CO
November 28, 2015*; 9:30 p.m.		at Colorado; Omni Hotels Classic championship	W 83–61	5–1	Coors Events Center (1,666); Boulder, CO
December 1, 2015*; 8:00 p.m.		at South Alabama	W 72–60	6–1	Mitchell Center (804); Mobile, AL
December 7, 2015*; 7:00 p.m.		Arkansas State	W 76–72	7–1	O'Connell Center (1,035); Gainesville, FL
December 10, 2015*; 8:00 p.m., BTN		at Wisconsin	W 91–75	8–1	Kohl Center (3,019); Madison, WI
December 13, 2015*; 2:00 p.m.		Robert Morris	W 79–52	9–1	O'Connell Center (1,017); Gainesville, FL
December 20, 2015*; 2:30 p.m.		Saint Francis (PA); Gator Holiday Classic semifinals	W 122–65	10–1	O'Connell Center (1,107); Gainesville, FL
December 21, 2015*; 2:30 p.m.		NC State; Gator Holiday Classic championship	W 79–72	11–1	O'Connell Center (1,053); Gainesville, FL
December 30, 2015*; 7:00 p.m., SECN		vs. UCF; SEC/AAC Challenge	W 93–79	12–1	Jacksonville Veterans Memorial Arena (2,044); Jacksonville, FL
SEC regular season
January 3, 2016; 1:00 p.m., SECN		No. 8 Mississippi State	L 70–76	12–2 (0–1)	O'Connell Center (1,378); Gainesville, FL
January 7, 2016; 7:30 p.m., SECN		at No. 12 Tennessee	W 74–66	13–2 (1–1)	Thompson–Boling Arena (9,774); Knoxville, TN
January 10, 2016; 2:00 p.m., SECN		at Ole Miss	W 85–65	14–2 (2–1)	The Pavilion at Ole Miss (2,468); Oxford, MS
January 14, 2016; 7:00 p.m.	No. 20	Georgia	L 61–71	14–3 (2–2)	O'Connell Center (1,912); Gainesville, FL
January 17, 2016; 7:00 p.m.	No. 20	LSU	W 53–45	15–3 (3–2)	O'Connell Center (1,819); Gainesville, FL
January 21, 2016; 7:00 p.m.	No. 22	Alabama	W 80–72	16–3 (4–2)	O'Connell Center (1,305); Gainesville, FL
January 24, 2016; 2:00 p.m., SECN	No. 22	at No. 23 Missouri	L 64–79	16–4 (4–3)	Mizzou Arena (5,941); Columbia, MO
January 28, 2016; 8:00 p.m.		at Arkansas	W 71–66 ^{OT}	17–4 (5–3)	Bud Walton Arena (1,576); Fayetteville, AR
January 31, 2016; 1:00 p.m., SECN		No. 12 Kentucky	W 85–79	18–4 (6–3)	O'Connell Center (3,231); Gainesville, FL
February 4, 2016; 7:00 p.m.	No. 22	No. 12 Texas A&M	W 83–81	19–4 (7–3)	O'Connell Center (1,404); Gainesville, FL
February 11, 2016; 7:00 p.m.	No. 16	at No. 2 South Carolina	L 71–86	19–5 (7–4)	Colonial Life Arena (13,324); Columbia, SC
February 14, 2016; 2:00 p.m., SECN	No. 16	at Auburn	L 58–80	19–6 (7–5)	Auburn Arena (2,760); Auburn, AL
February 18, 2016; 7:00 p.m.	No. 22	Vanderbilt	W 79–67	20–6 (8–5)	O'Connell Center (1,439); Gainesville, FL
February 21, 2016; 1:00 p.m., SECN	No. 22	at Georgia	L 63–74	20–7 (8–6)	Stegeman Coliseum (3,733); Athens, GA
February 25, 2016; 8:30 p.m., SECN		at LSU	W 82–56	21–7 (9–6)	Maravich Center (2,731); Baton Rouge, LA
February 28, 2016; 2:00 p.m.		Auburn	W 56–49	22–7 (10–6)	O'Connell Center (4,019); Gainesville, FL
SEC Women's Tournament
March 4, 2016; 2:30 pm, SECN	No. 25	vs. No. 13 Kentucky; Quarterfinals	L 69–92	22–8	Jacksonville Veterans Memorial Arena (4,703); Jacksonville, FL
NCAA Women's Tournament
March 18, 2016*; 12:00 pm, ESPN2	(SF 5) No. 25	vs. (SF 12) Albany; First Round	L 59–61	22–9	Carrier Dome (2,445); Syracuse, NY
*Non-conference game. ^{#}Rankings from AP Poll. (#) Tournament seedings in parentheses. SF=Sioux Falls Region. All times are in Eastern Time.

== Rankings ==
2015–16 NCAA Division I women's basketball rankings

Regular season polls
Poll	Pre- Season	Week 2	Week 3	Week 4	Week 5	Week 6	Week 7	Week 8	Week 9	Week 10	Week 11	Week 12	Week 13	Week 14	Week 15	Week 16	Week 17	Week 18	Week 19	Final
AP	NR	NR	RV	RV	RV	RV	RV	RV	RV	20	22	RV	22	16	22	RV	25	25	25	N/A
Coaches	NR	RV	NR	RV	RV	RV	RV	RV	RV	21	23	RV	22	19	25	RV	24	25	24	RV

Legend
	Increase in ranking
	Decrease in ranking
	Not ranked previous week
(RV)	Received Votes

== See also ==
- 2015–16 Florida Gators men's basketball team
