= 2015–16 Georgia Lady Bulldogs basketball team =

Intercollegiate basketball season

2015–16 Georgia Lady Bulldogs basketball

Radisson Chatsworth Thanksgiving Classic Champions

NCAA Women's Tournament, first round
- Conference: Southeastern Conference
- Record: 21–9 (9–7 SEC)
- Head coach: Joni Taylor (1st season)
- Assistant coaches: Karen Lange; Chelsea Newton; Robert Mosley
- Home arena: Stegeman Coliseum

2015–16 SEC women's basketball standings
	Conf.				Overall
Team	W		L	PCT	W		L	PCT
No. 3 South Carolina †	16	–	0	1.000	33	–	2	.943
No. 15 Mississippi State	11	–	5	.688	28	–	8	.778
No. 18 Texas A&M	11	–	5	.688	22	–	10	.688
No. 12 Kentucky	10	–	6	.625	25	–	8	.758
No. 25 Florida	10	–	6	.625	22	–	9	.710
Georgia	9	–	7	.563	21	–	10	.677
Missouri	8	–	8	.500	22	–	10	.688
Tennessee	8	–	8	.500	22	–	14	.611
Auburn	8	–	8	.500	20	–	13	.606
Arkansas	7	–	9	.438	12	–	18	.400
Vanderbilt	5	–	11	.313	18	–	14	.563
Alabama	4	–	12	.250	15	–	16	.484
LSU	3	–	13	.188	10	–	21	.323
Ole Miss	2	–	14	.125	10	–	20	.333
† 2016 SEC tournament winner As of March 27, 2016; Rankings from AP poll

The 2015–16 Georgia Lady Bulldogs women's basketball team represented University of Georgia in the 2015–16 college basketball season. The Lady Bulldogs, led by first year head coach Joni Taylor. The team played their home games at Stegeman Coliseum, and were a member of the Southeastern Conference. They finished the season 21–10, 9–7 in SEC play to finish in sixth place. They lost in the second round of the SEC women's tournament to Tennessee. They received an at-large bid to the NCAA women's tournament, where they lost in the first round to Indiana.

== Roster ==
2015–16 Georgia Bulldogs women's basketball team
Players
Coaches

Pos.	#	Name	Height	Year	Previous school	Hometown
G	1	Shanea Armbrister	6 ft 2 in (1.88 m)	Jr	South Broward HS; Darton College	Nassau, Bahamas
G	2	Terryuana Goodwin	5 ft 4 in (1.63 m)	RS Sr	LaGrange HS; Butler CC	Hogansville, GA
G	3	Tiaria Griffin	5 ft 7 in (1.7 m)	Jr	Hattiesburg HS	Monticello, MS
F	4	Caliya Robinson	6 ft 3 in (1.91 m)	Fr	McEachern HS	Marietta, GA
G	10	Hannahkohl Almire	5 ft 9 in (1.75 m)	Jr	Riverwood Charter School	Atlanta, GA
G/F	11	Pachis Roberts	5 ft 11 in (1.8 m)	RS Jr	McEachern HS; Syracuse	Powder Springs, Ga
G	12	Haley Clark	5 ft 9 in (1.75 m)	So	Edgewater HS	Orlando, FL
F	13	Merritt Hempe	6 ft 2 in (1.88 m)	Sr	Stafford HS	Fredericksburg, VA
G/F	20	Shacobia Barbee	5 ft 10 in (1.78 m)	Jr	Riverdale HS	Murfreesboro, TN
F	23	Halle Washington	6 ft 2 in (1.88 m)	So	Parkway HS	Bossier City, LA
G	24	Marjorie Butler	5 ft 8 in (1.73 m)	Sr	The Webb School	Knoxville, TN
G	25	Amber Skidgel	6 ft 0 in (1.83 m)	Fr	Archer HS	Bethlehem, GA
F	33	Mackenzie Engram	6 ft 2 in (1.88 m)	So	Hillgrove HS	Powder Springs, GA

Head coach

- Joni Taylor (Alabama)

Assistant coach(es)

- Karen Lange (Iowa)
- Chelsea Newton (Rutgers)
- Robert Mosley (Miles)

Legend

- (C) Team captain
- (S) Suspended
- (I) Ineligible
- (W) Walk-on
- Injured
- Current redshirt

Roster
Last update: 2015-08-31

== Schedule ==
Date time, TV	Rank^{#}	Opponent^{#}	Result	Record	Site (attendance) city, state
Non-conference regular season
11/15/2015*; 2:00 pm		Stetson	W 76–55	1–0	Stegeman Coliseum (3,530); Athens, GA
11/18/2015*; 7:30 pm		at No. 23 Michigan State	L 45–66	1–1	Breslin Center (5,117); East Lansing, MI
11/22/2015*; 4:00 pm, SECN		Georgia Tech	W 78–66	2–1	Stegeman Coliseum (4,441); Athens, GA
11/24/2015*; 7:00 pm		Georgia Southern	W 75–28	3–1	Stegeman Coliseum (1,900); Athens, GA
11/27/2015*; 8:00 pm		vs. BYU; Radisson Thanksgiving Classic semifinals	W 66–58	4–1	Matadome; Northridge, CA
11/28/2015*; 7:30 pm		at Cal State Northridge; Radisson Thanksgiving Classic championship	W 83–58	5–1	Matadome (498); Northridge, CA
12/02/2015*; 7:00 pm		Mercer	W 57–44	6–1	Stegeman Coliseum (1,653); Athens, GA
12/03/2015*; 7:00 pm		Kennesaw State	W 89–34	7–1	Stegeman Coliseum (1,622); Athens, GA
12/06/2015*; 2:00 pm		No. 22 Seton Hall	W 70–52	8–1	Stegeman Coliseum (3,013); Athens, GA
12/08/2015*; 11:00 am		Furman	W 77–39	9–1	Stegeman Coliseum (6,002); Athens, GA
12/20/2015*; 2:00 pm		at Wright State	W 63–57	10–1	Nutter Center (1,563); Dayton, OH
12/23/2015*; 1:00 pm		Cincinnati	W 60–42	11–1	Stegeman Coliseum (2,350); Athens, GA
12/28/2015*; 7:00 pm		Tennessee Tech	W 81–48	12–1	Stegeman Coliseum (2,608); Athens, GA
SEC regular season
01/03/2016; 5:00 pm, SECN		at No. 16 Texas A&M	L 62–73	12–2 (0–1)	Reed Arena (5,027); College Station, TX
01/07/2016; 7:00 pm		No. 20 Missouri	L 48–54	12–3 (0–2)	Stegeman Coliseum (1,935); Athens, GA
01/10/2016; 2:00 pm		No. 12 Kentucky	L 53–64	12–4 (0–3)	Stegeman Coliseum (2,681); Athens, GA
01/14/2016; 7:00 pm		at No. 20 Florida	W 71–61	13–4 (1–3)	O'Connell Center (1,912); Gainesville, FL
01/17/2016; 5:00 pm, SECN		at Alabama	L 50–64	13–5 (1–4)	Foster Auditorium (3,732); Tuscaloosa, AL
01/21/2016; 7:00 pm		No. 10 Mississippi State	W 47–43	14–5 (2–4)	Stegeman Coliseum (1,920); Athens, GA
01/24/2016; 2:00 pm		LSU	L 46–53	14–6 (2–5)	Stegeman Coliseum (3,538); Athens, GA
01/28/2016; 7:00 pm, SECN		Auburn	W 63–30	15–6 (3–5)	Stegeman Coliseum (1,961); Athens, GA
01/31/2016; 3:00 pm		at Vanderbilt	W 64–58	16–6 (4–5)	Memorial Gymnasium (3,111); Nashville, TN
02/04/2016; 8:00 pm		at No. 21 Missouri	W 65–50	17–6 (5–5)	Mizzou Arena (4,086); Columbia, MO
02/07/2016; 2:00 pm		Ole Miss	W 70–56	18–6 (6–5)	Stegeman Coliseum (3,826); Athens, GA
02/14/2016; 3:00 pm		at LSU	W 58–47	19–6 (7–5)	Maravich Center (3,781); Baton Rouge, LA
02/18/2016; 7:00 pm		at No. 3 South Carolina	L 51–61	19–7 (7–6)	Colonial Life Arena (16,186); Columbia, SC
02/21/2016; 1:00 pm, SECN		No. 22 Florida	W 74–63	20–7 (8–6)	Stegeman Coliseum (3,733); Athens, GA
02/25/2016; 7:00 pm, SECN		Arkansas	W 72–57	21–7 (9–6)	Stegeman Coliseum (3,131); Athens, GA
02/28/2016; 1:00 pm, ESPN2		at Tennessee	L 60–80	21–8 (9–7)	Thompson–Boling Arena (12,446); Knoxville, TN
SEC Women's Tournament
03/03/2016; 8:30 pm, SECN		vs. Vanderbilt; Second Round	L 49–54 ^{OT}	21–9	Jacksonville Veterans Memorial Coliseum (3,094); Jacksonville, FL
NCAA Women's Tournament
03/19/2016*; 9:00 pm, ESPN2	(8 L)	vs. (9 L) Indiana; First Round	L 58–62	22–10	Edmund P. Joyce Center (6,310); South Bend, IN
*Non-conference game. ^{#}Rankings from AP Poll. (#) Tournament seedings in parentheses. L=Lexington Region. All times are in Eastern Time.

== Rankings ==
2015–16 NCAA Division I women's basketball rankings

Regular season polls
Poll	Pre- Season	Week 2	Week 3	Week 4	Week 5	Week 6	Week 7	Week 8	Week 9	Week 10	Week 11	Week 12	Week 13	Week 14	Week 15	Week 16	Week 17	Week 18	Week 19	Final
AP	NR	NR	NR	NR	RV	RV	RV	RV	RV	NR	NR	NR	NR	RV	RV	RV	NR	NR	NR	N/A
Coaches	NR	NR	NR	NR	RV	RV	RV	RV	RV	RV	RV	NR	NR	NR	NR	RV	NR	NR	NR	RV

Legend
	Increase in ranking
	Decrease in ranking
	Not ranked previous week
(RV)	Received Votes

== See also ==
- 2015–16 Georgia Bulldogs basketball team
