= 2015–16 Arkansas Razorbacks women's basketball team =

Intercollegiate basketball season

2015–16 Arkansas Razorbacks women's basketball
- Conference: Southeastern Conference
- Record: 12–18 (7–9 SEC)
- Head coach: Jimmy Dykes (2nd season)
- Assistant coaches: Christy Smith; Tari Cummings; Tommy Deffebaugh
- Home arena: Bud Walton Arena

2015–16 SEC women's basketball standings
	Conf.				Overall
Team	W		L	PCT	W		L	PCT
No. 3 South Carolina †	16	–	0	1.000	33	–	2	.943
No. 15 Mississippi State	11	–	5	.688	28	–	8	.778
No. 18 Texas A&M	11	–	5	.688	22	–	10	.688
No. 12 Kentucky	10	–	6	.625	25	–	8	.758
No. 25 Florida	10	–	6	.625	22	–	9	.710
Georgia	9	–	7	.563	21	–	10	.677
Missouri	8	–	8	.500	22	–	10	.688
Tennessee	8	–	8	.500	22	–	14	.611
Auburn	8	–	8	.500	20	–	13	.606
Arkansas	7	–	9	.438	12	–	18	.400
Vanderbilt	5	–	11	.313	18	–	14	.563
Alabama	4	–	12	.250	15	–	16	.484
LSU	3	–	13	.188	10	–	21	.323
Ole Miss	2	–	14	.125	10	–	20	.333
† 2016 SEC tournament winner As of March 27, 2016; Rankings from AP poll

The 2015–16 Arkansas Razorbacks women's basketball team represented the University of Arkansas in the 2015–16 college basketball season. The Razorbacks, led by second-year head coach Jimmy Dykes, play their games at Bud Walton Arena and were members of the Southeastern Conference. They finished the season 12–18, 7–9 in SEC play to finish in tenth place. They lost in the second round of the SEC women's tournament to Tennessee.

== Roster ==
2015–16 Arkansas Razorbacks women's basketball team
Players
Coaches

Pos.	#	Name	Height	Year	Previous school	Hometown
F	00	Jessica Jackson	6 ft 3 in (1.91 m)	Jr	Jacksonville HS	Jacksonville, AR
G	3	Malica Monk	5 ft 5 in (1.65 m)	Fr	North Little Rock HS	North Little Rock, AR
G/F	4	Keiryn Swenson	6 ft 1 in (1.85 m)	Fr	Maize HS	Wichita, KS
G	12	Bruinna Freeman	5 ft 9 in (1.75 m)	Fr	Pelham HS	Pelham, GA
G	15	Kelsey Brooks	5 ft 9 in (1.75 m)	Jr	Olathe Northwest HS	Lenexa, KS
G	21	Devin Cosper	5 ft 10 in (1.78 m)	So	Field Kindley HS; Coffeyville CC	Coffeyville, KS
G/F	22	Bailey Zimmerman	6 ft 0 in (1.83 m)	Fr	Wonderview HS	Hattieville, KS
G	24	Jordan Danberry	5 ft 8 in (1.73 m)	Fr	Conway HS	Conway, AR
C	25	Tatiyana Smith	6 ft 3 in (1.91 m)	Jr	Plano East HS; Arkansas Baptist	Plano, TX
F	32	Khadijah West	6 ft 2 in (1.88 m)	Jr	Huntington HS	Shreveport, LA
F	33	Melissa Wolff	6 ft 0 in (1.83 m)	Sr	Cabot HS	Cabot, AR
C	35	Alecia Cooley	6 ft 4 in (1.93 m)	Jr	Township HS; State Fair CC	Evanston, IL

Head coach

- Jimmy Dykes (Arkansas)

Assistant coach(es)

- Christy Smith (Arkansas)
- Tari Cummings (Oklahoma State)
- Tommy Deffebaugh (Drury)

Legend

- (C) Team captain
- (S) Suspended
- (I) Ineligible
- (W) Walk-on
- Injured
- Current redshirt

Roster

== Schedule ==
Date time, TV	Rank^{#}	Opponent^{#}	Result	Record	Site (attendance) city, state
Exhibition
11/08/2015*; 2:00 pm		Missouri Southern	W 73–52		Bud Walton Arena (1,701); Fayetteville, AR
Non-conference regular season
11/13/2015*; 10:30 am		Southeastern Louisiana	W 97–53	1–0	Bud Walton Arena (4,937); Fayetteville, AR
11/15/2015*; 2:00 pm		Sam Houston State	W 67–47	2–0	Bud Walton Arena (1,612); Fayetteville, AR
11/18/2015*; 7:00 pm		at South Dakota State	L 69–76	2–1	Frost Arena (2,109); Brookings, SD
11/23/2015*; 7:00 pm		Tulsa	L 67–74	2–2	Bud Walton Arena (1,653); Fayetteville, AR
11/27/2015*; 1:30 pm		vs. Louisiana–Lafayette; San Juan Shootout	L 59–67	2–3	Mario Morales Coliseum (898); Guaynabo, PR
11/28/2015*; 1:30 pm		vs. No. 7 Oregon State; San Juan Shootout	L 47–63	2–4	Mario Morales Coliseum; Guaynabo, PR
12/02/2015*; 7:00 pm		Missouri State	L 54–69	2–5	Bud Walton Arena (1,551); Fayetteville, AR
12/06/2015*; 1:00 pm		at Rutgers	L 40–60	2–6	Louis Brown Athletic Center (1,810); Piscataway, NJ
12/10/2015*; 8:00 pm, SECN		Oral Roberts	W 65–50	3–6	Bud Walton Arena (1,348); Fayetteville, AR
12/13/2015*; 1:00 pm, CST		at Butler	L 57–63	3–7	Tudor Fieldhouse (634); Indianapolis, IN
12/20/2015*; 1:30 pm, FS1		vs. No. 5 Texas; Big 12/SEC Women's Challenge	L 50–61	3–8	Chesapeake Energy Arena; Oklahoma City, OK
12/28/2015*; 7:00 pm		Mississippi Valley State	W 86–46	4–8	Bud Walton Arena (1,755); Fayetteville, AR
12/30/2015*; 7:00 pm		New Orleans	W 73–41	5–8	Bud Walton Arena (1,930); Fayetteville, AR
SEC regular season
01/03/2016; 2:00 pm, ESPNU		at No. 2 South Carolina	L 32–85	5–9 (0–1)	Colonial Life Arena (13,407); Columbia, SC
01/07/2016; 7:00 pm, SECN		No. 13 Texas A&M	W 67–61	6–9 (1–1)	Bud Walton Arena (1,494); Fayetteville, AR
01/10/2016; 2:00 pm		at No. 7 Mississippi State	L 55–80	6–10 (1–2)	Humphrey Coliseum (5,710); Starkville, MS
01/14/2016; 8:00 pm, SECN		No. 13 Tennessee	W 64–59	7–10 (2–2)	Bud Walton Arena (1,644); Fayetteville, AR
01/17/2016; 2:00 pm, SECN		No. 24 Missouri	W 64–52	8–10 (3–2)	Bud Walton Arena (4,160); Fayetteville, AR
01/21/2016; 7:00 pm		at LSU	W 48–44	9–10 (4–2)	Maravich Center (2,084); Baton Rouge, LA
01/24/2016; 3:00 pm, SECN		at Auburn	L 60–71 ^{OT}	9–11 (4–3)	Auburn Arena (2,807); Auburn, AL
01/28/2016; 7:00 pm		Florida	L 66–71 ^{OT}	9–12 (4–4)	Bud Walton Arena (1,576); Fayetteville, AR
01/31/2016; 2:00 pm		No. 13 Mississippi State	L 55–65	9–13 (4–5)	Bud Walton Arena (5,273); Fayetteville, AR
02/04/2016; 6:00 pm		at No. 23 Tennessee	L 57–75	9–14 (4–6)	Thompson–Boling Arena (9,414); Knoxville, TN
02/08/2016; 6:00 pm, SECN		Vanderbilt	W 57–56	10–14 (5–6)	Bud Walton Arena (1,946); Fayetteville, AR
02/14/2016; 2:00 pm		at Missouri	L 48–69	10–15 (5–7)	Mizzou Arena (4,766); Columbia, MO
02/18/2016; 7:00 pm		Alabama	W 69–67	11–15 (6–7)	Bud Walton Arena (1,591); Fayetteville, AR
02/21/2016; 2:00 pm, SECN		at No. 16 Kentucky	L 63–77	11–16 (6–8)	Memorial Coliseum (7,589); Lexington, KY
02/25/2016; 6:00 pm, SECN		at Georgia	L 57–72	11–17 (6–9)	Stegeman Coliseum (3,131); Athens, GA
02/28/2016; 3:00 pm, SECN		Ole Miss	W 60–49	12–17 (7–9)	Bud Walton Arena (3,132); Fayetteville, AR
SEC Women's Tournament
03/03/2016; 5:00 pm, SECN	(10)	vs. (7) Tennessee; Second Round	L 51–68	12–18	Jacksonville Veterans Memorial Arena; Jacksonville, FL
*Non-conference game. ^{#}Rankings from AP Polls. (#) Tournament seedings in parentheses. All times are in Central Time.

== Rankings ==
2015–16 NCAA Division I women's basketball rankings

Regular season polls
Poll	Pre- Season	Week 2	Week 3	Week 4	Week 5	Week 6	Week 7	Week 8	Week 9	Week 10	Week 11	Week 12	Week 13	Week 14	Week 15	Week 16	Week 17	Week 18	Week 19	Final
AP	RV	RV	RV	NR	NR	NR	NR	NR	NR	NR	RV	NR	NR	NR	NR	NR	NR	NR	NR	N/A
Coaches	NR	NR	NR	NR	NR	NR	NR	NR	NR	NR	NR	NR	NR	NR	NR	NR	NR	NR	NR	NR

Legend
	Increase in ranking
	Decrease in ranking
	Not ranked previous week
(RV)	Received Votes

== See also ==
- 2015–16 Arkansas Razorbacks men's basketball team
