= 2015–16 LSU Lady Tigers basketball team =

Intercollegiate basketball season

2015–16 LSU Lady Tigers basketball
- Conference: Southeastern Conference
- Record: 10–21 (3–13 SEC)
- Head coach: Nikki Fargas (5th season)
- Assistant coaches: Tasha Butts; Mickie DeMoss; Charlene Thomas-Swinson
- Home arena: Pete Maravich Assembly Center

2015–16 SEC women's basketball standings
	Conf.				Overall
Team	W		L	PCT	W		L	PCT
No. 3 South Carolina †	16	–	0	1.000	33	–	2	.943
No. 15 Mississippi State	11	–	5	.688	28	–	8	.778
No. 18 Texas A&M	11	–	5	.688	22	–	10	.688
No. 12 Kentucky	10	–	6	.625	25	–	8	.758
No. 25 Florida	10	–	6	.625	22	–	9	.710
Georgia	9	–	7	.563	21	–	10	.677
Missouri	8	–	8	.500	22	–	10	.688
Tennessee	8	–	8	.500	22	–	14	.611
Auburn	8	–	8	.500	20	–	13	.606
Arkansas	7	–	9	.438	12	–	18	.400
Vanderbilt	5	–	11	.313	18	–	14	.563
Alabama	4	–	12	.250	15	–	16	.484
LSU	3	–	13	.188	10	–	21	.323
Ole Miss	2	–	14	.125	10	–	20	.333
† 2016 SEC tournament winner As of March 27, 2016; Rankings from AP poll

The 2015–16 LSU Lady Tigers basketball team represented Louisiana State University during the 2015–16 NCAA Division I women's basketball season college basketball season. The Lady Tigers are led by fifth year head coach Nikki Fargas. They played their home games at Pete Maravich Assembly Center and were members of the Southeastern Conference. They finished the season 10–21, 3–13 in SEC play to finish in thirteenth place. They advanced to the second round of the SEC women's tournament, where they lost to Kentucky.

== Roster ==
2015–16 LSU Tigers women's basketball team
Players
Coaches

Pos.	#	Name	Height	Year	Previous school	Hometown
G	0	Chloe Jackson (I) (redshirt)	5 ft 9 in (1.75 m)	So	Riverdale Baptist; NC State	Upper Marlboro, MD
G	1	Jenna Deemer	5 ft 7 in (1.7 m)	So	Ursuline Academy	New Orleans, LA
G	2	Shanice Norton	5 ft 8 in (1.73 m)	Fr	Potter's House Christian Academy	London, England
G	3	Akilah Bethel	6 ft 0 in (1.83 m)	RS Sr	Academy of Holy Cross; West Virginia	Baltimore, MD
G/F	4	Anne Pedersen	6 ft 1 in (1.85 m)	RS Sr	The Rock School (Fla.)	Copenhagen, Denmark
F	5	Ayana Mitchell	6 ft 2 in (1.88 m)	Fr	Salem HS	Conyers, GA
G	10	Jasmine Rhodes	5 ft 10 in (1.78 m)	Jr	Faith Academy	Mobile, AL
G	11	Raigyne Moncrief	5 ft 10 in (1.78 m)	Jr	American Heritage HS	Fort Lauderdale, FL
G	13	Rina Hill	5 ft 7 in (1.7 m)	Jr	IMG Academy	Nagoya-Shi, Japan
F	20	Alexis Hyder	5 ft 11 in (1.8 m)	RS Jr	Lyndon B. Johnson Early College HS; North Texas	Austin, TX
F	23	Stephanie Amichia	6 ft 1 in (1.85 m)	So	North Gwinnett HS	Suwanee, GA
F	31	Ann Jones	6 ft 3 in (1.91 m)	RS Sr	Liberty Magnet School; Memphis	Jackson, TN
F/C	35	Alliyah Fareo	6 ft 3 in (1.91 m)	So	New South Wales HS	Sydney, Australia
F	44	Tatum Neubert (I) (redshirt)	6 ft 2 in (1.88 m)	So	Elizabeth HS; Oregon	Elizabeth, CO

Head coach

Nikki Fargas (Tennessee)

Assistant coach(es)

Tasha Butts (Tennessee)
Tony Perotti (Tennessee)
Charlene Thomas-Swinson (Auburn)

Legend

- (C) Team captain
- (S) Suspended
- (I) Ineligible
- (W) Walk-on
- Injured
- Current redshirt

Roster

== Schedule and results ==
Date time, TV	Rank^{#}	Opponent^{#}	Result	Record	Site (attendance) city, state
Exhibition
11/04/2015*; 7:00 pm		Union (TN)	W 88–57		Maravich Center; Baton Rouge, LA
Non-conference regular season
11/13/2015*; 4:00 pm, ESPN3		at Wake Forest	L 57–60	0–1	LJVM Coliseum (662); Winston-Salem, NC
11/15/2015*; 3:00 pm		Louisiana–Monroe	W 61–54 ^{OT}	1–1	Maravich Center (2,472); Baton Rouge, LA
11/18/2015*; 7:15 pm, CST		at Little Rock	W 57–51	2–1	Jack Stephens Center (2,275); Little Rock, AR
11/21/2015*; 2:00 pm		Long Beach State	W 59–53	3–1	Maravich Center (2,026); Baton Rouge, LA
11/23/2015*; 7:00 pm, CST		at Tulane	L 63–67	3–2	Devlin Fieldhouse (2,173); New Orleans, LA
11/27/2015*; 6:30 pm, CST		vs. Purdue; Gulf Coast Showcase quarterfinals	L 52–69	3–3	Germain Arena (1,257); Estero, FL
11/28/2015*; 12:30 pm, CST		vs. Marist; Gulf Coast Showcase Consolation 2nd round	W 72–49	4–3	Germain Arena (1,015); Estero, FL
11/29/2015*; 12:30 pm, CST		vs. Maine; Gulf Coast Showcase 5th place game	L 41–52	4–4	Germain Arena; Estero, FL
12/01/2015*; 11:00 am		Texas Southern	W 86–36	5–4	Maravich Center (5,504); Baton Rouge, LA
12/13/2015*; 3:00 pm, SECN		UC Santa Barbara	W 68–50	6–4	Maravich Center (2,604); Baton Rouge, LA
12/19/2015*; 1:00 pm, BTN		at Rutgers	L 57–69	6–5	Louis Brown Athletic Center (2,254); Piscataway, NJ
12/21/2015*; 6:00 pm, SNY		at No. 1 Connecticut	L 40–86	6–6	XL Center (10,183); Hartford, CT
12/28/2015*; 7:00 pm		Samford	L 44–47	6–7	Maravich Center (2,511); Baton Rouge, LA
SEC regular season
01/03/2016; 2:00 pm, SECN		at Alabama	L 45–62	6–8 (0–1)	Foster Auditorium (2,705); Tuscaloosa, AL
01/07/2016; 7:30 pm, SECN		Ole Miss	W 76–57	7–8 (1–1)	Maravich Center (2,189); Baton Rouge, LA
01/10/2016; 3:00 pm, SECN		No. 13 Texas A&M	L 35–53	7–9 (1–2)	Maravich Center (3,774); Baton Rouge, LA
01/14/2016; 7:00 pm		at Vanderbilt	L 42–58	7–10 (1–3)	Memorial Gymnasium (2,332); Nashville, TN
01/17/2016; 6:00 pm		at No. 20 Florida	L 45–53	7–11 (1–4)	O'Connell Center (1,819); Gainesville, FL
01/21/2016; 7:00 pm		Arkansas	L 44–48	7–12 (1–5)	Maravich Center (2,084); Baton Rouge, LA
01/24/2016; 1:00 pm		at Georgia	W 53–46	8–12 (2–5)	Stegeman Coliseum (3,538); Athens, GA
01/28/2016; 7:00 pm		at No. 22 Missouri	L 46–52	8–13 (2–6)	Mizzou Arena (3,397); Columbia, MO
02/01/2016; 6:00 pm, SECN		Auburn	L 53–63	8–14 (2–7)	Maravich Center (2,150); Baton Rouge, LA
02/04/2016; 8:00 pm, SECN		No. 11 Mississippi State	L 52–71	8–15 (2–8)	Maravich Center (2,194); Baton Rouge, LA
02/07/2016; 11:00 am, SECN		at No. 18 Kentucky	L 58–70	8–16 (2–9)	Memorial Coliseum (6,110); Lexington, KY
02/14/2016; 2:00 pm		Georgia	L 47–58	8–17 (2–10)	Maravich Center (3,781); Baton Rouge, LA
02/18/2016; 8:00 pm, SECN		at No. 12 Texas A&M	L 54–68	8–18 (2–11)	Reed Arena (4,797); College Station, TX
02/21/2016; 1:00 pm, ESPNU		No. 24 Tennessee	W 57–56	9–18 (3–11)	Maravich Center (3,132); Baton Rouge, LA
02/25/2016; 7:30 pm, SECN		Florida	L 56–82	9–19 (3–12)	Maravich Center (2,731); Baton Rouge, LA
02/28/2016; 1:00 pm, ESPNU		at No. 3 South Carolina	L 39–75	9–20 (3–13)	Colonial Life Arena (16,240); Columbia, SC
2016 SEC Tournament
03/02/2016; 10:00 am, SECN		vs. Alabama; First Round	W 58–49	10–20	Jacksonville Veterans Memorial Arena; Jacksonville, FL
03/03/2016; 1:30 pm, SECN		vs. No. 13 Kentucky; Second Round	L 71–79	10–21	Jacksonville Veterans Memorial Arena (2,245); Jacksonville, FL
*Non-conference game. ^{#}Rankings from AP Poll. (#) Tournament seedings in parentheses. All times are in Central Time.

== Rankings ==
2015–16 NCAA Division I women's basketball rankings

Regular season polls
Poll	Pre- Season	Week 2	Week 3	Week 4	Week 5	Week 6	Week 7	Week 8	Week 9	Week 10	Week 11	Week 12	Week 13	Week 14	Week 15	Week 16	Week 17	Week 18	Week 19	Final
AP	NR	NR	NR	NR	NR	NR	NR	NR	NR	NR	NR	NR	NR	NR	NR	NR	NR	NR	NR	N/A
Coaches	RV	NR	NR	NR	NR	NR	NR	NR	NR	NR	NR	NR	NR	NR	NR	NR	NR	NR	NR	NR

Legend
	Increase in ranking
	Decrease in ranking
	Not ranked previous week
(RV)	Received Votes

== See also ==
- 2015–16 LSU Tigers basketball team
