= 2015–16 Missouri Tigers women's basketball team =

Intercollegiate basketball season

2015–16 Missouri Tigers women's basketball

Saint Mary's Classic champions

NCAA tournament, second round
- Conference: Southeastern Conference
- Record: 22–10 (8–8 SEC)
- Head coach: Robin Pingeton (6th season)
- Assistant coaches: Jenny Putnam; RaeShara Brown
- Home arena: Mizzou Arena

2015–16 SEC women's basketball standings
	Conf.				Overall
Team	W		L	PCT	W		L	PCT
No. 3 South Carolina †	16	–	0	1.000	33	–	2	.943
No. 15 Mississippi State	11	–	5	.688	28	–	8	.778
No. 18 Texas A&M	11	–	5	.688	22	–	10	.688
No. 12 Kentucky	10	–	6	.625	25	–	8	.758
No. 25 Florida	10	–	6	.625	22	–	9	.710
Georgia	9	–	7	.563	21	–	10	.677
Missouri	8	–	8	.500	22	–	10	.688
Tennessee	8	–	8	.500	22	–	14	.611
Auburn	8	–	8	.500	20	–	13	.606
Arkansas	7	–	9	.438	12	–	18	.400
Vanderbilt	5	–	11	.313	18	–	14	.563
Alabama	4	–	12	.250	15	–	16	.484
LSU	3	–	13	.188	10	–	21	.323
Ole Miss	2	–	14	.125	10	–	20	.333
† 2016 SEC tournament winner As of March 27, 2016; Rankings from AP poll

The 2015–16 Missouri Tigers women's basketball team represented the University of Missouri in the 2015–16 NCAA Division I women's basketball season. The Tigers were led by sixth-year head coach Robin Pingeton. They played their games at Mizzou Arena and were members of the Southeastern Conference. They finished the season 22–10, 8–8 in SEC play to finish in a three-way tie for seventh place. They lost in the second round of the SEC women's tournament to Auburn. They received an at-large bid to the NCAA women's tournament, which was their first trip since 2006. They defeated BYU in the first round before losing to Texas in the second round.

== Roster ==
2015–16 Missouri Tigers women's basketball team
Players
Coaches

Pos.	#	Name	Height	Year	Previous school	Hometown
G	1	Lianna Doty	5 ft 7 in (1.7 m)	RS Jr	Kirkwood	St. Louis, MO
G	2	Morgan Stock	6 ft 1 in (1.85 m)	Sr	St. Joseph's Academy	Town & Country, MO
G	3	Sophie Cunningham	6 ft 1 in (1.85 m)	Fr	Rock Bridge	Columbia, MO
F	4	Bri Porter	6 ft 3 in (1.91 m)	So	Rock Bridge	Columbia, MO
F	5	Davionna Holmes	6 ft 3 in (1.91 m)	RS So	East St. Louis; Louisville	East St. Louis, IL
G	10	Maddie Stock	6 ft 0 in (1.83 m)	Sr	St. Joseph's Academy	Town & Country, MO
G	11	Lindsey Cunningham	6 ft 0 in (1.83 m)	RS Jr	Rock Bridge	Columbia, MO
F	12	Michelle Hudyn	6 ft 2 in (1.88 m)	Jr	Eastwood Collegiate	Kitchener, ON
F	13	Hannah Schuchts	6 ft 2 in (1.88 m)	Fr	Maclay School	Tallahassee, FL
G	15	Carrie Shephard	5 ft 4 in (1.63 m)	So	South Pemiscot	Steele, MO
F	20	Kayla McDowell	6 ft 2 in (1.88 m)	Jr	Mason	Cincinnati, OH
F	21	Cierra Porter	6 ft 4 in (1.93 m)	Fr	Rock Bridge	Columbia, MO
G/F	22	Jordan Fereicks	6 ft 1 in (1.85 m)	Jr	Quincy Notre Dame	Quincy, IL
G	23	Juanita Robinson	5 ft 10 in (1.78 m)	Sr	Zion-Benton; Johnson County CC	Chicago, IL
G	24	Sierra Michaelis	5 ft 10 in (1.78 m)	Jr	North Mercer	Mercer, MO

Head coach

- Robin Pingeton (St. Ambrose)

Assistant coach(es)

- Jenny Putnam (St. Ambrose)
- RaeShara Brown (Missouri)

Legend

- (C) Team captain
- (S) Suspended
- (I) Ineligible
- (W) Walk-on
- Injured
- Current redshirt

Roster

== Schedule and results ==
Date time, TV	Rank^{#}	Opponent^{#}	Result	Record	Site (attendance) city, state
Exhibition
11/04/2015*; 7:00 pm		Southwest Baptist	W 96–54		Mizzou Arena (1,094); Columbia, MO
11/09/2015*; 7:00 pm		Quincy	W 97–54		Mizzou Arena (1,103); Columbia, MO
Non-conference regular season
11/13/2015*; 7:05 pm, ESPN3		at Missouri State	W 71–55	1–0	JQH Arena (4,878); Springfield, MO
11/16/2015*; 7:00 pm		Arkansas–Pine Bluff	W 85–34	2–0	Mizzou Arena (1,116); Columbia, MO
11/18/2015*; 7:05 pm, ESPN3		at Wichita State	W 57–37	3–0	Charles Koch Arena (1,479); Wichita, KS
11/22/2015*; 7:00 pm, SECN		Wake Forest	W 94–81	4–0	Mizzou Arena (2,538); Columbia, MO
11/24/2015*; 7:00 pm		SIU Edwardsville	W 75–46	5–0	Mizzou Arena (2,228); Columbia, MO
11/27/2015*; 2:00 pm		vs. Northeastern; Saint Mary's Classic	W 69–56	6–0	McKeon Pavilion (175); Moraga, CA
11/28/2015*; 4:00 pm		at Saint Mary's; Saint Mary's Classic	W 95–78	7–0	McKeon Pavilion (485); Moraga, CA
12/02/2015*; 7:00 pm		Southeast Missouri State	W 74–32	8–0	Mizzou Arena (2,061); Columbia, MO
12/07/2015*; 7:00 pm		Loyola Marymount	W 80–48	9–0	Mizzou Arena (3,832); Columbia, MO
12/12/2015*; 2:30 pm, P12N		at Colorado	W 79–75	10–0	Coors Events Center (1,828); Boulder, CO
12/20/2015*; 2:00 pm		Lamar	W 91–57	11–0	Mizzou Arena (3,358); Columbia, MO
12/21/2015*; 7:00 pm	No. 25	Texas State	W 82–56	12–0	Mizzou Arena (3,844); Columbia, MO
12/29/2015*; 5:30 pm	No. 23	Charlotte	W 88–71	13–0	Mizzou Arena (6,154); Columbia, MO
SEC regular season
01/04/2016; 6:00 pm, SECN	No. 20	No. 12 Tennessee	L 54–71	13–1 (0–1)	Mizzou Arena (7,989); Columbia, MO
01/06/2016; 6:00 pm	No. 20	at Georgia	W 54–48	14–1 (1–1)	Stegeman Coliseum (1,935); Athens, GA
01/10/2016; 11:00 am, SECN	No. 20	at No. 2 South Carolina	L 58–83	14–2 (1–2)	Colonial Life Arena (15,934); Columbia, SC
01/14/2016; 7:00 pm	No. 24	No. 7 Mississippi State	W 66–54	15–2 (2–2)	Mizzou Arena (3,461); Columbia, MO
01/17/2016; 2:00 pm, SECN	No. 24	at Arkansas	L 52–64	15–3 (2–3)	Bud Walton Arena (4,160); Fayetteville, AR
01/21/2016; 7:00 pm	No. 23	at No. 15 Texas A&M	L 77–81	15–4 (2–4)	Reed Arena (3,844); College Station, TX
01/24/2016; 1:00 pm, SECN	No. 23	No. 22 Florida	W 79–64	16–4 (3–4)	Mizzou Arena (5,941); Columbia, MO
01/28/2016; 7:00 pm	No. 22	LSU	W 52–46	17–4 (4–4)	Mizzou Arena (3,397); Columbia, MO
01/31/2016; 4:00 pm, SECN	No. 22	at Ole Miss	W 60–46	18–4 (5–4)	The Pavilion at Ole Miss (1,686); Oxford, MS
02/04/2016; 7:00 pm	No. 21	Georgia	L 50–65	18–5 (5–5)	Mizzou Arena (4,086); Columbia, MO
02/07/2016; 2:00 pm	No. 21	at No. 11 Mississippi State	L 42–52	18–6 (5–6)	Humphrey Coliseum (4,521); Starkville, MS
02/11/2016; 7:00 pm		Alabama	W 63–52	19–6 (6–6)	Mizzou Arena (3,028); Columbia, MO
02/14/2016; 2:00 pm		Arkansas	W 69–48	20–6 (7–6)	Mizzou Arena (4,766); Columbia, MO
02/21/2016; 2:00 pm		at Auburn	W 69–55	21–6 (8–6)	Auburn Arena (2,522); Auburn, AL
02/26/2016; 6:00 pm, SECN	No. 24	at No. 15 Kentucky	L 69–79	21–7 (8–7)	Memorial Coliseum (6,496); Lexington, KY
02/28/2016; 1:00 pm, SECN	No. 24	Vanderbilt	L 52–56	21–8 (8–8)	Mizzou Arena (5,998); Columbia, MO
SEC Women's Tournament
03/03/2016; 11:00 am, SECN		vs. Auburn; Second Round	L 45–47	21–9	Jacksonville Veterans Memorial Arena; Jacksonville, FL
NCAA Women's Tournament
03/19/2016*; 5:45 pm, ESPN2	(10 B)	vs. (7 B) BYU; First Round	W 78–69	22–9	Frank Erwin Center (2,566); Austin, TX
03/21/2016*; 8:15 pm, ESPN2	(10 B)	at (2 B) No. 7 Texas; Second Round	L 55–73	22–10	Frank Erwin Center (2,345); Austin, TX
*Non-conference game. ^{#}Rankings from AP Poll. (#) Tournament seedings in parentheses. B=Bridgeport Region. All times are in Central Time.

== Rankings ==
Regular season polls
Poll	Pre- season	Week 2	Week 3	Week 4	Week 5	Week 6	Week 7	Week 8	Week 9	Week 10	Week 11	Week 12	Week 13	Week 14	Week 15	Week 16	Week 17	Week 18	Week 19	Final
AP	RV	RV	RV	RV	RV	RV	25	23	20	24	23	22	21	RV	RV	24	RV	NR	NR	N/A
Coaches	NR	NR	NR	RV	RV	RV	RV	RV	RV	RV	RV	24	21	RV	RV	24	RV	NR	NR	NR

Legend
	Increase in ranking
	Decrease in ranking
	Not ranked previous week
(RV)	Received votes

== See also ==
- 2015–16 Missouri Tigers men's basketball team
