= 2015–16 Auburn Tigers women's basketball team =

Intercollegiate basketball season

2015–16 Auburn Tigers women's basketball

NCAA Women's Tournament, second round
- Conference: Southeastern Conference
- Record: 20–13 (8–8 SEC)
- Head coach: Terri Williams-Flournoy (4th season)
- Assistant coaches: Ty Evans; Adrian Walters; Sherill Baker
- Home arena: Auburn Arena

2015–16 SEC women's basketball standings
	Conf.				Overall
Team	W		L	PCT	W		L	PCT
No. 3 South Carolina †	16	–	0	1.000	33	–	2	.943
No. 15 Mississippi State	11	–	5	.688	28	–	8	.778
No. 18 Texas A&M	11	–	5	.688	22	–	10	.688
No. 12 Kentucky	10	–	6	.625	25	–	8	.758
No. 25 Florida	10	–	6	.625	22	–	9	.710
Georgia	9	–	7	.563	21	–	10	.677
Missouri	8	–	8	.500	22	–	10	.688
Tennessee	8	–	8	.500	22	–	14	.611
Auburn	8	–	8	.500	20	–	13	.606
Arkansas	7	–	9	.438	12	–	18	.400
Vanderbilt	5	–	11	.313	18	–	14	.563
Alabama	4	–	12	.250	15	–	16	.484
LSU	3	–	13	.188	10	–	21	.323
Ole Miss	2	–	14	.125	10	–	20	.333
† 2016 SEC tournament winner As of March 27, 2016; Rankings from AP poll

The 2015–16 Auburn Tigers women's basketball team represented Auburn University during the 2015–16 NCAA Division I women's basketball season. The Tigers, led by fourth-year head coach Terri Williams-Flournoy, played their home games at Auburn Arena and were members of the Southeastern Conference. They finished the season 20–13, 8–8 in SEC play to finish in a three-way tie for seventh place. They advanced to the quarterfinals of the SEC women's tournament, where they lost to South Carolina. They received an at-large bid to the NCAA women's tournament, where they defeated St. John's in the first before losing to Baylor in the second round.

== Roster ==
2015–16 Auburn Tigers women's basketball team
Players
Coaches

Pos.	#	Name	Height	Year	Previous school	Hometown
G	2	Bria Johnson	5 ft 8 in (1.73 m)	So	Episcopal	Baton Rouge, LA
G	3	Erica Sanders	5 ft 10 in (1.78 m)	Fr	Johnson	San Antonio, TX
G	10	Brandy Montgomery	5 ft 10 in (1.78 m)	Jr	Lincoln Park Academy	Port St. Lucie, FL
F	12	Jonika Garvin	6 ft 0 in (1.83 m)	Fr	Lake Worth Community	Lake Worth, FL
G/F	13	Katie Frerking	6 ft 1 in (1.85 m)	So	Wesleyan School	Johns Creek, GA
G	14	Tiffany Lewis (I) (redshirt)	5 ft 8 in (1.73 m)	Jr	Riverdale; Clemson	Chattanooga, TN
F	15	Jazmine Jones	6 ft 2 in (1.88 m)	So	West Forsyth	Winston-Salem, NC
G	23	Jessica Jones	6 ft 2 in (1.88 m)	So	West Forsyth	Winston-Salem, NC
G	25	Neydja Petithomme	5 ft 8 in (1.73 m)	So	Grandview Prep	Boca Raton, FL
G	33	Janiah McKay	5 ft 6 in (1.68 m)	Fr	Gainesville	Gainesville, FL
F	35	Cabriana Capers	6 ft 1 in (1.85 m)	Sr	Bolingbrook	Bolingbrook, IL
G	40	Ndeye Dieng	5 ft 10 in (1.78 m)	Jr	Gatewood School	Dakar, Senegal
F/C	44	Tra'Cee Tanner	6 ft 3 in (1.91 m)	Sr	Hoover	Birmingham, AL

Head coach

- Terri Williams-Flournoy (Penn State)

Assistant coach(es)

- Ty Evans (UW–Whitewater)
- Adrian Walters (Saint Francis (PA))
- Sherill Baker (Georgia)

Legend

- (C) Team captain
- (S) Suspended
- (I) Ineligible
- (W) Walk-on
- Injured
- Current redshirt

Roster

== Schedule ==
Date time, TV	Rank^{#}	Opponent^{#}	Result	Record	Site (attendance) city, state
Non-conference regular season
11/13/2015*; 5:30 pm		UAB	W 85–71	1–0	Auburn Arena (3,110); Auburn, AL
11/16/2015*; 7:00 pm		at Southeastern Louisiana	W 80–68	2–0	University Center (794); Hammond, LA
11/19/2015*; 6:00 pm, SECN		Virginia	L 52–69	2–1	Auburn Arena (1,675); Auburn, AL
11/22/2015*; 3:00 pm		at Savannah State	W 62–40	3–1	Tiger Arena (2,922); Savannah, GA
11/27/2015*; 6:00 pm		vs. Boise State; San Juan Shootout	W 55–53	4–1	Mario Morales Coliseum (116); Guaynabo, PR
11/28/2015*; 6:00 pm		vs. Minnesota; San Juan Shootout	W 81–79 ^{OT}	5–1	Mario Morales Coliseum (110); Guaynabo, PR
12/05/2015*; 12:00 pm		East Carolina	W 83–69	6–1	Auburn Arena (1,886); Auburn, AL
12/13/2015*; 1:00 pm		at Marquette	L 69–70 ^{OT}	6–2	Al McGuire Center (1,275); Milwaukee, WI
12/16/2015*; 11:00 am		Winthrop	W 76–33	7–2	Auburn Arena (2,429); Auburn, AL
12/19/2015*; 1:00 pm		vs. Coppin State	W 69–54	8–2	SECU Arena (250); Towson, MD
12/20/2015*; 1:00 pm		at Towson	W 74–52	9–2	SECU Arena; Towson, MD
12/23/2015*; 6:00 pm		George Mason	W 88–59	10–2	Auburn Arena (1,817); Auburn, AL
12/30/2015*; 6:00 pm		at Florida Gulf Coast	L 45–52	10–3	Alico Arena (1,710); Fort Myers, FL
SEC regular season
01/03/2016; 2:00 pm		No. 7 Kentucky	W 66–61	11–3 (1–0)	Auburn Arena (2,677); Auburn, AL
01/07/2016; 7:30 pm, SECN		at No. 7 Mississippi State	L 45–60	11–4 (1–1)	Humphrey Coliseum (4,610); Starkville, MS
01/10/2016; 1:00 pm, ESPNU		at No. 12 Tennessee	L 52–79	11–5 (1–2)	Thompson–Boling Arena (11,539); Knoxville, TN
01/14/2016; 6:00 pm		Alabama	W 72–59	12–5 (2–2)	Auburn Arena (3,383); Auburn, AL
01/17/2016; 12:00 pm, SECN		at No. 9 Kentucky	L 47–54	12–6 (2–3)	Memorial Coliseum (6,171); Lexington, KY
01/21/2016; 6:00 pm		No. 2 South Carolina	L 58–74	12–7 (2–4)	Auburn Arena (2,419); Auburn, AL
01/24/2016; 3:00 pm, SECN		Arkansas	W 71–60 ^{OT}	13–7 (3–4)	Auburn Arena (2,807); Auburn, AL
01/28/2016; 6:00 pm, SECN		at Georgia	L 30–63	13–8 (3–5)	Stegeman Coliseum (1,961); Athens, GA
02/01/2016; 6:00 pm, SECN		at LSU	W 63–53	14–8 (4–5)	Maravich Center (2,150); Baton Rouge, LA
02/04/2016; 6:00 pm		Vanderbilt	W 53–45	15–8 (5–5)	Auburn Arena (2,176); Auburn, AL
02/07/2016; 1:00 pm, SECN		at Alabama	W 59–55	16–8 (6–5)	Foster Auditorium (3,303); Tuscaloosa, AL
02/11/2016; 6:00 pm		at Ole Miss	W 65–60	17–8 (7–5)	The Pavilion at Ole Miss (1,335); Oxford, MS
02/14/2016; 1:00 pm, SECN		No. 16 Florida	W 80–58	18–8 (8–5)	Auburn Arena (2,760); Auburn, AL
02/21/2016; 2:00 pm		Missouri	L 55–69	18–9 (8–6)	Auburn Arena (2,522); Auburn, AL
02/25/2016; 6:30 pm, SECN		No. 11 Texas A&M	L 49–57	18–10 (8–7)	Auburn Arena (3,651); Auburn, AL
02/28/2016; 1:00 pm		at Florida	L 49–56	18–11 (8–8)	O'Connell Center (4,019); Gainesville, FL
SEC Women's Tournament
03/03/2016; 11:00 am, SECN		vs. Missouri; Second Round	W 47–45	19–11	Jacksonville Veterans Memorial Arena; Jacksonville, FL
03/04/2016; 11:00 am, SECN		vs. No. 2 South Carolina; Quarterfinals	L 48–57	19–12	Jacksonville Veterans Memorial Arena; Jacksonville, FL
NCAA Women's Tournament
03/18/2016*; 6:30 pm, ESPN2	(9 D)	vs. (8 D) St. John's; First Round	W 68–57	20–12	Ferrell Center (4,990); Austin, TX
03/20/2016*; 6:00 pm, ESPN2	(9 D)	at (1 D) No. 4 Baylor; Second Round	L 52–84	20–13	Ferrell Center (4,665); Austin, TX
*Non-conference game. ^{#}Rankings from AP Poll. (#) Tournament seedings in parentheses. D=Dallas Region. All times are in Central Time.

== Rankings ==
Regular season polls
Poll	Pre- season	Week 2	Week 3	Week 4	Week 5	Week 6	Week 7	Week 8	Week 9	Week 10	Week 11	Week 12	Week 13	Week 14	Week 15	Week 16	Week 17	Week 18	Week 19	Final
AP	NR	NR	NR	NR	NR	NR	NR	NR	NR	NR	NR	NR	NR	NR	RV	NR	NR	NR	NR	N/A
Coaches	NR	NR	NR	NR	RV	RV	NR	RV	RV	NR	NR	NR	NR	RV	RV	RV	NR	NR	NR	RV

Legend
	Increase in ranking
	Decrease in ranking
	No change
(RV)	Received votes
(NR)	Not ranked

== See also ==
- 2015–16 Auburn Tigers men's basketball team
