= 2015–16 Kansas State Wildcats women's basketball team =

Intercollegiate basketball season

2015–16 Kansas State Wildcats women's basketball

NCAA Women's Tournament, second round
- Conference: Big 12 Conference
- Record: 19–13 (8–10 Big 12)
- Head coach: Jeff Mittie (2nd season)
- Assistant coaches: Brian Ostermann; Ebony Gilliam; Jacie Hoyt-Capra
- Home arena: Bramlage Coliseum

2015–16 Big 12 Conference women's basketball standings
	Conf.				Overall
Team	W		L	PCT	W		L	PCT
No. 4 Baylor †	17	–	1	.944	36	–	2	.947
No. 6 Texas	15	–	3	.833	31	–	5	.861
No. 22 West Virginia	12	–	6	.667	25	–	10	.714
Oklahoma State	11	–	7	.611	21	–	10	.677
No. 24 Oklahoma	11	–	7	.611	22	–	11	.667
Kansas State	8	–	10	.444	19	–	13	.594
TCU	8	–	10	.444	18	–	15	.545
Iowa State	5	–	13	.278	13	–	17	.433
Texas Tech	3	–	15	.167	13	–	18	.419
Kansas	0	–	18	.000	6	–	25	.194
† 2016 Big 12 Tournament winner Rankings from AP poll

The 2015–16 Kansas State Wildcats women's basketball team represented Kansas State University in the 2015–16 NCAA Division I women's basketball season. The Wildcats were led by second-year head coach Jeff Mittie. They played their home games at Bramlage Coliseum in Manhattan, Kansas and were members of the Big 12 Conference. They finished the season 19–13, 8–10 in Big 12 play to finish in a tie for sixth place. They lost in the quarterfinals of the Big 12 women's tournament to West Virginia. They received an at-large bid to the NCAA women's tournament, where they defeated George Washington in the first round before losing to South Carolina in the second round.

== Roster ==
2015–16 Kansas State Wildcats women's basketball team
Players
Coaches

Pos.	#	Name	Height	Year	Previous school	Hometown
F	0	Jessica Sheble	6 ft 3 in (1.91 m)	Jr	Olathe North	Olathe, KS
G	1	Kaylee Page	6 ft 2 in (1.88 m)	So	Wamego; Nebraska	Wamego, KS
F	2	Erica Young	6 ft 1 in (1.85 m)	Jr	Tampa Bay Tech	Tampa, FL
F	3	Lanie Page	6 ft 3 in (1.91 m)	Fr	Wamego	Wamego, KS
G	10	Kayla Goth	6 ft 1 in (1.85 m)	Fr	DeForest	DeForest, WI
G	11	Antoinette Taylor	5 ft 7 in (1.7 m)	Sr	West Side; State Fair CC	Gary, IN
G	12	Kelly Thomson	5 ft 9 in (1.75 m)	RS Jr	Riley County	Riley, KS
G	15	Megan Deines	6 ft 1 in (1.85 m)	Sr	Glendale; Louisville	Springfield, MO
G	20	Bri Craig	5 ft 10 in (1.78 m)	Sr	Lincoln Northeast	Lincoln, NE
F	22	Breanna Lewis	6 ft 5 in (1.96 m)	Jr	Riverside	Milwaukee, WI
G	23	Anna Hammaker	5 ft 10 in (1.78 m)	Fr	Christian Academy	Knoxville, TN
G	24	Kindred Wesemann	5 ft 6 in (1.68 m)	Jr	Pleasant Hill	Pleasant Hill, MO
G	50	Shaelyn Martin	6 ft 0 in (1.83 m)	So	Salinas Central	Salina, KS
C	52	Cheyenne Hooper	6 ft 6 in (1.98 m)	Fr	Christian Academy	Knoxville, TN

Head coach

- Jeff Mittie (Missouri Western)

Assistant coach(es)

- Brian Ostermann (UW–La Crosse)
- Ebony Gilliam (TCU)
- Jacie Hoyt-Capra (Wichita State)

Legend

- (C) Team captain
- (S) Suspended
- (I) Ineligible
- (W) Walk-on
- Injured
- Current redshirt

Roster
Last update: 2015-07-10

== Rankings ==
2015–16 NCAA Division I women's basketball rankings

Regular season polls
Poll	Pre- Season	Week 2	Week 3	Week 4	Week 5	Week 6	Week 7	Week 8	Week 9	Week 10	Week 11	Week 12	Week 13	Week 14	Week 15	Week 16	Week 17	Week 18	Final
AP																			
Coaches																			

Legend
	Increase in ranking
	Decrease in ranking
	Not ranked previous week
(RV)	Received Votes

== Schedule and results ==
Date time, TV	Rank^{#}	Opponent^{#}	Result	Record	Site (attendance) city, state
Exhibition
11/02/2015*; 7:00 pm, Cox Kansas		Washburn	W 78–45		Bramlage Coliseum (3,910); Manhattan, KS
11/09/2015*; 7:00 pm, Cox Kansas		Pittsburg State	W 58–50		Bramlage Coliseum (3,885); Manhattan, KS
Non-conference regular season
11/13/2015*; 7:00 pm		at Tulsa	W 75–67	1–0	Reynolds Center (1,433); Tulsa, OK
11/16/2015*; 5:30 pm, FCS Atlantic		Abilene Christian	W 76–45	2–0	Bramlage Coliseum (3,784); Manhattan, KS
11/19/2015*; 7:00 pm, FCS Central		South Dakota	W 84–81 ^{OT}	3–0	Bramlage Coliseum (3,874); Manhattan, KS
11/23/2015*; 6:00 pm, SNY		at No. 1 Connecticut	L 57–97	3–1	Gampel Pavilion (8,369); Storrs, CT
11/25/2015*; 2:00 pm, K-StateHD.TV		Southern	W 59–47	4–1	Bramlage Coliseum (4,028); Manhattan, KS
12/03/2015*; 7:00 pm, FCS Central		Texas–Arlington	W 61–41	5–1	Bramlage Coliseum (3,909); Manhattan, KS
12/05/2015*; 2:00 pm		at Chicago State	W 63–54	6–1	Emil and Patricia Jones Convocation Center (417); Chicago, IL
12/07/2015*; 7:00 pm, Cox Kansas		Texas–Rio Grande Valley	W 61–43	7–1	Bramlage Coliseum (3,872); Manhattan, KS
12/13/2015*; 4:00 pm, ESPN3		Florida Atlantic	W 102–53	8–1	Bramlage Coliseum (3,905); Manhattan, KS
12/19/2015*; 7:00 pm, ESPN3		Sam Houston State	W 78–50	9–1	Bramlage Coliseum (3,955); Manhattan, KS
12/21/2015*; 7:00 pm, ESPN3		Western Illinois	W 84–45	10–1	Bramlage Coliseum (4,010); Manhattan, KS
Big 12 regular season
12/30/2015; 7:00 pm, ESPN3		Iowa State	L 79–84	10–2 (0–1)	Bramlage Coliseum (4,960); Manhattan, KS
01/02/2016; 1:00 pm, FSSW		at TCU	L 73–87	10–3 (0–2)	Schollmaier Arena (1,698); Fort Worth, TX
01/06/2016; 7:00 pm, FCS Central		West Virginia	L 53–72	10–4 (0–3)	Bramlage Coliseum (3,937); Manhattan, KS
01/10/2016; 1:00 pm		at No. 17 Oklahoma	L 58–68	10–5 (0–4)	Lloyd Noble Center (4,637); Norman, OK
01/13/2016; 7:00 pm, ESPN3		Oklahoma State	W 47–44	11–5 (1–4)	Bramlage Coliseum (4,441); Manhattan, KS
01/16/2016; 7:00 pm, Cox Kansas		TCU	W 59–48	12–5 (2–4)	Bramlage Coliseum (7,525); Manhattan, KS
01/20/2016; 7:00 pm, FSN		at Kansas; Sunflower Showdown	W 59–46	13–5 (3–4)	Allen Fieldhouse (2,529); Lawrence, KS
01/24/2016; 2:00 pm, FSSW+		at Texas Tech	W 65–53	14–5 (4–4)	United Supermarkets Arena (3,528); Lubbock, TX
01/30/2016; 7:00 pm, ESPN3		No. 6 Texas	L 51–66	14–6 (4–5)	Bramlage Coliseum (4,846); Manhattan, KS
02/03/2016; 7:00 pm, FSSW+		at No. 4 Baylor	L 52–87	14–7 (4–6)	Ferrell Center (5,752); Waco, TX
02/06/2016; 12:00 pm		at West Virginia	L 44–64	14–8 (4–7)	WVU Coliseum (4,328); Morgantown, WV
02/09/2016; 7:00 pm, FCS Central		No. 21 Oklahoma	W 87–71	15–8 (5–7)	Bramlage Coliseum (3,954); Manhattan, KS
02/13/2016; 7:00 pm, Cox Kansas		Kansas; Sunflower Showdown	W 81–67	16–8 (6–7)	Bramlage Coliseum (5,284); Manhattan, KS
02/17/2016; 7:00 pm, LHN		at No. 4 Texas	L 51–58	16–9 (6–8)	Frank Erwin Center (3,036); Austin, TX
02/21/2016; 2:00 pm, FCS Central		Texas Tech	W 65–53	17–9 (7–8)	Bramlage Coliseum (4,899); Manhattan, KS
02/24/2016; 7:00 pm		at Iowa State	W 68–53	18–9 (8–8)	Hilton Coliseum (10,335); Ames, IA
02/27/2016; 3:30 pm, FS2		No. 4 Baylor	L 52–63	18–10 (8–9)	Bramlage Coliseum (5,451); Manhattan, KS
02/29/2016; 8:00 pm		at Oklahoma State	L 51–59	18–11 (8–10)	Gallagher-Iba Arena (1,754); Stillwater, OK
Big 12 Women's Tournament
03/05/2016; 8:30 pm, FSN		vs. No. 22 West Virginia; Quarterfinals	L 65–74	18–12	Chesapeake Energy Arena (3,863); Oklahoma City, OK
NCAA Women's Tournament
03/18/2016*; 4:00 pm, ESPN2	(9 SF)	vs. (8 SF) George Washington; First Round	W 56–51	19–12	Colonial Life Arena; Columbia, SC
03/20/2016*; 6:00 pm, ESPN	(9 SF)	at (1 SF) No. 3 South Carolina; Second Round	L 47–73	19–13	Colonial Life Arena (10,048); Columbia, SC
*Non-conference game. ^{#}Rankings from AP Poll / Coaches' Poll. (#) Tournament seedings in parentheses. SF=Sioux Falls Region. All times are in Central Time.

== See also ==
- 2015–16 Kansas State Wildcats men's basketball team
