= 2015–16 Iowa State Cyclones women's basketball team =

Intercollegiate basketball season

2015–16 Iowa State Cyclones women's basketball
- Conference: Big 12 Conference
- Record: 13–17 (5–13 Big 12)
- Head coach: Bill Fennelly (21st season)
- Assistant coaches: Jodi Steyer; Billy Fennelly; Latoja Schaben
- Home arena: Hilton Coliseum

2015–16 Big 12 Conference women's basketball standings
	Conf.				Overall
Team	W		L	PCT	W		L	PCT
No. 4 Baylor †	17	–	1	.944	36	–	2	.947
No. 6 Texas	15	–	3	.833	31	–	5	.861
No. 22 West Virginia	12	–	6	.667	25	–	10	.714
Oklahoma State	11	–	7	.611	21	–	10	.677
No. 24 Oklahoma	11	–	7	.611	22	–	11	.667
Kansas State	8	–	10	.444	19	–	13	.594
TCU	8	–	10	.444	18	–	15	.545
Iowa State	5	–	13	.278	13	–	17	.433
Texas Tech	3	–	15	.167	13	–	18	.419
Kansas	0	–	18	.000	6	–	25	.194
† 2016 Big 12 Tournament winner Rankings from AP poll

The 2015–16 Iowa State Cyclones women's basketball team represented Iowa State University in the 2015–16 NCAA Division I women's basketball season. This was head coach Bill Fennelly's 21st season at Iowa State. The Cyclones were members of the Big 12 Conference and played their home games at the Hilton Coliseum. They finished the season 13–17, 5–13 in Big 12 play to finish in eighth place. They lost in the first round of the Big 12 women's tournament to Texas Tech.

== Radio ==
All Cyclones games were carried on the Iowa State Cyclone Radio Network. Not all affiliates carried women's basketball, and some affiliates only carried select games. To learn which stations will carry games, please visit the Cyclone Radio Network affiliate list linked here. Brent Blum and Molly Parrott called all the action for the Cyclone Radio Network and for games on Cyclones.tv.

== Roster ==
2015–16 Iowa State Cyclones women's basketball team
Players
Coaches

Pos.	#	Name	Height	Year	Previous school	Hometown
G	3	Emily Durr	6 ft 0 in (1.83 m)	So	Notre Dame	Utica, NY
G	11	Jadda Buckley	5 ft 8 in (1.73 m)	RS So	Mason City	Mason City, IA
G	12	Seanna Johnson	5 ft 10 in (1.78 m)	Jr	DeLaSalle	Brooklyn Park, MN
G	15	Nicole "Kidd" Blaskowsky	5 ft 7 in (1.7 m)	Sr	Austin	Sugar Land, TX
G	21	Bridget Carleton	6 ft 1 in (1.85 m)	Fr	John McGregor Secondary	Chatham, ON
G	22	TeeTee Starks	5 ft 9 in (1.75 m)	Fr	Hopkins	Brooklyn Park, MN
G	25	Lexi Albrecht	5 ft 10 in (1.78 m)	Jr	Carroll Kuemper	Carroll, IA
F	30	Claire Ricketts	6 ft 3 in (1.91 m)	RS Fr	John Paul II	Parker, TX
F	32	Meredith Burkhall	6 ft 3 in (1.91 m)	Fr	Roosevelt	Urbandle, IA
F/C	34	Madison Baier	6 ft 4 in (1.93 m)	Sr	South Tama	Tama, IA
F	35	Jordan Jensen	6 ft 2 in (1.88 m)	Jr	Mountain View	Gilbert, AZ
C	44	Bryanna Fernstrom	6 ft 5 in (1.96 m)	So	Chisago Lakes	Center City, MN

Head coach

- Bill Fennelly (William Penn)

Assistant coach(es)

- Jodi Steyer (Colorado State)
- Billy Fennelly (Iowa State)
- Latoja Schaben (Toledo)

Legend

- (C) Team captain
- (S) Suspended
- (I) Ineligible
- (W) Walk-on
- Injured
- Current redshirt

Roster

== Schedule and results ==
Date time, TV	Rank^{#}	Opponent^{#}	Result	Record	Site (attendance) city, state
Exhibition
11/05/2015*; 7:00 pm, Cyclones.tv		Midwestern State	W 79–36		Hilton Coliseum (9,910); Ames, IA
11/08/2015*; 2:00 pm, Cyclones.tv		Concordia–St. Paul	W 77–51		Hilton Coliseum (9,998); Ames, IA
Non-conference regular season
11/13/2015*; 7:00 pm, Cyclones.tv		Hampton	W 95–59	1–0	Hilton Coliseum (10,057); Ames, IA
11/15/2015*; 2:05 pm, ESPN3		at Drake	L 70–74	1–1	Knapp Center (4,251); Des Moines, IA
11/22/2015*; 2:00 pm, Cyclones.tv		New Orleans			Hilton Coliseum; Ames, IA
11/26/2015*; 10:00 am		vs. Texas State; Women's Cancún Challenge Mayan Division	W 83–61	2–1	Hard Rock Hotel Riviera Maya (133); Cancún, Mexico
11/27/2015*; 12:30 pm		vs. No. 15 Duke; Women's Cancún Challenge Mayan Division	L 48–86	2–2	Hard Rock Hotel Riviera Maya (133); Cancún, Mexico
11/28/2015*; 10:00 am		vs. Idaho; Women's Cancún Challenge Mayan Division	L 65–97	2–3	Hard Rock Hotel Riviera Maya (133); Cancún, Mexico
12/02/2015*; 7:00 pm, ESPN3		at Northern Iowa	W 84–75	3–3	McLeod Center (2,095); Cedar Falls, IA
12/06/2015*; 2:00 pm, Cyclones.tv		Southern	W 86–46	4–3	Hilton Coliseum (10,554); Ames, IA
12/11/2015*; 7:00 pm, Cyclones.tv		No. 23 Iowa; Iowa Corn Cy-Hawk Series	W 69–66	5–3	Hilton Coliseum (11,373); Ames, IA
12/13/2015*; 12:00 pm, Cyclones.tv		Arkansas–Pine Bluff	W 70–41	6–3	Hilton Coliseum (10,156); Ames, IA
12/20/2015*; 2:00 pm, Cyclones.tv		Alcorn State	W 91–41	7–3	Hilton Coliseum (6,651); Ames, IA
12/22/2015*; 2:00 pm, Cyclones.tv		Northern Arizona	W 79–63	8–3	Hilton Coliseum (7,606); Ames, IA
Big 12 Conference Season
12/30/2015; 7:00 pm, ESPN3		at Kansas State	W 84–79	9–3 (1–0)	Bramlage Coliseum (4,960); Manhattan, KS
01/02/2016; 2:00 pm, Cyclones.tv		Oklahoma State	W 49–42	10–3 (2–0)	Hilton Coliseum (8,429); Ames, IA
01/06/2016; 7:00 pm		at No. 4 Texas	L 54–75	10–4 (2–1)	Frank Erwin Center (2,836); Austin, TX
01/09/2016; 7:00 pm, Cyclones.tv		Kansas	W 65–49	11–4 (3–1)	Hilton Coliseum (7,471); Ames, IA
01/17/2016; 2:00 pm		at Texas Tech	L 66–69 ^{OT}	11–5 (3–2)	United Supermarkets Arena (4,108); Lubbock, TX
01/20/2016; 7:00 pm		at Oklahoma State	L 76–79 ^{OT}	11–6 (3–3)	Gallagher-Iba Arena (1,926); Stillwater, OK
01/23/2016; 12:30 pm, FS1		No. 4 Baylor	L 61–77	11–7 (3–4)	Hilton Coliseum (11,587); Ames, IA
01/27/2016; 7:00 pm		TCU	L 62–72	11–8 (3–5)	Hilton Coliseum (9,983); Ames, IA
01/30/2016; 1:00 pm, FSN		No. 21 Oklahoma	L 71–77	11–9 (3–6)	Hilton Coliseum (11,249); Ames, IA
02/02/2016; 7:00 pm, ESPN3		at Kansas	W 63–53	12–9 (4–6)	Allen Fieldhouse (2,483); Lawrence, KS
02/06/2016; 1:30 pm, FS2		No. 6 Texas	L 49–65	12–10 (4–7)	Hilton Coliseum (11,261); Ames, IA
02/10/2016; 6:00 pm		at No. 24 West Virginia	L 47–57	12–11 (4–8)	WVU Coliseum (1,317); Morgantown, WV
02/13/2016; 1:00 pm, FSSW		at TCU	L 69–79	12–12 (4–9)	Schollmaier Arena (1,812); Fort Worth, TX
02/17/2016; 7:00 pm, Cyclones.tv		Texas Tech	W 77–48	13–12 (5–9)	Hilton Coliseum (10,568); Ames, IA
02/20/2016; 2:00 pm		at No. 4 Baylor	L 41–78	13–13 (5–10)	Ferrell Center (7,216); Waco, TX
02/24/2016; 7:00 pm, Cyclones.tv		Kansas State	L 53–68	13–14 (5–11)	Hilton Coliseum (10,335); Ames, IA
02/27/2016; 2:00 pm		at No. 21 Oklahoma	L 54–85	13–15 (5–12)	Lloyd Noble Center (5,192); Norman, OK
03/01/2016; 7:00 pm, Cyclones.tv		No. 22 West Virginia	L 57–82	13–16 (5–13)	Hilton Coliseum (10,213); Ames, IA
Big 12 women's basketball tournament
03/04/2016; 6:00 pm, FCS		vs. Texas Tech; First Round	L 84–89	13–17	Chesapeake Energy Arena; Oklahoma City, OK
*Non-conference game. ^{#}Rankings from AP Poll. (#) Tournament seedings in parentheses. All times are in Central Time.

== Rankings ==
2015–16 NCAA Division I women's basketball rankings

Regular season polls
Poll	Pre- Season	Week 2	Week 3	Week 4	Week 5	Week 6	Week 7	Week 8	Week 9	Week 10	Week 11	Week 12	Week 13	Week 14	Week 15	Week 16	Week 17	Week 18	Final
AP	RV	NR	NR	NR	NR	NR	NR	NR	RV	NR	NR	NR	NR	NR	NR	NR	NR	NR	NR
Coaches	RV	NR	NR	NR	NR	NR	NR	NR	NR	NR	NR	NR	NR	NR	NR	NR	NR	NR	NR

Legend
	Increase in ranking
	Decrease in ranking
	Not ranked previous week
(RV)	Received Votes

== See also ==
- 2015–16 Iowa State Cyclones men's basketball team
