= 2015–16 Kansas Jayhawks women's basketball team =

Intercollegiate basketball season

2015–16 Kansas Jayhawks women's basketball
- Conference: Big 12 Conference
- Record: 6–25 (0–18 Big 12)
- Head coach: Brandon Schneider (1st season)
- Assistant coaches: A'Quonesia Franklin; Katie O'Connor; Damitria Buchanan
- Home arena: Allen Fieldhouse

2015–16 Big 12 Conference women's basketball standings
	Conf.				Overall
Team	W		L	PCT	W		L	PCT
No. 4 Baylor †	17	–	1	.944	36	–	2	.947
No. 6 Texas	15	–	3	.833	31	–	5	.861
No. 22 West Virginia	12	–	6	.667	25	–	10	.714
Oklahoma State	11	–	7	.611	21	–	10	.677
No. 24 Oklahoma	11	–	7	.611	22	–	11	.667
Kansas State	8	–	10	.444	19	–	13	.594
TCU	8	–	10	.444	18	–	15	.545
Iowa State	5	–	13	.278	13	–	17	.433
Texas Tech	3	–	15	.167	13	–	18	.419
Kansas	0	–	18	.000	6	–	25	.194
† 2016 Big 12 Tournament winner Rankings from AP poll

The 2015–16 Kansas Jayhawks women's basketball team represented the University of Kansas in the 2015–16 NCAA Division I women's basketball season. The Jayhawks were led by first year head coach Brandon Schneider. They played their home games at Allen Fieldhouse in Lawrence, Kansas and were members of the Big 12 Conference. They finished the season 6–25, 0–18 in Big 12 play to finish in last place. They advanced to the quarterfinals of the Big 12 women's tournament, where they lost to Texas.

== Roster ==
2015–16 Kansas Jayhawks women's basketball team
Players
Coaches

Pos.	#	Name	Height	Year	Previous school	Hometown
C	1	Chelsea Lott	6 ft 3 in (1.91 m)	Fr	Fort Bend Hightower	Fresno, TX
G	2	McKenzie Calvert	5 ft 9 in (1.75 m)	So	Byron P. Steele; USC	Schertz, TX
G	3	Lauren Alridge	5 ft 7 in (1.7 m)	So	Marshfield	Marshfield, MO
F	4	Jada Brown	6 ft 0 in (1.83 m)	Jr	Centennial	Las Vegas, NV
G	12	Timeka O'Neal	5 ft 4 in (1.63 m)	RS Jr	Raytown	Raytown, MO
F	13	Lorraine Enabulele	6 ft 0 in (1.83 m)	So	Notre Dame Secondary School	Ajax, ON
G	15	Aisia Robertson	5 ft 7 in (1.7 m)	Fr	Bishop O'Dowd	San Francisco, CA
G	20	Jayde Christopher	5 ft 8 in (1.73 m)	Fr	Cleveland	Federal Way, WA
G	21	Sydney Benoit	5 ft 10 in (1.78 m)	Jr	Smith Center; Hutchinson CC	Smith Center, KS
G	22	Chayla Cheadle	5 ft 11 in (1.8 m)	So	Rock Bridge HS	Columbia, MO
F	25	Caelynn Manning-Allen	6 ft 4 in (1.93 m)	Jr	Curie	Chicago, IL
G	30	Jessica Washington	5 ft 8 in (1.73 m)	Jr	Jenks; North Carolina	Tulsa, OK
G	33	Kylee Kopatich	5 ft 10 in (1.78 m)	Fr	Olathe South	Olathe, KS
G	44	Kelea Dennis	6 ft 1 in (1.85 m)	Fr	Piedmont	Oakland, CA
F	55	Tyler Johnson	6 ft 2 in (1.88 m)	Fr	Leavenworth	Leavenworth, KS

Head coach

- Brandon Schneider (Wayland Baptist)

Assistant coach(es)

- A'Quonesia Franklin (Texas A&M)
- Katie O'Connor (Virginia Tech)
- Steve Wallace (Texas A&M)

Legend

- (C) Team captain
- (S) Suspended
- (I) Ineligible
- (W) Walk-on
- Injured
- Current redshirt

Roster
Last update: 2015-10-14

== Schedule and results ==
Date time, TV	Rank^{#}	Opponent^{#}	Result	Record	Site (attendance) city, state
Exhibition
11/01/2015*; 2:00 pm, JTV/ESPN3		Pittsburg State	W 80–54		Allen Fieldhouse (2,378); Lawrence, KS
11/08/2015*; 2:00 pm, JTV/ESPN3		Emporia State	W 68–57		Allen Fieldhouse (2,871); Lawrence, KS
Non-conference regular season
11/15/2015*; 2:00 pm, JTV/ESPN3		Texas Southern	W 72–65	1–0	Allen Fieldhouse (2,077); Lawrence, KS
11/19/2015*; 7:00 pm, JTV/ESPN3		Memphis	W 72–63	2–0	Allen Fieldhouse (1,823); Lawrence, KS
11/23/2015*; 1:00 pm		at Arizona	L 52–67	2–1	McKale Center (6,652); Tucson, AZ
11/27/2015*; 7:30 pm		vs. Northern Illinois; SMU Thanksgiving Classic semifinals	W 66–58	3–1	Moody Coliseum (718); Dallas, TX
11/28/2015*; 5:00 pm		at SMU; SMU Thanksgiving Classic championship	L 64–73	3–2	Mooody Coliseum (782); Dallas, TX
12/02/2015*; 7:00 pm, JTV/ESPN3		Creighton	W 67–54	4–2	Allen Fieldhouse (1,753); Lawrence, KS
12/06/2015*; 2:00 pm, JTV/ESPN3		St. John's	L 71–86	4–3	Allen Fieldhouse (2,476); Lawrence, KS
12/10/2015*; 7:00 pm, JTV/ESPN3		UMKC	L 44–47	4–4	Allen Fieldhouse (1,736); Lawrence, KS
12/13/2015*; 2:00 pm, JTV/ESPN3		Navy	W 61–54 ^{OT}	5–4	Allen Fieldhouse (2,032); Lawrence, KS
12/20/2015*; 7:00 pm, JTV/ESPN3		Washington State	L 53–66	5–5	Allen Fieldhouse (2,184); Lawrence, KS
12/22/2015*; 7:00 pm, JTV/ESPN3		Oral Roberts	L 63–70	5–6	Allen Fieldhouse (2,176); Lawrence, KS
Big 12 regular season
12/30/2015; 7:00 pm		at No. 18 Oklahoma	L 44–67	5–7 (0–1)	Lloyd Noble Center (5,328); Norman, OK
01/03/2016; 2:00 pm, JTV/ESPN3		West Virginia	L 45–65	5–8 (0–2)	Allen Fieldhouse (2,758); Lawrence, KS
01/06/2016; 7:00 pm, JTV/ESPN3		No. 6 Baylor	L 40–58	5–9 (0–3)	Allen Fieldhouse (2,109); Lawrence, KS
01/09/2016; 7:00 pm		at Iowa State	L 49–65	5–10 (0–4)	Hilton Coliseum (7,471); Ames, IA
01/13/2016; 2:00 pm, JTV/ESPN3		No. 4 Texas	L 38–75	5–11 (0–5)	Allen Fieldhouse (1,903); Lawrence, KS
01/16/2016; 6:00 pm		at West Virginia	L 35–72	5–12 (0–6)	WVU Coliseum (4,006); Morgantown, WV
01/20/2016; 7:00 pm, FSN		Kansas State; Sunflower Showdown	L 46–59	5–13 (0–7)	Allen Fieldhouse (2,529); Lawrence, KS
01/24/2016; 2:00 pm, JTV/ESPN3		Oklahoma State	L 46–74	5–14 (0–8)	Allen Fieldhouse (4,132); Lawrence, KS
01/27/2016; 7:00 pm, LHN		at No. 6 Texas	L 46–70	5–15 (0–9)	Frank Erwin Center (3,126); Austin, TX
01/30/2016; 5:00 pm, FSSW+		at Texas Tech	L 44–54	5–16 (0–10)	United Supermarkets Arena (3,671); Lubbock, TX
02/02/2016; 7:00 pm, JTV/ESPN3		Iowa State	L 53–63	5–17 (0–11)	Allen Fieldhouse (2,483); Lawrence, KS
02/06/2016; 2:00 pm		at No. 4 Baylor	L 49–81	5–18 (0–12)	Ferrell Center (6,709); Waco, TX
02/13/2016; 7:00 pm		at Kansas State; Sunflower Showdown	L 67–81	5–19 (0–13)	Bramlage Coliseum (5,284); Manhattan, KS
02/17/2016; 7:00 pm, JTV/ESPN3		TCU	L 44–70	5–20 (0–14)	Allen Fieldhouse (2,579); Lawrence, KS
02/20/2015; 2:00 pm, JTV/ESPN3		No. 20 Oklahoma	L 66–72	5–21 (0–15)	Allen Fieldhouse (4,737); Lawrence, KS
02/24/2016; 7:00 pm		at No. 22 Oklahoma State	L 49–71	5–22 (0–16)	Gallagher-Iba Arena (3,725); Stillwater, OK
02/27/2016; 7:00 pm, JTV/ESPN3		Texas Tech	L 58–69	5–23 (0–17)	Allen Fieldhouse (3,432); Lawrence, KS
02/29/2016; 6:00 pm, FSN		at TCU	L 52–55	5–24 (0–18)	Schollmaier Arena (2,194); Fort Worth, TX
Big 12 Women's Tournament
03/04/2016; 8:30 pm, FCS		vs. TCU; First Round	W 81–64	6–24	Chesapeake Energy Arena (3,832); Oklahoma City, OK
03/05/2016; 6:00 pm, FSN		vs. No. 6 Texas; Quarterfinals	L 50–66	6–25	Chesapeake Energy Arena; Oklahoma City, OK
*Non-conference game. ^{#}Rankings from AP Poll / Coaches' Poll. (#) Tournament seedings in parentheses. All times are in Central Time.

x- All JTV games will air on Metro Sports, ESPN3 and local affiliates.

== See also ==
- 2015–16 Kansas Jayhawks men's basketball team
