= 2016 Big 12 Conference women's basketball tournament =

- Classification: Division I
- Season: 2015–16
- Teams: 10
- Site: Chesapeake Energy Arena; Oklahoma City, Oklahoma
- Champions: Baylor (8th title)
- Winning coach: Kim Mulkey (8th title)
- MVP: Alexis Jones (Baylor)
- Attendance: 20,672 (overall); 3,859 (championship)
- Television: FCS-Central, FSN, FS1

2015–16 Big 12 Conference women's basketball standings
	Conf.				Overall
Team	W		L	PCT	W		L	PCT
No. 4 Baylor †	17	–	1	.944	36	–	2	.947
No. 6 Texas	15	–	3	.833	31	–	5	.861
No. 22 West Virginia	12	–	6	.667	25	–	10	.714
Oklahoma State	11	–	7	.611	21	–	10	.677
No. 24 Oklahoma	11	–	7	.611	22	–	11	.667
Kansas State	8	–	10	.444	19	–	13	.594
TCU	8	–	10	.444	18	–	15	.545
Iowa State	5	–	13	.278	13	–	17	.433
Texas Tech	3	–	15	.167	13	–	18	.419
Kansas	0	–	18	.000	6	–	25	.194
† 2016 Big 12 Tournament winner Rankings from AP poll

The 2016 Big 12 Conference women's basketball tournament was the postseason women's basketball tournament for the Big 12 Conference, held March 4–7 in Oklahoma City at Chesapeake Energy Arena. Baylor won their 8th Big 12 tournament title to earn an automatic trip to the NCAA women's tournament.

== Seeds ==
2016 Big 12 Conference women's basketball tournament seeds
Seed	School	Conf.	Over.	Tiebreaker
1	‡ - Baylor	17–1	30–1	
2	# - Texas	15–3	26–3	
3	# - West Virginia	12–6	23–8	
4	# - Oklahoma State	11–7	21–8	2–0 vs. OKLA
5	# - Oklahoma	11–7	20–9	0–2 vs. OKST
6	# - Kansas State	8–10	18–11	1–1 vs. TCU, 1–1 vs. OKLA
7	TCU	8–10	16–13	1–1 vs. K-STATE, 0–2 vs. OKLA
8	Iowa State	5–13	13–16	
9	Texas Tech	3–15	12–17	
10	Kansas	0–18	5–24	
‡ – Big 12 Conference regular season champions, and tournament No. 1 seed. # - Received a single-bye in the conference tournament. Overall records include all games played in the Big 12 Conference tournament.

== Schedule ==
Session	Game	Time	Matchup	Television	Attendance
First round – Friday, March 4
1	1	6:02 pm	#9 Texas Tech 89 vs #8 Iowa State 84	FCS-Central	3,832
1	2	8:32 pm	#10 Kansas 81 vs #7 TCU 64	FCS-Central	3,832
Quarterfinals – Saturday, March 5
2	3	11:02 am	#5 Oklahoma 61 vs #4 Oklahoma State 43	FSN	4,527
2	4	1:34 pm	#1 Baylor 82 vs #9 Texas Tech 51	FSN	4,527
3	5	6:02 pm	#2 Texas 66 vs #10 Kansas 50	FSN	3,863
3	6	8:35 pm	#3 West Virginia 74 vs #6 Kansas State 65	FSN	3,863
Semifinals – Sunday, March 6
4	7	1:32 pm	#1 Baylor 84 vs #5 Oklahoma 57	FS1	4,591
4	8	4:02 pm	#2 Texas 67 vs #3 West Virginia 51	FS1	4,591
Final – Monday, March 7
5	9	8:02 pm	#1 Baylor 79 vs #2 Texas 63	FS1	3,859
Game times in CT. #-Rankings denote tournament seed

== Bracket ==
First round Friday, March 4 FCS
8	Iowa State	84
9	Texas Tech	89
7	TCU	64
10	Kansas	81

Quarterfinals; Saturday, March 5 FSN
1	Baylor	82
9	Texas Tech	51
4	Oklahoma State	43
5	Oklahoma	61
2	Texas	66
10	Kansas	50
3	West Virginia	74
6	Kansas State	65

Semifinals; Sunday, March 6 FS1
1	Baylor	84
5	Oklahoma	57
2	Texas	67
3	West Virginia	51

Championship game Monday, March 7 FS1
1	Baylor	79
2	Texas	63

== All-Tournament team ==
Most Outstanding Player – Alexis Jones, Baylor

Player	Team
Alexis Jones	Baylor
Nina Davis	Baylor
Niya Johnson	Baylor
Brooke McCarty	Texas
Celina Rodrigo	Texas

== See also ==
- 2016 Big 12 Conference men's basketball tournament
- 2016 NCAA Women's Division I Basketball Tournament
- 2015–16 NCAA Division I women's basketball rankings
