= 2015–16 TCU Horned Frogs women's basketball team =

Intercollegiate basketball season

2015–16 TCU Horned Frogs women's basketball

WNIT, Third Round
- Conference: Big 12 Conference
- Record: 18–15 (8–10 Big 12)
- Head coach: Raegan Pebley (2nd season)
- Assistant coaches: Hanna Howard; Edwina Brown; Aaron Kallhoff
- Home arena: Schollmaier Arena

2015–16 Big 12 Conference women's basketball standings
	Conf.				Overall
Team	W		L	PCT	W		L	PCT
No. 4 Baylor †	17	–	1	.944	36	–	2	.947
No. 6 Texas	15	–	3	.833	31	–	5	.861
No. 22 West Virginia	12	–	6	.667	25	–	10	.714
Oklahoma State	11	–	7	.611	21	–	10	.677
No. 24 Oklahoma	11	–	7	.611	22	–	11	.667
Kansas State	8	–	10	.444	19	–	13	.594
TCU	8	–	10	.444	18	–	15	.545
Iowa State	5	–	13	.278	13	–	17	.433
Texas Tech	3	–	15	.167	13	–	18	.419
Kansas	0	–	18	.000	6	–	25	.194
† 2016 Big 12 Tournament winner Rankings from AP poll

The 2015–16 TCU Horned Frogs women's basketball team represented Texas Christian University in the 2015–16 NCAA Division I women's basketball season. The 2015–16 season is head coach Raegan Pebley's second season at TCU. The Horned Frogs were members of the Big 12 Conference and played their home games in Schollmaier Arena since its re-opening on December 20, 2015, following a $72 million renovation. Prior to the Arena's opening, the Horned Frogs played early-season non-conference games in the TCU University Recreation Center.

The Horned Frogs compiled an 8–3 non-conference record before opening Big 12 Conference play on December 30, 2015, at Texas Tech. As a 10-team league, the Big 12 plays an 18-game, double-round robin conference schedule, with each team facing every other team twice, once at home and once on the road.

They finished the season 18–15, 8–10 in Big 12 play to finish in a tie for sixth place. They lost in the first round of the Big 12 women's tournament to Kansas. They received an at-large bid to the Women's National Invitation Tournament, where they defeated Texas–Rio Grande and Eastern Michigan in the first and second rounds before losing to UTEP in the third round.

== Roster ==
2015–16 TCU Horned Frogs women's basketball team
Players
Coaches

Pos.	#	Name	Height	Year	Previous school	Hometown
F	00	Amy Okonkwo (I) (redshirt)	6 ft 2 in (1.88 m)	So	Etiwanda; USC	Fontana, CA
G	1	Toree Thompson	5 ft 10 in (1.78 m)	So	Broken Arrow; Ole Miss	Broken Arrow, OK
G	3	Veja Hamilton	5 ft 10 in (1.78 m)	Sr	Klein Collins	Spring, TX
G	14	Zahna Medley	5 ft 6 in (1.68 m)	Sr	Springfield	Springfield, IL
G/F	15	Jada Butts	5 ft 8 in (1.73 m)	Jr	Lewisville	Lewisville, TX
F	21	Sydney Coleman	6 ft 1 in (1.85 m)	So	Cypress Ranch	Cypress, TX
C	22	Jordan Moore	6 ft 3 in (1.91 m)	Fr	Stony Point	Round Rock, TX
G	23	AJ Alix	5 ft 6 in (1.68 m)	RS So	Bellaire	Bellaire, TX
F	31	Destynee Hives-McCray	6 ft 0 in (1.83 m)	RS Sr	Martin; SMU	Arlington, TX
F	32	Caitlin Diaz	6 ft 1 in (1.85 m)	Sr	Tomball	Houston, TX
F	33	Adeola Akomolafe	6 ft 3 in (1.91 m)	Fr	El Dorado	El Paso, TX
F	42	Hattie Lankford	6 ft 0 in (1.83 m)	Fr	Bishop McGuinness	Oklahoma City, OK
C	44	Claire Ferguson	6 ft 3 in (1.91 m)	Fr	St. Thomas Aquinas	Olathe, KS
F	45	Aiche Ndao	6 ft 3 in (1.91 m)	Sr	Collin College	Mbour, Senegal
C	55	Carol Willie	6 ft 2 in (1.88 m)	Jr	Cypress	Houston, TX

Head coach

- Raegan Pebley (Colorado)

Assistant coach(es)

- Hanna Howard (Portland)
- Edwina Brown (Texas)
- Aaron Kallhoff (Bemidji State)

Legend

- (C) Team captain
- (S) Suspended
- (I) Ineligible
- (W) Walk-on
- Injured
- Current redshirt

Roster

== Schedule and results ==
Date time, TV	Rank^{#}	Opponent^{#}	Result	Record	Site (attendance) city, state
Exhibition
11/08/2015*; 2:00 pm		Texas Wesleyan	W 88–49		University Recreation Center; Fort Worth, TX
Non-Conference Games
11/13/2015*; 6:00 pm		Sam Houston State	W 85–59	1–0	University Recreation Center (1,663); Fort Worth, TX
11/15/2015*; 2:00 pm		New Orleans	W 85–36	2–0	University Recreation Center (1,657); Fort Worth, TX
11/18/2015*; 7:00 pm		at SMU	W 89–79	3–0	Moody Coliseum (745); Dallas, TX
11/21/2015*; 12:30 pm		at No. 12 Texas A&M	L 78–82	3–1	Reed Arena (4,013); College Station, TX
11/24/2015*; 7:00 pm		Prairie View A&M	W 69–60	4–1	University Recreation Center (1,480); Fort Worth, TX
11/28/2015*; 2:00 pm		Texas–Rio Grande Valley	W 71–67	5–1	University Recreation Center (1,543); Fort Worth, TX
12/01/2015*; 6:00 pm, FS2		at Butler	L 53–65	5–2	Hinkle Fieldhouse (791); Indianapolis, IN
12/05/2015*; 2:00 pm		Louisiana–Monroe	W 80–42	6–2	University Recreation Center (1,446); Fort Worth, TX
12/09/2015*; 7:00 pm		Stephen F. Austin	W 88–55	7–2	University Recreation Center (1,501); Fort Worth, TX
12/12/2015*; 11:00 am, FSN		No. 3 Notre Dame	L 72–88	7–3	University Recreation Center (1,628); Fort Worth, TX
12/20/2015*; 3:30 pm		Southern Utah	W 76–47	8–3	Schollmaier Arena (4,715); Fort Worth, TX
Conference Games
12/30/2015; 6:30 pm		at Texas Tech	W 78–69	9–3 (1–0)	United Supermarkets Arena (1,835); Lubbock, TX
01/02/2016; 1:00 pm, FSSW		Kansas State	W 87–73	10–3 (2–0)	Schollmaier Arena (1,698); Fort Worth, TX
01/06/2016; 6:00 pm, FSSW+		No. 17 Oklahoma	L 65–78	10–4 (2–1)	Schollmaier Arena (2,227); Fort Worth, TX
01/09/2016; 11:00 am, FSN		at No. 6 Baylor	L 55–72	10–5 (2–2)	Ferrell Center (7,081); Waco, TX
01/13/2016; 7:00 pm, FSSW+		Texas Tech	W 69–48	11–5 (3–2)	Schollmaier Arena (1,696); Fort Worth, TX
01/16/2016; 7:00 pm		at Kansas State	L 49–58	11–6 (3–3)	Bramlage Coliseum (7,525); Manhattan, KS
01/20/2016; 7:00 pm, FCS		No. 6 Texas	L 58–65	11–7 (3–4)	Schollmaier Arena (2,792); Fort Worth, TX
01/24/2016; 12:00 pm, FSSW		No. 25 West Virginia	L 84–97	11–8 (3–5)	Schollmaier Arena (2,087); Fort Worth, TX
01/27/2016; 7:00 pm		at Iowa State	W 72–62	12–8 (4–5)	Hilton Coliseum (9,983); Ames, IA
01/30/2016; 7:00 pm		at Oklahoma State	L 52–80	12–9 (4–6)	Gallagher-Iba Arena (3,609); Stillwater, OK
02/06/2016; 2:00 pm		at No. 20 Oklahoma	L 64–77	12–10 (4–7)	Lloyd Noble Center (4,322); Norman, OK
02/10/2016; 7:00 pm, FSSW		No. 4 Baylor	L 75–81	12–11 (4–8)	Schollmaier Arena (3,947); Fort Worth, TX
02/13/2016; 1:00 pm, FSSW		Iowa State	W 79–69	13–11 (5–8)	Schollmaier Arena (1,812); Fort Worth, TX
02/17/2016; 7:00 pm		at Kansas	W 70–44	14–11 (6–8)	Allen Fieldhouse (2,579); Lawrence, KS
02/20/2016; 1:00 pm, FSSW		No. 17 Oklahoma State	W 79–65	15–11 (7–8)	Schollmaier Arena (2,183); Fort Worth, TX
02/24/2016; 6:00 pm, RTPT		at West Virginia	L 72–83	15–12 (7–9)	WVU Coliseum (1,606); Morgantown, WV
02/27/2016; 7:00 pm, LHN		at No. 8 Texas	L 58–71	15–13 (7–10)	Frank Erwin Center (4,069); Austin, TX
02/29/2016; 6:00 pm, FSN		Kansas	W 55–52	16–13 (8–10)	Schollmaier Arena (2,194); Fort Worth, TX
Big 12 women's basketball tournament
03/04/2016; 8:30 pm, FCS		vs. Kansas; First Round	L 64–81	16–14	Chesapeake Energy Arena (3,832); Oklahoma City, OK
WNIT
03/17/2016*; 7:00 pm		Texas–Rio Grande Valley; First Round	W 97–73	17–14	Schollmaier Arena (910); Fort Worth, TX
03/19/2016*; 7:00 pm		Eastern Michigan; Second Round	W 85–81	18–14	Schollmaier Arena (963); Fort Worth, TX
03/24/2016*; 8:00 pm		at UTEP; Third Round	L 71–79	18–15	Don Haskins Center (7,024); El Paso, TX
*Non-conference game. ^{#}Rankings from AP Poll / Coaches' Poll. (#) Tournament seedings in parentheses. All times are in Central Time.

Schedule and results from GoFrogs.com

== Rankings ==
2015–16 NCAA Division I women's basketball rankings

Regular season polls
Poll	Pre- Season	Week 2	Week 3	Week 4	Week 5	Week 6	Week 7	Week 8	Week 9	Week 10	Week 11	Week 12	Week 13	Week 14	Week 15	Week 16	Week 17	Week 18	Week 19	Final
AP	NR	NR	NR	NR	NR	NR	NR	NR	RV	NR	NR	NR	NR	NR	NR	NR	NR	NR	NR	N/A
Coaches	NR	NR	NR	NR	NR	NR	NR	NR	NR	NR	NR	NR	NR	NR	NR	NR	NR	NR	NR	NR

Legend
	Increase in ranking
	Decrease in ranking
	Not ranked previous week
(RV)	Received Votes

== See also ==
- 2015–16 TCU Horned Frogs men's basketball team
