= 2015–16 Texas Tech Lady Raiders basketball team =

Intercollegiate basketball season

2015–16 Texas Tech Lady Raiders basketball
- Conference: Big 12 Conference
- Record: 13–18 (3–15 Big 12)
- Head coach: Candi Whitaker (3rd season)
- Assistant coaches: Matt Corkery; Brandi Poole; Ray Caldwell
- Home arena: United Supermarkets Arena

2015–16 Big 12 Conference women's basketball standings
	Conf.				Overall
Team	W		L	PCT	W		L	PCT
No. 4 Baylor †	17	–	1	.944	36	–	2	.947
No. 6 Texas	15	–	3	.833	31	–	5	.861
No. 22 West Virginia	12	–	6	.667	25	–	10	.714
Oklahoma State	11	–	7	.611	21	–	10	.677
No. 24 Oklahoma	11	–	7	.611	22	–	11	.667
Kansas State	8	–	10	.444	19	–	13	.594
TCU	8	–	10	.444	18	–	15	.545
Iowa State	5	–	13	.278	13	–	17	.433
Texas Tech	3	–	15	.167	13	–	18	.419
Kansas	0	–	18	.000	6	–	25	.194
† 2016 Big 12 Tournament winner Rankings from AP poll

The 2015–16 Texas Tech Lady Raiders basketball team represented Texas Tech University in the 2015–16 college basketball season. This was head coach Candi Whitaker's third season at Texas Tech. The Lady Raiders were members of the Big 12 Conference and played their home games at the United Supermarkets Arena. They finished the season 13–18, 3–15 in Big 12 play to finish in ninth place. They advanced to the quarterfinals of the Big 12 women's tournament, where they lost to Baylor.

== Rankings ==
Regular season polls
Poll	Pre- season	Week 2	Week 3	Week 4	Week 5	Week 6	Week 7	Week 8	Week 9	Week 10	Week 11	Week 12	Week 13	Week 14	Week 15	Week 16	Week 17	Week 18	Final
AP																			
Coaches																			

Legend
	Increase in ranking
	Decrease in ranking
	Not ranked previous week
(RV)	Received votes

== 2015–16 media ==
=== Television and radio information ===
Select Lady Raiders games were shown on FSN affiliates throughout the season, including FSSW, FSSW+, and FCS Atlantic, Central, and Pacific. All games were broadcast on the Lady Raiders Radio Network on either KLZK or KJTV.

== Roster ==
2015–16 Texas Tech Lady Raiders women's basketball team
Players
Coaches

Pos.	#	Name	Height	Year	Previous school	Hometown
F	00	Brielle Blaire	6 ft 2 in (1.88 m)	So	Terra Nova; Virginia Tech	Salisbury, NC
G	2	Ivonne Cook-Taylor	5 ft 8 in (1.73 m)	RS Jr	Terra Nova	San Francisco, CA
G	3	Minta Spears	5 ft 10 in (1.78 m)	RS So	Bullard; UCLA	Bullard, TX
G	4	Ryann Bowser	5 ft 8 in (1.73 m)	Sr	Holton; Highland CC	Holton, KS
G	5	Larryn Brooks	5 ft 6 in (1.68 m)	Jr	Madison Central; Indiana	Richmond, KY
G	11	Rayven Brooks	6 ft 0 in (1.83 m)	Sr	San Ramon Dougherty; Chipola College	Oakland, CA
C	12	Jada Terry	6 ft 4 in (1.93 m)	Jr	Cedar Hill; Texas A&M	Cedar Hill, TX
G	24	Japreece Dean	5 ft 6 in (1.68 m)	Fr	Vista Ridge	Cedar Park, TX
C	25	Leashja Grant	6 ft 2 in (1.88 m)	Jr	Sunrise Christian Academy; Trinity Valley CC	Nassau, BS
F	30	Zuri Sanders	6 ft 0 in (1.83 m)	Fr	Evansville Central	Evansville, IN
G/F	32	Dayo Olabode	6 ft 2 in (1.88 m)	So	Mansfield Timberview	Arlington, TX
F	34	Paige Parliament	6 ft 1 in (1.85 m)	RS Sr	Brock; Abilene Christian	Brock, TX
F	35	Jamie Roe	5 ft 10 in (1.78 m)	RS Sr	Tuba City; Central Arizona College	Tuba City, AZ
C	42	Ionna McKenzie	6 ft 2 in (1.88 m)	So	Dr. Phillips	Gotha, FL

Head coach

- Candi Whitaker (Valparaiso)

Assistant coach(es)

- Matt Corkery (West Texas A&M)
- Brett Schneider (West Virginia Wesleyan)
- Ray Caldwell (Chapman)

Legend

- (C) Team captain
- (S) Suspended
- (I) Ineligible
- (W) Walk-on
- Injured
- Current redshirt

Roster
Last update: 2015-10-14

== Schedule ==
Date time, TV	Rank^{#}	Opponent^{#}	Result	Record	Site (attendance) city, state
Exhibition
11/07/2015*; 2:00 pm		Eastern New Mexico	W 77–43		United Supermarkets Arena; Lubbock, TX
Non-conference regular season
11/13/2015*; 11:00 am		Niagara	W 79–45	1–0	United Supermarkets Arena (5,542); Lubbock, TX
11/21/2015*; 6:30 pm, FSSW+		Southeastern Louisiana	W 113–51	2–0	United Supermarkets Arena (3,623); Lubbock, TX
11/24/2015*; 6:30 pm		Idaho State	W 79–64	3–0	United Supermarkets Arena (2,917); Lubbock, TX
11/27/2015*; 6:30 pm		vs. Fordham; South Point Thanksgiving Shootout	W 62–48	4–0	South Point Arena; Enterprise, NV
11/28/2015*; 8:45 pm		vs. Washington; South Point Thanksgiving Shootout	L 73–77	4–1	South Point Arena; Enterprise, NV
12/02/2015*; 5:30 pm		Abilene Christian	W 71–65	5–1	United Supermarkets Arena (3,015); Lubbock, TX
12/09/2015*; 5:30 pm		Idaho	W 78–62	6–1	United Supermarkets Arena (3,194); Lubbock, TX
12/12/2015*; 4:00 pm, TheW.tv		at Santa Clara	L 70–75	6–2	Leavey Center (252); Santa Clara, CA
12/14/2015*; 6:30 pm		Incarnate Word	W 70–55	7–2	United Supermarkets Arena (3,096); Lubbock, TX
12/18/2015*; 6:30 pm		Grambling State	W 70–55	8–2	United Supermarkets Arena (3,707); Lubbock, TX
12/20/2015*; 2:00 pm, FSSW+		Arkansas–Pine Bluff	W 84–40	9–2	United Supermarkets Arena (3,398); Lubbock, TX
Big 12 regular season
12/30/2015; 6:30 pm, FSSW+		TCU	L 69–78	9–3 (0–1)	United Supermarkets Arena (1,835); Lubbock, TX
01/02/2016; 7:00 pm, LHN		at No. 5 Texas	L 62–86	9–4 (0–2)	Frank Erwin Center (3,668); Lubbock, TX
01/06/2016; 6:30 pm		Oklahoma State	L 46–69	9–5 (0–3)	United Supermarkets Arena (4,121); Lubbock, TX
01/09/2016; 6:00 pm		at West Virginia	L 57–79	9–6 (0–4)	WVU Coliseum (2,471); Morgantown, WV
01/13/2016; 7:00 pm, FSSW+		at TCU	L 48–69	9–7 (0–5)	Schollmaier Arena (1,696); Fort Worth, TX
01/17/2016; 2:00 pm, FSSW		Iowa State	W 69–66 ^{OT}	10–7 (1–5)	United Supermarkets Arena (4,108); Lubbock, TX
01/20/2016; 10:30 am, FSSW		at No. 19 Oklahoma	L 53–92	10–8 (1–6)	Lloyd Noble Center; Norman, OK
01/24/2016; 2:00 pm, FSSW+		Kansas State	L 53–65	10–9 (1–7)	United Supermarkets Arena (3,528); Lubbock, TX
01/27/2016; 7:00 pm, FSSW		at No. 4 Baylor	L 43–69	10–10 (1–8)	Ferrell Center (6,327); Waco, TX
01/30/2016; 5:00 pm, FSSW+		Kansas	W 54–44	11–10 (2–8)	United Supermarkets Arena (3,671); Lubbock, TX
02/02/2016; 6:00 pm, FS2		West Virginia	L 42–69	11–11 (2–9)	United Supermarkets Arena (2,842); Lubbock, TX
02/07/2016; 1:30 pm, FSN		at No. 25 Oklahoma State	L 57–70	11–12 (2–10)	Gallagher-Iba Arena (3,567); Stillwater, OK
02/13/2016; 2:00 pm		No. 4 Baylor	L 36–66	11–13 (2–11)	United Supermarkets Arena (6,565); Lubbock, TX
02/17/2016; 7:00 pm		at Iowa State	L 48–77	11–14 (2–12)	Hilton Coliseum (10,568); Ames, IA
02/21/2016; 2:00 pm, FCS		at Kansas State	L 53–65	11–15 (2–13)	Bramlage Coliseum (4,899); Manhattan, KS
02/24/2016; 6:30 pm, FSSW+		No. 8 Texas	L 55–76	11–16 (2–14)	United Supermarkets Arena (3,555); Lubbock, TX
02/27/2016; 7:00 pm, JTV/ESPN3		at Kansas	W 69–58	12–16 (3–14)	Allen Fieldhouse (3,432); Lawrence, KS
03/01/2016; 6:30 pm		No. 24 Oklahoma	L 60–70	12–17 (3–15)	United Supermarkets Arena (3,116); Lubbock, TX
Big 12 women's basketball tournament
03/04/2016; 6:00 pm, FCS		vs. Iowa State; First Round	W 89–84	13–17	Chesapeake Energy Arena; Oklahoma City, OK
03/05/2016; 1:30 pm, FSN		vs. No. 4 Baylor; Quarterfinals	L 51–82	13–18	Chesapeake Energy Arena (4,527); Oklahoma City, OK
*Non-conference game. ^{#}Rankings from AP Poll. (#) Tournament seedings in parentheses. All times are in Central Time.

== See also ==
- Texas Tech Lady Raiders basketball
- 2015–16 Texas Tech Red Raiders basketball team
