= 2015–16 West Virginia Mountaineers women's basketball team =

American college basketball season

2015–16 West Virginia Mountaineers women's basketball

NCAA Women's Tournament, second round
- Conference: Big 12 Conference

Ranking
- Coaches: No. 25
- AP: No. 23
- Record: 25–10 (12–6 Big 12)
- Head coach: Mike Carey (15th season)
- Assistant coaches: Chester Nichols; Lester Rowe; Sharrona Reaves
- Home arena: WVU Coliseum

2015–16 Big 12 Conference women's basketball standings
	Conf.				Overall
Team	W		L	PCT	W		L	PCT
No. 4 Baylor †	17	–	1	.944	36	–	2	.947
No. 6 Texas	15	–	3	.833	31	–	5	.861
No. 22 West Virginia	12	–	6	.667	25	–	10	.714
Oklahoma State	11	–	7	.611	21	–	10	.677
No. 24 Oklahoma	11	–	7	.611	22	–	11	.667
Kansas State	8	–	10	.444	19	–	13	.594
TCU	8	–	10	.444	18	–	15	.545
Iowa State	5	–	13	.278	13	–	17	.433
Texas Tech	3	–	15	.167	13	–	18	.419
Kansas	0	–	18	.000	6	–	25	.194
† 2016 Big 12 Tournament winner Rankings from AP poll

The 2015–16 West Virginia Mountaineers women's basketball team represented West Virginia University during the 2015–16 NCAA Division I women's basketball season. The Mountaineers were coached by fifteenth year head coach Mike Carey and played their home games at WVU Coliseum and were members of the Big 12 Conference. They finished with a record of 25–10, 12–6 in Big 12 play to finish in third place. They advanced to the semifinals of the Big 12 women's tournament, where they lost to Texas. They received an at-large bid to the NCAA women's tournament, where they defeated Princeton in the first round before losing to Ohio State in the second round.

== Roster ==
2015–16 West Virginia Mountaineers women's basketball team
Players
Coaches

Pos.	#	Name	Height	Year	Previous school	Hometown
G	1	Lauren Saiki	5 ft 3 in (1.6 m)	Fr	Mark Keppel	Monterey Park, CA
G	2	Alexis Brewer	5 ft 9 in (1.75 m)	Fr	Bardstown	Buffalo, KY
G	3	Oliva Seggie	5 ft 3 in (1.6 m)	Fr	Morgantown	Morgantown, WV
F	4	Kayla Montgomery	6 ft 4 in (1.93 m)	Sr	McEachern HS; Gulf Coast CC	Powder Springs, GA
G	5	Tynice Martin	5 ft 10 in (1.78 m)	Fr	Southwest Atlanta Christian Academy	Atlanta, GA
F	11	Teana Muldrow	6 ft 1 in (1.85 m)	RS So	East Orange	East Orange, NJ
G	12	Chania Ray (I) (redshirt)	5 ft 8 in (1.73 m)	So	Riverdale Baptist; Florida State	Alexandria, VA
G	14	Yassemeen "Yazzy" Sa'Dullah	5 ft 7 in (1.7 m)	Fr	Burbank	Burbank, CA
C	15	Lanay Montgomery	6 ft 5 in (1.96 m)	RS Jr	Academy of the Holy Cross	Pittsburgh, PA
C	20	Desiree Rhodes	6 ft 1 in (1.85 m)	Jr	Aurora East; Wabash Valley College	Aurora, IL
G	21	Jessica Morton	5 ft 10 in (1.78 m)	Sr	Glenn Hills; Gulf Coast CC	Augusta, GA
G	22	Katrina Pardee	5 ft 9 in (1.75 m)	Fr	Vista Ridge	Cedar Park, TX
G	23	Bria Holmes	6 ft 1 in (1.85 m)	Sr	James Hillhouse	New Haven, CT
G/F	24	Anja Martin	5 ft 11 in (1.8 m)	Fr	John Paul Stevens	San Antonio, TX
F	32	Arielle Roberson	6 ft 1 in (1.85 m)	RS Sr	Wagner; Colorado	San Antonio, TX
F	45	Marlena Schmidt	6 ft 6 in (1.98 m)	Fr	Ringgold	Eighty Four, PA

Head coach

- Mike Carey (Salem)

Assistant coach(es)

- Chester Nichols (Greenville)
- Lester Rowe (West Virginia)
- Sharrona Reaves (Alabama)

Legend

- (C) Team captain
- (S) Suspended
- (I) Ineligible
- (W) Walk-on
- Injured
- Current redshirt

Roster
Last update: 2015-10-15

== Schedule ==
Date time, TV	Rank^{#}	Opponent^{#}	Result	Record	Site (attendance) city, state
Exhibition
10/31/2015*; 7:00 pm		Shepherd	W 89–48		WVU Coliseum (2,787); Morgantown, WV
Non-Conference Games
11/14/2015*; 7:00 pm		Delaware State	W 77–34	1–0	WVU Coliseum (2,232); Morgantown, WV
11/16/2015*; 7:00 pm		Coppin State	W 96–64	2–0	WVU Coliseum (979); Morgantown, WV
11/22/2015*; 5:00 pm		at Gonzaga; Hall of Fame Women's Challenge	L 57–62	2–1	McCarthey Athletic Center (5,509); Spokane, WA
11/23/2015*; 11:00 pm		vs. USC; Hall of Fame Women's Challenge	L 67–78 ^{OT}	2–2	McCarthey Athletic Center (5,222); Spokane, WA
11/24/2015*; 11:00 pm		vs. Grand Canyon; Hall of Fame Women's Challenge	W 68–50	3–2	McCarthey Athletic Center (5,154); Spokane, WA
11/29/2015*; 4:00 pm, ESPN3		vs. Yale; Hall of Fame Women's Challenge	W 70–60	4–2	Mohegan Sun Arena (5,154); Uncasville, CT
12/02/2015*; 7:00 pm		Morehead State	W 94–56	5–2	WVU Coliseum (1,302); Morgantown, WV
12/06/2015*; 4:00 pm		Fairleigh Dickinson	W 91–42	6–2	WVU Coliseum (1,782); Morgantown, WV
12/13/2015*; 4:00 pm		vs. Marshall; Chesapeake Energy Capital Classic	W 66–60	7–2	Charleston Civic Center (3,173); Charleston, WV
12/16/2015*; 7:00 pm		Longwood	W 74–43	8–2	WVU Coliseum (1,022); Morgantown, WV
12/20/2015*; 5:00 pm		vs. James Madison; Florida Sunshine Classic	W 69–62	9–2	Worden Arena (987); Winter Haven, FL
12/21/2015*; 7:15 pm		vs. Indiana; Florida Sunshine Classic	W 75–65	10–2	Worden Arena (573); Winter Haven, FL
12/28/2015*; 7:00 pm		Elon	W 67–57	11–2	WVU Coliseum (2,026); Morgantown, WV
Conference Games
12/30/2015; 7:00 pm		No. 5 Texas	L 54–65	11–3 (0–1)	WVU Coliseum (4,153); Morgantown, WV
01/03/2016; 3:00 pm, ESPN3		at Kansas	W 65–45	12–3 (1–1)	Allen Fieldhouse (2,758); Lawrence, KS
01/06/2016; 8:00 pm, FCS Central		at Kansas State	W 72–53	13–3 (2–1)	Bramlage Coliseum (3,937); Manhattan, KS
01/09/2016; 7:00 pm		Texas Tech	W 79–57	14–3 (3–1)	WVU Coliseum (2,471); Morgantown, WV
01/12/2016; 8:00 pm, FSSW+		at No. 6 Baylor	L 64–69	14–4 (3–2)	Ferrell Center (6,032); Waco, TX
01/16/2016; 7:00 pm, RTPT		Kansas	W 72–35	15–4 (4–2)	WVU Coliseum (4,006); Morgantown, WV
01/24/2016; 1:00 pm, FSSW	No. 25	at TCU	W 97–84	16–4 (5–2)	Schollmaier Arena (2,087); Fort Worth, TX
01/27/2016; 8:00 pm, SSTV	No. 24	at No. 21 Oklahoma	L 54–57	16–5 (5–3)	Lloyd Noble Center (4,182); Norman, OK
01/30/2016; 4:00 pm, FSN	No. 24	No. 4 Baylor	L 61–71	16–6 (5–4)	WVU Coliseum (4,168); Morgantown, WV
02/02/2016; 7:00 pm, FS2		at Texas Tech	W 69–42	17–6 (6–4)	United Supermarkets Arena (2,842); Lubbock, TX
02/06/2016; 1:00 pm		Kansas State	W 64–44	18–6 (7–4)	WVU Coliseum (4,328); Morgantown, WV
02/10/2016; 7:00 pm	No. 24	Iowa State	W 57–47	19–6 (8–4)	WVU Coliseum (1,317); Morgantown, WV
02/13/2016; 6:00 pm	No. 24	at No. 20 Oklahoma State	L 51–63	19–7 (8–5)	Gallagher-Iba Arena (3,223); Stillwater, OK
02/17/2016; 7:00 pm		No. 20 Oklahoma	W 63–55	20–7 (9–5)	WVU Coliseum (2,001); Morgantown, WV
02/21/2016; 1:00 pm, FSN		at No. 4 Texas	L 50–73	20–8 (9–6)	Frank Erwin Center (4,143); Austin, TX
02/24/2016; 7:00 pm, RTPT		TCU	W 83–72	21–8 (10–6)	WVU Coliseum (1,606); Morgantown, WV
02/27/2016; 7:00 pm, RTPT		No. 22 Oklahoma State	W 82–48	22–8 (11–6)	WVU Coliseum (5,080); Morgantown, WV
03/01/2016; 8:00 pm	No. 22	at Iowa State	W 82–57	23–8 (12–6)	Hilton Coliseum (10,213); Ames, IA
Big 12 Women's Tournament
03/05/2016; 9:30 pm, FSN	No. 22	vs. Kansas State; Quarterfinals	W 74–65	24–8	Chesapeake Energy Arena (3,863); Oklahoma City, OK
03/05/2016; 5:00 pm, FS1	No. 22	vs. No. 6 Texas; Semifinals	L 51–67	24–9	Chesapeake Energy Arena (4,591); Oklahoma City, OK
NCAA Women's Tournament
03/18/2016*; 12:00 pm, ESPN2	(6 SF) No. 23	vs. (11 SF) Princeton; First Round	W 74–65	25–9	St. John Arena; Columbus, OH
03/20/2016*; 12:00 pm, ESPN2	(6 SF) No. 23	at (3 SF) No. 9 Ohio State; Second Round	L 81–88	25–10	St. John Arena (2,558); Columbus, OH
*Non-conference game. ^{#}Rankings from AP Poll. (#) Tournament seedings in parentheses. SF=Sioux Falls Region. All times are in Eastern Time.

== Rankings ==
2015–16 NCAA Division I women's basketball rankings

Regular season polls
Poll	Pre- Season	Week 2	Week 3	Week 4	Week 5	Week 6	Week 7	Week 8	Week 9	Week 10	Week 11	Week 12	Week 13	Week 14	Week 15	Week 16	Week 17	Week 18	Week 19	Final
AP	RV	NR	NR	NR	NR	NR	NR	NR	NR	RV	25	24	RV	24	RV	RV	22т	23	23	N/A
Coaches	RV	NR	NR	NR	NR	NR	NR	NR	NR	NR	RV	RV	RV	RV	RV	RV	RV	RV	25т	25

Legend
	Increase in ranking
	Decrease in ranking
	Not ranked previous week
(RV)	Received Votes

== See also ==
- 2015–16 West Virginia Mountaineers men's basketball team
