= 2015–16 Oklahoma State Cowgirls basketball team =

Intercollegiate basketball season

2015–16 Oklahoma State Cowgirls basketball

NCAA Women's Tournament, first round
- Conference: Big 12 Conference
- Record: 21–10 (11–7 Big 12)
- Head coach: Jim Littell (5th season)
- Assistant coaches: Bill Annan; Shannon Gage; Rebecca Kates-Taylor
- Home arena: Gallagher-Iba Arena

2015–16 Big 12 Conference women's basketball standings
| | Conf. | | | | Overall |
| Team | W | | L | PCT | W | | L | PCT |
|---|---|---|---|---|---|---|---|---|
| No. 4 Baylor † | 17 | – | 1 | .944 | 36 | – | 2 | .947 |
| No. 6 Texas | 15 | – | 3 | .833 | 31 | – | 5 | .861 |
| No. 22 West Virginia | 12 | – | 6 | .667 | 25 | – | 10 | .714 |
| Oklahoma State | 11 | – | 7 | .611 | 21 | – | 10 | .677 |
| No. 24 Oklahoma | 11 | – | 7 | .611 | 22 | – | 11 | .667 |
| Kansas State | 8 | – | 10 | .444 | 19 | – | 13 | .594 |
| TCU | 8 | – | 10 | .444 | 18 | – | 15 | .545 |
| Iowa State | 5 | – | 13 | .278 | 13 | – | 17 | .433 |
| Texas Tech | 3 | – | 15 | .167 | 13 | – | 18 | .419 |
| Kansas | 0 | – | 18 | .000 | 6 | – | 25 | .194 |
† 2016 Big 12 Tournament winner Rankings from AP poll

The 2015–16 Oklahoma State Cowgirls basketball team represented Oklahoma State University in the 2015–16 college basketball season. It was head coach Jim Littell's fifth season at Oklahoma State. The Cowgirls were members of the Big 12 Conference and played their home games at the Gallagher-Iba Arena. They finished the season 21–10, 11–7 in Big 12 play to finish in a tie for fourth place. They lost in the quarterfinals of the Big 12 women's tournament to Oklahoma. They received an at-large bid to the NCAA women's basketball tournament, where they lost in the first round to St. Bonaventure.

== Roster ==
2015–16 Oklahoma State Cowgirls women's basketball team
Players
Coaches

| Pos. | # | Name | Height | Year | Previous school | Hometown |
|---|---|---|---|---|---|---|
| G | 1 | Alana Simon | 5 ft 10 in (1.78 m) | Jr | Lincoln College Prep | San Mateo, CA |
| F/C | 3 | Mandy Coleman | 6 ft 3 in (1.91 m) | So | McNair | Stockton, CA |
| G | 5 | Diana Omozee | 5 ft 11 in (1.8 m) | Jr | Pflugerville | Pflugerville, TX |
| G | 10 | Sydney Walton | 5 ft 8 in (1.73 m) | So | Perryton | Perryton, TX |
| F | 13 | Jentry Holt | 6 ft 3 in (1.91 m) | Fr | Elgin | Elgin, OK |
| F | 20 | LaTashia Jones | 6 ft 2 in (1.88 m) | Fr | Leavenworth | Leavenworth, KS |
| F | 21 | Rylie Swanson | 5 ft 10 in (1.78 m) | Sr | Alva | Alva, OK |
| G | 22 | Brittney Martin | 6 ft 0 in (1.83 m) | Sr | Syracuse | Syracuse, UT |
| G | 23 | Roddricka Patton | 5 ft 4 in (1.63 m) | Sr | Neches | Palestine, TX |
| G | 24 | Karli Wheeler | 5 ft 8 in (1.73 m) | Fr | Plainview | Plainview, TX |
| F | 45 | Katelyn Loecker | 6 ft 0 in (1.83 m) | Jr | McPherson | McPherson, KS |
| C | 54 | Kaylee Jensen | 6 ft 4 in (1.93 m) | So | Lindsay Holy Family | Genoa, NE |

Head coach

- Jim Littell (Southwestern (KS))

Assistant coach(es)

- Bill Annan (Kansas State)
- Shannon Gage (Missouri State)
- Rebecca Kates-Taylor (Mississippi State)

Legend

- (C) Team captain
- (S) Suspended
- (I) Ineligible
- (W) Walk-on
- Injured
- Current redshirt

Roster

== Schedule and results ==
| Date time, TV | Rank^{#} | Opponent^{#} | Result | Record | Site (attendance) city, state |
Exhibition
| 11/01/2015*; 2:00 pm | | East Central Oklahoma | W 122–49 | | Gallagher-Iba Arena (1,088); Stillwater, OK |
| 11/08/2015*; 2:00 pm | | Northeastern State | W 94–54 | | Gallagher-Iba Arena (1,067); Stillwater, OK |
Non-conference regular season
| 11/13/2015*; 11:00 am | | Lamar | W 90–45 | 1–0 | Gallagher-Iba Arena (3,591); Stillwater, OK |
| 11/17/2015*; 7:00 pm | | Texas Southern | W 87–52 | 2–0 | Gallagher-Iba Arena (2,057); Stillwater, OK |
| 11/20/2015*; 7:00 pm | | SIU Edwardsville | W 86–61 | 3–0 | Gallagher-Iba Arena (2,286); Stillwater, OK |
| 11/23/2015*; 7:00 pm, ESPN3 | | at Missouri State | W 74–55 | 4–0 | JQH Arena (3,205); Springfield, MO |
| 11/27/2015*; 7:00 pm | | Oral Roberts | W 59–55 | 5–0 | Gallagher-Iba Arena (2,184); Stillwater, OK |
| 11/30/2015*; 7:00 pm, FSOK+ | | Washington State | W 70–60 | 6–0 | Gallagher-Iba Arena (2,410); Stillwater, OK |
| 12/05/2015*; 12:00 pm | | Texas–Rio Grande Valley | W 78–54 | 7–0 | Gallagher-Iba Arena (2,332); Stillwater, OK |
| 12/14/2015*; 7:00 pm, FSOK | | North Carolina | W 77–67 | 8–0 | Gallagher-Iba Arena (2,672); Stillwater, OK |
| 12/20/2015*; 1:00 pm | | at No. 20 South Florida | L 46–68 | 8–1 | USF Sun Dome (1,912); Tampa, FL |
| 12/22/2015*; 12:00 pm | | at UCF | W 74–55 | 9–1 | CFE Arena (908); Orlando, FL |
| 12/27/2015*; 7:00 pm | | Savannah State | W 76–48 | 10–1 | Gallagher-Iba Arena (2,352); Stillwater, OK |
Conference regular season
| 12/30/2015; 6:00 pm, FSOK+ | | No. 4 Baylor | W 52–45 | 11–1 (1–0) | Gallagher-Iba Arena (3,173); Stillwater, OK |
| 01/02/2016; 2:00 pm, Cyclones.tv | | at Iowa State | L 42–49 | 11–2 (1–1) | Hilton Coliseum (8,429); Ames, IA |
| 01/06/2016; 6:30 pm | | at Texas Tech | W 69–46 | 12–2 (2–1) | United Supermarkets Arena (4,121); Lubbock, TX |
| 01/09/2016; 5:00 pm, FSOK | | No. 4 Texas | L 48–78 | 12–3 (2–2) | Gallagher-Iba Arena (3,290); Stillwater, OK |
| 01/13/2016; 7:00 pm, ESPN3 | | at Kansas State | L 44–47 | 12–4 (2–3) | Bramlage Coliseum (4,441); Manhattan, KS |
| 01/16/2016; 12:00 pm, FSN | | No. 14 Oklahoma; Bedlam Series | W 73–42 | 13–4 (3–3) | Gallagher-Iba Arena (3,990); Stillwater, OK |
| 01/20/2016; 7:00 pm, FCS | | Iowa State | W 79–76 ^{OT} | 14–4 (4–3) | Gallagher-Iba Arena (1,926); Stillwater, OK |
| 01/24/2016; 2:00 pm | | at Kansas | W 74–46 | 15–4 (5–3) | Allen Fieldhouse (4,132); Lawrence, KS |
| 01/30/2016; 7:00 pm, FSOK | | TCU | W 80–52 | 16–4 (6–3) | Gallagher-Iba Arena (3,609); Stillwater, OK |
| 02/03/2016; 7:00 pm, FSOK+ | No. 25 | at No. 20 Oklahoma; Bedlam Series | W 71–69 | 17–4 (7–3) | Lloyd Noble Center (5,137); Norman, OK |
| 02/07/2016; 1:00 pm, FSN | No. 25 | Texas Tech | W 70–57 | 18–4 (8–3) | Gallagher-Iba Arena (3,567); Stillwater, OK |
| 02/10/2016; 7:00 pm, LHN | No. 20 | at No. 6 Texas | L 55–70 | 18–5 (8–4) | Frank Erwin Center (2,638); Austin, TX |
| 02/13/2016; 5:00 pm | No. 20 | No. 24 West Virginia | W 63–51 | 19–5 (9–4) | Gallagher-Iba Arena (3,223); Stillwater, OK |
| 02/17/2016; 7:00 pm, FSSW | No. 17 | at No. 4 Baylor | L 41–66 | 19–6 (9–5) | Ferrell Center (6,310); Waco, TX |
| 02/20/2016; 1:00 pm, FSSW | No. 17 | at TCU | L 65–79 | 19–7 (9–6) | Schollmaier Arena (2,183); Fort Worth, TX |
| 02/24/2016; 7:00 pm, FSOK+ | No. 22 | Kansas | W 71–49 | 20–7 (10–6) | Gallagher-Iba Arena (3,725); Stillwater, OK |
| 02/27/2016; 6:00 pm, RTPT | No. 22 | at West Virginia | L 48–82 | 20–8 (10–7) | WVU Coliseum (5,080); Morgantown, WV |
| 02/29/2016; 8:00 pm, FSOK+ | | Kansas State | W 59–51 | 21–8 (11–7) | Gallagher-Iba Arena (1,754); Stillwater, OK |
Big 12 Women's Tournament
| 03/05/2016; 11:00 am, FSN | | vs. No. 24 Oklahoma; Quarterfinals | L 43–61 | 21–9 | Chesapeake Energy Arena; Oklahoma City, OK |
NCAA Women's Tournament
| 03/18/2016*; 6:30 pm, ESPN2 | (7 D) | vs. (10 D) St. Bonaventure; First Round | L 54–65 | 21–10 | Gill Coliseum (4,702); Corvallis, OR |
*Non-conference game. ^{#}Rankings from AP Poll. (#) Tournament seedings in parentheses. D=Dallas Region. All times are in Central Time.

== Rankings ==
Regular season polls
| Poll | Pre- season | Week 2 | Week 3 | Week 4 | Week 5 | Week 6 | Week 7 | Week 8 | Week 9 | Week 10 | Week 11 | Week 12 | Week 13 | Week 14 | Week 15 | Week 16 | Week 17 | Week 18 | Week 19 | Final |
|---|---|---|---|---|---|---|---|---|---|---|---|---|---|---|---|---|---|---|---|---|
| AP | NR | NR | RV | RV | RV | RV | RV | RV | RV | RV | RV | RV | 25 | 20 | 17 | 22 | RV | RV | RV | N/A |
| Coaches | NR | NR | NR | RV | RV | RV | NR | NR | NR | RV | RV | RV | RV | 24т | 24 | RV | RV | NR | NR | NR |

Legend
| | Increase in ranking |
| | Decrease in ranking |
| | Not ranked previous week |
| (RV) | Received votes |

== See also ==
- 2015–16 Oklahoma State Cowboys basketball team
