= 2015–16 Texas Longhorns women's basketball team =

Intercollegiate basketball season

2015–16 Texas Longhorns women's basketball

NCAA tournament, Elite Eight
- Conference: Big 12 Conference

Ranking
- Coaches: No. 7
- AP: No. 7
- Record: 31–5 (15–3 Big 12)
- Head coach: Karen Aston (4th season)
- Assistant coaches: Travis Mays; George Washington; Tina Thompson
- Home arena: Frank Erwin Center

2015–16 Big 12 Conference women's basketball standings
	Conf.				Overall
Team	W		L	PCT	W		L	PCT
No. 4 Baylor †	17	–	1	.944	36	–	2	.947
No. 6 Texas	15	–	3	.833	31	–	5	.861
No. 22 West Virginia	12	–	6	.667	25	–	10	.714
Oklahoma State	11	–	7	.611	21	–	10	.677
No. 24 Oklahoma	11	–	7	.611	22	–	11	.667
Kansas State	8	–	10	.444	19	–	13	.594
TCU	8	–	10	.444	18	–	15	.545
Iowa State	5	–	13	.278	13	–	17	.433
Texas Tech	3	–	15	.167	13	–	18	.419
Kansas	0	–	18	.000	6	–	25	.194
† 2016 Big 12 Tournament winner Rankings from AP poll

The 2015–16 Texas Longhorns women's basketball team represented the University of Texas at Austin in the 2015–16 college basketball season. It was head coach Karen Aston's fourth season at Texas. The Longhorns were members of the Big 12 Conference and played their home games at the Frank Erwin Center. They finished the season 31–5, 15–3 in Big 12 play to finish in second place. They advanced to the championship game of the Big 12 women's basketball tournament, where they lost to Baylor. They received an at-large bid to the NCAA women's basketball tournament, where they defeated Alabama State and Missouri in the first and second rounds, and UCLA in the sweet sixteen, before last year's sweet sixteen rematch with Connecticut in the elite eight.

== Rankings ==
Regular season polls
Poll	Pre- season	Week 2	Week 3	Week 4	Week 5	Week 6	Week 7	Week 8	Week 9	Week 10	Week 11	Week 12	Week 13	Week 14	Week 15	Week 16	Week 17	Week 18	Week 19	Final
AP	12	11	8	6	5	5	5	5	4	4	6	6	6	6	8	8	6	7	7	N/A
Coaches	11	8	8	6	6	6	6	6	4	4	6	6	6	5	7	8	7	7	7	7

Legend
	Increase in ranking
	Decrease in ranking
	Not ranked previous week
(RV)	Received votes

== 2015–16 media ==
=== Television and radio information ===
Most University of Texas home games were shown on the Longhorn Network, with national telecasts on the Big 12 Conference's television partners. On the radio, women's basketball games aired on KTXX-HD4 "105.3 The Bat", with select games on KTXX-FM 104.9. This was the first year that radio broadcasts had moved from KVET (1300 AM/103.1 FM).

== Roster ==
2015–16 Texas Longhorns women's basketball team
Players
Coaches

Pos.	#	Name	Height	Year	Previous school	Hometown
G	1	Empress Davenport	5 ft 7 in (1.7 m)	Sr	Duncanville	Duncanville, TX
G	2	Celina Rodrigo	5 ft 8 in (1.73 m)	RS Sr	Hillgrove	Marietta, GA
F	5	Jordan Hosey	6 ft 1 in (1.85 m)	Fr	Manvel	Pearland, TX
G	10	Lashann Higgs	5 ft 9 in (1.75 m)	Fr	Cedar Ridge	Round Rock, TX
G	11	Brooke McCarty	5 ft 4 in (1.63 m)	So	Clear Springs	League City, TX
G	13	Emily Johnson	5 ft 11 in (1.8 m)	Jr	Georgetown; Colorado State	Georgetown, TX
F	14	Christina Aborowa	6 ft 4 in (1.93 m)	Fr	Neumann-Goretti	Ondo, Nigeria
G	20	Brianna Taylor	5 ft 9 in (1.75 m)	Jr	Spring Dekaney	Houston, TX
F	21	Nekia Jones	5 ft 11 in (1.8 m)	So	Ozen	Beaumont, TX
G	22	Tasia Forman	5 ft 4 in (1.63 m)	So	Duncanville	Duncanville, TX
G	24	Ariel Atkins	5 ft 11 in (1.8 m)	So	Duncanville	Duncanville, TX
F	30	Khaléann Caron-Goudreau (redshirt)	6 ft 2 in (1.88 m)	So	IMG Academy; Vanderbilt	Gatineau, QE
G	32	Brady Sanders	5 ft 11 in (1.8 m)	RS Sr	Godley	Joshua, TX
F	33	Sara Hattis	6 ft 4 in (1.93 m)	Jr	Cleveland	Rio Rancho, NM
C	34	Imani Boyette	6 ft 7 in (2.01 m)	Sr	Windward	Los Angeles, CA
F	35	Diani Akigbogun	6 ft 1 in (1.85 m)	So	Regis Jesuit	Aurora, CO
C	40	Kelsey Lang	6 ft 5 in (1.96 m)	Jr	The Woodlands	The Woodlands, TX

Head coach

- Karen Aston (Little Rock)

Assistant coach(es)

- Travis Mays (Texas)
- George Washington (Abilene Christian)
- Tina Thompson (USC)

Legend

- (C) Team captain
- (S) Suspended
- (I) Ineligible
- (W) Walk-on
- Injured
- Current redshirt

Roster
Last update: 2015-06-07

== Schedule ==
Date time, TV	Rank^{#}	Opponent^{#}	Result	Record	Site (attendance) city, state
Non-conference regular season
11/14/2015*; 7:00 pm, LHN	No. 12	UTSA	W 90–53	1–0	Frank Erwin Center (2,596); Austin, TX
11/18/2015*; 11:00 am, LHN	No. 11	Northwestern State	W 86–33	2–0	Frank Erwin Center (7,582); Austin, TX
11/21/2015*; 2:00 pm	No. 11	at Rice	W 70–47	3–0	Tudor Fieldhouse (821); Houston, TX
11/25/2015*; 7:00 pm, LHN	No. 8	Hampton	W 79–52	4–0	Frank Erwin Center (2,507); Austin, TX
11/29/2015*; 1:30 pm, ESPN	No. 8	at No. 4 Tennessee	W 64–53	5–0	Thompson–Boling Arena (10,204); Knoxville, TN
12/02/2015*; 7:00 pm, LHN	No. 6	No. 9 Mississippi State	W 53–47	6–0	Frank Erwin Center (2,887); Austin, TX
12/06/2015*; 2:00 pm	No. 6	at Little Rock	W 66–56	7–0	Jack Stephens Center (1,642); Little Rock, AR
12/13/2015*; 12:00 pm, ESPN	No. 5	No. 14 Stanford	W 77–69	8–0	Frank Erwin Center (3,942); Austin, TX
12/16/2015*; 7:00 pm, LHN	No. 5	Canisius	W 92–62	9–0	Frank Erwin Center (2,370); Austin, TX
12/20/2015*; 1:30 pm, FS1	No. 5	vs. Arkansas; Big 12/SEC Women's Challenge	W 61–50	10–0	Chesapeake Energy Arena; Oklahoma City, OK
12/27/2015*; 2:00 pm, LHN	No. 5	Sam Houston State	W 83–49	11–0	Frank Erwin Center (3,123); Austin, TX
Big 12 regular season
12/30/2015; 6:00 pm	No. 5	at West Virginia	W 65–54	12–0 (1–0)	WVU Coliseum (4,153); Morgantown, WV
01/02/2016; 7:00 pm, LHN	No. 5	Texas Tech	W 86–62	13–0 (2–0)	Frank Erwin Center (3,668); Austin, TX
01/06/2016; 7:00 pm, LHN	No. 4	Iowa State	W 75–54	14–0 (3–0)	Frank Erwin Center (2,836); Austin, TX
01/09/2016; 5:00 pm	No. 4	at Oklahoma State	W 78–48	15–0 (4–0)	Gallagher-Iba Arena (3,290); Stillwater, OK
01/13/2016; 7:00 pm, ESPN3	No. 4	at Kansas	W 75–38	16–0 (5–0)	Allen Fieldhouse (1,903); Lawrence, KS
01/17/2016; 2:00 pm, ESPN2	No. 4	No. 6 Baylor	L 67–80	16–1 (5–1)	Frank Erwin Center (8,996); Austin, TX
01/20/2016; 7:00 pm	No. 6	at TCU	W 65–58	17–1 (6–1)	Schollmaier Arena (2,792); Fort Worth, TX
01/23/2016; 11:00 am, FSN	No. 6	No. 19 Oklahoma	W 83–76	18–1 (7–1)	Frank Erwin Center (4,096); Austin, TX
01/27/2016; 7:00 pm, LHN	No. 6	Kansas	W 70–46	19–1 (8–1)	Frank Erwin Center (3,126); Austin, TX
01/30/2016; 7:00 pm, ESPN3	No. 6	Kansas State	W 66–51	20–1 (9–1)	Bramlage Coliseum (4,846); Manhattan, KS
02/06/2016; 1:30 pm, FS2	No. 6	at Iowa State	W 65–49	21–1 (10–1)	Hilton Coliseum (11,261); Ames, IA
02/10/2016; 7:00 pm, LHN	No. 6	No. 20 Oklahoma State	W 70–55	22–1 (11–1)	Frank Erwin Center (2,638); Austin, TX
02/14/2016; 1:30 pm, FS1	No. 6	at No. 21 Oklahoma	L 56–74	22–2 (11–2)	Lloyd Noble Center (4,853); Norman, OK
02/17/2016; 7:00 pm, LHN	No. 8	Kansas State	W 58–51	23–2 (12–2)	Frank Erwin Center (3,036); Austin, TX
02/21/2016; 12:00 pm, FSN	No. 8	West Virginia	W 73–50	24–2 (13–2)	Frank Erwin Center (4,143); Austin, TX
02/24/2016; 6:30 pm	No. 8	at Texas Tech	W 76–55	25–2 (14–2)	United Supermarkets Arena (3,555); Lubbock, TX
02/27/2016; 7:00 pm, LHN	No. 8	TCU	W 71–58	26–2 (15–2)	Frank Erwin Center (4,069); Austin, TX
02/29/2016; 8:00 pm, FS1	No. 6	at No. 4 Baylor	L 48–74	26–3 (15–3)	Ferrell Center (10,284); Waco, TX
2016 Big 12 women's basketball tournament
03/05/2016; 6:00 pm, FSN	No. 6	vs. Kansas; Quarterfinals	W 66–50	27–3	Chesapeake Energy Arena (3,863); Oklahoma City, OK
03/06/2016; 4:00 pm, FS1	No. 6	vs. West Virginia; Semifinals	W 67–51	28–3	Chesapeake Energy Arena (4,591); Oklahoma City, OK
03/07/2016; 8:00 pm, FS1	No. 7	vs. No. 4 Baylor; Championship Game	L 63–79	28–4	Chesapeake Energy Arena (3,859); Oklahoma City, OK
NCAA women's tournament
03/19/2016*; 8:00 pm, ESPN2	(2 B) No. 7	(15 B) Alabama State; First Round	W 86–42	29–4	Frank Erwin Center (2,645); Austin, TX
03/21/2016*; 8:15 pm, ESPN2	(2 B) No. 7	(10 B) Missouri; Second Round	W 73–55	30–4	Frank Erwin Center (2,345); Austin, TX
03/26/2016*; 12:30 pm, ESPN	(2 B) No. 7	vs. (3 B) No. 10 UCLA; Sweet Sixteen	W 72–64	31–4	Webster Bank Arena (8,898); Bridgeport, CT
03/28/2016*; 6:00 pm, ESPN	(2 B) No. 7	vs. (1 B) No. 1 Connecticut; Elite Eight	L 65–86	31–5	Webster Bank Arena (9,088); Bridgeport, CT
*Non-conference game. ^{#}Rankings from AP Poll. (#) Tournament seedings in parentheses. B=Bridgeport Region. All times are in Central Time.

== See also ==
- Texas Longhorns women's basketball
- 2015–16 Texas Longhorns men's basketball team
