= 2015–16 Oklahoma Sooners women's basketball team =

Intercollegiate basketball season

2015–16 Oklahoma Sooners women's basketball

Junkanoo Jam Reef Division champions

NCAA Women's Tournament, second round
- Conference: Big 12

Ranking
- Coaches: No. 23
- AP: No. 24
- Record: 22–11 (11–7 Big 12)
- Head coach: Sherri Coale (20th season)
- Assistant coaches: Jan Ross; Pam DeCosta; Chad Thrailkill
- Home arena: Lloyd Noble Center

2015–16 Big 12 Conference women's basketball standings
	Conf.				Overall
Team	W		L	PCT	W		L	PCT
No. 4 Baylor †	17	–	1	.944	36	–	2	.947
No. 6 Texas	15	–	3	.833	31	–	5	.861
No. 22 West Virginia	12	–	6	.667	25	–	10	.714
Oklahoma State	11	–	7	.611	21	–	10	.677
No. 24 Oklahoma	11	–	7	.611	22	–	11	.667
Kansas State	8	–	10	.444	19	–	13	.594
TCU	8	–	10	.444	18	–	15	.545
Iowa State	5	–	13	.278	13	–	17	.433
Texas Tech	3	–	15	.167	13	–	18	.419
Kansas	0	–	18	.000	6	–	25	.194
† 2016 Big 12 Tournament winner Rankings from AP poll

The 2015–16 Oklahoma Sooners women's basketball team represented the University of Oklahoma in the 2015–16 NCAA Division I women's basketball season. The Sooners were led by Sherri Coale in her twentieth season. The team played its home games at the Lloyd Noble Center in Norman, Oklahoma as a member of the Big 12 Conference. They finished the season 22–11, 11–7 in Big 12 play to finish in a tie for fourth place. They advanced to the semifinals of the Big 12 women's tournament, where they lost to Baylor. They received an at-large bid to the NCAA women's tournament, where they defeated Purdue in the first round before losing to Kentucky in the second round.

== Roster ==
2015–16 Oklahoma Sooners women's basketball team
Players
Coaches

Pos.	#	Name	Height	Year	Previous school	Hometown
C	0	Vionise Pierre-Louise	6 ft 4 in (1.93 m)	So	Grandview Prep	Lake Worth, FL
G	2	T'ona Edwards	5 ft 5 in (1.65 m)	Jr	Northeast Academy	Spencer, OK
G	10	Peyton Little	5 ft 11 in (1.8 m)	RS Jr	Wylie	Abilene, TX
G	11	Derica Wyatt	5 ft 10 in (1.78 m)	Jr	Franklin Road Academy	Brentwood, TN
G	12	Gileysa Penzo	5 ft 9 in (1.75 m)	RS Fr	Montverde Academy	Guaynabo, Puerto Rico
G	21	Gabbi Ortiz	5 ft 9 in (1.75 m)	So	The Prairie School	Racine, WI
F	22	Shaya Kellogg	6 ft 2 in (1.88 m)	Jr	Ames	Ames, IA
G	23	Maddie Manning	6 ft 2 in (1.88 m)	RS Jr	Ankeny	Ankeny, IA
F	24	Ijeoma Odimgbe	6 ft 4 in (1.93 m)	Fr	Johnson	Savannah, GA
G	25	Gioya Carter	5 ft 9 in (1.75 m)	Jr	Carl Albert	Midwest City, OK
C	30	McKeena Treece	6 ft 4 in (1.93 m)	So	Incarnate Word Academy	St. Peters, MO
G	32	LaNesia Williams	5 ft 7 in (1.7 m)	So	Northeast Academy	Oklahoma City, OK
F	42	Kaylon Williams	6 ft 3 in (1.91 m)	RS Sr	Midwest City	Midwest City, OK

Head coach

- Sherri Coale (Oklahoma Christian)

Assistant coach(es)

- Jan Ross (Oklahoma Christian)
- Pam DeCosta (Metro State)
- Chad Thrailkill (Southern Nazarene)

Legend

- (C) Team captain
- (S) Suspended
- (I) Ineligible
- (W) Walk-on
- Injured
- Current redshirt

Roster
Last update: 2015-10-14

== Schedule ==
Date time, TV	Rank^{#}	Opponent^{#}	Result	Record	Site (attendance) city, state
Exhibition
11/04/2015*; 7:00 pm, FSSW+	No. 17	Southwestern Oklahoma State	W 111–73		Lloyd Noble Center; Norman, OK
Non-conference regular season
11/13/2015*; 7:00 pm, FCSC	No. 17	Winthrop	W 78–48	1–0	Lloyd Noble Center (3,713); Norman, OK
11/16/2015*; 7:00 pm, FCSC	No. 17	North Texas	L 57–61	1–1	Lloyd Noble Center (3,829); Norman, OK
11/19/2015*; 6:00 pm, FSSW+	No. 17	BYU	W 73–47	2–1	Lloyd Noble Center (3,849); Norman, OK
11/22/2015*; 2:00 pm, ESPN3	No. 17	at Bradley	W 79–46	3–1	Renaissance Coliseum (778); Peoria, IL
11/26/2015*; 3:15 pm	No. 21	vs. Utah; Junkanoo Jam Reef Division	W 70–55	4–1	Grand Lucayan Resort (353); Freeport, BAH
11/28/2015*; 7:00 pm	No. 21	vs. Boston College; Junkanoo Jam Reef Division	W 76–61	5–1	Grand Lucayan Resort (495); Freeport, BAH
12/02/2015*; 7:00 pm, FSSW+	No. 21	Little Rock	W 65–52	6–1	Lloyd Noble Center (3,747); Norman, OK
12/06/2015*; 5:30 pm, P12N	No. 21	at Washington	W 71–68	7–1	Alaska Airlines Arena (1,580); Seattle, WA
12/09/2015*; 7:00 pm	No. 17	at Tulsa	W 75–62	8–1	Reynolds Center (1,770); Tulsa, OK
12/13/2015*; 2:00 pm, FSOK	No. 17	UTSA	W 80–41	9–1	Lloyd Noble Center (4,086); Norman, OK
12/20/2015*; 4:00 pm, FS1	No. 17	vs. No. 18 Texas A&M; Big 12/SEC Women's Challenge	L 68–74	9–2	Chesapeake Energy Arena (2,403); Oklahoma City, OK
Big 12 regular season
12/30/2015; 7:00 pm, FSOK	No. 18	Kansas	W 67–44	10–2 (1–0)	Lloyd Noble Center (5,328); Norman, OK
01/03/2016; 3:30 pm, FS1	No. 18	at No. 4 Baylor	L 68–78	11–2 (1–1)	Ferrell Center (7,434); Waco, TX
01/06/2016; 7:00 pm, FSSW+	No. 17	at TCU	W 78–65	11–3 (2–1)	Schollmaier Arena (2,227); Fort Worth, TX
01/10/2016; 1:00 pm, FSOK	No. 17	Kansas State	W 68–58	12–3 (3–1)	Lloyd Noble Center (4,637); Norman, OK
01/16/2016; 12:00 pm, FSN	No. 14	at Oklahoma State; Bedlam Series	L 42–73	12–4 (3–2)	Gallagher-Iba Arena (3,990); Stillwater, OK
01/20/2016; 10:30 am, FSOK	No. 19	Texas Tech	W 92–53	13–4 (4–2)	Lloyd Noble Center; Norman, OK
01/23/2016; 11:00 am, FSN	No. 19	at No. 6 Texas	L 76–83	13–5 (4–3)	Frank Erwin Center (4,096); Austin, TX
01/27/2016; 7:00 pm, FSOK+	No. 21	No. 24 West Virginia	W 57–54	14–5 (5–3)	Lloyd Noble Center (4,182); Norman, OK
01/30/2016; 1:00 pm, FSN	No. 21	at Iowa State	W 77–71	15–5 (6–3)	Hilton Coliseum (11,249); Ames, IA
02/03/2016; 7:00 pm, FSOK+	No. 20	No. 25 Oklahoma State; Bedlam Series	L 69–71	15–6 (6–4)	Lloyd Noble Center (5,137); Norman, OK
02/06/2016; 2:00 pm, FSOK	No. 20	TCU	W 77–64	16–6 (7–4)	Lloyd Noble Center (4,322); Norman, OK
02/09/2016; 7:00 pm	No. 21	at Kansas State	L 71–87	16–7 (7–5)	Bramlage Coliseum (3,954); Manhattan, KS
02/14/2016; 1:30 pm, FS1	No. 21	No. 6 Texas	W 74–56	17–7 (8–5)	Lloyd Noble Center (4,853); Norman, OK
02/17/2016; 6:00 pm	No. 20	West Virginia	L 55–63	17–8 (8–6)	WVU Coliseum (2,001); Morgantown, WV
02/20/2016; 7:00 pm, ESPN3	No. 20	at Kansas	W 72–66	18–8 (9–6)	Allen Fieldhouse (4,737); Lawrence, KS
02/22/2016; 8:00 pm, ESPN2	No. 23	at No. 4 Baylor	L 70–78	18–9 (9–7)	Lloyd Noble Center (5,277); Norman, OK
02/27/2016; 2:00 pm, FSOK+	No. 23	Iowa State	W 85–54	19–9 (10–7)	Lloyd Noble Center (5,192); Norman, OK
03/01/2016; 6:30 pm	No. 24	at Texas Tech	W 70–60	20–9 (11–7)	United Supermarkets Arena (3,116); Lubbock, TX
Big 12 Women's Tournament
03/05/2016; 11:00 am, FSN	No. 24	vs. Oklahoma State; Quarterfinals	W 61–43	21–9	Chesapeake Energy Arena; Oklahoma City, OK
03/06/2016; 1:30 pm, FS1	No. 24	vs. No. 4 Baylor; Semifinals	L 57–84	21–10	Chesapeake Energy Arena (4,591); Oklahoma City, OK
NCAA Women's Tournament
03/19/2016*; 12:30 pm, ESPN2	(6 L) No. 24	vs. (11 L) Purdue; First Round	W 61–45	22–10	Memorial Coliseum; Lexington, KY
03/21/2016*; 5:30 pm, ESPN2	(6 L) No. 24	at (3 L) No. 12 Kentucky; Second Round	L 58–79	22–11	Memorial Coliseum (3,056); Lexington, KY
*Non-conference game. ^{#}Rankings from AP Poll. (#) Tournament seedings in parentheses. L=Lexington Region. All times are in Central Time.

x- Sooner Sports Television (SSTV) is aired locally on Fox Sports. However the contract allows games to air on various affiliates. Those affiliates are FSSW, FSSW+, FSOK, FSOK+, and FCS Atlantic, Central, and Pacific.

== Rankings ==
Regular season polls
Poll	Pre- season	Week 2	Week 3	Week 4	Week 5	Week 6	Week 7	Week 8	Week 9	Week 10	Week 11	Week 12	Week 13	Week 14	Week 15	Week 16	Week 17	Week 18	Week 19	Final
AP	17	17	21	21	17	17	18	18	17	14	19	21	20	21	20	23	24	24	24	N/A
Coaches	18	24т	24	22	18	17	19	19	19	17	19	20	19	21	21	23	22	23	23	23

Legend
	Increase in ranking
	Decrease in ranking
	Not ranked previous week
(RV)	Received votes

== See also ==
- 2015–16 Oklahoma Sooners men's basketball team
