= 2015–16 Baylor Lady Bears basketball team =

Intercollegiate basketball season

2015–16 Baylor Lady Bears basketball

Preseason WNIT champions Big 12 regular season & Tournament champions

NCAA tournament, Elite Eight
- Conference: Big 12 Conference

Ranking
- Coaches: No. 4
- AP: No. 4
- Record: 36–2 (17–1 Big 12)
- Head coach: Kim Mulkey (15th season)
- Assistant coaches: Bill Brock; Sytia Messer; Toyelle Wilson
- Home arena: Ferrell Center

2015–16 Big 12 Conference women's basketball standings
	Conf.				Overall
Team	W		L	PCT	W		L	PCT
No. 4 Baylor †	17	–	1	.944	36	–	2	.947
No. 6 Texas	15	–	3	.833	31	–	5	.861
No. 22 West Virginia	12	–	6	.667	25	–	10	.714
Oklahoma State	11	–	7	.611	21	–	10	.677
No. 24 Oklahoma	11	–	7	.611	22	–	11	.667
Kansas State	8	–	10	.444	19	–	13	.594
TCU	8	–	10	.444	18	–	15	.545
Iowa State	5	–	13	.278	13	–	17	.433
Texas Tech	3	–	15	.167	13	–	18	.419
Kansas	0	–	18	.000	6	–	25	.194
† 2016 Big 12 Tournament winner Rankings from AP poll

The 2015–16 Baylor Lady Bears basketball team represented Baylor University in the 2015–16 NCAA Division I women's basketball season. Returning as head coach was Hall of Famer Kim Mulkey for her 15th season. The team played its home games at the Ferrell Center in Waco, Texas and were members of the Big 12 Conference. They finished the season 33–4, 16–2 in Big 12 to win the Big 12 regular season title. They also won the Big 12 Women's Tournament to earn an automatic trip to the NCAA women's tournament, where they defeated Idaho and Auburn in the first and second rounds, Florida State in the sweet sixteen before losing to Oregon State in the elite eight.

== Roster ==
2015–16 Baylor Bears women's basketball team
Players
Coaches

Pos.	#	Name	Height	Year	Previous school	Hometown
F	1	Dekeiya Cohen	6 ft 2 in (1.88 m)	So	West Ashley	Charleston, SC
G	2	Niya Johnson	5 ft 8 in (1.73 m)	Sr	P.K. Yonge Development Research	Gainesville, FL
F	3	Chardonae Fuqua'	6 ft 0 in (1.83 m)	Sr	Hoover	Birmingham, AL
G	4	Kristy Wallace	5 ft 11 in (1.8 m)	So	John Paul College	Loganholme, Queensland, Australia
G	10	Alexandria Gulley	5 ft 7 in (1.7 m)	Fr	Skyline	Dallas, Texas
F	11	Justis Szcezepanski	6 ft 3 in (1.91 m)	Fr	IMG Academy	Fort Worth, TX
G	12	Alexis Prince	6 ft 1 in (1.85 m)	RS Jr	Edgewater	Orlando, FL
F	13	Nina Davis	6 ft 0 in (1.83 m)	Jr	Hoover	Birmingham, AL
C	21	Kalani Brown	6 ft 7 in (2.01 m)	Fr	Salmen	Slidell, LA
G	25	Alyssa Dry	5 ft 7 in (1.7 m)	Fr	IMG Academy	Fort Worth, TX
G	30	Alexis Jones	5 ft 8 in (1.73 m)	RS Jr	MacArthur; Duke	Irving, TX
C	32	Beatrice Mompremier	6 ft 4 in (1.93 m)	Fr	Miami	Miami, FL
F/C	55	Khadijiah Cave	6 ft 2 in (1.88 m)	Jr	Lucy Laney	Augusta, GA

Head coach

- Kim Mulkey (Louisiana Tech)

Assistant coach(es)

- Bill Brock (SE Oklahoma State)
- Sytia Messer (Arkansas)
- Toyelle Wilson (Manhattan)

Legend

- (C) Team captain
- (S) Suspended
- (I) Ineligible
- (W) Walk-on
- Injured
- Current redshirt

Roster
Last update: 2015-10-10

== Rankings ==
2015–16 NCAA Division I women's basketball rankings

Regular season polls
Poll	Pre- Season	Week 2	Week 3	Week 4	Week 5	Week 6	Week 7	Week 8	Week 9	Week 10	Week 11	Week 12	Week 13	Week 14	Week 15	Week 16	Week 17	Week 18	Week 19	Final
AP	5	5	5	4	4	4	4	4	6	6	4	4	4	4	4	4	4	4	4	N/A
Coaches	5	4	4	4	4	4	4	4	7	7	4	4	4	4	4	4	4	4	4	4

Legend
	Increase in ranking
	Decrease in ranking
	Not ranked previous week
(RV)	Received Votes

== Schedule ==
Date time, TV	Rank^{#}	Opponent^{#}	Result	Record	Site (attendance) city, state
Exhibition
11/03/2015*; 7:00 pm	No. 5	Texas A&M–Commerce	W 104–41		Ferrell Center (5,352); Waco, TX
11/09/2015*; 7:00 pm	No. 5	Arkansas–Monticello	W 104–39		Ferrell Center (5,356); Waco, TX
Non-conference regular season
11/13/2015*; 6:00 pm, FSSW+	No. 5	Texas–Arlington; Preseason WNIT First Round	W 62–20	1–0	Ferrell Center (6,804); Waco, TX
11/16/2015*; 7:00 pm	No. 5	Southern Miss; Preseason WNIT Second Round	W 97–42	2–0	Ferrell Center (5,400); Waco, TX
11/19/2015*; 7:00 pm	No. 5	No. 19 South Florida; Preseason WNIT semifinals	W 66–63	3–0	Ferrell Center (5,717); Waco, TX
11/22/2015*; 2:00 pm, CBSSN	No. 5	DePaul; Preseason WNIT Championship	W 86–72	4–0	Ferrell Center (5,637); Waco, TX
11/26/2015*; 1:00 pm	No. 5	vs. Cincinnati; Junkanoo Jam Lucaya Division	W 72–34	5–0	St. George HS Gymnasium (353); Freeport, BAH
11/28/2015*; 4:45 pm	No. 5	vs. No. 20 Michigan State; Junkanoo Jam Lucaya Division	W 84–76	6–0	St. George HS Gymnasium (684); Freeport, BAH
12/02/2015*; 6:00 pm, FSSW+	No. 4	Rice	W 89–38	7–0	Ferrell Center (5,615); Waco, TX
12/04/2015*; 7:00 pm	No. 4	Northwestern State	W 86–44	8–0	Ferrell Center (6,317); Waco, TX
12/06/2015*; 2:00 pm	No. 4	Grambling State	W 96–42	9–0	Ferrell Center (5,562); Waco, TX
12/13/2015*; 2:00 pm	No. 4	McNeese State	W 105–46	10–0	Ferrell Center (5,625); Waco, TX
12/17/2015*; 7:00 pm, FCS	No. 4	Oral Roberts	W 97–39	11–0	Ferrell Center (6,189); Waco, TX
12/19/2015*; 6:00 pm	No. 4	vs. No. 23 Miami (FL); Florida Sunshine Classic	W 88–81	12–0	Worden Arena (1,789); Winter Haven, FL
12/21/2015*; 4:00 pm	No. 4	vs. James Madison; Florida Sunshine Classic	W 77–63	13–0	Worden Arena (932); Winter Haven, FL
Big 12 regular season
12/30/2015; 6:00 pm	No. 4	at Oklahoma State	L 45–52	13–1 (0–1)	Gallagher-Iba Arena (3,173); Stillwater, OK
01/03/2016; 3:30 pm, FS1	No. 4	No. 18 Oklahoma	W 78–68	14–1 (1–1)	Ferrell Center (7,434); Waco, TX
01/06/2016; 7:00 pm	No. 6	at Kansas	W 58–40	15–1 (2–1)	Allen Fieldhouse (2,109); Lawrence, KS
01/09/2016; 11:00 am, FSN	No. 6	TCU	W 72–55	16–1 (3–1)	Ferrell Center (7,081); Waco, TX
01/12/2016; 7:00 pm, FSSW+	No. 6	West Virginia	W 69–64	17–1 (4–1)	Ferrell Center (6,032); Waco, TX
01/17/2016; 2:00 pm, ESPN2	No. 6	at No. 4 Texas	W 80–67	18–1 (5–1)	Frank Erwin Center (8,996); Austin, TX
01/23/2016; 12:30 pm, FS1	No. 4	at Iowa State	W 77–61	19–1 (6–1)	Hilton Coliseum (11,587); Ames, IA
01/27/2016; 7:00 pm, FSSW	No. 4	Texas Tech	W 69–43	20–1 (7–1)	Ferrell Center (6,327); Waco, TX
01/30/2016; 3:00 pm, FSN	No. 4	at No. 24 West Virginia	W 71–61	21–1 (8–1)	WVU Coliseum (4,168); Morgantown, WV
02/03/2016; 7:00 pm, FSSW+	No. 4	Kansas State	W 87–52	22–1 (9–1)	Ferrell Center (5,752); Waco, TX
02/06/2016; 2:00 pm, FSSW	No. 4	Kansas	W 81–49	23–1 (10–1)	Ferrell Center (6,709); Waco, TX
02/10/2016; 7:00 pm, FSSW	No. 4	at TCU	W 81–77	24–1 (11–1)	Schollmaier Arena (3,947); Fort Worth, TX
02/13/2016; 2:00 pm	No. 4	at Texas Tech	W 66–36	25–1 (12–1)	United Supermarkets Arena (6,565); Lubbock, TX
02/17/2016; 7:00 pm, FSSW	No. 4	No. 17 Oklahoma State	W 66–41	26–1 (13–1)	Ferrell Center (6,310); Waco, TX
02/20/2016; 2:00 pm, FSSW+	No. 4	Iowa State	W 78–41	27–1 (14–1)	Ferrell Center (7,216); Waco, TX
02/22/2016; 8:00 pm, ESPN2	No. 4	at No. 23 Oklahoma	W 78–70	28–1 (15–1)	Lloyd Noble Center (5,277); Norman, OK
02/27/2016; 3:30 pm, FS2	No. 4	at Kansas State	W 63–52	29–1 (16–1)	Bramlage Coliseum (5,451); Manhattan, KS
02/29/2016; 8:00 pm, FS1	No. 4	No. 6 Texas	W 74–48	30–1 (17–1)	Ferrell Center (10,284); Waco, TX
Big 12 Women's Tournament
03/05/2016; 1:30 pm, FSN	No. 4	vs. Texas Tech; Quarterfinals	W 82–51	31–1	Chesapeake Energy Arena (4,527); Oklahoma City, OK
03/06/2016; 1:30 pm, FS1	No. 4	vs. No. 24 Oklahoma; Semifinals	W 84–57	32–1	Chesapeake Energy Arena (4,591); Oklahoma City, OK
03/07/2016; 8:00 pm, FS1	No. 4	vs. No. 7 Texas; Championship Game	W 79–63	33–1	Chesapeake Energy Arena (3,859); Oklahoma City, OK
NCAA Women's Tournament
03/18/2016*; 4:00 pm, ESPN2	(1 D) No. 4	(16 D) Idaho; First Round	W 89–59	34–1	Ferrell Center (4,990); Waco, TX
03/20/2016*; 6:00 pm, ESPN2	(1 D) No. 4	(9 D) Auburn; Second Round	W 84–52	35–1	Ferrell Center (4,665); Waco, TX
03/26/2016*; 3:00 pm, ESPN	(1 D) No. 4	vs. (5 D) No. 17 Florida State; Sweet Sixteen	W 78–58	36–1	American Airlines Center (7,109); Dallas, TX
03/28/2016*; 6:00 pm, ESPN	(1 D) No. 4	vs. (2 D) No. 6 Oregon State; Elite Eight	L 57–60	36–2	American Airlines Center (6,050); Dallas, TX
*Non-conference game. ^{#}Rankings from AP Poll. (#) Tournament seedings in parentheses. D=Dallas Region. All times are in Central Time.

== See also ==
- 2015–16 Baylor Bears basketball team
