= Christian Academy of Knoxville =

Location
- 529 Academy Way; Knoxville, Tennessee; United States; 35.925°N 84.104°W

Information
- Type: Private
- Motto: Soli Deo Gloria
- Established: 1977
- Superintendent: Rich Fulford
- Teaching staff: 86.4 (on an FTE basis)
- Grades: K-12
- Enrollment: 948 (2017-18)
- Student to teacher ratio: 11.0
- Colors: Royal blue and Vegas gold
- Nickname: Warriors

Christian Academy of Knoxville (CAK) is a private, non-denominational Christian school located in Knoxville, Tennessee.

== Athletics ==
The Warriors field teams in several sports, competing in Division II (private schools) of the Tennessee Secondary School Athletic Association. Varsity Warriors sports teams have won nine state titles in men's soccer and four in women's soccer since 2003, and won the Class 3A football State Championship in 2011 and 2012.
