= 2015–16 NCAA Division I women's basketball rankings =

- Season: 2015–16
- NCAA Tournament: 2016
- Preseason No. 1: Connecticut
- NCAA Tournament Champions: Connecticut
NCAA Division I women's basketball rankings


Two human polls make up the 2015–16 NCAA Division I women's basketball rankings, the AP Poll and the Coaches Poll, in addition to various publications' preseason polls.

== Notable events ==
Duke dropped out of the top 25 in the AP Poll released 18 January 2016. They had been in the top 25 for the prior 312 consecutive weeks, starting with 29 November 1999 (17 seasons). The 312 week run is the third longest streak in history.

== Legend ==
	Increase in ranking
	Decrease in ranking
	Not ranked previous week
Italics	Number of first place votes
(#-#)	Win–loss record
т	Tied with team above or below also with this symbol

== AP Poll ==
This poll is compiled by sportswriters across the nation. In Division I men's and women's college basketball, the AP Poll is largely just a tool to compare schools throughout the season and spark debate, as it has no bearing on postseason play.

This marks the 40th year of the AP poll which was started in November 1976. Tennessee was not in the initial poll but made the final season poll in the first year and every subsequent year until this year. Texas now has 500 appearances in the poll, joining Tennessee and Georgia with this distinction.

	Preseason Nov. 10	Week 2 Nov. 17	Week 3 Nov. 24	Week 4 Dec. 1	Week 5 Dec. 8	Week 6 Dec. 15	Week 7 Dec. 22	Week 8 Dec. 28	Week 9 Jan. 4	Week 10 Jan. 11	Week 11 Jan. 18	Week 12 Jan. 25	Week 13 Feb. 1	Week 14 Feb. 8	Week 15 Feb. 15	Week 16 Feb. 22	Week 17 Feb. 29	Week 18 Mar. 7	Week 19 Mar. 14	
1.	Connecticut (32)	Connecticut (0-0) (31)	Connecticut (1-0) (32)	Connecticut (3-0) (32)	Connecticut (6-0) (32)	Connecticut (8-0) (32)	Connecticut (8-0) (32)	Connecticut (9-0) (32)	Connecticut (11-0) (32)	Connecticut (14-0) (32)	Connecticut (16-0) (32)	Connecticut (18-0) (32)	Connecticut (20-0) (32)	Connecticut (22-0) (32)	Connecticut (24–0) (32)	Connecticut (26–0) (32)	Connecticut (28–0) (32)	Connecticut (31–0) (32)	Connecticut (31–0) (32)	1.
2.	South Carolina	South Carolina (2-0) (1)	South Carolina (4-0)	South Carolina (7-0)	South Carolina (8-0)	South Carolina (9-0)	South Carolina (11-0)	South Carolina (12-0)	South Carolina (13-0)	South Carolina (15-0)	South Carolina (17-0)	South Carolina (19-0)	South Carolina (21-0)	South Carolina (22-0)	Notre Dame (24–1)	Notre Dame (25–1)	Notre Dame (28–1)	Notre Dame (31–1)	Notre Dame (31–1)	2.
3.	Notre Dame	Notre Dame (1-0)	Notre Dame (3-0)	Notre Dame (6-0)	Notre Dame (7-1)	Notre Dame (9-1)	Notre Dame (9-1)	Notre Dame (10-1)	Notre Dame (13-1)	Notre Dame (15-1)	Notre Dame (16-1)	Notre Dame (19-1)	Notre Dame (20-1)	Notre Dame (23-1)	South Carolina (23–1)	South Carolina (25–1)	South Carolina (28–1)	South Carolina (31–1)	South Carolina (31–1)	3.
4.	Tennessee	Tennessee (1-0)	Tennessee (3-0)	Baylor (6-0)	Baylor (9-0)	Baylor (10-0)	Baylor (12-0)	Baylor (13-0)	Texas (13-0)	Texas (15-0)	Baylor (18-1)	Baylor (19-1)	Baylor (21-1)	Baylor (23-1)	Baylor (25–1)	Baylor (27–1)	Baylor (29–1)	Baylor (32–1)	Baylor (32–1)	4.
5.	Baylor	Baylor (1-0)	Baylor (4-0)	Maryland (6-0)	Maryland (8-0)T	Texas (8-0)	Texas (10-0)	Texas (11-0)	Ohio State (10-3)	Ohio State (12-3)	Maryland (16-2)	Maryland (17-2)	Maryland (19-2)	Maryland (21-2)	Ohio State (21–4)	Ohio State (23–4)	Maryland (27–3)	Maryland (30–3)	Maryland (30–3)	5.
6.	Ohio State	Florida State (0-0)	Maryland (3-0)	Texas (5-0)	Texas (7-0)T	Maryland (10-0)	Maryland (11-0)	Maryland (11-0)	Baylor (14-1)	Baylor (14-1)	Texas (16-1)	Texas (18-1)	Texas (20-1)	Texas (21-1)	Maryland (23–3)	Maryland (25–3)	Texas (26–2)	Oregon State (28–4)	Oregon State (28–4)	6.
7.	Florida State	Ohio State (0-1)	Oregon State (3-0)	Oregon State (5-0)	Oregon State (6-0)	Oregon State (7-0)	Kentucky (10-0)	Kentucky (10-0)	Mississippi State (14-1)	Mississippi State (16-1)	Ohio State (13-4)	Ohio State (15-4)	Ohio State (16-4)	Ohio State (18-4)	Oregon State (22–3)	Oregon State (24–3)	Louisville (24–6)	Texas (28–3)	Texas (28–3)	7.
8.	Louisville	Maryland (1-0)	Mississippi State (2-0)T	Tennessee (5-1)	Kentucky (7-0)	Kentucky (9-0)	Mississippi State (10-1)	Mississippi State (11-1)	Maryland (12-2)	Maryland (14-2)	Arizona State (15-3)	Arizona State (17-3)	Arizona State (18-3)	Oregon State (20-3)	Texas (22–2)	Texas (24–2)	Oregon State (25–4)	Louisville (25–7)	Louisville (25–7)	8.
9.	Maryland	Oregon State (1-0)	Texas (3-0)T	Mississippi State (5-0)	Mississippi State (6-1)	Mississippi State (7-1)	Ohio State (7-3)	Ohio State (8-3)	Stanford (11-2)	Kentucky (13-1)	Kentucky (14-2)	Oregon State (16-3)	Oregon State (17-3)	Arizona State (20-4)	Arizona State (22–4)	Arizona State (24–4)	Ohio State (23–6)	Ohio State (24–7)	Ohio State (24–7)	9.
10.	Oregon State	Mississippi State (1-0)	Texas A&M (4-0)	Ohio State (4-2)	Ohio State (5-3)	Ohio State (6-3)	Florida State (9-2)	Oregon State (9-1)	Kentucky (10-0)	Arizona State (12-3)	Mississippi State (16-2)	Texas A&M (14-5)	Florida State (18-4)	Florida State (19-4)	Florida State (21–4)	Louisville (22–6)	Arizona State (25–5)	UCLA (24–8)	UCLA (24–8)	10.
11.	Mississippi State	Texas (1-0)	Ohio State (2-2)	Kentucky (6-0)	Florida State (7-1)	Florida State (7-2)	Oregon State (8-1)	Stanford (9-2)	Oregon State (10-2)	Stanford (13-3)	Oregon State (14-3)	Florida State (16-4)	Mississippi State (19-4)	Mississippi State (21-4)	Louisville (19–6)	Texas A&M (20–7)	Stanford (24–6)	Arizona State (25–6)	Arizona State (25–6)	11.
12.	Texas	Texas A&M (2-0)	Kentucky (4-0)	Texas A&M (5-1)	Northwestern (8-0)	Northwestern (9-0)	Stanford (8-2)	Duke (9-3)	Tennessee (9-3)	Oregon State (12-3)	Stanford (14-4)	Kentucky (14-3)	Texas A&M (15-6)	Louisville (18-6)	Texas A&M (17–7) T	Florida State (21–5)	UCLA (22–7)	Kentucky (23–7)	Kentucky (23–7)	12.
13.	Texas A&M	Kentucky (2-0)	Stanford (3-0)	Florida State (5-1)	Duke (7-2)	Duke (7-2)	Duke (9-3)	Tennessee (8-3)	Texas A&M (9-3)	Tennessee (11-4)	Texas A&M (13-5)	Mississippi State (17-4)	Louisville (17-5)	Stanford (19-5)	UCLA (19–6) T	Stanford (22–6)	Kentucky (21–6)	Stanford (24–7)	Stanford (24–7)	13.
14.	Duke	Duke (2-0)	Florida State (2-1)	Duke (6-1)	Stanford (6-1)	Tennessee (7-2)	Tennessee (8-3)	Northwestern (11-1)	Arizona State (10-3)	Oklahoma (12-3)	Florida State (14-4)	Louisville (14-5)	UCLA (16-5)	UCLA (17-6)	Mississippi State (21–5)	UCLA (20–7)	Florida State (23–6)	Syracuse (25–7)	Syracuse (25–7)	14.
15.	Arizona State	Stanford (2-0)	Duke (3-1)	Northwestern (6-0)	Texas A&M (6-2)	Stanford (6-2)	Northwestern (10-1)	Florida State (9-3)	UCLA (10-3)	Texas A&M (12-4)	South Florida (12-4)	UCLA (14-5)	Stanford (17-5)	Texas A&M (16-7)	Stanford (20–6)	Kentucky (19–6)	Texas A&M (21–8)	Mississippi State (26–7)	Mississippi State (26–7)	15.
16.	Stanford	Louisville (0-1)	Arizona State (1-1)T	Stanford (6-1)	Tennessee (6-2)	DePaul (7-3)	Texas A&M (7-3)	Texas A&M (9-3)	Northwestern (12-2)	Florida State (11-4)	Miami (17-2)	Stanford (15-5)	Miami (18-3)	Florida (19-4)	Kentucky (17–6)	Mississippi State (22–6)	Mississippi State (24–6)	Michigan State (24–8)	Michigan State (24–8)	16.
17.	Oklahoma	Oklahoma (1-0)	California (4-0)T	Arizona State (3-2)	Oklahoma (7-1)	Oklahoma (9-1)	DePaul (8-4)	Arizona State (8-3)	Oklahoma (10-3)	UCLA (11-4)	Louisville (14-5)	Miami (17-3)	Michigan State (16-4)	Michigan State (18-5)	Oklahoma State (19–5)	Miami (22–5)	Syracuse (23–6)	Florida State (23–7)	Florida State (23–7)	17.
18.	Kentucky	Arizona State (0-1)	South Florida (2-0)	California (5-1)	DePaul (6-2)	Texas A&M (7-3)	Oklahoma (9-2)	Oklahoma (9-2)	Duke (11-4)	Michigan State (12-3)	Tennessee (11-4)	Michigan State (14-4)	Kentucky (15-5)	Kentucky (16-6)	Miami (21–5)	Syracuse (22–6)	DePaul (24–7)	DePaul (25–7)	Texas A&M (21–9)	18.
19.	Northwestern	South Florida (2-0)	Northwestern (3-0)	Michigan State (4-1)	Syracuse (5-2)	UCLA (5-2)	UCLA (7-2)	California (8-2)	Florida State (10-4)	South Florida (8-3)	Oklahoma (12-4)	Tennessee (12-6)	South Florida (15-5)	Miami (20-4)	South Florida (18–6)	DePaul (23–7)	Michigan State (22–7)	Texas A&M (21–9)	Miami (24–8)	19.
20.	South Florida	Northwestern (1-0)	Michigan State (3-0)	Syracuse (4-1)	UCLA (4-2)	South Florida (6-2)	South Florida (7-2)	South Florida (7-2)	Missouri (13-0)	Florida (15-2)	UCLA (12-5)	South Florida (13-5)	Oklahoma (15-5)	Oklahoma State (18-4)	Oklahoma (17–7)	Michigan State (20–7)	South Florida (21–7)	Miami (24–8)	DePaul (25–8)	20.
21.	George Washington	California (2-0)	Oklahoma (3-1)	Oklahoma (5-1)	South Florida (5-2)	Arizona State (5-3)	California (7-2)	UCLA (7-3)	California (9-3)	Miami (15-2)	Michigan State (13-4)	Oklahoma (13-5)	Missouri (18-4)	Oklahoma (16-6)	DePaul (21–7)	South Florida (19–7)	Miami (22–7)	South Florida (23–8)	South Florida (23–9)	21.
22.	North Carolina	George Washington (1-0)	Louisville (0-2)	Seton Hall (7-0)	California (6-2)	California (7-2)T	Arizona State (7-3)	Miami (11-1)	South Florida (8-3)	Duke (12-5)	Florida (15-3)	Missouri (16-4)	Florida (18-4)	South Florida (16-6)	Florida (19–6)	Oklahoma State (19–7)	Colorado State (26–1)T	Colorado State (28–1)	Colorado State (31–1)	22.
23.	Syracuse	Michigan State (1-0)	Syracuse (1-1)	DePaul (5-1)	Iowa (8-1)	Miami (10-0)	Miami (11-1)	Missouri (12-0)	Michigan State (10-3)	Louisville (12-5)	Missouri (15-3)	DePaul (16-6)	Tennessee (13-8)	DePaul (19-7)	Syracuse (20–6)	Oklahoma (18–8)	West Virginia (22–8)T	West Virginia (24–9)	West Virginia (24–9)	23.
24.	Michigan State	Chattanooga (2-0)	George Washington (2-1)	South Florida (3-2)	Arizona State (4-3)	Michigan State (7-2)	Michigan State (8-2)	Michigan State (9-2)	DePaul (10-5)	Missouri (14-2)	DePaul (14-6)	West Virginia (16-4)	Washington (16-5)	West Virginia (18-6)	Tennessee (15–9)	Missouri (21–6)	Oklahoma (19–9)	Oklahoma (21–10)	Oklahoma (21–10)	24.
25.	Chattanooga	Syracuse (1-0)	Iowa (4-0)	UCLA (3-2)	Michigan State (5-2)	St. John's (8-1)	Missouri (11-0)	DePaul (8-4)	Seton Hall (13-1)	USC (14-2)	West Virginia (15-4)	Washington (15-4)	Oklahoma State (16-4)	Tennessee (14-9)	Michigan State (18–7)	Colorado State (24–1)	Florida (22–7)	Florida (22–8)	Florida (22–8)	25.
	Preseason Nov. 10	Week 2 Nov. 17	Week 3 Nov. 24	Week 4 Dec. 1	Week 5 Dec. 8	Week 6 Dec. 15	Week 7 Dec. 22	Week 8 Dec. 28	Week 9 Jan. 4	Week 10 Jan. 11	Week 11 Jan. 18	Week 12 Jan. 25	Week 13 Feb. 1	Week 14 Feb. 8	Week 15 Feb. 15	Week 16 Feb. 22	Week 17 Feb. 29	Week 18 Mar. 7	Week 19 Mar. 14	
		Dropped: North Carolina (0-2)	Dropped: Chattanooga (3-1)	Dropped: Louisville (1–4); George Washington (5–2); Iowa (6-1)	Dropped: Seton Hall (7-1)	Dropped: Iowa, Syracuse	Dropped: St. John's	None	Dropped: Miami	Dropped: Northwestern; California; DePaul; Seton Hall	Dropped: USC; Duke	Dropped: Florida	Dropped: West Virginia; DePaul	Dropped: Missouri; Washington	Dropped: West Virginia	Dropped: Florida; Tennessee	Dropped: Oklahoma State; Missouri	None	None	

== USA Today Coaches Poll ==
The Coaches Poll is the second oldest poll still in use after the AP Poll. It is compiled by a rotating group of 32 college Division I head coaches. The Poll operates by Borda count. Each voting member ranks teams from 1 to 25. Each team then receives points for their ranking in reverse order: Number 1 earns 25 points, number 2 earns 24 points, and so forth. The points are then combined and the team with the highest points is then ranked #1; second highest is ranked #2 and so forth. Only the top 25 teams with points are ranked, with teams receiving first place votes noted the quantity next to their name. The maximum points a single team can receive is 800.

	Preseason Nov. 2	Week 2 Nov. 16	Week 3 Nov. 23	Week 4 Dec. 1	Week 5 Dec. 8	Week 6 Dec. 14	Week 7 Dec. 21	Week 8 Dec. 28	Week 9 Jan. 4	Week 10 Jan. 11	Week 11 Jan. 18	Week 12 Jan. 25	Week 13 Feb. 1	Week 14 Feb. 8	Week 15 Feb. 15	Week 16 Feb. 22	Week 17 Feb. 29	Week 18 Mar. 7	Week 19 Mar. 14	Final	
1.	Connecticut (32)	Connecticut (1–0) (32)	Connecticut (2–0) (32)	Connecticut (4–0) (32)	Connecticut (6–0) (32)	Connecticut (8–0) (32)	Connecticut (9–0) (32)	Connecticut (10–0) (32)	Connecticut (11–0) (32)	Connecticut (14–0) (32)	Connecticut (16–0) (32)	Connecticut (18–0) (31)	Connecticut (20–0) (32)	Connecticut (23–0) (32)	Connecticut (24–0) (32)	Connecticut (26–0) (32)	Connecticut (29–0) (32)	Connecticut (32–0) (32)	Connecticut (32–0) (32)	Connecticut (32–0) (32)	1.
2.	South Carolina	South Carolina (2–0)	South Carolina (4–0)	South Carolina (7–0)	South Carolina (8–0)	South Carolina (9–0)	South Carolina (11–0)	South Carolina (12–0)	South Carolina (13–0)	South Carolina (15–0)	South Carolina (17–0)	South Carolina (19–0) (1)	South Carolina (21–0)	South Carolina (22–1)	South Carolina (24–1)	South Carolina (26–1)	South Carolina (28–1)	South Carolina (31–1)	South Carolina (31–1)	Oregon State (32–5)	2.
3.	Notre Dame	Notre Dame (1–0)	Notre Dame (4–0)	Notre Dame (6–0)	Notre Dame (7–1)	Notre Dame (9–1)	Notre Dame (10–1)	Notre Dame (11–1)	Notre Dame (13–1)	Notre Dame (15–1)	Notre Dame (17–1)	Notre Dame (19–1)	Notre Dame (21–1)	Notre Dame (23–1)	Notre Dame (24–1)	Notre Dame (26–1)	Notre Dame (28–1)	Notre Dame (31–1)	Notre Dame (31–1)	Syracuse (30–8)	3.
4.	Tennessee	Baylor (2–0)	Baylor (4–0)	Baylor (6–0)	Baylor (9–0)	Baylor (10–0)	Baylor (13–0)	Baylor (13–0)	Texas (13–0)	Texas (15–0)	Baylor (18–1)	Baylor (19–1)	Baylor (21–1)	Baylor (23–1)	Baylor (25–1)	Baylor (28–1)	Baylor (30–1)	Baylor (33–1)	Baylor (33–1)	Baylor (36–2)	4.
5.	Baylor	Tennessee (1–0)	Tennessee (4–0)	Maryland (6–0)	Maryland (8–0)	Maryland (10–0)	Maryland (11–0)	Maryland (11–1)	Ohio State (10–3)	Ohio State (12–3)	Maryland (16–2)	Maryland (17–2)	Maryland (19–2)	Texas (21–1)	Ohio State (21–4)	Ohio State (23–4)	Maryland (27–3)	Maryland (30–3)	Maryland (30–3)	South Carolina (33–2)	5.
6.	Maryland	Maryland (1–0)	Maryland (3–0)	Texas (5–0)	Texas (7–0)	Texas (8–0)	Texas (10–0)	Texas (11–0)	Mississippi State (14–1)	Mississippi State (16–1)	Texas (16–1)	Texas (18–1)	Texas (20–1)	Ohio State (19–4)	Maryland (23–3)	Maryland (25–3)	Louisville (24–6)	Oregon State (28–4)	Oregon State (28–4)	Notre Dame (33–2)	6.
7.	Florida State	Oregon State (2–0)	Oregon State (3–0)	Oregon State (5–0)	Oregon State (6–0)	Oregon State (7–0)	Kentucky (10–0)	Kentucky (11–0)	Baylor (14–1)	Baylor (16–1)	Ohio State (13–4)	Ohio State (15–4)	Ohio State (17–4)	Maryland (21–3)	Texas (22–2)	Oregon State (24–3)	Texas (26–3)	Texas (28–4)	Texas (28–4)	Texas (31–5)	7.
8.	Louisville	Texas (1–0)	Texas (3–0)	Tennessee (5–1)	Kentucky (7–0)	Kentucky (9–0)	Mississippi State (11–1)	Mississippi State (11–1)	Maryland (12–2)	Maryland (14–2)	Oregon State (14–3)	Oregon State (16–3)	Oregon State (18–3)	Oregon State (20–3)	Oregon State (22–3)	Texas (24–2)	Oregon State (25–4)	Louisville (25–7)	Louisville (25–7)	Washington (26–11)	8.
9.	Oregon State	Duke (2–0)	Texas A&M (4–0)	Mississippi State (5–0)	Florida State (7–1)	Mississippi State (7–1)	Oregon State (9–1)	Ohio State (8–3)	Kentucky (11–1)	Kentucky (13–1)	Kentucky (14–2)	Arizona State (17–3)	Florida State (18–4)	Florida State (19–4)	Florida State (21–4)	Arizona State (24–4)	Ohio State (23–6)	Ohio State (24–7)	Ohio State (24–7)	Maryland (31–4)	9.
10.	Ohio State	Stanford (2–0)	Mississippi State (2–0)	Kentucky (6–0)	Mississippi State (6–1)	Florida State (7–2)	Ohio State (8–3)	Oregon State (9–2)	Texas A&M (11–3)	Oregon State (12–3)	Mississippi State (17–2)	Texas A&M (14–5)	Arizona State (18–4)	Arizona State (20–4)	Arizona State (22–4)	Louisville (22–6)	Florida State (23–6)	Florida State (23–7)	Florida State (23–7)	Ohio State (26–8)	10.
11.	Texas	Mississippi State (1–0)	Kentucky (4–0)	Texas A&M (5–1)	Duke (7–2)	Duke (8–2)	Stanford (8–2)	Stanford (10–2)	Tennessee (10–3)	Texas A&M (12–4)	Arizona State (15–3)	Florida State (16–4)	Texas A&M (15–6)	Mississippi State (21–4)	Louisville (20–6)	Texas A&M (20–7)	Arizona State (25–5)	Arizona State (25–6)	Arizona State (25–6)	Stanford (27–8)	11.
12.	Duke	Texas A&M (2–0)	Duke (3–1)	Ohio State (4–2)	Stanford (6–1)	Ohio State (6–3)	Duke (9–3)	Duke (9–3)	Oregon State (10–3)	Stanford (13–3)	Texas A&M (13–5)	Kentucky (15–3)	Mississippi State (19–4)	Louisville (18–6)	Texas A&M (18–7)	Florida State (21–6)	Stanford (24–6)	UCLA (24–8)	UCLA (24–8)	Florida State (25–8)	12.
13.	Mississippi State	Kentucky (2–0)	Florida State (2–1)	Duke (6–1)	Ohio State (5–3)	Northwestern (9–0)	Florida State (9–3)	Florida State (10–3) T	Stanford (11–3)	Arizona State (13–3)	Florida State (14–4)	Mississippi State (17–4)	Louisville (17–5)	Texas A&M (16–7)	Mississippi State (21–5)	Stanford (22–6)	Kentucky (21–6)	Kentucky (23–7)	Kentucky (23–7)	UCLA (26–9)	13.
14.	Stanford	Florida State (0–1)T	Ohio State (2–2)	Florida State (5–1)	Northwestern (8–0)	Stanford (6–2)	Texas A&M (8–3)	Texas A&M (9–3) T	Arizona State (11–3)	Florida State (12–4)	Stanford (14–4)	Louisville (15–5)	Michigan State (16–4)	Stanford (19–5)	UCLA (19–6)	Kentucky (19–6)	UCLA (22–7)	Mississippi State (26–7)	Mississippi State (26–7)	Louisville (25–7)	14.
15.	Arizona State	Ohio State (0–2)T	California (4–0)	Stanford (6–1)	Tennessee (6–2)	DePaul (7–3)	Northwestern (10–1)	Northwestern (11–1)	Florida State (10–4)	Tennessee (11–4)	South Florida (12–4)	Michigan State (14–4)	Stanford (17–5)	Michigan State (18–5)	Stanford (20–6)	UCLA (20–7)	Texas A&M (21–8)	Syracuse (25–7)	Syracuse (25–7)	Kentucky (25–8)	15.
16.	Texas A&M	Louisville (0–1)	Stanford (3–1)	Northwestern (6–0)	Texas A&M (7–2)	Tennessee (7–2)	Tennessee (8–3)	Tennessee (8–3)	Duke (11–4)	South Florida (10–4)	Miami (17–2)	Stanford (15–5)	UCLA (16–5)	UCLA (17–6)	Kentucky (17–6)	Mississippi State (22–6)	Mississippi State (24–6)	Stanford (24–7)	Stanford (24–7)	Arizona State (26–7)	16.
17.	Kentucky	South Florida (2–0)	South Florida (2–1)	California (5–1)	DePaul (6–2)	Oklahoma (9–1)	South Florida (7–2)	South Florida (7–2)	Northwestern (12–2)	Oklahoma (12–3)	Louisville (14–5)	Miami (17–3)	South Florida (15–5)	Miami (20–4)	Miami (21–5)	Miami (22–5)	Syracuse (23–6)	Michigan State (24–8)	Michigan State (24–8)	DePaul (27–9)	17.
18.	Oklahoma	Arizona State (0–1)	Arizona State (1–1)	DePaul (5–1)	Oklahoma (7–1)	Texas A&M (7–3)	California (8–2)	California (8–2)	South Florida (8–3)	Michigan State (12–3)	Michigan State (13–4)	South Florida (13–5)	Kentucky (15–5)	Kentucky (16–6)	Syracuse (20–6)	Syracuse (22–6)	DePaul (24–7)	Texas A&M (21–9)	Texas A&M (21–9)	Mississippi State (28–8)	18.
19.	South Florida	DePaul (2–0)	Northwestern (3–0)	Arizona State (3–2)	Iowa (8–1)	South Florida (6–2)	Oklahoma (9–2)	Oklahoma (9–2)	Oklahoma (10–3)	Duke (12–5)	Oklahoma (12–4)	UCLA (14–5)	Oklahoma (15–5)	Florida (19–4)	DePaul (21–7)	DePaul (23–7)	Michigan State (22–7)	Miami (24–8)	Miami (24–8)	Tennessee (22–14)	19.
20.	North Carolina	George Washington (1–0)	DePaul (3–1)	Michigan State (4–1)	South Florida (5–2)	California (7–2)	Miami (11–1)	Miami (12–1)	Seton Hall (13–1)	Miami (15–2)	Northwestern (13–5)	Oklahoma (13–5)	Miami (18–4)	South Florida (16–6)	South Florida (18–7)	South Florida (19–7)	South Florida (21–8)	South Florida (23–9)	South Florida (23–9)	Texas A&M (22–10)	20.
21.	George Washington	California (2–0)	Iowa (4–0)	Seton Hall (7–0)	California (6–2)	Miami (10–0)	Arizona State (8–3)	Arizona State (9–3)	UCLA (11–3)	Florida (14–2)	DePaul (14–6)	DePaul (16–6)	Missouri (18–4)	Oklahoma (16–6)	Oklahoma (17–7)	Michigan State (20–7)	Miami (22–7)	DePaul (25–8)	DePaul (25–8)	Michigan State (25–9)	21.
22.	DePaul	Northwestern (1–0)	Michigan State (3–0)	Oklahoma (5–1)	Miami (10–0)	Michigan State (7–2)	Michigan State (9–2)	Michigan State (9–2)	Michigan State (10–3)	Louisville (12–5)	Tennessee (11–6)	Green Bay (17–2)	Florida (18–4)	Syracuse (18–6)	Michigan State (18–7)	BYU (23–4)	Oklahoma (19–9)	Colorado State (28–1)	Colorado State (28–1)	South Florida (24–10)	22.
23.	Iowa	Iowa (2–0)	George Washington (3–1)	South Florida (3–2)	Michigan State (5–2)	Arizona State (6–3)	DePaul (8–5)	Seton Hall (10–1)	Iowa (12–2)	UCLA (11–4)	Florida (15–3)	Tennessee (12–7)	Syracuse (16–6)	DePaul (19–7)	Duquesne (23–2)	Oklahoma (18–9)	Colorado State (26–1)	Oklahoma (21–10)	Oklahoma (21–10)	Oklahoma (22–11)	23.
24.	Northwestern	Oklahoma (1–1)T	Oklahoma (3–1)	Iowa (6–1)	Arizona State (4–3)	Iowa (8–2)	Seton Hall (10–1)	DePaul (8–5)	DePaul (10–5)	Northwestern (12–4)	Syracuse (14–4)	Missouri (16–4)	DePaul (17–7)	Duquesne (21–2)	Oklahoma State (19–5)	Missouri (21–6)	Florida (22–7)	BYU (26–5)	Florida (22–8)	Miami (24–9)	24.
25.	Princeton	Princeton (2–0)T	Seton Hall (4–0)	Syracuse (4–1)	Syracuse (5–2)	Seton Hall (9–1)	Iowa (9–2)	Iowa (10–2)	Syracuse (11–3)	DePaul (12–6) T Duquesne (15–2) T	UCLA (12–5)	Seton Hall (16–4)	Tennessee (13–8)	Oklahoma State (18–4)	Florida (19–6)	Colorado State (24–1)	UTEP (25–2)	Florida (22–8)	St. John's (23–9) West Virginia (24–9)	West Virginia (25–10)	25.
	Preseason Nov. 2	Week 2 Nov. 16	Week 3 Nov. 23	Week 4 Dec. 1	Week 5 Dec. 8	Week 6 Dec. 14	Week 7 Dec. 21	Week 8 Dec. 28	Week 9 Jan. 4	Week 10 Jan. 11	Week 11 Jan. 18	Week 12 Jan. 25	Week 13 Feb. 1	Week 14 Feb. 8	Week 15 Feb. 15	Week 16 Feb. 22	Week 17 Feb. 29	Week 18 Mar. 7	Week 19 Mar. 14	Final	
		Dropped: North Carolina (0-2)	Dropped: Louisville (0–2); Princeton (2–1)	Dropped: George Washington (5–2)	Dropped: Seton Hall (7–1)	Dropped: Syracuse	None	None	Dropped: California; Miami	Dropped: Seton Hall; Iowa; Syracuse	Dropped: Duke; Duquesne	Dropped: Northwestern; Florida; Syracuse	Dropped: Green Bay; Seton Hall	Dropped: Missouri; Tennessee	None	Dropped: Duquesne; Oklahoma State; Florida	Dropped: BYU; Missouri	Dropped: UTEP	Dropped: BYU	Dropped: Colorado State; Florida; St. John's	

== See also ==
- 2015–16 NCAA Division I men's basketball rankings
