= 2015–16 Texas A&M–Corpus Christi Islanders women's basketball team =

Intercollegiate basketball season

2015–16 Texas A&M–Corpus Christi Islanders women's basketball
- Conference: Southland Conference
- Record: 9–20 (6–12 Southland)
- Head coach: Royce Chadwick (4th season)
- Assistant coaches: Roxanne White; Darren Brunson
- Home arena: American Bank Center; Dugan Wellness Center

2015–16 Southland Conference women's basketball standings
	Conf.				Overall
Team	W		L	PCT	W		L	PCT
Abilene Christian*	17	–	1	.944	26	–	4	.867
Central Arkansas †	16	–	2	.889	28	–	4	.875
Northwestern State	13	–	5	.722	19	–	12	.613
Stephen F. Austin	12	–	6	.667	18	–	12	.600
McNeese State	11	–	7	.611	20	–	13	.606
Houston Baptist	9	–	9	.500	14	–	15	.483
Nicholls State	8	–	10	.444	10	–	19	.345
Sam Houston State	7	–	11	.389	14	–	18	.438
Lamar	7	–	11	.389	12	–	19	.387
Texas A&M–CC	6	–	12	.333	9	–	20	.310
New Orleans	5	–	13	.278	8	–	19	.296
Incarnate Word*	3	–	15	.167	6	–	23	.207
SE Louisiana	3	–	15	.167	4	–	25	.138
† 2016 Southland tournament winner As of March 18, 2016 *ineligible for postseason play due to Div. I transition Rankings from AP poll

The 2015–16 Texas A&M–Corpus Christi Islanders women's basketball team represented Texas A&M University–Corpus Christi in the 2015–16 NCAA Division I women's basketball season. The Islanders were led by fourth-year head coach Royce Chadwick. They played their home games at the American Bank Center and the Dugan Wellness Center, both in Corpus Christi, Texas, and were members of the Southland Conference. They finished the season 9–20, 6–12 in Southland play, to finish in tenth place. They failed to qualify for the Southland women's tournament.

== Media ==
Video streaming of all non-televised home games and audio for all road games were available at GoIslanders.com.

== Roster ==
2015–16 Texas A&M–Corpus Christi Islanders women's basketball team
Players
Coaches

Pos.	#	Name	Height	Year	Previous school	Hometown
G	1	Jennifer Ramirez	5 ft 6 in (1.68 m)	Sr	ASA College	The Bronx, NY
F	4	Camesha Davis	6 ft 1 in (1.85 m)	Jr	Desoto HS	DeSoto, TX
F	5	Uri Jolivette	5 ft 10 in (1.78 m)	Fr	New iberia Senior HS	New Iberia, LA
G	10	Shay Weaver	5 ft 9 in (1.75 m)	Sr	Marshall HS	Arlington, TX
G	11	Kassie Jones	5 ft 7 in (1.7 m)	Jr	Lufkin HS	Lufkin, TX
G	14	Shola Adebayo	5 ft 8 in (1.73 m)	RS Sr	Eastern Oklahoma State CC	Oklahoma City, OK
G	15	Brittany Mbamalu	5 ft 8 in (1.73 m)	RS So	Dulles HS	Houston, TX
C	21	Kre'Ana Henry	5 ft 11 in (1.8 m)	Jr	Moberly Area CC	Toledo, OH
F	22	Ashanti Plummer	6 ft 2 in (1.88 m)	Sr	NYC Museum HS	Manhattan, NY
F	23	Gee Lawler	6 ft 1 in (1.85 m)	Sr	San Jacinto JC	Bloomfield Hills, MI
G	30	Sydney-Anne Cottrell	5 ft 4 in (1.63 m)	Fr	William B. Travis HS	Sugar Land, TX
F	33	Maddisen Turner	6 ft 0 in (1.83 m)	Fr	Westside HS	Houston, TX

Head coach

- Royce Chadwick (Southwestern Oklahoma State)

Assistant coach(es)

- Roxanne White (Stephen F. Austin)
- Darren Brunson (St. Mary's (TX))

Legend

- (C) Team captain
- (S) Suspended
- (I) Ineligible
- (W) Walk-on
- Injured
- Current redshirt

Roster
Last update: September 23, 2024

== Schedule and results ==
Date time, TV	Rank^{#}	Opponent^{#}	Result	Record	Site (attendance) city, state
Exhibition
November 5, 2015*; 7:00 p.m.		Texas A&M International	W 70–45		Dugan Wellness Center (502); Corpus Christi, TX
Non-conference regular season
November 13, 2015*; 5:00 p.m.		Cal Poly; Islanders Classic	L 45–56	0–1	American Bank Center (515); Corpus Christi, TX
November 14, 2015*; 7:00 p.m.		East Carolina; Islanders Classic	L 46–82	0–2	American Bank Center (513); Corpus Christi, TX
November 18, 2015*; 7:00 p.m.		Rice	W 60–55	1–2	Dugan Wellness Center (617); Corpus Christi, TX
November 23, 2015*; 7:00 p.m.		Western New Mexico	W 57–42	2–2	American Bank Center; Corpus Christi, TX
December 1, 2015*; 7:00 p.m.		Texas–Rio Grande Valley	W 49–46	3–2	Dugan Wellness Center (613); Corpus Christi, TX
December 11, 2015*; 7:00 p.m.		Angelo State	L 80–85	3–3	Dugan Wellness Center (431); Corpus Christi, TX
December 11, 2015*; 7:00 p.m.		UNLV	L 51–65	3–4	Dugan Wellness Center (327); Corpus Christi, TX
December 17, 2015*; 7:00 p.m.		Houston	L 73–76	3–5	Dugan Wellness Center (457); Corpus Christi, TX
December 19, 2015*; 6:30 p.m.		at Texas Southern	L 43–51	3–6	Health and Physical Education Arena (272); Houston, TX
December 29, 2015*; 12:00 p.m.		at Fordham; Fordham Holiday Classic semifinals	L 49–67	3–7	Rose Hill Gymnasium; The Bronx, NY
December 30, 2015*; 12:00 p.m.		vs. New Mexico State; Fordham Holiday Classic 3rd-place game	L 51–70	3–8	Rose Hill Gymnasium; The Bronx, NY
Southland regular season
January 5, 2016; 5:30 p.m.		Central Arkansas	L 55–66	3–9 (0–1)	American Bank Center (465); Corpus Christi, TX
January 7, 2016; 7:00 p.m., ESPN3		at Lamar	L 60–65	3–10 (0–2)	Montagne Center (538); Beaumont, TX
January 9, 2016; 1:00 p.m.		at McNeese State	L 51–72	3–11 (0–3)	Burton Coliseum (680); Lake Charles, LA
January 13, 2016; 6:30 p.m.		at Northwestern State	L 43–60	3–12 (0–4)	Prather Coliseum (1,013); Natchitoches, LA
January 16, 2016; 4:30 p.m.		Nicholls State	L 62–64 ^{OT}	3–13 (0–5)	American Bank Center (417); Corpus Christi, TX
January 21, 2016; 7:00 p.m.		Southeastern Louisiana	W 69–67	4–13 (1–5)	Dugan Wellness Center (457); Corpus Christi, TX
January 23, 2016; 4:30 p.m.		New Orleans	W 73–59	5–13 (2–5)	American Bank Center (403); Corpus Christi, TX
January 27, 2016; 6:00 p.m.		at Incarnate Word	W 57–56	6–13 (3–5)	McDermott Center (435); San Antonio, TX
January 30, 2016; 11:30 a.m., ESPN3		Stephen F. Austin	L 66–71	6–14 (3–6)	American Bank Center (704); Corpus Christi, TX
February 3, 2016; 7:00 p.m.		Houston Baptist	L 59–73	6–15 (3–7)	Dugan Wellness Center (737); Corpus Christi, TX
February 6, 2016; 2:00 p.m.		Sam Houston State	W 81–71	7–15 (4–7)	American Bank Center (865); Corpus Christi, TX
February 11, 2016; 7:00 p.m.		at New Orleans	W 75–64	8–15 (5–7)	Lakefront Arena (251); New Orleans, LA
February 13, 2016; 3:30 p.m., ESPN3		at Stephen F. Austin	L 59–72	8–16 (5–8)	William R. Johnson Coliseum (3,947); Nacogdoches, TX
February 17, 2016; 7:00 p.m.		Abilene Christian	L 65–71	8–17 (5–9)	Dugan Wellness Center (457); Corpus Christi, TX
February 20, 2016; 4:00 p.m.		Incarnate Word	W 69–55	9–17 (6–9)	Dugan Wellness Center (520); Corpus Christi, TX
February 27, 2016; 4:30 p.m., ESPN3		at Sam Houston State	L 57–75	9–18 (6–10)	Bernard Johnson Coliseum (435); Huntsville, TX
March 3, 2016; 5:00 p.m., ESPN3		at Houston Baptist	L 51–55	9–19 (6–11)	Sharp Gymnasium (622); Houston, TX
March 5, 2016; 2:00 p.m.		at Abilene Christian	L 52–63	9–20 (6–12)	Moody Coliseum (1,336); Abilene, TX
*Non-conference game. ^{#}Rankings from AP poll. (#) Tournament seedings in parentheses.

== See also ==
- 2015–16 Texas A&M–Corpus Christi Islanders men's basketball team
