= 2015–16 Southeastern Louisiana Lady Lions basketball team =

Intercollegiate basketball season

2015–16 Southeastern Louisiana Lady Lions basketball
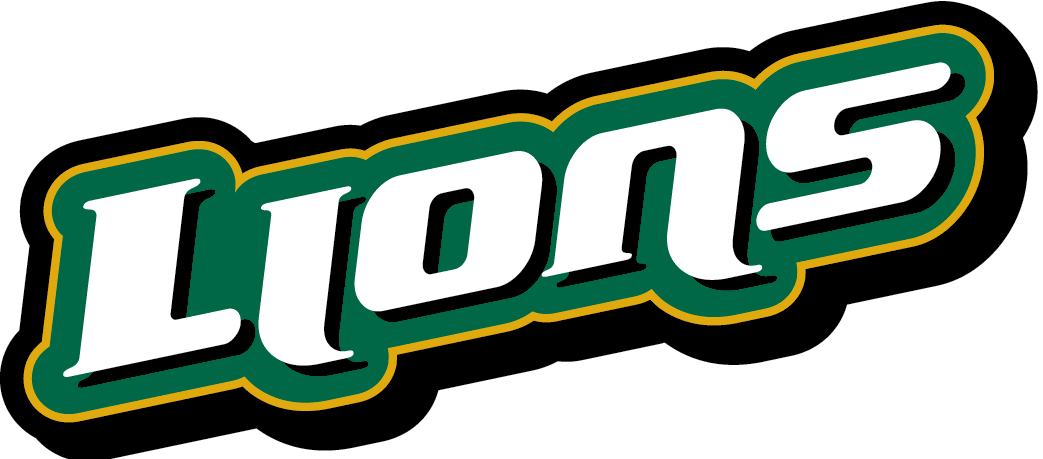
- Conference: Southland Conference
- Record: 4–25 (3–15 Southland)
- Head coach: Yolanda Moore (2nd season)
- Assistant coaches: Levar Willis; Ayriell Robinson; Aja Gibson
- Home arena: University Center

2015–16 Southland Conference women's basketball standings
	Conf.				Overall
Team	W		L	PCT	W		L	PCT
Abilene Christian*	17	–	1	.944	26	–	4	.867
Central Arkansas †	16	–	2	.889	28	–	4	.875
Northwestern State	13	–	5	.722	19	–	12	.613
Stephen F. Austin	12	–	6	.667	18	–	12	.600
McNeese State	11	–	7	.611	20	–	13	.606
Houston Baptist	9	–	9	.500	14	–	15	.483
Nicholls State	8	–	10	.444	10	–	19	.345
Sam Houston State	7	–	11	.389	14	–	18	.438
Lamar	7	–	11	.389	12	–	19	.387
Texas A&M–CC	6	–	12	.333	9	–	20	.310
New Orleans	5	–	13	.278	8	–	19	.296
Incarnate Word*	3	–	15	.167	6	–	23	.207
SE Louisiana	3	–	15	.167	4	–	25	.138
† 2016 Southland tournament winner As of March 18, 2016 *ineligible for postseason play due to Div. I transition Rankings from AP poll

The 2015–16 Southeastern Louisiana Lady Lions basketball team represented Southeastern Louisiana University during the 2015–16 NCAA Division I women's basketball season. The Lady Lions, led by second-year head coach Yolanda Moore, played their home games at the University Center. They were members of the Southland Conference. They finished the season 4–25, 3–15 in Southland play to finish in a tie for twelfth place. They failed to qualify for the Southland women's tournament.

== Roster ==
2015–16 Southeastern Louisiana Lions women's basketball team
Players
Coaches

Pos.	#	Name	Height	Year	Previous school	Hometown
G	1	Taylin Underwood	5 ft 7 in (1.7 m)	So	Doyle HS	Livingston, LA
G	2	Asia Vetter	5 ft 2 in (1.57 m)	So	Marietta HS; Georgia Perimeter College	Houston, TX
G	3	Peaches Anderson	5 ft 8 in (1.73 m)	Sr	Meridian HS; Michigan	Meridian, MS
G	10	Baylie Stears	6 ft 0 in (1.83 m)	Fr	Walker HS	Walker, LA
F	11	Kyle Felton	6 ft 3 in (1.91 m)	Fr	Columbus HS	Atlanta, GA
F	12	Chambria Harrison	6 ft 1 in (1.85 m)	Fr	Vidalia HS	Vidalia, GA
G	13	Erica Hernandez	5 ft 9 in (1.75 m)	Sr	Floresville HS	Floresville, TX
G	15	KaeLynn Boyd	5 ft 5 in (1.65 m)	Sr	Hahnville HS; Texas–Pan American	Boutte, LA
F	20	Dani Fielder	5 ft 11 in (1.8 m)	Jr	Cypress Creek HS	Houston, TX
F	22	Chev Stewart	6 ft 1 in (1.85 m)	Jr	Wylie HS	Wylie, TX
G	23	Jaclyn Scholvin	5 ft 7 in (1.7 m)	Fr	Fontainebleau HS	Mandeville, LA
G	33	Bre Warren	5 ft 8 in (1.73 m)	So	Northshore HS; Milwaukee	Slidell, LA
F	42	Nanna Pool	6 ft 1 in (1.85 m)	Sr	Amite County HS	Magnolia, MS

Head coach

- Yolanda Moore (Mississippi)

Assistant coach(es)

- Levar Willis (West Virginia Tech)
- Ayriell Robinson (Saint Louis)
- Aja Gibson (Southeastern Louisiana)

Legend

- (C) Team captain
- (S) Suspended
- (I) Ineligible
- (W) Walk-on
- Injured
- Current redshirt

Roster

== Schedule ==
Date time, TV	Rank^{#}	Opponent^{#}	Result	Record	Site (attendance) city, state
Non-conference regular season
11/13/2015*; 10:30 am		at Arkansas	L 53–97	0–1	Bud Walton Arena (4,937); Fayetteville, AR
11/16/2015*; 7:00 pm		Auburn	L 68–80	0–2	University Center (794); Hammond, LA
11/18/2015*; 6:00 pm		at Georgia Tech	L 49–102	0–3	Hank McCamish Pavilion (485); Atlanta, GA
11/21/2015*; 6:30 pm, FSSW+		at Texas Tech	L 51–113	0–4	United Supermarkets Arena (3,623); Lubbock, TX
11/23/2015*; 6:00 pm, ESPN3		at Wright State	L 72–106	0–5	Nutter Center (459); Dayton, OH
11/25/2015*; 6:00 pm		at Xavier	L 27–67	0–6	Cintas Center (652); Cincinnati, OH
11/29/2015*; 2:00 pm		Louisiana–Monroe	L 84–88	0–7	University Center (488); Hammond, LA
12/02/2015*; 6:00 pm		at Florida A&M	W 62–57	1–7	Teaching Gym (393); Tallahassee, FL
12/17/2015*; 7:00 pm		Jackson State	L 72–79	1–8	University Center (502); Hammond, LA
12/21/2015*; 7:00 pm		Troy	L 90–100	1–9	University Center (415); Hammond, LA
12/28/2015*; 7:00 pm		at No. 8 Mississippi State	L 41–81	1–10	Humphrey Coliseum (3,419); Starkville, MS
Southland Conference regular season
01/04/2016; 4:30 pm		Stephen F. Austin	W 65–56	2–10 (1–0)	University Center (358); Hammond, LA
01/07/2016; 4:30 pm		at Sam Houston State	L 56–80	2–11 (1–1)	Bernard Johnson Coliseum (568); Huntsville, TX
01/09/2016; 4:00 pm		at Houston Baptist	L 56–64	2–12 (1–2)	Sharp Gymnasium (388); Houston, TX
01/14/2016; 7:00 pm		Lamar	W 73–66	3–12 (2–2)	University Center (530); Hammond, LA
01/16/2016; 1:00 pm		Incarnate Word	L 66–70	3–13 (2–3)	University Center (457); Hammond, LA
01/21/2016; 7:00 pm		at Texas A&M–Corpus Christi	L 67–69	3–14 (2–4)	Dugan Wellness Center (457); Corpus Christi, TX
01/27/2016; 7:00 pm		at McNeese State	L 79–96	3–15 (2–5)	Burton Coliseum (483); Lake Charles, LA
01/30/2016; 1:00 pm		at Northwestern State	L 62–82	3–16 (2–6)	Prather Coliseum (1,330); Natchitoches, LA
02/03/2016; 7:00 pm		at Central Arkansas	L 58–80	3–17 (2–7)	Farris Center (722); Conway, AR
02/06/2016; 1:00 pm		Abilene Cristian	L 72–88	3–18 (2–8)	University Center (581); Hammond, LA
02/10/2016; 7:00 pm		McNeese State	L 74–83	3–19 (2–9)	University Center (655); Hammond, LA
02/13/2016; 1:00 pm		Nicholls State	W 78–68	4–19 (3–9)	University Center (527); Hammond, LA
02/18/2016; 7:00 pm		New Orleans	L 51–62	4–20 (3–10)	University Center (593); Hammond, LA
02/21/2016; 3:30 pm, ESPN3		at Abilene Christian	L 70–72	4–21 (3–11)	Moody Coliseum (722); Abilene, TX
02/25/2016; 7:00 pm		Northwestern State	L 58–73	4–22 (3–12)	University Center (1,330); Hammond, LA
02/27/2016; 1:00 pm		Central Arkansas	L 60–64	4–23 (3–13)	University Center (694); Hammond, LA
03/03/2016; 5:30 pm		at New Orleans	L 55–57	4–24 (3–14)	Lakefront Arena; New Orleans, LA
03/05/2016; 1:00 pm		at Nicholls State	L 52–70	4–25 (3–15)	Stopher Gym (953); Thibodaux, LA
*Non-conference game. ^{#}Rankings from AP Poll. (#) Tournament seedings in parentheses. All times are in Central Time.

== See also ==
- 2015–16 Southeastern Louisiana Lions basketball team
