= 2015–16 Stephen F. Austin Ladyjacks basketball team =

Intercollegiate basketball season

2015–16 Stephen F. Austin Ladyjacks basketball
- Conference: Southland Conference
- Record: 18–12 (12–6 Southland)
- Head coach: Mark Kellogg (1st season)
- Assistant coaches: Jayci Stone; Jamila Ganter; Leonard Bishop
- Home arena: William R. Johnson Coliseum

2015–16 Southland Conference women's basketball standings
	Conf.				Overall
Team	W		L	PCT	W		L	PCT
Abilene Christian*	17	–	1	.944	26	–	4	.867
Central Arkansas †	16	–	2	.889	28	–	4	.875
Northwestern State	13	–	5	.722	19	–	12	.613
Stephen F. Austin	12	–	6	.667	18	–	12	.600
McNeese State	11	–	7	.611	20	–	13	.606
Houston Baptist	9	–	9	.500	14	–	15	.483
Nicholls State	8	–	10	.444	10	–	19	.345
Sam Houston State	7	–	11	.389	14	–	18	.438
Lamar	7	–	11	.389	12	–	19	.387
Texas A&M–CC	6	–	12	.333	9	–	20	.310
New Orleans	5	–	13	.278	8	–	19	.296
Incarnate Word*	3	–	15	.167	6	–	23	.207
SE Louisiana	3	–	15	.167	4	–	25	.138
† 2016 Southland tournament winner As of March 18, 2016 *ineligible for postseason play due to Div. I transition Rankings from AP poll

The 2015–16 Stephen F. Austin Ladyjacks basketball team represented Stephen F. Austin University during the 2015–16 NCAA Division I women's basketball season. The Ladyjacks were led by first year head coach Mark Kellogg and played their home games at the William R. Johnson Coliseum. They were members of the Southland Conference. They finished the season 18–12, 12–6 in Southland play to finish in fourth place. They lost in the quarterfinals of the Southland women's tournament to Sam Houston State. Despite having 18 wins, they were not invited to a postseason tournament.

== Roster ==
2015–16 Stephen F. Austin Lumberjacks women's basketball team
Players
Coaches

Pos.	#	Name	Height	Year	Previous school	Hometown
G	1	Taylor Schippers	5 ft 8 in (1.73 m)	RS Sr	Concordia Lutheran; Butler	Houston, TX
G	2	Taylor Ross	5 ft 6 in (1.68 m)	Jr	Pfluegerville HS	Pflugerville, TX
G	3	Chanell Hayes	5 ft 11 in (1.8 m)	Fr	Texas HS	Texarkana, TX
G	4	Kennedy Harris	5 ft 8 in (1.73 m)	Fr	Anderson HS	Austin, TX
G	10	Brentney Branch	5 ft 6 in (1.68 m)	Jr	Clear Creek HS	Houston, TX
G	20	Victoria Pena	5 ft 7 in (1.7 m)	Sr	Edinburg North HS	Edinburg, TX
F	21	Stevi Parker	6 ft 0 in (1.83 m)	RS So	Bixby HS; Tulsa	Bixby, OK
G	23	Paulletta Powell	5 ft 8 in (1.73 m)	Sr	Port Arthur Memorial HS	Port Arthur, TX
G	24	Charisma Alexander	5 ft 9 in (1.75 m)	So	Georgetown HS	Georgetown, TX
F	25	Danielle Rogers	6 ft 2 in (1.88 m)	So	Bishop Lynch HS	DeSoto, TX
F	34	LaNesha Middleton	5 ft 10 in (1.78 m)	RS Jr	Stillwater HS	Stillwater, OK
C	55	Adrienne Lewis	6 ft 1 in (1.85 m)	Jr	DeSoto HS	DeSoto, TX

Head coach

- Mark Kellogg (Austin College)

Assistant coach(es)

- Jayci Stone (Kansas State)
- Jamila Ganter (Texas A&M)
- Leonard Bishop (East Texas A&M)

Legend

- (C) Team captain
- (S) Suspended
- (I) Ineligible
- (W) Walk-on
- Injured
- Current redshirt

Roster

== Schedule ==
Date time, TV	Rank^{#}	Opponent^{#}	Result	Record	Site (attendance) city, state
Non-conference regular season
11/13/2015*; 7:00 pm		Texas–Tyler	W 91–69	1–0	William R. Johnson Coliseum (1,120); Nacogdoches, TX
11/21/2015*; 6:30 pm		at Louisiana Tech	L 44–76	1–1	Thomas Assembly Center (1,812); Ruston, LA
11/24/2015*; 7:00 pm		LSU–Shreveport	W 94–39	2–1	William R. Johnson Coliseum (502); Nacogdoches, TX
11/27/2015*; 3:30 pm		vs. SIU Edwardsville; Plaza Lights Classic	W 82–74	3–1	Swinney Recreation Center (172); Kansas City, MO
11/28/2015*; 1:00 pm		vs. Indiana State; Plaza Lights Classic	W 71–62	4–1	Swinney Recreation Center (164); Kansas City, MO
12/01/2015*; 7:00 pm		Texas–Arlington	L 63–67	4–2	William R. Johnson Coliseum (474); Nacogdoches, TX
12/04/2015*; 5:00 pm		vs. IUPUI; Hospitality Hill Challenge	L 55–62 ^{OT}	4–3	The Super Pit; Denton, TX
12/05/2015*; 12:00 pm		vs. Weber State; Hospitality Hill Challenge	L 46–56	4–4	The Super Pit; Denton, TX
12/09/2015*; 7:00 pm		at TCU	L 55–88	4–5	University Recreation Center (1,501); Fort Worth, TX
12/19/2015*; 9:00 pm, ESPN3		Rice	W 59–45	5–5	William R. Johnson Coliseum (311); Nacogdoches, TX
12/30/2015*; 6:00 pm, ESPN3		Texas A&M–Commerce	W 75–65	6–5	William R. Johnson Coliseum (425); Nacogdoches, TX
Southland Conference regular season
01/02/2016; 4:00 pm, ESPN3		McNeese State	W 80–55	7–5 (1–0)	William R. Johnson Coliseum (1,631); Nacogdoches, TX
01/04/2016; 4:30 pm		at Southeastern Louisiana	L 56–65	7–6 (1–1)	University Center (358); Hammond, LA
01/07/2016; 7:00 pm, ESPN3		Central Arkansas	L 53–55	7–7 (1–2)	William R. Johnson Coliseum (476); Nacogdoches, TX
01/14/2016; 7:00 pm		at New Orleans	L 57–58	7–8 (1–3)	Lakefront Arena (294); New Orleans, LA
01/16/2016; 4:00 pm, ESPN3		Abilene Christian	L 70–85	7–9 (1–4)	William R. Johnson Coliseum (1,749); Nacogdoches, TX
01/21/2016; 7:00 pm, ESPN3		Lamar	L 60–64	7–10 (1–5)	William R. Johnson Coliseum (682); Nacogdoches, TX
01/23/2016; 4:00 pm, ESPN3		Sam Houston State	W 70–63	8–10 (2–5)	William R. Johnson Coliseum (5,274); Nacogdoches, TX
01/30/2016; 11:30 am, ESPN3		at Texas A&M–Corpus Christi	W 71–66	9–10 (3–5)	American Bank Center (704); Corpus Christi, TX
02/04/2016; 7:00 pm, ESPN3		Northwestern State	W 62–58	10–10 (4–5)	William R. Johnson Coliseum (1,330); Nacogdoches, TX
02/06/2016; 4:00 pm		at Houston Baptist	W 64–50	11–10 (5–5)	Sharp Gymnasium (897); Houston, TX
02/11/2016; 7:00 pm, ESPN3		Incarnate Word	W 74–62	12–10 (6–5)	William R. Johnson Coliseum (681); Nacogdoches, TX
02/13/2016; 3:30 pm, ESPN3		Texas A&M–Corpus Christi	W 72–59	13–10 (7–5)	William R. Johnson Coliseum (3,947); Nacogdoches, TX
02/18/2016; 7:00 pm, ESPN3		at Lamar	W 79–77	14–10 (8–5)	Montagne Center (751); Beaumont, TX
02/20/2016; 1:00 pm		at Nicholls State	W 89–67	15–10 (9–5)	Stopher Gym (522); Thibodaux, LA
02/24/2016; 7:00 pm		at Incarnate Word	W 82–66	16–10 (10–5)	McDermott Center (568); San Antonio, TX
02/27/2016; 3:30 pm, ESPN3		Houston Baptist	W 66–54	17–10 (11–5)	William R. Johnson Coliseum (1,330); Nacogdoches, TX
03/03/2016; 5:30 pm		at Northwestern State	L 51–72	17–11 (11–6)	Prather Coliseum (1,913); Natchitoches, LA
03/05/2016; 4:30 pm, ESPN3		at Sam Houston State	W 65–59	18–11 (12–6)	Bernard Johnson Coliseum (945); Huntsville, TX
Southland Women's Tournament
03/11/2016; 1:30 pm		vs. Sam Houston State; Quarterfinals	L 70–78	18–12	Merrell Center; Katy, TX
*Non-conference game. ^{#}Rankings from AP Poll. (#) Tournament seedings in parentheses. All times are in Central Time.

== See also ==
2015–16 Stephen F. Austin Lumberjacks basketball team
