= 2015–16 McNeese State Cowgirls basketball team =

Intercollegiate basketball season

2015–16 McNeese State Cowgirls basketball

WBI, First Round
- Conference: Southland Conference
- Record: 20–13 (11–7 Southland)
- Head coach: Brooks Donald-Williams (9th season)
- Assistant coaches: Kacie Cryer; Kevin Jackson
- Home arena: Burton Coliseum

2015–16 Southland Conference women's basketball standings
	Conf.				Overall
Team	W		L	PCT	W		L	PCT
Abilene Christian*	17	–	1	.944	26	–	4	.867
Central Arkansas †	16	–	2	.889	28	–	4	.875
Northwestern State	13	–	5	.722	19	–	12	.613
Stephen F. Austin	12	–	6	.667	18	–	12	.600
McNeese State	11	–	7	.611	20	–	13	.606
Houston Baptist	9	–	9	.500	14	–	15	.483
Nicholls State	8	–	10	.444	10	–	19	.345
Sam Houston State	7	–	11	.389	14	–	18	.438
Lamar	7	–	11	.389	12	–	19	.387
Texas A&M–CC	6	–	12	.333	9	–	20	.310
New Orleans	5	–	13	.278	8	–	19	.296
Incarnate Word*	3	–	15	.167	6	–	23	.207
SE Louisiana	3	–	15	.167	4	–	25	.138
† 2016 Southland tournament winner As of March 18, 2016 *ineligible for postseason play due to Div. I transition Rankings from AP poll

The 2015–16 McNeese State Cowgirls basketball team represented McNeese State University during the 2015–16 NCAA Division I women's basketball season. The Cowgirls, led by ninth year head coach Brooks Donald-Williams, played all their home games at Burton Coliseum. They were members of the Southland Conference. They finished the season 20–13, 11–7 in Southland play to finish in fifth place. They advanced to the semifinals of the Southland women's tournament where they lost to Central Arkansas. They were invited to the Women's Basketball Invitational where they lost to Stetson in the first round.

On April 7, it was announced that Brooks Donald-Williams has resign from her position from McNeese State and accept her assisting coaching position at Alabama. She finished at McNeese State with a 9 year record of 161–130.

== Roster ==
2015–16 McNeese State Cowgirls women's basketball team
Players
Coaches

Pos.	#	Name	Height	Year	Previous school	Hometown
G	00	Keara Hudnall	6 ft 0 in (1.83 m)	So	Pearland HS	Pearland, TX
G	1	Allison Baggett	5 ft 9 in (1.75 m)	Sr	Iota HS	Iota, LA
F	3	Jayin Johnson	5 ft 5 in (1.65 m)	Sr	Jennings HS	Jennings, LA
G	4	Dede Sheppard	5 ft 8 in (1.73 m)	RS Fr	North Caddo HS	Vivian, LA
F	5	Jasmyn Carswell	6 ft 0 in (1.83 m)	Fr	Airline HS	Bossier City, LA
C	13	Cinthya Rivas	6 ft 2 in (1.88 m)	Fr	North Central Texas Academy	Guadalajara, Mexico
G	15	Gabby Guidry	5 ft 6 in (1.68 m)	So	Lake Arthur HS	Lake Arthur, LA
F	21	Mercedes Rogers	6 ft 0 in (1.83 m)	So	Crowley HS	Crowley, LA
G	22	Hannah Cupit	5 ft 8 in (1.73 m)	Jr	Sulphur HS	Sulphur, LA
G	23	Amber Donnes	5 ft 9 in (1.75 m)	Jr	St. Thomas Aquinas HS	Hammond, LA
G	24	Haily Jenkins	5 ft 9 in (1.75 m)	Jr	Martins Mill HS	Ben Wheeler, TX
F	25	Frederica Haywood	6 ft 1 in (1.85 m)	So	JFK HS	Mound Bayou, MS
G	33	Victoria Rachal	5 ft 7 in (1.7 m)	Jr	Natchitoches Central HS	Natchitoches, LA
G	34	Talisa Boyd	5 ft 3 in (1.6 m)	Fr	Lake Arthur HS	Lake Arthur, LA

Head coach

- Brooks Donald-Williams (Mississippi State)

Assistant coach(es)

- Kacie Cryer (LSU–Shreveport)
- Kevin Jackson (Southeastern Louisiana)

Legend

- (C) Team captain
- (S) Suspended
- (I) Ineligible
- (W) Walk-on
- Injured
- Current redshirt

== Schedule ==
Date time, TV	Rank^{#}	Opponent^{#}	Result	Record	Site (attendance) city, state
Exhibition
11/04/2015*; 7:00 pm		LSU–Shreveport	W 99–55		Burton Coliseum; Lake Charles, LA
Non-conference regular schedule
11/13/2015*; 5:30 pm		at No. 25 Chattanooga; Preseason WNIT First Round	L 53–68	0–1	McKenzie Arena (1,565); Chattanooga, TN
11/20/2015*; 5:00 pm		vs. Dartmouth; Preseason WNIT Consolation Round	W 78–56	1–1	College Park Center (804); Arlington, TX
11/21/2015*; 7:15 pm		at Texas–Arlington; Preseason WNIT Consolation Round	W 63–57	2–1	College Park Center (762); Arlington, TX
11/25/2015*; 12:00 pm		Rice	W 61–53	3–1	Burton Coliseum (381); Lake Charles, LA
11/29/2015*; 2:00 pm		Southern (New Orleans)	W 97–61	4–1	Burton Coliseum (238); Lake Charles, LA
12/01/2015*; 7:00 pm		Louisiana College	W 73–59	5–1	Burton Coliseum (402); Lake Charles, LA
12/06/2015*; 2:00 pm		at Tulane	L 55–74	5–2	Devlin Fieldhouse (962); New Orleans, LA
12/09/2015*; 7:00 pm		Loyola (New Orleans)	W 70–69	6–2	Burton Coliseum (219); Lake Charles, LA
12/13/2015*; 2:00 pm		at No. 4 Baylor	L 46–105	6–3	Ferrell Center (5,625); Waco, TX
12/16/2015*; 5:30 pm		Louisiana–Monroe	W 72–62	7–3	Burton Coliseum (287); Lake Charles, LA
12/19/2015*; 12:00 pm		at Ole Miss	L 56–96	7–4	Tad Smith Coliseum (881); Oxford, MS
12/22/2015*; 6:00 pm		at Louisiana Tech	W 74–71	8–4	Thomas Assembly Center (1,849); Ruston, LA
Southland Conference regular season
01/02/2016; 4:00 pm, ESPN3		at Stephen F. Austin	L 55–80	8–5 (0–1)	William R. Johnson Coliseum (1,631); Nacogdoches, TX
01/04/2016; 7:00 pm		at Houston Baptist	W 71–64	9–5 (1–1)	Sharp Gymnasium (285); Houston, TX
01/09/2016; 1:00 pm		Texas A&M–Corpus Christi	W 72–51	10–5 (2–1)	Burton Coliseum (680); Lake Charles, LA
01/13/2016; 7:00 pm		at Abilene Christian	L 62–79	10–6 (2–2)	Moody Coliseum (1,136); Abilene, TX
01/16/2016; 1:00 pm		Sam Houston State	W 82–79	11–6 (3–2)	Burton Coliseum (453); Lake Charles, LA
01/20/2016; 7:00 pm		Incarnate Word	L 55–68	11–7 (3–3)	Burton Coliseum (357); Lake Charles, LA
01/23/2016; 1:00 pm		Northwestern State	W 78–74 ^{OT}	12–7 (4–3)	Burton Coliseum (1,103); Lake Charles, LA
01/27/2016; 7:00 pm		Southeastern Louisiana	W 96–79	13–7 (5–3)	Burton Coliseum (483); Lake Charles, LA
01/30/2016; 4:00 pm		at New Orleans	W 77–74 ^{OT}	14–7 (6–3)	Lakefront Arena; New Orleans, LA
02/02/2016; 7:00 pm		New Orleans	W 92–63	15–7 (7–3)	Lake Charles Civic Center (487); Lake Charles, LA
02/06/2016; 1:00 pm		at Nicholls State	L 81–85	15–8 (7–4)	Stopher Gym (478); Thibodaux, LA
02/10/2016; 7:00 pm		at Southeastern Louisiana	W 83–74	16–8 (8–4)	University Center (655); Hammond, LA
02/13/2016; 7:00 pm, ESPN3		at Northwestern State	L 64–85	16–9 (8–5)	Prather Coliseum (1,314); Natchitoches, LA
02/17/2016; 6:00 pm		Central Arkansas	L 56–70	16–10 (8–6)	Burton Coliseum (614); Lake Charles, LA
02/20/2016; 1:00 pm		Lamar; Battle of the Border	W 92–84	17–10 (9–6)	Burton Coliseum (1,403); Lake Charles, LA
02/24/2016; 7:00 pm, ESPN3		at Lamar; Battle of the Border	W 76–69	18–10 (10–6)	Montagne Center (737); Beaumont, TX
02/27/2016; 1:00 pm		Nicholls State	W 96–62	19–10 (11–6)	Burton Coliseum (1,404); Lake Charles, LA
03/05/2016; 2:00 pm		at Central Arkansas	L 52–76	19–11 (12–6)	Farris Center (976); Conway, AR
Southland Women's Tournament
03/11/2016; 11:00 am, ESPN3		vs. Lamar; Quarterfinals	W 88–78	20–11	Merrell Center; Katy, TX
03/12/2016; 1:00 pm, ESPN3		vs. Central Arkansas; Semifinals	L 64–72	20–12	Merrell Center; Katy, TX
WBI
03/17/2016*; 6:00 pm		at Stetson; First Round	L 54–89	20–13	Edmunds Center (209); DeLand, FL
*Non-conference game. ^{#}Rankings from AP Poll. (#) Tournament seedings in parentheses. All times are in Central Time.

== See also ==
2015–16 McNeese State Cowboys basketball team
