= 2015–16 New Orleans Privateers women's basketball team =

Intercollegiate basketball season

2015–16 New Orleans Privateers women's basketball
- Conference: Southland Conference
- Record: 8–19 (5–13 Southland)
- Head coach: Keeshawn Davenport (5th season)
- Assistant coaches: Alpha English; Jordan Hines; Wyketha Harrell
- Home arena: Lakefront Arena (Capacity: 10,000)

2015–16 Southland Conference women's basketball standings
	Conf.				Overall
Team	W		L	PCT	W		L	PCT
Abilene Christian*	17	–	1	.944	26	–	4	.867
Central Arkansas †	16	–	2	.889	28	–	4	.875
Northwestern State	13	–	5	.722	19	–	12	.613
Stephen F. Austin	12	–	6	.667	18	–	12	.600
McNeese State	11	–	7	.611	20	–	13	.606
Houston Baptist	9	–	9	.500	14	–	15	.483
Nicholls State	8	–	10	.444	10	–	19	.345
Sam Houston State	7	–	11	.389	14	–	18	.438
Lamar	7	–	11	.389	12	–	19	.387
Texas A&M–CC	6	–	12	.333	9	–	20	.310
New Orleans	5	–	13	.278	8	–	19	.296
Incarnate Word*	3	–	15	.167	6	–	23	.207
SE Louisiana	3	–	15	.167	4	–	25	.138
† 2016 Southland tournament winner As of March 18, 2016 *ineligible for postseason play due to Div. I transition Rankings from AP poll

The 2015–16 New Orleans Privateers women's basketball team represented the University of New Orleans during the 2015–16 NCAA Division I women's basketball season. The Privateers, led by fifth-year head coach Keeshawn Davenport, played their home games at Lakefront Arena in New Orleans, Louisiana. They were members of the Southland Conference and finished the season 8–19, 5–13 in Southland play, to finish in eleventh place. They failed to qualify for the Southland women's tournament.

== Roster ==
2015–16 New Orleans Privateers women's basketball team
Players
Coaches

Pos.	#	Name	Height	Year	Previous school	Hometown
F	00	Haile Matthews	6 ft 0 in (1.83 m)	So	West Jefferson HS	Harvey, LA
G	3	Jewel Angelo	5 ft 11 in (1.8 m)	Jr	Manvel HS	Manvel, TX
G	4	Ariele Davis	5 ft 8 in (1.73 m)	Jr	Pineville HS	Alexandria, LA
G	5	Alexis Martin	5 ft 7 in (1.7 m)	Jr	Loyola Prep HS	Shreveport, LA
G	10	Danielle Wright	5 ft 7 in (1.7 m)	Fr	Morrilton HS	Morrilton, AR
F	14	Raven Coleman	6 ft 0 in (1.83 m)	Jr	John Ehret HS	Marrero, LA
G	20	Dasia Batiste	5 ft 7 in (1.7 m)	Jr	Episcopal HS	Houston, TX
G	21	Randi Brown	5 ft 7 in (1.7 m)	So	Central Catholic HS	Houma, LA
F/C	22	Mathilde Fogelstrom	6 ft 2 in (1.88 m)	Sr	Kent HS; Ørestad Gymnasium	Copenhagen, Denmark
G	23	Mariah Wright	5 ft 3 in (1.6 m)	RS Fr	Zachary HS	Zachary, LA
G	25	Kayla Mundy	5 ft 8 in (1.73 m)	So	Liberty HS	McKinney, TX
C	30	Shania Woods	6 ft 1 in (1.85 m)	Fr	Lutheran HS	Cypress, TX
G	32	Danielle Davis	5 ft 8 in (1.73 m)	RS Sr	Oakton HS; Central Connecticut	Oakton, VA
F	34	Bria Platenburg	5 ft 10 in (1.78 m)	RS Jr	Wakeland HS; Texas Woman's University	Frisco, TX
F	35	Yasmin Taylor	5 ft 10 in (1.78 m)	Sr	Grace King HS	Metarie, LA

Head coach

- Keeshawn Davenport (New Orleans)

Assistant coach(es)

- Alpha English (San José State)
- Jordan Hines (McNeese State)
- Wyketha Harrell (UMKC)

Legend

- (C) Team captain
- (S) Suspended
- (I) Ineligible
- (W) Walk-on
- Injured
- Current redshirt

Roster
Last update: April 5, 2025

== Schedule ==
Date time, TV	Rank^{#}	Opponent^{#}	Result	Record	Site (attendance) city, state
Non-conference schedule
November 15, 2015*; 2:00 p.m.		at TCU	L 36–85	0–1	University Recreation Center (1,657); Fort Worth, TX
November 19, 2015*; 5:30 p.m.		LSU–Alexandria	W 93–75	1–1	Lakefront Arena (580); New Orleans, LA
November 22, 2015*; 2:00 p.m.		at Iowa State			Hilton Coliseum; Ames, IA
November 28, 2015*; 1:00 p.m.		vs. Florida A&M; KSU Thanksgiving Classic	L 60–71	1–2	KSU Convocation Center (174); Kennesaw, GA
November 29, 2015*; 3:30 p.m., ESPN3		at Kennesaw State; KSU Thanksgiving Classic	L 53–60	1–3	KSU Convocation Center (457); Kennesaw, GA
December 5, 2015*; 2:00 p.m.		Trinity Baptist	W 109–46	2–3	Lakefront Arena (312); New Orleans, LA
December 12, 2015*; 4:00 p.m.		Jackson State	W 85–68	3–3	Lakefront Arena (487); New Orleans, LA
December 14, 2015*; 6:00 p.m.		at Ole Miss	L 59–97	3–4	Tad Smith Coliseum (697); Oxford, MS
December 17, 2015*; 11:00 a.m.		UNC Greensboro	L 79–81	3–5	Lakefront Arena (304); New Orleans, LA
December 30, 2015*; 7:00 p.m.		at Arkansas	L 41–73	3–6	Bud Walton Arena (1,930); Fayetteville, AR
Southland Conference schedule
January 4, 2016; 5:00 p.m.		at Lamar	L 52–79	3–7 (0–1)	Montagne Center (718); Beaumont, TX
January 7, 2016; 7:00 p.m.		Incarnate Word	W 55–49	4–7 (1–1)	Lakefront Arena (261); New Orleans, LA
January 9, 2016; 2:00 p.m.		at Sam Houston State	L 52–64	4–8 (1–2)	Bernard Johnson Coliseum (345); Huntsville, TX
January 14, 2016; 7:00 p.m.		Stephen F. Austin	W 58–57	5–8 (2–2)	Lakefront Arena (294); New Orleans, LA
January 16, 2016; 4:00 p.m., ESPN3		Houston Baptist	L 51–71	5–9 (2–3)	Lakefront Arena (1,066); New Orleans, LA
January 21, 2016; 7:00 p.m.		Central Arkansas	L 44–59	5–10 (2–4)	Lakefront Arena (302); New Orleans, LA
January 23, 2016; 4:30 p.m.		at Texas A&M–Corpus Christi	L 59–73	5–11 (2–5)	American Bank Center (403); Corpus Christi, TX
January 27, 2016; 7:00 p.m.		Nicholls State	W 62–55	6–11 (3–5)	Lakefront Arena (341); New Orleans, LA
January 30, 2016; 4:00 p.m.		McNeese State	L 74–77 ^{OT}	6–12 (3–6)	Lakefront Arena; New Orleans, LA
February 2, 2016; 7:00 p.m.		at McNeese State	L 63–92	6–13 (3–7)	Lake Charles Civic Center (487); Lake Charles, LA
February 6, 2016; 2:00 p.m.		at Central Arkansas	L 55–67	6–14 (3–8)	Farris Center (1,585); Conway, AR
February 11, 2016; 7:00 p.m.		Texas A&M–Corpus Christi	L 64–75	6–15 (3–9)	Lakefront Arena (251); New Orleans, LA
February 18, 2016; 7:00 p.m.		at Southeastern Louisiana	W 62–51	7–15 (4–9)	University Center (593); Hammond, LA
February 20, 2016; 1:00 p.m.		at Northwestern State	L 53–70	7–16 (4–10)	Prather Coliseum (913); Natchitoches, LA
February 24, 2016; 6:00 p.m.		at Nicholls State	L 55–70	7–17 (4–11)	Stopher Gym (991); Thibodaux, LA
February 27, 2016; 2:00 p.m.		at Abilene Christian	L 70–80	7–18 (4–12)	Moody Coliseum (1,015); Abilene, TX
March 3, 2016; 5:30 p.m.		Southeastern Louisiana	W 57–55	8–18 (5–12)	Lakefront Arena; New Orleans, LA
March 5, 2016; 4:00 p.m.		Northwestern State	L 46–58	8–19 (5–13)	Lakefront Arena (866); New Orleans, LA
*Non-conference game. ^{#}Rankings from AP poll. (#) Tournament seedings in parentheses. All times are in Central.

== See also ==
- 2015–16 New Orleans Privateers men's basketball team
