= Children's Museum of Manhattan =

Museum in New York City

Coordinates: 40°47′9.1″N 73°58′38″W

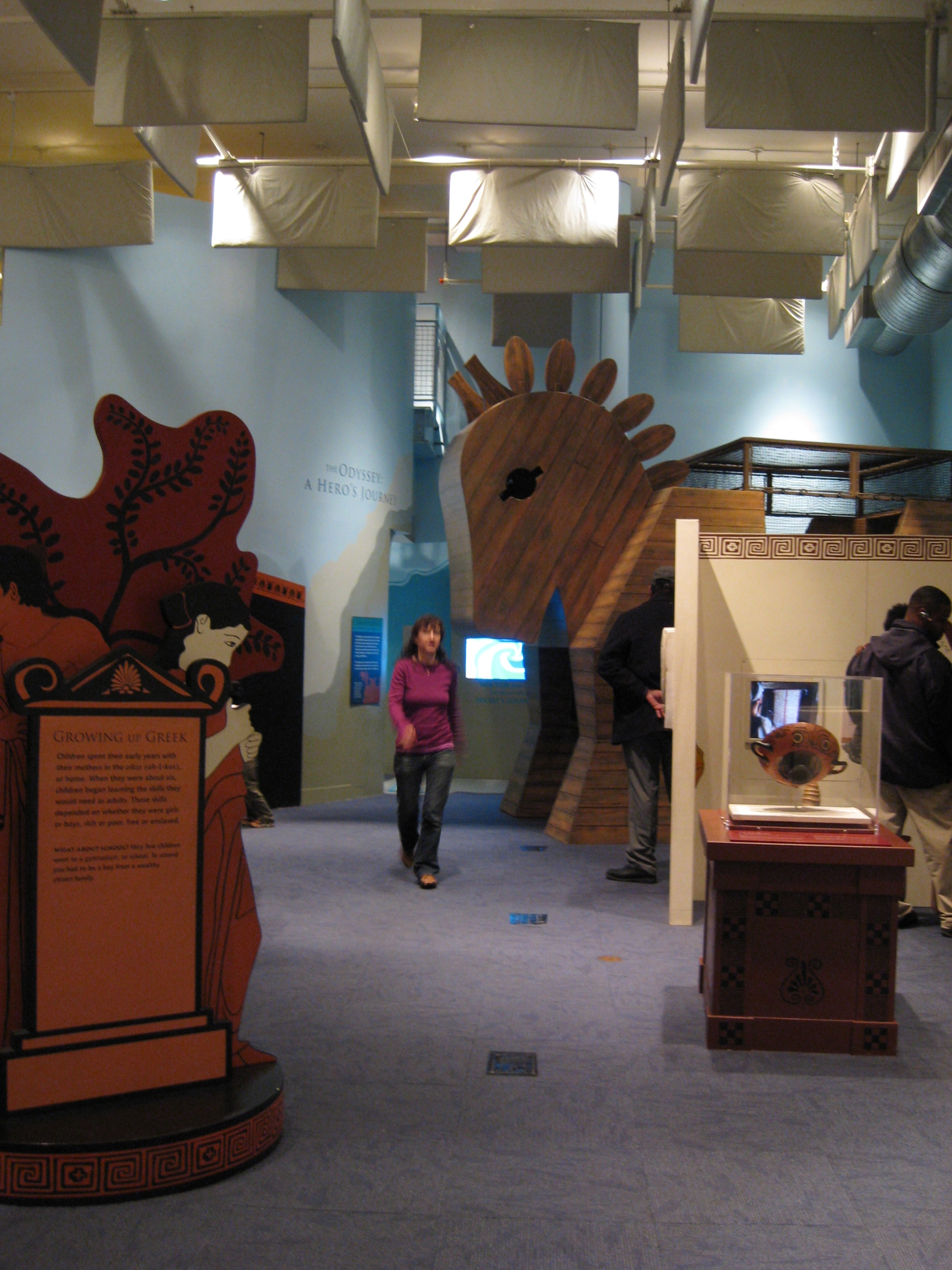
- Former names: Manhattan Laboratory Museum (1979–1985)
- Established: October 16, 1979
- Location: 212 West 83rd Street; Manhattan, New York, United States
- Director: Dava Schub
- Public transit access: Subway: at 86th Street; Bus: M7, M11, M86, M104
- Website: cmom.org

The Children’s Museum of Manhattan is located on West 83rd street on the Upper West Side of Manhattan in New York City. It was founded by Bette Korman, under the name GAME (Growth Through Art and Museum Experience), in 1973. The museum adopted its current name on May 2, 1985, and moved to its current location on West 83rd Street in 1989. In 2018, the museum announced a plan to relocate to a larger space on 96th Street and Central Park West.

== History ==
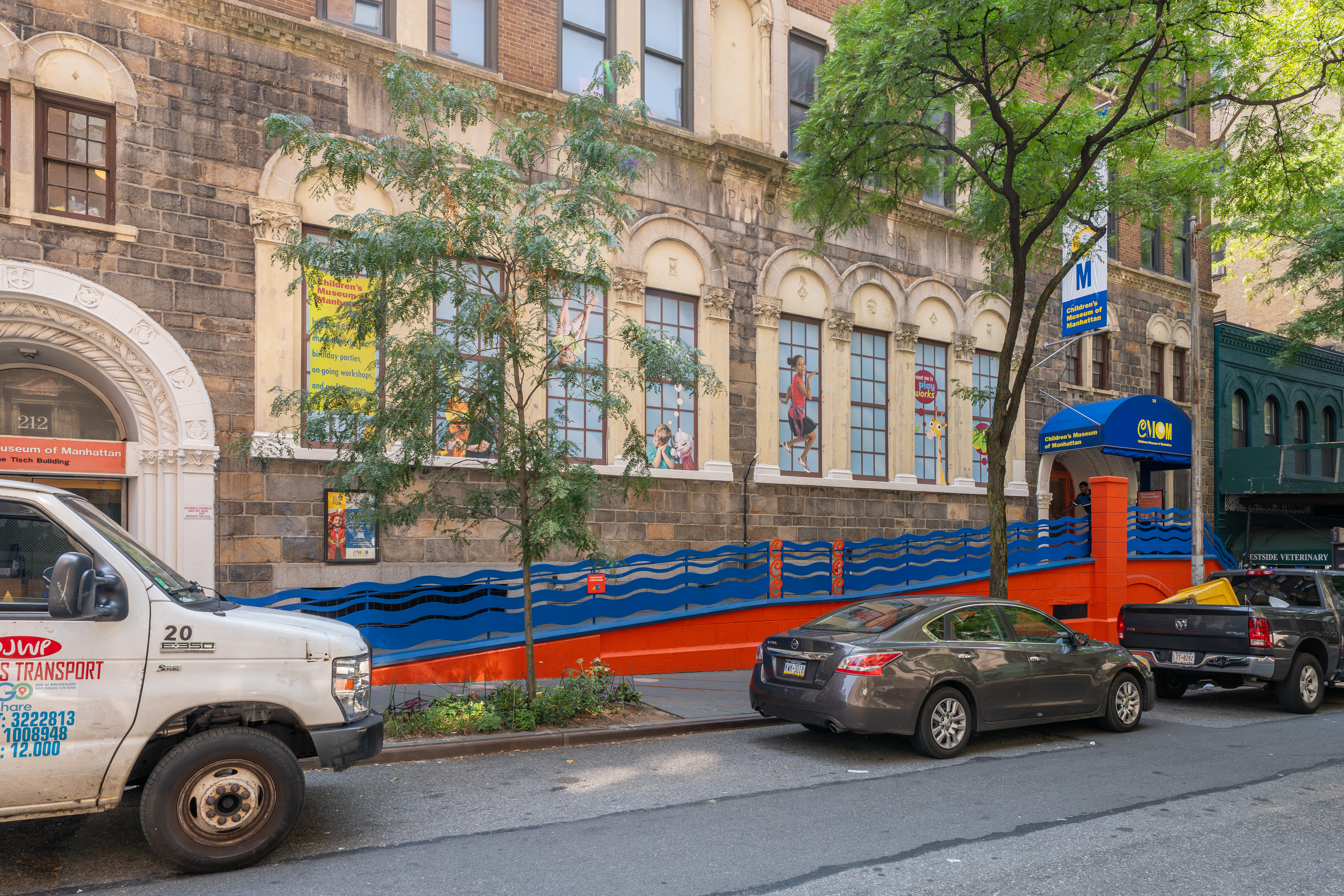
Entrance

The museum was founded as GAME in 1973, with New York City being in a deep fiscal crisis, and school art, music, and cultural programs eliminated, a loosely organized, group of artists and educators set up a basement storefront to serve Harlem and the Upper West Side. With a challenge grant from the National Endowment for the Arts, a city-owned courthouse at 314 West 54th Street was renovated into a small exhibition, studio, and workshop and renamed the Manhattan Laboratory Museum.

The museum expanded exhibit and programming space adding a media center, an outdoor environmental center and an early childhood center. CMOM's visibility and audience grew with the World of Pooh exhibit, created through a partnership with Disney. Wordplay, CMOM's first exhibit designed specifically for children four and younger, opened in 1998. CMOM's executive director, Andy Ackerman, served as president of the Association of Children's Museums and hosted the 1999 ACM annual conference. In 2000, CMOM completed construction to add a new entrance, lobby, and supplement exhibit space.

In 2005, it was among 406 New York City arts and social service institutions to receive part of a $20 million grant from the Carnegie Corporation of New York, which was made possible through a donation by New York City mayor Michael Bloomberg.

In 2019, the museum's director Andrew Ackerman retired after nearly thirty years and was replaced by Aileen Hefferren.

As of 2021, it reaches approximately 350,000 visitors a year at the museum, an increase of 25,000 over the prior decade. It was also one of the founding organizations of the New York City Museum School, part of its outreach efforts since its founding as a community organization.

=== Central Park West building ===
In January 2018, the Children's Museum of Manhattan announced that it had acquired the former First Church of Christ, Scientist building at 96th Street and Central Park West, and planned to move to the new facility after making renovations. The church building cost $45 million, and the city provided $5.5 million for a renovation of the church. FXCollaborative was hired to renovate the church. The original plan for the church was controversial, as residents opposed the addition of a penthouse on the roof and the removal of windows, but FXCollaborative's proposal was ultimately approved in June 2020. The museum publicly presented renderings of the renovated church building in 2020, in which it planned 41,300 square feet (3,840 m^{2}) for galleries and exhibitions.

In conjunction with the relocation, the Children's Museum of Manhattan began raising $300 million as part of a fundraiser. By 2024, the museum had raised $200 million and plans to relocate in 2028.
