= 2016 Southland Conference women's basketball tournament =

- Classification: Division I
- Season: 2015–16
- Teams: 8
- Site: Merrell Center; Katy, Texas
- Champions: Central Arkansas (1st title)
- Winning coach: Sandra Rushing (1st title)
- MVP: Angela Beadle (Sam Houston State)
- Television: SLC Digital/ESPN3/CBSSN

2015–16 Southland Conference women's basketball standings
	Conf.				Overall
Team	W		L	PCT	W		L	PCT
Abilene Christian*	17	–	1	.944	26	–	4	.867
Central Arkansas †	16	–	2	.889	28	–	4	.875
Northwestern State	13	–	5	.722	19	–	12	.613
Stephen F. Austin	12	–	6	.667	18	–	12	.600
McNeese State	11	–	7	.611	20	–	13	.606
Houston Baptist	9	–	9	.500	14	–	15	.483
Nicholls State	8	–	10	.444	10	–	19	.345
Sam Houston State	7	–	11	.389	14	–	18	.438
Lamar	7	–	11	.389	12	–	19	.387
Texas A&M–CC	6	–	12	.333	9	–	20	.310
New Orleans	5	–	13	.278	8	–	19	.296
Incarnate Word*	3	–	15	.167	6	–	23	.207
SE Louisiana	3	–	15	.167	4	–	25	.138
† 2016 Southland tournament winner As of March 18, 2016 *ineligible for postseason play due to Div. I transition Rankings from AP poll

The 2016 Southland Conference women's basketball tournament, a part of the 2015–16 NCAA Division I women's basketball season, took place March 10–13, 2016 at the Merrell Center in Katy, Texas. The winner of the tournament received the Southland Conference's automatic bid to the 2016 NCAA tournament.

== Seeds and regular season standings ==
Only the Top 8 teams advanced to the Southland Conference tournament. If a team ineligible for the NCAA Tourney finished in the top 8, their seed fell to the next eligible team. Abilene Christian and Incarnate Word were ineligible for post-season play as they were in the third year of a 4-year transition from D2 to D1. They wouldn't be eligible for the Southland tourney until 2018. This chart shows all the teams records and standings and explains why teams advanced to the conference tourney or finished in certain tiebreaking positions.

2015 Southland Conference women's basketball tournament seeds
Seed	School	Conference record	Overall record (end of regular season)	Tiebreaker
1.	Abilene Christian ‡*	17–1	26–3	D1 transitioning, ineligible for NCAA Tourney
2.	Central Arkansas *	16–2	26–3	
3.	Northwestern State #	13–5	19–10	
4.	Stephen F. Austin #	12–6	18–12	
5.	McNeese State	11–7	19–11	
6.	Houston Baptist	9–9	14–14	
7.	Nicholls State	8–10	10–18	
8.	Sam Houston State	7–11	16–12	2–0 vs. Lamar
9.	Lamar	7–11	11–18	0–2 vs. Sam Houston State
10.	Texas A&M–Corpus Christi	6–12	9–20	
11.	New Orleans	5–13	8–19	
12.	Incarnate Word	3–15	6–23	1–0 vs. Southeast Louisiana, D1 transitioning, ineligible for NCAA Tourney
13.	Southeast Louisiana	3–15	4–25	0–1 vs. Incarnate Word
‡ – Southland Conference regular season champions. * – received a first-round and second-round bye in the conference tournament. # – received a first-round bye in the conference tournament. Overall record are as of the end of the regular season.

== Schedule ==
Session	Game	Time*	Matchup^{#}	Television
First round – Thursday, March 10
1	1	11:00 am	#5 Houston Baptist vs. #8 Lamar	SLC Digital
1	2	1:30 pm	#6 Nicholls State vs. #7 Sam Houston State	SLC Digital
Quarterfinals – Friday, March 11
2	3	11:00 am	#4 McNeese State vs. #8 Lamar	SLC Digital
2	4	1:30 pm	#3 Stephen F. Austin vs. #7 Sam Houston State	SLC Digital
Semifinals – Saturday, March 12
3	5	1:00 pm	#1 Central Arkansas vs. #4 McNeese State	ESPN3
3	6	3:30 pm	#2 Northwestern State vs. #7 Sam Houston State	ESPN3
Championship – Sunday, March 13
4	7	11:30 am	#1 Central Arkansas vs #7 Sam Houston State	CBSSN
*Game times in CST. #-Rankings denote tournament seeding.

== Bracket ==
First round Thursday, March 10; SLC Digital
5	Houston Baptist	95
8	Lamar	98^{2OT}
7	Sam Houston State	73
6	Nicholls State	64

Quarterfinals; Friday, March 12; SLC Digital
4	McNeese State	88
8	Lamar	78
3	Stephen F. Austin	70
7	Sam Houston State	78

Semifinals; Saturday, March 13; ESPN3
1	Central Arkansas	72
4	McNeese State	64
2	Northwestern State	71
7	Sam Houston State	78

Championship Game; Sunday, March 14; CBSSN
1	Central Arkansas	69
7	Sam Houston State	62

== See also ==
- 2016 Southland Conference men's basketball tournament
- Southland Conference women's basketball tournament
