= 2015–16 Incarnate Word Cardinals women's basketball team =

Intercollegiate basketball season

2015–16 Incarnate Word Cardinals women's basketball
- Conference: Southland Conference
- Record: 6–23 (3–15 Southland)
- Head coach: Kate Henderson (2nd season)
- Assistant coaches: Eric Dumas; Bryant Porter; Natalie Marlowe
- Home arena: McDermott Center

2015–16 Southland Conference women's basketball standings
	Conf.				Overall
Team	W		L	PCT	W		L	PCT
Abilene Christian*	17	–	1	.944	26	–	4	.867
Central Arkansas †	16	–	2	.889	28	–	4	.875
Northwestern State	13	–	5	.722	19	–	12	.613
Stephen F. Austin	12	–	6	.667	18	–	12	.600
McNeese State	11	–	7	.611	20	–	13	.606
Houston Baptist	9	–	9	.500	14	–	15	.483
Nicholls State	8	–	10	.444	10	–	19	.345
Sam Houston State	7	–	11	.389	14	–	18	.438
Lamar	7	–	11	.389	12	–	19	.387
Texas A&M–CC	6	–	12	.333	9	–	20	.310
New Orleans	5	–	13	.278	8	–	19	.296
Incarnate Word*	3	–	15	.167	6	–	23	.207
SE Louisiana	3	–	15	.167	4	–	25	.138
† 2016 Southland tournament winner As of March 18, 2016 *ineligible for postseason play due to Div. I transition Rankings from AP poll

The 2015–16 Incarnate Word Cardinals women's basketball team represented the University of the Incarnate Word during the 2015–16 NCAA Division I women's basketball season. The Cardinals, led by second year head coach Kate Henderson, played their home games at McDermott Center. They were members of the Southland Conference. They finished the season 6–23, 3–15 in Southland play to finish in a tie for 12th place.

The 2015–16 season was year 3 of a 4-year transitional period for Incarnate Word from D2 to D1. In years 2–4 Incarnate Word is classified as a D1 school for scheduling purposes. They played a full conference schedule, and they could win the regular season conference title. However Incarnate Word could not participate in the conference tourney until the 2017–18 season, at which time they will also be able to enter the NCAA tournament, should they win the conference. Incarnate Word was eligible to participate in the WBI or WNIT had they been invited.

On March 7, Kate Henderson has resigned her position. She finished at Incarnate Word with a 2-year record of 19–66.

== Audio streaming ==
All Incarnate Word games were to be broadcast on KUIW Radio, and they provided streaming of all non-televised home games shown via UIW TV.

== Roster ==
2015–16 Incarnate Word Cardinals women's basketball team
Players
Coaches

Pos.	#	Name	Height	Year	Previous school	Hometown
G	4	Tanjunique Ajeto	5 ft 8 in (1.73 m)	Jr	Foothill; Eastern Oklahoma	Federal Way, WA
G	4	Brianna Williams	5 ft 6 in (1.68 m)	Jr	Mesquite; Collin County CC	Wylie, TX
G	10	Haley Frias	5 ft 8 in (1.73 m)	So	Georgetown	Georgetown, TX
G	12	Melina Merritt	5 ft 8 in (1.73 m)	So	Cedar Ridge	Round Rock, TX
G	20	Aricka Adams	5 ft 5 in (1.65 m)	Sr	Round Rock; Temple	Round Rock, TX
G	22	Jordan Franks	5 ft 9 in (1.75 m)	Sr	Norman; Eastern Oklahoma	Norman, OK
F	23	Celia Garcia Paunero	5 ft 10 in (1.78 m)	Jr	Julian Marias; Otero JC	Valladolid, Spain
F	24	Quincy Baker	6 ft 2 in (1.88 m)	So	Klein	Houston, TX
F	25	Yvonne Maosa	5 ft 10 in (1.78 m)	Sr	Mansfield; Jacksonville College	Mansfield, TX
G	31	Aneya Torres	5 ft 5 in (1.65 m)	So	Del Rio	Del Rio, TX
F	32	Breanna Bimingham	6 ft 0 in (1.83 m)	Sr	Harper Creek; Kalamazoo Valley CC	Battle Creek, MI
C	33	Shanise Brooks	6 ft 1 in (1.85 m)	Sr	Highland Park; Seward CC	Topeka, KS
G	41	Cheyenne Berry	5 ft 9 in (1.75 m)	RS Sr	Lytle; Tarleton State	Lytle, TX

Head coach

- Kate Henderson (Incarnate Word)

Assistant coach(es)

- Eric Dumas (Lambuth)
- Bryant Porter (Missouri Valley)
- Natalie Marlowe (Chicago State)

Legend

- (C) Team captain
- (S) Suspended
- (I) Ineligible
- (W) Walk-on
- Injured
- Current redshirt

Roster

== Schedule ==
Date time, TV	Rank^{#}	Opponent^{#}	Result	Record	Site (attendance) city, state
Non-conference regular season
11/13/2015*; 6:00 pm		LSU–Alexandria	W 96–54	1–0	McDermott Center (836); San Antonio, TX
11/17/2015*; 8:00 pm		at Colorado State	L 37–60	1–1	Moby Arena (688); Fort Collins, CO
11/19/2015*; 6:00 pm		Sul Ross State	W 54–35	2–1	McDermott Center (335); San Antonio, TX
11/23/2015*; 6:00 pm		Howard Payne	W 78–65	3–1	McDermott Center (222); San Antonio, TX
12/03/2015*; 6:00 pm		Texas–Rio Grande Valley	L 50–68	3–2	McDermott Center (206); San Antonio, TX
12/05/2015*; 4:00 pm		at Trinity	L 55–61	3–3	William H. Bell Athletic Center (154); San Antonio, TX
12/07/2015*; 6:00 pm		Houston	L 51–67	3–4	McDermott Center (502); San Antonio, TX
12/10/2015*; 6:00 pm		at Purdue	L 27–95	3–5	Mackey Arena (5,480); West Lafayette, IN
12/14/2015*; 6:30 pm		at Texas Tech	L 55–70	3–6	United Supermarkets Arena (3,096); Lubbock, TX
12/17/2015*; 7:00 pm, TWCS Alt.		at Texas–Rio Grande Valley	L 47–60	3–7	UTRGV Fieldhouse (206); Edinburg, TX
12/21/2015*; 2:00 pm		North Texas	L 55–62	3–8	McDermott Center (255); San Antonio, TX
Southland Conference regular season
01/02/2016; 2:00 pm		Sam Houston State	L 60–65	3–9 (0–1)	McDermott Center (335); San Antonio, TX
01/07/2016; 7:00 pm		at New Orleans	L 49–55	3–10 (0–2)	Lakefront Arena (261); New Orleans, LA
01/09/2016; 2:00 pm		Northwestern State	L 48–53	3–11 (0–3)	McDermott Center (284); San Antonio, TX
01/16/2016; 1:00 pm		at Southeastern Louisiana	W 70–66	4–11 (1–3)	University Center (457); Hammond, LA
01/20/2016; 7:00 pm		at McNeese State	W 68–55	5–11 (2–3)	Burton Coliseum (357); Lake Charles, LA
01/23/2016; 2:00 pm		Abilene Christian	L 71–86	5–12 (2–4)	McDermott Center (357); San Antonio, TX
01/27/2016; 6:00 pm		Texas A&M–Corpus Christi	L 56–57	5–13 (2–5)	McDermott Center (435); San Antonio, TX
01/30/2016; 2:00 pm		Nicholls State	L 64–66	5–14 (2–6)	McDermott Center (187); San Antonio, TX
02/03/2016; 6:00 pm		at Nicholls State	W 63–61	6–14 (3–6)	Stopher Gym (513); Thibodaux, LA
02/06/2016; 2:00 pm, ESPN3		at Lamar	L 49–59	6–15 (3–7)	Montagne Center (888); Beaumont, TX
02/11/2016; 7:00 pm, ESPN3		at Stephen F. Austin	L 62–74	6–16 (3–8)	William R. Johnson Coliseum (681); Nacogdoches, TX
02/13/2016; 2:00 pm		Stephen F. Austin	L 57–76	6–17 (3–9)	McDermott Center (275); San Antonio, TX
02/18/2016; 6:00 pm		Houston Baptist	L 61–62	6–18 (3–10)	McDermott Center (450); San Antonio, TX
02/20/2016; 4:00 pm		at Texas A&M–Corpus Christi	L 55–59	6–19 (3–11)	Dugan Wellness Center (520); Corpus Christai, TX
02/24/2016; 6:00 pm		Stephen F. Austin	L 66–82	6–20 (3–12)	McDermott Center (568); San Antonio, TX
02/27/2016; 2:00 pm		Lanar	L 61–67	6–21 (3–13)	McDermott Center (676); San Antonio, TX
03/02/2016; 7:00 pm		at Abilene Christian	L 58–66	6–22 (3–14)	Moody Coliseum (1,231); Abilene, TX
03/05/2016; 12:00 pm		at Houston Baptist	L 46–64	6–23 (3–15)	Sharp Gymnasium (508); Houston, TX
*Non-conference game. ^{#}Rankings from AP Poll. (#) Tournament seedings in parentheses. All times are in Central Time.

== See also ==
2015–16 Incarnate Word Cardinals men's basketball team
