= 2015–16 Sam Houston State Bearkats women's basketball team =

Intercollegiate basketball season

2015–16 Sam Houston State Bearkats women's basketball
- Conference: Southland Conference
- Record: 14–18 (7–11 Southland)
- Head coach: Brenda Welch-Nichols (10th season)
- Assistant coaches: Rosalind Jennings; Jessica Salera; Stacy Stephens
- Home arena: Bernard Johnson Coliseum

2015–16 Southland Conference women's basketball standings
	Conf.				Overall
Team	W		L	PCT	W		L	PCT
Abilene Christian*	17	–	1	.944	26	–	4	.867
Central Arkansas †	16	–	2	.889	28	–	4	.875
Northwestern State	13	–	5	.722	19	–	12	.613
Stephen F. Austin	12	–	6	.667	18	–	12	.600
McNeese State	11	–	7	.611	20	–	13	.606
Houston Baptist	9	–	9	.500	14	–	15	.483
Nicholls State	8	–	10	.444	10	–	19	.345
Sam Houston State	7	–	11	.389	14	–	18	.438
Lamar	7	–	11	.389	12	–	19	.387
Texas A&M–CC	6	–	12	.333	9	–	20	.310
New Orleans	5	–	13	.278	8	–	19	.296
Incarnate Word*	3	–	15	.167	6	–	23	.207
SE Louisiana	3	–	15	.167	4	–	25	.138
† 2016 Southland tournament winner As of March 18, 2016 *ineligible for postseason play due to Div. I transition Rankings from AP poll

The 2015–16 Sam Houston State Bearkats women's basketball team represented Sam Houston State University during the 2015–16 NCAA Division I women's basketball season. The Bearkats, led by tenth year head coach Brenda Welch-Nichols, played their home games at the Bernard Johnson Coliseum and were members of the Southland Conference. They finished the season 14–18, 7–11 in Southland play to finish in a tie for eighth place. They advanced to the championship game of the Southland women's tournament where they lost to Central Arkansas.

== Roster ==
2015–16 Sam Houston State Bearkats women's basketball team
Players
Coaches

Pos.	#	Name	Height	Year	Previous school	Hometown
G	2	Kamry Orr	5 ft 8 in (1.73 m)	Fr	Central	Little Rock, AR
G	3	Shernise Robertson	5 ft 6 in (1.68 m)	Sr	Cy Falls HS; Tyler JC	Cypress, TX
G	4	Jasmin Anderson	5 ft 7 in (1.7 m)	Sr	Loyola Prep	Shreveport, LA
G	5	Morghen Day	5 ft 6 in (1.68 m)	Jr	Rockwall HS	Rockwall, TX
G	10	Angela Delaney	5 ft 8 in (1.73 m)	So	Harker Heights	Killeen, TX
F	12	Angela Beadle	6 ft 3 in (1.91 m)	RS Sr	Crockett	Austin, TX
F	21	Lydia Baxter	5 ft 10 in (1.78 m)	Fr	Bowie	Austin, TX
C	22	Jasmine McCants	6 ft 0 in (1.83 m)	Jr	Pine Forest; Alabama Southern CC	Pensacola, FL
G	23	Amanda Barnes	5 ft 5 in (1.65 m)	Sr	Martin HS	Arlington, TX
G	25	Laurynn McGowen	5 ft 8 in (1.73 m)	Fr	Juan Seguin	Arlington, TX
C	35	Ashleigh Cooper	6 ft 1 in (1.85 m)	Fr	Henderickson	Pflugerville, TX

Head coach

- Brenda Welch-Nichols (Sam Houston State)

Assistant coach(es)

- Rosalind Jennings (North Greenville)
- Jessica Salera (Tennessee Temple)
- Stacy Stephens (Texas)

Legend

- (C) Team captain
- (S) Suspended
- (I) Ineligible
- (W) Walk-on
- Injured
- Current redshirt

Roster

== Schedule ==
Date time, TV	Rank^{#}	Opponent^{#}	Result	Record	Site (attendance) city, state
Exhibition
11/07/2015*; 3:00 pm		Mary Hardin–Baylor	W 75–59		Bernard Johnson Coliseum; Huntsville, TX
Non-conference regular season
11/13/2015*; 6:00 pm		at TCU	L 59–85	0–1	University Recreation Center (1,663); Fort Worth, TX
11/15/2015*; 2:00 pm		at Arkansas	L 47–67	0–2	Bud Walton Arena (1,612); Fayetteville, AR
11/20/2015*; 11:00 am		Our Lady of the Lake	W 67–56	1–2	Bernard Johnson Coliseum (2,452); Huntsville, TX
11/23/2015*; 6:30 pm		LSU–Alexandria	W 85–50	2–2	Bernard Johnson Coliseum (581); Huntsville, TX
11/28/2015*; 1:00 pm		vs. No. 14 Florida State; LIU Turkey Classic	L 37–94	2–3	Steinberg Wellness Center (129); Brooklyn, NY
11/29/2015*; 11:00 am		at LIU Brooklyn; LIU Turkey Classic	W 63–56	3–3	Steinberg Wellness Center (427); Brooklyn, NY
12/14/2015*; 6:00 pm		at Texas Southern	W 53–51	4–3	Health and Physical Education Arena (245); Houston, TX
12/17/2015*; 6:30 pm		Rice	L 46–58	4–4	Bernard Johnson Coliseum (719); Huntsville, TX
12/19/2015*; 7:00 pm, ESPN3		at Kansas State	L 50–78	4–5	Bramlage Coliseum (3,955); Manhattan, KS
12/27/2015*; 2:00 pm, LHN		at No. 5 Texas	L 49–83	4–6	Frank Erwin Center (3,123); Austin, TX
Southland Conference regular season
01/02/2016; 2:00 pm		at Incarnate Word	W 65–60	5–6 (1–0)	McDermott Center (335); San Antonio, TX
01/04/2016; 5:30 pm		at Northwestern State	L 49–69	5–7 (1–1)	Prather Coliseum (1,013); Natchitoches, LA
01/07/2016; 6:30 pm		Southeastern Louisiana	W 80–56	6–7 (2–1)	Bernard Johnson Coliseum (568); Huntsville, TX
01/09/2016; 2:00 pm		New Orleans	W 64–52	7–7 (3–1)	Bernard Johnson Coliseum (345); Huntsville, TX
01/13/2016; 6:30 pm		Nicholls State	L 63–67	7–8 (3–2)	Bernard Johnson Coliseum (781); Huntsville, TX
01/16/2016; 1:00 pm		at McNeese State	L 79–82	7–9 (3–3)	Burton Coliseum (453); Lake Charles, LA
01/21/2016; 6:30 pm		Abilene Christian	L 76–87	7–10 (3–4)	Bernard Johnson Coliseum (1,009); Huntsville, TX
01/23/2016; 4:00 pm, ESPN3		at Stephen F. Austin	L 63–70	7–11 (3–5)	William R. Johnson Coliseum (5,274); Nacogdoches, TX
01/27/2016; 7:00 pm, ESPN3		at Lamar	W 78–76	8–11 (4–5)	Montagne Center (752); Beaumont, TX
01/30/2016; 4:00 pm		at Houston Baptist	L 63–67	8–12 (4–6)	Sharp Gymnasium (712); Houston, TX
02/06/2016; 2:00 pm		at Texas A&M–Corpus Christi	L 71–81	8–13 (4–7)	American Bank Center (865); Corpus Christi, TX
02/10/2016; 7:00 pm		at Abilene Christian	L 55–67	8–14 (4–8)	Moody Coliseum (1,009); Abilene, TX
02/13/2016; 2:00 pm		Houston Baptist	W 78–70	9–14 (5–8)	Bernard Johnson Coliseum (657); Huntsville, TX
02/20/2016; 2:00 pm		Central Arkansas	L 63–73	9–15 (5–9)	Bernard Johnson Coliseum (455); Huntsville, TX
02/24/2016; 7:00 pm		at Central Arkansas	L 53–72	9–16 (5–10)	Farris Center (1,905); Conway, AR
02/27/2016; 4:30 pm, ESPN3		Texas A&M–Corpus Christi	W 75–57	10–16 (6–10)	Bernard Johnson Coliseum (435); Huntsville, TX
03/02/2016; 6:00 pm		Lamar	W 78–75	11–16 (7–10)	Bernard Johnson Coliseum (528); Huntsville, TX
03/05/2016; 4:30 pm, ESPN3		Stephen F. Austin	L 59–65	11–17 (7–11)	Bernard Johnson Coliseum (945); Huntsville, TX
Southland Women's Tournament
03/10/2016; 1:30 pm		vs. Nicholls State; First Round	W 73–64	12–17	Merrell Center (705); Katy, TX
03/11/2016; 1:30 pm		vs. Stephen F. Austin; Quarterfinals	W 78–70	13–17	Merrell Center; Katy, TX
03/12/2016; 3:30 pm, ESPN3		vs. Northwestern State; Semifinals	W 78–71	14–17	Merrell Center (1,283); Katy, TX
03/13/2016; 11:30 am, CBSSN		vs. Central Arkansas; Championship Game	L 62–69	14–18	Merrell Center (882); Katy, TX
*Non-conference game. ^{#}Rankings from AP Poll. (#) Tournament seedings in parentheses. All times are in Central Time.

== See also ==
- 2015–16 Sam Houston State Bearkats men's basketball team
