= 2015–16 Northwestern State Lady Demons basketball team =

Intercollegiate basketball season

2015–16 Northwestern State Lady Demons basketball

WBI, First Round
- Conference: Southland Conference
- Record: 19–12 (13–5 Southland)
- Head coach: Brooke Stoehr & Scott Stoehr (4th season)
- Assistant coach: Lindsey Hicks
- Home arena: Prather Coliseum

2015–16 Southland Conference women's basketball standings
	Conf.				Overall
Team	W		L	PCT	W		L	PCT
Abilene Christian*	17	–	1	.944	26	–	4	.867
Central Arkansas †	16	–	2	.889	28	–	4	.875
Northwestern State	13	–	5	.722	19	–	12	.613
Stephen F. Austin	12	–	6	.667	18	–	12	.600
McNeese State	11	–	7	.611	20	–	13	.606
Houston Baptist	9	–	9	.500	14	–	15	.483
Nicholls State	8	–	10	.444	10	–	19	.345
Sam Houston State	7	–	11	.389	14	–	18	.438
Lamar	7	–	11	.389	12	–	19	.387
Texas A&M–CC	6	–	12	.333	9	–	20	.310
New Orleans	5	–	13	.278	8	–	19	.296
Incarnate Word*	3	–	15	.167	6	–	23	.207
SE Louisiana	3	–	15	.167	4	–	25	.138
† 2016 Southland tournament winner As of March 18, 2016 *ineligible for postseason play due to Div. I transition Rankings from AP poll

The 2015–16 Northwestern State Lady Demons basketball team represented Northwestern State University during the 2015–16 NCAA Division I women's basketball season. The Demons, led by fourth-year co-head coaches Brooke Stoehr and Scott Stoehr, played their home games at Prather Coliseum and were members of the Southland Conference. They finished the season 19–12, 13–5 in Southland play to finish in third place. They lost in the semifinals of the Southland women's tournament to Sam Houston State. They were invited to the Women's Basketball Invitational, where they lost in the first round to Louisiana–Lafayette.

On April 18, it was announced that the husband-wife coaching team Brooke Stoehr & Scott Stoehr had resigned their positions and accepted coaching jobs at Louisiana Tech. They finished at Northwestern State with a four-year record of 71–58.

== Roster ==
2015–16 Northwestern State Demons women's basketball team
Players
Coaches

Pos.	#	Name	Height	Year	Previous school	Hometown
F	00	Emerald Mayfield	5 ft 11 in (1.8 m)	Fr	Bowie HS	Arlington, TX
G	3	Keisha Lee	5 ft 5 in (1.65 m)	Sr	Denham Springs HS	Denham Springs, LA
G	5	Sami Thomas	5 ft 5 in (1.65 m)	So	Pickering HS	Leesville, LA
F	11	Meghan Cross	6 ft 0 in (1.83 m)	Sr	Lynnwood HS; LSU-Eunice	Lynnwood, WA
G	12	Shahd Abboud	5 ft 11 in (1.8 m)	Jr	Jacksonville College	Nazareth, Israel
F	13	Janelle Perez	5 ft 2 in (1.57 m)	Sr	Horizon HS	El Paso, TX
G	14	Jackie Perez	5 ft 5 in (1.65 m)	So	Americas HS	El Paso, TX
F	22	Libba Gilliam	6 ft 1 in (1.85 m)	Fr	Madison Academy	Huntsville, AL
F	24	Ndey Sonko	6 ft 1 in (1.85 m)	So	Meadowdale HS	Edmonds, WA
G	30	Beatrice Attura	5 ft 7 in (1.7 m)	Jr	Frisco Liberty HS	Frisco, TX
C	32	Cheyenne Brown	6 ft 2 in (1.88 m)	Fr	Martin's Mill HS	Ben Wheeler, TX
F	44	Tia Youngblood	5 ft 10 in (1.78 m)	So	DeRidder HS	DeRidder, LA

Head coach

- Brooke Stoehr (Louisiana Tech)
- Scott Stoehr (Little Rock)

Assistant coach(es)

- Lindsey Hicks (Purdue)

Legend

- (C) Team captain
- (S) Suspended
- (I) Ineligible
- (W) Walk-on
- Injured
- Current redshirt

Roster

== Media ==
Select Lady Demon basketball games were available via a Northwestern feed at Demons Showcase. Many opponents had a live audio stream available to listen to the games that were not aired on Demons Showcase. NSU TV also broadcast most of the Lady Demons wins, tape-delayed.

== Schedule ==
Date time, TV	Rank^{#}	Opponent^{#}	Result	Record	Site (attendance) city, state
Non-conference regular season
11/13/2015*; 12:30 pm		LeTourneau	W 73–44	1–0	Prather Coliseum (1,714); Natchitoches, LA
11/15/2015*; 5:00 pm		at SMU	L 36–74	1–1	Moody Coliseum (715); Dallas, TX
11/18/2015*; 11:00 am, LHN		at No. 11 Texas	L 33–86	1–2	Frank Erwin Center (7,582); Austin, TX
11/21/2015*; 11:00 am		LSU–Alexandria	W 94–65	2–2	Prather Coliseum (682); Natchitoches, LA
11/23/2015*; 6:30 pm		Central Baptist	W 86–56	3–2	Prather Coliseum (686); Natchitoches, LA
11/27/2015*; 2:00 pm		at New Mexico State; Aggie Hotel Encanto Thanksgiving Classic	L 54–65	3–3	Pan American Center (873); Las Cruces, NM
11/28/2015*; 2:00 pm		vs. Long Beach State; Aggie Hotel Encanto Thanksgiving Classic	L 59–60	3–4	Pan American Center (110); Las Cruces, NM
12/04/2015*; 7:00 pm		at No. 4 Baylor	L 44–86	3–5	Ferrell Center (6,317); Waco, TX
12/12/2015*; 1:00 pm		Grambling State	W 71–62	4–5	Prather Coliseum (714); Natchitoches, LA
12/19/2015*; 12:00 pm		Jackson State	W 59–54	5–5	Prather Coliseum (762); Natchitoches, LA
12/29/2015*; 6:30 pm		Xavier (Louisiana)	W 73–57	6–5	Prather Coliseum (714); Natchitoches, LA
Southland Conference schedule
01/02/2016; 1:00 pm		Houston Baptist	W 55–44	7–5 (1–0)	Prather Coliseum (930); Natchitoches, LA
01/04/2016; 5:30 pm		Sam Houston State	W 69–49	8–5 (2–0)	Prather Coliseum (1,013); Natchitoches, LA
01/07/2016; 7:00 pm		at Abilene Christian	L 46–67	8–6 (2–1)	Moody Coliseum (1,107); Abilene, TX
01/09/2016; 2:00 pm		at Incarnate Word	W 53–48	9–6 (3–1)	McDermott Center (284); San Antonio, TX
01/13/2016; 6:30 pm		Texas A&M–Corpus Christi	W 60–43	10–6 (4–1)	Prather Coliseum (1,013); Natchitoches, LA
01/16/2016; 2:00 pm, ESPN3		at Lamar	W 73–51	11–6 (5–1)	Montagne Center (709); Beaumont, TX
01/20/2016; 6:00 pm		at Nicholls State	L 61–70	11–7 (5–2)	Stopher Gym (515); Thibodaux, LA
01/23/2016; 1:00 pm		at McNeese State	L 74–78 ^{OT}	11–8 (5–3)	Burton Coliseum (1,103); Lake Charles, LA
01/27/2016; 6:30 pm		Central Arkansas	L 49–74	11–9 (5–4)	Prather Coliseum (1,118); Natchitoches, LA
01/30/2016; 1:00 pm		Southeastern Louisiana	W 82–62	12–9 (6–4)	Prather Coliseum (1,330); Natchitoches, LA
02/04/2016; 7:00 pm, ESPN3		at Stephen F. Austin	L 58–62	12–10 (6–5)	William R. Johnson Coliseum (1,330); Nacogdoches, TX
02/10/2016; 6:30 pm		at Central Arkansas	W 60–56	13–10 (7–5)	Farris Center (552); Conway, AR
02/13/2016; 1:00 pm, ESPN3		McNeese State	W 85–64	14–10 (8–5)	Prather Coliseum (1,314); Natchitoches, LA
02/17/2016; 6:30 pm		Nicholls State	W 66–62	15–10 (9–5)	Prather Coliseum (948); Natchitoches, LA
02/20/2016; 1:00 pm		New Orleans	W 70–53	16–10 (10–5)	Prather Coliseum (913); Natchitoches, LA
02/25/2016; 7:00 pm		at Southeastern Louisiana	W 73–58	17–10 (11–5)	University Center (1,330); Hammond, LA
03/03/2016; 5:30 pm		Stephen F. Austin	W 72–51	18–10 (12–5)	Prather Coliseum (1,913); Natchitoches, LA
03/05/2016; 1:00 pm		at New Orleans	W 58–46	19–10 (13–5)	Lakefront Arena (866); New Orleans, LA
Southland Women's Tournament
03/12/2016; 3:30 pm, ESPN3		vs. Sam Houston State; Semifinals	L 71–78	19–11	Merrell Center (1,283); Katy, TX
WBI
03/16/2016*; 5:00 pm		at Louisiana–Lafayette; First Round	L 54–69	19–12	Earl K. Long Gymnasium (803); Lafayette, LA
*Non-conference game. ^{#}Rankings from AP Poll. (#) Tournament seedings in parentheses. All times are in Central Time..

== See also ==
- 2015–16 Northwestern State Demons basketball team
