= 2015–16 Nicholls State Colonels women's basketball team =

Intercollegiate basketball season

2015–16 Nicholls State Colonels women's basketball
- Conference: Southland Conference
- Record: 10–19 (8–10 Southland)
- Head coach: DoBee Plaisance (8th season)
- Assistant coaches: Justin Payne; Kris Goff; Jenny Nash
- Home arena: Stopher Gym

2015–16 Southland Conference women's basketball standings
	Conf.				Overall
Team	W		L	PCT	W		L	PCT
Abilene Christian*	17	–	1	.944	26	–	4	.867
Central Arkansas †	16	–	2	.889	28	–	4	.875
Northwestern State	13	–	5	.722	19	–	12	.613
Stephen F. Austin	12	–	6	.667	18	–	12	.600
McNeese State	11	–	7	.611	20	–	13	.606
Houston Baptist	9	–	9	.500	14	–	15	.483
Nicholls State	8	–	10	.444	10	–	19	.345
Sam Houston State	7	–	11	.389	14	–	18	.438
Lamar	7	–	11	.389	12	–	19	.387
Texas A&M–CC	6	–	12	.333	9	–	20	.310
New Orleans	5	–	13	.278	8	–	19	.296
Incarnate Word*	3	–	15	.167	6	–	23	.207
SE Louisiana	3	–	15	.167	4	–	25	.138
† 2016 Southland tournament winner As of March 18, 2016 *ineligible for postseason play due to Div. I transition Rankings from AP poll

The 2015–16 Nicholls State Colonels women's basketball team represented Nicholls State University during the 2015–16 NCAA Division I women's basketball season. The Colonels, led by eighth year head coach DoBee Plaisance, played their home games at Stopher Gym and were members of the Southland Conference. They finished the season 10–19, 8–10 in Southland play to in seventh place. They lost in the first round of the Southland women's tournament to Sam Houston State.

== Roster ==
2015–16 Nicholls State Colonels women's basketball team
Players
Coaches

Pos.	#	Name	Height	Year	Previous school	Hometown
G	0	Emani White	5 ft 4 in (1.63 m)	Sr	Archbishop Chapelle	New Orleans, LA
C	1	Jovana Mandic	6 ft 4 in (1.93 m)	Sr	The Rock School; UNC Wilmington	Prijedor, Bosnia and Herzegovina
G	3	Tia Charles	5 ft 6 in (1.68 m)	So	John Curtis	New Orleans, LA
G	5	Hope Pawlowski	5 ft 7 in (1.7 m)	RS Jr	Orlando Christian Preparatory	Orlando, FL
F	12	Karissa Black	5 ft 11 in (1.8 m)	Fr	Hendrickson	Pflugerville, TX
G	14	Sammi Deakin-Sharpe	5 ft 8 in (1.73 m)	Fr	Moreton Bay	Brisbane, Australia
G	15	Airi Hamilton	5 ft 8 in (1.73 m)	Fr	Ponchatoula	Natchitoches, LA
G	20	Cassidy Barrios	5 ft 10 in (1.78 m)	Fr	Vandebilt Catholic	Lockport, LA
F	22	Brenisha Coleman	6 ft 0 in (1.83 m)	Fr	Cypress Springs	Cypress, TX
G	24	Taylor Morrison	5 ft 8 in (1.73 m)	Jr	St. Michael HS	Baton Rouge, LA
F	32	LiAnn McCarthy	5 ft 11 in (1.8 m)	RS Sr	Ursuline Academy HS	New Orleans, LA
F	33	Asia Petitte (I) (redshirt)	5 ft 11 in (1.8 m)	So	St. Joseph Central Catholic; Evansville	Charleston, WV
C	40	Marina Lilly	6 ft 3 in (1.91 m)	Jr	Skyline	Dallas, TX

Head coach

- DoBee Plaisance (Southern Miss)

Assistant coach(es)

- Justin Payne (Nicholls State)
- Kris Goff (Southeastern Louisiana)
- Jenny Nash (Nicholls State)

Legend

- (C) Team captain
- (S) Suspended
- (I) Ineligible
- (W) Walk-on
- Injured
- Current redshirt

Roster

== Schedule ==
Date time, TV	Rank^{#}	Opponent^{#}	Result	Record	Site (attendance) city, state
Non-conference regular season
11/13/2015*; 6:00 p.m.		Southern (New Orleans)	W 98–65	1–0	Stopher Gym (455); Thibodaux, LA
11/17/2015*; 6:00 p.m.		Prairie View A&M	L 70–81	1–1	Stopher Gym (611); Thibodaux, LA
11/24/2015*; 8:00 p.m.		at New Mexico	L 43–83	1–2	The Pit (4,963); Albuquerque, NM
11/27/2015*; 7:30 p.m.		vs. Samford; Lady Eagle Thanksgiving Tournament semifinals	L 43–45	1–3	Reed Green Coliseum (1,320); Hattiesburg, MS
11/28/2015*; 2:00 p.m.		vs. Mississippi Valley State; Lady Eagle Thanksgiving Tournament 3rd place game	W 63–54	2–3	Reed Green Coliseum; Hattiesburg, MS
12/01/2015*; 5:15 p.m.		at Troy	L 51–104	2–4	Trojan Arena (729); Troy, AL
12/05/2015*; 1:00 p.m.		Louisiana Tech	L 55–58	2–5	Stopher Gym; Thibodaux, LA
12/12/2015*; 7:00 p.m.		at Louisiana–Monroe	L 57–69	2–6	Fant–Ewing Coliseum (972); Monroe, LA
12/18/2015*; 6:00 p.m.		Jacksonville State	L 49–63	2–7	Stopher Gym (410); Thibodaux, LA
12/29/2015*; 6:00 p.m.		Grambling State	L 65–69	2–8	Stopher Gym (522); Thibodaux, LA
Southland Conference regular season
01/02/2016; 1:00 p.m.		Lamar	W 69–59	3–8 (1–0)	Stopher Gym (401); Thibodaux, LA
01/04/2016; 7:00 p.m.		at Houston Baptist	L 71–80	3–9 (1–1)	Sharp Gymnasium (200); Houston, TX
01/10/2016; 1:00 p.m.		Abilene Christian	L 68–71	3–10 (1–2)	Stopher Gym (487); Thibodaux, LA
01/13/2016; 6:30 p.m.		at Sam Houston State	W 67–63	4–10 (2–2)	Bernard Johnson Coliseum (781); Huntsville, TX
01/16/2016; 4:30 p.m.		at Texas A&M–Corpus Christi	W 64–62 ^{OT}	5–10 (3–2)	American Bank Center (417); Corpus Christi, TX
01/20/2016; 6:00 p.m.		Northwestern State	W 70–61	6–10 (4–2)	Stopher Gym (515); Thibodaux, LA
01/23/2016; 5:30 p.m., ESPN3		Central Arkansas	L 65–71	6–11 (4–3)	Stopher Gym (1,735); Thibodaux, LA
01/27/2016; 7:00 p.m.		at New Orleans	L 55–62	6–12 (4–4)	Lakefront Arena (341); New Orleans, LA
01/30/2016; 2:00 p.m.		at Incarnate Word	W 66–64	7–12 (5–4)	McDermott Center (187); San Antonio, TX
02/03/2016; 6:00 p.m.		Incarnate Word	L 61–63	7–13 (5–5)	Stopher Gym (513); Thibodaux, LA
02/06/2016; 1:00 p.m.		McNeese State	W 85–81	8–13 (6–5)	Stopher Gym (478); Thibodaux, LA
02/13/2016; 1:00 p.m.		at Southeastern Louisiana	L 68–78	8–14 (6–6)	University Center (527); Hammond, LA
02/17/2016; 6:30 p.m.		at Northwestern State	L 62–66	8–15 (6–7)	Prather Coliseum (948); Natchitoches, LA
02/20/2016; 1:00 p.m.		Stephen F. Austin	L 67–89	8–16 (6–8)	Stopher Gym (522); Thibodaux, LA
02/24/2016; 6:00 p.m.		New Orleans	W 70–55	9–16 (7–8)	Stopher Gym (991); Thibodaux, LA
02/27/2016; 1:00 p.m.		at McNeese State	L 62–96	9–17 (7–9)	Burton Coliseum (1,404); Lake Charles, LA
03/02/2016; 7:00 p.m.		at Central Arkansas	L 51–56	9–18 (7–10)	Farris Center (459); Conway, AR
03/05/2016; 1:00 p.m.		Southeastern Louisiana	W 70–52	10–18 (8–10)	Stopher Gym (953); Thibodaux, LA
Southland Conference tournament
03/10/2016; 1:30 p.m.		vs. Sam Houston State; First Round	L 64–73	10–19	Merrell Center (705); Katy, TX
*Non-conference game. ^{#}Rankings from AP Poll. (#) Tournament seedings in parentheses. All times are in Central Time.

== See also ==
- 2015–16 Nicholls State Colonels men's basketball team
