= 2015–16 Lamar Lady Cardinals basketball team =

Intercollegiate basketball season

2015–16 Lamar Lady Cardinals basketball
- Conference: Southland Conference
- Record: 12–19 (7–11 Southland)
- Head coach: Robin Harmony (3rd season)
- Assistant coaches: Randy Schneider (3rd season); Candace Walker (3rd season); Joya Whittington (1st season)
- Home arena: Montagne Center (Capacity: 10,080)

2015–16 Southland Conference women's basketball standings
	Conf.				Overall
Team	W		L	PCT	W		L	PCT
Abilene Christian*	17	–	1	.944	26	–	4	.867
Central Arkansas †	16	–	2	.889	28	–	4	.875
Northwestern State	13	–	5	.722	19	–	12	.613
Stephen F. Austin	12	–	6	.667	18	–	12	.600
McNeese State	11	–	7	.611	20	–	13	.606
Houston Baptist	9	–	9	.500	14	–	15	.483
Nicholls State	8	–	10	.444	10	–	19	.345
Sam Houston State	7	–	11	.389	14	–	18	.438
Lamar	7	–	11	.389	12	–	19	.387
Texas A&M–CC	6	–	12	.333	9	–	20	.310
New Orleans	5	–	13	.278	8	–	19	.296
Incarnate Word*	3	–	15	.167	6	–	23	.207
SE Louisiana	3	–	15	.167	4	–	25	.138
† 2016 Southland tournament winner As of March 18, 2016 *ineligible for postseason play due to Div. I transition Rankings from AP poll

The 2015–16 Lamar Lady Cardinals basketball team represented Lamar University during the 2015–16 NCAA Division I women's basketball season. The Lady Cardinals, led by third year head coach Robin Harmony, played their home games at the Montagne Center and are members of the Southland Conference. They finished the season with a 12-19 overall record and a 7-11 conference record. Qualifying for the conference tournament, the Lady Cardinals won the first game against Houston Baptist and were eliminated by McNeese State.

Two Lady Cardinals were recognized by the Southland Conference at the conclusion of the regular season. Chastadie Barrs was named Southland Conference Defensive Player of the Year. Kiara Desamours was named Southland Conference Freshman of the year. Both players also received conference honorable mention honors.

== Roster ==
2015–16 Lamar Lady Cardinals women's basketball team
Players
Coaches

Pos.	#	Name	Height	Year	Previous school	Hometown
G	1	Addesha Collins	5 ft 3 in (1.6 m)	Sr	Saks HS	Anniston, Ala.
F/C	3	Marquelle Williams	6 ft 1 in (1.85 m)	So	Rogers HS	Toledo, Ohio
G	5	Baileigh O'Dell	5 ft 3 in (1.6 m)	So	Verdigris HS	Claremore, Okla.
G	10	Chastadie Barrs	5 ft 7 in (1.7 m)	Fr	DeSoto HS	DeSoto, TX
F	12	Kiara Desamours	5 ft 9 in (1.75 m)	Fr	Fort Myers, FL
G	13	Teleshia Riley	5 ft 10 in (1.78 m)	Jr	St. Edmond Campion Secondary	Brampton, Ontario
G	15	DeJa Roberts	5 ft 6 in (1.68 m)	Fr	Davie, FL
G	23	Moe Kinard	5 ft 9 in (1.75 m)	RS Fr	New Iberia, LA
G	32	Khali Pippins-Tyron	5 ft 7 in (1.7 m)	Fr	Duncanville, TX
F	33	Kiandra Bowers	5 ft 11 in (1.8 m)	Jr	Dwyer HS	West Palm Beach, Fla.
F	35	Laka Blache	6 ft 0 in (1.83 m)	So	Whitehaven	Memphis, Tenn.
F	45	Lejha Smith	5 ft 11 in (1.8 m)	So	Coral Springs Charter School	Fort Lauderdale, Fla.

Head coach

Robin Harmony

Assistant coach(es)

Randy Schneider
Candace Walker
Levar Willis

Legend

- (C) Team captain
- (S) Suspended
- (I) Ineligible
- (W) Walk-on
- Injured
- Current redshirt

Roster
Last update: 2018-02-28

== Schedule ==
Date time, TV	Opponent	Result	Record	High points	High rebounds	High assists	Site (attendance) city, state
Out of Conference Schedule
11/13/2015*; 11:00 am	at Oklahoma State	L 45–90	0–1	15 – Barrs, C.	6 – Barrs, C.	3 – Edwards, J.	Gallagher-Iba Arena (3,591); Stillwater, OK
11/17/2015*; 7:00 pm	at Utah	L 67–71	0–2	21 – Barrs, C.	8 – Desamours, K.	5 – Barrs, C.	Jon M. Huntsman Center (543); Salt Lake City, UT
11/19/2015*; 7:00 pm	Louisiana College	W 99–34	1–2	17 – Collins, A.	10 – Williams, M.	11 – Barrs, C.	Montagne Center (755); Beaumont, TX
11/22/2015*; 12:30 pm	at Northern Arizona	L 63–75	1–3	16 – Edwards, J.	8 – Barrs, C.	4 – Collins, A.	J.C. Rolle Activity Center (306); Flagstaff, AZ
11/28/2015*; 3:00 pm	at Loyola	L 71–82	1–4	26 – Edwards, J.	5 – Collins, A.	3 – Collins, A.	Joseph J. Gentile Arena (197); Chicago, IL
11/30/2015*; 7:00 pm	Schreiner College	W 60–41	2–4	20 – Edwards, J.	9 – Edwards, J.	4 – Barrs, C.	Montagne Center (611); Beaumont, TX
12/05/2015*; 6:00 pm	at Prairie View A&M	L 72–80	2–5	25 – Collins, A.	6 – Blache, L.	5 – Barrs, C.	William Nicks Building (327); Prairie View, TX
12/14/2015*; 7:00 pm	Canisius	L 55–57	2–6	20 – Edwards, D	11 – Desamours; Barrs	2 – Edwards, J	Montagne Center (521); Beaumont, TX
12/17/2015*; 7:00 pm	Texas A&M–Kingsville	W 82–66	3–6	31 – Edwards, D	10 – Blache, L.	5 – Desamours, K.	Montagne Center (588); Beaumont, TX
12/20/2015*; 2:00 pm	at Missouri	L 57–91	3–7	18 – Collins, A.	9 – Barrs, C.	3 – Barrs; Edwards	Mizzou Arena (3,358); Columbia, MO
12/30/2015*; 7:00 pm	Howard Payne	W 88–50	4–7	17 – Edwards, J	17 – Blache, L	3 – Barrs, C.	Montagne Center (638); Beaumont, TX
Southland Conference Schedule
01/02/2016; 1:00 pm	at Nicholls State	L 59–69	4–8 (0–1)	26 – Collins, A.	6 – Blache, L.	4 – Edwards, J	Stopher Gym (401); Thibodaux, LA
01/04/2016; 5:00 pm, ESPN3	New Orleans	W 79–52	5–8 (1–1)	18 – Collins, A.	13 – Desamours, K.	4 – Collins; Barrs	Montagne Center (718); Beaumont, TX
01/07/2016; 7:00 pm, ESPN3	Texas A&M-Corpus Christi	W 75–70	6–8 (2–1)	25 – Collins, A.	9 – Desamours, K.	4 – Barrs, C.	Montagne Center (538); Beaumont, TX
01/11/2016; 5:30 pm	at Central Arkansas	L 49–74	6–9 (2–2)	14 – Collins, A.	8 – Edwards, D	4 – Barrs, C.	Farris Center (361); Conway, AR
01/14/2016; 7:00 pm	at Southeastern Louisiana	L 66–73	6–10 (2–3)	24 – Collins, A	12 – Desamours, K.	8 – Barrs, C	University Center (530); Hammond, LA
01/16/2016; 2:00 pm, ESPN3	Northwestern State	L 51–73	6–11 (2–4)	14 – Desamours, K	7 – Blache, L	3 – Barrs, C.	Montagne Center (709); Beaumont, TX
01/21/2016; 7:00 pm, ESPN3	at Stephen F. Austin	W 64–60	7–11 (3–4)	25 – O'Dell B	8 – Desamours, K	4 – Barrs; Collins	William R. Johnson Coliseum (682); Nacogdoches, TX
01/23/2016; 2:00 pm, ESPN3	Houston Baptist	W 77–70	8–11 (4–4)	24 – Collins, A	9 – Barrs, C	4 – O'Dell, B	Montagne Center (826); Beaumont, TX
01/27/2016; 7:00 pm, ESPN3	Sam Houston State	L 76–78	8–12 (4–5)	20 – O'Dell, B.	7 – Desamours, K.	4 – Barrs, C.	Montagne Center (752); Beaumont, TX
01/30/2016; 2:00 pm	at Abilene Christian	L 62–90	8–13 (4–6)	23 – Desamours, K.	11 – Desamours; Blache	3 – Desamours; Riley	Moody Coliseum (1,306); Abilene, TX
02/04/2016; 7:00 pm, ESPN3	Abilene Christian	W 63–54	9–13 (5–6)	22 – Collins, A.	12 – Barrs, C.	5 – Collins, A.	Montagne Center (687); Beaumont, TX
02/06/2016; 2:00 pm, ESPN3	Incarnate Word	W 59–49	10–13 (6–6)	22 – Collins, A.	9 – Blache, L.	2 – Three players	Montagne Center (888); Beaumont, TX
02/10/2016; 7:00 pm	at Houston Baptist	L 66–77	10–14 (6–7)	26 – Collins, A.	14 – Desamours, K.	1 – Collins, A.	Sharp Gymnasium (230); Houston, TX
02/18/2016; 7:00 pm, ESPN3	Stephen F. Austin	L 77–79	10–15 (6–8)	29 – Collins, A.	8 – Collins, A.	5 – Barrs, C.	Montagne Center (751); Beaumont, TX
02/20/2016; 1:00 pm	at McNeese State; Battle of the Border	L 84–92	10–16 (6–9)	27 – Collins, A.	10 – Desamours, K.	4 – Collins, A.	Burton Coliseum (1,403); Lake Charles, LA
02/24/2016; 7:00 pm, ESPN3	McNeese State; Battle of the Border	L 69–76	10–17 (6–10)	16 – Desamours, K.	12 – Blache, L.	4 – Barrs, C.	Montagne Center (737); Beaumont, TX
02/27/2016; 2:00 pm	at Incarnate Word	W 67–61	11–17 (7–10)	16 – Blache, L.	10 – Blache, L.	8 – Barrs, C.	McDermott Center (676); San Antonio, TX
03/02/2016; 6:30 pm	at Sam Houston State	L 75–78	11–18 (7–11)	14 – O'Dell, B.	13 – Blache, L.	7 – Barrs, C.	Bernard Johnson Coliseum (528); Huntsville, TX
Southland Conference Tournament
03/10/2016; 11:00 am, ESPN3	vs. Houston Baptist; First Round	W 98–95 ^{2OT}	12–18	23 – Collins, A.	16 – Barrs, C.	4 – Barrs, C.	Merrell Center; Katy, TX
03/11/2016; 11:00 am, ESPN3	vs. McNeese State; Quarterfinals	L 78–88	12–19	35 – Collins, A.	7 – Collins; Blache	5 – Barrs, C.	Merrell Center; Katy, TX
*Non-conference game. ^{#}Rankings from AP Poll. (#) Tournament seedings in parentheses. All times are in Central Time.

== See also ==
2015–16 Lamar Cardinals basketball team
