= 2015–16 Central Arkansas Sugar Bears basketball team =

Intercollegiate basketball season

2015–16 Central Arkansas Sugar Bears basketball

Southland Tournament Champions

NCAA Women's Tournament, first round
- Conference: Southland Conference
- Record: 28–4 (16–2 Southland)
- Head coach: Sandra Rushing (4th season)
- Assistant coaches: Destinee Rogers; Greg Long; Brooke Rhodes
- Home arena: Farris Center

2015–16 Southland Conference women's basketball standings
	Conf.				Overall
Team	W		L	PCT	W		L	PCT
Abilene Christian*	17	–	1	.944	26	–	4	.867
Central Arkansas †	16	–	2	.889	28	–	4	.875
Northwestern State	13	–	5	.722	19	–	12	.613
Stephen F. Austin	12	–	6	.667	18	–	12	.600
McNeese State	11	–	7	.611	20	–	13	.606
Houston Baptist	9	–	9	.500	14	–	15	.483
Nicholls State	8	–	10	.444	10	–	19	.345
Sam Houston State	7	–	11	.389	14	–	18	.438
Lamar	7	–	11	.389	12	–	19	.387
Texas A&M–CC	6	–	12	.333	9	–	20	.310
New Orleans	5	–	13	.278	8	–	19	.296
Incarnate Word*	3	–	15	.167	6	–	23	.207
SE Louisiana	3	–	15	.167	4	–	25	.138
† 2016 Southland tournament winner As of March 18, 2016 *ineligible for postseason play due to Div. I transition Rankings from AP poll

The 2015–16 Central Arkansas Sugar Bears basketball team represented the University of Central Arkansas during the 2015–16 NCAA Division I women's basketball season. The Sugar Bears, led by fourth-year head coach Sandra Rushing, played their home games at the Farris Center. They were members of the Southland Conference. They finished the season 28–4, 16–2 in Southland play to finish in second place. They won the Southland women's tournament to earn an automatic trip to the NCAA women's tournament for the first time in school history. They lost to Louisville in the first round.

== Roster ==
2015–16 Central Arkansas Sugar Bears women's basketball team
Players
Coaches

Pos.	#	Name	Height	Year	Previous school	Hometown
F	4	Raquel Logan	6 ft 1 in (1.85 m)	Jr	West Memphis HS	West Memphis, AR
G	5	Jameka Watkins	5 ft 6 in (1.68 m)	Sr	England HS	England, AR
G	10	Brianna Mullins	5 ft 6 in (1.68 m)	Jr	Nevada HS	Rosston, AR
F	11	Kendara Watts	5 ft 10 in (1.78 m)	Sr	Fairfield HS; Shelton State CC	Fairfield, AL
F	15	Tieraney Paylor	5 ft 10 in (1.78 m)	Fr	Ridgeway HS	Memphis, TN
G	21	Angel Williams	5 ft 7 in (1.7 m)	So	Bellaire HS	Bellaire, TX
G	22	Maggie Proffitt	5 ft 7 in (1.7 m)	Jr	Starkville Academy	Columbus, MS
F	23	Taylor Baudoin	5 ft 11 in (1.8 m)	So	Bessemer HS; Jones County JC	Columbus, MS
C	24	Taylor Strickland	5 ft 11 in (1.8 m)	Jr	Rogers HS; UMKC	Fayetteville, AR
G	25	Olivia McWilliams	5 ft 7 in (1.7 m)	RS Fr	eStem HS	Little Rock, AR
G	33	Alexis Hardaway	5 ft 8 in (1.73 m)	Jr	North Little Rock HS; Tyler JC/Arkansas State	North Little Rock, AR
C	50	Taisiya Novokreschevnova	6 ft 0 in (1.83 m)	Sr	Frank Phillips College	Moscow, Russia

Head coach

- Sandra Rushing (Alabama)

Assistant coach(es)

- Destinee Rogers (Central Arkansas)
- Greg Long (Chowan)
- Brooke Rhodes (Southern Miss)

Legend

- (C) Team captain
- (S) Suspended
- (I) Ineligible
- (W) Walk-on
- Injured
- Current redshirt

Roster

== Schedule ==
Date time, TV	Rank^{#}	Opponent^{#}	Result	Record	Site (attendance) city, state
Non-conference regular schedule
11/13/2015*; 7:00 pm		Hendrix College	W 72–43	1–0	Farris Center (845); Conway, AR
11/15/2015*; 2:00 pm		at No. 4 Tennessee	L 47–102	1–1	Thompson–Boling Arena (9,709); Knoxville, TN
11/21/2015*; 1:00 pm		at Murray State	W 61–51	2–1	CFSB Center (212); Murray, KY
11/24/2015*; 7:00 pm		Alcorn State	W 58–35	3–1	Farris Center (385); Conway, AR
11/28/2015*; 2:00 pm		Murray State	W 50–40	4–1	Farris Center (312); Conway, AR
12/03/2015*; 6:00 pm		Crowley's Ridge	W 93–38	5–1	Farris Center (515); Conway, AR
12/13/2015*; 2:00 pm		at Southeast Missouri State	W 63–54	6–1	Show Me Center (928); Cape Girardeau, MO
12/15/2015*; 6:00 pm		Central Baptist	W 70–37	7–1	Farris Center (332); Conway, AR
12/19/2015*; 12:00 pm		vs. Campbell; Oceanfront Holiday Classic	W 57–34	8–1	UNF Arena; Jacksonville, FL
12/20/2015*; 12:00 pm		vs. South Carolina State; Oceanfront Holiday Classic	W 51–38	9–1	UNF Arena; Jacksonville, FL
12/29/2015*; 2:00 pm		Jarvis Christian	W 77–23	10–1	Farris Center (315); Conway, AR
Southland Conference schedule
01/02/2016; 2:00 pm		Abilene Christian	L 49–61	10–2 (0–1)	Farris Center (512); Conway, AR
01/05/2016; 5:30 pm		at Texas A&M–Corpus Christi	W 66–55	11–2 (1–1)	American Bank Center (465); Corpus Christi, TX
01/07/2016; 7:00 pm		at Stephen F. Austin	W 55–53	12–2 (2–1)	William R. Johnson Coliseum (476); Nacogdoches, TX
01/11/2016; 5:30 pm		Lamar	W 74–49	13–2 (3–1)	Farris Center (361); Conway, AR
01/13/2016; 7:00 pm		Houston Baptist	W 45–44	14–2 (4–1)	Farris Center (562); Conway, AR
01/21/2016; 7:00 pm		at New Orleans	W 59–44	15–2 (5–1)	Lakefront Arena (302); New Orleans, LA
01/23/2016; 5:30 pm, ESPN3		at Nicholls State	W 71–65	16–2 (6–1)	Stopher Gym (1,735); Thibodaux, LA
01/27/2016; 6:30 pm		at Northwestern State	W 74–49	17–2 (7–1)	Prather Coliseum (1,118); Natchitoches, LA
02/03/2016; 7:00 pm		Southeastern Louisiana	W 80–58	18–2 (8–1)	Farris Center (722); Conway, AR
02/06/2016; 2:00 pm		New Orleans	W 67–55	19–2 (9–1)	Farris Center (1,585); Conway, AR
02/10/2016; 7:00 pm		Northwestern State	L 56–60	19–3 (9–2)	Farris Center (552); Conway, AR
02/13/2016; 2:00 pm		at Incarnate Word	W 76–57	20–3 (10–2)	McDermott Center (275); San Antonio, TX
02/17/2016; 6:00 pm		at McNeese State	W 70–56	21–3 (11–2)	Burton Coliseum (614); Lake Charles, LA
02/20/2016; 2:00 pm		at Sam Houston State	W 73–63	22–3 (12–2)	Bernard Johnson Coliseum (455); Huntsville, TX
02/24/2016; 7:00 pm		Sam Houston State	W 72–53	23–3 (13–2)	Farris Center (1,905); Conway, AR
02/27/2016; 1:00 pm		at Southeastern Louisiana	W 64–60	24–3 (14–2)	University Center (694); Hammond, LA
03/02/2016; 7:00 pm		Nicholls State	W 56–51	25–3 (15–2)	Farris Center (459); Conway, AR
03/05/2016; 2:00 pm		McNeese State	W 76–52	26–3 (16–2)	Farris Center (976); Conway, AR
Southland Women's Tournament
03/12/2016; 1:00 pm, ESPN3		vs. McNeese State; Semifinals	W 72–64	27–3	Merrell Center; Katy, TX
03/13/2016; 11:30 am, CBSSN		vs. Sam Houston State; Championship Game	W 69–62	28–3	Merrell Center (882); Katy, TX
NCAA Women's Tournament
03/18/2016*; 2:30 pm, ESPN2	(14 D)	at (3 D) No. 8 Louisville; First Round	L 60–87	28–4	KFC Yum! Center (5,823); Louisville, KY
*Non-conference game. ^{#}Rankings from AP Poll. (#) Tournament seedings in parentheses. D=Dallas Region. All times are in Central Time.

== See also ==
- 2015–16 Central Arkansas Bears basketball team
