= 2015–16 Houston Baptist Huskies women's basketball team =

Intercollegiate basketball season

2015–16 Houston Baptist Huskies women's basketball
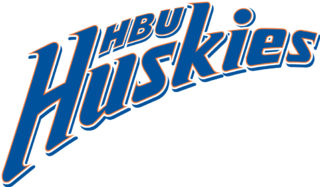
- Conference: Southland Conference
- Record: 14–15 (9–9 Southland)
- Head coach: Donna Finnie (3rd season)
- Assistant coaches: Ben Chase; Lauren Tippert; Becca Allison
- Home arena: Sharp Gymnasium

2015–16 Southland Conference women's basketball standings
| | Conf. | | | | Overall |
| Team | W | | L | PCT | W | | L | PCT |
|---|---|---|---|---|---|---|---|---|
| Abilene Christian* | 17 | – | 1 | .944 | 26 | – | 4 | .867 |
| Central Arkansas † | 16 | – | 2 | .889 | 28 | – | 4 | .875 |
| Northwestern State | 13 | – | 5 | .722 | 19 | – | 12 | .613 |
| Stephen F. Austin | 12 | – | 6 | .667 | 18 | – | 12 | .600 |
| McNeese State | 11 | – | 7 | .611 | 20 | – | 13 | .606 |
| Houston Baptist | 9 | – | 9 | .500 | 14 | – | 15 | .483 |
| Nicholls State | 8 | – | 10 | .444 | 10 | – | 19 | .345 |
| Sam Houston State | 7 | – | 11 | .389 | 14 | – | 18 | .438 |
| Lamar | 7 | – | 11 | .389 | 12 | – | 19 | .387 |
| Texas A&M–CC | 6 | – | 12 | .333 | 9 | – | 20 | .310 |
| New Orleans | 5 | – | 13 | .278 | 8 | – | 19 | .296 |
| Incarnate Word* | 3 | – | 15 | .167 | 6 | – | 23 | .207 |
| SE Louisiana | 3 | – | 15 | .167 | 4 | – | 25 | .138 |
† 2016 Southland tournament winner As of March 18, 2016 *ineligible for postseason play due to Div. I transition Rankings from AP poll

The 2015–16 Houston Baptist Huskies women's basketball team represented Houston Baptist University in the 2015–16 college basketball season. The Huskies, led by third-year head coach Donna Finnie, played their home games at the Sharp Gymnasium and were members of the Southland Conference. They finished the season 14–15, 9–9 in Southland play to finish in sixth place. They lost in the first round of the Southland women's tournament to Lamar.

== Media ==
All Houston Baptist games were broadcast online live by Legacy Sports Network (LSN), with audio for all road games and video for all home games.

== Roster ==
2015–16 Houston Baptist Huskies women's basketball team
Players
Coaches

| Pos. | # | Name | Height | Year | Previous school | Hometown |
|---|---|---|---|---|---|---|
| G | 3 | Heidi Sihvola | 5 ft 8 in (1.73 m) | Jr | Makelanrinne | Helsinki, Finland |
| G | 5 | Lisa Zderadicka | 5 ft 6 in (1.68 m) | RS Fr | HAK Korneuburg | Vienna, Austria |
| G | 10 | Bria Johnson (C) | 5 ft 6 in (1.68 m) | Fr | Sunnyvale | Sunnyvale, TX |
| G | 14 | Amanda Johnson | 6 ft 1 in (1.85 m) | Fr | Georgetown | Georgetown, TX |
| F | 20 | Charlotte Hodges | 6 ft 0 in (1.83 m) | Fr | Kingwood | Kingwood, TX |
| G | 21 | Rachel Arthur | 5 ft 7 in (1.7 m) | Sr | Atascocita | Humble, TX |
| F | 22 | Lauren Calver (redshirt) | 6 ft 1 in (1.85 m) | Fr | Heathcote | Helensburgh, Australia |
| F | 23 | Anna Strickland (C) | 6 ft 1 in (1.85 m) | Sr | The Woodlands; Harding | The Woodlands, TX |
| G | 24 | Meghan Shank | 5 ft 8 in (1.73 m) | Sr | Ventura | Ventura, CA |
| F | 25 | Monet Neal (C) | 5 ft 10 in (1.78 m) | Sr | William Howard Taft | San Antonio, TX |
| F | 33 | Brooklyn Moore | 5 ft 11 in (1.8 m) | Fr | Wylie | Murphy, TX |
| G | 35 | Ekemini Essien | 5 ft 9 in (1.75 m) | Jr | Dallas Lutheran | Carrollton, TX |
| C | 45 | Veronika Kirienko | 6 ft 4 in (1.93 m) | Fr | School 168 | Tashkent, Uzbekistan |
| C | 55 | Kennedy Collins | 6 ft 1 in (1.85 m) | Fr | Cedar Creek | Bastrop, TX |

Head coach

- Donna Finnie (Heriot–Watt)

Assistant coach(es)

- Ben Chase (Emerson)
- Lauren Tippet (Sam Houston State)
- Becca Allison (Old Dominion)

Legend

- (C) Team captain
- (S) Suspended
- (I) Ineligible
- (W) Walk-on
- Injured
- Current redshirt

Roster

== Schedule and results ==
| Date time, TV | Rank^{#} | Opponent^{#} | Result | Record | Site (attendance) city, state |
Exhibition
| 11/06/2015*; 7:00 pm | | Southwestern | W 90–56 | | Sharp Gymnasium; Houston, TX |
Out of conference schedule
| 11/13/2015*; 9:00 pm, RTSW | | at New Mexico | L 57–65 | 0–1 | The Pit (12,269); Albuquerque, NM |
| 11/15/2015*; 3:00 pm | | at UTEP | L 63–98 | 0–2 | Don Haskins Center (977); El Paso, TX |
| 11/20/2015*; 7:00 pm | | Paul Quinn | W 95–42 | 1–2 | Sharp Gymnasium (418); Houston, TX |
| 11/27/2015*; 2:00 pm | | vs. Nebraska–Omaha; UTSA Thanksgiving Classic | W 64–51 | 2–2 | Convocation Center (150); San Antonio, TX |
| 11/29/2015*; 2:00 pm | | at UTSA; UTSA Thanksgiving Classic | L 50–79 | 2–3 | Convocation Center (400); San Antonio, TX |
| 12/02/2015*; 2:00 pm | | Trinity | W 60–46 | 3–3 | Sharp Gymnasium (422); Houston, TX |
| 12/05/2015*; 2:00 pm | | at Texas Southern | W 77–65 | 4–3 | Health and Physical Education Arena (214); Houston, TX |
| 12/16/2015*; 7:00 pm | | Texas State | L 66–71 | 4–4 | Sharp Gymnasium (610); Houston, TX |
| 12/19/2015*; 1:00 pm | | Texas–Arlington | L 40–64 | 4–5 | Sharp Gymnasium (150); Houston, TX |
| 12/28/2015*; 2:00 pm | | Huston–Tillotson | W 96–65 | 5–5 | Sharp Gymnasium (385); Houston, TX |
Southland Conference schedule
| 01/02/2016; 1:00 pm | | at Northwestern State | L 44–55 | 5–6 (0–1) | Prather Coliseum (930); Natchitoches, LA |
| 01/04/2016; 7:00 pm | | McNeese State | L 64–71 | 5–7 (0–2) | Sharp Gymnasium (285); Houston, TX |
| 01/07/2016; 7:00 pm | | Nicholls State | W 80–71 | 6–7 (1–2) | Sharp Gymnasium (200); Houston, TX |
| 01/09/2016; 4:00 pm | | Southeastern Louisiana | W 64–56 | 7–7 (2–2) | Sharp Gymnasium (388); Houston, TX |
| 01/13/2016; 7:00 pm | | at Central Arkansas | L 44–45 | 7–8 (2–3) | Farris Center (562); Conway, AR |
| 01/16/2016; 4:00 pm, ESPN3 | | at New Orleans | W 71–51 | 8–8 (3–3) | Lakefront Arena (1,066); New Orleans, LA |
| 01/23/2016; 2:00 pm, ESPN3 | | at Lamar | L 70–77 | 8–9 (3–4) | Montagne Center (826); Beaumont, TX |
| 01/27/2016; 7:00 pm | | at Abilene Christian | L 60–77 | 8–10 (3–5) | Moody Coliseum (1,227); Abliene, TX |
| 01/30/2016; 4:00 pm | | Sam Houston State | W 67–63 | 9–10 (4–5) | Sharp Gymnasium (712); Houston, TX |
| 02/03/2016; 7:00 pm | | at Texas A&M–Corpus Christi | W 73–59 | 10–10 (5–5) | Dugan Wellness Center (737); Corpus Christi, TX |
| 02/06/2016; 4:00 pm | | Stephen F. Austin | L 50–64 | 10–11 (5–6) | Sharp Gymnasium (897); Houston, TX |
| 02/10/2016; 7:00 pm | | Lamar | W 77–66 | 11–11 (6–6) | Sharp Gymnasium (230); Houston, TX |
| 02/13/2016; 2:00 pm | | at Sam Houston State | L 70–78 | 11–12 (6–7) | Bernard Johnson Coliseum (657); Huntsville, TX |
| 02/18/2016; 6:00 pm | | at Incarnate Word | W 62–61 | 12–12 (7–7) | McDermott Center (450); San Antonio, TX |
| 02/24/2016; 7:00 pm | | Abilene Christian | L 55–76 | 12–13 (7–8) | Sharp Gymnasium (179); Houston, TX |
| 02/27/2016; 3:30 pm, ESPN3 | | at Stephen F. Austin | L 54–66 | 12–14 (7–9) | William R. Johnson Coliseum (2,691); Nacogdoches, TX |
| 03/03/2016; 5:00 pm, ESPN3 | | Texas A&M–Corpus Christi | W 55–51 | 13–14 (8–9) | Sharp Gymnasium (622); Houston, TX |
| 03/05/2016; 12:00 pm | | Incarnate Word | W 64–46 | 14–14 (9–9) | Sharp Gymnasium (508); Houston, TX |
Southland Conference Women's Tournament
| 03/10/2016; 11:00 am, ESPN3 | | vs. Lamar; First Round | L 95–98 ^{2OT} | 14–15 | Merrell Center; Katy, TX |
*Non-conference game. ^{#}Rankings from AP Poll. (#) Tournament seedings in parentheses. All times are in Central.

== See also ==
- 2015–16 Houston Baptist Huskies men's basketball team
