= 2015–16 Abilene Christian Wildcats women's basketball team =

Intercollegiate basketball season

2015–16 Abilene Christian Wildcats women's basketball

Southland Regular Season Champions

WNIT, First Round
- Conference: Southland Conference
- Record: 26–4 (17–1 Southland)
- Head coach: Julie Goodenough (4th season)
- Assistant coaches: Erika Lambert; Kyle Felan; Matt Stine
- Home arena: Moody Coliseum

2015–16 Southland Conference women's basketball standings
	Conf.				Overall
Team	W		L	PCT	W		L	PCT
Abilene Christian*	17	–	1	.944	26	–	4	.867
Central Arkansas †	16	–	2	.889	28	–	4	.875
Northwestern State	13	–	5	.722	19	–	12	.613
Stephen F. Austin	12	–	6	.667	18	–	12	.600
McNeese State	11	–	7	.611	20	–	13	.606
Houston Baptist	9	–	9	.500	14	–	15	.483
Nicholls State	8	–	10	.444	10	–	19	.345
Sam Houston State	7	–	11	.389	14	–	18	.438
Lamar	7	–	11	.389	12	–	19	.387
Texas A&M–CC	6	–	12	.333	9	–	20	.310
New Orleans	5	–	13	.278	8	–	19	.296
Incarnate Word*	3	–	15	.167	6	–	23	.207
SE Louisiana	3	–	15	.167	4	–	25	.138
† 2016 Southland tournament winner As of March 18, 2016 *ineligible for postseason play due to Div. I transition Rankings from AP poll

The 2015–16 Abilene Christian Wildcats women's basketball team represented Abilene Christian University in Texas, United States during the 2015–16 NCAA Division I women's basketball season. The Wildcats, led by third-year head coach Julie Goodenough, played their home games at the Moody Coliseum. This was the third year of a four-year transition phase from D2 to D1. In the third year of transition, Abilene Christian could not participate in the Southland Tournament, but was a Division I counter and was part of the Division I RPI calculation. The Wildcats played a full conference schedule in 2015–16. Although they were not eligible for the Southland Conference and NCAA tournaments, the Wildcats did compete in the WNIT, where they lost in the first round to UTEP. They finished the season 26–4, 17–1 to win the Southland Regular season title.

== Roster ==
2015–16 Abilene Christian Wildcats women's basketball team
Players
Coaches

Pos.	#	Name	Height	Year	Previous school	Hometown
G	1	Sara Williamson	5 ft 10 in (1.78 m)	Fr	Rockwall HS	Rockwall, Texas
G	2	Alyssa Echols	5 ft 7 in (1.7 m)	So	Pflugerville HS	Pflugerville, Texas
F	5	McKenzie Martin	6 ft 2 in (1.88 m)	Fr	Allen HS	Allen, Texas
G	10	Paris Webb	5 ft 4 in (1.63 m)	Sr	Midland HS	Midland, Texas
G	12	Whitney West Swinford	5 ft 7 in (1.7 m)	Sr	Gregory-Portland HS	Portland, Texas
G	15	Alexis Mason	5 ft 9 in (1.75 m)	Jr	McKinney North HS	McKinney, Texas
C	22	Sierra Allen	6 ft 1 in (1.85 m)	So	Roscoe Highland HS	Roscoe, Texas
F	23	Suzzy Dimba	5 ft 11 in (1.8 m)	Jr	Lubbuck Coronado HS	Lubbock, Texas
G	24	Breklyn Wentz	5 ft 2 in (1.57 m)	Fr	Trinity Christian HS	Lubbock, Texas
F	32	Lizzy Dimba	5 ft 11 in (1.8 m)	Jr	Lubbuck Coronado HS	Lubbock, Texas
F	33	Sydney Shelstead	6 ft 1 in (1.85 m)	Jr	Mineral Wells HS	Mineral Wells, Texas
G	42	Hannah Snyder	5 ft 5 in (1.65 m)	Fr	Albany HS	Albany, Texas

Head coach

- Julie Goodenough (Abilene Christian)

Assistant coach(es)

- Erika Lambert (College of Charleston)
- Kyle Felan (Texas A&M)
- Matt Stine (Dayton)

Legend

- (C) Team captain
- (S) Suspended
- (I) Ineligible
- (W) Walk-on
- Injured
- Current redshirt

Roster

== Schedule ==
Date time, TV	Rank^{#}	Opponent^{#}	Result	Record	Site (attendance) city, state
Out of conference schedule
11/14/2015*; 7:00 pm		Wayland Baptist	W 96–71	1–0	Moody Coliseum (1,025); Abilene, Texas
11/16/2015*; 5:30 pm, FCS Atlantic		at Kansas State	L 45–76	1–1	Bramlage Coliseum (3,784); Manhattan, Kansas
11/21/2015*; 2:00 pm		UTSA	W 79–60	2–1	Moody Coliseum (1,002); Abilene, Texas
11/23/2015*; 7:00 pm		Southwest	W 91–39	3–1	Moody Coliseum (517); Abilene, Texas
11/27/2015*; 2:00 pm		Missouri Valley	W 96–35	4–1	Moody Coliseum (525); Abilene, Texas
12/02/2015*; 5:30 pm		at Texas Tech	L 65–71	4–2	United Supermarkets Arena (3,015); Lubbock, Texas
12/04/2015*; 8:00 pm		vs. Grand Canyon; Air Force Classic	W 76–71	5–2	Clune Arena (96); Colorado Springs, Colorado
12/05/2015*; 3:00 pm		vs. Eastern Michigan; Air Force Classic	W 83–59	6–2	Clune Arena; Colorado Springs, Colorado
12/18/2015*; 6:00 pm		at Eastern Washington	W 72–60	7–2	Reese Court (153); Cheney, Washington
12/20/2015*; 2:00 pm		at Idaho	W 71–59 ^{OT}	8–2	Cowan Spectrum (201); Moscow, Idaho
12/31/2015*; 2:00 pm		Schreiner	W 79–51	9–2	Moody Coliseum (1,031); Abilene, Texas
Southland Conference schedule
01/02/2016; 2:00 pm		at Central Arkansas	W 61–49	10–2 (1–0)	Farris Center (512); Conway, Arkansas
01/07/2016; 7:00 pm		Northwestern State	W 67–46	11–2 (2–0)	Moody Coliseum (1,107); Abilene, Texas
01/10/2016; 1:00 pm		at Nicholls State	W 71–68	12–2 (3–0)	Stopher Gym (487); Thibodaux, Louisiana
01/13/2016; 7:00 pm		McNeese State	W 79–62	13–2 (4–0)	Moody Coliseum (1,136); Abilene, Texas
01/16/2016; 4:00 pm		at Stephen F. Austin	W 85–70	14–2 (5–0)	William R. Johnson Coliseum (1,749); Nacogdoches, Texas
01/21/2016; 6:30 pm		at Sam Houston State	W 87–76	15–2 (6–0)	Bernard Johnson Coliseum (1,009); Huntsville TX
01/23/2016; 2:00 pm		at Incarnate Word	W 86–71	16–2 (7–0)	McDermott Center (524); San Antonio, Texas
01/27/2016; 7:00 pm		Houston Baptist	W 77–60	17–2 (8–0)	Moody Coliseum (1,227); Abilene, Texas
01/30/2016; 2:00 pm		Lamar	W 90–62	18–2 (9–0)	Moody Coliseum (1,306); Abilene, Texas
02/04/2016; 7:00 pm, ESPN3		at Lamar	L 54–63	18–3 (9–1)	Montagne Center (687); Beaumont, Texas
02/06/2016; 1:00 pm		at Southeastern Louisiana	W 88–72	19–3 (10–1)	University Center (581); Hammond, Louisiana
02/10/2016; 7:00 pm		Sam Houston State	W 67–55	20–3 (11–1)	Moody Coliseum (1,022); Abilene, Texas
02/17/2016; 7:00 pm		at Texas A&M–Corpus Christi	W 71–65	21–3 (12–1)	Dugan Wellness Center (457); Corpus Christi, Texas
02/21/2016; 3:30 pm, ESPN3		Southeastern Louisiana	W 72–70	22–3 (13–1)	Moody Coliseum (1,025); Abilene, Texas
02/24/2016; 7:00 pm		at Houston Baptist	W 76–65	23–3 (14–1)	Sharp Gymnasium (179); Houston, Texas
02/27/2016; 2:00 pm		New Orleans	W 76–55	24–3 (15–1)	Moody Coliseum (1,015); Abilene, Texas
03/02/2016; 7:00 pm		Incarnate Word	W 66–58	25–3 (16–1)	Moody Coliseum (1,231); Abilene, Texas
03/05/2016; 2:00 pm		Texas A&M–Corpus Christi	W 63–52	26–3 (17–1)	Moody Coliseum (1,336); Abilene, Texas
WNIT
03/17/2016*; 8:05 pm		at UTEP; First Round	L 62–66	26–4	Don Haskins Center (4,517); El Paso, Texas
*Non-conference game. ^{#}Rankings from AP Poll. (#) Tournament seedings in parentheses. All times are in Central Time.

== See also ==
- 2015–16 Abilene Christian Wildcats men's basketball team
