= New York City Museum School =

Public school in New York City

Coordinates: 40°44′33″N 74°00′09″W

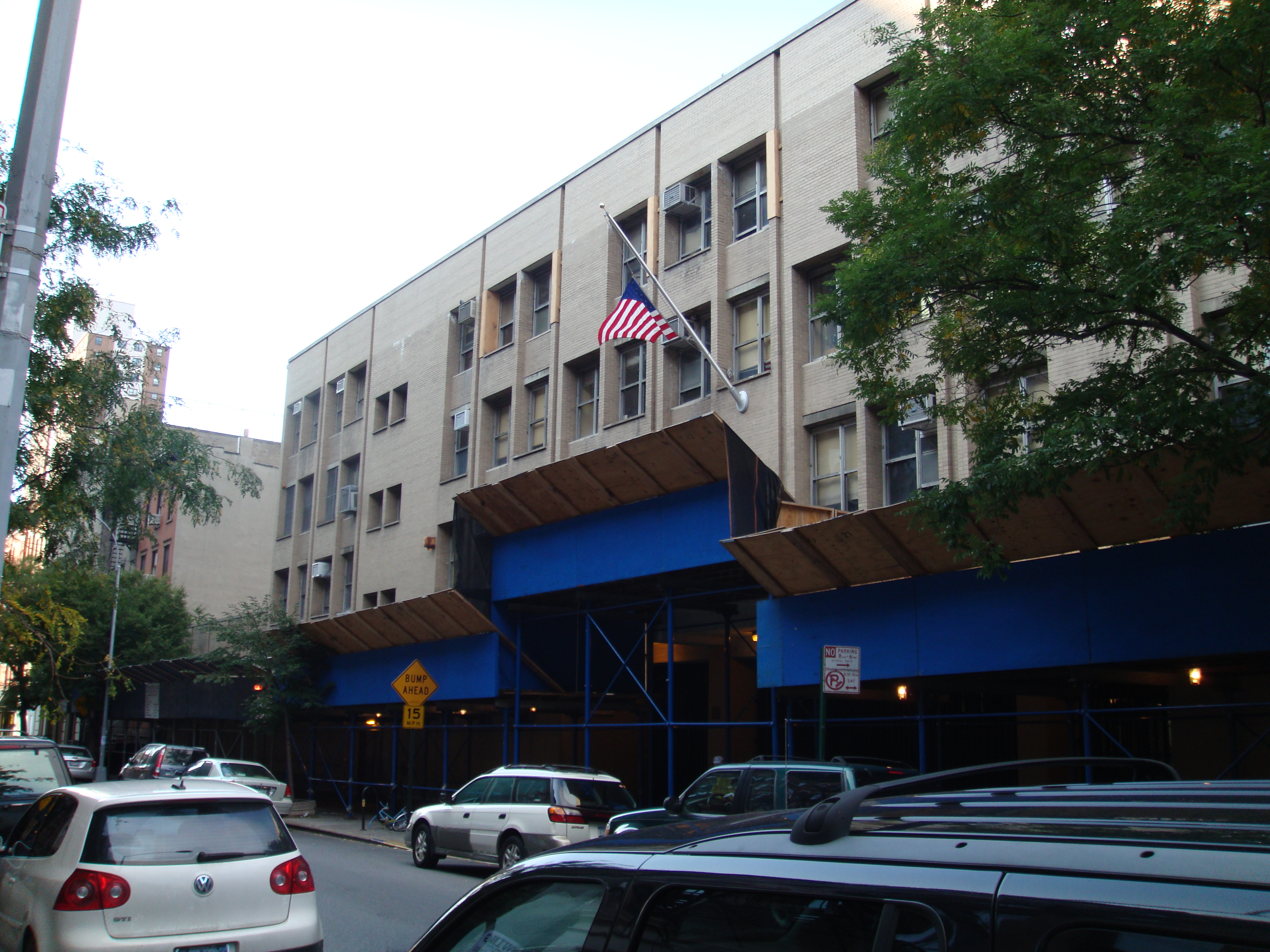
New York City Museum School

The New York City Museum School (NYCMS) is a public school for grades 9–12 on West 17th Street in Chelsea, Manhattan, New York City, United States. It shares a building with the New York City Lab School for Collaborative Studies.

The school's curriculum requires weekly visits to museums all over New York City, where an NYCMS teacher conducts class in conjunction with Museum staff, and it has been a model for similar programs in other cities. These visits supplement conventional classes held inside the school.

NYCMS provides education to a heterogeneous group of students from a diverse community.

The museum opened in September 1994 as a fully accredited school and was co-founded by Sonnet Takahisa, staff member at the Brooklyn Museum with whom the school partnered. The Children's Museum of Manhattan was also among its founding partners.
