= 2016 Women's National Invitation Tournament =

College basketball postseason tournament

- Season: 2015–16
- Teams: 64
- Finals site: DakotaDome, Vermillion, South Dakota
- Champions: South Dakota Coyotes (1st title)
- Runner-up: Florida Gulf Coast Eagles (1st title game)
- Semifinalists: Oregon Ducks (2nd semifinal); Michigan Wolverines (3rd semifinal)
- Winning coach: Amy Williams (1st title)
- MVP: Nicole Seekamp (South Dakota)
- Attendance: 7,415 (championship game)

The 2016 Women's National Invitation Tournament was a single-elimination tournament of 64 NCAA Division I teams that were not selected to participate in the 2016 Women's NCAA tournament. The annual tournament began on March 16 and ended on April 2, with the championship game televised on CBS Sports Network. All games were played on the campus sites of participating schools.

== Participants ==
The 2016 Postseason WNIT field will consist of 32 automatic invitations – one from each conference – and 32 (or more) at-large teams. The intention of the WNIT Selection Committee is to select the best available at-large teams in the nation. A team offered an automatic berth by the WNIT shall be the team that is the highest-finishing team in its conference's regular-season standings, and not selected for the NCAA Tournament. A team that fulfills these qualities, and accepts, will earn the WNIT automatic berth for its conference, regardless of overall record. The remaining berths in the WNIT are filled by the best teams available. Any team considered for an at-large berth must have an overall record of .500 or better. Should a conference's automatic qualifier team decline the WNIT bid, the conference forfeits its AQ spot and that berth goes into the at-large pool. NC State and Arkansas qualified as invitees from the ACC and SEC respectively but each declined to participate.

=== Automatic qualifiers ===
Conference	School
America East	Maine
American	Temple
Atlantic 10	Saint Louis
Atlantic Sun	Florida Gulf Coast
Big 12	TCU
Big East	Villanova
Big Sky	Montana State
Big South	Liberty
Big Ten	Minnesota
Big West	UC Riverside
Colonial	Drexel
C-USA	UTEP
Horizon League	Milwaukee
Ivy League	Harvard
MAAC	Quinnipiac
MAC	Ohio
MEAC	Bethune-Cookman
Missouri Valley	Northern Iowa
Mountain West	Fresno State
Northeast	Sacred Heart
Ohio Valley	UT Martin
Pac-12	Oregon
Patriot	Bucknell
Southern	Mercer
Southland	Abilene Christian
SWAC	Southern
Summit League	South Dakota
Sun Belt	Arkansas State
WCC	Saint Mary's
WAC	Texas–Rio Grande Valley

=== At-large bids ===
Conference	School
MAC	Akron
SEC	Alabama
MAC	Ball State
MAC	Central Michigan
C-USA	Charlotte
Big East	Creighton
Atlantic 10	Dayton
Missouri Valley	Drake
MAC	Eastern Michigan
CAA	Elon
Big East	Georgetown
ACC	Georgia Tech
West Coast	Gonzaga
CAA	Hofstra
Big Ten	Iowa
Summit	IUPUI
Sun Belt	Little Rock
Big West	Long Beach State
C-USA	Marshall
American	Memphis
Big Ten	Michigan
Big Ten	Nebraska
Big Ten	Northwestern
Big Ten	Rutgers
WCC	San Diego
WCC	Santa Clara
American	Tulane
Pac-12	Utah
Atlantic 10	VCU
ACC	Virginia
ACC	Virginia Tech
ACC	Wake Forest
C-USA	Western Kentucky
Horizon League	Wright State

== Bracket ==
All times are listed as Eastern Daylight Time (UTC-4).
* – Denotes overtime period.

Round 1
Gonzaga	88
UC-Riverside	54
Utah	95
Montana State	61
Oregon	84
Long Beach State	76
Fresno State	59
Santa Clara	53
Saint Mary's	73
Eastern Michigan	74
TCU	97
UT Rio Grande Valley	73
Arkansas State	68
Southern	45
UTEP	66
Abilene Christian	62

Round 2
Gonzaga	77
Utah	92
Oregon	84
Fresno State	59
Eastern Michigan	81
TCU	85
Arkansas State	68
UTEP	74

Round 3
Utah	63
Oregon	73
TCU	70
UTEP	79

Quarterfinals
Oregon	71
UTEP	67

Round 1
Minnesota	87
Milwaukee	80
South Dakota	74
Creighton	68
Drake	95
Sacred Heart	59
Nebraska	62
Northern Iowa	64
Iowa	72
Ball State	77
Saint Louis	70
Arkansas Little-Rock	69
Memphis	73
Tennessee-Martin	79
Western Kentucky	89
Dayton	72

Round 2
Minnesota	89
South Dakota	101
Drake	58
Northern Iowa	64
Ball State	57
St. Louis	59
Tennessee-Martin	57
Western Kentucky	64

Round 3
South Dakota	51
Northern Iowa	50
St. Louis	76
Western Kentucky	78*

Quarterfinals
South Dakota	68
Western Kentucky	54

Round 1
Northwestern	65
San Diego	69
Central Michigan	55
IUPUI	63
Michigan	81
Wright State	53
Akron	70
Bucknell	74
Quinnipiac	90
Maine	43
Drexel	66
Temple	74
Ohio	76
Marshall	68
Virginia Tech	68
Elon	59

Round 2
San Diego	59
IUPUI	48
Michigan	95
Bucknell	72
Quinnipiac	62
Temple	64
Ohio	64
Virginia Tech	57

Round 3
San Diego	51
Michigan	78
Temple	75
Ohio	61

Quarterfinals
Michigan	77
Temple	76

Round 1
Villanova	67
Liberty	51
Hofstra	75
Harvard	70
Rutgers	57
Georgetown	55
VCU	50
Virginia	52
Tulane	53
Alabama	52
Georgia Tech	73
Mercer	56
Charlotte	69
Wake Forest	72
Florida Gulf Coast	78
Bethune-Cookman	51

Round 2
Villanova	72
Hofstra	84
Rutgers	55
Virginia	71
Tulane	64
Georgia Tech	61
Wake Forest	48
Florida Gulf Coast	67

Round 3
Hofstra	65
Virginia	57
Tulane	61
Florida Gulf Coast	73

Quarterfinals
Hofstra	46
Florida Gulf Coast	61

=== Semifinals and championship game ===
WNIT Semifinals; March 30–31
Oregon	54
South Dakota	88
Michigan	62
Florida Gulf Coast	71

WNIT Championship Game; April 2, 2016; CBS Sports Network; Vermillion, South Dakota
South Dakota	71
Florida Gulf Coast	65

== All-tournament team ==
- Nicole Seekamp, South Dakota (MVP)
- Maite Cazorla, Oregon
- Madison Ristovski, Michigan
- Whitney Knight, Florida Gulf Coast
- Kaneisha Atwater, Florida Gulf Coast
- Tia Hemiller, South Dakota

== See also ==
- 2016 National Invitation Tournament
