= 2015–16 Minnesota Golden Gophers women's basketball team =

Intercollegiate basketball season

2015–16 Minnesota Golden Gophers women's basketball

WNIT, Second Round
- Conference: Big Ten Conference
- Record: 20–12 (11–7 B1G)
- Head coach: Marlene Stollings (2nd season)
- Assistant coaches: Nikita Lowry Dawkins; Gail Striegler; John Motherwell
- Home arena: Williams Arena

2015–16 Big Ten women's basketball standings
	Conf.				Overall
Team	W		L	PCT	W		L	PCT
No. 5 Maryland†	16	–	2	.889	31	–	4	.886
No. 9 Ohio State	15	–	3	.833	26	–	8	.765
No. 16 Michigan State	13	–	5	.722	25	–	9	.735
Indiana	12	–	6	.667	21	–	12	.636
Minnesota	11	–	7	.611	20	–	12	.625
Purdue	10	–	8	.556	20	–	12	.625
Michigan	9	–	9	.500	21	–	14	.600
Nebraska	9	–	9	.500	18	–	13	.581
Iowa	8	–	10	.444	19	–	14	.576
Rutgers	8	–	10	.444	19	–	15	.559
Penn State	6	–	12	.333	12	–	19	.387
Northwestern	4	–	14	.222	18	–	17	.514
Wisconsin	3	–	15	.167	7	–	22	.241
Illinois	2	–	16	.111	9	–	21	.300
† 2016 Big Ten tournament winner As of March 31, 2016; Rankings from AP poll

The 2015–16 Minnesota Golden Gophers women's basketball team represented the University of Minnesota in the 2015–16 college basketball season. Led by second year head coach Marlene Stollings for the Golden Gophers, members of the Big Ten Conference, played their home games at Williams Arena in Minneapolis, Minnesota. They finished the season 20–12, 11–7 in Big Ten play to finish in fifth place. They lost in the second round in the Big Ten women's tournament to Northwestern. They were invited to the Women's National Invitation Tournament where they defeated Milwaukee in the first round before losing to South Dakota in the second round.

== Roster ==
2015–16 Minnesota Golden Gophers women's basketball team
Players
Coaches

Pos.	#	Name	Height	Year	Previous school	Hometown
G	1	Rachel Banham	5 ft 9 in (1.75 m)	RS Sr	Lakeville North HS	Lakeville, MN
F	2	Danielle Garven	6 ft 1 in (1.85 m)	Fr	St. John Paul II Catholic	Scarborough, ON
G	3	Shayne Mullaney	5 ft 10 in (1.78 m)	Sr	Eden Prairie HS	Eden Prairie, MN
C	10	Jessie Edwards	6 ft 3 in (1.91 m)	So	Western Australia	Leeming, Australia
G	15	Allina Starr	5 ft 10 in (1.78 m)	So	DeLaSalle HS; Auburn	Minneapolis, MN
G	22	Joanna Hedstrom	6 ft 1 in (1.85 m)	Jr	Minnetonka HS	Minnetonka, MN
G	23	Kenisha Bell	5 ft 9 in (1.75 m)	So	Bloomington Kennedy HS; Marquette	Minneapolis, MN
G	24	Mikayla Bailey	5 ft 9 in (1.75 m)	Sr	Osseo HS	Maple Grove, MN
F	25	Kynadi Johnson	6 ft 1 in (1.85 m)	Jr	Garland HS; Butler CC	Garland, TX
C	32	Karley Barnes	6 ft 3 in (1.91 m)	Jr	Vincent HS; Tallahassee CC	Milwaukee, WI
G	33	Carlie Wagner	5 ft 10 in (1.78 m)	So	NRHEG HS	New Richland, MN
C	41	Annalese Lamke	6 ft 3 in (1.91 m)	Fr	Gale-Ettrick-Trempealeau HS	Milwaukee, WI
C	52	Josie Buckingham	6 ft 5 in (1.96 m)	So	New Richmond HS	New Richmond, OH

Head coach

Marlene Stollings (Ohio)

Assistant coach(es)

Nikita Lowry Dawkins (Ohio State)
Gail Striegler (Central Arkansas)
John Motherwell (Michigan)

Legend

- (C) Team captain
- (S) Suspended
- (I) Ineligible
- (W) Walk-on
- Injured
- Current redshirt

Roster

== Schedule and results ==
Date time, TV	Rank^{#}	Opponent^{#}	Result	Record	Site (attendance) city, state
Non conference regular season
November 13, 2015*; 5:30 pm		Wofford	W 98–54	1–0	Williams Arena (4,327); Minneapolis, MN
November 20, 2015*; 7:00 pm		Maine	W 91–64	2–0	Williams Arena (2,761); Minneapolis, MN
November 24, 2015*; 5:30 pm		at Kent State	W 85–73	3–0	MAC Center (594); Kent, OH
November 27, 2015*; 3:45 pm		vs. Stetson; San Juan Shootout	W 72–69	4–0	Mario Morales Coliseum; Guaynabo, PR
November 28, 2015*; 6:00 pm		vs. Auburn; San Juan Shootout	L 79–81 ^{OT}	4–1	Mario Morales Coliseum (110); Guaynabo, PR
December 3, 2015*; 6:00 pm, ESPN3		at No. 14 Duke; ACC–Big Ten Women's Challenge	L 64–84	4–2	Cameron Indoor Stadium (3,617); Durham, NC
December 6, 2015*; 7:00 pm		Towson	W 105–86	5–2	Williams Arena (2,271); Minneapolis, MN
December 12, 2015*; 2:00 pm		Memphis	W 70–60	6–2	Williams Arena (3,226); Minneapolis, MN
December 16, 2015*; 12:00 pm		New Mexico	L 53–72	6–3	Williams Arena (4,613); Minneapolis, MN
December 23, 2015*; 3:00 pm		North Dakota	W 57–47	7–3	Williams Arena (2,800); Minneapolis, MN
December 28, 2015*; 7:00 pm		NJIT	W 83–50	8–3	Williams Arena (2,772); Minneapolis, MN
Big Ten regular season
December 31, 2015; 12:00 pm		at Rutgers	L 55–66	8–4 (0–1)	Louis Brown Athletic Center (2,057); Piscataway, NJ
January 3, 2016; 2:00 pm		Penn State	W 98–85	9–4 (1–1)	Williams Arena (3,792); Minneapolis, MN
January 7, 2016; 8:00 pm, BTN		at Illinois	W 106–75	10–4 (2–1)	State Farm Center (1,263); Champaign, IL
January 10, 2016; 2:00 pm		Michigan	L 86–93	10–5 (2–2)	Williams Arena (3,243); Minneapolis, MN
January 14, 2016; 6:00 pm		at Purdue	L 72–84	10–6 (2–3)	Mackey Arena (5,788); West Lafayette, IN
January 17, 2016; 2:00 pm		Indiana	W 78–76	11–6 (3–3)	Williams Arena (4,337); Minneapolis, MN
January 20, 2016; 7:00 pm		Northwestern	W 95–92	12–6 (4–3)	Williams Arena (2,549); Minneapolis, MN
January 23, 2016; 11:00 am, BTN		at Wisconsin	W 84–77	13–6 (5–3)	Kohl Center (4,002); Madison, WI
January 26, 2016; 8:00 pm, BTN		Illinois	W 82–77	14–6 (6–3)	Williams Arena (2,618); Minneapolis, MN
January 31, 2016; 11:30 am, BTN		at Michigan	L 76–92	14–7 (6–4)	Crisler Center (2,778); Ann Arbor, MI
February 4, 2016; 7:00 pm		Rutgers	W 85–72	15–7 (7–4)	Williams Arena (2,754); Minneapolis, MN
February 7, 2016; 2:00 pm, BTN		at Northwestern	W 116–112 ^{2OT}	16–7 (8–4)	Welsh-Ryan Arena (1,223); Evanston, IL
February 11, 2016; 7:00 pm		Nebraska	W 110–73	17–7 (9–4)	Williams Arena (3,945); Minneapolis, MN
February 15, 2016; 7:00 pm, BTN		Iowa	W 78–76	18–7 (10–4)	Williams Arena (6,167); Minneapolis, MN
February 18, 2016; 6:00 pm		at Indiana	L 79–93	18–8 (10–5)	Assembly Hall (2,530); Bloomington, IN
February 21, 2016; 12:00 pm, BTN		at No. 25 Michigan State	L 106–114	18–9 (10–6)	Breslin Center (9,436); East Lansing, MI
February 24, 2016; 7:00 pm		No. 5 Ohio State	W 90–88 ^{OT}	19–9 (11–6)	Williams Arena (6,434); Minneapolis, MN
February 28, 2016; 4:00 pm, ESPN2		at No. 6 Maryland	L 77–110	19–10 (11–7)	Xfinity Center (11,428); College Park, MD
Big Ten Women's Tournament
March 3, 2016; 1:30 pm, BTN		vs. Northwestern; Second Round	L 74–84	19–11	Bankers Life Fieldhouse; Indianapolis, IN
WNIT
March 16, 2016*; 7:00 pm		Milwaukee; First Round	W 87–80	20–11	Williams Arena (1,663); Minneapolis, MN
March 20, 2016*; 2:00 pm		South Dakota; Second Round	L 89–101	20–12	Williams Arena (3,224); Minneapolis, MN
*Non-conference game. ^{#}Rankings from AP Poll. (#) Tournament seedings in parentheses. All times are in Central Time.

== Rankings ==
Ranking movement Legend: ██ Increase in ranking. ██ Decrease in ranking. NR = Not ranked. RV = Received votes.
Poll	Pre	Wk 2	Wk 3	Wk 4	Wk 5	Wk 6	Wk 7	Wk 8	Wk 9	Wk 10	Wk 11	Wk 12	Wk 13	Wk 14	Wk 15	Wk 16	Wk 17	Wk 18	Wk 19	Final
AP	NR	NR	NR	NR	NR	NR	NR	NR	NR	NR	NR	NR	NR	RV	RV	NR	NR	NR	NR	N/A
Coaches	NR	NR	NR	NR	NR	NR	NR	NR	NR	NR	NR	NR	NR	NR	NR	NR	RV	NR	NR	NR

== See also ==
2015–16 Minnesota Golden Gophers men's basketball team
