= 2015–16 Purdue Boilermakers women's basketball team =

Intercollegiate basketball season

2015–16 Purdue Boilermakers women's basketball

NCAA Women's Tournament, first round
- Conference: Big Ten Conference
- Record: 20–12 (10–8 B1G)
- Head coach: Sharon Versyp (10th season)
- Assistant coaches: Nadine Morgan; Kelly Komara; Lindsay Wisdom-Hylton
- Home arena: Mackey Arena

2015–16 Big Ten women's basketball standings
| | Conf. | | | | Overall |
| Team | W | | L | PCT | W | | L | PCT |
|---|---|---|---|---|---|---|---|---|
| No. 5 Maryland† | 16 | – | 2 | .889 | 31 | – | 4 | .886 |
| No. 9 Ohio State | 15 | – | 3 | .833 | 26 | – | 8 | .765 |
| No. 16 Michigan State | 13 | – | 5 | .722 | 25 | – | 9 | .735 |
| Indiana | 12 | – | 6 | .667 | 21 | – | 12 | .636 |
| Minnesota | 11 | – | 7 | .611 | 20 | – | 12 | .625 |
| Purdue | 10 | – | 8 | .556 | 20 | – | 12 | .625 |
| Michigan | 9 | – | 9 | .500 | 21 | – | 14 | .600 |
| Nebraska | 9 | – | 9 | .500 | 18 | – | 13 | .581 |
| Iowa | 8 | – | 10 | .444 | 19 | – | 14 | .576 |
| Rutgers | 8 | – | 10 | .444 | 19 | – | 15 | .559 |
| Penn State | 6 | – | 12 | .333 | 12 | – | 19 | .387 |
| Northwestern | 4 | – | 14 | .222 | 18 | – | 17 | .514 |
| Wisconsin | 3 | – | 15 | .167 | 7 | – | 22 | .241 |
| Illinois | 2 | – | 16 | .111 | 9 | – | 21 | .300 |
† 2016 Big Ten tournament winner As of March 31, 2016; Rankings from AP poll

The 2015–16 Purdue Boilermakers women's basketball team represented Purdue University during the 2015–16 NCAA Division I women's basketball season. The Boilermakers, led by tenth-year head coach Sharon Versyp, played their home games at Mackey Arena and were members of the Big Ten Conference. They finished the season 20–12, 10–8 in Big Ten play to finish in sixth place. They advanced to the quarterfinals of the Big Ten women's tournament, where they lost to Michigan State. They received an at-large bid to the NCAA women's tournament, where they lost to Oklahoma in the first round.

== Roster ==
2015–16 Purdue Boilermakers women's basketball team
Players
Coaches

| Pos. | # | Name | Height | Year | Previous school | Hometown |
|---|---|---|---|---|---|---|
| G | 1 | Ashley Morrissette | 5 ft 9 in (1.75 m) | Jr | Twinsburg | Twinsburg, OH |
| G | 2 | Abby Abel | 5 ft 5 in (1.65 m) | Fr | Carmel | Carmel, IN |
| G | 3 | Tiara Murphy | 5 ft 7 in (1.7 m) | Fr | Washington | South Bend, IN |
| G | 4 | Torrie Thornton | 6 ft 0 in (1.83 m) | RS Sr | Carmel | Carmel, IN |
| G | 5 | Justine Hall | 5 ft 10 in (1.78 m) | So | Regis Jesuit | Denver, CO |
| G | 10 | Hayden Hamby | 5 ft 7 in (1.7 m) | Sr | West Morgan | Trinity, AL |
| C | 12 | Nora Kiesler | 6 ft 6 in (1.98 m) | Fr | Assumption | Louisville, KY |
| G | 13 | Bridget Perry | 6 ft 2 in (1.88 m) | Jr | Roncalli | Mooresville, IN |
| F | 20 | Dominique McBryde | 6 ft 2 in (1.88 m) | Fr | Bedford North Lawrence | Bedford, IN |
| F | 21 | Erica Moore | 6 ft 2 in (1.88 m) | So | Mount Vernon | Fortville, IN |
| C | 22 | Bree Horrocks | 6 ft 5 in (1.96 m) | So | Buford | Buford, GA |
| G | 24 | Andreona Keys | 5 ft 10 in (1.78 m) | So | Roswell | Atlanta, GA |
| G | 25 | April Wilson | 5 ft 7 in (1.7 m) | Jr | Manual | Louisville, KY |

Head coach

Sharon Versyp (Purdue)

Assistant coach(es)

Nadine Morgan (James Madison)
Kelly Komara (Purdue)
Lindsay Wisdom-Hylton (Purdue)

Legend

- (C) Team captain
- (S) Suspended
- (I) Ineligible
- (W) Walk-on
- Injured
- Current redshirt

Roster

== Schedule ==
| Date time, TV | Rank^{#} | Opponent^{#} | Result | Record | Site (attendance) city, state |
Exhibition
| 11/08/2015*; 12:00 pm | | Marian | W 78–37 | | Mackey Arena (6,034); West Lafayette, IN |
Non-conference regular season
| 11/16/2015*; 7:00 pm | | Jacksonville State | W 67–48 | 1–0 | Mackey Arena (5,594); West Lafayette, IN |
| 11/19/2015*; 7:00 pm | | UIC | W 62–51 | 2–0 | Mackey Arena (5,572); West Lafayette, IN |
| 11/21/2015*; 3:00 pm, ESPN3 | | at North Florida | W 70–47 | 3–0 | UNF Arena (534); Jacksonville, FL |
| 11/27/2015*; 7:30 pm, CST | | vs. LSU; Gulf Coast Showcase quarterfinals | W 69–52 | 4–0 | Germain Arena (1,257); Estero, FL |
| 11/28/2015*; 7:30 pm | | vs. No. 22 Louisville; Gulf Coast Showcase semifinals | W 62–60 | 5–0 | Germain Arena (1,407); Estero, FL |
| 11/29/2015*; 7:30 pm | | vs. No. 13 Stanford; Gulf Coast Showcase championship | L 65–71 ^{OT} | 5–1 | Germain Arena; Estero, FL |
| 12/03/2015*; 6:00 pm, BTN | | Boston College; ACC–Big Ten Women's Challenge | L 56–58 | 5–2 | Mackey Arena (5,805); West Lafayette, IN |
| 12/06/2015*; 2:00 pm | | Dayton | W 61–58 | 6–2 | Mackey Arena (5,830); West Lafayette, IN |
| 12/10/2015*; 7:00 pm | | Incarnate Word | W 95–27 | 7–2 | Mackey Arena (5,480); West Lafayette, IN |
| 12/13/2015*; 2:00 pm | | Ball State | W 73–63 | 8–2 | Mackey Arena (5,958); West Lafayette, IN |
| 12/21/2015*; 7:00 pm | | Maine | W 56–33 | 9–2 | Mackey Arena (5,803); West Lafayette, IN |
Big Ten regular season
| 12/31/2015; 1:00 pm | | at Michigan | W 65–63 | 10–2 (1–0) | Crisler Center (3,159); Ann Arbor, MI |
| 01/03/2016; 2:00 pm | | Illinois | W 69–65 | 11–2 (2–0) | Mackey Arena (6,374); West Lafayette, IN |
| 01/07/2016; 8:00 pm | | at No. 16 Northwestern | W 85–71 | 12–2 (3–0) | Welsh-Ryan Arena (714); Evanston, IL |
| 01/10/2016; 2:00 pm | | Indiana; Rivalry/Crimson and Gold Cup | W 63–53 | 13–2 (4–0) | Mackey Arena (8,519); West Lafayette, IN |
| 01/14/2016; 7:00 pm | | Minnesota | W 84–72 | 14–2 (5–0) | Mackey Arena (5,788); West Lafayette, IN |
| 01/17/2016; 2:00 pm, BTN | | at No. 5 Ohio State | L 70–90 | 14–3 (5–1) | Value City Arena (7,418); Columbus, OH |
| 01/20/2016; 7:00 pm | | Nebraska | L 61–62 | 14–4 (5–2) | Mackey Arena (6,041); West Lafayette, IN |
| 01/24/2016; 3:00 pm, BTN | | Iowa | W 90–73 | 15–4 (6–2) | Mackey Arena (7,865); West Lafayette, IN |
| 01/27/2016; 7:00 pm | | at No. 21 Michigan State | L 56–68 | 15–5 (6–3) | Breslin Center (5,272); East Lansing, MI |
| 01/30/2016; 2:00 pm | | at Penn State | W 88–78 ^{2OT} | 16–5 (7–3) | Bryce Jordan Center (3,769); University Park, PA |
| 02/02/2016; 6:00 pm, BTN | | No. 5 Maryland | L 67–87 | 16–6 (7–4) | Mackey Arena (6,024); West Lafayette, IN |
| 02/08/2016; 7:00 pm | | at Wisconsin | L 57–64 | 16–7 (7–5) | Kohl Center (3,149); Madison, WI |
| 02/11/2016; 7:00 pm | | at No. 5 Maryland | L 59–73 | 16–8 (7–6) | Xfinity Center (3,646); College Park, MD |
| 02/14/2016; 2:00 pm | | Michigan | L 61–68 | 16–9 (7–7) | Mackey Arena (6,427); West Lafayette, IN |
| 02/18/2016; 8:00 pm | | at Iowa | L 55–63 | 16–10 (7–8) | Carver–Hawkeye Arena (3,659); Iowa City, IA |
| 02/21/2016; 3:00 pm, BTN | | at Nebraska | W 68–50 | 17–10 (8–8) | Pinnacle Bank Arena (5,671); Lincoln, NE |
| 02/25/2016; 6:30 pm, BTN | | Rutgers | W 75–68 ^{OT} | 18–10 (9–8) | Mackey Arena (5,821); West Lafayette, IN |
| 02/28/2016; 2:00 pm | | Wisconsin | W 68–48 | 19–10 (10–8) | Mackey Arena (7,146); West Lafayette, IN |
Big Ten Women's Tournament
| 03/03/2016; 9:00 pm, BTN | | vs. Penn State; Second Round | W 70–59 | 20–10 | Bankers Life Fieldhouse; Indianapolis, IN |
| 03/04/2016; 9:00 pm, BTN | | vs. No. 19 Michigan State; Quarterfinals | L 64–65 | 20–11 | Bankers Life Fieldhouse; Indianapolis, IN |
NCAA Women's Tournament
| 03/19/2016*; 1:30 pm, ESPN2 | (11 L) | vs. (6 L) No. 24 Oklahoma; First Round | L 45–61 | 20–12 | Memorial Coliseum; Lexington, KY |
*Non-conference game. ^{#}Rankings from AP Poll. (#) Tournament seedings in parentheses. L=Lexington Region. All times are in Eastern Time.

== Rankings ==
Regular season polls
| Poll | Pre- season | Week 2 | Week 3 | Week 4 | Week 5 | Week 6 | Week 7 | Week 8 | Week 9 | Week 10 | Week 11 | Week 12 | Week 13 | Week 14 | Week 15 | Week 16 | Week 17 | Week 18 | Week 19 | Final |
|---|---|---|---|---|---|---|---|---|---|---|---|---|---|---|---|---|---|---|---|---|
| AP | NR | NR | NR | RV | RV | RV | NR | NR | RV | RV | RV | RV | RV | RV | NR | NR | NR | NR | NR | N/A |
| Coaches | NR | NR | NR | RV | NR | NR | NR | NR | NR | NR | NR | NR | NR | NR | NR | NR | NR | NR | NR | NR |

Legend
| | Increase in ranking |
| | Decrease in ranking |
| | Not ranked previous week |
| (RV) | Received votes |

== See also ==
- 2015–16 Purdue Boilermakers men's basketball team
