= 2015–16 Rutgers Scarlet Knights women's basketball team =

Intercollegiate basketball season

2015–16 Rutgers Scarlet Knights women's basketball

Paradise Jam Island Division Champions

WNIT, Second Round
- Conference: Big Ten Conference
- Record: 19–15 (8–10 Big Ten)
- Head coach: C. Vivian Stringer (21st season)
- Assistant coaches: Kelley Gibson; Ervin Monier; Tim Eatman
- Home arena: Louis Brown Athletic Center

2015–16 Big Ten women's basketball standings
	Conf.				Overall
Team	W		L	PCT	W		L	PCT
No. 5 Maryland†	16	–	2	.889	31	–	4	.886
No. 9 Ohio State	15	–	3	.833	26	–	8	.765
No. 16 Michigan State	13	–	5	.722	25	–	9	.735
Indiana	12	–	6	.667	21	–	12	.636
Minnesota	11	–	7	.611	20	–	12	.625
Purdue	10	–	8	.556	20	–	12	.625
Michigan	9	–	9	.500	21	–	14	.600
Nebraska	9	–	9	.500	18	–	13	.581
Iowa	8	–	10	.444	19	–	14	.576
Rutgers	8	–	10	.444	19	–	15	.559
Penn State	6	–	12	.333	12	–	19	.387
Northwestern	4	–	14	.222	18	–	17	.514
Wisconsin	3	–	15	.167	7	–	22	.241
Illinois	2	–	16	.111	9	–	21	.300
† 2016 Big Ten tournament winner As of March 31, 2016; Rankings from AP poll

The 2015–16 Rutgers Scarlet Knights women's basketball team represented Rutgers University during the 2015–16 NCAA Division I women's basketball season. The Scarlet Knights, led by twenty-first year head coach C. Vivian Stringer, played their home games at the Louis Brown Athletic Center, better known as The RAC, as second year members of the Big Ten Conference. They finished the season 19–15, 8–10 in Big Ten play to finish in a tie for ninth place. They advanced to the quarterfinals of the Big Ten women's tournament, where they lost to Ohio State. They were invited to the Women's National Invitation Tournament, where they defeated Georgetown in the first round before losing to Virginia in the second round.

== Roster ==
2015–16 Rutgers Scarlet Knights women's basketball team
Players
Coaches

Pos.	#	Name	Height	Year	Previous school	Hometown
C	1	Rachel Hollivay	6 ft 4 in (1.93 m)	Sr	Heritage Academy	Columbus, MS
G/F	2	Kahleah Copper	6 ft 1 in (1.85 m)	Sr	Prep Charter	Philadelphia, PA
G	3	Tyler Scaife	5 ft 9 in (1.75 m)	Jr	Hall	Little Rock, AR
G	4	Briyona Canty	5 ft 9 in (1.75 m)	RS Sr	Trenton Catholic	Willingboro, NJ
G	5	Shrita Parker	5 ft 7 in (1.7 m)	So	Ocean Lakes	Virginia Beach, VA
G/F	11	Ashli Jeune	6 ft 1 in (1.85 m)	RS Fr	Life Center Academy	Westampton, NJ
G	12	Khadaizha Sanders	5 ft 7 in (1.7 m)	Fr	Bishop McNamara	Virginia Beach, IL
G	21	Ashli Jeune	5 ft 10 in (1.78 m)	Fr	Life Center Academy	Westampton, NJ
F	22	Alexis Burke	5 ft 11 in (1.8 m)	RS Sr	Bainbridge/Illinois	Bainbridge, GA
F/C	32	Desiree Keeling	6 ft 2 in (1.88 m)	Fr	William Fleming	Roanoke, VA
G	33	Alex Alfano	5 ft 8 in (1.73 m)	So	Red Bank Catholic	Atlantic Highlands, NJ
F/C	40	Victoria Harris	6 ft 3 in (1.91 m)	Fr	Parkview	Snellville, GA
C	43	Ariel Butts	6 ft 3 in (1.91 m)	Sr	Carver	Columbus, GA

Head coach

- C. Vivian Stringer (Slippery Rock)

Assistant coach(es)

- Kelley Gibson (Maryland)
- Ervin Monier (St. Mary's (TX))
- Tim Eatman (Talladega)

Legend

- (C) Team captain
- (S) Suspended
- (I) Ineligible
- (W) Walk-on
- Injured
- Current redshirt

Roster

== Schedule ==
Date time, TV	Rank^{#}	Opponent^{#}	Result	Record	Site (attendance) city, state
Non-conference regular season
11/13/2015*; 5:00 pm		at Saint Joseph's	W 78–65	1–0	Hagan Arena; Philadelphia, PA
11/16/2015*; 7:00 pm, FS2		at Seton Hall	L 49–77	1–1	Walsh Gymnasium (1,628); South Orange, NJ
11/19/2015*; 7:00 pm		St. John's	L 62–69	1–2	Louis Brown Athletic Center (2,226); Piscataway, NJ
11/22/2015*; 2:00 pm		Temple	W 61–51	2–2	Louis Brown Athletic Center (1,725); Piscataway, NJ
11/26/2015*; 3:15 pm		vs. Tulane; Paradise Jam tournament Island Division	W 75–51	3–2	Sports and Fitness Center (488); Saint Thomas, USVI
11/27/2015*; 3:15 pm		vs. Virginia; Paradise Jam Tournament Island Division	W 60–48	4–2	Sports and Fitness Center; Saint Thomas, USVI
11/28/2015*; 3:15 pm		vs. Green Bay; Paradise Jam Tournament Island Division	W 54–43	5–2	Sports and Fitness Center; Saint Thomas, USVI
12/03/2015*; 7:00 pm, ESPN3		at No. 13 Florida State; ACC–Big Ten Women's Challenge	L 43–65	5–3	Donald L. Tucker Civic Center (2,699); Tallahassee, FL
12/06/2015*; 2:00 pm		Arkansas	W 60–40	6–3	Louis Brown Athletic Center (1,810); Piscataway, NJ
12/09/2015*; 7:00 pm		Iona	W 58–33	7–3	Louis Brown Athletic Center (1,599); Piscataway, NJ
12/13/2015*; 4:00 pm		Savannah State	W 65–26	8–3	Louis Brown Athletic Center (1,645); Piscataway, NJ
12/19/2015*; 2:00 pm, BTN		LSU	W 69–57	9–3	Louis Brown Athletic Center (2,254); Piscataway, NJ
Big Ten regular season
12/31/2015; 1:00 pm		Minnesota	W 66–55	10–3 (1–0)	Louis Brown Athletic Center (2,057); Piscataway, NJ
01/04/2016; 8:00 pm, BTN		at Iowa	L 65–69	10–4 (1–1)	Carver–Hawkeye Arena (4,959); Iowa City, IA
01/07/2016; 7:00 pm		Wisconsin	W 61–41	11–4 (2–1)	Louis Brown Athletic Center (1,873); Piscataway, NJ
01/10/2016; 2:00 pm		at No. 5 Ohio State	L 78–90	11–5 (2–2)	Value City Arena (6,081); Columbus, OH
01/13/2016; 7:00 pm		Illinois	W 67–54	12–5 (3–2)	Louis Brown Athletic Center (1,829); Piscataway, NJ
01/16/2016; 6:30 pm, BTN		at Nebraska	L 54–65	12–6 (3–3)	Pinnacle Bank Arena (5,622); Lincoln, NE
01/19/2016; 6:00 pm, BTN		at No. 21 Michigan State	L 48–59	12–7 (3–4)	Breslin Center (4,911); East Lansing, MI
01/24/2016; 3:00 pm		No. 7 Ohio State	L 58–67	12–8 (3–5)	Louis Brown Athletic Center (1,510); Piscataway, NJ
01/27/2016; 7:00 pm		at Indiana	L 48–64	12–9 (3–6)	Assembly Hall (2,496); Bloomington, IN
01/30/2016; 2:00 pm		Nebraska	W 66–56	13–9 (4–6)	Louis Brown Athletic Center (2,815); Piscataway, NJ
02/04/2016; 8:00 pm		at Minnesota	L 72–85	13–10 (4–7)	Williams Arena (2,754); Minneapolis, MN
02/07/2016; 2:00 pm		at Penn State	W 74–62	14–10 (5–7)	Bryce Jordan Center (3,677); University Park, PA
02/10/2016; 7:00 pm		Northwestern	W 61–59	15–10 (6–7)	Louis Brown Athletic Center (3,177); Piscataway, NJ
02/13/2016; 6:00 pm, BTN		at Illinois	W 63–56	16–10 (7–7)	State Farm Center (2,450); Champaign, IL
02/18/2016; 7:00 pm		No. 25 Michigan State	L 67–70	16–11 (7–8)	Louis Brown Athletic Center (2,156); Piscataway, NJ
02/21/2016; 3:00 pm, ESPN2		No. 6 Maryland	L 59–73	16–12 (7–9)	Louis Brown Athletic Center (3,755); Piscataway, NJ
02/25/2016; 6:30 pm, BTN		at Purdue	L 68–75 ^{OT}	16–13 (7–10)	Mackey Arena (5,821); West Lafayette, IN
02/28/2016; 2:00 pm, BTN		Michigan	W 72–50	17–13 (8–10)	Louis Brown Athletic Center (3,505); Piscataway, NJ
Big Ten Women's tournament
03/03/2016; 6:30 pm, BTN		vs. Nebraska; Second Round	W 66–63	18–13	Bankers Life Fieldhouse; Indianapolis, IN
03/04/2016; 6:30 pm, BTN		vs. No. 9 Ohio State; Quarterfinals	L 58–73	18–14	Bankers Life Fieldhouse; Indianapolis, IN
WNIT
03/17/2016*; 7:00 pm		Georgetown; First Round	W 57–55	19–14	Louis Brown Athletic Center (453); Piscataway, NJ
03/20/2016*; 2:00 pm		Virginia; Second Round	L 55–71	19–15	Louis Brown Athletic Center (597); Piscataway, NJ
*Non-conference game. ^{#}Rankings from AP Poll. (#) Tournament seedings in parentheses. All times are in Eastern Time.

== Rankings ==
Regular season polls
Poll	Pre- Season	Week 2	Week 3	Week 4	Week 5	Week 6	Week 7	Week 8	Week 9	Week 10	Week 11	Week 12	Week 13	Week 14	Week 15	Week 16	Week 17	Week 18	Week 19	Final
AP	RV	RV	NR	NR	NR	NR	NR	NR	RV	NR	NR	NR	NR	NR	NR	NR	NR	NR	NR	N/A
Coaches	RV	RV	NR	NR	NR	NR	NR	NR	NR	NR	NR	NR	NR	NR	NR	NR	NR	NR	NR	NR

Legend
	Increase in ranking
	Decrease in ranking
	Not ranked previous week
(RV)	Received Votes

== See also ==
2015–16 Rutgers Scarlet Knights men's basketball team
