= 2015–16 Princeton Tigers women's basketball team =

Intercollegiate basketball season

2015–16 Princeton Tigers women's basketball

DoubleTree LA Thanksgiving Classic Champions

NCAA Women's Tournament, first round
- Conference: Ivy League
- Record: 23–6 (12–2 Ivy)
- Head coach: Courtney Banghart (9th season)
- Assistant coaches: Milena Flores; Chessie Jackson; Megan Griffith
- Home arena: Jadwin Gymnasium

2015–16 Ivy League women's basketball standings
	Conf.				Overall
Team	W		L	PCT	W		L	PCT
Penn†	13	–	1	.929	24	–	5	.828
Princeton	12	–	2	.857	23	–	6	.793
Harvard	9	–	5	.643	14	–	14	.500
Dartmouth	7	–	7	.500	12	–	18	.400
Cornell	6	–	8	.429	14	–	14	.500
Yale	5	–	9	.357	14	–	17	.452
Brown	3	–	11	.214	15	–	13	.536
Columbia	1	–	13	.071	12	–	17	.414
† Ivy League winner As of March 19, 2016; Rankings from AP Poll

The 2015–16 Princeton Tigers women's basketball team represented Princeton University during the 2015–16 NCAA Division I women's basketball season. The Tigers, led by ninth-year head coach Courtney Banghart, played their home games at Jadwin Gymnasium as members of the Ivy League.

During the DoubleTree LA Thanksgiving Classic championship game on November 28, senior guard Michelle Miller became the 23rd Princeton women's basketball player to surpass the 1,000-point mark. In the February 7 game against Harvard, senior forward and team co-captain Alex Wheatley scored her 1,000th career point.

Princeton finished the regular season with a 23–5 overall record and 12–2 in the Ivy League. Their only two conference losses came against Pennsylvania, who won the season-ending championship game. The Tigers were an at-large selection to the NCAA tournament, becoming the first-ever Ivy League team to earn an at-large bid in either the men's or women's NCAA Tournament. However, they lost in the first round to West Virginia.

== Previous season ==
The Tigers finished the 2014–15 season at 31–1, 14–0 to win the Ivy League regular season title and earn an automatic trip to the 2015 NCAA Division I women's basketball tournament, where they lost to Maryland in the second round. The Tigers' No. 13 ranking in both the Associated Press Top-25 and USA Today Coaches polls were the highest in conference history. Princeton's No. 8 seed was the best an Ivy program has ever earned, and the Tigers' first round win over Green Bay was just the second NCAA victory for an Ivy team, joining No. 16 Harvard's upset over No. 1 Stanford in 1998.

== Roster ==
2015–16 Princeton Tigers women's basketball team
Players
Coaches

Pos.	#	Name	Height	Year	Hometown
G	14	Amanda Berntsen	5 ft 9 in (1.75 m)	Sr	Chatham, New Jersey
G	2	Taylor Brown	5 ft 8 in (1.73 m)	Jr	Woodstock, Georgia
G/F	5	Caroline Davis	6 ft 0 in (1.83 m)	Fr	Newark, Delaware
G	24	Kenya Holland	5 ft 8 in (1.73 m)	So	Stafford, Virginia
G	23	Qalea Ismail	6 ft 1 in (1.85 m)	Fr	Bel Air, Maryland
G/F	20	Sydney Jordan	6 ft 0 in (1.83 m)	Fr	Manassas, Virginia
G	34	Michelle Miller	5 ft 10 in (1.78 m)	Sr	Pasadena, California
G	0	Claudia Muhammad	5 ft 8 in (1.73 m)	Fr	Charlotte, North Carolina
G	10	Jordan Reid	5 ft 7 in (1.7 m)	Fr	DeWitt, Michigan
F	44	Jackie Reyneke	6 ft 4 in (1.93 m)	Jr	Saddle River, New Jersey
F	45	Leslie Robinson	6 ft 0 in (1.83 m)	So	Corvallis, Oregon
G	25	Gabrielle Rush	5 ft 10 in (1.78 m)	Fr	Hinsdale, Illinois
G	13	Vanessa Smith	6 ft 1 in (1.85 m)	Jr	Twinsburg, Ohio
F	15	Annie Tarakchian (C)	6 ft 0 in (1.83 m)	Sr	West Hills, California
G	32	Tia Weledji	5 ft 10 in (1.78 m)	So	Overland Park, Kansas
F	21	Alex Wheatley (C)	6 ft 2 in (1.88 m)	Sr	Holland, Pennsylvania
F	22	Taylor Williams (C)	6 ft 3 in (1.91 m)	Sr	Warren, Ohio

Head coach

- Courtney Banghart (Dartmouth)

Assistant coach(es)

- Milena Flores (Stanford)
- Chessie Jackson (Williams)
- Megan Griffith (Columbia)

Legend

- (C) Team captain
- (S) Suspended
- (I) Ineligible
- (W) Walk-on
- Injured
- Current redshirt

Roster
Last update: October 30, 2015

== Schedule ==
Date time, TV	Rank^{#}	Opponent^{#}	Result	Record	Site (attendance) city, state
Regular season
Nov 13, 2015*; 7:00 pm		American	W 72–34	1–0	Jadwin Gymnasium (864); Princeton, NJ
Nov 15, 2015*; 2:00 pm		Duquesne	W 94–66	2–0	Jadwin Gymnasium (578); Princeton, NJ
Nov 19, 2015*; 7:00 pm, FS2		at Seton Hall	L 64–71	2–1	Walsh Gymnasium (1,130); South Orange, NJ
Nov 24, 2015*; 7:00 pm		at Rider	W 78–59	3–1	Alumni Gymnasium (478); Lawrenceville, NJ
Nov 27, 2015*; 10:00 am		vs. UC Irvine; DoubleTree LA Thanksgiving Classic semifinals	W 83–42	4–1	Gersten Pavilion (471); Los Angeles, CA
Nov 28, 2015*; 6:30 pm		vs. Seattle; DoubleTree LA Thanksgiving Classic championship	W 85–48	5–1	Gersten Pavilion (367); Los Angeles, CA
Dec 6, 2015*; 4:00 pm, ESPN2		Michigan	W 74–57	6–1	Jadwin Gymnasium (1,851); Princeton, NJ
Dec 9, 2015*; 7:00 pm		Monmouth	W 81–70	7–1	Jadwin Gymnasium (468); Princeton, NJ
Dec 12, 2015*; 3:00 pm		Pittsburgh	W 61–47	8–1	Jadwin Gymnasium (1,002); Princeton, NJ
Dec 14, 2015*; 7:00 pm		Fordham	W 55–44	9–1	Jadwin Gymnasium (559); Princeton, NJ
Dec 18, 2015*; 7:00 pm		at No. 10 Ohio State	L 70–90	9–2	Value City Arena (4,639); Columbus, OH
Dec 20, 2015*; 2:00 pm		at Dayton	L 81–85	9–3	UD Arena (2,385); Dayton, OH
Dec 29, 2015*; 7:00 pm		at Marist	W 77–44	10–3	McCann Arena (1,358); Poughkeepsie, NY
Jan 3, 2016*; 2:00 pm		Hampton	W 79–55	11–3	Jadwin Gymnasium (775); Princeton, NJ
Ivy League regular season
Jan 9, 2016; 1:00 pm		at Penn	L 48–50	11–4 (0–1)	Palestra; Philadelphia, PA
Jan 29, 2016; 7:00 pm		Brown	W 72–53	12–4 (1–1)	Jadwin Gymnasium (1,819); Princeton, NJ
Jan 30, 2016; 6:00 pm		Yale	W 65–50	13–4 (2–1)	Jadwin Gymnasium (2,109); Princeton, NJ
Feb 5, 2016; 7:00 pm		at Dartmouth	W 85–48	14–4 (3–1)	Leede Arena (719); Hanover, NH
Feb 7, 2016; 12:00 pm, ASN		at Harvard	W 92–83 ^{OT}	15–4 (4–1)	Lavietes Pavilion (661); Cambridge, MA
Feb 12, 2016; 7:00 pm		Cornell	W 71–51	16–4 (5–1)	Jadwin Gymnasium (933); Princeton, NJ
Feb 13, 2016; 6:00 pm		Columbia	W 86–54	17–4 (6–1)	Jadwin Gymnasium (1,682); Princeton, NJ
Feb 19, 2016; 7:00 pm		at Yale	W 94–81	18–4 (7–1)	John J. Lee Amphitheater (212); New Haven, CT
Feb 20, 2016; 7:00 pm		at Brown	W 83–57	19–4 (8–1)	Pizzitola Sports Center (258); Providence, RI
Feb 26, 2016; 7:00 pm		at Columbia	W 77–48	20–4 (9–1)	Levien Gymnasium (490); New York, NY
Feb 27, 2016; 6:00 pm		at Cornell	W 94–57	21–4 (10–1)	Newman Arena (850); Ithaca, NY
Mar 4, 2016; 7:00 pm		Harvard	W 79–69	22–4 (11–1)	Jadwin Gymnasium (1,234); Princeton, NJ
Mar 5, 2016; 7:30 pm		Dartmouth	W 68–42	23–4 (12–1)	Jadwin Gymnasium (1,057); Princeton, NJ
Mar 8, 2016; 5:30 pm		Penn	L 60–62	23–5 (12–2)	Jadwin Gymnasium (1,278); Princeton, NJ
NCAA Women's Tournament
Mar 18, 2016*; 12:00 pm, ESPN2	(11 SF)	vs. (6 SF) West Virginia; First Round	L 65–74	23–6	St. John Arena; Columbus, OH
*Non-conference game. ^{#}Rankings from AP Poll. (#) Tournament seedings in parentheses. SF=Sioux Falls Region. All times are in Eastern Time.

== Rankings ==
Ranking movement Legend: ██ Increase in ranking. ██ Decrease in ranking. ██ Not ranked the previous week. RV=Received votes.
Poll	Pre- season	Week 2	Week 3	Week 4	Week 5	Week 6	Week 7	Week 8	Week 9	Week 10	Week 11	Week 12	Week 13	Week 14	Week 15	Week 16	Week 17	Week 18	Week 19	Final
AP	RV	RV	RV	RV	RV	RV	RV	RV	NR	NR	NR	NR	NR	NR	NR	NR	RV	RV	NR	NR
Coaches	25	24т	RV	RV	RV	RV	RV	RV	RV	NR	RV	RV	RV	NR	NR	NR	NR	NR	NR	NR

== See also ==
- 2015–16 Princeton Tigers men's basketball team
