= 2015–16 Northwestern Wildcats women's basketball team =

Intercollegiate basketball season

2015–16 Northwestern Wildcats women's basketball

Lone Star Showcase Champions

WNIT, First Round
- Conference: Big Ten Conference
- Record: 18–17 (4–14 B1G)
- Head coach: Joe McKeown (8th season)
- Assistant coaches: Sam Dixon; Carrie Banks; Shauna Green
- Home arena: Welsh-Ryan Arena

2015–16 Big Ten women's basketball standings
	Conf.				Overall
Team	W		L	PCT	W		L	PCT
No. 5 Maryland†	16	–	2	.889	31	–	4	.886
No. 9 Ohio State	15	–	3	.833	26	–	8	.765
No. 16 Michigan State	13	–	5	.722	25	–	9	.735
Indiana	12	–	6	.667	21	–	12	.636
Minnesota	11	–	7	.611	20	–	12	.625
Purdue	10	–	8	.556	20	–	12	.625
Michigan	9	–	9	.500	21	–	14	.600
Nebraska	9	–	9	.500	18	–	13	.581
Iowa	8	–	10	.444	19	–	14	.576
Rutgers	8	–	10	.444	19	–	15	.559
Penn State	6	–	12	.333	12	–	19	.387
Northwestern	4	–	14	.222	18	–	17	.514
Wisconsin	3	–	15	.167	7	–	22	.241
Illinois	2	–	16	.111	9	–	21	.300
† 2016 Big Ten tournament winner As of March 31, 2016; Rankings from AP poll

The 2015–16 Northwestern Wildcats women's basketball team represented Northwestern University during the 2015–16 NCAA Division I women's basketball season. The Wildcats, led by eighth year head coach Joe McKeown, played their home games at the Welsh-Ryan Arena and were members of the Big Ten Conference. They finished the season 18–17, 4–14 in Big Ten play to finish in twelfth place. They advanced to the semifinals of the Big Ten women's tournament, where they lost to Maryland. They were invited to the Women's National Invitation Tournament, where they lost to San Diego in the first round.

== Roster ==
2015–16 Northwestern Wildcats women's basketball team
Players
Coaches

Pos.	#	Name	Height	Year	Previous school	Hometown
G	2	Tessa Haldes	5 ft 10 in (1.78 m)	Sr	Whitney Young	Chicago, IL
G	3	Ashley Deary	5 ft 4 in (1.63 m)	Jr	Flower Mound	Flower Mound, TX
G	5	Jordan Hankins	5 ft 8 in (1.73 m)	Fr	Lawrence North	Indianapolis, IN
F	10	Nia Coffey	6 ft 1 in (1.85 m)	Jr	Hopkins	Minneapolis, MN
F	11	Lauren Douglas	6 ft 2 in (1.88 m)	Sr	Briarcrest Christian	Collierville, TN
G	12	Lydia Rohde	5 ft 10 in (1.78 m)	So	Brookfield Central	Brookfield, WI
G	13	Nof Kedem	5 ft 6 in (1.68 m)	Sr	Ostrovski	Olesh, Israel
F	14	Pallas Kunaiyi-Akpannah	6 ft 2 in (1.88 m)	Fr	Rabun Gap-Nacoochee School	Abuja, Nigeria
G	24	Christen Inman	5 ft 10 in (1.78 m)	Jr	Seven Lakes	Katy, TX
G	25	Maggie Lyon	6 ft 1 in (1.85 m)	Jr	New Trier	Wilmette, IL
F/C	30	Allie Tuttle	6 ft 4 in (1.93 m)	Jr	Panther Creek	Cary, NC
F	32	Christen Johnson	6 ft 3 in (1.91 m)	Sr	The Lovett School	Powder Springs, GA
C	33	Oceana Hamilton (I) (redshirt)	6 ft 4 in (1.93 m)	Jr	St. Edmund Campion; Alabama	Mississauga, ON
F	34	Amber Jamison	6 ft 0 in (1.83 m)	Fr	Rochester Adams	Rochester Hills, MI
G	35	Maya Jonas	6 ft 2 in (1.88 m)	So	Whitefish Bay	Whitefish Bay, WI

Head coach

Joe McKeown (Mercer)

Assistant coach(es)

Sam Dixon (Wooster)
Carrie Banks (Detroit Mercy)
Shauna Green (Canisius)

Legend

- (C) Team captain
- (S) Suspended
- (I) Ineligible
- (W) Walk-on
- Injured
- Current redshirt

Roster

== Schedule ==
Date time, TV	Rank^{#}	Opponent^{#}	Result	Record	Site (attendance) city, state
Exhibition
11/08/2015*; 2:00 pm	No. 19	Seton Hill	W 103–44		Welsh-Ryan Arena; Evanston, IL
Non-conference regular season
11/15/2015*; 6:00 pm	No. 19	Howard	W 89–49	1–0	Welsh-Ryan Arena (623); Evanston, IL
11/19/2015*; 7:00 pm	No. 20	Idaho State	W 72–36	2–0	Welsh-Ryan Arena (420); Evanston, IL
11/22/2015*; 2:00 pm	No. 20	Western Michigan	W 86–62	3–0	Welsh-Ryan Arena (652); Evanston, IL
11/26/2015*; 5:00 pm	No. 19	vs. Eastern Washington; Lone Star Showcase	W 74–70	4–0	Cedar Park Center; Cedar Park, TX
11/27/2015*; 7:30 pm	No. 19	vs. Creighton; Lone Star Showcase	W 75–52	5–0	Cedar Park Center (687); Cedar Park, TX
11/28/2015*; 7:30 pm	No. 19	vs. East Carolina; Lone Star Showcase	W 78–75	6–0	Cedar Park Center (379); Cedar Park, TX
12/02/2015*; 5:00 pm, ESPN3	No. 15	at North Carolina; ACC–Big Ten Women's Challenge	W 85–72	7–0	Carmichael Auditorium (1,664); Chapel Hill, NC
12/06/2015*; 2:00 pm	No. 15	Milwaukee	W 69–44	8–0	Welsh-Ryan Arena (812); Evanston, IL
12/13/2015*; 2:00 pm	No. 12	at Loyola–Chicago	W 81–72	9–0	Joseph J. Gentile Arena (411); Chicago, IL
12/15/2015*; 11:00 am	No. 12	Alcorn State	W 91–47	10–0	Welsh-Ryan Arena (5,246); Evanston, IL
12/19/2015*; 5:00 pm	No. 12	No. 16 DePaul	L 64–77	10–1	Welsh-Ryan Arena (1,744); Evanston, IL
12/22/2015*; 1:00 pm	No. 15	UMKC	W 80–38	11–1	Welsh-Ryan Arena (625); Evanston, IL
Big Ten regular season
12/31/2015; 1:00 pm	No. 14	at Penn State	L 72–79	11–2 (0–1)	Bryce Jordan Center (2,956); University Park, PA
01/03/2016; 1:00 pm, BTN	No. 14	Nebraska	W 85–62	12–2 (1–1)	Welsh-Ryan Arena (1,249); Evanston, IL
01/07/2016; 7:00 pm	No. 16	Purdue	L 71–85	12–3 (1–2)	Welsh-Ryan Arena (714); Evanston, IL
01/10/2016; 1:00 pm, BTN	No. 16	at No. 23 Michigan State	L 51–74	12–4 (1–3)	Breslin Center (6,272); East Lansing, MI
01/14/2016; 7:00 pm, BTN		No. 5 Ohio State	W 86–82	13–4 (2–3)	Welsh-Ryan Arena (852); Evanston, IL
01/17/2016; 11:00 am, BTN		at No. 8 Maryland	L 62–80	13–5 (2–4)	Xfinity Center (6,037); College Park, MD
01/20/2016; 7:00 pm		at Minnesota	L 92–95	13–6 (2–5)	Williams Arena (2,549); Minneapolis, MN
01/24/2016; 4:00 pm, BTN		Indiana	L 84–91	13–7 (2–6)	Welsh-Ryan Arena (1,642); Evanston, IL
01/28/2016; 6:00 pm, BTN		at No. 7 Ohio State	L 73–76	13–8 (2–7)	Value City Arena (4,606); Columbus, OH
01/31/2016; 2:00 pm		Iowa	L 64–79	13–9 (2–8)	Welsh-Ryan Arena (2,016); Evanston, IL
02/04/2016; 7:00 pm		Illinois	W 69–59	14–9 (3–8)	Welsh-Ryan Arena (1,331); Evanston, IL
02/07/2016; 2:00 pm, BTN		Minnesota	L 106–112 ^{2OT}	14–10 (3–9)	Welsh-Ryan Arena (1,223); Evanston, IL
02/10/2016; 6:00 pm		at Rutgers	L 59–61	14–11 (3–10)	Louis Brown Athletic Center (3,177); Piscataway, NJ
02/14/2016; 3:00 pm, ESPN2		No. 5 Maryland	L 70–79	14–12 (3–11)	Welsh-Ryan Arena (1,792); Evanston, IL
02/17/2016; 7:00 pm		Penn State	L 54–73	14–13 (3–12)	Welsh-Ryan Arena (796); Evanston, IL
02/20/2016; 1:00 pm, BTN		at Wisconsin	W 71–53	15–13 (4–12)	Kohl Center (3,942); Madison, WI
02/23/2016; 5:30 pm, BTN		Michigan	L 65–70	15–14 (4–13)	Welsh-Ryan Arena (1,140); Evanston, IL
02/28/2016; 3:00 pm, BTN		at Nebraska	L 67–76	15–15 (4–14)	Pinnacle Bank Arena (6,596); Lincoln, NE
Big Ten Women's Tournament
03/02/2016; 12:30 pm, BTN		vs. Wisconsin; First Round	W 76–72 ^{OT}	16–15	Bankers Life Fieldhouse; Indianapolis, IN
03/03/2016; 1:30 pm, BTN		vs. Minnesota; Second Round	W 84–74	17–15	Bankers Life Fieldhouse; Indianapolis, IN
03/04/2016; 1:30 pm, BTN		vs. Indiana; Quarterfinals	W 79–73	18–15	Bankers Life Fieldhouse; Indianapolis, IN
03/05/2016; 2:00 pm, BTN		vs. No. 5 Maryland; Semifinals	L 62–83	18–16	Bankers Life Fieldhouse; Indianapolis, IN
WNIT
03/17/2016*; 7:00 pm		San Diego; First Round	L 65–69	18–17	Welsh-Ryan Arena (416); Evanston, IL
*Non-conference game. ^{#}Rankings from AP Poll. (#) Tournament seedings in parentheses. All times are in Central Time.

== Rankings ==
Regular season polls
Poll	Pre- Season	Week 2	Week 3	Week 4	Week 5	Week 6	Week 7	Week 8	Week 9	Week 10	Week 11	Week 12	Week 13	Week 14	Week 15	Week 16	Week 17	Week 18	Week 19	Final
AP	19	20	19	15	12	12	15	14	16	RV	RV	NR	NR	NR	NR	NR	NR	NR	NR	N/A
Coaches	24	22	19	16	14	13	15	15	17	24	20	RV	NR	NR	NR	NR	NR	NR	NR	NR

Legend
	Increase in ranking
	Decrease in ranking
	Not ranked previous week
(RV)	Received Votes

== See also ==
2015–16 Northwestern Wildcats men's basketball team
