= 2015–16 Penn State Lady Lions basketball team =

Intercollegiate basketball season

2015–16 Penn State Lady Lions basketball
- Conference: Big Ten Conference
- Record: 12–19 (6–12 B1G)
- Head coach: Coquese Washington (9th season)
- Assistant coaches: Itoro Coleman; Kia Damon; Jocelyn Wyatt
- Home arena: Bryce Jordan Center

2015–16 Big Ten women's basketball standings
	Conf.				Overall
Team	W		L	PCT	W		L	PCT
No. 5 Maryland†	16	–	2	.889	31	–	4	.886
No. 9 Ohio State	15	–	3	.833	26	–	8	.765
No. 16 Michigan State	13	–	5	.722	25	–	9	.735
Indiana	12	–	6	.667	21	–	12	.636
Minnesota	11	–	7	.611	20	–	12	.625
Purdue	10	–	8	.556	20	–	12	.625
Michigan	9	–	9	.500	21	–	14	.600
Nebraska	9	–	9	.500	18	–	13	.581
Iowa	8	–	10	.444	19	–	14	.576
Rutgers	8	–	10	.444	19	–	15	.559
Penn State	6	–	12	.333	12	–	19	.387
Northwestern	4	–	14	.222	18	–	17	.514
Wisconsin	3	–	15	.167	7	–	22	.241
Illinois	2	–	16	.111	9	–	21	.300
† 2016 Big Ten tournament winner As of March 31, 2016; Rankings from AP poll

The 2015–16 Penn State Lady Lions basketball team represented Pennsylvania State University during the 2015–16 NCAA Division I women's basketball season. The Lady Lions, led by ninth year head coach Coquese Washington, played their home games at the Bryce Jordan Center and were members of the Big Ten Conference. They finished the season 12–19, 6–12 in Big Ten play to finish in eleventh place. They advanced to the second round of the Big Ten women's tournament, where they lost to Purdue.

== Roster ==
2015–16 Penn State Nittany Lions women's basketball team
Players
Coaches

Pos.	#	Name	Height	Year	Previous school	Hometown
C	1	Candice Agee	6 ft 6 in (1.98 m)	Sr	Silverado	Victorville, CA
G	2	Amari Carter (injured)	5 ft 8 in (1.73 m)	Fr	St. John's College	Washington, D.C.
G	3	Brianna Banks	5 ft 9 in (1.75 m)	RS Sr	Fayette County; Connecticut	Newnan, GA
G	5	Sierra Moore (injured)	5 ft 11 in (1.8 m)	RS Jr	Delone Catholic; Duke	Hanover, PA
G	10	Keke Sevillian (injured)	5 ft 7 in (1.7 m)	Jr	Goodrich	Goodrich, MI
G	11	Teniya Page	5 ft 7 in (1.7 m)	Fr	Marian Catholic	Chicago, IL
G	12	Lindsey Spann	5 ft 6 in (1.68 m)	RS So	Good Counsel	Laurel, MD
F	15	Kaliyah Mitchell	6 ft 2 in (1.88 m)	Jr	Stephenson	Stone Mountain, GA
F	23	Jaylen Williams	6 ft 3 in (1.91 m)	Fr	Archbishop Williams	Easton, MA
C	24	Ashanti Thomas	6 ft 4 in (1.93 m)	Fr	Lafayette	Lexington, KY
G/F	25	Peyton Whitted	6 ft 3 in (1.91 m)	So	North Gwinnett	Suwanee, GA

Head coach

- Coquese Washington (Notre Dame)

Assistant coach(es)

- Itoro Coleman (Clemson)
- Kia Damon (Millersville)
- Jocelyn Wyatt (Appalachian State)

Legend

- (C) Team captain
- (S) Suspended
- (I) Ineligible
- (W) Walk-on
- Injured
- Current redshirt

Roster

== Schedule ==
Date time, TV	Rank^{#}	Opponent^{#}	Result	Record	Site (attendance) city, state
Exhibition
11/01/2015*; 2:00 pm		California (PA)	W 84–58		Bryce Jordan Center (2,687); University Park, PA
Non-conference regular season
11/13/2015*; 7:00 pm		Holy Cross	W 86–82 ^{OT}	1–0	Bryce Jordan Center (2,941); University Park, PA
11/15/2015*; 2:00 pm		Fordham	W 75–59	2–0	Bryce Jordan Center (3,024); University Park, PA
11/18/2015*; 8:00 pm, SECN		at No. 4 Tennessee	L 66–74	2–1	Thompson–Boling Arena (8,858); Knoxville, TN
11/22/2015*; 2:00 pm		Central Connecticut	W 73–47	3–1	Bryce Jordan Center (2,856); University Park, PA
11/27/2015*; 10:30 pm		at Cal State Northridge; Radisson Thanksgiving Classic semifinals	L 73–81	3–2	Matadome (586); Northridge, CA
11/28/2015*; 5:00 pm		vs. BYU; Radisson Thanksgiving Classic 3rd place game	L 51–63	3–3	Matadome; Northridge, CA
12/03/2015*; 8:00 pm, BTN		Virginia Tech; ACC–Big Ten Women's Challenge	L 59–64	3–4	Bryce Jordan Center (2,897); University Park, PA
12/06/2015*; 3:00 pm, CBSSN		at No. 24 South Florida	L 79–101	3–5	USF Sun Dome (1,908); Tampa, FL
12/08/2015*; 7:00 pm		Youngstown State	W 68–51	4–5	Bryce Jordan Center (2,627); University Park, PA
12/12/2015*; 1:30 pm		at St. Bonaventure	L 60–70	4–6	Reilly Center (884); Olean, NY
12/20/2015*; 2:00 pm		Sacred Heart	W 83–46	5–6	Bryce Jordan Center (3,081); University Park, PA
Big Ten regular season
12/31/2015; 2:00 pm		No. 14 Northwestern	W 79–72	6–6 (1–0)	Bryce Jordan Center (2,956); University Park, PA
01/03/2016; 3:00 pm		at Minnesota	L 85–98	6–7 (1–1)	Williams Arena (3,792); Minneapolis, MN
01/07/2016; 7:00 pm		No. 23 Michigan State	L 55–71	6–8 (1–2)	Bryce Jordan Center (2,885); University Park, PA
01/10/2016; 4:00 pm, BTN		at Wisconsin	L 62–82	6–9 (1–3)	Kohl Center (3,470); Madison, WI
01/13/2016; 7:00 pm		Nebraska	L 78–83	6–10 (1–4)	Bryce Jordan Center (2,745); University Park, PA
01/17/2016; 2:00 pm		Michigan	L 87–91	6–11 (1–5)	Bryce Jordan Center (9,124); University Park, PA
01/20/2016; 8:00 pm		at Iowa	W 82–69	7–11 (2–5)	Carver–Hawkeye Arena (3,873); Iowa City, IA
01/23/2016; 3:00 pm		at Illinois	W 65–56	8–11 (3–5)	State Farm Center (3,776); Champaign, IL
01/27/2016; 7:00 pm		No. 5 Maryland	L 53–89	8–12 (3–6)	Bryce Jordan Center (3,052); University Park, PA
01/30/2016; 2:00 pm		Purdue	L 78–88 ^{2OT}	8–13 (3–7)	Bryce Jordan Center (3,769); University Park, PA
02/02/2016; 8:00 pm, BTN		at Nebraska	L 69–87	8–14 (3–8)	Pinnacle Bank Arena (4,486); Lincoln, NE
02/07/2016; 2:00 pm		Rutgers	L 62–74	8–15 (3–9)	Bryce Jordan Center (3,677); University Park, PA
02/11/2016; 6:30 pm, BTN		at No. 17 Michigan State	W 65–61	9–15 (4–9)	Breslin Center (5,588); East Lansing, MI
02/14/2016; 2:00 pm, BTN		No. 7 Ohio State	L 63–77	9–16 (4–10)	Bryce Jordan Center; University Park, PA
02/17/2016; 8:00 pm		at Northwestern	W 73–54	10–16 (5–10)	Welsh-Ryan Arena (796); Evanston, IL
02/20/2016; 12:00 pm, BTN		at Michigan	L 73–78	10–17 (5–11)	Crisler Center (2,920); Ann Arbor, MI
02/24/2016; 7:00 pm		Iowa	W 81–68	11–17 (6–11)	Bryce Jordan Center (2,812); University Park, PA
02/27/2016; 4:00 pm, BTN		at Indiana	L 55–76	11–18 (6–12)	Assembly Hall (5,246); Bloomington, IN
Big Ten Women's Tournament
03/02/2016; 4:00 pm, BTN		vs. Illinois; First Round	W 75–66	12–18	Bankers Life Fieldhouse; Indianapolis, IN
03/03/2016; 9:00 pm, BTN		vs. Purdue; Second Round	L 59–70	12–19	Bankers Life Fieldhouse; Indianapolis, IN
*Non-conference game. ^{#}Rankings from AP Poll. (#) Tournament seedings in parentheses. All times are in Eastern Time.

== Rankings ==
Regular season polls
Poll	Pre- Season	Week 2	Week 3	Week 4	Week 5	Week 6	Week 7	Week 8	Week 9	Week 10	Week 11	Week 12	Week 13	Week 14	Week 15	Week 16	Week 17	Week 18	Week 19	Final
AP	NR	NR	RV	NR	NR	NR	NR	NR	NR	NR	NR	NR	NR	NR	NR	NR	NR	NR	NR	N/A
Coaches	NR	NR	RV	NR	NR	NR	NR	NR	NR	NR	NR	NR	NR	NR	NR	NR	NR	NR	NR	NR

Legend
	Increase in ranking
	Decrease in ranking
	Not ranked previous week
(RV)	Received Votes

== See also ==
2015–16 Penn State Nittany Lions basketball team
