= 2015–16 Michigan Wolverines women's basketball team =

Intercollegiate basketball season

2015–16 Michigan Wolverines women's basketball

WNIT, Semifinals
- Conference: Big Ten Conference
- Record: 21–14 (9–9 B1G)
- Head coach: Kim Barnes Arico (4th season)
- Assistant coaches: Melanie Moore; Megan Duffy; Joy McCorvey
- Home arena: Crisler Center

2015–16 Big Ten women's basketball standings
	Conf.				Overall
Team	W		L	PCT	W		L	PCT
No. 5 Maryland†	16	–	2	.889	31	–	4	.886
No. 9 Ohio State	15	–	3	.833	26	–	8	.765
No. 16 Michigan State	13	–	5	.722	25	–	9	.735
Indiana	12	–	6	.667	21	–	12	.636
Minnesota	11	–	7	.611	20	–	12	.625
Purdue	10	–	8	.556	20	–	12	.625
Michigan	9	–	9	.500	21	–	14	.600
Nebraska	9	–	9	.500	18	–	13	.581
Iowa	8	–	10	.444	19	–	14	.576
Rutgers	8	–	10	.444	19	–	15	.559
Penn State	6	–	12	.333	12	–	19	.387
Northwestern	4	–	14	.222	18	–	17	.514
Wisconsin	3	–	15	.167	7	–	22	.241
Illinois	2	–	16	.111	9	–	21	.300
† 2016 Big Ten tournament winner As of March 31, 2016; Rankings from AP poll

The 2015–16 Michigan Wolverines women's basketball team represented University of Michigan during the 2015–16 NCAA Division I women's basketball season. The Wolverines, led by fourth year head coach Kim Barnes Arico, played their home games at the Crisler Center and were members of the Big Ten Conference. They finished the season 21–14, 9–9 in Big Ten play to finish in a tie for seventh place. They lost in the second round of the Big Ten women's tournament to Iowa. They were invited to the Women's National Invitation Tournament defeated Wright State, Bucknell and San Diego in the first, second and third rounds, Temple in the quarterfinals before losing to Florida Gulf Coast in the semifinals.

== Roster ==
2015–16 Michigan Wolverines women's basketball team
Players
Coaches

Pos.	#	Name	Height	Year	Previous school	Hometown
G	1	Madison Ristovski	5 ft 10 in (1.78 m)	Sr	University Liggett	Sterling Heights, MI
G	2	Siera Thompson (C)	5 ft 7 in (1.7 m)	So	Serra	Gardena, CA
G	3	Katelynn Flaherty	5 ft 7 in (1.7 m)	So	Metuchen	Point Pleasant, NJ
G	4	Hallie Wangler	5 ft 9 in (1.75 m)	RS Sr	Shrine Catholic	Royal Oak, MI
G	10	Nicole Munger	5 ft 11 in (1.8 m)	Fr	Central Bucks West	Doylestown, PA
G	11	Jillian Dunston	5 ft 11 in (1.8 m)	So	Academy of the Holy Cross	Germantown, MD
C	12	Terra Stapleton	6 ft 4 in (1.93 m)	So	Fairland	Proctorville, OH
G	20	Danielle Williams (C)	5 ft 9 in (1.75 m)	Jr	St. Mary's	Phoenix, AZ
F	21	Sam Trammel	6 ft 1 in (1.85 m)	So	Eastview	Minnetonka, MN
G/F	23	Maria Backman	6 ft 1 in (1.85 m)	Fr	Cardinal Spellman	Bronx, NY
F	24	Emoni Jackson	6 ft 1 in (1.85 m)	So	Long Beach Polytechnic	Pasadena, CA
C	30	Hallie Thome	6 ft 5 in (1.96 m)	Fr	Chagrin Falls	Chagrin Falls, OH
F	32	Kelsey Mitchell	6 ft 0 in (1.83 m)	Sr	Inkster	Detroit, MI
G	34	Boogie Brozoski	5 ft 6 in (1.68 m)	Fr	Long Island Lutheran	Cambria Heights, NY

Head coach

Kim Barnes Arico (Montclair State)

Assistant coach(es)

Melanie Moore (Siena)
Megan Duffy (Notre Dame)
Joy McCorvey (St. John's)

Legend

- (C) Team captain
- (S) Suspended
- (I) Ineligible
- (W) Walk-on
- Injured
- Current redshirt

Roster

== Schedule ==
Date time, TV	Rank^{#}	Opponent^{#}	Result	Record	Site (attendance) city, state
Exhibition
11/08/2015*; 2:00 pm		Ferris State	W 109–39		Crisler Center (1,240); Ann Arbor, MI
Non-conference regular season
11/14/2015*; 12:00 pm		Binghamton	W 90–62	1–0	Crisler Center (1,906); Ann Arbor, MI
11/15/2015*; 2:00 pm, ESPN3		at Detroit	W 88–61	2–0	Calihan Hall (1,313); Detroit, MI
11/19/2015*; 7:00 pm		Xavier	W 92–54	3–0	Crisler Center (2,613); Ann Arbor, MI
11/23/2015*; 7:00 pm		USC Upstate	W 119–61	4–0	Crisler Center (1,589); Ann Arbor, MI
11/27/2015*; 7:00 pm		Hartford	W 83–47	5–0	Crisler Center (2,004); Ann Arbor, MI
11/29/2015*; 2:00 pm		Oral Roberts	W 61–44	6–0	Crisler Center (1,809); Ann Arbor, MI
12/03/2015*; 7:00 pm		Pittsburgh; ACC–Big Ten Women's Challenge	W 82–45	7–0	Crisler Center (1,737); Ann Arbor, MI
12/06/2015*; 4:00 pm, ESPN2		at Princeton	L 57–74	7–1	Jadwin Gymnasium (1,851); Princeton, NJ
12/13/2015*; 2:00 pm, BTN		No. 20 UCLA	L 77–86	7–2	Crisler Center (2,834); Ann Arbor, MI
12/19/2015*; 2:30 pm		Miami (OH)	W 97–55	8–2	Crisler Center (2,396); Ann Arbor, MI
12/23/2015*; 3:30 pm, ESPN3		at Eastern Michigan	L 63–64	8–3	Convocation Center (1,757); Ypsilanti, MI
Big Ten regular season
12/31/2015; 1:00 pm		Purdue	L 63–65	8–4 (0–1)	Crisler Center (3,159); Ann Arbor, MI
01/03/2016; 12:30 pm, BTN		at Indiana	L 69–77 ^{OT}	8–5 (0–2)	Assembly Hall (3,602); Bloomington, IN
01/07/2016; 7:00 pm		Iowa	W 82–75	9–5 (1–2)	Crisler Center (1,889); Ann Arbor, MI
01/10/2016; 3:00 pm		at Minnesota	W 93–86	10–5 (2–2)	Williams Arena (3,243); Minneapolis, MN
01/14/2016; 6:00 pm, BTN		No. 8 Maryland	L 67–74	10–6 (2–3)	Crisler Center (1,752); Ann Arbor, MI
01/17/2016; 2:00 pm		at Penn State	W 91–87	11–6 (2–4)	Bryce Jordan Center (9,124); University Park, PA
01/21/2016; 6:00 pm, BTN		No. 7 Ohio State; Rivalry	L 93–97	11–7 (3–4)	Crisler Center (2,093); Ann Arbor, MI
01/24/2016; 2:00 pm		Nebraska	L 81–93	11–8 (3–5)	Crisler Center (3,082); Ann Arbor, MI
01/28/2016; 8:00 pm		at Iowa	L 69–85	11–9 (3–6)	Carver–Hawkeye Arena (3,780); Iowa City, IA
01/31/2016; 12:30 pm, BTN		Minnesota	W 92–76	12–9 (4–6)	Crisler Center (2,778); Ann Arbor, MI
02/03/2016; 7:00 pm		at No. 17 Michigan State; Rivalry	L 64–85	12–10 (4–7)	Breslin Center (8,003); East Lansing, MI
02/07/2016; 2:00 pm		Illinois	W 96–83	13–10 (5–7)	Crisler Center (2,509); Ann Arbor, MI
02/11/2016; 7:00 pm		Wisconsin	W 82–65	14–10 (6–7)	Crisler Center (1,777); Ann Arbor, MI
02/14/2016; 2:00 pm		at Purdue	W 68–61	15–10 (7–7)	Mackey Arena (6,427); West Lafayette, IN
02/17/2016; 7:00 pm		at No. 6 Maryland	L 56–76	15–11 (7–8)	Xfinity Center (5,100); College Park, MD
02/20/2016; 12:00 pm, BTN		Penn State	W 78–73	16–11 (8–8)	Crisler Center (2,920); Ann Arbor, MI
02/23/2016; 6:30 pm, BTN		at Northwestern	W 70–65	17–11 (9–8)	Welsh-Ryan Arena (1,140); Evanston, IL
02/28/2016; 2:00 pm, BTN		at Rutgers	L 50–72	17–12 (9–9)	Louis Brown Athletic Center (3,505); Piscataway, NJ
Big Ten Women's Tournament
03/03/2016; 12:00 pm, BTN		vs. Iowa; Second Round	L 85–97	17–13	Bankers Life Fieldhouse; Indianapolis, IN
WNIT
03/16/2016*; 7:00 pm		Wright State; First Round	W 81–53	18–13	Crisler Center (658); Ann Arbor, MI
03/19/2016*; 2:00 pm		Bucknell; Second Round	W 95–72	19–13	Crisler Center (938); Ann Arbor, MI
03/22/2016*; 7:00 pm		San Diego; Third Round	W 78–51	20–13	Crisler Center (1,000); Ann Arbor, MI
03/28/2016*; 7:00 pm		Temple; Quarterfinals	W 77–76	21–13	Crisler Center (1,457); Ann Arbor, MI
03/31/2016*; 8:00 pm, ESPN3		at Florida Gulf Coast; Semifinals	L 62–71	21–14	Alico Arena (4,633); Fort Myers, FL
*Non-conference game. ^{#}Rankings from AP Poll. (#) Tournament seedings in parentheses. All times are in Eastern Time.

== See also ==
- 2015–16 Michigan Wolverines men's basketball team
