= 2015–16 Iowa Hawkeyes women's basketball team =

Intercollegiate basketball season

2015–16 Iowa Hawkeyes women's basketball

Hawkeye Classic champions

WNIT, First Round
- Conference: Big Ten Conference
- Record: 19–14 (8–10 Big Ten)
- Head coach: Lisa Bluder (16th season)
- Assistant coaches: Jan Jensen; Jenni Fitzgerald; Lacey Goldwire
- Home arena: Carver–Hawkeye Arena

2015–16 Big Ten women's basketball standings
	Conf.				Overall
Team	W		L	PCT	W		L	PCT
No. 5 Maryland†	16	–	2	.889	31	–	4	.886
No. 9 Ohio State	15	–	3	.833	26	–	8	.765
No. 16 Michigan State	13	–	5	.722	25	–	9	.735
Indiana	12	–	6	.667	21	–	12	.636
Minnesota	11	–	7	.611	20	–	12	.625
Purdue	10	–	8	.556	20	–	12	.625
Michigan	9	–	9	.500	21	–	14	.600
Nebraska	9	–	9	.500	18	–	13	.581
Iowa	8	–	10	.444	19	–	14	.576
Rutgers	8	–	10	.444	19	–	15	.559
Penn State	6	–	12	.333	12	–	19	.387
Northwestern	4	–	14	.222	18	–	17	.514
Wisconsin	3	–	15	.167	7	–	22	.241
Illinois	2	–	16	.111	9	–	21	.300
† 2016 Big Ten tournament winner As of March 31, 2016; Rankings from AP poll

The 2015–16 Iowa Hawkeyes women's basketball team represented University of Iowa during the 2015–16 NCAA Division I women's basketball season. The Hawkeyes, led by sixteenth-year head coach Lisa Bluder, played their home games at the Carver–Hawkeye Arena and were members of the Big Ten Conference. They finished the season 19–14, 8–10 in Big Ten play to finish in a tie for ninth place. They advanced to the quarterfinals of the Big Ten women's tournament, where they lost to Maryland. They were invited to the Women's National Invitation Tournament, where they lost to Ball State in the first round.

== Roster ==
2015–16 Iowa Hawkeyes women's basketball team
Players
Coaches

Pos.	#	Name	Height	Year	Previous school	Hometown
G	1	Alexa Kastanek	5 ft 10 in (1.78 m)	Jr	Southeast	Lincoln, NE
G	2	Ally Disterhoft	6 ft 0 in (1.83 m)	Jr	West	Iowa City, IA
F	3	Claire Till	6 ft 0 in (1.83 m)	Sr	Wahlert	Dubuque, IA
F	4	Chase Coley	6 ft 3 in (1.91 m)	So	Washburn	Minneapolis, MN
F	10	Megan Gustafson	6 ft 3 in (1.91 m)	Fr	South Shore	Port Wing, WI
G	11	Tania Davis	5 ft 4 in (1.63 m)	Fr	Goodrich	Grand Blanc, MI
G	15	Whitney Jennings	5 ft 5 in (1.65 m)	So	Logansport	Logansport, IN
F	21	Hannah Stewart	6 ft 2 in (1.88 m)	Fr	Bishop Ryan Catholic	Minot, ND
F	23	Christina Buttenham	6 ft 0 in (1.83 m)	So	St. Mary Catholic Secondary	Hamilton, ON
F	24	Tagyn Larson	6 ft 2 in (1.88 m)	Fr	Roosevelt	Sioux Falls, SD
F	25	Kali Peschel	6 ft 1 in (1.85 m)	Sr	Sauke Centre	Sauk Centre, MN
F	34	Carly Mohns	6 ft 1 in (1.85 m)	So	Brodhead	Brodhead, WI
F	40	Hailey Schneden	6 ft 2 in (1.88 m)	Jr	Assumption	Davenport, IA
C	45	Nicole Smith	6 ft 4 in (1.93 m)	Sr	Hononegah	Rockton, IL

Head coach

- Lisa Bluder (Northern Iowa)

Assistant coach(es)

- Jan Jensen (Drake)
- Jenni Fitzgerald (Drake)
- Lacey Goldwire (Oklahoma State)

Legend

- (C) Team captain
- (S) Suspended
- (I) Ineligible
- (W) Walk-on
- Injured
- Current redshirt

Roster

== Schedule ==
Date time, TV	Rank^{#}	Opponent^{#}	Result	Record	Site (attendance) city, state
Exhibition
11/08/2015*; 2:00 pm		Upper Iowa	W 95–41		Carver–Hawkeye Arena (3,614); Iowa City, IA
Non-conference regular season
11/13/2015*; 6:00 pm		North Dakota; Hawkeye Challenge	W 83–61	1–0	Carver–Hawkeye Arena (4,358); Iowa City, IA
11/15/2015*; 1:00 pm		Tennessee–Martin; Hawkeye Challenge	W 62–56	2–0	Carver–Hawkeye Arena (3,555); Iowa City, IA
11/19/2015*; 7:00 pm		Western Illinois	W 96–81 ^{OT}	3–0	Carver–Hawkeye Arena (3,543); Iowa City, IA
11/22/2015*; 2:00 pm, ESPN3		at Northern Iowa	W 80–65	4–0	McLeod Center (2,384); Cedar Falls, IA
11/26/2015*; 11:00 am	No. 25	vs. Wright State; Lone Star Showcase	W 83–77	5–0	Cedar Park Center; Cedar Park, TX
11/27/2015*; 1:30 pm	No. 25	vs. No. 24 George Washington; Lone Star Showcase	L 77–81 ^{2OT}	5–1	Cedar Park Center (627); Cedar Park, TX
11/28/2015*; 11:00 am	No. 25	vs. Houston; Lone Star Showcase	W 64–50	6–1	Cedar Park Center; Cedar Park, TX
12/02/2015*; 7:00 pm		at Virginia; ACC–Big Ten Women's Challenge	W 85–73	7–1	John Paul Jones Arena (3,360); Charlottesville, VA
12/06/2015*; 1:00 pm		Robert Morris	W 65–50	8–1	Carver–Hawkeye Arena (3,620); Iowa City, IA
12/11/2015*; 7:00 pm	No. 23	at Iowa State; Iowa Corn Cy-Hawk Series	L 66–69	8–2	Hilton Coliseum (11,373); Ames, IA
12/19/2015*; 5:00 pm		Bradley	W 60–53	9–2	Carver–Hawkeye Arena (4,051); Iowa City, IA
12/22/2015*; 5:00 pm		Drake	W 89–76	10–2	Carver–Hawkeye Arena (5,430); Iowa City, IA
Big Ten regular season
12/31/2015; 1:00 pm		at Nebraska	W 74–68	11–2 (1–0)	Pinnacle Bank Arena (7,329); Lincoln, NE
01/04/2016; 7:00 pm, BTN		Rutgers	W 69–65	12–2 (2–0)	Carver–Hawkeye Arena (4,959); Iowa City, IA
01/07/2016; 6:00 pm		at Michigan	L 75–82	12–3 (2–1)	Crisler Center (1,889); Ann Arbor, MI
01/10/2016; 2:00 pm, ESPN2		No. 8 Maryland	L 56–76	12–4 (2–2)	Carver–Hawkeye Arena (7,776); Iowa City, IA
01/13/2016; 7:00 pm		at Wisconsin	W 57–54	13–4 (3–2)	Kohl Center (3,235); Madison, WI
01/16/2016; 3:30 pm, BTN		at No. 18 Michigan State	L 73–80	13–5 (3–3)	Breslin Center (9,017); East Lansing, MI
01/20/2016; 7:00 pm		Penn State	L 69–82	13–6 (3–4)	Carver–Hawkeye Arena (3,873); Iowa City, IA
01/24/2016; 2:00 pm, BTN		at Purdue	L 73–90	13–7 (3–5)	Mackey Arena (7,865); West Lafayette, IN
01/28/2016; 7:00 pm		Michigan	W 85–69	14–7 (4–5)	Carver–Hawkeye Arena (3,780); Iowa City, IA
01/31/2016; 2:00 pm		at Northwestern	W 79–64	15–7 (5–5)	Welsh-Ryan Arena (2,016); Evanston, IL
02/04/2016; 6:00 pm, BTN		at Indiana	L 74–79	15–8 (5–6)	Assembly Hall (2,421); Bloomington, IN
02/07/2016; 2:00 pm		No. 17 Michigan State	L 55–62	15–9 (5–7)	Carver–Hawkeye Arena (6,255); Iowa City, IA
02/11/2016; 7:30 pm, BTN		No. 7 Ohio State	L 81–98	15–10 (5–8)	Carver–Hawkeye Arena (3,667); Iowa City, IA
02/15/2016; 7:00 pm, BTN		at Minnesota	L 76–78	15–11 (5–9)	Williams Arena (6,167); Minneapolis, MN
02/18/2016; 7:00 pm		Purdue	W 63–55	16–11 (6–9)	Carver–Hawkeye Arena (3,659); Iowa City, IA
02/21/2016; 2:00 pm		Indiana	W 76–73	17–11 (7–9)	Carver–Hawkeye Arena (9,838); Iowa City, IA
02/24/2016; 6:00 pm		at Penn State	L 68–81	17–12 (7–10)	Bryce Jordan Center (2,812); University Park, PA
02/27/2016; 5:00 pm, BTN		Illinois	W 61–56	18–12 (8–10)	Carver–Hawkeye Arena (4,610); Iowa City, IA
Big Ten Conference Women's Tournament
03/03/2016; 11:00 am, BTN		vs. Michigan; Second Round	W 97–85	19–12	Bankers Life Fieldhouse; Indianapolis, IN
03/04/2016; 11:00 am, BTN		vs. No. 5 Maryland; Quarterfinals	L 55–75	19–13	Bankers Life Fieldhouse; Indianapolis, IN
WNIT
03/17/2016*; 7:00 pm		Ball State; First Round	L 72–77	19–14	Carver–Hawkeye Arena (2,039); Iowa City, IA
*Non-conference game. ^{#}Rankings from AP Poll. (#) Tournament seedings in parentheses. All times are in Central Time.

== See also ==
- 2015–16 Iowa Hawkeyes men's basketball team

== Rankings ==
Regular season polls
Poll	Pre- season	Week 2	Week 3	Week 4	Week 5	Week 6	Week 7	Week 8	Week 9	Week 10	Week 11	Week 12	Week 13	Week 14	Week 15	Week 16	Week 17	Week 18	Week 19	Final
AP	RV	RV	25	RV	23	RV	RV	RV	RV	RV	RV	NR	NR	NR	NR	NR	NR	NR	NR	N/A
Coaches	23	23	21	24	19	24	25	25	23	RV	RV	NR	NR	NR	NR	NR	NR	NR	NR	NR

Legend
	Increase in ranking
	Decrease in ranking
	Not ranked previous week
(RV)	Received votes
