= 2015–16 Michigan State Spartans women's basketball team =

Intercollegiate basketball season

2015–16 Michigan State Spartans women's basketball

NCAA Women's Tournament, second round
- Conference: Big Ten Conference

Ranking
- Coaches: No. 21
- AP: No. 16
- Record: 25–9 (13–5 Big Ten)
- Head coach: Suzy Merchant (9th season)
- Assistant coaches: Amaka Agugua; NcKell Copeland; Mark Simons
- Home arena: Breslin Center

2015–16 Big Ten women's basketball standings
	Conf.				Overall
Team	W		L	PCT	W		L	PCT
No. 5 Maryland†	16	–	2	.889	31	–	4	.886
No. 9 Ohio State	15	–	3	.833	26	–	8	.765
No. 16 Michigan State	13	–	5	.722	25	–	9	.735
Indiana	12	–	6	.667	21	–	12	.636
Minnesota	11	–	7	.611	20	–	12	.625
Purdue	10	–	8	.556	20	–	12	.625
Michigan	9	–	9	.500	21	–	14	.600
Nebraska	9	–	9	.500	18	–	13	.581
Iowa	8	–	10	.444	19	–	14	.576
Rutgers	8	–	10	.444	19	–	15	.559
Penn State	6	–	12	.333	12	–	19	.387
Northwestern	4	–	14	.222	18	–	17	.514
Wisconsin	3	–	15	.167	7	–	22	.241
Illinois	2	–	16	.111	9	–	21	.300
† 2016 Big Ten tournament winner As of March 31, 2016; Rankings from AP poll

The 2015–16 Michigan State Spartans women's basketball team represented Michigan State University during the 2015–16 NCAA Division I women's basketball season. The Spartans, led by ninth year head coach Suzy Merchant, played their home games at the Breslin Center and were members of the Big Ten Conference. They finished with a record of 25–9, 13–5 in Big Ten play to finish in third place. They advanced to the championship game of the Big Ten women's tournament, where they lost to Maryland. They received an at-large bid to the NCAA women's tournament, where they defeated Belmont in the first round before losing to Mississippi State in the second round.

== Roster ==
2015–16 Michigan State Spartans women's basketball team
Players
Coaches

Pos.	#	Name	Height	Year	Previous school	Hometown
G	1	Tori Jankoska	5 ft 8 in (1.73 m)	Jr	Freeland	Freeland, MI
G	2	Cara Miller	6 ft 1 in (1.85 m)	Sr	Divine Child	Farmington Hills, MI
G	3	Kalabryah Gondrezick	5 ft 8 in (1.73 m)	Fr	Benton Harbor	Benton Harbor, MI
C	4	Jasmine Hines	6 ft 3 in (1.91 m)	RS Sr	Central Lake	Central Lake, MI
F	5	Octavia Barnes	5 ft 10 in (1.78 m)	Fr	Raymond	Jackson, MS
G	10	Brannadais Agee	5 ft 11 in (1.8 m)	RS Jr	Cass Technical	Detroit, MI
F	12	Nahty Dambo	6 ft 3 in (1.91 m)	Fr	Junípero Serra	Fort-de-France, Martinique
G	13	Morgan Green	5 ft 8 in (1.73 m)	So	Pacific Collegiate; Chabot College	San Jose, CA
F	15	Victoria Gaines	6 ft 1 in (1.85 m)	Fr	Merrillville	Merrillville, IN
C	21	Hana Vesela	6 ft 4 in (1.93 m)	Fr	Brimley	Příbor, Czech Republic
G	22	Kiara Carter	5 ft 1 in (1.55 m)	So	Homewood Flossmoor	Homewood, IL
G	23	Aerial Powers	6 ft 0 in (1.83 m)	RS Jr	Detroit Country Day	Detroit, MI
G/F	24	Lexi Gussert	6 ft 0 in (1.83 m)	So	Forest Park	Crystal Falls, MI
C	33	Jenna Allen	6 ft 3 in (1.91 m)	Fr	North Lawrence	Bedford, IN
F	55	Kennedy Johnson	6 ft 2 in (1.88 m)	Fr	Wildwood Catholic	Galloway, NJ

Head coach

Suzy Merchant (Central Michigan)

Assistant coach(es)

Amaka Agugua (Hofstra)
NcKell Copeland (Jacksonville State)
Mark Simons (Michigan State)

Legend

- (C) Team captain
- (S) Suspended
- (I) Ineligible
- (W) Walk-on
- Injured
- Current redshirt

Roster

== Schedule ==
Date time, TV	Rank^{#}	Opponent^{#}	Result	Record	Site (attendance) city, state
Exhibition
11/08/2015*; 2:00 pm	No. 24	Michigan Tech	W 74–43		Breslin Center (5,252); East Lansing, MI
Non-conference regular season
11/15/2015*; 2:00 pm	No. 24	Western Michigan	W 78–40	1–0	Breslin Center (6,270); East Lansing, MI
11/18/2015*; 7:30 pm	No. 23	Georgia	W 66–45	2–0	Breslin Center (5,117); East Lansing, MI
11/21/2015*; 12:00 pm	No. 23	Idaho State	W 79–60	3–0	Breslin Center (4,984); East Lansing, MI
11/27/2015*; 5:45 pm	No. 20	vs. Cincinnati; Junkanoo Jam Lucaya Division	W 103–63	4–0	St. George HS Gymnasium (328); Freeport, BAH
11/28/2015*; 5:45 pm	No. 20	vs. No. 5 Baylor; Junkanoo Jam Lucaya Division	L 76–84	4–1	St. George HS Gymnasium (684); Freeport, BAH
12/03/2015*; 7:00 pm, ESPN2	No. 19	Louisville; ACC–Big Ten Women's Challenge	L 78–85	4–2	Breslin Center (5,721); East Lansing, MI
12/06/2015*; 2:00 pm	No. 19	Loyola–Chicago	W 76–47	5–2	Breslin Center (5,706); East Lansing, MI
12/09/2015*; 6:30 pm	No. 25	at Davidson	W 73–44	6–2	John M. Belk Arena (3,714); Davidson, NC
12/13/2015*; 3:00 pm, ESPN3	No. 25	at Oakland	W 82–62	7–2	Athletics Center O'rena (1,837); Rochester, MI
12/18/2015*; 8:00 pm, ASN	No. 24	at Northeastern; Northeastern Winter Showdown	W 77–52	8–2	Matthews Arena (1,869); Boston, MA
12/21/2015*; 7:00 pm	No. 24	Detroit	W 81–42	9–2	Breslin Center (6,540); East Lansing, MI
Big Ten regular season
12/31/2015; 12:00 pm, BTN	No. 24	at No. 9 Ohio State	L 80–85	9–3 (0–1)	Value City Arena (5,631); Columbus, OH
01/03/2016; 2:00 pm	No. 24	Wisconsin	W 77–67	10–3 (1–1)	Breslin Center (6,950); East Lansing, MI
01/07/2016; 7:00 pm	No. 23	at Penn State	W 71–55	11–3 (2–1)	Bryce Jordan Center (2,885); University Park, PA
01/10/2016; 2:00 pm, BTN	No. 23	No. 16 Northwestern	W 74–51	12–3 (3–1)	Breslin Center (6,272); East Lansing, MI
01/13/2016; 7:00 pm	No. 18	at Indiana	L 65–81	12–4 (3–2)	Assembly Hall (2,507); Bloomington, IN
01/16/2016; 4:30 pm, BTN	No. 18	Iowa	W 80–73	13–4 (4–2)	Breslin Center (9,017); East Lansing, MI
01/19/2016; 6:00 pm, BTN	No. 21	Rutgers	W 59–48	14–4 (5–2)	Breslin Center (4,911); East Lansing, MI
01/27/2016; 7:00 pm	No. 18	Purdue	W 68–56	15–4 (6–2)	Breslin Center (5,272); East Lansing, MI
01/31/2016; 4:00 pm	No. 18	at Wisconsin	W 77–54	16–4 (7–2)	Kohl Center (9,436); Madison, WI
02/03/2016; 7:00 pm	No. 17	Michigan; Rivalry	W 85–64	17–4 (8–2)	Breslin Center (8,003); East Lansing, MI
02/05/2016; 7:00 pm	No. 17	at No. 5 Maryland	L 76–85	17–5 (8–3)	Xfinity Center (5,738); College Park, MD
02/07/2016; 3:00 pm	No. 17	at Iowa	W 74–69	18–5 (9–3)	Carver–Hawkeye Arena (6,255); Iowa City, IA
02/11/2016; 6:30 pm, BTN	No. 17	Penn State	L 61–65	18–6 (9–4)	Breslin Center (5,588); East Lansing, MI
02/14/2016; 4:00 pm, BTN	No. 17	at Nebraska	L 66–73	18–7 (9–5)	Pinnacle Bank Arena (8,338); Lincoln, NE
02/18/2016; 7:00 pm	No. 25	at Rutgers	W 70–67	19–7 (10–5)	Louis Brown Athletic Center (2,156); Piscataway, NJ
02/21/2016; 1:00 pm, BTN	No. 25	Minnesota	W 114–106	20–7 (11–5)	Breslin Center (9,436); East Lansing, MI
02/24/2016; 8:00 pm	No. 20	at Illinois	W 71–43	21–7 (12–5)	State Farm Center (1,395); Champaign, IL
02/27/2016; 2:00 pm, BTN	No. 20	No. 5 Ohio State	W 107–105 ^{3OT}	22–7 (13–5)	Breslin Center (8,631); East Lansing, MI
Big Ten Women's Tournament
03/04/2016; 9:00 pm, BTN	(3) No. 19	vs. (6) Purdue; Quarterfinals	W 65–64	23–7	Bankers Life Fieldhouse; Indianapolis, IN
03/05/2016; 5:30 pm, BTN	(3) No. 19	vs. (2) No. 9 Ohio State; Semifinals	W 82–63	24–7	Bankers Life Fieldhouse; Indianapolis, IN
03/06/2016; 7:00 pm, ESPN	(3) No. 19	vs. (1) No. 5 Maryland; Championship Game	L 44–60	24–8	Bankers Life Fieldhouse (5,109); Indianapolis, IN
NCAA Women's Tournament
03/18/2016*; 12:00 pm, ESPN2	(4 B) No. 16	vs. (13 B) Belmont; First Round	W 74–60	25–8	Humphrey Coliseum; Starkville, MS
03/20/2016*; 2:30 pm, ESPN2	(4 B) No. 16	vs. (5 B) No. 15 Mississippi State; Second Round	L 72–74	25–9	Humphrey Coliseum (7,094); Starkville, MS
*Non-conference game. ^{#}Rankings from AP Poll. (#) Tournament seedings in parentheses. B=Bridgeport Region. All times are in Eastern Time.

== Rankings ==
Regular season polls
Poll	Pre- Season	Week 2	Week 3	Week 4	Week 5	Week 6	Week 7	Week 8	Week 9	Week 10	Week 11	Week 12	Week 13	Week 14	Week 15	Week 16	Week 17	Week 18	Week 19	Final
AP	24	23	20	19	25	24	24	24	23	18	21	18	17	17	25	20	19	16	16	N/A
Coaches	RV	RV	22	20	23	22	22	22	22	18	18	15	14	15	22	21	19	17	17	21

Legend
	Increase in ranking
	Decrease in ranking
	Not ranked previous week
(RV)	Received Votes

== See also ==
- 2015–16 Michigan State Spartans men's basketball team
