= 2015–16 Ohio State Buckeyes women's basketball team =

Intercollegiate basketball season

2015–16 Ohio State Buckeyes women's basketball

South Point Thanksgiving Shootout Champions

NCAA Women's Tournament, Sweet Sixteen
- Conference: Big Ten Conference

Ranking
- Coaches: No. 10
- AP: No. 9
- Record: 26–8 (15–3 B1G)
- Head coach: Kevin McGuff (3rd season)
- Assistant coaches: Joy Cheek; Patrick Klein; Mark Mitchell
- Home arena: Value City Arena

2015–16 Big Ten women's basketball standings
	Conf.				Overall
Team	W		L	PCT	W		L	PCT
No. 5 Maryland†	16	–	2	.889	31	–	4	.886
No. 9 Ohio State	15	–	3	.833	26	–	8	.765
No. 16 Michigan State	13	–	5	.722	25	–	9	.735
Indiana	12	–	6	.667	21	–	12	.636
Minnesota	11	–	7	.611	20	–	12	.625
Purdue	10	–	8	.556	20	–	12	.625
Michigan	9	–	9	.500	21	–	14	.600
Nebraska	9	–	9	.500	18	–	13	.581
Iowa	8	–	10	.444	19	–	14	.576
Rutgers	8	–	10	.444	19	–	15	.559
Penn State	6	–	12	.333	12	–	19	.387
Northwestern	4	–	14	.222	18	–	17	.514
Wisconsin	3	–	15	.167	7	–	22	.241
Illinois	2	–	16	.111	9	–	21	.300
† 2016 Big Ten tournament winner As of March 31, 2016; Rankings from AP poll

The 2015–16 Ohio State Buckeyes women's basketball team represented the Ohio State University during the 2015–16 NCAA Division I women's basketball season. The Buckeyes, led by third-year head coach Kevin McGuff, played their home games at Value City Arena and were members of the Big Ten Conference. They finished the season 24–11, 15–3 in Big Ten play to finish in second place. They advanced to the semifinals of the Big Ten women's basketball tournament, where they lost to Michigan State. They received an at-large bid to the NCAA women's tournament, where they defeated Buffalo and West Virginia in the first and second rounds before losing to Tennessee in the sweet sixteen.

== Roster ==
2015–16 Ohio State Buckeyes women's basketball team
Players
Coaches

Pos.	#	Name	Height	Year	Previous school	Hometown
G	00	Kaylan Pugh	5 ft 9 in (1.75 m)	Fr	St. Mary's Episcopal	Collierville, TN
F	1	Kalpana Beach	6 ft 1 in (1.85 m)	RS Jr	Westlake	Westlake, OH
G	3	Kelsey Mitchell	5 ft 8 in (1.73 m)	So	Princeton	Cincinnati, OH
G	4	Sierra Calhoun (I) (redshirt)	6 ft 0 in (1.83 m)	So	Christ the King; Duke	Brooklyn, NY
F	5	Chelsea Mitchell	5 ft 11 in (1.8 m)	RS Fr	Princeton	Cincinnati, OH
G	12	Kianna Holland	5 ft 9 in (1.75 m)	RS Fr	Seneca	Seneca, SC
G	13	Cait Craft	5 ft 8 in (1.73 m)	Sr	Liberty-Benton	Findlay, OH
G	14	Ameryst Alston	5 ft 9 in (1.75 m)	Sr	McKinley	Canton, OH
G	20	Asia Doss	5 ft 7 in (1.7 m)	So	Country Day School	Detroit, MI
C	21	Lisa Blair	6 ft 6 in (1.98 m)	RS Jr	Nazareth Regional	Brooklyn, NY
F	22	Alexa Hart	6 ft 3 in (1.91 m)	So	Africentric	Columbus, OH
F	23	Stephanie Mavunga (I) (redshirt)	6 ft 3 in (1.91 m)	Jr	Brownsburg; North Carolina	Brownsburg, IN
F	24	Makayla Waterman	6 ft 2 in (1.88 m)	RS Fr	Fairmont	Kettering, OH
F	32	Shayla Cooper	6 ft 2 in (1.88 m)	Jr	Norcross	Norcross, GA
C	34	Theresa Ekhelar	6 ft 6 in (1.98 m)	Fr	Life Center Academy	Woodbridge, NJ

Head coach

- Kevin McGuff (Saint Joseph's (IN))

Assistant coach(es)

- Joy Cheek (Duke)
- Patrick Klein (Ohio State)
- Mark Mitchell (Eastern Kentucky)

Legend

- (C) Team captain
- (S) Suspended
- (I) Ineligible
- (W) Walk-on
- Injured
- Current redshirt

Roster

== Schedule ==
Date time, TV	Rank^{#}	Opponent^{#}	Result	Record	Site (attendance) city, state
Exhibition
11/01/2015*; 2:00 pm	No. 6	Ursuline	W 113–61		Value City Arena (3,824); Columbus, OH
Non-conference regular season
11/13/2015*; 7:00 pm	No. 6	at No. 2 South Carolina	L 80–88	0–1	Colonial Life Arena (16,815); Columbia, SC
11/16/2015*; 5:30 pm, ESPN2	No. 7	No. 1 Connecticut; College Hoops Tip-Off Marathon	L 56–100	0–2	Value City Arena (11,435); Columbus, OH
11/19/2015*; 7:00 pm	No. 7	Belmont	W 84–56	1–2	Value City Arena (3,826); Columbus, OH
11/22/2015*; 2:00 pm	No. 7	Wagner	W 106–47	2–2	St. John Arena (3,803); Columbus, OH
11/27/2015*; 5:15 pm	No. 11	vs. Liberty; South Point Thanksgiving Shootout	W 75–65	3–2	South Point Arena; Enterprise, NV
11/28/2015*; 3:00 pm	No. 11	vs. No. 10 Texas A&M; South Point Thanksgiving Shootout	W 95–80	4–2	South Point Arena; Enterprise, NV
12/02/2015*; 7:00 pm, ESPN3	No. 10	at No. 3 Notre Dame; ACC–Big Ten Women's Challenge	L 72–75	4–3	Edmund P. Joyce Center (8,609); South Bend, IN
12/06/2015*; 1:00 pm, CBSSN	No. 10	at Cincinnati	W 105–76	5–3	Fifth Third Arena (1,767); Cincinnati, OH
12/13/2015*; 2:00 pm	No. 10	North Carolina A&T	W 89–56	6–3	Value City Arena (4,577); Columbus, OH
12/18/2015*; 7:00 pm	No. 10	Princeton	W 90–70	7–3	Value City Arena (4,639); Columbus, OH
12/21/2015*; 7:00 pm	No. 9	Virginia	W 93–73	8–3	Value City Arena (4,778); Columbus, OH
Big Ten regular season
12/31/2015; 12:00 pm, BTN	No. 9	No. 24 Michigan State	W 85–80	9–3 (1–0)	Value City Arena (5,631); Columbus, OH
01/02/2016; 12:00 pm, CBS	No. 9	at No. 6 Maryland	W 80–71	10–3 (2–0)	Xfinity Center (10,119); College Park, MD
01/07/2016; 7:00 pm	No. 5	Indiana	W 97–70	11–3 (3–0)	Value City Arena (4,420); Columbus, OH
01/10/2016; 2:00 pm	No. 5	Rutgers	W 90–78	12–3 (4–0)	Value City Arena (6,081); Columbus, OH
01/14/2016; 8:00 pm, BTN	No. 5	at Northwestern	L 82–86	12–4 (4–1)	Welsh-Ryan Arena (852); Evanston, IL
01/17/2016; 2:00 pm, BTN	No. 5	Purdue	W 90–70	13–4 (5–1)	Value City Arena (7,418); Columbus, OH
01/21/2016; 6:00 pm, BTN	No. 7	at Michigan; Rivalry	W 97–93	14–4 (6–1)	Crisler Center (2,093); Ann Arbor, MI
01/24/2016; 3:00 pm, ESPN2	No. 7	at Rutgers	W 67–58	15–4 (7–1)	Louis Brown Athletic Center (1,510); Piscataway, NJ
01/28/2016; 7:00 pm, BTN	No. 7	Northwestern	W 76–73	16–4 (8–1)	Value City Arena (4,606); Columbus, OH
02/01/2016; 7:00 pm, BTN	No. 7	at Illinois	W 80–70	17–4 (9–1)	State Farm Center (1,517); Champaign, IL
02/04/2016; 7:00 pm	No. 7	Wisconsin	W 87–61	18–4 (10–1)	Value City Arena (4,267); Columbus, OH
02/08/2016; 9:00 pm, ESPN2	No. 7	No. 5 Maryland	W 94–86	19–4 (11–1)	Value City Arena (4,911); Columbus, OH
02/11/2016; 8:30 pm, BTN	No. 7	Iowa	W 98–81	20–4 (12–1)	Value City Arena (3,667); Columbus, OH
02/14/2016; 2:00 pm, BTN	No. 7	at Penn State	W 77–63	21–4 (13–1)	Bryce Jordan Center; University Park, PA
02/18/2016; 6:00 pm, BTN	No. 5	Nebraska	W 96–70	22–4 (14–1)	Value City Arena (5,243); Columbus, OH
02/21/2016; 2:00 pm	No. 5	Illinois	W 117–74	23–4 (15–1)	Value City Arena (8,247); Columbus, OH
02/24/2016; 8:00 pm	No. 5	at Minnesota	L 88–90 ^{OT}	23–5 (15–2)	Williams Arena (6,434); Minneapolis, MN
02/27/2016; 2:00 pm, BTN	No. 5	at No. 20 Michigan State	L 105–107 ^{3OT}	23–6 (15–3)	Breslin Center (8,631); East Lansing, MI
Big Ten Women's Tournament
03/04/2016; 6:30 pm, BTN	(2) No. 9	vs. (10) Rutgers; Quarterfinals	W 73–58	24–6	Bankers Life Fieldhouse; Indianapolis, IN
03/05/2016; 5:30 pm, BTN	(2) No. 9	vs. (3) No. 19 Michigan State; Semifinals	L 63–82	24–7	Bankers Life Fieldhouse; Indianapolis, IN
NCAA Women's Tournament
03/18/2016*; 2:30 pm, ESPN2	(3 SF) No. 9	vs. (14 SF) Buffalo; First Round	W 88–69	25–7	St. John Arena (2,626); Columbus, OH
03/20/2016*; 12:00 pm, ESPN2	(3 SF) No. 9	vs. (6 SF) No. 23 West Virginia; Second Round	W 88–81	26–7	St. John Arena (2,558); Columbus, OH
03/25/2016*; 9:30 pm, ESPN2	(3 SF) No. 9	vs. (7 SF) Tennessee; Sweet Sixteen	L 62–78	26–8	Denny Sanford Premier Center (4,610); Sioux Falls, SD
*Non-conference game. ^{#}Rankings from AP Poll. (#) Tournament seedings in parentheses. SF=Sioux Falls Region. All times are in Eastern Time.

== Rankings ==
Regular season polls
Poll	Pre- season	Week 2	Week 3	Week 4	Week 5	Week 6	Week 7	Week 8	Week 9	Week 10	Week 11	Week 12	Week 13	Week 14	Week 15	Week 16	Week 17	Week 18	Week 19	Final
AP	6	7	11	10	10	10	9	9	5	5	7	7	7	7	5	5	9	9	9	N/A
Coaches	10	14т	14	12	13	12	10	9	5	5	7	7	7	6	5	5	9	9	9	10

Legend
	Increase in ranking
	Decrease in ranking
	Not ranked previous week
(RV)	Received votes

== See also ==
- 2015–16 Ohio State Buckeyes men's basketball team
