= 2015–16 Nebraska Cornhuskers women's basketball team =

Intercollegiate basketball season

2015–16 Nebraska Cornhuskers women's basketball

WNIT, First Round
- Conference: Big Ten Conference
- Record: 18–13 (9–9 B1G)
- Head coach: Connie Yori (14th season)
- Assistant coaches: Britney Brown; Ashley Ford; Amy Stephens
- Home arena: Pinnacle Bank Arena

2015–16 Big Ten women's basketball standings
	Conf.				Overall
Team	W		L	PCT	W		L	PCT
No. 5 Maryland†	16	–	2	.889	31	–	4	.886
No. 9 Ohio State	15	–	3	.833	26	–	8	.765
No. 16 Michigan State	13	–	5	.722	25	–	9	.735
Indiana	12	–	6	.667	21	–	12	.636
Minnesota	11	–	7	.611	20	–	12	.625
Purdue	10	–	8	.556	20	–	12	.625
Michigan	9	–	9	.500	21	–	14	.600
Nebraska	9	–	9	.500	18	–	13	.581
Iowa	8	–	10	.444	19	–	14	.576
Rutgers	8	–	10	.444	19	–	15	.559
Penn State	6	–	12	.333	12	–	19	.387
Northwestern	4	–	14	.222	18	–	17	.514
Wisconsin	3	–	15	.167	7	–	22	.241
Illinois	2	–	16	.111	9	–	21	.300
† 2016 Big Ten tournament winner As of March 31, 2016; Rankings from AP poll

The 2015–16 Nebraska Cornhuskers women's basketball team represented University of Nebraska–Lincoln during the 2015–16 NCAA Division I women's basketball season. The Cornhuskers, led by 14th year head coach Connie Yori, played their home games at Pinnacle Bank Arena and were members of the Big Ten Conference. They finished the season 18–13, 9–9 in Big Ten play to finish in a tie for seventh place. They lost in the second round of the Big Ten women's tournament to Rutgers. They were invited to the Women's National Invitation Tournament, where they lost to Northern Iowa in the first round.

On April 5, 2016, Connie Yori resigned following an alleged investigation into how she treated her players. She finished at Nebraska with a 14-year record of 280–166.

== Roster ==
2015–16 Nebraska Cornhuskers women's basketball team
Players
Coaches

Pos.	#	Name	Height	Year	Previous school	Hometown
G	4	Kyndal Clark	5 ft 7 in (1.7 m)	Sr	Drake; Webb City	Webb City, MO
G	5	Natalie Romeo	5 ft 7 in (1.7 m)	So	Carondelet	Martinez, CA
G	11	Esther Ramacieri	5 ft 8 in (1.73 m)	Jr	Dawson College; Felix Leclerc	Repentigny, QE, CAN
G	12	Emily Wood	5 ft 5 in (1.65 m)	So	Salina Central	Salina, KS
F	22	Allie Havers	6 ft 5 in (1.96 m)	Jr	Mattawan	Paw Paw, MI
G	24	Maddie Simon	6 ft 2 in (1.88 m)	Fr	Pius X	Lincoln, NE
F	31	Anya Kalenta	6 ft 3 in (1.91 m)	Sr	Vincennes/Broward College; General Secondary #21	Minsk, Belarus
F	32	Jessica Shepard	6 ft 4 in (1.93 m)	Fr	Fremont	Fremont, NE
G	33	Rachel Theriot	6 ft 0 in (1.83 m)	Sr	Midpark	Middleburg Heights, OH
G	34	Jasmine Cincore	5 ft 8 in (1.73 m)	So	Briarcrest Christian School	Arlington, TN
F	43	Rachel Blackburn	6 ft 3 in (1.91 m)	Fr	Leavenworth	Leavenworth, KS
C	50	Darrien Washington	6 ft 2 in (1.88 m)	RS Fr	Skyline	Oakland, CA
F	52	Alicia Ostrander	6 ft 3 in (1.91 m)	Sr	Gordon-Rushville	Gordon, NE

Head coach

Connie Yori (Creighton)

Assistant coach(es)

Britney Brown (Oklahoma)
Ashley Ford (Nebraska)
Amy Stephens(Nebraska)

Legend

- (C) Team captain
- (S) Suspended
- (I) Ineligible
- (W) Walk-on
- Injured
- Current redshirt

Roster

== Schedule ==
Date time, TV	Rank^{#}	Opponent^{#}	Result	Record	Site (attendance) city, state
Exhibition
08/04/2015*; 5:00 am		at Frankston Lady Blues	L 72–81		Frankston Basketball Centre; Frankston, Australia
08/05/2015*; 3:30 am		at Dandenong Rangers	L 41–72		Dandenong Stadium; Melbourne, Australia
08/06/2015*; 4:30 am		at Cairns Dolphins	L 73–79		Cairns Basketball Stadium; Cairns, Australia
08/10/2015*		at Sydney Heat	W 76–56		Sydney, Australia
11/01/2015*; 2:00 pm		Nebraska–Kearney	W 92–54		Pinnacle Bank Arena (4,900); Lincoln, NE
11/08/2015*; 2:00 pm		Winona State	W 96–66		Pinnacle Bank Arena (4,926); Lincoln, NE
Non-conference regular season
11/14/2015*; 11:30 am		Arkansas–Pine Bluff	W 96–46	1–0	Pinnacle Bank Arena (4,953); Lincoln, NE
11/16/2015*; 7:00 pm		North Florida	W 91–46	2–0	Pinnacle Bank Arena (4,475); Lincoln, NE
11/21/2015*; 2:00 pm		North Carolina Central	W 88–47	3–0	Pinnacle Bank Arena (4,984); Lincoln, NE
11/23/2015*; 7:00 pm		Southern	W 89–38	4–0	Pinnacle Bank Arena (4,748); Lincoln, NE
11/28/2015*; 12:00 pm, SNY/ESPN3		at No. 1 Connecticut	L 46–88	4–1	XL Center (10,113); Hartford, CT
12/03/2015*; 7:00 pm		NC State; ACC–Big Ten Women's Challenge	W 88–67	5–1	Pinnacle Bank Arena (5,151); Lincoln, NE
12/06/2015*; 2:00 pm		Creighton	W 65–63	6–1	Pinnacle Bank Arena (6,056); Lincoln, NE
12/08/2015*; 7:00 pm		Evansville	W 85–40	7–1	Pinnacle Bank Arena (4,614); Lincoln, NE
12/12/2015*; 7:00 pm, P12N		at No. 22 California	L 80–87 ^{OT}	7–2	Haas Pavilion (4,406); Berkeley, CA
12/19/2015*; 4:00 pm		Northern Arizona	W 90–67	8–2	Pinnacle Bank Arena (4,775); Lincoln, NE
12/21/2015*; 7:00 pm		Arkansas State	W 79–71	9–2	Pinnacle Bank Arena (4,991); Lincoln, NE
Big Ten regular season
12/31/2015; 1:00 pm		Iowa	L 68–74	9–3 (0–1)	Pinnacle Bank Arena (7,329); Lincoln, NE
01/03/2016; 1:30 pm, BTN		at No. 14 Northwestern	L 62–85	9–4 (0–2)	Welsh-Ryan Arena (1,249); Evanston, IL
01/07/2016; 6:00 pm, BTN		at No. 8 Maryland	L 50–89	9–5 (0–3)	Xfinity Center (4,112); College Park, MD
01/10/2016; 2:00 pm		Illinois	W 73–57	10–5 (1–3)	Pinnacle Bank Arena (6,222); Lincoln, NE
01/13/2016; 6:00 pm		at Penn State	W 83–78	11–5 (2–3)	Bryce Jordan Center (2,745); University Park, PA
01/16/2016; 5:30 pm, BTN		Rutgers	W 65–54	12–5 (3–3)	Pinnacle Bank Arena (5,622); Lincoln, NE
01/20/2016; 6:00 pm		at Purdue	W 62–61	13–5 (4–3)	Mackey Arena (6,041); West Lafayette, IN
01/24/2016; 1:00 pm		at Michigan	W 93–81	14–5 (5–3)	Crisler Center (3,082); Ann Arbor, MI
01/27/2016; 7:00 pm		Wisconsin	W 75–62	15–5 (6–3)	Pinnacle Bank Arena (5,349); Lincoln, NE
01/30/2016; 1:00 pm		at Rutgers	L 56–66	15–6 (6–4)	Louis Brown Athletic Center (2,815); Piscataway, NJ
02/02/2016; 7:00 pm, BTN		Penn State	W 87–69	16–6 (7–4)	Pinnacle Bank Arena (4,486); Lincoln, NE
02/07/2016; 1:00 pm		at Indiana	L 47–59	16–7 (7–5)	Assembly Hall (3,370); Bloomington, IN
02/11/2016; 7:00 pm		at Minnesota	L 73–110	16–8 (7–6)	Williams Arena (3,945); Minneapolis, MN
02/14/2016; 3:00 pm, BTN		No. 17 Michigan State	W 73–66	17–8 (8–6)	Pinnacle Bank Arena (8,338); Lincoln, NE
02/18/2016; 5:00 pm, BTN		at No. 5 Ohio State	L 70–96	17–9 (8–7)	Value City Arena (5,243); Columbus, OH
02/21/2016; 2:00 pm, BTN		Purdue	L 50–68	17–10 (8–8)	Pinnacle Bank Arena (5,671); Lincoln, NE
02/24/2016; 7:00 pm		Indiana	L 68–79	17–11 (8–9)	Pinnacle Bank Arena (5,376); Lincoln, NE
02/28/2016; 3:00 pm, BTN		Northwestern	W 76–67	18–11 (9–9)	Pinnacle Bank Arena (6,596); Lincoln, NE
Big Ten Women's Tournament
03/03/2016; 5:30 pm, BTN		vs. Rutgers; Second Round	L 63–66	18–12	Bankers Life Fieldhouse; Indianapolis, IN
WNIT
03/17/2016*; 7:00 pm		Northern Iowa; First Round	L 62–64	18–13	Pinnacle Bank Arena (2,942); Lincoln, NE
*Non-conference game. ^{#}Rankings from AP Poll. (#) Tournament seedings in parentheses. All times are in Central Time.

== Rankings ==
2015–16 NCAA Division I women's basketball rankings

Regular season polls
Poll	Pre- Season	Week 2	Week 3	Week 4	Week 5	Week 6	Week 7	Week 8	Week 9	Week 10	Week 11	Week 12	Week 13	Week 14	Week 15	Week 16	Week 17	Week 18	Week 19	Final
AP	NR	NR	RV	RV	RV	RV	RV	RV	NR	NR	NR	NR	NR	NR	NR	NR	NR	NR	NR	N/A
Coaches	RV	RV	RV	RV	RV	RV	RV	RV	NR	NR	NR	NR	NR	NR	NR	NR	NR	NR	NR	NR

Legend
	Increase in ranking
	Decrease in ranking
	Not ranked previous week
(RV)	Received Votes

== See also ==
2015–16 Nebraska Cornhuskers men's basketball team
