= 2015–16 Maryland Terrapins women's basketball team =

Intercollegiate basketball season

2015–16 Maryland Terrapins women's basketball
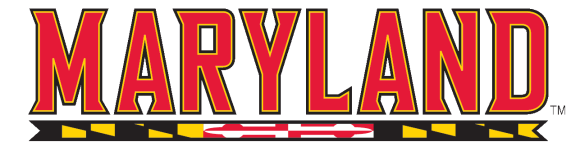

Paradise Jam Reef Division Champions Big Ten Regular Season & Tournament Champions

NCAA women's tournament, second round
- Conference: Big Ten Conference

Ranking
- Coaches: No. 9
- AP: No. 5
- Record: 31–4 (16–2 Big Ten)
- Head coach: Brenda Frese (14th season)
- Assistant coaches: Shay Robinson; Bett Shelby; Terry Nooner
- Home arena: Xfinity Center

2015–16 Big Ten women's basketball standings
	Conf.				Overall
Team	W		L	PCT	W		L	PCT
No. 5 Maryland†	16	–	2	.889	31	–	4	.886
No. 9 Ohio State	15	–	3	.833	26	–	8	.765
No. 16 Michigan State	13	–	5	.722	25	–	9	.735
Indiana	12	–	6	.667	21	–	12	.636
Minnesota	11	–	7	.611	20	–	12	.625
Purdue	10	–	8	.556	20	–	12	.625
Michigan	9	–	9	.500	21	–	14	.600
Nebraska	9	–	9	.500	18	–	13	.581
Iowa	8	–	10	.444	19	–	14	.576
Rutgers	8	–	10	.444	19	–	15	.559
Penn State	6	–	12	.333	12	–	19	.387
Northwestern	4	–	14	.222	18	–	17	.514
Wisconsin	3	–	15	.167	7	–	22	.241
Illinois	2	–	16	.111	9	–	21	.300
† 2016 Big Ten tournament winner As of March 31, 2016; Rankings from AP poll

The 2015–16 Maryland Terrapins women's basketball team represented the University of Maryland, College Park in 2015–16 NCAA Division I women's basketball season. The Terrapins, led by fourteenth-year head coach Brenda Frese, played their home games at the Xfinity Center. They were second-year members of the Big Ten Conference. They finished the season 31–4, 16–2 in Big Ten play to win their second straight Big Ten regular season title. They were also champions of the Big Ten Women's tournament for the second straight year, and received an automatic bid to the NCAA women's basketball tournament, where they defeated Iona in the first round before being upset by Washington in the second round.

== Roster ==
2015–16 Maryland Terrapins women's basketball team
Players
Coaches

Pos.	#	Name	Height	Year	Previous school	Hometown
F	0	Aja Ellison	6 ft 3 in (1.91 m)	So	Life Center Academy	Burlington, OH
F	1	Kiah Gillespie	6 ft 2 in (1.88 m)	Fr	Capital Prep Magnet	Meriden, CT
G	2	Kiara Leslie	5 ft 11 in (1.8 m)	So	Solon	Holly Springs, NC
G	3	Brene Moseley	5 ft 7 in (1.7 m)	RS Sr	Paint Branch	Burtonsville, MD
C	5	Malina Howard	6 ft 4 in (1.93 m)	Sr	Twinsburg	Twinsburg, OH
G	12	Kristen Confroy	5 ft 8 in (1.73 m)	So	Holly Springs	Solo, OH
G	15	Chloe Pavlech	5 ft 9 in (1.75 m)	Sr	Sycamore	Cincinnati, OH
F	22	Tierney Pfirman	6 ft 2 in (1.88 m)	Sr	South Williamsport Junior Senior	Williamsport, PA
G	24	Ieshia Small	6 ft 0 in (1.83 m)	Jr	Florida State Univ. HS; Baylor	Miami, FL
F	32	Shatori Walker-Kimbrough	5 ft 11 in (1.8 m)	Jr	Hopewell	Aliquippa, PA
F	34	Brianna Fraser	6 ft 3 in (1.91 m)	Fr	South Shore	Brooklyn, NY
C	42	Brionna Jones	6 ft 3 in (1.91 m)	Jr	Aberdeen	Havre de Grace, MD

Head coach

- Brenda Frese (Arizona)

Assistant coach(es)

- Shay Robinson (Central Florida)
- Bett Shelby (Greensboro)
- Terry Nooner (Kansas)

Legend

- (C) Team captain
- (S) Suspended
- (I) Ineligible
- (W) Walk-on
- Injured
- Current redshirt

Roster

== Big Ten Championship ==
Maryland and Michigan State met in the championship game of the Big Ten tournament. Michigan State ended the first quarter with a small two-point lead, and retained the lead at the half. In the third quarter, the Terrapins went on an 11–0 run to take a lead they would not relinquish. Maryland ended up with a win 60–44, to win the Big Ten championship for the second consecutive year. Shatori Walker-Kimbrough was named the Big Ten tournament most outstanding player.

== Schedule ==
Date time, TV	Rank^{#}	Opponent^{#}	Result	Record	Site (attendance) city, state
Exhibition
10/31/2015*; 1:00 pm	No. 9	Goldey–Beacom	W 127–33		Xfinity Center (2,598); College Park, MD
11/04/2015*; 7:00 pm	No. 9	Indiana (PA)	W 101–56		Xfinity Center (2,614); College Park, MD
Non-conference regular season
11/14/2015*; 2:00 pm	No. 9	UMass Lowell	W 102–53	1–0	Xfinity Center (3,956); College Park, MD
11/18/2015*; 7:00 pm	No. 8	High Point	W 105–50	2–0	Xfinity Center (3,574); College Park, MD
11/20/2015*; 11:00 am	No. 8	Detroit	W 97–41	3–0	Xfinity Center (5,551); College Park, MD
11/26/2015*; 5:45 pm	No. 6	vs. Old Dominion; Paradise Jam tournament Reef Division	W 95–49	4–0	Sports and Fitness Center (N/A); Saint Thomas, USVI
11/27/2015*; 5:45 pm	No. 6	vs. South Dakota State; Paradise Jam Tournament Reef Division	W 62–55	5–0	Sports and Fitness Center (N/A); Saint Thomas, USVI
11/28/2015*; 8:00 pm	No. 6	vs. Pittsburgh; Paradise Jam Tournament Reef Division	W 70–49	6–0	Sports and Fitness Center (1,749); Saint Thomas, USVI
12/02/2015*; 7:00 pm, BTN	No. 5	No. 20 Syracuse; ACC–Big Ten Women's Challenge	W 82–64	7–0	Xfinity Center (3,964); College Park, MD
12/05/2015*; 2:00 pm	No. 5	Central Connecticut	W 86–43	8–0	Xfinity Center (3,713); College Park, MD
12/08/2015*; 7:00 pm	No. 5	Loyola (MD)	W 97–47	9–0	Xfinity Center (3,368); College Park, MD
12/11/2015*; 7:00 pm	No. 5	Southern	W 94–61	10–0	Xfinity Center (3,660); College Park, MD
12/20/2015*; 1:00 pm	No. 5	at Maryland Eastern Shore	W 106–30	11–0	Hytche Athletic Center (839); Princess Anne, MD
12/28/2015*; 8:30 pm, ESPN2	No. 6	vs. No. 1 Connecticut; Maggie Dixon Classic	L 73–83	11–1	Madison Square Garden (6,575); New York City, NY
Big Ten regular season
12/31/2015; 3:00 pm	No. 6	at Illinois	W 79–63	12–1 (1–0)	State Farm Center (1,716); Champaign, IL
01/02/2016; 12:00 pm, CBS	No. 6	No. 9 Ohio State	L 71–80	12–2 (1–1)	Xfinity Center (10,119); College Park, MD
01/07/2016; 7:00 pm, BTN	No. 8	Nebraska	W 89–50	13–2 (2–1)	Xfinity Center (4,112); College Park, MD
01/10/2016; 3:00 pm, ESPN2	No. 8	at Iowa	W 76–56	14–2 (3–1)	Carver–Hawkeye Arena (7,776); Iowa City, IA
01/14/2016; 6:00 pm, BTN	No. 8	at Michigan	W 74–67	15–2 (4–1)	Crisler Center (1,752); Ann Arbor, MI
01/17/2016; 12:00 pm, BTN	No. 8	Northwestern	W 80–62	16–2 (5–1)	Xfinity Center (6,037); College Park, MD
01/20/2016; 8:00 pm	No. 5	at Wisconsin	W 90–65	17–2 (6–1)	Kohl Center (2,954); Madison, WI
01/27/2016; 7:00 pm	No. 5	at Penn State	W 89–53	18–2 (7–1)	Bryce Jordan Center (3,052); University Park, PA
01/30/2016; 2:00 pm	No. 5	Indiana	W 86–63	19–2 (8–1)	Xfinity Center (6,230); College Park, MD
02/02/2016; 6:00 pm, BTN	No. 5	at Purdue	W 87–67	20–2 (9–1)	Mackey Arena (6,024); West Lafayette, IN
02/05/2016; 7:00 pm	No. 5	No. 18 Michigan State	W 85–76	21–2 (10–1)	Xfinity Center (5,738); College Park, MD
02/08/2016; 9:00 pm, ESPN2	No. 5	at No. 7 Ohio State	L 86–94	21–3 (10–2)	Value City Arena (4,911); Columbus, OH
02/11/2016; 7:00 pm	No. 5	at Purdue	W 73–59	22–3 (11–2)	Xfinity Center (3,646); College Park, MD
02/14/2016; 4:00 pm, ESPN2	No. 5	at Northwestern	W 79–70	23–3 (12–2)	Welsh-Ryan Arena (1,792); Evanston, IL
02/17/2016; 7:00 pm	No. 6	Michigan	W 76–56	24–3 (13–2)	Xfinity Center (5,100); College Park, MD
02/21/2016; 3:00 pm, ESPN2	No. 6	at Rutgers	W 73–59	25–3 (14–2)	Louis Brown Athletic Center (3,755); Piscataway, NJ
02/25/2016; 6:30 pm	No. 6	Wisconsin	W 83–77	26–3 (15–2)	Xfinity Center (4,147); College Park, MD
02/28/2016; 5:00 pm, ESPN2	No. 6	Minnesota	W 110–77	27–3 (16–2)	Xfinity Center (11,428); College Park, MD
Big Ten Women's tournament
03/04/2016; 12:00 pm, BTN	No. 5 (1)	vs. (9) Iowa; Quarterfinals	W 75–55	28–3	Bankers Life Fieldhouse; Indianapolis, IN
03/05/2016; 3:00 pm, BTN	No. 5 (1)	vs. (12) Northwestern; Semifinals	W 83–62	29–3	Bankers Life Fieldhouse; Indianapolis, IN
03/06/2016; 7:00 pm, ESPN	No. 5 (1)	vs. No. 19 (3) Michigan State; Championship Game	W 60–44	30–3	Bankers Life Fieldhouse (5,109); Indianapolis, IN
NCAA Women's tournament
03/19/2016*; 1:30 pm, ESPN2	No. 5 (2 Lex)	(15 Lex) Iona; First Round	W 74–58	31–3	Xfinity Center (5,374); College Park, MD
03/21/2016*; 6:30 pm, ESPN2	No. 5 (2 Lex)	(7 Lex) Washington; Second Round	L 65–74	31–4	Xfinity Center (4,396); College Park, MD
*Non-conference game. ^{#}Rankings from AP Poll. (#) Tournament seedings in parentheses. Lex=Lexington Region. All times are in Eastern Time.

== Rankings ==
Regular season polls
Poll	Pre- season	Week 2	Week 3	Week 4	Week 5	Week 6	Week 7	Week 8	Week 9	Week 10	Week 11	Week 12	Week 13	Week 14	Week 15	Week 16	Week 17	Week 18	Week 19	Final
AP	9	8	6	5	5т	5	6	6	8	8	5	5	5	5	6	6	5	5	5	N/A
Coaches	6	8	6	5	5	5	5	5	8	8	5	5	5	7	6	6	5	5	5	9

Legend
	Increase in ranking
	Decrease in ranking
	Not ranked previous week
(RV)	Received votes

== See also ==
- 2015–16 Maryland Terrapins men's basketball team
