= 2015–16 Indiana Hoosiers women's basketball team =

Intercollegiate basketball season

2015–16 Indiana Hoosiers women's basketball

NCAA Women's Tournament, second round
- Conference: Big Ten Conference
- Record: 21–12 (12–6 Big Ten)
- Head coach: Teri Moren (2nd season)
- Assistant coaches: Curtis Loyd; Todd Starkey; Rhet Wierzba
- Home arena: Assembly Hall

2015–16 Big Ten women's basketball standings
	Conf.				Overall
Team	W		L	PCT	W		L	PCT
No. 5 Maryland†	16	–	2	.889	31	–	4	.886
No. 9 Ohio State	15	–	3	.833	26	–	8	.765
No. 16 Michigan State	13	–	5	.722	25	–	9	.735
Indiana	12	–	6	.667	21	–	12	.636
Minnesota	11	–	7	.611	20	–	12	.625
Purdue	10	–	8	.556	20	–	12	.625
Michigan	9	–	9	.500	21	–	14	.600
Nebraska	9	–	9	.500	18	–	13	.581
Iowa	8	–	10	.444	19	–	14	.576
Rutgers	8	–	10	.444	19	–	15	.559
Penn State	6	–	12	.333	12	–	19	.387
Northwestern	4	–	14	.222	18	–	17	.514
Wisconsin	3	–	15	.167	7	–	22	.241
Illinois	2	–	16	.111	9	–	21	.300
† 2016 Big Ten tournament winner As of March 31, 2016; Rankings from AP poll

The 2015–16 Indiana Hoosiers women's basketball team represented Indiana University Bloomington during the 2015–16 NCAA Division I women's basketball season. The Hoosiers, led by second year head coach Teri Moren, play their home games at the Assembly Hall and are members of the Big Ten Conference. They finished the season 21–12, 12–6 in Big Ten play to finish in fourth place. They lost in the quarterfinals of the Big Ten women's tournament to Northwestern. They received an at-large bid to the NCAA women's basketball tournament, which was their first trip since 2002. They defeated Georgia in the first round before losing to Notre Dame in the second round.

== Roster ==
2015–16 Indiana Hoosiers women's basketball team
Players
Coaches

Pos.	#	Name	Height	Year	Previous school	Hometown
G	2	Jess Walter	5 ft 11 in (1.8 m)	So	Midland	Midland, MI
G	3	Tyra Buss	5 ft 7 in (1.7 m)	So	Mount Carmel	Mount Carmel, IL
G	5	Victoria Kemokai	5 ft 8 in (1.73 m)	Jr	Bush; Tyler JC	Houston, TX
F	11	Kym Royster	6 ft 2 in (1.88 m)	Fr	Newark	Newark, OH
G	21	Karlee McBride	5 ft 10 in (1.78 m)	Jr	Villa Maria	Erie, PA
G	22	Tia Elbert	5 ft 7 in (1.7 m)	So	Tartan; Marquette	Oakdale, MN
G	23	Alexis Gassion	5 ft 11 in (1.8 m)	Jr	Fairborn	Fairborn, OH
G	24	Tyshee Towner	5 ft 9 in (1.75 m)	Jr	East Aurora; Wabash Valley College	Aurora, IL
G	32	Laken Wairau	5 ft 10 in (1.78 m)	Fr	Christchurch Girls'	Christchurch, New Zealand
F	33	Amanda Cahill	6 ft 2 in (1.88 m)	So	Clyde	Clyde, OH
F	40	Lyndsay Leikem	6 ft 1 in (1.85 m)	Sr	Flowing Wells	Tucson, AZ
C	43	Jenn Anderson	6 ft 3 in (1.91 m)	Jr	Westfield	Sheridan, IN
C	44	Danielle Williams	6 ft 4 in (1.93 m)	Fr	North Crowley	Fort Worth, TX

Head coach

- Teri Moren (Purdue)

Assistant coach(es)

- Curtis Loyd (Southern Utah)
- Todd Starkey (Montreat College)
- Rhet Wierzba (Austin Peay)

Legend

- (C) Team captain
- (S) Suspended
- (I) Ineligible
- (W) Walk-on
- Injured
- Current redshirt

Roster

== Schedule ==
Date time, TV	Rank^{#}	Opponent^{#}	Result	Record	Site (attendance) city, state
Exhibition
11/08/2015*; 2:00 pm		Slippery Rock	W 98–33		Assembly Hall; Bloomington, IN
Non-conference regular season
11/13/2015*; 12:00 pm		Tennessee State; Preseason WNIT first round	W 88–56	1–0	Assembly Hall (1,874); Bloomington, IN
11/17/2015*; 7:00 pm		No. 24 Chattanooga; Preseason WNIT Second Round	W 54–43	2–0	Assembly Hall (1,960); Bloomington, IN
11/19/2015*; 8:00 pm		at DePaul; Preseason WNIT Semifinals	L 69–84	2–1	McGrath-Phillips Arena (1,924); Chicago, IL
11/24/2015*; 7:00 pm		at IPFW	W 79–72	3–1	Hilliard Gates Sports Center (954); Fort Wayne, IN
11/27/2015*; 3:30 pm		vs. Ohio; Thanksgiving Tournament semifinals	L 56–63	3–2	Memorial Gymansium (2,447); Nashville, TN
11/28/2015*; 1:00 pm		vs. Austin Peay; Thanksgiving Tournament 3rd place game	W 90–58	4–2	Memorial Gymansium; Nashville, TN
12/02/2015*; 7:00 pm		Georgia Tech; ACC–Big Ten Women's Challenge	W 69–60	5–2	Assembly Hall (2,222); Bloomington, IN
12/08/2015*; 7:05 pm, ESPN3		at Indiana State	W 53–50	6–2	Hulman Center (2,340); Terre Haute, IN
12/11/2015*; 7:00 pm		Samford	W 65–56 ^{OT}	7–2	Assembly Hall (3,088); Bloomington, IN
12/20/2015*; 7:15 pm		vs. No. 23 Miami (FL); Florida Sunshine Classic	L 75–89	7–3	Worden Arena (1,367); Winter Haven, FL
12/21/2015*; 7:15 pm		vs. West Virginia; Florida Sunshine Classic	L 65–75	7–4	Worden Arena (573); Winter Haven, FL
12/28/2015*; 7:00 pm		Yale	W 76–60	8–4	Assembly Hall (3,642); Bloomington, IN
Big Ten regular Season
12/31/2015; 3:00 pm		at Wisconsin	L 69–73	8–5 (0–1)	Kohl Center (4,410); Madison, WI
01/03/2016; 12:30 pm, BTN		Michigan	W 77–69 ^{OT}	9–5 (1–1)	Assembly Hall (3,602); Bloomington, IN
01/07/2016; 7:00 pm		at No. 5 Ohio State	L 70–97	9–6 (1–2)	Value City Arena (4,420); Columbus, OH
01/10/2016; 2:00 pm		at Purdue; Rivalry/Crimson and Gold Cup	L 53–63	9–7 (1–3)	Mackey Arena (8,519); West Lafayette, IN
01/13/2016; 7:00 pm		No. 18 Michigan State	W 81–65	10–7 (2–3)	Assembly Hall (2,507); Bloomington, IN
01/17/2016; 3:00 pm		at Minnesota	L 76–78	10–8 (2–4)	Williams Arena (4,337); Minneapolis, MN
01/20/2016; 7:00 pm		Illinois	W 68–66	11–8 (3–4)	Assembly Hall (2,202); Bloomington, IN
01/24/2016; 5:00 pm, BTN		at Northwestern	W 91–84	12–8 (4–4)	Welsh-Ryan Arena (1,642); Evanston, IL
01/27/2016; 7:00 pm		Rutgers	W 64–48	13–8 (5–4)	Assembly Hall (2,496); Bloomington, IN
01/30/2016; 2:00 pm		at No. 5 Maryland	L 63–86	13–9 (5–5)	Xfinity Center (6,230); College Park, MD
02/04/2016; 7:00 pm, BTN		Iowa	W 79–74	14–9 (6–5)	Assembly Hall (2,421); Bloomington, IN
02/07/2016; 2:00 pm		Nebraska	W 59–47	15–9 (7–5)	Assembly Hall (3,370); Bloomington, IN
02/10/2016; 8:00 pm		at Illinois	W 80–69	16–9 (8–5)	State Farm Center (1,622); Champaign, IL
02/14/2016; 2:00 pm		Wisconsin	W 67–57	17–9 (9–5)	Assembly Hall (3,362); Bloomington, IN
02/18/2016; 7:00 pm		Minnesota	W 93–79	18–9 (10–5)	Assembly Hall (2,530); Bloomington, IN
02/21/2016; 3:00 pm		at Iowa	L 73–76	18–10 (10–6)	Carver–Hawkeye Arena (9,838); Iowa City, IA
02/24/2016; 8:00 pm		at Nebraska	W 79–68	19–10 (11–6)	Pinnacle Bank Arena (5,376); Lincoln, NE
02/27/2016; 4:00 pm, BTN		Penn State	W 76–55	20–10 (12–6)	Assembly Hall (5,246); Bloomington, IN
Big Ten Women's Tournament
03/04/2016; 2:30 pm, BTN	(4)	vs. (12) Northwestern; Quarterfinals	L 73–79	20–11	Bankers Life Fieldhouse; Indianapolis, IN
NCAA Women's Tournament
03/19/2016*; 9:00 pm, ESPN2	(9 L)	vs. (8 L) Georgia; First Round	W 62–58	21–11	Edmund P. Joyce Center (6,310); South Bend, IN
03/21/2016*; 6:30 pm, ESPN2	(9 L)	at (1 L) No. 2 Notre Dame; Second Round	L 70–87	21–12	Edmund P. Joyce Center (5,750); South Bend, IN
*Non-conference game. ^{#}Rankings from AP Poll. (#) Tournament seedings in parentheses. L=Lexington Region. All times are in Eastern Time.

== Rankings ==
Ranking movement Legend: ██ Increase in ranking. ██ Decrease in ranking. NR = Not ranked. RV = Received votes.
Poll	Pre	Wk 2	Wk 3	Wk 4	Wk 5	Wk 6	Wk 7	Wk 8	Wk 9	Wk 10	Wk 11	Wk 12	Wk 13	Wk 14	Wk 15	Wk 16	Wk 17	Wk 18	Wk 19	Final
AP	NR	NR	NR	NR	NR	NR	NR	NR	NR	NR	NR	NR	NR	NR	RV	NR	RV	NR	NR	N/A
Coaches	NR	NR	NR	NR	NR	NR	NR	NR	NR	NR	NR	NR	NR	NR	NR	NR	RV	NR	NR	RV

== See also ==
2015–16 Indiana Hoosiers men's basketball team
