= NRHEG High School =

Location
- 306 Ash Ave S New Richland, Minnesota 56072; United States; 43.8916°N 93.4955°W

Information
- Type: Public
- Established: 1992
- Principal: Grant Berg
- Grades: 6–12
- Enrollment: 434 (2023–2024)
- Colors: Black and Red
- Athletics conference: Gopher Conference
- Mascot: Panther
- Website: www.nrheg.k12.mn.us

NRHEG High School is in New Richland, Minnesota, United States. NRHEG stands for New Richland, Hartland, Ellendale, and Geneva, the towns the school district covers.

== About NRHEG ==
NRHEG High School was established in 1992 when the former New Richland-Hartland and Ellendale-Geneva schools combined to form NRHEG. The school prides itself on "providing each student the opportunity to access a comprehensive general education in a positive learning environment." The NRHEG secondary (high school) building holds grades 6–12. The 9-12 student enrollment is about 300, 49% male and 51% female. The district's elementary school, in Ellendale, holds grades K-5.

== Academics ==
NRHEG high school has a 95% graduation rate and 29 full-time teachers. It has performed better than 55% of Minnesota schools on both math and reading standardized tests.

== Athletics ==
NRHEG high school is one of 12 southern Minnesota teams in the Gopher conference. The Panthers participate in boys and girls basketball, cheerleading, boys and girls cross-country, football, boys and girls golf, softball, baseball, track and field, volleyball, wrestling, and co-op with Waseca High School in gymnastics, soccer, and hockey. In 2013–14, NRHEG high school athletics had a very successful year. Three wrestlers made the state wrestling tournament as individuals. The competitive cheerleading squad achieved its second consecutive state title at the MCCA State Cheer Competition. The boys basketball team won the Gopher Conference, which had not been achieved since 1996. The girls basketball team also won the Gopher Conference for the sixth time in a row, and for the second straight year won the Class AA state championship. The girls basketball team made an appearance at state three years in a row, 2012, 2013, and 2014. The clay target shooting team won its conference and, after finishing 3rd at the Class AAA State Championship, qualified for the first ever MSHSL state clay target tournament. This was the first event of its kind in the nation. 2014 was also the year basketball sensation Carlie Wagner graduated. Wagner is the #2 scorer in Minnesota high school basketball history at 3,957 points; she also holds numerous state records in track and field. She finished her collegiate career as the University of Minnesota's 3rd all-time leading scorer. The Minnesota Lynx drafted her in the 2018 WNBA draft.
