= 2016 Big Ten women's basketball tournament =

- 2016 Tournament logo
- Classification: Division I
- Season: 2015–16
- Teams: 14
- Site: Bankers Life Fieldhouse; Indianapolis, IN
- Champions: Maryland (2nd title)
- Winning coach: Brenda Frese (2nd title)
- MVP: Shatori Walker-Kimbrough (Maryland)
- Attendance: 33,837
- Television: Big Ten Network, ESPN

2015–16 Big Ten women's basketball standings
	Conf.				Overall
Team	W		L	PCT	W		L	PCT
No. 5 Maryland†	16	–	2	.889	31	–	4	.886
No. 9 Ohio State	15	–	3	.833	26	–	8	.765
No. 16 Michigan State	13	–	5	.722	25	–	9	.735
Indiana	12	–	6	.667	21	–	12	.636
Minnesota	11	–	7	.611	20	–	12	.625
Purdue	10	–	8	.556	20	–	12	.625
Michigan	9	–	9	.500	21	–	14	.600
Nebraska	9	–	9	.500	18	–	13	.581
Iowa	8	–	10	.444	19	–	14	.576
Rutgers	8	–	10	.444	19	–	15	.559
Penn State	6	–	12	.333	12	–	19	.387
Northwestern	4	–	14	.222	18	–	17	.514
Wisconsin	3	–	15	.167	7	–	22	.241
Illinois	2	–	16	.111	9	–	21	.300
† 2016 Big Ten tournament winner As of March 31, 2016; Rankings from AP poll

The 2016 Big Ten women's basketball tournament was a postseason tournament was held from March 2–6, 2016 at Bankers Life Fieldhouse in Indianapolis. Maryland won their 2nd Big Ten Women's Tournament and earn an automatic trip to the NCAA women's basketball tournament.

== Seeds ==
All 14 Big Ten schools participate in the tournament. Teams were seeded by 2015–16 Big Ten Conference season record. The top 10 teams received a first-round bye and the top 4 teams received a double bye.

Seeding for the tournament was determined at the close of the regular conference season:

Seed	School	Conf	Tiebreak 1	Tiebreak 2
#1	Maryland	16–2		
#2	Ohio State	15–3		
#3	Michigan State	13–5		
#4	Indiana	12–6		
#5	Minnesota	11–7		
#6	Purdue	10–8		
#7	Nebraska	9–9	1–0 vs. Michigan	
#8	Michigan	9–9	0–1 vs. Nebraska	
#9	Iowa	8–10	1–0 vs. Rutgers	
#10	Rutgers	8–10	0–1 vs. Iowa	
#11	Penn State	6–12		
#12	Northwestern	4–14		
#13	Wisconsin	3–15		
#14	Illinois	2–16		

== Schedule ==
Session	Game	Time*	Matchup^{#}	Television	Attendance
First round - Wednesday, March 2
1	1	1:30 pm	#13 Wisconsin vs. #12 Northwestern	BTN	
1	2	4:00 pm	#14 Illinois vs. #11 Penn State	BTN	
Second round - Thursday, March 3
2	3	12:00 pm	#9 Iowa vs. #8 Michigan	BTN	4,783
2	4	2:30 pm	#12 Northwestern vs. #5 Minnesota	BTN	4,783
3	5	6:30 pm	#10 Rutgers vs. #7 Nebraska	BTN	5,011
3	6	9:00 pm	#11 Penn State vs. #6 Purdue	BTN	5,011
Quarterfinals - Friday, March 4
4	7	12:00 pm	#9 Iowa vs. #1 Maryland	BTN	6,606
4	8	2:30 pm	#12 Northwestern vs. #4 Indiana	BTN	6,606
5	9	6:30 pm	#10 Rutgers vs. #2 Ohio State	BTN	6,043
5	10	9:00 pm	#6 Purdue vs. #3 Michigan State	BTN	6,043
Semifinals - Saturday, March 5
6	11	3:00 pm	#1 Maryland vs. #12 Northwestern	BTN	6,285
6	12	5:30 pm	#2 Ohio State vs. #3 Michigan State	BTN	6,285
Championship - Sunday, March 6
7	13	7:00 pm	#1 Maryland vs. #3 Michigan State	ESPN	5,109

*Game times in Eastern Time. #Rankings denote tournament seeding.

== Bracket ==
First round Wednesday, March 2 BTN
12	Northwestern	76^{OT}
13	Wisconsin	72
11	Penn State	75
14	Illinois	66

Second round Thursday, March 3 BTN
8	Michigan	85
9	Iowa	97
5	Minnesota	74
12	Northwestern	84
7	Nebraska	63
10	Rutgers	66
6	Purdue	70
11	Penn State	59

Quarterfinals; Friday, March 4 BTN
1	Maryland	75
9	Iowa	55
4	Indiana	73
12	Northwestern	79
2	Ohio State	73
10	Rutgers	58
3	Michigan State	65
6	Purdue	64

Semifinals; Saturday, March 5 BTN
1	Maryland	83
12	Northwestern	62
2	Ohio State	63
3	Michigan State	82

Championship; Sunday, March 6 ESPN
1	Maryland	60
3	Michigan State	44

== See also ==
- 2016 Big Ten Conference men's basketball tournament
