= 2015–16 Buffalo Bulls women's basketball team =

Intercollegiate basketball season

2015–16 Buffalo Bulls women's basketball

MAC Tournament Champions

NCAA Women's Tournament, first round
- Conference: Mid-American Conference
- East Division
- Record: 20–14 (8–10 MAC)
- Head coach: Felisha Legette-Jack (4th season)
- Assistant coaches: Cherie Cordoba; Ashley Zuber; Kristen Sharkey
- Home arena: Alumni Arena

2015–16 Mid-American Conference women's basketball standings
	Conf.				Overall
Team	W		L	PCT	W		L	PCT
East
Ohio	16	–	2	.889	26	–	7	.788
Akron	11	–	7	.611	19	–	14	.576
Buffalo †	8	–	10	.444	20	–	14	.588
Bowling Green	6	–	12	.333	10	–	18	.357
Miami (OH)	3	–	15	.167	9	–	21	.300
Kent State	3	–	15	.167	6	–	23	.207
West
Central Michigan	14	–	4	.778	22	–	11	.667
Ball State	13	–	5	.722	22	–	10	.688
Toledo	12	–	6	.667	17	–	13	.567
Eastern Michigan	10	–	8	.556	22	–	12	.647
Western Michigan	8	–	10	.444	17	–	15	.531
Northern Illinois	4	–	14	.222	11	–	19	.367
† 2016 MAC tournament winner As of March 24, 2016; Rankings from AP poll

The 2015–16 Buffalo Bulls women's basketball team represented the University at Buffalo during the 2015–16 NCAA Division I women's basketball season. The Bulls, led by fourth year head coach Felisha Legette-Jack, played their home games at Alumni Arena as members of the East Division of the Mid-American Conference. They finished the season 20–14, 8–10 in MAC play to finish in third place in the East Division. They won the MAC women's tournament and earned an automatic trip to the NCAA women's tournament for the first time in school history, where they lost in the first round to Ohio State.

== NCAA invitation ==
Buffalo finished the regular-season tied for seventh in the conference and were assigned the eight seed for the 2016 MAC women's basketball tournament. In the first round game, they beat Bowling Green 64–44, then knocked off the top-seeded Ohio 72–60. After upsetting the fifth seed Akron 88–87 in the semifinals, they face the second-seeded Central Michigan for the tournament championship. This game would be even closer, as it would go to overtime. The game was still tied with 3.4 seconds left in the game. The ball was inbounded to Stephanie Reid who dribbled around a screen and put up a shot that went off the glass, and through the net to win the game 73–71. The win gave Buffalo the first ever championship of the Mid-America Conference and their first ever invitation to the NCAA tournament.

== Roster ==
2015–16 Buffalo Bulls women's basketball team
Players
Coaches

Pos.	#	Name	Height	Year	Previous school	Hometown
G	1	Stephanie Reid	5 ft 6 in (1.68 m)	So	The Peninsula School	Melbourne, Australia
G	2	Camera Miley	5 ft 7 in (1.7 m)	Jr	Midwood	Brooklyn, NY
G	3	Liisa Ups	5 ft 9 in (1.75 m)	So	Smith's Hill	Wollongong, Australia
G	4	Joanna Smith	5 ft 8 in (1.73 m)	Jr	Southaven	Southaven, Mississippi
G	5	Katherine Ups	5 ft 9 in (1.75 m)	So	Smith's Hill	Wollongong, Australia
G	10	Gabi Bade	5 ft 8 in (1.73 m)	Fr	Pinewood School	Milpitas, CA
F	12	Courtney Wilkins	6 ft 1 in (1.85 m)	So	Haileybury College	Melbourne, Australia
F	14	Tamara Brcina	6 ft 2 in (1.88 m)	Fr	Secondary School of Economics and Commerce Tuzla	Tuzla, Bosnia
F	21	Mariah Suchan	6 ft 1 in (1.85 m)	So	Maize South	Wichita, KS
G	22	Ayoleka Sodade	5 ft 9 in (1.75 m)	Fr	Holy Names Catholic	Windsor, ON
C	23	Mirte Scheper	6 ft 4 in (1.93 m)	Fr	Hermann Wesselink College	Amstelveen, Netherlands
G	24	Karin Moss	5 ft 4 in (1.63 m)	RS Sr	Troy	Troy, MI
C	31	Cassie Oursler	6 ft 3 in (1.91 m)	Jr	Grand Island	Grand Island, NY
F	32	Brittany Morrison	5 ft 9 in (1.75 m)	Fr	St. Joseph Academy	North Ridgeville, OH

Head coach

- Felisha Legette-Jack

Assistant coach(es)

- Cherie Cordoba
- Ashley Zuber
- Kristen Sharkey

Legend

- (C) Team captain
- (S) Suspended
- (I) Ineligible
- (W) Walk-on
- Injured
- Current redshirt

Roster
Last update: March 5, 2016

== Schedule ==
Date time, TV	Rank^{#}	Opponent^{#}	Result	Record	Site (attendance) city, state
Exhibition
11/03/2015*; 7:00 pm		Clarion	W 92–62		Alumni Arena; Amherst, NY
11/07/2015*; 2:00 pm		Daemen	W 79–56		Alumni Arena; Amherst, NY
Non-conference regular season
11/14/2015*; 2:00 pm		LIU Brooklyn	W 55–38	1–0	Alumni Arena (827); Amherst, NY
11/17/2015*; 7:00 pm		Canisius	W 55–40	2–0	Alumni Arena (816); Amherst, NY
11/21/2015*; 5:00 pm		at Massachusetts	W 56–48	3–0	Mullins Center (334); Amherst, MA
11/25/2015*; 2:00 pm		Cornell	W 59–41	4–0	Alumni Arena (785); Amherst, NY
11/28/2015*; 2:30 pm		at Central Florida; UCF Thanksgiving Classic	W 66–60	5–0	CFE Arena (273); Orlando, FL
11/29/2015*; 12:00 pm		vs. Clemson; UCF Thanksgiving Classic	W 61–51	6–0	CFE Arena (101); Orlando, FL
12/03/2015*; 7:00 pm		at Hofstra	L 36–79	6–1	Hofstra Arena (157); Hempstead, NY
12/06/2015*; 2:00 pm, ESPN3		Duquesne	L 62–79	6–2	Alumni Arena (832); Amherst, NY
12/09/2015*; 7:00 pm		at St. Bonaventure	L 32–59	6–3	Reilly Center (498); Olean, NY
12/21/2015*; 7:00 pm, TWCSC		at Niagara	W 57–48	7–3	Gallagher Center (320); Lewiston, NY
12/29/2015*; 7:00 pm		at Sacred Heart	W 66–53	8–3	William H. Pitt Center (201); Fairfield, CT
MAC regular season
01/02/2016; 2:30 pm		at Eastern Michigan	L 56–67	8–4 (0–1)	Convocation Center (1,089); Ypsilanti, MI
01/06/2016; 7:00 pm, ESPN3		Central Michigan	W 67–61	9–4 (1–1)	Alumni Arena (875); Amherst, NY
01/09/2016; 2:00 pm		at Kent State	W 77–66	10–4 (2–1)	MAC Center (433); Kent, OH
01/13/2016; 7:00 pm		at Ball State	L 63–68	10–5 (2–2)	John E. Worthen Arena (953); Muncie, IN
01/16/2016; 1:00 pm		Akron	L 61–69	10–6 (2–3)	Alumni Arena (816); Amherst, NY
01/20/2016; 7:00 pm		Western Michigan	L 78–92	10–7 (2–4)	Alumni Arena (851); Amherst, NY
01/23/2016; 2:00 pm		at Miami (OH)	L 58–69	10–8 (2–5)	Millett Hall (350); Oxford, OH
01/30/2016; 2:00 pm		at Northern Illinois	L 74–76	10–9 (2–6)	Convocation Center (407); DeKalb, IL
02/03/2016; 2:00 pm, ESPN3		Ohio	W 51–43	11–9 (3–6)	Alumni Arena (350); Amherst, NY
02/06/2016; 1:00 pm		Ball State	L 57–59	11–10 (3–7)	Alumni Arena (1,618); Amherst, NY
02/10/2016; 7:00 pm, ESPN3		at Toledo	L 60–71	11–11 (3–8)	Savage Arena (3,476); Toledo, OH
02/13/2016; 4:30 pm		at Bowling Green	W 63–50	12–11 (4–8)	Stroh Center (2,513); Bowling Green, OH
02/17/2016; 7:00 pm		Eastern Michigan	L 55–70	12–12 (4–9)	Alumni Arena (954); Amherst, NY
02/20/2016; 2:30 pm		Miami (OH)	W 58–39	13–12 (5–9)	Alumni Arena; Amherst, NY
02/24/2016; 7:00 pm		Bowling Green	W 55–52	14–12 (6–9)	Alumni Arena (824); Amherst, NY
02/27/2016; 1:00 pm		at Ohio	W 70–58	15–12 (7–9)	Convocation Center (3,326); Athens, OH
03/02/2016; 8:00 pm, ASN/ESPN3		at Akron	L 49–62	15–13 (7–10)	James A. Rhodes Arena (529); Akron, OH
03/05/2016; 2:00 pm		Kent State	W 63–47	16–13 (8–10)	Alumni Arena (1,678); Amherst, NY
MAC Women's Tournament
03/07/2016; 5:30 pm, ESPN3		Bowling Green; First Round	W 60–44	17–13	Alumni Arena (807); Amherst, NY
03/09/2016; 12:00 pm, ESPN3		vs. Ohio; Quarterfinals	W 72–60	18–13	Quicken Loans Arena; Cleveland, OH
03/11/2016; 12:00 pm, TWCSOH/BCSN		vs. Akron; Semifinals	W 88–87	19–13	Quicken Loans Arena; Cleveland, OH
03/12/2016; 1:00 pm, TWCSOH/BCSN		vs. Central Michigan; Championship Game	W 73–71 ^{OT}	20–13	Quicken Loans Arena (1,322); Cleveland, OH
NCAA Women's Tournament
03/18/2016*; 2:30 pm, ESPN2	(14 SF)	at (3 SF) No. 9 Ohio State; First Round	L 69–88	20–14	St. John Arena (2,626); Columbus, OH
*Non-conference game. ^{#}Rankings from AP Poll. (#) Tournament seedings in parentheses. SF=Sioux Falls Region. All times are in Eastern Time.

== See also ==
2015–16 Buffalo Bulls men's basketball team
