= 2015–16 Akron Zips women's basketball team =

Intercollegiate basketball season

2015–16 Akron Zips women's basketball

WNIT, First Round
- Conference: Mid-American Conference
- East Division
- Record: 19–14 (11–7 MAC)
- Head coach: Jodi Kest (10th season)
- Assistant coaches: Melissa Jackson; Sam Pierce; Preston Reid
- Home arena: James A. Rhodes Arena

2015–16 Mid-American Conference women's basketball standings
	Conf.				Overall
Team	W		L	PCT	W		L	PCT
East
Ohio	16	–	2	.889	26	–	7	.788
Akron	11	–	7	.611	19	–	14	.576
Buffalo †	8	–	10	.444	20	–	14	.588
Bowling Green	6	–	12	.333	10	–	18	.357
Miami (OH)	3	–	15	.167	9	–	21	.300
Kent State	3	–	15	.167	6	–	23	.207
West
Central Michigan	14	–	4	.778	22	–	11	.667
Ball State	13	–	5	.722	22	–	10	.688
Toledo	12	–	6	.667	17	–	13	.567
Eastern Michigan	10	–	8	.556	22	–	12	.647
Western Michigan	8	–	10	.444	17	–	15	.531
Northern Illinois	4	–	14	.222	11	–	19	.367
† 2016 MAC tournament winner As of March 24, 2016; Rankings from AP poll

The 2015–16 Akron Zips women's basketball team represented the University of Akron during the 2015–16 NCAA Division I women's basketball season. The Zips, led by 10th year head coach Jodi Kest, played their home games at the James A. Rhodes Arena as members of the East Division of the Mid-American Conference. They finished the season 19–14, 11–7 in MAC play to finish in second place in the East Division. They advanced to the quarterfinals of the MAC women's tournament, where they lost to Buffalo. They were invited to the Women's National Invitation Tournament, where they lost in the first round to Bucknell.

== Roster ==
2015–16 Akron Zips women's basketball team
Players
Coaches

Pos.	#	Name	Height	Year	Previous school	Hometown
F	1	Alli Ball	6 ft 1 in (1.85 m)	So	Principia	Saint Louis, MO
G	2	Megan Barilla	5 ft 10 in (1.78 m)	Sr	Magnificat	Fairview Park, OH
G	15	Anita Brown	5 ft 8 in (1.73 m)	Sr	Warren Harding	Warren, OH
F	14	Greta Burry	6 ft 1 in (1.85 m)	So	St. Joseph Academy	Lakewood, OH
G	20	Kaitlyn Flowers	5 ft 5 in (1.65 m)	So	St. Joseph	Lompoc, CA
F	23	DiAndra Gibson	5 ft 11 in (1.8 m)	Sr	Ravenna	Ravenna, OH
G	12	Lauren Hung	5 ft 8 in (1.73 m)	So	Waterford Mott	Waterford, MI
G	35	Lilli Piper	5 ft 10 in (1.78 m)	Fr	Walsh Jesuit	Norton, OH
G	22	Hannah Plybon	5 ft 9 in (1.75 m)	Jr	Orrville	Orrville, OH
G	24	Alex Ricketts	5 ft 11 in (1.8 m)	Jr	Kennedy Catholic	Mercer, PA
G	21	Hannah Scipio	5 ft 4 in (1.63 m)	Jr	New Albany	New Albany, OH
G	11	Megan Sefcik	5 ft 10 in (1.78 m)	RS Fr	Austintown Fitch	Austintown, OH
F	40	Sophia Simone	5 ft 11 in (1.8 m)	Jr	Walsh Jesuit	Silver Lake, OH
F	34	Fredniqua Walker	6 ft 1 in (1.85 m)	Fr	Shaw	Cleveland, OH

Head coach

- Jodi Kest

Assistant coach(es)

- Melissa Jackson
- Sam Pierce
- Preston Reid

Legend

- (C) Team captain
- (S) Suspended
- (I) Ineligible
- (W) Walk-on
- Injured
- Current redshirt

Roster
Last update: March 5, 2016

== Schedule and results ==
Date time, TV	Rank^{#}	Opponent^{#}	Result	Record	Site (attendance) city, state
Exhibition
11/08/2015*; 2:00 pm		Clarion	W 79–50		James A. Rhodes Arena; Akron, OH
Non-conference games
11/13/2015*; 7:00 pm		Florida Atlantic	L 77–91	0–1	FAU Arena (641); Boca Raton, FL
11/20/2015*; 10:30 am		Winthrop; Akron Classic	W 76–59	1–1	James A. Rhodes Arena (1,556); Akron, OH
11/21/2015*; 3:30 pm		Florida Gulf Coast; Akron Classic	L 57–69	1–2	James A. Rhodes Arena (743); Akron, OH
11/27/2015*; 5:00 pm		vs. Northern Colorado; San Diego Central Classic	L 65–78	1–3	Jenny Craig Pavilion; San Diego, CA
11/28/2015*; 7:00 pm		at San Diego; San Diego Central Classic	L 65–86	1–4	Jenny Craig Pavilion (503); San Diego, CA
12/02/2015*; 6:00 pm		Rochester College	W 103–37	2–4	James A. Rhodes Arena (1,150); Akron, OH
12/05/2015*; 1:00 pm		UCF	W 74–54	3–4	James A. Rhodes Arena (563); Akron, OH
12/09/2015*; 8:00 pm		at Valparaiso	W 85–74	4–4	Athletics–Recreation Center (330); Valparaiso, IN
12/13/2015*; 2:00 pm, ESPN3		vs. Northern Iowa	L 51–59	4–5	iWireless Center (634); Moline, IL
12/19/2015*; 4:30 pm		at Northern Kentucky	W 77–75 ^{OT}	5–5	BB&T Arena (1,117); Highland Heights, KY
12/21/2015*; 7:00 pm		Youngstown State	W 74–49	6–5	James A. Rhodes Arena (837); Akron, OH
MAC regular season
01/02/2016; 5:00 pm		Northern Illinois	L 58–65	6–6 (0–1)	James A. Rhodes Arena (1,386); Akron, OH
01/06/2016; 7:00 pm, ESPN3		at Eastern Michigan	W 68–65 ^{OT}	7–6 (1–1)	Convocation Center (574); Ypsilanti, MI
01/09/2016; 2:00 pm		Central Michigan	L 77–97	7–7 (1–2)	James A. Rhodes Arena (602); Akron, OH
01/13/2016; 7:00 pm		at Bowling Green	W 71–55	8–7 (2–2)	Stroh Center (1,420); Bowling Green, OH
01/16/2016; 1:00 pm		at Buffalo	W 69–61	9–7 (3–2)	Alumni Arena (816); Amherst, NY
01/20/2016; 7:00 pm		Toledo	W 81–71	10–7 (4–2)	James A. Rhodes Arena (816); Akron, OH
01/23/2016; 1:00 pm, ESPN3		at Central Michigan	L 60–81	10–8 (4–3)	McGuirk Arena (574); Mount Pleasant, MI
01/27/2016; 7:00 pm, ASN/ESPN3		at Ohio	L 55–75	10–9 (4–4)	Convocation Center (1,522); Athens, OH
01/30/2016; 7:00 pm		Eastern Michigan	W 75–72	11–9 (5–4)	James A. Rhodes Arena (1,386); Akron, OH
02/03/2016; 7:00 pm, ESPN3		at Ball State	L 71–78	11–10 (5–5)	John E. Worthen Arena (742); Muncie, IN
02/06/2016; 2:00 pm, ESPN3		Miami (OH)	W 77–65	12–10 (6–5)	James A. Rhodes Arena (642); Akron, OH
02/13/2016; 2:00 pm, ESPN3		at Western Michigan	L 65–69	12–11 (6–6)	University Arena (1,007); Kalamazoo, MI
02/17/2016; 7:00 pm		Western Michigan	W 78–66	13–11 (7–6)	James A. Rhodes Arena (974); Akron, OH
02/20/2016; 7:00 pm, BCSN/TWCSC/ESPN3		Ohio	L 73–101	13–12 (7–7)	James A. Rhodes Arena (752); Akron, OH
02/24/2016; 7:00 pm, ESPN3		at Miami (OH)	W 65–62 ^{OT}	14–12 (8–7)	Millett Hall (425); Oxford, OH
02/17/2016; 2:00 pm		at Kent State	W 70–60	15–12 (9–7)	MAC Center; Kent, OH
03/02/2016; 8:00 pm, ASN/ESPN3		Buffalo	W 62–49	16–12 (10–7)	James A. Rhodes Arena (816); Akron, OH
03/05/2016; 2:00 pm		Bowling Green	W 71–61	17–12 (11–7)	James A. Rhodes Arena (785); Akron, OH
MAC Women's Tournament
03/07/2016; 7:00 pm, ESPN3		Miami (OH); First Round	W 66–54	18–12	James A. Rhodes Arena (625); Akron, OH
03/09/2016; 2:30 pm, ESPN3		vs. Miami (OH); Quarterfinals	W 73–71	19–12	Quicken Loans Arena; Cleveland, OH
03/11/2016; 12:00 pm, TWCSC/BCSN		vs. Buffalo; Semifinals	L 87–88	19–13	Quicken Loans Arena; Cleveland, OH
WNIT
03/17/2016; 7:00 pm		Bucknell; First Round	L 70–74	19–14	James A. Rhodes Arena (343); Akron, OH
*Non-conference game. ^{#}Rankings from AP Poll. (#) Tournament seedings in parentheses. All times are in Eastern.

== See also ==
2015–16 Akron Zips men's basketball team
