= 2015–16 Bowling Green Falcons women's basketball team =

Intercollegiate basketball season

2015–16 Bowling Green Falcons women's basketball
- Conference: Mid-American Conference
- East Division
- Record: 10–18 (6–12 MAC)
- Head coach: Jennifer Roos (4th season)
- Assistant coaches: Jesse Fleming; Jacey Brooks; Sahar Nusseibeh
- Home arena: Stroh Center

2015–16 Mid-American Conference women's basketball standings
| | Conf. | | | | Overall |
| Team | W | | L | PCT | W | | L | PCT |
|---|---|---|---|---|---|---|---|---|
East
| Ohio | 16 | – | 2 | .889 | 26 | – | 7 | .788 |
| Akron | 11 | – | 7 | .611 | 19 | – | 14 | .576 |
| Buffalo † | 8 | – | 10 | .444 | 20 | – | 14 | .588 |
| Bowling Green | 6 | – | 12 | .333 | 10 | – | 18 | .357 |
| Miami (OH) | 3 | – | 15 | .167 | 9 | – | 21 | .300 |
| Kent State | 3 | – | 15 | .167 | 6 | – | 23 | .207 |
West
| Central Michigan | 14 | – | 4 | .778 | 22 | – | 11 | .667 |
| Ball State | 13 | – | 5 | .722 | 22 | – | 10 | .688 |
| Toledo | 12 | – | 6 | .667 | 17 | – | 13 | .567 |
| Eastern Michigan | 10 | – | 8 | .556 | 22 | – | 12 | .647 |
| Western Michigan | 8 | – | 10 | .444 | 17 | – | 15 | .531 |
| Northern Illinois | 4 | – | 14 | .222 | 11 | – | 19 | .367 |
† 2016 MAC tournament winner As of March 24, 2016; Rankings from AP poll

The 2015–16 Bowling Green Falcons women's basketball team represented Bowling Green State University during the 2015–16 NCAA Division I women's basketball season. The Falcons, led by fourth year head coach Jennifer Roos, played their home games at the Stroh Center as members of the East Division of the Mid-American Conference. They finished the season 10–18, 6–12 in MAC play to finish in fourth place in the East Division. They lost in the first round of the MAC women's tournament to Buffalo.

== Roster ==
2015–16 Bowling Green Falcons women's basketball team
Players
Coaches

| Pos. | # | Name | Height | Year | Previous school | Hometown |
|---|---|---|---|---|---|---|
| G | 11 | Rachel Myers | 5 ft 8 in (1.73 m) | So | Liberty–Benton | Findlay, OH |
| G | 12 | Rachel Konieczki | 5 ft 3 in (1.6 m) | Jr | Rockford Lutheran | Rockford, IL |
| G | 13 | Sydney Lambert | 5 ft 8 in (1.73 m) | Fr | McAuley | Cincinnati, OH |
| G | 14 | Carly Santoro | 5 ft 10 in (1.78 m) | Fr | Bellevue | Bellevue, OH |
| C | 20 | Sarah Baer | 6 ft 1 in (1.85 m) | So | Perrysburg | Perrysburg, OH |
| G | 23 | Kennedy Kirkpatrick | 5 ft 10 in (1.78 m) | RS So | Free State | Lawrence, KS |
| F | 24 | Leah Bolton | 5 ft 11 in (1.8 m) | Jr | Marist | Chicago, IL |
| G/F | 30 | Miriam Justinger | 6 ft 0 in (1.83 m) | Sr | Northview | Sylvania, OH |
| C | 32 | Lauren Tibbs | 6 ft 4 in (1.93 m) | RS Sr | Scott | Taylor Mill, KY |
| G | 33 | Haley Puk | 6 ft 0 in (1.83 m) | So | Waterloo West | Waterloo, IA |
| F | 34 | Ashley Tunstall | 5 ft 10 in (1.78 m) | Jr | Huber Heights Wayne | Dayton, OH |
| C | 43 | Abby Siefker | 6 ft 2 in (1.88 m) | RS Jr | Ottoville | Ottoville, OH |
| F | 44 | Maddie Cole | 6 ft 0 in (1.83 m) | Fr | Northview | Sylvania, OH |

Head coach

- Jennifer Roos

Assistant coach(es)

- Jesse Fleming
- Jacey Brooks
- Sahar Nusseibeh

Legend

- (C) Team captain
- (S) Suspended
- (I) Ineligible
- (W) Walk-on
- Injured
- Current redshirt

Roster
Last update: March 5, 2016

== Schedule ==
| Date time, TV | Rank^{#} | Opponent^{#} | Result | Record | Site (attendance) city, state |
Exhibition
| 11/07/2015*; 7:00 pm, ESPN3 | | Ashland | L 53–59 | | Stroh Center (1,257); Bowling Green, OH |
Non-conference regular season
| 11/13/2015*; 7:00 pm, ESPN3 | | Illinois State | W 70–52 | 1–0 | Stroh Center (1,469); Bowling Green, OH |
| 11/15/2015*; 2:00 pm, ESPN3 | | Bradley | W 66–53 | 2–0 | Stroh Center (1,506); Bowling Green, OH |
| 11/21/2015*; 7:00 pm | | at Cincinnati | L 51–54 | 2–1 | Fifth Third Arena (963); Cincinnati, OH |
| 11/27/2015*; 12:00 pm | | vs. Davidson; UNC Wilmington Thanksgiving Tournament | L 56–60 | 2–2 | Trask Coliseum; Wilmington, NC |
| 11/28/2015*; 12:00 pm | | vs. Jacksonville; UNC Wilmington Thanksgiving Tournament | W 72–69 ^{OT} | 3–2 | Trask Coliseum; Wilmington, NC |
| 12/02/2015*; 6:00 pm, ESPN3 | | Evansville | W 74–56 | 4–2 | Stroh Center (1,986); Bowling Green, OH |
| 12/05/2015*; 1:00 pm, ESPN3 | | at Cleveland State | L 48–69 | 4–3 | Quicken Loans Arena (3,671); Cleveland, OH |
| 12/08/2015*; 11:00 am | | at Virginia | L 39–68 | 4–4 | John Paul Jones Arena (10,048); Charlottesivlle, VA |
| 12/21/2015*; 7:00 pm, ESPN3 | | South Dakota | L 45–58 | 4–5 | Stroh Center (2,175); Bowling Green, OH |
| 12/29/2015*; 3:00 pm | | vs. Texas Southern; UTSA Holiday Classic | | | Convocation Center; San Antonio, TX |
| 12/30/2015*; 1:00 pm | | at UTSA; UTSA Holiday Classic | | | Convocation Center; San Antonio, TX |
MAC regular season
| 01/02/2016; 1:00 pm, ESPN3 | | at Miami (OH) | W 64–58 | 5–5 (1–0) | Millett Hall (512); Oxford, OH |
| 01/06/2016; 7:00 pm, ESPN3 | | at Western Michigan | L 45–74 | 5–6 (1–1) | University Arena (558); Kalamazoo, MI |
| 01/09/2016; 4:00 pm, ESPN3 | | Ohio | L 57–72 | 5–7 (1–2) | Stroh Center (2,097); Bowling Green, OH |
| 01/13/2016; 7:00 pm, ESPN3 | | Akron | L 55–71 | 5–8 (1–3) | Stroh Center (1,420); Bowling Green, OH |
| 01/16/2016; 2:00 pm, ESPN3 | | Ball State | L 56–67 | 5–9 (1–4) | Stroh Center (1,561); Bowling Green, OH |
| 01/20/2016; 8:00 pm, ESPN3 | | at Northern Illinois | W 58–43 | 6–9 (2–4) | Convocation Center (303); DeKalb, IL |
| 01/23/2016; 2:00 pm, ESPN3 | | Kent State | W 67–63 | 7–9 (3–4) | Stroh Center (2,053); Bowling Green, OH |
| 01/27/2016; 7:00 pm, ESPN3 | | Eastern Michigan | W 71–49 | 8–9 (4–4) | Stroh Center (1,771); Bowling Green, OH |
| 01/30/2016; 2:00 pm, ESPN3 | | at Toledo | L 61–76 | 8–10 (4–5) | Savage Arena (4,906); Toledo, OH |
| 02/06/2016; 2:00 pm, ESPN3 | | at Central Michigan | L 75–76 | 8–11 (4–6) | McGuirk Arena (1,598); Mount Pleasant, MI |
| 02/10/2016; 7:00 pm, ESPN3 | | Western Michigan | L 49–65 | 8–12 (4–7) | Stroh Center (1,578); Bowling Green, OH |
| 02/13/2016; 4:30 pm, ESPN3 | | Buffalo | L 50–63 | 8–13 (4–8) | Stroh Center (2,513); Bowling Green, OH |
| 02/17/2016; 7:00 pm, BCSN/TWCSC/ESPN3 | | Toledo | L 60–68 | 8–14 (4–9) | Stroh Center (2,644); Bowling Green, OH |
| 02/20/2016; 5:00 pm | | at Kent State | W 65–55 | 9–14 (5–9) | MAC Center (785); Kent, OH |
| 02/24/2016; 4:30 pm, ESPN3 | | Buffalo | L 52–55 | 9–15 (5–10) | Alumni Arena (824); Amherst, NY |
| 02/27/2016; 1:00 pm, BCSN/TWCSC/ESPN3 | | Miami (OH) | W 76–56 | 10–15 (6–10) | Stroh Center (2,028); Bowling Green, OH |
| 03/02/2016; 7:00 pm | | at Ohio | L 58–75 | 10–16 (6–11) | Convocation Center (1,039); Athens, OH |
| 03/05/2016; 2:00 pm | | at Akron | L 61–71 | 10–17 (6–12) | James A. Rhodes Arena (785); Akron, OH |
MAC Women's Tournament
| 03/07/2016; 5:30 pm, ESPN3 | | at Buffalo; First Round | L 44–60 | 10–18 | Alumni Arena (807); Amherst, NY |
*Non-conference game. ^{#}Rankings from AP Poll. (#) Tournament seedings in parentheses. All times are in Eastern Time.

== See also ==
2015–16 Bowling Green Falcons men's basketball team
