= 2015–16 Miami RedHawks women's basketball team =

Intercollegiate basketball season

2015–16 Miami RedHawks women's basketball
- Conference: Mid-American Conference
- East Division
- Record: 9–21 (3–15 MAC)
- Head coach: Cleve Wright (3rd season)
- Assistant coaches: Colleen Day; Ashley Saia; Alioune Ndiaye
- Home arena: Millett Hall

2015–16 Mid-American Conference women's basketball standings
	Conf.				Overall
Team	W		L	PCT	W		L	PCT
East
Ohio	16	–	2	.889	26	–	7	.788
Akron	11	–	7	.611	19	–	14	.576
Buffalo †	8	–	10	.444	20	–	14	.588
Bowling Green	6	–	12	.333	10	–	18	.357
Miami (OH)	3	–	15	.167	9	–	21	.300
Kent State	3	–	15	.167	6	–	23	.207
West
Central Michigan	14	–	4	.778	22	–	11	.667
Ball State	13	–	5	.722	22	–	10	.688
Toledo	12	–	6	.667	17	–	13	.567
Eastern Michigan	10	–	8	.556	22	–	12	.647
Western Michigan	8	–	10	.444	17	–	15	.531
Northern Illinois	4	–	14	.222	11	–	19	.367
† 2016 MAC tournament winner As of March 24, 2016; Rankings from AP poll

The 2015–16 Miami RedHawks women's basketball team represented Miami University during the 2015–16 NCAA Division I women's basketball season. The RedHawks, led by third year head coach Cleve Wright, played their home games at Millett Hall, as members of the East Division of the Mid-American Conference. They finished the season 9–21, 3–15 in MAC play to finish in a tie for fifth place in the East Division. They lost in the first round of the MAC women's tournament to Akron.

== Roster ==
2015–16 Miami RedHawks women's basketball team
Players
Coaches

Pos.	#	Name	Height	Year	Previous school	Hometown
G	2	Morgan Horvath	5 ft 9 in (1.75 m)	Fr	Olentangy	Lewis Center, OH
F	3	Tamira Ford	5 ft 10 in (1.78 m)	Sr	Padua Franciscan	Cleveland, OH
G	4	Nanci Hunter	5 ft 0 in (1.52 m)	Fr	Sycamore	Cincinnati, OH
F	10	Kristen Levering	6 ft 2 in (1.88 m)	Fr	Olentangy Liberty	Powell, OH
G	11	Ana Richter	6 ft 1 in (1.85 m)	So	Talawanda	Oxford, OH
F	12	Hannah McCue	6 ft 0 in (1.83 m)	Sr	Rocky River	Rocky River, OH
G	15	Kayla Brown	6 ft 2 in (1.88 m)	So	Westfield	Westfield, IN
G	21	Leah Purvis	5 ft 6 in (1.68 m)	Fr	The Buckley School	Los Angeles, CA
G	22	Jazz Smith	5 ft 8 in (1.73 m)	So	Rogers	Toledo, OH
G	24	Baleigh Reid	5 ft 10 in (1.78 m)	So	Twinsburg	Twinsburg, OH
G/F	25	Molly McDonagh	6 ft 0 in (1.83 m)	So	Glenbrook South	Glenview, IL
F	34	Megan Galloway	6 ft 2 in (1.88 m)	RS So	Greenville	Greenville, OH
G/F	40	Kendall McCoy	6 ft 0 in (1.83 m)	Fr	Sylvania Northview	Sylvania, OH
F	42	Jessica Rupright	6 ft 2 in (1.88 m)	Sr	Norwell	Ossian, IN

Head coach

- Cleve Wright

Assistant coach(es)

- Colleen Day
- Ashley Saia
- Alioune Ndiaye

Legend

- (C) Team captain
- (S) Suspended
- (I) Ineligible
- (W) Walk-on
- Injured
- Current redshirt

Roster
Last update: March 5, 2016

== Schedule ==
Date time, TV	Rank^{#}	Opponent^{#}	Result	Record	Site (attendance) city, state
Exhibition
11/06/2015*; 7:00 pm		West Virginia State	W 70–53		Millett Hall (160); Oxford, OH
Non-conference regular season
11/13/2015*; 1:30 pm, ESPN3		Northern Kentucky	L 57–71	0–1	Millett Hall (1,651); Oxford, OH
11/16/2015*; 7:00 pm, ESPN3		Evansville	W 91–85 ^{2OT}	1–1	Millett Hall (201); Oxford, OH
11/19/2015*; 7:00 pm, ESPN3		Austin Peay	W 75–60	2–1	Millett Hall (226); Oxford, OH
11/24/2015*; 12:00 pm, ESPN3		Eastern Kentucky	L 72–77 ^{OT}	2–2	Millett Hall (980); Oxford, OH
11/29/2015*; 4:00 pm, ESPN3		Morehead State	W 59–57	3–2	Millett Hall (209); Oxford, OH
12/02/2015*; 8:00 pm, ESPN3		at Valparaiso	W 75–72	4–2	Athletics–Recreation Center (314); Valparaiso, IN
12/05/2015*; 2:00 pm, ESPN3		Oakland	W 65–54	5–2	Millett Hall (180); Oxford, OH
12/15/2015*; 7:00 pm		at Tennessee–Martin	L 47–74	5–3	Skyhawk Arena (873); Martin, TN
12/19/2015*; 2:30 pm		at Michigan	L 55–97	5–4	Crisler Center (2,396); Ann Arbor, MI
12/29/2015*; 2:30 pm		vs. LIU Brooklyn; FAU Holiday Tournament semifinals	W 68–49	6–4	FAU Arena; Boca Raton, FL
12/30/2015*; 7:15 pm		at Florida Atlantic; FAU Holiday Tournament championship	L 65–68 ^{OT}	6–5	FAU Arena (526); Boca Raton, FL
MAC regular season
01/02/2016; 1:00 pm, ESPN3		Bowling Green	L 58–64	6–6 (0–1)	Millett Hall (512); Oxford, OH
01/06/2016; 7:00 pm, ESPN3		Northern Illinois	W 66–60	7–6 (1–1)	Millett Hall (312); Oxford, OH
01/09/2016; 2:00 pm, ESPN3		at Ball State	L 41–66	7–7 (1–2)	John E. Worthen Arena (1,063); Muncie, IN
01/13/2016; 7:00 pm, ESPN3		Toledo	L 50–55	7–8 (1–3)	Millett Hall (189); Oxford, OH
01/16/2016; 2:00 pm, ESPN3		at Western Michigan	L 66–80	7–9 (1–4)	University Arena (795); Kalamazoo, MI
01/20/2016; 7:00 pm, ESPN3		Central Michigan	L 58–72	7–10 (1–5)	Millett Hall (230); Oxford, OH
01/23/2016; 2:00 pm, ESPN3		Buffalo	W 69–58	8–10 (2–5)	Millett Hall (350); Oxford, OH
01/30/2016; 1:00 pm, ESPN3		at Central Michigan	L 54–77	8–11 (2–6)	McGuirk Arena (1,600); Mount Pleasant, MI
02/03/2016; 7:00 pm, ESPN3		Kent State	W 55–52	9–11 (3–6)	Millett Hall (582); Oxford, OH
02/06/2016; 2:00 pm, ESPN3		at Akron	L 65–77	9–12 (3–7)	James A. Rhodes Arena (642); Akron, OH
02/10/2016; 12:30 pm		at Northern Illinois	L 73–92	9–13 (3–8)	Convocation Center (922); DeKalb, IL
02/13/2016; 2:00 pm, ESPN3		Eastern Michigan	L 46–70	9–14 (3–9)	Millett Hall (586); Oxford, OH
02/17/2016; 7:00 pm, ASN/ESPN3		at Ohio	L 44–72	9–15 (3–10)	Convocation Center (586); Athens, OH
02/20/2016; 2:00 pm, ESPN3		at Buffalo	L 38–59	9–16 (3–11)	Alumni Arena; Amherst, NY
02/24/2016; 7:00 pm, ESPN3		Akron	L 62–65 ^{OT}	9–17 (3–12)	Millett Hall (425); Oxford, OH
02/27/2016; 1:00 pm, BCSN/ESPN3		at Bowling Green	L 56–76	9–18 (3–13)	Stroh Center (2,028); Bowling Green, OH
03/02/2016; 7:00 pm, BCSN/TWCSC/ESPN3		at Kent State	L 53–59	9–19 (3–14)	MAC Center (470); Kent, OH
03/05/2016; 2:00 pm, ESPN3		Ohio	L 58–77	9–20 (3–15)	Millett Hall (591); Oxford, OH
MAC Women's Tournament
03/07/2016; 7:00 pm		at Akron; First Round	L 54–66	9–21	James A. Rhodes Arena (625); Akron, OH
*Non-conference game. ^{#}Rankings from AP Poll. (#) Tournament seedings in parentheses. All times are in Eastern Time.

== See also ==
2015–16 Miami RedHawks men's basketball team
