= 2015–16 Ball State Cardinals women's basketball team =

Intercollegiate basketball season

2015–16 Ball State Cardinals women's basketball

WNIT, second round
- Conference: Mid-American Conference
- West Division
- Record: 22–10 (13–5 MAC)
- Head coach: Brady Sallee (4th season)
- Assistant coaches: Tennille Adams; Audrey McDonald-Spencer; Ryan Patterson
- Home arena: Worthen Arena

2015–16 Mid-American Conference women's basketball standings
	Conf.				Overall
Team	W		L	PCT	W		L	PCT
East
Ohio	16	–	2	.889	26	–	7	.788
Akron	11	–	7	.611	19	–	14	.576
Buffalo †	8	–	10	.444	20	–	14	.588
Bowling Green	6	–	12	.333	10	–	18	.357
Miami (OH)	3	–	15	.167	9	–	21	.300
Kent State	3	–	15	.167	6	–	23	.207
West
Central Michigan	14	–	4	.778	22	–	11	.667
Ball State	13	–	5	.722	22	–	10	.688
Toledo	12	–	6	.667	17	–	13	.567
Eastern Michigan	10	–	8	.556	22	–	12	.647
Western Michigan	8	–	10	.444	17	–	15	.531
Northern Illinois	4	–	14	.222	11	–	19	.367
† 2016 MAC tournament winner As of March 24, 2016; Rankings from AP poll

The 2015–16 Ball State Cardinals women's basketball team represented Ball State University during the 2015–16 NCAA Division I women's basketball season. The Cardinals, led by fourth-year head coach Brady Sallee, played their home games at Worthen Arena as members of the West Division of the Mid-American Conference (MAC). They finished the season 22–10, 13–5 in MAC play, to finish in second place in the West Division. They lost in the quarterfinals of the MAC women's tournament to Eastern Michigan. They were invited to the Women's National Invitation Tournament, where they defeated Iowa Hawkeyes in the first round before losing in the second round to Saint Louis.

== Roster ==
2015–16 Ball State Cardinals women's basketball team
Players
Coaches

Pos.	#	Name	Height	Year	Previous school	Hometown
G	22	Destiny Washington	5 ft 11 in (1.8 m)	So	Lawrence North	Indianapolis, IN
G	24	Alana Aguirre	5 ft 10 in (1.78 m)	So	Justin Wakeland	Frisco, TX
C	14	Renee Bennett	6 ft 5 in (1.96 m)	Jr	Muskego	Muskego, WI
F	15	Lucia Fernandez	6 ft 1 in (1.85 m)	Fr	Baloncesto Torrelodones	Madrid, Spain
G	4	Nathalie Fontaine	6 ft 2 in (1.88 m)	Sr	Stockholm, Sweden
G	20	Frannie Frazier	5 ft 9 in (1.75 m)	So	Worthington	Columbus, OH
G	3	Carmen Grande	5 ft 8 in (1.73 m)	Fr	Estudiantes and Rivas	Madrid, Spain
G	10	Calyn Hosea	5 ft 11 in (1.8 m)	Jr	Lawrence Central	Indianapolis, IN
F	30	Shelby Merder	6 ft 3 in (1.91 m)	Sr	Jasper	Jasper, IN
F	33	Moriah Monaco	6 ft 1 in (1.85 m)	So	Dover	Dover, OH
G	5	Jill Morrison	5 ft 7 in (1.7 m)	Jr	Winchester	Winchester, IN
G	31	Nakeya Penny	5 ft 11 in (1.8 m)	Fr	Logansport	Logansport, IN
G	00	Brionna Simond	5 ft 5 in (1.65 m)	So	Riverside University	Milwaukee, WI

Head coach

- Brady Sallee

Assistant coach(es)

- Tennille Adams
- Audrey McDonald-Spencer
- Ryan Patterson

Legend

- (C) Team captain
- (S) Suspended
- (I) Ineligible
- (W) Walk-on
- Injured
- Current redshirt

Roster
Last update: July 27, 2024

== Schedule ==
Date time, TV	Rank^{#}	Opponent^{#}	Result	Record	Site (attendance) city, state
Exhibition
November 3, 2015*; 7:00 p.m.		Urbana	W 151–72		John E. Worthen Arena; Muncie, IN
Non-conference regular season
November 13, 2015*; 5:30 p.m.		at Charlotte	L 66–72	0–1	Dale F. Halton Arena (5,390); Charlotte, NC
November 19, 2015*; 7:00 p.m., ESPN3		WKU	W 74–60	1–1	John E. Worthen Arena (987); Muncie, IN
November 23, 2015*; 7:00 p.m., ESPN3		Austin Peay	W 72–44	2–1	John E. Worthen Arena (927); Muncie, IN
November 27, 2015*; 7:30 p.m.		vs. Florida; Omni Hotels Classic semifinals	L 78–85	2–2	Coors Events Center (538); Boulder, CO
November 28, 2015*; 7:00 p.m.		vs. Massachusetts; Omni Hotels Classic 3rd-place game	W 81–54	3–2	Coors Events Center; Boulder, CO
December 3, 2015*; 7:00 p.m., ESPN3		Ohio Valley	W 94–45	4–2	John E. Worthen Arena (713); Muncie, IN
December 6, 2015*; 2:00 p.m., ESPN3		Butler	W 58–50	5–2	John E. Worthen Arena (1,125); Muncie, IN
December 10, 2015*; 6:00 p.m., ESPN3		at Lipscomb	W 72–60	6–2	Allen Arena (150); Nashville, TN
December 13, 2015*; 2:00 p.m.		at Purdue	L 63–73	6–3	Mackey Arena (5,958); West Lafayette, IN
December 21, 2015*; 8:00 p.m., ESPN3		at Evansville	W 73–53	7–3	Ford Center (611); Evansville, IN
December 28, 2015*; 7:00 p.m., ESPN3		Saint Louis	W 79–70	8–3	John E. Worthen Arena (958); Muncie, IN
MAC regular season
January 2, 2016; 2:00 p.m., ESPN3		Toledo	W 75–69	9–3 (1–0)	John E. Worthen Arena (907); Muncie, IN
January 6, 2016; 7:00 p.m.		at Ohio	L 48–73	9–4 (1–1)	Convocation Center (834); Athens, OH
January 9, 2016; 2:00 p.m., ESPN3		Miami (OH)	W 66–41	10–4 (2–1)	John E. Worthen Arena (1,063); Muncie, IN
January 13, 2016; 7:00 p.m., ESPN3		Buffalo	W 68–63	11–4 (3–1)	John E. Worthen Arena (953); Muncie, IN
January 16, 2016; 2:00 p.m., ESPN3		at Bowling Green	W 67–56	12–4 (4–1)	Stroh Center (1,561); Bowling Green, OH
January 20, 2016; 7:00 p.m., ESPN3		Eastern Michigan	W 76–54	13–4 (5–1)	John E. Worthen Arena (844); Muncie, IN
January 23, 2016; 2:00 p.m., ESPN3		at Western Michigan	W 77–53	14–4 (6–1)	University Arena (1,092); Kalamazoo, MI
January 30, 2016; 4:00 p.m., ESPN3		Ohio	L 67–68	14–5 (6–2)	John E. Worthen Arena (907); Muncie, IN
February 3, 2016; 7:00 p.m., ESPN3		Akron	W 78–71	15–5 (7–2)	John E. Worthen Arena (742); Muncie, IN
February 6, 2016; 1:00 p.m.		at Buffalo	W 59–57	16–5 (8–2)	Alumni Arena (1,618); Amherst, NY
February 10, 2016; 7:00 p.m., ESPN3		Central Michigan	L 65–74	16–6 (8–3)	John E. Worthen Arena (742); Muncie, IN
February 13, 2016; 2:00 p.m.		at Kent State	L 50–59	16–7 (8–4)	MAC Center (742); Kent, OH
February 17, 2016; 2:00 p.m., ESPN3		at Northern Illinois	W 73–57	17–7 (9–4)	Convocation Center (468); DeKalb, IL
February 20, 2016; 1:00 p.m., ESPN3		Western Michigan	W 70–64	18–7 (10–4)	John E. Worthen Arena (1,068); Muncie, IN
February 24, 2016; 7:00 p.m., ESPN3		at Central Michigan	L 66–67	18–8 (10–5)	McGuirk Arena (1,242); Mount Pleasant, MI
February 27, 2016; 2:00 p.m.		at Eastern Michigan	W 67–63	19–8 (11–5)	Convocation Center (908); Ypsilanti, OH
March 2, 2016; 7:00 p.m., ESPN3		Northern Illinois	W 64–60	20–8 (12–5)	John E. Worthen Arena (468); Muncie, IN
March 5, 2016; 2:00 p.m., BCSN/TWCS/ESPN3		at Toledo	W 68–58	21–8 (13–5)	Savage Arena (4,267); Toledo, OH
MAC women's tournament
March 9, 2016; 7:30 p.m., ESPN3		vs. Eastern Michigan; Quarterfinals	L 53–67	21–9	Quicken Loans Arena (2,355); Cleveland, OH
WNIT
March 17, 2016*; 8:00 p.m.		at Iowa	W 77–72	22–9	Carver–Hawkeye Arena (2,039); Iowa City, IA
March 21, 2016*; 8:00 p.m.		at Saint Louis	L 57–59	22–10	Chaifetz Arena (1,430); St. Louis, MO
*Non-conference game. ^{#}Rankings from AP poll. (#) Tournament seedings in parentheses. All times are in Eastern.

== See also ==
- 2015–16 Ball State Cardinals men's basketball team
