= 2015–16 Kent State Golden Flashes women's basketball team =

American college basketball season

2015–16 Kent State Golden Flashes women's basketball
- Conference: Mid-American Conference
- East Division
- Record: 6–23 (3–15 MAC)
- Head coach: Danielle O'Banion (4th season)
- Assistant coaches: Geoff Lanier; Kylene Spiegel; Keith Gwynn
- Home arena: MAC Center

2015–16 Mid-American Conference women's basketball standings
	Conf.				Overall
Team	W		L	PCT	W		L	PCT
East
Ohio	16	–	2	.889	26	–	7	.788
Akron	11	–	7	.611	19	–	14	.576
Buffalo †	8	–	10	.444	20	–	14	.588
Bowling Green	6	–	12	.333	10	–	18	.357
Miami (OH)	3	–	15	.167	9	–	21	.300
Kent State	3	–	15	.167	6	–	23	.207
West
Central Michigan	14	–	4	.778	22	–	11	.667
Ball State	13	–	5	.722	22	–	10	.688
Toledo	12	–	6	.667	17	–	13	.567
Eastern Michigan	10	–	8	.556	22	–	12	.647
Western Michigan	8	–	10	.444	17	–	15	.531
Northern Illinois	4	–	14	.222	11	–	19	.367
† 2016 MAC tournament winner As of March 24, 2016; Rankings from AP poll

The 2015–16 Kent State Golden Flashes women's basketball team represented Kent State University during the 2015–16 NCAA Division I women's basketball season. The Golden Flashes, led by fourth year head coach Danielle O'Banion, played their home games at the Memorial Athletic and Convocation Center, also known as the MAC Center, as members of the East Division of the Mid-American Conference. They finished the season 6–23, 3–15 in MAC play to finish in a tie for fifth place in the East Division. They were seeded 12th in the 2016 MAC women's basketball tournament and lost in the first round to Eastern Michigan.

On March 15, Kent State and Head Coach Danielle O'Banion mutually agreed to part ways. She finished at Kent State with a 4 year record of 21–98.

== Roster ==
2015–16 Kent State Golden Flashes women's basketball team
Players
Coaches

Pos.	#	Name	Height	Year	Hometown
G	1	Naddiyah Cross	5 ft 6 in (1.68 m)	So	Centerville, OH
G	2	Taylor Parker	5 ft 6 in (1.68 m)	Fr	Detroit, MI
G	3	Larissa Lurken	5 ft 9 in (1.75 m)	Jr	Cottage Grove, MN
F	10	McKenna Stephens	6 ft 0 in (1.83 m)	RS So	Uniontown, OH
G	11	Keziah Lewis	5 ft 10 in (1.78 m)	Jr	Hobsonville, New Zealand
F	21	Savannah Neace	6 ft 3 in (1.91 m)	Fr	Hebron, KY
F	22	Merissa Barber-Smith	6 ft 4 in (1.93 m)	Fr	Madison, WI
G	24	Alexa Golden	5 ft 9 in (1.75 m)	Fr	Pittsburgh, PA
G	31	Megan Carter	5 ft 7 in (1.7 m)	Fr	Farmington Hills, MI
G	32	Paige Salisbury	5 ft 9 in (1.75 m)	Fr	Brunswick, OH
F	34	Zenobia Bess	6 ft 1 in (1.85 m)	Jr	Gahanna, OH
F	35	Jordan Korinek	6 ft 2 in (1.88 m)	So	Cuyahoga Falls, OH
F	42	Chelsi Watson	5 ft 10 in (1.78 m)	Jr	Monroe, LA
G	44	Tyra James	5 ft 11 in (1.8 m)	RS Fr	Cincinnati, OH
C	55	Lacey Miller	6 ft 1 in (1.85 m)	Jr	Mentor, OH
F	54	Kendall Jessing	6 ft 0 in (1.83 m)	Fr	Sylvania, OH

Head coach

- Danielle O'Banion

Assistant coach(es)

- Geoff Lanier
- Kylene Spiegel
- Keith Gwynn

Legend

- (C) Team captain
- (S) Suspended
- (I) Ineligible
- (W) Walk-on
- Injured
- Current redshirt

Roster
Last update: March 6, 2016

== Schedule and results ==
Date time, TV	Rank^{#}	Opponent^{#}	Result	Record	Site (attendance) city, state
Exhibition
11/08/2015*; 2:00 pm		Hiram College	W 73–45		MAC Center; Kent, OH
Non-Conference Games
11/15/2015*; 2:00 pm		Colgate	W 76–71	1–0	MAC Center (521); Kent, OH
11/17/2015*; 11:00 am		Wright State	L 68–73	1–1	MAC Center (501); Kent, OH
11/19/2015*; 7:00 pm		at IPFW	L 68–86	1–2	Hilliard Gates Sports Center (539); Fort Wayne, IN
11/24/2015*; 6:30 pm		Minnesota	L 73–85	1–3	MAC Center (594); Kent, OH
11/28/2015*; 2:00 pm		Malone	W 73–59	2–3	MAC Center (397); Kent, OH
12/02/2015*; 7:00 pm		Cleveland State	L 49–60	2–4	MAC Center (375); Kent, OH
12/05/2015*; 7:00 pm		North Dakota State	W 75–54	3–4	MAC Center (451); Kent, OH
12/08/2015*; 8:00 pm, ESPN3		at Bradley	L 60–68	3–5	Renaissance Coliseum (412); Peoria, IL
12/12/2015*; 12:00 pm, ESPN3		at Youngstown State	L 61–91	3–6	Beeghly Center (1,245); Youngstown, OH
12/22/2015*; 2:00 pm		Brown	L 57–62	3–7	MAC Center (527); Kent, OH
Conference Games
01/02/2016; 1:00 pm, ESPN3		at Central Michigan	L 61–81	3–8 (0–1)	McGuirk Arena (1,526); Mount Pleasant, MI
01/06/2016; 7:00 pm, ESPN3		at Toledo	L 67–73	3–9 (0–2)	Savage Arena (3,613); Toledo, OH
01/09/2016; 2:00 pm, ESPN3		Buffalo	L 66–77	3–10 (0–3)	MAC Center (433); Kent, OH
01/13/2016; 7:00 pm, ESPN3		at Western Michigan	L 52–73	3–11 (0–4)	University Arena (519); Kalamazoo, MI
01/16/2016; 4:30 pm, ESPN3		at Eastern Michigan	L 51–72	3–12 (0–5)	Convocation Center (1,984); Ypsilanti, MI
01/20/2016; 7:00 pm, ESPN3		Ohio	L 54–93	3–13 (0–6)	MAC Center (589); Kent, OH
01/23/2016; 2:00 pm		at Bowling Green	L 49–71	3–14 (0–7)	Stroh Center (2,053); Bowling Green, OH
01/27/2016; 7:00 pm		Northern Illinois	W 95–85	4–14 (1–7)	MAC Center (361); Kent, OH
01/30/2016; 2:00 pm		Western Michigan	L 53–65	4–15 (1–8)	MAC Center (525); Kent, OH
02/03/2016; 7:00 pm, ESPN3		at Miami (OH)	L 52–55	4–16 (1–9)	Millett Hall (582); Oxford, OH
02/06/2016; 5:00 pm, ESPN3		at Toledo	L 64–67	4–17 (1–10)	MAC Center (666); Kent, OH
02/13/2016; 2:00 pm		Ball State	W 59–50	5–17 (2–10)	MAC Center (644); Kent, OH
02/17/2016; 7:00 pm		at Akron	L 66–78	5–18 (2–11)	James A. Rhodes Arena (974); Akron, OH
02/20/2016; 5:00 pm		Bowling Green	L 55–65	5–19 (2–12)	MAC Center (785); Kent, OH
02/24/2016; 7:00 pm, ESPN3		at Ohio	L 52–86	5–20 (2–13)	Convocation Center (1,126); Athens, OH
02/27/2016; 2:00 pm		Akron	L 60–70	5–21 (2–14)	MAC Center; Kent, OH
03/02/2016; 7:00 pm, BCSN/TWCSC/ESPN3		Miami (OH)	W 59–53	6–21 (3–14)	MAC Center (470); Kent, OH
03/05/2016; 2:00 pm, ESPN3		at Buffalo	L 47–63	6–22 (3–15)	Alumni Arena (1,678); Amherst, NY
MAC Women's Tournament
03/07/2016; 5:00 pm, ESPN3		at Eastern Michigan; First Round	L 60–73	6–23	Convocation Center (1,075); Ypsilanti, MI
*Non-conference game. ^{#}Rankings from AP Poll. (#) Tournament seedings in parentheses. All times are in Eastern.

== See also ==
- 2015–16 Kent State Golden Flashes men's basketball team
