= 2015–16 Eastern Michigan Eagles women's basketball team =

Intercollegiate basketball season

2015–16 Eastern Michigan Eagles women's basketball

WNIT, Second Round
- Conference: Mid-American Conference
- West Division
- Record: 22–12 (10–8 MAC)
- Head coach: Tory Verdi (4th season)
- Assistant coaches: Mike Groulx; Candice Finley; Carly Thibault
- Home arena: Convocation Center

2015–16 Mid-American Conference women's basketball standings
	Conf.				Overall
Team	W		L	PCT	W		L	PCT
East
Ohio	16	–	2	.889	26	–	7	.788
Akron	11	–	7	.611	19	–	14	.576
Buffalo †	8	–	10	.444	20	–	14	.588
Bowling Green	6	–	12	.333	10	–	18	.357
Miami (OH)	3	–	15	.167	9	–	21	.300
Kent State	3	–	15	.167	6	–	23	.207
West
Central Michigan	14	–	4	.778	22	–	11	.667
Ball State	13	–	5	.722	22	–	10	.688
Toledo	12	–	6	.667	17	–	13	.567
Eastern Michigan	10	–	8	.556	22	–	12	.647
Western Michigan	8	–	10	.444	17	–	15	.531
Northern Illinois	4	–	14	.222	11	–	19	.367
† 2016 MAC tournament winner As of March 24, 2016; Rankings from AP poll

The 2015–16 Eastern Michigan Eagles women's basketball team represented Eastern Michigan University during the 2015–16 NCAA Division I women's basketball season. The Eagles, led by fourth year head coach Tory Verdi, played their home games at the Convocation Center, as members of the West Division of the Mid-American Conference. They finished the season 22–12, 10–8 in MAC play to finish in fourth place in the West Division. They advance to the semifinals of the MAC women's tournament where they lost to Central Michigan. They were invited to the WNIT where they defeated Saint Mary's in the first round before losing to TCU in the second round.

On April 9, it was announced that Tory Verdi has resigned from Eastern Michigan and accepted a coaching job at UMass. He finished at Eastern Michigan with a 4 year record of 72–61.

== Roster ==
2015–16 Eastern Michigan Eagles women's basketball team
Players
Coaches

Pos.	#	Name	Height	Year	Previous school	Hometown
F	00	KaBria Walker	5 ft 10 in (1.78 m)	Sr	Rogers	Toledo, OH
G	2	Sasha Dailey	5 ft 8 in (1.73 m)	So	Rogers	Toledo, OH
F	3	Tori Easley	6 ft 1 in (1.85 m)	So	Rogers	Toledo, OH
G	13	Janay Morton	5 ft 10 in (1.78 m)	Jr	Osseo	Brooklyn Park, MN
F	14	Chavon Tiggs	6 ft 0 in (1.83 m)	Fr	Dearborn Heights Robichard	Inkster, MI
F	15	Chanise Baldwin (I) (redshirt)	6 ft 3 in (1.91 m)	Sr	Martin Luther King; Providence	Pontiac, MI
G	21	Phillis Webb	5 ft 9 in (1.75 m)	Jr	Osseo	Brooklyn Park, MN
G	22	Sheyna Deans	5 ft 9 in (1.75 m)	Jr	Mount Clemens; St. Clair County CC	Mount Clemens, MI
G	23	Sera Ozelci	6 ft 1 in (1.85 m)	Sr	TED Ankara College; Odessa College	Ankara, Turkey
G	24	Cha Sweeney	5 ft 2 in (1.57 m)	Jr	Rogers	Toledo, OH
G	42	Micah Robinson	5 ft 8 in (1.73 m)	So	Huron	Ann Arbor, MI
F	44	Ashley Nickens (I) (redshirt)	6 ft 3 in (1.91 m)	Jr	Henry Ford II; Cincinnati	Sterling Heights, MI
C	52	Rachel Kehoe	6 ft 4 in (1.93 m)	Sr	St. Clair; St. Clair County CC	St. Clair, MI

Head coach

- Tory Verdi (Keene State)

Assistant coach(es)

- Mike Groulx (Siena Heights)
- Candice Finley (Eastern Kentucky)
- Carly Thibault (Monmouth)

Legend

- (C) Team captain
- (S) Suspended
- (I) Ineligible
- (W) Walk-on
- Injured
- Current redshirt

Roster

== Schedule ==
Date time, TV	Rank^{#}	Opponent^{#}	Result	Record	Site (attendance) city, state
Exhibition
11/10/2015*; 7:00 pm		Wayne State	W 70–43		Convocation Center; Ypsilanti, MI
Non-conference regular season
11/17/2015*; 7:00 pm, ESPN3		Hillsdale	W 94–77	1–0	Convocation Center (535); Ypsilanti, MI
11/21/2015*; 2:00 pm, ESPN3		Texas–Rio Grande Valley	W 78–56	2–0	Convocation Center (443); Ypsilanti, MI
11/25/2015*; 12:00 pm		at No. 12 Kentucky	L 67–89	2–1	Memorial Coliseum (4,988); Lexington, KY
12/01/2015*; 7:00 pm, ESPN3		Oral Roberts	W 77–69	3–1	Convocation Center (440); Ypsilanti, MI
12/04/2015*; 6:30 pm		at Air Force; Air Force Classic	W 72–59	4–1	Clune Arena (96); Colorado Springs, CO
12/05/2015*; 9:00 pm		vs. Abilene Christian; Air Force Classic	L 59–83	4–2	Clune Arena; Colorado Springs, CO
12/08/2015*; 7:00 pm		at Harvard	W 85–81	5–2	Lavietes Pavilion (408); Cambridge, MA
12/10/2015*; 7:00 pm, ESPN3		at Monmouth	W 78–68	6–2	Multipurpose Activity Center (541); West Long Branch, NJ
12/18/2015*; 5:30 pm		at Madonna	W 104–45	7–2	Activities Center (177); Livonia, MI
12/23/2015*; 3:30 pm, ESPN3		Michigan	W 64–63	8–2	Convocation Center (1,757); Ypsilanti, MI
12/30/2015*; 7:00 pm		at Detroit	W 85–68	9–2	Calihan Hall (733); Detroit, MI
MAC regular season
01/02/2016; 2:30 pm, ESPN3		Buffalo	W 67–56	10–2 (1–0)	Convocation Center (1,089); Ypsilanti, MI
01/06/2016; 7:00 pm, ESPN3		Akron	L 65–68 ^{OT}	10–3 (1–1)	Convocation Center (574); Ypsilanti, MI
01/09/2016; 6:00 pm, ESPN3		at Northern Illinois	W 87–80 ^{OT}	11–3 (2–1)	Convocation Center (1,349); DeKalb, IL
01/13/2016; 7:00 pm, ESPN3		Ohio	L 64–71	11–4 (2–2)	Convocation Center (631); Ypsilanti, MI
01/16/2016; 4:30 pm, ESPN3		Kent State	W 72–51	12–4 (3–2)	Convocation Center (1,984); Ypsilanti, MI
01/20/2016; 7:00 pm, ESPN3		at Ball State	L 54–76	12–5 (3–3)	John E. Worthen Arena (844); Muncie, IN
01/23/2016; 2:30 pm, BCSN/ESPN3		Toledo	W 59–41	13–5 (4–3)	Convocation Center (1,928); Ypsilanti, MI
01/27/2016; 7:00 pm, ESPN3		at Bowling Green	L 63–67	13–6 (4–4)	Stroh Center (1,771); Bowling Green, KY
01/30/2016; 2:00 pm		at Akron	L 72–75	13–7 (4–5)	James A. Rhodes Arena (635); Akron, OH
02/03/2016; 7:00 pm, ESPN3		Central Michigan; Michigan MAC Trophy	L 63–67	13–8 (4–6)	Convocation Center (1,771); Ypsilanti, MI
02/06/2016; 2:00 pm, ESPN3		Western Michigan; Michigan MAC Trophy	W 70–66 ^{2OT}	14–8 (5–6)	Convocation Center (672); Ypsilanti, MI
02/13/2016; 2:00 pm, ESPN3		at Miami (OH)	W 70–46	15–8 (6–6)	Millett Hall (586); Oxford, OH
02/17/2016; 7:00 pm, ESPN3		at Buffalo	W 70–55	16–8 (7–6)	Alumni Arena (954); Amherst, NY
02/20/2016; 2:30 pm, ESPN3		Northern Illinois	W 84–60	17–8 (8–6)	Convocation Center (2,257); Ypsilanti, MI
02/24/2016; 7:00 pm, ESPN3		at Toledo	W 58–46	18–8 (9–6)	Savage Arena (3,762); Toledo, OH
02/27/2016; 2:00 pm, ESPN3		Ball State	L 63–67	18–9 (9–7)	Convocation Center (908); Ypsilanti, MI
03/02/2016; 7:00 pm, ESPN3		at Western Michigan; Michigan MAC Trophy	W 63–52	19–9 (10–7)	University Arena (808); Kalamazoo, MI
03/05/2016; 1:00 pm, ESPN3		at Central Michigan; Michigan MAC Trophy	L 70–78	19–10 (10–8)	McGuirk Arena (1,604); Mount Pleasant, MI
MAC Women's Tournament
03/07/2016; 5:00 pm, ESPN3		Kent State; First Round	W 73–60	20–10	Convocation Center (1,075); Ypsilanti, MI
03/09/2016; 7:30 pm, ESPN3		vs. Ball State; Quarterfinals	W 67–53	21–10	Quicken Loans Arena (2,355); Cleveland, OH
03/11/2016; 2:30 pm, TWCSC/BCSN		vs. Central Michigan; Semifinals	L 71–86	21–11	Quicken Loans Arena; Cleveland, OH
WNIT
03/17/2016*; 10:00 pm		at Saint Mary's; First Round	W 74–73	22–11	McKeon Pavilion (250); Moraga, CA
03/19/2016*; 8:00 pm		at TCU; Second Round	L 81–85	22–12	Schollmaier Arena (963); Fort Worth, TX
*Non-conference game. ^{#}Rankings from AP Poll. (#) Tournament seedings in parentheses. All times are in Eastern Time.

== See also ==
- 2015–16 Eastern Michigan Eagles men's basketball team
