= 2015–16 Ohio Bobcats women's basketball team =

Intercollegiate basketball season

2015–16 Ohio Bobcats women's basketball

MAC East Division Champions MAC Regular Season Champions

WNIT, 3rd Round
- Conference: Mid-American Conference
- East Division
- Record: 26–7 (16–2 MAC)
- Head coach: Bob Boldon (3rd season)
- Assistant coaches: Kate Bruce; Tavares Jackson; Mary Evans
- Home arena: Convocation Center

2015–16 Mid-American Conference women's basketball standings
	Conf.				Overall
Team	W		L	PCT	W		L	PCT
East
Ohio	16	–	2	.889	26	–	7	.788
Akron	11	–	7	.611	19	–	14	.576
Buffalo †	8	–	10	.444	20	–	14	.588
Bowling Green	6	–	12	.333	10	–	18	.357
Miami (OH)	3	–	15	.167	9	–	21	.300
Kent State	3	–	15	.167	6	–	23	.207
West
Central Michigan	14	–	4	.778	22	–	11	.667
Ball State	13	–	5	.722	22	–	10	.688
Toledo	12	–	6	.667	17	–	13	.567
Eastern Michigan	10	–	8	.556	22	–	12	.647
Western Michigan	8	–	10	.444	17	–	15	.531
Northern Illinois	4	–	14	.222	11	–	19	.367
† 2016 MAC tournament winner As of March 24, 2016; Rankings from AP poll

The 2015–16 Ohio Bobcats women's basketball team represented Ohio University during the 2015–16 NCAA Division I women's basketball season. The Bobcats, led by third year head coach Bob Boldon, played its home games at the Convocation Center in Athens, Ohio as a member of the Mid-American Conference. They finished the season 26–7, 16–2 in MAC play by winning the East Division title as well as the overall regular season MAC championship. They lost in the quarterfinals of the MAC women's tournament to Buffalo. They received an automatic bid to the Women's National Invitation Tournament where they lost in the third round to Temple.

== Preseason ==
The preseason coaches' poll and league awards were announced by the league office on October 27, 2015. Ohio was unanimously picked to win the MAC East

=== Preseason women's basketball coaches poll ===
(First place votes in parentheses)

==== East Division ====
1. Ohio (12)
2. Akron
3. Bowling Green
4. Miami
5. Buffalo
6. Kent State

==== West Division ====
1. Eastern Michigan (4)
2. Ball State (8)
3. Western Michigan
4. Toledo
5. Central Michigan
6. Northern Illinois

==== Regular Season Champion ====
Ohio (10), Ball State (1), Eastern Michigan (1)

==== Tournament champs ====
Ohio (5), Ball State (3), Eastern Michigan (3), Buffalo (1)

=== Preseason All-MAC ===
Preseason All-MAC teams
Team	Player	Position	Year
Preseason All-MAC East	Kiyanna Black	G	Sr.
Preseason All-MAC East	Quiera Lampkins	G	Jr.

== Roster ==
2015–16 Ohio Bobcats women's basketball team
Players
Coaches

Pos.	#	Name	Height	Year	Hometown
G	0	Taylor Agler	5 ft 9 in (1.75 m)	Jr	Westerville, OH
G	1	Mariah Harris	5 ft 11 in (1.8 m)	RS Sr	Springfield, OH
G	2	Katie Barker	5 ft 10 in (1.78 m)	Fr	Cary, IL
G	3	Dominique Doseck	5 ft 8 in (1.73 m)	Fr	Athens, OH
G	4	Kiyanna Black	5 ft 5 in (1.65 m)	Sr	Columbus, OH
G	5	Quiera Lampkins	5 ft 9 in (1.75 m)	Jr	Gahanna, OH
G	7	Adyn Bucher	—	Jr	Athens, OH
F	10	Lexie Baldwin	6 ft 1 in (1.85 m)	Sr	Hattiesburg, MS
F	11	Kelly Karlis	6 ft 2 in (1.88 m)	RS Fr	Medinah, IL
G	12	Yamonie Jenkins	5 ft 7 in (1.7 m)	Jr	Reynoldsburg, OH
F	13	Olivia Bower	6 ft 1 in (1.85 m)	Fr	Bowerston, OH
F	15	Jasmine Weatherspoon	6 ft 2 in (1.88 m)	Jr	Columbus, OH
F	20	Tmisht Stinson	5 ft 10 in (1.78 m)	Jr	Hattiesburg, MS
F	22	Hannah Boesinger	5 ft 11 in (1.8 m)	Jr	Chagrin Falls, OH
F	42	Destini Cooper	6 ft 1 in (1.85 m)	Jr	Reynoldsburg, OH
F	54	Kendall Jessing	6 ft 0 in (1.83 m)	Fr	Sylvania, OH

Head coach

- Bob Boldon

Assistant coach(es)

- Katie Bruce
- Tavares Jackson
- Mary Evans

Legend

- (C) Team captain
- (S) Suspended
- (I) Ineligible
- (W) Walk-on
- Injured
- Current redshirt

Roster
Last update: January 30, 2016

== Schedule ==
Date time, TV	Rank^{#}	Opponent^{#}	Result	Record	Site (attendance) city, state
Exhibition
11/07/2015*; 11:30 am		Wilmington College	W 97–41		Convocation Center; Athens, OH
Non-conference regular season
11/15/2015*; 3:00 pm		at Illinois	L 53–62	0–1	Parkland Gymnasium (983); Champaign, IL
11/20/2015*; 1:00 pm		vs. Florida Gulf Coast; Akron Classic	W 69–57	1–1	James A. Rhodes Arena (1,556); Akron, OH
11/20/2015*; 12:30 pm		vs. Winthrop; Akron Classic	W 75–54	2–1	James A. Rhodes Arena; Akron, OH
11/27/2015*; 3:30 pm		vs. Indiana; Vanderbilt Thanksgiving Tournament	W 63–56	3–1	Memorial Gymansium (2,447); Nashville, TN
11/28/2015*; 3:30 pm		vs. Vanderbilt; Vanderbilt Thanksgiving Tournament	L 59–62	3–2	Memorial Gymnasium (2,462); Nashville, TN
12/03/2015*; 11:00 am		IPFW	W 79–52	4–2	Convocation Center (1,623); Athens, OH
12/06/2015*; 2:00 pm		St. Francis (PA)	W 91–65	5–2	Convocation Center (873); Athens, OH
12/13/2015*; 2:00 pm		at Duquesne	L 47–64	5–3	Palumbo Center (599); Pittsburgh, PA
12/18/2015*; 2:00 pm		at UNC Wilmington; Seahawks Hampton Inn Christmas Invitational	W 75–59	6–3	Trask Coliseum (364); Wilmington, NC
12/19/2015*; 12:00 pm		vs. East Carolina; Seahawks Hampton Inn Christmas Invitational	W 64–61	7–3	Trask Coliseum; Wilmington, NC
12/29/2015*; 7:00 pm		Middle Tennessee	W 72–49	8–3	Convocation Center (921); Athens, OH
MAC regular season
01/02/2016; 2:00 pm		Western Michigan	W 73–63	9–3 (1–0)	Convocation Center (881); Athens, OH
01/06/2016; 7:00 pm		Ball State	W 73–48	10–3 (2–0)	Convocation Center (834); Athens, OH
01/09/2016; 4:00 pm		at Bowling Green	W 72–57	11–3 (3–0)	Stroh Center (2,097); Bowling Green, OH
01/13/2016; 7:00 pm		at Eastern Michigan	W 71–64	12–3 (4–0)	Convocation Center (631); Ypsilanti, MI
01/16/2016; 2:00 pm		Central Michigan	W 86–84 ^{OT}	13–3 (5–0)	Convocation Center (1,226); Athens, OH
01/20/2016; 7:00 pm		at Kent State	W 93–54	14–3 (6–0)	MAC Center (589); Kent, OH
01/23/2016; 2:00 pm		at Northern Illinois	W 72–47	15–3 (7–0)	Convocation Center (574); Dekalb, IL
01/27/2016; 7:00 pm, ASN/ESPN3		Akron	W 75–55	16–3 (8–0)	Convocation Center (1,522); Athens, OH
01/30/2016; 4:00 pm, ESPN3		at Ball State	W 68–67	17–3 (9–0)	John E. Worthen Arena (1,517); Muncie, IN
02/03/2016; 2:00 pm, BCSN/TWCSC/ESPN3		at Buffalo	L 43–51	17–4 (9–1)	Alumni Arena (818); Buffalo, NY
02/06/2016; 11:30 am		Northern Illinois	W 95–70	18–4 (10–1)	Convocation Center (3,211); Athens, OH
02/13/2016; 2:00 pm, BCSN/TWCSC/ESPN3		at Toledo	W 77–57	19–4 (11–1)	Savage Arena (4,880); Toledo, OH
02/17/2016; 7:00 pm, ASN/ESPN3		Miami (OH)	W 72–44	20–4 (12–1)	Convocation Center (1,631); Athens, OH
02/20/2016; 7:00 pm, BCSN/TWCSC/ESPN3		at Akron	W 101–73	21–4 (13–1)	James A. Rhodes Arena (752); Akron, OH
02/24/2016; 7:00 pm		Kent State	W 86–52	22–4 (14–1)	Convocation Center (1,126); Athens, OH
02/27/2016; 1:00 pm		Buffalo	L 58–70	22–5 (14–2)	Convocation Center (3,326); Athens, OH
03/02/2016; 7:00 pm		Bowling Green	W 75–58	23–5 (15–2)	Convocation Center (1,039); Athens, OH
MAC Tournament
03/09/2016; 12:00 pm, ESPN3	(1)	vs. (8) Buffalo; Quarterfinals	L 60–72	24–6	Quicken Loans Arena; Cleveland, OH
WNIT
03/17/2016*; 7:00 pm		Marshall; First round	W 76–68	25–6	Convocation Center (1,172); Athens, OH
03/20/2016*; 2:00 pm		Virginia Tech; Second round	W 64–57	26–6	Convocation Center (1,131); Athens, OH
03/24/2016*; 7:00 pm		at Temple; Third round	L 61–75	26–7	McGonigle Hall (570); Philadelphia, PA
*Non-conference game. ^{#}Rankings from AP Poll. (#) Tournament seedings in parentheses. All times are in Eastern Time.

== Awards and honors ==
=== Weekly Awards ===
Weekly Award Honors
Honors	Player	Position	Date Awarded	Source
MAC East player of the week	Kiyanna Black	G	December 1	
MAC East player of the week	Quiera Lampkins	G	December 7	
MAC East player of the week	Kiyanna Black	G	December 21	
MAC East player of the week	Quiera Lampkins	G	January 4	
MAC East player of the week	Kiyanna Black	G	January 18	
MAC East player of the week	Kiyanna Black	G	February 15	

=== All-MAC Awards ===
Postseason All-MAC teams
Team	Player	Position	Year
All-MAC 1st team	Kiyanna Black	G	Sr.
All-MAC 2nd team	Quiera Lampkins	G	Jr.
All-MAC Honorable Mention	Lexie Baldwin	F	Sr.
All-MAC Defensive team	Quiera Lampkins	G	Jr.

== See also ==
2015–16 Ohio Bobcats men's basketball team
