= 2016 MAC women's basketball tournament =

- Classification: Division I
- Season: 2015–16
- Teams: 12
- First round site: Campus sites
- Quarterfinals site: Quicken Loans Arena; Cleveland, Ohio
- Semifinals site: Quicken Loans Arena; Cleveland, Ohio
- Finals site: Quicken Loans Arena; Cleveland, Ohio
- Champions: Buffalo (1st title)
- Winning coach: Felisha Legette-Jack (1st title)
- MVP: Stephanie Reid (Buffalo)
- Television: TWCSC (Ohio)
- MAC women's basketball tournaments

2015–16 Mid-American Conference women's basketball standings
	Conf.				Overall
Team	W		L	PCT	W		L	PCT
East
Ohio	16	–	2	.889	26	–	7	.788
Akron	11	–	7	.611	19	–	14	.576
Buffalo †	8	–	10	.444	20	–	14	.588
Bowling Green	6	–	12	.333	10	–	18	.357
Miami (OH)	3	–	15	.167	9	–	21	.300
Kent State	3	–	15	.167	6	–	23	.207
West
Central Michigan	14	–	4	.778	22	–	11	.667
Ball State	13	–	5	.722	22	–	10	.688
Toledo	12	–	6	.667	17	–	13	.567
Eastern Michigan	10	–	8	.556	22	–	12	.647
Western Michigan	8	–	10	.444	17	–	15	.531
Northern Illinois	4	–	14	.222	11	–	19	.367
† 2016 MAC tournament winner As of March 24, 2016; Rankings from AP poll

The 2016 Mid-American Conference women's basketball tournament is a post-season basketball tournament for the Mid-American Conference (MAC) 2015–16 college basketball season. Tournament first-round games were held on campus sites at the higher seed on March 7. The remaining rounds were held at Quicken Loans Arena in Cleveland between March 9–12. The winner of the tournament received the conference's automatic bid into the 2016 NCAA tournament.

Defending champion Ohio earned the #1 seed. Both of Ohio's conference losses had come against eight-seeded Buffalo. The young Bulls defeated #9 seed Bowling Green and then upset Ohio for a third time that season in the quarter-final. Buffalo then defeated fifth-seeded Akron and regular season runner-up Central Michigan to win the tournament championship. Stephanie Reid of Buffalo was the MVP. With the automatic bid, Buffalo lost to Ohio State in the NCAA Tournament.

== Format ==
In the recent tournaments, the top two seeds received byes into the semifinals and the three and four seeds received a bye to the quarterfinals. The tournament reverted to the original structure. The top four seeds received just one bye into the quarterfinals.

== Seeds ==
Seed	School	Conference record	Division	Tiebreaker
1†	Ohio	16–2	East	
2†	Central Michigan	14–4	West	
3†	Ball State	13–5	West	
4†	Toledo	12–6	West	
5	Akron	11–7	East	
6	Eastern Michigan	10–8	West	
7	Western Michigan	8–10	West	
8	Buffalo	8–10	East	
9	Bowling Green	6–12	East	
10	Northern Illinois	4–14	West	
11	Kent State	3–15	East	
12	Miami (OH)	3–15	East	
† – Received a Bye to quarterfinals. Overall record are as of the end of the regular season.

== Schedule ==
Game	Time	Matchup^{#}	Television
First round – Monday March 7
1	5:30 PM	#9 Bowling Green at #8 Buffalo	ESPN3
2	7:00 PM	#12 Miami (OH) at #5 Akron	
3	7:00 PM	#10 Northern Illinois at #7 Western Michigan	ESPN3
4	5:00 PM	#11 Kent State at #6 Eastern Michigan	ESPN3
Quarterfinals – Wednesday March 9
5	Noon	#8 Buffalo vs. #1 Ohio	ESPN3
6	2:30 PM	#5 Akron vs. #4 Toledo	ESPN3
7	5:00 PM	#7 Western Michigan vs. #2 Central Michigan	ESPN3
8	7:30 PM	#6 Eastern Michigan vs. #3 Ball State	ESPN3
Semifinals – Friday March 11
9	Noon	#8 Buffalo vs. #5 Akron	TWCSOH/BCSN
10	2:30 PM	#2 Central Michigan vs. #6 Eastern Michigan	TWCSOH/BCSN
Championship – Saturday March 12
11	1:00 PM	#8 Buffalo vs. #2 Central Michigan	TWCSOH/BCSN
* Game times in ET. # Rankings denote tournament seed

== Bracket ==
First round Monday, March 7
7	Western Michigan	94
10	Northern Illinois	52
6	Eastern Michigan	73
11	Kent State	60
8	Buffalo	60
9	Bowling Green	44
5	Akron	66
12	Miami (OH)	54

Quarterfinals; Wednesday, March 9
2	Central Michigan	66
7	Western Michigan	62
3	Ball State	53
6	Eastern Michigan	67
1	Ohio	60
8	Buffalo	72
4	Toledo	71
5	Akron	73^{OT}

Semifinals; Friday, March 11
2	Central Michigan	86
6	Eastern Michigan	71
8	Buffalo	88
5	Akron	87

Championship; Saturday, March 12
8	Buffalo	73^{OT}
2	Central Michigan	71

First round games at campus sites of lower-numbered seeds

== See also ==
2016 MAC men's basketball tournament
