= 2015–16 Central Michigan Chippewas women's basketball team =

Intercollegiate basketball season

2015–16 Central Michigan Chippewas women's basketball

MAC West Division champions

WNIT, First Round
- Conference: Mid-American Conference
- West Division
- Record: 22–11 (14–4 MAC)
- Head coach: Sue Guevara (9th season)
- Assistant coaches: Heather Oesterle; Raina Harmon; Kristin Haynie
- Home arena: McGuirk Arena

2015–16 Mid-American Conference women's basketball standings
	Conf.				Overall
Team	W		L	PCT	W		L	PCT
East
Ohio	16	–	2	.889	26	–	7	.788
Akron	11	–	7	.611	19	–	14	.576
Buffalo †	8	–	10	.444	20	–	14	.588
Bowling Green	6	–	12	.333	10	–	18	.357
Miami (OH)	3	–	15	.167	9	–	21	.300
Kent State	3	–	15	.167	6	–	23	.207
West
Central Michigan	14	–	4	.778	22	–	11	.667
Ball State	13	–	5	.722	22	–	10	.688
Toledo	12	–	6	.667	17	–	13	.567
Eastern Michigan	10	–	8	.556	22	–	12	.647
Western Michigan	8	–	10	.444	17	–	15	.531
Northern Illinois	4	–	14	.222	11	–	19	.367
† 2016 MAC tournament winner As of March 24, 2016; Rankings from AP poll

The 2015–16 Central Michigan Chippewas women's basketball team represented Central Michigan University during the 2015–16 NCAA Division I women's basketball season. The Chippewas, led by ninth-year head coach Sue Guevara, played their home games at McGuirk Arena as members of the West Division of the Mid-American Conference (MAC). They finished the season 22–11, 11–7 in MAC play, to finish to be champions of the East Division. They advanced to the championship game of the MAC women's tournament where they lost to Buffalo. They were invited to the Women's National Invitation Tournament where they lost in the first round to IUPUI.

== Roster ==
2015–16 Central Michigan Chippewas women's basketball team
Players
Coaches

Pos.	#	Name	Height	Year	Previous school	Hometown
F	33	Gabrielle Bird	6 ft 0 in (1.83 m)	Fr	South Lyon East HS	South Lyon, MI
G	10	Cassie Breen	5 ft 10 in (1.78 m)	So	Woodhaven HS	Woodhaven, MI
G	14	Amani Corley	5 ft 8 in (1.73 m)	So	Southgate Anderson HS	Southgate, MI
F	20	Jewel Cotton	6 ft 2 in (1.88 m)	RS Jr	Harper Woods HS	Harper Woods, MI
F	13	Reyna Frost	6 ft 0 in (1.83 m)	Fr	Reese HS	Reese, MI
G	0	Jasmine Harris	6 ft 1 in (1.85 m)	RS Fr	UMass	Farmington Hills, MI
F	24	Karli Harrington	6 ft 2 in (1.88 m)	So	Hemlock HS	Hemlock, MI
F	23	Aaliah Hill	6 ft 0 in (1.83 m)	Fr	Hamady HS	Flint, MI
G	3	Presley Hudson	6 ft 0 in (1.83 m)	Fr	Wayland University	Wayland, MI
F	15	Chelsea Lynn	6 ft 0 in (1.83 m)	Sr	Martin Luther King HS	Detroit, MI
F	2	Tinara Moore	6 ft 3 in (1.91 m)	So	Southgate Anderson HS	Southgate, MI
G	21	Jeada Robinson	5 ft 8 in (1.73 m)	Fr	Bloomfield Hills Marian	Bloomfield Hills, MI
G	5	Aleah Swary	5 ft 10 in (1.78 m)	So	Northrop HS	Fort Wayne, IN
G	1	Da'Jourie Turner	5 ft 6 in (1.68 m)	Sr	Warren Fitzgerald HS	Detroit, MI

Head coach

- Sue Guevara (Saginaw Valley State)

Assistant coach(es)

- Heather Oesterle (Michigan)
- Raina Harmon (Central Michigan)
- Kristin Haynie (Michigan State)

Legend

- (C) Team captain
- (S) Suspended
- (I) Ineligible
- (W) Walk-on
- Injured
- Current redshirt

Roster
Last update: July 14, 2024

== Schedule and results ==
Date time, TV	Rank^{#}	Opponent^{#}	Result	Record	Site (attendance) city, state
Non-conference games
11/13/2015*; 7:30 p.m., ESPN3		Indiana State	W 85–65	1–0	McGuirk Arena (1,373); Mount Pleasant, MI
11/15/2015*; 3:00 p.m.		at Oakland	W 110–87	2–0	Athletics Center O'rena (853); Rochester, MI
11/19/2015*; 7:00 p.m., ESPN3		Middle Tennessee	W 81–59	3–0	McGuirk Arena (1,483); Mount Pleasant, MI
11/22/2015*; 7:00 p.m., ESPN3		at Loyola-Chicago	W 68–59	4–0	Joseph J. Gentile Arena (204); Chicago, IL
11/27/2015*; 4:00 p.m., ESPN3		at UIC	L 63–66	4–1	UIC Pavilion (269); Chicago, IL
12/03/2015*; 7:00 p.m., ESPN3		Duquesne	L 49–68	4–2	McGuirk Arena (1,450); Mount Pleasant, MI
12/12/2015*; 3:00 p.m.		at Illinois	L 69–74	4–3	State Farm Center (1,557); Champaign, IL
12/15/2015*; 12:00 p.m., ESPN3		Memphis	L 61–64	4–4	McGuirk Arena (3,000); Mount Pleasant, MI
12/21/2015*; 2:00 p.m., ESPN3		SIU Edwardsville	W 78–65	5–4	McGuirk Arena (1,442); Mount Pleasant, MI
12/28/2015*; 3:00 p.m.		vs. Rider; Hawk Classic semifinals	W 76–68	6–4	Hagan Arena (828); Philadelphia, PA
12/29/2015*; 3:00 p.m.		at Saint Joseph's; Hawk Classic championship	L 66–76	6–5	Hagan Arena (743); Philadelphia, PA
Mid-American Conference regular season
01/02/2016; 1:00 p.m., ESPN3		Kent State	W 81–61	7–5 (1–0)	McGuirk Arena (1,526); Mount Pleasant, MI
01/06/2016; 7:00 p.m., ESPN3		at Buffalo	L 61–67	7–6 (1–1)	Alumni Arena (875); Buffalo, NY
01/09/2016; 2:00 p.m.		at Akron	W 97–77	8–6 (2–1)	James A. Rhodes Arena (602); Akron, OH
01/13/2016; 7:00 p.m., ESPN3		Northern Illinois	W 95–63	9–6 (3–1)	McGuirk Arena (1,305); Mount Pleasant, MI
01/16/2016; 2:00 p.m.		at Ohio	L 84–86 ^{OT}	9–7 (3–2)	Convocation Center (1,226); Athens, OH
01/20/2016; 7:00 p.m.		at Miami (OH)	W 72–58	10–7 (4–2)	Millett Hall (230); Oxford, OH
01/23/2016; 1:00 p.m., ESPN3		Akron	W 81–60	11–7 (5–2)	McGuirk Arena (1,896); Mount Pleasant, MI
01/27/2016; 7:00 p.m., ESPN3		Western Michigan; Michigan MAC Trophy	W 53–51	12–7 (6–2)	McGuirk Arena (1,507); Mount Pleasant, MI
01/30/2016; 1:00 p.m., ESPN3		Miami (OH)	W 77–54	13–7 (7–2)	McGuirk Arena (1,600); Mount Pleasant, MI
02/03/2016; 7:00 p.m.		at Eastern Michigan; Michigan MAC Trophy	W 66–65	14–7 (8–2)	Convocation Center (1,333); Ypsilanti, MI
02/06/2016; 1:00 p.m.		Bowling Green	W 76–75	15–7 (9–2)	McGuirk Arena (1,598); Mount Pleasant, MI
02/10/2016; 7:00 p.m.		at Ball State	W 74–65	16–7 (10–2)	John E. Worthen Arena (862); Muncie, IN
02/13/2016; 2:00 p.m.		at Northern Illinois	W 73–67	17–7 (11–2)	Convoncation Center; DeKalb, IL
02/20/2016; 1:00 p.m., ESPN3		Toledo	L 79–81 ^{OT}	17–8 (11–3)	McGuirk Arena (1,913); Mount Pleasant, MI
02/24/2016; 7:00 p.m.		Ball State	W 67–66	18–8 (12–3)	McGuirk Arena (1,272); Mount Pleasant, MI
02/27/2016; 2:00 p.m.		at Western Michigan; Michigan MAC Trophy	W 73–61	19–8 (13–3)	University Arena (1,108); Kalamazoo, MI
03/02/2016; 7:00 p.m.		at Toledo	L 72–76	19–9 (13–4)	Savage Arena (3,866); Toledo, OH
03/05/2016; 1:00 p.m., ESPN3		Eastern Michigan; Michigan MAC Trophy	W 78–70	20–9 (14–4)	McGuirk Arena (1,604); Mount Pleasant, MI
MAC women's tournament
03/09/2016; 5:00 p.m., ESPN3		vs. Western Michigan; Quarterfinals	W 66–62	21–9	Quicken Loans Arena; Cleveland, OH
03/11/2016; 2:30 p.m., TWCSC/BCSN		vs. Eastern Michigan; Semifinals	W 86–71	22–9	Quicken Loans Arena; Cleveland, OH
03/12/2016; 1:00 p.m., TWCSC/BCSN		vs. Buffalo; Championship game	L 71–73 ^{OT}	22–10	Quicken Loans Arena (1,322); Cleveland, OH
WNIT
03/17/2016*; 7:00 p.m., ESPN3		IUPUI; First round	L 55–63	22–11	McGuirk Arena (553); Mount Pleasant, MI
*Non-conference game. ^{#}Rankings from AP poll. (#) Tournament seedings in parentheses. All times are in Eastern.

== See also ==
- 2015–16 Central Michigan Chippewas men's basketball team
