= 2015–16 Toledo Rockets women's basketball team =

Intercollegiate basketball season

2015–16 Toledo Rockets women's basketball

ASU Classic Champions
- Conference: Mid-American Conference
- West Division
- Record: 17–13 (12–6 MAC)
- Head coach: Tricia Cullop (8th season)
- Assistant coaches: Vicki Hall; Tony Greene; Tiffany Swoffard
- Home arena: Savage Arena

2015–16 Mid-American Conference women's basketball standings
	Conf.				Overall
Team	W		L	PCT	W		L	PCT
East
Ohio	16	–	2	.889	26	–	7	.788
Akron	11	–	7	.611	19	–	14	.576
Buffalo †	8	–	10	.444	20	–	14	.588
Bowling Green	6	–	12	.333	10	–	18	.357
Miami (OH)	3	–	15	.167	9	–	21	.300
Kent State	3	–	15	.167	6	–	23	.207
West
Central Michigan	14	–	4	.778	22	–	11	.667
Ball State	13	–	5	.722	22	–	10	.688
Toledo	12	–	6	.667	17	–	13	.567
Eastern Michigan	10	–	8	.556	22	–	12	.647
Western Michigan	8	–	10	.444	17	–	15	.531
Northern Illinois	4	–	14	.222	11	–	19	.367
† 2016 MAC tournament winner As of March 24, 2016; Rankings from AP poll

The 2015–16 Toledo Rockets women's basketball team represented University of Toledo during the 2015–16 NCAA Division I women's basketball season. The Rockets, led by eighth year head coach Tricia Cullop, played their home games at Savage Arena, as members of the West Division of the Mid-American Conference. They finished the season 17–13, 12–6 in MAC play to finish in third place in the West Division. They lost in the quarterfinals of the MAC women's tournament to Akron.

== Roster ==
2015–16 Toledo Rockets women's basketball team
Players
Coaches

Pos.	#	Name	Height	Year	Previous school	Hometown
G	0	Olivia Cunningham	5 ft 7 in (1.7 m)	So	Horn Lake	Horn Lake, MS
G	1	Brenae Harris	5 ft 10 in (1.78 m)	Sr	Marion Harding	Marion, OH
G	2	Mikaela Boyd	5 ft 7 in (1.7 m)	RS Fr	Proviso West	Hillside, IL
G	4	Monique Evans	5 ft 0 in (1.52 m)	Fr	Richmond Heights	Richmond Heights, OH
G/F	5	Sarah St-Fort	5 ft 10 in (1.78 m)	Fr	Dawson College	Montreal, Quebec
G	11	Jay-Ann Bravo-Harriott	5 ft 10 in (1.78 m)	So	Greig City Academy	London, England
F	12	Janice Monakana	6 ft 0 in (1.83 m)	Jr	Greig City Academy	London, England
C	15	Kaayla McIntyre	6 ft 2 in (1.88 m)	Fr	Notre Dame Academy	Toledo, OH
G	22	Halee Printz	5 ft 11 in (1.8 m)	Fr	Tippecanoe	Tipp City, OH
F	24	Michaela Rasmussen	6 ft 1 in (1.85 m)	So	Holy Family	Chaska, MN
F	32	Ana Capotosto	5 ft 10 in (1.78 m)	Sr	Saugatuck	Saugatuck, MI
C	33	Nancy Kessler	6 ft 3 in (1.91 m)	So	St. Francis Secondary	St. Catharines, ON
G/F	35	Jada Woody	6 ft 1 in (1.85 m)	So	Plymouth	Canton, MI
F	42	Lindsay Dorr	6 ft 2 in (1.88 m)	RS Fr	Rogers	Rogers, MN
C	43	Sophie Reecher	6 ft 3 in (1.91 m)	Jr	Byron	Byron, IL

Head coach

- Tricia Cullop (Purdue)

Assistant coach(es)

- Vicki Hall (Texas)
- Tony Greene (Langston)
- Tiffany Swoffard (Austin Peay)

Legend

- (C) Team captain
- (S) Suspended
- (I) Ineligible
- (W) Walk-on
- Injured
- Current redshirt

Roster

== Schedule and results ==
Date time, TV	Rank^{#}	Opponent^{#}	Result	Record	Site (attendance) city, state
Exhibition
11/07/2015*; 12:00 pm		Findlay	W 82–51		Savage Arena; Toledo, OH
Non-conference games
11/14/2015*; 12:00 pm		Arizona	L 59–62	0–1	Savage Arena (3,713); Toledo, OH
11/18/2015*; 7:00 pm		at No. 3 Notre Dame	L 39–74	0–2	Edmund P. Joyce Center (8,474); South Bend, IN
11/21/2015*; 3:00 pm		vs. Albany; URI Tournament	L 55–63	0–3	Ryan Center (417); Kingston, RI
11/22/2015*; 3:00 pm		vs. Harvard; URI Tournament	L 70–76	0–4	Ryan Center (425); Kingston, RI
11/29/2015*; 1:00 pm		at St. Bonaventure	L 63–74	0–5	Reilly Center (378); Olean, NY
12/02/2015*; 11:00 am		Dayton	L 57–83	0–6	Savage Arena (5,830); Toledo, OH
12/05/2015*; 6:30 pm		vs. Columbia; ASU Classic semifinals	W 88–75	1–6	Wells Fargo Arena (1,785); Tempe, AZ
12/06/2015*; 4:30 pm		vs. VCU; ASU Classic championship	W 80–61	2–6	Wells Fargo Arena; Tempe, AZ
12/12/2015*; 2:00 pm		Cleveland State	W 66–53	3–6	Savage Arena (3,618); Toledo, OH
12/20/2015*; 4:00 pm		at UIC	W 60–51	4–6	UIC Pavilion (550); Chicago, IL
12/29/2015*; 7:00 pm		Arkansas–Pine Bluff	W 74–47	5–6	Savage Arena (3,864); Toledo, OH
Mid-American Conference games
01/02/2016; 2:00 pm		at Ball State	L 69–75	5–7 (0–1)	John E. Worthen Arena (907); Muncie, IN
01/06/2016; 7:00 pm		Kent State	W 73–67	6–7 (1–1)	Savage Arena (3,613); Toledo, OH
01/09/2016; 2:00 pm		Western Michigan	W 80–73	7–7 (2–1)	Savage Arena (4,216); Toledo, OH
01/13/2016; 7:00 pm		at Miami (OH)	W 55–50	8–7 (3–1)	Millett Hall (189); Oxford, OH
01/16/2016; 2:00 pm		Northern Illinois	W 66–59	9–7 (4–1)	Savage Arena (4,013); Toledo, OH
01/20/2016; 7:00 pm		at Akron	L 71–81	9–8 (4–2)	James A. Rhodes Arena (578); Akron, OH
01/23/2016; 2:30 pm		at Eastern Michigan	L 41–59	9–9 (4–3)	Convocation Center (1,928); Ypsilanti, MI
01/30/2016; 2:00 pm		Bowling Green	W 76–61	10–9 (5–3)	Savage Arena (4,906); Toledo, OH
02/03/2016; 7:00 pm, ASN/ESPN3		at Western Michigan	W 80–68	11–9 (6–3)	University Arena (687); Kalamazoo, MI
02/06/2016; 5:00 pm		at Kent State	W 67–64	12–9 (7–3)	MAC Center (666); Kent, OH
02/10/2016; 7:00 pm, BCSN/TWCS/ESPN3		Buffalo	W 71–60	13–9 (8–3)	Savage Arena (3,476); Toledo, OH
02/13/2016; 2:00 pm, BCSN/TWCS/ESPN3		Ohio	L 57–77	13–10 (8–4)	Savage Arena (4,880); Toledo, OH
02/17/2016; 7:00 pm, BCSN/TWCS/ESPN3		at Bowling Green	W 68–60	14–10 (9–4)	Stroh Center (2,644); Bowling Green, OH
02/20/2016; 1:00 pm		at Central Michigan	W 81–79 ^{OT}	15–10 (10–4)	McGuirk Arena (1,913); Mount Pleasant, MI
02/24/2016; 7:00 pm, ESPN3		Eastern Michigan	L 46–58	15–11 (10–5)	Savage Arena (3,762); Toledo, OH
02/27/2016; 2:00 pm, ESPN3		at Northern Illinois	W 89–83 ^{OT}	16–11 (11–5)	Convocation Center (760); DeKalb, IL
03/02/2016; 7:00 pm, ESPN3		Central Michigan	W 76–72	17–11 (12–5)	Savage Arena (3,866); Toledo, OH
03/05/2016; 2:00 pm, BCSN/TWCS/ESPN3		at Ball State	L 58–68	17–12 (12–6)	Savage Arena (4,267); Toledo, OH
MAC Women's Tournament
03/09/2016; 2:30 pm, ESPN3		vs. Akron; Quarterfinals	L 71–73	17–13	Quicken Loans Arena; Cleveland, OH
*Non-conference game. ^{#}Rankings from AP Poll. (#) Tournament seedings in parentheses. All times are in Eastern.

== See also ==
- 2015–16 Toledo Rockets men's basketball team
