= 2015–16 Illinois Fighting Illini women's basketball team =

Intercollegiate basketball season

2015–16 Illinois Fighting Illini women's basketball
- Conference: Big Ten Conference
- Record: 9–21 (2–16 B1G)
- Head coach: Matt Bollant (4th season)
- Assistant coaches: LaKale Malone; Tianna Kirkland; Jody Martinez
- Home arena: State Farm Center; Parkland College

2015–16 Big Ten women's basketball standings
	Conf.				Overall
Team	W		L	PCT	W		L	PCT
No. 5 Maryland†	16	–	2	.889	31	–	4	.886
No. 9 Ohio State	15	–	3	.833	26	–	8	.765
No. 16 Michigan State	13	–	5	.722	25	–	9	.735
Indiana	12	–	6	.667	21	–	12	.636
Minnesota	11	–	7	.611	20	–	12	.625
Purdue	10	–	8	.556	20	–	12	.625
Michigan	9	–	9	.500	21	–	14	.600
Nebraska	9	–	9	.500	18	–	13	.581
Iowa	8	–	10	.444	19	–	14	.576
Rutgers	8	–	10	.444	19	–	15	.559
Penn State	6	–	12	.333	12	–	19	.387
Northwestern	4	–	14	.222	18	–	17	.514
Wisconsin	3	–	15	.167	7	–	22	.241
Illinois	2	–	16	.111	9	–	21	.300
† 2016 Big Ten tournament winner As of March 31, 2016; Rankings from AP poll

The 2015–16 Illinois Fighting Illini women's basketball team represented University of Illinois at Urbana–Champaign during the 2015–16 NCAA Division I women's basketball season. The Fighting Illini, led by fourth year head coach Matt Bollant, played their home games at the State Farm Center and are members of the Big Ten Conference. In November 2015, Parkland College in Champaign, Illinois will host Illinois Fighting Illini women's basketball for five games while renovations to the State Farm Center was completed. They finished the season 9–21, 2–16 in Big Ten play to finish in last place. They lost in the first round of the Big Ten women's tournament to Penn State.

== Roster ==
2015–16 Illinois Fighting Illini women's basketball team
Players
Coaches

Pos.	#	Name	Height	Year	Previous school	Hometown
G	0	Sarah Hartwell	5 ft 10 in (1.78 m)	RS Sr	Bellarmine Prep; Georgia Tech	Tacoma, WA
F	4	Simone Law	6 ft 0 in (1.83 m)	RS Sr	Loyola; Loyola–Chicago	South Holland, IL
G	5	Cierra Rice	5 ft 9 in (1.75 m)	Fr	Grosse Point South	Grosse Pointe, MI
G	12	Ashley McConnell	5 ft 9 in (1.75 m)	Jr	Fremd	Palatine, IL
G/F	13	Mikaala Shackelford	5 ft 10 in (1.78 m)	RS So	Hopkins	Plymouth, MN
G	15	Kyley Simmons	5 ft 7 in (1.7 m)	RS Sr	Lewis Central	Council Bluffs, IA
G	21	Brooke Kissinger	5 ft 7 in (1.7 m)	So	Minden	Minden, NE
G	23	Jaelyne Kirkpatrick	5 ft 7 in (1.7 m)	Fr	St. Ignatius of Loyola	Oakville, ON
G	25	Kennedy Cattenhead	5 ft 10 in (1.78 m)	RS So	Bolingbrook	Bolingbrook, IL
C	32	Chatrice White	6 ft 3 in (1.91 m)	So	Shelby	Shelby, NE
F	35	Alex Wittinger	6 ft 1 in (1.85 m)	Fr	Delano	Delano, MN

Head coach

- Matt Bollant (Winona State)

Assistant coach(es)

- LaKale Malone (Indiana)
- Tianna Kirkland (Bethel (IN))
- Jody Martinez (Ferris State)

Legend

- (C) Team captain
- (S) Suspended
- (I) Ineligible
- (W) Walk-on
- Injured
- Current redshirt

Roster

== Schedule ==
Date time, TV	Rank^{#}	Opponent^{#}	Result	Record	Site (attendance) city, state
Exhibition
11/07/2015*; 2:00 pm		Indianapolis	W 95–36		Parkland College; Champaign, IL
Non-conference regular season
11/13/2015*; 7:00 pm		Chicago State	W 67–36	1–0	Parkland College (1,001); Champaign, IL
11/15/2015*; 2:00 pm		Ohio	W 62–53	2–0	Parkland College (983); Champaign, IL
11/21/2015*; 2:00 pm		Tennessee–Martin	W 94–74	3–0	Parkland College (907); Champaign, IL
11/24/2015*; 7:00 pm		Tennessee State	W 98–43	4–0	Parkland College (952); Champaign, IL
12/02/2015*; 6:00 pm, ESPN3		at Miami (FL); ACC–Big Ten Women's Challenge	L 64–73	4–1	BankUnited Center (910); Coral Gables, FL
12/06/2015*; 2:00 pm		Lehigh	W 76–67	5–1	State Farm Center (1,800); Champaign, IL
12/08/2015*; 7:00 pm		Southern Illinois	W 78–64	6–1	State Farm Center (1,317); Champaign, IL
12/12/2015*; 7:00 pm		Central Michigan	W 74–69	7–1	State Farm Center (1,557); Champaign, IL
12/19/2015*; 2:00 pm		at Memphis	L 75–81	7–2	Elma Roane Fieldhouse (593); Memphis, TN
12/22/2015*; 7:00 pm		South Dakota	L 76–85	7–3	State Farm Center (1,573); Champaign, IL
12/28/2015*; 2:00 pm		George Washington	L 57–70	7–4	State Farm Center (1,514); Champaign, IL
Big Ten regular season
12/31/2015; 2:00 pm		No. 6 Maryland	L 63–79	7–5 (0–1)	State Farm Center (1,716); Champaign, IL
01/03/2016; 1:00 pm		at Purdue	L 65–69	7–6 (0–2)	Mackey Arena (6,374); West Lafayette, IN
01/07/2016; 8:00 pm, BTN		Minnesota	L 75–106	7–7 (0–3)	State Farm Center (1,263); Champaign, IL
01/10/2016; 2:00 pm		at Nebraska	L 57–73	7–8 (0–4)	Pinnacle Bank Arena (6,222); Lincoln, NE
01/13/2016; 6:00 pm		at Rutgers	L 54–67	7–9 (0–5)	Louis Brown Athletic Center (1,829); Piscataway, NJ
01/17/2016; 2:00 pm		Wisconsin	W 71–65	8–9 (1–5)	State Farm Center (1,857); Champaign, IL
01/20/2016; 6:00 pm		at Indiana	L 66–68	8–10 (1–6)	Assembly Hall (2,202); Bloomington, IN
01/23/2016; 2:00 pm		Penn State	L 56–65	8–11 (1–7)	State Farm Center (3,776); Champaign, IL
01/26/2016; 8:00 pm, BTN		at Minnesota	L 77–82	8–12 (1–8)	Williams Arena (2,618); Minneapolis, MN
02/01/2016; 6:00 pm, BTN		No. 7 Ohio State	L 70–80	8–13 (1–9)	State Farm Center (1,517); Champaign, IL
02/04/2016; 7:00 pm		Northwestern	L 69–79	8–14 (1–10)	State Farm Center (1,331); Champaign, IL
02/07/2016; 1:00 pm		at Michigan	L 83–96	8–15 (1–11)	Crisler Center (2,509); Ann Arbor, MI
02/10/2016; 7:00 pm		Indiana	L 68–80	8–16 (1–12)	State Farm Center (1,622); Champaign, IL
02/13/2016; 5:00 pm, BTN		Rutgers	L 56–63	8–17 (1–13)	State Farm Center (2,450); Champaign, IL
02/17/2016; 7:00 pm		at Wisconsin	W 76–56	9–17 (2–13)	Kohl Center (3,448); Madison, WI
02/21/2016; 1:00 pm		at No. 5 Ohio State	L 74–117	9–18 (2–14)	Value City Arena (8,247); Columbus, OH
02/24/2016; 7:00 pm		No. 20 Michigan State	L 43–71	9–19 (2–15)	State Farm Center (1,395); Champaign, IL
02/27/2016; 5:00 pm, BTN		at Iowa	L 56–61	9–20 (2–16)	Carver–Hawkeye Arena (4,610); Ann Arbor, MI
Big Ten Women's Tournament
03/02/2016; 3:00 pm, BTN		vs. Penn State; First Round	L 66–75	9–21	Bankers Life Fieldhouse; Indianapolis, IN
*Non-conference game. ^{#}Rankings from AP Poll. (#) Tournament seedings in parentheses. All times are in Central Time.

== See also ==
- 2015–16 Illinois Fighting Illini men's basketball team
