= Lisa Carlsen (basketball) =

American basketball player and coach

Biographical details
- Education: Northwest Missouri State University

Playing career
- 1988–1992: Northwest Missouri State
- 1992–1995: Nebraska Express

Coaching career (HC unless noted)
- 1998–2000: Omaha (asst.)
- 2000–2004: Omaha
- 2004–2007: Winona State (asst.)
- 2007–2015: Lewis
- 2015–2025: Northern Illinois

Head coaching record
- Overall: 318–302 (.513)

Lisa Carlsen is an American women's basketball coach and former basketball player. She was recently the women's basketball head coach at Northern Illinois University. She previously served as the women's basketball head coach at Lewis University and the University of Nebraska Omaha.

== Early life and education ==
Carlson is from Earling, Iowa. She attended Northwest Missouri State University where she played college basketball and was a named all-conference four times. She was named 1992 Champion NCAA Female Athlete of the Year after her senior year. She also played college softball where she earned all-conference and all-region accolades. She earned a bachelor's degree in 1992 and a master's degree in 1994 from Northwest Missouri State. She played basketball professionally in the Women's Basketball Association for three seasons with the Nebraska Express.

== Coaching career ==
Prior to coaching basketball, she was a softball coach at St. Mary (Neb.) from 1994 to 1997 where she was the Midlands Collegiate Athletic Conference Coach of the Year twice. At Wayne State College (Neb.) she was the softball head coach and an assistant volleyball coach from 1997 to 1998. Her overall record as a softball coach was 120–51.

Her first job as a basketball coach was in 1998 as an assistant at Omaha then in NCAA Division II. She was promoted to head coach in 2000 where she remained for four seasons with a record of 36–75.

=== Lewis ===
She was the associate head coach at Winona State for three years before taking the women's basketball head coaching position at Lewis in 2007. In eight seasons at Lewis she posted an overall record of 148–89 with appearances in the NCAA Division II women's basketball tournament and two Great Lakes Valley Conference championships. Her 2015 team went 31–3 and made the Division II Elite Eight. They began the season 23–0. She was named GLVC Coach of the Year and Division II National Coach of the Year. During her tenure with the Flyers the program had a 100 percent graduation rate.

=== Northern Illinois ===
On June 30, 2015 she was named the head coach at Northern Illinois. She led them to the 2017 Women's National Invitation Tournament.

She resigned from NIU on March 10, 2025 after a 13–17 season and a 147–155 record with the Huskies.

== Head coaching record ==
Record table
Season	Team	Overall	Conference	Standing	Postseason
Omaha (North Central Conference) (2000–2004)
2000–01	Omaha	8–18	6–12		
2001–02	Omaha	11–18	7–11		
2002–03	Omaha	12–17	5–11		
2003–04	Omaha	5–22	0–14		
Omaha:		36–75 (.324)	18–48 (.273)		
Lewis (Great Lakes Valley Conference) (2007–2015)
2007–08	Lewis	13–13	9–10		
2008–09	Lewis	16–13	11–7		
2009–10	Lewis	18–12	12–6		
2010–11	Lewis	15–16	7–10		NCAA Division II First Round
2011–12	Lewis	8–20	5–13		
2012–13	Lewis	24–6	14–4	1st	NCAA Division II First Round
2013–14	Lewis	23–6	16–2		NCAA Division II Second Round
2014–15	Lewis	31–3	17–1	1st	NCAA Division II Elite Eight
Omaha:		148–89 (.624)	91–53 (.632)		
Northern Illinois (Mid-American Conference) (2015–2025)
2015–16	Northern Illinois	11–19	4–14	6th (West)	
2016–17	Northern Illinois	21–12	12–6	T-3rd (West)	WNIT First Round
2017–18	Northern Illinois	15–15	7–11	5th (West)	
2018–19	Northern Illinois	19–13	10–8	3rd (West)	
2019–20	Northern Illinois	11–19	7–11	T-5th (West)	
2020–21	Northern Illinois	12–12	10–8	7th	
2021–22	Northern Illinois	14–15	11–9	T-4th	
2022–23	Northern Illinois	16–17	8–10	T-5th	WBI 1st Round
2023–24	Northern Illinois	15–16	8–10	T-6th	
Northern Illinois:		134–138 (.493)	77–87 (.470)		
Total:		318–302 (.513)			
National champion Postseason invitational champion Conference regular season champion Conference regular season and conference tournament champion Division regular season champion Division regular season and conference tournament champion Conference tournament champion

== Personal life ==
She and her ex-husband, Chris, have four children.
