= 2015–16 Western Michigan Broncos women's basketball team =

Intercollegiate basketball season

2015–16 Western Michigan Broncos women's basketball
- Conference: Mid-American Conference
- West Division
- Record: 17–15 (8–10 MAC)
- Head coach: Shane Clipfell (4th season)
- Assistant coaches: Rick Albro; Tangela Smith; Cetera Washington
- Home arena: University Arena

2015–16 Mid-American Conference women's basketball standings
	Conf.				Overall
Team	W		L	PCT	W		L	PCT
East
Ohio	16	–	2	.889	26	–	7	.788
Akron	11	–	7	.611	19	–	14	.576
Buffalo †	8	–	10	.444	20	–	14	.588
Bowling Green	6	–	12	.333	10	–	18	.357
Miami (OH)	3	–	15	.167	9	–	21	.300
Kent State	3	–	15	.167	6	–	23	.207
West
Central Michigan	14	–	4	.778	22	–	11	.667
Ball State	13	–	5	.722	22	–	10	.688
Toledo	12	–	6	.667	17	–	13	.567
Eastern Michigan	10	–	8	.556	22	–	12	.647
Western Michigan	8	–	10	.444	17	–	15	.531
Northern Illinois	4	–	14	.222	11	–	19	.367
† 2016 MAC tournament winner As of March 24, 2016; Rankings from AP poll

The 2015–16 Central Michigan Chippewas women's basketball team represented Western Michigan University during the 2015–16 NCAA Division I women's basketball season. The Broncos, led by fourth year head coach Shane Clipfell, played their home games at University Arena as members of the West Division of the Mid-American Conference. They finished the season 17–15, 8–10 in MAC play to fifth place of the East division. They advanced to the quarterfinals of the MAC women's tournament, where they lost to Central Michigan.

== Roster ==
2015–16 Western Michigan Broncos women's basketball team
Players
Coaches

Pos.	#	Name	Height	Year	Previous school	Hometown
G	1	Meredith Shipman	5 ft 10 in (1.78 m)	Jr	Snider	Fort Wayne, IN
G	2	Alexis Parks	5 ft 4 in (1.63 m)	So	Africentric	Columbus, OH
G	3	Deborah Meeks	5 ft 8 in (1.73 m)	Sr	Benton Harbor; Trinity Valley CC/Kansas State	Benton Harbor, MI
G	4	Deja Wimby	5 ft 7 in (1.7 m)	Fr	Snider	Fort Wayne, IN
F	10	Breanna Mobley	6 ft 1 in (1.85 m)	Fr	Lansing Waverly	Lansing, MI
G	14	Najee Smith	5 ft 8 in (1.73 m)	So	Neuqua Valley	Naperville, IL
G	15	Aneisha Carlisle	5 ft 9 in (1.75 m)	So	Kalamazoo Central	Kalamazoo, MI
G	20	Logan McCane	5 ft 9 in (1.75 m)	Fr	Rockford	Rockford, MI
G/F	22	Meredith Miller	5 ft 10 in (1.78 m)	Fr	Hilliard Bradley	Hilliard, OH
F	24	Miracle Woods	6 ft 0 in (1.83 m)	Sr	Bishop Luers	Fort Wayne, IN
G	30	Alex Morton	5 ft 9 in (1.75 m)	Sr	Mishawaka Penn	Granger, IN
G	32	LaTondra Brooks	5 ft 5 in (1.65 m)	So	Oak Lawn	Oak Lawn, IL
F	33	Marley Hill (I) (redshirt)	6 ft 2 in (1.88 m)	Jr	Africentric; Cincinnati	Cleveland, OH
F	35	Asia Robeson	6 ft 4 in (1.93 m)	So	Kalamazoo Central	Kalamazoo, MI
F	50	Teagan Reeves	6 ft 3 in (1.91 m)	So	Three Rivers	Three Rivers, MI
F	52	Jessica Jessing	6 ft 3 in (1.91 m)	Sr	Sylvania Northview	Sylvania, OH

Head coach

- Shane Clipfell (Eastern Michigan)

Assistant coach(es)

- Rick Albro (Western Michigan)
- Tangela Smith (Iowa)
- Cetera Washington (Michigan State)

Legend

- (C) Team captain
- (S) Suspended
- (I) Ineligible
- (W) Walk-on
- Injured
- Current redshirt

Roster

== Schedule and results ==
Date time, TV	Rank^{#}	Opponent^{#}	Result	Record	Site (attendance) city, state
Exhibition
November 8, 2015*; 3:00 pm		Lake Erie College	W 72–42		University Arena (607); Kalamazoo, MI
Non-conference games
November 13, 2015*; 7:00 pm, ESPN3		UW–Parkside	W 56–49	1–0	University Arena (686); Kalamazoo, MI
November 15, 2015*; 2:00 pm		at No. 24 Michigan State	L 40–78	1–1	Breslin Center (6,270); East Lansing, MI
November 18, 2015*; 7:00 pm, ESPN3		Chicago State	W 65–56	2–1	University Arena (555); Kalamazoo, MI
November 22, 2015*; 3:00 pm		at No. 20 Northwestern	L 62–86	2–2	Welsh-Ryan Arena (652); Evanston, IL
November 24, 2015*; 12:00 pm, ESPN3		at Bradley	W 72–59	3–2	Renaissance Coliseum (1,504); Peoria, IL
November 29, 2015*; 2:00 pm		at IPFW	W 70–48	4–2	Hilliard Gates Sports Center (753); Fort Wayne, IN
December 2, 2015*; 8:00 pm		at Loyola–Chicago	W 68–45	5–2	Joseph J. Gentile Arena (203); Chicago, IL
December 12, 2015*; 2:00 pm, ESPN3		Detroit	W 72–66	6–2	University Arena (731); Kalamazoo, MI
December 19, 2015*; 3:30 pm		vs. Gardner–Webb; Puerto Rico Classic	W 71–44	7–2	Coliseo Rubén Zayas Montañez; Trujillo Alto, PR
December 20, 2015*; 1:15 pm		vs. No. 9 Mississippi State; Puerto Rico Classic	L 68–90	7–3	Coliseo Rubén Zayas Montañez (370); Trujillo Alto, PR
December 21, 2015*; 11:00 am		vs. Florida Gulf Coast; Puerto Rico Classic	L 42–68	7–4	Coliseo Rubén Zayas Montañez; Trujillo Alto, PR
December 30, 2015*; 7:00 pm, ESPN3		Ferris State	W 73–41	8–4	University Arena (993); Kalamazoo, MI
MAC regular season
January 1, 2016; 2:00 pm, ESPN3		at Ohio	L 63–73	8–5 (0–1)	Convocation Center (881); Athens, OH
January 6, 2016; 7:00 pm, ESPN3		Bowling Green	W 74–45	9–5 (1–1)	University Arena (558); Kalamazoo, MI
January 9, 2016; 2:00 pm, ESPN3		at Toledo	L 73–80	9–6 (1–2)	Savage Arena (4,216); Toledo, OH
January 13, 2016; 7:00 pm, ESPN3		Kent State	W 73–52	10–6 (2–2)	University Arena (519); Kalamazoo, MI
January 16, 2016; 2:00 pm, ESPN3		Miami (OH)	W 80–66	11–6 (3–2)	University Arena (795); Kalamazoo, MI
January 20, 2016; 7:00 pm, ESPN3		at Buffalo	W 92–78	12–6 (4–2)	Alumni Arena (851); Amherst, NY
January 23, 2016; 2:00 pm, ESPN3		Ball State	L 53–77	12–7 (4–3)	University Arena (1,092); Kalamazoo, MI
January 27, 2016; 7:00 pm, ESPN3		at Central Michigan; Michigan MAC Trophy	L 51–53	12–8 (4–4)	McGuirk Arena (1,507); Mount Pleasant, MI
January 30, 2016; 2:00 pm, ESPN3		at Kent State	W 65–53	13–8 (5–4)	MAC Center (525); Kent, OH
February 3, 2016; 2:00 pm, ASN/ESPN3		Toledo	L 68–80	13–9 (5–5)	University Arena (687); Kalamazoo, MI
February 6, 2016; 2:00 pm, ESPN3		at Eastern Michigan; Michigan MAC Trophy	L 66–70 ^{2OT}	13–10 (5–6)	Convocation Center (672); Ypsilanti, MI
February 10, 2016; 7:00 pm, ESPN3		at Bowling Green	W 65–49	14–10 (6–6)	Stroh Center (1,578); Bowling Green, OH
February 13, 2016; 2:00 pm, ESPN3		Akron	W 69–65	15–10 (7–6)	University Arena (1,007); Kalamazoo, MI
February 20, 2016; 1:00 pm, ESPN3		at Ball State	L 64–70	15–11 (7–7)	John E. Worthen Arena (1,068); Muncie, IN
February 24, 2016; 7:00 pm, ESPN3		Northern Illinois	L 70–80	15–12 (7–8)	University Arena (462); Kalamazoo, MI
February 27, 2016; 2:00 pm, ESPN3		Central Michigan; Michigan MAC Trophy	L 61–73	15–13 (7–9)	University Arena (1,108); Kalamazoo, MI
March 2, 2016; 7:00 pm, ESPN3		Eastern Michigan; Michigan MAC Trophy	L 52–63	15–14 (7–10)	University Arena (808); Kalamazoo, MI
March 5, 2016; 7:00 pm, ESPN3		at Northern Illinois	W 64–60	16–14 (8–10)	Convocation Center (383); DeKalb, IL
MAC Women's Tournament
March 7, 2016; 7:00 pm, ESPN3		Northern Illinois; First Round	W 94–52	17–14	University Arena (404); Kalamazoo, MI
March 9, 2016; 5:00 pm, ESPN3		vs. Central Michigan; Quarterfinals	L 62–66	17–15	Quicken Loans Arena; Cleveland, OH
*Non-conference game. ^{#}Rankings from AP Poll. (#) Tournament seedings in parentheses. All times are in Eastern Time.

== See also ==
- 2015–16 Western Michigan Broncos men's basketball team
