= 2015–16 Mid-American Conference women's basketball season =

- League: NCAA Division I
- Sport: Basketball
- Teams: 12

Regular season
- Champions: Ohio
- Runners-up: Central Michigan
- Season MVP: Nathalie Fontaine

Tournament
- Champions: Buffalo
- Runners-up: Central Michigan
- Finals MVP: Stephanie Reid

Mid-American women's basketball seasons
- ← 2014–15 2016–17 →

2015–16 Mid-American Conference women's basketball standings
	Conf.				Overall
Team	W		L	PCT	W		L	PCT
East
Ohio	16	–	2	.889	26	–	7	.788
Akron	11	–	7	.611	19	–	14	.576
Buffalo †	8	–	10	.444	20	–	14	.588
Bowling Green	6	–	12	.333	10	–	18	.357
Miami (OH)	3	–	15	.167	9	–	21	.300
Kent State	3	–	15	.167	6	–	23	.207
West
Central Michigan	14	–	4	.778	22	–	11	.667
Ball State	13	–	5	.722	22	–	10	.688
Toledo	12	–	6	.667	17	–	13	.567
Eastern Michigan	10	–	8	.556	22	–	12	.647
Western Michigan	8	–	10	.444	17	–	15	.531
Northern Illinois	4	–	14	.222	11	–	19	.367
† 2016 MAC tournament winner As of March 24, 2016; Rankings from AP poll

The 2015–16 Mid-American Conference women's basketball season began with practices in October 2015, followed by the start of the 2015–16 NCAA Division I women's basketball season in November. Conference play began in January 2016 and concluded in March 2016. Ohio won its second straight regular season title with a record of 16–2 by two games over Central Michigan. Nathalie Fontaine of Ball State was named MAC player of the year.

Top-seeded Ohio entered the MAC tournament as the defending champion. Both of its conference losses had come against eight-seeded Buffalo. The young Bulls defeated #9 seed Bowling Green and then upset Ohio for a third time that season in the quarter-final. Buffalo then defeated fifth-seeded Akron and regular season runner-up Central Michigan to win the tournament championship. Buffalo lost to Ohio State in the NCAA tournament. Ohio, Central Michigan, Ball State, and Akron all qualified for the WNIT.

== Preseason awards ==
The preseason coaches' poll and league awards were announced by the league office on October 27, 2015.

=== Preseason women's basketball coaches poll ===
(First place votes in parentheses)

==== East Division ====
1. Ohio (12)
2. Akron
3. Bowling Green
4. Miami
5. Buffalo
6. Kent State

==== West Division ====
1. Eastern Michigan (4)
2. Ball State (8)
3. Western Michigan
4. Toledo
5. Central Michigan
6. Northern Illinois

==== Regular Season Champion ====
Ohio (10), Ball State (1), Eastern Michigan (1)

==== Tournament champs ====
Ohio (5), Ball State (3), Eastern Michigan (3), Buffalo (1)

=== Honors ===
Honor	Recipient
Preseason All-MAC East	Kiyanna Black, Ohio
Preseason All-MAC East	Anita Brown, Akron
Preseason All-MAC East	Quiera Lampkins, Ohio
Preseason All-MAC East	Erica Donovan, Bowling Green
Preseason All-MAC East	Hannah Plybon, Akron
Preseason All-MAC West	Nathalie Fontaine, Ball State
Preseason All-MAC West	Cha Sweeney, Eastern Michigan
Preseason All-MAC West	Miracle Woods, Western Michigan
Preseason All-MAC West	Jill Morrison, Ball State
Preseason All-MAC West	Jay-Ann Bravo-Harriott, Toledo

== Postseason ==
=== Postseason awards ===
1. Coach of the Year: Sue Guevara, Central Michigan
2. Player of the Year: Nathalie Fontaine, Ball State
3. Freshman of the Year: Presley Hudson, Central Michigan
4. Defensive Player of the Year: Quiera Lampkins, Ohio
5. Sixth Man of the Year: Jewel Cotton, Central Michigan and Kaayla McIntyre, Toledo

=== Honors ===
Honor	Recipient
Postseason All-MAC First Team	Anita Brown, Akron, G
Postseason All-MAC First Team	Nathalie Fontaine, Ball State, G
Postseason All-MAC First Team	JoAnna Smith, Buffalo, G
Postseason All-MAC First Team	Kiyanna Black, Ohio, G
Postseason All-MAC First Team	Brenae Harris, Toledo, G
Postseason All-MAC Second Team	Hannah Plybon, Akron, G
Postseason All-MAC Second Team	Presley Hudson, Central Michigan, G
Postseason All-MAC Second Team	Tinara Moore, Central Michigan, F
Postseason All-MAC Second Team	Cha Sweeney, Eastern Michigan, G
Postseason All-MAC Second Team	Quiera Lampkins, Ohio, G
Postseason All-MAC Third Team	Jill Morrison, Ball State, G
Postseason All-MAC Third Team	Lauren Tibbs, Bowling Green, C
Postseason All-MAC Third Team	Stephanie Reid, Buffalo, G
Postseason All-MAC Third Team	Janay Morton, Eastern Michigan, G
Postseason All-MAC Third Team	Breanna Mobley, Western Michigan
Postseason All-MAC Third Team	Ally Lehman, Northern Illinois, G
Postseason All-MAC Honorable Mention	Jordan Korinek, Kent State, F
Postseason All-MAC Honorable Mention	Lexie Baldwin, Ohio, F
Postseason All-MAC Honorable Mention	Jay-Ann Bravo-Harriott, Toledo, G
Postseason All-MAC Honorable Mention	Janice Monakana, Toledo, F
Postseason All-MAC Honorable Mention	Jessica Jessing, Western Michigan, F
All-MAC Defensive Team	Stephanie Reid, Buffalo, G
All-MAC Defensive Team	Tinara Moore, Central Michigan, F
All-MAC Defensive Team	Janay Morton, Eastern Michigan, G
All-MAC Defensive Team	Quiera Lampkins, Ohio, G
All-MAC Defensive Team	Jasmine Weatherspoon, Ohio, F
All-MAC Freshman Team	Carmen Grande, Ball State, G
All-MAC Freshman Team	Sydney Lambert, Bowling Green, G
All-MAC Freshman Team	Reyna Frost, Central Michigan, F
All-MAC Freshman Team	Presley Hudson, Central Michigan, G
All-MAC Freshman Team	Kaayla McIntyre, Toledo, C

== See also ==
2015–16 Mid-American Conference men's basketball season
