= 2015–16 Northern Illinois Huskies women's basketball team =

Intercollegiate basketball season

2015–16 Northern Illinois Huskies women's basketball
- Conference: Mid-American Conference
- West Division
- Record: 11–19 (4–14 MAC)
- Head coach: Lisa Carlsen (1st season)
- Assistant coaches: Kierra McCleary; John McGinty; Stephanie Smith
- Home arena: Convocation Center

2015–16 Mid-American Conference women's basketball standings
	Conf.				Overall
Team	W		L	PCT	W		L	PCT
East
Ohio	16	–	2	.889	26	–	7	.788
Akron	11	–	7	.611	19	–	14	.576
Buffalo †	8	–	10	.444	20	–	14	.588
Bowling Green	6	–	12	.333	10	–	18	.357
Miami (OH)	3	–	15	.167	9	–	21	.300
Kent State	3	–	15	.167	6	–	23	.207
West
Central Michigan	14	–	4	.778	22	–	11	.667
Ball State	13	–	5	.722	22	–	10	.688
Toledo	12	–	6	.667	17	–	13	.567
Eastern Michigan	10	–	8	.556	22	–	12	.647
Western Michigan	8	–	10	.444	17	–	15	.531
Northern Illinois	4	–	14	.222	11	–	19	.367
† 2016 MAC tournament winner As of March 24, 2016; Rankings from AP poll

The 2015–16 Northern Illinois Huskies women's basketball team represented Northern Illinois University during the 2015–16 NCAA Division I women's basketball season. The Huskies, led by first year head coach Lisa Carlsen, played their home games at the Convocation Center as members of the West Division of the Mid-American Conference. They finished the season 11–19, 4–14 in MAC play and finished last place in the West division.

== Roster ==
2015–16 Northern Illinois Huskies women's basketball team
Players
Coaches

Pos.	#	Name	Height	Year	Previous school	Hometown
F	1	Cassidy Glenn	5 ft 11 in (1.8 m)	RS Jr	Providence Catholic/Presbyterian	New Lenox, IL
G/F	4	Courtney Woods	6 ft 0 in (1.83 m)	Fr	St. Margaret's Anglican School	Brisbane, Australia
G	5	Georgia Breunig	5 ft 10 in (1.78 m)	So	Sauk Prairie	Sauk Prairie, WI
G	10	Shavonné Brewer	5 ft 4 in (1.63 m)	RS So	Rock Island	Rock Island, IL
F	13	Amber Gray	6 ft 1 in (1.85 m)	Jr	Mukwonago	Mukwonago, WI
G	21	Mikayla Voigt	5 ft 9 in (1.75 m)	Fr	Kettle Moraine Lutheran	Slinger, WI
G	24	Lacia Gorman	5 ft 6 in (1.68 m)	RS Sr	Wayne	Fort Wayne, IN
F	25	Kelly Smith	6 ft 1 in (1.85 m)	So	Arrowhead	Hartland, WI
G	31	Ally Lehman	5 ft 10 in (1.78 m)	Jr	Indian Creek	Nineveh, IN
F	32	Netecia Augusta	6 ft 0 in (1.83 m)	RS Sr	Limestone	Peoria, IL
F	33	Jazmine Harris	6 ft 0 in (1.83 m)	RS So	Heritage Christian	West Allis, WI
F	34	Ally May	6 ft 2 in (1.88 m)	Fr	Arrowhead	Hartland, WI
F	40	Renee Sladek	6 ft 1 in (1.85 m)	So	Merrill	Merrill, WI

Head coach

- Lisa Carlsen

Assistant coach(es)

- Kierra McCleary
- John McGinty
- Stephanie Smith

Legend

- (C) Team captain
- (S) Suspended
- (I) Ineligible
- (W) Walk-on
- Injured
- Current redshirt

Roster
Last update: April 24, 2016

== Schedule ==
Date time, TV	Rank^{#}	Opponent^{#}	Result	Record	Site (attendance) city, state
Exhibition
11/07/2015*; 1:00 pm		St. Francis (IL)	W 86–54		Convocation Center (314); DeKalb, IL
Non-conference regular season
11/13/2015*; 5:30 pm		at SIU Edwardsville	L 67–93	0–1	Vadalabene Center; Edwardsville, IL
11/17/2015*; 7:00 pm		Wisconsin Lutheran	W 69–42	1–1	Convocation Center (397); DeKalb, IL
11/24/2015*; 11:00 am		Eastern Illinois	W 79–63	2–1	Convocation Center (212); DeKalb, IL
11/27/2015*; 8:00 pm		vs. Kansas; SMU Thanksgiving Classic semifinals	L 58–66	2–2	Moody Coliseum (718); Dallas, TX
11/28/2015*; 3:00 pm		vs. Cal State Fullerton; SMU Thanksgiving Classic 3rd place game	W 72–49	3–2	Moody Coliseum; Dallas, TX
12/03/2015*; 3:00 pm, ESPN3		at Milwaukee	L 58–73	3–3	UW–Milwaukee Panther Arena (414); Milwaukee, WI
12/13/2015*; 3:00 pm, ESPN3		vs. Illinois State; MVC vs. MAC Basketball Challenge	W 68–59	4–3	iWireless Center (634); Moline, IL
12/16/2015*; 7:00 pm		at Wisconsin	L 62–89	4–4	Kohl Center (3,124); Madison, WI
12/19/2015*; 4:30 pm		Drake	W 89–73	5–4	Convocation Center (1,290); DeKalb, IL
12/21/2015*; 7:00 pm		Bradley	W 68–64	6–4	Convocation Center (409); DeKalb, IL
12/30/2015*; 7:00 pm		at Chicago State	W 68–50	7–4	Emil and Patricia Jones Convocation Center (415); Chicago, IL
MAC regular season
01/02/2016; 4:00 pm		at Akron	W 65–58	8–4 (1–0)	James A. Rhodes Arena (1,386); Akron, OH
01/06/2016; 6:00 pm, ESPN3		at Miami (OH)	L 60–66	8–5 (1–1)	Millett Hall (312); Oxford, OH
01/09/2016; 5:00 pm, ESPN3		Eastern Michigan	L 80–87 ^{OT}	8–6 (1–2)	Convocation Center (1,349); DeKalb, IL
01/13/2016; 6:00 pm, ESPN3		at Central Michigan	L 63–95	8–7 (1–3)	McGuirk Arena (1,305); Mount Pleasant, MI
01/16/2016; 1:00 pm, ESPN3		at Toledo	L 59–66	8–8 (1–4)	Savage Arena (4,013); Toledo, OH
01/20/2016; 7:00 pm, ESPN3		Bowling Green	L 43–58	8–9 (1–5)	Convocation Center (303); DeKalb, IL
01/23/2016; 2:00 pm		Ohio	L 47–72	8–10 (1–6)	Convocation Center (574); DeKalb, IL
01/27/2016; 6:00 pm		at Kent State	L 85–95	8–11 (1–7)	MAC Center (361); Kent, OH
01/30/2016; 1:00 pm, ESPN3		Buffalo	W 76–74	9–11 (2–7)	Convocation Center (407); DeKalb, IL
02/06/2016; 11:30 am		at Ohio	L 70–95	9–12 (2–8)	Convocation Center (3,211); Athens, OH
02/10/2016; 11:00 am		Miami (OH)	W 92–73	10–12 (3–8)	Convocation Center (922); DeKalb, IL
02/13/2016; 1:00 pm, ESPN3		Central Michigan	L 67–73	10–13 (3–9)	Convocation Center; DeKalb, IL
02/17/2016; 7:00 pm, ESPN3		Ball State	L 57–73	10–14 (3–10)	Convocation Center (468); DeKalb, IL
02/20/2016; 1:30 pm, ESPN3		at Eastern Michigan	L 60–84	10–15 (3–11)	Convocation Center (2,257); Ypsilanti, MI
02/24/2016; 6:00 pm, ESPN3		at Western Michigan	W 80–70	11–15 (4–11)	University Arena (462); Kalamazoo, MI
02/27/2016; 1:00 pm, ESPN3		Toledo	L 83–89 ^{OT}	11–16 (4–12)	Convocation Center (760); DeKalb, IL
03/02/2016; 6:00 pm, ESPN3		at Ball State	L 60–64	11–17 (4–13)	John E. Worthen Arena (468); Muncie, IN
03/05/2016; 6:00 pm, ESPN3		Western Michigan	L 60–64	11–18 (4–14)	Convocation Center (462); DeKalb, IL
MAC Women's Tournament
03/07/2016; 6:00 pm, ESPN3		at Western Michigan; First Round	L 52–94	11–19	University Arena (404); Kalamazoo, MI
*Non-conference game. ^{#}Rankings from AP Poll. (#) Tournament seedings in parentheses. All times are in Central Time.

== See also ==
- 2015–16 Northern Illinois Huskies men's basketball team
