= 2015–16 Wisconsin Badgers women's basketball team =

Intercollegiate basketball season

2015–16 Wisconsin Badgers women's basketball
- Conference: Big Ten Conference
- Record: 7–22 (3–15 B1G)
- Head coach: Bobbie Kelsey (5th season)
- Assistant coaches: Jayme Stewart; Sasha Palmer; Anya Covington
- Home arena: Kohl Center

2015–16 Big Ten women's basketball standings
	Conf.				Overall
Team	W		L	PCT	W		L	PCT
No. 5 Maryland†	16	–	2	.889	31	–	4	.886
No. 9 Ohio State	15	–	3	.833	26	–	8	.765
No. 16 Michigan State	13	–	5	.722	25	–	9	.735
Indiana	12	–	6	.667	21	–	12	.636
Minnesota	11	–	7	.611	20	–	12	.625
Purdue	10	–	8	.556	20	–	12	.625
Michigan	9	–	9	.500	21	–	14	.600
Nebraska	9	–	9	.500	18	–	13	.581
Iowa	8	–	10	.444	19	–	14	.576
Rutgers	8	–	10	.444	19	–	15	.559
Penn State	6	–	12	.333	12	–	19	.387
Northwestern	4	–	14	.222	18	–	17	.514
Wisconsin	3	–	15	.167	7	–	22	.241
Illinois	2	–	16	.111	9	–	21	.300
† 2016 Big Ten tournament winner As of March 31, 2016; Rankings from AP poll

The 2015–16 Wisconsin Badgers women's basketball team represented the University of Wisconsin–Madison during the 2015–16 NCAA Division I women's basketball season. The Badgers, led by fifth year head coach Bobbie Kelsey, play their home games at the Kohl Center and are members of the Big Ten Conference. They finished the season 7–22, 3–15 in Big Ten play to finish in fourteenth place. They lost in the first round of the Big Ten women's tournament to Northwestern.

On March 4, Bobby Kelsey was fired. She finished a six-year record at Wisconsin of 47–100.

== Roster ==
2015–16 Wisconsin Badgers women's basketball team
Players
Coaches

Pos.	#	Name	Height	Year	Previous school	Hometown
G	1	Dakota Whyte	5 ft 8 in (1.73 m)	Sr	Notre Dame Catholic	Toronto, ON
F	2	Elizabeth Toye	6 ft 0 in (1.83 m)	Fr	Lindblom Academy	Chicago, IL
G	4	Nicole Bauman	5 ft 10 in (1.78 m)	Sr	Eisenhower	New Berlin, WI
G	5	Roichelle Marble	5 ft 7 in (1.7 m)	RS Fr	East	Des Moines, IA
F/C	11	Marsha Howard	5 ft 10 in (1.78 m)	Fr	Crete Monee	Chicago, IL
G	22	Tessa Cichy	5 ft 10 in (1.78 m)	Sr	Hill-Murray	Somerset, WI
G	23	Cayla McMorris	5 ft 10 in (1.78 m)	So	Park Center	Brooklyn Park, MN
F/C	24	Malayna Johnson	6 ft 4 in (1.93 m)	Jr	Montini Catholic	Bellwood, IL
F/C	25	Michala Johnson	6 ft 3 in (1.91 m)	RS Sr	Montini Catholic; Connecticut	Bellwood, IL
F	32	Michala Crall	6 ft 3 in (1.91 m)	RS Fr	Olathe Northwest	Olathe, KS
F	40	Avyanna Young	6 ft 1 in (1.85 m)	RS Jr	Rufus King; Milwaukee	Milwaukee, WI
C	41	Rosanna Gambino	6 ft 4 in (1.93 m)	RS Sr	Oswego; Kishwaukee College	Oswego, IL

Head coach

- Bobbie Kelsey (Stanford)

Assistant coach(es)

- Jayme Stewart (Missouri Southern)
- Sasha Palmer (Northern Michigan)
- Anya Covington (Wisconsin)

Legend

- (C) Team captain
- (S) Suspended
- (I) Ineligible
- (W) Walk-on
- Injured
- Current redshirt

Roster

== Schedule ==
Date time, TV	Rank^{#}	Opponent^{#}	Result	Record	Site (attendance) city, state
Exhibition
11/08/2015*; 2:00 pm		Minnesota State	W 84–48		Kohl Center (3,199); Madison, WI
11/12/2015*; 7:00 pm		UW–Eau Claire	W 69–49		Kohl Center (3,084); Madison, WI
Non-conference regular season
11/14/2015*; 2:00 pm		Louisiana Tech	W 79–65	1–0	Kohl Center (3,517); Madison, WI
11/18/2015*; 7:00 pm		Drake	L 70–89	1–1	Kohl Center (2,974); Madison, WI
11/22/2015*; 1:00 pm		at Dayton	L 64–87	1–2	UD Arena (2,097); Dayton, OH
11/27/2015*; 6:00 pm		at San Diego State; San Diego State Classic	W 54–52	2–2	Viejas Arena; San Diego, CA
11/29/2015*; 4:30 pm		vs. Delaware; San Diego State Classic	L 57–63 ^{OT}	2–3	Viejas Arena (284); San Diego, CA
12/02/2015*; 6:00 pm, ESPN3		at Wake Forest; ACC–Big Ten Women's Challenge	W 64–51	3–3	LJVM Coliseum (382); Winston-Salem, NC
12/06/2015*; 2:00 pm		at Marquette	L 61–77	3–4	Al McGuire Center (2,043); Milwaukee, WI
12/10/2015*; 7:00 pm, BTN		Florida	L 75–91	3–5	Kohl Center (3,019); Madison, WI
12/13/2015*; 2:00 pm		Green Bay	L 58–72	3–6	Kohl Center (5,688); Madison, WI
12/16/2015*; 7:00 pm		Northern Illinois	W 89–62	4–6	Kohl Center (3,124); Madison, WI
Big Ten regular season
12/31/2015; 2:00 pm		Indiana	W 73–69	5–6 (1–0)	Kohl Center (4,410); Madison, WI
01/03/2016; 1:00 pm		at No. 24 Michigan State	L 67–77	5–7 (1–1)	Breslin Center (6,950); East Lansing, MI
01/07/2016; 6:00 pm		at Rutgers	L 41–61	5–8 (1–2)	Louis Brown Athletic Center (1,873); Piscataway, NJ
01/10/2016; 3:00 pm, BTN		Penn State	W 82–62	6–8 (2–2)	Kohl Center (3,470); Madison, WI
01/13/2016; 7:00 pm		Iowa	L 54–57	6–9 (2–3)	Kohl Center (3,235); Madison, WI
01/17/2016; 2:00 pm		at Illinois	L 65–71	6–10 (2–4)	State Farm Center (1,857); Champaign, IL
01/20/2016; 7:00 pm		No. 5 Maryland	L 65–90	6–11 (2–5)	Kohl Center (2,954); Madison, WI
01/23/2016; 11:00 am, BTN		Minnesota	L 77–84	6–12 (2–6)	Kohl Center (4,002); Madison, WI
01/27/2016; 7:00 pm		at Nebraska	L 62–75	6–13 (2–7)	Pinnacle Bank Arena (5,349); Lincoln, NE
01/31/2016; 3:00 pm		No. 18 Michigan State	L 54–77	6–14 (2–8)	Kohl Center (9,436); Madison, WI
02/04/2016; 6:00 pm		at Ohio State	L 61–87	6–15 (2–9)	Value City Arena (4,267); Columbus, OH
02/08/2016; 6:00 pm, BTN		Purdue	W 64–57	7–15 (3–9)	Kohl Center (3,149); Madison, WI
02/11/2016; 6:00 pm		at Michigan	L 65–82	7–16 (3–10)	Crisler Center (1,777); Ann Arbor, MI
02/14/2016; 1:00 pm		at Indiana	L 57–67	7–17 (3–11)	Assembly Hall (3,362); Bloomington, IN
02/17/2016; 7:00 pm		Illinois	L 56–76	7–18 (3–12)	Kohl Center (3,448); Madison, WI
02/20/2016; 1:00 pm, BTN		Northwestern	L 53–71	7–19 (3–13)	Kohl Center (3,942); Madison, WI
02/25/2016; 5:30 pm		at No. 6 Maryland	L 77–83	7–20 (3–14)	Xfinity Center (4,147); College Park, MD
02/28/2016; 1:00 pm		at Purdue	L 48–68	7–21 (3–15)	Mackey Arena (7,146); West Lafayette, IN
Big Ten Conference Women's Tournament
03/02/2016; 12:30 pm, BTN		vs. Northwestern; First Round	L 72–76	7–22	Bankers Life Fieldhouse; Indianapolis, IN
*Non-conference game. ^{#}Rankings from AP Poll. (#) Tournament seedings in parentheses. All times are in Central Time.

== See also ==
2015–16 Wisconsin Badgers men's basketball team
