= Spectrum Sports (Ohio) =

- Country: United States
- Broadcast area: Cleveland, Ohio, Columbus, Ohio, Cincinnati, Ohio, Dayton, Ohio, Akron, Ohio & surrounding areas
- Network: Spectrum Sports
- Headquarters: Columbus, Ohio

Ownership
- Owner: Charter Communications
- Sister channels: Spectrum Sports (New York), Spectrum Sports (Wisconsin), Spectrum Sports (Kansas City), Spectrum SportsNet (Los Angeles); Spectrum Sports (Florida)

History
- Launched: September 1998; 26 years ago (central Ohio), April 2004; 20 years ago (SW Ohio), August 2006; 18 years ago (NE Ohio), September 2009; 15 years ago (statewide)
- Closed: January 2019; 6 years ago
- Replaced by: Spectrum News 1 (Ohio)
- Former names: TWTV, Time Warner Cable Sports 24, Time Warner NE Ohio Network (NEON), Central Ohio Sport! TV, Time Warner Cable Sports Channel

Links
- Website: Northeast Ohio; Mid Ohio; Southwest Ohio

Spectrum Sports was a regional sports network serving Ohio and parts of northern Kentucky, southern Michigan and western Pennsylvania operated by Charter Communications through its acquisition of Time Warner Cable in May 2016. It was broadcast on Channel 311 and 1311 exclusively on Time Warner Cable/Charter systems.

== History ==
The channel began in September 1998 in Columbus, Ohio as a partnership between Insight Communications and Time Warner Inc. (now WarnerMedia) through its then-owned Time Warner Cable unit called "Central Ohio Sport! Television." Similar channels debuted in February 2004 to Dayton and in 2006 to Cincinnati as TWTV and in Cleveland and Akron/Canton, Ohio as NEON. In August 2012 the service replaced four regional part-time sports channels (Central Ohio Sport! Television, TWTV, Time Warner Cable Sports 24, and NE Ohio Network) into a three-zoned statewide sports network that serves 83 of Ohio's 88 counties.

On November 17 and 18, 2015, the network aired Before The League, a documentary series on the history of professional American football in Ohio.

It was the broadcaster of the Columbus Crew, one of the original Major League Soccer franchises; Mid-American Conference college football and basketball including University of Akron, Bowling Green State University, University at Buffalo, The State University of New York, Kent State University, Miami University, Ohio University, Ball State University, Central Michigan University, Eastern Michigan University, Northern Illinois University, University of Toledo, and Western Michigan University; Wright State Raiders, Dayton Flyers basketball; and the Ohio High School Athletic Association. The channel airs supplemental local shows, smaller collegiate sports, and other minor professional sports within the Ohio, Kentucky, Pennsylvania franchise areas of Time Warner Cable.

In January 2019, the channel was shut down, as part of a larger effort to divert their resources to the new Spectrum News 1 channels. Ohio High School Athletic Association football championships will move to the new channel, which launched November 2018.

== Programming ==
The network held the rights to:

- Columbus Crew SC Major League Soccer
- Mid-American Conference basketball and football
- Ohio High School Athletic Association high school games weekly, playoffs and championships
- Miami Redhawks hockey
- Dayton Flyers men's basketball
- Columbus Clippers and Toledo Mud Hens (International League baseball)
