= 2016 NCAA Division I women's basketball tournament =

Women's basketball tournament

- Season: 2015–16
- Teams: 64
- Finals site: Bankers Life Fieldhouse, Indianapolis, Indiana
- Champions: UConn Huskies (11th title, 11th title game, 17th Final Four)
- Runner-up: Syracuse Orange (1st title game, 1st Final Four)
- Semifinalists: Oregon State Beavers (1st Final Four); Washington Huskies (1st Final Four)
- Winning coach: Geno Auriemma (11th title)
- MOP: Breanna Stewart (UConn)

The 2016 NCAA Division I women's basketball tournament was played between March and April 2016, with the Final Four played April 3 & 5. The regional locations were four neutral sites: Bridgeport, Connecticut; Dallas, Texas; Lexington, Kentucky; and Sioux Falls, South Dakota. The Final Four was played at Bankers Life Fieldhouse in Indianapolis. UConn won their fourth consecutive national championship, defeating Syracuse 82–51.

This was the last Women's Final Four to be played on the then Sunday/Tuesday schedule. Starting in 2017, the Final Four was changed to a Friday/Sunday schedule, which it used from its inception in 1982 through 1990, then again from 1996 through 2002. Tennessee continued its record streak of making every NCAA women's basketball tournament at 35 consecutive appearances. UConn also continued its record streak of nine consecutive Final Four appearances.

As of the 2025 tournament, this is the only one where all four Final Four teams were coached by men.

== Tournament procedure ==
Pending any changes to the format, a total of 64 teams will enter the 2016 tournament. 32 automatic bids shall be awarded to each program that wins their conference's tournament. The remaining 36 bids are "at-large", with selections extended by the NCAA Selection Committee. The tournament is split into four regional tournaments, and each regional has teams seeded from 1 to 16, with the committee ostensibly making every region as comparable to the others as possible. The top-seeded team in each region plays the #16 team, the #2 team plays the #15, etc. (meaning where the two seeds add up to 17, that team will be assigned to play another).

The basis for the subregionals returned to the approach used between 1982 and 2002; the top sixteen teams, as chosen in the bracket selection process, hosted the first two rounds on campus.

The Selection Committee will also seed the entire field from 1 to 64.

== Schedule and venues ==
The first two rounds, also referred to as the subregionals were played at the sites of the top 16 seeds, as was done in 2015.

First and Second rounds (Subregionals)

2016 NCAA subregionals: Fri/Sun (green), Sat/Mon (blue)
- March 18 and 20
  - Colonial Life Arena, Columbia, South Carolina (Host: South Carolina)
  - Gill Coliseum, Corvallis, Oregon (Host: Oregon State)
  - KFC Yum! Center, Louisville, Kentucky (Host: Louisville)
  - Value City Arena, Columbus, Ohio (Host: Ohio State)
  - Wells Fargo Arena, Tempe, Arizona (Host: Arizona State)
  - Humphrey Coliseum, Starkville, Mississippi (Host: Mississippi State)
  - Carrier Dome, Syracuse, New York (Host: Syracuse)
  - Ferrell Center, Waco, Texas (Host: Baylor)
- March 19 and 21
  - Edmund P. Joyce Center, Notre Dame, Indiana (Host: Notre Dame)
  - Pauley Pavilion, Los Angeles, California (Host: UCLA)
  - Memorial Coliseum, Lexington, Kentucky (Host: Kentucky)
  - Xfinity Center, College Park, Maryland (Host: Maryland)
  - Maples Pavilion, Stanford, California (Host: Stanford)
  - Harry A. Gampel Pavilion, Storrs, Connecticut (Host: Connecticut)
  - Reed Arena, College Station, Texas (Host: Texas A&M)
  - Frank Erwin Center, Austin, Texas (Host: Texas)

Regional semifinals and finals (Sweet Sixteen and Elite Eight)

2016 NCAA Regionals (blue) and Final Four (red) (Hover over city to see link to arena)
- March 25 and 27
  - Lexington Regional, Rupp Arena, Lexington, Kentucky (Host: University of Kentucky)
  - Sioux Falls Regional, Denny Sanford Premier Center, Sioux Falls, South Dakota (Host: Summit League)
- March 26 and 28
  - Bridgeport Regional, Webster Bank Arena, Bridgeport, Connecticut (Hosts: Fairfield University and University of Connecticut)
  - Dallas Regional, American Airlines Center, Dallas, Texas (Host: Big 12 Conference)

National semifinals and championship (Final Four and championship)

- April 3 and 5
  - Bankers Life Fieldhouse, Indianapolis, Indiana (Hosts: Horizon League and Indiana University – Purdue University Indianapolis)

This was the third time that Indianapolis hosted a Women's Final Four Basketball tournament; the prior times were in 2005 and 2011.

== Notables ==
Princeton became the first Ivy League team to ever receive an at-large bid in either the Division I men's or women's tournament. Notably, this came in the last season in which the Ivy League did not hold a postseason tournament.

Tennessee received a #7 seed, the lowest in program history until it received a #10 seed in 2026.

Kentucky had the chance to play all of its regional games in its home city. The subregional was held on the Kentucky campus at the women's primary home of Memorial Coliseum, and the regional was held at Rupp Arena, normally home to the Kentucky men's team but also an occasional home for the women's team, in downtown Lexington.

Five teams made their first-ever tournament appearance: Buffalo, Central Arkansas, Duquesne, Iona, and Jacksonville. Only Duquesne was an at-large entry; the others all won their conference tournaments.

Upsets were the theme of the day on the first round of Sweet 16 play. In all four contests, the lower seated team knocked off the higher seeded team. Fourth-seeded Syracuse took out the number one seed in their region, South Carolina. Fourth-seeded Stanford defeated the number one seed in their region, Notre Dame. Seventh-seeded Washington played third-seeded Kentucky on their own (secondary) court and won the game — becoming the first team to win a true road game in the Sweet Sixteen round since North Carolina defeated Arizona State in 2005 — to move on to the Elite Eight. Seventh-seeded Tennessee defeated the third-seeded Ohio State. This left two four seeds and two seven seeds in the two regions playing on this day.

== Subregionals tournament & automatic qualifiers ==
=== Automatic qualifiers ===
The following teams automatically qualified for the 2016 NCAA field by virtue of winning their conference's tournament (except for the Ivy League, whose regular-season champion received the automatic bid).

Conference	Team	Appearance	Last bid
ACC	Notre Dame	23rd	2015
America East	Albany	5th	2015
American	Connecticut	28th	2015
Atlantic 10	George Washington	17th	2015
Atlantic Sun	Jacksonville	1st	Never
Big 12	Baylor	15th	2015
Big East	St. John's	10th	2014
Big Sky	Idaho	4th	2014
Big South	UNC Asheville	2nd	2007
Big Ten	Maryland	24th	2015
Big West	Hawaii	6th	1998
Colonial	James Madison	12th	2015
C-USA	Middle Tennessee	18th	2014
Horizon	Green Bay	16th	2015
Ivy League	Penn	4th	2014
MAAC	Iona	1st	Never
MAC	Buffalo	1st	Never
MEAC	North Carolina A&T	3rd	2009
Missouri Valley	Missouri State	14th	2006
Mountain West	Colorado State	6th	2002
Northeast	Robert Morris	4th	2014
Ohio Valley	Belmont	2nd	2007
Pac-12	Oregon State	8th	2015
Patriot	Army	3rd	2014
SEC	South Carolina	13th	2015
Southern	Chattanooga	14th	2015
Southland	Central Arkansas	1st	Never
SWAC	Alabama State	3rd	2015
Summit	South Dakota State	7th	2015
Sun Belt	Troy	2nd	1997
WAC	New Mexico State	4th	2015
West Coast	San Francisco	4th	1997

=== Tournament seeds ===
Bridgeport RegionalWebster Bank Arena, Bridgeport, Connecticut
Seed	School	Conference	Record	RPI	Berth type
1	UConn	American	32–0	3	Auto
2	Texas	Big 12	28–4	7	At-Large
3	UCLA	Pac-12	24–8	10	At-Large
4	Michigan State	Big Ten	24–8	17	At-Large
5	Mississippi State	Southeastern	26–7	24	At-Large
6	South Florida	American	23–9	21	At-Large
7	BYU	West Coast	26–6	16	At-Large
8	Seton Hall	Big East	23–8	39	At-Large
9	Duquesne	Atlantic 10	27–5	18	At-Large
10	Missouri	Southeastern	21–9	45	At-Large
11	Colorado State	Mountain West	31–1	41	Auto
12	Chattanooga	Southern	24–7	40	Auto
13	Belmont	Ohio Valley	24–8	77	Auto
14	Hawaii	Big West	21–10	105	Auto
15	Alabama State	Southwestern	19–11	220	Auto
16	Robert Morris	Northeast	20–12	174	Auto

Lexington RegionalRupp Arena, Lexington, Kentucky
Seed	School	Conference	Record	RPI	Berth type
1	Notre Dame	Atlantic Coast	31–1	1	Auto
2	Maryland	Big Ten	30–3	8	Auto
3	Kentucky	Southeastern	23–7	13	At-Large
4	Stanford	Pac-12	24–7	9	At-Large
5	Miami (FL)	Atlantic Coast	24–8	25	At-Large
6	Oklahoma	Big 12	21–10	32	At-Large
7	Washington	Pac-12	22–10	33	At-Large
8	Georgia	Southeastern	21–9	35	At-Large
9	Indiana	Big Ten	20–11	46	At-Large
10	Penn	Ivy	24–4	27	Auto
11	Purdue	Big Ten	20–11	66	At-Large
12	South Dakota State	Summit	26–6	50	Auto
13	San Francisco	West Coast	21–11	72	Auto
14	UNC Asheville	Big South	26–6	120	Auto
15	Iona	Metro Atlantic	23–11	103	Auto
16	North Carolina A&T	Mid Eastern	19–11	195	Auto

Dallas RegionalAmerican Airlines Center, Dallas, Texas
Seed	School	Conference	Record	RPI	Berth type
1	Baylor	Big 12	33–1	2	Auto
2	Oregon State	Pac-12	28–4	5	Auto
3	Louisville	Atlantic Coast	25–7	14	At-Large
4	Texas A&M	Southeastern	21–9	19	At-Large
5	Florida State	Atlantic Coast	23–7	15	At-Large
6	DePaul	Big East	25–8	29	At-Large
7	Oklahoma State	Big 12	21–9	30	At-Large
8	St. John's	Big East	23–9	42	Auto
9	Auburn	Southeastern	19–12	57	At-Large
10	St. Bonaventure	Atlantic 10	23–7	34	At-Large
11	James Madison	Colonial	27–5	31	Auto
12	Middle Tennessee	C-USA	24–8	59	Auto
13	Missouri State	Missouri Valley	24–9	79	Auto
14	Central Arkansas	Southland	28–3	90	Auto
15	Troy	Sun Belt	20–12	119	Auto
16	Idaho	Big Sky	24–9	123	Auto

Sioux Falls RegionalDenny Sanford Premier Center, Sioux Falls, South Dakota
Seed	School	Conference	Record	RPI	Berth type
1	South Carolina	Southeastern	31–1	4	Auto
2	Arizona State	Pac-12	25–6	6	At-Large
3	Ohio State	Big Ten	24–7	11	At-Large
4	Syracuse	Atlantic Coast	25–7	12	At-Large
5	Florida	Southeastern	22–8	26	At-Large
6	West Virginia	Big 12	24–9	22	At-Large
7	Tennessee	Southeastern	19–13	28	At-Large
8	George Washington	Atlantic 10	26–6	23	Auto
9	Kansas State	Big 12	18–12	48	At-Large
10	Green Bay	Horizon	28–4	20	Auto
11	Princeton	Ivy	23–5	36	At - Large
12	Albany	America East	27–4	44	Auto
13	Army	Patriot	29–2	61	Auto
14	Buffalo	Mid American	20–13	106	Auto
15	New Mexico State	Western Athletic	26–4	93	Auto
16	Jacksonville	Atlantic Sun	22–10	134	Auto

== Tournament records ==
- Ohio State's Kelsey Mitchell attempted 22 free throws in a second-round game against West Virginia, the most free throws ever attempted in an NCAA tournament game
- Texas A&M's Anriel Howard recorded 27 rebounds in a first-round game against Missouri State, the most rebounds in an NCAA tournament game
- UConn scored 41 points in the first period of the first-round game against Robert Morris, the most points scored in a single period of an NCAA tournament game
- UConn recorded 129 assists in the tournament, the most by a single team since assists were recorded starting in 1985.

== Games ==
=== Bridgeport Regional, Bridgeport, CT ===
==== First round ====
- The Huskies had a 22–0 run in the first quarter on their way to a 41–4 first-quarter lead. Samuelson scored 22 points, representing the most ever points by a Connecticut Husky in their first NCAA tournament game. Stewart recorded three blocks, the second of which moved her past Rebecca Lobo for first place on the all-time list for Connecticut. She also had eight steals and 18 points. The Colonials outscored the Huskies in the final quarter when the starters for Connecticut were on the bench, but the game outcome was not in doubt as the Huskies won 101–49.
- Duquesne took on Seton Hall in their first ever NCAA tournament invitation. The first quarter featured a lot of scoring as the Seton Hall Pirates scored 24 points but the Duquesne Dukes more than matched them with 33. After defensive adjustments by both teams, the second quarter progressed differently, with the Dukes scoring only 10 while holding the Pirates to 13. Duquesne had as much as a 13-point lead in the second quarter but Seton Hall cut the halftime lead to six, then cut the lead to four in the third quarter. Then the Dukes went on a 15–0 run to open up a comfortable lead. Freshman Kadri-Ann Lass scored 20 points, while Deva'Nyar Workman had a career-high 25 points. The Dukes went on to win the game 97–76.
- The Chattanooga Lady Mocs started out strong against Mississippi State, leading the Bulldogs 16–11 at the end of the first quarter. The fifth seed team would not normally be playing on their home court. However, the fourth-seeded Michigan State had a scheduling conflict so Mississippi State was given the hosting honors. In the second quarter Mississippi State outscored the Lady Mocs by 13 to take the lead. Although Chattanooga would pull within 3 points part way through the fourth quarter, the Bulldogs scored seven consecutive points to put the game out of reach and won the game 60–50.
- Michigan State held a slim three point lead over Belmont at the end of the first quarter. The Bruins would take a brief lead in the second quarter, but Michigan State responded with a 10-point run. The game remained close, with the Spartans up by only four points at the half and five points at the end of the third quarter. Michigan State opened the fourth quarter with a 10–0 run to extend the lead and went on to win 74–60. Aerial Powers scored 27 points to become the all-time leading scorer for Michigan State with 1,803 career points.
- South Florida's leading scorer Courtney Williams did not start in their game against Colorado State. The Rams were leading the Bulls 10–1 almost 5 minutes into the game when Williams came off the bench to play. She ended up scoring 31 points to help lead South Florida to a close victory over Colorado State 48–45. The head coach of South Florida, José Fernandez did not explain the reason that Williams did not start.
- UCLA took on Hawai’i and used their stifling defense to open up a large lead against the Rainbow Wahine. The Bruins held Hawai’i scoreless for over six minutes as part of a 23–6 run which opened up a 17-point lead in the second quarter. Although Hawai’i closed the margin to 11 points in the third quarter they could get no closer, and UCLA ended up with the win 66–50.
- BYU held a slim two point lead over Missouri at the end of the first quarter, but fell behind in the second quarter as the Tigers took a four-point lead into halftime. In the third quarter Missouri's Sophie Cunningham showed why she won the SEC freshman of the year honors, scoring 16 of her 20 points in the third quarter. That opened up a double-digit lead, and while the Cougars cut the lead to two points with just over two minutes to play, the Tigers held on for the win 78–69, their first win in the tournament since 2001.
- The Longhorns started off strong opening up a 17–4 lead early in the game. The Lady Hornets ended a drought of almost 7 minutes with two three-pointers to cut the lead back to five points. The Longhorns slowly stretched the lead in the second quarter. Texas outscored Alabama State 26–5 in the third quarter to put the game out of reach. Empress Davenport scored 13 points to help Texas win the game 86–42.

==== Second round ====
- After watching UConn outscore Robert Morris 41–4 in the first quarter of the first-round game, Duquesne head coach Dan Burt wanted to make sure his team came out with intensity in the first five minutes. He got his wish as the Dukes, after falling behind 13–9, took a 14–13 lead in the first quarter. Seventeen seconds later, Moriah Jefferson would hit a three, one of 6 threes she would hit in eight attempts, and the Huskies would retake the lead they would never give up. Seniors Jefferson, Tuck and Stewart, who of played together for four years were playing the last game in Gampel Pavilion. They went out in style scoring 20, 20 and 21 points respectively. Stewart had five blocks, three of which came on a single defensive possession. The Dukes ended up with nine three-pointers only one fewer than the Huskies, but Connecticut dominated in other facets of the game and earned the trip to the Sweet 16 with a score of 97–51.
- The all MSU matchup between the fourth and fifth seeds was played on home court of the fifth seed due to a scheduling conflict for Michigan State. Mississippi State had a two-point lead at the end of the first quarter and extended it to six points at the half. The Spartans came back in the third quarter to take a lead over the Bulldogs at the end of the third quarter. The game was tied at 69 points each when Mississippi State's Breanna Richardson, who had only hit two three-pointers all season, hit a three-pointer to give the Bulldogs a three-point lead with 34 seconds left in the game. Michigan State missed two chances to tie the game late. Although a Mississippi State player stepped out of bounds during a chaotic scramble the miscue was missed by the referees and Mississippi State ended with the win 74–72. Victoria Vivians scored 24 points for Mississippi State.
- UCLA outscored South Florida by four points in the first quarter and 12 in the second quarter to take a 16-point lead at the half. They did so without much of a contribution from Jordin Canada who missed 10 of her first 11 shots. In the third quarter, USF came back, outscoring the Bruins by 13. Courtney Williams scored 29 for the Bulls, including a three-pointer with less than a minute left to cut the lead to two. Canada's shooting returned in the fourth quarter as she hit six of seven field-goal attempts to help UCLA hold on for the win 72–67.
- Everyone in the starting lineup of Missouri was at least 6 feet tall but Texas used the speed and aggressive defense of the guards to counter the Tigers. Although the Longhorns missed the first seven field-goal attempts, they then went on a 17–3 run to open up and a point lead at the end of the first quarter which they expanded to 15 at the end of the half. Missouri's Sophie Cunningham scored 23 points, but it was not enough for the Tigers as Arielle Atkins scored 22 points and Lashann Higgs contributed 11 points coming in off the bench. This was the first time in the NCAA tournament for Missouri since 2006. The Tigers cut the lead to 11 points early in the fourth quarter but the Longhorns quickly responded and ended with a 73–55 win and a trip to the Sweet 16.

==== Sweet Sixteen ====
- UConn took on Mississippi State for the first time in program history. UConn lost to Georgia in 1996 in their first ever matchup, but has not lost in first time matchups since. Teams learn that seeing the Huskies on tape is different than seeing them live. 84 teams since the Georgia team have played UConn for the first time and lost. Mississippi State became the 85th. UConn scored 13 points before Mississippi State recorded their first point. Mississippi State had a reputation as a defensive team, holding opponents to under 55 points per game. UConn reached 55 with over a minute left in the second quarter of the game. At the end of the third quarter Connecticut was up 84–20 and the coach took out all the starters. The Bulldogs would outscore the Huskies in the final quarter but the damage was done and UConn won the game 98–38; the 60 point margin is the largest margin of victory in a sweet 16 or later game, breaking the 51 point margin set by Connecticut against Texas in the prior year.
- UCLA did not make the NCAA tournament in 2015 but they did go to the WNIT which they won. With two wins in the 2016 tournament they came into the game against Texas on an eight-game postseason winning streak. Texas did play in the 2015 tournament losing in the sweet 16 round to UConn, but wanted to improve upon that performance. Early in the game was all UCLA who opened up a 10-point lead, helped in part by two fouls each on Texas's 6’7” and 6’5” posts, Imani Boyette and Kelsey Lang, forcing them to sit. The Bruins still held a six-point lead at the end of the third quarter. However the Longhorns opened the fourth quarter with a 10–0 run to take the lead. Boyette recorded a double-double with 18 points and 10 rebounds to help the team come from behind to defeat UCLA 72–64.

==== Elite 8 ====
- UConn played Texas for the chance to go to the Final Four. The two teams had played in the prior year's tournament in the Sweet 16 game. In that game, the Huskies outscored the Longhorns 32–4 in the first quarter. This year, the Huskies were leading but near the end of the first quarter led by a mere two points. The Huskies responded, led by five points at the end of the quarter and extended the lead to 15 points at halftime. In the second half, Connecticut expanded the lead to 21 points but then Texas hit three-pointers on three consecutive trips cutting the lead to 12 points. The Huskies clamped down on defense and held the Longhorns to only five points in the next 5 1/2 minutes. The Huskies went on to win 86–65, which earned a record ninth consecutive Final Four appearance.

==== Bracket ====
First round Round of 64; March 18–19
1	UConn	101
16	Robert Morris	49
Storrs, CT – Sat/Mon
8	Seton Hall	76
9	Duquesne	97
5	Mississippi State	60
12	Chattanooga	50
Starkville, MS – Fri/Sun
4	Michigan State	74
13	Belmont	60
6	South Florida	48
11	Colorado State	45
Los Angeles, CA - Sat/Mon
3	UCLA	66
14	Hawaii	50
7	BYU	69
10	Missouri	78
Austin, TX – Sat/Mon
2	Texas	86
15	Alabama State	42

Second Round; Round of 32; March 20–21
1	UConn	97
9	Duquesne	51
5	Mississippi State	74
4	Michigan State	72
6	South Florida	67
3	UCLA	72
10	Missouri	55
2	Texas	73

Regional semifinals Sweet 16; March 26
1	UConn	98
5	Mississippi State	38
3	UCLA	64
2	Texas	72

Regional Final; Elite 8 March 28
1	UConn	86
2	Texas	65

==== Bridgeport Regional Final ====
ESPN

March 28
7:00 PM EDT

Summary

Connecticut 86, Texas 65
Scoring by quarter: 22–17, 24–14, 20–16, 20–18
Pts: M. Tuck 22; Rebs: B. Stewart 13; Asts: M. Jefferson 9	Pts: A. Atkins 19; Rebs: I. Boyette, E. Davenport 7 Asts: C. Rodrigo 7

Webster Bank Arena, Bridgeport, CT
Attendance: 9,088
Referees: Mark Zentz, Maj Forsberg, Ed Sidlasky

==== Bridgeport Regional all tournament team ====
- Breanna Stewart (Connecticut) (Most Outstanding Player)
- Moriah Jefferson (Connecticut)
- Morgan Tuck (Connecticut)
- Ariel Atkins (Texas)
- Lashann Higgs (Texas)

=== Dallas Regional, Dallas, TX ===
==== First round ====
- Baylor's Alexis Jones hit a three pointer on the first shot of the game. It has been some time since she played in an NCAA tournament game; three years ago she played as a freshman with Duke, but in her sophomore year she tore her ACL and missed postseason. She transferred to Baylor but did not play last year while recovering from surgery. She ended up with 23 points to help the Lady Bears beat Idaho 89–59. Idaho was one of the leading three point teams second in the nation with 341 made three-pointers but they missed the first nine shots before connecting with a three-pointer. The vandals were down 30–9 by the end of the first quarter. While they outscored Baylor by four points in the second quarter the Bears responded and outscored the vandals in each of the final two periods.
- Auburn opened up an 11-point lead at 15–4 within the first five minutes of the game. Although St. John's would play the Tigers even from that point on, the game ended with the same 11 point margin. Defense was the name of the game as Auburn forced 25 turnovers. The Tigers freshman Janiah McKay scored 24 points, a career-high.
- Florida State had won their first round tournament game in every one of their prior 13 appearances, but found themselves down to Middle Tennessee at the end of the first quarter. The Seminoles would lead at the half but only by three points. The game remain close until part way through the third quarter when Florida State went on an 11–4 run. The Seminoles extended the lead to as many as 20 points. Florida State's Leticia Romero scored 17 points to help the Seminoles keep their first round streak intact, eating the Blue Raiders 72–55.
- Texas A&M faced Missouri state without two of their players. Courtney Williams, normally a starter, and Shlonte Allen were both suspended indefinitely for a violation of team rules. The Aggies were only up two points at the end of the first quarter; and the Lady Bears played the Aggies even in the second quarter so the Aggies went into halftime with only a two-point lead. In the third quarter, Texas A&M outscored Missouri State 29–14 to open up a comfortable lead. Courtney Walker scored 29 points for the Aggies, while Anriel Howard set an NCAA tournament record with 27 rebounds to help Texas A&M beat the Lady Bears 74–65.
- DePaul took 13 three point shots in the first half of the game and connected with eight of them. Overall they hit 61% of the field-goal attempts to open up a 25-point lead at the half. The 55 points and the field-goal percentage were season highs for each statistic for the first half of a game. While the blue Demons often slowed in the second half they still made three more three-pointers and extended the lead. James Madison Dukes were unable to keep pace. DePaul ended with the win 97–67.
- Louisville's start to the game mirrored their start to the season. They started slow, and were still trailing at the end of the first quarter. The Sugar Bears from Central Arkansas, playing in their very first NCAA tournament game, led 25–22 after 10 minutes of play. The Cardinals reverted to form in the second quarter scoring 17 consecutive points to take a commanding lead. Central Arkansas had been on a nine-game winning streak but Louisville ended that streak, winning the game 87–60. Myisha Hines-Allen scored 25 points for the Cardinals. Louisville head coach Jeff Walz has never lost the first round of an NCAA tournament game, winning their ninth opening-round game. Walz's winning percentage in the tournament is .741, which is third-best among active coaches trailing only Geno Auriemma (.858) and Kim Mulkey (.750).
- St. Bonaventure opened up a six-point lead over Oklahoma State in the first quarter, played roughly even for the next two quarters, and outscored the Cowgirls by six in the final quarter to earn the upset victory 65–54. This is only the second appearance in the tournament for the Bonnies, who made it to the Sweet 16 in their last appearance in 2012.
- Two Oregon State players recorded double doubles. Sydney Wiese scored 10 points and 10 rebounds, while Ruth Hamblin had 18 points and 18 rebounds, shooting six of seven from the field. The Beavers held the Troy Trojans to just four points in the first quarter. Oregon State outscored Troy by at least seven in each of the subsequent three quarters to win easily 73–31.

==== Second round ====
- Baylor opened strongly against the Auburn Tigers. A 12–0 run in the second quarter put the Bears up 37–10 and the game was never close. Baylor's Nina Davis tied her season-high with 30 points, while her freshman teammate Kalani Brown scored 16 points. Baylor hasn't lost to an unranked opponent at home since they were beaten by Auburn 13 years ago in the WNIT final. They were never in danger of repeating that result on this day as Baylor ended up with the win 84–52, sending them to the Sweet 16 for the eighth consecutive year.
- Florida State took on Texas A&M, who were playing without two suspended players: their starter Courtney Williams as well as Shlonte Allen. Florida State opened an 11-point lead in the first quarter and extended it to 21 by the half. In the second half the Aggies cut the lead down to 10 points with about two minutes left in the game. Florida State's Adut Bulgak urged her teammates “not to let up”. They responded and scored the last eight points of the game. The Seminoles won, 74–56.
- The Louisville Cardinals started the season 1–4, but won 25 of the next 29 games to earn a three seed. DePaul outscored Louisville in each of the first three quarters and led by 10 points with eight and half minutes to go in the game but the Cardinals fought back and tied the game with just under three minutes to go. After both teams hit free throws, the Blue Demons were up by two points when Louisville's Briahanna Jackson hit a layup to tie the game. Jessica January was fouled and hit one of two free throws to give DePaul a one-point lead. Louisville had the ball for the final possession, but Myisha Hines-Allen was called for a charge with under two seconds left in the game when trying to drive to tie up the game. Now DePaul's ball, they advanced the ball to midcourt and tried an inbounds pass which was stolen by Louisville's Mariya Moore, but she only had time to attempt a three-quarter-court heave which fell short. January scored a season-high 25 points, every one of which was needed as DePaul won 73–72.
- Oregon State's Jamie Weisner scored only two points in the first game of the tournament but she made up for it in the game against St. Bonaventure, scoring 23 points. The Beavers outscored the Bonnies by five points in the first quarter, again by five points in the second quarter for really opened it up in the third quarter scoring 21 points and holding St. Bonaventure to four points. Ruth Hamblin recorded 16 rebounds as Oregon State defeated St. Bonaventure 69–40.

==== Sweet 16 ====
- Florida State was taking on the number one seed in the Dallas region, Baylor, with the knowledge that President Barack Obama had picked Florida State as an upset. He looked prescient early in the game; almost 3 minutes into the game, Florida State's Kai James stole a ball leading to a three-pointer and a 12–9 lead. The Baylor coach Kim Mulkey quickly called a timeout. The team responded and at the end of the quarter the Lady Bears had a nine-point lead over the Seminoles. They extended the lead in the second quarter, adding another seven points to hold a 16-point lead at the half. Nina Davis scored 30 points, her second 30-point game in the tournament. Baylor went on to win 70–58.
- DePaul opened up an early 9–2 lead over Oregon State while Oregon State's Jamie Weisner missed her first three shots at the basket. After her teammate Sydney Wiese hit consecutive three-point baskets to cut the lead to a single point and Deven Hunter scored to give the Beavers the lead, Weisner scored the final 11 points of the quarter. Weisner would go on to score 38 points, including seven three-pointers, both career-highs, two and 83–71 victory over Depaul. Jessica January scored 20 points for DePaul, but it was not enough, as Oregon State went on to win the game to earn a spot in their first ever regional final.

==== Elite 8 ====
- Baylor scored the first four points in the game against Oregon State, but the Beavers responded to take the lead. The Beavers opened up an eight-point lead when the Lady Bears cut the margin to a single point, but the Beavers scored eight straight points to go to the half with a nine-point lead. Oregon State led much of the second half, but the game was tied 57 points apiece when there were 34 seconds left in the game. After a foul Sydney Wiese made one of two free throws to give the Beavers a one-point lead. Baylor missed a shot and when Ruth Hamblin secured the rebound Baylor had to foul. Wiese hit both free throws to give Oregon State a three-point lead. Baylor attempted a three-pointer with one second left in the game but failed to score so Oregon State won the regional and a trip to their first ever Final Four.

==== Bracket ====
First round Round of 64; March 18–19
1	Baylor	89
16	Idaho	59
Waco, TX – Fri/Sun
8	St. John's	57
9	Auburn	68
5	Florida State	72
12	Middle Tennessee	55
College Station, TX – Sat/Mon
4	Texas A&M	74
13	Missouri State	65
6	DePaul	97
11	James Madison	67
Louisville, KY – Fri/Sun
3	Louisville	87
14	Central Arkansas	60
7	Oklahoma State	54
10	St. Bonaventure	65
Corvallis, OR – Fri/Sun
2	Oregon State	73
15	Troy	31

Second Round; Round of 32; March 20–21
1	Baylor	84
9	Auburn	52
5	Florida State	74
4	Texas A&M	56
6	DePaul	73
3	Louisville	72
10	St. Bonaventure	40
2	Oregon State	69

Regional semifinals Sweet 16; March 26
1	Baylor	78
5	Florida State	58
6	DePaul	71
2	Oregon State	83

Regional Final; Elite 8 March 28
1	Baylor	57
2	Oregon State	60

==== Dallas Regional Final ====
ESPN

March 28
9:00 PM EDT

Summary

Baylor 57, Oregon State 60
Scoring by quarter: 11–16, 14–18, 22–14, 10–12
Pts: A. Jones 19; Rebs: N. Johnson 7 Asts: A. Jones 6	Pts: S. Wiese 18; Rebs: R. Hamblin 12; Asts: S. Wiese 6

American Airlines Center, Dallas, TX
Attendance: 6,050
Referees: Lisa Mattingly, Carla Fountain, Kyle Bacon

==== Dallas Regional all tournament team ====
- Jamie Weisner (Oregon State) (Most Outstanding Player)
- Sydney Wiese (Oregon State)
- Nina Davis (Baylor)
- Alexis Jones (Baylor)
- Jessica January (DePaul)

=== Lexington Regional, Lexington, KY ===
==== First-round ====
- Notre Dame scored the first seven points of the game against North Carolina A&T, and open up a 25–13 lead at the end of the first quarter. The Fighting Irish scored more points in the second quarter and even more in the third. Notre Dame recorded 29 assists the most they have ever recorded in an NCAA tournament game. The Aggies were overwhelmed by the defense and the crowd reaction and were never in the game. Notre Dame finished with the win 95–61.
- Indiana hadn't been to the tournament since 2002, and hadn't won a game in 33 years. That changed after their game against Georgia. The Hoosiers’ Tyra Buss scored 17 of her 23 points in the second half to help lead her team to a 65–58 victory over the Bulldogs. Hoosiers were the only team in the Big Ten to go undefeated at home winning all 14 games. They won 20 games in the regular-season to set a school record.
- The third quarter was the key to the game between Miami and South Dakota State. Miami outscored the Jackrabbits in the first quarter, played them almost even in the second quarter and outscored them in the fourth quarter, but were outscored by nine in the third quarter. The game was close at the end; Miami was coming back, forcing 22 turnovers with the trapping full-court press. South Dakota State struggled from the field near the end of the game but held on for the upset 74–71.
- San Francisco wasn't even expecting to be in the tournament after ending the regular-season as the sixth-place finisher in the West Coast Conference but they ended up winning the conference and earned the automatic bid. The committee matched the team up with Stanford, setting up a match between the coach of Stanford and one of her best players, Jennifer Azzi, who played for Stanford helping them win a national championship, and going on to play for Tara VanDerveer on the 1996 Olympic team. Azzi is now the head coach of the San Francisco Dons. San Francisco kept the game within five points at the end of the first quarter but the Cardinal doubled up the Dons in the second quarter and opened up a large lead. Stanford went on to win 85–58.
- Oklahoma's Vionise Pierre-Louis blocked seven shots, a career-high against Purdue. Her seven blocks contributed to a school record 13 blocks in the NCAA tournament. Her teammate Peyton Little scored 20 points to help the sooners beat the boilermakers 61–45. Oklahoma ended the first quarter with a seven-point lead added to the lead in the second and third quarters and coasted to the victory.
- Kentucky held UNC Asheville to 21% field-goal shooting, while hitting 50% of their own attempts. The combination of strong defense and solid offense contributed to a 54-point margin of victory, the biggest margin of victory in an NCAA tournament game for the Wildcats in school history. Makayla Epps hit 10 of her 20 field-goal attempts and ended up with 24 points. The final score was 85–31.
- The Ivy League teams have not recorded many wins in the tournament, but the Penn Quakers were trying to be the third I’ve the team to record a win. They held the Washington Huskies to just seven points in the first quarter, limiting Washington to only three made shots on 18 attempts. The Huskies cut into the lead in the second quarter but were still trailing at halftime, and still behind near the end of the third quarter. However, Washington's offense returned with the help of Kelsey Plum who scored 24 points and led the come back against the Quakers to secure the win 65–53.
- Maryland opened up a 10-point lead in the first quarter against Iona, who were playing in their first NCAA tournament. The Terrapins extended the lead to 19 points but the Gaels fought back. Iona's Philecia Gilmore scored 21 points with seven three-pointers, the last of which closed the margin to seven points with just under nine minutes left in the game. Maryland's coach Brenda Frese was unhappy that the team was struggling to stay focused. They hadn't played in two weeks after winning the Big Ten championship, and were showing some signs of rust. However, Maryland turned up the pressure and ended up with a 16-point win 74–58.

==== Second round ====
- Notre Dame had a 10-point lead over Indiana at the half, but took some time to put away the Indiana Hoosiers, who matched the Fighting Irish in the third quarter to keep the margin at 10. Late in the third quarter, Notre Dame started a 15–2 run to help put the game away. Notre Dame's Lindsay Allen scored 22 points a season-high to help the Fighting Irish defeat the Hoosiers 87–70. Indiana's Karlee McBride, who scored 17 points for the Hoosiers, is the younger sister of Kayla McBride a former standout for Notre Dame.
- Although the South Dakota State Jackrabbits were outscored in the first and second quarters, they outscored Stanford by 10 points in the third quarter to take the lead. They continue to hold the lead as the game came down to the final seconds. With 18 seconds left in the game, Lili Thompson attempted a three-pointer which would give the Cardinal the lead but it did not go in. However, she didn't dwell on the miss and completed a driving layup with eight seconds left in the game. She was fouled on the play, and converted the free throw to give Stanford a lead — their first lead since early in the third quarter. The jackrabbits had the ball for a final attempt to retake the lead, but with two seconds left, Erica McCall blocked the shot attempt to save the game. Stanford won 66–65.
- Oklahoma kept the game against Kentucky close in the first quarter, with the Wildcats holding only a one-point margin at the end of the quarter. Kentucky extended the lead in the second quarter by an additional seven points. In the third quarter, Kentucky's Makayla Epps took a hard fall, landing on her shoulder, and while she would return to the game, her teammate Janee Thompson thought she was hurting so decided to step up. Thompson scored 16 points including a stretch of nine consecutive points. Oklahoma only hit 17% of their shots in the fourth quarter and fell to the Wildcats 79–58.
- Washington started strong in their game against Maryland, leading the Terrapins by 8 at the end of the first quarter. Maryland more than made up for that in the second quarter, outscoring the Huskies 23–10 to take a five-point lead at the half. The third quarter belong to Washington as they scored 20 points and held Maryland to eight. The Huskies’ Kelsey Plum scored 32 points and helped to lead Washington to the win over Maryland 74–65. Although Washington only finished fifth and Pac-12 conference and struggle to get by Penn in the first round they forced 15 turnovers and held Maryland to 37% shooting from the field. The Huskies now have a lifetime record of 3–0 against Maryland.

==== Sweet 16 ====
- Stanford has a rich basketball history, but this year didn't seem to be at the same level as some past teams. They lost seven games, far more than usual and lost in the Pac 12 tournament to Washington. Although they won the first two games in the tournament, they were now facing one of the number one seeds in Notre Dame. However, the Cardinal embraced their underdog status and opened up a seven-point lead in the first quarter which they extended to 10 by the half. They hit almost 56% of the shots, and 55% of their three-point attempts. The shooting percentage was the highest against Notre Dame the season. Erica McCall scored 27 points, a career-high. The Cardinal led most of the way with as much as a 15-point lead at times. The Irish cut the lead to three points with just over two minutes left in the game, but then with the time expiring Karlie Samuelson banked in a long three-pointer. Notre Dame was unable to take the lead and Stanford ended with the win 90–84.
- Washington took on Kentucky in Rupp Arena, technically not a home court for the Wildcats because they only played two regular-season games there in 2015–16, but nonetheless a home environment. The Huskies opened up a five-point lead at the end of the first quarter, and the two teams played evenly in the second quarter. In the third quarter the Huskies outscored the Wildcats by nine to take a 14-point lead at the end of the quarter. Talia Walton scored 30 points for Washington, Kelsey Plum had 23 points, while Chantel Osahor notched a double-double with 19 points and 17 rebounds. Kentucky had 13 more field-goal attempts than Washington but the Huskies hit 59% of the shots in the second half (49% for the entire game). Washington won the game 85–72, becoming the first team to win a true road game in the Sweet Sixteen round since 2005.

==== Elite 8 ====
- Washington took on Stanford and the regional final of the Lexington region for a chance to go to the Final Four. The two Pac 12 teams had met twice earlier in the year, with Stanford beating Washington at home in the regular-season, and Washington beating Stanford in the Pac 12 tournament. The Huskies started outscoring the first 12 points of the game, and led the Cardinal at the end of the first quarter 22–7. Stanford outscored Washington in the second quarter but only cut four points off the lead. The fourth quarter, Stanford attempted to come back and cut the lead to four points 67–63 with a little over seven minutes left in the game. The Cardinal had the ball and a chance to cut the lead further but Kelsey Plum stole the ball and Washington scored to increase the lead to six points. Stanford came back again but were unable to take the lead. Chantel Osahor had a double double with 24 points and 18 rebounds and was selected the region's most outstanding player. Kelsey Plum contributed 26 points and eight assists as the Huskies defeated the Cardinal 85–76.

==== Bracket ====
First round Round of 64; March 19
1	Notre Dame	95
16	North Carolina A&T	61
South Bend, IN
8	Georgia	58
9	Indiana	62
5	Miami (FL)	71
12	South Dakota State	74
Stanford, CA
4	Stanford	85
13	San Francisco	58
6	Oklahoma	61
11	Purdue	45
Lexington, KY
3	Kentucky	85
14	UNC Asheville	31
7	Washington	65
10	Penn	53
College Park, MD
2	Maryland	74
15	Iona	58

Second Round; Round of 32; March 21
1	Notre Dame	87
9	Indiana	70
12	South Dakota State	65
4	Stanford	66
6	Oklahoma	58
3	Kentucky	79
7	Washington	74
2	Maryland	65

Regional semifinals Sweet 16; March 25
1	Notre Dame	84
4	Stanford	90
3	Kentucky	72
7	Washington	85

Regional Final; Elite 8 March 27
4	Stanford	76
7	Washington	85

==== Lexington Regional Final ====
ESPN

March 27
1:00 PM EDT

Summary

Stanford 76, Washington 85
Scoring by quarter: 10–22, 19–15, 22–26, 25–22
Pts: L. Thompson 19; Rebs: E. McCall 15; Asts: M. Sniezek 6	Pts: K. Plum 26; Rebs: C. Osahor 18; Asts: K. Plum 8

Rupp Arena, Lexington, Kentucky
Attendance: 3,349
Referees: Jesse Dickerson, Karen Preato, Chuck Gonzalez

==== Lexington Regional all tournament team ====
- Chantel Osahor (Washington) (Most Outstanding Player)
- Kelsey Plum (Washington)
- Talia Walton (Washington)
- Erica McCall (Stanford)
- Lili Thompson (Stanford)

=== Sioux Falls Regional, Sioux Falls, SD ===
==== First round ====
- South Carolina hit just two of their first nine shots against the Jacksonville Dolphins. Head coach Dawn Staley had a strong message for her team, telling them to "pound the ball in the paint". The Gamecocks have post players Alaina Coates and A'ja Wilson who are 6-foot-4 and 6-foot-5 while the Dolphins have no player taller than 6–1. The two players each went on to record a double-double with 22 points for Coates and 15 for Wilson. South Carolina scored 15 points in the first quarter and increased scoring in each quarter after. The Gamecocks went on to win the game 77–41.
- The Buffalo Bulls scored the first five points of the game against Ohio State, but the lead was short-lived. Ohio State led at the end of the first quarter 30–12. They extended the lead by another seven points to lead by 25 points at the half. Although the Bulls outscored the Buckeyes in the fourth quarter, they were too far behind and Ohio State ended up with the win 88–69. Kelsey Mitchell scored 27 points for Ohio State who had to play without Ameryst Alston who had been injured in the Big Ten tournament.
- On the opening play of the game, Arizona State's Katie Hempen hit a three-pointer. The next time down the court, she hit another three-pointer and would go on to hit all six of her attempts, tying an NCAA record. The Aggies from New Mexico State fell behind early and never caught up. The Aggies were in their second consecutive NCAA tournament. Arizona State earned the two seed, the highest they have received in the history of the program. The Sun Devils won the game 74–52.
- Syracuse's strength is their swarming defense, which was effective against the Black Knights of Army. Dave Magarity, the coach of Army said "we face that kind of defense probably never... It's just overwhelming at times". The defense held Army to just four points in the first quarter. The Black Knights came into the tournament with a 19-game winning streak. Their senior guard, Kelsey Minato was the first player at the school, either men or women, to have their jersey retired while still active. She came into the game with a long streak of double digit scoring. Although she was scoreless in the first half, she ended up with 10 points, the last two of which came with just over 10 seconds left in the game, to extend her double digits going straight to 112 games. Syracuse opened up a lead of as much as 30 points in the first half and coasted to a victory 73–56.
- Princeton was not playing in their first NCAA tournament, but it was the first time an Ivy League team had been invited as an at-large team. They started off strong, opening up a lead of as much as eight points against West Virginia early, although the Mountaineers managed to take a one-point lead at the half. West Virginia hit only 28% of their field-goal attempts in the first half but managed to increase that to more than 50% in the second half. The Tigers kept the score close for most of the game, but West Virginia ended up with the win 74–65.
- The Albany Great Danes took on Florida in a 12-5 matchup. Albany had appeared in four previous NCAA tournaments without a win, although they were close in the 2015 tournament, losing 54–52 to Duke. They started well against the Gators, with a small two point lead at the end of the first quarter. Florida came out strong in the second quarter outscoring the great Danes 25–8. Albany's leading scorer Shereesha Richards played only 22 minutes. She had limited minutes in the first half with foul trouble and fouled out of the game with 6:18 left in the game. The Great Danes had closed the margin to seven points when she fouled out, but the team rallied around her absence and scored 11 consecutive points. With 11 seconds left in the game, the Great Danes had a two-point lead and the ball. Zakiya Saunders drove for a shot but missed badly. The rebound came directly to a Florida player which would give Florida a chance to tie the game, but they were unable to secure the rebound and knocked the ball into the hands of Tiana-Jo Carter, who made a layup to increase the lead to four with seven seconds left in the game. Albany let Florida drive the length of the court to score the first basket since the 8:05 mark, but it was not enough and Albany won the game 61–59. In an odd statistical note, the official final score of the game is 61–59, but a scorer error was discovered after the game when a missed free-throw was counted as a make for Florida. The total points scored for Florida was officially recorded as 58. Because the error was not discovered during the game the final score will not be changed.
- Kansas State hasn't won a tournament game in four years. They faced George Washington and their opening game. The score was tied at the end of the first quarter but the Colonials outscored the Wildcats 17–8 in the second quarter to take a nine-point lead at the half. Kansas State responded in the second half, scoring the first nine points of the half and adding a 14–5 run later in the quarter to take the lead. George Washington kept the game close and were within a single point with just over 20 seconds left in the game. Kansas State hit four of the six free throws in the final seconds to earn their first victory in four years, defeating George Washington 56–51.
- Tennessee was playing Green Bay as a seven seed, their lowest ever seed in the tournament. The game was back and forth for most of the game, with the Volunteers holding a one-point lead at the end of the first quarter, while the Phoenix came back to tie the game at the half and take a one-point lead in the third quarter. Tennessee's Mercedes Russell scored eight points but had a team-high 13 rebounds. The game continued to be close until late in the fourth quarter when Tennessee took a one-point lead with just under six minutes to go and then went on a 10–0 run. The Phoenix were unable to come back in Tennessee ended the game with the win 59–53.

==== Second round ====
- Tiffany Mitchell was playing her last game before the home crowd at Colonial Life Arena and scored 20 points, 16 of them in the first two quarters and their game against Kansas State. Mitchell had to lead her team when teammate A'ja Wilson picked up two fouls and had to leave the court two minutes into the game. Mitchell led her team to a 73–47 win over the Wildcats. She came out of the game early in the fourth quarter when the Gamecocks were up by 30 points to a huge ovation from the crowd and hugs from her teammates. The Gamecocks are now 47–1 in the past three years on their home court.
- Syracuse opened up a four-point lead at the end of the first quarter over Albany and extended the lead over the great Danes to seven by halftime, but the Orange did not relax, knowing that Albany had overcome an 11-point deficit to Florida in the previous game. Syracuse outscored Albany by nine points in the third quarter. Albany's Shereesha Richards, who earned America East player of the year honors three times became the program's first Division I All-American as well as their career leading scorer ended up with 23 points, but it wasn't enough. Syracuse won the game 76–59.
- The West Virginia Mountaineers opened up a lead over Ohio State and led by six at the end of the first quarter. The Buckeyes responded in the second quarter outscoring the Mountaineers by six tying the game at halftime. Ohio State's Kelsey Mitchell was too much for West Virginia as she scored 45 points, representing the fourth most ever in NCAA tournament play. Although West Virginia shot 48% from the field, better than Ohio State's 37%, the Buckeyes finished with the win 88–81.
- Tennessee entered the tournament with the most losses in history and the lowest position, a seven seed, in the history of the tournament. Despite playing on Arizona State's home court, they hit 52% of their shots. Mercedes Russell scored 12 in the first half, and Diamond DeShields scored 24 points in the game. The Lady Vols went on to beat the Sun Devils 75–64.

==== Sweet Sixteen ====
- Despite 31 bench points and double-doubles from Alaina Coates and A'ja Wilson, South Carolina lost to Syracuse, 80–72, ending their historic season with an overall record of 33–2. Quentin Hillsman, the Syracuse coach sent a message to Brianna Butler who had only scored two points in the first half, and missed all of her three-point attempts. “You’ve got to hit some shots or were going home”. In the second half, she did hit shots including four of her six-point attempts. The Gamecocks entered the fourth quarter with a 56–50 lead, but were outscored by the Orange, 30–16, over the final 10 minutes of the game.
- Tennessee's Mercedes Russell scored a career-high 25 points and grabbed 15 rebounds in the Lady Vols' 78–62 victory over Ohio State. Tennessee led by as many as 22 points against a short-handed Ohio State team that stuck with a six-player rotation despite having two players with four fouls. The Buckeyes came in without Cait Craft, who broke her left hand in practice Tuesday, and with Ameryst Alston not 100 percent because of a sprained right wrist. Ohio State coach Kevin McGruff said the injuries were "no excuse. Tennessee was great tonight. That was the story. We were a little bit off and didn't play our best game. That had a lot to do with Tennessee. We've had tough injuries, but that's part of the game."

==== Elite 8 ====
- The all orange matchup between Tennessee and Syracuse featured one team who has been in 28 Elite Eights and one team that was vying for their first ever Final Four. The Lady Vols held a two-point lead at the end of the first quarter, but the Syracuse came back in the second quarter and held a six-point lead at the half. At the end of the third quarter Syracuse had extended the lead by one point, but in the fourth quarter Brianna Butler hit three consecutive three-pointers to build a large lead. Butler ended with 18 points. Alexis Peterson scored 29 points a season-high for her, and that performance coupled with the 26 points she scored against South Carolina earned her the most outstanding player of the regional. Syracuse beat Tennessee 89–67.

==== Bracket ====
First round Round of 64; March 18
1	South Carolina	77
16	Jacksonville	41
Columbia, SC
8	George Washington	51
9	Kansas State	56
5	Florida	59
12	Albany	61
Syracuse, NY
4	Syracuse	73
13	Army	56
6	West Virginia	74
11	Princeton	65
Columbus, OH
3	Ohio State	88
14	Buffalo	69
7	Tennessee	59
10	Green Bay	53
Tempe, AZ
2	Arizona State	74
15	New Mexico State	52

Second Round; Round of 32; March 20
1	South Carolina	73
9	Kansas State	47
12	Albany	59
4	Syracuse	76
6	West Virginia	81
3	Ohio State	88
7	Tennessee	75
2	Arizona State	64

Regional semifinals Sweet 16; March 25
1	South Carolina	72
4	Syracuse	80
3	Ohio State	62
7	Tennessee	78

Regional Final; Elite 8 March 27
4	Syracuse	89
7	Tennessee	67

==== Sioux Falls Regional Final ====
ESPN

March 27
3:30 PM EDT

Summary

Syracuse 89, Tennessee 67
Scoring by quarter: 20–22, 21–13, 22–21, 26–11
Pts: A. Peterson 29; Rebs: A. Day 8 Asts: A. Peterson 6	Pts: D. DeShields 20; Rebs: D. DeShields 10; Asts: J. Nared 6

Denny Sanford Premier Center, Sioux Falls, SD
Attendance: 4,055
Referees: Beverly Roberts, Dee Kantner, Felicia Grinter

==== Sioux Falls Regional all tournament team ====
- Alexis Peterson (Syracuse) (Most Outstanding Player)
- Brianna Butler (Syracuse)
- Cornelia Fondre (Syracuse)
- Diamond DeShields (Tennessee)
- Mercedes Russell (Tennessee)
- Alaina Coates (South Carolina)

== Final Four ==
During the Final Four round, regardless of the seeds of the participating teams, the champion of the top overall top seed's region plays the champion of the fourth-ranked top seed's region, and the champion of the second overall top seed's region plays the champion of the third-ranked top seed's region.

=== Bankers Life Fieldhouse - Indianapolis, IN ===
National semifinals April 3
BR1	UConn	80
DAL2	Oregon State	51
SF4	Syracuse	80
LEX7	Washington	59

National Championship Game; April 5
BR1	UConn	82
SF4	Syracuse	51

==== National semifinals ====
ESPN

April 3
6:00 PM EDT

Summary

#2 Oregon State 51, #1 Connecticut 80
Scoring by quarter: 17–26, 9–21, 15–17, 10–16
Pts: S. Wiese 13; Rebs: R. Hamblin 11; Asts: S. Siegner 3	Pts: M. Tuck 21; Rebs: B. Stewart 8 Asts: M. Jefferson 7

Bankers Life Fieldhouse - Indianapolis, IN
Attendance: 15,227
Referees: Brenda Pantoja(Referee) Joe Vaszily(U1) Felicia Grinter (U2), -Robert "Bob" Scofield (standby official)

ESPN2

April 3
8:30 PM EDT

Summary

#7 Washington 59, #4 Syracuse 80
Scoring by quarter: 12–23, 19–20, 17–24, 11–13
Pts: T. Walton 29; Rebs: C. Osahor 14; Asts: C. Osahor 6	Pts: A. Peterson 18; Rebs: B. Day 15; Asts: A. Peterson 6

Bankers Life Fieldhouse - Indianapolis, IN
Attendance: 15,227
Referees: Lisa Mattingly (Ref)

, Denise Brooks (U1) Kyle Bacon (U2)

Robert "Bob" Scofield (standby official)

==== National Championship ====
ESPN

April 5
8:30 PM EDT

Box score

#4 Syracuse 51, #1 Connecticut 82
Scoring by quarter: 13–28, 10–22, 20–14, 8–18
Pts: C. Fondren 16; Rebs: B. Day 5 Asts: B. Sykes 2	Pts: B. Stewart 24; Rebs: B. Stewart 10; Asts: B. Stewart 6

Bankers Life Fieldhouse - Indianapolis, IN
Attendance: 14,514
Referees: Dee Kantner (Ref)

Lisa Jones(U1) Beverly Roberts (U2)

Robert "Bob" Scofield (standby official)

==== Final Four all-tournament team ====
- Breanna Stewart (Connecticut) (Most Outstanding Player)
- Talia Walton (Washington)
- Morgan Tuck (Connecticut)
- Brianna Butler (Syracuse)
- Alexis Peterson (Syracuse)

== Record by conference ==
Conference	Bids	Record	Win %	R64	R32	S16	E8	F4	CG	NC
American	2	8–1	0.889	2	2	1	1	1	1	1
Pac-12	5	14–5	0.737	5	5	4	3	2	–	–
ACC	5	10–5	0.667	5	4	3	1	1	1	–
Big 12	6	9–6	0.600	6	5	2	2	–	–	–
SEC	9	12–9	0.571	9	7	4	1	–	–	–
America East	1	1–1	0.500	1	1	–	–	–	–	–
Big Ten	5	5–5	0.500	5	4	1	–	–	–	–
Summit	1	1–1	0.500	1	1	–	–	–	–	–
Atlantic 10	3	2–3	0.400	3	2	–	–	–	–	–
Big East	3	2–3	0.400	3	1	1	–	–	–	–
Ivy League	2	0–2	0.000	2	–	–	–	–	–	–
West Coast	2	0–2	0.000	2	–	–	–	–	–	–

- The R64, R32, S16, E8, F4, CG, and NC columns indicate how many teams from each conference were in the round of 64 (first round), round of 32 (second round), Sweet 16, Elite Eight, Final Four, championship game, and national champion, respectively.
- The Atlantic Sun, Big Sky, Big South, Big West, Colonial (CAA), Conference USA, Horizon, MEAC, Metro Atlantic, Mid-American (MAC), Missouri Valley, Mountain West, Northeast, Ohio Valley, Patriot, Southern, Southland, Sun Belt, SWAC, and WAC conferences each had one representative that was eliminated in the first round.

== Media coverage ==
=== Television ===
ESPN had US television rights to all games during the tournament. For the first and second round, ESPN aired select games nationally on ESPN, ESPNU, or ESPNews. All other games aired regionally on ESPN, ESPN2, or ESPN3 and were streamed online via WatchESPN. Most of the nation got whip-a-round coverage during this time, which allowed ESPN to rotate between the games and focus the nation on the game that has the closest score. The regional semifinals and national semifinals were split between ESPN and ESPN2. ESPN aired the regional finals and the national championship game.

==== Studio host & analysts ====
- Kevin Negandhi (Host)
- Kara Lawson (Analyst)
- Rebecca Lobo (Analyst)

==== Broadcast Assignments ====
First & Second Rounds Friday/Sunday

- Melissa Lee and LaChina Robinson – Starkville, Mississippi
- Bob Wischusen and Steffi Sorensen – Syracuse, New York
- Brenda VanLengen and Katie Smith – Columbus, Ohio
- Marc Kestecher and Andy Landers – Louisville, Kentucky
- Pam Ward and Carolyn Peck – Waco, Texas
- Clay Matvick and Sue Bird – Corvallis, Oregon
- Mark Jones and Gail Goestenkors – Tempe, Arizona
- Beth Mowins and Stephanie White – Columbia, South Carolina

Sweet Sixteen & Elite Eight Friday/Sunday

- Dave Pasch, Debbie Antonelli, and Allison Williams – Lexington, Kentucky
- Beth Mowins, Stephanie White, and Maria Taylor – Sioux Falls, South Dakota

Final Four

- Beth Mowins, Doris Burke, and Holly Rowe – Indianapolis, IN

First & Second Rounds Saturday/Monday

- Dave O'Brien and Doris Burke – Storrs, Connecticut
- Roy Philpott and Brooke Weisbrod – College Park, Maryland
- Paul Sunderland and Chiney Ogwumike – College Station, Texas
- Cara Capuano and Carol Ross – Lexington, Kentucky
- Dave Pasch and Debbie Antonelli – South Bend, Indiana
- Tiffany Greene and Candace Parker – Los Angeles, California
- Bob Picozzi and Mary Murphy – Stanford, California
- Lowell Galindo and Nell Fortner – Austin, Texas

Sweet Sixteen & Elite Eight Saturday/Monday

- Dave O'Brien, Doris Burke, and Holly Rowe – Bridgeport, Connecticut
- Pam Ward, Carolyn Peck, and Steffi Sorensen – Dallas, Texas

Championship

- Beth Mowins, Doris Burke, and Holly Rowe – Indianapolis, IN

=== Radio ===
Westwood One has exclusive radio rights to the entire tournament. Teams participating in the Regional Finals, Final Four, and championship are allowed to have their own local broadcasts, but they aren't allowed to stream those broadcasts online.

Regional Finals Sunday

- Kevin Lee and Krista Blunk – Lexington, Kentucky
- Dick Fain and Brenda VanLengen – Sioux Falls, South Dakota

Final Four

- John Sadak, Debbie Antonelli, and Krista Blunk – Indianapolis, Indiana

Regional Finals Monday

- John Sadak and Krista Blunk – Bridgeport, Connecticut
- Ted Emrich and Debbie Antonelli – Dallas, Texas

Championship

- John Sadak, Debbie Antonelli, and Krista Blunk – Indianapolis, Indiana

== See also ==
- 2016 NCAA Division I men's basketball tournament
- 2016 NCAA Division II women's basketball tournament
- 2016 NCAA Division II men's basketball tournament
- 2016 Women's National Invitation Tournament
- 2016 Women's Basketball Invitational
- 2015–16 NCAA Division I women's basketball rankings
