= 2015–16 NCAA Division I women's basketball season =

American women's college basketball season

- Preseason AP No. 1: Connecticut
- Regular season: November 2015 – April 5, 2016
- NCAA Tournament: 2016
- Tournament dates: March 18 – April 5, 2016
- National Championship: Bankers Life Fieldhouse; Indianapolis, Indiana
- NCAA Champions: Connecticut
- Other champions: South Dakota (WNIT); Louisiana–Lafayette (WBI)
- Player of the Year (Naismith, Wooden): Breanna Stewart (Connecticut)

The 2015–16 NCAA Division I women's basketball season began in November and ended with the Final Four in Indianapolis, April 3–5. Practices officially began on October 3.

This season of NCAA women's basketball games was the first to be played in 10-minute quarters, the standard for FIBA and WNBA play.

== Other NCAA changes ==
In addition to the change to quarter play, the NCAA also affords each team three 30-second timeouts and one 60-second timeout per game, and a media timeout will occur at the first dead ball after the 5:00 mark of each quarter. If a timeout is called before the 5:00 mark, that timeout replaces the media timeout. Teams will also be allowed to advance the ball to the front court following a timeout after a made basket, a rebound or change in possession in the last minute of the fourth quarter or any overtime periods.

The bonus situation has also changed, with teams reaching the bonus on the fifth foul of each quarter, where they will be awarded two free throws. Previously, teams shot one-and-one on the seventh foul of the half and reached the two-shot double bonus on the 10th foul. Fouls will reset following each quarter, with all overtime periods counting as extensions of the fourth quarter.

== Team changes ==
- The Omaha Mavericks began their NCAA Division I and Summit League postseason eligibility this season in a new on-campus venue, Baxter Arena. The first game was a 61–56 exhibition loss to Division II Washburn on November 4; the first regular-season game was a 75–60 win over UCF on November 14.
- On January 10, the Ole Miss Rebels made their debut in the new Pavilion at Ole Miss against Florida, losing 85–65.

== Pre-season polls ==
The top 25 from the AP and USA Today Coaches Polls.

Associated Press
Ranking	Team
1	Connecticut (32)
2	South Carolina
3	Notre Dame
4	Tennessee
5	Baylor
6	Ohio State
7	Florida State
8	Louisville
9	Maryland
10	Oregon State
11	Mississippi State
12	Texas
13	Texas A&M
14	Duke
15	Arizona State
16	Stanford
17	Oklahoma
18	Kentucky
19	Northwestern
20	South Florida
21	George Washington
22	North Carolina
23	Syracuse
24	Michigan State
25	Chattanooga

USA Today Coaches
Ranking	Team
1	Connecticut (32)
2	South Carolina
3	Notre Dame
4	Tennessee
5	Baylor
6	Maryland
7	Florida State
8	Louisville
9	Oregon State
10	Ohio State
11	Texas
12	Duke
13	Mississippi State
14	Stanford
15	Arizona State
16	Texas A&M
17	Kentucky
18	Oklahoma
19	South Florida
20	North Carolina
21	George Washington
22	DePaul
23	Iowa
24	Northwestern
25	Princeton

== Postseason ==
=== Conference winners and tournaments ===
Thirty-one athletic conferences each ended their regular seasons with a single-elimination tournament. The team with the best regular-season record in each conference was given the number one seed in each tournament, with tiebreakers used as needed in the case of ties for the top seeding. All conferences also recognize regular-season champions, with co-championships being awarded in the case of ties. The winners of these tournaments receive automatic invitations to the 2016 NCAA Women's Division I Basketball Tournament. For the final time, the Ivy League did not hold a conference tournament, instead giving its automatic invitation to its regular season champion; in case of a tie for the regular-season title (which did not happen this season), the automatic berth would have been decided by a one-game playoff (or series of one-game playoffs if more than two teams were tied).

Conference	Regular season winner	Conference player of the year	Conference Coach of the Year	Conference tournament	Tournament venue (city)	Tournament winner
America East	Albany (Note: Won tiebreaker for top tournament seed.); Maine	Shereesha Richards, Albany	Linda Cimino, Binghamton	2016 America East women's basketball tournament	Quarterfinals and semifinals: Binghamton University Events Center (Vestal, New York); Final at top remaining seed	Albany
American	Connecticut	Breanna Stewart, Connecticut	Geno Auriemma, Connecticut	2016 American Athletic Conference women's basketball tournament	Mohegan Sun Arena (Uncasville, Connecticut)	Connecticut
Atlantic 10	Duquesne; George Washington; Saint Louis	Jackie Kemph, Saint Louis; April Robinson, Duquesne	Lisa Stone, Saint Louis	2016 Atlantic 10 women's basketball tournament	Richmond Coliseum (Richmond, Virginia)	George Washington
Atlantic Coast	Notre Dame	Myisha Hines-Allen, Louisville (media); Brianna Turner, Notre Dame (coaches)	Muffet McGraw, Notre Dame	2016 ACC women's basketball tournament	Greensboro Coliseum (Greensboro, North Carolina)	Notre Dame
Atlantic Sun	Florida Gulf Coast	Whitney Knight, Florida Gulf Coast	Karl Smesko, Florida Gulf Coast	2016 ASUN women's basketball tournament	Campus sites	Jacksonville
Big 12	Baylor	Brittney Martin, Oklahoma State	Jim Littell, Oklahoma State	2016 Big 12 Conference women's basketball tournament	Chesapeake Energy Arena (Oklahoma City)	Baylor
Big East	DePaul	Chanise Jenkins, DePaul	Doug Bruno, DePaul	2016 Big East women's basketball tournament	McGrath–Phillips Arena (Chicago)	St. John's
Big Sky	Montana State	Jasmine Hommes, Montana State	Tricia Binford, Montana State	2016 Big Sky Conference women's basketball tournament	Reno Events Center (Reno, Nevada)	Idaho
Big South	UNC Asheville	Chatori Major, UNC Asheville	Brenda Mock Kirkpatrick, UNC Asheville	2016 Big South Conference women's basketball tournament	Kimmel Arena (Asheville, North Carolina)	UNC Asheville
Big Ten	Maryland	Rachel Banham, Minnesota	Teri Moren, Indiana	2016 Big Ten Conference women's basketball tournament	Bankers Life Fieldhouse (Indianapolis)	Maryland
Big West	UC Riverside	Brittany Crain, UC Riverside	John Margaritis, UC Riverside	2016 Big West Conference women's basketball tournament	First round and quarterfinals: Bren Events Center (Irvine, California); Semifinals and final: Honda Center (Anaheim, California)	Hawaii
Colonial	James Madison	Jazmon Gwathmey, James Madison	Kenny Brooks, James Madison	2016 CAA women's basketball tournament	The Show Place Arena (Upper Marlboro, Maryland)	James Madison
CUSA	UTEP	Kendall Noble, Western Kentucky	Keitha Adams, UTEP	2016 Conference USA women's basketball tournament	First two rounds and quarterfinals: Bartow Arena (Birmingham, Alabama); Semifinals and final: Legacy Arena (Birmingham, Alabama)	Middle Tennessee
Horizon	Green Bay	Kim Demmings, Wright State	Kyle Rechlicz, Milwaukee	2016 Horizon League women's basketball tournament	Kress Events Center (Green Bay, Wisconsin)	Green Bay
Ivy	Penn	Sydney Stipanovich, Penn	Mike McLaughlin, Penn	No tournament		
Metro Atlantic	Quinnipiac	Tori Jarosz, Marist	Tricia Fabbri, Quinnipiac	2016 MAAC women's basketball tournament	Times Union Center (Albany, New York)	Iona
Mid-American	Ohio (East and overall #1); Central Michigan (West)	Nathalie Fontaine, Ball State	Sue Guevara, Central Michigan	2016 Mid-American Conference women's basketball tournament	First round at campus sites Remainder at Quicken Loans Arena, (Cleveland, Ohio)	Buffalo
Mid-Eastern	Bethune–Cookman; North Carolina A&T	Malia Tate-DeFreitas, Hampton	Vanessa Blair-Lewis, Bethune-Cookman	2016 MEAC women's basketball tournament	Norfolk Scope (Norfolk, Virginia)	North Carolina A&T
Missouri Valley	Northern Iowa	Tyonna Snow, Missouri State	Tanya Warren, Northern Iowa	2016 Missouri Valley Conference women's basketball tournament	iWireless Center (Moline, Illinois)	Missouri State
Mountain West	Colorado State	Ellen Nystrom, Colorado State	Ryun Williams, Colorado State	2016 Mountain West Conference women's basketball tournament	Thomas & Mack Center (Paradise, Nevada)	Colorado State
Northeast	Sacred Heart	Hannah Kimmel, Sacred Heart	Jessica Mannetti, Sacred Heart	2016 Northeast Conference women's basketball tournament	Campus sites	Robert Morris
Ohio Valley	UT Martin	Shronda Butts, SIU Edwardsville	Kevin McMillan, UT Martin	2016 Ohio Valley Conference women's basketball tournament	Nashville Municipal Auditorium (Nashville, Tennessee)	Belmont
Pac-12	Arizona State; Oregon State	Jamie Weisner, Oregon State (coaches & media); Jillian Alleyne, Oregon (media)	Charli Turner Thorne, Arizona State	2016 Pac-12 Conference women's basketball tournament	KeyArena (Seattle)	Oregon State
Patriot	Army; Bucknell	Kelsey Minato, Army	Aaron Roussell, Bucknell	2016 Patriot League women's basketball tournament	Campus sites	Army
Southeastern	South Carolina	A'ja Wilson, South Carolina	Dawn Staley, South Carolina	2016 SEC women's basketball tournament	Jacksonville Veterans Memorial Arena (Jacksonville, Florida)	South Carolina
Southern	Chattanooga; Mercer	Kahlia Lawrence, Mercer	Susie Gardner, Mercer	2016 Southern Conference women's basketball tournament	U.S. Cellular Center (Asheville, North Carolina)	Chattanooga
Southland	Abilene Christian (Note: Under Southland Conference bylaws, transitional Division I member Abilene Christian was ineligible for the conference tournament. The top tournament seed went to second-place Central Arkansas.)	Alexis Mason, Abilene Christian	Julie Goodenough, Abilene Christian	2016 Southland Conference women's basketball tournament	Leonard E. Merrell Center (Katy, Texas)	Central Arkansas
Southwestern	Alabama State; Southern; Texas Southern	Norianna Haynes, Alcorn State	Nadine Domond, Grambling State	2016 SWAC women's basketball tournament	Toyota Center (Houston, Texas)	Alabama State
Summit	South Dakota	Nicole Seekamp, South Dakota	Amy Williams, South Dakota	2016 Summit League women's basketball tournament	Denny Sanford Premier Center (Sioux Falls, South Dakota)	South Dakota State
Sun Belt	Arkansas State	Aundrea Gamble, Arkansas State	Bryan Boyer, Arkansas State	2016 Sun Belt Conference women's basketball tournament	Lakefront Arena (New Orleans)	Troy
West Coast	BYU	Lexi Rydalch, BYU	Jeff Judkins, BYU	2016 West Coast Conference women's basketball tournament	Orleans Arena (Paradise, Nevada)	San Francisco
Western	New Mexico State	Shawnte' Goff, UTRGV	Mark Trakh, New Mexico State	2016 WAC women's basketball tournament	Orléans Arena (Paradise, Nevada)	New Mexico State

=== Statistical leaders ===
Points per game			Rebounds per game			Assists per game			Steals per game		
Player	School	PPG	Player	School	RPG	Player	School	APG	Player	School	SPG
Jasmine Nwajei	Wagner	29	Anna Stickland	Houston Baptist	14.2	Niya Johnson	Baylor	8.7	Ashley Deary	Northwestern	4.03
Rachel Banham	Minnesota	28.6	Jillian Alleyne	Oregon	13.6	Rachel Theriot	Nebraska	7.3	Chastadie Barrs	Lamar	3.97
Kelsey Mitchell	Ohio State	26.1	Lexi Martins	Lehigh	13.6	Jackie Kemph	St. Louis	7	Adella Randle-El	Sacramento State	3.77
Kelsey Plum	Washington	25.9	Ruvanna Campbell	Ill-Chicago	13.5	Caitlin Ingle	Drake	6.939	Aliyah Kilpatrick	Winthrop	3.59
Lexi Rydalch	BYU	24.2	Kalani Purcell	BYU	12.6	Roddricka Patton	Oklahoma State	6.935	Amani Tatum	Manhattan	3.26

Blocked shots per game			Field goal percentage			Three-point field goal percentage			Free throw percentage		
Player	School	BPG	Player	School	FG%	Player	School	3FG%	Player	School	FT%
Bego Faz Davalos	Fresno State	4	Brionna Jones	Maryland	66.5	Shatori Walker-Kimbrough	Maryland	54.5	Kim Albrecht	Binghamton	91.4
Jasmine Joyner	Chattanooga	3.94	Hallie Thome	Michigan	63.1	Kelsey Minato	Army	47.8	Cartaesha Macklin	Southern Illinois	90.5
Jodie Cornelie-Sigmundova	Dayton	3.55	Sara Rhine	Drake	62.9	Karlie Samuelson	Stanford	47.3	Janelle Perez	Northwestern State	90.2
Ruth Hamblin	Oregon State	3.51	Sarah Cash	Youngstown State	60	Jacquie Klotz	Bucknall	47.3	Daniele Ewert	Alabama State	90.1
Josie Stockill	Colgate	3.5	Brianna Turner	Notre Dame	59.3	Madison Cable	Notre Dame	46	Kelsey Plum	Washington	88.96

=== NCAA tournament ===
==== Tournament upsets ====
For this list, a "major upset" is defined as a win by a team seeded 7 or more spots below its defeated opponent.

Date	Winner	Score	Loser	Region	Round
March 18	Albany (12)	61-59	Florida (5)	Sioux Falls	Round of 64
March 19	South Dakota State (12)	74-71	Miami (FL) (5)	Lexington	Round of 64

== Conference standings ==
2015–16 American Athletic Conference women's basketball standings
	Conf.				Overall
Team	W		L	PCT	W		L	PCT
No. 1 UConn †	18	–	0	1.000	38	–	0	1.000
No. 21 South Florida	14	–	4	.778	24	–	10	.706
Temple	13	–	5	.722	23	–	12	.657
Memphis	12	–	6	.667	18	–	13	.581
Tulane	11	–	7	.611	23	–	12	.657
Tulsa	8	–	10	.444	12	–	19	.387
SMU	7	–	11	.389	13	–	18	.419
East Carolina	6	–	12	.333	13	–	19	.406
Cincinnati	4	–	14	.222	8	–	22	.267
UCF	4	–	14	.222	7	–	23	.233
Houston	2	–	16	.111	6	–	24	.200
† American Tournament winner As of April 5, 2016; Rankings from AP poll

2015–16 America East Conference women's basketball standings
	Conf.				Overall
Team	W		L	PCT	W		L	PCT
Albany †	15	–	1	.938	28	–	5	.848
Maine	15	–	1	.938	26	–	9	.743
UMBC	8	–	8	.500	18	–	14	.563
Stony Brook	8	–	8	.500	17	–	15	.531
Binghamton	8	–	8	.500	14	–	17	.452
Hartford	7	–	9	.438	11	–	19	.367
New Hampshire	6	–	10	.375	12	–	18	.400
Vermont	4	–	12	.250	9	–	21	.300
UMass Lowell*	1	–	15	.063	4	–	24	.143
† 2016 America East tournament winner As of March 20, 2016 *ineligible for postseason play due to Div. I transitions Rankings from AP poll

2015–16 Atlantic 10 women's basketball standings
	Conf.				Overall
Team	W		L	PCT	W		L	PCT
Duquesne	13	–	3	.813	28	–	6	.824
George Washington †	13	–	3	.813	26	–	7	.788
Saint Louis	13	–	3	.813	26	–	8	.765
St. Bonaventure	12	–	4	.750	24	–	8	.750
VCU	10	–	6	.625	23	–	10	.697
Saint Joseph's	8	–	8	.500	14	–	15	.483
Fordham	8	–	8	.500	14	–	17	.452
Dayton	7	–	9	.438	14	–	15	.483
George Mason	6	–	10	.375	12	–	19	.387
Richmond	5	–	11	.313	13	–	18	.419
Rhode Island	5	–	11	.313	12	–	18	.400
UMass	5	–	11	.313	12	–	18	.400
Davidson	5	–	11	.313	11	–	19	.367
La Salle	2	–	14	.125	5	–	25	.167
† 2016 A10 Tournament winner As of March 25, 2016; Rankings from AP poll

2015–16 Atlantic Sun women's basketball standings
	Conf.				Overall
Team	W		L	PCT	W		L	PCT
Florida Gulf Coast	14	–	0	1.000	33	–	5	.868
Jacksonville †	11	–	3	.786	22	–	11	.667
USC Upstate	10	–	4	.714	22	–	12	.647
Stetson	9	–	5	.643	20	–	12	.625
Kennesaw State	6	–	8	.429	11	–	19	.367
North Florida	3	–	11	.214	7	–	23	.233
Lipscomb	2	–	12	.143	5	–	25	.167
NJIT	1	–	13	.071	4	–	26	.133
† 2016 Atlantic Sun tournament winner As of April 2, 2016; Rankings from AP poll

2015–16 ACC women's basketball standings
	Conf.				Overall
Team	W		L	PCT	W		L	PCT
No. 2 Notre Dame †	16	–	0	1.000	33	–	2	.943
No. 8 Louisville	15	–	1	.938	26	–	8	.765
No. 14 Syracuse	13	–	3	.813	30	–	8	.789
No. 17 Florida State	13	–	3	.813	25	–	8	.758
No. 19 Miami (FL)	10	–	6	.625	24	–	9	.727
NC State	10	–	6	.625	20	–	11	.645
Duke	8	–	8	.500	20	–	12	.625
Georgia Tech	8	–	8	.500	20	–	13	.606
Virginia	6	–	10	.375	18	–	16	.529
Wake Forest	6	–	10	.375	17	–	16	.515
Virginia Tech	5	–	11	.313	18	–	14	.563
North Carolina	4	–	12	.250	14	–	18	.438
Pittsburgh	4	–	12	.250	13	–	18	.419
Boston College	2	–	14	.125	15	–	16	.484
Clemson	0	–	16	.000	4	–	26	.133
† 2016 ACC tournament winner As of April 5, 2016; Rankings from AP poll

2015–16 Big East Conference women's basketball standings
	Conf.				Overall
Team	W		L	PCT	W		L	PCT
No. 20 DePaul*	16	–	2	.889	27	–	9	.750
Seton Hall	12	–	6	.667	23	–	9	.719
Villanova	12	–	6	.667	20	–	12	.625
St. John's †	11	–	7	.611	23	–	10	.697
Georgetown	9	–	9	.500	16	–	14	.533
Marquette	9	–	9	.500	14	–	16	.467
Xavier	8	–	10	.444	17	–	13	.567
Creighton	8	–	10	.444	17	–	18	.486
Butler	4	–	14	.222	10	–	21	.323
Providence	1	–	17	.056	5	–	24	.172
† 2016 Big East Basketball Tournament winner * Tournament #1 seed As of March 26, 2016; Rankings from AP poll

2015–16 Big Sky women's basketball standings
	Conf.				Overall
Team	W		L	PCT	W		L	PCT
Montana State	14	–	4	.778	21	–	10	.677
Idaho †	13	–	5	.722	24	–	10	.706
Eastern Washington	13	–	5	.722	20	–	12	.625
North Dakota	13	–	5	.722	19	–	14	.576
Montana	12	–	6	.667	20	–	11	.645
Weber State	11	–	7	.611	23	–	12	.657
Sacramento State	10	–	8	.556	14	–	17	.452
Idaho State	8	–	10	.444	18	–	15	.545
Northern Colorado	8	–	10	.444	13	–	16	.448
Northern Arizona	2	–	16	.111	6	–	24	.200
Southern Utah	2	–	16	.111	5	–	25	.167
Portland State	2	–	16	.111	4	–	26	.133
† 2016 Big Sky tournament winner As of March 26, 2016; Rankings from AP poll

2015–16 Big South women's basketball standings
	Conf.				Overall
Team	W		L	PCT	W		L	PCT
UNC Asheville †	16	–	4	.800	26	–	7	.788
Liberty	15	–	5	.750	20	–	13	.606
Gardner-Webb	13	–	7	.650	19	–	12	.613
Presbyterian	13	–	7	.650	18	–	13	.581
Radford	13	–	7	.650	18	–	13	.581
High Point	10	–	10	.500	12	–	19	.387
Charleston Southern	8	–	12	.400	14	–	17	.452
Campbell	7	–	13	.350	13	–	18	.419
Coastal Carolina	7	–	13	.350	12	–	18	.400
Longwood	5	–	15	.250	8	–	22	.267
Winthrop	3	–	17	.150	4	–	26	.133
† 2016 Big South tournament winner As of March 19, 2016; Rankings from AP poll

2015–16 Big Ten women's basketball standings
	Conf.				Overall
Team	W		L	PCT	W		L	PCT
No. 5 Maryland†	16	–	2	.889	31	–	4	.886
No. 9 Ohio State	15	–	3	.833	26	–	8	.765
No. 16 Michigan State	13	–	5	.722	25	–	9	.735
Indiana	12	–	6	.667	21	–	12	.636
Minnesota	11	–	7	.611	20	–	12	.625
Purdue	10	–	8	.556	20	–	12	.625
Michigan	9	–	9	.500	21	–	14	.600
Nebraska	9	–	9	.500	18	–	13	.581
Iowa	8	–	10	.444	19	–	14	.576
Rutgers	8	–	10	.444	19	–	15	.559
Penn State	6	–	12	.333	12	–	19	.387
Northwestern	4	–	14	.222	18	–	17	.514
Wisconsin	3	–	15	.167	7	–	22	.241
Illinois	2	–	16	.111	9	–	21	.300
† 2016 Big Ten tournament winner As of March 31, 2016; Rankings from AP poll

2015–16 Big West women's basketball standings
	Conf.				Overall
Team	W		L	PCT	W		L	PCT
UC Riverside	16	–	0	1.000	23	–	9	.719
Long Beach State	12	–	4	.750	24	–	9	.727
Hawaii †	12	–	4	.750	21	–	11	.656
UC Davis	10	–	6	.625	19	–	12	.613
UC Santa Barbara	8	–	8	.500	12	–	20	.375
Cal Poly	7	–	9	.438	15	–	16	.484
Cal State Northridge	5	–	11	.313	7	–	24	.226
UC Irvine	1	–	15	.063	4	–	27	.129
Cal State Fullerton	1	–	15	.063	3	–	27	.100
† 2016 Big West tournament winner As of March 19, 2016; Rankings from AP poll

2015–16 Big 12 Conference women's basketball standings
	Conf.				Overall
Team	W		L	PCT	W		L	PCT
No. 4 Baylor †	17	–	1	.944	36	–	2	.947
No. 6 Texas	15	–	3	.833	31	–	5	.861
No. 22 West Virginia	12	–	6	.667	25	–	10	.714
Oklahoma State	11	–	7	.611	21	–	10	.677
No. 24 Oklahoma	11	–	7	.611	22	–	11	.667
Kansas State	8	–	10	.444	19	–	13	.594
TCU	8	–	10	.444	18	–	15	.545
Iowa State	5	–	13	.278	13	–	17	.433
Texas Tech	3	–	15	.167	13	–	18	.419
Kansas	0	–	18	.000	6	–	25	.194
† 2016 Big 12 Tournament winner Rankings from AP poll

2015–16 CAA women's basketball standings
	Conf.				Overall
Team	W		L	PCT	W		L	PCT
James Madison †	17	–	1	.944	27	–	6	.818
Hofstra	13	–	5	.722	25	–	9	.735
Drexel	13	–	5	.722	19	–	14	.576
Elon	11	–	7	.611	18	–	13	.581
Delaware	10	–	8	.556	16	–	15	.516
Northeastern	9	–	9	.500	15	–	16	.484
William & Mary	6	–	12	.333	15	–	15	.500
College of Charleston	5	–	13	.278	11	–	20	.355
UNC Wilmington	3	–	15	.167	7	–	23	.233
Towson	3	–	15	.167	7	–	24	.226
† 2016 CAA tournament winner As of March 28, 2016; Rankings from AP poll

2015–16 Conference USA women's basketball standings
	Conf.				Overall
Team	W		L	PCT	W		L	PCT
UTEP	16	–	2	.889	29	–	5	.853
WKU	15	–	3	.833	27	–	7	.794
Middle Tennessee †	15	–	3	.833	24	–	9	.727
Charlotte	12	–	6	.667	19	–	12	.613
Old Dominion	10	–	8	.556	17	–	17	.500
Marshall	9	–	9	.500	21	–	12	.636
Louisiana Tech	9	–	9	.500	14	–	16	.467
UAB	7	–	11	.389	15	–	16	.484
Southern Miss	7	–	11	.389	14	–	16	.467
Rice	7	–	11	.389	9	–	22	.290
Florida Atlantic	6	–	12	.333	14	–	16	.467
UTSA	6	–	12	.333	10	–	19	.345
North Texas	5	–	13	.278	11	–	19	.367
FIU	2	–	16	.111	5	–	26	.161
† 2016 C-USA Tournament winner As of March 28, 2016; Rankings from AP poll

2015–16 Horizon League women's basketball standings
	Conf.				Overall
Team	W		L	PCT	W		L	PCT
Green Bay †	16	–	2	.889	28	–	5	.848
Wright State	12	–	6	.667	24	–	11	.686
Milwaukee	12	–	6	.667	19	–	13	.594
Detroit	11	–	7	.611	15	–	15	.500
Youngstown State	9	–	9	.500	21	–	13	.618
Northern Kentucky*	9	–	9	.500	19	–	14	.576
Oakland	7	–	11	.389	15	–	15	.500
Cleveland State	6	–	12	.333	9	–	20	.310
Valparaiso	5	–	13	.278	10	–	21	.323
Illinois-Chicago	3	–	15	.167	12	–	18	.400
† 2016 Horizon League Tournament winner * Ineligible for NCAA postseason during transition to Division I. As of March 23, 2016; Rankings from AP poll

2015–16 Ivy League women's basketball standings
	Conf.				Overall
Team	W		L	PCT	W		L	PCT
Penn†	13	–	1	.929	24	–	5	.828
Princeton	12	–	2	.857	23	–	6	.793
Harvard	9	–	5	.643	14	–	14	.500
Dartmouth	7	–	7	.500	12	–	18	.400
Cornell	6	–	8	.429	14	–	14	.500
Yale	5	–	9	.357	14	–	17	.452
Brown	3	–	11	.214	15	–	13	.536
Columbia	1	–	13	.071	12	–	17	.414
† Ivy League winner As of March 19, 2016; Rankings from AP Poll

2015–16 Mid-American Conference women's basketball standings
	Conf.				Overall
Team	W		L	PCT	W		L	PCT
East
Ohio	16	–	2	.889	26	–	7	.788
Akron	11	–	7	.611	19	–	14	.576
Buffalo †	8	–	10	.444	20	–	14	.588
Bowling Green	6	–	12	.333	10	–	18	.357
Miami (OH)	3	–	15	.167	9	–	21	.300
Kent State	3	–	15	.167	6	–	23	.207
West
Central Michigan	14	–	4	.778	22	–	11	.667
Ball State	13	–	5	.722	22	–	10	.688
Toledo	12	–	6	.667	17	–	13	.567
Eastern Michigan	10	–	8	.556	22	–	12	.647
Western Michigan	8	–	10	.444	17	–	15	.531
Northern Illinois	4	–	14	.222	11	–	19	.367
† 2016 MAC tournament winner As of March 24, 2016; Rankings from AP poll

2015–16 MAAC women's basketball standings
	Conf.				Overall
Team	W		L	PCT	W		L	PCT
Quinnipiac	17	–	3	.850	25	–	9	.735
Iona †	16	–	4	.800	23	–	12	.657
Marist	14	–	6	.700	16	–	16	.500
Fairfield	11	–	9	.550	16	–	14	.533
Manhattan	11	–	9	.550	14	–	16	.467
Monmouth	11	–	9	.550	14	–	17	.452
Siena	10	–	10	.500	14	–	18	.438
Canisius	8	–	12	.400	13	–	17	.433
Niagara	5	–	15	.250	8	–	22	.267
Rider	5	–	15	.250	8	–	22	.267
St. Peter's	2	–	18	.100	4	–	26	.133
† 2016 MAAC tournament winner As of March 20, 2016; Rankings from AP poll

2015–16 MEAC women's basketball standings
	Conf.				Overall
Team	W		L	PCT	W		L	PCT
North Carolina A&T †	12	–	4	.750	19	–	11	.633
Bethune-Cookman	12	–	4	.750	18	–	12	.600
Hampton	11	–	5	.688	14	–	17	.452
Coppin State	10	–	6	.625	16	–	16	.500
Morgan State	10	–	6	.625	13	–	17	.433
Maryland-Eastern Shore	10	–	6	.625	12	–	17	.414
Florida A&M	9	–	7	.563	16	–	15	.516
South Carolina State	7	–	9	.438	13	–	16	.448
Savannah State	7	–	9	.438	10	–	18	.357
Delaware State	6	–	10	.375	9	–	21	.300
Howard	4	–	12	.250	7	–	24	.226
North Carolina Central	3	–	13	.188	5	–	23	.179
Norfolk State	3	–	13	.188	3	–	24	.111
† 2016 MEAC tournament winner Rankings from AP poll

2015–16 Missouri Valley Conference women's basketball standings
	Conf.				Overall
Team	W		L	PCT	W		L	PCT
Northern Iowa	15	–	3	.833	24	–	11	.686
Missouri State †	14	–	4	.778	24	–	10	.706
Drake	14	–	4	.778	23	–	10	.697
Southern Illinois	12	–	6	.667	20	–	13	.606
Loyola-Chicago	10	–	8	.556	14	–	16	.467
Indiana State	9	–	9	.500	13	–	17	.433
Illinois State	6	–	12	.333	8	–	22	.267
Wichita State	5	–	13	.278	8	–	22	.267
Bradley	4	–	14	.222	9	–	22	.290
Evansville	1	–	17	.056	3	–	28	.097
† 2016 MVC tournament winner As of March 24, 2016; Rankings from AP poll

2015–16 Mountain West Conference women's basketball standings
	Conf.				Overall
Team	W		L	PCT	W		L	PCT
No. 22 Colorado State †	18	–	0	1.000	31	–	2	.939
Fresno State	15	–	3	.833	22	–	12	.647
Boise State	12	–	6	.667	19	–	11	.633
San Jose State	11	–	7	.611	13	–	17	.433
UNLV	9	–	9	.500	18	–	14	.563
New Mexico	9	–	9	.500	17	–	15	.531
Utah State	8	–	10	.444	14	–	17	.452
Wyoming	6	–	12	.333	13	–	16	.448
San Diego State	6	–	12	.333	12	–	19	.387
Nevada	4	–	14	.222	5	–	25	.167
Air Force	1	–	17	.056	1	–	29	.033
† 2016 MWC tournament winner Rankings from AP poll

2015–16 Northeast Conference women's basketball standings
	Conf.				Overall
Team	W		L	PCT	W		L	PCT
Sacred Heart	16	–	2	.889	20	–	13	.606
Bryant	14	–	4	.778	18	–	13	.581
Robert Morris†	11	–	7	.611	20	–	13	.606
Saint Francis (PA)	11	–	7	.611	15	–	17	.469
Central Connecticut	9	–	9	.500	12	–	18	.400
Fairleigh Dickinson	8	–	10	.444	11	–	21	.344
LIU Brooklyn	7	–	11	.389	9	–	21	.300
Mount St. Mary's	7	–	11	.389	9	–	21	.300
St. Francis Brooklyn	4	–	14	.222	7	–	22	.241
Wagner	3	–	15	.167	5	–	24	.172
† 2016 NEC tournament winner As of March 19, 2016; Rankings from AP poll

2015–16 Ohio Valley Conference women's basketball standings
	Conf.				Overall
Team	W		L	PCT	W		L	PCT
UT Martin	14	–	2	.875	22	–	9	.710
Belmont †	13	–	3	.813	24	–	9	.727
SIU Edwardsville	12	–	4	.750	18	–	12	.600
Eastern Kentucky	10	–	6	.625	18	–	12	.600
Southeast Missouri State	8	–	8	.500	15	–	16	.484
Austin Peay	8	–	8	.500	10	–	20	.333
Murray State	7	–	9	.438	12	–	17	.414
Tennessee State	7	–	9	.438	12	–	18	.400
Tennessee Tech	6	–	10	.375	10	–	19	.345
Jacksonville State	5	–	11	.313	10	–	18	.357
Morehead State	4	–	12	.250	10	–	20	.333
Eastern Illinois	2	–	14	.125	3	–	25	.107
† 2016 OVC tournament winner As of March 21, 2016; Rankings from AP poll

2015–16 Pac-12 Conference women's basketball standings
	Conf.				Overall
Team	W		L	PCT	W		L	PCT
No. 6 Oregon State †	16	–	2	.889	32	–	5	.865
No. 11 Arizona State	16	–	2	.889	26	–	7	.788
No. 13 Stanford	14	–	4	.778	27	–	8	.771
No. 10 UCLA	14	–	4	.778	26	–	9	.743
Washington	11	–	7	.611	26	–	11	.703
Oregon	9	–	9	.500	24	–	11	.686
Utah	8	–	10	.444	18	–	15	.545
USC	6	–	12	.333	19	–	13	.594
Washington State	5	–	13	.278	14	–	16	.467
California	4	–	14	.222	15	–	17	.469
Arizona	3	–	15	.167	13	–	19	.406
Colorado	2	–	16	.111	7	–	23	.233
† 2016 Pac-12 Tournament winner As of April 3, 2016; Rankings from AP Poll

2015–16 Patriot League women's basketball standings
	Conf.				Overall
Team	W		L	PCT	W		L	PCT
Army †	17	–	1	.944	29	–	3	.906
Bucknell	17	–	1	.944	25	–	8	.758
Loyola (MD)	11	–	7	.611	16	–	16	.500
Lehigh	10	–	8	.556	18	–	13	.581
Holy Cross	10	–	8	.556	13	–	17	.433
Navy	9	–	9	.500	15	–	15	.500
American	5	–	13	.278	8	–	23	.258
Colgate	4	–	14	.222	7	–	23	.233
Lafayette	4	–	14	.222	6	–	23	.207
Boston University	3	–	15	.167	3	–	27	.100
† 2016 Patriot League tournament winner As of March 19, 2016; Rankings from AP poll

2015–16 SEC women's basketball standings
	Conf.				Overall
Team	W		L	PCT	W		L	PCT
No. 3 South Carolina †	16	–	0	1.000	33	–	2	.943
No. 15 Mississippi State	11	–	5	.688	28	–	8	.778
No. 18 Texas A&M	11	–	5	.688	22	–	10	.688
No. 12 Kentucky	10	–	6	.625	25	–	8	.758
No. 25 Florida	10	–	6	.625	22	–	9	.710
Georgia	9	–	7	.563	21	–	10	.677
Missouri	8	–	8	.500	22	–	10	.688
Tennessee	8	–	8	.500	22	–	14	.611
Auburn	8	–	8	.500	20	–	13	.606
Arkansas	7	–	9	.438	12	–	18	.400
Vanderbilt	5	–	11	.313	18	–	14	.563
Alabama	4	–	12	.250	15	–	16	.484
LSU	3	–	13	.188	10	–	21	.323
Ole Miss	2	–	14	.125	10	–	20	.333
† 2016 SEC tournament winner As of March 27, 2016; Rankings from AP poll

2015–16 Southern Conference women's basketball standings
	Conf.				Overall
Team	W		L	PCT	W		L	PCT
Chattanooga †	12	–	2	.857	24	–	8	.750
Mercer*	12	–	2	.857	24	–	9	.727
Samford	11	–	3	.786	20	–	11	.645
East Tennessee State	8	–	6	.571	16	–	14	.533
Furman	7	–	7	.500	15	–	16	.484
Wofford	3	–	11	.214	9	–	20	.310
Western Carolina	3	–	11	.214	6	–	22	.214
UNC Greensboro	0	–	14	.000	8	–	22	.267
† 2016 SoCon Tournament winner As of March 18, 2016; Rankings from AP poll

2015–16 Southland Conference women's basketball standings
	Conf.				Overall
Team	W		L	PCT	W		L	PCT
Abilene Christian*	17	–	1	.944	26	–	4	.867
Central Arkansas †	16	–	2	.889	28	–	4	.875
Northwestern State	13	–	5	.722	19	–	12	.613
Stephen F. Austin	12	–	6	.667	18	–	12	.600
McNeese State	11	–	7	.611	20	–	13	.606
Houston Baptist	9	–	9	.500	14	–	15	.483
Nicholls State	8	–	10	.444	10	–	19	.345
Sam Houston State	7	–	11	.389	14	–	18	.438
Lamar	7	–	11	.389	12	–	19	.387
Texas A&M–CC	6	–	12	.333	9	–	20	.310
New Orleans	5	–	13	.278	8	–	19	.296
Incarnate Word*	3	–	15	.167	6	–	23	.207
SE Louisiana	3	–	15	.167	4	–	25	.138
† 2016 Southland tournament winner As of March 18, 2016 *ineligible for postseason play due to Div. I transition Rankings from AP poll

2015–16 SWAC women's basketball standings
	Conf.				Overall
Team	W		L	PCT	W		L	PCT
Jackson State	0	–	0	–	2	–	1	.667
Prairie View A&M	0	–	0	–	2	–	1	.667
Southern	0	–	0	–	2	–	2	.500
Alcorn State	0	–	0	–	1	–	2	.333
Alabama State	0	–	0	–	1	–	3	.250
Arkansas–Pine Bluff	0	–	0	–	1	–	3	.250
Grambling State	0	–	0	–	1	–	3	.250
Texas Southern	0	–	0	–	0	–	2	.000
Alabama A&M	0	–	0	–	0	–	4	.000
Mississippi Valley State	0	–	0	–	0	–	4	.000
† 2016 SWAC tournament winner As of November 27, 2015; Rankings from AP poll

2015–16 Sun Belt Conference women's basketball standings
	Conf.				Overall
Team	W		L	PCT	W		L	PCT
Arkansas State	19	–	1	.950	26	–	5	.839
Little Rock	16	–	4	.800	20	–	12	.625
Louisiana–Lafayette	13	–	7	.650	21	–	10	.677
Troy †	12	–	8	.600	20	–	13	.606
South Alabama	11	–	9	.550	15	–	15	.500
UT Arlington	10	–	10	.500	15	–	16	.484
Texas State	7	–	13	.350	12	–	19	.387
Appalachian State	7	–	13	.350	10	–	20	.333
Louisiana–Monroe	6	–	14	.300	12	–	17	.414
Georgia State	5	–	15	.250	10	–	19	.345
Georgia Southern	4	–	16	.200	7	–	22	.241
† 2016 Sun Belt tournament winner

2015–16 Summit League women's basketball standings
	Conf.				Overall
Team	W		L	PCT	W		L	PCT
South Dakota	15	–	1	.938	32	–	6	.842
South Dakota State †	13	–	3	.813	27	–	7	.794
IUPUI	11	–	5	.688	21	–	11	.656
Oral Roberts	10	–	6	.625	14	–	16	.467
Western Illinois	8	–	8	.500	16	–	16	.500
Omaha	7	–	9	.438	15	–	15	.500
IPFW	3	–	13	.188	7	–	23	.233
Denver	3	–	13	.188	5	–	25	.167
North Dakota State	2	–	14	.125	7	–	22	.241
† 2016 Summit League Tournament winner As of April 2, 2016; Rankings from AP Poll

2015–16 West Coast Conference women's basketball standings
	Conf.				Overall
Team	W		L	PCT	W		L	PCT
BYU	16	–	2	.889	26	–	7	.788
Saint Mary's	14	–	4	.778	24	–	8	.750
San Diego	13	–	5	.722	24	–	8	.750
Santa Clara	13	–	5	.722	23	–	9	.719
Gonzaga	10	–	8	.556	19	–	14	.576
San Francisco †	9	–	9	.500	21	–	12	.636
Pacific	6	–	12	.333	13	–	17	.433
Loyola Marymount	6	–	12	.333	11	–	20	.355
Pepperdine	2	–	16	.111	7	–	24	.226
Portland	1	–	17	.056	3	–	27	.100
† Tournament winner As of March 22, 2016; Rankings from AP poll

2015–16 WAC women's basketball standings
	Conf.				Overall
Team	W		L	PCT	W		L	PCT
New Mexico State †	13	–	1	.929	26	–	5	.839
UTRGV	9	–	5	.643	19	–	14	.576
Grand Canyon*	8	–	6	.571	16	–	15	.516
Utah Valley	8	–	6	.571	16	–	15	.516
Cal State Bakersfield	8	–	6	.571	12	–	19	.387
UMKC	5	–	9	.357	10	–	18	.357
Seattle	3	–	11	.214	9	–	21	.300
Chicago State	2	–	12	.143	4	–	25	.138
† 2016 WAC tournament winner As of March 18, 2016 * Grand Canyon ineligible for WAC Basketball Tournament as part of reclassification from Division II; Rankings from AP poll

== Award winners ==
=== All-America teams ===
The NCAA has never recognized a consensus All-America team in women's basketball. This differs from the practice in men's basketball, in which the NCAA uses a combination of selections by the Associated Press (AP), the National Association of Basketball Coaches (NABC), the Sporting News, and the United States Basketball Writers Association (USBWA) to determine a consensus All-America team. The selection of a consensus team is possible because all four organizations select at least a first and second team, with only the USBWA not selecting a third team.

However, of the major selectors in women's basketball, only the AP divides its selections into separate teams. The women's counterpart to the NABC, the Women's Basketball Coaches Association (WBCA), selects a single 10-member (plus ties) team, as does the USBWA. The NCAA does not recognize Sporting News as an All-America selector in women's basketball.

"Consensus" All-Americans
Player	Position	Class	School	AP	USBWA	WBCA
Nina Davis	F	Junior	Baylor	2nd	Yes	Yes
Moriah Jefferson	G	Senior	Connecticut	1st	Yes	Yes
Kelsey Mitchell	G	Sophomore	Ohio State	1st	Yes	Yes
Kelsey Plum	G	Junior	Washington	2nd	Yes	Yes
Breanna Stewart	PF/SF	Senior	Connecticut	1st	Yes	Yes
Morgan Tuck	F	Senior	Connecticut	2nd	No	Yes
Brianna Turner	F	Sophomore	Notre Dame	2nd	Yes	Yes
Jamie Weisner	G	Senior	Oregon State	2nd	No	Yes
A'ja Wilson	F	Sophomore	South Carolina	1st	Yes	Yes
Courtney Williams	G	Senior	South Florida	No	No	Yes
Rachel Banham	G	Senior	Minnesota	1st	Yes	No

AP 3rd Team
Third Team All-Americans
Jillian Alleyne, Oregon, F, 6-3, sr.
Myisha Hines-Allen, Louisville, F, 6-2, so.
Tiffany Mitchell, South Carolina, G, 5-9, sr. (USBWA All-American Team)
Aerial Powers, Michigan State, G, 6-4, redshirt jr.
Shatori Walker-Kimbrough, Maryland, G, 5-11, jr. (USBWA All-American Team)

=== Major player of the year awards ===
- Wooden Award: Breanna Stewart, Connecticut
- Naismith Award:Breanna Stewart, Connecticut
- Associated Press Player of the Year: Breanna Stewart, Connecticut
- Wade Trophy: Breanna Stewart, Connecticut
- espnW National Player of the Year:Breanna Stewart, Connecticut

=== Major freshman of the year awards ===
- USBWA National Freshman of the Year (USBWA): Kristine Anigwe, California

=== Major coach of the year awards ===
- Associated Press Coach of the Year: Geno Auriemma (Connecticut) (8th time)
- Naismith College Coach of the Year: Geno Auriemma (Connecticut) (7th time)
- WBCA National Coach of the Year Award: Geno Auriemma (Connecticut)

=== Other major awards ===
- Nancy Lieberman Award (best point guard): Moriah Jefferson (Connecticut) (2nd year)
- Senior CLASS Award (top senior): Breanna Stewart (Connecticut)
- Maggie Dixon Award (top first-year head coach): Joni Taylor (Georgia)
- Academic All-American of the Year (Top scholar-athlete): Ally Disterhoft, Iowa
- Elite 90 Award (Top GPA among upperclass players at Final Four): Ruth Hamblin (Oregon State)

== Coaching changes ==
Several teams changed coaches during and after the season.

Team	Former coach	Interim coach	New coach	Reason
Alabama A&M	Semeka Randall		Margaret Richards	Semeka Randall decided on leaving head coaching job at Alabama A&M. Margaret Richards will take over the reins as Alabama A&M, after spending the last 7 as assistant coach in 4 schools, before that being the head coach at St. Augustine College.
Albany	Katie Abrahamson-Henderson		Joanna Bernabei-McNamee	Abrahamson-Henderson left for the UCF coaching job. She was succeeded by Joanna Bernabei-McNamee, hired from NAIA school Pikeville.
Arizona	Niya Butts		Adia Barnes	Butts was fired at the end of the season. The Wildcats remained within the Pac-12 and the Arizona family for their new hire, tabbing former Wildcats player and current Washington assistant Barnes.
Bradley	Michael Brooks		Andrea Gorski	Brooks was fired at the end of the season. Gorski, a former Braves player, was hired from Southern Illinois, where she had been an assistant.
Campbell	Wanda Watkins		Ronny Fisher	Watkins chose to retire from coaching after a 35-year tenure at Campbell, but remained with the Lady Camels in an administrative position. Fisher was hired from Presbyterian.
Colgate	Nicci Hays Fort		Bill Cleary	Hays Fort resigned at the end of the season, and was replaced by Cleary, previously head coach at Division II Bloomsburg.
Colorado	Linda Lappe		JR Payne	Lappe resigned under pressure at the end of the season, and was replaced by Santa Clara head coach Payne.
Columbia	Stephanie Glance	Sheila Roux	Megan Griffith	Glance stepped down to be the new executive director of the Kay Yow Cancer Fund. Roux replaced Glance for the season as interim head coach, and in turn was replaced by Princeton assistant Griffith.
Coppin State	Derek Brown		DeWayne Burroughs	Derek Brown has retired from the Coppin State Eagles.
Eastern Michigan	Tory Verdi		Fred Castro	Verdi left for the UMass job. Former Washington Huskies Assistant Coach Fred Castro is named the 8th head coach in Eastern Michigan Eagles history.
Evansville	Oties Epps	Matt Ruffing	TBA	Epps left the program on Feb 29. Ruffing was named interim head coach.
FIU	Marlin Chinn	Tiara Malcolm		Chinn was fired at the end of the season. Top assistant Malcolm was first named as interim coach and then permanent head coach.
George Washington	Jonathan Tsipis		Jennifer Rizzotti	Tsipis left for the Wisconsin vacancy. Rizzotti was hired from Hartford.
Hartford	Jennifer Rizzotti		Kim McNeill	Rizzotti left for the George Washington opening. After spending last 6 years at Virginia as either assistant or associate coach, Kim McNeill will be the new head coach of Hartford.
Incarnate Word	Kate Henderson		Christy Smith	Henderson was fired at the end of the season. Former Arkansas assistant Smith was hired as her replacement.
IPFW	Chris Paul		Niecee Nelson	Paul (not to be confused with the NBA superstar) was fired at the end of the season. San Diego assistant Nelson was hired.
James Madison	Kenny Brooks		Sean O’Regan	Brooks left to take over at Virginia Tech. Top assistant O'Regan was promoted.
Kennesaw State	Nitra Perry		Agnus Berenato	Perry was relieved of her post as HC. Berenato, a former Pittsburgh head coach who had been out of head coaching for three seasons, was named as her replacement.
Kent State	Danielle O'Banion		Todd Starkey	O'Banion was fired at the end of the season and replaced by Indiana assistant Starkey.
Louisiana Tech	Tyler Summitt	Mickie DeMoss	Brooke Stoehr	Summitt resigned after the season, admitting to being involved in an "inappropriate relationship", which multiple media reports indicated was an extramarital affair with a player. Top assistant DeMoss was named as interim head coach, and several days later former Lady Techsters player and assistant Brooke Stoehr was hired from Northwestern State.
Loyola (Chicago)	Sheryl Swoopes		Kate Achter	Swoopes was fired during the offseason after three seasons with the Ramblers, and a 31–62 overall record, following a university investigation into allegations of mistreatment of players. A total of six players transferred out after her first two seasons, and Loyola granted transfer requests from 10 of the 12 returning players from the 2015–16 team. Swoopes was replaced by Xavier assistant Achter.
Manhattan	John Olenowski	Sonia Burke	Heather Vulin	Olenowski was relieved of his post as the HC. Burke was appointed to be the Interim HC after Olenwski was let go. Heather Vulin was named the next coach of the Lady Jaspers of Manhattan.
Massachusetts	Sharon Dawley		Tory Verdi	Dawley was fired at the end of the season, and replaced by Eastern Michigan head coach Verdi.
McNeese State	Brooks Donald-Williams		Kacie Cryer	Donald-Williams left to take an assistant's position at Alabama, and was replaced by top assistant Cryer.
Mississippi Valley State	Elvis Robinson		Jessica Kern	Robinson was fired at the end of the season, with Furman assistant Kern named as his replacement.
Montana	Robin Selvig		Shannon Schweyen	Selvig announced his retirement during the 2016 offseason after 38 seasons and 865 wins with the Lady Griz. Schweyen, who had been involved with the Montana program since 1988—first as arguably the greatest player in Lady Griz history, and then as an assistant for 24 seasons—was elevated to the top spot.
Morgan State	Donald Beasley	Ed Davis		Beasley has accepted another position at Morgan State, Ed Davis has succeeded Donald as the Interim Coach.
Nebraska	Connie Yori		Amy Williams	Yori resigned amid a university investigation into alleged mistreatment of players, and was replaced by Nebraska alum and South Dakota head coach Williams, fresh off the Coyotes' WNIT victory.
New Mexico	Yvonne Sanchez		Mike Bradbury	Sanchez was fired at the end of the season, and replaced by Wright State head coach Bradbury.
Norfolk State	Debra Clark	Larry Vickers		Clark was fired in midseason on January 20. Vickers was named interim head coach, and the Spartans removed the interim tag on March 9.
Northern Kentucky	Dawn Plitzuweit		Camryn Whitaker	Plitzuweit left for the South Dakota opening. Whitaker, a former assistant at Kentucky and Dayton, was named as her replacement.
Northwestern State	Brooke & Scott Stoehr		Jordan Dupuy	The husband-and-wife coaching team left when Brooke took the Louisiana Tech opening. Southern Miss assistant Dupuy was named as their replacement.
Prairie View A&M	Dawn Brown		Ravon Justice	Brown was fired after the season and replaced by Houston recruiting coordinator Justice.
Presbyterian	Ronny Fisher		Todd Steelman	Fisher left for the Campbell job. Former associate head coach of Maine, Todd Steelman will take the reins at Presbyterian.
Providence	Susan Robinson Fruchtl		Jim Crowley	Robinson Fruchtl left to become athletic director at Saint Francis of Pennsylvania. Jim Crowley was hired from St. Bonaventure.
Robert Morris	Sal Buscaglia		Charlie Buscaglia	Sal Buscaglia retired after 38 seasons and 712 wins. His son and top assistant Charlie took over.
St. Bonaventure	Jim Crowley		Jesse Fleming	Jim Crowley left for the Providence opening. Bonnies alum Jesse Fleming returned as Crowley's replacement after spending the last four seasons as an assistant at Bowling Green.
San Francisco	Jennifer Azzi		Molly Goodenbour	After leading the Dons to their first NCAA tournament bid in nearly two decades, Azzi unexpectedly resigned in September after six seasons. USF hired former Stanford star Goodenbour from Division II Cal State East Bay, which had hired her from fellow D-II school Cal State Dominguez Hills in June.
Santa Clara	JR Payne		Bill Carr	Payne left for the Colorado job. Carr, a former assistant at San Francisco, was hired from Division II Point Loma Nazarene.
Seattle	Joan Bonvicini	Kristen O'Neill Phillips	Suzy Barcomb	Bonvicini decided to leave Redhawks after the season. O'Neill Phillips was named interim coach. After winning her 300th game at Division II Cal State East Bay, Barcomb left to take over the Redhawks HC job.
South Dakota	Amy Williams		Dawn Plitzuweit	Williams left for the Nebraska job. Plitzuweit was hired from Northern Kentucky.
Southeastern Louisiana	Yolanda Moore	Aja Gibson	Errol Gauff	Moore was fired after the season. Top assistant Gibson was named interim head coach. The school went to its men's program for Moore's permanent replacement, with Gauff moving from men's assistant to women's head coach.
SMU	Rhonda Rompola		Travis Mays	Rompola announced her retirement in February, effective at season's end. The Mustangs hired top Texas assistant Mays.
Tennessee Tech	Jim Davis		Kim Rosamond	Davis retired at the end of the season and was replaced by Vanderbilt assistant Rosamond.
UC Irvine	Doug Oliver		Tamara Inoue	Oliver announced in January that he would retire, effective at season's end. New Mexico State assistant Inoue was named as his replacement.
UCF	Joi Williams		Katie Abrahamson-Henderson	Williams was fired at the end of the season, and replaced by Albany's Abrahamson-Henderson.
UNC Greensboro	Wendy Palmer		Trina Patterson	Palmer was fired at the end of the season. She was replaced by Old Dominion assistant Patterson, also a former head coach at Albany and Maryland–Eastern Shore.
Vanderbilt	Melanie Balcomb		Stephanie White	Balcomb resigned after the season, citing family reasons, leaving as Vanderbilt's winningest women's coach with 310 wins in 14 seasons. Indiana Fever head coach Stephanie White was named as Balcomb's replacement, officially taking over the Commodores once the Fever's 2016 season ends.
Vermont	Lori Gear McBride	Courtnay Pilypaitis	Chris Day	McBride was fired during the season. Former UVM player and current assistant Pilypaitis was named interim head coach. Former Penn assistant Chris Day was later named as the permanent replacement.
Virginia Tech	Dennis Wolff	Britney Anderson	Kenny Brooks	Wolff was fired at the end of the season. Anderson was assigned as interim head coach, but the permanent job was filled less than a week later by James Madison's Brooks.
Wagner	Lisa Cermignano		Heather Jacobs	Cermignano was fired after the season. Wagner also went to Division II for its new hire, luring Jacobs from Adelphi.
Wisconsin	Bobbie Kelsey		Jonathan Tsipis	Kelsey was fired at the end of the season and replaced by George Washington head coach Tsipis.
Wofford	Edgar I. Farmer, Jr.		Jimmy Garrity	Farmer, Jr. was relieved of his duties at season's end. Former Anderson University (NCAA D2) HC, Jimmy Garrity moving up to take the reins of the Terriers.
Wright State	Mike Bradbury		Katrina Merriweather	Bradbury left for the New Mexico opening. Katrina Merriweather, former assistant WSU Raiders Coach, was hired as the head coach.

== See also ==
- 2015–16 NCAA Division I men's basketball season
