= 2015–16 Penn Quakers women's basketball team =

Intercollegiate basketball season

2015–16 Penn Quakers women's basketball

Ivy League Regular Season Champions

NCAA Women's Tournament, first round
- Conference: Ivy League
- Record: 24–5 (13–1 Ivy)
- Head coach: Mike McLaughlin (7th season)
- Assistant coaches: Chris Day; Bernadette Laukaitis
- Home arena: Palestra

2015–16 Ivy League women's basketball standings
| | Conf. | | | | Overall |
| Team | W | | L | PCT | W | | L | PCT |
|---|---|---|---|---|---|---|---|---|
| Penn† | 13 | – | 1 | .929 | 24 | – | 5 | .828 |
| Princeton | 12 | – | 2 | .857 | 23 | – | 6 | .793 |
| Harvard | 9 | – | 5 | .643 | 14 | – | 14 | .500 |
| Dartmouth | 7 | – | 7 | .500 | 12 | – | 18 | .400 |
| Cornell | 6 | – | 8 | .429 | 14 | – | 14 | .500 |
| Yale | 5 | – | 9 | .357 | 14 | – | 17 | .452 |
| Brown | 3 | – | 11 | .214 | 15 | – | 13 | .536 |
| Columbia | 1 | – | 13 | .071 | 12 | – | 17 | .414 |
† Ivy League winner As of March 19, 2016; Rankings from AP Poll

The 2015–16 Penn Quakers women's basketball team represented the University of Pennsylvania during the 2015–16 NCAA Division I women's basketball season. The Quakers, led by seventh year head coach Mike McLaughlin, play their home games at the Palestra and were members of the Ivy League. Penn finished the season 24–5, 13–1 to win the Ivy League regular season title to earn an automatic trip to the NCAA women's tournament, where they lost in the first round to Washington.

== Previous season ==
The Quakers finished the 2014-15 season at 21–9, 11–3 to earn an automatic bid to the 2015 Women's National Invitation Tournament, where they lost to Temple in the second round.

== Current season ==
The Ivy League championship came down to the final game between Penn and Princeton for the second time in three seasons. Both entered the final game with the same 12–1 record, so the final regular-season game would mean the conference championship and automatic invitation to the NCAA tournament. Penn led much of the game, but Princeton took a one point lead with two minutes left in the game. Penn responded with a three-point shot to take a two point lead. Although Princeton had a chance to tie the game, they failed to do so, and Penn finished with the win, the conference championship, and an invitation to the 2016 NCAA tournament.

== Roster ==
2015–16 Penn Quakers women's basketball team
Players
Coaches

| Pos. | # | Name | Height | Year | Hometown |
|---|---|---|---|---|---|
| F | 2 | Jackie Falconer | 6 ft 0 in (1.83 m) | Jr | Mechanicsburg, Pa. |
| G | 4 | Brooklyn Juday (C) | 5 ft 9 in (1.75 m) | Sr | Tipton, Ind. |
| G | 5 | Kathleen Roche | 5 ft 11 in (1.8 m) | Sr | River Forest, Ill. |
| G | 10 | Anna Ross | 5 ft 9 in (1.75 m) | So | Syracuse, N.Y. |
| G | 12 | Kasey Chambers (C) | 5 ft 7 in (1.7 m) | Sr | Belmar, N.J. |
| C | 13 | Sydney Stipanovich (C) | 6 ft 3 in (1.91 m) | Jr | St. Louis, Mo. |
| G | 14 | Beth Brzozowski | 5 ft 8 in (1.73 m) | So | Highland Heights, Ohio |
| F | 15 | Sade Gibbons | 6 ft 1 in (1.85 m) | Jr | Springfield Gardens, N.Y. |
| G | 21 | Lauren Whitlatch | 5 ft 11 in (1.8 m) | So | Bloomington, Ind. |
| G | 22 | Deja Jackson | 5 ft 8 in (1.73 m) | Fr | Grinnell, Io. |
| G | 23 | Kristen Daley | 6 ft 1 in (1.85 m) | Fr | Sharon, Ma. |
| G | 24 | Alexis Glasgow | 5 ft 10 in (1.78 m) | So | Arlington Heights, Ill. |
| G | 25 | Ashley Russell | 5 ft 10 in (1.78 m) | Fr | Braintree, Mass. |
| G | 33 | Keiera Ray (C) | 5 ft 9 in (1.75 m) | Sr | Aurora, Ill. |
| F | 42 | Jameira Johnson | 6 ft 1 in (1.85 m) | Fr | Taneytown, Md. |
| F | 43 | Michelle Nwokedi | 6 ft 3 in (1.91 m) | So | Missouri City, Texas |
| F | 50 | Princess Aghayere | 6 ft 0 in (1.83 m) | Fr | Reston, Va. |

Head coach

- Mike McLaughlin

Assistant coach(es)

- Chris Day
- Bernadette Laukaitis

Legend

- (C) Team captain
- (S) Suspended
- (I) Ineligible
- (W) Walk-on
- Injured
- Current redshirt

Roster
Last update: October 21, 2015

== Schedule ==
| Date time, TV | Rank^{#} | Opponent^{#} | Result | Record | Site (attendance) city, state |
Regular season
| Nov 13, 2015*; 8:00 pm | | No. 14 Duke | L 50–59 | 0–1 | Palestra (2,587); Philadelphia, PA |
| Nov 15, 2015*; 5:00 pm | | at UMBC | W 81–46 | 1–1 | Retriever Activities Center (514); Baltimore, MD |
| Nov 17, 2015*; 7:00 pm | | Lafayette | W 54–37 | 2–1 | Palestra (413); Philadelphia, PA |
| Nov 22, 2015*; 1:00 pm | | at New Hampshire | W 67–60 | 3–1 | Lundholm Gym (393); Durham, NH |
| Nov 24, 2015*; 7:00 pm | | Colorado State | W 49–48 | 4–1 | Palestra (393); Philadelphia, PA |
| Dec 5, 2015*; 2:00 pm, ESPN3 | | Navy | W 57–43 | 5–1 | Palestra (387); Philadelphia, PA |
| Dec 8, 2015*; 5:00 pm | | at Saint Joseph's | L 46–50 | 5–2 | Hagan Arena; Philadelphia, PA |
| Dec 19, 2015*; Noon | | Drexel; Battle of 33rd Street | W 72–67 | 6–2 | Palestra (1,407); Philadelphia, PA |
| Dec 21, 2015*; 1:00 pm | | Wagner | W 78–50 | 7–2 | Palestra (403); Philadelphia, PA |
| Dec 31, 2015*; 8:00 pm | | at BYU–Hawaii | W 73–41 | 8–2 | George Q. Cannon Activities Center (113); Laie, Hawaii |
| Jan 3, 2016*; 1:00 am | | at Hawaii | W 64–54 | 9–2 | Stan Sheriff Center (1,810); Honolulu, HI |
| Jan 9, 2016; 1:00 pm | | Princeton | W 50–48 | 10–2 (1–0) | Palestra; Philadelphia, PA |
| Jan 18, 2016*; 7:00 pm | | at La Salle | W 78–68 | 11–2 | Tom Gola Arena (385); Philadelphia, PA |
| Jan 21, 2016*; 7:00 pm | | at Temple | W 60–54 | 12–2 | Liacouras Center (1,003); Philadelphia, PA |
| Jan 26, 2016*; 7:00 pm | | at Villanova | L 46–66 | 12–3 | The Pavilion (809); Villanova, PA |
| Jan 29, 2016; 7:00 pm, ESPN3 | | Yale | W 68–49 | 13–3 (2–0) | Palestra (497); Philadelphia, PA |
| Jan 30, 2016; 7:00 pm | | Brown | W 66–49 | 14–3 (3–0) | Palestra (442); Philadelphia, PA |
| Feb 5, 2016; 6:00 pm | | at Harvard | W 68–48 | 15–3 (4–0) | Lavietes Pavilion (831); Cambridge, MA |
| Feb 6, 2016; 6:00 pm | | at Dartmouth | W 56–41 | 16–3 (5–0) | Leede Arena (619); Hanover, NH |
| Feb 12, 2016; 7:00 pm | | Columbia | W 71–51 | 17–3 (6–0) | Palestra (641); Philadelphia, PA |
| Feb 13, 2016; 7:00 pm | | Cornell | W 65–50 | 18–3 (7–0) | Palestra (625); Philadelphia, PA |
| Feb 19, 2016; 7:00 pm | | at Brown | W 69–59 | 19–3 (8–0) | Pizzitola Sports Center (380); Providence, RI |
| Feb 20, 2016; 7:00 pm | | at Yale | W 77–59 | 20–3 (9–0) | John J. Lee Amphitheater (238); New Haven, CT |
| Feb 26, 2016; 7:00 pm | | at Cornell | L 46–51 | 20–4 (9–1) | Newman Arena (634); Ithaca, NY |
| Feb 28, 2016; 3:00 pm, ASN | | at Columbia | W 60–42 | 21–4 (10–1) | Levien Gymnasium (587); New York, NY |
| Mar 4, 2016; 7:00 pm | | Dartmouth | W 65–50 | 22–4 (11–1) | Palestra (1,115); Philadelphia, PA |
| Mar 5, 2016; 7:00 pm | | Harvard | W 62–46 | 23–4 (12–1) | Palestra (1,180); Philadelphia, PA |
| Mar 8, 2016; 5:30 pm, ESPN3 | | at Princeton | W 62–60 | 24–4 (13–1) | Jadwin Gymnasium (1,278); Princeton, NJ |
NCAA Women's Tournament
| Mar 19, 2016*; 4:00 pm, ESPN2 | (10 L) | vs. (7 L) Washington; First Round | L 53–65 | 24–5 | Xfinity Center (5,374); College Park, MD |
*Non-conference game. ^{#}Rankings from AP Poll. (#) Tournament seedings in parentheses. L=Lexington Region.

== See also ==
- 2015–16 Penn Quakers men's basketball team
