= 2016 SWAC women's basketball tournament =

- Classification: Division I
- Season: 2015–16
- Teams: 10
- Site: Toyota Center; Houston, Texas
- Champions: Alabama State (4th title)
- Winning coach: Freda Freeman-Jackson (3rd title)
- MVP: Britney Wright (Alabama State)
- Television: SWAC Digital Network, ESPN3

2015–16 SWAC women's basketball standings
	Conf.				Overall
Team	W		L	PCT	W		L	PCT
Jackson State	0	–	0	–	2	–	1	.667
Prairie View A&M	0	–	0	–	2	–	1	.667
Southern	0	–	0	–	2	–	2	.500
Alcorn State	0	–	0	–	1	–	2	.333
Alabama State	0	–	0	–	1	–	3	.250
Arkansas–Pine Bluff	0	–	0	–	1	–	3	.250
Grambling State	0	–	0	–	1	–	3	.250
Texas Southern	0	–	0	–	0	–	2	.000
Alabama A&M	0	–	0	–	0	–	4	.000
Mississippi Valley State	0	–	0	–	0	–	4	.000
† 2016 SWAC tournament winner As of November 27, 2015; Rankings from AP poll

The 2016 SWAC women's basketball tournament was the postseason women's basketball tournament for the Southwestern Athletic Conference. The tournament was held from March 8–12, 2016 at the Toyota Center in Houston, Texas The champion received the conference's automatic bid to the 2016 NCAA Division I women's basketball tournament. Alabama State won the conference tournament championship game over Southern University, 55–51.

== Seeds ==
All 10 SWAC teams participated in the Tournament. Alcorn State was ineligible for NCAA postseason play due to APR violations. Had Alcorn State won the tournament, the SWAC's bid would have been awarded to the highest remaining seed still in the field. The top 6 teams received a bye into the Quarterfinals.

Teams were seeded by record within the conference, with a tiebreaker system to seed teams with identical conference records.

Seed	School	Conference	Tiebreaker
1	Alabama State	14–4	
2	Texas Southern	14–4	
3	Southern	14–4	
4	Grambling State	13–5	
5	Prairie View A&M	9–9	
6	Jackson State	8–10	
7	Alcorn State	8–10	
8	Arkansas-Pine Bluff	6–12	
9	Alabama A&M	3–15	
10	Mississippi Valley State	1–17	

== Schedule ==
Session	Game	Time*	Matchup^{#}	Score	Television
First round – Tuesday, March 8
1	1	12:00 pm	#7 Alcorn State vs. #10 Mississippi Valley State	62–43	SWAC Digital Network
1	2	6:00 pm	#8 Arkansas-Pine Bluff vs. #9 Alabama A&M	74–82	SWAC Digital Network
Quarterfinals – Wednesday, March 9
2	3	12:00 pm	#2 Southern vs. #7 Alcorn State	61–57	SWAC Digital Network
2	4	6:00 pm	#1 Alabama State vs. #8 Alabama A&M	87–72	SWAC Digital Network
Quarterfinals – Thursday, March 10
3	5	12:00 pm	#3 Texas Southern vs #6 Jackson State	65–47	SWAC Digital Network
3	6	6:00 pm	#4 Grambling State vs. #5 Prairie View A&M	60–56	SWAC Digital Network
Semifinals – Friday, March 11
4	7	12:00 pm	#2 Southern vs. #3 Texas Southern	62–54	SWAC Digital Network
4	8	6:00 pm	#1 Alabama State vs. #4 Grambling State	64–50	SWAC Digital Network
Championship – Saturday, March 12
5	9	2:00 pm	#1 Alabama State vs. #2 Southern	55–51	ESPN3
*Game times in Central Time. #Rankings denote tournament seeding.

== Bracket ==
First round Tuesday March 8
8	Arkansas-Pine Bluff	74
9	Alabama A&M	82
7	Alcorn State	62
10	Mississippi Valley State	43

Quarterfinals; Wednesday, March 9 Thursday, March 10
1	Alabama State	87
8	Alabama A&M	72
4	Grambling State	60
5	Prairie View A&M	56
2	Southern	61
7	Alcorn State	57
3	Texas Southern	62
6	Jackson State	47

Semifinals; Friday, March 11
1	Alabama State	64
4	Grambling State	50
2	Southern	62
3	Texas Southern	54

Championship; Saturday, March 12; ESPN3
1	Alabama State	55
2	Southern	51
