= 2016 MEAC women's basketball tournament =

Basketball Tournament

- Classification: Division I
- Season: 2015–16
- Teams: 13
- Site: Norfolk Scope; Norfolk, Virginia
- Champions: Hampton (6th title)
- Winning coach: Edward Joyner (3rd title)
- MVP: Reginald Johnson (Hampton)
- Television: ESPN3, ESPNU

2015–16 MEAC women's basketball standings
	Conf.				Overall
Team	W		L	PCT	W		L	PCT
North Carolina A&T †	12	–	4	.750	19	–	11	.633
Bethune-Cookman	12	–	4	.750	18	–	12	.600
Hampton	11	–	5	.688	14	–	17	.452
Coppin State	10	–	6	.625	16	–	16	.500
Morgan State	10	–	6	.625	13	–	17	.433
Maryland-Eastern Shore	10	–	6	.625	12	–	17	.414
Florida A&M	9	–	7	.563	16	–	15	.516
South Carolina State	7	–	9	.438	13	–	16	.448
Savannah State	7	–	9	.438	10	–	18	.357
Delaware State	6	–	10	.375	9	–	21	.300
Howard	4	–	12	.250	7	–	24	.226
North Carolina Central	3	–	13	.188	5	–	23	.179
Norfolk State	3	–	13	.188	3	–	24	.111
† 2016 MEAC tournament winner Rankings from AP poll

The 2016 MEAC women's basketball tournament took place March 7–12, 2016, at the Norfolk Scope in Norfolk, Virginia The champion will receive the conference's automatic bid to the 2016 NCAA tournament.

== Seeds ==
All 13 teams contested the tournament.

Teams were seeded by record within the conference, with a tiebreaker system to seed teams with identical conference records.

Seed	School	Conference	Tiebreaker 1	Tiebreaker 2	Tiebreaker 3	Tiebreaker 4	Tiebreaker 5	Tiebreaker 6	Tiebreaker 7
1	Bethune-Cookman	12-4	1-1 vs. North Carolina A&T	0-1 vs. Hampton	1-0 vs. Coppin State				
2	North Carolina A&T	12–4	1-1 vs. Bethune-Cookman	0-1 vs. Hampton	0-1 vs. Coppin State				
3	Hampton	11-5							
4	Coppin State	10–6	2-1 vs. Morgan State/UMES						
5	Morgan State	10-6	2-2 vs. Coppin/UMES						
6	Maryland Eastern Shore	10-6	1-2 vs. Coppin/Morgan State						
7	Florida A&M	9-7							
8	Savannah State	7–9	1-1 vs. South Carolina State	0-1 vs. Bethune-Coookman	0-2 vs. North Carolina A&T	0-1 vs. Hampton	1-0 vs. Coppin State	0-1 vs. Morgan State	1-0 vs. UMES
9	South Carolina State	7-9	1-1 vs. Savannah State	0-1 vs. Bethune-Coookman	0-1 vs. North Carolina A&T	0-1 vs. Hampton	1-0 vs. Coppin State	0-1 vs. Morgan State	0-1 vs. UMES
10	Delaware State	6–10							
11	Howard	4-12							
12	North Carolina Central	3-13	1-0 vs. Norfolk State						
13	Norfolk State	3-13	0-1 vs. North Carolina Central						
† – MEAC regular season champions. Overall records are as of the end of the regular season.

== Schedule ==
Session	Game	Time*	Matchup^{#}	Score	Television
First round – Monday, March 7
1	1	11:00 am	#4 Coppin State vs. #13 Norfolk State	78-54	ESPN3
1	2	1:00 pm	#5 Morgan State vs. #12 NC Central	52-42	ESPN3
1	3	3:00 pm	#6 Maryland Eastern Shore vs. #11 Howard	68-51	ESPN3
First round – Tuesday, March 8
2	4	Noon	#8 Savannah State vs. #9 South Carolina State	61-53	ESPN3
2	5	2:00 pm	#7 Florida A&M vs. #10 Delaware State	79-74	ESPN3
Quarterfinals – Wednesday, March 9
3	6	Noon	#1 Bethune-Cookman vs. #9 South Carolina State	56-48	ESPN3
3	7	2:00 pm	#2 North Carolina A&T vs. #7 Florida A&M	67-50	ESPN3
Quarterfinals – Thursday, March 10
5	8	Noon	#3 Hampton vs. #11 Howard	64-58	ESPN3
5	9	2:00 pm	#4 Coppin State vs. #5 Morgan State	63-53	ESPN3
Semifinals – Friday, March 11
6	10	Noon	#4 Coppin State vs. #9 South Carolina State	81-62	ESPN3
6	11	2:00 pm	#2 North Carolina A&T vs. #3 Hampton	63-54	ESPN3
Championship – Saturday, March 12
8	12	6:00pm	#2 North Carolina A&T vs. #4 Coppin State	65-46	ESPN3
*Game times in EST. #-Rankings denote tournament seeding.

== Bracket ==
First round March 7/8
8	Savannah State	53
9	South Carolina State	61
4	Coppin State	78
13	Norfolk State	54
5	Morgan State	52
12	North Carolina Central	42
7	Florida A&M	79
10	Delaware State	74
6	Maryland Eastern Shore	51
11	Howard	68

Quarterfinals; March 9/10
1	Bethune-Cookman	48
9	South Carolina State	56
4	Coppin State	63
5	Morgan State	53
2	North Carolina A&T	67
7	Florida A&M	50
3	Hampton	64
11	Howard	58

Semifinals; March 11
9	South Carolina State	62
4	Coppin State	81
2	North Carolina A&T	63
3	Hampton	54

Championship; March 12
4	Coppin State	46
2	North Carolina A&T	65

* denotes overtime period
