= 2015–16 Savannah State Lady Tigers basketball team =

Intercollegiate basketball season

2015–16 Savannah State Tigers women's basketball
- Conference: Mid-Eastern Athletic Conference

Ranking
- Coaches: No. NR
- AP: No. NR
- Record: 6-12 (3-4 MEAC)
- Head coach: Cedric Baker (12th season)
- Assistant coaches: Summer Dalton; Brenda Warren; Ronald Booker

2015–16 MEAC women's basketball standings
	Conf.				Overall
Team	W		L	PCT	W		L	PCT
North Carolina A&T †	12	–	4	.750	19	–	11	.633
Bethune-Cookman	12	–	4	.750	18	–	12	.600
Hampton	11	–	5	.688	14	–	17	.452
Coppin State	10	–	6	.625	16	–	16	.500
Morgan State	10	–	6	.625	13	–	17	.433
Maryland-Eastern Shore	10	–	6	.625	12	–	17	.414
Florida A&M	9	–	7	.563	16	–	15	.516
South Carolina State	7	–	9	.438	13	–	16	.448
Savannah State	7	–	9	.438	10	–	18	.357
Delaware State	6	–	10	.375	9	–	21	.300
Howard	4	–	12	.250	7	–	24	.226
North Carolina Central	3	–	13	.188	5	–	23	.179
Norfolk State	3	–	13	.188	3	–	24	.111
† 2016 MEAC tournament winner Rankings from AP poll

The 2015–16 Savannah State Lady Tigers Basketball Team represented Savannah State University. The Tigers were coached by their 12th year coach, Mr. Cedric Baker. They played their home games in Tiger Arena.

== Roster ==
2015–16 Savannah State Tigers women's basketball team
Players
Coaches

Pos.	#	Name	Height	Year	Hometown
C	1	Caprisha Treadwell	6 ft 2 in (1.88 m)	Jr	Chicago
G	2	Kenyata Hendrix	5 ft 10 in (1.78 m)	Jr	Carrollton, Georgia
G	3	Taylor-Ashley Shaw	5 ft 9 in (1.75 m)	Jr	Fort Lauderdale, Florida
G	4	Jacqueline Anderson	5 ft 6 in (1.68 m)	Jr	Savannah, Georgia
G	5	Lauryn Fields	5 ft 5 in (1.65 m)	So	Cape May Court House, New Jersey
G	10	Kilah Nixon	5 ft 7 in (1.7 m)	So	Brunswick, Georgia
G	11	Rhianna Warren	5 ft 8 in (1.73 m)	Jr	Douglasville, Georgia
F	12	Jada Young	5 ft 10 in (1.78 m)	So	Savannah, Georgia
F	14	Tanease Richardson	6 ft 2 in (1.88 m)	So	Margate, Florida
F	15	Shanikwa Buie	5 ft 10 in (1.78 m)	So	Statesboro, Georgia
G	20	Chelsea Frazier	5 ft 8 in (1.73 m)	Jr	Dillon, South Carolina
G	24	Deyja Brown	5 ft 8 in (1.73 m)	So	Ruffin, South Carolina
F	25	Destini Bush	6 ft 2 in (1.88 m)	So	Macon, Georgia
F	32	Jeremica Edwards	5 ft 10 in (1.78 m)	Jr	New Orleans, Louisiana
F	35	Charlinda Colbert	5 ft 11 in (1.8 m)	Fr	Cincinnati, Ohio
C	44	Tiyonda Davis	6 ft 4 in (1.93 m)	Jr	Athens, Georgia

Head coach

- Cedric Baker (Voorhees)

Assistant coach(es)

- Summer Dalton (Maryville (TN))
- Ronald Booker
- Brenda Warren (Voorhees)

Legend

- (C) Team captain
- (S) Suspended
- (I) Ineligible
- (W) Walk-on
- Injured
- Current redshirt

Roster
Last update: 12/8/15

== Schedule ==
Date time, TV	Rank^{#}	Opponent^{#}	Result	Record	Site (attendance) city, state
Exhibition
11/3/2015*; 6:00 pm		Armstrong State	W 68-61	0–0	Tiger Arena; Savannah, GA
Non-conference regular season
11/13/2015*; 6:00 pm		Columbia College	W 101-34	1–0	Tiger Arena (1,804); Savannah, GA
11/22/2015*; 4:00 pm		Auburn	L 40-62	1–1	Tiger Arena (2,922); Savannah, GA
11/24/2015*; 7:00 pm, SECN+		at Florida	L 34-99	1–2	O'Connell Center (1,062); Gainesville, FL
11/29/2015*; 2:00 pm, SECN+		at No. 8 Mississippi State	L 25-92	1–3	Humphrey Coliseum (3,672); Starkville, MS
12/02/2015*; 6:00 pm		Georgia Southern	L 48-64	1–4	Tiger Arena (3,160); Savannah, GA
12/05/2015*; 4:00 pm		at Alabama State	W 60-49	2–4	Dunn-Oliver Acadome (435); Montgomery, AL
12/13/2015*; 4:00 pm		at Rutgers	L 26-65	2-5	Louis Brown Athletic Center (1,645); Piscataway, NJ
12/15/2015*; 7:30 pm		at Jacksonville State	L 35-50	2-6	Pete Mathews Coliseum (410); Jacksonville, AL
12/27/2015*; 3:00 pm		at Oklahoma State	L 48-76	2-7	Gallagher-Iba Arena (2,352); Stillwater, OK
1/01/2016; 1:00 pm		at Florida A&M	L 38-59	2-8 (0-1)	Teaching Gym (237); Tallahassee, FL
1/02/2016*; 2:00 pm		at Jacksonville	L 52-65	2-9	Swisher Gymnasium (169); Jacksonville, FL
1/04/2016*; 7:00 pm		Allen University	W 72-46	3-9	Tiger Arena (223); Savannah, GA
Mid-Eastern Conference Season
1/09/2016; 4:00 pm		North Carolina A&T	L 59-69	3-10 (0-2)	Tiger Arena (920); Savannah, GA
1/11/2016; 6:00 pm		North Carolina Central	W 57-39	4-10 (1-2)	Tiger Arena (844); Savannah, GA
1/16/2016; 4:00 pm		Maryland Eastern Shore	W 60-42	5-10 (2-2)	Tiger Arena (660); Savannah, GA
1/18/2016; 6:00 pm		Delaware State	L 59-67	5-11 (2-3)	Tiger Arena (750); Savannah, GA
1/23/2016; 4:00 pm		at Hampton	L 53-65	5-12 (2-4)	Hampton Convocation Center (1,323); Hampton, VA
1/25/2016; 6:00 pm		at Norfolk State	W 68-53	6-12 (3-4)	Echols Halls (1,315); Hampton, VA
*Non-conference game. ^{#}Rankings from AP Poll. (#) Tournament seedings in parentheses. All times are in Eastern Time.
