= 2016 Ohio Valley Conference women's basketball tournament =

- Classification: Division I
- Season: 2015–16
- Teams: 8
- Site: Nashville Municipal Auditorium; Nashville, Tennessee
- Champions: Belmont (1st title)
- Winning coach: Cameron Newbauer (1st title)
- MVP: Sally McCabe (Belmont)
- Television: OVCDN/ESPN3

2015–16 Ohio Valley Conference women's basketball standings
	Conf.				Overall
Team	W		L	PCT	W		L	PCT
UT Martin	14	–	2	.875	22	–	9	.710
Belmont †	13	–	3	.813	24	–	9	.727
SIU Edwardsville	12	–	4	.750	18	–	12	.600
Eastern Kentucky	10	–	6	.625	18	–	12	.600
Southeast Missouri State	8	–	8	.500	15	–	16	.484
Austin Peay	8	–	8	.500	10	–	20	.333
Murray State	7	–	9	.438	12	–	17	.414
Tennessee State	7	–	9	.438	12	–	18	.400
Tennessee Tech	6	–	10	.375	10	–	19	.345
Jacksonville State	5	–	11	.313	10	–	18	.357
Morehead State	4	–	12	.250	10	–	20	.333
Eastern Illinois	2	–	14	.125	3	–	25	.107
† 2016 OVC tournament winner As of March 21, 2016; Rankings from AP poll

The 2016 Ohio Valley Conference women's basketball tournament was held March 2–5 at Nashville Municipal Auditorium in Nashville, Tennessee. The tournament was won by Belmont, who defeated Eastern Kentucky in the championship game.

== Format ==
The OVC tournament is an eight-team tournament with the third and fourth seeds receiving a first round bye and the two team receiving byes through to the semifinals.

== Seeds ==
Seed	School	Conference	Overall	Tiebreaker
1	Tennessee–Martin	14–2	21–8	
2	Belmont	13–3	21–8	
3	SIU Edwardsville	12–4	17–12	
4	Eastern Kentucky	10–6	16–11	
5	Austin Peay	8–8	10–19	1–1 vs. Peay
6	Southeast Missouri State	8–8	15–14	1–1 vs. SEMO
7	Tennessee State	7–9	12–17	1–0 vs. Murray
8	Murray State	7–9	11–16	0–1 vs. TSU

== Bracket ==
Quarterfinals; Wednesday, March 2 & Thursday, March 3 OVCDN/ESPN3
1	Tennessee–Martin	76
8	Murray State	78
4	Eastern Kentucky	82
5	Austin Peay	68
2	Belmont	68
7	Tennessee State	60
3	SIU Edwardsville	80^{OT}
6	Southeast Missouri State	76

Semifinals; Friday, March 4 OVDN/ESPN3
8	Murray State	52
4	Eastern Kentucky	63
2	Belmont	92
3	SIU Edwardsville	68

Championship; Saturday, March 5 OVDN/ESPN3
4	Eastern Kentucky	63
2	Belmont	95

== See also ==
- 2016 Ohio Valley Conference men's basketball tournament
