= 2016 Big South Conference women's basketball tournament =

- Classification: Division I
- Season: 2015–16
- Teams: 11
- Site: Kimmel Arena; Asheville, North Carolina
- Champions: UNC Asheville (2nd title)
- Winning coach: Brenda Mock Kirkpatrick (1st title)
- MVP: Chatori Major (UNC Asheville)
- Attendance: 7,695

2015–16 Big South women's basketball standings
	Conf.				Overall
Team	W		L	PCT	W		L	PCT
UNC Asheville †	16	–	4	.800	26	–	7	.788
Liberty	15	–	5	.750	20	–	13	.606
Gardner-Webb	13	–	7	.650	19	–	12	.613
Presbyterian	13	–	7	.650	18	–	13	.581
Radford	13	–	7	.650	18	–	13	.581
High Point	10	–	10	.500	12	–	19	.387
Charleston Southern	8	–	12	.400	14	–	17	.452
Campbell	7	–	13	.350	13	–	18	.419
Coastal Carolina	7	–	13	.350	12	–	18	.400
Longwood	5	–	15	.250	8	–	22	.267
Winthrop	3	–	17	.150	4	–	26	.133
† 2016 Big South tournament winner As of March 19, 2016; Rankings from AP poll

The 2016 Big South women's basketball tournament is a postseason women's basketball tournament for the Big South Conference that took place from March 10–13, 2015, at the Kimmel Arena in Asheville, North Carolina. All rounds after 1st were broadcast on ESPN3, 1st Round on Big South Network.

== Format ==
All 11 teams were eligible for the tournament.

== Seeds ==
Seed	School	Conference	Overall	Tiebreaker
1	UNC Asheville	16–4	23–6	
2	Liberty	15–5	18–11	
3	Radford	13–5	17–12	1–1 vs. Gardner-Webb, 2–0 vs. Presbyterian
4	Gardner-Webb	13–5	19–11	1–1 vs. Presbyterian, vs. 1–1 vs. Radford
5	Presbyterian	13–5	17–12	1–1 vs. Gardner-Webb, 0–2 vs. Radford
6	High Point	10–10	11–18	
7	Charleston Southern	8–12	13–16	
8	Campbell	7–13	13–16	2–0 vs. Coastal Carolina
9	Coastal Carolina	7–13	12–17	0–2 vs. Campbell
10	Longwood	5–15	8–21	
11	Winthrop	3–17	4–25	
‡ – Big South regular season champion. Overall records are as of the end of the regular season.

== Schedule ==
Session	Game	Time*	Matchup^{#}	Television	Attendance
First round - Thursday, March 10
1	1	2:00 pm	#8 Campbell vs. #9 Coastal Carolina	BSN	1,489
1	2	4:30 pm	#7 Charleston Southern vs. #10 Longwood	BSN	1,489
1	3	7:00 pm	#6 High Point vs. #11 Winthrop	BSN	1,489
Quarterfinals - Friday, March 11
2	4	12:00 pm	#1 UNC Asheville vs. #8 Campbell	ESPN3	1,217
2	5	2:00 pm	#4 Gardner-Webb vs. #5 Presbyterian	ESPN3	1,217
3	6	6:00 pm	#2 Liberty vs. #7 Charleston Southern	ESPN3	1,206
3	7	8:00 pm	#3 Radford vs. #6 High Point	ESPN3	1,206
Semifinals - Saturday, March 12
4	8	2:00 pm	#1 UNC Asheville vs #5 Presbyterian	ESPN3	1,891
4	9	4:00 pm	#2 Liberty vs #3 Radford	ESPN3	1,891
Championship Game - Sunday, March 13
5	10	2:00 pm	#1 UNC Asheville vs. #2 Liberty	ESPN3	1,892

*Game times in Eastern Time. #Rankings denote tournament seeding.

== Bracket ==
First round March 10, 2014
8	Campbell	67
9	Coastal Carolina	64
7	Charleston Southern	72
10	Longwood	50
6	High Point	73
11	Winthrop	55

Quarterfinals; March 11, 2014
1	UNC Asheville	70
8	Campbell	42
4	Gardner-Webb	51
5	Presbyterian	58
2	Liberty	68
7	Charleston Southern	53
3	Radford	72
6	High Point	57

Semifinals; March 12, 2014
1	UNC Asheville	65
5	Presbyterian	55
2	Liberty	51
3	Radford	41

Championship; March 13, 2014
1	UNC Asheville	64^{2OT}
2	Liberty	62

== See also ==
- 2016 Big South Conference men's basketball tournament
