= Katie Salmon =

Katie Salmon may refer to:

- Katie Salmon (basketball), played in 2015–16 Loyola Ramblers women's basketball team
- Katie Salmon (glamour model)
