= 2015–16 Evansville Purple Aces women's basketball team =

Intercollegiate basketball season

2015–16 Evansville Purple Aces women's basketball
- Conference: Missouri Valley Conference
- Record: 3–28 (1–17 The Valley)
- Head coach: Oties Epps (first 27 games, 5th year); Matt Ruffing (interim HC)
- Assistant coaches: Ashley Barlow; Doug Rogers
- Home arena: Ford Center

2015–16 Missouri Valley Conference women's basketball standings
	Conf.				Overall
Team	W		L	PCT	W		L	PCT
Northern Iowa	15	–	3	.833	24	–	11	.686
Missouri State †	14	–	4	.778	24	–	10	.706
Drake	14	–	4	.778	23	–	10	.697
Southern Illinois	12	–	6	.667	20	–	13	.606
Loyola-Chicago	10	–	8	.556	14	–	16	.467
Indiana State	9	–	9	.500	13	–	17	.433
Illinois State	6	–	12	.333	8	–	22	.267
Wichita State	5	–	13	.278	8	–	22	.267
Bradley	4	–	14	.222	9	–	22	.290
Evansville	1	–	17	.056	3	–	28	.097
† 2016 MVC tournament winner As of March 24, 2016; Rankings from AP poll

The 2015–16 Evansville Purple Aces women's basketball team represented the University of Evansville during the 2015–16 NCAA Division I men's basketball season. The Purple Aces, led by fifth year head coach Oties Epps, played their home games at the Ford Center and are members of the Missouri Valley Conference. They finished the season 3–28, 1–17 in MVC play to finish in last place. They advanced to the quarterfinals of the Missouri Valley women's tournament, where they lost to Drake.

On February 29, 2016, head coach Oties Epps resigned. He finished at Evansville with a five-year record of 44–106 and Matt Ruffing was named the interim coach for the remainder of the season and for the 2016–17 season.

== Roster ==
2015–16 Evansville Purple Aces women's basketball team
Players
Coaches

Pos.	#	Name	Height	Year	Previous school	Hometown
G	0	Camary Williams	5 ft 5 in (1.65 m)	Jr	Cape Coral; Hillsborough CC	Fort Myers, FL
F	2	Kerri Gasper	5 ft 11 in (1.8 m)	Fr	Olmstead Falls	Olmsted Township, OH
G	4	Camille Coleman	5 ft 7 in (1.7 m)	Fr	Washington	South Bend, IN
G	5	Aaliyah Gaines	5 ft 8 in (1.73 m)	RS So	Canterbury; Eastern Illinois	Fort Wayne, IN
G	10	Taloni Reese	5 ft 9 in (1.75 m)	So	John Adams	South Bend, IN
G	13	Laura Friday	5 ft 6 in (1.68 m)	Sr	Marion	Marion, IN
F	14	Peyton Langston	6 ft 0 in (1.83 m)	So	Mater Dei	Carson, CA
G	15	Kenyia Johnson	5 ft 8 in (1.73 m)	So	Fleming Island	Orange Park, FL
F	22	Sasha Robinson	6 ft 1 in (1.85 m)	Jr	Brown County	Nashville, IN
G	24	Sara Dickey	5 ft 11 in (1.8 m)	Jr	Riverton Park	Montezuma, IN
F	25	Jordan Campbell	6 ft 0 in (1.83 m)	Fr	Oswego	Montgomery, IL
F	31	Tattenai Hall	6 ft 0 in (1.83 m)	Fr	Heritage	Fort Wayne, IN
F	32	Erin Sinnott	5 ft 11 in (1.8 m)	Fr	Oswego	Fort Wayne, IL
F	33	Ashley Hawkins	6 ft 1 in (1.85 m)	Jr	Antelope; Vincennes	Sacramento, CA

Head coach

- Oties Epps (UW–Stout)

Assistant coach(es)

- Matt Ruffing (Dayton)
- Ashley Barlow (Notre Dame)
- Doug Rogers (Wisconsin)

Legend

- (C) Team captain
- (S) Suspended
- (I) Ineligible
- (W) Walk-on
- Injured
- Current redshirt

Roster

== Schedule ==
Date time, TV	Rank^{#}	Opponent^{#}	Result	Record	Site (attendance) city, state
Exhibition
11/02/2015*; 7:00 pm		Eureka	W 86–33		Ford Center (407); Evansville, IN
11/07/2015*; 12:00 pm		Berea	W 97–53		Ford Center (371); Evansville, IN
Non-conference regular season
11/14/2015*; 12:00 pm, FSOH		at Xavier; Lauren Hill Tipoff Classic	L 57–65	0–1	Cintas Center (3,122); Cincinnati, OH
11/16/2015*; 6:00 pm		at Miami (OH)	L 85–91 ^{2OT}	0–2	Millett Hall (201); Oxford, OH
11/18/2015*; 6:00 pm		at Cleveland State	W 72–63	1–2	Wolstein Center; Cleveland, OH
11/27/2015*; 7:00 pm		vs. Montana State; Cal Poly/ShareSLO Holiday Tournament	L 55–81	1–3	Mott Gym (105); San Luis Obispo, CA
11/28/2015*; 7:00 pm		vs. Santa Clara; Cal Poly/ShareSLO Holiday Tournament	L 44–62	1–4	Mott Gym (95); San Luis Obispo, CA
12/02/2015*; 5:00 pm		at Bowling Green	L 56–74	1–5	Stroh Center (1,986); Bowling Green, OH
12/05/2015*; 1:00 pm		Murray State	L 54–73	1–6	Ford Center (539); Evansville, IN
12/08/2015*; 7:00 pm		at Nebraska	L 40–85	1–7	Pinnacle Bank Arena (4,614); Lincoln, NE
12/12/2015*; 12:00 pm, ESPN3		Tennessee–Martin	L 48–75	1–8	Ford Center (432); Evansville, IN
12/21/2015*; 7:00 pm, ESPN3		Ball State	L 53–73	1–9	Ford Center (611); Evansville, IN
12/29/2015*; 7:00 pm, ESPN3		IUPUI	L 62–68	1–10	Ford Center (578); Evansville, IN
Missouri Valley regular season
01/01/2016; 7:00 pm, ESPN3		at Northern Iowa	L 51–62	1–11 (0–1)	McLeod Center (1,107); Cedar Falls, IA
01/03/2016; 4:00 pm, ESPN3		at Drake	L 52–94	1–12 (0–2)	Knapp Center (2,215); Des Moines, IA
01/08/2016; 7:00 pm, ESPN3		Loyola-Chicago	L 49–63	1–13 (0–3)	Ford Center (480); Evansville, IN
01/10/2016; 1:00 pm, ESPN3		Bradley	W 62–46	2–13 (1–3)	Ford Center (429); Evansville, IN
01/16/2016; 2:00 pm, ESPN3		at Southern Illinois	L 56–74	2–14 (1–4)	SIU Arena (729); Carbondale, IL
01/22/2016; 7:00 pm, ESPN3		at Missouri State	L 70–77	2–15 (1–5)	JQH Arena (3,287); Springfield, MO
01/24/2016; 2:00 pm, ESPN3		at Wichita State	L 50–58	2–16 (1–6)	Charles Koch Arena (1,577); Wichita, KS
01/29/2016; 7:00 pm, ESPN3		Illinois State	L 57–64	2–17 (1–7)	Ford Center (512); Evansville, IN
01/31/2016; 12:00 pm, ESPN3		Indiana State	L 44–59	2–18 (1–8)	Ford Center (738); Evansville, IN
02/05/2016; 7:00 pm, ESPN3		at Bradley	L 52–66	2–19 (1–9)	Renaissance Coliseum (471); Peoria, IL
02/07/2016; 2:00 pm, ESPN3		at Loyola-Chicago	L 54–67	2–20 (1–10)	Joseph J. Gentile Arena (469); Chicago, IL
02/14/2016; 1:00 pm, ESPN3		Southern Illinois	L 63–66	2–21 (1–11)	Ford Center (456); Evansville, IN
02/19/2016; 7:00 pm, ESPN3		Wichita State	L 31–44	2–22 (1–12)	Ford Center (507); Evansville, IN
02/21/2016; 1:00 pm, ESPN3		Missouri State	L 47–66	2–23 (1–13)	Ford Center (472); Evansville, IN
02/26/2016; 6:05 pm, ESPN3		at Indiana State	L 45–57	2–24 (1–14)	Hulman Center (1,870); Terre Haute, IN
02/28/2016; 2:05 pm, ESPN3		at Illinois State	L 59–65	2–25 (1–15)	Redbird Arena (925); Normal, IL
03/03/2016; 7:00 pm, ESPN3		Drake	L 66–86	2–26 (1–16)	Ford Center (394); Evansville, IN
03/05/2016; 1:00 pm, ESPN3		Northern Iowa	L 48–61	2–27 (1–17)	Ford Center (451); Evansville, IN
Missouri Valley Women's Tournament
03/10/2016; 8:00 pm, ESPN3		vs. Illinois State; First Round	W 61–59 ^{OT}	3–27	iWireless Center; Moline, IL
03/11/2016; 12:00 pm, ESPN3		vs. Drake; Quarterfinals	L 53–89	3–28	iWireless Center; Moline, IL
*Non-conference game. ^{#}Rankings from AP Poll. (#) Tournament seedings in parentheses. All times are in Central Time.

== See also ==
2015–16 Evansville Purple Aces men's basketball team
