= 2015–16 Missouri State Lady Bears basketball team =

Intercollegiate basketball season

2015–16 Missouri State Lady Bears basketball

Missouri Valley Tournament champions

NCAA Women's Basketball, first round
- Conference: Missouri Valley Conference
- Record: 24–10 (14–4 The Valley)
- Head coach: Kellie Harper (3rd season)
- Assistant coaches: Jon Harper; Jennifer Sullivan; Jackie Stiles
- Home arena: JQH Arena

2015–16 Missouri Valley Conference women's basketball standings
	Conf.				Overall
Team	W		L	PCT	W		L	PCT
Northern Iowa	15	–	3	.833	24	–	11	.686
Missouri State †	14	–	4	.778	24	–	10	.706
Drake	14	–	4	.778	23	–	10	.697
Southern Illinois	12	–	6	.667	20	–	13	.606
Loyola-Chicago	10	–	8	.556	14	–	16	.467
Indiana State	9	–	9	.500	13	–	17	.433
Illinois State	6	–	12	.333	8	–	22	.267
Wichita State	5	–	13	.278	8	–	22	.267
Bradley	4	–	14	.222	9	–	22	.290
Evansville	1	–	17	.056	3	–	28	.097
† 2016 MVC tournament winner As of March 24, 2016; Rankings from AP poll

The 2015–16 Missouri State Lady Bears basketball team represented Missouri State University during the 2015–16 NCAA Division I women's basketball season. The Lady Bears, led by third year head coach Kellie Harper, played their home games at JQH Arena and were members of the Missouri Valley Conference. They finished the season 24–10, 14–4 in MVC play to finish in a tie for second place. They won the Missouri Valley women's tournament to earn an automatic trip to the NCAA Women's Basketball where they lost to Texas A&M in the first round.

== Roster ==
2015–16 Missouri State Bears women's basketball team
Players
Coaches

Pos.	#	Name	Height	Year	Previous school	Hometown
G	1	Danielle Gitzen	5 ft 10 in (1.78 m)	Fr	Chanhassen High	Victoria, MN
G	2	Lexi Hughes	5 ft 7 in (1.7 m)	Jr	Bishop Miege High	Kansas City, KS
G	3	Lee Ann Polowy	5 ft 7 in (1.7 m)	So	Blair Oaks High	Jefferson City, MO
G	4	Kenzie Williams	5 ft 10 in (1.78 m)	RS Sr	Mount Vernon High	Mount Vernon, MO
G	5	Liza Fruendt	5 ft 9 in (1.75 m)	So	Batavia High	Batavia, IL
F	12	Hillary Chvatal	6 ft 2 in (1.88 m)	Sr	Rawlins County High	Atwood, KS
F	13	Audrey Holt	6 ft 1 in (1.85 m)	So	Rock Bridge High	Columbia, MO
G	15	Grace Vander Weide	5 ft 11 in (1.8 m)	Fr	Valley High	West Des Moines, IA
F	21	Aubrey Buckley	6 ft 1 in (1.85 m)	So	Parkview High	Springfield, MO
G	22	Tyonna Snow	5 ft 10 in (1.78 m)	Sr	Blue Springs High	Blue Springs, MO
G	25	Riley Rose	5 ft 8 in (1.73 m)	Fr	Harding Academy	Searcy, AR
F	34	Rachel Swartz	6 ft 3 in (1.91 m)	Jr	Stanwood High	Stanwood, WA
F	40	Onye Osemenam	6 ft 2 in (1.88 m)	Jr	Maranatha Christian Academy	Brooklyn Park, MN

Head coach

- Kellie Harper (Tennessee)

Assistant coach(es)

- Jon Harper (Auburn)
- Jennifer Sullivan (Memphis)
- Jackie Stiles (Missouri State)

Legend

- (C) Team captain
- (S) Suspended
- (I) Ineligible
- (W) Walk-on
- Injured
- Current redshirt

Roster

== Schedule ==
Date time, TV	Rank^{#}	Opponent^{#}	Result	Record	Site (attendance) city, state
Exhibition
11/02/2015*; 12:05 pm		Lyon College	W 92–45		JQH Arena (1,774); Springfield, MO
11/08/2015*; 2:05 pm		Quincy	W 73–54		JQH Arena (2,160); Springfield, MO
Non-conference regular season
11/13/2015*; 7:05 pm, ESPN3		Missouri	L 55–71	0–1	JQH Arena (4,878); Springfield, MO
11/17/2015*; 7:05 pm, ESPN3		MidAmerica Nazarene	W 88–61	1–1	JQH Arena (2,959); Springfield, MO
11/19/2015*; 6:00 pm		at Ole Miss	W 91–78	2–1	Tad Smith Coliseum (743); Oxford, MS
11/23/2015*; 7:05 pm, ESPN3		Oklahoma State	L 55–74	2–2	JQH Arena (3,206); Springfield, MO
11/27/2015*; 12:30 pm		vs. No. 13 Stanford; Gulf Coast Showcase Quarterfinals	L 65–82	2–3	Germain Arena (1,006); Estero, FL
11/28/2015*; 10:00 am		vs. Maine; Gulf Coast Showcase Consolation 2nd round	L 65–69	2–4	Germain Arena; Estero, FL
11/29/2015*; 10:00 am		vs. Marist; Gulf Coast Showcase 7th place game	W 77–45	3–4	Germain Arena; Estero, FL
12/02/2015*; 7:00 pm		at Arkansas	W 69–54	4–4	Bud Walton Arena (1,551); Fayetteville, AR
12/05/2015*; 7:05 pm, ESPN3		Eastern Kentucky	W 87–63	5–4	JQH Arena (3,084); Springfield, MO
12/12/2015*; 7:05 pm, ESPN3		Oral Roberts	W 72–64	6–4	JQH Arena (3,112); Springfield, MO
12/17/2015*; 11:00 am, KOZL		at Middle Tennessee	L 54–70	6–5	Murphy Center (11,411); Murfreesboro, TN
12/20/2015*; 3:00 pm, KOZL		at Arkansas–Little Rock	W 64–58	7–5	Jack Stephens Center (3,130); Little Rock, AR
Missouri Valley regular season
01/01/2016; 1:05 pm		at Illinois State	W 73–51	8–5 (1–0)	Redbird Arena (537); Normal, IL
01/03/2016; 1:05 pm, KOZL		at Indiana State	W 59–51	9–5 (2–0)	Hulman Center (1,675); Terre Haute, IN
01/08/2016; 7:00 pm, ESPN3		Drake	L 75–82	9–6 (2–1)	JQH Arena (3,225); Springfield, MO
01/10/2016; 2:05 pm, ESPN3		Northern Iowa	L 60–65	9–7 (2–2)	JQH Arena (2,846); Springfield, MO
01/15/2016; 7:00 pm, KOZL		at Bradley	W 55–44	10–7 (3–2)	Renaissance Coliseum (491); Peoria, IL
01/17/2016; 2:00 pm, ESPN3		at Loyola Chicago	W 73–62	11–7 (4–2)	Joseph J. Gentile Arena (412); Chicago, IL
01/22/2016; 7:00 pm, ESPN3		Evansville	W 77–70	12–7 (5–2)	JQH Arena (3,287); Springfield, MO
01/24/2016; 7:05 pm, ESPN3		Southern Illinois	W 82–77	13–7 (6–2)	JQH Arena (3,184); Springfield, MO
01/30/2016; 2:00 pm, KOZL		at Wichita State	W 77–57	14–7 (7–2)	Charles Koch Arena (1,552); Wichita, KS
02/05/2016; 7:00 pm, ESPN3		at Northern Iowa	W 78–75 ^{OT}	15–7 (8–2)	McLeod Center (1,370); Cedar Falls, IA
02/07/2016; 2:00 pm, KOZL		at Drake	L 72–95	15–8 (8–3)	Knapp Center (2,465); Des Moines, IA
02/12/2016; 7:05 pm, ESPN3		Loyola Chicago	W 91–81	16–8 (9–3)	JQH Arena (3,823); Springfield, MO
02/14/2016; 7:00 pm, ESPN3		Bradley	W 59–56	17–8 (10–3)	JQH Arena (3,427); Springfield, MO
02/19/2016; 6:00 pm, ESPN3		at Southern Illinois	L 61–69	17–9 (10–4)	SIU Arena (754); Carbondale, IL
02/21/2016; 1:00 pm, KOZL		at Evansville	W 66–47	18–9 (11–4)	Ford Center (472); Evansville, IN
02/27/2016; 2:05 pm, ESPN3		Wichita State	W 74–45	19–9 (12–4)	JQH Arena (3,539); Springfield, MO
03/03/2016; 7:05 pm, ESPN3		Indiana State	W 75–41	20–9 (13–4)	JQH Arena (3,278); Springfield, MO
03/05/2016; 2:05 pm, ESPN3		Illinois State	W 70–41	21–9 (14–4)	JQH Arena (3,748); Springfield, MO
Missouri Valley Women's Tournament
03/11/2016; 8:30 pm, ESPN3		vs. Indiana State; Quarterfinals	W 70–45	22–9	iWireless Center (1,525); Moline, IL
03/12/2016; 4:30 pm, ESPN3		vs. Drake; Semifinals	W 65–61	23–9	iWireless Center (2,241); Moline, IL
03/13/2016; 2:00 pm, ESPN3		vs. Northern Iowa; Championship Game	W 71–58	24–9	iWireless Center (1,842); Moline, IL
NCAA Women's Tournament
03/19/2016*; 3:00 pm, ESPN2	(13 D)	at (4 D) No. 18 Texas A&M; First Round	L 65–74	24–10	Reed Arena (4,040); College Station, TX
*Non-conference game. ^{#}Rankings from AP Poll. (#) Tournament seedings in parentheses. D=Dallas Region. All times are in Central Time.

== See also ==
2015–16 Missouri State Bears basketball team
