= 2015–16 Bradley Braves women's basketball team =

Intercollegiate basketball season

2015–16 Bradley Braves women's basketball
- Conference: Missouri Valley Conference
- Record: 9–22 (4–14 The Valley)
- Head coach: Michael Brooks (4th season)
- Assistant coaches: Lindsay Schultz; Lindsay Weiss; Skyler Young
- Home arena: Renaissance Coliseum

2015–16 Missouri Valley Conference women's basketball standings
	Conf.				Overall
Team	W		L	PCT	W		L	PCT
Northern Iowa	15	–	3	.833	24	–	11	.686
Missouri State †	14	–	4	.778	24	–	10	.706
Drake	14	–	4	.778	23	–	10	.697
Southern Illinois	12	–	6	.667	20	–	13	.606
Loyola-Chicago	10	–	8	.556	14	–	16	.467
Indiana State	9	–	9	.500	13	–	17	.433
Illinois State	6	–	12	.333	8	–	22	.267
Wichita State	5	–	13	.278	8	–	22	.267
Bradley	4	–	14	.222	9	–	22	.290
Evansville	1	–	17	.056	3	–	28	.097
† 2016 MVC tournament winner As of March 24, 2016; Rankings from AP poll

The 2015–16 Bradley Braves women's basketball team represented Bradley University during the 2015–16 NCAA Division I women's basketball season. The Braves were led by fourth year head coach Michael Brooks. The Braves were members of the Missouri Valley Conference and played their home games at Renaissance Coliseum. They finished the season 9–22, 4–14 in MVC play to finish in ninth place. They advanced to the quarterfinals of the Missouri Valley women's tournament, where they lost to Northern Iowa.

On March 14, Michael Brooks was fired. He finished at Bradley with a four year record 37–84.

== Roster ==
2015–16 Bradley Braves women's basketball team
Players
Coaches

Pos.	#	Name	Height	Year	Previous school	Hometown
F	00	Danielle Brewer	5 ft 10 in (1.78 m)	So	Home schooled	Coatsville, IN
G	2	Daija Hurks	5 ft 6 in (1.68 m)	Fr	Bolingbrook	Bolingbrook, IL
F	3	Briana Gray (I) (redshirt)	5 ft 10 in (1.78 m)	Jr	Nicolet; Saint Louis	Milwaukee, WI
G	10	Gabby Green	5 ft 6 in (1.68 m)	Fr	Pius XI	Milwaukee, WI
F	11	Tamya Sims	6 ft 2 in (1.88 m)	So	Oak Creek	Milwaukee, WI
G	12	Kellee Clay	5 ft 6 in (1.68 m)	Fr	Metea Valley	Naperville, IL
G	14	Kat Yelle	5 ft 7 in (1.7 m)	RS Sr	Geneva; Ohio	Geneva, IL
G	15	Emily Eshoo	5 ft 9 in (1.75 m)	Fr	Benet Academy	Naperville, IL
G	20	Shareece Burrell	5 ft 8 in (1.73 m)	So	East	Des Moines, IA
C	21	Haley Van Cleave	6 ft 3 in (1.91 m)	So	Hemptead	Dubuque, IA
G	23	Leti Lerma	5 ft 10 in (1.78 m)	Jr	Muscatine	Muscatine, IA
G	24	Sameia Kendall	5 ft 8 in (1.73 m)	Sr	Raytown; Johnson County	Kansas City, MO
G	30	Whitney Tinjum	6 ft 1 in (1.85 m)	RS Jr	Chisago Lakes; Washington State	Stacy, MN
G	32	Madison Dellamuth	5 ft 6 in (1.68 m)	So	Prairie	Cedar Rapids, IA
G	33	Anneke Schlueter	6 ft 0 in (1.83 m)	So	Max-Weber-Schule	Ulm, Germany
F	44	Vanessa Markert	6 ft 2 in (1.88 m)	Fr	Brown County	Mount Sterling, IL

Head coach

- Michael Brooks (Western Colorado)

Assistant coach(es)

- Lindsay Schultz (Cardinal Stritch)
- Lindsay Weiss (Central Washington)
- Skyler Young (Western Michigan)

Legend

- (C) Team captain
- (S) Suspended
- (I) Ineligible
- (W) Walk-on
- Injured
- Current redshirt

Roster

== Schedule ==
Date time, TV	Rank^{#}	Opponent^{#}	Result	Record	Site (attendance) city, state
Exhibition
11/01/2015*; 2:00 pm		McKendree	W 52–38		Renaissance Coliseum; Peoria, IL
11/07/2015*; 2:00 pm		Missouri–Saint Louis	W 78–65		Renaissance Coliseum (512); Peoria, IL
Non-conference regular season
11/13/2015*; 6:00 pm, ESPN3		at Detroit	W 75–67	1–0	Calihan Hall (255); Detroit, MI
11/15/2015*; 1:00 pm, ESPN3		at Bowling Green	L 53–66	1–1	Stroh Center (1,506); Bowling Green, OH
11/22/2015*; 2:00 pm, ESPN3		No. 17 Oklahoma	L 46–79	1–2	Renaissance Coliseum (778); Peoria, IL
11/24/2015*; 11:00 am, ESPN3		Western Michigan	L 59–72	1–3	Renaissance Coliseum (1,504); Peoria, IL
11/28/2015*; 7:00 pm, ESPN3		Eureka	W 87–47	2–3	Renaissance Coliseum (609); Peoria, IL
12/02/2015*; 7:00 pm		at Chicago State	W 66–60	3–3	Emil and Patricia Jones Convocation Center (225); Chicago, IL
12/05/2015*; 1:00 pm, ESPN3		UIC	L 56–66	3–4	Renaissance Coliseum (521); Peoria, IL
12/08/2015*; 7:00 pm, ESPN3		Kent State	W 68–60	4–4	Renaissance Coliseum (412); Peoria, IL
12/19/2015*; 5:00 pm		at Iowa	L 53–60	4–5	Carver–Hawkeye Arena (4,051); Iowa City, IA
12/21/2015*; 7:00 pm		at Northern Illinois	L 64–68	4–6	Convocation Center (409); DeKalb, IL
12/30/2015*; 7:00 pm		at Saint Louis	L 58–75	4–7	Chaifetz Arena (1,513); St. Louis, MO
Missouri Valley Conference regular season
01/03/2016; 6:00 pm, ESPN3		Loyola-Chicago	L 54–67	4–8 (0–1)	Renaissance Coliseum (572); Peoria, IL
01/08/2016; 6:00 pm, ESPN3		at Southern Illinois	L 49–75	4–9 (0–2)	SIU Arena (593); Carbondale, IL
01/10/2016; 6:00 pm, ESPN3		at Evansville	L 46–62	4–10 (0–3)	Ford Center (429); Evansville, IN
01/15/2016; 7:00 pm, ESPN3		Missouri State	L 44–55	4–11 (0–4)	Renaissance Coliseum (491); Peoria, IL
01/17/2016; 2:00 pm, ESPN3		Wichita State	W 50–44	5–11 (1–4)	Renaissance Coliseum (768); Peoria, IL
01/22/2016; 7:00 pm, ESPN3		at Illinois State	L 49–54	5–12 (1–5)	Redbird Arena (1,142); Normal, IL
01/24/2016; 11:00 am, ESPN3		at Indiana State	L 37–59	5–13 (1–6)	Hulman Center (1,650); Terre Haute, IN
01/29/2016; 7:00 pm, ESPN3		Drake	L 64–76	5–14 (1–7)	Renaissance Coliseum (591); Peoria, IL
01/31/2016; 2:00 pm, ESPN3		Northern Iowa	L 47–55	5–15 (1–8)	Renaissance Coliseum (1,015); Peoria, IL
02/05/2016; 7:00 pm, ESPN3		Evansville	W 66–52	6–15 (2–8)	Renaissance Coliseum (471); Peoria, IL
02/07/2016; 2:00 pm, ESPN3		Southern Illinois	L 51–65	6–16 (2–9)	Renaissance Coliseum (676); Peoria, IL
02/12/2016; 7:00 pm, ESPN3		at Wichita State	W 55–50	7–16 (3–9)	Charles Koch Arena (1,373); Wichita, KS
02/14/2016; 2:00 pm, ESPN3		at Missouri State	L 56–59	7–17 (3–10)	JQH Arena (3,427); Springfield, MO
02/19/2016; 7:00 pm, ESPN3		Indiana State	L 59–68	7–18 (3–11)	Renaissance Coliseum (698); Peoria, IL
02/21/2016; 7:00 pm, ESPN3		Illinois State	W 52–38	8–18 (4–11)	Renaissance Coliseum (717); Peoria, IL
02/26/2016; 7:00 pm, ESPN3		at Northern Iowa	L 41–65	8–19 (4–12)	McLeod Center (1,505); Cedar Falls, IA
02/28/2016; 2:00 pm, ESPN3		at Drake	L 45–78	8–20 (4–13)	Knapp Center (2,433); Des Moines, IA
03/05/2016; 6:00 pm, ESPN3		at Loyola-Chicago	L 63–69	8–21 (4–14)	Joseph J. Gentile Arena; Chicago, IL
Missouri Valley Women's Tournament
03/10/2016; 4:00 pm, ESPN3		vs. Wichita State; First Round	W 56–51	9–21	iWireless Center; Moline, IL
03/11/2016; 4:00 pm, ESPN3		vs. Northern Iowa; Quarterfinals	L 45–46	9–22	iWireless Center; Moline, IL
*Non-conference game. ^{#}Rankings from AP Poll. (#) Tournament seedings in parentheses. All times are in Central Time.

== See also ==
2015–16 Bradley Braves men's basketball team
