= 2015–16 Indiana State Sycamores women's basketball team =

Intercollegiate basketball season

2015–16 Indiana State Sycamores women's basketball
- Conference: Missouri Valley Conference
- Record: 13–17 (9–9 The Valley)
- Head coach: Joey Wells (6th season)
- Assistant coaches: Janet Eaton; Josh Keister; Sara Riedeman
- Home arena: Hulman Center

2015–16 Missouri Valley Conference women's basketball standings
	Conf.				Overall
Team	W		L	PCT	W		L	PCT
Northern Iowa	15	–	3	.833	24	–	11	.686
Missouri State †	14	–	4	.778	24	–	10	.706
Drake	14	–	4	.778	23	–	10	.697
Southern Illinois	12	–	6	.667	20	–	13	.606
Loyola-Chicago	10	–	8	.556	14	–	16	.467
Indiana State	9	–	9	.500	13	–	17	.433
Illinois State	6	–	12	.333	8	–	22	.267
Wichita State	5	–	13	.278	8	–	22	.267
Bradley	4	–	14	.222	9	–	22	.290
Evansville	1	–	17	.056	3	–	28	.097
† 2016 MVC tournament winner As of March 24, 2016; Rankings from AP poll

The 2015–16 Indiana State Sycamores women's basketball team represented Indiana State University during the 2015–16 NCAA Division I women's basketball season. The Sycamores, led by sixth year head coach Joey Wells, played their home games at the Hulman Center and were members of the Missouri Valley Conference. They finished the season 13–17, 9–9 in MVC play to finish in sixth place. They lost in the quarterfinals of the Missouri Valley women's tournament to Missouri State.

== Roster ==
2015–16 Indiana State Sycamores women's basketball team
Players
Coaches

Pos.	#	Name	Height	Year	Previous school	Hometown
F	1	Ashley Taia	6 ft 0 in (1.83 m)	RS So	St. John Paul; Odessa College	Brisbane, Australia
G	2	Freja Christensen	5 ft 10 in (1.78 m)	So	Falkonergardens Gymnasium	Copenhagen, Denmark
G	3	Alexis Newbolt	5 ft 6 in (1.68 m)	Sr	Sycamore; Moberly Area CC	Cincinnati, OH
G	4	Cierra Ceazer	5 ft 10 in (1.78 m)	RS Sr	Shawnee Heights; Grambling State	Topeka, KS
G	10	Jessica Mackowiak	5 ft 8 in (1.73 m)	Fr	Fenwick	Chicago, IL
G	10	Jennifer Mackowiak	5 ft 8 in (1.73 m)	Fr	Fenwick	Chicago, IL
G/F	13	Joyea Marshall	6 ft 0 in (1.83 m)	RS Jr	Wichita Heights; Texas–Pan American	Wichita, KS
G	14	Tierra Webb	5 ft 7 in (1.7 m)	Fr	Rich South	Richton Park, IL
G	18	Alicia Bell	4 ft 11 in (1.5 m)	Fr	XXXX	Terre Haute, IN
G	20	Kalliste Haskins	5 ft 7 in (1.7 m)	Sr	Warren Central	Indianapolis, IN
G	21	Brooklyn Artis	5 ft 8 in (1.73 m)	RS So	Caprock; Seward County CC	Amarillo, TX
G	23	Kiera Brooks	5 ft 7 in (1.7 m)	Fr	North Lawndale Prep	Chicago, IL
F	30	Regan Wentland	6 ft 1 in (1.85 m)	Fr	Center Grove	Greenwood, IN
G	33	Marian Sheikh	5 ft 11 in (1.8 m)	So	Falkonergardens Gymnasium	Copenhagen, Denmark
F	35	Kelsey Dirks	6 ft 3 in (1.91 m)	RS Jr	Robinson; Murray State	Robinson, IL
F	45	Rhagen Smith	6 ft 2 in (1.88 m)	Jr	Sullivan	Sullivan, IN

Head coach

- Joey Wells (Fresno Pacific)

Assistant coach(es)

- Janet Eaton (Dillard)
- Josh Keister (Mount Mercy)
- Sara Riedeman (Indianapolis)

Legend

- (C) Team captain
- (S) Suspended
- (I) Ineligible
- (W) Walk-on
- Injured
- Current redshirt

Roster

== Schedule ==
Date time, TV	Rank^{#}	Opponent^{#}	Result	Record	Site (attendance) city, state
Exhibition
11/06/2015*; 7:05 pm		Indianapolis	W 74–44		Hulman Center; Terre Haute, IN
Non-conference regular season
11/13/2015*; 7:30 pm, ESPN3		at Central Michigan	L 65–85	0–1	McGuirk Arena (1,373); Mount Pleasant, MI
11/15/2015*; 1:00 pm, ESPN3		at Northern Kentucky	L 67–73	0–2	BB&T Arena (1,172); Highland Heights, KY
11/19/2015*; 7:05 pm, ESPN3		Eastern Illinois	W 60–42	1–2	Hulman Center (1,898); Terre Haute, IN
11/21/2015*; 7:05 pm, ESPN3		Nebraska–Omaha	L 50–51	1–3	Hulman Center (1,772); Terre Haute, IN
11/25/2015*; 6:05 pm, ESPN3		Saint Louis	L 52–62	1–4	Hulman Center (1,493); Terre Haute, IN
11/27/2015*; 2:00 pm		at UMKC; Plaza Lights Classic	W 77–47	2–4	Swinney Recreation Center (296); Kansas City, MO
11/28/2015*; 2:00 pm		vs. Stephen F. Austin; Plaza Lights Classic	L 62–71	2–5	Swinney Recreation Center (164); Kansas City, MO
12/01/2015*; 7:00 pm, ESPN3		at IUPUI	L 43–68	2–6	The Jungle (388); Indianapolis, IN
12/06/2015*; 2:00 pm		at Tulsa	W 67–63	3–6	Reynolds Center (351); Tulsa, OK
12/08/2015*; 7:05 pm, ESPN3		Indiana	L 50–53	3–7	Hulman Center (2,340); Terre Haute, IN
12/21/2015*; 6:05 pm, ESPN3		Butler	W 70–63 ^{OT}	4–7	Hulman Center (1,765); Terre Haute, IN
Missouri Valley Conference regular season
01/01/2016; 7:05 pm, ESPN3		Wichita State	W 59–33	5–7 (1–0)	Hulman Center (1,621); Terre Haute, IN
01/03/2016; 2:05 pm, ESPN3		Missouri State	L 51–59	5–8 (1–1)	Hulman Center (1,675); Terre Haute, IN
01/10/2016; 2:05 pm, ESPN3		Illinois State	W 63–58	6–8 (2–1)	Hulman Center (1,786); Terre Haute, IN
01/15/2016; 8:00 pm, ESPN3		at Drake	L 55–80	6–9 (2–2)	Knapp Center (2,153); Des Moines, IA
01/17/2016; 3:00 pm, ESPN3		at Northern Iowa	L 42–53	6–10 (2–3)	McLeod Center (1,278); Cedar Falls, IA
01/22/2016; 7:05 pm, ESPN3		Loyola-Chicago	W 62–48	7–10 (3–3)	Hulman Center (1,735); Terre Haute, IN
01/24/2016; 12:05 pm, ESPN3		Bradley	W 59–37	8–10 (4–3)	Hulman Center (1,650); Terre Haute, IN
01/29/2016; 7:00 pm, ESPN3		at Southern Illinois	L 64–76	8–11 (4–4)	SIU Arena (619); Carbondale, IL
01/31/2016; 12:00 pm, ESPN3		at Evansville	W 59–44	9–11 (5–4)	Ford Center (738); Evansville, IN
02/05/2016; 8:05 pm, ESPN3		at Illinois State	L 62–73	9–12 (5–5)	Redbird Arena (1,240); Normal, IL
02/12/2016; 7:05 pm, ESPN3		Northern Iowa	L 45–61	9–13 (5–6)	Hulman Center (1,381); Terre Haute, IN
02/14/2016; 2:05 pm, ESPN3		Drake	W 68–53	10–13 (6–6)	Hulman Center (1,861); Terre Haute, IN
02/19/2016; 8:05 pm, ESPN3		Bradley	W 68–59	11–13 (7–6)	Renaissance Coliseum (698); Peoria, IL
02/21/2016; 3:00 pm, ESPN3		at Loyola-Chicago	W 74–71	12–13 (8–6)	Joseph J. Gentile Arena (373); Chicago, IL
02/26/2016; 7:05 pm, ESPN3		Evansville	W 57–45	13–13 (9–6)	Hulman Center (1,870); Terre Haute, IN
02/28/2016; 2:05 pm, ESPN3		Southern Illinois	L 58–62	13–14 (9–7)	Hulman Center (1,895); Terre Haute, IN
03/03/2016; 8:05 pm, ESPN3		at Missouri State	L 41–75	13–15 (9–8)	JQH Arena (3,278); Springfield, MO
03/05/2016; 7:05 pm, ESPN3		at Wichita State	L 53–54	13–16 (9–9)	Charles Koch Arena (1,627); Wichita, KS
Missouri Valley Women's Tournament
03/11/2016; 8:30 pm, ESPN3		vs. Missouri State; Quarterfinals	L 45–70	13–17	iWireless Center (1,525); Moline, IL
*Non-conference game. ^{#}Rankings from AP Poll. (#) Tournament seedings in parentheses. All times are in Eastern Time.

== See also ==
2015–16 Indiana State Sycamores men's basketball team
