= 2014–15 Wichita State Shockers women's basketball team =

Intercollegiate basketball season

2014–15 Wichita State Shockers women's basketball

MVC tournament & regular season champions

NCAA tournament, First round
- Conference: Missouri Valley Conference
- Record: 29–5 (17–1 MVC)
- Head coach: Jody Adams (7th season)
- Assistant coaches: Kirk Crawford; Bridgette Gordon; Chandra Dorsey
- Home arena: Charles Koch Arena (10,506)

2014–15 Missouri Valley Conference women's basketball standings
	Conf.				Overall
Team	W		L	PCT	W		L	PCT
Wichita State	17	–	1	.944	28	–	4	.875
Drake	15	–	3	.833	20	–	10	.667
Missouri State	13	–	5	.722	17	–	13	.567
Northern Iowa	12	–	6	.667	17	–	14	.548
Southern Illinois	10	–	8	.556	17	–	13	.567
Indiana State	7	–	11	.389	17	–	13	.567
Evansville	6	–	12	.333	13	–	18	.419
Bradley	5	–	13	.278	6	–	24	.200
Loyola-Chicago	3	–	15	.167	6	–	25	.194
Illinois State	2	–	16	.111	2	–	28	.067
† 2015 MVC tournament winner As of 14 March 2015; Rankings from AP poll

The 2014–15 Wichita State Shockers women's basketball team represented Wichita State University in the 2014–15 NCAA Division I women's basketball season. They played their home games at Charles Koch Arena, which has a capacity of 10,506. The Shockers, led by seventh year head coach Jody Adams, were members of the Missouri Valley Conference. They finished the season 29–5, 17–1 in MVC play to win the Missouri Valley Conference regular season title. They also won the Missouri Valley Conference Women's tournament to earn an automatic trip to the 2015 NCAA Division I women's basketball tournament, where they lost to California in the first round.

== Roster ==
2014–15 Wichita State Shockers women's basketball team
Players
Coaches

Pos.	#	Name	Height	Year	Hometown
G	3	Aundra Stovall	5 ft 2 in (1.57 m)	Fr	Seguin HS	Arlington, TX
G	4	Diamond Lockhart	5 ft 5 in (1.65 m)	So	Red Oak HS	Red Oak, TX
G	5	Jamillah Bonner	5 ft 8 in (1.73 m)	Sr	Southeast HS; Butler CC	Wichita, KS
G	12	Kayla White	5 ft 8 in (1.73 m)	So	East Central HS	San Antonio, TX
F	13	Kelsey Jacobs	6 ft 2 in (1.88 m)	RS Sr	Fortuna HS	Fortuna, CA
C	20	Brittany Martin	6 ft 3 in (1.91 m)	So	Bishop Ford HS; NW Florida State	Queens Village, NY
F	21	Alie Decker	5 ft 10 in (1.78 m)	RS So	Edmond Memorial HS	Edmond, OK
G/F	24	Alex Harden	5 ft 11 in (1.8 m)	Sr	Southeast HS	Springfield, IL
G	25	Jaleesa Chapel	5 ft 9 in (1.75 m)	So	Dekaney HS	Spring, TX
F	35	Rangie Bessard	6 ft 0 in (1.83 m)	Fr	Manvel HS	Rosharon, TX
G/F	43	Moriah Dapprich	6 ft 0 in (1.83 m)	So	Branson HS	Branson, MO
G/F	44	Michaela Dapprich	5 ft 10 in (1.78 m)	Jr	Branson HS	Branson, MO

Head coach

- Jody Adams (Tennessee)

Assistant coach(es)

- Kirk Crawford (Western State)
- Bridgette Gordon (Tennessee)
- Chandra Dorsey (Mississippi)

Legend

- (C) Team captain
- (S) Suspended
- (I) Ineligible
- (W) Walk-on
- Injured
- Current redshirt

Roster

== Schedule ==
Date time, TV	Rank^{#}	Opponent^{#}	Result	Record	Site (attendance) city, state
Exhibition
11/02/2014*; 2:05 pm		Newman	W 81–32	–	Charles Koch Arena (1,727); Wichita, KS
Regular Season
11/15/2014*; 2:05 pm, Cox Kansas		Creighton	W 65–56	1–0	Charles Koch Arena (2,156); Wichita, KS
11/18/2014*; 8:00 pm		at Eastern Washington	L 58–86	1–1	Reese Court (653); Cheney, WA
11/22/2014*; 2:05 pm		Texas–Arlington	W 71–61	2–1	Charles Koch Arena (1,549); Wichita, KS
11/27/2014*; 2:30 pm		vs. Florida Gulf Coast; Paradise Jam tournament	L 39–56	2–2	Sports and Fitness Center (525); Saint Thomas, USVI
11/28/2014*; 12:15 pm		vs. Ohio State; Paradise Jam Tournament	W 70–50	3–2	Sports and Fitness Center (238); Saint Thomas, USVI
11/29/2014*; 12:15 pm		vs. Clemson; Paradise Jam Tournament	W 63–48	4–2	Sports and Fitness Center (N/A); Saint Thomas, USVI
12/05/2014*; 12:05 pm		Arkansas–Pine Bluff	W 55–26	5–2	Charles Koch Arena (10,087); Wichita, KS
12/12/2014*; 7:05 pm, Cox Kansas		Kansas State	W 51–48	6–2	Charles Koch Arena (3,536); Wichita, KS
12/16/2014*; 6:00 pm, SECN		at No. 11 Tennessee	L 51–54	6–3	Thompson–Boling Arena (9,026); Knoxville, TN
12/19/2014*; 7:05 pm		Louisiana–Monroe; Shocker Winter Classic	W 57–42	7–3	Charles Koch Arena (1,467); Wichita, KS
12/20/2014*; 3:05 pm		Winthrop; Shocker Winter Classic	W 66–20	8–3	Charles Koch Arena (1,579); Wichita, KS
12/28/2014*; 2:05 pm		Sam Houston State	W 70–46	9–3	Charles Koch Arena (1,608); Wichita, KS
01/02/2015; 7:00 pm, ESPN3		Indiana State	W 63–52	10–3 (1–0)	Charles Koch Arena (1,882); Wichita, KS
01/04/2015; 12:00 pm		Evansville	W 54–44	11–3 (2–0)	Charles Koch Arena (1,651); Wichita, KS
01/09/2015; 7:05 pm, ESPN3		at Missouri State	W 71–59	12–3 (3–0)	JQH Arena (3,067); Springfield, MO
01/16/2015; 7:05 pm		at Bradley	W 61–45	13–3 (4–0)	Renaissance Coliseum (654); Peoria, IL
01/18/2015; 2:05 pm		at Loyola–Chicago	W 65–41	14–3 (5–0)	Joseph J. Gentile Arena (337); Chicago, IL
01/23/2015; 7:00 pm		Illinois State	W 85–38	15–3 (6–0)	Charles Koch Arena (2,125); Wichita, KS
01/25/2015; 3:45 pm		Southern Illinois	W 80–61	16–3 (7–0)	Charles Koch Arena (2,782); Wichita, KS
01/30/2015; 1:00 pm, Cox Kansas		at Northern Iowa	W 70–52	17–3 (8–0)	McLeod Center (N/A); Cedar Falls, IA
02/01/2015; 7:00 pm		at Drake	L 61–64	17–4 (8–1)	Knapp Center (2,183); Des Moines, IA
02/08/2015; 2:00 pm		Missouri State	W 69–50	18–4 (9–1)	Charles Koch Arena (1,814); Wichita, KS
02/13/2015; 7:00 pm		Loyola–Chicago	W 64–55	19–4 (10–1)	Charles Koch Arena (2,322); Wichita, KS
02/15/2015; 2:00 pm		Bradley	W 66–36	20–4 (11–1)	Charles Koch Arena (1,877); Wichita, KS
02/20/2015; 7:05 pm		at Illinois State	W 46–41	21–4 (12–1)	Redbird Arena (811); Normal, IL
02/22/2015; 2:05 pm		at Southern Illinois	W 69–61	22–4 (13–1)	SIU Arena (680); Carbondale, IL
02/27/2015; 7:07 pm, ESPN3		Drake	W 80–59	23–4 (14–1)	Charles Koch Arena (2,263); Wichita, KS
03/01/2015; 7:00 pm		Northern Iowa	W 66–54	24–4 (15–1)	Charles Koch Arena (2,183); Wichita, KS
03/05/2015; 7:00 pm		at Evansville	W 77–63	25–4 (16–1)	Ford Center (704); Evansville, IN
03/07/2015; 1:05 pm		at Indiana State	W 62–54	26–4 (17–1)	Hulman Center (1,756); Terre Haute, IN
Missouri Valley Tournament
03/13/2015; 12:00 pm, ESPN3		vs. Loyola–Chicago; Quarterfinals	W 59–42	27–4	Family Arena (N/A); St. Charles, MO
03/14/2015; 1:30 pm, ESPN3		vs. Northern Iowa; Semifinals	W 56–42	28–4	Family Arena (N/A); St. Charles, MO
03/15/2015; 2:00 pm, ESPN3		vs. Missouri State; Championship Game	W 85–71	29–4	Family Arena (1,382); St. Charles, MO
NCAA Women's tournament
03/20/2015*; 6:30 pm, ESPN2		at California; First Round	L 66–78	29–5	Haas Pavilion (2,079); Berkeley, CA
*Non-conference game. ^{#}Rankings from AP Poll. (#) Tournament seedings in parentheses. All times are in Central Time.

== Rankings ==
+ Regular season polls	Poll	Pre- Season	Week 2	Week 3	Week 4	Week 5	Week 6	Week 7	Week 8	Week 9	Week 10	Week 11	Week 12	Week 13	Week 14	Week 15	Week 16	Week 17	Week 18	Final
AP	NR	NR	NR	NR	NR	NR	NR	NR	NR	NR	NR	NR	NR	NR	RV	RV	RV	RV	RV	
Coaches	NR	NR	NR	NR	NR	NR	NR	NR	NR	NR	NR	NR	NR	NR	NR	NR	NR	NR	NR	

Legend
	Increase in ranking
	Decrease in ranking
	No change
(RV)	Received votes

== See also ==
2014–15 Wichita State Shockers men's basketball team
