= 2015–16 Illinois State Redbirds women's basketball team =

Intercollegiate basketball season

2015–16 Illinois State Redbirds women's basketball
- Conference: Missouri Valley Conference
- Record: 8–22 (6–12 The Valley)
- Head coach: Barb Smith (3rd season)
- Assistant coaches: Lisa Hayden; Cathy Boswell; Jessica Grayson
- Home arena: Redbird Arena

2015–16 Missouri Valley Conference women's basketball standings
	Conf.				Overall
Team	W		L	PCT	W		L	PCT
Northern Iowa	15	–	3	.833	24	–	11	.686
Missouri State †	14	–	4	.778	24	–	10	.706
Drake	14	–	4	.778	23	–	10	.697
Southern Illinois	12	–	6	.667	20	–	13	.606
Loyola-Chicago	10	–	8	.556	14	–	16	.467
Indiana State	9	–	9	.500	13	–	17	.433
Illinois State	6	–	12	.333	8	–	22	.267
Wichita State	5	–	13	.278	8	–	22	.267
Bradley	4	–	14	.222	9	–	22	.290
Evansville	1	–	17	.056	3	–	28	.097
† 2016 MVC tournament winner As of March 24, 2016; Rankings from AP poll

The 2015–16 Illinois State Redbirds women's basketball team represented Illinois State University during the 2015–16 NCAA Division I women's basketball season. The Redbirds, led by third year head coach Barb Smith, played their home games at Redbird Arena and were members of the Missouri Valley Conference. They finished the season 8–22, 6–12 in MVC play to finish in seventh place. They lost in the first round of the Missouri Valley women's tournament to Evansville.

== Roster ==
2015–16 Illinois State Redbirds women's basketball team
Players
Coaches

Pos.	#	Name	Height	Year	Previous school	Hometown
F	1	Colleene Smith	6 ft 0 in (1.83 m)	Sr	Cape Coral; ASA College	New Haven, CT
F	3	Octavia Crump	5 ft 10 in (1.78 m)	Sr	Zion-Benton	Zion, IL
G	5	Brechelle Beachum	5 ft 7 in (1.7 m)	Jr	Western Texas College	Mexia, TX
G	11	Morgan Radtke	5 ft 10 in (1.78 m)	So	Palatine	Palatine, IL
F	12	Millie Stevens	6 ft 0 in (1.83 m)	Fr	Sevenoaks Suns (WBBL team)	Surrey, England
G	13	Katrina Beck	5 ft 9 in (1.75 m)	Fr	Whitney Young	Chicago, IL
G	14	Lexie Taylor	5 ft 5 in (1.65 m)	Sr	Normal West	Normal, IL
G	22	Shakeela Fowler	5 ft 3 in (1.6 m)	Fr	Milwaukee King	Milwaukee, WI
G	23	Viria Livingston	5 ft 8 in (1.73 m)	Fr	Hopkins	Minnetonka, MN
G	32	Taylor Stewart	5 ft 7 in (1.7 m)	Jr	Lakeville North	Lakeville, MN
C	34	Kalyn Gebhardt	6 ft 4 in (1.93 m)	Jr	Beaver Dam	Beaver Dam, WI

Head coach

Barb Smith (Ohio State)

Assistant coach(es)

Lisa Hayden (Miami (OH))
Cathy Boswell (Illinois State)
Jessica Grayson (Valdosta State)

Legend

- (C) Team captain
- (S) Suspended
- (I) Ineligible
- (W) Walk-on
- Injured
- Current redshirt

Roster

== Schedule ==
Date time, TV	Rank^{#}	Opponent^{#}	Result	Record	Site (attendance) city, state
Exhibition
11/04/2015*; 7:00 pm		Lindenwood	W 71–70		Redbird Arena (637); Normal, IL
Non-conference regular season
11/13/2015*; 6:00 pm		at Bowling Green	L 52–70	0–1	Stroh Center (1,469); Bowling Green, OH
11/18/2015*; 7:00 pm, ESPN3		Murray State	W 81–76	1–1	Redbird Arena (707); Normal, IL
11/23/2015*; 7:00 pm, ESPN3		UIC	L 65–74	1–2	Redbird Arena (534); Normal, IL
11/27/2015*; 4:00 pm		at UTSA; UTSA Thanksgiving Classic	L 51–77	1–3	Convocation Center (234); San Antonio, TX
11/29/2015*; 12:00 pm		vs. Nebraska–Omaha; UTSA Thanksgiving Classic	L 56–60	1–4	Convocation Center (159); San Antonio, TX
12/01/2015*; 7:00 pm, ESPN3		SIU Edwardsville	L 57–65	1–5	Redbird Arena (564); Normal, IL
12/05/2015*; 7:00 pm		at No. 23 DePaul	L 41–89	1–6	Phillips-McGrath Arena (2,422); Chicago, IL
12/13/2015*; 3:30 pm, ESPN3		vs. Northern Illinois; MVC vs. MAC Basketball Challenge	L 59–68	1–7	iWireless Center (634); Moline, IL
12/16/2015*; 6:00 pm		at Yale	L 47–60	1–8	John J. Lee Amphitheater (129); New Haven, CT
12/21/2015*; 7:00 pm, ESPN3		Chicago State	W 57–53	2–8	Redbird Arena (734); Normal, IL
12/28/2015*; 7:00 pm, ESPN3		Western Illinois	L 64–79	2–9	Redbird Arena (539); Normal, IL
Missouri Valley regular season
01/01/2016; 1:00 pm, ESPN3		Missouri State	L 51–73	2–10 (0–1)	Redbird Arena (537); Normal, IL
01/03/2016; 2:00 pm, ESPN3		Wichita State	W 70–49	3–10 (1–1)	Redbird Arena (602); Normal, IL
01/10/2016; 1:00 pm, ESPN3		at Indiana State	L 58–63	3–11 (1–2)	Hulman Center (1,786); Terre Haute, IN
01/15/2016; 7:00 pm		at Northern Iowa	L 51–65	3–12 (1–3)	McLeod Center (1,207); Cedar Falls, IA
01/17/2016; 6:00 pm		at Drake	L 41–76	3–13 (1–4)	Knapp Center (2,413); Des Moines, IA
01/22/2016; 7:00 pm, ESPN3		Bradley	W 54–49	4–13 (2–4)	Redbird Arena (1,142); Normal, IL
01/24/2016; 7:00 pm, ESPN3		Loyola-Chicago	L 41–57	4–14 (2–5)	Redbird Arena (1,313); Normal, IL
01/29/2016; 7:00 pm		at Evansville	W 64–57	5–14 (3–5)	Ford Center (512); Evansville, IN
01/31/2016; 2:00 pm, ESPN3		at Southern Illinois	L 71–76	5–15 (3–6)	SIU Arena (789); Carbondale, IL
02/05/2016; 7:00 pm, ESPN3		Indiana State	W 73–62	6–15 (4–6)	Redbird Arena (1,240); Normal, IL
02/12/2016; 6:00 pm, ESPN3		Drake	L 58–98	6–16 (4–7)	Redbird Arena (613); Normal, IL
02/14/2016; 7:00 pm, ESPN3		Northern Iowa	L 35–61	6–17 (4–8)	Redbird Arena (362); Normal, IL
02/19/2016; 7:00 pm		at Loyola-Chicago	L 61–73	6–18 (4–9)	Joseph J. Gentile Arena (536); Chicago, IL
02/21/2016; 2:00 pm		at Bradley	L 38–52	6–19 (4–10)	Renaissance Coliseum (717); Peoria, IL
02/25/2016; 7:30 pm, ESPN3		Southern Illinois	L 55–68	6–20 (4–11)	Redbird Arena (572); Normal, IL
02/28/2016; 2:00 pm, ESPN3		Evansville	W 65–59	7–20 (5–11)	Redbird Arena (925); Normal, IL
03/03/2016; 7:00 pm		at Wichita State	W 53–49	8–20 (6–11)	Charles Koch Arena (1,545); Wichita, KS
03/05/2016; 2:00 pm		at Missouri State	L 41–70	8–21 (6–12)	JQH Arena (3,748); Springfield, MO
Missouri Valley Women's Tournament
03/10/2016; 7:00 pm, ESPN3		vs. Evansville; First Round	L 59–61 ^{OT}	8–22	iWireless Center; Moline, IL
*Non-conference game. ^{#}Rankings from AP Poll. (#) Tournament seedings in parentheses. All times are in Central Time.

== See also ==
- 2015–16 Illinois State Redbirds men's basketball team
