= 2015–16 Wichita State Shockers women's basketball team =

Intercollegiate basketball season

2015–16 Wichita State Shockers women's basketball
- Conference: Missouri Valley Conference
- Record: 8–22 (5–13 MVC)
- Head coach: Jody Adams (8th season)
- Assistant coaches: Kirk Crawford; Bridgette Gordon; Kaci Bailey
- Home arena: Charles Koch Arena (10,506)

2015–16 Missouri Valley Conference women's basketball standings
	Conf.				Overall
Team	W		L	PCT	W		L	PCT
Northern Iowa	15	–	3	.833	24	–	11	.686
Missouri State †	14	–	4	.778	24	–	10	.706
Drake	14	–	4	.778	23	–	10	.697
Southern Illinois	12	–	6	.667	20	–	13	.606
Loyola-Chicago	10	–	8	.556	14	–	16	.467
Indiana State	9	–	9	.500	13	–	17	.433
Illinois State	6	–	12	.333	8	–	22	.267
Wichita State	5	–	13	.278	8	–	22	.267
Bradley	4	–	14	.222	9	–	22	.290
Evansville	1	–	17	.056	3	–	28	.097
† 2016 MVC tournament winner As of March 24, 2016; Rankings from AP poll

The 2015–16 Wichita State Shockers women's basketball team represented Wichita State University in the 2015–16 NCAA Division I women's basketball season. They played their home games at Charles Koch Arena, which has a capacity of 10,506. The Shockers, led by eighth year head coach Jody Adams and were members of the Missouri Valley Conference. They finished the season 8–22, 5–13 in MVC play to finish in eighth place. They lost in the first round of the Missouri Valley women's tournament to Bradley.

== Roster ==
2015–16 Wichita State Shockers women's basketball team
Players
Coaches

Pos.	#	Name	Height	Year	Hometown
G	3	Aundra Stovall	5 ft 2 in (1.57 m)	So	Seguin HS	Arlington, TX
G	4	Diamond Lockhart	5 ft 5 in (1.65 m)	Jr	Red Oak HS	Red Oak, TX
F	11	Sabrina Lozada-Cabbage	6 ft 2 in (1.88 m)	Fr	Santa Fe HS	Santa Fe, NM
F	12	Jyar Francis	6 ft 1 in (1.85 m)	Fr	Ponchatoula HS	Hammond, LA
G	14	Marija Pacar	6 ft 0 in (1.83 m)	Jr	New Hope Christian Academy; Tallahassee CC	Podstrana, Croatia
C	20	Brittany Martin	6 ft 3 in (1.91 m)	Jr	Bishop Ford HS; NW Florida State	Queens Village, NY
G	23	TaQuandra Mike	5 ft 9 in (1.75 m)	Jr	Groves HS; South Georgia Tech College	Savannah, GA
G	25	Jaleesa Chapel	5 ft 9 in (1.75 m)	Jr	Dekaney HS	Spring, TX
F	34	Ellie Lehne	6 ft 2 in (1.88 m)	Fr	Byron HS	Byron, IL
F	35	Rangie Bessard	6 ft 0 in (1.83 m)	RS Fr	Manvel HS	Rosharon, TX

Head coach

- Jody Adams (Tennessee)

Assistant coach(es)

- Kirk Crawford (Western State)
- Bridgette Gordon (Tennessee)
- Kaci Bailey (Southern Illinois)

Legend

- (C) Team captain
- (S) Suspended
- (I) Ineligible
- (W) Walk-on
- Injured
- Current redshirt

Roster

== Schedule ==
Date time, TV	Rank^{#}	Opponent^{#}	Result	Record	Site (attendance) city, state
Exhibition
11/08/2015*; 2:05 pm		Central Oklahoma	W 68–61		Charles Koch Arena; Wichita, KS
Non-conference regular season
11/13/2015*; 12:05 pm		at Creighton	L 54–79	0–1	D. J. Sokol Arena (1,071); Omaha, NE
11/18/2015*; 7:05 pm, ESPN3		Missouri	L 37–57	0–2	Charles Koch Arena (1,479); Wichita, KS
11/21/2015*; 7:00 pm		at Arkansas State	L 40–67	0–3	Convention Center (735); Jonesboro, AR
11/27/2015*; 1:00 pm		vs. Richmond; FIU Turkey Slam semifinals	L 50–63	0–4	FIU Arena; Miami, FL
11/29/2015*; 1:00 pm		at FIU; FIU Turkey Slam 3rd place game	W 76–62	1–4	FIU Arena (316); Miami, FL
12/04/2015*; 12:05 pm, ESPN3		Southeast Missouri State	L 82–86 ^{OT}	1–5	Charles Koch Arena (8,474); Wichita, KS
12/11/2015*; 7:05 pm, Cox Kansas		No. 16 Tennessee	L 51–58	1–6	Charles Koch Arena (2,424); Wichita, KS
12/15/2015*; 7:05 pm, ESPN3		Eastern Washington	L 62–67	1–7	Charles Koch Arena (1,337); Wichita, KS
12/18/2015*; 7:05 pm, ESPN3		Prairie View A&M; Shocker Winter Classic	W 64–36	2–7	Charles Koch Arena (1,237); Wichita, KS
12/19/2015*; 3:00 pm, ESPN3		North Carolina A&T; Shocker Winter Classic	W 55–53	3–7	Charles Koch Arena (1,272); Wichita, KS
12/22/2015*; 6:00 pm		at Tennessee Tech	L 48–54	3–8	Eblen Center (550); Cookeville, TN
12/29/2015*; 7:05 pm		Oklahoma Christian	W 63–45		Charles Koch Arena (1,507); Wichita, KS
Missouri Valley Conference regular season
01/01/2016; 6:05 pm		at Indiana State	L 33–59	3–9 (0–1)	Hulman Center (1,621); Terre Haute, IN
01/03/2016; 2:00 pm		at Illinois State	L 49–70	3–10 (0–2)	Redbird Arena (602); Normal, IL
01/08/2016; 7:00 pm, ESPN3		Northern Iowa	L 44–55	3–11 (0–3)	Charles Koch Arena (2,356); Wichita, KS
01/10/2016; 2:00 pm, Cox Kansas		Drake	L 56–87	3–12 (0–4)	Charles Koch Arena (1,559); Wichita, KS
01/15/2016; 7:00 pm, ESPN3		at Loyola Chicago	L 55–60	3–13 (0–5)	Joseph J. Gentile Arena (312); Chicago, IL
01/17/2016; 2:00 pm		at Bradley	L 44–50	3–14 (0–6)	Renaissance Coliseum (768); Peoria, IL
01/22/2016; 7:00 pm, ESPN3		Southern Illinois	W 57–48	4–14 (1–6)	Charles Koch Arena (1,783); Wichita, KS
01/24/2016; 7:00 pm, ESPN3		Evansville	W 58–50	5–14 (2–6)	Charles Koch Arena (1,577); Wichita, KS
01/30/2016; 2:00 pm, Cox Kansas		Missouri State	L 57–77	5–15 (2–7)	Charles Koch Arena (1,552); Wichita, KS
02/05/2016; 7:00 pm		at Drake	L 59–81	5–16 (2–8)	Knapp Center (2,378); Des Moines, IA
02/07/2016; 2:00 pm		at Northern Iowa	L 48–69	5–17 (2–9)	McLeod Center (1,226); Cedar Falls, IA
02/12/2016; 7:00 pm, ESPN3		Bradley	L 50–55	5–18 (2–10)	Charles Koch Arena (1,373); Wichita, KS
02/14/2016; 2:00 pm, ESPN3		Loyola Chicago	W 65–62 ^{OT}	6–18 (3–10)	Charles Koch Arena (1,634); Wichita, KS
02/19/2016; 7:00 pm, ESPN3		at Evansville	W 44–31	7–18 (4–10)	Ford Center (507); Evansville, IN
02/21/2016; 2:00 pm		at Southern Illinois	L 66–80	7–19 (4–11)	SIU Arena (616); Carbondale, IL
02/27/2016; 2:00 pm, ESPN3		at Missouri State	L 45–74	7–20 (4–12)	JQH Arena (3,539); Springfield, MO
03/03/2016; 7:00 pm, ESPN3		Illinois State	L 49–53	7–21 (4–13)	Charles Koch Arena (1,545); Wichita, KS
03/05/2016; 2:00 pm, ESPN3		Indiana State	W 54–53	8–21 (5–13)	Charles Koch Arena (1,627); Wichita, KS
Missouri Valley Tournament
03/10/2016; 4:00 pm, ESPN3		vs. Bradley; First Round	L 51–56	8–22	iWireless Center; Moline, IL
*Non-conference game. ^{#}Rankings from AP Poll. (#) Tournament seedings in parentheses. All times are in Central Time.

== Rankings ==
+ Regular season polls	Poll	Pre- Season	Week 2	Week 3	Week 4	Week 5	Week 6	Week 7	Week 8	Week 9	Week 10	Week 11	Week 12	Week 13	Week 14	Week 15	Week 16	Week 17	Week 18	Final
AP																				
Coaches																				

Legend
	Increase in ranking
	Decrease in ranking
	Not ranked previous week
(RV)	Received Votes

== See also ==
2015–16 Wichita State Shockers men's basketball team
