= 2015 Missouri Valley Conference women's basketball tournament =

- Classification: Division I
- Season: 2014–15
- Teams: 10
- Site: Family Arena; St. Charles, Missouri
- Television: ESPN3

2014–15 Missouri Valley Conference women's basketball standings
	Conf.				Overall
Team	W		L	PCT	W		L	PCT
Wichita State	17	–	1	.944	28	–	4	.875
Drake	15	–	3	.833	20	–	10	.667
Missouri State	13	–	5	.722	17	–	13	.567
Northern Iowa	12	–	6	.667	17	–	14	.548
Southern Illinois	10	–	8	.556	17	–	13	.567
Indiana State	7	–	11	.389	17	–	13	.567
Evansville	6	–	12	.333	13	–	18	.419
Bradley	5	–	13	.278	6	–	24	.200
Loyola-Chicago	3	–	15	.167	6	–	25	.194
Illinois State	2	–	16	.111	2	–	28	.067
† 2015 MVC tournament winner As of 14 March 2015; Rankings from AP poll

The 2015 Missouri Valley Conference women's basketball tournament, nicknamed "Arch Madness", is part of the 2014–15 NCAA Division I women's basketball season and will be played in St. Charles, Missouri March 12–15, 2015, at the Family Arena. This year marked the eighth consecutive and final year the tournament was held at Family Arena. The tournament would move to iWireless Center for the 2016 season. This year marked the first year every game would be televised live on ESPN3. The championship took place Sunday, March 15 at 2:07 PM (central). The tournament's winner received the Missouri Valley Conference's automatic bid to the 2015 NCAA tournament.

== Tournament bracket ==
First round Thursday, March 12; ESPN3
8	Bradley	55
9	Loyola-Chicago	67
7	Evansville	55
10	Illinois State	51

Quarterfinals; Friday, March 13; ESPN3
1	Wichita State	59
9	Loyola-Chicago	42
4	UNI	59
5	Southern Illinois	50
2	Drake	79
7	Evansville	84^{OT}
3	Missouri State	75
6	Indiana State	57

Semifinals; Saturday, March 14; ESPN3
1	Wichita State	56
4	UNI	42
7	Evansville	66
3	Missouri State	75

Championship; Sunday, March 15; ESPN3
1	Wichita State	85
3	Missouri State	71
