= 2014–15 Missouri State Lady Bears basketball team =

Intercollegiate basketball season

2014–15 Missouri State Lady Bears basketball

WNIT, First Round
- Conference: Missouri Valley Conference
- Record: 18–15 (13–5 The Valley)
- Head coach: Kellie Harper (2nd season)
- Assistant coaches: Jon Harper; Jennifer Sullivan; Jackie Stiles
- Home arena: JQH Arena

2014–15 Missouri Valley Conference women's basketball standings
	Conf.				Overall
Team	W		L	PCT	W		L	PCT
Wichita State	17	–	1	.944	28	–	4	.875
Drake	15	–	3	.833	20	–	10	.667
Missouri State	13	–	5	.722	17	–	13	.567
Northern Iowa	12	–	6	.667	17	–	14	.548
Southern Illinois	10	–	8	.556	17	–	13	.567
Indiana State	7	–	11	.389	17	–	13	.567
Evansville	6	–	12	.333	13	–	18	.419
Bradley	5	–	13	.278	6	–	24	.200
Loyola-Chicago	3	–	15	.167	6	–	25	.194
Illinois State	2	–	16	.111	2	–	28	.067
† 2015 MVC tournament winner As of 14 March 2015; Rankings from AP poll

The 2014–15 Missouri State Lady Bears basketball team represented Missouri State University during the 2014–15 NCAA Division I women's basketball season. The Lady Bears, led by second year head coach Kellie Harper, played their home games at JQH Arena and were members of the Missouri Valley Conference. They finished the season 18–15, 13–5 in MVC play to finish in third place. They advanced to the championship game of the Missouri Valley Tournament where they lost to Wichita State. They were invited to the Women's National Invitation Tournament where they lost to Tulsa in the first round.

== Roster ==
2014–15 Missouri State Bears women's basketball team
Players
Coaches

Pos.	#	Name	Height	Year	Previous school	Hometown
G	2	Lexi Hughes	5 ft 7 in (1.7 m)	So	Bishop Miege High	Kansas City, KS
G	3	Lee Ann Polowy	5 ft 7 in (1.7 m)	Fr	Blair Oaks High	Jefferson City, MO
G	4	Kenzie Williams	5 ft 10 in (1.78 m)	RS Jr	Mount Vernon High	Mount Vernon, MO
G	5	Liza Fruendt	5 ft 9 in (1.75 m)	Fr	Batavia High	Batavia, IL
G	11	Riley Israel	5 ft 4 in (1.63 m)	Fr	Crane High	Crane, MO
F/C	12	Hillary Chvatal	6 ft 2 in (1.88 m)	Jr	Rawlins County High	Atwood, KS
F	13	Audrey Holt	6 ft 1 in (1.85 m)	Fr	Rock Bridge High	Columbia, MO
G/F	15	NiJay Gaines	5 ft 11 in (1.8 m)	Sr	East High	Des Moines, IA
F	21	Aubrey Buckley	6 ft 1 in (1.85 m)	Fr	Parkview High	Springfield, MO
G	22	Tyonna Snow	5 ft 10 in (1.78 m)	Jr	Blue Springs High	Blue Springs, MO
G	30	Kori Farmer	4 ft 8 in (1.42 m)	Fr	Seckman High	Imperial, MO
F	34	Rachel Swartz	6 ft 3 in (1.91 m)	So	Stanwood High	Stanwood, WA
F	40	Onye Osemenam	6 ft 2 in (1.88 m)	So	Maranatha Christian Academy	Brooklyn Park, MN

Head coach

- Kellie Harper (Tennessee)

Assistant coach(es)

- Jon Harper (Auburn)
- Jennifer Sullivan (Memphis)
- Jackie Stiles (Missouri State)

Legend

- (C) Team captain
- (S) Suspended
- (I) Ineligible
- (W) Walk-on
- Injured
- Current redshirt

Roster

== Schedule ==
Date time, TV	Rank^{#}	Opponent^{#}	Result	Record	Site (attendance) city, state
Exhibition
11/04/2014*; 7:05 pm		Central Methodist	W 83–32	–	JQH Arena (2,305); Springfield, MO
11/09/2014*; 2:05 pm		Southwest Baptist	W 89–74	–	JQH Arena (2,573); Springfield, MO
Regular season
11/14/2014*; 4:00 pm		at Memphis	L 63–79	0–1	Elma Roane Fieldhouse (582); Memphis, TN
11/18/2014*; 7:00 pm, KOZL		at Arkansas–Little Rock	L 48–61	0–2	Jack Stephens Center (506); Little Rock, AR
11/22/2014*; 2:00 pm		at No. 21 Oklahoma State	L 36–77	0–3	Gallagher-Iba Arena (2,080); Stillwater, OK
11/24/2014*; 7:00 pm		at Oral Roberts	L 57–70	0–4	Mabee Center (707); Tulsa, OK
11/28/2014*; 8:30 pm		at Colorado; Omni Classic semifinals	L 57–89	0–5	Coors Events Center (2,190); Boulder, CO
11/29/2014*; 6:00 pm		vs. TCU; Omni Classic third place game	L 68–82	0–6	Coors Events Center (N/A); Boulder, CO
12/06/2014*; 7:05 pm		SIU Edwardsville	W 75–69	1–6	JQH Arena (217); Springfield, MO
12/10/2014*; 7:05 pm		Arkansas	L 50–59	1–7	JQH Arena (2,503); Springfield, MO
12/14/2014*; 2:05 pm		IUPUI	W 68–58	2–7	JQH Arena (2,612); Springfield, MO
12/19/2014*; 7:05 pm		Arkansas State	L 62–78	2–8	JQH Arena (2,315); Springfield, MO
12/30/2014*; 4:00 pm, KOZL		vs. Missouri	W 57–52	3–8	Sprint Center (4,052); Kansas City, MO
01/02/2015; 7:05 pm, MC22		Evansville	L 56–65	3–9 (0–1)	JQH Arena (2,594); Springfield, MO
01/04/2015; 2:05 pm		Indiana State	W 74–66	4–9 (1–1)	JQH Arena (2,312); Springfield, MO
01/09/2015; 7:05 pm, ESPN3		Wichita State	L 59–71	4–10 (1–2)	JQH Arena (3,067); Springfield, MO
01/16/2015; 7:00 pm		at Loyola (IL)	W 87–57	5–10 (2–2)	Joseph J. Gentile Arena (603); Chicago, IL
01/18/2015; 2:00 pm		at Bradley	W 78–64	6–10 (3–2)	Renaissance Coliseum (538); Peoria, IL
01/23/2015; 7:05 pm		Southern Illinois	W 61–57	7–10 (4–2)	JQH Arena (2,664); Springfield, MO
01/25/2015; 2:05 pm, ESPN3		Illinois State	W 58–35	8–10 (5–2)	JQH Arena (2,572); Springfield, MO
01/30/2015; 7:05 pm		at Drake	L 89–94 ^{OT}	8–11 (5–3)	Knapp Center (2,523); Des Moines, IA
02/01/2015; 2:00 pm		at Northern Iowa	L 56–64	8–12 (5–4)	McLeod Center (1,987); Cedar Falls, IA
02/08/2015; 2:00 pm		at Wichita State	L 50–69	8–13 (5–5)	Charles Koch Arena (1,814); Wichita, KS
02/13/2015; 7:05 pm		Bradley	W 69–61	9–13 (6–5)	JQH Arena (2,470); Springfield, MO
02/15/2015; 7:05 pm		Loyola (IL)	W 83–64	10–13 (7–5)	JQH Arena (1,319); Springfield, MO
02/20/2015; 6:00 pm		at Southern Illinois	W 73–57	11–13 (8–5)	SIU Arena (595); Carbondale, IL
02/22/2015; 2:05 pm		at Illinois State	W 90–78	12–13 (9–5)	Redbird Arena (1,010); Normal, IL
02/27/2015; 7:05 pm		Northern Iowa	W 72–70	13–13 (10–5)	JQH Arena (3,460); Springfield, MO
03/01/2015; 2:05 pm		Drake	W 86–57	14–13 (11–5)	JQH Arena (2,575); Springfield, MO
03/05/2015; 6:05 pm		at Indiana State	W 65–56	15–13 (12–5)	Hulman Center (1,680); Terre Haute, IN
03/07/2015; 2:00 pm		at Evansville	W 86–71	16–13 (13–5)	Ford Center (627); Evansville, IN
Missouri Valley Women's Tournament
03/13/2015; 8:35 pm, ESPN3	(3)	vs. (6) Indiana State; Quarterfinals	W 75–57	17–13	Family Arena (1,575); St. Charles, MO
03/14/2015; 4:07 pm, ESPN3	(3)	vs. (7) Evansville; Semifinals	W 75–66	18–13	Family Arena (1,582); St. Charles, MO
03/15/2015; 2:07 pm, ESPN3	(3)	vs. (1) Wichita State; Championship	L 71–85	18–14	Family Arena (1,382); St. Charles, MO
WNIT
03/20/2015; 7:05 pm		Tulsa; First Round	L 72–78	18–15	JQH Arena (2,320); Springfield, MO
*Non-conference game. ^{#}Rankings from AP Poll. (#) Tournament seedings in parentheses. All times are in Central Time.

== See also ==
- 2014–15 Missouri State Bears basketball team
