= 2016 Missouri Valley Conference women's basketball tournament =

- Classification: Division I
- Season: 2015–16
- Teams: 10
- Site: iWireless Center; Moline, Illinois
- Champions: Missouri State (10th title)
- Winning coach: Kellie Harper (1st title)
- MVP: Tyonna Snow (Missouri State)
- Television: ESPN3

2015–16 Missouri Valley Conference women's basketball standings
	Conf.				Overall
Team	W		L	PCT	W		L	PCT
Northern Iowa	15	–	3	.833	24	–	11	.686
Missouri State †	14	–	4	.778	24	–	10	.706
Drake	14	–	4	.778	23	–	10	.697
Southern Illinois	12	–	6	.667	20	–	13	.606
Loyola-Chicago	10	–	8	.556	14	–	16	.467
Indiana State	9	–	9	.500	13	–	17	.433
Illinois State	6	–	12	.333	8	–	22	.267
Wichita State	5	–	13	.278	8	–	22	.267
Bradley	4	–	14	.222	9	–	22	.290
Evansville	1	–	17	.056	3	–	28	.097
† 2016 MVC tournament winner As of March 24, 2016; Rankings from AP poll

The 2016 Missouri Valley Conference women's basketball tournament is part of the 2015–16 NCAA Division I women's basketball season and was played in Moline, Illinois March 10–13, 2015, at the iWireless Center. The tournament's winner received the Missouri Valley Conference's automatic bid to the 2016 NCAA tournament.

== Seeds ==
2016 Missouri Valley Conference women's basketball tournament seeds and results
Seed	School	Conf.	Over.	Tiebreaker
1	‡ - Northern Iowa	15–3	20–9	
2	# - Drake	14–4	21–8	2–0 vs. Missouri State
3	# - Missouri State	14–4	21–9	0–2 vs. Drake
4	# - Southern Illinois	12–6	19–11	
5	# - Loyola-Chicago	10–8	14–15	
6	# - Indiana State	9–9	13–16	
7	Illinois State	6–12	8–21	
8	Wichita State	5–13	8–21	
9	Bradley	4–14	8–21	
10	Evansville	1–17	2–17	
‡ – Missouri Valley Conference regular season champions, and tournament No. 1 seed. # - Received a single-bye in the conference tournament. Overall records include all games played in the Missouri Valley Conference tournament.

== Schedule ==
Session	Game	Time*	Matchup^{#}	Television	Attendance
First round – Thursday, March 10
1	1	4:00 pm	#9 Bradley vs #8 Wichita State	ESPN3	
1	2	7:00 pm	#7 Illinois State vs #10 Evansville	ESPN3	
Quarterfinals – Friday, March 11
2	3	12:00 pm	#1 Northern Iowa vs #9 Bradley	ESPN3	
2	4	2:30 pm	#5 Loyola-Chicago vs #4 Southern Illinois	ESPN3	
3	5	6:00 pm	#2 Drake vs #10 Evansville	ESPN3	1,525
3	6	8:30 pm	#3 Missouri State vs #6 Indiana State	ESPN3	1,525
Semifinals – Saturday, March 12
4	7	1:30 pm	#1 Northern Iowa vs #4 Southern Illinois	ESPN3	2,241
4	8	4:00 pm	#2 Drake vs #3 Missouri State	ESPN3	2,241
Final – Sunday, March 13
5	9	2:00 pm	#1 Northern Iowa vs #3 Missouri State	ESPN3	1,842
*Game Times in CT. #-Rankings denote tournament seed

== Tournament bracket ==
First round Thursday, March 10; ESPN3
8	Wichita State	51
9	Bradley	56
7	Illinois State	59
10	Evansville	61^{OT}

Quarterfinals; Friday, March 11; ESPN3
1	Northern Iowa	46
9	Bradley	45
4	Southern Illinois	73
5	Loyola-Chicago	64
2	Drake	89
10	Evansville	53
3	Missouri State	70
6	Indiana State	45

Semifinals; Saturday, March 12; ESPN3
1	Northern Iowa	67
4	Southern Illinois	43
2	Drake	61
3	Missouri State	65

Championship; Sunday, March 13; ESPN3
1	Northern Iowa	58
3	Missouri State	71

== See also ==
- 2016 Missouri Valley Conference men's basketball tournament
