= 2015–16 Northern Iowa Panthers women's basketball team =

Intercollegiate basketball season

2015–16 Northern Iowa Panthers women's basketball

MVC Regular Season Champions

WNIT, Third Round
- Conference: Missouri Valley Conference
- Record: 24–11 (15–3 The Valley)
- Head coach: Tanya Warren (9th season)
- Assistant coaches: Brad Nelson; Adam DeJoode; Tiffany Coppage
- Home arena: McLeod Center

2015–16 Missouri Valley Conference women's basketball standings
	Conf.				Overall
Team	W		L	PCT	W		L	PCT
Northern Iowa	15	–	3	.833	24	–	11	.686
Missouri State †	14	–	4	.778	24	–	10	.706
Drake	14	–	4	.778	23	–	10	.697
Southern Illinois	12	–	6	.667	20	–	13	.606
Loyola-Chicago	10	–	8	.556	14	–	16	.467
Indiana State	9	–	9	.500	13	–	17	.433
Illinois State	6	–	12	.333	8	–	22	.267
Wichita State	5	–	13	.278	8	–	22	.267
Bradley	4	–	14	.222	9	–	22	.290
Evansville	1	–	17	.056	3	–	28	.097
† 2016 MVC tournament winner As of March 24, 2016; Rankings from AP poll

The 2015–16 Northern Iowa Panthers women's basketball team represented the University of Northern Iowa in the 2015–16 NCAA Division I women's basketball season. The Panthers, led by ninth year head coach Tanya Warren, played their home games at McLeod Center and are members of the Missouri Valley Conference. They finished the season 24–11, 15–3 in Missouri Valley League play to win the Missouri Valley Regular season title. They advanced to the semifinals of the Missouri Valley Tournament, where they lost to Missouri State. They were invited to the Women's National Invitation Tournament, where they defeated Nebraska and Drake in the first and second rounds before losing to South Dakota in the third round.

== Roster ==
2015–16 Northern Iowa Panthers women's basketball team
Players
Coaches

Pos.	#	Name	Height	Year	Previous school	Hometown
G	1	Mariah Criswell	5 ft 8 in (1.73 m)	Fr	Winterset	Van Meter, IA
G	2	Madison Weekley	5 ft 7 in (1.7 m)	Jr	Benton Community	Atkins, IA
G	4	Lauren Parker	5 ft 9 in (1.75 m)	RS So	Homewood Flossmoor	Flossmoor, IL
F	5	Amber Sorenson	6 ft 2 in (1.88 m)	RS Sr	Caledonia	Caledonia, MN
G	10	Ellie Herzberg	5 ft 9 in (1.75 m)	So	Manson Northwest Webster	Manson, IA
G	11	Angie Davison	5 ft 9 in (1.75 m)	Jr	Maple Grove	Maple Grove, MN
G	13	Sharnae Lamar	5 ft 2 in (1.57 m)	RS Sr	Des Moines East	Des Moines, IA
G	14	Stephanie Davison	5 ft 10 in (1.78 m)	RS Sr	Maple Grove	Maple Grove, MN
F	15	Dariann Garrison-Nickerson	5 ft 10 in (1.78 m)	Fr	Des Moines East	West Des Moines, IA
F	20	Hannah Schonhardt	6 ft 2 in (1.88 m)	RS Jr	Holy Family Catholic	Waconia, MN
G	22	Rose Simon-Ressler	5 ft 10 in (1.78 m)	Fr	Western Dubuque	Epworth, IA
G	24	Mikaela Morgan	5 ft 10 in (1.78 m)	Fr	Iowa City West	Coralville, IA
F	32	Heidi Hillyard	6 ft 0 in (1.83 m)	Fr	Mediapolis	Burlington, IA
F	34	Taylor Hagen	6 ft 1 in (1.85 m)	Fr	Blooming Prairie	Blooming Prairie, MN
F	42	Jen Keitel	6 ft 3 in (1.91 m)	RS Sr	Central Community	DeWitt, IA
F	44	Alyssa Johnson	6 ft 3 in (1.91 m)	RS Jr	Estherville Lincoln Central	Estherville, IA

Head coach

- Tanya Warren (Creighton)

Assistant coach(es)

- Brad Nelson (Oregon)
- Adam DeJoode (Iowa State)
- Tiffany Coppage (Missouri State)

Legend

- (C) Team captain
- (S) Suspended
- (I) Ineligible
- (W) Walk-on
- Injured
- Current redshirt

Roster

== Schedule ==
Date time, TV	Rank^{#}	Opponent^{#}	Result	Record	Site (attendance) city, state
Exhibition
11/08/2015*; 2:00 pm		Sioux Falls	W 82–66		McLeod Center; Cedar Falls, IA
Non-conference regular season
11/15/2015*; 2:00 pm, ESPN3		Rockhurst	W 58–39	1–0	McLeod Center (1,318); Cedar Falls, IA
11/17/2015*; 7:00 pm, ESPN3		South Dakota	W 64–43	2–0	McLeod Center (1,207); Cedar Falls, IA
11/22/2015*; 2:00 pm, ESPN3		Iowa	L 65–80	2–1	McLeod Center (2,384); Cedar Falls, IA
11/26/2015*; 8:00 pm		vs. Georgia Tech; Women's Cancún Challenge Riviera Division	W 61–58	3–1	Hard Rock Hotel Riviera Maya (133); Cancún, Mexico
11/27/2015*; 8:00 pm		vs. Seton Hall; Women's Cancún Challenge Riviera Division	L 49–57	3–2	Hard Rock Hotel Riviera Maya (133); Cancún, Mexico
12/02/2015*; 7:00 pm, ESPN3		Iowa State	L 75–84	3–3	McLeod Center (2,095); Cedar Falls, IA
12/05/2015*; 2:00 pm		at North Dakota	L 59–64	3–4	Betty Engelstad Sioux Center (2,012); Grand Forks, ND
12/09/2015*; 7:00 pm		at South Dakota State	L 86–89 ^{2OT}	3–5	Frost Arena (1,547); Brookings, SD
12/13/2015*; 1:00 pm, ESPN3		vs. Akron	W 59–51	4–5	iWireless Center (634); Moline, IL
12/20/2015*; 2:00 pm, ESPN3		Tulsa	W 75–59	5–5	McLeod Center (1,341); Cedar Falls, IA
12/22/2015*; 6:05 pm		at Creighton	L 61–69	5–6	D. J. Sokol Arena (1,228); Omaha, NE
Missouri Valley Conference Regular season
01/01/2016; 7:00 pm, ESPN3		Evansville	W 62–51	6–6 (1–0)	McLeod Center (1,107); Cedar Falls, IA
01/03/2016; 2:00 pm, ESPN3		Southern Illinois	L 60–65	6–7 (1–1)	McLeod Center (1,282); Cedar Falls, IA
01/08/2016; 7:00 pm, ESPN3		at Wichita State	W 55–44	7–7 (2–1)	Charles Koch Arena (2,356); Wichita, KS
01/10/2016; 2:05 pm, ESPN3		at Missouri State	W 65–60	8–7 (3–1)	JQH Arena (2,846); Springfield, MO
01/15/2016; 7:00 pm, ESPN3		Illinois State	W 65–51	9–7 (4–1)	McLeod Center (1,207); Cedar Falls, IA
01/17/2016; 2:00 pm, ESPN3		Indiana State	W 53–42	10–7 (5–1)	McLeod Center (1,278); Cedar Falls, IA
01/24/2016; 2:00 pm, ESPN3		at Drake; Rivalry	W 79–73	11–7 (5–2)	Knapp Center (2,853); Des Moines, IA
01/29/2016; 7:00 pm, ESPN3		Loyola-Chicago	L 60–64	11–8 (6–2)	Joseph J. Gentile Arena (426); Chicago, IL
01/31/2016; 2:00 pm, ESPN3		at Bradley	W 55–47	12–8 (7–2)	Renaissance Coliseum (1,015); Peoria, IL
02/05/2016; 7:00 pm, ESPN3		at Missouri State	L 75–78 ^{OT}	12–9 (7–3)	McLeod Center (1,370); Cedar Falls, IA
02/07/2016; 7:00 pm, ESPN3		Wichita State	W 69–48	13–9 (8–3)	McLeod Center (1,226); Cedar Falls, IA
02/12/2016; 6:05 pm, ESPN3		at Indiana State	W 61–45	14–9 (9–3)	Hulman Center (1,381); Terre Haute, IN
02/14/2016; 7:00 pm, ESPN3		at Illinois State	W 61–35	15–9 (10–3)	Redbird Arena (362); Normal, IL
02/19/2016; 7:00 pm, ESPN3		Drake; Rivalry	W 85–74	16–9 (11–3)	McLeod Center (2,102); Cedar Falls, IA
02/26/2016; 7:00 pm, ESPN3		Bradley	W 65–41	17–9 (12–3)	McLeod Center (1,505); Cedar Falls, IA
02/28/2016; 2:00 pm, ESPN3		Loyola-Chicago	W 63–52	18–9 (13–3)	McLeod Center (1,942); Cedar Falls, IA
03/03/2016; 6:00 pm, ESPN3		at Southern Illinois	W 73–64	19–9 (14–3)	SIU Arena (594); Carbondale, IL
03/05/2016; 12:00 pm, ESPN3		at Evansville	W 61–48	20–9 (15–3)	Ford Center (451); Evansville, IN
Missouri Valley Tournament
03/11/2016; 12:00 pm, ESPN3		vs. Bradley; Quarterfinals	W 46–45	21–9	iWireless Center; Moline, IL
03/12/2016; 1:30 pm, ESPN3		vs. Southern Illinois; Semifinals	W 67–43	22–9	iWireless Center; Moline, IL
03/13/2016; 2:00 pm, ESPN3		vs. Missouri State; Championship Game	L 58–71	22–10	iWireless Center; Moline, IL
WNIT
03/17/2016*; 7:00 pm		at Nebraska; First Round	W 64–62	23–10	Pinnacle Bank Arena (2,942); Lincoln, NE
03/19/2016*; 7:00 pm		Drake; Second Round	W 64–58	24–10	McLeod Center (1,140); Cedar Falls, IA
03/24/2016*; 7:00 pm		at South Dakota; Third Round	L 50–51	24–11	DakotaDome (2,433); Vermillion, SD
*Non-conference game. ^{#}Rankings from AP Poll. (#) Tournament seedings in parentheses. All times are in Central Time.

== See also ==
2015–16 Northern Iowa Panthers men's basketball team
