= 2015–16 Drake Bulldogs women's basketball team =

Intercollegiate basketball season

2015–16 Drake Bulldogs women's basketball

Lady Rebel Round-Up Champions

WNIT, Second Round
- Conference: Missouri Valley Conference
- Record: 23–10 (14–4 The Valley)
- Head coach: Jennie Baranczyk (4th season)
- Assistant coaches: Allison Pohlman; Jacqui Kalin; Dominique Kelley
- Home arena: Knapp Center

2015–16 Missouri Valley Conference women's basketball standings
	Conf.				Overall
Team	W		L	PCT	W		L	PCT
Northern Iowa	15	–	3	.833	24	–	11	.686
Missouri State †	14	–	4	.778	24	–	10	.706
Drake	14	–	4	.778	23	–	10	.697
Southern Illinois	12	–	6	.667	20	–	13	.606
Loyola-Chicago	10	–	8	.556	14	–	16	.467
Indiana State	9	–	9	.500	13	–	17	.433
Illinois State	6	–	12	.333	8	–	22	.267
Wichita State	5	–	13	.278	8	–	22	.267
Bradley	4	–	14	.222	9	–	22	.290
Evansville	1	–	17	.056	3	–	28	.097
† 2016 MVC tournament winner As of March 24, 2016; Rankings from AP poll

The 2015–16 Drake Bulldogs women's basketball team represented Drake University during the 2015–16 NCAA Division I women's basketball season. The Bulldogs were led by fourth year head coach Jennie Baranczyk, and Jacqui Kalin served as an Assistant Women's Basketball Coach.

They played their home games at Knapp Center and were members of the Missouri Valley Conference. They finished the season 24–10, 14–4 in MVC play to finish in a tie for second place. They advanced to the semifinals of the Missouri Valley women's tournament where they lost to Missouri State. They were invited to the Women's National Invitation Tournament where they defeated Sacred Heart before losing to Missouri Valley member Northern Iowa in the second round.

== Roster ==
2015–16 Drake Bulldogs women's basketball team
Players
Coaches

Pos.	#	Name	Height	Year	Previous school	Hometown
F	3	Lizzy Wendell	6 ft 0 in (1.83 m)	Jr	Blue Springs	Blue Springs, MO
C	5	Emma Donahue	6 ft 3 in (1.91 m)	Sr	Naperville Central	Naperville, IL
G	15	Paige Greiner	5 ft 5 in (1.65 m)	So	Williamsburg	Williamsburg, IA
G	20	Maddy Dean	5 ft 9 in (1.75 m)	So	Jordan	Jordan, MN
G	21	Sammie Bachrodt	5 ft 10 in (1.78 m)	Fr	Kapaun Mt. Carmel	Wichita, KS
G	22	Caitlin Ingle	5 ft 8 in (1.73 m)	Jr	Southeast Polk	Runnells, IA
G	24	Nicole Miller	5 ft 9 in (1.75 m)	Fr	North Linn	Walker, IA
G	34	Cortni Rush	5 ft 10 in (1.78 m)	Jr	Mason City; North Iowa Area	Mason City, IA
F/C	35	Becca Jonas	6 ft 2 in (1.88 m)	So	Truman	Independence, MO
F	50	Sara Rhine	6 ft 1 in (1.85 m)	Fr	Eldon	Eldon, MO

Head coach

Jennie Baranczyk (Iowa)

Assistant coach(es)

Allison Pohlman (Northern Iowa)
Jacqui Kalin (Northern Iowa)
Dominique Kelley (Nebraska)

Legend

- (C) Team captain
- (S) Suspended
- (I) Ineligible
- (W) Walk-on
- Injured
- Current redshirt

Roster

== Schedule ==
Date time, TV	Rank^{#}	Opponent^{#}	Result	Record	Site (attendance) city, state
Exhibition
11/03/2015*; 7:00 pm		Grand View	W 96–46		Knapp Center (1,929); Des Moines, IA
11/08/2015*; 7:00 pm		Simpson	W 94–61		Knapp Center (1,947); Des Moines, IA
Non-conference regular season
11/15/2015*; 2:00 pm, ESPN3		Iowa State	W 74–70	1–0	Knapp Center (4,251); Des Moines, IA
11/18/2015*; 7:00 pm		at Wisconsin	W 89–70	2–0	Kohl Center (2,974); Madison, WI
11/22/2015*; 2:00 pm, ESPN3		North Dakota	W 73–63	3–0	Knapp Center (2,064); Des Moines, IA
11/24/2015*; 7:00 pm, ESPN3		Creighton	W 81–72	4–0	Knapp Center (2,462); Des Moines, IA
11/28/2015*; 4:30 pm		vs. Tulsa; Lady Rebel Round-Up semifinals	W 91–80	5–0	Cox Pavilion (840); Paradise, NV
11/29/2015*; 4:30 pm		at UNLV; Lady Rebel Round-Up championship	W 76–68	6–0	Cox Pavilion (774); Paradise, NV
12/03/2015*; 7:00 pm		at South Dakota	L 87–92 ^{OT}	6–1	DakotaDome (1,484); Vermillion, SD
12/06/2015*; 2:00 pm, ESPN3		Green Bay	L 61–86	6–2	Knapp Center (2,294); Des Moines, IA
12/11/2015*; 11:00 am, ESPN3		William Penn	W 100–61	7–2	Knapp Center (4,711); Des Moines, IA
12/19/2015*; 4:30 pm		at Northern Illinois	L 73–87	7–3	Convocation Center (1,290); DeKalb, IL
12/22/2015*; 5:00 pm		at Iowa	L 76–89	7–4	Carver–Hawkeye Arena (5,430); Iowa City, IA
Missouri Valley Conference regular season
01/01/2016; 2:00 pm, ESPN3		Southern Illinois	L 67–77	7–5 (0–1)	Knapp Center (2,024); Des Moines, IA
01/03/2016; 4:00 pm, MC22		Evansville	W 94–52	8–5 (1–1)	Knapp Center (2,215); Des Moines, IA
01/08/2016; 7:00 pm, ESPN3		at Missouri State	W 82–75	9–5 (2–1)	JQH Arena (3,225); Springfield, MO
01/10/2016; 2:00 pm, ESPN3		at Wichita State	W 87–56	10–5 (3–1)	Charles Koch Arena (1,559); Wichita, KS
01/15/2016; 7:00 pm, ESPN3		Indiana State	W 80–55	11–5 (4–1)	Knapp Center (2,153); Des Moines, IA
01/17/2016; 6:00 pm, ESPN3		Illinois State	W 76–41	12–5 (5–1)	Knapp Center (2,413); Des Moines, IA
01/24/2016; 2:00 pm, MC22		Northern Iowa	L 73–79	12–6 (5–2)	Knapp Center (2,853); Des Moines, IA
01/29/2016; 7:00 pm, ESPN3		at Bradley	W 76–64	13–6 (6–2)	Renaissance Coliseum (591); Peoria, IL
01/31/2016; 2:00 pm, ESPN3		at Loyola-Chicago	W 81–65	14–6 (7–2)	Joseph J. Gentile Arena (417); Chicago, IL
02/05/2016; 7:00 pm, ESPN3		Wichita State	W 81–59	15–6 (8–2)	Knapp Center (2,378); Des Moines, IA
02/07/2016; 2:00 pm, ESPN3		Missouri State	W 95–72	16–6 (9–2)	Knapp Center (2,465); Des Moines, IA
02/12/2016; 7:00 pm, ESPN3		at Illinois State	W 98–58	17–6 (10–2)	Redbird Arena (613); Normal, IL
02/14/2016; 1:00 pm, ESPN3		at Indiana State	L 53–68	17–7 (10–3)	Hulman Center (1,861); Terre Haute, IN
02/19/2016; 7:00 pm, ESPN3		at Northern Iowa	L 74–85	17–8 (10–4)	McLeod Center (2,012); Cedar Falls, IA
02/26/2016; 7:00 pm, ESPN3		Loyola-Chicago	W 91–61	18–8 (11–4)	Knapp Center (2,834); Des Moines, IA
02/28/2016; 2:00 pm, ESPN3		Bradley	W 78–45	19–8 (12–4)	Knapp Center (2,433); Des Moines, IA
03/03/2016; 7:00 pm, ESPN3		at Evansville	W 86–66	20–8 (13–4)	Ford Center (394); Evansville, IL
03/05/2016; 2:00 pm, ESPN3		at Southern Illinois	W 71–64	21–8 (14–4)	SIU Arena (639); Carbondale, IL
Missouri Valley Women's Tournament
03/11/2016; 6:00 pm, ESPN3		vs. Evansville; Quarterfinals	W 89–53	22–8	iWireless Center; Moline, IL
03/12/2016; 4:00 pm, ESPN3		vs. Missouri State; Semifinals	L 61–65	22–9	iWireless Center (2,241); Moline, IL
WNIT
03/17/2016*; 7:00 pm		Sacred Heart; First Round	W 95–59	23–9	Knapp Center (806); Des Moines, IA
03/19/2016*; 7:00 pm		at Northern Iowa; Second Round	L 58–64	23–10	McLeod Center (1,140); Cedar Falls, IA
*Non-conference game. ^{#}Rankings from AP Poll. (#) Tournament seedings in parentheses. All times are in Central Time.

== Rankings ==
Regular season polls
Poll	Pre- Season	Week 2	Week 3	Week 4	Week 5	Week 6	Week 7	Week 8	Week 9	Week 10	Week 11	Week 12	Week 13	Week 14	Week 15	Week 16	Week 17	Week 18	Final
AP	NR	NR	NR	NR	NR	NR	NR	NR	NR	NR	NR	NR	NR	NR	NR	NR	NR	NR	NR
Coaches	NR	NR	NR	RV	NR	NR	NR	NR	NR	NR	NR	NR	NR	NR	NR	NR	NR	NR	NR

Legend
	Increase in ranking
	Decrease in ranking
	Not ranked previous week
(RV)	Received Votes

== See also ==
2015–16 Drake Bulldogs men's basketball team
