= Jody Adams (basketball) =

American basketball coach (born 1972)

Biographical details
- Born: December 28, 1972 (age 53); Cleveland, Tennessee, U.S.

Playing career
- 1990–1994: Tennessee

Coaching career (HC unless noted)
- 1994–1996: Auburn (Asst.)
- 1996–1997: Wake Forest (Asst.)
- 1997–2000: Minnesota (Asst.)
- 2000–2004: UMKC (Assoc. HC)
- 2004–2007: Southern Illinois (Assoc. HC)
- 2007–2008: Murray State
- 2008–2017: Wichita State
- 2018–2022: Southern Illinois (Asst.)
- 2022–2026: New Mexico State

Head coaching record
- Overall: 245–195 (.557)

Jody Michelle Adams-Birch (born December 28, 1972) is an American women's basketball coach who was most recently the head coach at New Mexico State University.

== Career ==
Adams-Birch played high school basketball at Bradley Central High School in Cleveland, Tennessee, from 1987 to 1989. She was named All District, All Region and District MVP during those three years and was the Region Tournament MVP in 1988 and 1989. Adams-Birch was the first girl to receive the Steve Sloan award, given annually to the top athlete at Bradley Central.

Adams-Birch played college basketball at the University of Tennessee under Coach Pat Summitt from 1990 to 1994. She was a four-year starting point guard for the Lady Volunteers and helped lead them to five SEC championships and the 1991 national championship.

After one season (2007–08) as head women's basketball coach at Murray State University, Adams-Birch served as head coach at Wichita State University from 2008 to 2017. She was also assistant coach at Southern Illinois University from 2018 to 2022.

She was hired as New Mexico State's women's basketball coach ahead of the 2022-23 season. The Aggies reached the final of the 2023 Women's Basketball Invitational in her first season and the second round of the 2025 Women's National Invitation Tournament in her third season. She was fired following the 2025-26 season after a 9-21 campaign.

Adams-Birch was hired as head girls basketball coach at her high school alma mater Bradley Central in May 2026.

== Personal life ==
She married Roy Birch in June 2016.

== Head coaching record ==
Record table
Season	Team	Overall	Conference	Standing	Postseason
Murray State Racers (Ohio Valley Conference) (2007–2008)
2007–08	Murray State	24–8	15–5	T–2nd	NCAA First Round
Murray State:		24–8 (.750)	15–5 (.750)		
Wichita State Shockers (Missouri Valley Conference) (2008–2017)
2008–09	Wichita State	13–18	4–14	T–9th	
2009–10	Wichita State	18–15	8–10	6th	WBI Second Round
2010–11	Wichita State	17–15	10–8	5th	WNIT First Round
2011–12	Wichita State	20–13	12–6	3rd	WNIT Second Round
2012–13	Wichita State	24–10	15–3	T–1st	NCAA First Round
2013–14	Wichita State	26–7	14–4	T–1st	NCAA First Round
2014–15	Wichita State	29–5	17–1	1st	NCAA First Round
2015–16	Wichita State	8–22	5–13	8th	
2016–17	Wichita State	8–10	3–4		
Wichita State:		163–115 (.586)	88–63 (.583)		
New Mexico State Aggies (WAC) (2022–2023)
2022–23	New Mexico State	18–17	10–8	T–5th	WBI Runner-up
New Mexico State Aggies (Conference USA) (2023–2026)
2023–24	New Mexico State	13–18	6–10	T–6th	
2024–25	New Mexico State	18–16	10–8	4th	WNIT Second Round
2025–26	New Mexico State	9–21	5–13	11th	
New Mexico State:		58–72 (.446)	31–39 (.443)		
Total:		245–195 (.557)			
National champion Postseason invitational champion Conference regular season champion Conference regular season and conference tournament champion Division regular season champion Division regular season and conference tournament champion Conference tournament champion
