= Jacqui Kalin =

American-Israeli basketball player

Jacqui Kalin ג'קי קיילין
Personal information
- Born: January 27, 1989 (age 37) Sioux City, Iowa
- Listed height: 5 ft 8 in (1.73 m)

Career information
- High school: North High School
- College: University of Northern Iowa
- Position: Point guard
- Coaching career: 2015–2016

Career history

Coaching
- Drake Bulldogs women's basketball team

Career highlights
- 2x MVC Player of the Year (2011, 2013); MVC Tournament MVP (2011); 3x First-team All-MVC (2010, 2011, 2013); MVC Freshman of the Year (2008); MVC All-Freshman Team (2008)
Medals
Women's basketball
Player representing United States
Maccabiah Games
| Gold medal – first place | 2013 Israel |

Jacqui Kalin (Hebrew: ג'קי קיילין; born January 27, 1989) is an American-Israeli former college and professional basketball 5-foot-8 point guard. In college at the University of Northern Iowa, she set the free throw percentage NCAA Division I career record, and was twice named the Missouri Valley Conference Player of the Year. She played two years of professional basketball in Israel, and played for the Israel women's national basketball team.

== Early and personal life ==
Kalin was born in Sioux City, Iowa, to Bruce and Linda Kalin, and is Jewish. She has two brothers, Michael and J.B., and a sister, Jenna. She and wife, Sarah Kalin, reside in Siren, Wisconsin where they also own and operate their brick and mortar coffee shop, Crosshatch Coffee Co.

== High school ==
She attended North High School. Kalin was valedictorian of her high school class. In 2007 she was named Academic All-State by the Iowa Girls' Coaches Association (IGCA).

Kalin played for the school basketball team for four years, leading it to a Class 4A Iowa State Championship in 2007, after which she was named to the 4A all-tournament team. As a junior she was second team All State, and as a senior she was first team All State.

In 2007 Kalin was named the Sioux City Journal Metro Female Athlete of the Year. In her high school career she scored 1,143 points (third on North's career scoring list). As a senior she averaged 15.5 points, 5.4 assists, 3.9 rebounds, and 3.4 steals per game. She holds the school records for assists in a season (146) and career (324), and for free throws in a career (245). She was named MVP of the 2007 Iowa Basketball Coaches Association Goalsetter All Star Game. She was named all-conference as a sophomore, junior, and senior.

Kalin played for the high school soccer team for five years, cross country one year, and track four years. She was named all-state in 2006 for the 400-meter hurdles, and holds the school and city record in the 400-meter hurdles (1:03.60).

== College ==
Kalin attended the University of Northern Iowa (UNI).

In her freshman year in 2007–08, playing for the UNI Panthers, Kalin led the Missouri Valley Conference (MVC) with an .899 free throw percentage (a school record, and the sixth-highest by any freshman in NCAA Division I history), and was named MVC Freshman of the Year and second team All-MVC. She suffered a left ankle injury, and was out for most of 2008–09. In 2009-10 she led the MVC with 89.7 percent free-throw shooting and was named first-team All-MVC and named to MVC Scholar-Athlete first team.

In 2010-11 Kalin shot 91.0% from the free-throw line (ranking fourth nationally) and had the nation's fifth-best assist-to-turnover ratio (2.51). She was named the Jackie Stiles MVC Player of the Year, first-team All-MVC, MVC Scholar-Athlete of the Year, second-team College Sports Information Directors of America (CoSIDA) Academic All-America, Jewish Sports Review 2010-11 college basketball All-American, and the Most Outstanding Player in the Missouri Valley Conference women's basketball tournament. She suffered a torn right ACL while making a reverse layup in a pick-up game in September 2011, and redshirted in 2011–12.

In 2012-13 she led the league in scoring (19.5 ppg; a school record), had the fourth-highest season free throw percentage in NCAA Division I history-and the highest of any senior (95.5%), and was named the 2013 Jackie Stiles MVC Player of the Year, the 2013 Scholar-Athlete of the Year (becoming the first player to win both distinctions twice in a career), the 2013 Marty Glickman Outstanding Female Jewish Scholar Athlete of the Year by the National Jewish Sports Hall of Fame, Jewish Sports Review First Team All-American, MVC All-Conference first team, CoSIDA Academic All-America first team, and CoSIDA Academic All-District team.

For her career Kalin was first all-time at UNI in scoring (2,081; 6th all-time in the MVC), 3-point field goals made (265), free throws made (484), free throw percentage (.920; the NCAA Division I career record, ahead of Shanna Zolman), assists (491), games started (136), games played (136), and minutes (4,352).

Kalin earned a bachelor's degree in exercise science with an emphasis in sports psychology in December 2010, with a 4.0 GPA and summa cum laude, and a master's degree in kinesiology/sports psychology in May 2013 from UNI.

Kalin helped lead the Panthers to consecutive NCAA Tournament berths, as the team won back-to-back MVC Tournament titles.

=== Northern Iowa statistics ===
Legend
| GP | Games played | GS | Games started | MPG | Minutes per game |
| FG% | Field goal percentage | 3P% | 3-point field goal percentage | FT% | Free throw percentage |
| RPG | Rebounds per game | APG | Assists per game | SPG | Steals per game |
| BPG | Blocks per game | PPG | Points per game | **Bold** | Career high |

| Year | Team | GP | Points | FG% | 3P% | FT% | RPG | APG | SPG | BPG | PPG |
|---|---|---|---|---|---|---|---|---|---|---|---|
| 2007-08 | Northern Iowa | 31 | 413 | 39.8% | 30.1% | 89.9% | 3.9 | **4.3** | 0.9 | **0.2** | 13.3 |
| 2008-09 | Northern Iowa | 5 | 33 | 28.9% | 12.5% | 90.0% | 2.8 | 2.8 | 0.2 | - | 6.6 |
| 2009-10 | Northern Iowa | 33 | 467 | 38.2% | 34.7% | 89.7% | 2.8 | 3.1 | 0.7 | 0.1 | 14.2 |
| 2010-11 | Northern Iowa | 33 | 506 | 41.2% | 32.8% | 91.0% | 3.5 | 3.1 | 1.0 | 0.0 | 15.3 |
| 2011-12 | Medical redshirt | | | | | | | | | | |
| 2012-13 | Northern Iowa | **34** | **662** | **41.6%** | **37.9%** | **95.5%** | **5.1** | 4.1 | **1.1** | 0.1 | **19.5** |
| Career | | 136 | 2081 | 40.1% | 34.1% | 92.0% | 3.8 | 3.6 | 0.9 | 0.1 | 15.3 |

== Professional basketball career ==
Kalin next played two seasons of professional basketball in Israel. She played her first season for the Ramat Hasharon professional club in the Israel D-1 league in 2013–14, alongside Laine Selwyn and Megan Frazee. She became an Israeli citizen, establishing dual citizenship. She then moved to the Maccabi Ramat Gan club in the Israel D-1 league for her final season, playing for it in 2014–15.

== International ==
She played basketball for Team USA in the 2013 Maccabiah Games. Kalin led the team with a 14.3 points per game average, and the team won the gold medal.

Kalin was a member of the Israel women's national basketball team in 2014 during the qualifying tournament for the 2015 European Women Championship.

== Honors ==
Kalin was inducted into the National Jewish Sports Hall of Fame in 2013 and the Iowa Girls High School Athletic Union Hall of Fame in 2014. In 2017, she was inducted into the UNI Panthers Hall of Fame. That year she was also named to the Missouri Valley Conference Women's Basketball 25-Year Team.

== Basketball administration career ==
In July 2015, she became the Coordinator of Women's Basketball Operations for the Drake University women's program, followed by a season as Assistant Women's Basketball Coach for the 2015–16 Drake Bulldogs women's basketball team.

She worked for Herzl Camp from 2018 to 2022 in Webster, Wisconsin, as their staff development coordinator.
