= 2015–16 Southern Illinois Salukis women's basketball team =

Intercollegiate basketball season

2015–16 Southern Illinois Salukis women's basketball
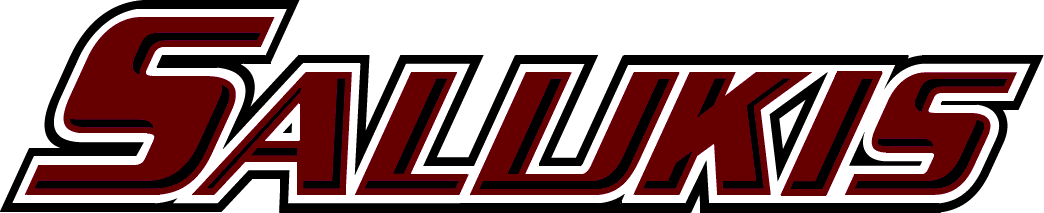

WBI, First Round
- Conference: Missouri Valley Conference
- Record: 20–13 (12–6 The Valley)
- Head coach: Cindy Stein (3rd season)
- Assistant coaches: Andrea Gorski; Kat Martin; Christelle N'Garsanet
- Home arena: SIU Arena

2015–16 Missouri Valley Conference women's basketball standings
	Conf.				Overall
Team	W		L	PCT	W		L	PCT
Northern Iowa	15	–	3	.833	24	–	11	.686
Missouri State †	14	–	4	.778	24	–	10	.706
Drake	14	–	4	.778	23	–	10	.697
Southern Illinois	12	–	6	.667	20	–	13	.606
Loyola-Chicago	10	–	8	.556	14	–	16	.467
Indiana State	9	–	9	.500	13	–	17	.433
Illinois State	6	–	12	.333	8	–	22	.267
Wichita State	5	–	13	.278	8	–	22	.267
Bradley	4	–	14	.222	9	–	22	.290
Evansville	1	–	17	.056	3	–	28	.097
† 2016 MVC tournament winner As of March 24, 2016; Rankings from AP poll

The 2015–16 Southern Illinois women's basketball team represented Southern Illinois University Carbondale during the 2015–16 NCAA Division I women's basketball season. The Salukis, led by third year head coach Cindy Stein. They played their home games at SIU Arena and were members of the Missouri Valley Conference. They finished the season 20–13, 12–6 in MVC play to finish in fourth place. They advanced to the semifinals of the Missouri Valley women's tournament, where they lost to Southern Illinois. They were invited to the Women's Basketball Invitational, where they lost to Western Illinois in the first round.

== Roster ==
2015–16 Southern Illinois Salukis women's basketball team
Players
Coaches

Pos.	#	Name	Height	Year	Previous school	Hometown
F/C	0	Dyana Pierre	6 ft 2 in (1.88 m)	Sr	Lincoln Park Academy	Port St. Lucie, FL
G	2	Blair Stephenson	5 ft 7 in (1.7 m)	Sr	Cardinal Ritter; Lake Land College	St. Louis, MO
G	3	Olivia Bowling	5 ft 9 in (1.75 m)	Fr	Elizabethtown	New Haven, KY
G	10	Cartaesha Macklin	5 ft 6 in (1.68 m)	RS Sr	Lafayette	Mayo, FL
G	13	Rishonda Napier	5 ft 5 in (1.65 m)	RS Jr	Bellarmine-Jefferson	Burbank, CA
G/F	22	Tiajaney Hawkins	5 ft 10 in (1.78 m)	Fr	Central	East Chicago, IN
F	24	Kim Nebo	6 ft 1 in (1.85 m)	Jr	Hilliard Bradley	Hilliard, OH
G	32	Kylie Giebelhausen	6 ft 1 in (1.85 m)	So	East Peoria	East Peoria, IL
F	33	Azia Washington	6 ft 0 in (1.83 m)	Sr	Blue Springs	Lee's Summit, MO
F/C	35	Celina VanHyfte	6 ft 0 in (1.83 m)	So	Annawan	Annawa, IL
G/F	40	Carlie Corrigan	5 ft 11 in (1.8 m)	Jr	Plainfield North	Planfield, IL
F/C	42	Ashley Hummel	6 ft 1 in (1.85 m)	Fr	Hilliard Bradley	Hilliard, OH

Head coach

- Cindy Stein (Illinois)

Assistant coach(es)

- Andrea Gorski (Bradley)
- Kat Martin (Trinity International)
- Christelle N'Garsanet (Missouri)

Legend

- (C) Team captain
- (S) Suspended
- (I) Ineligible
- (W) Walk-on
- Injured
- Current redshirt

Roster

== Schedule ==
Date time, TV	Rank^{#}	Opponent^{#}	Result	Record	Site (attendance) city, state
Exhibition
10/30/2015*; 6:00 pm		Maryville	W 66–60		SIU Arena (571); Carbondale, IL
11/07/2015*; 2:00 pm		Kentucky Wesleyan	W 96–64		SIU Arena (519); Carbondale, IL
Non-conference regular season
11/13/2015*; 7:00 pm		at DePaul; Preseason WNIT first round	L 61–105	0–1	Phillips-McGrath Arena (2,753); Chicago, IL
11/20/2015*; 6:30 pm		Siena; Preseason WNIT consolation round	W 73–54	1–1	SIU Arena (305); Carbondale, IL
11/21/2015*; 6:30 pm		Tennessee State; Preseason WNIT consolation round	W 79–70 ^{OT}	2–1	SIU Arena (231); Carbondale, IL
11/25/2015*; 6:00 pm, ESPN3		Tennessee–Martin	L 63–70	2–2	SIU Arena (516); Carbondale, IL
11/29/2015*; 2:00 pm		at Memphis	L 58–61	2–3	Elma Roane Fieldhouse (472); Memphis, TN
12/02/2015*; 6:00 pm		at Murray State	W 70–57	3–3	CFSB Center (190); Murray, KY
12/04/2015*; 12:00 pm, ESPN3		SIU Edwardsville	W 71–57	4–3	SIU Arena (1,578); Carbondale, IL
12/08/2015*; 7:00 pm		at Illinois	L 64–78	4–4	State Farm Center (1,317); Champaign, IL
12/12/2015*; 3:00 pm, ESPN3		Morehead State	W 102–69	5–4	SIU Arena (800); Carbondale, IL
12/19/2015*; 1:00 pm, ESPN3		at Mercer	W 55–52	6–4	Hawkins Arena (446); Macon, GA
12/22/2015*; 12:00 pm		at Southeast Missouri State	W 87–72	7–4	Show Me Center (830); Cape Girardeau, MO
12/28/2015*; 2:00 pm, ESPN3		Marshall	L 55–64	7–5	SIU Arena (400); Carbondale, IL
Missouri Valley regular season
01/01/2016; 2:00 pm, ESPN3		at Drake	W 77–67	8–5 (1–0)	Knapp Center (2,024); Des Moines, IA
01/03/2016; 2:00 pm, ESPN3		at Northern Iowa	W 65–60	9–5 (2–0)	McLeod Center (1,282); Cedar Falls, IA
01/08/2016; 6:00 pm, ESPN3		Bradley	W 75–49	10–5 (3–0)	SIU Arena (593); Carbondale, IL
01/10/2016; 2:00 pm, ESPN3		Loyola-Chicago	L 68–69 ^{OT}	10–6 (3–1)	SIU Arena (619); Carbondale, IL
01/16/2016; 2:00 pm, ESPN3		Evansville	W 74–56	11–6 (4–1)	SIU Arena (729); Carbondale, IL
01/22/2016; 7:00 pm, ESPN3		at Wichita State	L 48–57	11–7 (4–2)	Charles Koch Arena (1,783); Wichita, KS
01/24/2016; 7:00 pm, ESPN3		at Missouri State	L 77–82	11–8 (4–3)	JQH Arena (3,184); Springfield, MO
01/29/2016; 6:00 pm, ESPN3		Indiana State	W 76–64	12–8 (5–3)	SIU Arena (619); Carbondale, IL
01/31/2016; 2:00 pm, ESPN3		Illinois State	W 76–71	13–8 (6–3)	SIU Arena (789); Carbondale, IL
02/05/2016; 7:00 pm, ESPN3		at Loyola-Chicago	L 59–83	13–9 (6–4)	Joseph J. Gentile Arena (437); Chicago, IL
02/07/2016; 2:00 pm, ESPN3		at Bradley	W 65–51	14–9 (7–4)	Renaissance Coliseum (676); Peoria, IL
02/14/2016; 1:00 pm, ESPN3		at Evansville	W 66–63	15–9 (8–4)	Ford Center (456); Evansville, IN
02/19/2016; 7:00 pm, ESPN3		Missouri State	W 69–61	16–9 (9–4)	SIU Arena (754); Carbondale, IL
02/21/2016; 2:00 pm, ESPN3		Wichita State	W 80–66	17–9 (10–4)	SIU Arena (616); Carbondale, IL
02/25/2016; 7:30 pm, ESPN3		at Illinois State	W 68–55	18–9 (11–4)	Redbird Arena (572); Normal, IL
02/28/2016; 2:00 pm, ESPN3		Indiana State	W 62–58	19–9 (12–4)	Hulman Center (1,895); Terre Haute, IN
03/03/2016; 6:00 pm, ESPN3		Northern Iowa	L 64–73	19–10 (12–5)	SIU Arena (594); Carbondale, IL
03/05/2016; 2:00 pm, ESPN3		Drake	L 64–71	19–11 (12–6)	SIU Arena (639); Carbondale, IL
Missouri Valley Women's Tournament
03/11/2016; 2:30 pm, ESPN3		vs. Loyola-Chicago; Quarterfinals	W 73–64	20–11	iWireless Center; Moline, IL
03/12/2016; 1:30 pm, ESPN3		vs. Southern Illinois; Semifinals	L 43–67	20–12	iWireless Center; Moline, IL
WBI
03/17/2016*; 7:00 pm		at Western Illinois; First Round	L 97–99 ^{OT}	20–13	Western Hall (694); Macomb, IL
*Non-conference game. ^{#}Rankings from AP Poll. (#) Tournament seedings in parentheses. All times are in Central Time.

== See also ==
2015–16 Southern Illinois Salukis men's basketball team
