= 2015–16 Loyola Ramblers women's basketball team =

Intercollegiate basketball season

2015–16 Loyola Ramblers women's basketball
- Conference: Missouri Valley Conference
- Record: 14–16 (10–8 The Valley)
- Head coach: Sheryl Swoopes (3rd season)
- Assistant coaches: Jeanine Wasielewski; Mahogany Green; Kesha Watson
- Home arena: Joseph J. Gentile Arena

2015–16 Missouri Valley Conference women's basketball standings
	Conf.				Overall
Team	W		L	PCT	W		L	PCT
Northern Iowa	15	–	3	.833	24	–	11	.686
Missouri State †	14	–	4	.778	24	–	10	.706
Drake	14	–	4	.778	23	–	10	.697
Southern Illinois	12	–	6	.667	20	–	13	.606
Loyola-Chicago	10	–	8	.556	14	–	16	.467
Indiana State	9	–	9	.500	13	–	17	.433
Illinois State	6	–	12	.333	8	–	22	.267
Wichita State	5	–	13	.278	8	–	22	.267
Bradley	4	–	14	.222	9	–	22	.290
Evansville	1	–	17	.056	3	–	28	.097
† 2016 MVC tournament winner As of March 24, 2016; Rankings from AP poll

The 2015–16 Loyola Ramblers women's basketball team represented Loyola University Chicago during the 2015–16 NCAA Division I women's basketball season. The Ramblers, led by third year head coach Sheryl Swoopes, played their home games at the Joseph J. Gentile Arena and were members of the Missouri Valley Conference. They finished the season 14–16, 10–8 in MVC play to finish in fifth place. They lost in the quarterfinals of the Missouri Valley women's tournament to Southern Illinois.

== Roster ==
2015–16 Loyola Ramblers women's basketball team
Players
Coaches

Pos.	#	Name	Height	Year	Previous school	Hometown
F	1	Whisper Fisher	6 ft 2 in (1.88 m)	Fr	Owings Mills	Owings Mills, MD
G	2	Sam Lambringtsen	5 ft 5 in (1.65 m)	So	Oregon	Oregon, IL
G	3	Tashawnya Edwards	5 ft 5 in (1.65 m)	So	Midwest City; Garden City CC	Midwest City, OK
G/F	4	Dakota Vann	5 ft 11 in (1.8 m)	Fr	Deek Creek	Oklahoma City, OK
G/F	11	Brandi Segars	5 ft 11 in (1.8 m)	Fr	Mount Zion Christian Academy	Queens, NY
G/F	12	Citiana Negatu	5 ft 9 in (1.75 m)	Fr	Blake	Silver Spring, MD
G/F	13	Katie Salmon	6 ft 1 in (1.85 m)	So	Wauwatosa East	Wauwatosa, WI
G	15	Grance Goodhart	5 ft 9 in (1.75 m)	Fr	Sunnyvale	Sunnyvale, TX
F	21	Ryaen Johnson	6 ft 2 in (1.88 m)	So	Bolingbrook	Lisle, IL
G	23	Becca Smith	5 ft 8 in (1.73 m)	Sr	South Elgin	South Elgin, IL
G	25	Taylor Johnson	5 ft 7 in (1.7 m)	RS Jr	Lincoln-Way East	Frankfort, IL
F	44	Nieka Wheeler	5 ft 9 in (1.75 m)	Jr	William Chrisman; Johnson County CC	Independence, MO
F	50	Taylor Manuel	6 ft 2 in (1.88 m)	RS Jr	Incarnate Word Academy; Purdue	St. Louis, MO

Head coach

- Sheryl Swoopes (Texas Tech)

Assistant coach(es)

- Jeanine Wasielewski (Northwestern)
- Mahogany Green (Cleveland State)
- Kesha Watson (Oklahoma City)

Legend

- (C) Team captain
- (S) Suspended
- (I) Ineligible
- (W) Walk-on
- Injured
- Current redshirt

Roster

== Schedule ==
Date time, TV	Rank^{#}	Opponent^{#}	Result	Record	Site (attendance) city, state
Exhibition
11/01/2015*; 3:00 pm		UW–Parkside	W 65–54		Joseph J. Gentile Arena; Chicago, IL
11/04/2015*; 7:00 pm		Lewis	W 79–73 ^{OT}		Joseph J. Gentile Arena; Chicago, IL
Non-conference regular season
11/13/2015*; 4:30 pm		at Georgia Tech	L 77–84	0–1	Hank McCamish Pavilion (1,156); Atlanta, GA
11/17/2015*; 6:00 pm		at Eastern Illinois	W 86–75 ^{OT}	1–1	Lantz Arena (379); Charleston, IL
11/21/2015*; 6:00 pm, ESPN3		Miami (FL)	L 50–77	1–2	Joseph J. Gentile Arena (221); Chicago, IL
11/25/2015*; 6:00 pm, ESPN3		Central Michigan	L 59–68	1–3	Joseph J. Gentile Arena (204); Chicago, IL
11/28/2015*; 3:00 pm, ESPN3		Lamar	W 82–71	2–3	Joseph J. Gentile Arena; Chicago, IL
12/02/2015*; 7:00 pm, ESPN3		Western Michigan	L 45–68	2–4	Joseph J. Gentile Arena (203); Chicago, IL
12/06/2015*; 1:00 pm		at No. 19 Michigan State	L 47–76	2–5	Breslin Center (5,706); East Lansing, MI
12/13/2015*; 2:00 pm, ESPN3		No. 12 Northwestern	L 72–81	2–6	Joseph J. Gentile Arena (411); Chicago, IL
12/16/2015*; 7:00 pm, ESPN3		at Green Bay	L 51–65	2–7	Kress Events Center (1,960); Green Bay, WI
12/21/2015*; 12:00 pm		at No. 17 DePaul	W 88–75	3–7	McGrath-Phillips Arena (2,153); Chicago, IL
12/28/2015*; 7:00 pm		at Rice	W 57–50	4–7	Tudor Fieldhouse (541); Houston, TX
Missouri Valley regular season
01/03/2015; 6:00 pm, ESPN3		at Bradley	W 67–54	5–7 (1–0)	Renaissance Coliseum (572); Peoria, IL
01/08/2015; 7:00 pm, ESPN3		at Evansville	W 63–49	6–7 (2–0)	Ford Center (480); Evansville, IN
01/10/2015; 2:00 pm, ESPN3		at Southern Illinois	W 69–68 ^{OT}	7–7 (3–0)	SIU Arena (619); Carbondale, IL
01/15/2015; 7:00 pm, ESPN3		Wichita State	W 60–55	8–7 (4–0)	Joseph J. Gentile Arena (312); Chicago, IL
01/17/2015; 2:00 pm, ESPN3		Missouri State	L 62–73	8–8 (4–1)	Joseph J. Gentile Arena (412); Chicago, IL
01/22/2015; 6:05 pm, ESPN3		at Indiana State	L 48–62	8–9 (4–2)	Hulman Center (1,735); Terre Haute, IN
01/24/2015; 2:05 pm, ESPN3		at Illinois State	W 57–41	9–9 (5–2)	Redbird Arena (1,313); Normal, IL
01/29/2015; 7:00 pm, ESPN3		Northern Iowa	W 64–60	10–9 (6–2)	Joseph J. Gentile Arena (426); Chicago, IL
01/31/2015; 2:00 pm, ESPN3		Drake	L 65–81	10–10 (6–3)	Joseph J. Gentile Arena (417); Chicago, IL
02/05/2015; 7:00 pm, ESPN3		Southern Illinois	W 83–59	11–10 (7–3)	Joseph J. Gentile Arena (437); Chicago, IL
02/07/2015; 2:00 pm, ESPN3		Evansville	W 67–54	12–10 (8–3)	Joseph J. Gentile Arena (469); Chicago, IL
02/12/2015; 7:05 pm, ESPN3		at Missouri State	L 81–91 ^{OT}	12–11 (8–4)	JQH Arena (3,823); Springfield, MO
02/14/2015; 2:00 pm, ESPN3		at Wichita State	L 62–65	12–12 (8–5)	Charles Koch Arena (1,634); Wichita, KS
02/19/2015; 7:00 pm, ESPN3		Illinois State	W 73–61	13–12 (9–5)	Joseph J. Gentile Arena (536); Chicago, IL
02/21/2015; 2:00 pm, ESPN3		Indiana State	L 71–74	13–13 (9–6)	Joseph J. Gentile Arena (373); Chicago, IL
02/26/2015; 7:00 pm, ESPN3		at Drake	L 61–91	13–14 (9–7)	Knapp Center (2,834); Chicago, IL
02/28/2015; 2:00 pm, ESPN3		at Northern Iowa	L 52–63	13–15 (9–8)	McLeod Center (1,942); Cedar Falls, IA
03/05/2015; 3:00 pm, ESPN3		Bradley	W 69–63	14–15 (10–8)	Joseph J. Gentile Arena; Chicago, IL
Missouri Valley Women's Tournament
03/11/2016; 2:30 pm, ESPN3		vs. Southern Illinois; Quarterfinals	L 64–73	14–16	iWireless Center; Moline, IL
*Non-conference game. ^{#}Rankings from Coaches' Poll. (#) Tournament seedings in parentheses. All times are in Central Time.

== See also ==
2015–16 Loyola Ramblers men's basketball team
