= Oties Epps =

American basketball coach

Oties Epps (born October 26, 1978) was the head coach of the women's basketball program at the University of Evansville. He was previously an assistant coach with the Wisconsin Badgers women's basketball team.

== Biography ==
A native of Highland Park, Michigan, Epps is married with three children. He attended Mount Senario College and the University of Wisconsin–Stout.

== Career ==
Epps' first coaching experience was as an assistant coach on the men's basketball team at the University of Wisconsin–Stout from 2001 to 2004. From there he became an assistant coach with the Cleveland State Vikings women's basketball team. He joined the Badgers in 2008.
