= 2015–16 Duke Blue Devils women's basketball team =

Intercollegiate basketball season

2015–16 Duke Blue Devils women's basketball

Cancún Challenge Mayan Division champion
- Conference: Atlantic Coast Conference
- Record: 20–12 (8–8 ACC)
- Head coach: Joanne P. McCallie (9th season)
- Assistant coaches: Al Brown; Rene Haynes; Hernando Planells
- Home arena: Cameron Indoor Stadium

2015–16 ACC women's basketball standings
	Conf.				Overall
Team	W		L	PCT	W		L	PCT
No. 2 Notre Dame †	16	–	0	1.000	33	–	2	.943
No. 8 Louisville	15	–	1	.938	26	–	8	.765
No. 14 Syracuse	13	–	3	.813	30	–	8	.789
No. 17 Florida State	13	–	3	.813	25	–	8	.758
No. 19 Miami (FL)	10	–	6	.625	24	–	9	.727
NC State	10	–	6	.625	20	–	11	.645
Duke	8	–	8	.500	20	–	12	.625
Georgia Tech	8	–	8	.500	20	–	13	.606
Virginia	6	–	10	.375	18	–	16	.529
Wake Forest	6	–	10	.375	17	–	16	.515
Virginia Tech	5	–	11	.313	18	–	14	.563
North Carolina	4	–	12	.250	14	–	18	.438
Pittsburgh	4	–	12	.250	13	–	18	.419
Boston College	2	–	14	.125	15	–	16	.484
Clemson	0	–	16	.000	4	–	26	.133
† 2016 ACC tournament winner As of April 5, 2016; Rankings from AP poll

The 2015–16 Duke Blue Devils women's basketball team represented Duke University during the 2015–16 NCAA Division I women's basketball season. Returning as head coach was Joanne P. McCallie entering her 9th season. The team played its home games at Cameron Indoor Stadium in Durham, North Carolina as members of the Atlantic Coast Conference. They finished the season 20–12, 8–8 in ACC play, to finish in a tie for seventh place. They advanced to the quarterfinals of the ACC women's tournament to Notre Dame. They missed the NCAA tournament for the first time since 1994 and they were also not invited to the Women's National Invitation Tournament for the first time in 21 years due to a limited roster.

== 2015–16 media ==
All Blue Devils games aired on the Blue Devil IMG Sports Network. WDNC once again acted as the main station for the Blue Devils IMG Sports Network games with Steve Barnes providing the play-by-play and Morgan Patrick acting as analyst.

== Roster ==
2015–16 Duke Blue Devils women's basketball team
Players
Coaches

Pos.	#	Name	Height	Year	Previous school	Hometown
G	2	Haley Gorecki	6 ft 0 in (1.83 m)	Fr	William Fremd	Palatine, IL
G	3	Ángela Salvadores	5 ft 10 in (1.78 m)	Fr	Marista San Jose	León, Spain
G	4	Lexie Brown (I) (redshirt)	5 ft 9 in (1.75 m)	Jr	North Gwinnett; Maryland	Suwanee, GA
G/F	11	Azurá Stevens	6 ft 6 in (1.98 m)	So	Cary	Raleigh, NC
G	12	Mercedes Riggs	5 ft 7 in (1.7 m)	Sr	Timpanogos; Salt Lake CC	Lindon, UT
G	13	Crystal Primm	5 ft 11 in (1.8 m)	Fr	Oxbridge Academy	West Palm Beach, FL
G/F	14	Faith Suggs	6 ft 1 in (1.85 m)	Fr	Homewood Flossmoor	Flossmoor, IL
G	15	Kyra Lambert	5 ft 9 in (1.75 m)	Fr	Samuel Clemens	Cibolo, TX
F/C	21	Kendall Cooper	6 ft 4 in (1.93 m)	Jr	St. Anthony	Carson, CA
F	22	Oderah Chidom	6 ft 4 in (1.93 m)	Jr	Bishop O'Dowd	Oakland, CA
G	23	Rebecca Greenwell	6 ft 1 in (1.85 m)	RS So	Owensboro Catholic	Owensboro, KY
F/C	30	Amber Henson	6 ft 4 in (1.93 m)	RS Sr	Walter L. Sickles	Tampa, FL
F/C	34	Lyneé Belton	6 ft 3 in (1.91 m)	RS Fr	The Bullis School	Clinton, MD
F/C	35	Erin Mathias	6 ft 4 in (1.93 m)	So	Fox Chapel Area	Pittsburgh, PA

Head coach

- Joanne P. McCallie (Northwestern)

Assistant coach(es)

- Al Brown (Purdue)
- Rene Haynes (Michigan State)
- Hernando Planells (Regis)

Legend

- (C) Team captain
- (S) Suspended
- (I) Ineligible
- (W) Walk-on
- Injured
- Current redshirt

Roster

== Schedule ==
Date time, TV	Rank^{#}	Opponent^{#}	Result	Record	High points	High rebounds	High assists	Site (attendance) city, state
Exhibition
11/05/2015*; 7:00 pm	No. 14	Pfeiffer	W 113–36	–	29 – Stevens	9 – Stevens	8 – Lambert	Cameron Indoor Stadium; Durham, NC
11/08/2015*; 1:00 pm	No. 14	Saint Leo	W 116–33	–	26 – Greenwell	11 – Tied	6 – Lambert	Cameron Indoor Stadium; Durham, NC
Non-conference regular season
11/13/2015*; 8:00 pm, ESPN3	No. 14	at Penn	W 59–50	1–0	15 – Stevens	9 – Chidom	3 – Lambert	The Palestra (2,587); Philadelphia, PA
11/15/2015*; 6:00 pm	No. 14	Winthrop	W 78–50	2–0	18 – Stevens	14 – Stevens	4 – Tied	Cameron Indoor Stadium (3,582); Durham, NC
11/18/2015*; 7:00 pm, ESPN3	No. 14	No. 12 Texas A&M	L 66–72 ^{OT}	2–1	22 – Greenwell	16 – Stevens	4 – Lambert	Cameron Indoor Stadium (3,708); Durham, NC
11/22/2015*; 2:00 pm	No. 14	Army	W 72–61	3–1	32 – Stevens	14 – Stevens	5 – Salvadores	Cameron Indoor Stadium (6,147); Durham, NC
11/26/2015*; 1:30 pm	No. 15	vs. Idaho; Cancún Challenge Mayan Division	W 74–68	4–1	22 – Stevens	12 – Stevens	6 – Salvadores	Hard Rock Hotel Riviera Maya (133); Cancún, Mexico
11/27/2015*; 1:30 pm	No. 15	vs. Iowa State; Cancún Challenge Mayan Division	W 86–48	5–1	15 – Greenwell	11 – Chidom	5 – Gorecki	Hard Rock Hotel Riviera Maya (133); Cancún, Mexico
11/28/2015*; 1:30 pm	No. 15	vs. Texas State; Cancún Challenge Mayan Division	W 85–34	6–1	19 – Stevens	7 – Greenwell	9 – Salvadores	Hard Rock Hotel Riviera Maya (133); Cancún, Mexico
12/03/2015*; 7:00 pm, ESPN3	No. 14	Minnesota; ACC–Big Ten Women's Challenge	W 84–64	7–1	26 – Stevens	11 – Stevens	8 – Salvadores	Cameron Indoor Stadium (3,617); Durham, NC
12/06/2015*; 7:00 pm, ESPN2	No. 14	at No. 2 South Carolina	L 55–66	7–2	16 – Lambert	9 – Stevens	2 – 3 tied	Colonial Life Arena (16,429); Columbia, SC
12/14/2015*; 7:00 pm	No. 13	Massachusetts	W 70–46	8–2	24 – Stevens	10 – Stevens	5 – Greenwell	Cameron Indoor Stadium (3,602); Durham, NC
12/17/2015*; 7:00 pm	No. 13	Liberty	W 79–41	9–2	26 – Greenwell	8 – Greenwell	8 – Salvadores	Cameron Indoor Stadium (4,003); Durham, NC
12/20/2015*; 7:00 pm, SECN	No. 13	at No. 8 Kentucky	L 61–71	9–3	17 – Stevens	7 – Chidom	2 – 3 tied	Rupp Arena (17,150); Lexington, KY
12/29/2015*; 7:00 pm	No. 12	Western Carolina	W 84–47	10–3	21 – Stevens	10 – Stevens	4 – Lambert	Cameron Indoor Stadium (4,023); Durham, NC
12/31/2015*; 2:00 pm	No. 12	UNC Wilmington	W 78–56	11–3	23 – Greenwell	9 – Greenwell	6 – Salvadores	Cameron Indoor Stadium (3,844); Durham, NC
ACC Regular Season
01/03/2016; 1:00 pm, ESPNU	No. 12	at Syracuse	L 50–86	11–4 (0–1)	12 – Stevens	12 – Stevens	4 – Lambert	Carrier Dome (1,585); Syracuse, NY
01/07/2016; 7:00 pm, ESPN3	No. 18	Wake Forest	W 95–68	12–4 (1–1)	23 – Stevens	9 – Greenwell	5 – Salvadores	Cameron Indoor Stadium (3,937); Durham, NC
01/10/2016; 1:00 pm, ESPN3	No. 18	at Louisville	L 48–65	12–5 (1–2)	14 – Greenwell	11 – Chidom	3 – Salvadores	KFC Yum! Center (11,342); Louisville, KY
01/14/2016; 7:00 pm, RSN	No. 22	NC State	L 62–65	12–6 (1–3)	21 – Stevens	11 – Stevens	2 – 3 tied	Cameron Indoor Stadium (4,830); Durham, NC
01/17/2016; 2:00 pm, ESPN3	No. 22	Boston College	W 71–51	13–6 (2–3)	23 – Greenwell	14 – Stevens	7 – Lambert	Cameron Indoor Stadium (3,983); Durham, NC
01/21/2016; 7:00 pm, ESPN3		at Clemson	W 72–43	14–6 (3–3)	33 – Stevens	7 – Stevens	4 – Tied	Jervey Athletic Center (494); Clemson, SC
01/24/2016; 3:00 pm, RSN		North Carolina	W 71–55	15–6 (4–3)	26 – Stevens	16 – Henson	4 – Lambert	Cameron Indoor Stadium (7,622); Durham, NC
01/28/2016; 7:00 pm, RSN		at Pittsburgh	W 70–48	16–6 (5–3)	26 – Stevens	9 – Stevens	4 – Tied	Peterson Events Center (1,204); Pittsburgh, PA
02/01/2016; 6:00 pm, ESPN2		No. 3 Notre Dame	L 61–68	16–7 (5–4)	14 – Stevens	9 – Tied	3 – Henson	Cameron Indoor Stadium (5,159); Durham, NC
02/04/2016; 7:00 pm, ESPN3		Virginia	W 67–52	17–7 (6–4)	25 – Greenwell	12 – Greenwell	4 – Tied	Cameron Indoor Stadium (4,506); Durham, NC
02/07/2016; 1:00 pm, RSN		at No. 16 Miami (FL)	L 53–61	17–8 (6–5)	18 – Chidom	7 – Greenwell	3 – Salvadores	BankUnited Center (1,293); Coral Gables, FL
02/11/2016; 7:00 pm, ESPN3		No. 10 Florida State	L 53–69	17–9 (6–6)	13 – Salvadores	7 – Salvadores	1 – 6 tied	Cameron Indoor Stadium (4,536); Durham, NC
02/14/2016; 2:00 pm, ESPN3		at Wake Forest	L 58–64	17–10 (6–7)	18 – Chidom	8 – Suggs	6 – Salvadores	LJVM Coliseum (1,458); Winston-Salem, NC
02/18/2016; 7:00 pm, ESPN3		at Virginia Tech	W 66–62	18–10 (7–7)	16 – Chidom	11 – Chidom	4 – Tied	Cassell Coliseum (1,264); Blacksburg, VA
02/21/2016; 2:00 pm		Georgia Tech	L 59–64	18–11 (7–8)	19 – Salvadores	9 – Henson	3 – Henson	Cameron Indoor Stadium (4,845); Durham, NC
02/28/2016; 3:00 pm, ESPN3		at North Carolina	W 93–57	19–11 (8–8)	27 – Greenwell	10 – Tied	7 – Lanbert	Carmichael Arena (4,762); Durham, NC
ACC Women's Tournament
03/03/2016; 2:00 pm, RSN		vs. Virginia; Second Round	W 57–53	20–11	20 – Chidom	15 – Stevens	3 – Salvadores	Greensboro Coliseum (2,114); Greensboro, NC
03/04/2016; 2:00 pm, RSN		vs. No. 2 Notre Dame; Quarterfinals	L 54–83	20–12	19 – Stevens	10 – Stevens	3 – Salvadores	Greensboro Coliseum (3,148); Greensboro, NC
*Non-conference game. ^{#}Rankings from AP Poll,. (#) Tournament seedings in parentheses. All times are in Eastern Time.

== Rankings ==
2015–16 NCAA Division I women's basketball rankings

Regular season polls
Poll	Pre- Season	Week 2	Week 3	Week 4	Week 5	Week 6	Week 7	Week 8	Week 9	Week 10	Week 11	Week 12	Week 13	Week 14	Week 15	Week 16	Week 17	Week 18	Week 19	Final
AP	14	14	15	14	13	13	13	12	18	22	RV	RV	RV	NR	NR	NR	NR	NR	NR	N/A
Coaches	12	9	12	13	11	11	12	12	16	19	RV	RV	RV	RV	NR	NR	NR	RV	RV	NR

Legend
	Increase in ranking
	Decrease in ranking
	Not ranked previous week
(RV)	Received Votes

== See also ==
- 2015–16 Duke Blue Devils men's basketball team
