= 2015–16 NC State Wolfpack women's basketball team =

Intercollegiate basketball season

2015–16 NC State Wolfpack women's basketball
- Conference: Atlantic Coast Conference
- Record: 20–11 (10–6 ACC)
- Head coach: Wes Moore (3rd season)
- Assistant coaches: Nikki West; Gene Hill; Lindsay Edmonds
- Home arena: Broughton HS; PNC Arena

2015–16 ACC women's basketball standings
| | Conf. | | | | Overall |
| Team | W | | L | PCT | W | | L | PCT |
|---|---|---|---|---|---|---|---|---|
| No. 2 Notre Dame † | 16 | – | 0 | 1.000 | 33 | – | 2 | .943 |
| No. 8 Louisville | 15 | – | 1 | .938 | 26 | – | 8 | .765 |
| No. 14 Syracuse | 13 | – | 3 | .813 | 30 | – | 8 | .789 |
| No. 17 Florida State | 13 | – | 3 | .813 | 25 | – | 8 | .758 |
| No. 19 Miami (FL) | 10 | – | 6 | .625 | 24 | – | 9 | .727 |
| NC State | 10 | – | 6 | .625 | 20 | – | 11 | .645 |
| Duke | 8 | – | 8 | .500 | 20 | – | 12 | .625 |
| Georgia Tech | 8 | – | 8 | .500 | 20 | – | 13 | .606 |
| Virginia | 6 | – | 10 | .375 | 18 | – | 16 | .529 |
| Wake Forest | 6 | – | 10 | .375 | 17 | – | 16 | .515 |
| Virginia Tech | 5 | – | 11 | .313 | 18 | – | 14 | .563 |
| North Carolina | 4 | – | 12 | .250 | 14 | – | 18 | .438 |
| Pittsburgh | 4 | – | 12 | .250 | 13 | – | 18 | .419 |
| Boston College | 2 | – | 14 | .125 | 15 | – | 16 | .484 |
| Clemson | 0 | – | 16 | .000 | 4 | – | 26 | .133 |
† 2016 ACC tournament winner As of April 5, 2016; Rankings from AP poll

The 2015–16 NC State Wolfpack women's basketball team represented North Carolina State University during the 2015–16 NCAA Division I women's basketball season. The Wolfpack, under third-year head coach Wes Moore, played their home games at Needham B. Broughton High School with two games at PNC Arena due to renovations at Reynolds Coliseum. The team was a member of the Atlantic Coast Conference. They finished the season 20–11, 10–6 in ACC play to finish in sixth place. They advanced to the quarterfinals of the ACC women's tournament to face Syracuse. Despite having 20 wins and being projected as a tournament team, they were not invited to the NCAA tournament. The team voted not to accept an invitation to the WNIT.

== Roster ==
2015–16 NC State Wolfpack women's basketball team
Players
Coaches

| Pos. | # | Name | Height | Year | Previous school | Hometown |
|---|---|---|---|---|---|---|
| G | 0 | Camille Anderson | 5 ft 9 in (1.75 m) | Fr | Buford | Buford, GA |
| G | 2 | Kaila Ealey | 5 ft 8 in (1.73 m) | Fr | Needham Broughton | Raleigh, NC |
| G | 3 | Miah Spencer | 5 ft 8 in (1.73 m) | Jr | Columbia | Decatur, GA |
| G | 4 | Ashley Williams | 5 ft 8 in (1.73 m) | RS Jr | Green Hope | Cary, NC |
| F | 5 | Chelsea Nelson | 6 ft 1 in (1.85 m) | So | John Overton | Antioch, TN |
| G/F | 10 | Ashley Eli | 5 ft 11 in (1.8 m) | Sr | Summit | Mansfield, TX |
| F | 11 | Jennifer Mathurin | 6 ft 1 in (1.85 m) | Jr | Champlain College State Lambert | Montreal, Quebec |
| C | 15 | Sara Boric | 6 ft 5 in (1.96 m) | RS Fr | Tehnicka Skola | Banja Luka, Bosnia |
| G | 21 | DD Rodgers | 6 ft 1 in (1.85 m) | Fr | Myers Park | Charlotte, NC |
| G | 22 | Dominique Wilson | 5 ft 8 in (1.73 m) | RS Jr | McEachern; Arkansas | Powder Springs, GA |
| G | 23 | Amber Richardson | 6 ft 0 in (1.83 m) | Fr | Southeast Raleigh | Garner, NC |
| F | 24 | Lena Niang | 6 ft 2 in (1.88 m) | Fr | Rivedale Baptist | Bowie, MD |
| F/C | 25 | Carlee Schuhmacher | 6 ft 1 in (1.85 m) | Jr | Watertown; Des Moines Area CC | Watertown, WI |
| G | 30 | Kaley Moser | 5 ft 11 in (1.8 m) | Sr | Williams | Burlington, NC |
| C | 32 | Akela Maize | 6 ft 5 in (1.96 m) | So | New Hope Christian Academy | Greensboro, NC |
| C | 44 | Nae Nae Cole | 6 ft 3 in (1.91 m) | Fr | Paul IV | Gainesville, VA |

Head coach

- Wes Moore (NC State)

Assistant coach(es)

- Nikki West (Clemson)
- Gene Hill (Georgia Tech)
- Lindsay Edmonds (Appalachian State)

Legend

- (C) Team captain
- (S) Suspended
- (I) Ineligible
- (W) Walk-on
- Injured
- Current redshirt

Roster

== Media ==
WKNC acts as the home for Wolfpack women's basketball. Patrick Kinas and Rachel Stockdale provide the call for the games. ESPN and the ACC RSN televise select Wolfpack games during the season. All non-televised home conference games are shown on ESPN3, using the radio broadcasters for the call.

== Schedule ==
| Date time, TV | Rank^{#} | Opponent^{#} | Result | Record | Site (attendance) city, state |
Exhibition
| 11/08/2015*; 12:00 pm | | Wingate | W 72–37 | | Broughton HS (566); Raleigh, NC |
Non-conference regular season
| 11/13/2015*; 5:00 pm, ESPN3 | | Villanova | W 70–64 | 1–0 | PNC Arena (1,211); Raleigh, NC |
| 11/15/2015*; 2:00 pm | | High Point | W 89–48 | 2–0 | Broughton HS (1,073); Raleigh, NC |
| 11/17/2015*; 7:00 pm, ESPN3 | | Radford | W 67–52 | 3–0 | PNC Arena (1,003); Raleigh, NC |
| 11/20/2015*; 7:00 pm, ESPN3 | | at Liberty | W 61–53 | 4–0 | Vines Center (1,133); Lynchburg, VA |
| 11/22/2015*; 2:00 pm | | Davidson | W 58–42 | 5–0 | Broughton HS (1,408); Raleigh, NC |
| 11/26/2015*; 6:30 pm | | vs. Seton Hall; Cancún Challenge Riviera Division | L 55–58 | 5–1 | Hard Rock Hotel Riviera Maya (133); Cancún, Mexico |
| 11/27/2015*; 4:00 pm | | vs. UAB; Cancún Challenge Riviera Division | W 67–56 | 6–1 | Hard Rock Hotel Riviera Maya (133); Cancún, Mexico |
| 12/03/2015*; 8:00 pm | | at Nebraska; ACC–Big Ten Women's Challenge | L 67–88 | 6–2 | Pinnacle Bank Arena (5,151); Lincoln, NE |
| 12/06/2015*; 2:00 pm | | Charlotte | W 72–65 | 7–2 | Broughton HS (1,224); Raleigh, NC |
| 12/13/2015*; 2:00 pm | | Elon | L 66–69 | 7–3 | Broughton HS (1,476); Raleigh, NC |
| 12/16/2015*; 7:30 pm | | Western Carolina | W 86–55 | 8–3 | Broughton HS (1,040); Raleigh, NC |
| 12/20/2015*; 12:00 pm | | vs. Eastern Kentucky; Gator Holiday Classic semifinals | W 73–62 | 9–3 | O'Connell Center; Gainesville, FL |
| 12/21/2015*; 2:30 pm | | at Florida; Gator Holiday Classic championship | L 72–79 | 9–4 | O'Connell Center (1,053); Gainesville, FL |
ACC regular season
| 12/30/2015; 7:00 pm, ESPN3 | | at No. 22 Miami (FL) | L 44–73 | 9–5 (0–1) | BankUnited Center (857); Coral Gables, FL |
| 01/03/2016; 2:00 pm | | at Wake Forest | W 64–47 | 10–5 (1–1) | Broughton HS (2,065); Raleigh, NC |
| 01/07/2016; 7:30 pm | | Georgia Tech | W 65–57 | 11–5 (2–1) | Broughton HS (1,052); Raleigh, NC |
| 01/10/2016; 2:00 pm, RSN | | at Pittsburgh | W 78–76 ^{3OT} | 12–5 (3–1) | Peterson Events Center (3,015); Pittsburgh, PA |
| 01/14/2016; 7:00 pm, RSN | | at No. 22 Duke | W 65–62 | 13–5 (4–1) | Cameron Indoor Stadium (4,830); Durham, NC |
| 01/17/2016; 2:00 pm | | No. 23 Louisville | L 90–92 | 13–6 (4–2) | Broughton HS (2,313); Raleigh, NC |
| 01/21/2016; 7:00 pm, RSN | | at Virginia Tech | W 72–61 | 14–6 (5–2) | Cassell Coliseum (1,475); Blacksburg, VA |
| 01/27/2016; 7:30 pm | | Virginia | W 63–52 | 15–6 (6–2) | Broughton HS (1,499); Raleigh, NC |
| 01/31/2016; 2:00 pm | | North Carolina; Carolina–State Game | W 78–49 | 16–6 (7–2) | Broughton HS (2,811); Raleigh, NC |
| 02/04/2016; 7:00 pm, ESPN3 | | at No. 3 Notre Dame | L 46–82 | 16–7 (7–3) | Edmund P. Joyce Center (8,835); South Bend, IN |
| 02/07/2016; 3:00 pm, RSN | | at Wake Forest | L 58–63 | 16–8 (7–4) | LJVM Coliseum (701); Winston-Salem, NC |
| 02/11/2016; 7:30 pm | | Boston College | W 74–63 | 17–8 (8–4) | Broughton HS (1,639); Raleigh, NC |
| 02/14/2016; 2:00 pm | | Syracuse | L 52–55 | 17–9 (8–5) | Broughton HS (2,811); Raleigh, NC |
| 02/21/2016; 1:00 pm, ESPN2 | | at North Carolina; Carolina–State Game | W 80–66 | 18–9 (9–5) | Carmichael Arena (3,872); Chapel Hill, NC |
| 02/25/2016; 7:30 pm | | No. 12 Florida State | L 52–56 | 18–10 (9–6) | Broughton HS (1,656); Raleigh, NC |
| 02/28/2016; 2:00 pm | | at Clemson | W 71–57 | 19–10 (10–6) | Jervey Athletic Center (943); Clemson, SC |
ACC Women's Tournament
| 03/03/2016; 8:00 pm, RSN | | vs. Boston College; Second Round | W 76–60 | 20–10 | Greensboro Coliseum (3,374); Greensboro, NC |
| 03/04/2016; 8:00 pm, RSN | | vs. No. 17 Syracuse; Quarterfinals | L 61–80 | 20–11 | Greensboro Coliseum (5,034); Greensboro, NC |
*Non-conference game. ^{#}Rankings from AP Poll. (#) Tournament seedings in parentheses. All times are in Eastern.

== Rankings ==
Regular season polls
| Poll | Pre- Season | Week 2 | Week 3 | Week 4 | Week 5 | Week 6 | Week 7 | Week 8 | Week 9 | Week 10 | Week 11 | Week 12 | Week 13 | Week 14 | Week 15 | Week 16 | Week 17 | Week 18 | Week 19 | Final |
|---|---|---|---|---|---|---|---|---|---|---|---|---|---|---|---|---|---|---|---|---|
| AP | NR | NR | RV | RV | NR | NR | NR | NR | NR | NR | NR | NR | RV | NR | NR | NR | NR | NR | NR | N/A |
| Coaches | NR | RV | RV | RV | NR | NR | NR | NR | NR | RV | NR | RV | RV | RV | RV | RV | RV | RV | RV | NR |

Legend
| | Increase in ranking |
| | Decrease in ranking |
| | Not ranked previous week |
| (RV) | Received votes |

== See also ==
- 2015–16 NC State Wolfpack men's basketball team
