= 2015–16 Georgia Tech Yellow Jackets women's basketball team =

Intercollegiate basketball season

2015–16 Georgia Tech Yellow Jackets women's basketball

WNIT, Second Round
- Conference: Atlantic Coast Conference
- Record: 20–13 (8–8 ACC)
- Head coach: MaChelle Joseph (13th season)
- Assistant coaches: Kevin Morrison; Rob Norris; M. L. Willis
- Home arena: Hank McCamish Pavilion

2015–16 ACC women's basketball standings
	Conf.				Overall
Team	W		L	PCT	W		L	PCT
No. 2 Notre Dame †	16	–	0	1.000	33	–	2	.943
No. 8 Louisville	15	–	1	.938	26	–	8	.765
No. 14 Syracuse	13	–	3	.813	30	–	8	.789
No. 17 Florida State	13	–	3	.813	25	–	8	.758
No. 19 Miami (FL)	10	–	6	.625	24	–	9	.727
NC State	10	–	6	.625	20	–	11	.645
Duke	8	–	8	.500	20	–	12	.625
Georgia Tech	8	–	8	.500	20	–	13	.606
Virginia	6	–	10	.375	18	–	16	.529
Wake Forest	6	–	10	.375	17	–	16	.515
Virginia Tech	5	–	11	.313	18	–	14	.563
North Carolina	4	–	12	.250	14	–	18	.438
Pittsburgh	4	–	12	.250	13	–	18	.419
Boston College	2	–	14	.125	15	–	16	.484
Clemson	0	–	16	.000	4	–	26	.133
† 2016 ACC tournament winner As of April 5, 2016; Rankings from AP poll

The 2015–16 Georgia Tech Yellow Jackets women's basketball team represented Georgia Institute of Technology during the 2015–16 NCAA Division I women's basketball season. Returning as head coach was MaChelle Joseph entering her 13th season. The team played its home games at Hank McCamish Pavilion in Atlanta, Georgia as members of the Atlantic Coast Conference. They finished the season 20–13, 8–8 in ACC play to finish in a tie for seventh place. They advanced to the quarterfinals of the ACC women's tournament, where they lost to Louisville. They were invited to the Women's National Invitation Tournament, where they defeated Mercer in the first round before losing to Tulane in the second round.

== 2015–16 media ==
All Yellow Jackets games will air on the Yellow Jackets IMG Sports Network. WREK once again serves as the home of the Ramblin Wreck women's basketball team.

== Roster ==
2015–16 Georgia Tech Yellow Jackets women's basketball team
Players
Coaches

Pos.	#	Name	Height	Year	Previous school	Hometown
G	0	Imani Tilford	5 ft 5 in (1.65 m)	So	Woodlands	Greenburgh, NY
G/F	2	Aaliyah Whiteside	6 ft 0 in (1.83 m)	Sr	Memphis Central	Memphis, TN
G	5	Ciani Cryor	5 ft 5 in (1.65 m)	Fr	Neumann-Goretti	Philadelphia, PA
F	10	Katarina Vuckovic	6 ft 3 in (1.91 m)	Jr	Crvena Zvezda	Smederevo, Serbia
F	11	Elo Edeferioka	6 ft 2 in (1.88 m)	Jr	Life Center Academy	Warri, Nigeria
F	13	Erin Garner	6 ft 3 in (1.91 m)	RS Fr	Trenton Catholic Academy	Philadelphia, PA
C	14	Simina Avram	6 ft 3 in (1.91 m)	So	Andre Saguna	Brașov, Romania
C	15	Chelsea Guimaraes	6 ft 3 in (1.91 m)	Fr	Professor José Augusto Lucas	Almada, Portugal
G/F	20	Irene Gari	6 ft 1 in (1.85 m)	RS Sr	Blume; UTEP	Oliva, Spain
F	21	Zaire O'Neil	5 ft 11 in (1.8 m)	So	Malcolm X Shabazz	Newark, NJ
G/F	23	Dejoria Howard	6 ft 0 in (1.83 m)	Fr	Orangeburg-Wilkinson	Orangeburg, SC
G	25	Lilliann Andrews	5 ft 4 in (1.63 m)	Fr	Amos P. Godby	Tallahassee, FL
F	44	Martine Fortune	6 ft 3 in (1.91 m)	Fr	The Shipley School	Philadelphia, PA
F	54	Roddreka Rogers	6 ft 0 in (1.83 m)	Sr	Myers Park	Charlotte, NC
G	55	Antonia Peresson	5 ft 9 in (1.75 m)	So	Liceo Stefanini Yenezia	Pordenone, Italy

Head coach

- MaChelle Joseph (Purdue)

Assistant coach(es)

- Kevin Morrison (Cal Poly)
- Rob Norris (Indiana (PA))
- M. L. Willis (Iowa)

Legend

- (C) Team captain
- (S) Suspended
- (I) Ineligible
- (W) Walk-on
- Injured
- Current redshirt

Roster

== Schedule ==
Date time, TV	Rank^{#}	Opponent^{#}	Result	Record	Site (attendance) city, state
Exhibition
11/02/2015*; 7:00 pm		West Georgia	W 77–35		Hank McCamish Pavilion (454); Atlanta, GA
Non-conference regular season
11/13/2015*; 5:30 pm		Loyola–Chicago	W 84–77	1–0	Hank McCamish Pavilion (1,156); Atlanta, GA
11/15/2015*; 2:00 pm		St. Francis Brooklyn	W 89–51	2–0	Hank McCamish Pavilion (854); Atlanta, GA
11/18/2015*; 7:00 pm		Southeastern Louisiana	W 102–49	3–0	Hank McCamish Pavilion (485); Atlanta, GA
11/22/2015*; 4:00 pm, SECN		at Georgia	L 66–78	3–1	Stegeman Coliseum (4,441); Athens, GA
11/24/2015*; 5:00 pm		Alabama State	W 80–54	4–1	Hank McCamish Pavilion (473); Atlanta, GA
11/26/2015*; 9:00 pm		vs. Northern Iowa; Women's Cancún Challenge Riviera Division	L 58–61	4–2	Hard Rock Hotel Riviera Maya (133); Cancún, Mexico
11/27/2015*; 6:30 pm		vs. High Point; Women's Cancún Challenge Riviera Division	W 81–61	5–2	Hard Rock Hotel Riviera Maya (133); Cancún, Mexico
12/02/2015*; 7:00 pm		at Indiana; ACC–Big Ten Women's Challenge	L 60–69	5–3	Assembly Hall (2,222); Bloomington, IN
12/05/2015*; 2:00 pm		USC Upstate	W 87–46	6–3	Hank McCamish Pavilion (579); Atlanta, GA
12/13/2015*; 2:00 pm		Samford	W 66–55	7–3	Hank McCamish Pavilion (1,008); Atlanta, GA
12/15/2015*; 6:00 pm		Prairie View A&M	W 96–48	8–3	Hank McCamish Pavilion (553); Atlanta, GA
12/18/2015*; 7:00 pm		Alabama	W 70–58	9–3	Hank McCamish Pavilion (1,828); Atlanta, GA
12/20/2015*; 2:00 pm		at IUPUI	W 60–50	10–3	IUPUI Gymnasium (377); Indianapolis, IN
ACC regular season
12/30/2015; 7:00 pm		at No. 3 Notre Dame	L 76–85	10–4 (0–1)	Edmund P. Joyce Center (9,149); South Bend, IN
01/03/2016; 2:00 pm, ESPN3		Louisville	L 65–78	10–5 (0–2)	Hank McCamish Pavilion (1,982); Atlanta, GA
01/07/2016; 7:30 pm		at NC State	L 57–65	10–6 (0–3)	Broughton HS (1,052); Raleigh, NC
01/10/2016; 4:00 pm, RSN		at No. 19 Florida State	L 69–75	10–7 (0–4)	Donald L. Tucker Civic Center (3,906); Tallahassee, FL
01/14/2016; 7:00 pm, ESPN3		North Carolina	W 80–73	11–7 (1–4)	Hank McCamish Pavilion (917); Atlanta, GA
01/17/2016; 2:00 pm, ESPN3		Virginia	L 67–78	11–8 (1–5)	Hank McCamish Pavilion (1,041); Atlanta, GA
01/24/2016; 2:00 pm		at Clemson	W 76–63	12–8 (2–5)	Jervey Athletic Center (821); Clemson, SC
01/28/2016; 7:00 pm, RSN		No. 3 Notre Dame	L 42–54	12–9 (2–6)	Hank McCamish Pavilion (1,908); Atlanta, GA
01/31/2016; 3:00 pm, RSN		Boston College	W 62–56	13–9 (3–6)	Hank McCamish Pavilion (1,003); Atlanta, GA
02/04/2016; 7:00 pm		at Virginia Tech	W 51–34	14–9 (4–6)	Cassell Coliseum (1,818); Blacksburg, VA
02/07/2016; 2:00 pm, ESPN3		at Syracuse	L 52–71	14–10 (4–7)	Carrier Dome (1,490); Syracuse, NY
02/11/2016; 7:00 pm, ESPN3		No. 19 Miami (FL)	L 55–58	14–11 (4–8)	Hank McCamish Pavilion (975); Atlanta, GA
02/14/2016; 2:00 pm		Clemson	W 77–48	15–11 (5–8)	Hank McCamish Pavilion (1,012); Atlanta, GA
02/21/2016; 2:00 pm		at Duke	W 64–59	16–11 (6–8)	Cameron Indoor Stadium (4,845); Durham, NC
02/25/2016; 7:00 pm, ESPN3		at Pittsburgh	W 66–60	17–11 (7–8)	Peterson Events Center (867); Pittsburgh, PA
02/28/2016; 2:00 pm, ESPN3		Wake Forest	W 66–51	18–11 (8–8)	Hank McCamish Pavilion (1,316); Atlanta, GA
ACC Women's Tournament
03/03/2016; 6:00 pm, RSN		vs. Wake Forest; Second Round	W 67–65	19–11	Greensboro Coliseum; Greensboro, NC
03/04/2016; 6:00 pm, RSN		vs. No. 7 Louisville; Quarterfinals	L 50–60	19–12	Greensboro Coliseum; Greensboro, NC
WNIT
03/17/2016*; 7:00 pm		Mercer; First Round	W 73–56	20–12	Hank McCamish Pavilion (1,047); Atlanta, GA
03/21/2016*; 7:00 pm		Tulane; Second Round	L 61–64	20–13	Hank McCamish Pavilion (585); Atlanta, GA
*Non-conference game. ^{#}Rankings from AP Poll,. (#) Tournament seedings in parentheses. All times are in Eastern Time.

== See also ==
- 2015–16 Georgia Tech Yellow Jackets men's basketball team
