= 2015–16 Pittsburgh Panthers women's basketball team =

Intercollegiate basketball season

2015–16 Pittsburgh Panthers women's basketball
- Conference: Atlantic Coast Conference
- Record: 13–18 (4–12 ACC)
- Head coach: Suzie McConnell-Serio (3rd season)
- Assistant coaches: Kathy McConnell-Miller; Carmen Bruce; Lindsay Richards
- Home arena: Petersen Events Center

2015–16 ACC women's basketball standings
	Conf.				Overall
Team	W		L	PCT	W		L	PCT
No. 2 Notre Dame †	16	–	0	1.000	33	–	2	.943
No. 8 Louisville	15	–	1	.938	26	–	8	.765
No. 14 Syracuse	13	–	3	.813	30	–	8	.789
No. 17 Florida State	13	–	3	.813	25	–	8	.758
No. 19 Miami (FL)	10	–	6	.625	24	–	9	.727
NC State	10	–	6	.625	20	–	11	.645
Duke	8	–	8	.500	20	–	12	.625
Georgia Tech	8	–	8	.500	20	–	13	.606
Virginia	6	–	10	.375	18	–	16	.529
Wake Forest	6	–	10	.375	17	–	16	.515
Virginia Tech	5	–	11	.313	18	–	14	.563
North Carolina	4	–	12	.250	14	–	18	.438
Pittsburgh	4	–	12	.250	13	–	18	.419
Boston College	2	–	14	.125	15	–	16	.484
Clemson	0	–	16	.000	4	–	26	.133
† 2016 ACC tournament winner As of April 5, 2016; Rankings from AP poll

The 2015–16 Pittsburgh Panthers women's basketball team represented the University of Pittsburgh during the 2015–16 college basketball season. The Panthers were led by third-year head coach Suzie McConnell-Serio, and played their home games at the Petersen Events Center. They finished the season 13–18, 4–12 in ACC play to finish in a tie for twelfth place. They advanced to the second round of the ACC women's tournament, where they lost to Miami (FL).

== Roster ==
2015–16 Pittsburgh Panthers women's basketball team
Players
Coaches

Pos.	#	Name	Height	Year	Previous school	Hometown
G	2	Aysia Bugg	5 ft 7 in (1.7 m)	So	Bolingbrook	Chicago, IL
G	4	Tania Lamb	5 ft 7 in (1.7 m)	Fr	Long Beach Poly	Los Angeles, CA
F	5	Kauai Bradley	6 ft 0 in (1.83 m)	Fr	Marian Catholic	Chicago, IL
G	10	Cassidy Walsh	5 ft 7 in (1.7 m)	Fr	Seton-La Salle	Pittsburgh, PA
F	12	Yacine Diop	5 ft 10 in (1.78 m)	So	Seton-La Salle	Dakar, Senegal
G	14	Fred Potvin	5 ft 11 in (1.8 m)	Jr	Vanier College	Montreal, QE
G	22	Destinie Gibbs	5 ft 11 in (1.8 m)	RS Jr	McEachern; USC	Oxford, GA
G	25	Brittany Gordon	5 ft 8 in (1.73 m)	RS Jr	South Charleston	South Charleston, WV
F	32	Kalista Walters	6 ft 0 in (1.83 m)	Fr	Bethlehem Catholic	Fleetwood, PA
F	35	Stasha Carey	6 ft 2 in (1.88 m)	Fr	Berea-Midpark	Cleveland, OH
C	44	Bubbles Anderson	6 ft 11 in (2.11 m)	RS Jr	Rutgers Prep	Clarendon, Jamaica
G/F	50	Brenna Wise	6 ft 11 in (2.11 m)	Fr	Vincentian Academy	Pittsburgh, PA

Head coach

Suzie McConnell-Serio (Penn State)

Assistant coach(es)

Kathy McConnell-Miller (Virginia)
Carmen Bruce (Duquesne)
Lindsay Richards (Iowa)

Legend

- (C) Team captain
- (S) Suspended
- (I) Ineligible
- (W) Walk-on
- Injured
- Current redshirt

Roster

== Schedule ==
Date time, TV	Rank^{#}	Opponent^{#}	Result	Record	Site (attendance) city, state
Exhibition
11/08/2015*; 2:00 pm		Indiana (PA)	W 75–60		Peterson Events Center (836); Pittsburgh, PA
Non-conference regular season
11/13/2015*; 11:00 am		Wagner	W 67–41	1–0	Peterson Events Center (3,806); Pittsburgh, PA
11/16/2015*; 7:00 pm		at Saint Francis (PA)	W 74–59	2–0	DeGol Arena (845); Loretto, PA
11/20/2015*; 5:00 pm		Delaware State	W 77–43	3–0	Peterson Events Center (827); Pittsburgh, PA
11/26/2015*; 8:00 pm		vs. South Dakota State; Paradise Jam tournament Reef Division	L 54–55	3–1	Sports and Fitness Center (1,024); Saint Thomas, USVI
11/27/2015*; 8:00 pm		vs. Old Dominion; Paradise Jam Tournament Reef Division	W 67–58	4–1	Sports and Fitness Center (1,425); Saint Thomas, USVI
11/28/2015*; 8:00 pm		vs. No. 6 Maryland; Paradise Jam Tournament Reef Division	L 49–70	4–2	Sports and Fitness Center (1,749); Saint Thomas, USVI
12/03/2015*; 7:00 pm		at Michigan; ACC–Big Ten Women's Challenge	L 45–82	4–3	Crisler Center (1,737); Ann Arbor, MI
12/06/2015*; 3:00 pm		Holy Cross	W 56–50	5–3	Peterson Events Center (848); Pittsburgh, PA
12/08/2015*; 7:00 pm		Mount St. Mary's	W 74–57	6–3	Peterson Events Center (627); Pittsburgh, PA
12/12/2015*; 3:00 pm		at Princeton	L 47–61	6–4	Jadwin Gymnasium (1,002); Princeton, NJ
12/20/2015*; 2:00 pm		Rider	W 75–44	7–4	Peterson Events Center (852); Pittsburgh, PA
12/22/2015*; 2:00 pm		American	W 76–58	8–4	Peterson Events Center (605); Pittsburgh, PA
12/30/2015*; 2:00 pm		Duquesne; City Game	L 65–79	8–5	Peterson Events Center (2,377); Pittsburgh, PA
ACC regular season
01/03/2016; 3:00 pm, RSN		No. 3 Notre Dame	L 55–65	8–6 (0–1)	Peterson Events Center (3,610); Pittsburgh, PA
01/07/2016; 7:00 pm, ESPN3		at Miami (FL)	L 55–79	8–7 (0–2)	BankUnited Center (629); Coral Gables, FL
01/10/2016; 2:00 pm, RSN		NC State	L 76–78 ^{3OT}	8–8 (0–3)	Peterson Events Center (3,015); Pittsburgh, PA
01/14/2016; 7:00 pm		at Syracuse	L 48–71	8–9 (0–4)	Carrier Dome (424); Syracuse, NY
01/17/2016; 2:00 pm, ESPN3		No. 16 Florida State	L 55–66	8–10 (0–5)	Peterson Events Center (2,316); Pittsburgh, PA
01/21/2016; 7:00 pm		at Boston College	L 43–54	8–11 (0–6)	Conte Forum (411); Chestnut Hill, MA
01/24/2016; 1:00 pm, RSN		at Virginia	W 58–55	9–11 (1–6)	John Paul Jones Arena (2,895); Charlottesville, VA
01/28/2016; 7:00 pm, ESPN3		Duke	L 48–70	9–12 (1–7)	Peterson Events Center (1,204); Pittsburgh, PA
01/31/2016; 2:00 pm		at Clemson	W 59–56	10–12 (2–7)	Jervey Athletic Center (749); Clemson, SC
02/04/2016; 7:00 pm		Wake Forest	L 49–60	10–13 (2–8)	Peterson Events Center (828); Pittsburgh, PA
02/11/2016; 7:00 pm, ESPN3		No. 12 Louisville	L 61–84	10–14 (2–9)	Peterson Events Center (806); Pittsburgh, PA
02/14/2016; 2:00 pm		at Virginia Tech	W 59–48	11–14 (3–9)	Cassell Coliseum (2,143); Blacksburg, VA
02/18/2016; 7:00 pm		at North Carolina	W 76–60	12–14 (4–9)	Carmichael Arena (1,727); Chapel Hill, NC
02/21/2016; 3:00 pm, RSN		No. 23 Syracuse	L 56–70	12–15 (4–10)	Peterson Events Center (4,151); Pittsburgh, PA
02/25/2016; 7:00 pm, ESPN3		Georgia Tech	L 60–66	12–16 (4–11)	Peterson Events Center (867); Pittsburgh, PA
02/28/2016; 12:30 pm, RSN		at No. 10 Louisville	L 36–65	12–17 (4–12)	KFC Yum! Center (11,641); Louisville, KY
ACC Women's tournament
03/02/2016; 1:00 pm, RSN		vs. North Carolina; First Round	W 82–72 ^{OT}	13–17	Greensboro Coliseum; Greensboro, NC
03/03/2016; 11:00 am, RSN		vs. Miami (FL); Second Round	L 55–77	13–18	Greensboro Coliseum (6,107); Greensboro, NC
*Non-conference game. ^{#}Rankings from AP Poll. (#) Tournament seedings in parentheses. All times are in Eastern.

== Rankings ==
Regular season polls
Poll	Pre- season	Week 2	Week 3	Week 4	Week 5	Week 6	Week 7	Week 8	Week 9	Week 10	Week 11	Week 12	Week 13	Week 14	Week 15	Week 16	Week 17	Week 18	Week 19	Final
AP	NR	NR	NR	NR	NR	NR	NR	NR	NR	NR	NR	NR	NR	NR	NR	NR	NR	NR	NR	N/A
Coaches	NR	RV	NR	NR	NR	NR	NR	NR	NR	NR	NR	NR	NR	NR	NR	NR	NR	NR	NR	NR

Legend
	Increase in ranking
	Decrease in ranking
	Not ranked previous week
(RV)	Received votes
