= 2015–16 Boston College Eagles women's basketball team =

Intercollegiate basketball season

2015–16 Boston College Eagles women's basketball
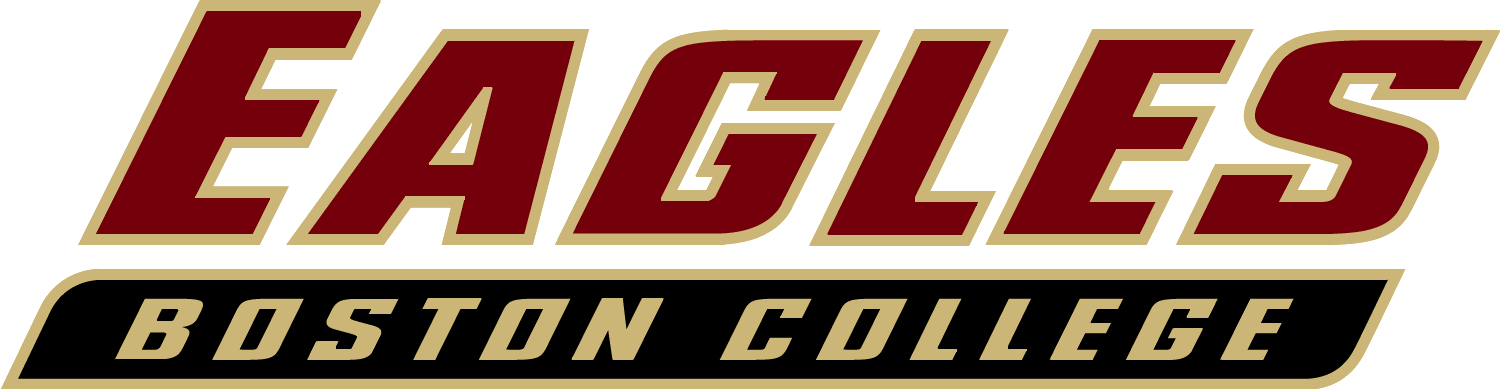
- Conference: Atlantic Coast Conference
- Record: 15–16 (2–14 ACC)
- Head coach: Erik Johnson (4th season)
- Assistant coaches: Yvonne Hawkins; Tom Garrick; Lisa Faulkner
- Home arena: Conte Forum

2015–16 ACC women's basketball standings
	Conf.				Overall
Team	W		L	PCT	W		L	PCT
No. 2 Notre Dame †	16	–	0	1.000	33	–	2	.943
No. 8 Louisville	15	–	1	.938	26	–	8	.765
No. 14 Syracuse	13	–	3	.813	30	–	8	.789
No. 17 Florida State	13	–	3	.813	25	–	8	.758
No. 19 Miami (FL)	10	–	6	.625	24	–	9	.727
NC State	10	–	6	.625	20	–	11	.645
Duke	8	–	8	.500	20	–	12	.625
Georgia Tech	8	–	8	.500	20	–	13	.606
Virginia	6	–	10	.375	18	–	16	.529
Wake Forest	6	–	10	.375	17	–	16	.515
Virginia Tech	5	–	11	.313	18	–	14	.563
North Carolina	4	–	12	.250	14	–	18	.438
Pittsburgh	4	–	12	.250	13	–	18	.419
Boston College	2	–	14	.125	15	–	16	.484
Clemson	0	–	16	.000	4	–	26	.133
† 2016 ACC tournament winner As of April 5, 2016; Rankings from AP poll

The 2015–16 Boston College Eagles women's basketball team represented Boston College during the 2015–16 college basketball season. The Eagles, were led by fourth year head coach Erik Johnson. The Eagles, members of the Atlantic Coast Conference, played their home games at the Conte Forum. They finished the season 15–16, 2–14 in ACC play to finish in fourteenth place. They advanced to the second round of the ACC women's tournament, where they lost to NC State.

== 2015–16 media ==
=== Boston College IMG Sports Network Affiliates ===
Select BC games, mostly home games and conference road games, will be broadcast on ZBC Sports. BC Game notes and stories will continue to be posted through their athletic website and on Twitter by following @bc_wbb.

== Roster ==
2015–16 Boston College Eagles women's basketball team
Players
Coaches

Pos.	#	Name	Height	Year	Previous school	Hometown
G	0	Ashley Kelsick	5 ft 8 in (1.73 m)	So	Highland	Palmdale, CA
G	1	Stephanie Jones	5 ft 7 in (1.7 m)	Fr	Loomis Chaffee School	Shelton, CT
G	2	Rachel Gartner	5 ft 8 in (1.73 m)	RS Fr	Danbury	Danbury, CT
G/F	10	Ella Awobajo	6 ft 0 in (1.83 m)	RS Fr	Neumann-Goretti	Kaduna, Nigeria
G	11	Nicole Boudreau	5 ft 9 in (1.75 m)	Sr	Andover	Andover, MA
F/C	13	Alexa Coulombe	6 ft 2 in (1.88 m)	Sr	Catherine McAuley	Falmouth, ME
G/F	14	Kailey Edwards	5 ft 9 in (1.75 m)	RS Jr	Legacy; Denver	Broomfield, CO
G	21	Martina Mosetti	5 ft 9 in (1.75 m)	So	Niccolo Tron	Trieste, Italy
G/F	22	Emilee Daley	6 ft 1 in (1.85 m)	Jr	Rivers School	Sharon, MA
G	23	Kelly Hughes	5 ft 11 in (1.8 m)	Jr	Point Pleasant Boro	Point Pleasant, NJ
F/C	34	Mariella Fasoula	6 ft 4 in (1.93 m)	Fr	American Community School of Athens	Athens, Greece
C	42	Katie Quandt	6 ft 3 in (1.91 m)	So	Lakeville South	Lakeville, MN

Head coach

Erik Johnson (UC San Diego)

Assistant coach(es)

Yvonne Hawkins (Ashland)
Tom Garrick (Rhode Island)
Lisa Faulkner (Denver)

Legend

- (C) Team captain
- (S) Suspended
- (I) Ineligible
- (W) Walk-on
- Injured
- Current redshirt

Roster

== Schedule ==
Date time, TV	Rank^{#}	Opponent^{#}	Result	Record	Site (attendance) city, state
Non-conference regular season
11/13/2015*; 7:00 pm		at Providence	W 67–41	1–0	Alumni Hall (461); Providence, RI
11/15/2015*; 1:00 pm		Maine	W 55–48	2–0	Conte Forum (1,123); Chestnut Hill, MA
11/18/2015*; 7:00 pm		Holy Cross	W 60–51	3–0	Conte Forum (413); Chestnut Hill, MA
11/21/2015*; 1:00 pm		at Boston University; Green Line Rivalry	W 58–37	4–0	Case Gym (351); Boston, MA
11/27/2015*; 8:00 pm		vs. Utah; Junkanoo Jam Reef Division	W 76–51	5–0	Grand Lucayan Resort (453); Freeport, BAH
11/28/2015*; 8:00 pm		vs. Oklahoma; Junkanoo Jam Reef Division	L 61–76	5–1	Grand Lucayan Resort (495); Freeport, BAH
12/03/2015*; 6:00 pm, BTN		at Purdue; ACC–Big Ten Women's Challenge	W 58–56	6–1	Mackey Arena (5,805); West Lafayette, IN
12/09/2015*; 7:00 pm		Hartford	W 62–28	7–1	Conte Forum (411); Chestnut Hill, MA
12/13/2015*; 1:00 pm		New Hampshire	W 71–51	8–1	Conte Forum (614); Chestnut Hill, MA
12/20/2015*; 1:00 pm		UMass Lowell	W 66–55	9–1	Conte Forum (537); Chestnut Hill, MA
12/28/2015*; 2:00 pm		at Northeastern	W 71–45	10–1	Cabot Center (327); Boston, MA
12/30/2015*; 6:00 pm		Bryant	W 74–59	11–1	Conte Forum (1,021); Chestnut Hill, MA
ACC regular season
01/03/2016; 2:00 pm		at Virginia Tech	L 33–58	11–2 (0–1)	Cassell Coliseum (1,433); Blacksburg, VA
01/07/2016; 7:00 pm, ESPN3		at No. 19 Florida State	L 42–75	11–3 (0–2)	Donald L. Tucker Civic Center (2,665); Tallahassee, FL
01/10/2016*; 1:00 pm		Yale	W 73–60	12–3	Conte Forum (1,015); Chestnut Hill, MA
01/14/2016; 7:00 pm		No. 3 Notre Dame	L 50–63	12–4 (0–3)	Conte Forum (1,179); Chestnut Hill, MA
01/17/2016; 2:00 pm, ESPN3		at No. 22 Duke	L 51–71	12–5 (0–4)	Cameron Indoor Stadium (3,983); Durham, NC
01/21/2016; 7:00 pm		Pittsburgh	W 54–43	13–5 (1–4)	Conte Forum (411); Chestnut Hill, MA
01/24/2016; 1:00 pm, RSN		Wake Forest	L 59–65	13–6 (1–5)	Conte Forum (544); Chestnut Hill, MA
01/27/2016; 7:00 pm, ESPN3		at Syracuse	L 61–62	13–7 (1–6)	Carrier Dome (375); Syracuse, NY
01/31/2016; 3:00 pm, RSN		at Georgia Tech	L 56–62	13–8 (1–7)	Hank McCamish Pavilion (1,003); Atlanta, GA
02/04/2016; 7:00 pm		Miami (FL)	L 62–67	13–9 (1–8)	Conte Forum (406); Chestnut Hill, MA
02/07/2016; 1:00 pm		North Carolina	L 78–86	13–10 (1–9)	Conte Forum (1,112); Chestnut Hill, MA
02/11/2016; 7:30 pm		at NC State	L 63–74	13–11 (1–10)	Broughton HS (1,639); Raleigh, NC
02/14/2016; 5:00 pm, RSN		Virginia	L 50–61	13–12 (1–11)	Conte Forum (522); Chestnut Hill, MA
02/18/2016; 7:00 pm		at Clemson	W 67–64	14–12 (2–11)	Jervey Athletic Center (575); Clemson, SC
02/21/2016; 1:00 pm		No. 11 Louisville	L 45–55	14–13 (2–12)	Conte Forum (1,454); Chestnut Hill, MA
02/25/2016; 7:00 pm		No. 18 Syracuse	L 55–71	14–14 (2–13)	Conte Forum (718); Chestnut Hill, MA
02/27/2016; 1:00 pm		at No. 2 Notre Dame	L 48–70	14–15 (2–14)	Edmund P. Joyce Center (9,149); South Bend, IN
ACC Women's Tournament
03/02/2016; 6:30 pm, RSN		vs. Virginia Tech; First Round	W 49–37	15–15	Greensboro Coliseum (1,123); Greensboro, NC
03/03/2016; 6:00 pm, RSN		vs. NC State; Second Round	L 60–76	15–16	Greensboro Coliseum (3,374); Greensboro, NC
*Non-conference game. ^{#}Rankings from AP Poll. (#) Tournament seedings in parentheses. All times are in Eastern.

== Rankings ==
2015–16 NCAA Division I women's basketball rankings

Regular season polls
Poll	Pre- Season	Week 2	Week 3	Week 4	Week 5	Week 6	Week 7	Week 8	Week 9	Week 10	Week 11	Week 12	Week 13	Week 14	Week 15	Week 16	Week 17	Week 18	Week 19	Final
AP	NR	NR	NR	NR	NR	NR	NR	NR	NR	NR	NR	NR	NR	NR	NR	NR	NR	NR	NR	N/A
Coaches	NR	NR	NR	NR	RV	NR	NR	RV	RV	NR	NR	NR	NR	NR	NR	NR	NR	NR	NR	NR

Legend
	Increase in ranking
	Decrease in ranking
	Not ranked previous week
(RV)	Received Votes

== See also ==
- Boston College Eagles women's basketball
- 2015–16 Boston College Eagles men's basketball team
