= 2015–16 Miami Hurricanes women's basketball team =

Intercollegiate basketball season

2015–16 Miami Hurricanes women's basketball

NCAA Women's Tournament, first round
- Conference: Atlantic Coast Conference

Ranking
- Coaches: No. 24
- AP: No. 19
- Record: 24–9 (10–6 ACC)
- Head coach: Katie Meier (11th season)
- Assistant coaches: Octavia Blue; Tia Jackson; Fitzroy Anthony
- Home arena: BankUnited Center

2015–16 ACC women's basketball standings
	Conf.				Overall
Team	W		L	PCT	W		L	PCT
No. 2 Notre Dame †	16	–	0	1.000	33	–	2	.943
No. 8 Louisville	15	–	1	.938	26	–	8	.765
No. 14 Syracuse	13	–	3	.813	30	–	8	.789
No. 17 Florida State	13	–	3	.813	25	–	8	.758
No. 19 Miami (FL)	10	–	6	.625	24	–	9	.727
NC State	10	–	6	.625	20	–	11	.645
Duke	8	–	8	.500	20	–	12	.625
Georgia Tech	8	–	8	.500	20	–	13	.606
Virginia	6	–	10	.375	18	–	16	.529
Wake Forest	6	–	10	.375	17	–	16	.515
Virginia Tech	5	–	11	.313	18	–	14	.563
North Carolina	4	–	12	.250	14	–	18	.438
Pittsburgh	4	–	12	.250	13	–	18	.419
Boston College	2	–	14	.125	15	–	16	.484
Clemson	0	–	16	.000	4	–	26	.133
† 2016 ACC tournament winner As of April 5, 2016; Rankings from AP poll

The 2015–16 Miami hurricanes women's basketball team represented the University of Miami during the 2015–16 NCAA Division I women's basketball season. The Hurricanes, led by eleventh-year head coach Katie Meier, played their home games at the BankUnited Center and were members of the Atlantic Coast Conference. They finished the season 24–9, 10–6 in ACC play to finish in a tie for fifth place. They advanced to the quarterfinals of the ACC women's tournament, where they lost to Notre Dame. They received an at-large bid to the NCAA women's tournament, where they were upset by South Dakota State in the first round.

== Roster ==
2015–16 Miami Hurricanes women's basketball team
Players
Coaches

Pos.	#	Name	Height	Year	Previous school	Hometown
F	0	Keyanna Harris	6 ft 0 in (1.83 m)	So	William T. Dwyer	Palm Beach Gardens, FL
G	1	Laura Cornelius	5 ft 8 in (1.73 m)	Fr	Caland Lyceum	Groningen, Netherlands
G	3	Jessica Thomas	5 ft 6 in (1.68 m)	Jr	Buchholz	Gainesville, FL
G	4	Shaneese Bailey (I) (redshirt)	5 ft 9 in (1.75 m)	Jr	University Christian School; Florida Atlantic	Callahan, FL
G	5	Nigia Greene	5 ft 10 in (1.78 m)	RS So	St. Francis	Atlanta, GA
G	10	Michelle Woods	5 ft 8 in (1.73 m)	RS Sr	Community	Naples, FL
F	20	Keyona Hayes	6 ft 1 in (1.85 m)	RS Jr	St. Francis	Marietta, GA
F	21	Emese Hof	6 ft 3 in (1.91 m)	Fr	Caland Lyceum	Utrecht, Netherlands
F/C	22	Zada Williams	6 ft 2 in (1.88 m)	Fr	Lake Wales	Babson Park, FL
G	23	Adrienne Motley	5 ft 9 in (1.75 m)	Jr	Woodside	Newport News, VA
F	25	Khaila Prather	6 ft 1 in (1.85 m)	So	Riverdale Baptist	Baltimore, MD
F	30	Erykah Davenport	6 ft 2 in (1.88 m)	So	Tucker	Tucker, GA

Head coach

- Katie Meier (Duke)

Assistant coach(es)

- Octavia Blue (Miami (FL))
- Tia Jackson (Iowa)
- Fitzroy Anthony (Palm Beach Atlantic)

Legend

- (C) Team captain
- (S) Suspended
- (I) Ineligible
- (W) Walk-on
- Injured
- Current redshirt

Roster
Last update: 2015-10-20

== Media ==
All home games and conference road games will be broadcast on WVUM as part of the Miami Hurricanes Learfield Sports contract.

== Schedule ==
Date time, TV	Rank^{#}	Opponent^{#}	Result	Record	Site (attendance) city, state
Exhibition
Nov 4, 2015*; 4:00 pm, ESPN3		Nova Southeastern	W 83–53		BankUnited Center (445); Coral Gables, FL
Non-conference regular season
Nov 13, 2015*; 11:00 am, ESPN3		Wright State	W 80–67	1–0	BankUnited Center (4,034); Coral Gables, FL
Nov 15, 2015*; 4:00 pm, ESPN3		Bethune-Cookman	W 55–47	2–0	BankUnited Center (718); Coral Gables, FL
Nov 17, 2015*; 7:00 pm		at Old Dominion	W 61–35	3–0	Ted Constant Convocation Center (2,576); Norfolk, VA
Nov 21, 2015*; 2:30 pm, ESPN3		at Loyola Chicago	W 77–50	4–0	Joseph J. Gentile Arena (221); Chicago, IL
Nov 23, 2015*; 7:00 pm		at Charlotte	W 77–70	5–0	Dale F. Halton Arena (720); Charlotte, NC
Nov 27, 2015*; 1:00 pm, ESPN3		Milwaukee; Miami Thanksgiving Classic	W 77–38	6–0	BankUnited Center (631); Coral Gables, FL
Nov 29, 2015*; 1:00 pm, ESPN3		La Salle; Miami Thanksgiving Classic	W 86–58	7–0	BankUnited Center (570); Coral Gables, FL
Dec 2, 2015*; 7:00 pm, ESPN3		Illinois; ACC–Big Ten Women's Challenge	W 73–64	8–0	BankUnited Center (910); Coral Gables, FL
Dec 4, 2015*; 7:00 pm, ESPN3		Coppin State	W 78–59	9–0	BankUnited Center (616); Coral Gables, FL
Dec 6, 2015*; 1:00 pm, ESPN3		UMass Lowell	W 84–53	10–0	BankUnited Center (556); Coral Gables, FL
Dec 19, 2015*; 7:00 pm	No. 23	vs. No. 4 Baylor; Florida Sunshine Classic	L 81–88	10–1	Worden Arena (1,789); Winter Haven, FL
Dec 20, 2015*; 7:15 pm	No. 23	vs. Indiana; Florida Sunshine Classic	W 89–75	11–1	Worden Arena (1,367); Winter Haven, FL
Dec 22, 2015*; 2:00 pm, ESPN3	No. 23	FIU	W 83–55	12–1	BankUnited Center (650); Coral Gables, FL
ACC regular season
Dec 30, 2015; 7:00 pm, ESPN3	No. 22	NC State	W 73–44	13–1 (1–0)	BankUnited Center (857); Coral Gables, FL
Jan 3, 2016; 1:00 pm, RSN	No. 22	at Virginia	L 56–76	13–2 (1–1)	John Paul Jones Arena (3,656); Charlottesville, VA
Jan 7, 2016; 7:00 pm, ESPN3		Pittsburgh	W 79–55	14–2 (2–1)	BankUnited Center (629); Coral Gables, FL
Jan 10, 2016; 4:00 pm, ESPN3		at Clemson	W 83–49	15–2 (3–1)	Jervey Athletic Center (733); Clemson, SC
Jan 14, 2016; 7:00 pm, ESPN3	No. 21	Wake Forest	W 71–60	16–2 (4–1)	BankUnited Center (606); Coral Gables, FL
Jan 17, 2016; 12:30 pm, RSN	No. 21	at North Carolina	W 76–61	17–2 (5–1)	Carmichael Arena (2,761); Chapel Hill, NC
Jan 24, 2016; 1:00 pm, ESPN3	No. 16	No. 14 Florida State	L 58–69	17–3 (5–2)	BankUnited Center (2,313); Coral Gables, FL
Jan 28, 2016; 7:00 pm, ESPN3	No. 17	at Virginia Tech	W 57–45	18–3 (6–2)	Cassell Coliseum (1,447); Blacksburg, VA
Feb 1, 2016; 7:00 pm, RSN	No. 16	Syracuse	L 51–57	18–4 (6–3)	BankUnited Center (745); Coral Gables, FL
Feb 4, 2016; 7:00 pm	No. 16	at Boston College	W 67–62	19–4 (7–3)	Conte Forum (406); Chestnut Hill, MA
Feb 7, 2016; 1:00 pm, RSN	No. 16	Duke	W 61–53	20–4 (8–3)	BankUnited Center (1,293); Coral Gables, FL
Feb 11, 2016; 7:00 pm, ESPN3	No. 19	at Georgia Tech	W 58–55	21–4 (9–3)	Hank McCamish Pavilion (975); Atlanta, GA
Feb 14, 2016; 1:00 pm, RSN	No. 19	at No. 3 Notre Dame	L 69–90	21–5 (9–4)	Edmund P. Joyce Center (9,149); South Bend, IN
Feb 21, 2016; 4:00 pm, ESPN3	No. 18	Virginia Tech	W 67–56 ^{OT}	22–5 (10–4)	BankUnited Center (2,180); Coral Gables, FL
Feb 25, 2016; 7:00 pm, ESPN3	No. 17	No. 10 Louisville	L 51–79	22–6 (10–5)	BankUnited Center (1,378); Coral Gables, FL
Feb 28, 2016; 3:00 pm, ESPN2	No. 17	at No. 12 Florida State	L 67–70	22–7 (10–6)	Donald L. Tucker Civic Center (3,945); Tallahassee, FL
ACC Women's Tournament
Mar 3, 2016; 11:00 am, RSN	No. 21	vs. Pittsburgh; Second Round	W 77–55	23–7	Greensboro Coliseum (8,790); Greensboro, NC
Mar 4, 2016; 11:00 am, RSN	No. 21	vs. No. 14 Florida State; Quarterfinals	W 74–56	24–7	Greensboro Coliseum (8,548); Greensboro, NC
Mar 5, 2016; 12:00 pm, ESPNU	No. 21	vs. No. 2 Notre Dame; Semifinals	L 67–78	24–8	Greensboro Coliseum (6,361); Greensboro, NC
NCAA Women's Tournament
Mar 19, 2016*; 6:30 pm, ESPN2	(5 L) No. 19	vs. (12 L) South Dakota State; First Round	L 71–74	24–9	Maples Pavilion (3,106); Stanford, CA
*Non-conference game. ^{#}Rankings from AP Poll. (#) Tournament seedings in parentheses. L=Lexington Region. All times are in Eastern.

== Rankings ==
Regular season polls
Poll	Pre- season	Week 2	Week 3	Week 4	Week 5	Week 6	Week 7	Week 8	Week 9	Week 10	Week 11	Week 12	Week 13	Week 14	Week 15	Week 16	Week 17	Week 18	Week 19	Final
AP	RV	RV	RV	RV	RV	23	23	22	RV	21	16	17	16	19	18	17	21	20	19	N/A
Coaches	RV	RV	RV	RV	22	21	20	20	RV	20	16	17	20	17	17	17	21	19	19	24

Legend
	Increase in ranking
	Decrease in ranking
	Not ranked previous week
(RV)	Received votes

== See also ==
- 2015–16 Miami Hurricanes men's basketball team
