= 2015–16 Clemson Tigers women's basketball team =

Intercollegiate basketball season

2015–16 Clemson Tigers women's basketball
- Conference: Atlantic Coast Conference
- Record: 4–26 (0–16 ACC)
- Head coach: Audra Smith (3rd season)
- Assistant coaches: Daryl Oliver; Marc Wilson; Margaret Richards
- Home arena: Jervey Athletic Center

2015–16 ACC women's basketball standings
	Conf.				Overall
Team	W		L	PCT	W		L	PCT
No. 2 Notre Dame †	16	–	0	1.000	33	–	2	.943
No. 8 Louisville	15	–	1	.938	26	–	8	.765
No. 14 Syracuse	13	–	3	.813	30	–	8	.789
No. 17 Florida State	13	–	3	.813	25	–	8	.758
No. 19 Miami (FL)	10	–	6	.625	24	–	9	.727
NC State	10	–	6	.625	20	–	11	.645
Duke	8	–	8	.500	20	–	12	.625
Georgia Tech	8	–	8	.500	20	–	13	.606
Virginia	6	–	10	.375	18	–	16	.529
Wake Forest	6	–	10	.375	17	–	16	.515
Virginia Tech	5	–	11	.313	18	–	14	.563
North Carolina	4	–	12	.250	14	–	18	.438
Pittsburgh	4	–	12	.250	13	–	18	.419
Boston College	2	–	14	.125	15	–	16	.484
Clemson	0	–	16	.000	4	–	26	.133
† 2016 ACC tournament winner As of April 5, 2016; Rankings from AP poll

The 2015–16 Clemson Tigers women's basketball team represented Clemson University during the 2015–16 college basketball season. The Tigers were led by third year head coach Audra Smith. The Tigers, members of the Atlantic Coast Conference, played their home games at Jervey Athletic Center due to renovations at Littlejohn Coliseum. They finished the season 4–26, 0–16 in ACC play to finish in last place. They lost in the first round of ACC women's tournament to Wake Forest.

== Roster ==
2015–16 Clemson Tigers women's basketball team
Players
Coaches

Pos.	#	Name	Height	Year	Previous school	Hometown
G/F	0	Nelly Perry	5 ft 10 in (1.78 m)	So	Brimm Medical Arts	Camden, NJ
G	3	Victoria Cardaci	5 ft 5 in (1.65 m)	So	Holmdel	Holmdel, NJ
G	5	Danielle Edwards	5 ft 7 in (1.7 m)	Fr	McDonogh School	Perry Hall, MD
G/F	10	Francesca Tagliapietra	5 ft 9 in (1.75 m)	So	Liceo Scientifico Nicolo' Tron	Carrè, Italy
G/F	11	Gadson Lefft	6 ft 1 in (1.85 m)	Fr	Heathwood Hall/Phillips Academy	Lake Wylie, SC
G	12	Aliyah Collier	5 ft 9 in (1.75 m)	Fr	Laney	Augusta, GA
C	14	Paige Mosley	5 ft 11 in (1.8 m)	Jr	Wesleyan School/Georgia Hoopstars	Warner Robins, GA
C	20	Sirah Diarra	6 ft 2 in (1.88 m)	Fr	Champlain College Saint-Lambert	Longueuil, QE
C	21	MaKayla Johnson	6 ft 4 in (1.93 m)	So	Dreher	Columbia, SC
G	22	Keniece Purvis	5 ft 7 in (1.7 m)	Fr	New Garden Friends School	Greensboro, NC
C	24	Ivy Atkism	6 ft 2 in (1.88 m)	So	George Walton Academy	Monroe, GA
C	32	Morgan Roos	6 ft 3 in (1.91 m)	Fr	Rock Canyon	Castle Pines, CO
G	33	Alexis Carter	5 ft 7 in (1.7 m)	So	Tigard	Portland, OR
C	34	Justice Wright	6 ft 4 in (1.93 m)	So	Houston County	Warner Robins, GA

Head coach

Audra Smith (Virginia)

Assistant coach(es)

Daryl Oliver (Richmond)
Marc Wilson (Minnesota)
Margaret Richards (Nebraska)

Legend

- (C) Team captain
- (S) Suspended
- (I) Ineligible
- (W) Walk-on
- Injured
- Current redshirt

Roster

== Schedule ==
Date time, TV	Rank^{#}	Opponent^{#}	Result	Record	Site (attendance) city, state
Exhibition
11/01/2015*; 2:00 pm		St. Thomas	W 78–48		Jervey Athletic Center; Clemson, SC
11/08/2015*; 2:00 pm		at Anderson	L 55–79		Abney Athletic Center; Anderson, SC
Non-conference regular season
11/13/2015*; 12:00 pm		Charleston Southern	W 43–36	1–0	Jervey Athletic Center (584); Clemson, SC
11/15/2015*; 2:00 pm		Coastal Carolina	L 47–63	1–1	Jervey Athletic Center (426); Clemson, SC
11/18/2015*; 7:00 pm, ESPN3		No. 2 South Carolina; Rivalry	L 41–67	1–2	Jervey Athletic Center (1,030); Clemson, SC
11/21/2015*; 7:00 pm, ESPN3		at Furman	L 49–70	1–3	Timmons Arena; Greenville, SC
11/24/2015*; 9:00 pm		at Oregon	L 56–69	1–4	Matthew Knight Arena (1,188); Eugene, OR
11/28/2015*; 12:00 pm		vs. Butler; UCF Thanksgiving Classic	L 50–54	1–5	CFE Arena (206); Orlando, FL
11/29/2015*; 12:00 pm		vs. Buffalo; UCF Thanksgiving Classic	L 51–61	1–6	CFE Arena (101); Orlando, FL
12/02/2015*; 7:00 pm		South Carolina State	W 63–54	2–6	Jervey Athletic Center (198); Clemson, SC
12/05/2015*; 6:00 pm		William & Mary	L 41–58	2–7	Jervey Athletic Center (222); Clemson, SC
12/13/2015*; 2:00 pm		at Tennessee Tech	W 71–53	3–7	Eblen Center (610); Cookeville, TN
12/18/2015*; 7:00 pm		at Maine	L 42–75	3–8	Cross Insurance Center (1,648); Bangor, ME
12/21/2015*; 12:00 pm		UNC Asheville	W 67–49	4–8	Jervey Athletic Center (622); Clemson, SC
12/29/2015*; 7:00 pm		Florida A&M	L 68–77	4–9	Jervey Athletic Center (324); Clemson, SC
ACC regular season
01/03/2016; 2:00 pm, ESPN3		at North Carolina	L 56–72	4–10 (0–1)	Carmichael Arena (2,163); Chapel Hill, NC
01/10/2016; 4:00 pm, ESPN3		Miami (FL)	L 49–83	4–11 (0–2)	Jervey Athletic Center (733); Clemson, SC
01/14/2016; 7:00 pm, ESPN3		No. 16 Florida State	L 40–85	4–12 (0–3)	Jervey Athletic Center (584); Clemson, SC
01/18/2016; 7:00 pm, RSN		at Virginia Tech	L 49–79	4–13 (0–4)	Cassell Coliseum (1,545); Blacksburg, VA
01/21/2016; 7:00 pm, ESPN3		Duke	L 43–72	4–14 (0–5)	Jervey Athletic Center (494); Clemson, SC
01/24/2016; 2:00 pm, ESPN3		Georgia Tech	L 63–76	4–15 (0–6)	Jervey Athletic Center (821); Clemson, SC
01/28/2016; 7:00 pm, ESPN3		at No. 14 Louisville	L 33–75	4–16 (0–7)	KFC Yum! Center (8,379); Louisville, KY
01/31/2016; 2:00 pm		Pittsburgh	L 56–59	4–17 (0–8)	Jervey Athletic Center (749); Clemson, SC
02/04/2016; 7:00 pm, TWCSC/ESPN3		at Syracuse	L 62–83	4–18 (0–9)	Carrier Dome (407); Syracuse, NY
02/07/2016; 2:00 pm		at No. 10 Florida State	L 56–75	4–19 (0–10)	Donald L. Tucker Civic Center (3,138); Tallahassee, FL
02/11/2016; 7:00 pm		Wake Forest	L 45–55	4–20 (0–11)	Jervey Athletic Center (641); Clemson, SC
02/14/2016; 2:00 pm		at Georgia Tech	L 48–77	4–21 (0–12)	Hank McCamish Pavilion (1,012); Atlanta, GA
02/18/2016; 7:00 pm		Boston College	L 64–67	4–22 (0–13)	Jervey Athletic Center (575); Clemson, SC
02/21/2016; 1:00 pm, RSN		at Virginia	L 48–65	4–23 (0–14)	John Paul Jones Arena (5,012); Charlottesville, VA
02/25/2016; 7:00 pm		at No. 2 Notre Dame	L 52–71	4–24 (0–15)	Edmund P. Joyce Center (8,378); South Bend, IN
02/28/2016; 2:00 pm		NC State	L 57–71	4–25 (0–16)	Jervey Athletic Center (943); Clemson, SC
ACC Women's Tournament
03/02/2016; 3:30 pm, RSN		vs. Wake Forest; First Round	L 58–73	4–26	Greensboro Coliseum; Greensboro, NC
*Non-conference game. ^{#}Rankings from AP Poll. (#) Tournament seedings in parentheses. All times are in Eastern.

== Rankings ==
2015–16 NCAA Division I women's basketball rankings

Regular season polls
Poll	Pre- Season	Week 2	Week 3	Week 4	Week 5	Week 6	Week 7	Week 8	Week 9	Week 10	Week 11	Week 12	Week 13	Week 14	Week 15	Week 16	Week 17	Week 18	Final
AP																			
Coaches																			

Legend
	Increase in ranking
	Decrease in ranking
	Not ranked previous week
(RV)	Received Votes

== See also ==
- 2015–16 Clemson Tigers men's basketball team
