= 2015–16 Wake Forest Demon Deacons women's basketball team =

Intercollegiate basketball season

2015–16 Wake Forest Demon Deacons women's basketball

WNIT, Second Round
- Conference: Atlantic Coast Conference
- Record: 17–16 (6–10 ACC)
- Head coach: Jen Hoover (4th season)
- Assistant coaches: Mike Terry; Gayle Coats Fulks; Clarisse Garcia
- Home arena: LJVM Coliseum

2015–16 ACC women's basketball standings
	Conf.				Overall
Team	W		L	PCT	W		L	PCT
No. 2 Notre Dame †	16	–	0	1.000	33	–	2	.943
No. 8 Louisville	15	–	1	.938	26	–	8	.765
No. 14 Syracuse	13	–	3	.813	30	–	8	.789
No. 17 Florida State	13	–	3	.813	25	–	8	.758
No. 19 Miami (FL)	10	–	6	.625	24	–	9	.727
NC State	10	–	6	.625	20	–	11	.645
Duke	8	–	8	.500	20	–	12	.625
Georgia Tech	8	–	8	.500	20	–	13	.606
Virginia	6	–	10	.375	18	–	16	.529
Wake Forest	6	–	10	.375	17	–	16	.515
Virginia Tech	5	–	11	.313	18	–	14	.563
North Carolina	4	–	12	.250	14	–	18	.438
Pittsburgh	4	–	12	.250	13	–	18	.419
Boston College	2	–	14	.125	15	–	16	.484
Clemson	0	–	16	.000	4	–	26	.133
† 2016 ACC tournament winner As of April 5, 2016; Rankings from AP poll

The 2015–16 Wake Forest Demon Deacons women's basketball team represented Wake Forest University during the 2015–16 college basketball season. The Demon Deacons, led by fourth-year head coach Jen Hoover, were members of the Atlantic Coast Conference and played their home games at the Lawrence Joel Veterans Memorial Coliseum. They finished the season 17–16, 6–10 in ACC play to finish in a tie for ninth place. They advanced to the second round of the ACC women's tournament, where they lost to Georgia Tech. They were invited to the Women's National Invitation Tournament, where they defeated Charlotte in the first round before losing to Florida Gulf Coast in the second round.

== 2015–16 media ==
The Wake Forest Demon Deacons IMG Sports Network broadcast Demon Deacons games on

== Roster ==
2015–16 Wake Forest Demon Deacons women's basketball team
Players
Coaches

Pos.	#	Name	Height	Year	Previous school	Hometown
G/F	1	Destini Walker	6 ft 0 in (1.83 m)	Fr	Hermitage	Ossining, NY
G	2	Amber Campbell	5 ft 9 in (1.75 m)	So	Northwood Academy	Charleston, SC
G	3	Ataijah Taylor	5 ft 9 in (1.75 m)	Jr	Salem	Roanoke, VA
F	5	Clarisse Berranger	6 ft 3 in (1.91 m)	GS	Lycée Alain-Fournier; Université de Limoges	Remiremont, France
G	10	Taylor Gordon	5 ft 11 in (1.8 m)	So	McEachern	Powder Springs, GA
G	11	Jill Brunori	6 ft 1 in (1.85 m)	RS So	Hilton Head Preparatory	Hilton Head, SC
G	15	Kortni Simmons	5 ft 8 in (1.73 m)	Fr	West Florence	Spotsylvania, PA
F	21	Keyonna Allen	6 ft 0 in (1.83 m)	GS	Forest Park; Presbyterian	Forest Park, GA
G	24	Kelila Atkinson	6 ft 0 in (1.83 m)	RS So	Riverdale Baptist	Woodbridge, VA
G	25	Ariel Stephenson	5 ft 10 in (1.78 m)	Fr	Prince George	Prince George, VA
F	32	Milan Quinn	6 ft 1 in (1.85 m)	So	Phillip O. Berry Academy of Technology	Charlotte, NC
F	42	Kandice Ball	6 ft 3 in (1.91 m)	Jr	Oak Hill Academy	Pulaski, VA

Head coach

- Jen Hoover (Wake Forest)

Assistant coach(es)

- Mike Terry (Western Ontario)
- Gayle Coats Fulks (Fairleigh Dickinson)
- Clairsse Garcia (Villanova)

Legend

- (C) Team captain
- (S) Suspended
- (I) Ineligible
- (W) Walk-on
- Injured
- Current redshirt

Roster
Last update: 2015-10-21

== Schedule ==
Date time, TV	Rank^{#}	Opponent^{#}	Result	Record	Site (attendance) city, state
Non-conference regular season
11/13/2015*; 5:00 pm, ESPN3		LSU	W 60–57	1–0	LJVM Coliseum (662); Winston-Salem, NC
11/15/2015*; 2:00 pm		East Tennessee State	W 69–52	2–0	LJVM Coliseum (554); Winston-Salem, NC
11/17/2015*; 7:00 pm		Davidson	W 77–58	3–0	LJVM Coliseum (383); Winston-Salem, NC
11/22/2015*; 7:00 pm, SECN		at Missouri	L 81–94	3–1	Mizzou Arena (2,538); Columbia, MO
11/25/2015*; 2:00 pm		La Salle	W 61–53	4–1	LJVM Coliseum (365); Winston-Salem, NC
11/29/2015*; 2:00 pm		at American	W 71–70	5–1	Bender Arena (268); Washington, D.C.
12/02/2015*; 7:00 pm, ESPN3		Wisconsin; ACC–Big Ten Women's Challenge	L 51–64	5–2	LJVM Coliseum (382); Winston-Salem, NC
12/06/2015*; 2:00 pm		Belmont	L 64–78	5–3	LJVM Coliseum (497); Winston-Salem, NC
12/14/2015*; 11:00 am		Jacksonville	W 57–51	6–3	LJVM Coliseum (8,849); Winston-Salem, NC
12/18/2015*; 7:30 pm		vs. Coastal Carolina; Carolinas Challenge	W 81–52	7–3	Myrtle Beach Convention Center (527); Myrtle Beach, SC
12/20/2015*; 2:00 pm		Richmond	W 43–33	8–3	LJVM Coliseum (584); Winston-Salem, NC
12/28/2015*; 2:00 pm		vs. Hampton; The Surfing Santa Classic semifinals	L 42–47	8–4	FIU Arena (375); Miami, FL
12/29/2015*; 2:00 pm		at FIU; The Surfing Santa Classic 3rd place game	W 57–53	9–4	FIU Arena (353); Miami, FL
ACC regular season
01/03/2016; 2:00 pm		at NC State	L 47–64	9–5 (0–1)	Broughton HS (2,065); Raleigh, NC
01/07/2016; 7:00 pm, ESPN3		at No. 18 Duke	L 68–95	9–6 (0–2)	Cameron Indoor Stadium (3,937); Durham, NC
01/10/2016; 2:00 pm		Virginia	L 50–52	9–7 (0–3)	LJVM Coliseum (875); Winston-Salem, NC
01/14/2016; 7:00 pm, ESPN3		at No. 21 Miami (FL)	L 60–71	9–8 (0–4)	BankUnited Center (606); Coral Gables, FL
01/17/2016; 2:00 pm		Syracuse	L 65–91	9–9 (0–5)	LJVM Coliseum (529); Winston-Salem, NC
01/21/2016; 7:00 pm, ESPN3		North Carolina	W 75–63	10–9 (1–5)	LJVM Coliseum (635); Winston-Salem, NC
01/24/2016; 1:00 pm, RSN		at Boston College	W 65–59	11–9 (2–5)	Conte Forum (544); Chestnut Hill, MA
01/28/2016; 7:00 pm		No. 11 Florida State	L 55–96	11–10 (2–6)	LJVM Coliseum (670); Winston-Salem, NC
01/31/2016; 1:00 pm, RSN		at No. 14 Louisville	L 54–78	11–11 (2–7)	KFC Yum! Center (9,673); Louisville, KY
02/04/2016; 7:00 pm		at Pittsburgh	W 60–49	12–11 (3-7)	Peterson Events Center (828); Pittsburgh, PA
02/07/2016; 3:00 pm, RSN		NC State	W 63–58	13–11 (4–7)	LJVM Coliseum (701); Winston-Salem, NC
02/11/2016; 7:00 pm		at Clemson	W 55–45	14–11 (5–7)	Jervey Athletic Center (641); Clemson, SC
02/14/2016; 2:00 pm, ESPN3		Duke	W 64–58	15–11 (6–7)	LJVM Coliseum (1,458); Winston-Salem, NC
02/18/2016; 7:00 pm		No. 2 Notre Dame	L 52–86	15–12 (6–8)	LJVM Coliseum (692); Winston-Salem, NC
02/25/2016; 7:00 pm		Virginia Tech	L 48–54	15–13 (6–9)	LJVM Coliseum (679); Winston-Salem, NC
02/28/2016; 2:00 pm, ESPN3		at Georgia Tech	L 51–66	15–14 (6–10)	Hank McCamish Pavilion (1,316); Atlanta, GA
ACC Women's Tournament
03/02/2016; 3:30 pm, RSN		vs. Clemson; First Round	W 73–58	16–14	Greensboro Coliseum; Greensboro, NC
03/03/2016; 6:00 pm, RSN		vs. Georgia Tech; Second Round	L 65–67	16–15	Greensboro Coliseum; Greensboro, NC
WNIT
03/17/2016*; 7:00 pm		at Charlotte; First Round	W 72–69	17–15	Dale F. Halton Arena (497); Charlotte, NC
03/21/2016*; 7:00 pm		at Florida Gulf Coast; Second Round	L 48–67	17–16	Alico Arena (1,505); Fort Myers, FL
*Non-conference game. ^{#}Rankings from AP Poll. (#) Tournament seedings in parentheses. All times are in Eastern.

== Rankings ==
Regular season polls
Poll	Pre- season	Week 2	Week 3	Week 4	Week 5	Week 6	Week 7	Week 8	Week 9	Week 10	Week 11	Week 12	Week 13	Week 14	Week 15	Week 16	Week 17	Week 18	Week 19	Final
AP	NR	NR	NR	NR	NR	NR	NR	NR	NR	NR	NR	NR	NR	NR	NR	NR	NR	NR	NR	N/A
Coaches	NR	NR	NR	RV	NR	NR	NR	NR	NR	NR	NR	NR	NR	NR	RV	NR	NR	NR	NR	NR

Legend
	Increase in ranking
	Decrease in ranking
	Not ranked previous week
(RV)	Received votes

== See also ==
- 2015–16 Wake Forest Demon Deacons men's basketball team
