= 2016 ACC women's basketball tournament =

- Classification: Division I
- Season: 2015–16
- Teams: 15
- Site: Greensboro Coliseum; Greensboro, North Carolina
- Champions: Notre Dame (3rd title)
- Winning coach: Muffet McGraw (3rd title)
- MVP: Madison Cable (Notre Dame)
- Attendance: 25,681
- Television: ESPN, ESPNU, ACCRSN

2015–16 ACC women's basketball standings
	Conf.				Overall
Team	W		L	PCT	W		L	PCT
No. 2 Notre Dame †	16	–	0	1.000	33	–	2	.943
No. 8 Louisville	15	–	1	.938	26	–	8	.765
No. 14 Syracuse	13	–	3	.813	30	–	8	.789
No. 17 Florida State	13	–	3	.813	25	–	8	.758
No. 19 Miami (FL)	10	–	6	.625	24	–	9	.727
NC State	10	–	6	.625	20	–	11	.645
Duke	8	–	8	.500	20	–	12	.625
Georgia Tech	8	–	8	.500	20	–	13	.606
Virginia	6	–	10	.375	18	–	16	.529
Wake Forest	6	–	10	.375	17	–	16	.515
Virginia Tech	5	–	11	.313	18	–	14	.563
North Carolina	4	–	12	.250	14	–	18	.438
Pittsburgh	4	–	12	.250	13	–	18	.419
Boston College	2	–	14	.125	15	–	16	.484
Clemson	0	–	16	.000	4	–	26	.133
† 2016 ACC tournament winner As of April 5, 2016; Rankings from AP poll

The 2016 Atlantic Coast Conference women's basketball tournament was the postseason women's basketball tournament for the Atlantic Coast Conference held March 2–6, 2016, in Greensboro, North Carolina, at the Greensboro Coliseum. Notre Dame won their third straight ACC tournament title to earn an automatic trip to the NCAA women's tournament.

== Seeding ==
Tournament seeds are determined by teams' regular season conference record, with tiebreakers determined by ACC tiebreaking rules.

2016 ACC women's basketball tournament seeds and results
Seed	School	Conf.	Over.	Tiebreaker
1	Notre Dame	16–0	28–1	
2	Louisville	15–1	24–6	
3	Syracuse	13–3	23–6	1–0 vs. FSU
4	Florida State	13–3	24–6	0–1 vs. SYR
5	Miami (FL)	10–6	22–7	1–0 vs. NCST
6	NC State	10–6	19–10	0–1 vs. MIA
7	Georgia Tech	8–8	18–11	1–0 vs. DUKE
8	Duke	8–8	19–11	0–1 vs. GT
9	Virginia	6–10	17–13	1–0 vs. WF
10	Wake Forest	6–10	15–14	0–1 vs. UVA
11	Virginia Tech	5–11	17–12	
12	Pittsburgh	4–12	12–17	1–0 vs. UNC
13	North Carolina	4–12	14–17	0–1 vs. PITT
14	Boston College	2–14	14–15	
15	Clemson	0–16	4–25	
‡ – ACC regular season champions, and tournament No. 1 seed. † – Received a double-bye in the conference tournament. # – Received a single-bye in the conference tournament. Overall records include all games played in the ACC Tournament.

== Schedule ==
Session	Game	Time*	Matchup^{#}	Television	Attendance
First round – Wednesday, March 2
1	1	1:00 pm	#13 North Carolina vs #12 Pittsburgh	ACCRSN	1,123
1	2	3:30 pm	#15 Clemson vs #10 Wake Forest	ACCRSN	1,123
1	3	6:30 pm	#14 Boston College vs #11 Virginia Tech	ACCRSN	1,123
Second round – Thursday, March 3
2	4	11:00 am	#12 Pittsburgh vs #5 Miami (FL)	ACCRSN	2,114
2	5	2:00 pm	#9 Virginia vs #8 Duke	ACCRSN	2,114
3	6	6:00 pm	#10 Wake Forest vs #7 Georgia Tech	ACCRSN	3,374
3	7	8:00 pm	#14 Boston College vs #6 NC State	ACCRSN	3,374
Quarterfinals – Friday, March 4
4	8	11:00 am	#5 Miami (FL) vs #4 Florida State	ACCRSN	3,148
4	9	2:00 pm	#8 Duke vs #1 Notre Dame	ACCRSN	3,148
5	10	6:00 pm	#7 Georgia Tech vs #2 Louisville	ACCRSN	5,034
5	11	8:00 pm	#6 NC State vs #3 Syracuse	ACCRSN	5,034
Semifinals – Saturday, March 5
6	12	12:00 pm	#5 Miami (FL) vs #1 Notre Dame	ESPNU	5,871
6	13	2:30 pm	#3 Syracuse vs. #2 Louisville	ESPNU	5,871
Championship Game – Sunday, March 6
7	14	12:30 pm	#1 Notre Dame vs #3 Syracuse	ESPN	5,017
*Game times in ET. #-Rankings denote tournament seed.

== Bracket ==
First round Wednesday, March 2 ACCRSN
12	Pittsburgh	82^{OT}
13	North Carolina	72
10	Wake Forest	73
15	Clemson	58
11	Virginia Tech	37
14	Boston College	49

Second round Thursday, March 3 ACCRSN
8	Duke	57
9	Virginia	53
5	Miami	77
12	Pittsburgh	55
7	Georgia Tech	67
10	Wake Forest	65
6	NC State	76
14	Boston College	60

Quarterfinals; Friday, March 4 ACCRSN
1	#2 Notre Dame	83
8	Duke	54
4	#14 Florida State	56
5	#21 Miami	74
2	#7 Louisville	60
7	Georgia Tech	50
3	#17 Syracuse	80
6	NC State	61

Semifinals; Saturday, March 5 ESPNU
1	#2 Notre Dame	78
5	#21 Miami	67
2	#7 Louisville	75
3	#17 Syracuse	80

Championship game Sunday, March 6 ESPN
1	#2 Notre Dame	68
3	#17 Syracuse	57

== See also ==
- 2016 ACC men's basketball tournament
