= 2015–16 Louisville Cardinals women's basketball team =

Intercollegiate basketball season

2015–16 Louisville Cardinals women's basketball

NCAA tournament, second round
- Conference: Atlantic Coast Conference

Ranking
- Coaches: No. 14
- AP: No. 8
- Record: 26–8 (15–1 ACC)
- Head coach: Jeff Walz (9th season)
- Assistant coaches: Stephanie Norman; Sam Purcell; Samantha Williams
- Home arena: KFC Yum! Center

2015–16 ACC women's basketball standings
	Conf.				Overall
Team	W		L	PCT	W		L	PCT
No. 2 Notre Dame †	16	–	0	1.000	33	–	2	.943
No. 8 Louisville	15	–	1	.938	26	–	8	.765
No. 14 Syracuse	13	–	3	.813	30	–	8	.789
No. 17 Florida State	13	–	3	.813	25	–	8	.758
No. 19 Miami (FL)	10	–	6	.625	24	–	9	.727
NC State	10	–	6	.625	20	–	11	.645
Duke	8	–	8	.500	20	–	12	.625
Georgia Tech	8	–	8	.500	20	–	13	.606
Virginia	6	–	10	.375	18	–	16	.529
Wake Forest	6	–	10	.375	17	–	16	.515
Virginia Tech	5	–	11	.313	18	–	14	.563
North Carolina	4	–	12	.250	14	–	18	.438
Pittsburgh	4	–	12	.250	13	–	18	.419
Boston College	2	–	14	.125	15	–	16	.484
Clemson	0	–	16	.000	4	–	26	.133
† 2016 ACC tournament winner As of April 5, 2016; Rankings from AP poll

The 2015–16 Louisville Cardinals women's basketball team represented the University of Louisville during the 2015–16 NCAA Division I women's basketball season. The Cardinals, led by ninth-year head coach Jeff Walz, played their home games at the KFC Yum! Center and were in their second year in the Atlantic Coast Conference. They finished the season 26–8, 15–1 in ACC play to finish in second place. They advanced to the semifinals of the ACC women's tournament, where they lost to Syracuse. They received an at-large bid to the NCAA women's tournament, where they defeated Central Arkansas in the first round before losing to DePaul in the second round.

== Roster ==
2015–16 Louisville Cardinals women's basketball team
Players
Coaches

Pos.	#	Name	Height	Year	Previous school	Hometown
F	1	Erin DeGrate	6 ft 4 in (1.93 m)	Fr	La Vega	Waco, Texas
F	2	Myisha Hines-Allen	6 ft 2 in (1.88 m)	So	Montclair	Montclair, New Jersey
F	3	Sam Fuehring	6 ft 3 in (1.91 m)	So	Immaculate Conception	Wanaque, New Jersey
F	4	Mariya Moore	6 ft 0 in (1.83 m)	So	Salesian	Hercules, California
G	5	Taja Cole	5 ft 7 in (1.7 m)	Fr	Salesian	Richmond, Virginia
G	11	Arica Carter	5 ft 8 in (1.73 m)	So	Lloyd C. Bird	Long Beach, California
F	13	Cortnee Walton	6 ft 3 in (1.91 m)	RS Jr	St. Mary's	Surprise, Arizona
G	22	Brianna Jones	5 ft 9 in (1.75 m)	Fr	North Babylon	North Babylon, New York
G	25	Asia Durr	5 ft 10 in (1.78 m)	Fr	St. Pius X Catholic	Douglasville, Georgia
F	31	Sydney Brackemyre	6 ft 1 in (1.85 m)	RS Fr	Clinton Massie School	Wilmington, Ohio

Head coach

- Jeff Walz (Northern Kentucky)

Assistant coach(es)

- Stephanie Norman (Arizona State)
- Sam Purcell (Auburn)
- Samantha Williams (Auburn)

Legend

- (C) Team captain
- (S) Suspended
- (I) Ineligible
- (W) Walk-on
- Injured
- Current redshirt

== Media ==
Select Cardinals games were broadcast on WHAS. Some of the games were on the ACC RSN. Additional ACC games aired on ESPN3.

All Cardinals basketball games aired on Learfield Sports on WKRD 790 AM or WVKY 101.7 FM, depending on conflicts with Louisville and Kentucky football and men's basketball games.

== Schedule ==
Date time, TV	Rank^{#}	Opponent^{#}	Result	Record	Site (attendance) city, state
Regular season
11/15/2015*; 2:00 pm, ESPN3	No. 8	California	L 71–75	0–1	KFC Yum! Center (16,524); Louisville, KY
11/21/2015*; 3:30 pm, FCS	No. 16	at WKU	L 69–71	0–2	E. A. Diddle Arena (3,176); Bowling Green, KY
11/27/2015*; 5:00 pm	No. 22	vs. Marist; Gulf Coast Showcase quarterfinals	W 65–53	1–2	Germain Arena (1,257); Eastero, FL
11/28/2015*; 7:30 pm	No. 22	vs. Purdue; Gulf Coast Showcase semifinals	L 60–62	1–3	Germain Arena (1,407); Eastero, FL
11/29/2015*; 5:00 pm	No. 22	vs. Dayton; Gulf Coast Showcase 3rd place game	L 66–79	1–4	Germain Arena; Eastero, FL
12/03/2015*; 7:00 pm, ESPN2		at No. 19 Michigan State; ACC–Big Ten Women's Challenge	W 85–78	2–4	Breslin Center (5,721); East Lansing, MI
12/05/2015*; 4:00 pm		Valparaiso	W 75–42	3–4	KFC Yum! Center (8,274); Louisville, KY
12/10/2015*; 7:00 pm, SECN		at No. 8 Kentucky; The Battle for the Bluegrass	L 54–72	3–5	Rupp Arena (14,425); Lexington, KY
12/13/2015*; 2:00 pm		IUPUI	W 70–61	4–5	KFC Yum! Center (8,686); Louisville, KY
12/15/2015*; 7:00 pm		Dartmouth	W 94–42	5–5	KFC Yum! Center (7,971); Louisville, KY
12/18/2015*; 7:00 pm		at Tennessee Tech	W 76–54	6–5	Eblen Center (943); Cookeville, TN
12/20/2015*; 2:00 pm		at College of Charleston	W 71–67	7–5	TD Arena (517); Charleston, SC
12/28/2015*; 7:00 pm		Tennessee–Martin	W 88–66	8–5	KFC Yum! Center (8,690); Louisville, KY
01/01/2016; 4:00 pm, ESPNU		No. 15 Florida State	W 79–69	9–5 (1–0)	KFC Yum! Center (9,126); Louisville, KY
01/03/2016; 2:00 pm, ESPN3		at Georgia Tech	W 78–65	10–5 (2–0)	Hank McCamish Pavilion (1,982); Atlanta, GA
01/07/2016; 7:00 pm, ESPN3		Virginia Tech	W 56–45	11–5 (3–0)	KFC Yum! Center (7,891); Louisville, KY
01/10/2016; 1:00 pm, ESPN3		No. 18 Duke	W 65–48	12–5 (4–0)	KFC Yum! Center (11,342); Louisville, KY
01/14/2016; 7:00 pm	No. 23	at Virginia	W 59–41	13–5 (5–0)	John Paul Jones Arena (2,880); Charlottesville, VA
01/17/2016; 2:00 pm	No. 23	at NC State	W 92–90	14–5 (6–0)	Broughton HS (2,313); Raleigh, NC
01/25/2016; 7:00 pm, RSN	No. 14	at Syracuse	W 71–53	15–5 (7–0)	Carrier Dome (549); Syracuse, NY
01/28/2016; 7:00 pm, ESPN3	No. 14	Clemson	W 75–33	16–5 (8–0)	KFC Yum! Center (8,379); Louisville, KY
01/31/2016; 1:00 pm, RSN	No. 14	Wake Forest	W 78–54	17–5 (9–0)	KFC Yum! Center (9,673); Louisville, KY
02/04/2016; 7:00 pm, ESPN3	No. 13	at North Carolina	W 78–60	18–5 (10–0)	Carmichael Arena (2,176); Chapel Hill, NC
02/07/2016; 2:00 pm, ESPN2	No. 13	No. 3 Notre Dame	L 61–66	18–6 (10–1)	KFC Yum! Center (13,837); Louisville, KY
02/11/2016; 7:00 pm, ESPN3	No. 12	at Pittsburgh	W 84–61	19–6 (11–1)	Peterson Events Center (806); Pittsburgh, PA
02/15/2016*; 9:00 pm, ESPN2	No. 11	No. 19 South Florida	W 67–50	20–6	KFC Yum! Center (7,941); Louisville, KY
02/18/2016; 7:00 pm, ESPN3	No. 11	Virginia	W 74–59	21–6 (12–1)	KFC Yum! Center (8,736); Louisville, KY
02/21/2016; 1:00 pm	No. 11	at Boston College	W 55–45	22–6 (13–1)	Conte Forum (1,454); Chestnut Hill, MA
02/27/2016; 7:00 pm, ESPN3	No. 10	at No. 17 Miami (FL)	W 79–51	23–6 (14–1)	BankUnited Center (1,378); Coral Gables, FL
02/28/2016; 12:30 pm, RSN	No. 10	Pittsburgh	W 65–36	24–6 (15–1)	KFC Yum! Center (11,641); Louisville, KY
ACC Women's Tournament
03/04/2016; 6:00 pm, RSN	No. 7	vs. Georgia Tech; Quarterfinals	W 60–50	25–6	Greensboro Coliseum; Greensboro, NC
03/05/2016; 2:30 pm, ESPNU	No. 7	vs. No. 17 Syracuse; Semifinals	L 75–80	25–7	Greensboro Coliseum (5,871); Greensboro, NC
NCAA Women's Tournament
03/18/2016*; 2:30 pm, ESPN2	(3 D) No. 8	(14 D) Central Arkansas; First Round	W 87–60	26–7	KFC Yum! Center (5,823); Louisville, KY
03/20/2016*; 2:30 pm, ESPN2	(3 D) No. 8	(6 D) No. 20 DePaul; Second Round	L 72–73	26–8	KFC Yum! Center (7,515); Louisville, KY
*Non-conference game. ^{#}Rankings from AP Poll. (#) Tournament seedings in parentheses. D=Dallas Region. All times are in Eastern.

== Rankings ==
Regular season polls
Poll	Pre- season	Week 2	Week 3	Week 4	Week 5	Week 6	Week 7	Week 8	Week 9	Week 10	Week 11	Week 12	Week 13	Week 14	Week 15	Week 16	Week 17	Week 18	Week 19	Final
AP	8	16	22	NR	RV	NR	NR	NR	RV	23	17	14	13	12	11	10	7	8	8	N/A
Coaches	8	16	RV	NR	NR	NR	NR	NR	RV	22	17	14	13	12	11	10	6	8	8	14

Legend
	Increase in ranking
	Decrease in ranking
	Not ranked previous week
(RV)	Received votes

== See also ==
- Louisville Cardinals women's basketball
- 2015–16 Louisville Cardinals men's basketball team
