= 2015–16 Virginia Cavaliers women's basketball team =

Intercollegiate basketball season

2015–16 Virginia Cavaliers women's basketball

WNIT, Third Round
- Conference: Atlantic Coast Conference
- Record: 18–16 (6–10 ACC)
- Head coach: Joanne Boyle (5th season)
- Assistant coaches: Kim McNeill; La'Keshia Frett Meredith; Cory McNeill
- Home arena: John Paul Jones Arena

2015–16 ACC women's basketball standings
	Conf.				Overall
Team	W		L	PCT	W		L	PCT
No. 2 Notre Dame †	16	–	0	1.000	33	–	2	.943
No. 8 Louisville	15	–	1	.938	26	–	8	.765
No. 14 Syracuse	13	–	3	.813	30	–	8	.789
No. 17 Florida State	13	–	3	.813	25	–	8	.758
No. 19 Miami (FL)	10	–	6	.625	24	–	9	.727
NC State	10	–	6	.625	20	–	11	.645
Duke	8	–	8	.500	20	–	12	.625
Georgia Tech	8	–	8	.500	20	–	13	.606
Virginia	6	–	10	.375	18	–	16	.529
Wake Forest	6	–	10	.375	17	–	16	.515
Virginia Tech	5	–	11	.313	18	–	14	.563
North Carolina	4	–	12	.250	14	–	18	.438
Pittsburgh	4	–	12	.250	13	–	18	.419
Boston College	2	–	14	.125	15	–	16	.484
Clemson	0	–	16	.000	4	–	26	.133
† 2016 ACC tournament winner As of April 5, 2016; Rankings from AP poll

The 2015–16 Virginia Cavaliers women's basketball team represented the University of Virginia during the 2015–16 college basketball season. The Cavalier were led by fifth year head coach Joanne Boyle. The Cavaliers were members of the Atlantic Coast Conference and played their home games at the John Paul Jones Arena. They finished the season 17–16, 6–10 in ACC play to finish in a tie for ninth place. They lost in the second round of the ACC women's tournament to Duke. They were invited to the Women's National Invitation Tournament, where they defeated VCU and Rutgers in the first and second rounds before losing to Hofstra in the third round.

== 2015–16 media ==
=== Virginia Cavaliers Sports Network ===
The Virginia Cavaliers Sports Network will broadcast select Cavaliers games on WINA. John Freeman, Larry Johnson, and Myron Ripley will provide the call for the games. Games not broadcast on WINA can be listened to online through Cavaliers Live at virginiasports.com.

== Roster ==
2015–16 Virginia Cavaliers women's basketball team
Players
Coaches

Pos.	#	Name	Height	Year	Previous school	Hometown
C	00	Debra Ferguson	6 ft 4 in (1.93 m)	Fr	Amherst County	Madison Heights, VA
G	1	Mikayla Venson	5 ft 7 in (1.7 m)	So	Yorktown	Arlington, VA
F	2	Jae'Lisa Allen	6 ft 2 in (1.88 m)	So	White Hall	Pine Bluff, AR
G	10	J'Kyra Brown	5 ft 11 in (1.8 m)	RS So	Rocky Mount; East Carolina	Rocky Mount, NC
G	12	Breyana Mason	5 ft 8 in (1.73 m)	Jr	Forest Park	Woodbridge, VA
F	13	Emily Battle	6 ft 1 in (1.85 m)	Fr	St. Anne's-Belfield	Charlottesville, VA
G	20	Faith Randolph	5 ft 10 in (1.78 m)	Sr	Our Lady of Good Counsel	Derwood, MD
F	21	Lauren Moses	6 ft 2 in (1.88 m)	So	Rancocas	Mt. Holly, NJ
G	23	Aliyah Huland El	6 ft 1 in (1.85 m)	So	Randolph	Randolph, NJ
F	32	Moné Jones	6 ft 3 in (1.91 m)	Fr	Riverside	Durham, NC
F	35	Shakyna Payne	6 ft 3 in (1.91 m)	Fr	Southwest Atlanta Christian Academy	Acworth, GA
F	44	Sydney Umeri	6 ft 1 in (1.85 m)	Jr	The Lovett School	Acworth, GA

Head coach

- Joanne Boyle (Duke)

Assistant coach(es)

- Kim McNeill (Richmond)
- La'Keisha Frett Meredith (Georgia)
- Cory McNeill (Morgan State)

Legend

- (C) Team captain
- (S) Suspended
- (I) Ineligible
- (W) Walk-on
- Injured
- Current redshirt

Roster
Last update: 2015-10-21

== Schedule ==
Date time, TV	Rank^{#}	Opponent^{#}	Result	Record	Site (attendance) city, state
Non-conference regular season
November 13*; 6:30 pm		at Middle Tennessee	W 70–66	1–0	Murphy Center (5,613); Murfreesboro, TN
November 16*; 7:00 pm		Norfolk State	W 86–50	2–0	John Paul Jones Arena (3,495); Charlottesville, VA
November 19*; 7:00 pm, SECN		at Auburn	W 69–52	3–0	Auburn Arena (1,675); Auburn, AL
November 22*; 2:00 pm		Longwood	W 81–46	4–0	John Paul Jones Arena (3,616); Charlottesville, VA
November 26*; 1:00 pm		vs. Green Bay; Paradise Jam tournament Island Division	W 68–59	5–0	Sports and Fitness Center; Saint Thomas, USVI
November 27*; 3:15 pm		vs. Rutgers; Paradise Jam Tournament Island Division	L 48–60	5–1	Sports and Fitness Center; Saint Thomas, USVI
November 28*; 1:00 pm		vs. Tulane; Paradise Jam Tournament Island Division	L 62–67	5–2	Sports and Fitness Center; Saint Thomas, USVI
December 2*; 7:00 pm		Iowa; ACC–Big Ten Women's Challenge	L 73–85	5–3	John Paul Jones Arena (3,360); Charlottesville, VA
December 5*; 7:00 pm		NJIT	W 81–54	6–3	John Paul Jones Arena (3,268); Charlottesville, VA
December 8*; 11:00 am		Bowling Green	W 68–39	7–3	John Paul Jones Arena (10,048); Charlottesville, VA
December 18*; 7:00 pm		Charleston Southern	W 85–65	8–3	John Paul Jones Arena (2,975); Charlottesville, VA
December 21*; 7:00 pm		at No. 9 Ohio State	L 73–93	8–4	Value City Arena (4,778); Columbus, OH
December 28*; 7:00 pm		Coppin State; Cavalier Classic Tournament	W 75–40	9–4	John Paul Jones Arena (3,062); Charlottesville, VA
December 29*; 7:00 pm		Richmond; Cavalier Classic Tournament	W 71–51	10–4	John Paul Jones Arena (3,190); Charlottesville, VA
Conference regular season
January 3; 1:00 pm, RSN		No. 22 Miami (FL)	W 76–56	11–4 (1–0)	John Paul Jones Arena (3,656); Charlottesville, VA
January 7; 7:00 pm		No. 3 Notre Dame	L 46–74	11–5 (1–1)	John Paul Jones Arena (3,394); Charlottesville, VA
January 10; 2:00 pm		at Wake Forest	W 52–50	12–5 (2–1)	LJVM Coliseum (875); Winston-Salem, NC
January 14; 7:00 pm		No. 23 Louisville	L 41–59	12–6 (2–2)	John Paul Jones Arena (2,880); Charlottesville, VA
January 17; 2:00 pm, ESPN3		at Georgia Tech	W 78–67	13–6 (3–2)	Hank McCamish Pavilion (1,041); Atlanta, GA
January 21; 7:00 pm		at No. 14 Florida State	L 48–70	13–7 (3–3)	Donald L. Tucker Civic Center (2,495); Tallahassee, FL
January 24; 1:00 pm, RSN		Pittsburgh	L 55–58	13–8 (3–4)	John Paul Jones Arena (2,895); Charlottesville, VA
January 27; 7:30 pm		at NC State	L 52–63	13–9 (3–5)	Broughton HS (1,499); Raleigh, NC
February 4; 7:00 pm, ESPN3		at Duke	L 52–67	13–10 (3–6)	Cameron Indoor Stadium (4,506); Durham, NC
February 7; 2:00 pm		Virginia Tech; Commonwealth Classic	L 46–66	13–11 (3–7)	John Paul Jones Arena (4,052); Charlottesville, VA
February 11; 7:00 pm, RSN		Syracuse	L 57–91	13–12 (3–8)	John Paul Jones Arena (3,081); Charlottesville, VA
February 14; 5:00 pm, RSN		at Boston College	W 61–50	14–12 (4–8)	Conte Forum (522); Chestnut Hill, MA
February 18; 7:00 pm, ESPN3		at No. 11 Louisville	L 59–74	14–13 (4–9)	KFC Yum! Center (8,736); Louisville, KY
February 21; 1:00 pm, RSN		Clemson	W 65–48	15–13 (5–9)	John Paul Jones Arena (5,012); Charlottesville, VA
February 25; 7:00 pm, RSN		North Carolina	W 72–68	16–13 (6–9)	John Paul Jones Arena (3,109); Charlottesville, VA
February 28; 2:00 pm, ESPN3		at Virginia Tech; Commonwealth Classic	L 55–60	16–14 (6–10)	Cassell Coliseum (2,710); Blacksburg, VA
ACC Women's tournament
March 3; 2:00 pm, RSN		vs. Duke; Second Round	L 53–57	16–15	Greensboro Coliseum (2,114); Greensboro, NC
WNIT
March 17*; 7:00 pm		at VCU; First Round	W 52–50	17–15	Siegel Center (859); Richmond, VA
March 20*; 7:00 pm		at Rutgers; Second Round	W 71–55	18–15	The RAC (597); Piscataway, NJ
March 22*; 7:00 pm		at Hofstra; Third Round	L 57–65	18–16	Hofstra Arena (344); Hempstead, NY
*Non-conference game. ^{#}Rankings from AP Poll. (#) Tournament seedings in parentheses. All times are in Eastern.

== Rankings ==
Regular season polls
Poll	Pre- Season	Week 2	Week 3	Week 4	Week 5	Week 6	Week 7	Week 8	Week 9	Week 10	Week 11	Week 12	Week 13	Week 14	Week 15	Week 16	Week 17	Week 18	Week 19	Final
AP	NR	NR	NR	NR	NR	NR	NR	NR	NR	NR	NR	NR	NR	NR	NR	NR	NR	NR	NR	N/A
Coaches	RV	RV	RV	NR	NR	NR	NR	NR	NR	RV	RV	NR	NR	NR	NR	NR	NR	NR	NR	NR

Legend
	Increase in ranking
	Decrease in ranking
	Not ranked previous week
(RV)	Received Votes

== See also ==
- 2015–16 Virginia Cavaliers men's basketball team
