= 2015–16 Virginia Tech Hokies women's basketball team =

Intercollegiate basketball season

2015–16 Virginia Tech Hokies women's basketball

WNIT, Second Round
- Conference: Atlantic Coast Conference
- Record: 18–14 (5–11 ACC)
- Head coach: Dennis Wolff (5th season)
- Assistant coaches: Bill Dooley; Heather Vulin; Britney Anderson
- Home arena: Cassell Coliseum

2015–16 ACC women's basketball standings
	Conf.				Overall
Team	W		L	PCT	W		L	PCT
No. 2 Notre Dame †	16	–	0	1.000	33	–	2	.943
No. 8 Louisville	15	–	1	.938	26	–	8	.765
No. 14 Syracuse	13	–	3	.813	30	–	8	.789
No. 17 Florida State	13	–	3	.813	25	–	8	.758
No. 19 Miami (FL)	10	–	6	.625	24	–	9	.727
NC State	10	–	6	.625	20	–	11	.645
Duke	8	–	8	.500	20	–	12	.625
Georgia Tech	8	–	8	.500	20	–	13	.606
Virginia	6	–	10	.375	18	–	16	.529
Wake Forest	6	–	10	.375	17	–	16	.515
Virginia Tech	5	–	11	.313	18	–	14	.563
North Carolina	4	–	12	.250	14	–	18	.438
Pittsburgh	4	–	12	.250	13	–	18	.419
Boston College	2	–	14	.125	15	–	16	.484
Clemson	0	–	16	.000	4	–	26	.133
† 2016 ACC tournament winner As of April 5, 2016; Rankings from AP poll

The 2015–16 Virginia Tech Hokies women's basketball team represented Virginia Polytechnic Institute and State University during the 2015–16 college basketball season. The Hokies, led by fifth year head coach Dennis Wolff, were members of the Atlantic Coast Conference and played their home games at the Cassell Coliseum. They finished the season 18–14, 5–11 in ACC play to finish in eleventh place. They lost in the first round of the ACC women's tournament to Boston College. They were invited to the Women's National Invitation Tournament, where they defeated Elon in the first round before losing to Ohio in the second round.

On March 22, 2016, the school fired head coach Dennis Wolff. He finished at Virginia Tech with a 5 year record of 62–93.

== 2015–16 media ==
=== Virginia Tech Hokies Sports Network ===
The Virginia Tech Hokies IMG Sports Network broadcast Hokies games on WNMX. Andrew Allegretta provided the call for the games and for select ESPN3 games. All WNMX games and games not on WNMX could be heard online through HokiesXtra.

== Roster ==
2015–16 Virginia Tech Hokies women's basketball team
Players
Coaches

Pos.	#	Name	Height	Year	Previous school	Hometown
F	1	Erinn Brooks	5 ft 9 in (1.75 m)	Fr	Franklin County	Union Hall, VA
F	2	Sidney Cook	6 ft 2 in (1.88 m)	Jr	South View; Seton Hall	Parkton, NC
F	4	Hannah Young	6 ft 1 in (1.85 m)	Sr	St. Francis Xavier College	Newcastle, Australia
G	5	Vanessa Panousis	5 ft 7 in (1.7 m)	Jr	Brigidine College Randwick	Sydney, Australia
F	11	Regan Magarity	6 ft 3 in (1.91 m)	RS Fr	Igelstavikens Gymnasium	Norrköping, Sweden
G	12	Chanette Hicks	5 ft 6 in (1.68 m)	Fr	Maury	Norfolk, VA
F	20	Heidi Brown	6 ft 0 in (1.83 m)	Fr	Sherando	Winchester, VA
F	22	Alana Gilmer	6 ft 0 in (1.83 m)	Fr	Archbishop Williams	North Easton, MA
G	23	Rachel Camp	5 ft 11 in (1.8 m)	So	East Rutherford	Forest City, NC
F	24	Taijah Campbell	6 ft 3 in (1.91 m)	Sr	Pickering	Toronto, ON
G	25	Samantha Hill	5 ft 10 in (1.78 m)	Jr	Eastern Commerce	Toronto, ON
F	33	Kelly Koshuta	6 ft 2 in (1.88 m)	Fr	James Madison	Vienna, VA
C	35	Tara Nahodil	6 ft 4 in (1.93 m)	Jr	Tri-Valley	Pine Grove, PA
F	40	Dominique Powell	6 ft 3 in (1.91 m)	Sr	Archbishop Carroll/Gulf Coast State	Washington, D.C.
F/C	45	Khadedra Croker	6 ft 2 in (1.88 m)	So	King's Fork	Suffolk, VA

Head coach

- Dennis Wolff (Connecticut)

Assistant coach(es)

- Bill Dooley (Richmond)
- Heather Vulin (Minnesota Morris)
- Britney Anderson (Virginia Tech)

Legend

- (C) Team captain
- (S) Suspended
- (I) Ineligible
- (W) Walk-on
- Injured
- Current redshirt

Roster
Last update: 2014-09-13

== Schedule ==
Date time, TV	Rank^{#}	Opponent^{#}	Result	Record	Site (attendance) city, state
Non-conference regular season
11/13/2015*; 7:00 pm		Presbyterian	W 58–44	1–0	Cassell Coliseum (1,611); Blacksburg, VA
11/15/2015*; 5:00 pm		George Mason	W 80–63	2–0	Cassell Coliseum (1,172); Blacksburg, VA
11/18/2015*; 7:00 pm		at Georgetown	L 56–73	2–1	McDonough Gymnasium (781); Washington, D.C.
11/20/2015*; 5:00 pm		Providence	W 62–46	3–1	Cassell Coliseum (1,253); Blacksburg, VA
11/22/2015*; 5:00 pm		College of Charleston	W 81–47	4–1	Cassell Coliseum (1,136); Blacksburg, VA
11/25/2015*; 7:00 pm		Wofford	W 73–42	5–1	Cassell Coliseum (1,077); Blacksburg, VA
12/03/2015*; 8:00 pm, BTN		at Penn State; ACC–Big Ten Women's Challenge	W 64–59	6–1	Bryce Jordan Center (2,897); University Park, PA
12/06/2015*; 2:00 pm, SECN		at No. 8 Tennessee	W 57–43	7–1	Thompson–Boling Arena (9,431); Knoxville, TN
12/09/2015*; 7:00 pm		Morgan State	W 77–33	8–1	Cassell Coliseum (1,004); Blacksburg, VA
12/13/2015*; 12:00 pm		Coppin State	W 72–39	9–1	Cassell Coliseum (1,093); Blacksburg, VA
12/19/2015*; 3:00 pm		Mount St. Mary's	W 59–42	10–1	Cassell Coliseum (1,239); Blacksburg, VA
12/21/2015*; 1:00 pm		Radford	W 47–40	11–1	Cassell Coliseum (1,547); Blacksburg, VA
12/30/2015*; 3:00 pm		Furman	W 59–30	12–1	Cassell Coliseum (1,415); Blacksburg, VA
ACC regular season
01/03/2016; 2:00 pm		Boston College	W 58–33	13–1 (1–0)	Cassell Coliseum (1,433); Blacksburg, VA
01/07/2016; 7:00 pm, ESPN3		at Louisville	L 45–56	13–2 (1–1)	KFC Yum! Center (7,891); Louisville, KY
01/10/2016; 2:00 pm		at Syracuse	L 39–60	13–3 (1–2)	Carrier Dome (1,961); Syracuse, NY
01/18/2016; 7:00 pm, RSN		Clemson	W 79–49	14–3 (2–2)	Cassell Coliseum (1,565); Blacksburg, VA
01/21/2016; 7:00 pm, RSN		NC State	L 61–72	14–4 (2–3)	Cassell Coliseum (1,475); Blacksburg, VA
01/24/2016; 1:00 pm		at No. 3 Notre Dame	L 41–80	14–5 (2–4)	Edmund P. Joyce Center (8,958); South Bend, IN
01/28/2016; 7:00 pm		No. 17 Miami (FL)	L 45–57	14–6 (2–5)	Cassell Coliseum (1,447); Blacksburg, VA
01/31/2016; 2:00 pm		at Florida State	L 50–68	14–7 (2–6)	Donald L. Tucker Civic Center (3,017); Tallahassee, FL
02/04/2016; 7:00 pm		Georgia Tech	L 34–51	14–8 (2–7)	Cassell Coliseum (1,818); Blacksburg, VA
02/07/2016; 2:00 pm		at Virginia; Commonwealth Classic	W 66–46	15–8 (3–7)	John Paul Jones Arena (4,052); Charlottesville, VA
02/11/2016; 7:00 pm		at North Carolina	L 67–71	15–9 (3–8)	Carmichael Arena (1,752); Chapel Hill, NC
02/14/2016; 2:00 pm		Pittsburgh	L 48–59	15–10 (3–9)	Cassell Coliseum (2,143); Blacksburg, VA
02/18/2016; 7:00 pm, ESPN3		Duke	L 62–66	15–11 (3–10)	Cassell Coliseum (1,264); Blacksburg, VA
02/21/2016; 4:00 pm, ESPN3		at No. 18 Miami (FL)	L 56–67 ^{OT}	15–12 (3–11)	BankUnited Center (2,180); Coral Gables, FL
02/25/2016; 7:00 pm		Wake Forest	W 54–48	16–12 (4–11)	LJVM Coliseum (679); Winston-Salem, NC
02/28/2016; 2:00 pm, ESPN3		Virginia; Commonwealth Classic	W 60–55	17–12 (5–11)	Cassell Coliseum (2,710); Blacksburg, VA
ACC Women's Tournament
03/02/2016; 6:30 pm, RSN		vs. Boston College; First Round	L 37–49	17–13	Greensboro Coliseum (1,123); Greensboro, NC
WNIT
03/17/2016*; 7:00 pm		Elon; First Round	W 68–59	18–13	Cassell Coliseum (657); Blacksburg, VA
03/20/2016*; 2:00 pm		at Ohio; Second Round	L 57–64	18–14	Convention Center (1,131); Athens, OH
*Non-conference game. ^{#}Rankings from AP Poll. (#) Tournament seedings in parentheses. All times are in Eastern.

== Rankings ==
2015–16 NCAA Division I women's basketball rankings

Regular season polls
Poll	Pre- Season	Week 2	Week 3	Week 4	Week 5	Week 6	Week 7	Week 8	Week 9	Week 10	Week 11	Week 12	Week 13	Week 14	Week 15	Week 16	Week 17	Week 18	Week 19	Final
AP	NR	NR	NR	NR	RV	RV	RV	RV	RV	NR	NR	NR	NR	NR	NR	NR	NR	NR	NR	NR
Coaches	NR	NR	NR	NR	RV	RV	RV	RV	RV	RV	RV	NR	NR	NR	NR	NR	NR	NR	NR	N/A

Legend
	Increase in ranking
	Decrease in ranking
	Not ranked previous week
(RV)	Received Votes

== See also ==
- 2015–16 Virginia Tech Hokies men's basketball team
