= 2015–16 Notre Dame Fighting Irish women's basketball team =

Intercollegiate basketball season

2015–16 Notre Dame Fighting Irish women's basketball

ACC tournament champions ACC regular season champions Junkanoo Jam Freeport Division champions

NCAA tournament, Sweet Sixteen
- Conference: Atlantic Coast Conference

Ranking
- Coaches: No. 6
- AP: No. 2
- Record: 33–2 (16–0 ACC)
- Head coach: Muffet McGraw (29th season)
- Assistant coaches: Carol Owens; Beth Cunningham; Niele Ivey
- Home arena: Edmund P. Joyce Center

2015–16 ACC women's basketball standings
	Conf.				Overall
Team	W		L	PCT	W		L	PCT
No. 2 Notre Dame †	16	–	0	1.000	33	–	2	.943
No. 8 Louisville	15	–	1	.938	26	–	8	.765
No. 14 Syracuse	13	–	3	.813	30	–	8	.789
No. 17 Florida State	13	–	3	.813	25	–	8	.758
No. 19 Miami (FL)	10	–	6	.625	24	–	9	.727
NC State	10	–	6	.625	20	–	11	.645
Duke	8	–	8	.500	20	–	12	.625
Georgia Tech	8	–	8	.500	20	–	13	.606
Virginia	6	–	10	.375	18	–	16	.529
Wake Forest	6	–	10	.375	17	–	16	.515
Virginia Tech	5	–	11	.313	18	–	14	.563
North Carolina	4	–	12	.250	14	–	18	.438
Pittsburgh	4	–	12	.250	13	–	18	.419
Boston College	2	–	14	.125	15	–	16	.484
Clemson	0	–	16	.000	4	–	26	.133
† 2016 ACC tournament winner As of April 5, 2016; Rankings from AP poll

The 2015–16 Notre Dame Fighting Irish women's basketball team represented University of Notre Dame during the 2015–16 NCAA Division I women's basketball season. The Fighting Irish, led by twenty-ninth year head coach Muffet McGraw, play their home games at Edmund P. Joyce Center and were third year members of the Atlantic Coast Conference. They finished the season with 33–2, 16–0 in ACC play to win both of the ACC Regular Season and Tournament. They earn an automatic bid to the NCAA women's tournament, where they defeat North Carolina A&T and Indiana in both the first and second rounds before losing to Stanford in the sweet sixteen, which ended 5 straight Final Four appearances.

== Roster ==
2015–16 Notre Dame Fighting Irish women's basketball team
Players
Coaches

Pos.	#	Name	Height	Year	Previous school	Hometown
G	2	Arike Ogunbowale	5 ft 8 in (1.73 m)	Fr	Divine Savior Holy Angels	Milwaukee, WI
G	3	Marina Mabrey	5 ft 11 in (1.8 m)	Fr	Manasquan	Belmar, NJ
F	11	Brianna Turner	6 ft 3 in (1.91 m)	So	Manvel	Pearland, TX
F	12	Taya Reimer (injured)	6 ft 4 in (1.93 m)	Jr	Hamilton Southeastern	Fishers, IN
G	14	Mychael Johnson	5 ft 7 in (1.7 m)	So	Huntington St. Joseph	Huntington, WV
G	15	Lindsay Allen	5 ft 8 in (1.73 m)	Jr	St. John's College	Michelleville, MD
G	20	Ali Patberg (injured)	5 ft 10 in (1.78 m)	Fr	Columbus North	Columbus, IN
F	21	Kristina Nelson	6 ft 4 in (1.93 m)	RS So	Buford	Buford, GA
F	22	Madison Cable	5 ft 10 in (1.78 m)	RS Sr	Mt. Lebanon	Mt. Lebanon, PA
G	23	Michaela Mabrey	5 ft 10 in (1.78 m)	Sr	Manasquan	Belmar, NJ
G	24	Hannah Huffman	5 ft 9 in (1.75 m)	Sr	Carondelet	Diablo, CA
F	33	Kathryn Westbeld	6 ft 2 in (1.88 m)	So	Ketting Fairmount	Kettering, OH
C	35	Diamond Thompson	6 ft 5 in (1.96 m)	Jr	Wheaton Warrenville South	Wheaton, IL

Head coach

Muffet McGraw (Saint Joseph's)

Assistant coach(es)

Carol Owens (Northern Illinois)
Beth Cunningham (Notre Dame)
Niele Ivey (Notre Dame)

Legend

- (C) Team captain
- (S) Suspended
- (I) Ineligible
- (W) Walk-on
- Injured
- Current redshirt

Roster

== Media ==
All Notre Dame games will air on WHPZ Pulse 96.9 FM. Games are streamed online live.

== Rankings ==
Regular season polls
Poll	Pre- Season	Week 2	Week 3	Week 4	Week 5	Week 6	Week 7	Week 8	Week 9	Week 10	Week 11	Week 12	Week 13	Week 14	Week 15	Week 16	Week 17	Week 18	Week 19	Final
AP	3	3	3	3	3	3	3	3	3	3	3	3	3	3	2	2	2	2	2	N/A
Coaches	3	3	3	3	3	3	3	3	3	3	3	3	3	3	3	3	3	3	3	6

Legend
	Increase in ranking
	Decrease in ranking
	Not ranked previous week
(RV)	Received Votes

== Schedule ==
Date time, TV	Rank^{#}	Opponent^{#}	Result	Record	Site (attendance) city, state
Exhibition
11/07/2015*; 1:00 pm	No. 3	Wayne State	W 101–52		Edmund P. Joyce Center (8,088); South Bend, IN
Regular season
11/15/2015*; 1:00 pm	No. 3	Bucknell	W 85–54	1–0	Edmund P. Joyce Center (8,948); South Bend, IN
11/18/2015*; 7:00 pm, ESPN3	No. 3	Toledo	W 74–39	2–0	Edmund P. Joyce Center (8,474); South Bend, IN
11/21/2015*; 3:00 pm, ESPN3	No. 3	at South Dakota State	W 75–64	3–0	Frost Arena (5,532); Brookings, SD
11/23/2015*; 8:00 pm, ESPN3	No. 3	at Valparaiso	W 110–54	4–0	Athletics–Recreation Center (1,371); Valparaiso, IN
11/27/2015*; 3:15 pm	No. 3	vs. Denver; Junkanoo Jam Freeport Division semifinals	W 94–52	5–0	St. Georges High School (375); Grand Bahama Island
11/28/2015*; 3:15 pm	No. 3	vs. UCLA; Junkanoo Jam Freeport Division championship	W 92–84 ^{OT}	6–0	St. Georges High School (683); Grand Bahama Island
12/02/2015*; 7:00 pm, ESPN3	No. 3	No. 10 Ohio State; ACC–Big Ten Women's Challenge	W 75–72	7–0	Edmund P. Joyce Center (8,609); South Bend, IN
12/05/2015*; 5:15 pm, ESPN	No. 3	at No. 1 Connecticut; Jimmy V Classic/Rivalry	L 81–91	7–1	Gampel Pavilion (10,167); Storrs, CT
12/09/2015*; 7:00 pm, ESPN3	No. 3	No. 18 DePaul	W 95–90	8–1	Edmund P. Joyce Center (8,207); South Bend, IN
12/12/2015*; 12:00 pm, FSN	No. 3	at TCU	W 88–72	9–1	University Recreation Center (1,628); Fort Worth, TX
12/21/2015*; 7:00 pm	No. 3	at Saint Joseph's	W 91–55	10–1	Hagan Arena (3,411); Philadelphia, PA
12/28/2015*; 7:00 pm, ESPN3	No. 3	No. 10 Oregon State	W 62–61	11–1	Edmund P. Joyce Center (8,860); South Bend, IN
12/30/2015; 7:00 pm	No. 3	Georgia Tech	W 85–76	12–1 (1–0)	Edmund P. Joyce Center (9,149); South Bend, IN
01/03/2016; 3:00 pm, RSN	No. 3	at Pittsburgh	W 65–55	13–1 (2–0)	Peterson Events Center (3,610); Pittsburgh, PA
01/07/2016; 7:00 pm	No. 3	at Virginia	W 74–46	14–1 (3–0)	John Paul Jones Arena (3,394); Charlottesville, VA
01/10/2016; 1:00 pm, ESPN2	No. 3	North Carolina	W 88–54	15–1 (4–0)	Edmund P. Joyce Center (8,942); South Bend, IN
01/14/2016; 7:00 pm	No. 3	at Boston College	W 63–50	16–1 (5–0)	Conte Forum (1,179); Chestnut Hill, MA
01/18/2016*; 7:00 pm, ESPN2	No. 3	No. 18 Tennessee	W 79–66	17–1	Edmund P. Joyce Center (8,961); South Bend, IN
01/21/2016; 7:00 pm, ESPN3	No. 3	Syracuse	W 90–62	18–1 (6–0)	Edmund P. Joyce Center (8,312); South Bend, IN
01/24/2016; 1:00 pm	No. 3	Virginia Tech	W 80–41	19–1 (7–0)	Edmund P. Joyce Center (8,958); South Bend, IN
01/28/2016; 7:00 pm, RSN	No. 3	at Georgia Tech	W 54–42	20–1 (8–0)	Hank McCamish Pavilion (1,908); Atlanta, GA
02/01/2016; 7:00 pm, ESPN2	No. 3	at Duke	W 68–61	21–1 (9–0)	Cameron Indoor Stadium (5,159); Durham, NC
02/04/2016; 7:00 pm, ESPN3	No. 3	NC State	W 82–46	22–1 (10–0)	Edmund P. Joyce Center (8,835); South Bend, IN
02/07/2016; 2:00 pm, ESPN2	No. 3	at No. 13 Louisville	W 66–61	23–1 (11–0)	KFC Yum! Center (13,837); Louisville, KY
02/14/2016; 1:00 pm, RSN	No. 3	No. 19 Miami (FL)	W 90–69	24–1 (12–0)	Edmund P. Joyce Center (9,149); South Bend, IN
02/18/2016; 7:00 pm	No. 2	at Wake Forest	W 86–52	25–1 (13–0)	LJVM Coliseum (692); Winston-Salem, NC
02/22/2016; 7:00 pm, ESPN2	No. 2	at No. 12 Florida State	W 73–66	26–1 (14–0)	Donald L. Tucker Civic Center (5,319); Tallahassee, FL
02/25/2016; 7:00 pm	No. 2	Clemson	W 71–52	27–1 (15–0)	Edmund P. Joyce Center (8,378); South Bend, IN
02/27/2016; 1:00 pm	No. 2	Boston College	W 70–48	28–1 (16–0)	Edmund P. Joyce Center (9,149); South Bend, IN
ACC Women's Tournament
03/04/2016; 2:00 pm, RSN	No. 2	vs. Duke; Quarterfinals	W 83–54	29–1	Greensboro Coliseum (3,148); Greensboro, NC
03/05/2016; 12:00 pm, ESPNU	No. 2	vs. No. 21 Miami (FL); Semifinals	W 78–67	30–1	Greensboro Coliseum; Greensboro, NC
03/06/2016; 12:30 pm, ESPN	No. 2	vs. No. 17 Syracuse; Championship Game	W 68–57	31–1	Greensboro Coliseum (5,017); Greensboro, NC
NCAA Women's Tournament
03/19/2016*; 6:30 pm, ESPN2	(1 L) No. 2	(16 L) North Carolina A&T; First round	W 95–61	32–1	Edmund P. Joyce Center (6,310); South Bend, IN
03/21/2016*; 6:30 pm, ESPN2	(1 L) No. 2	(9 L) Indiana; Second round	W 87–70	33–1	Edmund P. Joyce Center (5,750); South Bend, IN
03/25/2016*; 9:30 pm, ESPN	(1 L) No. 2	vs. (4 L) No. 13 Stanford; Sweet Sixteen	L 84–90	33–2	Rupp Arena (8,509); Lexington, KY
*Non-conference game. ^{#}Rankings from AP Poll. (#) Tournament seedings in parentheses. L=Lexington Region. All times are in Eastern.

== See also ==
- 2015–16 Notre Dame Fighting Irish men's basketball team
