= 2015–16 North Carolina Tar Heels women's basketball team =

Intercollegiate basketball season

2015–16 North Carolina Tar Heels women's basketball
- Conference: Atlantic Coast Conference
- Record: 14–18 (4–12 ACC)
- Head coach: Sylvia Hatchell (30th season)
- Assistant coaches: Andrew Calder; Tracey Williams-Johnson; Sylvia Crawley
- Home arena: Carmichael Arena

2015–16 ACC women's basketball standings
	Conf.				Overall
Team	W		L	PCT	W		L	PCT
No. 2 Notre Dame †	16	–	0	1.000	33	–	2	.943
No. 8 Louisville	15	–	1	.938	26	–	8	.765
No. 14 Syracuse	13	–	3	.813	30	–	8	.789
No. 17 Florida State	13	–	3	.813	25	–	8	.758
No. 19 Miami (FL)	10	–	6	.625	24	–	9	.727
NC State	10	–	6	.625	20	–	11	.645
Duke	8	–	8	.500	20	–	12	.625
Georgia Tech	8	–	8	.500	20	–	13	.606
Virginia	6	–	10	.375	18	–	16	.529
Wake Forest	6	–	10	.375	17	–	16	.515
Virginia Tech	5	–	11	.313	18	–	14	.563
North Carolina	4	–	12	.250	14	–	18	.438
Pittsburgh	4	–	12	.250	13	–	18	.419
Boston College	2	–	14	.125	15	–	16	.484
Clemson	0	–	16	.000	4	–	26	.133
† 2016 ACC tournament winner As of April 5, 2016; Rankings from AP poll

The 2015–16 North Carolina Tar Heels women's basketball team represented the University of North Carolina at Chapel Hill during the 2015–16 NCAA Division I women's basketball season. The Tar Heels, led by thirtieth-year head coach Sylvia Hatchell, played their games at Carmichael Arena and were members of the Atlantic Coast Conference. They finished the season 14–18, 4–12 in ACC play to finish in a tie for twelfth place. They lost in the first round of the ACC women's tournament to Pittsburgh.

== Roster ==
2015–16 North Carolina Tar Heels women's basketball team
Players
Coaches

Pos.	#	Name	Height	Year	Previous school	Hometown
F	1	Rachael McGirt	6 ft 2 in (1.88 m)	Sr	Jordan	Durham, NC
G	5	Stephanie Watts	5 ft 11 in (1.8 m)	Fr	Weddington	Wesley Chapel, NC
G	10	Jamie Cherry	5 ft 8 in (1.73 m)	So	West Craven	Cove City, NC
F	13	Hillary Fuller	6 ft 2 in (1.88 m)	RS Jr	The Potter's House	Jacksonville, FL
G	15	Marissa Riley	5 ft 10 in (1.78 m)	Sr	Lake Norman	Mooresville, NC
G	20	Anne Corrigan	5 ft 11 in (1.8 m)	Sr	Holton-Arms School	Vienna, VA
G	22	N'Dea Bryant	6 ft 0 in (1.83 m)	Sr	Goose Creek	Goose Creek, SC
G	24	Destinee Walker	5 ft 10 in (1.78 m)	Fr	Lake Highland Prep	Ocoee, FL
F	30	Hillary Summers	6 ft 2 in (1.88 m)	RS Jr	Village Christian Academy	Fayetteville, NC
F	31	Erika Johnson	6 ft 1 in (1.85 m)	RS Sr	Holy Names Academy; California	Seattle, WA
F	32	Xylina McDaniel	6 ft 2 in (1.88 m)	Sr	Spring Valley	Columbia, SC
G	41	Paris Kea	5 ft 9 in (1.75 m)	So	Page	Greenboro, NC
G	44	Hadiya Bembry	5 ft 6 in (1.68 m)	Fr	Holmes	Edenton, NC

Head coach

- Sylvia Hatchell (Carson-Newman)

Assistant coach(es)

- Andrew Calder (Coker)
- Tracey Williams-Johnson (UNC Pembroke)
- Sylvia Crawley (North Carolina)

Legend

- (C) Team captain
- (S) Suspended
- (I) Ineligible
- (W) Walk-on
- Injured
- Current redshirt

Roster
Last update: 2015-10-15

== Schedule ==
Date time, TV	Rank^{#}	Opponent^{#}	Result	Record	Site (attendance) city, state
Exhibition
11/04/2015*; 6:00 pm	No. 21	Wingate	W 59–48		Carmichael Arena; Chapel Hill, NC
11/09/2015*; 6:00 pm	No. 21	Mount Olive	W 99–45		Carmichael Arena; Chapel Hill, NC
Non-conference regular season
11/13/2015*; 4:00 pm	No. 21	Gardner–Webb	L 65–66	0–1	Carmichael Arena (1,527); Chapel Hill, NC
11/15/2015*; 12:30 pm	No. 21	Oregon	L 77–79	0–2	Carmichael Arena (2,036); Chapel Hill, NC
11/17/2015*; 6:00 pm		Florida A&M	W 94–58	1–2	Carmichael Arena (1,423); Chapel Hill, NC
11/20/2015*; 6:00 pm		Fairleigh Dickinson; Hall of Fame Women’s Challenge	W 64–46	2–2	Carmichael Arena (1,676); Chapel Hill, NC
11/21/2015*; 3:00 pm		Iona; Hall of Fame Women’s Challenge	W 64–52	3–2	Carmichael Arena (1,793); Chapel Hill, NC
11/22/2015*; 3:00 pm		Yale; Hall of Fame Women’s Challenge	W 70–63	4–2	Carmichael Arena (2,135); Chapel Hill, NC
11/25/2015*; 6:00 pm		Pacific	L 63–66	4–3	Carmichael Arena (1,694); Chapel Hill, NC
11/29/2015*; 2:00 pm, ESPN3		vs. Gonzaga; Hall of Fame Women’s Challenge	W 67–62	5–3	Mohegan Sun Arena; Uncasville, CT
12/02/2015*; 6:00 pm, ESPN3		No. 15 Northwestern; ACC–Big Ten Women's Challenge	L 72–85	5–4	Carmichael Arena (1,664); Chapel Hill, NC
12/12/2015*; 2:00 pm		Appalachian State	W 68–59	6–4	Carmichael Arena (2,486); Chapel Hill, NC
12/14/2015*; 8:00 pm, FSOK		at Oklahoma State	L 67–77	6–5	Gallagher-Iba Arena (2,672); Stillwater, OK
12/16/2015*; 4:00 pm		USC Upstate	W 80–40	7–5	Carmichael Arena (1,487); Chapel Hill, NC
12/20/2015*; 3:00 pm, ASN		vs. Southern Miss; Carolinas Challenge	W 69–62	8–5	Myrtle Beach Convention Center; Myrtle Beach, SC
12/29/2015*; 2:00 pm		New Hampshire	W 65–60	9–5	Carmichael Arena (1,646); Chapel Hill, NC
12/31/2015*; 1:00 pm		Maine	W 59–58	10–5	Carmichael Arena (1,732); Chapel Hill, NC
ACC regular season
01/03/2016; 2:00 pm, ESPN3		Clemson	W 72–56	11–5 (1–0)	Carmichael Arena (2,163); Chapel Hill, NC
01/07/2016; 7:00 pm, ESPN3		Syracuse	W 77–73	12–5 (2–0)	Carmichael Arena (1,724); Chapel Hill, NC
01/10/2016; 1:00 pm, ESPN2		at No. 3 Notre Dame	L 54–88	12–6 (2–1)	Edmund P. Joyce Center (8,942); South Bend, IN
01/14/2016; 7:00 pm, ESPN3		at Georgia Tech	L 73–80	12–7 (2–2)	Hank McCamish Pavilion (917); Atlanta, GA
01/17/2016; 12:30 pm, RSN		No. 21 Miami (FL)	L 61–76	12–8 (2–3)	Carmichael Arena (2,761); Chapel Hill, NC
01/21/2016; 7:00 pm		at Wake Forest	L 63–75	12–9 (2–4)	LJVM Coliseum (635); Winston-Salem, NC
01/24/2016; 3:00 pm, RSN		at Duke	L 55–71	12–10 (2–5)	Cameron Indoor Stadium (7,622); Durham, NC
01/31/2016; 2:00 pm		at NC State; Carolina–State Game	L 49–78	12–11 (2–6)	Broughton HS (2,811); Raleigh, NC
02/04/2016; 7:00 pm, ESPN3		Louisville	L 60–78	12–12 (2–7)	Carmichael Arena (2,176); Chapel Hill, NC
02/07/2016; 1:00 pm		at Boston College	W 86–78	13–12 (3–7)	Conte Forum (1,112); Chestnut Hill, MA
02/11/2016; 7:00 pm, ESPN3		Virginia Tech	W 71–67	14–12 (4–7)	Carmichael Arena (1,752); Chapel Hill, NC
02/14/2016; 2:00 pm, ESPN2		at No. 10 Florida State	L 63–94	14–13 (4–8)	Donald L. Tucker Civic Center (3,534); Tallahassee, FL
02/18/2016; 7:00 pm, ESPN3		Pittsburgh	L 60–76	14–14 (4–9)	Carmichael Arena (1,727); Chapel Hill, NC
02/21/2016; 1:00 pm, ESPN2		NC State; Carolina–State Game	L 66–80	14–15 (4–10)	Carmichael Arena (3,872); Chapel Hill, NC
02/25/2016; 7:00 pm, RSN		at Virginia	L 68–72	14–16 (4–11)	John Paul Jones Arena (3,109); Charlottesville, VA
02/28/2016; 3:00 pm, ESPN3		Duke	L 57–93	14–17 (4–12)	Carmichael Arena (4,762); Chapel Hill, NC
ACC Women's Tournament
03/02/2016; 1:00 pm, RSN		vs. Pittsburgh; First Round	L 72–82 ^{OT}	14–18	Greensboro Coliseum; Greensboro, NC
*Non-conference game. ^{#}Rankings from AP Poll. (#) Tournament seedings in parentheses. All times are in Eastern.

== Rankings ==
Regular season polls
Poll	Pre- season	Week 2	Week 3	Week 4	Week 5	Week 6	Week 7	Week 8	Week 9	Week 10	Week 11	Week 12	Week 13	Week 14	Week 15	Week 16	Week 17	Week 18	Week 19	Final
AP	21	RV	NR	NR	NR	NR	NR	NR	NR	NR	NR	NR	NR	NR	NR	NR	NR	NR	NR	N/A
Coaches	20	RV	NR	NR	NR	NR	NR	NR	NR	RV	RV	NR	NR	NR	NR	NR	NR	NR	NR	NR

Legend
	Increase in ranking
	Decrease in ranking
	Not ranked previous week
(RV)	Received votes

== See also ==
- 2015–16 North Carolina Tar Heels men's basketball team
