= Jervey Athletic Center =

Building in South Carolina, USA

Coordinates: 34.679372°N 82.84816°W

- Jervey Gym
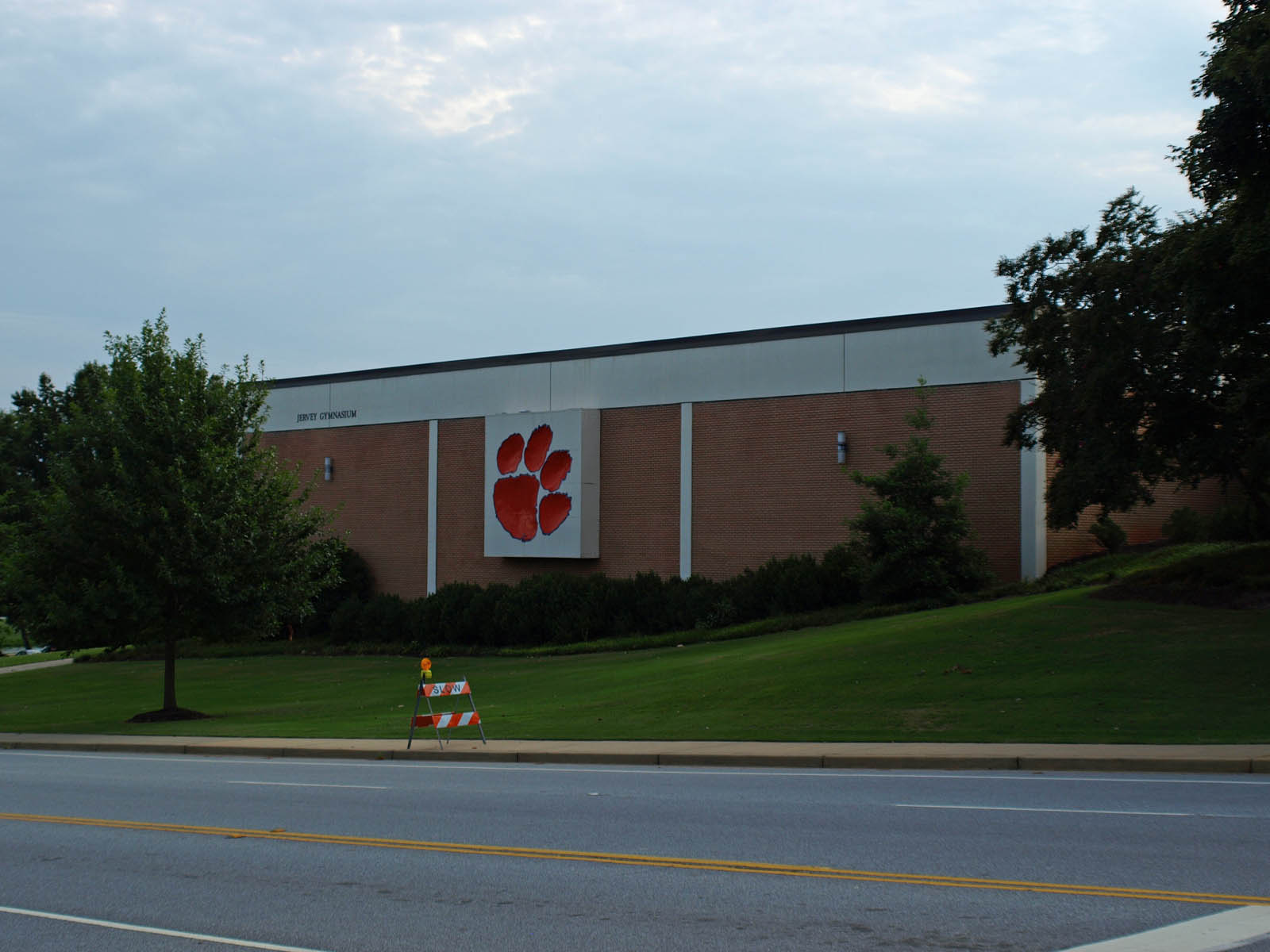
- Interactive map of Jervey Athletic Center
- Location: Centennial Blvd, Clemson, South Carolina
- Owner: Clemson University
- Operator: Clemson University
- Capacity: 2,000

Construction
- Opened: 1973
- Renovated: 1995
- Architects: Geiger, McElveen, & Kennedy

Tenants
- Clemson Tigers women's basketball (2015–2016); Clemson Tigers volleyball

The Jervey Athletic Center is a building in Clemson, South Carolina, on the campus of Clemson University. It contains the gymnasium for the volleyball team and offices and training facilities for all of Clemson's athletic teams. The facility was built in 1973 and renovated in 1995.
