= 2015–16 Old Dominion Monarchs women's basketball team =

Intercollegiate basketball season

2015–16 Old Dominion Monarchs women's basketball
- Conference: Conference USA
- Record: 17–17 (10–8 C-USA)
- Head coach: Karen Barefoot (5th season)
- Assistant coaches: Trina Patterson; Jermaine Woods; Jim Corrigan
- Home arena: Ted Constant Convocation Center

2015–16 Conference USA women's basketball standings
	Conf.				Overall
Team	W		L	PCT	W		L	PCT
UTEP	16	–	2	.889	29	–	5	.853
WKU	15	–	3	.833	27	–	7	.794
Middle Tennessee †	15	–	3	.833	24	–	9	.727
Charlotte	12	–	6	.667	19	–	12	.613
Old Dominion	10	–	8	.556	17	–	17	.500
Marshall	9	–	9	.500	21	–	12	.636
Louisiana Tech	9	–	9	.500	14	–	16	.467
UAB	7	–	11	.389	15	–	16	.484
Southern Miss	7	–	11	.389	14	–	16	.467
Rice	7	–	11	.389	9	–	22	.290
Florida Atlantic	6	–	12	.333	14	–	16	.467
UTSA	6	–	12	.333	10	–	19	.345
North Texas	5	–	13	.278	11	–	19	.367
FIU	2	–	16	.111	5	–	26	.161
† 2016 C-USA Tournament winner As of March 28, 2016; Rankings from AP poll

The 2015–16 Old Dominion Monarchs women’s basketball team represented Old Dominion University during the 2015–16 NCAA Division I women's basketball season. The Monarchs, led by fifth year head coach Karen Barefoot, played their home games at Ted Constant Convocation Center and were members of Conference USA.

They finished the season 17–17, 10–8 in C-USA play to finish in fifth place. They advanced to the championship game of the C-USA women's tournament where they lost to Middle Tennessee.

After defeating Howard 83–64, Old Dominion became the fourth D-I program to reach 1,000 overall wins.

== Roster ==
2015–16 Old Dominion Monarchs women's basketball team
Players
Coaches

Pos.	#	Name	Height	Year	Previous school	Hometown
G	0	Rhaven Kemp	5 ft 6 in (1.68 m)	Jr	Liberty Technology Magnet; Eastern Florida State	Jackson, Tennessee
G	2	MaKayla Timmons	5 ft 7 in (1.7 m)	Fr	Columbia Central	Columbia, Tennessee
G	3	Carolina Bernardeco	5 ft 6 in (1.68 m)	Fr	Escola Secundária de Santo André	Lisbon, Portugal
G	4	Jesse Booker	5 ft 6 in (1.68 m)	Fr	West Point	Middlesex, Virginia
G	5	Gianna Smith	5 ft 10 in (1.78 m)	Fr	Lake Taylor	Norfolk, Virginia
F	11	Aneesah Daniels	6 ft 0 in (1.83 m)	RS Sr	Clemson	Decatur, Georgia
F	14	Annika Holopainen	6 ft 1 in (1.85 m)	RS Jr	Makelanrinteen Lukio	Helsinki, Finland
G	20	Keyana Brown	5 ft 11 in (1.8 m)	So	Lafayette	Williamsburg, Virginia
C	23	Ije Ajemba	6 ft 3 in (1.91 m)	Jr	Parkdale	Lanham, Maryland
G	24	LaQuanda Younger	5 ft 10 in (1.78 m)	Sr	Warwick	Newport News, Virginia
F	25	Jennie Simms	6 ft 0 in (1.83 m)	RS Jr	Riverdale Baptist	Accokeek, Maryland
G	30	Ashley Jackson	5 ft 9 in (1.75 m)	Fr	Ridgeway	Memphis, Tennessee
F	34	Odegua Oigbokie	6 ft 1 in (1.85 m)	Jr	Ridgeway	Memphis, Tennessee
F	40	Destinee Young	6 ft 1 in (1.85 m)	Jr	Hoffman Estates	Hoffman Estates, Illinois

Head coach

- Karen Barefoot (Christopher Newport)

Assistant coach(es)

- Trina Patterson (Virginia)
- Jermaine Woods (Christopher Newport)
- Jim Corrigan (Duke)

Legend

- (C) Team captain
- (S) Suspended
- (I) Ineligible
- (W) Walk-on
- Injured
- Current redshirt

Roster

== Schedule ==
Date time, TV	Rank^{#}	Opponent^{#}	Result	Record	High points	High rebounds	High assists	Site (attendance) city, state
Exhibition
November 04, 2015*; 7:00 pm		Davis & Elkins	W 86–47	–	43 – Simms	8 – 2 tied	3 – 2 tied	Ted Constant Convocation Center (1,865); Norfolk, Virginia
Non-conference regular season
November 13, 2015*; 3:00 pm		at Richmond	L 57–62	0–1	15 – Brown (1)	8 – Ajemba (1)	2 – 2 tied	Robins Center (973); Richmond, Virginia
November 15, 2015*; 2:00 pm		Wagner	W 71–57	1–1	27 – Simms (1)	8 – 2 tied	6 – Simms (2)	Ted Constant Convocation Center (1,993); Norfolk, Virginia
November 17, 2015*; 7:00 pm		Miami (FL)	L 35–61	1–2	16 – Simms (2)	9 – Simms (2)	3 – Kemp (1)	Ted Constant Convocation Center (2,576); Norfolk, Virginia
November 23, 2015*; 7:00 pm		East Tennessee State	L 52–56	1–3	15 – Simms (3)	9 – Ajemba (2)	5 – Timmons (2)	Ted Constant Convocation Center (1,744); Norfolk, Virginia
November 26, 2015*; 5:45 pm		vs. No. 6 Maryland; Paradise Jam tournament Reef Division	L 49–95	1–4	23 – Simms (4)	7 – 2 tied	3 – Simms (3)	Sports and Fitness Center (1,024); Saint Thomas, USVI
November 27, 2015*; 10:00 pm		vs. Pittsburgh; Paradise Jam Tournament Reef Division	L 58–67	1–5	17 – Simms (5)	8 – Simms (3)	9 – Simms (4)	Sports and Fitness Center (1,425); Saint Thomas, USVI
November 28, 2015*; 5:45 pm		vs. South Dakota State; Paradise Jam Tournament Reef Division	L 39–71	1–6	10 – 2 tied	7 – Young (3)	2 – 2 tied	Sports and Fitness Center (1,729); Saint Thomas, USVI
December 02, 2015*; 11:00 am		Loyola (MD)	W 64–41	2–6	28 – Young (2)	15 – Young (4)	6 – Bernardeco (1)	Ted Constant Convocation Center (8,472); Norfolk, Virginia
December 15, 2015*; 5:00 pm		at Howard	W 83–64	3–6	17 – 3 tied	11 – Young (5)	5 – Bernardeco (2)	Burr Gymnasium (105); Washington, D.C.
December 19, 2015*; 7:30 pm		at VCU	L 54–74	3–7	14 – Young (4)	5 – Brown (1)	6 – Bernardeco (3)	Siegel Center (1,242); Richmond, Virginia
December 22, 2015*; 2:00 pm		at Maryland Eastern Shore	W 69–52	4–7	19 – Simms (6)	9 – Young (6)	5 – Bernardeco (4)	Hytche Athletic Center (345); Princess Anne, Maryland
December 29, 2015*; 5:00 pm		at William & Mary; Rivalry	L 64–75	4–8	35 – Simms (7)	9 – Simms (4)	2 – 5 tied	Kaplan Arena (627); Williamsburg, Virginia
C-USA regular season
January 03, 2016; 1:00 pm, FSN		at Charlotte	W 71–59	5–8 (1–0)	18 – Simms (8)	11 – Young (7)	3 – Bernardeco (5)	Dale F. Halton Arena (682); Charlotte, North Carolina
January 07, 2016; 7:00 pm, FSN		Louisiana Tech	L 51–69	5–9 (1–1)	24 – Simms (9)	8 – 2 tied	3 – Timmons (4)	Ted Constant Convocation Center (1,718); Norfolk, Virginia
January 09, 2016; 4:00 pm		Southern Miss	W 53–45	6–9 (2–1)	22 – Simms (10)	13 – Ajemba (4)	5 – Simms (6)	Ted Constant Convocation Center (1,975); Norfolk, Virginia
January 14, 2016; 8:00 pm		at UAB	L 55–58	6–10 (2–2)	21 – Simms (11)	8 – 2 tied	4 – Bernardeco (6)	Bartow Arena (226); Birmingham, Alabama
January 16, 2016; 7:00 pm		at Middle Tennessee	W 61–58	7–10 (3–2)	17 – Simms (12)	12 – Ajemba (5)	4 – 2 tied	Murphy Center (3,758); Murfreesboro, Tennessee
January 21, 2016; 12:00 pm		at WKU	L 51–68	7–11 (3–3)	18 – Simms (13)	8 – Ajemba (6)	5 – Simms (8)	E. A. Diddle Arena (2,814); Bowling Green, Kentucky
January 24, 2016; 1:00 pm		at Marshall	L 62–80	7–12 (3–4)	20 – Simms (14)	10 – Young (10)	6 – Timmons (5)	Cam Henderson Center (652); Huntington, West Virginia
January 28, 2016; 7:00 pm		Florida Atlantic	W 85–45	8–12 (4–4)	20 – Simms (15)	13 – Ajemba (7)	8 – Simms (9)	Ted Constant Convocation Center (1,718); Norfolk, Virginia
January 30, 2016; 4:00 pm		FIU	W 84–49	9–12 (5–4)	23 – Simms (16)	12 – Young (11)	8 – Simms (10)	Ted Constant Convocation Center (2,221); Norfolk, Virginia
February 06, 2016; 4:00 pm		Charlotte; Hoops for the Cure Game	W 94–85	10–12 (6–4)	35 – Simms (17)	13 – Ajemba (8)	5 – 2 tied	Ted Constant Convocation Center (3,146); Norfolk, Virginia
February 11, 2016; 8:00 pm		at North Texas	W 65–48	11–12 (7–4)	15 – Smith (2)	9 – Simms (7)	8 – Simms (12)	The Super Pit (484); Denton, Texas
February 13, 2016; 3:00 pm		at Rice	L 46–68	11–13 (7–5)	16 – Ajemba (1)	9 – Ajemba (9)	4 – Simms (13)	Tudor Fieldhouse (656); Houston, Texas
February 18, 2016; 7:00 pm		WKU	L 74–85 ^{OT}	11–14 (7–6)	28 – Simms (18)	9 – Ajemba (10)	4 – Simms (14)	Ted Constant Convocation Center (1,606); Norfolk, Virginia
February 20, 2016; 4:00 pm		Marshall	W 77–55	12–14 (8–6)	22 – Simms (19)	12 – Simms (8)	6 – Simms (15)	Ted Constant Convocation Center (2,487); Norfolk, Virginia
February 25, 2016; 9:05 pm		at UTEP	L 64–70	12–15 (8–7)	17 – Young (5)	17 – Young (12)	3 – Smith (2)	Don Haskins Center (2,055); El Paso, Texas
February 27, 2016; 3:00 pm		at UTSA	L 67–70	12–16 (8–8)	39 – Simms (20)	10 – Ajmeba (10)	4 – Bernardeco (9)	Convocation Center (803); San Antonio, Texas
March 03, 2016; 7:00 pm		North Texas	W 62–55	13–16 (9–8)	33 – Simms (21)	8 – 2 tied	4 – Bernardeco (10)	Ted Constant Convocation Center (1,663); Norfolk, Virginia
March 05, 2016; 1:00 pm		Rice	W 61–52	14–16 (10–8)	24 – Simms (22)	15 – Ajemba (12)	2 – 2 tied	Ted Constant Convocation Center (2,066); Norfolk, Virginia
C-USA Tournament
March 09, 2016; 2:30 pm, ASN	(5)	vs. (13) North Texas; Second Round	W 62–55	15–16	32 – Simms (23)	8 – Young (14)	2 – Simms (16)	Bartow Arena (311); Birmingham, Alabama
March 10, 2016; 2:30 pm, ASN	(5)	vs. (4) Charlotte; Quarterfinals	W 57–54	16–16	24 – Simms (24)	21 – Ajemba (13)	6 – Simms (17)	Bartow Arena (432); Birmingham, Alabama
March 11, 2016; 11:00 am, CBSSN	(5)	vs. (1) UTEP; Semifinals	W 66–54	17–16	21 – Simms (25)	12 – Young (15)	7 – Simms (18)	Legacy Arena; Birmingham, Alabama
March 12, 2016; 8:00 pm, CBSSN	(5)	vs. (2) Middle Tennessee; Championship Game	L 54–70	17–17	21 – Simms (26)	11 – Ajemba (14)	3 – Holopainen (1)	Legacy Arena; Birmingham, Alabama
*Non-conference game. ^{#}Rankings from AP Poll. (#) Tournament seedings in parentheses. All times are in Eastern Time.

- Source: Old Dominion Athletics

== See also ==
2015–16 Old Dominion Monarchs men's basketball team
