= 2015–16 Louisiana Tech Lady Techsters basketball team =

Intercollegiate basketball season

2015–16 Louisiana Tech Lady Techsters basketball
- Conference: Conference USA
- Record: 14–16 (9–9 C-USA)
- Head coach: Tyler Summitt (2nd season)
- Assistant coaches: Mickie DeMoss; Bernitha Johnson; Amber Smith
- Home arena: Thomas Assembly Center

2015–16 Conference USA women's basketball standings
	Conf.				Overall
Team	W		L	PCT	W		L	PCT
UTEP	16	–	2	.889	29	–	5	.853
WKU	15	–	3	.833	27	–	7	.794
Middle Tennessee †	15	–	3	.833	24	–	9	.727
Charlotte	12	–	6	.667	19	–	12	.613
Old Dominion	10	–	8	.556	17	–	17	.500
Marshall	9	–	9	.500	21	–	12	.636
Louisiana Tech	9	–	9	.500	14	–	16	.467
UAB	7	–	11	.389	15	–	16	.484
Southern Miss	7	–	11	.389	14	–	16	.467
Rice	7	–	11	.389	9	–	22	.290
Florida Atlantic	6	–	12	.333	14	–	16	.467
UTSA	6	–	12	.333	10	–	19	.345
North Texas	5	–	13	.278	11	–	19	.367
FIU	2	–	16	.111	5	–	26	.161
† 2016 C-USA Tournament winner As of March 28, 2016; Rankings from AP poll

The 2015–16 Louisiana Tech Lady Techsters basketball team represented Louisiana Tech University during the 2015–16 NCAA Division I women's basketball season. The Lady Techsters, led by head coach Tyler Summitt, played their home games at Thomas Assembly Center and were members of Conference USA. They finished the season 14–16, 9–9 in C-USA play to finish in a tie for seventh place. They lost in the first round of the C-USA women's tournament to Rice.

On April 7, 2016, Summitt resigned from Louisiana Tech for personal reasons citing "engaging in a relationship that has negatively affected the people I love, respect and care about the most." He finished at Louisiana Tech with a 2 year record of 30–31.

== Roster ==
2015–16 Louisiana Tech Lady Techsters women's basketball team
Players
Coaches

Pos.	#	Name	Height	Year	Previous school	Hometown
F	1	Dawn Gipson	6 ft 1 in (1.85 m)	Fr	Ribault HS	Jacksonville, FL
G	2	Rochelle Vasquez	5 ft 10 in (1.78 m)	Jr	Gulf Coast State College	Dallas, TX
G	3	Ruby Richie	5 ft 6 in (1.68 m)	RS Jr	Ouachita Baptist	Ruston, LA
G	4	Kierra Anthony	5 ft 6 in (1.68 m)	Fr	New Iberia HS	New Iberia, LA
G	10	Maren Kreid	5 ft 7 in (1.7 m)	RS Fr	Brentwood Academy	Franklin, TN
G	12	Brooklyn Pumroy	5 ft 9 in (1.75 m)	RS Jr	Marquette	Fairborn, OH
G	22	Jasmine LeBlanc	5 ft 10 in (1.78 m)	Fr	Breaux Bridge HS	Breaux Bridge, LA
F	23	Reauna Cleaver	6 ft 2 in (1.88 m)	Fr	Elizabethtown HS	Elizabethtown, KY
G	24	Tiara Davenport	6 ft 0 in (1.83 m)	So	Duncanville HS	Dallas, TX
G/F	25	Brandi Wingate	6 ft 2 in (1.88 m)	Sr	Northwest Florida State	Columbia, MD
G	30	Ashley Santos	5 ft 11 in (1.8 m)	RS Jr	Marquette	Geneva, IL
F	32	Kevione Moten	6 ft 4 in (1.93 m)	Jr	Ouachita HS	Monroe, LA
F	34	Alexus Malone (I) (redshirt)	6 ft 0 in (1.83 m)	Jr	Buffalo	Oxford, MS

Head coach

Tyler Summitt (Tennessee)

Assistant coach(es)

Mickie DeMoss (Louisiana Tech)
Bernitha Johnson (Tennessee)
Amber Smith (Kentucky)

Legend

- (C) Team captain
- (S) Suspended
- (I) Ineligible
- (W) Walk-on
- Injured
- Current redshirt

Roster

== Schedule ==
Date time, TV	Rank^{#}	Opponent^{#}	Result	Record	Site (attendance) city, state
Exhibition
11/06/2015*; 6:30 pm		Mississippi College	W 112–52		Thomas Assembly Center; Ruston, LA
Non-conference regular season
11/14/2015*; 2:00 pm		at Wisconsin	L 65–79	0–1	Kohl Center (3,517); Madison, WI
11/18/2015*; 6:30 pm		Loyola (New Orleans)	W 76–40	1–1	Thomas Assembly Center (1,821); Ruston, LA
11/21/2015*; 6:30 pm		Stephen F. Austin	W 76–44	2–1	Thomas Assembly Center (1,812); Ruston, LA
11/27/2015*; 12:00 pm		vs. UCLA; Junkanoo Jam semifinals	L 57–68	2–2	St. George HS Gymnasium (763); Freeport, BAH
11/28/2015*; 12:00 pm		vs. Denver; Junkanoo Jam 3rd place game	W 58–53	3–2	St. George HS Gymnasium (348); Freeport, BAH
12/02/2015*; 6:30 pm		Prairie View A&M	L 68–77	3–3	Thomas Assembly Center (1,502); Ruston, LA
12/05/2015*; 1:00 pm		at Nicholls State	W 58–55	4–3	Stopher Gym; Thibodaux, LA
12/10/2015*; 8:00 pm		at Arizona	L 67–77	4–4	McKale Center (827); Tucson, AZ
12/13/2015*; 3:00 pm		No. 9 Mississippi State	L 63–93	4–5	Thomas Assembly Center (3,513); Ruston, LA
12/19/2015*; 6:00 pm		Louisiana–Lafayette	W 79–62	5–5	Thomas Assembly Center (1,818); Ruston, LA
12/22/2015*; 6:00 pm		McNeese State	L 71–74	5–6	Thomas Assembly Center (1,849); Ruston, LA
Conference USA regular season
01/02/2016; 4:00 pm		at Southern Miss	L 59–69	5–7 (0–1)	Reed Green Coliseum (1,525); Hattiesburg, MS
01/07/2016; 6:00 pm		at Old Dominion	W 69–51	6–7 (1–1)	Ted Constant Convocation Center (1,718); Norfolk, VA
01/09/2016; 6:00 pm		at Charlotte	L 58–63	6–8 (1–2)	Dale F. Halton Arena (821); Charlotte, NC
01/14/2016; 6:30 pm		FIU	W 82–63	7–8 (2–2)	Thomas Assembly Center (2,014); Ruston, LA
01/16/2016; 6:00 pm		Florida Atlantic	W 65–62	8–8 (3–2)	Thomas Assembly Center (2,116); Ruston, LA
01/24/2016; 12:00 pm, ASN		Southern Miss	W 72–37	9–8 (4–2)	Thomas Assembly Center (1,724); Ruston, LA
01/28/2016; 7:00 pm		at UTSA	W 82–72 ^{OT}	10–8 (5–2)	Convocation Center (539); San Antonio, TX
01/30/2016; 3:00 pm		at UTEP	L 80–86	10–9 (5–3)	Don Haskins Center (3,157); El Paso, TX
02/04/2016; 6:30 pm		Rice	W 65–63	11–9 (6–3)	Thomas Assembly Center (1,925); Ruston, LA
02/06/2016; 6:00 pm		North Texas	W 77–71	12–9 (7–3)	Thomas Assembly Center (1,769); Ruston, LA
02/11/2016; 6:30 pm		at Middle Tennessee	L 57–68	12–10 (7–4)	Murphy Center (3,316); Murfreesboro, TN
02/13/2016; 2:00 pm		at UAB	L 49–64	12–11 (7–5)	Bartow Arena (688); Birmingham, AL
02/18/2016; 6:30 pm		UTSA	W 75–66	13–11 (8–5)	Thomas Assembly Center (1,835); Ruston, LA
02/20/2016; 6:00 pm		UTEP	L 65–72	13–12 (8–6)	Thomas Assembly Center (1,974); Ruston, LA
02/25/2016; 7:00 pm		at North Texas	W 78–67	14–12 (9–6)	The Super Pit (670); Denton, TX
02/27/2016; 2:00 pm		at Rice	L 77–84	14–13 (9–7)	Tudor Fieldhouse (739); Houston, TX
03/03/2016; 6:30 pm		Marshall	L 52–54	14–14 (9–8)	Thomas Assembly Center (1,803); Ruston, LA
03/05/2016; 7:00 pm		WKU	L 58–69	14–15 (9–9)	Thomas Assembly Center (1,905); Ruston, LA
Conference USA Women's Tournament
03/09/2016; 5:00 pm, ASN		vs. Rice; Second Round	L 57–62 ^{OT}	14–16	Bartow Arena; Birmingham, AL
*Non-conference game. ^{#}Rankings from AP Poll. (#) Tournament seedings in parentheses. All times are in Central Time.

== See also ==
2015–16 Louisiana Tech Bulldogs basketball team
