= 2015–16 Western Kentucky Lady Toppers basketball team =

Intercollegiate basketball season

2015–16 Western Kentucky Lady Toppers basketball

Great Alaska Shootout Champions

WNIT, Quarterfinals
- Conference: Conference USA
- Record: 27–7 (15–3 C-USA)
- Head coach: Michelle Clark-Heard (3rd season)
- Assistant coaches: Greg Collins; Melissa Kolbe; Katherine Graham
- Home arena: E. A. Diddle Arena

2015–16 Conference USA women's basketball standings
	Conf.				Overall
Team	W		L	PCT	W		L	PCT
UTEP	16	–	2	.889	29	–	5	.853
WKU	15	–	3	.833	27	–	7	.794
Middle Tennessee †	15	–	3	.833	24	–	9	.727
Charlotte	12	–	6	.667	19	–	12	.613
Old Dominion	10	–	8	.556	17	–	17	.500
Marshall	9	–	9	.500	21	–	12	.636
Louisiana Tech	9	–	9	.500	14	–	16	.467
UAB	7	–	11	.389	15	–	16	.484
Southern Miss	7	–	11	.389	14	–	16	.467
Rice	7	–	11	.389	9	–	22	.290
Florida Atlantic	6	–	12	.333	14	–	16	.467
UTSA	6	–	12	.333	10	–	19	.345
North Texas	5	–	13	.278	11	–	19	.367
FIU	2	–	16	.111	5	–	26	.161
† 2016 C-USA Tournament winner As of March 28, 2016; Rankings from AP poll

The 2015–16 WKU Lady Toppers basketball team represented Western Kentucky University during the 2015–16 NCAA Division I women's basketball season. The Lady Toppers, led by third year head coach Michelle Clark-Heard, played their home games at E. A. Diddle Arena and were second year members of Conference USA. They finished the season 27–7, 15–3 in C-USA play to finish in a tie for second place. They lost in the quarterfinals of the C-USA women's tournament to Marshall. They were invited to the Women's National Invitation Tournament, where they defeated Dayton and Tennessee–Martin, Saint Louis in the first, second and third rounds before falling to South Dakota in the quarterfinals.

== Roster ==
2015–16 WKU Lady Toppers women's basketball team
Players
Coaches

Pos.	#	Name	Height	Year	Previous school	Hometown
F	00	Simone Goods	6 ft 2 in (1.88 m)	Fr	Benson HS	Omaha, NE
F	1	Kayla Styles	6 ft 1 in (1.85 m)	Jr	duPont Manual HS; Spalding	Louisville, KY
F	2	Taylor Brown	6 ft 0 in (1.83 m)	Fr	Eastside HS	Paterson, NJ
G	3	Sidnee Bopp	5 ft 6 in (1.68 m)	Fr	Marmaduke HS	Marmaduke, AR
G	5	Micah Jones	5 ft 8 in (1.73 m)	Sr	Green County HS	Greensburg, KY
F	10	Tashia Brown	6 ft 1 in (1.85 m)	So	Lowndes HS	Lake Park, GA
G	12	Kendall Noble	5 ft 11 in (1.8 m)	RS Jr	Perry County Central HS	Hazard, KY
G	20	Ima Akpan	5 ft 10 in (1.78 m)	RS Jr	Hamilton Christian Academy; Kilgore College	Calabar, Nigeria
F	23	Ivy Brown	6 ft 1 in (1.85 m)	So	LaRue County HS	Hodgenville. KY
G	24	Jaycee Coe	5 ft 11 in (1.8 m)	So	Jackson County HS; Kentucky	Gainesboro, TN
G/F	32	Kayla Smith	5 ft 11 in (1.8 m)	Fr	Fayette County HS	Fayetteville, GA
F	33	Jalynn McClain	6 ft 0 in (1.83 m)	Sr	Jefferson HS	Jeffersonville, IN

Head coach

- Michelle Clark-Heard (Western Kentucky)

Assistant coach(es)

- Greg Collins (Louisville)
- Melissa Kolbe (Wittenberg)
- Katherine Graham (LSU)

Legend

- (C) Team captain
- (S) Suspended
- (I) Ineligible
- (W) Walk-on
- Injured
- Current redshirt

Roster

== Schedule ==
Date time, TV	Rank^{#}	Opponent^{#}	Result	Record	Site (attendance) city, state
Exhibition
11/03/2015*; 7:00 pm		Ouachita Baptist	W 108–43	–	E. A. Diddle Arena (829); Bowling Green, KY
Non-conference regular season
11/19/2015*; 6:00 pm, ESPN3		at Ball State	L 60–74	0–1	John E. Worthen Arena (987); Muncie, IN
11/21/2015*; 2:30 pm, FCS/WKYU		No. 16 Louisville	W 71–69	1–1	E. A. Diddle Arena (3,176); Bowling Green, KY
11/24/2015*; 9:00 pm		vs. George Mason; Great Alaska Shootout semifinals	W 84–58	2–1	Alaska Airlines Center (2,299); Anchorage, AK
11/25/2015*; 9:00 pm		at Alaska Anchorage; Great Alaska Shootout championship	W 62–58	3–1	Alaska Airlines Center (2,510); Anchorage, AK
12/02/2015*; 6:00 pm		at Ole Miss	L 53–59	3–2	Tad Smith Coliseum (906); Oxford, MS
12/05/2015*; 2:00 pm, FCS/WKYU		Austin Peay	W 88–69	4–2	E. A. Diddle Arena (609); Bowling Green, KY
12/13/2015*; 2:00 pm		at Texas–Arlington	W 73–64	5–2	College Park Center (1,024); Arlington, TX
12/16/2015*; 5:30 pm		Eastern Kentucky; BB&T Classic	W 76–60	6–2	E. A. Diddle Arena (2,217); Bowling Green, KY
12/18/2015*; 5:30 pm		at College of Charleston	W 78–44	7–2	TD Arena (125); Charleston, SC
12/21/2015*; 6:30 pm, ESPN3		at Lipscomb	W 64–56	8–2	Allen Arena (215); Nashville, TN
12/29/2015*; 7:00 pm, FCS/WKYU		Belmont	W 80–65	9–2	E. A. Diddle Arena (1,477); Bowling Green, KY
Conference USA regular season
01/02/2016; 2:00 pm		Marshall	W 81–52	10–2 (1–0)	E. A. Diddle Arena (1,413); Bowling Green, KY
01/07/2016; 7:00 pm		at FIU	W 71–69	11–2 (2–0)	FIU Arena (356); Miami, FL
01/09/2016; 2:00 pm		at Florida Atlantic	W 81–62	12–2 (3–0)	FAU Arena (469); Boca Raton, FL
01/14/2016; 7:00 pm		Rice	W 52–49	13–2 (4–0)	E. A. Diddle Arena (937); Bowling Green, KY
01/16/2016; 2:00 pm		North Texas	W 65–53	14–2 (5–0)	E. A. Diddle Arena (1,191); Bowling Green, KY
01/21/2016; 11:00 am, FCS/WKYU		Old Dominion	W 68–51	15–2 (6–0)	E. A. Diddle Arena (2,814); Bowling Green, KY
01/23/2016; 2:00 pm		Charlotte	W 77–66	16–2 (7–0)	E. A. Diddle Arena (817); Bowling Green, KY
01/28/2016; 7:00 pm		at UAB	W 63–49	17–2 (8–0)	Bartow Arena (521); Birmingham, AL
01/30/2016; 5:00 pm, FSN		at Middle Tennessee	L 75–83	17–3 (8–1)	Murphy Center (5,125); Murfreesboro, TN
02/04/2016; 7:00 pm		UTSA	W 72–65	18–3 (9–1)	E. A. Diddle Arena (1,076); Bowling Green, KY
02/06/2016; 2:00 pm, FCS/WKYU		UTEP	L 78–85	18–4 (9–2)	E. A. Diddle Arena (2,107); Bowling Green, KY
02/14/2016; 12:00 pm, ASN		at Marshall	W 80–76	19–4 (10–2)	Cam Henderson Center (472); Huntington, WV
02/18/2016; 6:00 pm		at Old Dominion	W 85–74 ^{OT}	20–4 (11–2)	Ted Constant Convocation Center (1,606); Norfolk, VA
02/20/2016; 6:00 pm		at Charlotte	L 72–81	20–5 (11–3)	Dale F. Halton Arena (1,423); Charlotte, NC
02/25/2016; 8:00 pm, FSN		Middle Tennessee	W 62–51	21–5 (12–3)	E. A. Diddle Arena (1,423); Bowling Green, KY
02/27/2016; 2:00 pm, FCS/WKYU		UAB	W 64–55	22–5 (13–3)	E. A. Diddle Arena (1,851); Bowling Green, KY
03/03/2016; 6:00 pm		at Southern Miss	W 54–53	23–5 (14–3)	Reed Green Coliseum (1,382); Hattiesburg, MS
03/05/2016; 7:00 pm		at Louisiana Tech	W 69–58	24–5 (15–3)	Thomas Assembly Center (1,905); Ruston, LA
Conference USA Women's Tournament
03/10/2016; 7:30 pm, ASN		vs. Marshall; Quarterfinals	L 63–66	24–6	Bartow Arena (499); Birmingham, AL
WNIT
03/17/2016*; 7:00 pm		Dayton; First Round	W 89–72	25–6	E. A. Diddle Arena (1,066); Bowling Green, KY
03/21/2016*; 7:00 pm		Tennessee–Martin; Second Round	W 64–57	26–6	E. A. Diddle Arena (1,372); Bowling Green, KY
03/25/2016*; 7:00 pm		at Saint Louis; Third Round	W 78–76 ^{OT}	27–6	Chaifetz Arena (1,754); St. Louis, MO
03/27/2016*; 7:00 pm		at South Dakota; Quarterfinals	L 54–68	27–7	DakotaDome (2,749); Vermillion, SD
*Non-conference game. ^{#}Rankings from AP Poll. (#) Tournament seedings in parentheses. All times are in Central Time.

== Rankings ==
Regular season polls
Poll	Pre- Season	Week 2	Week 3	Week 4	Week 5	Week 6	Week 7	Week 8	Week 9	Week 10	Week 11	Week 12	Week 13	Week 14	Week 15	Week 16	Week 17	Week 18	Week 19	Final
AP	RV	RV	RV	RV	NR	NR	NR	NR	NR	NR	NR	NR	NR	NR	NR	NR	NR	NR	NR	N/A
Coaches	NR	NR	RV	RV	NR	NR	NR	NR	NR	NR	RV	RV	RV	RV	RV	RV	RV	RV	RV	RV

Legend
	Increase in ranking
	Decrease in ranking
	Not ranked previous week
(RV)	Received Votes

== See also ==
2015–16 WKU Hilltoppers basketball team
