= 2015–16 FIU Panthers women's basketball team =

Intercollegiate basketball season

2015–16 FIU Panthers women's basketball
- Conference: Conference USA
- Record: 5–26 (2–16 C-USA)
- Head coach: Marlin Chinn (1st season)
- Assistant coaches: Tiara Malcom; Keunta Miles; Brianna Skeens
- Home arena: FIU Arena

2015–16 Conference USA women's basketball standings
	Conf.				Overall
Team	W		L	PCT	W		L	PCT
UTEP	16	–	2	.889	29	–	5	.853
WKU	15	–	3	.833	27	–	7	.794
Middle Tennessee †	15	–	3	.833	24	–	9	.727
Charlotte	12	–	6	.667	19	–	12	.613
Old Dominion	10	–	8	.556	17	–	17	.500
Marshall	9	–	9	.500	21	–	12	.636
Louisiana Tech	9	–	9	.500	14	–	16	.467
UAB	7	–	11	.389	15	–	16	.484
Southern Miss	7	–	11	.389	14	–	16	.467
Rice	7	–	11	.389	9	–	22	.290
Florida Atlantic	6	–	12	.333	14	–	16	.467
UTSA	6	–	12	.333	10	–	19	.345
North Texas	5	–	13	.278	11	–	19	.367
FIU	2	–	16	.111	5	–	26	.161
† 2016 C-USA Tournament winner As of March 28, 2016; Rankings from AP poll

The 2015–16 FIU Panthers women's basketball team represented Florida International University during the 2015–16 NCAA Division I women's basketball season. The Panthers, led by first year head coach Marlin Chinn, played their home games at FIU Arena, and were members of Conference USA. They finished the season 5–26, 5–16 in C-USA play to finish in last place. They advanced to the second round of the C-USA women's tournament, where they lost to Marshall.

== Controversy ==
On March 11, 2016, FIU fired Chinn for an NCAA improper benefits rules violation, specifically a $600 loan to team captain Destini Feagin to resolve a school debt. The university suspended Chinn two weeks earlier, after Feagin accused Chinn of sexual harassment that persisted throughout the season. FIU subsequently promoted assistant coach Tiara Malcom to head coach on April 8.

== Roster ==
2015–16 FIU Panthers women's basketball team
Players
Coaches

Pos.	#	Name	Height	Year	Previous school	Hometown
G	1	Kiandre'a Pound	6 ft 0 in (1.83 m)	RS So	Sebastian River HS	Vero Beach, FL
G	2	Jade Cheek	5 ft 8 in (1.73 m)	So	Dr. Phillips HS	Orlando, FL
G	3	Tianah Alvarado	5 ft 9 in (1.75 m)	Jr	Lakewood HS; Gulf Coast State College	St. Petersburg, FL
G	5	Taylor Shade	5 ft 6 in (1.68 m)	Sr	Boynton Beach Community HS	Boynton Beach, FL
G/F	10	Katrina Epnere	5 ft 10 in (1.78 m)	Sr	Riga State Gymnasium No.1	Riga, Latvia
G	13	Janka Hegedus	6 ft 1 in (1.85 m)	Jr	Eotvos Jozsef HS	Budapest, Hungary
G	15	Kristian Hudson	5 ft 5 in (1.65 m)	Fr	Clay-Chalkville HS	Birmingham, AL
G	20	Aajah Hawkins	5 ft 7 in (1.7 m)	So	Pickerington Central HS	Pickerington, OH
G	21	Destini Feagin	5 ft 10 in (1.78 m)	Sr	Nzareth Regional HS; Gulf Coast State College	Philadelphia, PA
G	23	Nikolina Todorovic	5 ft 7 in (1.7 m)	Jr	Gymnasium Banja Luka	Bosnia and Herzegovina
G	25	Amari Hawkins	5 ft 8 in (1.73 m)	So	Pickerington Central HS	Pickerington, OH
G	32	Soraya Page	5 ft 11 in (1.8 m)	Jr	Matthew Flinders Girls Secondary College; Diablo Valley College	Queensland, Australia
F	33	Brianna Wright	6 ft 2 in (1.88 m)	Sr	Titusville HS	Titusville, FL

Head coach

Marlin Chinn (Hampton)

Assistant coach(es)

Tiara Malcom (Delaware)
Keunta Miles (North Florida)
Brianna Skeens (Augustana (IL))

Legend

- (C) Team captain
- (S) Suspended
- (I) Ineligible
- (W) Walk-on
- Injured
- Current redshirt

Roster

== Schedule ==
Date time, TV	Rank^{#}	Opponent^{#}	Result	Record	Site (attendance) city, state
Non-conference regular season
11/13/2015*; 5:00 pm		Florida A&M	W 81–65	1–0	FIU Arena (531); Miami, FL
11/17/2015*; 7:00 pm		at UCF	L 72–89	1–1	CFE Arena (1,330); Orlando, FL
11/23/2015*; 7:00 pm		Florida Gulf Coast	L 53–81	1–2	FIU Arena (374); Miami, FL
11/27/2015*; 12:00 pm		Marquette; FIU Turkey Slam semifinals	L 83–95	1–3	FIU Arena (N/A); Miami, FL
11/29/2015*; 2:00 pm		Wichita State; FIU Turkey Slam 3rd place game	L 62–76	1–4	FIU Arena (316); Miami, FL
12/04/2015*; 5:00 pm		UMass Lowell	W 71–68	2–4	FIU Arena (315); Miami, FL
12/06/2015*; 12:00 pm, ESPN3		at Jacksonville	L 44–80	2–5	Swisher Gymnasium (217); Jacksonville, FL
12/15/2015*; 11:00 am		at Cleveland State	L 57–64	2–6	Wolstein Center (1,751); Cleveland, OH
12/22/2015*; 2:00 pm, ESPN3		at No. 23 Miami (FL)	L 55–83	2–7	BankUnited Center (650); Coral Gables, FL
12/28/2015*; 12:00 pm		Rhode Island; The Surfing Santa Classic semifinals	L 50–68	2–8	FIU Arena; Miami, FL
12/29/2015*; 2:00 pm		Wake Forest; The Surfing Santa Classic 3rd place game	L 53–57	2–9	FIU Arena (353); Miami, FL
Conference USA regular season
01/03/2016; 2:00 pm		at Florida Atlantic	L 82–87	2–10 (0–1)	FAU Arena (527); Boca Raton, FL
01/07/2016; 7:00 pm		WKU	L 69–71	2–11 (0–2)	FIU Arena (356); Miami, FL
01/09/2016; 2:00 pm		Marshall	L 58–65	2–12 (0–3)	FIU Arena (302); Miami, FL
01/14/2016; 7:30 pm		at Louisiana Tech	L 63–82	2–13 (0–4)	Thomas Assembly Center (2,014); Ruston, LA
01/16/2016; 5:00 pm		at Southern Miss	L 55–82	2–14 (0–5)	Reed Green Coliseum (1,660); Hattiesburg, MS
01/21/2016; 7:00 pm		UTSA	L 52–63	2–15 (0–6)	FIU Arena (376); Miami, FL
01/23/2016; 2:00 pm		UTEP	L 57–69	2–16 (0–7)	FIU Arena (316); Miami, FL
01/28/2016; 7:00 pm		at Charlotte	L 74–87	2–17 (0–8)	Dale F. Halton Arena (682); Charlotte, NC
01/30/2016; 4:00 pm		at Old Dominion	L 49–84	2–18 (0–9)	Ted Constant Convocation Center (2,221); Norfolk, VA
02/04/2016; 7:00 pm		UAB	W 72–61	3–18 (1–9)	FIU Arena (342); Miami, FL
02/06/2016; 2:00 pm		Middle Tennessee	L 62–85	3–19 (1–10)	FIU Arena (324); Miami, FL
02/11/2016; 9:05 pm		at UTEP	L 52–70	3–20 (1–11)	Don Haskins Center (2,517); El Paso, TX
02/13/2016; 2:00 pm		at UTSA	W 59–54	4–20 (2–11)	Convocation Center (401); San Antonio, TX
02/18/2016; 7:00 pm		North Texas	L 40–58	4–21 (2–12)	FIU Arena (334); Miami, FL
02/20/2016; 12:00 pm, FSN		Rice	L 62–68	4–22 (2–13)	FIU Arena (485); Miami, FL
02/27/2016; 7:00 pm		Florida Atlantic	L 52–63	4–23 (2–14)	FIU Arena (418); Miami, FL
03/03/2016; 8:00 pm		at UAB	L 42–71	4–24 (2–15)	Bartow Arena (446); Birmingham, AL
03/05/2016; 3:00 pm		at Middle Tennessee	L 55–77	4–25 (2–16)	Murphy Center (3,707); Murfreesboro, TN
Conference USA Women's Tournament
03/08/2016; 2:30 pm, ASN		vs. UTSA; First Round	W 61–56	5–25	Bartow Arena (272); Birmingham, AL
03/09/2016; 8:30 pm, ASN		vs. Marshall; Second Round	L 44–76	5–26	Bartow Arena; Birmingham, AL
*Non-conference game. ^{#}Rankings from AP Poll. (#) Tournament seedings in parentheses. All times are in Eastern Time.

== See also ==
2015–16 FIU Panthers men's basketball team
