= 2015–16 UTEP Miners women's basketball team =

Intercollegiate basketball season

2015–16 UTEP Miners women's basketball

UTEP Thanksgiving Classic Champions C-USA Regular Season Champions

WNIT, Quarterfinals
- Conference: Conference USA
- Record: 29–5 (16–2 C-USA)
- Head coach: Keitha Adams (15th season)
- Assistant coaches: Ewa Laskowska; Bill Damuth; Kelli Willingham Bagley
- Home arena: Don Haskins Center

2015–16 Conference USA women's basketball standings
	Conf.				Overall
Team	W		L	PCT	W		L	PCT
UTEP	16	–	2	.889	29	–	5	.853
WKU	15	–	3	.833	27	–	7	.794
Middle Tennessee †	15	–	3	.833	24	–	9	.727
Charlotte	12	–	6	.667	19	–	12	.613
Old Dominion	10	–	8	.556	17	–	17	.500
Marshall	9	–	9	.500	21	–	12	.636
Louisiana Tech	9	–	9	.500	14	–	16	.467
UAB	7	–	11	.389	15	–	16	.484
Southern Miss	7	–	11	.389	14	–	16	.467
Rice	7	–	11	.389	9	–	22	.290
Florida Atlantic	6	–	12	.333	14	–	16	.467
UTSA	6	–	12	.333	10	–	19	.345
North Texas	5	–	13	.278	11	–	19	.367
FIU	2	–	16	.111	5	–	26	.161
† 2016 C-USA Tournament winner As of March 28, 2016; Rankings from AP poll

The 2015–16 UTEP Miners women's basketball team represented the University of Texas at El Paso during the 2015–16 NCAA Division I women's basketball season.

The Lady Miners, led by fifteenth-year head coach Keitha Adams, played their home games at Don Haskins Center and were members of Conference USA. They finished the season 29–5, 16–2 in C-USA play to win the C-USA regular season title.

They advanced to the semifinals of the C-USA women's tournament, where they lost to Old Dominion. They received an automatic bid to the Women's National Invitation Tournament, where they defeated Abilene Christian, Arkansas State and TCU in the first, second and third rounds respectively, before falling to Oregon in the quarterfinals.

== Roster ==
2015–16 UTEP Miners women's basketball team
Players
Coaches

Pos.	#	Name	Height	Year	Previous school	Hometown
G	1	Starr Breedlove	5 ft 6 in (1.68 m)	RS Sr	Louisville	Teaneck, NJ
G	2	Camesha Turner	5 ft 9 in (1.75 m)	Sr	Lincoln	Dallas, TX
G	4	Lulu McKinney	5 ft 7 in (1.7 m)	So	A&M Consolidated	Houston, TX
G	5	Shaylan Coleman	5 ft 7 in (1.7 m)	Fr	Richardson	Richardson, TX
F	10	Wiktoria Zapart	6 ft 1 in (1.85 m)	Fr	III Liceum Ogolnokszalcace w Lodzi	Łódź, Poland
G	12	Sparkle Taylor	5 ft 10 in (1.78 m)	Jr	Northwestern HS	Flint, MI
G/F	14	Najala Howell	5 ft 10 in (1.78 m)	Fr	DeSoto HS	DeSoto, TX
F	15	Agata Dobrowolska	6 ft 3 in (1.91 m)	Jr	Casper College	Lublin, Poland
F	22	Jessica Barbosa	6 ft 1 in (1.85 m)	Fr	Windsor HS	Bissau, Guinea-Bissau
G	24	Jenzel Nash	5 ft 7 in (1.7 m)	RS Jr	Worthing HS	Houston, TX
G	25	Anete Kirsteine	5 ft 11 in (1.8 m)	Sr	Seward County CC	Riga, Latvia
F	33	Daeshi McCants	6 ft 1 in (1.85 m)	So	Mayfield HS	Las Cruces, NM
F	34	Lawna Kennedy	6 ft 0 in (1.83 m)	Sr	Atlanta Metropolitan State College	Fayetteville, GA
F	40	Rudiane Eduardo	6 ft 1 in (1.85 m)	Sr	Northwest Florida State College	Lyon, France
F	42	Tamara Seda	6 ft 4 in (1.93 m)	Jr	Seward County CC	Maputo, Mozambique

Head coach

- Keitha Adams (Southwestern)

Assistant coach(es)

- Ewa Laskowska (Pittsburg State)
- Bill Damuth (UT Tyler)
- Kelli Willingham Bagley (UTEP)

Legend

- (C) Team captain
- (S) Suspended
- (I) Ineligible
- (W) Walk-on
- Injured
- Current redshirt

Roster

== Schedule ==
Date time, TV	Rank^{#}	Opponent^{#}	Result	Record	Site (attendance) city, state
Exhibition
11/07/2015*; 4:35 pm		St. Mary's	W 66–50		Don Haskins Center; El Paso, TX
Non-conference regular season
11/15/2015*; 2:05 pm		Houston Baptist	W 98–63	1–0	Don Haskins Center (977); El Paso, TX
11/17/2015*; 7:05 pm		Northern Arizona	W 77–66	2–0	Don Haskins Center (711); El Paso, TX
11/22/2015*; 2:05 pm		Hampton	W 78–54	3–0	Don Haskins Center (724); El Paso, TX
11/27/2015*; 7:05 pm		UC Riverside; UTEP Thanksgiving Classic semifinals	W 68–57	4–0	Don Haskins Center (841); El Paso, TX
11/28/2015*; 7:05 pm		Idaho State; UTEP Thanksgiving Classic championship	W 67–54	5–0	Don Haskins Center (859); El Paso, TX
12/02/2015*; 4:15 pm		New Mexico	W 70–62	6–0	Don Haskins Center (804); El Paso, TX
12/05/2015*; 2:00 pm, Aggie Vision		at New Mexico State; The Battle of I-10	W 71–65	7–0	Pan American Center (768); Las Cruces, NM
12/14/2015*; 7:05 pm		UT Permian Basin	W 86–32	8–0	Don Haskins Center (954); El Paso, TX
12/18/2015*; 8:00 pm		at Long Beach State; Long Beach Classic	L 40–47	8–1	Walter Pyramid (530); Long Beach, CA
12/19/2015*; 6:00 pm		vs. UNLV; Long Beach Classic	W 60–52	9–1	Walter Pyramid (153); Long Beach, CA
12/28/2015*; 7:05 pm		Eastern New Mexico			Don Haskins Center; El Paso, TX
Conference USA regular season
01/01/2016; 1:00 pm		at Rice	W 60–54	10–1 (1–0)	Tudor Fieldhouse (508); Houston, TX
01/03/2016; 2:00 pm		at North Texas	W 75–67	11–1 (2–0)	The Super Pit (915); Denton, TX
01/07/2016; 7:05 pm		Middle Tennessee	W 84–73	12–1 (3–0)	Don Haskins Center (1,255); El Paso, TX
01/10/2016; 5:00 pm, FSN		UAB	W 62–54	13–1 (4–0)	Don Haskins Center (1,512); El Paso, TX
01/17/2016; 1:00 pm, ASN		UTSA	W 62–55	14–1 (5–0)	Don Haskins Center (1,605); El Paso, TX
01/21/2016; 5:00 pm		at Florida Atlantic	W 78–66	15–1 (6–0)	FAU Arena (747); Boca Raton, FL
01/23/2016; 5:00 pm		at FIU	W 69–57	16–1 (7–0)	FIU Arena (316); Miami, FL
01/28/2016; 7:05 pm		Southern Miss	W 72–64	17–1 (8–0)	Don Haskins Center (4,326); El Paso, TX
01/30/2016; 2:05 pm		Louisiana Tech	W 86–80	18–1 (9–0)	Don Haskins Center (3,157); El Paso, TX
02/04/2016; 4:00 pm		at Marshall	L 64–79	18–2 (9–1)	Cam Henderson Center (327); Huntington, WV
02/06/2016; 1:00 pm, FCS		at WKU	W 85–78	19–2 (10–1)	E. A. Diddle Arena (2,107); Bowling Green, KY
02/11/2016; 7:05 pm		FIU	W 70–52	20–2 (11–1)	Don Haskins Center (2,517); El Paso, TX
02/13/2016; 2:05 pm		Florida Atlantic	W 75–47	21–2 (12–1)	Don Haskins Center (2,001); El Paso, TX
02/18/2016; 5:00 pm		at Southern Miss	W 57–54	22–2 (13–1)	Reed Green Coliseum (1,484); Hattiesburg, MS
02/20/2016; 5:00 pm		at Louisiana Tech	W 72–65	23–2 (14–1)	Thomas Assembly Center (1,974); Ruston, LA
02/25/2016; 7:05 pm		Old Dominion	W 70–64	24–2 (15–1)	Don Haskins Center (2,055); El Paso, TX
02/27/2016; 2:05 pm		Charlotte	W 94–91 ^{2OT}	25–2 (16–1)	Don Haskins Center (4,012); El Paso, TX
03/03/2016; 6:00 pm		at UTSA	L 64–69	25–3 (16–2)	Convocation Center (646); San Antonio, TX
C-USA Women's Tournament
03/10/2016; 10:00 am, ASN		vs. UAB; Quarterfinals	W 62–59 ^{OT}	26–3	Bartow Arena (527); Birmingham, AL
03/11/2016; 9:00 am, CBSSN		vs. Old Dominion; Semifinals	L 54–66	26–4	BJCC Arena; Birmingham, AL
WNIT
03/17/2016*; 7:05 pm		Abilene Christian; First Round	W 66–62	27–4	Don Haskins Center (4,517); El Paso, TX
03/21/2016*; 7:05 pm		Arkansas State; Second Round	W 74–68	28–4	Don Haskins Center (5,023); El Paso, TX
03/24/2016*; 7:05 pm		TCU; Third Round	W 79–71	29–4	Don Haskins Center (7,024); El Paso, TX
03/28/2016*; 7:05 pm		Oregon; Quarterfinals	L 67–71	29–5	Don Haskins Center (9,055); El Paso, TX
*Non-conference game. ^{#}Rankings from AP Poll. (#) Tournament seedings in parentheses. All times are in Mountain Time.

== Rankings ==
Regular season polls
Poll	Pre- season	Week 2	Week 3	Week 4	Week 5	Week 6	Week 7	Week 8	Week 9	Week 10	Week 11	Week 12	Week 13	Week 14	Week 15	Week 16	Week 17	Week 18	Week 19	Final
AP	NR	NR	NR	NR	NR	RV	RV	RV	RV	RV	RV	RV	RV	RV	RV	RV	RV	RV	RV	N/A
Coaches	NR	NR	NR	NR	NR	NR	NR	NR	NR	NR	NR	RV	RV	RV	RV	RV	25	RV	NR	NR

Legend
	Increase in ranking
	Decrease in ranking
	Not ranked previous week
(RV)	Received votes

== See also ==
- 2015–16 UTEP Miners basketball team
