= 2015–16 Marshall Thundering Herd women's basketball team =

Intercollegiate basketball season

2015–16 Marshall Thundering Herd women's basketball

WNIT, First Round
- Conference: Conference USA
- Record: 21–12 (9–9 C-USA)
- Head coach: Matt Daniel (3rd season)
- Assistant coaches: Tony Kemper; Devrinn Paul; Caronica Randle
- Home arena: Cam Henderson Center

2015–16 Conference USA women's basketball standings
	Conf.				Overall
Team	W		L	PCT	W		L	PCT
UTEP	16	–	2	.889	29	–	5	.853
WKU	15	–	3	.833	27	–	7	.794
Middle Tennessee †	15	–	3	.833	24	–	9	.727
Charlotte	12	–	6	.667	19	–	12	.613
Old Dominion	10	–	8	.556	17	–	17	.500
Marshall	9	–	9	.500	21	–	12	.636
Louisiana Tech	9	–	9	.500	14	–	16	.467
UAB	7	–	11	.389	15	–	16	.484
Southern Miss	7	–	11	.389	14	–	16	.467
Rice	7	–	11	.389	9	–	22	.290
Florida Atlantic	6	–	12	.333	14	–	16	.467
UTSA	6	–	12	.333	10	–	19	.345
North Texas	5	–	13	.278	11	–	19	.367
FIU	2	–	16	.111	5	–	26	.161
† 2016 C-USA Tournament winner As of March 28, 2016; Rankings from AP poll

The 2015–16 Marshall Thundering Herd women's basketball team represented the Marshall University during the 2015–16 NCAA Division I women's basketball season. The Thundering Herd, led by third year head coach Matt Daniel, played their home games at the Cam Henderson Center and were members of Conference USA. They finished the season 17–15, 8–10 for in C-USA play to finish in a tie for sixth place. They advanced to the semifinals of the C-USA women's tournament, where they lost to Middle Tennessee. They were invited to the Women's National Invitation Tournament, where they lost in the first round to Ohio.

== Roster ==
2015–16 Marshall Thundering Herd women's basketball team
Players
Coaches

Pos.	#	Name	Height	Year	Previous school	Hometown
F	0	Talequia Hamilton	6 ft 0 in (1.83 m)	RS Jr	Cincinnati	Huntington, West Virginia
G/F	1	Leah Scott	6 ft 0 in (1.83 m)	RS Sr	Iowa Western CC	Detroit
G	2	Logan Fraley	5 ft 10 in (1.78 m)	Fr	Boyd County HS	Ashland, Kentucky
G/F	3	Ama Arkorful	5 ft 9 in (1.75 m)	Fr	Warren Central HS	Vicksburg, Mississippi
G/F	4	Khadaijia Brooks	5 ft 10 in (1.78 m)	Fr	Bristol Eastern HS	Bristol, Connecticut
G	5	McKenzie Akers	5 ft 6 in (1.68 m)	Jr	Princeton Senior HS	Princeton, West Virginia
G	11	Taylor Porter	5 ft 8 in (1.73 m)	RS So	Murray State	Fort Gay, West Virginia
G/F	14	Shayna Gore	5 ft 8 in (1.73 m)	Fr	Logan HS	Logan, West Virginia
G	15	Tana Drive	5 ft 0 in (1.52 m)	Fr	MacArthur HS	Irving, Texas
G	20	Norrisha Victrum	5 ft 5 in (1.65 m)	Sr	Columbia HS	Columbia, South Carolina
F	21	Chelsey Romero	6 ft 1 in (1.85 m)	Jr	Kecoughtan HS	Hampton, Virginia
G	22	Kiana Evans	6 ft 0 in (1.83 m)	Jr	Huntington HS	Huntington, West Virginia
G	23	Enjonae Chambers	5 ft 7 in (1.7 m)	Jr	Conway HS	Conaway, Arkansas
G/F	33	Madison Morris	6 ft 0 in (1.83 m)	Fr	Spring Valley HS	Huntington, West Virginia
C	34	Hope Lester	6 ft 0 in (1.83 m)	Fr	West Side HS	Hanover, West Virginia

Head coach

- Matt Daniel (Harding)

Assistant coach(es)

- Tony Kemper (Fort Hays State)
- Devrinn Paul (Kentucky State)
- Caronica Randle (Central Arkansas)

Legend

- (C) Team captain
- (S) Suspended
- (I) Ineligible
- (W) Walk-on
- Injured
- Current redshirt

Roster

== Schedule ==
Date time, TV	Rank^{#}	Opponent^{#}	Result	Record	Site (attendance) city, state
Exhibition
11/04/2015*; 6:00 pm		Kentucky Christian	W 113–36		Cam Henderson Center (872); Huntington, West Virginia
Non-conference regular season
11/13/2015*; 5:30 pm		at Morehead State; Morehead State Classic	W 104–101	1–0	Ellis Johnson Arena (1,676); Morehead, Kentucky
11/15/2015*; 1:00 pm		Brescia; Morehead State Classic	W 92–40	2–0	Cam Henderson Center; Huntington, West Virginia
11/18/2015*; 6:00 pm		Rhode Island	W 72–62	3–0	Cam Henderson Center (631); Huntington, West Virginia
11/22/2015*; 1:00 pm		NJIT	W 63–50	4–0	Cam Henderson Center (384); Huntington, West Virginia
11/27/2015*; 4:00 pm		Cornell	W 73–47	5–0	Cam Henderson Center (4,683); Huntington, West Virginia
12/05/2015*; 4:00 pm		Alabama A&M	W 81–45	6–0	Cam Henderson Center (443); Huntington, West Virginia
12/13/2015*; 4:00 pm		vs. West Virginia; Chesapeake Energy Capital Classic	L 60–66	6–1	Charleston Civic Center (3,173); Charleston, West Virginia
12/17/2015*; 12:00 pm		Saint Francis (PA)	W 81–73	7–1	Cam Henderson Center (289); Huntington, West Virginia
12/20/2015*; 1:00 pm		Norfolk State	W 81–67	8–1	Cam Henderson Center (323); Huntington, West Virginia
12/22/2015*; 12:00 pm		West Virginia Tech	W 83–39	9–1	Cam Henderson Center (501); Huntington, West Virginia
12/28/2015*; 3:00 pm, ESPN3		at Southern Illinois	W 61–55	10–1	SIU Arena (400); Carbondale, Illinois
Conference USA regular season
01/02/2016; 3:00 pm		at WKU	L 52–81	10–2 (0–1)	E. A. Diddle Arena (1,413); Bowling Green, Kentucky
01/07/2016; 7:00 pm		at Florida Atlantic	L 73–84	10–3 (0–2)	FAU Arena (483); Boca Raton, Florida
01/09/2016; 2:00 pm		at FIU	W 65–58	11–3 (1–2)	FIU Arena (302); Miami
01/14/2016; 6:00 pm		North Texas	L 63–71	11–4 (1–3)	Cam Henderson Center (327); Huntington, West Virginia
01/16/2016; 1:00 pm		Rice	W 81–52	12–4 (2–3)	Cam Henderson Center (414); Huntington, West Virginia
01/21/2016; 6:00 pm		Charlotte	L 61–64	12–5 (2–4)	Cam Henderson Center (474); Huntington, West Virginia
01/24/2016; 1:00 pm		Old Dominion	W 80–62	13–5 (3–4)	Cam Henderson Center (652); Huntington, West Virginia
01/28/2016; 7:30 pm		at Middle Tennessee	L 54–65	13–6 (3–5)	Murphy Center (3,958); Murfreesboro, Tennessee
01/30/2016; 3:00 pm		at UAB	W 64–61	14–6 (4–5)	Bartow Arena (352); Birmingham, AL
02/04/2016; 6:00 pm		UTEP	W 79–64	15–6 (5–5)	Cam Henderson Center (327); Huntington, West Virginia
02/06/2016; 1:00 pm		UTSA	W 80–76	16–6 (6–5)	Cam Henderson Center (812); Huntington, West Virginia
02/14/2016; 1:00 pm, ASN		WKU	L 76–80	16–7 (6–6)	Cam Henderson Center (472); Huntington, West Virginia
02/18/2016; 7:00 pm		at Charlotte	L 77–87	16–8 (6–7)	Dale F. Halton Arena (909); Charlotte, North Carolina
02/20/2016; 4:00 pm		at Old Dominion	L 55–77	16–9 (6–8)	Ted Constant Convocation Center (2,487); Norfolk, Virginia
02/25/2016; 11:30 am		UAB	W 73–65	17–9 (7–8)	Cam Henderson Center (1,855); Huntington, West Virginia
02/27/2016; 1:00 pm		Middle Tennessee	L 73–79	17–10 (7–9)	Cam Henderson Center (876); Huntington, West Virginia
03/03/2016; 7:30 pm		at Louisiana Tech	W 54–52	18–10 (8–9)	Thomas Assembly Center (1,803); Ruston, Louisiana
03/05/2016; 5:00 pm		at Southern Miss	W 63–53	19–10 (9–9)	Reed Green Coliseum (1,514); Hattiesburg, Mississippi
Conference USA Women's Tournament
03/09/2016; 8:30 pm, ASN		vs. FIU; Second Round	W 76–44	20–10	Bartow Arena; Birmingham, AL
03/10/2016; 8:30 pm, ASN		vs. WKU; Quarterfinals	W 66–63	21–10	Bartow Arena (499); Birmingham, AL
03/11/2016; 1:30 pm, CBSSN		vs. Middle Tennessee; Semifinals	L 41–69	21–11	Legacy Arena; Birmingham, AL
WNIT
03/17/2016; 7:00 pm		at Ohio; First Round	L 68–76	21–12	Convocation Center (1,172); Athens, Ohio
*Non-conference game. ^{#}Rankings from AP Poll. (#) Tournament seedings in parentheses. All times are in Eastern Time.

== See also ==
- 2015–16 Marshall Thundering Herd men's basketball team
