= 2015–16 North Texas Mean Green women's basketball team =

American college basketball season

2015–16 North Texas Mean Green women's basketball
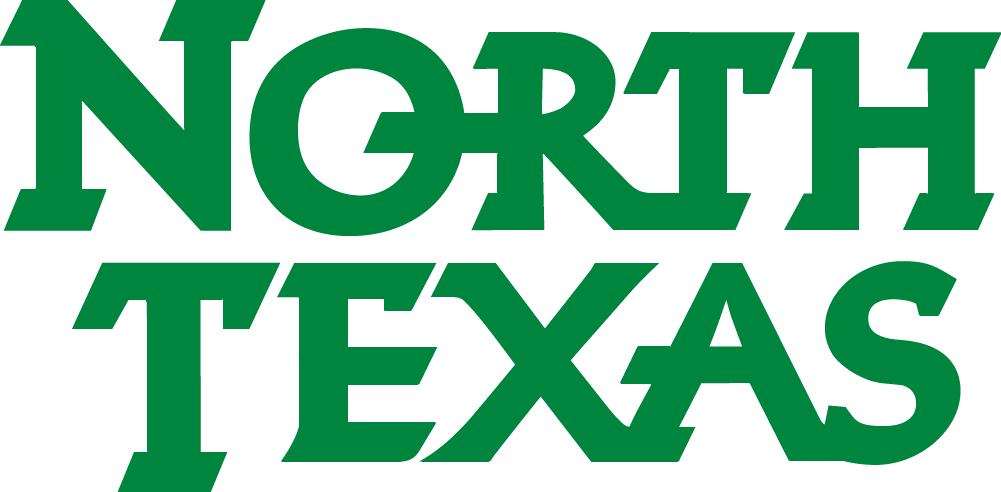
- Conference: Conference USA
- Record: 11–19 (5–13 C-USA)
- Head coach: Jalie Mitchell (1st season)
- Assistant coaches: Bobby Brasel; Aisha Stewart; Kasondra Foreman
- Home arena: The Super Pit

2015–16 Conference USA women's basketball standings
	Conf.				Overall
Team	W		L	PCT	W		L	PCT
UTEP	16	–	2	.889	29	–	5	.853
WKU	15	–	3	.833	27	–	7	.794
Middle Tennessee †	15	–	3	.833	24	–	9	.727
Charlotte	12	–	6	.667	19	–	12	.613
Old Dominion	10	–	8	.556	17	–	17	.500
Marshall	9	–	9	.500	21	–	12	.636
Louisiana Tech	9	–	9	.500	14	–	16	.467
UAB	7	–	11	.389	15	–	16	.484
Southern Miss	7	–	11	.389	14	–	16	.467
Rice	7	–	11	.389	9	–	22	.290
Florida Atlantic	6	–	12	.333	14	–	16	.467
UTSA	6	–	12	.333	10	–	19	.345
North Texas	5	–	13	.278	11	–	19	.367
FIU	2	–	16	.111	5	–	26	.161
† 2016 C-USA Tournament winner As of March 28, 2016; Rankings from AP poll

The 2015–16 North Texas Mean Green women's basketball team represented the University of North Texas during the 2015–16 NCAA Division I women's basketball season. The Mean Green, led by first year head coach Jalie Mitchell, played their home games UNT Coliseum, also known as The Super Pit, and were third year members of Conference USA. They finished the season 11–19, 5–13 in C-USA play to finish in thirteenth place. They advanced to the second round of the C-USA women's tournament to Old Dominion.

== Roster ==
2015–16 North Texas Mean Green women's basketball team
Players
Coaches

Pos.	#	Name	Height	Year	Previous school	Hometown
G	1	Tyara Warren (I) (redshirt)	5 ft 9 in (1.75 m)	So	Plano West; West Virginia	Plano, TX
G	2	Teadra Jones	5 ft 9 in (1.75 m)	Sr	Booker T. Washington; Pensacola SC	Pensacola, FL
G	3	Kelsey Criner	5 ft 7 in (1.7 m)	Jr	Lincoln HS; New Mexico JC	Dallas, TX
G	10	Kasiney Williams	5 ft 1 in (1.55 m)	Sr	Zachary HS; Baton Rouge CC	Baton Rouge, LA
G	13	Terriell Bradley (I) (redshirt)	5 ft 10 in (1.78 m)	So	Mansfield HS; Kansas	Arlington, TX
G	14	Candice Adams	5 ft 8 in (1.73 m)	Jr	Cedar Hill HS	Cedar Hill, TX
G	15	Brooke Jolivette	5 ft 10 in (1.78 m)	Fr	Kingwood HS	Houston, TX
G	20	Terra Ellison	5 ft 11 in (1.8 m)	Jr	The Colony HS	The Colony, TX
F	21	Nekia Jones (I) (redshirt)	5 ft 11 in (1.8 m)	Jr	Ozen HS; Texas	Beaumont, TX
G	22	Stabresa McDaniel (I) (redshirt)	5 ft 10 in (1.78 m)	Jr	Skyline HS; Minnesota	Dallas, TX
F	23	Acheil Tac	6 ft 2 in (1.88 m)	Sr	Sachse HS	Garland, TX
F	24	Bria Frierson	6 ft 0 in (1.83 m)	So	Frisco Liberty HS	Cincinnati, OH
C	30	Tosin Mabodu	6 ft 1 in (1.85 m)	So	Homewood-Flossmor HS; Murray State College	Chicago, IL
F	33	Taylor Roof	5 ft 11 in (1.8 m)	Fr	Marcus HS	Lewisville, TX
G	34	Kiara Davis	5 ft 10 in (1.78 m)	RS Jr	North Crowley HS	Fort Worth, TX

Head coach

- Jalie Mitchell (North Texas)

Assistant coach(es)

- Bobby Brasel (UT Permian Basin)
- Aisha Stewart (Catawba)
- Kasondra Foreman (North Texas)

Legend

- (C) Team captain
- (S) Suspended
- (I) Ineligible
- (W) Walk-on
- Injured
- Current redshirt

Roster

== Schedule ==
Date time, TV	Rank^{#}	Opponent^{#}	Result	Record	Site (attendance) city, state
Exhibition
11/07/2015*; 2:00 pm		Texas Woman's	W 69–59		The Super Pit; Denton, TX
Non-conference regular Season
11/13/2015*; 5:00 pm		San Francisco	L 61–69	0–1	The Super Pit (550); Denton, TX
11/16/2015*; 7:00 pm, FCSC		at No. 17 Oklahoma	W 61–57	1–1	Lloyd Noble Center (3,829); Norman, OK
11/21/2015*; 7:00 pm		at Texas State	L 62–64	1–2	Strahan Coliseum (1,247); San Marcos, TX
11/27/2015*; 2:00 pm		Arizona	L 44–51	1–3	The Super Pit (961); Denton, TX
12/01/2015*; 7:00 pm		SMU	W 60–57	2–3	The Super Pit (819); Denton, TX
12/04/2015*; 7:00 pm		Weber State; Hospitality Hill Tournament	L 38–45	2–4	The Super Pit (684); Denton, TX
12/05/2015*; 2:30 pm		IUPUI; Hospitality Hill Tournament	W 68–67	3–4	The Super Pit (867); Denton, TX
12/13/2015*; 1:00 pm		at Iona	L 51–62	3–5	Hynes Athletic Center (503); New Rochelle, NY
12/16/2015*; 6:00 pm		at La Salle	W 69–63	4–5	Tom Gola Arena (217); Philadelphia, PA
12/21/2015*; 2:00 pm		at Incarnate Word	W 62–55	5–5	McDermott Convocation Center (255); San Antonio, TX
12/29/2015*; 5:30 pm		Oklahoma Panhandle State			The Super Pit; Denton, TX
Conference USA regular Season
01/01/2016; 2:00 pm		UTSA	W 68–58	6–5 (1–0)	The Super Pit (882); Denton, TX
01/03/2016; 3:00 pm		UTEP	L 67–75	6–6 (1–1)	The Super Pit (915); Denton, TX
01/10/2016; 2:00 pm, ASN		at Rice	L 97–100 ^{3OT}	6–7 (1–2)	Tudor Fieldhouse (726); Houston, TX
01/14/2016; 5:00 pm		at Marshall	W 71–63	7–7 (2–2)	Cam Henderson Center (327); Huntington, WV
01/16/2016; 2:00 pm		at WKU	L 53–65	7–8 (2–3)	E. A. Diddle Arena (1,191); Bowling Green, KY
01/21/2016; 7:00 pm		Middle Tennessee	L 52–76	7–9 (2–4)	The Super Pit (746); Denton, TX
01/23/2016; 2:00 pm		UAB	W 53–51	8–9 (3–4)	The Super Pit (916); Denton, TX
01/30/2016; 2:00 pm		Rice	L 73–79 ^{2OT}	8–10 (3–5)	The Super Pit (1,721); Denton, TX
02/04/2016; 6:00 pm		at Southern Miss	L 38–57	8–11 (3–6)	Reed Green Coliseum (1,576); Hattiesburg, MS
02/06/2016; 6:00 pm		at Louisiana Tech	L 71–77	8–12 (3–7)	Thomas Assembly Center (1,769); Ruston, LA
02/11/2016; 6:00 pm		Old Dominion	L 48–65	8–13 (3–8)	The Super Pit (484); Denton, TX
02/13/2016; 2:00 pm		Charlotte	L 70–82	8–14 (3–9)	The Super Pit (325); Denton, TX
02/18/2016; 6:00 pm		at FIU	W 58–40	9–14 (4–9)	FIU Arena (334); Miami, FL
02/20/2016; 4:00 pm		at Florida Atlantic	L 61–71	9–15 (4–10)	FAU Arena (564); Boca Raton, FL
02/25/2016; 7:00 pm		Louisiana Tech	L 67–78	9–16 (4–11)	The Super Pit (670); Denton, TX
02/27/2016; 2:00 pm		Southern Miss	W 57–55	10–16 (5–11)	The Super Pit (638); Denton, TX
03/03/2016; 7:00 pm		at Old Dominion	L 55–62	10–17 (5–12)	Ted Constant Convocation Center (1,663); Norfolk, VA
03/05/2016; 6:00 pm		at Charlotte	L 69–72	10–18 (5–13)	Dale F. Halton Arena (1,143); Charlotte, NC
Conference USA Women's Tournament
03/08/2016; 11:00 am, ASN		vs. Florida Atlantic; First Round	W 79–74	11–18	Bartow Arena (273); Birmingham, AL
03/09/2016; 1:30 pm, ASN		vs. Old Dominion; Second Round	L 55–62	11–19	Bartow Arena (311); Birmingham, AL
*Non-conference game. ^{#}Rankings from AP Poll. (#) Tournament seedings in parentheses. All times are in Central Time.

== See also ==
- 2015–16 North Texas Mean Green men's basketball team
