= 2015–16 UAB Blazers women's basketball team =

Intercollegiate basketball season

2015–16 UAB Blazers women's basketball
- Conference: Conference USA
- Record: 15–16 (7–11 C-USA)
- Head coach: Randy Norton (3rd season)
- Assistant coaches: Taren Martin; Emily Hanley
- Home arena: Bartow Arena

2015–16 Conference USA women's basketball standings
	Conf.				Overall
Team	W		L	PCT	W		L	PCT
UTEP	16	–	2	.889	29	–	5	.853
WKU	15	–	3	.833	27	–	7	.794
Middle Tennessee †	15	–	3	.833	24	–	9	.727
Charlotte	12	–	6	.667	19	–	12	.613
Old Dominion	10	–	8	.556	17	–	17	.500
Marshall	9	–	9	.500	21	–	12	.636
Louisiana Tech	9	–	9	.500	14	–	16	.467
UAB	7	–	11	.389	15	–	16	.484
Southern Miss	7	–	11	.389	14	–	16	.467
Rice	7	–	11	.389	9	–	22	.290
Florida Atlantic	6	–	12	.333	14	–	16	.467
UTSA	6	–	12	.333	10	–	19	.345
North Texas	5	–	13	.278	11	–	19	.367
FIU	2	–	16	.111	5	–	26	.161
† 2016 C-USA Tournament winner As of March 28, 2016; Rankings from AP poll

The 2015–16 UAB Blazers women's basketball team represented the University of Alabama at Birmingham during the 2015–16 NCAA Division I women's basketball season. The Blazers, led by second year head coach Randy Norton, played their home games at the Bartow Arena and were members of Conference USA. They finished the season 15–16, 7–11 in C-USA play to finish in a 3-way tie for eighth place. They advanced to the quarterfinals of the C-USA women's tournament, where they lost to UTEP.

== Roster ==
2015–16 UAB Blazers women's basketball team
Players
Coaches

Pos.	#	Name	Height	Year	Previous school	Hometown
G	2	Whytney Singleton	5 ft 6 in (1.68 m)	So	Blount HS	Mobile, AL
G	4	Bianca Dufelmeier	5 ft 6 in (1.68 m)	RS Sr	Kirkwood Community College	Canberra, Australia
G	5	Lauren McGraw	5 ft 8 in (1.73 m)	RS Sr	Memphis	Lauderhill, FL
G	11	Janeka Williams	5 ft 6 in (1.68 m)	Jr	East HS	Memphis, TN
F	12	Keonna Farmer	6 ft 0 in (1.83 m)	RS So	Auburn	Birmingham, AL
G	14	T'erra Lewis	5 ft 6 in (1.68 m)	So	Robert E. Lee HS	Montgomery, AL
F	15	Brittany Winborne	6 ft 0 in (1.83 m)	Sr	Catholic HS	Baltimore, MD
G	20	Deanna Kuzmanic	5 ft 9 in (1.75 m)	Fr	Wheeling HS	Wheeling, IL
G	21	Chelsee Black	5 ft 6 in (1.68 m)	Sr	Bessemer City HS	Bessemer, AL
G	22	Maya Garland	5 ft 6 in (1.68 m)	So	Fenwick HS	River Forest, IL
F	23	Kayla Anderson	6 ft 1 in (1.85 m)	Sr	Hoover HS	Hoover, AL
F	34	Khoria Newman	5 ft 10 in (1.78 m)	Sr	MacArthur HS	Irving, TX
F	40	Bailee Wolfe	6 ft 3 in (1.91 m)	Fr	Bartow HS	Lakeland, FL
F	41	Dy'man Webb	6 ft 1 in (1.85 m)	Sr	Flint Hamady HS	Flint, MI

Head coach

Randy Norton (Iowa)

Assistant coach(es)

Taren Martin (Illinois State)
Emily Hanley (Illinois State)

Legend

- (C) Team captain
- (S) Suspended
- (I) Ineligible
- (W) Walk-on
- Injured
- Current redshirt

Roster

== Schedule ==
Date time, TV	Rank^{#}	Opponent^{#}	Result	Record	Site (attendance) city, state
Exhibition
10/31/2015*; 2:00 pm		Mississippi College	W 75–36		Bartow Arena; Birmingham, AL
11/05/2015*; 7:00 pm		Miles	W 75–44		Bartow Arena; Birmingham, AL
Non-conference regular season
11/13/2015*; 5:30 pm		at Auburn	L 71–85	0–1	Auburn Arena (3,110); Auburn, AL
11/15/2015*; 4:00 pm		at Belmont	L 62–63	0–2	Curb Event Center (457); Nashville, TN
11/20/2015*; 11:30 am		South Carolina State	W 71–38	1–2	Bartow Arena; Birmingham, AL
11/22/2015*; 5:00 pm, ESPN3		at No. 6 Florida State	L 44–84	1–3	Donald L. Tucker Civic Center (2,394); Tallahassee, FL
11/26/2015*; 3:00 pm		vs. High Point; Women's Cancún Challenge Riviera Division	W 56–46	2–3	Hard Rock Hotel Riviera Maya (133); Cancún, Mexico
11/27/2015*; 3:00 pm		vs. NC State; Women's Cancún Challenge Riviera Division	L 56–67	2–4	Hard Rock Hotel Riviera Maya (133); Cancún, Mexico
12/03/2015*; 7:00 pm		Arkansas–Pine Bluff	W 82–32	3–4	Bartow Arena (366); Birmingham, AL
12/05/2015*; 2:00 pm		Mississippi Valley State	W 80–33	4–4	Bartow Arena (286); Birmingham, AL
12/13/2015*; 2:00 pm		at South Alabama	W 53–39	5–4	Mitchell Center (419); Mobile, AL
12/18/2015*; 7:00 pm		Troy	W 89–67	6–4	Bartow Arena (258); Birmingham, AL
12/21/2015*; 1:00 pm		Samford	W 61–41	7–4	Bartow Arena (323); Birmingham, AL
Conference USA regular season
01/03/2016; 2:00 pm		at Middle Tennessee	L 40–68	7–5 (0–1)	Murphy Center (3,911); Murfreesboro, TN
01/07/2016; 2:00 pm		at UTSA	L 52–54	7–6 (0–2)	Convocation Center (307); San Antonio, TX
01/10/2016; 6:00 pm, FSN		at UTEP	L 54–62	7–7 (0–3)	Don Haskins Center (1,512); El Paso, TX
01/14/2016; 7:00 pm		Old Dominion	W 58–55	8–7 (1–3)	Bartow Arena (226); Birmingham, AL
01/16/2016; 2:00 pm		Charlotte	W 75–57	9–7 (2–3)	Bartow Arena (473); Birmingham, AL
01/21/2016; 7:00 pm		at Rice	W 64–55	10–7 (3–3)	Tudor Fieldhouse (305); Houston, TX
01/23/2016; 2:00 pm		at North Texas	L 51–53	10–8 (3–4)	The Super Pit (916); Denton, TX
01/28/2016; 7:00 pm		WKU	L 49–63	10–9 (3–5)	Bartow Arena (521); Birmingham, AL
01/30/2016; 2:00 pm		Marshall	L 61–64	10–10 (3–6)	Bartow Arena (352); Birmingham, AL
02/04/2016; 6:00 pm		at FIU	L 61–72	10–11 (3–7)	FIU Arena (342); Miami, FL
02/06/2016; 4:00 pm		at Florida Atlantic	W 67–62	11–11 (4–7)	FAU Arena (532); Boca Raton, FL
02/11/2016; 7:00 pm		Southern Miss	W 53–49	12–11 (5–7)	Bartow Arena (312); Birmingham, AL
02/13/2016; 2:00 pm		Louisiana Tech	W 64–49	13–11 (6–7)	Bartow Arena (688); Birmingham, AL
02/21/2016; 12:00 pm, ASN		Middle Tennessee	L 72–77 ^{OT}	13–12 (6–8)	Bartow Arena (278); Birmingham, AL
02/25/2016; 10:30 am		at Marshall	L 65–73	13–13 (6–9)	Cam Henderson Center (1,855); Huntington, WV
02/27/2016; 2:00 pm, FCS		at WKU	L 55–64	13–14 (6–10)	E. A. Diddle Arena (1,851); Bowling Green, KY
03/03/2016; 7:00 pm		FIU	W 71–42	14–14 (7–10)	Bartow Arena (446); Birmingham, AL
03/05/2016; 2:00 pm		Florida Atlantic	L 51–52	14–15 (7–11)	Bartow Arena (439); Birmingham, AL
Conference USA Women's Tournament
03/09/2016; 11:00 am, ASN		vs. Southern Miss; Second Round	W 64–46	15–15	Bartow Arena (356); Birmingham, AL
03/10/2016; 11:30 am, ASN		vs. UTEP; Quarterfinals	L 59–62 ^{OT}	15–16	Bartow Arena (527); Birmingham, AL
*Non-conference game. ^{#}Rankings from AP Poll. (#) Tournament seedings in parentheses. All times are in Central Time.

== See also ==
- 2015–16 UAB Blazers men's basketball team
