= 2015–16 Southern Miss Lady Eagles basketball team =

Intercollegiate basketball season

2015–16 Southern Miss Lady Eagles basketball

Lady Eagle Thanksgiving Tournament champions
- Conference: Conference USA
- Record: 14–16 (7–11 C-USA)
- Head coach: Joye Lee-McNelis (12th season)
- Assistant coaches: Jordan Dupuy; Alaura Sharp; Pauline Love
- Home arena: Reed Green Coliseum

2015–16 Conference USA women's basketball standings
	Conf.				Overall
Team	W		L	PCT	W		L	PCT
UTEP	16	–	2	.889	29	–	5	.853
WKU	15	–	3	.833	27	–	7	.794
Middle Tennessee †	15	–	3	.833	24	–	9	.727
Charlotte	12	–	6	.667	19	–	12	.613
Old Dominion	10	–	8	.556	17	–	17	.500
Marshall	9	–	9	.500	21	–	12	.636
Louisiana Tech	9	–	9	.500	14	–	16	.467
UAB	7	–	11	.389	15	–	16	.484
Southern Miss	7	–	11	.389	14	–	16	.467
Rice	7	–	11	.389	9	–	22	.290
Florida Atlantic	6	–	12	.333	14	–	16	.467
UTSA	6	–	12	.333	10	–	19	.345
North Texas	5	–	13	.278	11	–	19	.367
FIU	2	–	16	.111	5	–	26	.161
† 2016 C-USA Tournament winner As of March 28, 2016; Rankings from AP poll

The 2015–16 Southern Miss Lady Eagles basketball team represented the University of Southern Mississippi during the 2015–16 NCAA Division I women's basketball season. The Lady Eagles, led by twelfth-year head coach Joye Lee-McNelis, played their home games at Reed Green Coliseum in Hattiesburg, Mississippi and were members of Conference USA (C-USA). They finished the season 14–16, 7–11 in C-USA play, to finish in a three-way tie for eighth place. They lost in the first round of the C-USA women's tournament to UAB.

== Roster ==
2015–16 Southern Miss Golden Eagles women's basketball team
Players
Coaches

Pos.	#	Name	Height	Year	Previous school	Hometown
G	1	Tajanay Veiga	5 ft 6 in (1.68 m)	Jr	Midland College	Boston, MA
F	2	Lashyra Cotton	5 ft 11 in (1.8 m)	Jr	East Side HS	Cleveland, MS
G	3	Keri Jewett-Giles	5 ft 6 in (1.68 m)	Fr	Dunbar HS	Fort Myers, FL
F	5	Ariel Sneed	6 ft 0 in (1.83 m)	Jr	Kirkwood CC	Harvey, IL
G	10	Jerontay Clemons	5 ft 8 in (1.73 m)	Sr	Coldwater HS	Coldwater, MS
G	12	Brittanny Dinkins	5 ft 7 in (1.7 m)	Jr	Norland HS	Miami, FL
G	14	Katie Dozier	5 ft 6 in (1.68 m)	So	Walton HS	Marietta, GA
C	15	Caitlin Jenkins	6 ft 3 in (1.91 m)	Fr	Huntington HS	Shreveport, LA
G/F	21	Jayla King	5 ft 9 in (1.75 m)	RS So	South Florida	Pensacola, FL
G	22	Megan Brown	5 ft 10 in (1.78 m)	So	Salmen HS	Slidell, LA
G	24	Brittny Norris	5 ft 9 in (1.75 m)	Jr	Tyler JC	Dallas, TX
C	25	Jessica Powers	6 ft 6 in (1.98 m)	RS Fr	Pearl River Central HS	Carriere, MS
F	44	Shayla Wilson	6 ft 1 in (1.85 m)	Jr	St. Petersburg College	Tampa, FL

Head coach

- Joye Lee-McNelis (Southern Miss)

Assistant coach(es)

- Jordan Dupuy (Southern Miss)
- Alaura Sharp (Southwest Minnesota State)
- Pauline Love (Southern Miss)

Legend

- (C) Team captain
- (S) Suspended
- (I) Ineligible
- (W) Walk-on
- Injured
- Current redshirt

Roster
Last update: August 3, 2024

== Rankings ==
Regular-season polls
Poll	Pre- season	Week 2	Week 3	Week 4	Week 5	Week 6	Week 7	Week 8	Week 9	Week 10	Week 11	Week 12	Week 13	Week 14	Week 15	Week 16	Week 17	Week 18	Week 19	Final
AP																				
Coaches																				

Legend
	Increase in ranking
	Decrease in ranking
	No change
(RV)	Received votes

== Schedule ==
Date time, TV	Rank^{#}	Opponent^{#}	Result	Record	Site (attendance) city, state
Exhibition
November 7, 2015*; 4:00 p.m.		West Alabama	W 90–49		Reed Green Coliseum; Hattiesburg, MS
Non-conference regular season
November 13, 2015*; 11:00 a.m.		Alabama State; Preseason WNIT first round	W 65–44	1–0	Reed Green Coliseum (2,498); Hattiesburg, MS
November 16, 2015*; 7:00 p.m.		at No. 5 Baylor; Preseason WNIT second round	L 42–97	1–1	Ferrell Center (5,400); Waco, TX
November 20, 2015*; 5:30 p.m.		at No. 24 Chattanooga; Preseason WNIT consolation round	L 48–53 ^{OT}	1–2	McKenzie Arena (1,111); Chattanooga, TN
November 27, 2015*; 5:00 p.m.		Mississippi Valley State; Lady Eagle Thanksgiving Tournament semifinals	W 71–55	2–2	Reed Green Coliseum (1,320); Hattiesburg, MS
November 28, 2015*; 2:00 p.m.		Nicholls State; Lady Eagle Thanksgiving Tournament championship	W 56–48	3–2	Reed Green Coliseum (1,262); Hattiesburg, MS
December 1, 2015*; 6:00 p.m.		at Tennessee Tech	W 69–57	4–2	Eblen Center (576); Cookeville, TN
December 6, 2015*; 2:00 p.m.		South Alabama	W 71–51	5–2	Reed Green Coliseum (1,294); Hattiesburg, MS
December 12, 2015*; 4:00 p.m.		Ole Miss	W 57–38	6–2	Reed Green Coliseum (1,632); Hattiesburg, MS
December 16, 2015*; 7:00 p.m.		at No. 9 Mississippi State	L 65–78	6–3	Humphrey Coliseum (3,505); Starkville, MS
December 20, 2015*; 4:00 p.m., ASN		vs. North Carolina; Carolinas Challenge	L 62–69	6–4	Myrtle Beach Convention Center; Myrtle Beach, SC
December 28, 2015*; 6:00 p.m.		William Carey	W 75–34	7–4	Reed Green Coliseum (1,392); Hattiesburg, MS
Conference USA regular season
January 2, 2016; 4:00 p.m.		Louisiana Tech	W 69–59	8–4 (1–0)	Reed Green Coliseum (1,525); Hattiesburg, MS
January 7, 2016; 11:00 a.m.		at Charlotte	L 59–80	8–5 (1–1)	Dale F. Halton Arena (5,437); Charlotte, NC
January 9, 2016; 3:00 p.m.		at Old Dominion	L 45–53	8–6 (1–2)	Ted Constant Convocation Center (1,975); Norfolk, VA
January 14, 2016; 8:00 p.m., FSN		Florida Atlantic	W 89–80	9–6 (2–2)	Reed Green Coliseum (1,546); Hattiesburg, MS
January 16, 2016; 4:00 p.m.		FIU	W 83–55	10–6 (3–2)	Reed Green Coliseum (1,660); Hattiesburg, MS
January 24, 2016; 12:00 p.m., ASN		at Louisiana Tech	L 37–72	10–7 (3–3)	Thomas Assembly Center (1,724); Ruston, LA
January 28, 2016; 8:05 p.m.		at UTEP	L 64–72	10–8 (3–4)	Don Haskins Center (4,326); El Paso, TX
January 30, 2016; 2:00 p.m.		at UTSA	L 41–47	10–9 (3–5)	Convocation Center (554); San Antonio, TX
February 4, 2016; 6:00 p.m.		North Texas	W 57–38	11–9 (4–5)	Reed Green Coliseum (1,576); Hattiesburg, MS
February 6, 2016; 4:00 p.m.		Rice	W 68–62	12–9 (5–5)	Reed Green Coliseum (1,522); Hattiesburg, MS
February 11, 2016; 7:00 p.m.		at UAB	L 49–53	12–10 (5–6)	Bartow Arena (312); Birmingham, AL
February 13, 2016; 5:00 p.m.		at Middle Tennessee	L 44–74	12–11 (5–7)	Murphy Center (5,229); Murfreesboro, TN
February 18, 2016; 6:00 p.m.		UTEP	L 54–57	12–12 (5–8)	Reed Green Coliseum (1,484); Hattiesburg, MS
February 20, 2016; 4:00 p.m.		UTSA	W 65–53	13–12 (6–8)	Reed Green Coliseum (1,549); Hattiesburg, MS
February 25, 2016; 7:00 p.m.		at Rice	W 59–49	14–12 (7–8)	Tudor Fieldhouse (404); Houston, TX
February 27, 2016; 2:00 p.m.		at North Texas	L 55–57	14–13 (7–9)	The Super Pit (638); Denton, TX
March 3, 2016; 6:00 p.m.		WKU	L 53–54	14–14 (7–10)	Reed Green Coliseum (1,382); Hattiesburg, MS
March 5, 2016; 4:00 p.m.		Marshall	L 53–63	14–15 (7–11)	Reed Green Coliseum (1,514); Hattiesburg, MS
Conference USA women's tournament
March 9, 2016; 11:00 a.m., ASN		vs. UAB; Second round	L 46–64	14–16	Bartow Arena (356); Birmingham, AL
*Non-conference game. ^{#}Rankings from AP poll. (#) Tournament seedings in parentheses. All times are in Central.

== See also ==
- 2015–16 Southern Miss Golden Eagles basketball team
