= 2015–16 Charlotte 49ers women's basketball team =

Intercollegiate basketball season

2015–16 Charlotte 49ers women's basketball
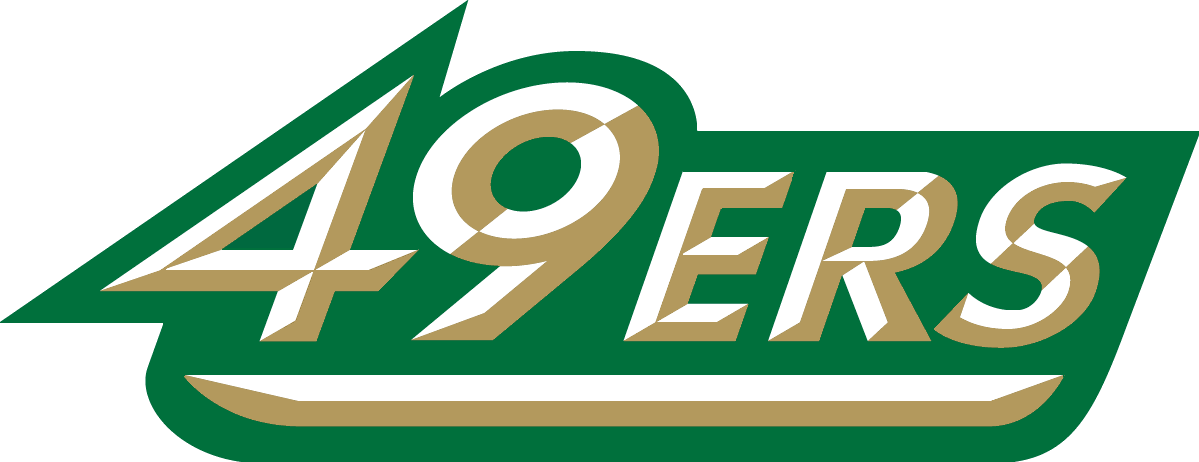

GSU Thanksgiving Classic Champions

WNIT, First Round
- Conference: Conference USA
- Record: 19–12 (12–6 C-USA)
- Head coach: Cara Consuegra (4th season)
- Assistant coaches: Joanne Aluka-White; Randi Henderson; Nicole Woods
- Home arena: Dale F. Halton Arena

2015–16 Conference USA women's basketball standings
	Conf.				Overall
Team	W		L	PCT	W		L	PCT
UTEP	16	–	2	.889	29	–	5	.853
WKU	15	–	3	.833	27	–	7	.794
Middle Tennessee †	15	–	3	.833	24	–	9	.727
Charlotte	12	–	6	.667	19	–	12	.613
Old Dominion	10	–	8	.556	17	–	17	.500
Marshall	9	–	9	.500	21	–	12	.636
Louisiana Tech	9	–	9	.500	14	–	16	.467
UAB	7	–	11	.389	15	–	16	.484
Southern Miss	7	–	11	.389	14	–	16	.467
Rice	7	–	11	.389	9	–	22	.290
Florida Atlantic	6	–	12	.333	14	–	16	.467
UTSA	6	–	12	.333	10	–	19	.345
North Texas	5	–	13	.278	11	–	19	.367
FIU	2	–	16	.111	5	–	26	.161
† 2016 C-USA Tournament winner As of March 28, 2016; Rankings from AP poll

The 2015–16 Charlotte 49ers women's basketball team represented the University of North Carolina at Charlotte during the 2015–16 NCAA Division I women's basketball season. The 49ers, led by fourth year head coach Cara Consuegra, played their home games at Dale F. Halton Arena and were members of Conference USA. They finished the season 19–12, 12–8 in C-USA play to finish fourth place. They lost in the quarterfinals of the C-USA women's tournament to Old Dominion. They were invited to the Women's National Invitation Tournament, where they lost to Wake Forest in the first round.

== Roster ==
2015–16 Charlotte 49ers women's basketball team
Players
Coaches

Pos.	#	Name	Height	Year	Previous school	Hometown
G	0	Amaya Ransom	5 ft 11 in (1.8 m)	So	Landstown	Virginia Beach, VA
G	1	Ciara Gregory	5 ft 7 in (1.7 m)	Jr	Jeannette	Jeannette, PA
F	2	Mintrell McKoy	6 ft 3 in (1.91 m)	RS Fr	Jack Britt	Fayetteville, NC
G	3	Ayanna Holmes	5 ft 7 in (1.7 m)	Sr	Salisbury	Salisbury, NC
G	4	Laia Raventós	5 ft 7 in (1.7 m)	Fr	IES Joaquim Blume	Santa Eulàlia de Riuprimer, Spain
G	11	Griffin Dempsey	5 ft 6 in (1.68 m)	So	St. Joseph Central Catholic	Huntington, WV
F	15	Nyilah Jamison-Myers	6 ft 3 in (1.91 m)	RS Jr	Orangeburg-Wilkinson; Clemson	Orangeburg, SC
F	20	Kira Gordon	6 ft 0 in (1.83 m)	Sr	Kennesaw Mountain	Kennesaw, GA
G	21	Lefty Webster	5 ft 8 in (1.73 m)	Jr	Norfolk Christian	Norfolk, VA
F	23	Kenya Olley	6 ft 3 in (1.91 m)	Jr	Dorman	Spartanburg, SC
G	24	Grace Hunter	5 ft 9 in (1.75 m)	Fr	Athens Drive	Raleigh, NC
F	30	Jaida Robinson	6 ft 2 in (1.88 m)	Fr	Albemarle	Albemarle, NC
F	32	Alexis Alexander	6 ft 1 in (1.85 m)	Sr	Alpharetta	Atlanta, GA
F	34	Dara Pearson	6 ft 3 in (1.91 m)	Fr	Hampton	Hampton, VA

Head coach

Cara Consuegra (Iowa)

Assistant coach(es)

Joanne Aluka-White (Middle Tennessee)
Randi Henderson (Iowa)
Nicole Woods (Belmont Abbey)

Legend

- (C) Team captain
- (S) Suspended
- (I) Ineligible
- (W) Walk-on
- Injured
- Current redshirt

Roster

== Rankings ==
+ Regular season polls	Poll	Pre- Season	Week 2	Week 3	Week 4	Week 5	Week 6	Week 7	Week 8	Week 9	Week 10	Week 11	Week 12	Week 13	Week 14	Week 15	Week 16	Week 17	Week 18	Week 19	Final
AP																					
Coaches																					

Legend
	Increase in ranking
	Decrease in ranking
	No change
(RV)	Received votes

== Schedule ==
Date time, TV	Rank^{#}	Opponent^{#}	Result	Record	Site (attendance) city, state
Exhibition
11/06/2015*; 7:00 pm		Saint Leo	W 84–47		Dale F. Halton Arena (621); Charlotte, NC
Non-conference regular season
11/13/2015*; 5:30 pm		Ball State	W 72–66	1–0	Dale F. Halton Arena (5,390); Charlotte, NC
11/15/2015*; 4:00 pm		Robert Morris	W 94–73	2–0	Dale F. Halton Arena (610); Charlotte, NC
11/19/2015*; 7:00 pm		at Elon	L 83–90	2–1	Alumni Gym (423); Elon, NC
11/23/2015*; 7:00 pm		Miami (FL)	L 70–77	2–2	Dale F. Halton Arena (720); Charlotte, NC
11/28/2015*; 3:00 pm		vs. Mercer; GSU Thanksgiving Classic	W 72–62	3–2	GSU Sports Arena (608); Atlanta, GA
11/29/2015*; 3:00 pm, ESPN3		at Georgia State; GSU Thanksgiving Classic	W 83–71	4–2	GSU Sports Arena (521); Atlanta, GA
12/02/2015*; 7:00 pm		North Carolina Central	W 67–52	5–2	Dale F. Halton Arena (655); Charlotte, NC
12/06/2015*; 2:00 pm		at NC State	L 65–72	5–3	Needham HS (1,224); Raleigh, NC
12/08/2015*; 7:00 pm		College of Charleston	W 89–61	6–3	Dale F. Halton Arena (533); Charlotte, NC
12/20/2015*; 2:00 pm		at Davidson	W 99–88	7–3	John M. Belk Arena (482); Davidson, NC
12/29/2015*; 6:30 pm		at No. 23 Missouri	L 71–88	7–4	Mizzou Arena (6,154); Columbia, MO
Conference USA regular season
01/03/2016; 1:00 pm, FSN		Old Dominion	L 59–71	7–5 (0–1)	Dale F. Halton Arena (682); Charlotte, NC
01/07/2016; 12:00 pm		Southern Miss	W 80–59	8–5 (1–1)	Dale F. Halton Arena (5,437); Charlotte, NC
01/09/2016; 7:00 pm		Louisiana Tech	W 63–58	9–5 (2–1)	Dale F. Halton Arena (821); Charlotte, NC
01/14/2016; 7:30 pm		at Middle Tennessee	L 67–72	9–6 (2–2)	Murphy Center (3,698); Murfreesboro, TN
01/16/2016; 3:00 pm		at UAB	L 57–75	9–7 (2–3)	Bartow Arena (473); Birmingham, AL
01/21/2016; 6:00 pm		at Marshall	W 64–61	10–7 (3–3)	Cam Henderson Center (474); Morgantown, WV
01/23/2016; 3:00 pm		at WKU	L 66–77	10–8 (3–4)	E. A. Diddle Arena (817); Bowling Green, KY
01/28/2016; 7:00 pm		FIU	W 87–74	11–8 (4–4)	Dale F. Halton Arena (682); Charlotte, NC
01/30/2016; 7:00 pm		Florida Atlantic	W 85–79	12–8 (5–4)	Dale F. Halton Arena (1,013); Charlotte, NC
02/06/2016; 4:00 pm		at Old Dominion	L 85–94	12–9 (5–5)	Ted Constant Convocation Center (3,146); Norfolk, VA
02/11/2016; 8:00 pm		at Rice	W 69–58	13–9 (6–5)	Tudor Fieldhouse (364); Houston, TX
02/13/2016; 3:00 pm		at North Texas	W 82–70	14–9 (7–5)	The Super Pit (325); Denton, TX
02/18/2016; 7:00 pm		Marshall	W 87–77	15–9 (8–5)	Dale F. Halton Arena (909); Charlotte, NC
02/20/2016; 7:00 pm		WKU	W 81–72	16–9 (9–5)	Dale F. Halton Arena (1,423); Charlotte, NC
02/25/2016; 8:00 pm		at UTSA	W 64–54	17–9 (10–5)	Convocation Center (490); San Antonio, TX
02/27/2016; 4:05 pm		at UTEP	L 91–94 ^{2OT}	17–10 (10–6)	Don Haskins Center (4,012); El Paso, TX
03/03/2016; 7:00 pm		Rice	W 68–63	18–10 (11–6)	Dale F. Halton Arena (651); Charlotte, NC
03/05/2016; 7:00 pm		North Texas	W 72–69	19–10 (12–6)	Dale F. Halton Arena (1,143); Charlotte, NC
Conference USA Women's Tournament
03/10/2016; 2:30 pm, ASN		vs. Old Dominion; Quarterfinals	L 54–57	19–11	Bartow Arena (432); Birmingham, AL
WNIT
03/17/2016*; 7:00 pm		Wake Forest; First Round	L 69–72	19–12	Dale F. Halton Arena (497); Charlotte, NC
*Non-conference game. ^{#}Rankings from AP Poll. (#) Tournament seedings in parentheses. All times are in Eastern Time.

== See also ==
2015–16 Charlotte 49ers men's basketball team
