= 2015–16 Rice Owls women's basketball team =

Intercollegiate basketball season

2015–16 Rice Owls women's basketball
- Conference: Conference USA
- Record: 9–22 (7–11 C-USA)
- Head coach: Tina Langley (1st season)
- Assistant coaches: Josh Hutchinson; Angie Nelp; Sydney Colson
- Home arena: Tudor Fieldhouse

2015–16 Conference USA women's basketball standings
	Conf.				Overall
Team	W		L	PCT	W		L	PCT
UTEP	16	–	2	.889	29	–	5	.853
WKU	15	–	3	.833	27	–	7	.794
Middle Tennessee †	15	–	3	.833	24	–	9	.727
Charlotte	12	–	6	.667	19	–	12	.613
Old Dominion	10	–	8	.556	17	–	17	.500
Marshall	9	–	9	.500	21	–	12	.636
Louisiana Tech	9	–	9	.500	14	–	16	.467
UAB	7	–	11	.389	15	–	16	.484
Southern Miss	7	–	11	.389	14	–	16	.467
Rice	7	–	11	.389	9	–	22	.290
Florida Atlantic	6	–	12	.333	14	–	16	.467
UTSA	6	–	12	.333	10	–	19	.345
North Texas	5	–	13	.278	11	–	19	.367
FIU	2	–	16	.111	5	–	26	.161
† 2016 C-USA Tournament winner As of March 28, 2016; Rankings from AP poll

The 2015–16 Rice Owls women's basketball team represented Rice University during the 2015–16 NCAA Division I women's basketball season. The Owls, led by first-year head coach Tina Langley, played their home games at the Tudor Fieldhouse and were members of Conference USA. They finished the season 9–22, 7–11 in C-USA play to finish in a three-way tie for eighth place. They advanced to the quarterfinals of the C-USA women's tournament, where they lost to Middle Tennessee.

== Roster ==
2015–16 Rice Owls women's basketball team
Players
Coaches

Pos.	#	Name	Height	Year	Previous school	Hometown
G	3	Maya Hawkins	5 ft 6 in (1.68 m)	Jr	Lake Ridge HS	Mansfield, TX
G	5	Lauren Grigsby	5 ft 10 in (1.78 m)	Fr	Dekaney HS	Spring, TX
G	10	Wendy Knight	5 ft 9 in (1.75 m)	So	Reagan HS	San Antonio, TX
F	11	Lexie Ducat	6 ft 1 in (1.85 m)	Fr	Brock HS	Brock, TX
G	13	Jazz Taylor	5 ft 8 in (1.73 m)	Fr	Duncanville HS	Dallas, TX
G	20	Shani Rainey	5 ft 10 in (1.78 m)	So	Lovejoy HS	Fairview, TX
G	21	Gabrielle Stanton	5 ft 7 in (1.7 m)	Fr	Kingwood HS	Kingwood, TX
G/F	22	Nicole Iademarco	6 ft 1 in (1.85 m)	RS Fr	The Woodlands HS; Arizona State	The Woodlands, TX
G	24	Elena Gumbs	5 ft 5 in (1.65 m)	Sr	Cedar Ridge HS	Cibolo, TX
F	25	Courtney Brown	6 ft 2 in (1.88 m)	So	Steele HS	Austin, TX
G/F	32	Alyssa Lang	6 ft 1 in (1.85 m)	Sr	Rockwall HS	Rockwall, TX
F	33	Jasmine Goodwine	6 ft 1 in (1.85 m)	Jr	Killeen HS	Killeen, TX
F	40	Megan Palmer	6 ft 1 in (1.85 m)	Sr	Cinco Ranch HS	Katy, TX
G/F	44	Adaeze Obinnah	6 ft 1 in (1.85 m)	Jr	Grandview HS	Aurora, CO

Head coach

- Tina Langley (West Alabama)

Assistant coach(es)

- Josh Hutchinson (Messiah)
- Angie Nelp (Colorado State)
- Sydney Colson (Texas A&M)

Legend

- (C) Team captain
- (S) Suspended
- (I) Ineligible
- (W) Walk-on
- Injured
- Current redshirt

Roster

== Rankings ==
Regular season polls
Poll	Pre- season	Week 2	Week 3	Week 4	Week 5	Week 6	Week 7	Week 8	Week 9	Week 10	Week 11	Week 12	Week 13	Week 14	Week 15	Week 16	Week 17	Week 18	Week 19	Final
AP																				
Coaches																				

Legend
	Increase in ranking
	Decrease in ranking
	No change
(RV)	Received votes

== Schedule ==
Date time, TV	Rank^{#}	Opponent^{#}	Result	Record	Site (attendance) city, state
Non-conference regular season
11/13/2015*; 6:00 pm		at No. 18 Kentucky	L 39–72	0–1	Memorial Coliseum (4,907); Lexington, KY
11/18/2015*; 7:00 pm		at Texas A&M–Corpus Christi	L 55–60	0–2	Dugan Wellness Center (617); Corpus Christi, TX
11/21/2015*; 2:00 pm		No. 11 Texas	L 47–70	0–3	Tudor Fieldhouse (821); Houston, TX
11/25/2015*; 12:00 pm		at McNeese State	L 53–61	0–4	Burton Coliseum (381); Lake Charles, LA
11/28/2015*; 7:00 pm		Harvard	L 61–67	0–5	Tudor Fieldhouse (592); Houston, TX
12/02/2015*; 6:00 pm, FSSW+		at No. 4 Baylor	L 38–89	0–6	Ferrell Center (5,615); Waco, TX
12/05/2015*; 4:00 pm		Houston; Bayou Cup	L 59–62	0–7	Tudor Fieldhouse (684); Houston, TX
12/17/2015*; 6:30 pm		at Sam Houston State	W 58–46	1–7	Bernard Johnson Coliseum (719); Huntsville, TX
12/19/2015*; 9:00 pm		at Stephen F. Austin	L 45–59	1–8	William R. Johnson Coliseum (311); Nacogdoches, TX
12/21/2015*; 7:00 pm		Texas Southern	L 66–69 ^{OT}	1–9	Tudor Fieldhouse (392); Houston, TX
12/28/2015*; 7:00 pm		Loyola-Chicago	L 50–57	1–10	Tudor Fieldhouse (541); Houston, TX
Conference USA regular season
01/01/2016; 2:00 pm		UTEP	L 54–60	1–11 (0–1)	Tudor Fieldhouse (508); Houston, TX
01/03/2016; 2:00 pm		UTSA	W 49–48 ^{OT}	2–11 (1–1)	Tudor Fieldhouse (583); Houston, TX
01/10/2016; 2:00 pm, ASN		North Texas	W 100–97 ^{3OT}	3–11 (2–1)	Tudor Fieldhouse (726); Houston, TX
01/14/2016; 7:00 pm		at WKU	L 49–52	3–12 (2–2)	E. A. Diddle Arena (937); Bowling Green, KY
01/16/2016; 12:00 pm		at Marshall	L 52–81	3–13 (2–3)	Cam Henderson Center (414); Huntington, WV
01/21/2016; 7:00 pm		UAB	L 55–64	3–14 (2–4)	Tudor Fieldhouse (305); Houston, TX
01/23/2016; 2:00 pm		Middle Tennessee	L 60–61	3–15 (2–5)	Tudor Fieldhouse (549); Houston, TX
01/30/2016; 2:00 pm		at North Texas	W 79–73 ^{2OT}	4–15 (3–5)	The Super Pit (1,721); Denton, TX
02/04/2016; 6:30 pm		at Louisiana Tech	L 63–65	4–16 (3–6)	Thomas Assembly Center (1,925); Ruston, LA
02/06/2016; 4:00 pm		at Southern Miss	L 62–68	4–17 (3–7)	Reed Green Coliseum (1,522); Hattiesburg, MS
02/11/2016; 7:00 pm		Charlotte	L 58–69	4–18 (3–8)	Tudor Fieldhouse (364); Houston, TX
02/13/2016; 2:00 pm		Old Dominion	W 68–46	5–18 (4–8)	Tudor Fieldhouse (656); Houston, TX
02/18/2016; 6:00 pm		at Florida Atlantic	W 75–54	6–18 (5–8)	FAU Arena (561); Boca Raton, FL
02/20/2016; 11:00 am, FSN		at FIU	W 68–62	7–18 (6–8)	FIU Arena (485); Miami, FL
02/25/2016; 7:00 pm		Southern Miss	L 49–59	7–19 (6–9)	Tudor Fieldhouse (404); Houston, TX
02/27/2016; 2:00 pm		Louisiana Tech	W 84–77	8–19 (7–9)	Tudor Fieldhouse (739); Houston, TX
03/03/2016; 6:00 pm		at Charlotte	L 63–68	8–20 (7–10)	Dale F. Halton Arena (651); Charlotte, NC
03/05/2016; 12:00 pm		at Old Dominion	L 52–61	8–21 (7–11)	Ted Constant Convocation Center (2,066); Norfolk, VA
Conference USA Women's Tournament
03/09/2016; 5:00 pm, ASN		vs. Louisiana Tech; Second Round	W 62–57 ^{OT}	9–21	Bartow Arena; Birmingham, AL
03/10/2016; 5:00 pm, ASN		vs. Middle Tennessee; Quarterfinals	L 54–74	9–22	Bartow Arena (563); Birmingham, AL
*Non-conference game. ^{#}Rankings from AP Poll. (#) Tournament seedings in parentheses. All times are in Central Time.

== See also ==
- 2015–16 Rice Owls men's basketball team
