= 2016 Conference USA women's basketball tournament =

- Classification: Division I
- Season: 2015–16
- Teams: 14
- Site: Legacy Arena; Bartow Arena; Birmingham, Alabama
- Champions: Middle Tennessee (2nd title)
- Winning coach: Rick Insell (2nd title)
- MVP: Ty Petty (Middle Tennessee)
- Television: ASN, CBSSN

2015–16 Conference USA women's basketball standings
| | Conf. | | | | Overall |
| Team | W | | L | PCT | W | | L | PCT |
|---|---|---|---|---|---|---|---|---|
| UTEP | 16 | – | 2 | .889 | 29 | – | 5 | .853 |
| WKU | 15 | – | 3 | .833 | 27 | – | 7 | .794 |
| Middle Tennessee † | 15 | – | 3 | .833 | 24 | – | 9 | .727 |
| Charlotte | 12 | – | 6 | .667 | 19 | – | 12 | .613 |
| Old Dominion | 10 | – | 8 | .556 | 17 | – | 17 | .500 |
| Marshall | 9 | – | 9 | .500 | 21 | – | 12 | .636 |
| Louisiana Tech | 9 | – | 9 | .500 | 14 | – | 16 | .467 |
| UAB | 7 | – | 11 | .389 | 15 | – | 16 | .484 |
| Southern Miss | 7 | – | 11 | .389 | 14 | – | 16 | .467 |
| Rice | 7 | – | 11 | .389 | 9 | – | 22 | .290 |
| Florida Atlantic | 6 | – | 12 | .333 | 14 | – | 16 | .467 |
| UTSA | 6 | – | 12 | .333 | 10 | – | 19 | .345 |
| North Texas | 5 | – | 13 | .278 | 11 | – | 19 | .367 |
| FIU | 2 | – | 16 | .111 | 5 | – | 26 | .161 |
† 2016 C-USA Tournament winner As of March 28, 2016; Rankings from AP poll

The 2016 Conference USA women's basketball tournament was a postseason women's basketball tournament for Conference USA was held March 8–12 in Birmingham, Alabama. The first two rounds took place at Bartow Arena while the semifinals and championship were held at Legacy Arena. Middle Tennessee won their second C-USA title and earn an automatic trip to the NCAA women's tournament.

== Seeds ==
The top fourteen teams qualified for the tournament. Teams were seeded by record within the conference, with a tiebreaker system to seed teams with identical conference records.

| Seed | School | Conference | Overall | Tiebreaker |
|---|---|---|---|---|
| 1 | UTEP | 16–2 | 25–3 | |
| 2 | Middle Tennessee | 15–3 | 21–8 | 1–1 vs. WKU, 1–0 vs. CHA |
| 3 | WKU | 15–3 | 24–5 | 1–1 vs. MTSU, 1–1 vs. CHA |
| 4 | Charlotte | 12–6 | 18–10 | |
| 5 | Old Dominion | 10–8 | 14–16 | |
| 6 | Marshall | 9–9 | 19–10 | 1–0 vs. LT |
| 7 | Louisiana Tech | 9–9 | 14–15 | 0–1 vs. MARSHALL |
| 8 | UAB | 7–11 | 14–15 | 2–0 vs. RICE, USM |
| 9 | Southern Miss | 7–11 | 14–15 | 2–1 vs. RICE, UAB |
| 10 | Rice | 7–11 | 8–21 | 0–3 vs. USM, UAB |
| 11 | UTSA | 6–12 | 10–18 | 1–1 vs. FAU, 1–0 vs. USM |
| 12 | Florida Atlantic | 6–12 | 14–15 | 1–1 vs. UTSA, 0–1 vs. USM |
| 13 | North Texas | 5–13 | 10–18 | |
| 14 | FIU | 2–16 | 4–25 | |
‡ – C–USA regular season champions, and tournament No. 1 seed. † – Received a double–bye in the conference tournament. # – Received a single–bye in the conference tournament. Overall records include all games played in the C–USA Tournament.

== Schedule ==
| Session | Game | Time* | Matchup^{#} | Television | Attendance |
First round – Tuesday, March 8
| 1 | 1 | 11:00 am | #12 Florida Atlantic vs. #13 North Texas | ASN | 273 |
| 1 | 2 | 1:30 pm | #11 UTSA vs. #14 FIU | ASN | 272 |
Second round – Wednesday, March 9
| 2 | 3 | 11:00 am | #8 UAB vs. #9 Southern Miss | ASN | 356 |
| 2 | 4 | 1:30 pm | #5 Old Dominion vs. #13 North Texas | ASN | 311 |
| 3 | 5 | 5:00 pm | #7 Louisiana Tech vs. #10 Rice | ASN | |
| 3 | 6 | 7:30 pm | #6 Marshall vs. #14 FIU | ASN | |
Quarterfinals – Thursday, March 10
| 4 | 7 | 11:00 am | #1 UTEP vs. #8 UAB | ASN | 327 |
| 4 | 8 | 1:30 pm | #4 Charlotte vs. #5 Old Dominion | ASN | 432 |
| 5 | 9 | 5:00 pm | #3 Middle Tennessee vs. #10 Rice | ASN | 563 |
| 5 | 10 | 7:30 pm | #2 WKU vs #6 Marshall | ASN | 499 |
Semifinals – Friday, March 11
| 6 | 11 | 10:00 am | #1 UTEP vs #5 Old Dominion | CBSSN | |
| 6 | 12 | 12:30 pm | #3 Middle Tennessee vs #6 Marshall | CBSSN | |
Championship – Saturday, March 12
| 7 | 13 | 7:00 pm | #5 Old Dominion vs #3 Middle Tennessee | CBSSN | |
*Game times in CT. #-Rankings denote tournament seed

== Bracket ==
First round Tuesday, March 8 ASN
12 | Florida Atlantic | 74
13 | North Texas | 79
11 | UTSA | 56
14 | FIU | 61

Second round Wednesday, March 9 ASN
8 | UAB | 64
9 | Southern Miss | 46
5 | Old Dominion | 62
13 | North Texas | 55
7 | Louisiana Tech | 57
10 | Rice | 62^{OT}
6 | Marshall | 76
14 | FIU | 44

Quarterfinals; Thursday, March 10; ASN
1 | UTEP | 62^{OT}
8 | UAB | 59
4 | Charlotte | 54
5 | Old Dominion | 57
2 | Middle Tennessee | 74
10 | Rice | 54
3 | WKU | 63
6 | Marshall | 66

Semifinals; Friday, March 11; CBSSN
1 | UTEP | 54
5 | Old Dominion | 66
2 | Middle Tennessee | 69
6 | Marshall | 41

Championship game Saturday, March 12; CBSSN
5 | Old Dominion | 54
2 | Middle Tennessee | 70

All times listed are Central

== See also ==
2016 Conference USA men's basketball tournament
