= 2015–16 Florida Atlantic Owls women's basketball team =

Intercollegiate basketball season

2015–16 Florida Atlantic Owls women's basketball

FAU Holiday Tournament champions
- Conference: Conference USA
- Record: 14–16 (6–12 C-USA)
- Head coach: Kellie Lewis-Jay (4th season)
- Assistant coaches: Richard Henderson; Danielle Stoimenoff; Brooklyn Kohlheim
- Home arena: FAU Arena

2015–16 Conference USA women's basketball standings
	Conf.				Overall
Team	W		L	PCT	W		L	PCT
UTEP	16	–	2	.889	29	–	5	.853
WKU	15	–	3	.833	27	–	7	.794
Middle Tennessee †	15	–	3	.833	24	–	9	.727
Charlotte	12	–	6	.667	19	–	12	.613
Old Dominion	10	–	8	.556	17	–	17	.500
Marshall	9	–	9	.500	21	–	12	.636
Louisiana Tech	9	–	9	.500	14	–	16	.467
UAB	7	–	11	.389	15	–	16	.484
Southern Miss	7	–	11	.389	14	–	16	.467
Rice	7	–	11	.389	9	–	22	.290
Florida Atlantic	6	–	12	.333	14	–	16	.467
UTSA	6	–	12	.333	10	–	19	.345
North Texas	5	–	13	.278	11	–	19	.367
FIU	2	–	16	.111	5	–	26	.161
† 2016 C-USA Tournament winner As of March 28, 2016; Rankings from AP poll

The 2015–16 Florida Atlantic Owls women's basketball team represented Florida Atlantic University during the 2015–16 NCAA Division I women's basketball season. The Owls, led by fourth-year head coach Kellie Lewis-Jay, played their home games at FAU Arena in Boca Raton, Florida and were members of Conference USA (C-USA). They finished the season 14–16, 6–12 in C-USA play, to finish in a tie for 11th place. They lost in the first round of the C-USA women's tournament to North Texas.

== Roster ==
2015–16 Florida Atlantic Owls women's basketball team
Players
Coaches

Pos.	#	Name	Height	Year	Previous school	Hometown
G	0	Danneal Ford	5 ft 9 in (1.75 m)	So	Norland	Miami, FL
G	3	Ro Hayes	5 ft 7 in (1.7 m)	RS Fr	Viera HS	Rockledge, FL
F	5	Raven Doyle	6 ft 2 in (1.88 m)	RS So	Desert Christian HS	Lancaster, CA
G	10	Morgan Robinson	5 ft 9 in (1.75 m)	Sr	Lyman HS	Longwood, FL
G/F	13	Kat Wright	6 ft 0 in (1.83 m)	Jr	Notre Dame HS	Woodland Hills, CA
F	15	Sasha Cedeno	6 ft 3 in (1.91 m)	So	Klein Oak HS	Spring, TX
G	23	Ali Gorrell	5 ft 10 in (1.78 m)	RS Sr	Wyoming	Evergreen, CO
G	25	Halee Davis	5 ft 9 in (1.75 m)	RS So	Broward College	Orlando, FL
F	31	Ra'Kyra Gabriel	6 ft 2 in (1.88 m)	Fr	Brookside Christian HS	Stockton, CA
G	32	Malia Kency	5 ft 6 in (1.68 m)	So	Briarwood Academy	Statesboro, GA
G	33	Nika Zyryanova	5 ft 9 in (1.75 m)	So	Casper College	Yekaterinburg, Russia
F	50	Melinda Meyers	6 ft 2 in (1.88 m)	So	Highland HS	Gilbert, AZ

Head coach

- Kellie Lewis-Jay (Boise State)

Assistant coach(es)

- Richard Henderson (Oklahoma State)
- Danielle Maloney-Stoimenoff (Carroll (MT))
- Fitzroy Anthony (Florida Southern)

Legend

- (C) Team captain
- (S) Suspended
- (I) Ineligible
- (W) Walk-on
- Injured
- Current redshirt

Roster
Last update: October 23, 2024

== Schedule ==
Date time, TV	Rank^{#}	Opponent^{#}	Result	Record	Site (attendance) city, state
Exhibition
November 7, 2014*; 5:00 p.m.		Barry	W 79–64		FAU Arena; Boca Raton, FL
Non-conference regular season
November 13, 2015*; 7:00 p.m.		Akron	W 91–77	1–0	FAU Arena (641); Boca Raton, FL
November 17, 2015*; 7:00 p.m., ESPN3		at Florida Gulf Coast	W 62–55	2–0	Alico Arena (1,704); Fort Myers, FL
November 24, 2015*; 7:00 p.m.		Milwaukee	W 71–67	3–0	FAU Arena (525); Boca Raton, FL
November 27, 2015*; 12:00 p.m.		Delaware State; FAU Thanksgiving Tournament semifinals	W 83–55	4–0	FAU Arena; Boca Raton, FL
November 28, 2015*; 2:30 p.m.		South Dakota; FAU Thanksgiving Tournament championship	L 53–76	4–1	FAU Arena (441); Boca Raton, FL
December 6, 2015*; 2:00 p.m.		Keiser	W 74–52	5–1	FAU Arena; Boca Raton, FL
December 13, 2015*; 5:00 p.m., ESPN3		at Kansas State	L 53–102	5–2	Bramlage Coliseum (3,905); Manhattan, KS
December 19, 2015*; 5:30 p.m.		at Montana; Lady Griz Classic semifinals	L 69–83	5–3	Dahlberg Arena (2,365); Missoula, MT
December 20, 2015*; 3:00 p.m.		vs. Tennessee State; Lady Griz Classic 3rd-place game	W 69–64	6–3	Dahlberg Arena (384); Missoula, MT
December 29, 2015*; 5:00 p.m.		Bethune–Cookman; FAU Holiday Tournament semifinals	W 82–60	7–3	FAU Arena; Boca Raton, FL
December 30, 2015*; 7:15 p.m.		Miami (OH); FAU Holiday Tournament championship	W 68–65 ^{OT}	8–3	FAU Arena (526); Boca Raton, FL
Conference USA regular season
January 3, 2016; 2:00 p.m.		FIU	W 87–82	9–3 (1–0)	FAU Arena (527); Boca Raton, FL
January 7, 2016; 7:00 p.m.		Marshall	W 84–73	10–3 (2–0)	FAU Arena (483); Boca Raton, FL
January 9, 2016; 3:00 p.m.		WKU	L 62–81	10–4 (2–1)	FAU Arena (469); Boca Raton, FL
January 14, 2016; 9:00 p.m., FSN		at Southern Miss	L 80–89	10–5 (2–2)	Reed Green Coliseum (1,546); Hattiesburg, MS
January 16, 2016; 7:00 p.m.		at Louisiana Tech	L 62–65	10–6 (2–3)	Thomas Assembly Center (2,116); Ruston, LA
January 21, 2016; 7:00 p.m.		UTEP	L 66–78	10–7 (2–4)	FAU Arena (747); Boca Raton, FL
January 23, 2016; 5:00 p.m.		UTSA	W 64–51	11–7 (3–4)	FAU Arena (763); Boca Raton, FL
January 28, 2016; 7:00 p.m.		at Old Dominion	L 45–85	11–8 (3–5)	Ted Constant Convocation Center (1,718); Norfolk, VA
January 30, 2016; 7:00 p.m.		at Charlotte	L 79–85	11–9 (3–6)	Dale F. Halton Arena (1,013); Charlotte, NC
February 4, 2016; 7:00 p.m.		Middle Tennessee	L 73–83	11–10 (3–7)	FAU Arena (612); Boca Raton, FL
February 6, 2016; 5:00 p.m.		UAB	L 62–67	11–11 (3–8)	FAU Arena (532); Boca Raton, FL
February 11, 2016; 8:00 p.m.		at UTSA	L 54–57	11–12 (3–9)	Convocation Center (536); San Antonio, TX
February 13, 2016; 4:05 p.m.		at UTEP	L 47–75	11–13 (3–10)	Don Haskins Center (2,001); El Paso, TX
February 18, 2016; 7:00 p.m.		Rice	L 54–75	11–14 (3–11)	FAU Arena (561); Boca Raton, FL
February 20, 2016; 5:00 p.m.		North Texas	W 71–61	12–14 (4–11)	FAU Arena (564); Boca Raton, FL
February 27, 2016; 7:00 p.m.		at FIU	W 63–52	13–14 (5–11)	FIU Arena (418); Miami, FL
March 3, 2016; 7:30 p.m.		at Middle Tennessee	L 65–71	13–15 (5–12)	Murphy Center (4,203); Murfreesboro, TN
March 5, 2016; 2:00 p.m.		at UAB	W 52–51	14–15 (6–12)	Bartow Arena (439); Birmingham, AL
Conference USA women's tournament
March 8, 2016; 12:00 p.m., ASN		vs. North Texas; First round	L 74–79	14–16	Bartow Arena (273); Birmingham, AL
*Non-conference game. ^{#}Rankings from AP poll. (#) Tournament seedings in parentheses. All times are in Eastern.

== See also ==
- 2015–16 Florida Atlantic Owls men's basketball team
