= 2015–16 UTSA Roadrunners women's basketball team =

Intercollegiate basketball season

2015–16 UTSA Roadrunners women's basketball

UTSA Thanksgiving Classic champions
- Conference: Conference USA
- Record: 10–19 (6–12 C-USA)
- Head coach: Lubomyr Lichonczak (3rd season)
- Assistant coaches: Kristen Holt; Nicole Dunson; Ela Mukosiej
- Home arena: Convocation Center

2015–16 Conference USA women's basketball standings
	Conf.				Overall
Team	W		L	PCT	W		L	PCT
UTEP	16	–	2	.889	29	–	5	.853
WKU	15	–	3	.833	27	–	7	.794
Middle Tennessee †	15	–	3	.833	24	–	9	.727
Charlotte	12	–	6	.667	19	–	12	.613
Old Dominion	10	–	8	.556	17	–	17	.500
Marshall	9	–	9	.500	21	–	12	.636
Louisiana Tech	9	–	9	.500	14	–	16	.467
UAB	7	–	11	.389	15	–	16	.484
Southern Miss	7	–	11	.389	14	–	16	.467
Rice	7	–	11	.389	9	–	22	.290
Florida Atlantic	6	–	12	.333	14	–	16	.467
UTSA	6	–	12	.333	10	–	19	.345
North Texas	5	–	13	.278	11	–	19	.367
FIU	2	–	16	.111	5	–	26	.161
† 2016 C-USA Tournament winner As of March 28, 2016; Rankings from AP poll

The 2015–16 UTSA Roadrunners women's basketball team represented the University of Texas at San Antonio during the 2015–16 NCAA Division I women's basketball season. The Roadrunners, led by third-year head coach Lubomyr Lichonczak, played their home games at the Convocation Center in San Antonio, Texas as third-year members of Conference USA (C-USA). They finished the season 10–19, 6–12 in C-USA play, to finish in a tie for eleventh place. They lost in the first round of the C-USA women's tournament to FIU.

== Roster ==
2015–16 UTSA Roadrunners women's basketball team
Players
Coaches

Pos.	#	Name	Height	Year	Previous school	Hometown
F	1	Kasia Kiejdrowska	6 ft 0 in (1.83 m)	Jr	Mineral Area College	Grudziądz, Poland
G/F	2	Mathilde Hergott	5 ft 10 in (1.78 m)	Sr	Lycee Jean Mermoz	Jonage, France
G	3	Alexus Dukes	5 ft 6 in (1.68 m)	Fr	Harker Heights HS	Harker Heights, TX
G	4	Crystal Chidomere	5 ft 11 in (1.8 m)	So	Bush HS	Richmond, TX
G	5	Alana Heard	5 ft 6 in (1.68 m)	Jr	Hightower HS	Missouri City, TX
G	11	Sara Anastasieska	5 ft 11 in (1.8 m)	Fr	Monte Sant'Angelo Mercy	Collaroy, Australia
G/F	12	Niaga Mitchell-Cole	5 ft 10 in (1.78 m)	Sr	Roosevelt HS	San Antonio, TX
F	21	Akunna Elonu	5 ft 9 in (1.75 m)	Sr	Alief Elsik HS	Houston, TX
C	23	Dempsey Thornton	6 ft 1 in (1.85 m)	Sr	King HS	Corpus Christi, TX
F	25	Taylor Williams	6 ft 2 in (1.88 m)	Jr	Cinco Ranch HS	Katy, TX
C	30	Tesha Smith	6 ft 1 in (1.85 m)	So	Wagner HS	San Antonio, TX
G	31	Carlie Henieman	6 ft 0 in (1.83 m)	So	Brennan HS	San Antonio, TX
G	32	Dwanisha Tate	5 ft 9 in (1.75 m)	Jr	Seguin HS	Arlington, TX

Head coach

Lubomyr Lichonczak (Idaho)

Assistant coach(es)

- Kristen Holt (Ohio)
- Nicole Dunson (Texas–San Antonio)
- Ela Mukosiej (Seton Hall)

Legend

- (C) Team captain
- (S) Suspended
- (I) Ineligible
- (W) Walk-on
- Injured
- Current redshirt

Roster
Last update: January 29, 2025

== Schedule ==
Date time, TV	Rank^{#}	Opponent^{#}	Result	Record	Site (attendance) city, state
Exhibition
October 31, 2015*; 2:00 p.m.		Trinity	W 59–50		Convocation Center (433); San Antonio, TX
November 8, 2015*; 7:00 p.m.		St. Edward's	W 81–50		Convocation Center (251); San Antonio, TX
Non-conference regular season
November 14, 2015*; 7:00 p.m., LHN		at No. 12 Texas	L 53–90	0–1	Frank Erwin Center (2,596); Austin, TX
November 21, 2015*; 2:00 p.m.		at Abilene Christian	L 60–79	0–2	Moody Coliseum (1,002); Abilene, TX
November 27, 2015*; 4:00 p.m.		Illinois State; UTSA Thanksgiving Classic	W 77–51	1–2	Convocation Center (234); San Antonio, TX
November 29, 2015*; 2:00 p.m.		Houston Baptist; UTSA Thanksgiving Classic	W 79–50	2–2	Convocation Center (400); San Antonio, TX
December 3, 2015*; 7:00 p.m.		at Texas State; I-35 Rivalry	L 64–72	2–3	Strahan Coliseum (1,309); San Angelo, TX
December 13, 2015*; 2:00 p.m., FSSW		at No. 17 Oklahoma	L 41–80	2–4	Lloyd Noble Center (4,086); Norman, OK
December 15, 2015*; 7:00 p.m.		Howard Payne	W 106–65	3–4	Convocation Center (265); San Antonio, TX
December 19, 2015*; 2:00 p.m.		Texas A&M–Commerce	W 88–51	4–4	Convocation Center (250); San Antonio, TX
December 21, 2015*; 7:00 p.m.		Texas–Arlington	L 47–51	4–5	Convocation Center (353); San Antonio, TX
December 28, 2015*; 2:00 p.m.		Texas Southern; UTSA Holiday Classic	L 44–59	4–6	Convocation Center (297); San Antonio, TX
December 30, 2015*; 12:00 p.m.		Bowling Green; UTSA Holiday Classic			Convocation Center; San Antonio, TX
Conference USA regular season
January 1, 2016; 2:00 p.m.		at North Texas	L 58–68	4–7 (0–1)	The Super Pit (882); Denton, TX
January 3, 2016; 2:00 p.m.		at Rice	L 48–49 ^{OT}	4–8 (0–2)	Tudor Fieldhouse (583); Houston, TX
January 7, 2016; 7:00 p.m.		UAB	W 54–52	5–8 (1–2)	Convocation Center (307); San Antonio, TX
January 9, 2016; 2:00 p.m.		Middle Tennessee	L 63–74	5–9 (1–3)	Convocation Center (303); San Antonio, TX
January 17, 2016; 2:00 p.m.		at UTEP	L 55–62	5–10 (1–4)	Don Haskins Center (1,605); El Paso, TX
January 21, 2016; 6:00 p.m.		at FIU	W 63–52	6–10 (2–4)	FIU Arena (376); Miami, FL
January 21, 2016; 6:00 p.m.		at Florida Atlantic	L 51–64	6–11 (2–5)	FAU Arena (763); Boca Raton, FL
January 28, 2016; 7:00 p.m.		Louisiana Tech	L 72–82	6–12 (2–6)	Convocation Center (539); San Antonio, TX
January 30, 2016; 2:00 p.m.		Southern Miss	W 47–41	7–12 (3–6)	Convocation Center (554); San Antonio, TX
February 4, 2016; 7:00 p.m.		at WKU	L 65–72	7–13 (3–7)	E. A. Diddle Arena (1,076); Bowling Green, KY
February 6, 2016; 12:00 p.m.		at Marshall	L 76–80	7–14 (3–8)	Cam Henderson Center (812); Huntington, WV
February 11, 2016; 7:00 p.m.		Florida Atlantic	W 57–54	8–14 (4–8)	Convocation Center (536); San Antonio, TX
February 13, 2016; 1:00 p.m.		FIU	L 54–59	8–15 (4–9)	Convocation Center (401); San Antonio, TX
February 18, 2016; 6:30 p.m.		at Louisiana Tech	L 66–75	8–16 (4–10)	Thomas Assembly Center (1,835); Ruston, LA
February 20, 2016; 4:00 p.m.		at Southern Miss	L 53–65	8–17 (4–11)	Reed Green Coliseum (1,549); Hattiesburg, MS
February 25, 2016; 7:00 p.m.		Charlotte	L 54–64	8–18 (4–12)	Convocation Center (490); San Antonio, TX
February 27, 2016; 2:00 p.m.		Old Dominion	W 70–67	9–18 (5–12)	Convocation Center (803); San Antonio, TX
March 3, 2016; 7:00 p.m.		UTEP	W 69–64	10–18 (6–12)	Convocation Center (646); San Antonio, TX
C-USA women's tournament
March 8, 2016; 1:30 p.m., ASN	No. (11)	vs. (14) FIU; First round	L 56–61	10–19	Bartow Arena (272); Birmingham, AL
*Non-conference game. ^{#}Rankings from AP poll. (#) Tournament seedings in parentheses. All times are in Central.

== See also ==
- 2015–16 UTSA Roadrunners men's basketball team
