= 2015–16 Middle Tennessee Blue Raiders women's basketball team =

Intercollegiate basketball season

2015–16 Middle Tennessee Blue Raiders women's basketball

C-USA Tournament Champions

NCAA Women's Tournament, first round
- Conference: Conference USA
- Record: 24–9 (15–3 C-USA)
- Head coach: Rick Insell (11th season)
- Assistant coaches: Kim Brewton; Tom Hodges; Shalon Pillow
- Home arena: Murphy Center

2015–16 Conference USA women's basketball standings
	Conf.				Overall
Team	W		L	PCT	W		L	PCT
UTEP	16	–	2	.889	29	–	5	.853
WKU	15	–	3	.833	27	–	7	.794
Middle Tennessee †	15	–	3	.833	24	–	9	.727
Charlotte	12	–	6	.667	19	–	12	.613
Old Dominion	10	–	8	.556	17	–	17	.500
Marshall	9	–	9	.500	21	–	12	.636
Louisiana Tech	9	–	9	.500	14	–	16	.467
UAB	7	–	11	.389	15	–	16	.484
Southern Miss	7	–	11	.389	14	–	16	.467
Rice	7	–	11	.389	9	–	22	.290
Florida Atlantic	6	–	12	.333	14	–	16	.467
UTSA	6	–	12	.333	10	–	19	.345
North Texas	5	–	13	.278	11	–	19	.367
FIU	2	–	16	.111	5	–	26	.161
† 2016 C-USA Tournament winner As of March 28, 2016; Rankings from AP poll

The 2015–16 Middle Tennessee Blue Raiders women's basketball team represented Middle Tennessee State University during the 2015–16 NCAA Division I women's basketball season. The Blue Raiders, led by eleventh-year head coach Rick Insell, played their home games at the Murphy Center and were second year members of Conference USA. They finished the season 24–9, 15–3 in C-USA play to finish in a tie for second place. They won the Conference USA Women's Tournament and received an automatic bid to the NCAA women's basketball tournament, where they lost in the first round to Florida State.

== Roster ==
2015–16 Middle Tennessee Blue Raiders women's basketball team
Players
Coaches

Pos.	#	Name	Height	Year	Previous school	Hometown
F	00	Alex Johnson	6 ft 0 in (1.83 m)	RS Fr	Blackman HS	Murfreesboro, Tennessee
G	5	Abbey Sissom	5 ft 8 in (1.73 m)	So	Cannon County HS	Woodbury, Tennessee
G	11	Jess Louro	5 ft 10 in (1.78 m)	Fr	St. Rose HS	Wall, New Jersey
G/F	12	Brea Edwards	5 ft 10 in (1.78 m)	Sr	Central Arizona College	Rockford, Illinois
F	13	Jordan Majors	6 ft 0 in (1.83 m)	Fr	Martin Luther King HS	Nashville, Tennessee
G	14	Katie Collier	5 ft 9 in (1.75 m)	Fr	Webb School of Knoxville	Knoxville, Tennessee
G	20	Ty Petty	5 ft 7 in (1.7 m)	Jr	Riverdale HS	Murfreesboro, Tennessee
F	22	Alex Smith	6 ft 4 in (1.93 m)	Fr	Murray Bergtraum HS	Bronx, New York
F	23	Gabby Lyon	6 ft 0 in (1.83 m)	So	Science Hill HS	Johnson City, Tennessee
F	24	Rebecca Reuter	6 ft 2 in (1.88 m)	So	Bradley Central HS	Cleveland, Tennessee
F	31	TiAnna Porter	6 ft 2 in (1.88 m)	RS Sr	Pittsburgh	Paris, Tennessee
G	32	Caroline Warden	5 ft 7 in (1.7 m)	Sr	Jackson County HS	Gainesboro, Tennessee
G/F	34	Olivia Jones	5 ft 10 in (1.78 m)	Jr	Riverdale HS	Murfreesboro, Tennessee

Head coach

Rick Insell (Middle Tennessee)

Assistant coach(es)

Kim Brewton (Liberty)
Tom Hodges (Tennessee Tech)
Shalon Pillow (Tennessee)

Legend

- (C) Team captain
- (S) Suspended
- (I) Ineligible
- (W) Walk-on
- Injured
- Current redshirt

Roster

== Rankings ==
Regular season polls
Poll	Pre- Season	Week 2	Week 3	Week 4	Week 5	Week 6	Week 7	Week 8	Week 9	Week 10	Week 11	Week 12	Week 13	Week 14	Week 15	Week 16	Week 17	Week 18	Week 19	Final
AP	NR	NR	NR	NR	NR	NR	NR	NR	NR	NR	NR	NR	NR	NR	NR	NR	NR	NR	NR	N/A
Coaches	RV	NR	NR	NR	NR	NR	NR	NR	NR	NR	NR	NR	NR	NR	NR	NR	NR	NR	RV	NR

Legend
	Increase in ranking
	Decrease in ranking
	Not ranked previous week
(RV)	Received votes

== Schedule ==
Date time, TV	Rank^{#}	Opponent^{#}	Result	Record	Site (attendance) city, state
Exhibition
11/04/2015*; 6:30 pm		Coastal Georgia	W 106–41		Murphy Center (2,200); Murfreesboro, TN
11/09/2015*; 6:30 pm		Martin Methodist	W 85–53		Murphy Center (2,500); Murfreesboro, TN
Non-conference regular season
11/13/2015*; 6:30 pm, MT10		Virginia	L 66–70	0–1	Murphy Center (5,613); Murfreesboro, TN
11/19/2015*; 6:00 pm		at Central Michigan	L 59–81	0–2	McGuirk Arena (1,483); Mount Pleasant, MI
11/22/2015*; 1:00 pm, FSN		Ole Miss	W 84–75	1–2	Murphy Center (6,605); Murfreesboro, TN
11/27/2015*; 4:00 pm		vs. Alabama; Nugget Classic	L 46–64	1–3	Lawlor Events Center; Reno, NV
11/28/2015*; 6:00 pm		at Nevada; Nugget Classic	W 90–46	2–3	Lawlor Events Center (964); Reno, NV
11/30/2015*; 7:00 pm		at Austin Peay	W 86–55	3–3	Dunn Center (385); Clarksville, TN
12/06/2015*; 1:00 pm		at Xavier	W 62–53	4–3	Cintas Center (962); Cincinnati, OH
12/13/2015*; 2:00 pm		No. 8 Kentucky	L 52–68	4–4	Murphy Center (5,190); Murfreesboro, TN
12/17/2015*; 11:00 am		Missouri State	W 70–54	5–4	Murphy Center (11,411); Murfreesboro, TN
12/20/2015*; 2:00 pm		Tennessee Tech	W 69–53	6–4	Murphy Center (4,925); Murfreesboro, TN
12/29/2015*; 6:00 pm		at Ohio	L 49–72	6–5	Convocation Center (921); Athens, OH
Conference USA regular season
01/03/2016; 2:00 pm		UAB	W 68–40	7–5 (1–0)	Murphy Center (3,911); Murfreesboro, TN
01/07/2016; 8:05 pm		at UTEP	L 73–84	7–6 (1–1)	Don Haskins Center (1,255); El Paso, TX
01/09/2016; 2:00 pm		at UTSA	W 74–63	8–6 (2–1)	Convocation Center (303); San Antonio, TX
01/14/2016; 6:30 pm		Charlotte	W 72–67	9–6 (3–1)	Murphy Center (3,698); Murfreesboro, TN
01/16/2016; 6:00 pm, MT10		Old Dominion	L 58–61	9–7 (3–2)	Murphy Center (3,758); Murfreesboro, TN
01/21/2016; 7:00 pm		at North Texas	W 76–52	10–7 (4–2)	The Super Pit (746); Denton, TX
01/23/2016; 2:00 pm		at Rice	W 61–60	11–7 (5–2)	Tudor Fieldhouse (549); Houston, TX
01/28/2016; 6:00 pm		Marshall	W 65–54	12–7 (6–2)	Murphy Center (3,958); Murfreesboro, TN
01/30/2016; 5:00 pm, FSN		WKU	W 83–75	13–7 (7–2)	Murphy Center (5,125); Murfreesboro, TN
02/04/2016; 6:00 pm		at Florida Atlantic	W 83–73	14–7 (8–2)	FAU Arena (612); Boca Raton, FL
02/06/2016; 1:00 pm		at FIU	W 85–62	15–7 (9–2)	FIU Arena (324); Miami, FL
02/11/2016; 6:30 pm, MT10		Louisiana Tech	W 68–57	16–7 (10–2)	Murphy Center (3,316); Murfreesboro, TN
02/13/2016; 5:00 pm, MT10		Southern Miss	W 74–44	17–7 (11–2)	Murphy Center (5,229); Murfreesboro, TN
02/21/2016; 12:00 pm, ASN		at UAB	W 77–72 ^{OT}	18–7 (12–2)	Bartow Arena (278); Birmingham, AL
02/25/2016; 8:00 pm, FSN		at WKU	L 51–62	18–8 (12–3)	E. A. Diddle Arena (1,423); Bowling Green, KY
02/27/2016; 12:00 pm		at Marshall	W 79–73	19–8 (13–3)	Cam Henderson Center (876); Huntington, WV
03/03/2016; 6:30 pm		Florida Atlantic	W 71–65	20–8 (14–3)	Murphy Center (4,203); Murfreesboro, TN
03/05/2016; 2:00 pm		FIU	W 77–55	21–8 (15–3)	Murphy Center (3,707); Murfreesboro, TN
Conference USA Women's Tournament
03/10/2016; 5:00 pm, ASN		vs. Rice; Quarterfinals	W 74–54	22–8	Bartow Arena; Birmingham, AL
03/11/2016; 12:30 pm, CBSSN		vs. Marshall; Semifinals	W 69–41	23–8	Legacy Arena; Birmingham, AL
03/12/2016; 7:00 pm, CBSSN		vs. Old Dominion; Championship Game	W 70–54	24–8	Legacy Arena; Birmingham, AL
NCAA Women's Tournament
03/19/2016*; 12:30 pm, ESPN2	(12 D)	vs. (5 D) No. 17 Florida State; First Round	L 55–72	24–9	Reed Arena; College Station, TX
*Non-conference game. ^{#}Rankings from AP Poll. (#) Tournament seedings in parentheses. D=Dallas Region. All times are in Central Time.

== See also ==
- 2015–16 Middle Tennessee Blue Raiders men's basketball team
