= Marlin Chinn =

Biographical details
- Born: April 16, 1970 (age 56); Washington, D.C.
- Education: Hampton University

Coaching career (HC unless noted)
- 1994–1997: Abp. Carroll HS (boys' asst.)
- 1997–1998: Roosevelt HS (boys' asst.)
- 1998–2005: Mount St. Mary's (asst.)
- 2005–2009: Seton Hall (asst.)
- 2009–2015: Maryland (asst.)
- 2015–2016: FIU

Head coaching record
- Overall: 5–26

Marlin E. Chinn (born April 16, 1970) is an American college basketball coach.

== Early life and education ==
Born in Washington, D.C., Chinn graduated from Hampton University with a degree in accounting in 1992.

== Coaching career ==
Chinn began his coaching career at high schools in Washington, D.C., first as assistant boys' coach at Archbishop Carroll High School from 1994 to 1997, then Theodore Roosevelt Senior High School in the 1997–98 school year.

From 1998 to 2005, Chinn was an assistant coach at Mount St. Mary's University. He helped Mount St. Mary's win the Northeast Conference regular season titles in 1999 and 2001.

Chinn then became an assistant coach under Phyllis Mangina at Seton Hall in 2005, then at Maryland under Brenda Frese from 2009 to 2015. Following Maryland's run to the 2015 Final Four, Chinn became a head coach for the first time at FIU in 2015. FIU went 5–26 (2–16 C-USA) in Chinn's first and only season.

On March 11, 2016, FIU fired Chinn for an NCAA improper benefits rules violation, specifically a $600 loan to team captain Destini Feagin to resolve a school debt. The university suspended Chinn two weeks earlier, after Feagin accused Chinn of sexual harassment that persisted throughout the season.

== Head coaching record ==
Record table
Season	Team	Overall	Conference	Standing	Postseason
FIU Panthers (Conference USA) (2015–2016)
2015–16	FIU	5–26	2–16	14th	
FIU:		5–26	2–16		
Total:		5–26			
