= Middlesex, Virginia =

Unincorporated community in Virginia, United States

Coordinates: 37°35′04″N 75°48′35″W

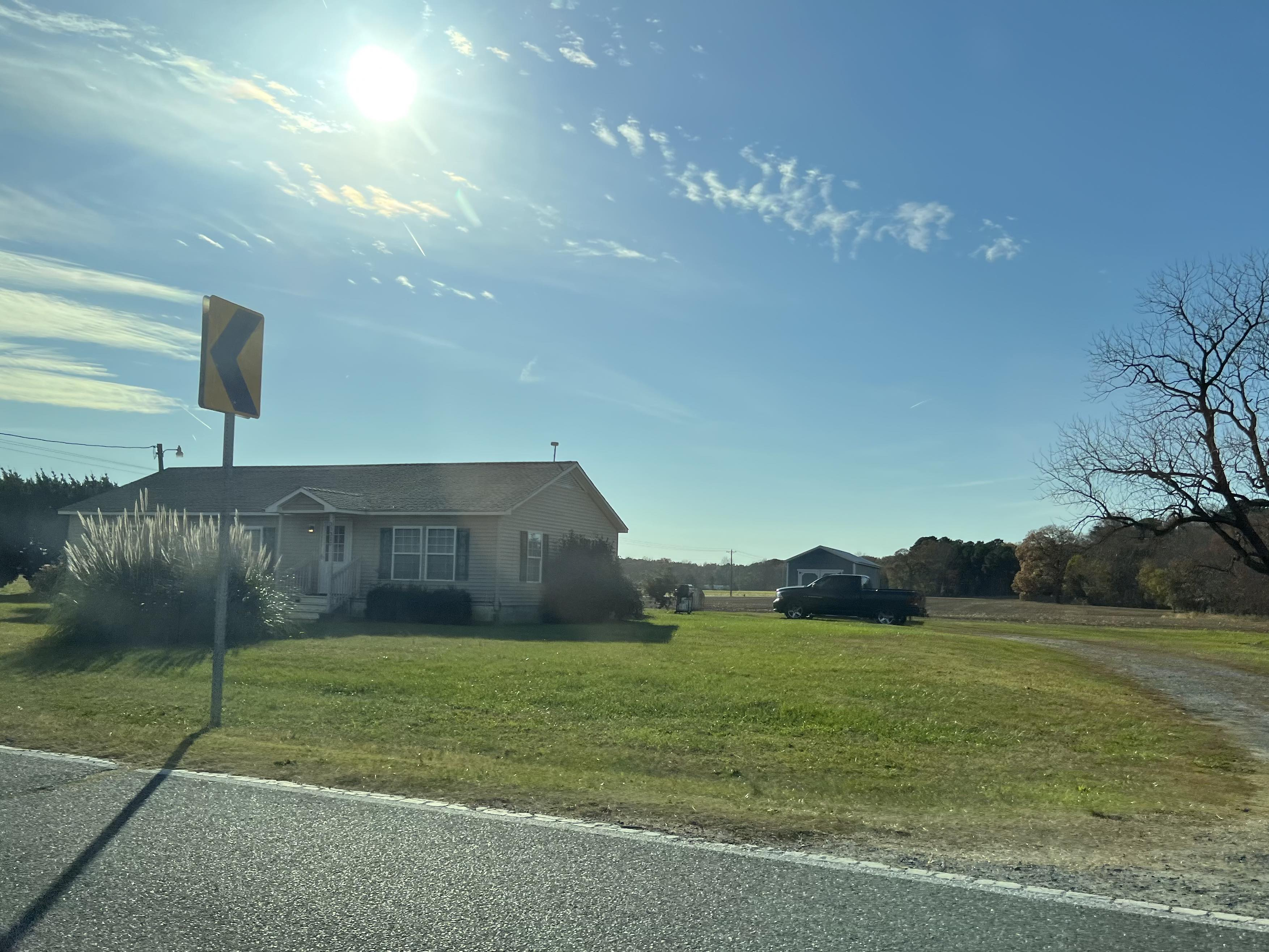
A farm in Middlesex, Virginia.

Middlesex is a coastal unincorporated community in Accomack County on the Eastern Shore of Virginia, United States.

== In popular culture ==
"Middlesex, Virginia" is the name of the main city in the film Donnie Darko, which was shot entirely in California. However, the fictional Middlesex is actually based on director Richard Kelly's hometown of Midlothian, Virginia, in Chesterfield County.
