= 2016 ASUN women's basketball tournament =

- Classification: Division I
- Season: 2015–16
- Teams: 8
- Site: campus sites
- Champions: Jacksonville (1st title)
- Winning coach: Yolett McPhee-McCuin (1st title)
- MVP: Brandi Buie (Jacksonville)
- Television: ESPN3

2015–16 Atlantic Sun women's basketball standings
| | Conf. | | | | Overall |
| Team | W | | L | PCT | W | | L | PCT |
|---|---|---|---|---|---|---|---|---|
| Florida Gulf Coast | 14 | – | 0 | 1.000 | 33 | – | 5 | .868 |
| Jacksonville † | 11 | – | 3 | .786 | 22 | – | 11 | .667 |
| USC Upstate | 10 | – | 4 | .714 | 22 | – | 12 | .647 |
| Stetson | 9 | – | 5 | .643 | 20 | – | 12 | .625 |
| Kennesaw State | 6 | – | 8 | .429 | 11 | – | 19 | .367 |
| North Florida | 3 | – | 11 | .214 | 7 | – | 23 | .233 |
| Lipscomb | 2 | – | 12 | .143 | 5 | – | 25 | .167 |
| NJIT | 1 | – | 13 | .071 | 4 | – | 26 | .133 |
† 2016 Atlantic Sun tournament winner As of April 2, 2016; Rankings from AP poll

The 2016 ASUN women's basketball tournament was the 30th edition of the ASUN Conference championship. It took place March 4, 2016, through March 13, 2016, in several arenas. All games took place at the higher of the two teams competing with the addition of NJIT. The winner received an automatic trip to the NCAA women's tournament.

== Format ==
The A-Sun Championship is a six-day single-elimination tournament. Eight teams will compete in the championship.

== Seeds ==
| Seed | School | Conference | Overall |
|---|---|---|---|
| 1 | Florida Gulf Coast | 14–0 | 26–4 |
| 2 | Jacksonville | 11–3 | 19–10 |
| 3 | USC Upstate | 10–4 | 19–10 |
| 4 | Stetson | 9–5 | 18–10 |
| 5 | Kennesaw State | 6–8 | 11–18 |
| 6 | North Florida | 3–11 | 7–22 |
| 7 | Lipscomb | 2–12 | 5–24 |
| 8 | NJIT | 1–13 | 4–25 |
Overall records are as of the end of the regular season.

== Schedule ==
| Game | Time* | Matchup^{#} | Television | Attendance |
Quarterfinals – Friday, March 4
| 1 | 7:00 PM | #8 NJIT at #1 Florida Gulf Coast | ESPN3 | 1,284 |
| 2 | 7:00 PM | #5 Kennesaw State at #4 Stetson | ESPN3 | 415 |
| 3 | 7:00 PM | #6 North Florida at #3 USC Upstate | ESPN3 | 217 |
| 4 | 7:00 PM | #7 Lipscomb at #2 Jacksonville | ESPN3 | 263 |
Semifinals – Wednesday, March 9
| 5 | 7:00 PM | #4 Stetson at #1 Florida Gulf Coast | ESPN3 | 1,505 |
| 6 | 7:00 PM | #3 USC Upstate at #2 Jacksonville | ESPN3 | 432 |
Championship – Sunday, March 13
| 7 | 2:00 PM | #2 Jacksonville at #1 Florida Gulf Coast | ESPN3 | 2,133 |
*Game times in ET. #-Rankings denote tournament seeding. All games hosted by higher-seeded team.

== Bracket ==
Quarterfinals; March 4 ESPN3
1 | Florida Gulf Coast | 60
8 | NJIT | 31
4 | Stetson | 74
5 | Kennesaw State | 56
2 | Jacksonville | 80
7 | Lipscomb | 51
3 | USC Upstate | 76
6 | North Florida | 50

Semifinals; March 9 ESPN3
1 | Florida Gulf Coast | 61
4 | Stetson | 46
2 | Jacksonville | 67
3 | USC Upstate | 56

Championship; March 13; ESPN3
1 | Florida Gulf Coast | 54
2 | Jacksonville | 56

== See also ==
- 2016 Atlantic Sun men's basketball tournament
