= Lynn Bria =

American basketball coach

Current position
- Title: Head coach

Biographical details
- Born: August 1, 1968 (age 58); Charleston, West Virginia, U.S.

Playing career
- 1985–1990: Charleston

Coaching career (HC unless noted)
- 1990–1992: Marshall (GA)
- 1992–1993: Radford (Asst.)
- 1993–1996: Texas Woman's
- 1996–1999: UCF
- 1999–2006: Ohio
- 2006–2007: West Virginia (Asst.)
- 2007–2008: Miami (Asst.)
- 2008–2026: Stetson
- 2026-present: UCF (Asst.)

Head coaching record
- Overall: 471–465 (.503)

Lynn Bria (born August 1, 1968) is an American basketball coach who was the head coach of the Stetson Hatters women's basketball team from 2008 until 2026. Prior to being named the head coach at Stetson, Bria served in head coaching roles at Ohio, UCF, and Texas Woman's University. Bria recorded her 200th win as the head coach at Stetson against Liberty on January 10, 2019. Bria recorded her 300th win as the head coach at Stetson against Morgan State on November 9, 2025. On March 16, 2026, Bria announced she was stepping away from her position at Stetson upon the conclusion of the season.

== Head coaching record ==
Record table
Season	Team	Overall	Conference	Standing	Postseason
Texas Woman's Pioneers (Lone Star Conference) (1993–1996)
1993–94	TWU	5–22	1–15	8th	
1994–95	TWU	8–18	3–11	7th	
1995–96	TWU	13–14	7–10	5th	
TWU:		26–54 (.325)	11–36 (.234)		
UCF Knights (Trans America Athletic Conference) (1996–1999)
1996–97	UCF	13–15	9–7	4th	
1997–98	UCF	17–11	11–5	2nd	
1998–99	UCF	20–10	13–3	1st	NCAA First Round
UCF:		50–36 (.581)	33–15 (.688)		
Ohio Bobcats (Mid-American Conference) (1999–2006)
1999–2000	Ohio	11–17	6–10	T–10th	
2000–01	Ohio	9–20	5–11	10th	
2001–02	Ohio	13–16	7–9	8th	
2002–03	Ohio	9–19	5–11	T–10th	
2003–04	Ohio	13–15	7–9	T–8th	
2004–05	Ohio	13–16	8–8	T–7th	
2005–06	Ohio	9–20	5–11	T–8th	
Ohio:		77–123 (.385)	43–69 (.384)		
Stetson Hatters (Atlantic Sun Conference) (2008–2026)
2008–09	Stetson	8–22	5–15	T–9th	
2009–10	Stetson	6–24	6–14	10th	
2010–11	Stetson	20–13	13–7	T–3rd	NCAA First Round
2011–12	Stetson	23–11	12–6	2nd	WNIT First Round
2012–13	Stetson	24–9	14–4	2nd	NCAA First Round
2013–14	Stetson	27–8	16–2	2nd	WNIT Second Round
2014–15	Stetson	23–8	11–3	2nd	WNIT First Round
2015–16	Stetson	20–12	9–5	4th	WBI Quarterfinals
2016–17	Stetson	26–7	13–1	1st	WNIT First Round
2017–18	Stetson	17–15	8–6	3rd	WBI First Round
2018–19	Stetson	16–16	11–5	2nd	WNIT First Round
2019–20	Stetson	12–18	6–10	T–6th	
2020–21	Stetson	10–15	7–9	5th	WBI Fourth Place
2021–22	Stetson	20–12	11–5	4th	
2022–23	Stetson	13–20	6–12	9th	
2023–24	Stetson	17–15	12–4	2nd	WNIT First Round
2024–25	Stetson	16–15	10-8	T-4th	
2025–26	Stetson	20–12	12–6	4th	WNIT First Round
Stetson:		318–252 (.558)	182–122 (.599)		
Total:		471–465 (.503)			
National champion Postseason invitational champion Conference regular season champion Conference regular season and conference tournament champion Division regular season champion Division regular season and conference tournament champion Conference tournament champion
