= 2015–16 Stetson Hatters women's basketball team =

Intercollegiate basketball season

2015–16 Stetson Hatters women's basketball
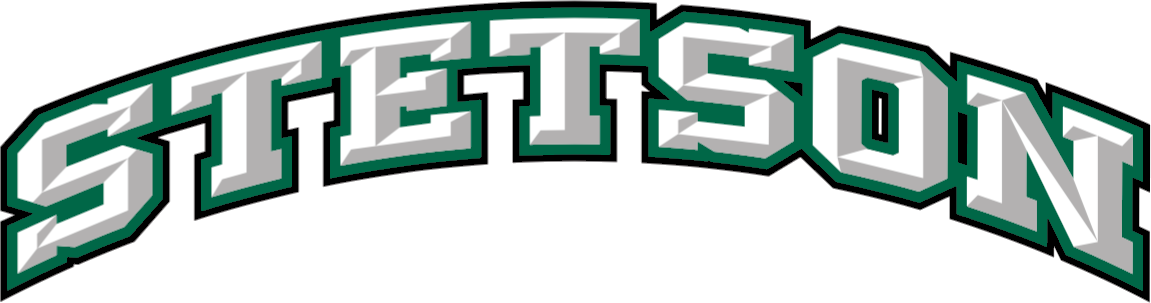

WBI, Quarterfinals
- Conference: Atlantic Sun Conference
- Record: 20–12 (9–5 A-Sun)
- Head coach: Lynn Bria (8th season)
- Assistant coaches: Roy Heintz; Daniel Barber; Brittany Young
- Home arena: Edmunds Center

2015–16 Atlantic Sun women's basketball standings
	Conf.				Overall
Team	W		L	PCT	W		L	PCT
Florida Gulf Coast	14	–	0	1.000	33	–	5	.868
Jacksonville †	11	–	3	.786	22	–	11	.667
USC Upstate	10	–	4	.714	22	–	12	.647
Stetson	9	–	5	.643	20	–	12	.625
Kennesaw State	6	–	8	.429	11	–	19	.367
North Florida	3	–	11	.214	7	–	23	.233
Lipscomb	2	–	12	.143	5	–	25	.167
NJIT	1	–	13	.071	4	–	26	.133
† 2016 Atlantic Sun tournament winner As of April 2, 2016; Rankings from AP poll

The 2015–16 Stetson Hatters women's basketball team represented Stetson University in the 2015–16 NCAA Division I women's basketball season. The Hatters were coached by eighth year head coach Lynn Bria and were members of the Atlantic Sun Conference. They finished the season 20–12, 9–5 in A-Sun play to finish in third place. They advanced to the semifinals A-Sun women's tournament, where they lost to Florida Gulf Coast. They were invited to the Women's Basketball Invitational, where they defeated McNeese State in the first round before losing to Louisiana–Lafayette in the quarterfinals.

== Media ==
All home games and conference road will be shown on ESPN3 or A-Sun.TV. Non conference road games will typically be available on the opponents website. Audio broadcasts of Hatters games can be found on WSBB AM 1230/1490 with Ryan Rouse on the call.

== Roster ==
2015–16 Stetson Hatters women's basketball team
Players
Coaches

Pos.	#	Name	Height	Year	Previous school	Hometown
F	1	Sarah Sagerer	6 ft 3 in (1.91 m)	So	The Rock School	Vöcklabruck, Austria
G	2	McKenna Beach	5 ft 6 in (1.68 m)	Fr	Cape Coral HS	Cape Coral, FL
G	3	Deja' Swinton	5 ft 8 in (1.73 m)	Fr	IMG Academy	Trinity, FL
G	4	Johanna McMillan (I) (redshirt)	5 ft 7 in (1.7 m)	Jr	Sanford School; UNC Wilmington	Mullica Hill, NJ
G	10	Brianti Saunders	5 ft 4 in (1.63 m)	Jr	Hilliard Middle-Senior	Hilliard, FL
C	12	Re'Nique Francis	6 ft 3 in (1.91 m)	Fr	Charlotte Amalie HS	St. Thomas, VI
G	15	DeAsia Beals	5 ft 9 in (1.75 m)	Jr	Holy Cross	Covington, KY
G	21	Myka Johnson-Matthews	5 ft 8 in (1.73 m)	Fr	Bishop McNamara HS	Upper Marlboro, MD
G	22	Ida Andersson	5 ft 8 in (1.73 m)	Fr	Taljegymnasiet	Södertälje, Sweden
F	23	Breana Bey	5 ft 9 in (1.75 m)	Jr	Lincoln HS; Monroe College	Jersey City, NJ
G	25	Aisha Turner	5 ft 7 in (1.7 m)	RS Jr	Westlake HS; Clemson	College Park, GA

Head coach

- Lynn Bria (Charleston (WV))

Assistant coach(es)

- Roy Heintz (South Florida)
- Daniel Barber (Florida)
- Brittany Young (Francis Marion)

Legend

- (C) Team captain
- (S) Suspended
- (I) Ineligible
- (W) Walk-on
- Injured
- Current redshirt

Roster

== Schedule ==
Date time, TV	Rank^{#}	Opponent^{#}	Result	Record	Site (attendance) city, state
Non-conference regular season
11/14/2015*; 10:15 am		Trinity Baptist	W 107–30	1–0	Edmunds Center (115); DeLand, FL
11/15/2015*; 2:00 pm		at Georgia	L 55–76	1–1	Stegeman Coliseum (3,530); Athens, GA
11/21/2015*; 3:00 pm		at Bethune-Cookman	W 62–38	2–1	Moore Gymnasium (78); Daytona Beach, FL
11/21/2015*; 5:45 pm, ESPN3		Armstrong State	W 61–45	3–1	Edmunds Center (392); DeLand, FL
11/27/2015*; 4:45 pm		vs. Minnesota; San Juan Shootout	L 69–72	3–2	Mario Morales Coliseum; Guaynabo, PR
11/28/2015*; 4:45 pm		vs. Boise State; San Juan Shootout	L 65–71	3–3	Mario Morales Coliseum; Guaynabo, PR
12/02/2015*; 5:30 pm, ESPN3		UCF	W 83–68	4–3	Edmunds Center (415); DeLand, FL
12/04/2015*; 11:00 am, ESPN3		Flagler College	W 84–47	5–3	Edmunds Center (2,451); DeLand, FL
12/13/2015*; 2:00 pm		at Eastern Illinois	W 68–66	6–3	Lantz Arena (333); Charleston, SC
12/15/2015*; 11:30 am		at UNC Wilmington	W 52–49	7–3	Trask Coliseum (4,893); Wilmington, NC
12/20/2015*; 1:00 pm, ESPN3		Georgia Southern; Hatter Classic semifinals	W 79–57	8–3	Edmunds Center (328); DeLand, FL
12/21/2015*; 1:00 pm, ESPN3		Georgia State; Hatter Classic championship	L 72–80 ^{OT}	8–4	Edmunds Center (350); DeLand, FL
12/30/2015*; 7:00 pm		at No. 13 Tennessee	L 56–90	8–5	Thompson–Boling Arena (10,705); Knoxville, TN
01/01/2016*; 2:30 pm, ESPN3		Hampton	W 68–59	9–5	Edmunds Center (266); DeLand, FL
Atlantic Sun regular season
01/09/2016; 4:00 pm, ESPN3		at Florida Gulf Coast	L 48–61	9–6 (0–1)	Alico Arena (2,842); Fort Myers, FL
01/16/2016; 1:00 pm, ESPN3		NJIT	W 60–55	10–6 (1–1)	Edmunds Center (316); DeLand, FL
01/18/2016; 7:00 pm, ESPN3		USC Upstate	L 56–61	10–7 (1–2)	Edmunds Center (353); DeLand, FL
01/23/2016; 2:00 pm, ESPN3		at Kennesaw State	W 57–54	11–7 (2–2)	KSU Convocation Center (420); Kennesaw, GA
01/25/2016; 7:30 pm, ESPN3		at Lipscomb	W 83–62	12–7 (3–2)	Allen Arena (310); Nashville, TN
01/30/2016; 1:00 pm, ESPN3		at Jacksonville	L 49–69	12–8 (3–3)	Swisher Gymnasium (367); Jacksonville, FL
02/04/2016; 7:00 pm, ESPN3		North Florida	W 81–61	13–8 (4–3)	Edmunds Center (610); DeLand, FL
02/06/2016; 1:00 pm, ESPN3		Jacksonville	W 66–61	14–8 (5–3)	Edmunds Center (856); DeLand, FL
02/10/2016; 7:00 pm, ESPN3		at North Florida	W 67–56	15–8 (6–3)	UNF Arena (374); Jacksonville, FL
02/13/2016; 4:30 pm, ESPN3		at USC Upstate	L 58–73	15–9 (6–4)	G. B. Hodge Center (142); Spartanburg, SC
02/15/2016; 7:00 pm, ESPN3		at NJIT	W 74–56	16–9 (7–4)	Fleisher Center (400); Newark, NJ
02/20/2016; 7:00 pm, ESPN3		Lipscomb	W 79–75	17–9 (8–4)	Edmunds Center (310); DeLand, FL
02/22/2016; 2:00 pm, ESPN3		Kennesaw State	W 77–62	18–9 (9–4)	Edmunds Center (878); DeLand, FL
02/27/2016; 2:00 pm, ESPN3		Florida Gulf Coast	L 46–60	18–10 (9–5)	Edmunds Center (590); DeLand, FL
Atlantic Sun Tournament
03/04/2016; 7:00 pm, ESPN3		Kennesaw State; Quarterfinals	W 74–56	19–10	Edmunds Center (415); DeLand, FL
03/09/2016; 7:00 pm, ESPN3		at Florida Gulf Coast; Semifinals	L 46–61	19–11	Alico Arena (1,505); Fort Myers, FL
WBI
03/17/2016*; 7:00 pm		McNeese State; First Round	W 89–54	20–11	Edmunds Center (209); DeLand, FL
03/19/2016*; 8:00 pm		at Louisiana–Lafayette; Quarterfinals	L 47–56	20–12	Earl K. Long Gymnasium (312); Lafayette, LA
*Non-conference game. ^{#}Rankings from AP Poll. (#) Tournament seedings in parentheses. All times are in Eastern Time.

== See also ==
- 2015–16 Stetson Hatters men's basketball team
