= 2016 Sun Belt Conference women's basketball tournament =

- Classification: Division I
- Season: 2015–16
- Teams: 8
- Site: Lakefront Arena; New Orleans, Louisiana
- Champions: Troy (1st title)
- Winning coach: Chanda Rigby (1st title)
- MVP: Ashley Beverly Kelley (Troy)
- Television: Sun Belt Network, ESPN3

2015–16 Sun Belt Conference women's basketball standings
	Conf.				Overall
Team	W		L	PCT	W		L	PCT
Arkansas State	19	–	1	.950	26	–	5	.839
Little Rock	16	–	4	.800	20	–	12	.625
Louisiana–Lafayette	13	–	7	.650	21	–	10	.677
Troy †	12	–	8	.600	20	–	13	.606
South Alabama	11	–	9	.550	15	–	15	.500
UT Arlington	10	–	10	.500	15	–	16	.484
Texas State	7	–	13	.350	12	–	19	.387
Appalachian State	7	–	13	.350	10	–	20	.333
Louisiana–Monroe	6	–	14	.300	12	–	17	.414
Georgia State	5	–	15	.250	10	–	19	.345
Georgia Southern	4	–	16	.200	7	–	22	.241
† 2016 Sun Belt Tournament winner As of March 26, 2015; Rankings from AP poll

The 2016 Sun Belt Conference women's basketball tournament was the postseason women's basketball tournament for the Sun Belt Conference beginning on March 9, 2016, and ending on March 12, 2016, in New Orleans, Louisiana at the Lakefront Arena. Troy upset Arkansas 61–60 in the championship game.

== Seeds ==
2016 Sun Belt women's basketball tournament seeds and results
Seed	School	Conf.	Over.	Tiebreaker
1	‡Arkansas State	19–1	24–3	
2	Little Rock	16–4	18–10	
3	Louisiana–Lafayette	13–7	17–9	
4	Troy	12–8	18–11	
5	South Alabama	11–9	15–14	
6	Texas–Arlington	10–10	15–15	
7	Texas State	7–13	12–18	1–1 vs. Appalachian State
8	Appalachian State	7–13	10–19	1–1 vs. Texas State
‡ – Sun Belt Conference regular season champions.

== Schedule ==
Game	Time*	Matchup^{#}	Score	Television
Quarterfinals – Wednesday, March 9
1	11:30 am	#1 Arkansas State vs. #8 Appalachian State	81–61	
2	2:00 pm	#4 Troy vs. #5 South Alabama	62–49	
3	5:00 pm	#2 Little Rock vs. #7 Texas State	62–50	
4	7:30 pm	#3 Louisiana–Lafayette vs. #6 UT Arlington	59–53	
Semifinals – Friday, March 11
5	11:30 am	#1 Arkansas State vs. #4 Troy	89–96	Sun Belt Network
6	2:00 pm	#2 Little Rock vs. #3 Louisiana–Lafayette	63–52	Sun Belt Network
Championship Game – Saturday, March 12
7	7:00 pm	#4 Troy vs. #2 Little Rock	61–60	ESPN3
*Game Times in CT. # – Rankings denote tournament seed

== Bracket ==
Quarterfinals; Wednesday, March 9
1	Arkansas State	81
8	Appalachian State	61
4	Troy	62
5	South Alabama	49
2	Little Rock	62
7	Texas State	50
3	Louisiana–Lafayette	59
6	UT Arlington	53

Semifinals; Friday, March 11
1	Arkansas State	89
4	Troy	96
2	Louisiana–Lafayette	52
3	Little Rock	63

Championship; Saturday, March 12
4	Troy	61
2	Little Rock	60

== See also ==
2016 Sun Belt Conference men's basketball tournament
