= 2015–16 Little Rock Trojans women's basketball team =

Intercollegiate basketball season

2015–16 Little Rock Trojans women's basketball
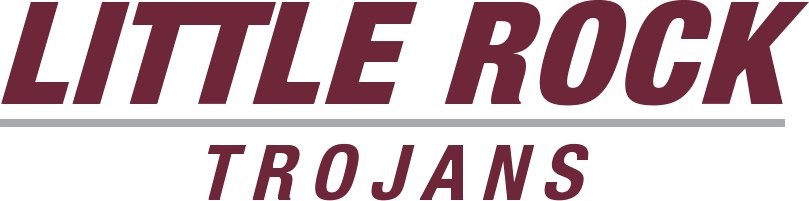

WNIT, First Round
- Conference: Sun Belt Conference
- Record: 20–13 (16–4 Sun Belt)
- Head coach: Joe Foley (13th season)
- Assistant coaches: Robert Dallimore; Alicia Cash; Steve Wiedower
- Home arena: Jack Stephens Center

2015–16 Sun Belt Conference women's basketball standings
	Conf.				Overall
Team	W		L	PCT	W		L	PCT
Arkansas State	19	–	1	.950	26	–	5	.839
Little Rock	16	–	4	.800	20	–	12	.625
Louisiana–Lafayette	13	–	7	.650	21	–	10	.677
Troy †	12	–	8	.600	20	–	13	.606
South Alabama	11	–	9	.550	15	–	15	.500
UT Arlington	10	–	10	.500	15	–	16	.484
Texas State	7	–	13	.350	12	–	19	.387
Appalachian State	7	–	13	.350	10	–	20	.333
Louisiana–Monroe	6	–	14	.300	12	–	17	.414
Georgia State	5	–	15	.250	10	–	19	.345
Georgia Southern	4	–	16	.200	7	–	22	.241
† 2016 Sun Belt tournament winner

The 2015–16 Little Rock Trojans women's basketball team represented the University of Arkansas at Little Rock during the 2015–16 NCAA Division I women's basketball season. The Trojans, led by thirteenth year head coach Joe Foley, played their home games at the Jack Stephens Center and were members of the Sun Belt Conference. They finished the season 20–13, 16–4 in Sun Belt play to finish in 2nd place. They advanced to the championship game of the Sun Belt women's tournament where they lost to Troy. They were invited to the Women's National Invitation Tournament where they lost in the first round to Saint Louis.

== Roster ==
2015–16 Little Rock Trojans women's basketball team
Players	Coaches
Pos. / # / Name / Height / Year / Previous school / Hometown	Head coach: Joe Foley (Central Arkansas); Assistant coach(es): Robert Dallimore (LSU); Alicia Cash (Little Rock); Steve Wiedower (Arkansas State); Legend: (C) Team captain; (S) Suspended; (I) Ineligible; (W) Walk-on; Injured; Current redshirt; Roster

== Schedule ==
Date time, TV	Rank^{#}	Opponent^{#}	Result	Record	Site (attendance) city, state
Non-conference regular season
11/13/2015*; 5:30 pm		at Tulane	L 53–69	0–1	Devlin Fieldhouse (357); New Orleans, LA
11/18/2015*; 7:15 pm, CST		LSU	L 51–57	0–2	Jack Stephens Center (2,275); Little Rock, AR
11/24/2015*; 7:00 pm		at Oral Roberts	W 66–52	1–2	Reynolds Center (733); Tulsa, OK
11/27/2015*; 5:15 pm		Memphis	W 61–53	2–2	Jack Stephens Center (972); Little Rock, AR
12/02/2015*; 7:00 pm, FSOK+		at No. 21 Oklahoma	L 52–65	2–3	Lloyd Noble Center (3,747); Norman, OK
12/06/2015*; 2:00 pm		No. 6 Texas	L 56–66	2–4	Jack Stephens Center (1,642); Little Rock, AR
12/13/2015*; 2:00 pm		Tulsa	L 63–74	2–5	Jack Stephens Center (1,770); Little Rock, AR
12/20/2015*; 3:00 pm, ESPN3		Missouri State	L 58–64	2–6	Jack Stephens Center (3,130); Little Rock, AR
12/22/2015*; 12:00 pm, SECN		at No. 16 Texas A&M	L 39–69	2–7	Reed Arena (3,852); College Station, TX
Sun Belt Conference regular season
12/30/2015; 5:00 pm, ESPN3		at South Alabama	W 47–34	3–7 (1–0)	Mitchell Center (2,314); Mobile, AL
01/02/2016; 1:00 pm		at Troy	L 71–78	3–8 (1–1)	Trojan Arena (677); Troy, AL
01/07/2016; 5:15 pm		Louisiana–Lafayette	L 58–65	3–9 (1–2)	Jack Stephens Center (3,218); Little Rock, AR
01/09/2016; 4:00 pm		Louisiana–Monroe	W 56–44	4–9 (2–2)	Jack Stephens Center; Little Rock, AR
01/14/2016; 5:15 pm		Appalachian State	W 67–50	5–9 (3–2)	Jack Stephens Center (3,543); Little Rock, AR
01/18/2016; 5:00 pm, ESPN3		at Arkansas State	L 53–66	5–10 (3–3)	Convocation Center; Jonesboro, AR
01/21/2016; 5:30 pm		at Texas State	L 57–67	5–11 (3–4)	Strahan Coliseum; San Marcos, TX
01/23/2016; 5:00 pm		at UT Arlington	W 59–55	6–11 (4–4)	College Park Center (5,033); Arlington, TX
01/28/2016; 5:15 pm		Georgia Southern	W 69–36	7–11 (5–4)	Jack Stephens Center (3,078); Little Rock, AR
01/30/2016; 4:00 pm, ESPN3		Georgia State	W 59–32	8–11 (6–4)	Jack Stephens Center (4,618); Little Rock, AR
02/04/2016; 5:00 pm		Troy	W 79–64	9–11 (7–4)	Jack Stephens Center (3,385); Little Rock, AR
02/06/2016; 4:00 pm		South Alabama	W 74–43	10–11 (8–4)	Jack Stephens Center (3,959); Little Rock, AR
02/11/2016; 5:15 pm		at Louisiana–Monroe	W 53–37	11–11 (9–4)	Fant–Ewing Coliseum; Monroe, LA
02/13/2016; 2:00 pm, ESPN3		at Louisiana–Lafayette	W 58–49	12–11 (10–4)	Cajundome (1,132); Lafayette, LA
02/18/2016; 4:00 pm, ESPN3		at Georgia State	W 54–39	13–11 (11–4)	GSU Sports Arena (378); Atlanta, GA
02/20/2016; 4:30 pm		at Georgia Southern	W 50–45	14–11 (12–4)	Hanner Fieldhouse (438); Statesboro, GA
02/25/2016; 5:15 pm		UT Arlington	W 49–43	15–11 (13–4)	Jack Stephens Center (5,253); Little Rock, AR
02/27/2016; 4:00 pm		Texas State	W 57–45	16–11 (14–4)	Jack Stephens Center; Little Rock, AR
03/01/2016; 5:15 pm		Arkansas State	W 71–69	17–11 (15–4)	Jack Stephens Center; Little Rock, AR
03/03/2016; 4:00 pm		at Appalachian State	W 72–67	18–11 (16–4)	Holmes Center (424); Boone, NC
Sun Belt Women's Tournament
03/09/2016; 5:00 pm	(2)	(7) Texas State; Quarterfinals	W 62–50	19–11	Lakefront Arena; New Orleans, LA
03/11/2016; 2:00 pm, ESPN3	(2)	(3) Louisiana–Lafayette; Semifinals	W 63–52	20–11	Lakefront Arena; New Orleans, LA
03/12/2016; 7:00 pm, ESPN3	(2)	(4) Troy; Championship Game	L 60–61	20–12	Lakefront Arena (908); New Orleans, LA
WNIT
03/17/2016*; 7:00 pm		at Saint Louis; First Round	L 69–70	20–13	Chaifetz Arena (1,051); St. Louis, MO
*Non-conference game. ^{#}Rankings from AP Poll. (#) Tournament seedings in parentheses. All times are in Central Time.

== See also ==
- 2015–16 Little Rock Trojans men's basketball team
