= 2015–16 Georgia State Panthers women's basketball team =

Intercollegiate basketball season

2015–16 Georgia State Panthers women's basketball
- Conference: Sun Belt Conference
- Record: 10–19 (5–15 Sun Belt)
- Head coach: Sharon Baldwin-Tener (6th season)
- Assistant coaches: Erin Batth; Cameron Sealey; Latricia Trammell
- Home arena: GSU Sports Arena

2015–16 Sun Belt Conference women's basketball standings
	Conf.				Overall
Team	W		L	PCT	W		L	PCT
Arkansas State	19	–	1	.950	26	–	5	.839
Little Rock	16	–	4	.800	20	–	12	.625
Louisiana–Lafayette	13	–	7	.650	21	–	10	.677
Troy †	12	–	8	.600	20	–	13	.606
South Alabama	11	–	9	.550	15	–	15	.500
UT Arlington	10	–	10	.500	15	–	16	.484
Texas State	7	–	13	.350	12	–	19	.387
Appalachian State	7	–	13	.350	10	–	20	.333
Louisiana–Monroe	6	–	14	.300	12	–	17	.414
Georgia State	5	–	15	.250	10	–	19	.345
Georgia Southern	4	–	16	.200	7	–	22	.241
† 2016 Sun Belt tournament winner

The 2015–16 Georgia State Panthers women's basketball team represented Georgia State University in the 2015–16 NCAA Division I women's basketball season. The Panthers, coached by Sharon Baldwin-Tener, were a member of the Sun Belt Conference, and played their home games on campus at the GSU Sports Arena.

== Roster ==
2015–16 Georgia State Panthers women's basketball team
Players
Coaches

Pos.	#	Name	Height	Year	Previous school	Hometown
F	0	Alaysia Mitchell	6 ft 0 in (1.83 m)	Jr	Wheeler; Pensacola State	Marietta, GA
G	1	Kierra Henry	5 ft 9 in (1.75 m)	Fr	Pope	Marietta, GA
F	2	K.K. Williams	5 ft 10 in (1.78 m)	RS Fr	Blackman	Murfreesboro, TN
F	11	Astaja Tyghter	5 ft 10 in (1.78 m)	Fr	Colonial	Orlando, FL
G	12	Ashlee Cole	5 ft 8 in (1.73 m)	Sr	Forest Park	Ellenwood, GA
G	23	Madison Newby	5 ft 8 in (1.73 m)	Fr	Archer	Lawrenceville, GA
G	24	Makeba Ponder	5 ft 8 in (1.73 m)	So	Colquitt County	Moultrie, GA
F	25	Kennesha Nichols	6 ft 0 in (1.83 m)	So	Ensworth	Smyrna, TN
F/C	32	Haley Gerrin	6 ft 2 in (1.88 m)	Jr	Habersham Central	Clarkesville, GA
G	33	Tattiana Jackson	5 ft 10 in (1.78 m)	RS Jr	Lovett; Chattanooga	Atlanta, GA
C	44	Taleah Williams	6 ft 2 in (1.88 m)	Jr	Suitland	Forestville, MD

Head coach

- Sharon Baldwin-Tener (Georgia)

Assistant coach(es)

- Erin Batth (Clemson)
- Cameron Sealey (Lenoir–Rhyne)
- Latricia Trammell (East Central)

Legend

- (C) Team captain
- (S) Suspended
- (I) Ineligible
- (W) Walk-on
- Injured
- Current redshirt

Roster
Last update: 2016-5-10

== Schedule ==
Date time, TV	Rank^{#}	Opponent^{#}	Result	Record	Site (attendance) city, state
Non-conference regular season
November 13*; 7:00 pm, ESPN3		at Kennesaw State	W 66–62	1-0	KSU Convocation Center (704); Kennesaw, GA
November 19*; 7:00 pm		at Tennessee Tech	L 65–72	1–1	Eblen Center (498); Cookeville, TN
November 21*; 7:00 pm, ESPN3		Morehead State	L 90–99	1–2	GSU Sports Arena (490); Atlanta, GA
November 24*; 7:00 pm		at Alabama	L 56–72	1–3	Foster Auditorium (2,261); Tuscaloosa, AL
November 28*; 1:00 pm, ESPN3		Howard; GSU Thanksgiving Classic	W 65–58	2–3	GSU Sports Arena (495); Atlanta, GA
November 29*; 3:00 pm, ESPN3		Charlotte; GSU Thanksgiving Classic	L 71–83	2–4	GSU Sports Arena (521); Atlanta, GA
December 5*; 2:00 pm, ESPN3		North Florida	W 76–63	3–4	GSU Sports Arena (408); Atlanta, GA
December 20*; 3:15 pm		vs. Bethune-Cookman; Stetson Hatter Classic	W 68–61	4–4	Edmunds Center (328); DeLand, FL
December 21*; 1:00 pm, ESPN3		at Stetson; Stetson Hatter Classic	W 80–72 ^{OT}	5–4	Edmunds Center (350); DeLand, FL
Sun Belt regular season
December 30; 6:00 pm		at Texas–Arlington	W 68–63	6–4 (1-0)	College Park Center (3,002); Arlington, TX
January 2; 3:00 pm		at Texas State	L 71-80	6–5 (1–1)	Strahan Coliseum (1,808); San Marcos, TX
January 7; 5:00 pm, ESPN3		Troy	L 90–97	6–6 (1–2)	GSU Sports Arena (401); Atlanta, GA
January 9; 12:00 pm, ESPN3		South Alabama	L 52–60	6–7 (1–3)	GSU Sports Arena (416); Atlanta, GA
January 14; 5:00 pm, ESPN3		Louisiana–Monroe	W 65–52	7–7 (2–3)	GSU Sports Arena (353); Atlanta, GA
January 16; 12:00 pm, ESPN3		Louisiana–Lafayette	L 57–77	7–8 (2–4)	GSU Sports Arena (454); Atlanta, GA
January 19; 5:00 pm, ESPN3		Georgia Southern	L 50–61	7–9 (2–5)	GSU Sports Arena (558); Atlanta, GA
January 21; 5:00 pm, ESPN3		at Appalachian State	W 80–75	8–9 (3–5)	Holmes Center (231); Boone, NC
January 28; 6:00 pm, ESPN3		at Arkansas State	L 54–75	8–10 (3–6)	Convocation Center (1,719); Jonesboro, AR
January 30; 5:00 pm, ESPN3		at Arkansas–Little Rock	L 32–59	8–11 (3–7)	Jack Stephens Center (4,618); Little Rock, AR
February 4; 5:00 pm, ESPN3		Texas State	W 73–62	9–11 (4–7)	GSU Sports Arena (416); Atlanta, GA
February 6; 12:00 pm, ESPN3		Texas–Arlington	L 45–74	9–12 (4–8)	GSU Sports Arena (461); Atlanta, GA
February 11; 6:00 pm		at South Alabama	L 45–83	9–13 (4–9)	Mitchell Center (1,956); Mobile, AL
February 13; 3:00 pm		at Troy	L 78–89	9–14 (4–10)	Trojan Arena (787); Troy, AL
February 18; 5:00 pm, ESPN3		Arkansas–Little Rock	L 39–54	9–15 (4–11)	GSU Sports Arena (378); Atlanta, GA
February 20; 12:00 pm, ESPN3		Arkansas State	L 64–85	9–16 (4–12)	GSU Sports Arena (457); Atlanta, GA
February 22; 7:00 pm		at Georgia Southern	W 61–60	10–16 (5–12)	Hanner Fieldhouse (529); Statesboro, GA
February 27; 12:00 pm, ESPN3		Appalachian State	L 69–72	10–17 (5–13)	GSU Sports Arena (465); Atlanta, GA
March 3; 6:00 pm		at Louisiana–Lafayette	L 60–65	10–18 (5–14)	Cajundome (869); Lafayette, LA
March 5; 1:00 pm, ESPN3		at Louisiana–Monroe	L 68–82	10–19 (5–15)	Fant–Ewing Coliseum; Monroe, LA
*Non-conference game. ^{#}Rankings from AP Poll. (#) Tournament seedings in parentheses. All times are in Eastern Time.
