= 2015–16 South Alabama Jaguars women's basketball team =

Intercollegiate basketball season

2015–16 South Alabama Jaguars women's basketball
- Conference: Sun Belt Conference
- Record: 15–15 (11–9 Sun Belt)
- Head coach: Terry Fowler (3rd season)
- Assistant coaches: Yolisha Jackson; Dan Presel; Mallory Luckett
- Home arena: Mitchell Center

2015–16 Sun Belt Conference women's basketball standings
	Conf.				Overall
Team	W		L	PCT	W		L	PCT
Arkansas State	19	–	1	.950	26	–	5	.839
Little Rock	16	–	4	.800	20	–	12	.625
Louisiana–Lafayette	13	–	7	.650	21	–	10	.677
Troy †	12	–	8	.600	20	–	13	.606
South Alabama	11	–	9	.550	15	–	15	.500
UT Arlington	10	–	10	.500	15	–	16	.484
Texas State	7	–	13	.350	12	–	19	.387
Appalachian State	7	–	13	.350	10	–	20	.333
Louisiana–Monroe	6	–	14	.300	12	–	17	.414
Georgia State	5	–	15	.250	10	–	19	.345
Georgia Southern	4	–	16	.200	7	–	22	.241
† 2016 Sun Belt tournament winner

The 2015–16 South Alabama Jaguars women's basketball team represented the University of South Alabama during the 2015–16 NCAA Division I women's basketball season. The Jaguars, led by third year head coach Terry Fowler, played their home games at the Mitchell Center as members of the Sun Belt Conference. They finished the season 15–15, 11–9 in Sun Belt play to finish in fifth place. They advanced to the quarterfinals of the Sun Belt women's tournament where they lost to Troy.

== Roster ==
2015–16 South Alabama Jaguars women's basketball team
Players
Coaches

Pos.	#	Name	Height	Year	Previous school	Hometown
G	0	Candice Williams	5 ft 6 in (1.68 m)	RS Fr	St. Francis HS; James Madison	Alpharetta, GA
G	1	D'Andra Pringle	5 ft 10 in (1.78 m)	Fr	Mountain View HS	Lawrenceville, GA
G	3	Colby Davis	5 ft 9 in (1.75 m)	Jr	Wylie HS	Wylie, TX
G	4	Christen Carter	5 ft 10 in (1.78 m)	Fr	Bolles School	Jacksonville, FL
G	5	Jennifer Towne	5 ft 7 in (1.7 m)	Sr	Nettleton HS; North Alabama	Jonesboro, AR
G	10	Marquita Daniels	5 ft 7 in (1.7 m)	So	Southwest Atlanta Christian Academy	Atlanta, GA
F	15	LaNeetra Guillory	6 ft 1 in (1.85 m)	So	Pearland HS	Pearland, TX
G	21	Juliann Miller	5 ft 8 in (1.73 m)	RS Sr	Mercy Academy; Evansville	Louisville, KY
F	22	Taylor Jenkins	6 ft 0 in (1.83 m)	Sr	Bullis School	Germantown, MD
G	23	Alyese Givens	5 ft 6 in (1.68 m)	Fr	Shades Valley HS	Irondale, AL
F	24	Erin Autio	6 ft 0 in (1.83 m)	RS Fr	St. Michael-Albertville HS	St. Michael, MN
G	30	Genesis Perrymond	5 ft 8 in (1.73 m)	RS Fr	Parkview HS	Lilburn, GA
C	34	Chyna Ellis	6 ft 2 in (1.88 m)	So	Arlington HS	Cordova, TN
F/C	44	India Hall	6 ft 2 in (1.88 m)	Fr	Brentwood Academy	Antioch, TN

Head coach

- Terry Fowler (Lane College)

Assistant coach(es)

- Yolisha Jackson (Jacksonville)
- Dan Presel (Spring Hill)
- Mallory Luckett (Murray State)

Legend

- (C) Team captain
- (S) Suspended
- (I) Ineligible
- (W) Walk-on
- Injured
- Current redshirt

Roster

== Schedule ==
Date time, TV	Rank^{#}	Opponent^{#}	Result	Record	Site (attendance) city, state
Exhibition
11/06/2015*; 7:00 pm		Montevallo	W 69–48		Mitchell Center (1,057); Mobile, AL
Non-conference regular season
11/17/2015*; 7:00 pm		Spring Hill	W 64–49	1–0	Mitchell Center (607); Mobile, AL
11/20/2015*; 5:30 pm		at Southern	L 45–50	1–1	F. G. Clark Center (282); Baton Rouge, LA
11/24/2015*; 7:00 pm		UCF	L 36–77	1–2	Mitchell Center (347); Mobile, AL
12/01/2015*; 7:00 pm		Florida	L 60–72	1–3	Mitchell Center (804); Mobile, AL
12/03/2015*; 7:00 pm		at Alabama State	W 47–43	2–3	Dunn–Oliver Acadome (1,236); Montgomery, AL
12/06/2015*; 2:00 pm		at Southern Miss	L 51–71	2–4	Reed Green Coliseum (1,294); Hattiesburg, MS
12/13/2015*; 2:00 pm		UAB	L 39–53	2–5	Mitchell Center (419); Mobile, AL
12/15/2015*; 7:00 pm		William Carey	W 66–30	3–5	Mitchell Center (219); Mobile, AL
12/19/2015*; 7:00 pm		at Grand Canyon	W 59–56	4–5	GCU Arena (462); Phoenix, AZ
Sun Belt regular season
12/30/2015; 5:00 pm, ESPN3		Little Rock	L 34–47	4–6 (0–1)	Mitchell Center (2,314); Mobile, AL
01/02/2016; 2:00 pm		Arkansas State	L 53–66	4–7 (0–2)	Mitchell Center (1,808); Mobile, AL
01/07/2016; 5:00 pm		at Georgia Southern	L 43–57	4–8 (0–3)	Hanner Fieldhouse (420); Statesboro, GA
01/09/2016; 11:00 am, ESPN3		at Georgia State	W 60–52	5–8 (1–3)	GSU Sports Arena (416); Atlanta, GA
01/14/2016; 11:00 am		Texas State	L 71–73	5–9 (1–4)	Mitchell Center (2,861); Mobile, AL
01/16/2016; 2:00 pm		Texas–Arlington	W 59–55	6–9 (2–4)	Mitchell Center (2,102); Mobile, AL
01/21/2016; 5:00 pm		at Louisiana–Lafayette	L 50–69	6–10 (2–5)	Cajundome (778); Lafayette, LA
01/23/2016; 2:00 pm		at Louisiana–Monroe	W 63–57	7–10 (3–5)	Fant–Ewing Coliseum (1,556); Monroe, LA
01/26/2016; 5:15 pm		at Troy	W 75–71	8–10 (4–5)	Trojan Arena (834); Troy, AL
01/30/2016; 5:00 pm		Appalachian State	W 71–55	9–10 (5–5)	Mitchell Center (2,231); Mobile, AL
02/04/2016; 5:00 pm		at Arkansas State	L 51–58	9–11 (5–6)	Convocation Center (1,526); Jonesboro, AR
02/06/2016; 4:00 pm		at Little Rock	L 43–74	9–12 (5–7)	Jack Stephens Center (3,959); Little Rock, AR
02/11/2016; 5:00 pm		Georgia State	W 83–45	10–12 (6–7)	Mitchell Center (1,956); Mobile, AL
02/13/2016; 2:00 pm		Georgia Southern	W 48–45	11–12 (7–7)	Mitchell Center (2,296); Mobile, AL
02/16/2016; 5:00 pm		Troy	W 65–63	12–12 (8–7)	Mitchell Center (3,027); Mobile, AL
02/18/2016; 5:00 pm		at Appalachian State	W 68–54	13–12 (9–7)	Holmes Center (360); Boone, NC
02/25/2016; 5:00 pm		Louisiana–Monroe	L 54–67	13–13 (9–8)	Mitchell Center (1,877); Mobile, AL
02/27/2016; 2:00 pm		Louisiana–Lafayette	W 68–59	14–13 (10–8)	Mitchell Center (2,786); Mobile, AL
03/03/2016; 5:00 pm		at Texas–Arlington	L 49–53	14–14 (10–9)	College Park Center (2,408); Arlington, TX
03/05/2016; 2:00 pm		at Texas State	W 70–56	15–14 (11–9)	Strahan Coliseum (2,001); San Marcos, TX
Sun Belt Women's Tournament
03/09/2016; 2:00 pm, ESPN3	(5)	vs. (4) Troy; Quarterfinals	L 49–62	15–15	Lakefront Arena (485); New Orleans, LA
*Non-conference game. ^{#}Rankings from AP Poll. (#) Tournament seedings in parentheses. All times are in Central Time.

== See also ==
- 2015–16 South Alabama Jaguars men's basketball team
