= 2016 Women's Basketball Invitational =

American women's college basketball tournament

- Season: 2015–16
- Teams: 16
- Champions: Louisiana–Lafayette

The 2016 Women's Basketball Invitational (WBI) was a single-elimination tournament of 16 National Collegiate Athletic Association (NCAA) Division I teams that did not participate in the 2016 NCAA Women's Division I Basketball Tournament or 2016 Women's National Invitation Tournament.

The 2016 field was announced Monday, March 14. All games were hosted by the higher seed throughout the tournament, unless the higher seed's arena was unavailable. First round WBI games were held March 16 and 17 while second-round games were held March 19 and March 20. The tournament semifinals were held March 23 with the 2016 WBI Championship game played on March 26. The Louisiana-Lafayette Ragin’ Cajuns defeated the Weber State Wildcats in double-overtime, winning the WBI for the second consecutive season.

== Bracket ==
Lower Seed hosts unless noted.
Louisiana Lafayette and Weber State will host Quarterfinals as higher seed.

*All times are listed as Eastern Daylight Time (UTC-4)

First Round; March 16–17
1	Northern Kentucky	69
8	USC Upstate	71
4	Western Illinois	99
5	Southern Illinois	97
2	New Mexico	67
7	Weber State	75
3	North Dakota	57
6	Grand Canyon	51

Quarterfinals; March 19–20
8	USC Upstate	81
4	Western Illinois	78
7	Weber State	76
3	North Dakota	74

Semifinals; March 23
8	USC Upstate	53
7	Weber State	79

First Round; March 16–17
1	Louisiana–Lafayette	69
8	Northwestern State	54
4	Stetson	89
5	McNeese State	54
2	Youngstown State	67
7	Stony Brook	60
3	UMBC	61
6	Fairfield	49

Quarterfinals; March 19
1	Louisiana-Lafayette	56
4	Stetson	47
2	Youngstown State	67
3	UMBC	48

Semifinals; March 23
1	Louisiana-Lafayette	69
2	Youngstown State	49

=== WBI Championship Game ===
Championship Game; March 26
7	Weber State	85
1	Louisiana-Lafayette	87**

* - Denotes overtime

== See also ==
- 2016 NCAA Women's Division I Basketball Tournament
- 2016 Women's National Invitation Tournament
- Women's Basketball Invitational
