= 2015–16 Troy Trojans women's basketball team =

Intercollegiate basketball season

2015–16 Troy Trojans women's basketball

Sun Belt Tournament Champions

NCAA Women's Tournament, first round
- Conference: Sun Belt Conference
- Record: 20–13 (12–8 Sun Belt)
- Head coach: Chanda Rigby (4th season)
- Assistant coaches: Jennifer Graf; Courtney Simmons; Neil Harrow
- Home arena: Trojan Arena

2015–16 Sun Belt Conference women's basketball standings
	Conf.				Overall
Team	W		L	PCT	W		L	PCT
Arkansas State	19	–	1	.950	26	–	5	.839
Little Rock	16	–	4	.800	20	–	12	.625
Louisiana–Lafayette	13	–	7	.650	21	–	10	.677
Troy †	12	–	8	.600	20	–	13	.606
South Alabama	11	–	9	.550	15	–	15	.500
UT Arlington	10	–	10	.500	15	–	16	.484
Texas State	7	–	13	.350	12	–	19	.387
Appalachian State	7	–	13	.350	10	–	20	.333
Louisiana–Monroe	6	–	14	.300	12	–	17	.414
Georgia State	5	–	15	.250	10	–	19	.345
Georgia Southern	4	–	16	.200	7	–	22	.241
† 2016 Sun Belt tournament winner

The 2015–16 Troy Trojans women's basketball team represented Troy University during the 2015–16 NCAA Division I women's basketball season. The Trojans, led by fourth year head coach Chanda Rigby, played their home games at Trojan Arena and were members of the Sun Belt Conference. They finished the season 20–13, 12–8 in Sun Belt play to finish in fourth place. They won the Sun Belt Tournament for the first time in school history and earn an automatic trip to the NCAA women's tournament for the first time since 1997. They lost in the first round to Oregon State.

== Roster ==
2015–16 Troy Trojans women's basketball team
Players
Coaches

Pos.	#	Name	Height	Year	Previous school	Hometown
G	3	Amanda Mendoza	5 ft 3 in (1.6 m)	So	Miami Sr. HS; St. Petersburg College	Miami, FL
G	4	Ashley Beverly-Kelley	5 ft 6 in (1.68 m)	Sr	Minor HS	Adamsville, AL
G	10	Jayla Chills	5 ft 10 in (1.78 m)	Jr	Ripley HS; Itawamba CC	Ripley, MS
G	11	ArJae Saunders	5 ft 7 in (1.7 m)	Jr	H.D. Woodson Sr. HS; Walters State CC	Washington, D.C.
G	14	Claresa Banks	5 ft 9 in (1.75 m)	Jr	Forest Hill HS; Copiah-Lincoln CC	Jackson, MS
G	20	Ta'Kierra Gibbs	5 ft 9 in (1.75 m)	Jr	Putnam County HS; Central Georgia Technical College	Eatonton, GA
G	21	Rachel Reid	5 ft 8 in (1.73 m)	Sr	Leto HS; Hillsborough CC	Tampa, FL
F	22	Amahni Upshaw	6 ft 1 in (1.85 m)	Fr	Brantley HS	Brantley, AL
F	23	Kristen Emerson	6 ft 1 in (1.85 m)	Jr	Prattville Christian HS	Prattville, AL
F	25	Casie Johnson	6 ft 0 in (1.83 m)	Jr	Eagle Point HS; Siskiyous	Eagle Point, OR
C	32	Dajia Williams	6 ft 3 in (1.91 m)	So	Gadsden City HS	Gadsden, AL
F	33	Lauren Day	6 ft 1 in (1.85 m)	Jr	Choctawhatchee HS	Niceville, FL
F	34	Caitlyn Ramirez	6 ft 2 in (1.88 m)	Jr	Shawnee HS; Tyler JC	Shawnee, OK
F	44	La'Tia Fils-Amie'	6 ft 1 in (1.85 m)	Fr	Daleville HS	Daleville, AL

Head coach

- Chanda Rigby (Southeastern Louisiana)

Assistant coach(es)

- Jennifer Graf (Northwestern State)
- Courtney Simmons (Louisville)
- Neil Harrow (East Central)

Legend

- (C) Team captain
- (S) Suspended
- (I) Ineligible
- (W) Walk-on
- Injured
- Current redshirt

Roster

== Schedule ==
Date time, TV	Rank^{#}	Opponent^{#}	Result	Record	Site (attendance) city, state
Exhibition
11/05/2015*; 5:15 pm		Stillman	W 118–53		Trojan Arena (627); Troy, AL
Non-conference regular season
11/13/2015*; 12:00 pm		West Alabama	W 103–72	1–0	Trojan Arena (954); Troy, AL
11/17/2015*; 6:00 pm		at Samford	L 69–73	1–1	Pete Hanna Center (469); Birmingham, AL
11/22/2015*; 2:00 pm		Fort Valley State	W 118–72	2–1	Trojan Arena (312); Troy, AL
11/29/2015*; 4:00 pm		at Belmont	L 93–102	2–2	Curb Event Center (459); Nashville, TN
12/01/2015*; 5:15 pm		Nicholls State	W 104–51	3–2	Trojan Arena (729); Troy, AL
12/10/2015*; 7:00 pm		at Vanderbilt	L 43–97	3–3	Memorial Gymnasium (2,528); Nashville, TN
12/15/2015*; 6:00 pm		at Alabama State	W 73–59	4–3	Dunn–Oliver Acadome (246); Montgomery, AL
12/18/2015*; 7:00 pm		at UAB	L 67–89	4–4	Bartow Arena (258); Birmingham, AL
12/21/2015*; 7:00 pm		at Southeastern Louisiana	W 100–90	5–4	University Center (415); Hammond, LA
Sun Belt regular season
12/30/2015; 5:15 pm		Arkansas State	L 81–101	5–5 (0–1)	Trojan Arena (879); Troy, AL
01/02/2016; 2:00 pm		Little Rock	W 78–71	6–5 (1–1)	Trojan Arena (677); Troy, AL
01/07/2016; 4:00 pm, ESPN3		at Georgia State	W 97–90	7–5 (2–1)	GSU Sports Arena (401); Atlanta, GA
01/09/2016; 1:30 pm		at Georgia Southern	W 81–66	8–5 (3–1)	Hanner Fieldhouse (511); Statesboro, GA
01/14/2016; 5:15 pm		Texas–Arlington	W 88–71	9–5 (4–1)	Trojan Arena (756); Troy, AL
01/16/2016; 2:00 pm		Texas State	W 112–79	10–5 (5–1)	Trojan Arena (635); Troy, AL
01/21/2016; 5:15 pm		at Louisiana–Monroe	L 73–77	10–6 (5–2)	Fant–Ewing Coliseum (3,284); Monroe, LA
01/23/2016; 4:00 pm, ESPN3		at Louisiana–Lafayette	L 53–56	10–7 (5–3)	Cajundome (1,292); Lafayette, LA
01/26/2016; 5:15 pm		South Alabama	L 71–75	10–8 (5–4)	Trojan Arena (834); Troy, AL
01/28/2016; 5:15 pm		Appalachian State	L 81–96	10–9 (5–5)	Trojan Arena (675); Troy, AL
02/04/2016; 5:00 pm		at Little Rock	L 64–79	10–10 (5–6)	Jack Stephens Center (3,385); Little Rock, AR
02/06/2016; 3:00 pm		at Arkansas State	L 80–94	10–11 (5–7)	Convocaton Center (775); Jonesboro, AR
02/11/2016; 5:15 pm		Georgia Southern	W 84–68	11–11 (6–7)	Trojan Arena (762); Troy, AL
02/13/2016; 2:00 pm		Georgia State	W 89–78	12–11 (7–7)	Trojan Arena (787); Troy, AL
02/16/2016; 5:00 pm		at South Alabama	L 63–65	12–12 (7–8)	Mitchell Center (3,027); Mobile, AL
02/20/2016; 2:00 pm		at Appalachian State	W 100–89	13–12 (8–8)	Holmes Center (632); Boone, NC
02/25/2016; 5:15 pm		Louisiana–Lafayette	W 90–83	14–12 (9–8)	Trojan Arena (924); Troy, AL
02/27/2016; 2:00 pm		Louisiana–Monroe	W 74–64	15–12 (10–8)	Trojan Arena (777); Troy, AL
03/03/2016; 5:30 pm		at Texas State	W 88–73	16–12 (11–8)	Strahan Coliseum; San Marcos, TX
03/05/2016; 5:00 pm		at Texas–Arlington	W 80–70	17–12 (12–8)	College Park Center (2,722); Arlington, TX
Sun Belt Women's Tournament
03/09/2016; 2:00 pm, ESPN3		vs. South Alabama; Quarterfinals	W 62–49	18–12	Lakefront Arena (485); New Orleans, LA
03/11/2016; 11:30 am, ESPN3		vs. Arkansas State; Semifinals	W 96–89	19–12	Lakefront Arena (721); New Orleans, LA
03/12/2016; 7:00 pm, ESPN3		vs. Little Rock; Championship Game	W 61–60	20–12	Lakefront Arena (908); New Orleans, LA
NCAA Women's Tournament
03/18/2016*; 4:00 pm, ESPN2	(15 D)	at (2 D) No. 6 Oregon State; First Round	L 31–73	20–13	Gill Coliseum (4,702); Corvallis, OR
*Non-conference game. ^{#}Rankings from AP Poll. (#) Tournament seedings in parentheses. D=Dallas Region. All times are in Central Time.

== See also ==
- 2015–16 Troy Trojans men's basketball team
