= 2015–16 Florida Gulf Coast Eagles women's basketball team =

Intercollegiate basketball season

2015–16 Florida Gulf Coast Eagles women's basketball
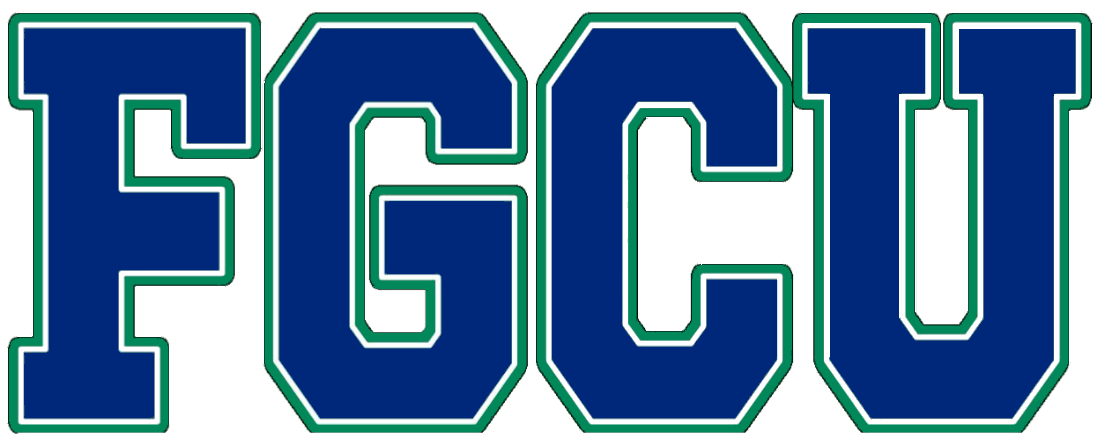

Atlantic Sun Regular Season Champions

WNIT, Runner Up
- Conference: Atlantic Sun Conference
- Record: 33–6 (14–0 A-Sun)
- Head coach: Karl Smesko (14th season)
- Assistant coaches: Chelsea Dermyer; Nicki Collen; Chelsea Lyles
- Home arena: Alico Arena

2015–16 Atlantic Sun women's basketball standings
	Conf.				Overall
Team	W		L	PCT	W		L	PCT
Florida Gulf Coast	14	–	0	1.000	33	–	5	.868
Jacksonville †	11	–	3	.786	22	–	11	.667
USC Upstate	10	–	4	.714	22	–	12	.647
Stetson	9	–	5	.643	20	–	12	.625
Kennesaw State	6	–	8	.429	11	–	19	.367
North Florida	3	–	11	.214	7	–	23	.233
Lipscomb	2	–	12	.143	5	–	25	.167
NJIT	1	–	13	.071	4	–	26	.133
† 2016 Atlantic Sun tournament winner As of April 2, 2016; Rankings from AP poll

The 2015–16 Florida Gulf Coast Eagles women's basketball team represented Florida Gulf Coast University (FGCU) in the 2015–16 NCAA Division I women's basketball season. The Eagles, led by fourteenth year head coach Karl Smesko, played their home games at Alico Arena and were members of the Atlantic Sun Conference. They finished the season 33–6, 14–0 in A-Sun play to win the Atlantic Sun regular season title. They advanced to the championship game of the A-Sun women's tournament, where they lost to Jacksonville. They received an automatic bid to the Women's National Invitation Tournament, where they advanced to the championship game where they lost to South Dakota.

== Media ==
All home games and conference road will be shown on ESPN3 or A-Sun.TV. Road games will also be broadcast on the FGCU Portal.

== Roster ==
2015–16 Florida Gulf Coast Eagles women's basketball team
Players
Coaches

Pos.	#	Name	Height	Year	Previous school	Hometown
G	0	DyTiesha Dunson	5 ft 8 in (1.73 m)	Sr	Westover HS	Albany, GA
G	1	Jessica Cattani (W)	5 ft 7 in (1.7 m)	RS So	Muskego HS	Muskego, WI
G	2	Kaneisha Atwater	5 ft 7 in (1.7 m)	Sr	Fort Pierece Westwood HS; VCU	Fort Pierce, FL
F	3	Katie Meador	5 ft 11 in (1.8 m)	Sr	Salem Community HS	Salem, IL
F	4	Bethany Murrell	5 ft 10 in (1.78 m)	Sr	New Palestine HS	New Palestine, IN
G	5	Kady Schrann	5 ft 9 in (1.75 m)	RS Sr	York Catholic HS; Vanderbilt	York, PA
G	10	Tayler Goodall	5 ft 9 in (1.75 m)	RS Fr	Columbus North HS	Columbus, IN
G	11	Amanda Moore	5 ft 10 in (1.78 m)	Sr	Seymour HS	Seymour, IN
G	12	Stephanie Haas	5 ft 8 in (1.73 m)	Sr	Magnificat HS	Avon Lake, OH
G	14	Whitney Knight	6 ft 3 in (1.91 m)	RS Sr	R.J. Reynolds HS	Winston-Salem, NC
F	20	Haley Laughter	5 ft 11 in (1.8 m)	RS Fr	Carolina Day School	Asheville, NC
G	21	Jaime Gluesing	5 ft 10 in (1.78 m)	Sr	Solon HS	Solon, OH
G	24	Taylor Gradinjan	5 ft 9 in (1.75 m)	RS So	Cudahy HS	Cudahy, WI
G	25	Sydnei McCaskill (I) (redshirt)	5 ft 6 in (1.68 m)	Jr	Dr. Phillips HS; Georgia	Orlando, FL
G	33	China Dow (I) (redshirt)	5 ft 8 in (1.73 m)	Jr	Christian Academy of Louisville; Middle Tennessee	Louisville, KY

Head coach

- Karl Smesko (Kent State)

Assistant coach(es)

- Chelsea Dermyer (Florida Gulf Coast)
- Nicki Collen (Marquette)
- Chelsea Lyles (Florida Gulf Coast)

Legend

- (C) Team captain
- (S) Suspended
- (I) Ineligible
- (W) Walk-on
- Injured
- Current redshirt

Roster

== Schedule ==
Date time, TV	Rank^{#}	Opponent^{#}	Result	Record	Site (attendance) city, state
Non-conference regular season
11/13/2015*; 5:30 pm		at North Carolina A&T	W 60–36	1–0	Corbett Sports Center (702); Greensboro, NC
11/17/2015*; 7:00 pm, ESPN3		Florida Atlantic	L 55–62	1–1	Alico Arena (1,704); Fort Myers, FL
11/20/2015*; 1:00 pm		vs. Ohio; Akron Classic	L 57–69	1–2	James A. Rhodes Arena (1,556); Akron, OH
11/21/2015*; 3:30 pm		at Akron; Akron Classic	W 82–64	2–2	James A. Rhodes Arena (743); Akron, OH
11/23/2015*; 7:00 pm		at FIU	W 81–53	3–2	FIU Arena (347); Miami, FL
11/28/2015*; 7:00 pm, ESPN3		Arkansas State	L 48–62	3–3	Alico Arena (1,280); Fort Myers, FL
12/03/2015*; 7:00 pm		at George Washington	W 64–60	4–3	Charles E. Smith Center (875); Washington, D.C.
12/05/2015*; 7:00 pm, ESPN3		Harvard	W 74–65	5–3	Alico Arena (1,697); Fort Myers, FL
12/12/2015*; 2:30 pm, FS2		at Providence	W 50–41	6–3	Alumni Hall (211); Providence, RI
12/15/2015*; 7:00 pm, ESPN3		St. Thomas	W 86–33	7–3	Alico Arena (1,135); Fort Myers, FL
12/19/2015*; 11:00 am		vs. No. 9 Mississippi State; Puerto Rico Classic	L 60–65	7–4	Coliseo Rubén Zayas Montañez; Trujillo Alto, PR
12/20/2015*; 2:30 pm		vs. Arizona; Puerto Rico Classic	W 57–55	8–4	Coliseo Rubén Zayas Montañez; Trujillo Alto, PR
12/21/2015*; 11:00 am		vs. Western Michigan; Puerto Rico Classic	W 60–42	9–4	Coliseo Rubén Zayas Montañez; Trujillo Alto, PR
12/28/2015*; 7:00 pm, ESPN3		Quinnipiac	W 71–70 ^{OT}	10–4	Alico Arena (1,533); Fort Myers, FL
12/30/2015*; 7:00 pm, ESPN3		Auburn	W 52–45	11–4	Alico Arena (1,710); Fort Myers, FL
01/02/2016*; 7:00 pm, ESPN3		Hartford	W 64–44	12–4	Alico Arena (2,217); Fort Myers, FL
Atlantic Sun regular season
01/09/2016; 4:00 pm, ESPN3		Stetson	W 61–48	13–4 (1–0)	Alico Arena (2,842); Fort Myers, FL
01/16/2016; 4:00 pm, ESPN3		USC Upstate	W 54–43	14–4 (2–0)	Alico Arena (1,628); Fort Myers, FL
01/18/2016; 7:00 pm, ESPN3		NJIT	W 70–37	15–4 (3–0)	Alico Arena (1,482); Fort Myers, FL
01/24/2016; 4:30 pm, ESPN3		at Lipscomb	W 71–39	16–4 (4–0)	Allen Arena (1,183); Nashville, TN
01/26/2016; 2:00 pm, ESPN3		at Kennesaw State	W 78–47	17–4 (5–0)	KSU Convocation Center (173); Kennesaw, GA
01/30/2016; 2:00 pm, ESPN3		at North Florida	W 65–38	18–4 (6–0)	UNF Arena (423); Jacksonville, FL
02/04/2016; 7:00 pm, ESPN3		Jacksonville	W 58–39	19–4 (7–0)	Alico Arena (2,011); Fort Myers, FL
02/06/2016; 4:00 pm, ESPN3		North Florida	W 75–50	20–4 (8–0)	Alico Arena (1,654); Fort Myers, FL
02/10/2016; 7:00 pm, ESPN3		at Jacksonville	W 59–55 ^{OT}	21–4 (9–0)	Swisher Gymnasium (379); Jacksonville, FL
02/13/2016; 1:00 pm, ESPN3		at NJIT	W 53–32	22–4 (10–0)	Fleisher Center (500); Newark, NJ
02/15/2016; 7:00 pm, ESPN3		at USC Upstate	W 56–44	23–4 (11–0)	G. B. Hodge Center (210); Spartanburg, SC
02/20/2016; 4:00 pm, ESPN3		Kennesaw State	W 63–41	24–4 (12–0)	Alico Arena (2,367); Fort Myers, FL
02/22/2016; 7:00 pm, ESPN3		Lipscomb	W 91–52	25–4 (13–0)	Alico Arena (2,074); Fort Myers, FL
02/27/2016; 1:00 pm, ESPN3		at Stetson	W 60–46	26–4 (14–0)	Edmunds Center (590); DeLand, FL
Atlantic Sun Women's Tournament
03/04/2016; 7:00 pm, ESPN3		NJIT; Quarterfinals	W 60–31	27–4	Alico Arena (1,284); Fort Myers, FL
03/09/2016; 7:00 pm, ESPN3		Stetson; Semifinals	W 61–46	28–4	Alico Arena (1,505); Fort Myers, FL
03/13/2016; 2:00 pm, ESPN3		Jacksonville; Championship Game	L 54–56	28–5	Alico Arena (2,133); Fort Myers, FL
WNIT
03/18/2016*; 7:00 pm, ESPN3		Bethune-Cookman; First Round	W 78–51	29–5	Alico Arena (1,033); Fort Myers, FL
03/21/2016*; 7:00 pm, ESPN3		Wake Forest; Second Round	W 68–47	30–5	Alico Arena (1,505); Fort Myers, FL
03/23/2016*; 7:00 pm, ESPN3		Tulane; Third Round	W 73–61	31–5	Alico Arena (1,641); Fort Myers, FL
03/28/2016*; 7:00 pm, ESPN3		Hofstra; Quarterfinals	W 61–46	32–5	Alico Arena (3,307); Fort Myers, FL
03/31/2016*; 8:00 pm, ESPN3		Michigan; Semifinals	W 71–62	33–5	Alico Arena (4,633); Fort Myers, FL
04/02/2016*; 3:00 pm, CBSSN		at South Dakota; Championship Game	L 65–71	33–6	DakotaDome (7,415); Vermillion, SD
*Non-conference game. ^{#}Rankings from AP Poll. (#) Tournament seedings in parentheses. All times are in Eastern Time.

== Rankings ==
Ranking movement Legend: ██ Increase in ranking. ██ Decrease in ranking. NR = Not ranked. RV = Received votes.
Poll	Pre- Season	Week 2	Week 3	Week 4	Week 5	Week 6	Week 7	Week 8	Week 9	Week 10	Week 11	Week 12	Week 13	Week 14	Week 15	Week 16	Week 17	Week 18	Week 19	Final
AP	RV	RV	NR	NR	NR	NR	NR	NR	NR	NR	NR	NR	NR	NR	RV	RV	RV	RV	RV	N/A
Coaches	RV	RV	NR	NR	NR	NR	NR	NR	NR	NR	RV	RV	RV	RV	RV	RV	RV	RV	RV	RV

== See also ==
- 2015–16 Florida Gulf Coast Eagles men's basketball team
