= 2015–16 Lipscomb Bisons women's basketball team =

Intercollegiate basketball season

2015–16 Lipscomb Bisons women's basketball
- Conference: Atlantic Sun Conference
- Record: 5–25 (2–12 A-Sun)
- Head coach: Greg Brown (4th season)
- Assistant coaches: Courtney Locke; Natalie Jarrett; Clay Crothers
- Home arena: Allen Arena

2015–16 Atlantic Sun women's basketball standings
	Conf.				Overall
Team	W		L	PCT	W		L	PCT
Florida Gulf Coast	14	–	0	1.000	33	–	5	.868
Jacksonville †	11	–	3	.786	22	–	11	.667
USC Upstate	10	–	4	.714	22	–	12	.647
Stetson	9	–	5	.643	20	–	12	.625
Kennesaw State	6	–	8	.429	11	–	19	.367
North Florida	3	–	11	.214	7	–	23	.233
Lipscomb	2	–	12	.143	5	–	25	.167
NJIT	1	–	13	.071	4	–	26	.133
† 2016 Atlantic Sun tournament winner As of April 2, 2016; Rankings from AP poll

The 2015–16 Lipscomb Bisons women's basketball team represented Lipscomb University in the 2015–16 NCAA Division I women's basketball season. The Bisons, led by fourth year head coach Greg Brown, played their home games at Allen Arena and were members of the Atlantic Sun Conference. They finished the season 5–25, 2–12 in A-Sun play to finish in seventh place. They lost in the quarterfinals of A-Sun Tournament to Jacksonville.

== Media ==
All home games and conference road will be shown on ESPN3 or A-Sun. TV. Non conference road games will typically be available on the opponents website.

== Roster ==
2015–16 Lipscomb Bisons women's basketball team
Players
Coaches

Pos.	#	Name	Height	Year	Previous school	Hometown
G	2	Kennedy Potts	5 ft 10 in (1.78 m)	So	Harpeth Hall School	Nashville, TN
F	4	Jessica Davies	6 ft 1 in (1.85 m)	Fr	Charnwood College	Watford, England
G	5	Chandler Cooper	5 ft 11 in (1.8 m)	Sr	Clarksville; Florida	Clarksville, TN
G	10	Bri Melton	5 ft 8 in (1.73 m)	Fr	Smith County	McMinnville, TN
G	11	Amber Fuqua	6 ft 0 in (1.83 m)	So	Sycamore	Nashville, TN
F	12	Ashley Southern	6 ft 1 in (1.85 m)	RS Sr	Deshler; Chattanooga	Tuscumbia, AL
F	14	Kelsey Gregory	6 ft 0 in (1.83 m)	RS So	Macon County	Lafayette, TN
G	21	Kelli Smith	5 ft 5 in (1.65 m)	Sr	Lipscomb Academy	Nashville, TN
G	22	Loren Cagle	5 ft 5 in (1.65 m)	RS So	Lipscomb Academy	Nashville, TN
F	24	Alex Gates	5 ft 11 in (1.8 m)	RS Jr	Beech	Hendersonville, TN
F	25	Morgan Turner	6 ft 2 in (1.88 m)	Fr	Meade County	Guston, KY
F	42	Riley Northway	6 ft 2 in (1.88 m)	So	Brewer	Somerville, AL

Head coach

- Greg Brown (Lipscomb)

Assistant coach(es)

- Courtney Locke (Rutgers)
- Natalie Jarrett (UCLA)
- Clay Crothers (Lipscomb)

Legend

- (C) Team captain
- (S) Suspended
- (I) Ineligible
- (W) Walk-on
- Injured
- Current redshirt

Roster

== Schedule ==
Date time, TV	Rank^{#}	Opponent^{#}	Result	Record	Site (attendance) city, state
Exhibition
10/29/2015*; 6:30 pm		Freed–Hardeman	W 63–60		Allen Arena; Nashville, TN
11/07/2015*; 6:30 pm		Young Harris College	W 100–61		Allen Arena; Nashville, TN
Non-conference regular season
11/13/2015*; 6:30 pm, ESPN3		Loyola (MD)	L 52–57	0–1	Allen Arena (160); Nashville, TN
11/15/2015*; 1:00 pm		at Georgia Southern	W 66–55	1–1	Hanner Fieldhouse; Statesboro, GA
11/19/2015*; 6:00 pm, ESPN3		at Wright State	L 65–92	1–2	Nutter Center (526); Fairborn, OH
11/22/2015*; 2:00 pm		at Tennessee Tech	L 70–81	1–3	Eblen Center (724); Cookeville, TN
11/24/2015*; 6:30 pm, ESPN3		Murray State	W 93–85	2–3	Allen Arena (215); Nashville, TN
11/28/2015*; 1:00 pm		vs. North Alabama; Teresa Phillips Thanksgiving Classic	W 88–67	3–3	Gentry Complex (326); Nashville, TN
11/29/2015*; 12:00 pm		vs. Texas Southern; Teresa Phillips Thanksgiving Classic	L 62–66	3–4	Gentry Complex (328); Nashville, TN
12/02/2015*; 6:30 pm, ESPN3		Belmont; Battle of the Boulevard	L 68–90	3–5	Allen Arena (226); Nashville, TN
12/05/2015*; 1:30 pm, ESPN3		Morehead State	L 77–92	3–6	Allen Arena (215); Nashville, TN
12/08/2015*; 6:30 pm, ESPN3		Southeast Missouri State	L 69–84	3–7	Allen Arena (175); Nashville, TN
12/10/2015*; 5:00 pm, ESPN3		Ball State	L 60–72	3–8	Allen Arena (150); Nashville, TN
12/13/2015*; 3:00 pm		at Tennessee State	L 65–77	3–9	Gentry Complex (295); Nashville, TN
12/21/2015*; 6:00 pm, ESPN3		WKU	L 56–64	3–10	Allen Arena (215); Nashville, TN
12/28/2015*; 6:00 pm		at Alabama	L 49–68	3–11	Foster Auditorium (2,440); Tuscaloosa, AL
12/30/2015*; 5:00 pm		at Jackson State	L 52–53	3–12	Williams Assembly Center (403); Jackson, MS
Atlantic Sun regular season
01/09/2016; 1:00 pm, ESPN3		at Kennesaw State	L 54–55	3–13 (0–1)	KSU Convocation Center (612); Kennesaw, GA
01/16/2016; 12:00 pm, ESPN3		at Jacksonville	L 51–81	3–14 (0–2)	Swisher Gymnasium (347); Jacksonville, FL
01/18/2016; 6:00 pm, ESPN3		at North Florida	L 70–78	3–15 (0–3)	UNF Arena (308); Jacksonville, FL
01/24/2016; 3:30 pm, ESPN3		Florida Gulf Coast	L 39–71	3–16 (0–4)	Allen Arena (1,183); Nashville, TN
01/25/2016; 6:30 pm, ESPN3		Stetson	L 62–83	3–17 (0–5)	Allen Arena (310); Nashville, TN
01/30/2016; 1:30 pm, ESPN3		USC Upstate	L 54–81	3–18 (0–6)	Allen Arena (340); Nashville, TN
02/04/2016; 6:00 pm, ESPN3		at NJIT	L 51–61	3–19 (0–7)	Fleisher Center (355); Newark, NJ
02/06/2016; 3:30 pm, ESPN3		at USC Upstate	L 71–93	3–20 (0–8)	G. B. Hodge Center (228); Spartanburg, SC
02/10/2016; 6:30 pm, ESPN3		NJIT	W 63–49	4–20 (1–8)	Allen Arena (44); Nashville, TN
02/13/2016; 1:30 pm, ESPN3		North Florida	W 78–71	5–20 (2–8)	Allen Arena; Nashville, TN
02/15/2016; 6:30 pm, ESPN3		Jacksonville	L 55–76	5–21 (2–9)	Allen Arena (264); Nashville, TN
02/20/2016; 6:00 pm, ESPN3		at Stetson	L 75–79	5–22 (2–10)	Edmunds Center (444); DeLand, FL
02/22/2016; 6:00 pm, ESPN3		at Florida Gulf Coast	L 52–91	5–23 (2–11)	Alico Arena (2,074); Fort Myers, FL
02/27/2016; 4:00 pm, ESPN3		Kennesaw State	L 64–68	5–24 (2–12)	Allen Arena; Nashville, TN
Atlantic Sun Women's Tournament
03/04/2016; 6:00 pm, ESPN3		at Jacksonville; Quarterfinals	L 51–80	5–25	Swisher Gymnasium (263); Jacksonville, FL
*Non-conference game. ^{#}Rankings from AP Poll. (#) Tournament seedings in parentheses. All times are in Central Time.

== See also ==
- 2015–16 Lipscomb Bisons men's basketball team
