= 2015–16 Louisiana–Lafayette Ragin' Cajuns women's basketball team =

Intercollegiate basketball season

2015–16 Louisiana–Lafayette Ragin' Cajuns women's basketball

Women's Basketball Invitational champion
- Conference: Sun Belt Conference
- Record: 25–10 (13–7 Sun Belt)
- Head coach: Garry Brodhead (4th season)
- Assistant coaches: Deacon Jones; Katherine Katz; Amber Gregg
- Home arena: Cajundome; Earl K. Long Gymnasium (3 games)

2015–16 Sun Belt Conference women's basketball standings
	Conf.				Overall
Team	W		L	PCT	W		L	PCT
Arkansas State	19	–	1	.950	26	–	5	.839
Little Rock	16	–	4	.800	20	–	12	.625
Louisiana–Lafayette	13	–	7	.650	21	–	10	.677
Troy †	12	–	8	.600	20	–	13	.606
South Alabama	11	–	9	.550	15	–	15	.500
UT Arlington	10	–	10	.500	15	–	16	.484
Texas State	7	–	13	.350	12	–	19	.387
Appalachian State	7	–	13	.350	10	–	20	.333
Louisiana–Monroe	6	–	14	.300	12	–	17	.414
Georgia State	5	–	15	.250	10	–	19	.345
Georgia Southern	4	–	16	.200	7	–	22	.241
† 2016 Sun Belt tournament winner

The 2015–16 Louisiana–Lafayette Ragin' Cajuns women's basketball team represented the University of Louisiana at Lafayette during the 2015–16 NCAA Division I women's basketball season. The Ragin' Cajuns were led by fourth-year head coach Garry Brodhead and played all their home games at the Cajundome with a select few (mainly during the WBI) at Earl K. Long Gymnasium, which is located on the University of Louisiana at Lafayette campus. They were members in the Sun Belt Conference. They finished the season 25-10, 13–7 in Sun Belt play to finish in third place. They advanced to the semifinal game of the Sun Belt women's tournament where they lost to Little Rock by the score of 52-63. They competed in the Women's Basketball Invitational and went to the championship game, winning by the score of 87-85 in two overtimes against the Weber State Wildcats

== Previous season ==
The Ragin' Cajuns finished the 2014–15 season 23-12, 10–10 in Sun Belt play to finish sixth in the conference. They made it to the 2015 Sun Belt Conference Women's Basketball semifinal game after defeating Troy in the first round game before losing to Arkansas State Red Wolves in the semifinals. They would continue on to be invited to the Women's Basketball Invitational for the first time in school history, and would eventually be crowned National Champions in the WBI after defeating UT Pan American, McNeese State, Oral Roberts, and Siena in the first round, second round, semifinals, and championship game, respectively.

== Roster ==
2015–16 Louisiana-Lafayette Ragin' Cajuns women's basketball team
Players
Coaches

Pos.	#	Name	Height	Year	Previous school	Hometown
G/F	1	Brooklyn Arceneaux	5 ft 9 in (1.75 m)	RS Sr	St. Thomas More HS	Lafayette, LA
C	3	Breionne Cooper	6 ft 3 in (1.91 m)	Fr	West Jefferson HS	New Orleans, LA
F	5	Jordan Alexander	6 ft 1 in (1.85 m)	Fr	Skyline HS	Dallas, TX
G	10	Kia Wilridge	5 ft 5 in (1.65 m)	Sr	St. Thomas More HS	Crowley, LA
G	11	Jaylyn Gordon	5 ft 5 in (1.65 m)	Jr	West St. John HS	Edgard, LA
F	14	Adrienne Prejean	5 ft 9 in (1.75 m)	Sr	Lafayette HS	Lafayette, LA
G/F	15	Jodi Quinn	5 ft 7 in (1.7 m)	So	St. Thomas More HS	St. Martinville, LA
F	21	Jasmin Mills	6 ft 1 in (1.85 m)	Sr	Assumption HS	Belle Rose, LA
G/F	22	Gabby Alexander	5 ft 11 in (1.8 m)	Jr	Bogalusa HS	Bogalusa, LA
G	23	Taylor Washington	5 ft 7 in (1.7 m)	Jr	Bowie HS; Panola College	Arlington, TX
G	24	Keke Veal	5 ft 6 in (1.68 m)	Sr	St. Thomas More HS	Opelousas, LA
G	25	Sylvana Okde	5 ft 6 in (1.68 m)	Jr	Westbury Christian School	Houston, TX
F	32	Simone Fields	6 ft 0 in (1.83 m)	So	Converse Judson HS	San Antonio, TX
C	33	Alex Weeks	6 ft 4 in (1.93 m)	Fr	Beau Chene HS	Opelousas, LA
		Nekia Jones	—	Jr	Ozen HS; Texas	Beaumont, TX

Head coach

- Garry Boadhead (Louisiana)

Assistant coach(es)

- Deacon Jones (Louisiana)
- Katherine Katz (Birmingham–Southern)
- Amber Gregg (Texas–San Antonio)

Legend

- (C) Team captain
- (S) Suspended
- (I) Ineligible
- (W) Walk-on
- Injured
- Current redshirt

Roster
Last update: March 17, 2019

== Schedule and results ==
Date time, TV	Rank^{#}	Opponent^{#}	Result	Record	High points	High rebounds	High assists	Site (attendance) city, state
Exhibition
11/09/2015*; 5:00 pm		LSU–Alexandria	W 95-48		27 – Gordon	10 – Quinn	3 – Veal	Cajundome; Lafayette, LA
11/12/2015*; 7:00 pm		Xavier (LA)	W 77-69		27 – Gordon	9 – Wilridge	4 – Gordon	Cajundome (356); Lafayette, LA
Non-conference regular season
11/15/2015*; 7:00 pm		at Ole Miss	W 82-78	1-0	29 – Gordon	11 – Tied	4 – Wilridge	Tad Smith Coliseum (789); Oxford, MS
11/19/2015*; 7:00 pm		Southern-New Orleans	W 81-28	2-0	15 – Fields	7 – J. Alexander	3 – Gordon	Earl K. Long Gymnasium (392); Lafayette, LA
11/22/2015*; 2:00 pm		at Houston	L 51-52	2-1	19 – Wilridge	5 – Wilridge	4 – Gordon	Hofheinz Pavilion (909); Houston, TX
11/27/2015*; 1:30 pm		vs. Arkansas; San Juan Shootout	W 67-59	3-1	20 – Veal	6 – Fields	4 – Wilridge	Mario Morales Coliseum; San Juan, Puerto Rico
11/28/2015*; 11:15 am		vs. Sacred Heart; San Juan Shootout	W 60-58 ^{OT}	4-1	13 – Veal	9 – Arceneaux	4 – Wilridge	Mario Morales Coliseum; San Juan, Puerto Rico
Sun Belt regular season
12/03/2015; 5:00 pm		at Louisiana-Monroe	W 71-52	5-1	21 – Gordon	8 – Gordon	7 – Veal	Fant-Ewing Coliseum; Monroe, LA
Non-conference regular season
12/12/2015*; 2:00 pm		Dillard	W 84-36	6-1	18 – Wilridge	9 – Wilridge	2 – Veal	Cajundome (695); Lafayette, LA
12/15/2015*; 11:00 am		UC Santa Barbara	W 61-42	7-1	14 – Wilridge	13 – Wilridge	3 – Wilridge	Cajundome (2,773); Lafayette, LA
12/19/2015*; 6:00 pm		at Louisiana Tech	L 62-79	7-2	23 – Veal	6 – Wilridge	5 – Gordon	Thomas Assembly Center (1,818); Ruston, LA
12/29/2015*; 7:00 pm		Alcorn State	W 73-61	8-2	22 – Veal	7 – Gordon	6 – Gordon	Cajundome (762); Lafayette, LA
Sun Belt regular season
01/02/2016; 5:00 pm		Appalachian State	W 60-51	9-2	15 – Wilridge	7 – Arceneaux	6 – Gordon	Cajundome (1,166); Lafayette, LA
01/07/2016; 5:15 pm		at Little Rock	W 65-58	10-2	30 – Veal	6 – Cooper	5 – Gordon	Jack Stephens Center (3,218); Little Rock, AR
01/09/2016; 3:05 pm		at Arkansas State	L 56-83	10-3	18 – Veal	9 – Tied	4 – Gordon	Convocation Center (809); Jonesboro, AR
01/14/2016; 4:00 pm, ESPN3		at Georgia Southern	W 56-39	11-3	17 – Wilridge	13 – Cooper	4 – Veal	Hanner Fieldhouse (424); Statesboro, GA
01/16/2016; 11:00 am, ESPN3		at Georgia State	W 77-57	12-3	24 – Gordon	6 – Wilridge	7 – Gordon	GSU Sports Arena (454); Atlanta, GA
01/21/2016; 5:00 pm		South Alabama	W 69-50	13-3	14 – Gordon	8 – Arceneaux	5 – Gordon	Cajundome (778); Lafayette, LA
01/23/2016; 4:00 pm, ESPN3		Troy	W 56-53	14-3	23 – Gordon	9 – Arceneaux	5 – Gordon	Cajundome (1,292); Lafayette, LA
01/28/2016; 5:00 pm		Texas State	L 42-46	14-4	10 – Wilridge	9 – Wilridge	4 – Wilridge	Cajundome (1,476); Lafayette, LA
01/30/2016; 2:00 pm		UT Arlington	W 63-52	15-4	21 – Veal	6 – Wilridge	4 – Veal	Cajundome (864); Lafayette, LA
02/02/2016; 5:00 pm		Louisiana–Monroe	W 52-40	16-4	19 – Fields	10 – Fields	2 – Arceneaux	Cajundome (811); Lafayette, LA
02/04/2016; 4:00 pm, ESPN3		at Appalachian State	L 59-76	16-5	27 – Veal	9 – Fields	5 – Wilridge	Holmes Center (299); Boone, NC
02/11/2016; 5:00 pm		Arkansas State	L 62-74	16-6	25 – Veal	5 – Washington	3 – Veal	Cajundome (958); Lafayette, LA
02/13/2016; 2:00 pm, ESPN3		Little Rock	L 49-58	16-7	12 – Veal	5 – Wilridge	5 – Veal	Cajundome (1,132); Lafayette, LA
02/18/2016; 11:30 am		at UT Arlington	W 59-42	17-7	19 – Fields	9 – Veal	3 – Wilridge	College Park Center (3,007); Arlington, TX
02/20/2016; 2:00 pm		at Texas State	W 59-47	18-7	25 – Veal	10 – Fields	7 – Wilridge	Strahan Coliseum; San Marcos, TX
02/25/2016; 5:15 pm		at Troy	L 83-90	18-8	34 – Veal	9 – Wilridge	9 – Wilridge	Trojan Arena (924); Troy, AL
02/27/2016; 2:00 pm		at South Alabama	L 59-68	18-9	26 – Veal	12 – Fields	3 – Veal	Mitchell Center (2,786); Mobile, AL
03/03/2016; 5:00 pm		Georgia State	W 65-60	19-9	20 – Veal	8 – Prejean	6 – Wilridge	Cajundome (869); Lafayette, LA
03/05/2016; 5:00 pm		Georgia Southern	W 56-49	20-9	17 – Veal	7 – Wilridge	5 – Wilridge	Cajundome (852); Lafayette, LA
Sun Belt Women's Tournament
03/09/2016; 7:30 pm, ESPN3	(3)	vs. (6) UT Arlington; First Round	W 59-53	21-9	18 – Fields	7 – Arceneaux	4 – Veal	Lakefront Arena; New Orleans, LA
03/11/2016; 2:00 pm, ESPN3	(3)	vs. (2) Little Rock; Semifinals	L 52-63	21-10	17 – Veal	6 – Fields	4 – Wilridge	Lakefront Arena; New Orleans, LA
Women's Basketball Invitational
03/16/2016; 5:00 pm	(1)	vs. (8) Northwestern State; First Round	W 69-54	22-10	26 – Veal	5 – Quinn	5 – Veal	Cajundome (803); Lafayette, LA
03/19/2016; 7:00 pm	(1)	vs. (4) Stetson; Second Round	W 56-47	23-10	17 – Veal	6 – Veal	4 – Arceneaux	Earl K. Long Gymnasium (312); Lafayette, LA
03/23/2016; 5:00 pm	(1)	vs. (2) Youngstown State; Semifinals	W 69-49	24-10	22 – Wilridge	8 – Veal	3 – Veal	Cajundome (1,317); Lafayette, LA
03/26/2016; 4:00 pm	(1)	vs. (7) Weber State; Championship	W 87-85 ^{2OT}	25-10	32 – Veal	11 – Wilridge	4 – Veal	Earl K. Long Gymnasium (636); Lafayette, LA
*Non-conference game. ^{#}Rankings from AP Poll. (#) Tournament seedings in parentheses. All times are in Central Time.

== See also ==
- 2015–16 Louisiana–Lafayette Ragin' Cajuns men's basketball team
