= 2015–16 Jacksonville Dolphins women's basketball team =

Intercollegiate basketball season

2015–16 Jacksonville Dolphins women's basketball
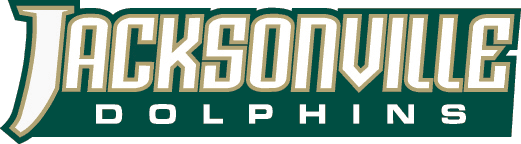

Atlantic Sun Tournament Champions

NCAA Women's Tournament, first round
- Conference: Atlantic Sun Conference
- Record: 22–11 (11–3 A-Sun)
- Head coach: Yolett McPhee-McCuin (3rd season)
- Assistant coaches: Darnell Haney; Camille Collier; Ed Mahan
- Home arena: Swisher Gymnasium

2015–16 Atlantic Sun women's basketball standings
	Conf.				Overall
Team	W		L	PCT	W		L	PCT
Florida Gulf Coast	14	–	0	1.000	33	–	5	.868
Jacksonville †	11	–	3	.786	22	–	11	.667
USC Upstate	10	–	4	.714	22	–	12	.647
Stetson	9	–	5	.643	20	–	12	.625
Kennesaw State	6	–	8	.429	11	–	19	.367
North Florida	3	–	11	.214	7	–	23	.233
Lipscomb	2	–	12	.143	5	–	25	.167
NJIT	1	–	13	.071	4	–	26	.133
† 2016 Atlantic Sun tournament winner As of April 2, 2016; Rankings from AP poll

The 2015–16 Jacksonville Dolphins women's basketball team represented Jacksonville University in the 2015–16 NCAA Division I women's basketball season. The Dolphins, led by third year head coach Yolett McPhee-McCuin, played their home games at Swisher Gymnasium and were members of the Atlantic Sun Conference. They finished the season 22–11, 11–3 in A-Sun play to finish in second place. They won the Atlantic Sun Tournament to earn an automatic trip to the NCAA women's tournament for the first time in school history where they lost to South Carolina in the first round.

== Media ==
All home games and conference road games were shown on ESPN3 or A-Sun.TV.

== NCAA invitation ==
The Jacksonville Dolphins took on the Florida Gulf Coast Eagles, who had not lost a game to a conference opponent on their home court in the prior 71 games, in the Atlantic Sun championship game. The Dolphins did not hold the lead in the second half until Brandi Buie hit a baseline jumper with just over three seconds left in the game. The Eagles were unable to score on the last possession, so Jacksonville won the tournament championship and an invitation to their first ever NCAA tournament. The Dolphins are now on an eight-game winning streak.

== Roster ==
2015–16 Jacksonville Dolphins women's basketball team
Players
Coaches

Pos.	#	Name	Height	Year	Previous school	Hometown
G	1	Loliya Briggs	5 ft 11 in (1.8 m)	RS Sr	Potter's House Christian Acad. Pittsburgh	Gainesville, FL
G	3	Keanua Williams	5 ft 10 in (1.78 m)	So	Crestwood	Sumter, SC
G	4	Brandi Buie	5 ft 8 in (1.73 m)	So	Randolph-Clay	Tampa, FL
G	5	Jillah Moede	5 ft 8 in (1.73 m)	Fr	Centennial	Houston, TX
G	10	Jasmyn Brown	5 ft 10 in (1.78 m)	Fr	Haines City	Haines City, FL
F	13	Kimberly Dawkins	6 ft 0 in (1.83 m)	Jr	Jonesboro	Atlanta, GA
F	15	Kayla Gordon	6 ft 0 in (1.83 m)	So	Meridian	Meridian, MS
F	21	Christin Mercer	6 ft 1 in (1.85 m)	RS Jr	Douglas County; Florida	Douglasville, GA
G	22	Sherranda Reddick	5 ft 8 in (1.73 m)	Jr	Ribault	Jacksonville, FL
F	24	Briona Brown	5 ft 11 in (1.8 m)	Sr	Haines City	Haines City, FL
C	42	Shalonda Neely	6 ft 0 in (1.83 m)	Fr	Arlington Country Day	Freeport, Grand Bahama

Head coach

Yolett McPhee-McCuin (Rhode Island)

Assistant coach(es)

Darnell Haney (Florida A&M)
Camille Collier (Wake Forest)
Ed Mahan (Clemson)

Legend

- (C) Team captain
- (S) Suspended
- (I) Ineligible
- (W) Walk-on
- Injured
- Current redshirt

Roster

== Schedule ==
Date time, TV	Rank^{#}	Opponent^{#}	Result	Record	Site (attendance) city, state
Exhibition
11/07/2015*; 7:00 pm		Flagler College	W 78–41		Swisher Gymnasium (446); Jacksonville, FL
Non-conference regular season
11/13/2015*; 6:00 pm		at No. 20 South Florida; Preseason WNIT First Round	L 52–74	0–1	USF Sun Dome; Tampa, FL
11/20/2015*; 8:15 pm		at Texas–Arlington; Preseason WNIT Consolation round	L 54–56	0–2	College Park Center (804); Arlington, TX
11/21/2015*; 6:00 pm		vs. Dartmouth; Preseason WNIT Consolation round	W 51–44	1–2	College Park Center; Arlington, TX
11/24/2015*; 7:00 pm, ESPN3		Thomas University	W 88–50	2–2	Swisher Gymnasium (135); Jacksonville, FL
11/27/2015*; 2:00 pm		at UNC Wilmington; UNCW Hampton Inn Thanksgiving Classic	L 49–51	2–3	Trask Coliseum (344); Wilmington, NC
11/28/2015*; 12:00 pm		vs. Bowling Green; UNCW Hampton Inn Thanksgiving Classic	L 69–72 ^{OT}	2–4	Trask Coliseum; Wilmington, NC
12/01/2015*; 7:00 pm, ESPN3		Edward Waters	W 90–51	3–4	Swisher Gymnasium (218); Jacksonville, FL
12/06/2015*; 12:00 pm, ESPN3		FIU	W 80–44	4–4	Swisher Gymnasium (217); Jacksonville, FL
12/12/2015*; 1:00 pm		at Bethune-Cookman	W 63–53	5–4	Moore Gymnasium (108); Daytona Beach, FL
12/14/2015*; 11:00 am		at Wake Forest	L 51–57	5–5	LJVM Coliseum (8,849); Winston-Salem, NC
12/17/2015*; 11:00 am, ESPN3		Murray State	W 79–54	6–5	Swisher Gymnasium (675); Jacksonville, FL
12/21/2015*; 7:00 pm		at Syracuse	L 49–65	6–6	Carrier Dome (404); Syracuse, NY
12/28/2015*; 2:00 pm, ESPN3		at No. 15 Florida State	L 60–77	6–7	Donald L. Tucker Center (2,571); Tallahassee, FL
12/30/2015*; 7:00 pm, ESPN3		South Carolina State	W 79–47	7–7	Swisher Gymnasium (169); Jacksonville, FL
01/02/2016*; 2:00 pm, ESPN3		Savannah State	W 65–52	8–7	Swisher Gymnasium (169); Jacksonville, FL
Atlantic Sun regular season
01/09/2016; 1:00 pm, ESPN3		at North Florida	W 73–39	9–7 (1–0)	UNF Arena (729); Jacksonville, FL
01/16/2016; 12:00 pm, ESPN3		Lipscomb	W 81–51	10–7 (2–0)	Swisher Gymnasium (347); Jacksonville, FL
01/18/2016; 7:00 pm, ESPN3		Kennesaw State	W 76–63	11–7 (3–0)	Swisher Gymnasium (457); Jacksonville, FL
01/23/2016; 7:00 pm, ESPN3		at USC Upstate	W 49–43	12–7 (4–0)	G. B. Hodge Center; Spartanburg, SC
01/26/2016; 7:00 pm, ESPN3		at NJIT	W 65–36	13–7 (5–0)	Fleisher Center (335); Newark, NJ
01/30/2016; 1:00 pm, ESPN3		Stetson	W 69–49	14–7 (6–0)	Swisher Gymnasium (367); Jacksonville, FL
02/04/2016; 7:00 pm, ESPN3		at Florida Gulf Coast	L 39–58	14–8 (6–1)	Alico Arena (2,011); Fort Myers, FL
02/04/2016; 7:00 pm, ESPN3		at Stetson	L 61–66	14–9 (6–2)	Edmunds Center (856); DeLand, FL
02/10/2016; 7:00 pm, ESPN3		Florida Gulf Coast	L 55–59 ^{OT}	14–10 (6–3)	Swisher Gymnasium (379); Jacksonville, FL
02/13/2016; 2:00 pm, ESPN3		at Kennesaw State	W 67–42	15–10 (7–3)	KSU Convocation Center (576); Kennesaw, GA
02/15/2016; 7:30 pm, ESPN3		at Lipscomb	W 76–55	16–10 (8–3)	Allen Arena (264); Nashville, TN
02/20/2016; 1:00 pm, ESPN3		NJIT	W 68–37	17–10 (9–3)	Swisher Gymnasium (152); Jacksonville, FL
02/22/2016; 7:00 pm, ESPN3		USC Upstate	W 75–69 ^{OT}	18–10 (10–3)	Swisher Gymnasium (876); Jacksonville, FL
02/27/2016; 7:00 pm, ESPN3		North Florida	W 65–51	19–10 (11–3)	Swisher Gymnasium (1,015); Jacksonville, FL
Atlantic Sun Women's Tournament
03/04/2016; 7:00 pm, ESPN3		Lipscomb; Quarterfinals	W 80–51	20–10	Swisher Gymnasium (263); Jacksonville, FL
03/09/2016; 7:00 pm, ESPN3		USC Upstate; Semifinals	W 67–56	21–10	Swisher Gymnasium (432); Jacksonville, FL
03/13/2016; 2:00 pm, ESPN3		at Florida Gulf Coast; Championship Game	W 56–54	22–10	Alico Arena (2,133); Fort Myers, FL
NCAA Women's Tournament
03/18/2016*; 7:30 pm, ESPN2	(16 SF)	at (1 SF) No. 3 South Carolina; First Round	L 41–77	22–11	Colonial Life Arena (10,276); Columbia, SC
*Non-conference game. ^{#}Rankings from AP Poll. (#) Tournament seedings in parentheses. SF=Sioux Falls Region. All times are in Eastern Time.

== See also ==
- 2015–16 Jacksonville Dolphins men's basketball team
