= 2015–16 USC Upstate Spartans women's basketball team =

Intercollegiate basketball season

2015–16 USC Upstate Spartans women's basketball

WBI, Semifinals
- Conference: Atlantic Sun Conference
- Record: 22–11 (10–4 A-Sun)
- Head coach: Tammy George (11th season)
- Assistant coaches: Ayana McWilliams; Jason Rasnake; Bill Tender
- Home arena: G. B. Hodge Center

2015–16 Atlantic Sun women's basketball standings
	Conf.				Overall
Team	W		L	PCT	W		L	PCT
Florida Gulf Coast	14	–	0	1.000	33	–	5	.868
Jacksonville †	11	–	3	.786	22	–	11	.667
USC Upstate	10	–	4	.714	22	–	12	.647
Stetson	9	–	5	.643	20	–	12	.625
Kennesaw State	6	–	8	.429	11	–	19	.367
North Florida	3	–	11	.214	7	–	23	.233
Lipscomb	2	–	12	.143	5	–	25	.167
NJIT	1	–	13	.071	4	–	26	.133
† 2016 Atlantic Sun tournament winner As of April 2, 2016; Rankings from AP poll

The 2015–16 USC Upstate Spartans women's basketball team represented the University of South Carolina Upstate in the 2015–16 NCAA Division I women's basketball season. The Spartans, led by eleventh year head coach Tammy George, played their games at G. B. Hodge Center and are members of the Atlantic Sun Conference. They finished the season 22–12, 10–4 in A-Sun play to finish in third place. They advanced to the semifinals of the A-Sun women's tournament, where they lost to Jacksonville. They were invited to the Women's Basketball Invitational, where they defeated Northern Kentucky in the first round, Western Illinois in the quarterfinals before losing to Weber State in the semifinals.

== Media ==
All home games and conference road will be shown on ESPN3 or A-Sun.TV. Non conference road games will typically be available on the opponents website.

== Roster ==
2015–16 USC Upstate Spartans women's basketball team
Players
Coaches

Pos.	#	Name	Height	Year	Previous school	Hometown
G	0	Rose Robinson	5 ft 5 in (1.65 m)	Jr	Spartanburg Methodist College	Irmo, SC
G	1	Tamera Thrope	5 ft 8 in (1.73 m)	Fr	Greensboro Day School	Greensboro, NC
G	3	Travonda Haddock	5 ft 9 in (1.75 m)	Sr	Jones Senior HS	Pollocksville, NC
G	11	Brittany Clency	5 ft 7 in (1.7 m)	Sr	Western Guilford HS	Greensboro, NC
G	13	Raven Jefferson	5 ft 9 in (1.75 m)	Jr	Liberty Christian Academy	Lynchburg, VA
G	14	Vanessa Agrusa	5 ft 10 in (1.78 m)	Fr	Franklin HS	Franklin, NC
C	15	Coco Ritter	6 ft 2 in (1.88 m)	So	Orangeburg-Wilkerson HS	Orangeburg, SC
G	20	Bailey Wensler	5 ft 8 in (1.73 m)	Fr	Perkins-Tryon HS	Stillwater, OK
G	21	Kristen Dickerson	5 ft 7 in (1.7 m)	Sr	Pensacola State College	Montgomery, AL
G	23	DeNisha Swain	5 ft 7 in (1.7 m)	Fr	Potter's House Christian Academy	Jacksonville, FL
C	24	A'Lexxus Davis	6 ft 1 in (1.85 m)	So	Potter's House Christian Academy	Jacksonville, FL
F	32	Dae Dae Jordan	5 ft 10 in (1.78 m)	Fr	Hephzibah HS	Hephzibah, GA
C	34	Brittany Starling	6 ft 0 in (1.83 m)	Sr	Sumter HS	Sumter, SC
G	35	Victoria Hadler	5 ft 11 in (1.8 m)	Fr	Deerfield HS	Deerfield Beach, FL

Head coach

- Tammy George (Charlotte)

Assistant coach(es)

- Ayana McWilliams (Brevard)
- Jason Rasnake (NC State)
- Bill Tender (Wofford)

Legend

- (C) Team captain
- (S) Suspended
- (I) Ineligible
- (W) Walk-on
- Injured
- Current redshirt

Roster

== Schedule ==
Date time, TV	Rank^{#}	Opponent^{#}	Result	Record	Site (attendance) city, state
Non-conference regular season
11/13/2015*; 6:00 pm		at Norfolk State	W 82–62	1–0	Echols Hall (433); Norfolk, VA
11/15/2015*; 6:00 pm		at Maryland Eastern Shore	L 59–78	1–1	Hytche Athletic Center (532); Princess Anne, MD
11/17/2015*; 7:00 pm		Bob Jones	W 96–46	2–1	G. B. Hodge Center (420); Spartanburg, SC
11/17/2015*; 5:00 pm		Southern Wesleyan	W 84–51	3–1	G. B. Hodge Center (213); Spartanburg, SC
11/21/2015*; 7:00 pm		at IPFW	W 84–81	4–1	Memorial Coliseum (282); Fort Wayne, IN
11/23/2015*; 7:00 pm		at Michigan	L 61–119	4–2	Crisler Center (1,589); Ann Arbor, MI
11/27/2015*; 3:00 pm		at UNC Asheville	L 59–68	4–3	Kimmel Arena (360); Asheville, NC
12/01/2015*; 7:00 pm, ESPN3		UNC Greensboro	W 84–61	5–3	G. B. Hodge Center (237); Spartanburg, SC
12/05/2015*; 2:00 pm		at Georgia Tech	L 46–87	5–4	Hank McCamish Pavilion (579); Atlanta, GA
12/12/2015*; 2:00 pm, ESPN3		Furman	L 63–75	5–5	G. B. Hodge Center (237); Spartanburg, SC
12/14/2015*; 12:00 pm		at Morehead State	W 86–72	6–5	Ellis Johnson Arena (3,045); Morehead, KY
12/16/2015*; 4:00 pm		at North Carolina	L 40–80	6–6	Carmichael Arena (1,487); Chapel Hill, NC
12/19/2015*; 2:00 pm, ESPN3		North Carolina Central	W 68–46	7–6	G. B. Hodge Center (205); Spartanburg, SC
12/30/2015*; 5:00 pm		Mars Hill	W 81–65	8–6	G. B. Hodge Center (132); Spartanburg, SC
01/02/2016*; 4:30 pm, ESPN3		Western Carolina	W 68–59	9–6	G. B. Hodge Center (187); Spartanburg, SC
Atlantic Sun regular season
01/09/2016; 1:00 pm, ESPN3		at NJIT	W 58–41	10–6 (1–0)	Fleisher Center (202); Newark, NJ
01/16/2016; 4:00 pm, ESPN3		at Florida Gulf Coast	L 43–54	10–7 (1–1)	Alico Arena (1,628); Fort Myers, FL
01/18/2016; 7:00 pm, ESPN3		at Stetson	W 61–56	11–7 (2–1)	Edmunds Center (353); DeLand, FL
01/23/2016; 7:00 pm, ESPN3		Jacksonville	L 43–49	11–8 (2–2)	G. B. Hodge Center; Spartanburg, SC
01/26/2016; 7:00 pm, ESPN3		North Florida	W 69–54	12–8 (3–2)	G. B. Hodge Center (176); Spartanburg, SC
01/30/2016; 2:30 pm, ESPN3		at Lipscomb	W 81–54	13–8 (4–2)	Allen Arena (340); Nashville, TN
02/04/2016; 7:00 pm, ESPN3		Kennesaw State	W 66–57	14–8 (5–2)	G. B. Hodge Center (141); Spartanburg, SC
02/06/2016; 3:30 pm, ESPN3		Lipscomb	W 93–71	15–8 (6–2)	G. B. Hodge Center (228); Spartanburg, SC
02/10/2016; 7:00 pm, ESPN3		at Kennesaw State	W 63–51	16–8 (7–2)	KSU Convocation Center (253); Kennesaw, GA
02/13/2016; 4:30 pm, ESPN3		Stetson	W 73–58	17–8 (8–2)	G. B. Hodge Center (142); Spartanburg, SC
02/15/2016; 4:30 pm, ESPN3		Florida Gulf Coast	L 44–56	17–9 (8–3)	G. B. Hodge Center (210); Spartanburg, SC
02/20/2016; 4:30 pm, ESPN3		at North Florida	W 75–61	18–9 (9–3)	UNF Arena (484); Jacksonville, FL
02/22/2016; 7:00 pm, ESPN3		at Jacksonville	L 69–75 ^{OT}	18–10 (9–4)	Swisher Gymnasium (876); Jacksonville, FL
02/27/2016; 2:00 pm, ESPN3		NJIT	W 67–47	19–10 (10–4)	G. B. Hodge Center (168); Spartanburg, SC
Atlantic Sun Women's Tournament
03/04/2016; 7:00 pm, ESPN3		North Florida; Quarterfinals	W 76–50	20–10	G. B. Hodge Center (217); Spartanburg, SC
03/09/2016; 7:00 pm, ESPN3		at Jacksonville; Semifinals	L 56–67	20–11	Swisher Gymnasium (432); Jacksonville, FL
WBI
03/17/2016*; 7:00 pm		at Northern Kentucky; First Round	W 71–69	21–11	BB&T Arena (363); Highland Heights, KY
03/19/2016*; 7:00 pm		Western Illinois; Quarterfinals	W 81–78	22–11	G. B. Hodge Center (172); Spartanburg, SC
03/23/2016*; 9:00 pm		at Weber State; Semifinals	L 53–79	22–12	Dee Events Center (1,323); Ogden, UT
*Non-conference game. ^{#}Rankings from AP Poll. (#) Tournament seedings in parentheses. All times are in Eastern Time.

== See also ==
- 2015–16 USC Upstate Spartans men's basketball team
