= 2015–16 North Florida Ospreys women's basketball team =

Intercollegiate basketball season

2015–16 North Florida Ospreys women's basketball
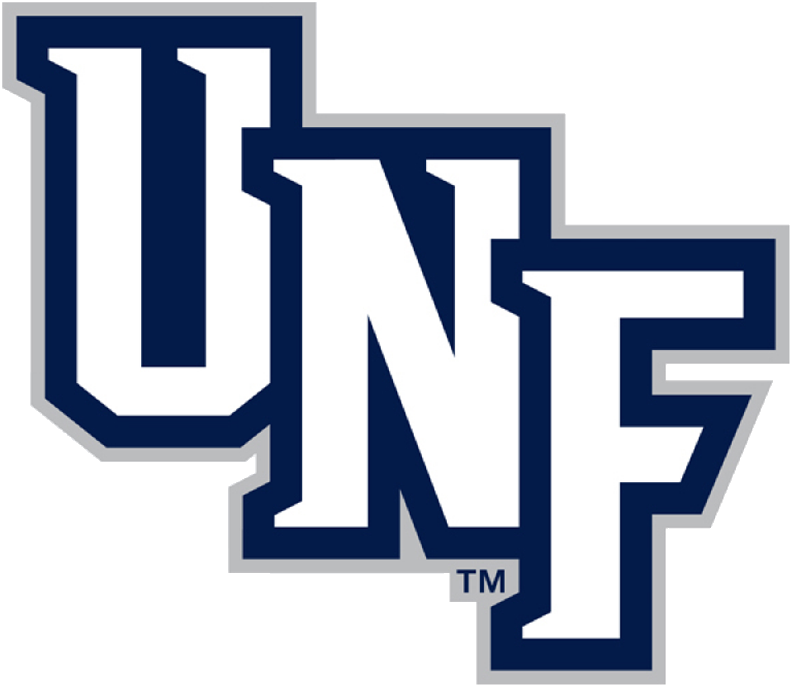
- Conference: Atlantic Sun Conference
- Record: 7–23 (3–11 A-Sun)
- Head coach: Darrick Gibbs (1st season)
- Assistant coaches: David Lowery; Jessica Taylor; MaryLynne Schaefer
- Home arena: UNF Arena

2015–16 Atlantic Sun women's basketball standings
| | Conf. | | | | Overall |
| Team | W | | L | PCT | W | | L | PCT |
|---|---|---|---|---|---|---|---|---|
| Florida Gulf Coast | 14 | – | 0 | 1.000 | 33 | – | 5 | .868 |
| Jacksonville † | 11 | – | 3 | .786 | 22 | – | 11 | .667 |
| USC Upstate | 10 | – | 4 | .714 | 22 | – | 12 | .647 |
| Stetson | 9 | – | 5 | .643 | 20 | – | 12 | .625 |
| Kennesaw State | 6 | – | 8 | .429 | 11 | – | 19 | .367 |
| North Florida | 3 | – | 11 | .214 | 7 | – | 23 | .233 |
| Lipscomb | 2 | – | 12 | .143 | 5 | – | 25 | .167 |
| NJIT | 1 | – | 13 | .071 | 4 | – | 26 | .133 |
† 2016 Atlantic Sun tournament winner As of April 2, 2016; Rankings from AP poll

The 2015–16 North Florida Ospreys women's basketball team represented the University of North Florida in the 2015–16 NCAA Division I women's basketball season. The Ospreys, led by first year head coach Darrick Gibbs, play their games at UNF Arena and were members of the Atlantic Sun Conference. They finished the season 7–23, 3–11 in A-Sun play to finish in sixth place. They lost in the quarterfinals of A-Sun Tournament to USC Upstate.

== Media ==
All home games and conference road games were shown on ESPN3 or A-Sun.TV.

== Roster ==
2015–16 North Florida Ospreys women's basketball team
Players
Coaches

| Pos. | # | Name | Height | Year | Previous school | Hometown |
|---|---|---|---|---|---|---|
| G | 1 | Claire Ioannidis | 5 ft 7 in (1.7 m) | Jr | Shelford Girls' Grammar; Tinidad State JC | Melbourne, Australia |
| G | 2 | Sierra Shepherd | 5 ft 4 in (1.63 m) | So | Ribault | Jacksonville, FL |
| G/F | 5 | Hadley Kiefer | 5 ft 11 in (1.8 m) | Fr | Jerome | Dublin, OH |
| G/F | 10 | Simone Brown (I) (redshirt) | 5 ft 11 in (1.8 m) | Jr | Father Lopez; Liberty | Land O'Lakes, FL |
| G/F | 11 | Taru Madekivi | 5 ft 11 in (1.8 m) | Jr | Aurajoki | Turku, Finland |
| G | 12 | Tesh Hanson (I) (redshirt) | 5 ft 11 in (1.8 m) | Jr | Seffner Christian Academy; Liberty | Tampa, FL |
| F/C | 15 | Karrah Johnson | 6 ft 2 in (1.88 m) | Jr | Lake Highland Prep; Santa Fe College | Orlando, FL |
| F/C | 22 | Katie Meckus | 6 ft 2 in (1.88 m) | Fr | Bishop Denis O'Connell | Potomac Falls, VA |
| G | 23 | Kadesia Johnson | 5 ft 8 in (1.73 m) | Sr | Poinciana; Daytona State College | Alpharetta, GA |
| G/F | 24 | Maiya Rumph | 5 ft 10 in (1.78 m) | So | Sparkman | Madison, AL |
| G/F | 33 | Amber Robinson | 5 ft 10 in (1.78 m) | Jr | Lake Brantley | Altamonte Springs, FL |
| G/F | 34 | Jordan Berenbaum (redshirt) | 6 ft 1 in (1.85 m) | Fr | St. Petersburg | St. Petersburg, FL |

Head coach

- Darrick Gibbs (Wofford)

Assistant coach(es)

- David Lowery (Mississippi State)
- Jessica Taylor (Wofford)
- MaryLynne Schaefer (Hartford)

Legend

- (C) Team captain
- (S) Suspended
- (I) Ineligible
- (W) Walk-on
- Injured
- Current redshirt

Roster

== Schedule ==
| Date time, TV | Rank^{#} | Opponent^{#} | Result | Record | Site (attendance) city, state |
Non-conference regular season
| 11/13/2015*; 2:00 pm | | at UMKC | W 62–55 | 1–0 | Swinney Recreation Center (156); Kansas City, MO |
| 11/16/2015*; 8:00 pm | | at Nebraska | L 46–91 | 1–1 | Pinnacle Bank Arena (4,475); Lincoln, NE |
| 11/19/2015*; 11:00 am, ESPN3 | | Webber International | L 60–72 | 1–2 | UNF Arena (2,443); Jacksonville, FL |
| 11/21/2015*; 3:00 pm, ESPN3 | | Purdue | L 47–70 | 1–3 | UNF Arena (534); Jacksonville, FL |
| 11/24/2015*; 11:00 am, ESPN3 | | at No. 14 Florida State | L 28–80 | 1–4 | Donald L. Tucker Center (3,565); Tallahassee, FL |
| 11/27/2015*; 3:00 pm, ESPN3 | | Bethune-Cookman; UNF Thanksgiving Classic | L 49–53 | 1–5 | UNF Arena (376); Jacksonville, FL |
| 11/28/2015*; 3:00 pm, ESPN3 | | Towson; UNF Thanksgiving Classic | W 74–72 ^{OT} | 2–5 | UNF Arena (354); Jacksonville, FL |
| 12/05/2015*; 2:00 pm, ESPN3 | | at Georgia State | L 63–76 | 2–6 | GSU Sports Arena (408); Atlanta, GA |
| 12/12/2015*; 3:00 pm, ESPN3 | | Trinity Baptist | W 97–30 | 3–6 | UNF Arena (221); Jacksonville, FL |
| 12/14/2015*; 12:30 pm | | at Alabama | L 47–69 | 3–7 | Coleman Coliseum (4,284); Tuscaloosa, AL |
| 12/16/2015*; 5:00 pm, ESPN3 | | Warner | W 60–51 | 4–7 | UNF Arena (171); Jacksonville, FL |
| 12/19/2015*; 3:00 pm, ESPN3 | | South Carolina State; Oceanfront Holiday Classic | L 48–53 | 4–8 | UNF Arena (363); Jacksonville, FL |
| 12/20/2015*; 3:00 pm, ESPN3 | | Campbell; Oceanfront Holiday Classic | L 55–66 | 4–9 | UNF Arena (282); Jacksonville, FL |
| 12/29/2015*; 3:00 pm, ESPN3 | | UNC Wilmington | L 47–63 | 4–10 | UNF Arena (214); Jacksonville, FL |
| 01/02/2016*; 5:00 pm, ESPN3 | | at Mercer | L 54–68 | 4–11 | Hawkins Arena (863); Macon, GA |
Atlantic Sun regular season
| 01/09/2016; 1:00 pm, ESPN3 | | Jacksonville | L 39–73 | 4–12 (0–1) | UNF Arena (729); Jacksonville, FL |
| 01/16/2016; 4:00 pm, ESPN3 | | Kennesaw State | L 55–70 | 4–13 (0–2) | UNF Arena (323); Jacksonville, FL |
| 01/18/2016; 7:00 pm, ESPN3 | | Lipscomb | W 78–70 | 5–13 (1–2) | UNF Arena (308); Jacksonville, FL |
| 01/22/2016; 7:00 pm, ESPN3 | | at NJIT | W 68–51 | 6–13 (2–2) | Fleisher Center (222); Newark, NJ |
| 01/26/2016; 7:00 pm, ESPN3 | | at USC Upstate | L 54–69 | 6–14 (2–3) | G. B. Hodge Center (176); Spartanburg, SC |
| 01/30/2016; 2:00 pm, ESPN3 | | Florida Gulf Coast | L 38–65 | 6–15 (2–4) | UNF Arena (423); Jacksonville, FL |
| 02/04/2016; 7:00 pm, ESPN3 | | at Stetson | L 61–81 | 6–16 (2–5) | Edmunds Center (610); DeLand, FL |
| 02/06/2016; 4:00 pm, ESPN3 | | at Florida Gulf Coast | L 50–75 | 6–17 (2–6) | Alico Arena (1,654); Fort Myers, FL |
| 02/10/2016; 7:00 pm, ESPN3 | | Stetson | L 56–67 | 6–18 (2–7) | UNF Arena (374); Jacksonville, FL |
| 02/13/2016; 2:30 pm, ESPN3 | | at Lipscomb | L 71–78 | 6–19 (2–8) | Allen Arena; Nashville, TN |
| 02/15/2016; 7:00 pm, ESPN3 | | at Kennesaw State | L 54–76 | 6–20 (2–9) | KSU Convocation Center (403); Kennesaw, GA |
| 02/20/2016; 2:00 pm, ESPN3 | | USC Upstate | L 61–75 | 6–21 (2–10) | UNF Arena (484); Jacksonville, FL |
| 02/22/2016; 7:00 pm, ESPN3 | | NJIT | W 72–49 | 7–21 (3–10) | UNF Arena (281); Jacksonville, FL |
| 02/27/2016; 7:00 pm, ESPN3 | | at Jacksonville | L 51–65 | 7–22 (3–11) | Swisher Gymnasium (1,015); Jacksonville, FL |
Atlantic Sun Women's Tournament
| 03/04/2016; 7:00 pm, ESPN3 | | at USC Upstate; Quarterfinals | L 50–76 | 7–23 | G. B. Hodge Center (217); Spartanburg, SC |
*Non-conference game. ^{#}Rankings from AP Poll. (#) Tournament seedings in parentheses. All times are in Eastern Time.

== See also ==
- 2015–16 North Florida Ospreys men's basketball team
