= 2015–16 NJIT Highlanders women's basketball team =

Intercollegiate basketball season

2015–16 NJIT Highlanders women's basketball
- Conference: Atlantic Sun Conference
- Record: 4–26 (1–13 Atlantic Sun)
- Head coach: Steve Lanpher (4th season)
- Assistant coaches: DeAnn Craft; La Kea Jones; Epiphany Smith
- Home arena: Fleisher Center

2015–16 Atlantic Sun women's basketball standings
	Conf.				Overall
Team	W		L	PCT	W		L	PCT
Florida Gulf Coast	14	–	0	1.000	33	–	5	.868
Jacksonville †	11	–	3	.786	22	–	11	.667
USC Upstate	10	–	4	.714	22	–	12	.647
Stetson	9	–	5	.643	20	–	12	.625
Kennesaw State	6	–	8	.429	11	–	19	.367
North Florida	3	–	11	.214	7	–	23	.233
Lipscomb	2	–	12	.143	5	–	25	.167
NJIT	1	–	13	.071	4	–	26	.133
† 2016 Atlantic Sun tournament winner As of April 2, 2016; Rankings from AP poll

The 2015–16 NJIT Highlanders women's basketball team will represents New Jersey Institute of Technology during the 2015–16 NCAA Division I women's basketball season. The Highlanders, led by fourth year head coach Steve Lanpher, play their home games at the Fleisher Center and were first year members of the Atlantic Sun Conference. They finished the season 4–26, 1–13 in A-Sun play to finish in last place. They lost in the quarterfinals of A-Sun Tournament to Florida Gulf Coast.

== Roster ==
2015–16 NJIT Highlanders women's basketball team
Players
Coaches

Pos.	#	Name	Height	Year	Previous school	Hometown
G	0	Kayla Diaz	5 ft 5 in (1.65 m)	Fr	Garrett Morgan Academy	Clifton, NJ
G	1	Alana Dudley	5 ft 9 in (1.75 m)	Jr	Whippany Park	Whippany, NJ
G	10	Ronni Grandison	5 ft 10 in (1.78 m)	RS Sr	Lakota West; UMass	West Chester, OH
G	11	Jordan Ireland	5 ft 7 in (1.7 m)	Fr	Garnet Valley	Garnet Valley, PA
G	12	Olivia Dudley	5 ft 9 in (1.75 m)	Jr	Whippany Park; Stony Brook	Whippany, NJ
G	13	Kelly Guarino	5 ft 9 in (1.75 m)	RS Fr	Albertus Mangus	Thells, NY
G	14	Ruta Vetra	6 ft 0 in (1.83 m)	Jr	Our Lady of Mercy Academy	Jūrmala, Latvia
C	21	Maria Ruban	6 ft 5 in (1.96 m)	RS So	Our Lady of Mercy Academy	Kyiv, Ukraine
G	22	Tatianna Torres	5 ft 10 in (1.78 m)	RS Fr	Thomas A. Edison	Arlington, VA
G	23	Jillian Libby	5 ft 11 in (1.8 m)	Fr	Cheverus	South Portland, ME
G	24	Camerin Spahn	6 ft 0 in (1.83 m)	Jr	Freehold	Freehold, NJ
G	25	Bianca Picard	5 ft 6 in (1.68 m)	So	Souderton	Skippack, PA
F	34	Leah Horton	6 ft 1 in (1.85 m)	RS Jr	Emmaus; Temple	Macungie, PA

Head coach

- Steve Lanpher (St. Joseph)

Assistant coach(es)

- DeAnn Craft (Central Florida)
- La Kea Jones (VCU)
- Epiphany Smith (Saint Anselm)

Legend

- (C) Team captain
- (S) Suspended
- (I) Ineligible
- (W) Walk-on
- Injured
- Current redshirt

Roster

== Schedule ==
Date time, TV	Rank^{#}	Opponent^{#}	Result	Record	Site (attendance) city, state
Non-conference regular season
11/16/2015*; 7:00 pm		at Binghamton	L 50–54	0–1	Binghamton University Events Center (1,374); Vestal, NY
11/19/2015*; 5:00 pm		Lehigh	L 47–75	0–2	Fleisher Center (606); Newark, NJ
11/22/2015*; 1:00 pm		at Marshall	L 50–63	0–3	Cam Henderson Center (384); Huntington, WV
11/24/2015*; 7:00 pm		St. Joseph's–Brooklyn	W 78–41	1–3	Fleisher Center (355); Newark, NJ
11/28/2015*; 2:00 pm		College of Saint Joseph (VT)	W 71–50	2–3	Fleisher Center (300); Newark, NJ
12/02/2015*; 5:00 pm		at Wagner	L 53–76	2–4	Spiro Sports Center (N/A); Staten Island, NY
12/05/2015*; 7:00 pm		at Virginia	L 54–81	2–5	John Paul Jones Arena (3,268); Charlottesville, VA
12/09/2015*; 7:00 pm		at LIU Brooklyn	W 53–44	3–5	Steinberg Wellness Center (150); Brooklyn, NY
12/11/2015*; 7:00 pm		Army	L 35–71	3–6	Fleisher Center (150); Newark, NJ
12/20/2015*; 2:00 pm		Vermont	L 46–54	3–7	Fleisher Center (N/A); Newark, NJ
12/22/2015*; 12:00 pm		North Dakota State	L 59–64	3–8	Fleisher Center (332); Newark, NJ
12/28/2015*; 8:00 pm		at Minnesota	L 50–83	3–9	Williams Arena (2,772); Minneapolis, MN
12/31/2015*; 2:00 pm		Dartmouth	L 39–46	3–10	Fleisher Center (400); Newark, NJ
01/04/2016*; 2:00 pm		Brown	L 49–74	3–11	Fleisher Center (202); Newark, NJ
Atlantic Sun regular season
01/09/2016; 1:00 pm, ESPN3		USC Upstate	L 41–58	3–12 (0–1)	Fleisher Center (202); Newark, NJ
01/11/2016*; 7:00 pm		at Columbia	L 52–72	3–13	Levien Gymnasium (236); New York City, NY
01/16/2016; 1:00 pm, ESPN3		at Stetson	L 55–60	3–14 (0–2)	Edmunds Center (316); DeLand, FL
01/18/2016; 7:00 pm, ESPN3		at Florida Gulf Coast	L 37–70	3–15 (0–3)	Alico Arena (1,482); Fort Myers, FL
01/22/2016; 7:00 pm, ESPN3		North Florida	L 51–68	3–16 (0–4)	Fleisher Center (222); Newark, NJ
01/26/2016; 7:00 pm, ESPN3		Jacksonville	L 36–65	3–17 (0–5)	Fleisher Center (335); Newark, NJ
01/30/2016; 2:00 pm, ESPN3		at Kennesaw State	L 48–64	3–18 (0–6)	KSU Convocation Center (755); Kennesaw, GA
02/04/2016; 7:00 pm, ESPN3		Lipscomb	W 61–51	4–18 (1–6)	Fleisher Center (355); Newark, NJ
02/06/2016; 1:00 pm, ESPN3		Kennesaw State	L 77–82	4–19 (1–7)	Fleisher Center (275); Newark, NJ
02/10/2016; 7:30 pm, ESPN3		at Lipscomb	L 49–63	4–20 (1–8)	Allen Arena (44); Nashville, TN
02/13/2016; 1:00 pm, ESPN3		Florida Gulf Coast	L 32–53	4–21 (1–9)	Fleisher Center (500); Newark, NJ
02/15/2016; 7:00 pm, ESPN3		Stetson	L 56–74	4–22 (1–10)	Fleisher Center (400); Newark, NJ
02/20/2016; 1:00 pm, ESPN3		at Jacksonville	L 37–68	4–23 (1–10)	Swisher Gymnasium (152); Jacksonville, FL
02/22/2016; 7:00 pm, ESPN3		at North Florida	L 49–72	4–24 (1–11)	UNF Arena (281); Jacksonville, FL
02/27/2016; 2:00 pm, ESPN3		at USC Upstate	L 47–67	4–25 (1–12)	G. B. Hodge Center (168); Spartanburg, SC
Atlantic Sun Women's Tournament
03/04/2016; 7:00 pm, ESPN3		at Florida Gulf Coast; Quarterfinals	L 31–60	4–26	Alico Arena (1,284); Fort Myers, FL
*Non-conference game. ^{#}Rankings from AP Poll. (#) Tournament seedings in parentheses. All times are in Eastern Time.

== See also ==
- 2015–16 NJIT Highlanders men's basketball team
