= 2015–16 Kennesaw State Owls women's basketball team =

Intercollegiate basketball season

2015–16 Kennesaw State Owls women's basketball
- Conference: Atlantic Sun Conference
- Record: 11–19 (6–8 ASUN)
- Head coach: Nitra Perry (4th season)
- Assistant coaches: Nicci Kelly; Stacy Franklin; Janie Mitchell
- Home arena: KSU Convocation Center

2015–16 Atlantic Sun women's basketball standings
	Conf.				Overall
Team	W		L	PCT	W		L	PCT
Florida Gulf Coast	14	–	0	1.000	33	–	5	.868
Jacksonville †	11	–	3	.786	22	–	11	.667
USC Upstate	10	–	4	.714	22	–	12	.647
Stetson	9	–	5	.643	20	–	12	.625
Kennesaw State	6	–	8	.429	11	–	19	.367
North Florida	3	–	11	.214	7	–	23	.233
Lipscomb	2	–	12	.143	5	–	25	.167
NJIT	1	–	13	.071	4	–	26	.133
† 2016 Atlantic Sun tournament winner As of April 2, 2016; Rankings from AP poll

The 2015–16 Kennesaw State Owls women's basketball team represented Kennesaw State University during the 2015–16 NCAA Division I women's basketball season. The Owls, led by fourth-year head coach Nitra Perry, played their home games at the KSU Convocation Center, in Kennesaw, Georgia and were members of the Atlantic Sun Conference (ASUN). They finished the season 11–19, 6–8 in ASUN play, to finish in fifth place. They lost in the quarterfinals of ASUN tournament to Stetson.

On March 7, head coach Nitra Perry's contract was not renewed. She finished a four-year record at Kennesaw State of 41–80.

== Roster ==
2015–16 Kennesaw State Owls women's basketball team
Players
Coaches

Pos.	#	Name	Height	Year	Hometown
C	1	Alexis Jean	6 ft 1 in (1.85 m)	Fr	Port Saint Lucie, FL
G	2	Karly Frye	5 ft 4 in (1.63 m)	Sr	Chuckey, TN
F	4	Kelly Dulkoski	5 ft 8 in (1.73 m)	RS So	China Grove, NC
G	10	Tayler Smith	5 ft 11 in (1.8 m)	Fr	Sebastian, FL
G	11	Clara Young	5 ft 8 in (1.73 m)	RS So	Woodstock, GA
G/F	12	Alexandra Landby	6 ft 2 in (1.88 m)	Fr	Stockholm, Sweden
F	22	Allison Johnson	6 ft 0 in (1.83 m)	Fr	Norcross, GA
G	23	Deja McPhee	5 ft 9 in (1.75 m)	Jr	Gainesville, FL
G	24	Iceis Walker	5 ft 7 in (1.7 m)	Fr	Lawrenceville, GA
F	25	Katie Polinsky	6 ft 2 in (1.88 m)	So	Gainesville, FL
F	30	Aaereon Smith	5 ft 9 in (1.75 m)	Jr	Louisville, KY
F	31	Chloe Branch	5 ft 11 in (1.8 m)	RS So	Fayetteville, GA
G	44	Deandrea Sawyers	5 ft 8 in (1.73 m)	Jr	Nashville, TN
C	45	Jasmine McAllister	6 ft 1 in (1.85 m)	Sr	Memphis, TN

Head coach

- Nitra Perry (Mississippi State)

Assistant coach(es)

- Stacy Franklin (Alabama)
- Janie Mitchell (Georgia Tech)
- Nicci Kelly (LSU)

Legend

- (C) Team captain
- (S) Suspended
- (I) Ineligible
- (W) Walk-on
- Injured
- Current redshirt

Roster
Last update: June 10, 2024

== Schedule ==
Date time, TV	Rank^{#}	Opponent^{#}	Result	Record	Site (attendance) city, state
Exhibition
11/08/2015*; 2:00 p.m., ESPN3		Emory	W 63–46		KSU Convocation Center (250); Kennesaw, GA
Non-conference regular season
11/13/2015*; 7:00 p.m., ESPN3		Georgia State	L 62–66	0–1	KSU Convocation Center (704); Kennesaw, GA
11/16/2015*; 7:00 p.m., ESPN3		Presbyterian	W 49–47	1–1	KSU Convocation Center (349); Kennesaw, GA
11/19/2015*; 7:30 p.m.		at Jacksonville State	L 52–61	1–2	Pete Mathews Coliseum (533); Jacksonville, AL
11/21/2015*; 4:00 p.m.		at Florida	L 57–84	1–3	O'Connell Center (1,129); Gainesville, FL
11/24/2015*; 7:00 p.m.		at Florida A&M	L 67–69 ^{OT}	1–4	Teaching Gym (278); Tallahassee, FL
11/28/2015*; 4:30 p.m., ESPN3		Western Carolina; KSU Thanksgiving Classic	W 65–53	2–4	KSU Convocation Center (754); Kennesaw, GA
11/29/2015*; 4:30 p.m., ESPN3		New Orleans; KSU Thanksgiving Classic	W 60–53	3–4	KSU Convocation Center (457); Kennesaw, GA
12/03/2015*; 7:00 p.m.		at Georgia	L 34–89	3–5	Stegeman Coliseum (1,622); Athens, GA
12/05/2015*; 2:00 p.m., ESPN3		Mercer	L 61–72	3–6	KSU Convocation Center (327); Kennesaw, GA
12/12/2015*; 2:00 p.m., ESPN3		Austin Peay	W 73–65	4–6	KSU Convocation Center (317); Kennesaw, GA
12/15/2015*; 7:00 p.m.		at Gardner Webb	L 56–70	4–7	Paul Porter Arena (117); Boiling Springs, NC
12/19/2015*; 12:00 p.m.		at Morehead State	L 77–83	4–8	Ellis Johnson Arena (610); Morehead, KY
12/21/2015*; 2:00 p.m.		at Xavier	L 59–62	4–9	Cintas Center (654); Cincinnati, OH
12/29/2015*; 2:00 p.m., ESPN3		Thomas University (GA)	W 70–41	5–9	KSU Convocation Center (217); Kennesaw, GA
01/02/2016*; 2:00 p.m.		at Wofford	L 59–70	5–10	Benjamin Johnson Arena (241); Spartanburg, SC
Atlantic Sun Conference season
01/09/2016; 2:00 p.m., ESPN3		Lipscomb	W 55–54	6–10 (1–0)	KSU Convocation Center (612); Kennesaw, GA
01/16/2016; 4:00 p.m., ESPN3		at North Florida	W 70–55	7–10 (2–0)	UNF Arena (323); Jacksonville, FL
01/18/2016; 7:00 p.m., ESPN3		at Jacksonville	L 63–76	7–11 (2–1)	Swisher Gymnasium (457); Jacksonville, FL
01/23/2015; 2:00 p.m., ESPN3		Stetson	L 54–57	7–12 (2–2)	KSU Convocation Center (420); Kennesaw, GA
01/26/2015; 2:00 p.m., ESPN3		Florida Gulf Coast	L 47–78	7–13 (2–3)	KSU Convocation Center (173); Kennesaw, GA
01/30/2015; 2:00 p.m., ESPN3		NJIT	W 64–48	8–13 (3–3)	KSU Convocation Center (755); Kennesaw, GA
02/04/2016; 7:00 p.m., ESPN3		at USC Upstate	L 57–66	8–14 (3–4)	G.B. Hodge Center (141); Spartanburg, SC
02/06/2016; 1:00 p.m., ESPN3		at NJIT	W 82–77	9–14 (4–4)	Fleisher Center (275); Newark, NJ
02/10/2015; 7:00 p.m., ESPN3		USC Upstate	L 53–61	9–15 (4–5)	KSU Convocation Center (253); Kennesaw, GA
02/13/2015; 2:00 p.m., ESPN3		Jacksonville	L 42–67	9–16 (4–6)	KSU Convocation Center (576); Kennesaw, GA
02/15/2015; 7:00 p.m., ESPN3		North Florida	W 76–54	10–16 (5–6)	KSU Convocation Center (403); Kennesaw, GA
02/20/2016; 4:00 p.m., ESPN3		at Florida Gulf Coast	L 41–63	10–17 (5–7)	Alico Arena (2,367); Fort Myers, FL
02/23/2016; 5:30 p.m., ESPN3		at Stetson	L 62–77	10–18 (5–8)	Edmunds Center (878); DeLand, FL
02/27/2016; 5:00 p.m., ESPN3		at Lipscomb	W 68–64	11–18 (6–8)	Allen Arena; Nashville, TN
ASUN women's tournament
03/04/2016; 7:00 p.m., ESPN3		at Stetson; Quarterfinals	L 56–74	11–19	Edmunds Center (415); DeLand, FL
*Non-conference game. ^{#}Rankings from AP poll. (#) Tournament seedings in parentheses. All times are in Eastern.

== See also ==
- 2015–16 Kennesaw State Owls men's basketball team
