= Stetson Hatters women's basketball =

2026–27 Stetson Hatters women's basketball team
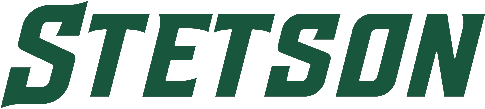
- University: Stetson University
- Head coach: Melissa DeVore (1st season)
- Location: DeLand, Florida
- Arena: Edmunds Center (capacity: 5,000)
- Conference: Atlantic Sun
- Nickname: Hatters
- Colors: Hunter green and white

NCAA Division I tournament appearances
- 2005, 2011, 2013

Conference tournament champions
- 1989, 2005, 2011, 2013

Conference regular-season champions
- 2017

The Stetson Hatters women's basketball team represents Stetson University in DeLand, Florida, United States. The school's team currently competes in the ASUN Conference.

== History ==
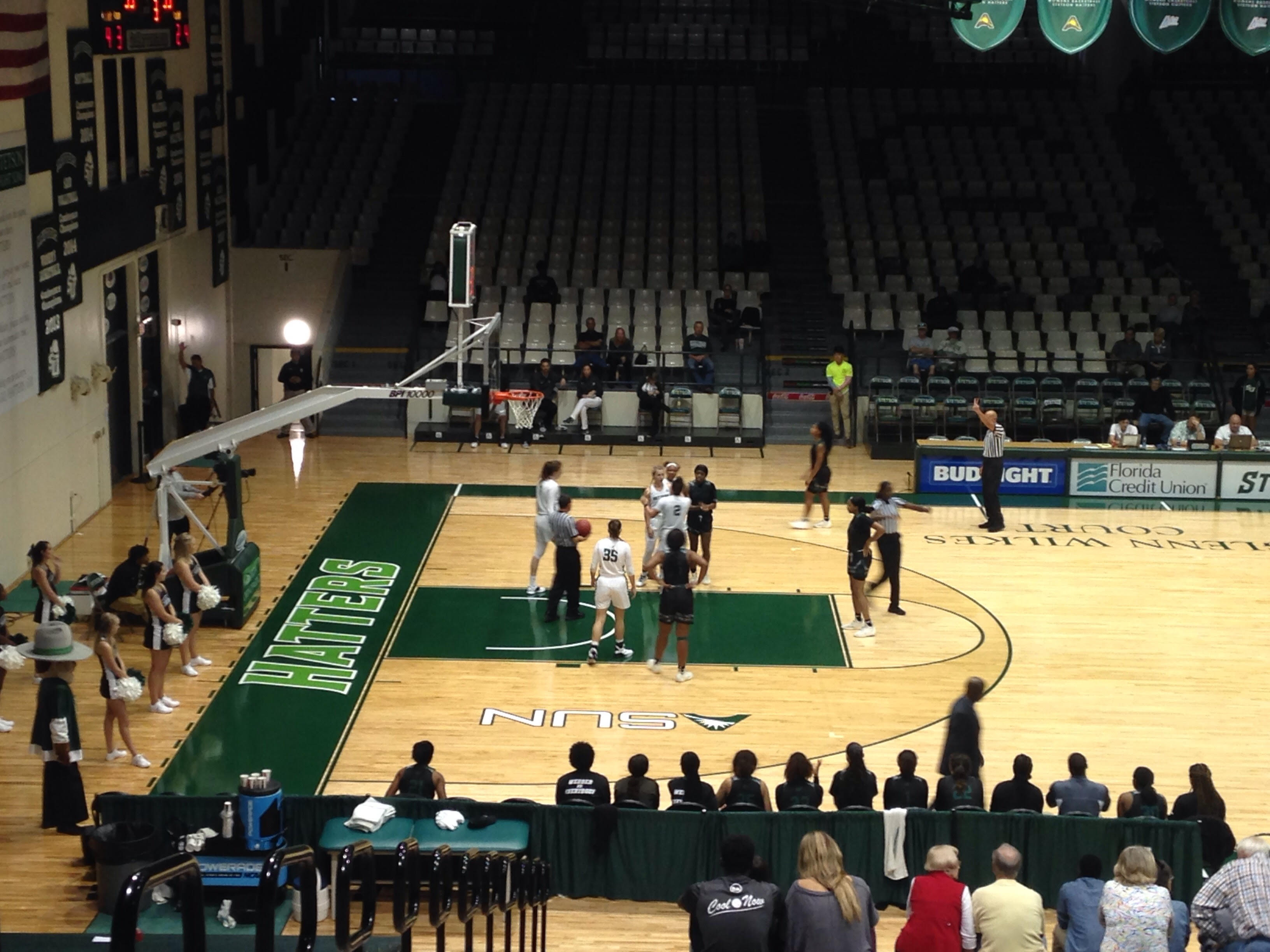
Stetson (white) taking on Webber International (black) during a November 2018 contest.

Stetson played sparingly from 1906 to 1930, playing games against colleges but mostly playing against high school teams. In 1931, the varsity team was discontinued, staying that way until 1946. However, the team was discontinued again in 1948. The modern era began in 1975 with the restoration of the team to varsity level. They joined Division I in 1981. Since joining the Atlantic Sun, they have won the tournament in 1989, 2005, 2011, and 2013, going to the NCAA Tournament in the last three. They have lost in the First Round each time. They have also made appearances in the WNIT in 2012, 2014, 2015, 2017 along with the WBI in 2016. As of the end of the 2015–16 season, the Hatters have an all-time record of 511–645.

== NCAA tournament results ==
Year	Seed	Round	Opponent	Result
2005	#16	First Round	#1 LSU	L 36–70
2011	#16	First Round	#1 Tennessee	L 34–99
2013	#14	First Round	#3 UCLA	L 49–66
