= 2015–16 DePaul Blue Demons women's basketball team =

Intercollegiate basketball season

2015–16 DePaul Blue Demons women's basketball
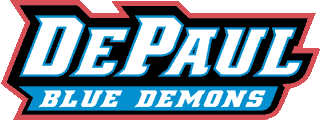

Big East Regular Season Champions

NCAA Women's Tournament, Sweet Sixteen
- Conference: Big East Conference

Ranking
- Coaches: No. 17
- AP: No. 20
- Record: 27–9 (16–2 Big East)
- Head coach: Doug Bruno (30th season)
- Assistant coaches: Candis Blankson; Bart Brooks; Jill M. Pizzotti
- Home arena: McGrath-Phillips Arena

2015–16 Big East Conference women's basketball standings
	Conf.				Overall
Team	W		L	PCT	W		L	PCT
No. 20 DePaul*	16	–	2	.889	27	–	9	.750
Seton Hall	12	–	6	.667	23	–	9	.719
Villanova	12	–	6	.667	20	–	12	.625
St. John's †	11	–	7	.611	23	–	10	.697
Georgetown	9	–	9	.500	16	–	14	.533
Marquette	9	–	9	.500	14	–	16	.467
Xavier	8	–	10	.444	17	–	13	.567
Creighton	8	–	10	.444	17	–	18	.486
Butler	4	–	14	.222	10	–	21	.323
Providence	1	–	17	.056	5	–	24	.172
† 2016 Big East Basketball Tournament winner * Tournament #1 seed As of March 26, 2016; Rankings from AP poll

The 2015–16 DePaul Blue Demons women's basketball team represented DePaul University during the 2015–16 NCAA Division I women's basketball season. The Blue Demons, led by thirtieth year head coach Doug Bruno, played their home games at the McGrath-Phillips Arena. They were members of the new Big East Conference. They finished the season 27–9, 16–2 in Big East play to win the Big East regular season title. They advanced to the semifinals of the Big East women's tournament, where they lost to St. John's. They received an at-large bid to the NCAA women's basketball tournament, where they defeated James Madison in the first round, Louisville in the second round before losing to Oregon State in the sweet sixteen.

== Previous season ==
The Blue Devils finished the 2014–15 season 27–8, 15–3 in Big East play to share the regular season title with Seton Hall. They also won the Big East tournament to earn an automatic trip to the 2015 NCAA Division I women's basketball tournament, where they lost to Notre Dame in the second round.

== Roster ==
2015–16 DePaul Blue Demons women's basketball team
Players
Coaches

Pos.	#	Name	Height	Year	Previous school	Hometown
G	1	Ashton Millender	5 ft 8 in (1.73 m)	So	Marian Catholic	Glenwood, IL
F	4	Meri Bennett-Swanson	6 ft 3 in (1.91 m)	RS So	Vernon Hills	Vernon Hills, IL
G	10	Amarah Coleman	5 ft 11 in (1.8 m)	So	Homewood-Flossmoor	Bolingbrook, IL
G	13	Chanise Jenkins	5 ft 5 in (1.65 m)	Sr	Whitney Young	Chicago, IL
G	14	Jessica January	5 ft 7 in (1.7 m)	Jr	Richfield	Richfield, MN
F	15	Elri Liebenberg	6 ft 5 in (1.96 m)	RS Fr	Bergsig Academy	Rustenburg, South Africa
G	22	Brooke Schulte	5 ft 9 in (1.75 m)	Jr	Mater Dei	Germantown, IL
G	23	Centrese McGee	5 ft 7 in (1.7 m)	Sr	Thornton Fractional North	Calumet City, IL
G	24	Tanita Allen	5 ft 10 in (1.78 m)	Fr	Whitney Young	Chicago, IL
G/F	30	Megan Podkowa	6 ft 2 in (1.88 m)	Sr	Trinity	Glenwood, IL
F	34	Jacqui Grant	6 ft 3 in (1.91 m)	Jr	Maine South	Park Ridge, IL
F	35	Mart'e Grays	6 ft 2 in (1.88 m)	So	Martin Luther King Jr.	Detroit, MI
F	44	Brandi Harvey-Carr	6 ft 4 in (1.93 m)	Jr	Leap Academy	Camden, NJ
G	45	Meghan Waldron	5 ft 11 in (1.8 m)	RS Fr	Wheaton Warrenville South	Wheaton, IL

Head coach

- Doug Bruno (DePaul)

Assistant coach(es)

- Jill M. Pizzotti (Southeast Missouri State)
- Candis Blankson (DePaul)
- Bart Brooks (Dickinson State)

Legend

- (C) Team captain
- (S) Suspended
- (I) Ineligible
- (W) Walk-on
- Injured
- Current redshirt

Roster
Last update: October 31, 2015

== Schedule ==
Date time, TV	Rank^{#}	Opponent^{#}	Result	Record	Site (attendance) city, state
Exhibition
November 2, 2015*; 7:00 pm		St. Xavier	W 135–64		McGrath-Phillips Arena (370); Chicago, IL
November 7, 2015*; 3:30 pm		Lewis University	W 87–67		McGrath-Phillips Arena (1,230); Chicago, IL
Non-conference regular season
November 13, 2015*; 7:00 pm		Southern Illinois; Preseason WNIT First Round	W 105–61	1–0	McGrath-Phillips Arena (2,753); Chicago, IL
November 15, 2015*; 4:00 pm		St. Bonaventure; Preseason WNIT Second Round	W 77–54	2–0	McGrath-Phillips Arena (2,308); Chicago, IL
November 19, 2015*; 7:00 pm		Indiana; Preseason WNIT Semifinals	W 84–69	3–0	McGrath-Phillips Arena (1,924); Chicago, IL
November 22, 2015*; 2:00 pm, CBSSN		at No. 5 Baylor; Preseason WNIT Championship Game	L 72–86	3–1	Ferrell Center (5,637); Waco, TX
November 24, 2015*; 7:00 pm		Chicago State	W 88–42	4–1	McGrath-Phillips Arena (1,989); Chicago, IL
November 27, 2015*; 7:00 pm		Colgate	W 96–46	5–1	McGrath-Phillips Arena (2,115); Chicago, IL
December 2, 2015*; 6:30 pm, FS1	No. 23	No. 1 Connecticut	L 70–86	5–2	McGrath-Phillips Arena (4,001); Chicago, IL
December 5, 2015*; 7:00 pm	No. 23	Illinois State	W 89–41	6–2	McGrath-Phillips Arena (2,422); Chicago, IL
December 9, 2015*; 6:00 pm, ESPN3	No. 18	at No. 3 Notre Dame	L 90–95	6–3	Edmund P. Joyce Center (8,207); Notre Dame, IN
December 12, 2015*; 2:00 pm, SECN	No. 18	at No. 15 Texas A&M	W 80–66	7–3	Reed Arena (3,721); College Station, TX
December 15, 2015*; 7:00 pm	No. 16	at South Dakota State	L 79–88	7–4	Frost Arena (1,621); Brookings, SD
December 19, 2015*; 5:00 pm	No. 16	at No. 12 Northwestern	W 77–64	8–4	Welsh-Ryan Arena (1,744); Evanston, IL
December 21, 2015*; 12:00 pm	No. 17	Loyola-Chicago	L 75–88	8–5	McGrath-Phillips Arena (2,153); Chicago, IL
Conference regular season
December 29, 2015; 7:00 pm, BEDN/CSNCH+	No. 25	Marquette	W 91–86	9–5 (1–0)	McGrath-Phillips Arena (2,206); Chicago, IL
January 3, 2016; 4:00 pm, CBSSN	No. 25	at St. John's	W 71–61	10–5 (2–0)	Carnesecca Arena (660); Queens, NY
January 5, 2016; 6:00 pm, FS2	No. 24	at No. 25 Seton Hall	W 86–74	11–5 (3–0)	Walsh Gymnasium (851); South Orange, NJ
January 8, 2016; 7:00 pm, BEDN/CSNCH+	No. 24	Georgetown	W 75–53	12–5 (4–0)	McGrath-Phillips Arena (2,201); Chicago, IL
January 10, 2016; 3:00 pm, CBSSN	No. 24	Villanova	L 60–64	12–6 (4–1)	McGrath-Phillips Arena (2,044); Chicago, IL
January 15, 2016; 6:00 pm, FS1		at Butler	W 61–54	13–6 (5–1)	Hinkle Fieldhouse (1,320); Indianapolis, IN
January 17, 2016; 1:00 pm, BEDN		at Xavier	W 70–53	14–6 (6–1)	Cintas Center (1,384); Cincinnati, OH
January 22, 2016; 7:00 pm, BEDN	No. 24	Creighton	W 81–63	15–6 (7–1)	McGrath-Phillips Arena (2,042); Chicago, IL
January 24, 2016; 2:00 pm, BEDN	No. 24	Providence	W 96–50	16–6 (8–1)	McGrath-Phillips Arena (2,022); Chicago, IL
January 29, 2016; 12:00 pm, BEDN/CSNCH	No. 23	Seton Hall	L 74–83	16–7 (8–2)	McGrath-Phillips Arena (3,001); Chicago, IL
January 31, 2016; 12:00 pm, FS2	No. 23	St. John's	W 77–71	17–7 (9–2)	McGrath-Phillips Arena (2,812); Chicago, IL
February 5, 2016; 6:00 pm, BEDN		at Villanova	W 75–47	18–7 (10–2)	The Pavilion (641); Villanova, PA
February 7, 2016; 11:00 am, BEDN		at Georgetown	W 80–66	19–7 (11–2)	McDonough Gymnasium (438); Washington, D.C.
February 12, 2016; 7:00 pm, BEDN	No. 23	Xavier	W 82–52	20–7 (12–2)	McGrath-Phillips Arena (2,352); Chicago, IL
February 14, 2016; 2:00 pm, BEDN/CSNCH	No. 23	Butler	W 102–63	21–7 (13–2)	McGrath-Phillips Arena (2,409); Chicago, IL
February 19, 2016; 6:00 pm, BEDN	No. 21	at Providence	W 91–68	22–7 (14–2)	Alumni Hall (211); Providence, RI
February 21, 2016; 1:00 pm, FS1	No. 21	at Creighton	W 78–52	23–7 (15–2)	D. J. Sokol Arena (1,255); Omaha, NE
February 27, 2016; 5:00 pm, BEDN	No. 19	at Marquette	W 98–65	24–7 (16–2)	Al McGuire Center (2,039); Milwaukee, WI
Big East Women's Tournament
March 6, 2016; 6:00 pm, FS2	No. 18	Butler; Quarterfinals	W 65–52	25–7	McGrath-Phillips Arena; Chicago, IL
March 7, 2016; 5:30 pm, FS1	No. 18	St. John's; Semifinals	L 66–75	25–8	McGrath-Phillips Arena (2,131); Chicago, IL
NCAA Women's Tournament
March 18, 2016*; 11:00 am, ESPN2	(6 D) No. 20	vs. (11 D) James Madison; First Round	W 97–67	26–8	KFC Yum! Center; Louisville, KY
March 20, 2016*; 1:30 pm, ESPN2	(6 D) No. 20	at (3 D) No. 8 Louisville; Second Round	W 73–72	27–8	KFC Yum! Center (7,515); Louisville, KY
March 26, 2016*; 5:00 pm, ESPN	(6 D) No. 20	vs. (2 D) No. 6 Oregon State; Sweet Sixteen	L 71–83	27–9	American Airlines Center (7,109); Dallas, TX
*Non-conference game. ^{#}Rankings from AP Poll. (#) Tournament seedings in parentheses. D=Dallas Region. All times are in Central Time.

== Rankings ==
Ranking movement Legend: ██ Increase in ranking. ██ Decrease in ranking. ██ Not ranked the previous week. RV=Received votes.
Poll	Pre- Season	Week 2	Week 3	Week 4	Week 5	Week 6	Week 7	Week 8	Week 9	Week 10	Week 11	Week 12	Week 13	Week 14	Week 15	Week 16	Week 17	Week 18	Week 19	Final
AP	RV	RV	RV	23	18	16	17	25	24	RV	24	23	RV	23	21	19	18	18	20	N/A
Coaches	22	19	20	18	17	15	23	24	24	25т	21	21	24	23	19	19	18	21	21	17
