= 2015–16 St. John's Red Storm women's basketball team =

Intercollegiate basketball season

2015–16 St. John's Red Storm women's basketball

Big East tournament Champions

NCAA Women's Tournament, first round
- Conference: Big East Conference
- Record: 23–10 (11–7 Big East)
- Head coach: Joe Tartamella (4th season)
- Assistant coaches: Tasha Pointer; Jonath Nicholas; Da'Shena Stevens
- Home arena: Carnesecca Arena

2015–16 Big East Conference women's basketball standings
	Conf.				Overall
Team	W		L	PCT	W		L	PCT
No. 20 DePaul*	16	–	2	.889	27	–	9	.750
Seton Hall	12	–	6	.667	23	–	9	.719
Villanova	12	–	6	.667	20	–	12	.625
St. John's †	11	–	7	.611	23	–	10	.697
Georgetown	9	–	9	.500	16	–	14	.533
Marquette	9	–	9	.500	14	–	16	.467
Xavier	8	–	10	.444	17	–	13	.567
Creighton	8	–	10	.444	17	–	18	.486
Butler	4	–	14	.222	10	–	21	.323
Providence	1	–	17	.056	5	–	24	.172
† 2016 Big East Basketball Tournament winner * Tournament #1 seed As of March 26, 2016; Rankings from AP poll

The 2015–16 St. John's Red Storm women's basketball team represented St. John's University during the 2015–16 NCAA Division I women's basketball season. The Red Storm, led by fourth-year head coach Joe Tartamella, played their games at Carnesecca Arena and were members of the Big East Conference. They finished the season 23–10, 11–7 in Big East play to finish in fourth place. They won the Big East tournament title for the first time since 1988 and earn an automatic trip to the NCAA women's tournament where they lost to Auburn in the first round.

== Roster ==
2015–16 St. John's Red Storm women's basketball team
Players
Coaches

Pos.	#	Name	Height	Year	Previous school	Hometown
G	1	Tamesha Alexander	5 ft 7 in (1.7 m)	So	The Shipley School	Philadelphia, PA
G	3	Aliyyah Handford	5 ft 9 in (1.75 m)	Jr	Shabazz	Newark, NJ
G	4	Aaliyah Lewis	5 ft 5 in (1.65 m)	Jr	Bishop Ford	Staten Island, NY
G	5	Kimberly Spruill (W)	5 ft 9 in (1.75 m)	Jr	Needham B. Broughton	Raleigh, NC
G	15	Danaejah Grant	5 ft 9 in (1.75 m)	Sr	Piscataway; Clemson	Piscataway, NJ
G/F	20	Akina Wellere	5 ft 11 in (1.8 m)	Fr	Gwendolyn Brooks College Preparatory Academy	Chicago, IL
F	23	Jordan Agustus	6 ft 1 in (1.85 m)	Fr	St. Mary's	Bronx, NY
F	24	Jade Walker	6 ft 1 in (1.85 m)	Jr	DePaul Catholic	Maplewood, NJ
F	33	Sandra Udobi	6 ft 2 in (1.88 m)	RS Jr	Life Center Academy	Delta State, Nigeria
F	35	Imani Littleton	6 ft 3 in (1.91 m)	Fr	The Bishop's School	San Diego, CA

Head coach

- Joe Tartamella (James Madison)

Assistant coach(es)

- Tasha Pointer (Rutgers)
- Jonath Nicholas (Trinity (TX))
- Da'Shena Stevens (St. John's)

Legend

- (C) Team captain
- (S) Suspended
- (I) Ineligible
- (W) Walk-on
- Injured
- Current redshirt

Roster

== Schedule ==
Date time, TV	Rank^{#}	Opponent^{#}	Result	Record	Site (attendance) city, state
Non-conference regular season
11/13/2015*; 8:00 pm		at UCLA	L 58–73	0–1	Pauley Pavilion (6,674); Los Angeles, CA
11/15/2015*; 5:00 pm		at UC Irvine	W 85–63	1–1	Bren Events Center (331); Irvine, CA
11/19/2015*; 7:00 pm		at Rutgers	W 69–62	2–1	Louis Brown Athletic Center (2,226); Piscataway, NJ
11/22/2015*; 7:00 pm, ESPN3		Marist	W 61–47	3–1	Carnesecca Arena (611); Queens, NY
11/29/2015*; 2:00 pm, FS2		No. 18 South Florida	W 74–70	3–2	Carnesecca Arena (535); Queens, NY
12/03/2015*; 7:00 pm, ESPN3		Sacred Heart	W 67–54	4–2	Carnesecca Arena (781); Queens, NY
12/06/2015*; 2:00 pm, ESPN3		at Kansas	W 86–71	6–1	Allen Fieldhouse (2,476); Lawrence, KS
12/09/2015*; 7:00 pm, ESPN3		Yale	W 69–56	7–1	Carnesecca Arena (5,602); Queens, NY
12/13/2015*; 2:00 pm		at UCF	W 70–42	8–1	CFE Arena (1,328); Orlando, FL
12/19/2015*; 4:30 pm	No. 25	at Duquesne	L 57–76	8–2	Palumbo Center (402); Pittsburgh, PA
12/22/2015*; 2:00 pm, ESPN3		Fairfield	W 73–54	9–2	Carnesecca Arena (408); Queens, NY
Big East regular season
12/29/2015; 7:00 pm, FS2		at Creighton	W 66–55	10–2 (1–0)	D. J. Sokol Arena (1,563); Omaha, NE
12/31/2015; 1:00 pm, BEDN		at Providence	W 80–61	11–2 (2–0)	Alumni Hall (257); Providence, RI
01/03/2016; 5:00 pm, CBSSN		No. 25 DePaul	L 61–71	11–3 (2–1)	Carnesecca Arena (660); Queens, NY
01/05/2016; 7:00 pm, BEDN		Marquette	W 81–77 ^{OT}	12–3 (3–1)	Carnesecca Arena (448); Queens, NY
01/09/2016; 2:00 pm, BEDN		No. 25 Seton Hall	W 71–69	13–3 (4–1)	Carnesecca Arena; Queens, NY
01/15/2016; 12:00 pm, BEDN		at Georgetown	W 65–60	14–3 (5–1)	McDonough Gymnasium (733); Washington, D.C.
01/17/2016; 1:00 pm, BEDN		at Villanova	L 54–58	14–4 (5–2)	The Pavilion (1,059); Villanova, PA
01/22/2016; 7:00 pm, BEDN		Butler	W 68–41	15–4 (6–2)	Carnesecca Arena (805); Queens, NY
01/24/2016; 2:00 pm, BEDN		Xavier	W 57–41	16–4 (7–2)	Carnesecca Arena; Queens, NY
01/29/2016; 8:00 pm, BEDN		at Marquette	L 64–67	16–5 (7–3)	Al McGuire Center (1,131); Milwaukee, WI
01/31/2016; 1:00 pm, FS2		at No. 23 DePaul	L 71–77	16–6 (7–4)	Phillips-McGrath Arena (2,812); Chicago, IL
02/07/2016; 1:30 pm, FS1		at Seton Hall	W 72–64	17–6 (8–4)	Walsh Gymnasium (1,697); South Orange, NJ
02/12/2016; 8:00 pm, FS1		Villanova	L 59–71	17–7 (8–5)	Carnesecca Arena (2,951); Queens, NY
02/14/2016; 2:00 pm, BEDN		Georgetown	W 63–55	18–7 (9–5)	Carnesecca Arena (3,120); Queens, NY
02/19/2016; 7:00 pm, BEDN		at Xavier	W 69–56	19–7 (10–5)	Cintas Center (1,694); Cincinnati, OH
02/21/2016; 2:00 pm, BEDN		at Butler	L 58–62	19–8 (10–6)	Hinkle Fieldhouse (545); Indianapolis, IN
02/26/2016; 11:00 am, BEDN		Providence	W 69–54	20–8 (11–6)	Carnesecca Arena (5,227); Queens, NY
02/28/2016; 3:00 pm, FS2		Creighton	L 57–64	20–9 (11–7)	Carnesecca Arena (1,242); Queens, NY
Big East Women's Tournament
03/06/2016; 9:30 pm, FS2		vs. Georgetown; Quarterfinals	W 65–52	21–9	McGrath-Phillips Arena (2,234); Chicago, IL
03/07/2016; 6:30 pm, FS1		at No. 18 DePaul; Semifinals	W 75–66	22–9	McGrath-Phillips Arena (2,131); Chicago, IL
03/08/2016; 8:00 pm, FS1		vs. Creighton; Championship Game	W 50–37	23–9	McGrath-Phillips Arena (1,620); Chicago, IL
NCAA Women's Tournament
03/18/2016*; 7:30 pm, ESPN2	(8 D)	vs. (9 D) Auburn; First Round	L 57–68	23–10	Ferrell Center (4,990); Waco, TX
*Non-conference game. ^{#}Rankings from AP Poll. (#) Tournament seedings in parentheses. D=Dallas Region. All times are in Eastern Time.

== Rankings ==
2015–16 NCAA Division I women's basketball rankings

Regular season polls
Poll	Pre- Season	Week 2	Week 3	Week 4	Week 5	Week 6	Week 7	Week 8	Week 9	Week 10	Week 11	Week 12	Week 13	Week 14	Week 15	Week 16	Week 17	Week 18	Week 19	Final
AP	RV	NR	NR	RV	RV	25	RV	NR	NR	NR	NR	NR	NR	NR	NR	NR	NR	NR	NR	N/A
Coaches	RV	RV	RV	RV	RV	RV	RV	RV	RV	RV	RV	RV	RV	RV	RV	RV	RV	RV	25т	RV

Legend
	Increase in ranking
	Decrease in ranking
	Not ranked previous week
(RV)	Received Votes

== See also ==
- 2015–16 St. John's Red Storm men's basketball team
