= 2015–16 Villanova Wildcats women's basketball team =

Intercollegiate basketball season

2015–16 Villanova Wildcats women's basketball

Lehigh Christmas City Classic Champions

WNIT, Second Round
- Conference: Big East Conference
- Record: 20–12 (12–6 Big East)
- Head coach: Harry Perretta (38th season)
- Assistant coaches: Joe Mullaney; Laura Kurz; Shanette Lee
- Home arena: The Pavilion

2015–16 Big East Conference women's basketball standings
	Conf.				Overall
Team	W		L	PCT	W		L	PCT
No. 20 DePaul*	16	–	2	.889	27	–	9	.750
Seton Hall	12	–	6	.667	23	–	9	.719
Villanova	12	–	6	.667	20	–	12	.625
St. John's †	11	–	7	.611	23	–	10	.697
Georgetown	9	–	9	.500	16	–	14	.533
Marquette	9	–	9	.500	14	–	16	.467
Xavier	8	–	10	.444	17	–	13	.567
Creighton	8	–	10	.444	17	–	18	.486
Butler	4	–	14	.222	10	–	21	.323
Providence	1	–	17	.056	5	–	24	.172
† 2016 Big East Basketball Tournament winner * Tournament #1 seed As of March 26, 2016; Rankings from AP poll

The 2015–16 Villanova Wildcats women's basketball team represented Villanova University in the 2015–16 NCAA Division I women's basketball season. The Wildcats, led by thirty-eighth year head coach Harry Perretta, played their games at The Pavilion and were members of the Big East Conference. They finished the season 20–12, 12–6 in Big East play to finish in a tie for second place. They lost in the quarterfinals of the Big East women's tournament to Creighton. They were invited to the Women's National Invitation Tournament, where they defeated Liberty in the first round before losing to Bucknell in the second.

== Roster ==
2015–16 Villanova Wildcats women's basketball team
Players
Coaches

Pos.	#	Name	Height	Year	Previous school	Hometown
F	1	Bridget Herlihy	6 ft 2 in (1.88 m)	Fr	Braintree	Braintree, MA
G	2	Alex Louin (W)	6 ft 0 in (1.83 m)	So	Mount St. Joseph Academy	Doylestown, PA
G	4	Karlie Crispin	5 ft 6 in (1.68 m)	Jr	Pitman	Pitman, NJ
G	5	Caroline Coyer	5 ft 10 in (1.78 m)	Sr	Oakton	Oak Hill, VA
G	10	Katherine Coyer	5 ft 11 in (1.8 m)	Sr	Oakton	Oak Hill, VA
G	11	Jordan Dillard	6 ft 0 in (1.83 m)	Jr	Decatur	Conyers, GA
C	12	Megan Quinn	6 ft 2 in (1.88 m)	So	Episcopal Academy	Berwyn, PA
F	20	Kate Brunori	5 ft 10 in (1.78 m)	Sr	Hilton Head Prep	Hilton Head, SC
G/F	21	Jannah Tucker	6 ft 0 in (1.83 m)	So	New Town	Baltimore, MD
G	22	Kendall Burton	5 ft 8 in (1.73 m)	Sr	Newton South	Newton Highlands, MA
F	25	Brandi Teague	6 ft 2 in (1.88 m)	RS Jr	American Heritage	Davie, FL
G	31	Adrianna Hahn	5 ft 6 in (1.68 m)	Fr	Ursuline Academy	Wilmington, DE
F	32	Samantha Wilkes	6 ft 1 in (1.85 m)	Jr	Immaculate Heart Academy	Fair Lawn, NJ
F	35	Kavunaa Edwards	6 ft 0 in (1.83 m)	Sr	Pickerington North	Pickerington, OH
G	45	Grace Stant	6 ft 0 in (1.83 m)	Fr	Rumson Fair Haven	Fair Haven, NJ

Head coach

- Harry Perretta (Lycoming)

Assistant coach(es)

- Joe Mullaney (Providence)
- Laura Kurz (Villanova)
- Shanette Lee (Villanova)

Legend

- (C) Team captain
- (S) Suspended
- (I) Ineligible
- (W) Walk-on
- Injured
- Current redshirt

Roster

== Rankings ==
2015–16 NCAA Division I women's basketball rankings

Regular season polls
Poll	Pre- Season	Week 2	Week 3	Week 4	Week 5	Week 6	Week 7	Week 8	Week 9	Week 10	Week 11	Week 12	Week 13	Week 14	Week 15	Week 16	Week 17	Week 18	Week 19	Final
AP	NR	NR	NR	NR	NR	NR	NR	NR	NR	NR	RV	NR	NR	NR	NR	NR	NR	NR	NR	N/A
Coaches	NR	RV	RV	RV	NR	NR	NR	NR	NR	NR	RV	RV	NR	NR	NR	NR	NR	RV	RV	NR

Legend
	Increase in ranking
	Decrease in ranking
	Not ranked previous week
(RV)	Received Votes

== Schedule ==
Date time, TV	Rank^{#}	Opponent^{#}	Result	Record	Site (attendance) city, state
Exhibition
11/09/2015*; 7:00 pm		Bloomsburg	W 78–51		The Pavilion (409); Villanova, PA
Non-conference regular season
11/13/2015*; 5:00 pm, ESPN3		at NC State	L 64–70	0–1	PNC Arena (1,211); Raleigh, NC
11/16/2015*; 7:00 pm		Loyola (MD)	W 67–55	1–1	The Pavilion (809); Villanova, PA
11/24/2015*; 7:00 pm		Saint Joseph's	W 55–49	2–1	The Pavilion (1,151); Villanova, PA
11/28/2015*; 7:00 pm		vs. Drexel; Lehigh Christmas City Classic semifinals	W 67–55	3–1	Stabler Arena (473); Bethlehem, PA
11/29/2015*; 2:30 pm		at Lehigh; Lehigh Christmas City Classic championship	W 65–44	4–1	Stabler Arena (652); Bethlehem, PA
12/02/2015*; 5:00 pm		at Temple	L 55–61	4–2	McGonigle Hall (725); Philadelphia, PA
12/05/2015*; 7:00 pm		vs. Sacramento State; Cal Classic semifinals	W 78–54	5–2	Haas Pavilion; Berkeley, CA
12/06/2015*; 6:00 pm		vs. Saint Mary's; Cal Classic championship	L 60–67	5–3	Haas Pavilion; Berkeley, CA
12/13/2015*; 2:00 pm		at George Washington	L 70–78	5–4	Charles E. Smith Center (976); Washington, D.C.
12/20/2015*; 1:00 pm		at La Salle	W 67–56	6–4	Tom Gola Arena (278); Philadelphia, PA
Big East regular season
12/29/2015; 7:00 pm, BEDN		at Butler	W 57–45	7–4 (1–0)	Hinkle Fieldhouse (530); Indianapolis, IN
12/31/2015; 2:00 pm, BEDN		at Xavier	L 67–74 ^{OT}	7–5 (1–1)	Cintas Center (918); Cincinnati, OH
01/03/2016; 1:00 pm, BEDN		Providence	W 67–39	8–5 (2–1)	The Pavilion (1,141); Villanova, PA
01/05/2016; 7:00 pm, BEDN		Creighton	L 62–65	8–6 (2–2)	The Pavilion (509); Villanova, PA
01/08/2016; 8:00 pm, BEDN		at Marquette	W 82–75	9–6 (3–2)	Al McGuire Center (1,257); Milwaukee, WI
01/10/2016; 4:00 pm, CBSSN		at No. 24 DePaul	W 64–60	10–6 (4–2)	Phillips-McGrath Arena (2,044); Chicago, IL
01/15/2016; 7:00 pm, BEDN		Seton Hall	W 55–45	11–6 (5–2)	The Pavilion (909); Villanova, PA
01/17/2016; 1:00 pm, BEDN		St. John's	W 58–54	12–6 (6–2)	The Pavilion (1,059); Villanova, PA
01/24/2016; 1:00 pm, FS2		Georgetown	L 51–57	12–7 (6–3)	The Pavilion (335); Villanova, PA
01/26/2016*; 7:00 pm		Penn	W 66–46	13–7	The Pavilion (809); Villanova, PA
01/29/2016; 8:00 pm, FS1		at Creighton	L 48–53	13–8 (6–4)	D. J. Sokol Arena (1,327); Omaha, NE
01/31/2016; 1:00 pm, BEDN		at Providence	W 76–47	14–8 (7–4)	Alumni Hall (352); Providence, RI
02/05/2016; 11:30 am, BEDN		DePaul	L 47–75	14–9 (7–5)	The Pavilion (641); Villanova, PA
02/07/2016; 1:00 pm, BEDN		Marquette	W 81–60	15–9 (8–5)	The Pavilion (1,009); Villanova, PA
02/12/2016; 8:00 pm, FS1		at St. John's	W 71–59	16–9 (9–5)	Carnesecca Arena (2,951); Queens, NY
02/14/2016; 2:00 pm, BEDN		at Seton Hall	L 50–60	16–10 (9–6)	Walsh Gymnasium (1,231); South Orange, NJ
02/21/2016; 12:00 pm, BEDN		at Georgetown	W 63–60	17–10 (10–6)	McDonough Gymnasium (1,109); Washington, D.C.
02/26/2016; 9:00 pm, FS1		Xavier	W 58–55	18–10 (11–6)	The Pavilion (541); Villanova, PA
02/28/2016; 1:00 pm, BEDN		Butler	W 66–46	19–10 (12–6)	The Pavilion (901); Villanova, PA
Big East Women's Tournament
03/06/2016; 1:00 pm, FS2		vs. Creighton; Quarterfinals	L 48–57	19–11	McGrath-Phillips Arena; Chicago, IL
WNIT
03/17/2016*; 7:00 pm		Liberty; First Round	W 67–51	20–11	The Pavilion (305); Villanova, PA
03/19/2016*; 6:00 pm		Hofstra; Second Round	L 74–82	20–12	The Pavilion (327); Villanova, PA
*Non-conference game. ^{#}Rankings from AP Poll. (#) Tournament seedings in parentheses. All times are in Eastern Time.

== See also ==
- 2015–16 Villanova Wildcats men's basketball team
