= 2015–16 Xavier Musketeers women's basketball team =

Intercollegiate basketball season

2015–16 Xavier Musketeers women's basketball
- Conference: Big East Conference
- Record: 17–13 (8–10 Big East)
- Head coach: Brian Neal (5th season)
- Assistant coaches: Kate Achter; Mark Ehlen; Carla D. Morrow
- Home arena: Cintas Center

2015–16 Big East Conference women's basketball standings
	Conf.				Overall
Team	W		L	PCT	W		L	PCT
No. 20 DePaul*	16	–	2	.889	27	–	9	.750
Seton Hall	12	–	6	.667	23	–	9	.719
Villanova	12	–	6	.667	20	–	12	.625
St. John's †	11	–	7	.611	23	–	10	.697
Georgetown	9	–	9	.500	16	–	14	.533
Marquette	9	–	9	.500	14	–	16	.467
Xavier	8	–	10	.444	17	–	13	.567
Creighton	8	–	10	.444	17	–	18	.486
Butler	4	–	14	.222	10	–	21	.323
Providence	1	–	17	.056	5	–	24	.172
† 2016 Big East Basketball Tournament winner * Tournament #1 seed As of March 26, 2016; Rankings from AP poll

The 2015–16 Xavier Musketeers women's basketball team represented Xavier University during the 2015–16 NCAA Division I women's basketball season. The Musketeers, led by fifth-year head coach Brian Neal, they played their games at the Cintas Center and were third year members of the newly reorganized Big East Conference. They finished the season 17–13, 8–10 in Big East play to finish in a tie for seventh place. They lost in the first round of the Big East women's tournament to Butler.

== Roster ==
2015–16 Xavier Musketeers women's basketball team
Players
Coaches

Pos.	#	Name	Height	Year	Previous school	Hometown
G	0	Marquia Turner	5 ft 6 in (1.68 m)	So	Hoover HS	North Canton, OH
G	1	Kindell Fincher	5 ft 9 in (1.75 m)	So	Canterbury HS	Fort Wayne, IN
G	5	Kayla Davis	5 ft 6 in (1.68 m)	So	St. Marguerite d'Youville	Brampton, ON
G	12	Jada Byrd	5 ft 9 in (1.75 m)	So	Redan HS	Lithonia GA
F	14	Briana Glover	6 ft 1 in (1.85 m)	Sr	Mason	Mason, OH
G	15	Aliyah Zantt	5 ft 6 in (1.68 m)	Sr	Reynoldsburg HS	Reynoldsburg, OH
F	21	Maddison Blackwell	5 ft 11 in (1.8 m)	Jr	Lincoln HS	Gahanna, OH
G	22	Erica Dawson	5 ft 8 in (1.73 m)	RS So	Marietta HS	Marietta, OH
F	23	Leah Schaefer	6 ft 1 in (1.85 m)	Jr	Highlands HS	Alexandria, KY
G	24	Martha Thompson	5 ft 8 in (1.73 m)	RS So	Solon HS	Solon, OH
F	25	Anniina Äijänen	6 ft 2 in (1.88 m)	So	Sammon Keskuslukio	Tampere, Finland
G	30	Raeshaun Gaffney	5 ft 8 in (1.73 m)	RS Jr	Fairfield HS/Virginia	Fairfield, OH
F	31	Tierra Floyd	6 ft 1 in (1.85 m)	Fr	St. Bernard-Elmwood Place HS	Toledo, OH
G	35	Jenna Crittendon	5 ft 9 in (1.75 m)	Sr	Ryle HS	Union, KY
F	45	Imani Partlow	6 ft 1 in (1.85 m)	Fr	Winton Woods HS	Cincinnati, OH

Head coach

- Brian Neal (Northern Kentucky)

Assistant coach(es)

- Kate Achter (Bowling Green)
- Mark Ehlen (Ohio State)
- Carla D. Morrow (Tulsa)

Legend

- (C) Team captain
- (S) Suspended
- (I) Ineligible
- (W) Walk-on
- Injured
- Current redshirt

Roster

== Schedule ==
Date time, TV	Rank^{#}	Opponent^{#}	Result	Record	Site (attendance) city, state
Non-conference regular season
11/14/2015*; 1:00 pm, FSOH		Evansville; Lauren Hill Tipoff Classic	W 65–57	1–0	Cintas Center (3,122); Cincinnati, OH
11/19/2015*; 7:00 pm		at Michigan	L 54–92	1–1	Crisler Arena (2,613); Ann Arbor, MI
11/22/2015*; 2:00 pm		Maryland Eastern Shore	W 61–56	2–1	Cintas Center (811); Cincinnati, OH
11/25/2015*; 7:00 pm		Southeastern Louisiana	W 67–27	3–1	Cintas Center (652); Cincinnati, OH
11/28/2015*; 2:00 pm		Binghamton	W 64–55	4–1	Cintas Center (610); Cincinnati, OH
12/03/2015*; 12:00 pm		Tennessee Tech	W 64–47	5–1	Cintas Center (3,216); Cincinnati, OH
12/06/2015*; 2:00 pm		Middle Tennessee	L 53–62	5–2	Cintas Center (962); Cincinnati, OH
12/09/2015*; 7:00 pm		Radford	W 63–56	6–2	Cintas Center (713); Cincinnati, OH
12/13/2015*; 5:00 pm		Cincinnati	W 65–56	7–2	Cintas Center (1,863); Cincinnati, OH
12/19/2015*; 5:00 pm		Howard	W 70–47	8–2	Cintas Center (1,008); Cincinnati, OH
12/21/2015*; 1:00 pm		Kennesaw State	W 62–59	9–2	Cintas Center (654); Cincinnati, OH
Big East regular season
12/29/2015; 7:00 pm, BEDN		Georgetown	W 59–54	10–2 (1–0)	Cintas Center (911); Cincinnati, OH
12/31/2015; 2:00 pm, BEDN		Villanova	W 74–67 ^{OT}	11–2 (2–0)	Cintas Center (918); Cincinnati, OH
01/05/2016; 7:00 pm, BEDN		at Butler	W 73–63	12–2 (3–0)	Hinkle Fieldhouse (387); Indianapolis, IN
01/08/2016; 7:00 pm, FS1		at Creighton	L 47–74	12–3 (3–1)	D. J. Sokol Arena (1,214); Omaha, NE
01/10/2016; 1:00 pm, BEDN		at Providence	W 62–54	13–3 (4–1)	Alumni Hall (261); Providence, RI
01/15/2016; 7:00 pm, BEDN		Marquette	W 71–66	14–3 (5–1)	Cintas Center (1,015); Cincinnati, OH
01/17/2016; 2:00 pm, BEDN		DePaul	L 53–70	14–4 (5–2)	Cintas Center (1,384); Cincinnati, OH
01/22/2016; 7:00 pm, BEDN		at Seton Hall	L 66–82	14–5 (5–3)	Walsh Gymnasium (1,145); South Orange, NJ
01/24/2016; 2:00 pm, BEDN		at St. John's	L 41–57	14–6 (5–4)	Carnesecca Arena; Queens, NY
01/29/2016; 7:00 pm, BEDN		Butler	W 55–47	15–6 (6–4)	Cintas Center (1,165); Cincinnati, OH
02/05/2016; 8:00 pm, FS1		Providence	W 72–47	16–6 (7–4)	Cintas Center (1,641); Cincinnati, OH
02/07/2016; 2:00 pm, BEDN		Creighton	W 57–55	17–6 (8–4)	Cintas Center (828); Cincinnati, OH
02/12/2016; 8:00 pm, BEDN		at No. 23 DePaul	L 52–82	17–7 (8–5)	McGrath-Phillips Arena (2,352); Chicago, IL
02/14/2016; 2:30 pm, FS2		at Marquette	L 69–74	17–8 (8–6)	Al McGuire Center (1,769); Milwaukee, WI
02/19/2016; 2:00 pm, BEDN		St. John's	L 56–69	17–9 (8–7)	Cintas Center (1,694); Cincinnati, OH
02/21/2016; 2:00 pm, BEDN		Seton Hall	L 67–72	17–10 (8–8)	Cintas Center (1,812); Cincinnati, OH
02/26/2016; 9:00 pm, FS1		at Villanova	L 55–58	17–11 (8–9)	The Pavilion (541); Villanova, PA
02/28/2015; 12:00 pm, BEDN		at Georgetown	L 51–63	17–12 (8–10)	McDonough Gymnasium (609); Washington, D.C.
Big East Women's Tournament
03/05/2016; 5:30 pm, BEDN		vs. Butler; First Round	L 47–48	17–13	McGrath-Phillips Arena (1,741); Chicago, IL
*Non-conference game. ^{#}Rankings from AP Poll. (#) Tournament seedings in parentheses. All times are in Eastern Time.

== See also ==
2015–16 Xavier Musketeers men's basketball team
