= 2015–16 Providence Friars women's basketball team =

Intercollegiate basketball season

2015–16 Providence Friars women's basketball
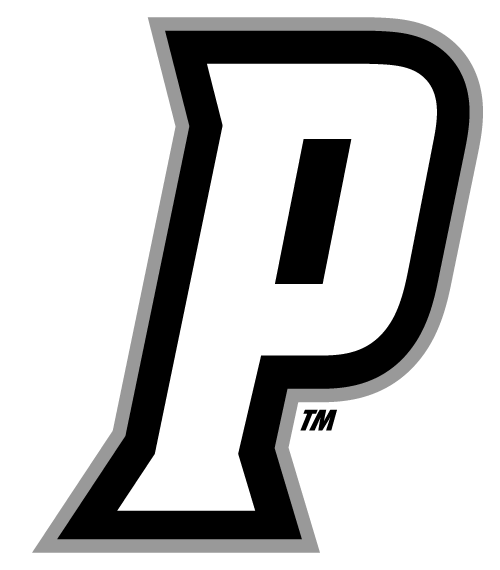
- Conference: Big East
- Record: 5–24 (1–17 Big East)
- Head coach: Susan Robinson Fruchtl (4th season)
- Assistant coaches: Dan Durkin; Dana Eikenberg; Dario Hernandez
- Home arena: Alumni Hall

2015–16 Big East Conference women's basketball standings
	Conf.				Overall
Team	W		L	PCT	W		L	PCT
No. 20 DePaul*	16	–	2	.889	27	–	9	.750
Seton Hall	12	–	6	.667	23	–	9	.719
Villanova	12	–	6	.667	20	–	12	.625
St. John's †	11	–	7	.611	23	–	10	.697
Georgetown	9	–	9	.500	16	–	14	.533
Marquette	9	–	9	.500	14	–	16	.467
Xavier	8	–	10	.444	17	–	13	.567
Creighton	8	–	10	.444	17	–	18	.486
Butler	4	–	14	.222	10	–	21	.323
Providence	1	–	17	.056	5	–	24	.172
† 2016 Big East Basketball Tournament winner * Tournament #1 seed As of March 26, 2016; Rankings from AP poll

The 2015–16 Providence Friars women's basketball team represented Providence College in the 2015–16 college basketball season. The Friars, led by fourth year head coach Susan Robinson Fruchtl, were are members of the Big East Conference and played their home games at Alumni Hall. They finished the season 5–24, 1–17 in Big East play to finish in last place. They lost in the first round of the Big East women's tournament to Creighton.

== Roster ==
2015–16 Providence Friars women's basketball team
Players
Coaches

Pos.	#	Name	Height	Year	Previous school	Hometown
G	0	Sarah Beal	5 ft 8 in (1.73 m)	Jr	New Hope Christian Academy	Matthews, NC
F	1	Alise Parker	6 ft 1 in (1.85 m)	So	Houston	Germantown, TN
G	2	Alison Lewis	5 ft 11 in (1.8 m)	So	Sanford	Kennett Square, PA
F	3	Erica Meyer	6 ft 3 in (1.91 m)	Fr	Wilton	Wilton, CT
G	10	Allegra Botteghi	6 ft 0 in (1.83 m)	So	G. Parini	Bologna, Italy
G	11	Jovana 'Yoyo' Nogic	6 ft 1 in (1.85 m)	Fr	Vergilio Ferreira	Lisbon, Portugal
G	21	Maddie Jolin	5 ft 9 in (1.75 m)	Fr	Bishop Feehan	Rehoboth, MA
F	22	Aliyah Miller	6 ft 1 in (1.85 m)	Jr	Southaven	Southaven, MS
G	23	Clara Che	5 ft 8 in (1.73 m)	Fr	Institut Joaquim Blume	Valencia, Spain
F	24	Rachel Aho	6 ft 3 in (1.91 m)	Fr	Marianapolis Prep	Holden, MA
F	25	Brianna Frias	6 ft 3 in (1.91 m)	So	Holy Name Central	Worcester, MA
F	30	Eva Iiskola	6 ft 0 in (1.83 m)	Sr	Makelanrinne	Espoo, Finland

Head coach

- Susan Robinson Fruchtl (Penn State)

Assistant coach(es)

- Dan Durkin (Mount St. Mary's)
- Dana Eikenberg (Penn State)
- Dario Hernandez (Shaw)

Legend

- (C) Team captain
- (S) Suspended
- (I) Ineligible
- (W) Walk-on
- Injured
- Current redshirt

Roster

== Schedule ==
Date time, TV	Rank^{#}	Opponent^{#}	Result	Record	Site (attendance) city, state
Non-conference regular season
11/13/2015*; 7:00 pm, BEDN		Boston College	L 41–67	0–1	Alumni Hall (461); Providence, RI
11/17/2015*; 7:00 pm		at Brown; Ocean State Cup	L 47–57	0–2	Pizzitola Sports Center (524); Providence, RI
11/20/2015*; 5:00 pm		at Virginia Tech	L 46–62	0–3	Cassell Coliseum (1,253); Blacksburg, VA
11/25/2015*; 12:00 pm		Hartford	W 69–50	1–3	Alumni Hall (723); Providence, RI
11/28/2015*; 1:00 pm		Monmouth	W 71–59	2–3	Alumni Hall (161); Providence, RI
12/01/2015*; 7:00 pm		at Albany	L 58–71	2–4	SEFCU Arena (856); Albany, NY
12/05/2015*; 1:00 pm		Richmond	L 50–57	2–5	Alumni Hall (233); Providence, RI
12/09/2015*; 7:00 pm		Bryant; Ocean State Cup	W 88–78	3–5	Alumni Hall (334); Providence, RI
12/12/2015*; 2:30 pm, FS2		Florida Gulf Coast	L 41–50	3–6	Alumni Hall (211); Providence, RI
12/20/2015*; 2:00 pm		at Rhode Island; Ocean State Cup	W 64–55 ^{OT}	4–6	Ryan Center (490); Kingston, RI
Big East regular season
12/29/2015; 1:00 pm, BEDN		Seton Hall	L 54–64	4–7 (0–1)	Alumni Hall (525); Providence, RI
12/31/2015; 1:00 pm, BEDN		St. John's	L 61–80	4–8 (0–2)	Alumni Hall (257); Providence, RI
01/03/2016; 1:00 pm, BEDN		at Villanova	L 39–67	4–9 (0–3)	The Pavilion (1,141); Villanova, PA
01/05/2016; 7:00 pm, BEDN		at Georgetown	L 53–63	4–10 (0–4)	McDonough Arena (365); Washington, D.C.
01/08/2016; 7:00 pm, BEDN		Butler	L 67–77	4–11 (0–5)	Alumni Hall (247); Providence, RI
01/10/2016; 1:00 pm, BEDN		Xavier	L 54–62	4–12 (0–6)	Alumni Hall (261); Providence, RI
01/17/2016; 2:05 pm, BEDN		at Creighton	L 48–72	4–13 (0–7)	D. J. Sokol Arena (762); Omaha, NE
01/22/2016; 8:00 pm, FS1		at Marquette	L 75–105	4–14 (0–8)	Al McGuire Center (1,135); Milwaukee, WI
01/24/2016; 3:00 pm, BEDN		at No. 24 DePaul	L 50–96	4–15 (0–9)	Phillips-McGrath Arena (2,022); Chicago, IL
01/29/2016; 7:00 pm, BEDN		Georgetown	L 51–82	4–16 (0–10)	Alumni Hall (276); Providence, RI
01/31/2016; 1:00 pm, BEDN		Villanova	L 47–76	4–17 (0–11)	Alumni Hall (352); Providence, RI
02/05/2016; 8:00 pm, FS1		at Xavier	L 47–72	4–18 (0–12)	Cintas Center (1,641); Cincinnati, OH
02/07/2016; 2:00 pm, BEDN		Butler	L 50–65	4–19 (0–13)	Hinkle Fieldhouse (463); Indianapolis, IN
02/14/2016; 1:00 pm, BEDN		Creighton	W 61–59	5–19 (1–13)	Alumni Hall (411); Providence, RI
02/19/2016; 7:00 pm, BEDN		No. 21 DePaul	L 68–91	5–20 (1–13)	Alumni Hall (211); Providence, RI
02/21/2016; 1:00 pm, BEDN		Marquette	L 85–92	5–21 (1–14)	Alumni Hall (317); Providence, RI
02/26/2016; 11:00 am, BEDN		at St. John's	L 54–69	5–22 (1–15)	Carnesecca Arena (5,227); Queens, NY
02/28/2016; 6:00 pm, BEDN		at Seton Hall	L 54–71	5–23 (1–16)	Walsh Gymnasium (1,012); South Orange, NJ
Big East Women's Tournament
03/05/2016; 3:00 pm, BEDN		vs. Creighton; First Round	L 53–70	5–24	McGrath-Phillips Arena; Chicago, IL
*Non-conference game. ^{#}Rankings from AP Poll. (#) Tournament seedings in parentheses. All times are in Eastern.

== See also ==
- 2015–16 Providence Friars men's basketball team
