= 2015–16 Butler Bulldogs women's basketball team =

Intercollegiate basketball season

2015–16 Butler Bulldogs women's basketball
- Conference: Big East
- Record: 10–21 (4–14 Big East)
- Head coach: Kurt Godlevske (2nd season)
- Assistant coaches: Damon Bailey; Julie Shelton; FahKara Malone
- Home arena: Hinkle Fieldhouse

2015–16 Big East Conference women's basketball standings
	Conf.				Overall
Team	W		L	PCT	W		L	PCT
No. 20 DePaul*	16	–	2	.889	27	–	9	.750
Seton Hall	12	–	6	.667	23	–	9	.719
Villanova	12	–	6	.667	20	–	12	.625
St. John's †	11	–	7	.611	23	–	10	.697
Georgetown	9	–	9	.500	16	–	14	.533
Marquette	9	–	9	.500	14	–	16	.467
Xavier	8	–	10	.444	17	–	13	.567
Creighton	8	–	10	.444	17	–	18	.486
Butler	4	–	14	.222	10	–	21	.323
Providence	1	–	17	.056	5	–	24	.172
† 2016 Big East Basketball Tournament winner * Tournament #1 seed As of March 26, 2016; Rankings from AP poll

The 2015–16 Butler Bulldogs women's basketball team represented Butler University in the 2015–16 college basketball season. The Bulldogs, led by second year head coach Kurt Godlevske, are members of the Big East Conference. The Bulldogs played their home games at the Hinkle Fieldhouse. They finished the season 10–21, 4–14 in Big East play to finish in ninth place. They advanced in the quarterfinals of the Big East women's tournament where they lost to DePaul.

== Roster ==
2015–16 Butler Bulldogs women's basketball team
Players
Coaches

Pos.	#	Name	Height	Year	Previous school	Hometown
G	2	Blaire Langlois	5 ft 8 in (1.73 m)	Sr	Carmel	Carmel, IN
F	3	Brittany Ward	6 ft 1 in (1.85 m)	Fr	Pike	Indianapolis, IN
G	4	Taylor Buford	5 ft 11 in (1.8 m)	Fr	Adlai Stevenson	Long Grove, IL
G/F	10	Nicole Orr	5 ft 10 in (1.78 m)	RS Fr	Reynoldsburg	Columbus, OH
G	11	Michelle Weaver	5 ft 7 in (1.7 m)	Fr	Saint Joseph	South Bend, IN
G	12	Sydney Buck	5 ft 7 in (1.7 m)	So	Homestead	Fort Wayne, IN
G	13	Emmy Schabel	5 ft 8 in (1.73 m)	So	Columbus North	Columbus, IN
G	22	Alexa Bailey	5 ft 7 in (1.7 m)	Fr	Bedford North Lawrence	Bedford, IN
F/C	25	Belle Obert	6 ft 2 in (1.88 m)	Sr	Del Oro	Loomis, CA
F	34	Tori Schickel	6 ft 1 in (1.85 m)	Fr	Mater Dei	Evansville, IN

Head coach

- Kurt Godlevske (Northern Michigan)

Assistant coach(es)

- Damon Bailey (Indiana)
- Julie Shelton (Butler)
- FahKara Malone (Purdue)

Legend

- (C) Team captain
- (S) Suspended
- (I) Ineligible
- (W) Walk-on
- Injured
- Current redshirt

Roster

== Schedule ==
Date time, TV	Rank^{#}	Opponent^{#}	Result	Record	Site (attendance) city, state
Exhibition
11/01/2015*; 2:00 pm		Marian	W 63–42		Hinkle Fieldhouse; Indianapolis, IN
11/08/2015*; 6:00 pm		Walsh	L 68–70 ^{OT}		Hinkle Fieldhouse; Indianapolis, IN
Non-conference regular season
11/13/2015*; 7:00 pm		Valparaiso	W 72–53	1–0	Hinkle Fieldhouse (426); Indianapolis, IN
11/15/2015*; 2:00 pm		at No. 25 Chattanooga	L 49–60	1–1	McKenzie Arena (1,549); Chattanooga, TN
11/25/2015*; 7:00 pm		at No. 18 South Florida	L 77–87	1–2	USF Sun Dome (1,772); Tampa, FL
11/28/2015*; 12:00 pm		vs. Clemson; UCF Tournament	W 54–50	2–2	CFE Arena (206); Orlando, FL
11/29/2015*; 2:30 pm		at UCF; UCF Tournament	W 71–63	3–2	CFE Arena (309); Orlando, FL
12/01/2015*; 7:00 pm, FS2		TCU	W 65–53	4–2	Hinkle Fieldhouse (791); Indianapolis, IN
12/04/2015*; 5:00 pm		at Wright State	L 53–66	4–3	Nutter Center (1,202); Fairborn, OH
12/06/2015*; 2:00 pm		at Ball State	L 50–58	4–4	John E. Worthen Arena (1,125); Muncie, IN
12/09/2015*; 7:00 pm		Green Bay	L 46–55	4–5	Hinkle Fieldhouse (346); Indianapolis, IN
12/13/2015*; 2:00 pm		Arkansas	W 63–57	5–5	Hinkle Fieldhouse (634); Indianapolis, IN
12/21/2015*; 6:05 pm		at Indiana State	L 63–70 ^{OT}	5–6	Hulman Center (1,765); Terre Haute, IN
Big East Conference Play
12/29/2015; 7:00 pm, BEDN		Villanova	L 45–57	5–7 (0–1)	Hinkle Fieldhouse (530); Indianapolis, IN
12/31/2015; 6:30 pm, BEDN		Georgetown	W 82–76	6–7 (1–1)	Hinkle Fieldhouse (444); Indianapolis, IN
01/05/2016; 6:30 pm, BEDN		Xavier	L 63–73	6–8 (1–2)	Hinkle Fieldhouse (387); Indianapolis, IN
01/08/2016; 7:00 pm, BEDN		at Providence	W 77–67	7–8 (2–2)	Alumni Hall (247); Providence, RI
01/10/2016; 2:05 pm, BEDN		at Creighton	L 49–77	7–9 (2–3)	D. J. Sokol Arena (651); Omaha, NE
01/15/2016; 7:00 pm, FS1		DePaul	L 54–61	7–10 (2–4)	Hinkle Fieldhouse (1,320); Indianapolis, IN
01/17/2016; 2:00 pm, BEDN		Marquette	L 64–80	7–11 (2–5)	Hinkle Fieldhouse (344); Indianapolis, IN
01/22/2016; 7:00 pm, BEDN		at St. John's	L 41–68	7–12 (2–6)	Carnesecca Arena (805); Queens, NY
01/24/2016; 2:00 pm, BEDN		at Seton Hall	L 77–98	7–13 (2–7)	Walsh Gymnasium (809); South Orange, NJ
01/29/2016; 7:00 pm, BEDN		at Xavier	L 47–55	7–14 (2–8)	Cintas Center (1,165); Cincinnati, OH
02/05/2016; 11:30 am, BEDN		Creighton	L 42–52	7–15 (2–9)	Hinkle Fieldhouse (697); Indianapolis, IN
02/07/2016; 2:00 pm, BEDN		Providence	W 65–50	8–15 (3–9)	Hinkle Fieldhouse (463); Indianapolis, IN
02/12/2016; 8:00 pm, BEDN		at Marquette	L 69–76	8–16 (3–10)	Al McGuire Center (1,231); Milwaukee, WI
02/14/2016; 3:00 pm, BEDN		at No. 23 DePaul	L 63–102	8–17 (3–11)	Phillips-McGrath Arena (2,409); Chicago, IL
02/19/2016; 7:00 pm, FS2		Seton Hall	L 67–72	8–18 (3–12)	Hinkle Fieldhouse (1,079); Indianapolis, IN
02/21/2016; 2:00 pm, BEDN		St. John's	W 62–58	9–18 (4–12)	Hinkle Fieldhouse (545); Indianapolis, IN
02/26/2016; 11:00 am, BEDN		at Georgetown	L 35–49	9–19 (4–13)	McDonough Gymnasium (789); Washington, D.C.
02/28/2016; 1:00 pm, BEDN		at Villanova	L 46–66	9–20 (4–14)	The Pavilion (901); Villanova, PA
Big East tournament
03/05/2016; 5:30 pm, BEDN		vs. Xavier; First Round	W 48–47	10–20	McGrath-Phillips Arena (1,741); Chicago, IL
03/06/2016; 7:00 pm, FS2		at DePaul; Quarterfinals	L 49–76	10–21	McGrath-Phillips Arena; Chicago, IL
*Non-conference game. ^{#}Rankings from AP Poll. (#) Tournament seedings in parentheses. All times are in Eastern BEDN=Big East Digital Network.

== See also ==
- 2015–16 Butler Bulldogs men's basketball team
