= 2015–16 Marquette Golden Eagles women's basketball team =

Intercollegiate basketball season

2015–16 Marquette Golden Eagles women's basketball
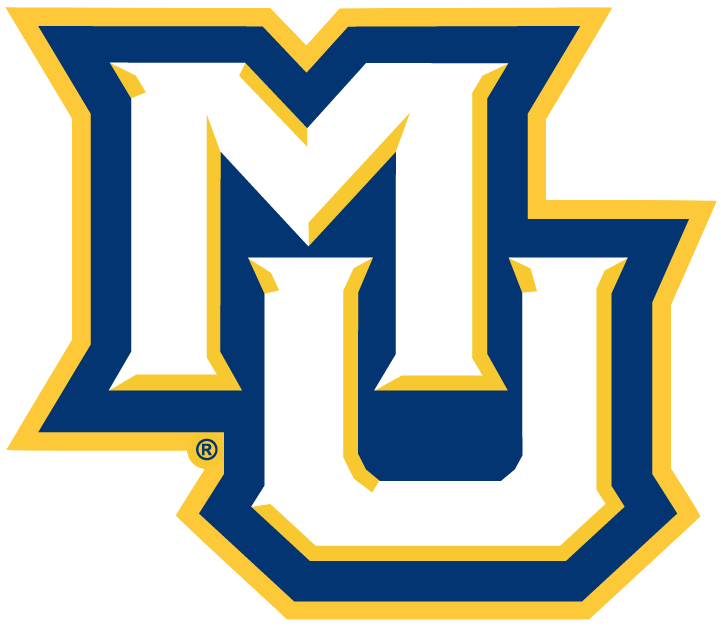

FIU Turkey Slam Champions
- Conference: Big East
- Record: 14–16 (9–9 Big East)
- Head coach: Carolyn Kieger (2nd season)
- Assistant coaches: Ginny Boggess; Scott Merritt; Vernette Skeete
- Home arena: Al McGuire Center

2015–16 Big East Conference women's basketball standings
	Conf.				Overall
Team	W		L	PCT	W		L	PCT
No. 20 DePaul*	16	–	2	.889	27	–	9	.750
Seton Hall	12	–	6	.667	23	–	9	.719
Villanova	12	–	6	.667	20	–	12	.625
St. John's †	11	–	7	.611	23	–	10	.697
Georgetown	9	–	9	.500	16	–	14	.533
Marquette	9	–	9	.500	14	–	16	.467
Xavier	8	–	10	.444	17	–	13	.567
Creighton	8	–	10	.444	17	–	18	.486
Butler	4	–	14	.222	10	–	21	.323
Providence	1	–	17	.056	5	–	24	.172
† 2016 Big East Basketball Tournament winner * Tournament #1 seed As of March 26, 2016; Rankings from AP poll

The 2015–16 Marquette Golden Eagles women's basketball team represented Marquette University in the 2015–16 college basketball season. The Golden Eagles, led by second year head coach Carolyn Kieger, are members of the Big East Conference. The Golden Eagles play their home games at the Al McGuire Center. They finished the season 14–16, 9–9 in Big East play to finish in a tie for fifth place. They lost in quarterfinals of the Big East women's tournament to Seton Hall.

== Roster ==
2015–16 Marquette Golden Eagles women's basketball team
Players
Coaches

Pos.	#	Name	Height	Year	Previous school	Hometown
G	1	Danielle King	5 ft 5 in (1.65 m)	Fr	Bloom Township	Chicago, IL
G	3	McKayla Yentz	6 ft 1 in (1.85 m)	So	Sun Prairie	Sun Prairie, WI
G	5	Natisha Hiedeman	5 ft 8 in (1.73 m)	Fr	Green Bay Southwest	Green Bay, WI
F	10	Sandra Dahling	5 ft 9 in (1.75 m)	Fr	None	Stockholm, Sweden
G	11	Allazia Blockton	6 ft 0 in (1.83 m)	Fr	Dominican	Milwaukee, WI
F	12	Erika Davenport	5 ft 11 in (1.8 m)	Fr	Clarkston	Clarkston, MI
G	13	Olivia Moskari	5 ft 9 in (1.75 m)	Fr	None	Helsinki, Finland
G	15	Amani Wilborn	5 ft 9 in (1.75 m)	Fr	Riverside University	Milwaukee, WI
F	22	Ines Mata	6 ft 1 in (1.85 m)	Fr	None	Madrid, Spain
C	31	Shantelle Valentine	6 ft 3 in (1.91 m)	So	St. Roch	Toronto, ON
G	32	Chesley Gibson	6 ft 0 in (1.83 m)	Jr	Gulf Coast State College	Pensacola, FL

Head coach

Carolyn Kieger (Marquette)

Assistant coach(es)

Ginny Boggess (Wingate)
Scott Merritt (Marquette)
Vernette Skeete (Alcorn State)

Legend

- (C) Team captain
- (S) Suspended
- (I) Ineligible
- (W) Walk-on
- Injured
- Current redshirt

Roster

== Schedule ==
Date time, TV	Rank^{#}	Opponent^{#}	Result	Record	Site (attendance) city, state
Exhibition
11/08/2015*; 3:30 pm		Southwest Baptist	W 70–68		Al McGuire Center (958); Milwaukee, WI
Non-conference regular season
11/13/2015*; 7:00 pm		at Green Bay	L 55–75	0–1	Kress Events Center (3,323); Green Bay, WI
11/16/2015*; 12:00 pm		IUPUI	L 55–60	0–2	Al McGuire Center (3,757); Milwaukee, WI
11/21/2015*; 12:00 pm, ESPN3		at Northern Kentucky	L 78–83	0–3	BB&T Arena (654); Highland Heights, KY
11/23/2015*; 7:00 pm		at South Dakota	L 69–97	0–4	DakotaDome (1,537); Vermillion, SD
11/27/2015*; 11:00 am		at FIU; FIU Turkey Slam semifinals	W 95–83	1–4	FIU Arena; Miami, FL
11/29/2015*; 11:00 am		vs. Richmond; FIU Turkey Slam championship	W 98–80	2–4	FIU Arena; Miami, FL
12/03/2015*; 6:00 pm, FS1		No. 7 Oregon State	L 58–65	2–5	Al McGuire Center (1,208); Milwaukee, WI
12/06/2015*; 2:00 pm, TWCSC		Wisconsin	W 77–61	3–5	Al McGuire Center (2,043); Milwaukee, WI
12/13/2015*; 1:00 pm, TWCSC		Auburn	W 70–69 ^{OT}	4–5	Al McGuire Center (1,275); Milwaukee, WI
12/19/2015*; 4:00 pm		at No. 21 Arizona State	L 80–90	4–6	Wells Fargo Arena (1,439); Tempe, AZ
12/22/2015*; 7:00 pm, ESPN3		at Milwaukee	W 101–81	5–6	Klotsche Center (1,322); Milwaukee, WI
Big East regular season
12/29/2015; 7:00 pm, BEDN		at No. 25 DePaul	L 86–91	5–7 (0–1)	McGrath-Phillips Arena (2,206); Chicago, IL
01/03/2016; 1:00 pm, BEDN		at Seton Hall	L 68–99	5–8 (0–2)	Walsh Gymnasium (842); South Orange, NJ
01/05/2016; 6:00 pm, BEDN		at St. John's	L 77–81 ^{OT}	5–9 (0–3)	Carnesecca Arena (448); Queens, NY
01/08/2016; 7:00 pm, BEDN		Villanova	L 75–82	5–10 (0–4)	Al McGuire Center (1,257); Milwaukee, WI
01/10/2016; 12:00 pm, FS2		Georgetown	W 87–72	6–10 (1–4)	Al McGuire Center (920); Milwaukee, WI
01/15/2016; 6:00 pm, BEDN		at Xavier	L 66–71	6–11 (1–5)	Cintas Center (1,015); Cincinnati, OH
01/17/2016; 1:00 pm, BEDN		at Butler	W 80–64	7–11 (2–5)	Hinkle Fieldhouse (344); Indianapolis, IN
01/22/2016; 7:00 pm, FS1		Providence	W 105–75	8–11 (3–5)	Al McGuire Center (1,135); Milwaukee, WI
01/24/2016; 2:00 pm, BEDN		Creighton	W 79–72	9–11 (4–5)	Al McGuire Center (1,117); Milwaukee, WI
01/29/2016; 7:00 pm, BEDN		St. John's	W 67–64	10–11 (5–5)	Al McGuire Center (1,131); Milwaukee, WI
01/31/2016; 2:00 pm, BEDN		Seton Hall	W 89–82	11–11 (6–5)	Al McGuire Center (1,527); Milwaukee, WI
02/05/2016; 6:05 pm, BEDN		at Georgetown	L 72–75	11–12 (6–6)	McDonough Gymnasium (466); Washington, D.C.
02/07/2016; 12:00 pm, BEDN		at Villanova	L 60–81	11–13 (6–7)	The Pavilion (1,009); Villanova, PA
02/12/2016; 7:00 pm, BEDN		Butler	W 76–69	12–13 (7–7)	Al McGuire Center (1,231); Milwaukee, WI
02/14/2016; 1:30 pm, FS2		Xavier	W 74–69	13–13 (8–7)	Al McGuire Center (1,769); Milwaukee, WI
02/19/2016; 7:05 pm, BEDN		at Creighton	L 81–83	13–14 (8–8)	D. J. Sokol Arena (964); Omaha, NE
02/21/2016; 12:00 pm, BEDN		at Providence	W 92–85	14–14 (9–8)	Alumni Hall (317); Providence, RI
02/27/2016; 5:00 pm, BEDN		No. 19 DePaul	L 65–98	14–15 (9–9)	Al McGuire Center (2,039); Milwaukee, WI
Big East Women's Tournament
03/06/2016; 2:30 pm, FS2		vs. Seton Hall; Quarterfinals	L 86–93	14–16	McGrath-Phillips Arena (1,884); Chicago, IL
*Non-conference game. ^{#}Rankings from AP Poll. (#) Tournament seedings in parentheses. All times are in Central.

== See also ==
2015–16 Marquette Golden Eagles men's basketball team
