= 2015–16 Georgetown Hoyas women's basketball team =

Intercollegiate basketball season

2015–16 Georgetown Hoyas women's basketball

TD Bank Classic Champions

WNIT, First Round
- Conference: Big East
- Record: 16–14 (9–9 Big East)
- Head coach: Natasha Adair (2nd season)
- Assistant coaches: James Clark; Melba Chambers; Sarah Jenkins
- Home arena: McDonough Gymnasium

2015–16 Big East Conference women's basketball standings
	Conf.				Overall
Team	W		L	PCT	W		L	PCT
No. 20 DePaul*	16	–	2	.889	27	–	9	.750
Seton Hall	12	–	6	.667	23	–	9	.719
Villanova	12	–	6	.667	20	–	12	.625
St. John's †	11	–	7	.611	23	–	10	.697
Georgetown	9	–	9	.500	16	–	14	.533
Marquette	9	–	9	.500	14	–	16	.467
Xavier	8	–	10	.444	17	–	13	.567
Creighton	8	–	10	.444	17	–	18	.486
Butler	4	–	14	.222	10	–	21	.323
Providence	1	–	17	.056	5	–	24	.172
† 2016 Big East Basketball Tournament winner * Tournament #1 seed As of March 26, 2016; Rankings from AP poll

The 2015–16 Georgetown Hoyas women's basketball team represented Georgetown University in the 2015–16 college basketball season. The Hoyas, led by second year head coach Natasha Adair, were members of the Big East Conference. The Hoyas played their home games at the McDonough Gymnasium. They finished the season 16–14, 9–9 in Big East play to finish in a tie for fifth place. They lost in quarterfinals of the Big East women's tournament to St. John's. They were invited to the Women's National Invitation Tournament, where they lost to Rutgers in the first round.

== Roster ==
2015–16 Georgetown Hoyas women's basketball team
Players
Coaches

Pos.	#	Name	Height	Year	Previous school	Hometown
G	1	Katie McCormick	5 ft 9 in (1.75 m)	Sr	Saint Mary's Ryken	Leonardtown, MD
G	2	Didi Burton	5 ft 5 in (1.65 m)	So	Baltimore City College	Baltimore, MD
G	3	Tyshell King	5 ft 11 in (1.8 m)	Jr	St. Frances Academy	Baltimore, MD
G	4	Mykia Jones (I) (redshirt)	5 ft 8 in (1.73 m)	Jr	Millbrook; Wake Forest	Raleigh, NC
F	10	Ki-Ke Rafiu	6 ft 2 in (1.88 m)	Jr	Saints Neumann-Goretti	Offa, Nigeria
G	11	Dionna White	5 ft 5 in (1.65 m)	Fr	Milford Mill	Baltimore, MD
G	13	Jade Martin	5 ft 11 in (1.8 m)	Jr	John F. Kennedy	Bloomington, MN
G	21	Jasmine Jackson	5 ft 9 in (1.75 m)	RS Sr	Old Bridge; George Mason	Old Bridge, NJ
G/F	22	Logan Battle	6 ft 2 in (1.88 m)	Sr	West Springfield	Springfield, VA
F	24	Faith Woodard	6 ft 2 in (1.88 m)	Jr	Freedom	Brandon, FL
C	32	Yazmine Belk	6 ft 3 in (1.91 m)	So	Nazareth Regional	Queens, NY
G	34	Dorothy Adomako	6 ft 1 in (1.85 m)	So	Cosby	Midlothian, VA
F	35	Dominique Vitalis	6 ft 2 in (1.88 m)	Sr	Gill St. Bernard's	Bloomfield, NJ
C	44	Jodi-Marie Ramil	6 ft 2 in (1.88 m)	Fr	Binghamton	Binghamton, NY

Head coach

- Natasha Adair (South Florida)

Assistant coach(es)

- James Clark (West Georgia College)/(Bethany College)
- Melba Chambers (Georgetown)
- Sarah Jenkins (Georgetown)

Legend

- (C) Team captain
- (S) Suspended
- (I) Ineligible
- (W) Walk-on
- Injured
- Current redshirt

Roster

== Schedule ==
Date time, TV	Rank^{#}	Opponent^{#}	Result	Record	Site (attendance) city, state
Non-conference regular season
11/13/2015*; 6:00 pm		at Maryland Eastern Shore	W 71–60	1–0	Hytche Athletic Center (622); Princess Anne, MD
11/18/2015*; 7:00 pm, BEDN		Virginia Tech	W 73–56	2–0	McDonough Gymnasium (781); Washington, D.C.
11/22/2015*; 3:00 pm		at Memphis	L 53–57	2–1	Elma Roane Fieldhouse (579); Memphis, TN
11/27/2015*; 3:00 pm		vs. Quinnipiac; TD Bank Classic semifinals	W 80–68	3–1	Patrick Gym; Burlington, VT
11/28/2015*; 7:00 pm		vs. St. Francis Brooklyn; TD Bank Classic championship	W 74–52	4–1	Patrick Gym (461); Burlington, VT
12/02/2015*; 7:00 pm		at George Mason	W 63–57	5–1	EagleBank Arena (621); Fairfax, VA
12/05/2015*; 1:30 pm		at St. Bonaventure	L 54–69	5–2	Reilly Center (485); Olean, NY
12/10/2015*; 7:00 pm		Delaware	W 61–50	6–2	McDonough Gymnasium (541); Washington, D.C.
12/12/2015*; 12:00 pm, SECN		at Alabama	L 66–78	6–3	Foster Auditorium (2,291); Tuscaloosa, AL
12/23/2015*; 12:00 pm		Towson	W 82–46	7–3	McDonough Gymnasium (413); Washington, D.C.
Non-conference regular season
12/29/2015; 7:00 pm, BEDN		at Xavier	L 54–59	7–4 (0–1)	Cintas Center (911); Cincinnati, OH
12/31/2015; 6:30 pm, BEDN		at Butler	L 76–82	7–5 (0–2)	Hinkle Fieldhouse (444); Indianapolis, IN
01/03/2016; 12:00 pm, BEDN		Creighton	W 69–57	8–5 (1–2)	McDonough Gymnasium (649); Washington, D.C.
01/05/2016; 7:00 pm, BEDN		Providence	W 63–53	9–5 (2–2)	McDonough Gymnasium (365); Washington, D.C.
01/08/2016; 7:00 pm, BEDN		at No. 24 DePaul	L 53–75	9–6 (2–3)	Phillips-McGrath Arena (2,201); Chicago, IL
01/10/2016; 12:00 pm, BEDN		at Marquette	L 72–87	9–7 (2–4)	Al McGuire Center (920); Milwaukee, WI
01/15/2016; 12:00 pm, BEDN		St. John's	L 60–65	9–8 (2–5)	McDonough Gymnasium (733); Washington, D.C.
01/17/2016; 1:00 pm, FS2		Seton Hall	L 75–83	9–9 (2–6)	McDonough Gymnasium (541); Washington, D.C.
01/24/2016; 1:00 pm, FS2		at Villanova	W 57–51	10–9 (3–6)	The Pavilion (335); Villanova, PA
01/29/2016; 7:00 pm, BEDN		at Providence	W 82–51	11–9 (4–6)	Alumni Hall (276); Providence, RI
01/31/2016; 1:05 pm, BEDN		at Creighton	W 57–44	12–9 (5–6)	D. J. Sokol Arena (1,120); Omaha, NE
02/05/2016; 7:05 pm, BEDN		Marquette	W 75–72	13–9 (6–6)	McDonough Gymnasium (466); Washington, D.C.
02/07/2016; 12:00 pm, BEDN		DePaul	L 66–80	13–10 (6–7)	McDonough Gymnasium (438); Washington, D.C.
02/12/2016; 7:00 pm, BEDN		at Seton Hall	W 73–65	14–10 (7–7)	Walsh Gymnasium (959); South Orange, NJ
02/14/2016; 2:00 pm, BEDN		at St. John's	L 55–63	14–11 (7–8)	Carnesecca Arena (3,120); Queens, NY
02/21/2016; 12:00 pm, BEDN		Villanova	L 60–63	14–12 (7–9)	McDonough Gymnasium (1,109); Washington, D.C.
02/26/2016; 11:00 am, BEDN		Butler	W 49–35	15–12 (8–9)	McDonough Gymnasium (789); Washington, D.C.
02/28/2016; 12:00 pm, BEDN		Xavier	W 63–51	16–12 (9–9)	McDonough Gymnasium (609); Washington, D.C.
Big East Women's Tournament
03/06/2016; 9:30 pm, FS2		vs. St. John's; Quarterfinals	L 52–65	16–13	McGrath-Phillips Arena (2,234); Chicago, IL
WNIT
03/17/2016*; 7:00 pm		at Rutgers; First Round	L 55–57	16–14	Louis Brown Athletic Center (453); Piscataway, NJ
*Non-conference game. ^{#}Rankings from AP Poll. (#) Tournament seedings in parentheses. All times are in Eastern.

== See also ==
2015–16 Georgetown Hoyas men's basketball team
