= 2015–16 Creighton Bluejays women's basketball team =

Intercollegiate basketball season

2015–16 Creighton Bluejays women's basketball

WNIT, First Round
- Conference: Big East
- Record: 17–18 (8–10 Big East)
- Head coach: Jim Flanery (13th season)
- Assistant coaches: Matt Fritsche; Chevelle Herring; Linda Sayavongchanh
- Home arena: D. J. Sokol Arena

2015–16 Big East Conference women's basketball standings
	Conf.				Overall
Team	W		L	PCT	W		L	PCT
No. 20 DePaul*	16	–	2	.889	27	–	9	.750
Seton Hall	12	–	6	.667	23	–	9	.719
Villanova	12	–	6	.667	20	–	12	.625
St. John's †	11	–	7	.611	23	–	10	.697
Georgetown	9	–	9	.500	16	–	14	.533
Marquette	9	–	9	.500	14	–	16	.467
Xavier	8	–	10	.444	17	–	13	.567
Creighton	8	–	10	.444	17	–	18	.486
Butler	4	–	14	.222	10	–	21	.323
Providence	1	–	17	.056	5	–	24	.172
† 2016 Big East Basketball Tournament winner * Tournament #1 seed As of March 26, 2016; Rankings from AP poll

The 2015–16 Creighton Bluejays women's basketball team represented Creighton University in the 2015–16 college basketball season. The Bluejays, led by thirteenth year head coach Jim Flanery, were members of the Big East Conference. The Bluejays played their home games at D. J. Sokol Arena. They finished the season 17–18, 8–10 in Big East to finish in a tie for seventh place. They advanced to the championship game of the Big East women's tournament where they lost to St. John's. They were invited to the Women's National Invitation Tournament, where they lost to South Dakota in the first round.

== Roster ==
2015–16 Creighton Bluejays women's basketball team
Players
Coaches

Pos.	#	Name	Height	Year	Previous school	Hometown
G	1	Jade Owens	5 ft 6 in (1.68 m)	So	Fenwick	River Forest, IL
G	2	Myah Mellman	5 ft 7 in (1.7 m)	So	Mason City	Mason City, IA
G	3	MC McGrory	5 ft 8 in (1.73 m)	Jr	Edina	Edina, MN
G	4	Aimee Rischard	5 ft 5 in (1.65 m)	So	Mount Saint Mary Catholic	Oklahoma City, OK
F	5	Jaylyn Agnew	5 ft 11 in (1.8 m)	Fr	Andover	Andover, KS
F	11	Bailey Norby	6 ft 2 in (1.88 m)	RS So	Forest Lake	Forest Lake, MN
G	12	Lauren Works	5 ft 7 in (1.7 m)	Jr	Lincoln Southwest	Lincoln, NE
G	14	Sydney Lamberty	5 ft 10 in (1.78 m)	So	Park	Cottage Grove, MN
G	20	Tessa Leytem	5 ft 11 in (1.8 m)	Sr	Wahlert Catholic	Dubuque, IA
G	21	Olivia Elger	5 ft 7 in (1.7 m)	Fr	Richwoods	Peoria, IL
G	23	Marissa Janning	5 ft 8 in (1.73 m)	Sr	Watertown-Mayer	Watertown, MN
F	33	Kylie Brown	6 ft 3 in (1.91 m)	So	Simley	Inver Grove Heights, MN
F	40	Ali Greene	6 ft 1 in (1.85 m)	Fr	Mahtomedi	Lino Lakes, MN
F	45	Audrey Faber	6 ft 2 in (1.88 m)	Fr	Dowling Catholic	Clive, IA
F	50	Brianna Rollerson	6 ft 0 in (1.83 m)	Jr	Central	Omaha, NE

Head coach

- Jim Flanery (Creighton)

Assistant coach(es)

- Matt Fritsche (Nebraska–Kearney)
- Chevelle Herring (Creighton)
- Linda Sayavongchanh (Drake)

Legend

- (C) Team captain
- (S) Suspended
- (I) Ineligible
- (W) Walk-on
- Injured
- Current redshirt

Roster

== Schedule ==
Date time, TV	Rank^{#}	Opponent^{#}	Result	Record	Site (attendance) city, state
Exhibition
11/05/2015*; 7:05 pm		Newman	W 79–62		D. J. Sokol Arena (710); Omaha, NE
Non-conference regular season
11/13/2015*; 12:05 pm, BEDN		Wichita State	W 79–54	1–0	D. J. Sokol Arena (1,071); Omaha, NE
11/15/2015*; 11:05 am		Marist	W 89–46	2–0	D. J. Sokol Arena (535); Omaha, NE
11/24/2015*; 7:05 pm, ESPN3		at Drake	L 72–81	2–1	Knapp Center (2,462); Des Moines, IA
11/26/2015*; 7:30 pm		vs. East Carolina; Lone Star Showcase	W 91–66	3–1	Cedar Park Center (787); Cedar Park, TX
11/27/2015*; 7:30 pm		vs. No. 19 Northwestern; Lone Star Showcase	L 52–75	3–2	Cedar Park Center (687); Cedar Park, TX
11/28/2015*; 5:00 pm		vs. Eastern Washington; Lone Star Showcase	W 66–60 ^{OT}	4–2	Cedar Park Center; Cedar Park, TX
12/02/2015*; 7:00 pm, ESPN3		at Kansas	L 54–67	4–3	Allen Fieldhouse (1,753); Lawrence, KS
12/06/2015*; 2:00 pm		at Nebraska	L 63–65	4–4	Pinnacle Bank Arena (6,056); Lincoln, NE
12/09/2015*; 8:00 pm		at Utah	L 58–74	4–5	Jon M. Huntsman Center (805); Salt Lake City, UT
12/12/2015*; 7:05 pm		South Dakota State	L 51–53	4–6	D. J. Sokol Arena (1,023); Omaha, NE
12/20/2015*; 8:00 pm		at Nebraska–Omaha	W 69–46	5–6	Baxter Arena (1,362); Omaha, NE
12/22/2015*; 6:05 pm		Northern Iowa	W 69–61	6–6	D. J. Sokol Arena (1,228); Omaha, NE
Big East regular season
12/29/2015; 6:00 pm, FS2		St. John's	L 55–66	6–7 (0–1)	D. J. Sokol Arena (1,563); Omaha, NE
12/31/2015; 1:05 pm, BEDN		Seton Hall	L 82–86	6–8 (0–2)	D. J. Sokol Arena (780); Omaha, NE
01/03/2016; 11:00 am, BEDN		at Georgetown	L 57–69	6–9 (0–3)	McDonough Gymnasium (649); Washington, D.C.
01/05/2016; 6:00 pm, BEDN		at Villanova	W 65–62	7–9 (1–3)	The Pavilion (509); Villanova, PA
01/08/2016; 6:00 pm, FS1		Xavier	W 74–47	8–9 (2–3)	D. J. Sokol Arena (1,214); Omaha, NE
01/10/2016; 1:05 pm, BEDN		Butler	W 77–49	9–9 (3–3)	D. J. Sokol Arena (651); Omaha, NE
01/17/2016; 1:05 pm, BEDN		Providence	W 72–48	10–9 (4–3)	D. J. Sokol Arena (762); Omaha, NE
01/22/2016; 7:00 pm, BEDN		at No. 24 DePaul	L 63–81	10–10 (4–4)	Phillips-McGrath Arena (2,042); Chicago, IL
01/24/2016; 2:00 pm, BEDN		at Marquette	L 72–79	10–11 (4–5)	Al McGuire Center (1,117); Milwaukee, WI
01/29/2016; 7:00 pm, FS1		Villanova	W 53–48	11–11 (5–5)	D. J. Sokol Arena (1,327); Omaha, NE
01/31/2016; 1:05 pm, BEDN		Georgetown	L 44–57	11–12 (5–6)	D. J. Sokol Arena (1,120); Omaha, NE
02/05/2016; 10:30 am, BEDN		at Butler	W 52–42	12–12 (6–6)	Hinkle Fieldhouse (697); Indianapolis, IN
02/07/2016; 1:00 pm, BEDN		at Xavier	L 55–57	12–13 (6–7)	Cintas Center (828); Cincinnati, OH
02/14/2016; 12:00 pm, BEDN		at Providence	L 59–61	12–14 (6–8)	Alumni Hall (411); Providence, RI
02/19/2016; 7:05 pm, BEDN		Marquette	W 83–81	13–14 (7–8)	D. J. Sokol Arena (964); Omaha, NE
02/21/2016; 1:00 pm, FS1		No. 21 DePaul	L 52–78	13–15 (7–9)	D. J. Sokol Arena (1,255); Omaha, NE
02/26/2016; 6:05 pm, BEDN		at Seton Hall	L 71–77	13–16 (7–10)	Walsh Gymnasium (886); South Orange, NJ
02/28/2016; 2:00 pm, FS2		at St. John's	W 64–57	14–16 (8–10)	Carnesecca Arena (1,242); Queens, NY
Big East Women's Tournament
03/05/2016; 2:00 pm, BEDN		vs. Providence; First Round	W 70–53	15–16	McGrath-Phillips Arena; Chicago, IL
03/06/2016; 12:00 pm, FS2		vs. Villanova; Quarterfinals	W 57–48	16–16	McGrath-Phillips Arena; Chicago, IL
03/07/2016; 3:00 pm, FS1		vs. Seton Hall; Semifinals	W 77–56	17–16	McGrath-Phillips Arena; Chicago, IL
03/08/2016; 7:00 pm, FS1		vs. St. John's; Championship Game	L 37–50	17–17	McGrath-Phillips Arena (1,620); Chicago, IL
WNIT
03/16/2016*; 7:00 pm		at South Dakota; First Round	L 68–74	17–18	DakotaDome (1,960); Vermillion, SD
*Non-conference game. ^{#}Rankings from AP Poll. (#) Tournament seedings in parentheses. All times are in Central.

== See also ==
2015–16 Creighton Bluejays men's basketball team
