= 2015–16 Seton Hall Pirates women's basketball team =

Intercollegiate basketball season

2015–16 Seton Hall Pirates women's basketball

Cancún Challenge Riviera Division Champions

NCAA Women's Tournament, first round
- Conference: Big East Conference
- Record: 23–9 (12–6 Big East)
- Head coach: Anthony Bozzella (3rd season)
- Assistant coaches: Lauren DeFalco; Tiffany Jones-Smart; Christian Stefanopoulos
- Home arena: Walsh Gymnasium

2015–16 Big East Conference women's basketball standings
	Conf.				Overall
Team	W		L	PCT	W		L	PCT
No. 20 DePaul*	16	–	2	.889	27	–	9	.750
Seton Hall	12	–	6	.667	23	–	9	.719
Villanova	12	–	6	.667	20	–	12	.625
St. John's †	11	–	7	.611	23	–	10	.697
Georgetown	9	–	9	.500	16	–	14	.533
Marquette	9	–	9	.500	14	–	16	.467
Xavier	8	–	10	.444	17	–	13	.567
Creighton	8	–	10	.444	17	–	18	.486
Butler	4	–	14	.222	10	–	21	.323
Providence	1	–	17	.056	5	–	24	.172
† 2016 Big East Basketball Tournament winner * Tournament #1 seed As of March 26, 2016; Rankings from AP poll

The 2015–16 Seton Hall Pirates women's basketball team represent Seton Hall University during the 2015–16 NCAA Division I women's basketball season. The Pirates, led by third-head coach Anthony Bozzella, played their home games in Newark, New Jersey at the Walsh Gymnasium and were members of the Big East Conference. They finished the season 23–9, 12–6 in Big East play to finish in a tie for second place. They advanced to the semifinals of the Big East women's tournament, where they lost to Creighton. They received an at-large bid to the NCAA women's basketball tournament, where they lost to Duquesne in the first round.

== Roster ==
2015–16 Seton Hall Pirates women's basketball team
Players
Coaches

Pos.	#	Name	Height	Year	Hometown
G	00	JaQuan Jackson	5 ft 8 in (1.73 m)	Jr	Killeen, TX
F	1	Tabatha Richardson-Smith	6 ft 0 in (1.83 m)	Sr	Bay City, TX
F	2	Tiffany Jones	6 ft 3 in (1.91 m)	Sr	New York, NY
G	3	LaTecia Smith	5 ft 6 in (1.68 m)	Fr	Gardenia, CA
G	4	Kaity Healy	5 ft 6 in (1.68 m)	Fr	Colts Neck, NJ
G/F	5	Martha Kuderer	5 ft 11 in (1.8 m)	Fr	Eden Prairie, MN
G	10	Jordan Mosley	5 ft 9 in (1.75 m)	RS Sr	Orlando, FL
G	13	Samantha Bozzella	5 ft 4 in (1.63 m)	So	West Orange, NJ
F	14	Taylor Byrne	6 ft 1 in (1.85 m)	Fr	Massapequa, NY
G	15	Aleesha Powell	5 ft 6 in (1.68 m)	RS Sr	Philadelphia, PA
G/F	21	Kathleen Egan	5 ft 10 in (1.78 m)	RS So	Aberdeen, NJ
G	23	Tara Inman	5 ft 9 in (1.75 m)	Jr	Holmdal, NJ
G	24	Shakena Richardson	5 ft 4 in (1.63 m)	RS Sr	Neptune, NJ
C	25	Jordan Molyneaux	6 ft 2 in (1.88 m)	RS Fr	Denver, CO
G/F	30	Claire Lundberg	6 ft 1 in (1.85 m)	So	Andover, MN
C	35	Lubirdia Gordon	6 ft 4 in (1.93 m)	Jr	Mount Vernon, NY

Head coach

- Anthony Bozzella (Seton Hall)

Assistant coach(es)

- Lauren DeFalco (Iona)
- Tiffany Jones-Smart (Saint Peter's)
- Christian Stefanopoulos (Thomas More)

Legend

- (C) Team captain
- (S) Suspended
- (I) Ineligible
- (W) Walk-on
- Injured
- Current redshirt

Roster

== Rankings ==
+ Regular season polls	Poll	Pre- season	Week 2	Week 3	Week 4	Week 5	Week 6	Week 7	Week 8	Week 9	Week 10	Week 11	Week 12	Week 13	Week 14	Week 15	Week 16	Week 17	Week 18	Week 19	Final
AP	NR	NR	NR	22	RV	RV	RV	RV	25	RV	NR	NR	NR	NR	NR	NR	NR	NR	NR	N/A	
Coaches	RV	RV	25	21	RV	25	24	23	20	RV	RV	25	RV	RV	RV	RV	RV	RV	RV	NR	

Legend
	Increase in ranking
	Decrease in ranking
	Not ranked previous week
(RV)	Received votes

== Schedule ==
Date time, TV	Rank^{#}	Opponent^{#}	Result	Record	Site (attendance) city, state
Exhibition
11/07/2015*; 2:00 pm		Philadelphia	W 71–47		Walsh Gymnasium (571); South Orange, NJ
Non-conference regular season
11/13/2015*; 11:00 am, PSN		Bryant	W 93–57	1–0	Walsh Gymnasium (1,132); South Orange, NJ
11/16/2015*; 7:00 pm, FS2		Rutgers	W 77–49	2–0	Walsh Gymnasium (1,628); South Orange, NJ
11/19/2015*; 7:00 pm, FS2		Princeton	W 71–64	3–0	Walsh Gymnasium (1,130); South Orange, NJ
11/21/2015*; 2:00 pm		at Saint Joseph's	W 66–54	4–0	Hagan Arena (921); Philadelphia, PA
11/24/2015*; 8:00 pm		at Texas–Arlington	W 61–54	5–0	College Park Center (836); Arlington, TX
11/26/2015*; 6:30 pm		vs. NC State; Women's Cancún Challenge Riviera Division	W 58–55	6–0	Hard Rock Hotel Riviera Maya (133); Cancún, Mexico
11/27/2015*; 9:00 pm		vs. Northern Iowa; Women's Cancún Challenge Riviera Division	W 57–49	7–0	Hard Rock Hotel Riviera Maya (133); Cancún, Mexico
12/06/2015*; 2:00 pm	No. 22	at Georgia	L 52–70	7–1	Stegeman Coliseum (3,013); Athens, GA
12/09/2015*; 7:00 pm, PSN		Fordham	W 66–54	8–1	Walsh Gymnasium (1,002); South Orange, NJ
12/12/2015*; 5:00 pm, ESPN3		at Liberty	W 92–56	9–1	Vines Center (1,990); Williamsburg, VA
12/20/2015*; 12:00 pm, PSN		Saint Peter's	W 81–65	10–1	Walsh Gymnasium (866); South Orange, NJ
Big East regular season
12/29/2015; 1:00 pm, BEDN		at Providence	W 64–54	11–1 (1–0)	Alumni Hall (525); Providence, RI
12/31/2015; 2:05 pm, BEDN		at Creighton	W 86–82	12–1 (2–0)	D. J. Sokol Arena (780); Omaha, NE
01/03/2016; 2:00 pm, BEDN		Marquette	W 99–68	13–1 (3–0)	Walsh Gymnasium (842); South Orange, NJ
01/05/2016; 7:00 pm, FS2	No. 25	No. 24 DePaul	L 74–86	13–2 (3–1)	Walsh Gymnasium (851); South Orange, NJ
01/09/2016; 2:00 pm, BEDN	No. 25	at St. John's	L 69–71	13–3 (3–2)	Carnesecca Arena; Queens, NY
01/15/2016; 7:00 pm, BEDN		at Villanova	L 45–55	13–4 (3–3)	The Pavilion (909); Villanova, PA
01/17/2016; 1:00 pm, BEDN		at Georgetown	W 83–75	14–4 (4–3)	McDonough Gymnasium (541); Washington, D.C.
01/22/2016; 7:00 pm, BEDN		Xavier	W 82–66	15–4 (5–3)	Walsh Gymnasium (1,145); South Orange, NJ
01/24/2016; 2:00 pm, BEDN		Butler	W 98–77	16–4 (6–3)	Walsh Gymnasium (809); South Orange, NJ
01/29/2016; 1:00 pm, BEDN		at No. 23 DePaul	W 83–74	17–4 (7–3)	Phillips-McGrath Arena (3,001); Chicago, IL
01/31/2016; 3:00 pm, BEDN		at Marquette	L 82–89	17–5 (7–4)	Al McGuire Center (1,527); Milwaukee, WI
02/07/2016; 1:30 pm, FS1		St. John's	L 64–72	17–6 (7–5)	Walsh Gymnasium (1,697); South Orange, NJ
02/12/2016; 7:00 pm, BEDN		Georgetown	L 65–73	17–7 (7–6)	Walsh Gymnasium (959); South Orange, NJ
02/14/2016; 2:00 pm, BEDN		Villanova	W 60–50	18–7 (8–6)	Walsh Gymnasium (1,231); South Orange, NJ
02/19/2016; 7:00 pm, FS2		at Butler	W 72–67	19–7 (9–6)	Hinkle Fieldhouse (1,079); Indianapolis, IN
02/21/2016; 2:00 pm, BEDN		at Xavier	W 72–67	20–7 (10–6)	Cintas Center (1,812); Cincinnati, OH
02/26/2016; 7:00 pm, BEDN		Creighton	W 77–71	21–7 (11–6)	Walsh Gymnasium (886); South Orange, NJ
02/28/2016; 6:00 pm, BEDN		Providence	W 71–54	22–7 (12–6)	Walsh Gymnasium (1,012); South Orange, NJ
Big East Women's Tournament
03/06/2016; 3:30 pm, FS2		vs. Marquette; Quarterfinals	W 93–86	23–7	McGrath-Phillips Arena (1,884); Chicago, IL
03/07/2016; 4:00 pm, FS1		vs. Creighton; Semifinals	L 56–77	23–8	McGrath-Phillips Arena; Chicago, IL
Big East Women's Tournament
03/19/2016*; 1:30 pm, ESPN2	(8 B)	vs. (9 B) Duquesne; First Round	L 76–97	23–9	Gampel Pavilion; Storrs, CT
*Non-conference game. ^{#}Rankings from AP Poll. (#) Tournament seedings in parentheses. B=Bridgeport Region. All times are in Eastern Time.

== See also ==
- 2015–16 Seton Hall Pirates men's basketball team
