= 2016 Big East women's basketball tournament =

- Classification: Division I
- Season: 2015–16
- Teams: 10
- Site: McGrath-Phillips Arena; Chicago, IL
- Champions: St. John's (4th title)
- Winning coach: Joe Tartamella (1st title)
- MVP: Aliyyah Handford (St. John's)
- Attendance: 9,610
- Television: FS1

2015–16 Big East Conference women's basketball standings
| | Conf. | | | | Overall |
| Team | W | | L | PCT | W | | L | PCT |
|---|---|---|---|---|---|---|---|---|
| No. 20 DePaul* | 16 | – | 2 | .889 | 27 | – | 9 | .750 |
| Seton Hall | 12 | – | 6 | .667 | 23 | – | 9 | .719 |
| Villanova | 12 | – | 6 | .667 | 20 | – | 12 | .625 |
| St. John's † | 11 | – | 7 | .611 | 23 | – | 10 | .697 |
| Georgetown | 9 | – | 9 | .500 | 16 | – | 14 | .533 |
| Marquette | 9 | – | 9 | .500 | 14 | – | 16 | .467 |
| Xavier | 8 | – | 10 | .444 | 17 | – | 13 | .567 |
| Creighton | 8 | – | 10 | .444 | 17 | – | 18 | .486 |
| Butler | 4 | – | 14 | .222 | 10 | – | 21 | .323 |
| Providence | 1 | – | 17 | .056 | 5 | – | 24 | .172 |
† 2016 Big East Basketball Tournament winner * Tournament #1 seed As of March 26, 2016; Rankings from AP poll

The 2016 Big East women's basketball tournament, officially known as the 2016 Big East championship, was a tournament from March 5 to 8 at McGrath-Phillips Arena in Chicago, Illinois. St. John's won their 4th Big East title for the first time since 1988 and earn an automatic trip to the NCAA women's tournament.

== Seeds ==
2016 Big East women's basketball tournament seeds and results
| Seed | School | Conf. | Over. | Tiebreaker |
| 1 | DePaul | 16–2 | 24–7 | |
| 2 | Villanova | 12–6 | 19–10 | 1–1 vs. SHU, 1–1 vs. DEPAUL, 2–0 vs ST. JOHN'S |
| 3 | Seton Hall | 12–6 | 22–7 | 1–1 vs. VILLANOVA, 1–1 vs. DEPAUL, 0–2 vs. ST. JOHN'S |
| 4 | St. John's | 11–7 | 20–9 | |
| 5 | Georgetown | 9–9 | 16–12 | 1–1 vs. MARQUETTE |
| 6 | Marquette | 9–9 | 14–15 | 1–1 vs. GTOWN |
| 7 | Creighton | 8–8 | 14–16 | 1–1 vs. XAVIER |
| 8 | Xavier | 8–8 | 17–12 | 1–1 vs. CREIGHTON |
| 9 | Butler | 4–14 | 9–20 | |
| 10 | Providence | 1–17 | 5–23 | |
‡ – Big East regular season champions, and tournament No. 1 seed. † – Received a single-bye in the conference tournament. Overall records include all games played in the Big East tournament.

== Schedule ==
| Game | Time* | Matchup^{#} | Television | Attendance |
First round – Saturday, March 5
| 1 | 2:00 PM | #7 Creighton vs #10 Providence | BEDN | 1,741 |
| 2 | 4:30 PM | #8 Xavier vs #9 Butler | BEDN | 1,741 |
Quarterfinals – Sunday, March 6
| 3 | Noon | #2 Villanova vs #7 Creighton | FS2 | 1,884 |
| 4 | 2:30 PM | #3 Seton Hall vs #6 Marquette | FS2 | 1,884 |
| 5 | 6:00 PM | #1 DePaul vs #9 Butler | FS2 | 2,234 |
| 6 | 8:30 PM | #4 St. John's vs #5 Georgetown | FS2 | 2,234 |
Semifinals – Monday, March 7
| 7 | 3:00 PM | #3 Seton Hall vs. #7 Creighton | FS1 | 2,131 |
| 8 | 5:30 PM | #1 DePaul vs #4 St. John's | FS1 | 2,131 |
Championship – Tuesday, March 8
| 9 | 7:00 PM | #7 Creighton vs. #4 St. John's | FS1 | 1,620 |
*Game Times in CT. #-Rankings denote tournament seed

== Bracket ==
Opening Round; March 5, 2016
8 | Xavier | 47
9 | Butler | 48
7 | Creighton | 70
10 | Providence | 53

Quarterfinals; March 6, 2016
1 | DePaul | 76
9 | Butler | 49
4 | St. John's | 65
5 | Georgetown | 52
2 | Villanova | 48
7 | Creighton | 57
3 | Seton Hall | 93
6 | Marquette | 86

Semifinals; March 7, 2016
1 | DePaul | 66
4 | St. John's | 75
7 | Creighton | 77
3 | Seton Hall | 56

Championship; March 8, 2016
4 | St. John's | 50
7 | Creighton | 37

== See also ==
- 2016 Big East men's basketball tournament
