= Susan Robinson Fruchtl =

American basketball player

Personal information
- Listed height: 6 ft 1 in (1.85 m)

Career information
- College: Penn State (1988–1993)
- Position: Forward

Career highlights
- Wade Trophy (1992); All-American – USBWA, Kodak (1992)

Susan Robinson Fruchtl is the former athletic director at Saint Francis University.

== College ==
Susan Robinson graduated in 1992 from Penn State University with a B.S. in exercise and sports science. In 1992, she was named a consensus All-American and won the Wade Trophy as the best women's college basketball player in NCAA Division I, after previously winning Atlantic 10 Freshman-of-the-Year honors, twice being named to the All-Atlantic 10 Conference team, and chosen as the conference Player of the Year in 1991. Her 2,253 career points stood as a school record, until eclipsed in 2004.

Robinson Fruchtl holds a master's degree in higher education from Penn State.

=== Penn State statistics ===
Legend
GP	Games played	GS	Games started	MPG	Minutes per game
FG%	Field goal percentage	3P%	3-point field goal percentage	FT%	Free throw percentage
RPG	Rebounds per game	APG	Assists per game	SPG	Steals per game
BPG	Blocks per game	PPG	Points per game	**Bold**	Career high

Year	Team	GP	Points	FG%	3P%	FT%	RPG	APG	SPG	BPG	PPG
1989	Penn State	28	503	51.6%	0.0%	82.2%	9.3	1.4	**2.0**	**0.6**	18.0
1990	Penn State	32	**633**	50.1%	33.3%	88.5%	**9.4**	1.7	1.3	0.3	**19.8**
1991	Penn State	**31**	560	**54.7%**	**41.9%**	88.6%	8.4	**1.9**	1.4	0.3	18.1
1992	Penn State	**31**	557	51.2%	40.4%	**90.7%**	7.9	1.5	1.3	0.2	18.0
Career		122	2253	51.8%	40.0%	87.4%	8.8	1.6	1.5	0.3	18.5

== Coaching ==
Robinson Fruchtl served as an assistant coach at Penn State from 1993 to 1998, later rejoining the staff in May 2004. In June 2000, she became head girls' basketball coach at Beaver Area High School, ultimately leading the team to the PIAA Class AAA playoffs in her final two seasons.

Robinson Fruchtl was coach at Saint Francis from 2007 to 2012 with her 74 career wins tied for third on the school's list. She was named the 2011 NEC Coach of the Year. She then served as the head women's basketball coach at Providence for four seasons.

Robinson Fruchtl returned to coaching the Red Flash during the 2018–19 season when Joe Haigh took a leave of absence on November 13, 2018, and continued in that role for the rest of the season following Haigh's resignation on February 1, 2019.

== Administration ==
Robinson Fruchtl returned to Saint Francis University as director of athletics.

== Family ==
She married Tony Fruchtl in 1997.

== Head coaching record ==
Record table
Season	Team	Overall	Conference	Standing	Postseason
Saint Francis (Northeast Conference) (2007–2012)
2007–08	Saint Francis	6–23	3–15	T–10th	
2008–09	Saint Francis	15–17	11–7	T–3rd	
2009–10	Saint Francis	17–15	11–7	T–4th	NCAA round of 64
2010–11	Saint Francis	22–12	14–4	1st	NCAA round of 64
2011–12	Saint Francis	14–16	11–7	T–4th	
Saint Francis:		74–83	50–40		
Providence (Big East Conference) (2012–2016)
2012–13	Providence	7–23	2–14	14th	
2013–14	Providence	7–23	2–16	10th	
2014–15	Providence	6–24	3–15	9th	
2015–16	Providence	5–24	1–17	10th	
Providence:		25–94	8–62		
Saint Francis (Northeast Conference) (2018–2019)
2018–19	Saint Francis	16–17	11–7	4th	
Saint Francis:		90–100	61–47		
Total:		115–194			
National champion Postseason invitational champion Conference regular season champion Conference regular season and conference tournament champion Division regular season champion Division regular season and conference tournament champion Conference tournament champion

== See also ==
- List of NCAA Division I athletic directors
