= Alumni Hall (Providence) =

Basketball gymnasium at Providence College

- Mullaney Gymnasium
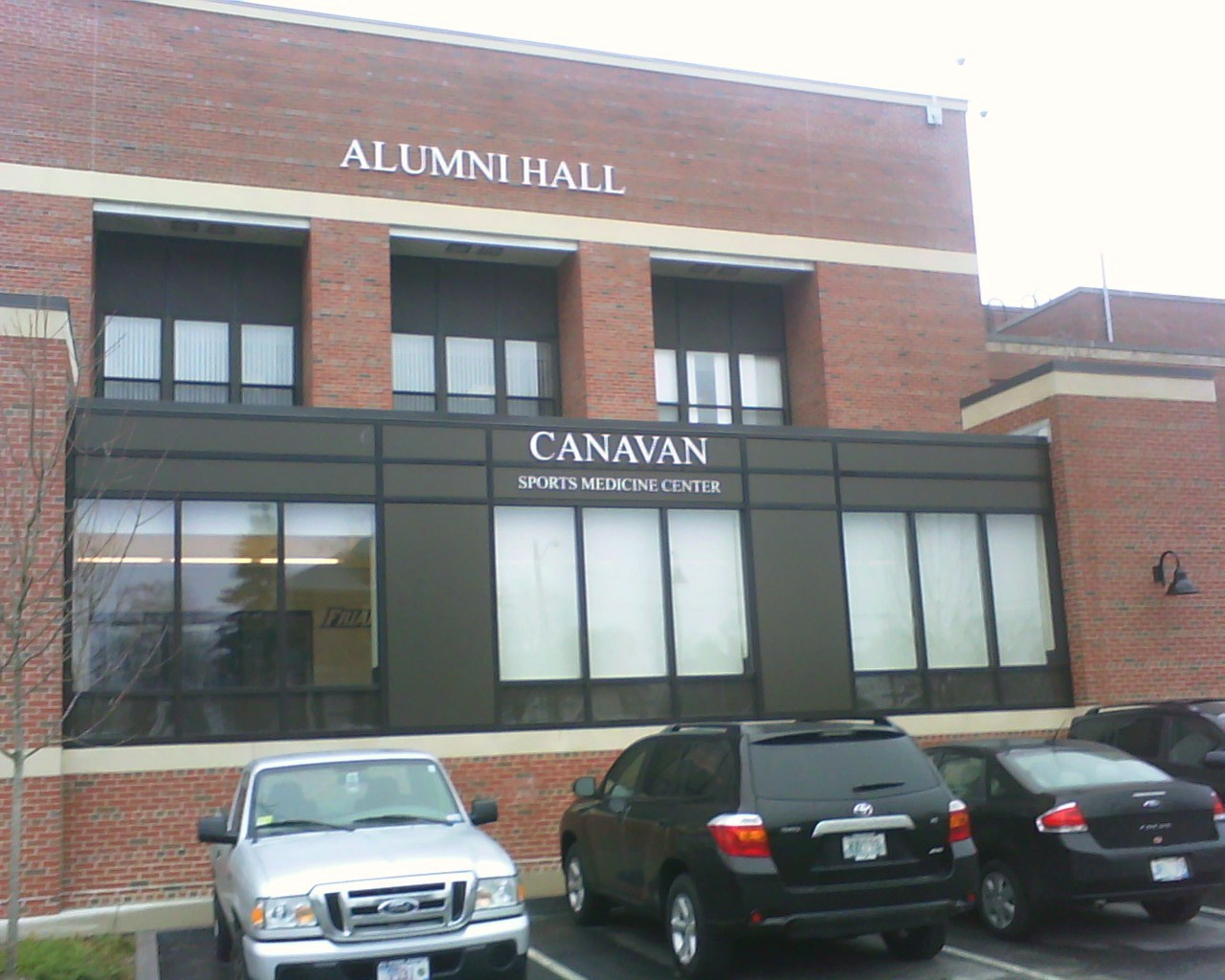
- Alumni Hall (Providence)
- Interactive map of Alumni Hall
- Location: Providence College; Providence, RI 02918 USA
- Coordinates: 41.84575°N 71.437029°W
- Owner: Providence College
- Operator: Providence College
- Capacity: 1,854 (basketball; 2012–present); 2,620 (basketball; 1955–2012)

Construction
- Opened: December, 1955
- Renovated: 2012
- Cost: $1.5 million

Tenants
- Providence Friars women's basketball (NCAA) (1974–present); Providence Friars women's volleyball (NCAA) (1977–present); Providence Friars men's basketball (NCAA) (1955–1972)

Alumni Hall is the on-campus basketball gymnasium at Providence College in Providence, Rhode Island, United States. It was built in 1955 and was the home court for the school's men's basketball program until 1972. The gymnasium has hosted the Providence College women's basketball team since its inception in 1974.

== History ==
Alumni Hall was built in 1955 to suit the needs of the men's basketball program, under the direction of then-college president Rev. Robert J. Slavin, O.P. The team had previously played either off-campus or in a small gymnasium in the basement of Bishop Harkins Hall (a space which would later become the Blackfriars Theatre). It was dedicated to those alumni who had fought in World War II.

For its first seventeen years, it was the home of the burgeoning men's basketball program, which won the 1961 and 1963 NIT championships under coach Joe Mullaney. In 1972, the men's team moved to the new Providence Civic Center downtown, which later became the Dunkin' Donuts Center. In 2001, the gymnasium was named the Mullaney Gymnasium in honor of Mullaney.

In 1974, the women's basketball team began playing there, where they currently reside. The gymnasium has hosted several Women's NIT games throughout its tenure, as well as the 1983 (inaugural) and 1993 Big East women's basketball tournaments.

On October 31, 2009, the men's basketball team played an exhibition game against Merrimack, its first game in Alumni Hall since January 22, 1978, an exhibition game against the Soviet national basketball team.

Until 2012, the arena sat 2,620 fans. Bleacher seating was available on the main level, with theater seating in the upper level. When the men's team played there, Alumni Hall's upper level was traditionally reserved for season ticket holders while the bleacher seating was generally filled with students.

On February 21, 2018, the final 13:03 of the second half in a Providence-Seton Hall men's game was played at Alumni Hall the following day after the court at the Dunkin' Donuts Center had slippery conditions due to the ice underneath the court, used for Providence Bruins games, melting. With Alumni Hall only seating 2,620 fans, and the Dunkin' Donuts Center seating 11,000+, only students and staff were allowed to attend the game.

In 2020, the Providence Friars announced they would play all home games at Alumni Hall with zero spectators. This was due to the Dunkin' Donuts Center becoming a testing site during the COVID-19 pandemic. It would mark the first time the Friars would play all home games at Alumni Hall since 1972.

The gymnasium underwent renovations in 2012, removing the bleacher seating in favor of theater seating throughout the lower level, reducing the capacity for basketball to 1,854. Video boards were also installed, while the gymnasium became air-conditioned for the first time in its history.

== Other uses ==
The upper levels of the building now house the athletic department's offices. These spaces, along with the locker rooms and playing surface of the gymnasium were renovated in the mid-2000s, including an expansion to house a new training room, the Canavan Sports Medicine Center, on the Cumberland Street side of the building. In 2007, the Concannon Fitness Center opened on the other side of Alumni Hall, along with a glass lobby (the Ruane Atrium) which serves as common entrance for the fitness center, the Slavin Center, Alumni Hall, and the adjacent Peterson Recreation Center, including Taylor Natatorium.

There is a cafeteria in the bottom level which is connected to the Slavin Center student union building. The cafeteria was expanded in 1997, including an area formerly used as a mini-mall. For many years the Alumni Hall cafeteria was known as the "day hops" cafeteria. At one time half of the student body commuted to campus every day and most ate their lunch and spent between class time in this cafeteria (commuter students were popularly known as "day hops"). A cafeteria for the on-campus resident students operated and continues to operate out of Raymond Hall. Alumni Hall also housed the on campus post office. It served as the campus student union and was the center of campus activity prior to the construction of the Slavin Center. A part-time Hospital Trust Bank branch also operated near the ticket sales area in the foyer of Alumni Hall. The Slavin Center which is conjoined with Alumni hall opened in 1971 as the student union and many of the Alumni Hall facilities were relocated to that building.

The Alumni Hall cafeteria was also the site for many on-campus mixers during the 1950s, 1960s and early 1970s when girls from all-women Catholic colleges in the region like Emmanuel College, Anna Maria College, Regis College, Salve Regina University, Albertus Magnus College and Saint Joseph College would be bussed in for the dances. The school went co-ed in 1972. The hall also hosted many concerts that featured such musical artists as The Association, the Young Rascals, The Hollies, Dionne Warwick, Flip Wilson and the Happenings, Judy Collins and many other popular artists of the day. The upper floors of Alumni Hall housed the studios of WDOM AM & FM which were the campus radio stations staffed by students.

== Gallery ==
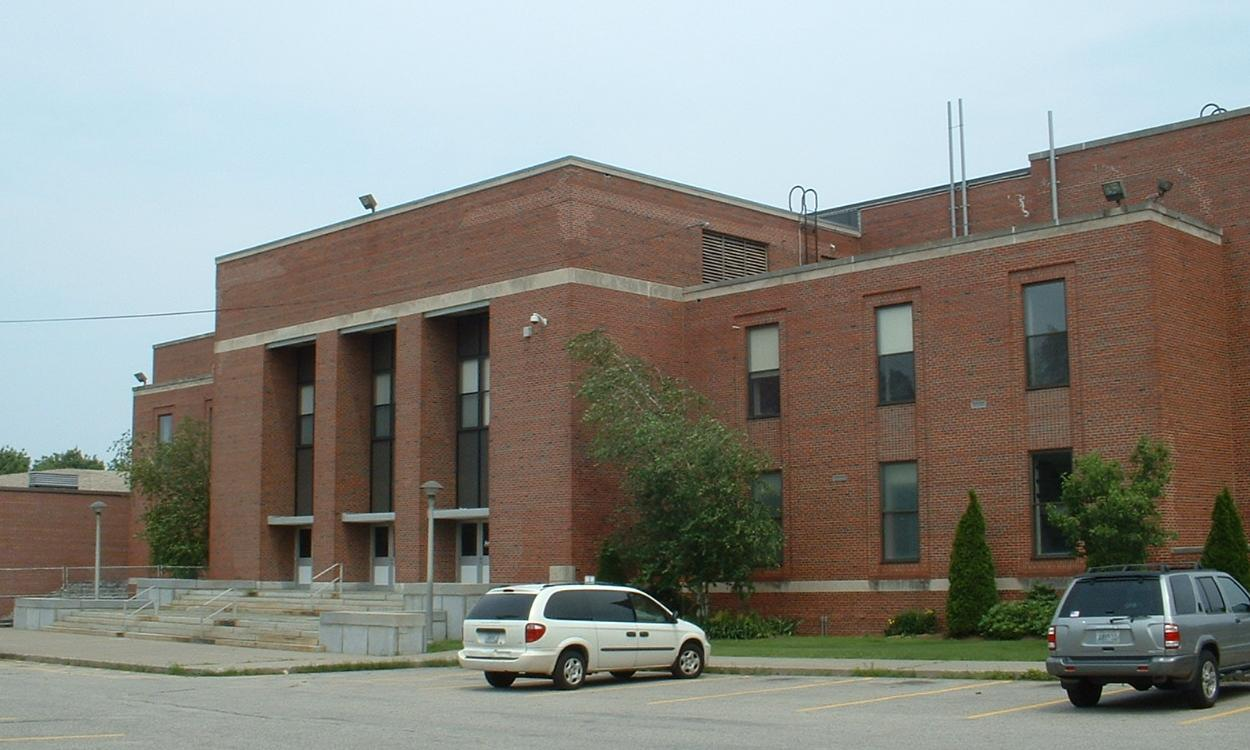
Cumberland St. side of building, prior to mid-2000s renovations

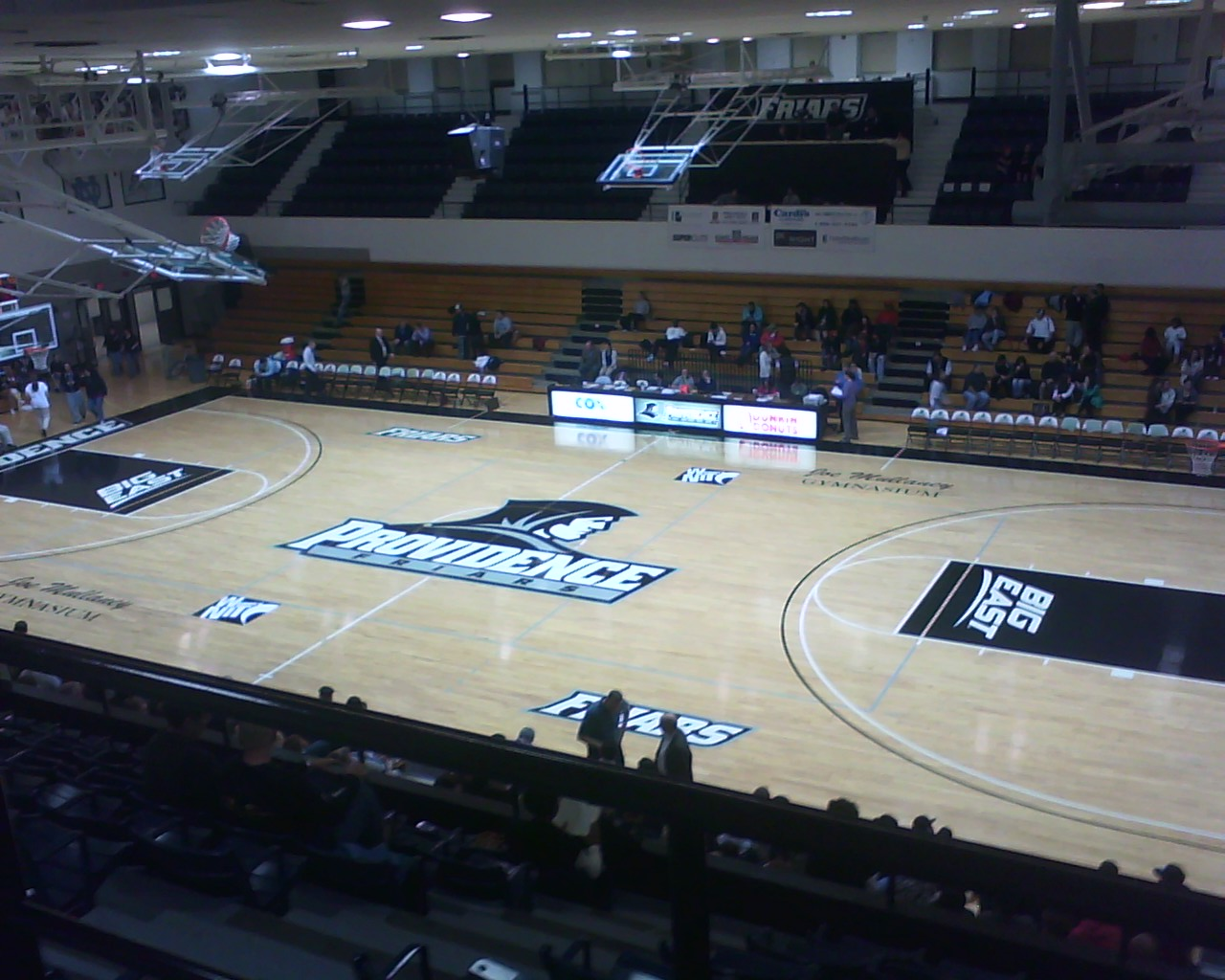
Interior of gymnasium, prior to 2012 renovations

== See also ==
- List of NCAA Division I basketball arenas
