= Sullivan Athletic Center =

Athletic facility in Chicago, Illinois

Coordinates: 41.923901°N 87.653167°W

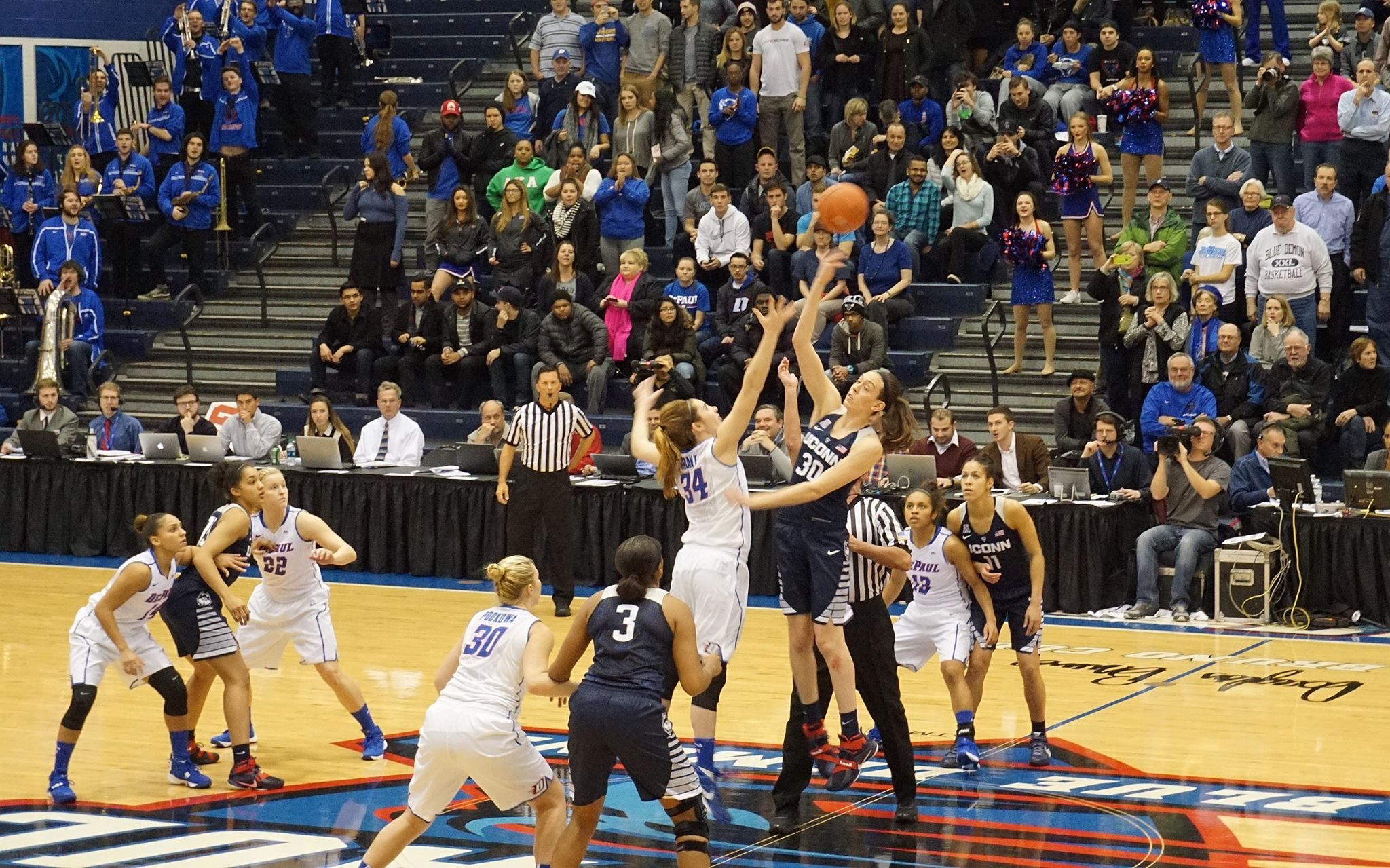
- Interactive map of Sullivan Athletic Center
- Location: 2323 N Sheffield; Chicago, IL 60604 USA
- Owner: DePaul University
- Operator: DePaul University
- Capacity: 3,000

Construction
- Groundbreaking: 1999
- Opened: May 2000

Tenant
- DePaul Blue Demons (NCAA) (2000–present)

The Sullivan Athletic Center is an athletic facility on the campus of DePaul University in Chicago, Illinois. The facility houses McGrath-Phillips Arena, a 3,000-seat multi-purpose arena.

It is the home arena for the women's volleyball team and part-time home for the women's basketball team. The facility also serves as the practice facility for the men's basketball team.

== History ==
The Sullivan Center, originally named the DePaul Athletic Center, opened in 2000 and was renamed in 2006. It replaced Alumni Hall. The DePaul Blue Demons athletic department is housed in the Sullivan Center.

== McGrath-Phillips Arena ==
McGrath-Phillips Arena located in the Sullivan Athletic Center was the part-time home of the DePaul men's basketball team from 2000 to 2017 before moving to Wintrust Arena. It remains the practice facility for the team. From 2000 to 2017, it was the full-time home of the DePaul women's basketball team and now serves as the part-time home for the women's team.

The women's volleyball team has played all its home games at McGrath-Phillips since its opening in 2000.

McGrath-Phillips Arena served as the host of the 2002 Conference USA women's basketball tournament, 2007 National Invitation Tournament and 2019 College Basketball Invitational Tournament.

In 2010, the court in McGrath-Phillips was named after the longtime coach of the women's basketball team, Doug Bruno.

== See also ==
- DePaul Blue Demons
