= 2015–16 IPFW Mastodons women's basketball team =

American college basketball season

2015–16 Fort Wayne Mastodons women's basketball
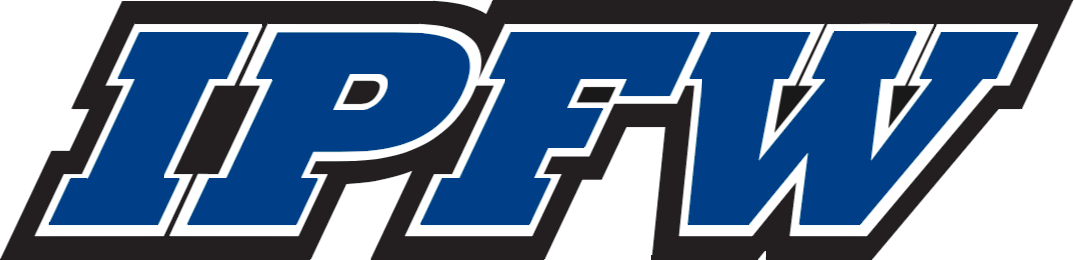
- Conference: The Summit League
- Record: 7–23 (2–13 The Summit)
- Head coach: Chris Paul (9th season)
- Assistant coaches: Kip Jones; Marcie Alberts; Andrea Williams
- Home arena: Hilliard Gates Sports Center; Allen County War Memorial Coliseum

2015–16 Summit League women's basketball standings
	Conf.				Overall
Team	W		L	PCT	W		L	PCT
South Dakota	15	–	1	.938	32	–	6	.842
South Dakota State †	13	–	3	.813	27	–	7	.794
IUPUI	11	–	5	.688	21	–	11	.656
Oral Roberts	10	–	6	.625	14	–	16	.467
Western Illinois	8	–	8	.500	16	–	16	.500
Omaha	7	–	9	.438	15	–	15	.500
IPFW	3	–	13	.188	7	–	23	.233
Denver	3	–	13	.188	5	–	25	.167
North Dakota State	2	–	14	.125	7	–	22	.241
† 2016 Summit League Tournament winner As of April 2, 2016; Rankings from AP Poll

The 2015–16 Fort Wayne Mastodons women's basketball team represented Indiana University–Purdue University Fort Wayne during the 2015–16 NCAA Division I women's basketball season. The Mastodons, led by ninth-year head coach Chris Paul, played their home games at the Hilliard Gates Sports Center in Fort Wayne, Indiana, with one home game at the Allen County War Memorial Coliseum. They were members of The Summit League. They finished the season 7–23, 2–13 in Summit League play, to finish in a tie for seventh place. They lost in the quarterfinals of The Summit League women's tournament to South Dakota State.

At the end of the season, head coach Chris Paul's contract was not renewed. He posted a record of 125–195 in nine seasons.

== Roster ==
2015–16 IPFW Mastodons women's basketball team
Players
Coaches

Pos.	#	Name	Height	Year	Previous school	Hometown
F	2	KeShyra McCarver	5 ft 10 in (1.78 m)	So	Whitmer	Toledo, OH
G	3	Courtney Ogle	6 ft 0 in (1.83 m)	Sr	Columbus East	Columbus, IN
G	4	Kamilah Carter	5 ft 4 in (1.63 m)	Sr	Pioneer; Owens CC	Ann Arbor, MI
G	10	Josie Fisher	5 ft 7 in (1.7 m)	Fr	Homestead	Fort Wayne, IN
G	13	De'Jour Young	5 ft 7 in (1.7 m)	Fr	Concordia Lutheran	Fort Wayne, IN
F	15	Selena Lozada	6 ft 2 in (1.88 m)	Jr	Western Guilford; Guilford Technical CC	Perth Amboy, NJ
F	21	Isis Parker	6 ft 0 in (1.83 m)	Fr	Solon	Cleveland, OH
G	23	Peyton Fallis	5 ft 10 in (1.78 m)	Fr	Heritage Christian	Indianapolis, IN
G	31	Rachel Rinehart	5 ft 8 in (1.73 m)	Jr	Angola	Angola, IN
F	33	Allyson Bunch	5 ft 10 in (1.78 m)	So	Columbus East	Columbus, IN
F	35	Hannah Lee	6 ft 2 in (1.88 m)	RS Jr	Terre Haute South	Terre Haute, IN
F	40	Keanna Gary	6 ft 1 in (1.85 m)	RS So	Leo	Fort Wayne, IN
F	42	Alexis Richards	6 ft 1 in (1.85 m)	Sr	Miami Palmetto	Miami, FL

Head coach

- Chris Paul (Saint Francis (Indiana))

Assistant coach(es)

- Kip Jones (Purdue)
- Marcie Alberts (Ohio State)
- Andrea Williams (Edinboro)

Legend

- (C) Team captain
- (S) Suspended
- (I) Ineligible
- (W) Walk-on
- Injured
- Current redshirt

Roster
Last update: August 24, 2024

== Schedule ==
Date time, TV	Rank^{#}	Opponent^{#}	Result	Record	Site (attendance) city, state
Exhibition
November 4, 2015*; 7:00 p.m.		Goshen	W 82–67		Hilliard Gates Sports Center (551); Fort Wayne, IN
Non-conference regular season
November 13, 2015*; 11:00 a.m.		Trine	W 82–62	1–0	Hilliard Gates Sports Center (1,024); Fort Wayne, IN
November 16, 2015*; 5:00 p.m.		Grace (IN)	W 91–39	2–0	Hilliard Gates Sports Center (647); Fort Wayne, IN
November 19, 2015*; 7:00 p.m.		Kent State	W 86–68	3–0	Hilliard Gates Sports Center (539); Fort Wayne, IN
November 21, 2015*; 7:00 p.m.		USC Upstate	L 81–84	3–1	Memorial Coliseum (282); Fort Wayne, IN
November 24, 2015*; 7:00 p.m.		Indiana	L 72–79	3–2	Hilliard Gates Sports Center (954); Fort Wayne, IN
November 29, 2015*; 2:00 p.m.		Western Michigan	L 48–70	3–3	Hilliard Gates Sports Center (753); Fort Wayne, IN
December 3, 2015*; 11:00 a.m.		at Ohio	L 52–79	3–4	Convocation Center (1,623); Athens, OH
December 5, 2015*; 7:00 p.m., ESPN3		at Northern Kentucky	L 64–77	3–5	BB&T Arena (1,049); Highland Heights, KY
December 9, 2015*; 5:00 p.m., ESPN3		at Detroit	L 63–64	3–6	Calihan Hall (507); Detroit, MI
December 12, 2015*; 11:00 a.m.		Chicago State	W 62–51	4–6	Hilliard Gates Sports Center (410); Fort Wayne, IN
December 20, 2015*; 2:00 p.m.		at Fairfield	L 62–74	4–7	Alumni Hall (121); Fairfield, CT
December 22, 2015*; 12:00 p.m., ESPN3		at Oakland	L 74–81	4–8	Athletics Center O'rena (457); Rochester, MI
December 28, 2015*; 8:00 p.m., ESPN3		at Milwaukee	L 60–73	4–9	Klotsche Center (478); Milwaukee, WI
The Summit League regular season
January 1, 2016; 7:00 p.m.		IUPUI	L 50–69	4–10 (0–1)	Hilliard Gates Sports Center (713); Fort Wayne, IN
January 7, 2016; 7:00 p.m.		Western Illinois	L 74–78	4–11 (0–2)	Hilliard Gates Sports Center (498); Fort Wayne, IN
January 9, 2016; 3:00 p.m.		at Denver	L 50–53	4–12 (0–3)	Magness Arena (287); Denver, CO
January 13, 2016; 7:00 p.m.		South Dakota State	L 42–61	4–13 (0–4)	Hilliard Gates Sports Center (450); Fort Wayne, IN
January 16, 2016; 3:00 p.m.		at Oral Roberts	L 59–61	4–14 (0–5)	Mabee Center (770); Tulsa, OK
January 21, 2016; 8:00 p.m.		at South Dakota	L 60–92	4–15 (0–6)	DakotaDome (1,453); Vermillion, SD
January 23, 2016; 3:00 p.m.		at North Dakota State	L 85–94	4–16 (0–7)	Bentson Bunker Fieldhouse (459); Fargo, ND
January 28, 2016; 7:00 p.m.		Nebraska–Omaha	L 58–60	4–17 (0–8)	Hilliard Gates Sports Center (622); Fort Wayne, IN
January 30, 2016; 2:00 p.m.		Denver	W 61–49	5–17 (1–8)	Hilliard Gates Sports Center (797); Fort Wayne, IN
February 4, 2016; 8:00 p.m.		at Western Illinois	L 87–88	5–18 (1–9)	Western Hall (511); Macomb, IL
February 11, 2016; 8:00 p.m.		at Nebraska–Omaha	L 64–71	5–19 (1–10)	Baxter Arena (758); Omaha, NE
February 13, 2016; 3:00 p.m.		at South Dakota State	L 64–92	5–20 (1–11)	Frost Arena (3,209); Brookings, SD
February 17, 2016; 7:00 p.m.		Oral Roberts	W 54–48	6–20 (2–11)	Hilliard Gates Sports Center (481); Fort Wayne, IN
February 21, 2016; 2:00 p.m., HTSN		at IUPUI	L 52–63	6–21 (2–12)	The Jungle (539); Indianapolis, IN
February 25, 2016; 7:00 p.m.		South Dakota	L 63–90	6–22 (2–13)	Hilliard Gates Sports Center (546); Fort Wayne, IN
February 27, 2016; 3:00 p.m.		North Dakota State	W 85–69	7–22 (3–13)	Hilliard Gates Sports Center (683); Fort Wayne, IN
The Summit League women's tournament
March 5, 2016; 3:30 p.m., MidcoSN		vs. South Dakota State; Quarterfinals	L 60–80	7–23	Denny Sanford Premier Center (3,209); Sioux Falls, SD
*Non-conference game. ^{#}Rankings from AP poll. (#) Tournament seedings in parentheses. All times are in Eastern.
