= 1997 Cleveland Rockers season =

- Head coach: Linda Hill-MacDonald
- Arena: Gund Arena

Results
- Record: 15–13 (.536)
- Place: 4th (Eastern)
- Playoff finish: Did not qualify

The 1997 WNBA season was the inaugural season for the Cleveland Rockers.

== Transactions ==
=== WNBA allocation draft ===
| Player | Nationality | School/Team/Country |
|---|---|---|
| Janice Braxton | United States | NC State |
| Michelle Edwards | United States | Maryland |

=== WNBA elite draft ===
| Round | Pick | Player | Nationality | School/Team/Country |
|---|---|---|---|---|
| 1 | 2 | Isabelle Fijalkowski | France | Colorado |
| 2 | 10 | Lynette Woodard | United States | Kansas |

=== WNBA draft ===
| Round | Pick | Player | Nationality | School/Team/Country |
|---|---|---|---|---|
| 1 | 4 | Eva Němcová | Czechoslovakia | Bourges (France) |
| 2 | 13 | Merlakia Jones | United States | Florida |
| 3 | 20 | Tina Nicholson | United States | Penn State |
| 4 | 29 | Anita Maxwell | United States | New Mexico State |

=== Transactions ===
| Date | Transaction |
|---|---|
| January 22, 1997 | Drafted Janice Braxton and Michelle Edwards in the 1997 WNBA Allocation Draft |
| February 27, 1997 | Drafted Isabelle Fijalkowski and Lynette Woodard in the 1997 WNBA Elite Draft |
| April 28, 1997 | Drafted Eva Němcová, Merlakia Jones, Tina Nicholson and Anita Maxwell in the 1997 WNBA draft |
| May 6, 1997 | Hired Linda Hill-MacDonald as Head Coach |

== Roster ==
1997 Cleveland Rockers roster
Players
Coaches

| Pos. | No. | Nat. | Name | Height | Weight | DOB | From | Yrs |
|---|---|---|---|---|---|---|---|---|
| G | 20 | (United States) | Alberts, Marcie | 5' 4" (1.63m) | | 1975-04-12 | Ohio State | R |
| G | 14 | (United States) | Boucek, Jenny | 5' 8" (1.73m) | 130 lb (59kg) | 1973-12-20 | Virginia | R |
| F | 8 | (United States) | Braxton, Janice | 6' 3" (1.91m) | 178 lb (81kg) | 1962-06-07 | Louisiana Tech | R |
| F | 34 | (United States) | Brown, Rushia | 6' 2" (1.88m) | 175 lb (79kg) | 1972-05-05 | Furman | R |
| G | 44 | (United States) | Edwards, Michelle | 5' 9" (1.75m) | 150 lb (68kg) | 1966-03-06 | Iowa | R |
| F/C | 13 | (France) | Fijalkowski, Isabelle | 6' 5" (1.96m) | 200 lb (91kg) | 1972-05-23 | Colorado | R |
| G | 31 | (United States) | Johnson, Adrienne | 5' 10" (1.78m) | 154 lb (70kg) | 1974-02-05 | Ohio State | R |
| G | 25 | (United States) | Jones, Merlakia | 5' 10" (1.78m) | 147 lb (67kg) | 1973-06-21 | Florida | R |
| F | 40 | (United States) | Maxwell, Anita | | | 1974-04-07 | New Mexico State | R |
| F | 6 | (Czechoslovakia) | Němcová, Eva | 6' 3" (1.91m) | 178 lb (81kg) | 1972-12-03 | | R |
| G | 11 | (United States) | Nicholson, Tina | 5' 2" (1.57m) | 146 lb (66kg) | 1973-09-27 | Penn State | R |
| G | 4 | (United States) | Woodard, Lynette | 6' 0" (1.83m) | 160 lb (73kg) | 1959-08-12 | Kansas | R |

Head coach
(United States) Linda Hill-MacDonald (West Chester)
Assistant coaches
(United States) Mike Wilhelm

Legend

- (C) Team captain
- (DP) Unsigned draft pick
- (FA) Free agent
- (S) Suspended
- Injured

== Schedule ==
=== Regular season ===
1997 game log
Total: 15–13 (Home: 10–5; Road: 7–9)
June: 1–3 (Home: 1–2; Road: 0–1)

| Game | Date | Team | Score | High points | High rebounds | High assists | Location Attendance | Record |
|---|---|---|---|---|---|---|---|---|
| 1 | June 21 | Houston | L 56–76 | Isabelle Fijalkowski (12) | Lynette Woodard (7) | Braxton; Edwards; Nicholson; Němcová (2) | Gund Arena | 0–1 |
| 2 | June 26 | Utah | W 74–63 | Isabelle Fijalkowski (21) | Janice Braxton (14) | Michelle Edwards (8) | Gund Arena | 1–1 |
| 3 | June 28 | Phoenix | L 63–68 | Michelle Edwards (14) | Janice Braxton (12) | Fijalkowski; Němcová (5) | Gund Arena | 1–2 |
| 4 | June 29 | @ Charlotte | W 67–44 | Isabelle Fijalkowski (15) | Isabelle Fijalkowski (9) | Braxton; Boucek; Woodard (3) | Charlotte Coliseum | 1–3 |

July : 9–5 (Home: 4–2; Road: 5–3)

| Game | Date | Team | Score | High points | High rebounds | High assists | Location Attendance | Record |
|---|---|---|---|---|---|---|---|---|
| 5 | July 3 | Los Angeles | L 62–74 | Janice Braxton (15) | Janice Braxton (10) | Boucek; Němcová (3) | Gund Arena | 1–4 |
| 6 | July 6 | @ Sacramento | L 67–70 | Merlakia Jones (15) | Isabelle Fijalkowski (9) | Tina Nicholson (5) | ARCO Arena | 1–5 |
| 7 | July 7 | @ Los Angeles | W 81–70 | Braxton; Woodard (20) | Lynette Woodard (11) | Lynette Woodard (6) | Great Western Forum | 2–5 |
| 8 | July 10 | Sacramento | W 77–61 | Janice Braxton (19) | Janice Braxton (11) | Isabelle Fijalkowski (4) | Gund Arena | 3–5 |
| 9 | July 12 | @ Charlotte | L 43–72 | Eva Němcová (11) | Braxton; Brown (8) | Němcová; Woodard (3) | Charlotte Coliseum | 3–6 |
| 10 | July 14 | New York | L 57–68 | Janice Braxton (18) | Isabelle Fijalkowski (5) | Tina Nicholson (9) | Gund Arena | 3–7 |
| 11 | July 15 | @ New York | L 59–76 | Lynette Woodard (12) | Eva Němcová (7) | Fijalkowski; Woodard (3) | Madison Square Garden | 3–8 |
| 12 | July 17 | Charlotte | W 65–47 | Němcová; Woodard (14) | Isabelle Fijalkowski (11) | Isabelle Fijalkowski (6) | Gund Arena | 4–8 |
| 13 | July 19 | Utah | W 95–68 | Janice Braxton (19) | Lynette Woodard (11) | Nicholson; Woodard (6) | Gund Arena | 5–8 |
| 14 | July 23 | @ Los Angeles | W 89–85 | Isabelle Fijalkowski (24) | Janice Braxton (6) | Michelle Edwards (6) | Great Western Forum | 6–8 |
| 15 | July 26 | @ Utah | W 77–66 | Rushia Brown (17) | Isabelle Fijalkowski (10) | Eva Němcová (4) | Delta Center | 7–8 |
| 16 | July 28 | @ Phoenix | W 76–64 | Eva Němcová (22) | Janice Braxton (10) | Edwards; Fijalkowski (5) | America West Arena | 8–8 |
| 17 | July 29 | @ Houston | W 73–64 | Eva Němcová (18) | Janice Braxton (7) | Edwards; Fijalkowski (5) | The Summit | 9–8 |
| 18 | July 31 | Phoenix | W 79–67 | Eva Němcová (17) | Edwards; Woodard (5) | Michelle Edwards (6) | Gund Arena | 10–8 |

August : 7–6 (Home: 5–1; Road: 2–5)

| Game | Date | Team | Score | High points | High rebounds | High assists | Location Attendance | Record |
|---|---|---|---|---|---|---|---|---|
| 19 | August 2 | Sacramento | W 72–51 | Isabelle Fijalkowski (22) | Edwards; Fijalkowski (9) | Michelle Edwards (7) | Gund Arena | 11–8 |
| 20 | August 5 | Houston | L 66–76 | Michelle Edwards (17) | Janice Braxton (6) | Michelle Edwards (7) | Gund Arena | 11–9 |
| 21 | August 7 | Los Angeles | L 84–87 (2OT) | Eva Němcová (22) | Isabelle Fijalkowski (10) | Edwards; Woodard (5) | Gund Arena | 11–10 |
| 22 | August 11 | @ Utah | W 74–59 | Merlakia Jones (19) | Rushia Brown (11) | Michelle Edwards (6) | Delta Center | 12–10 |
| 23 | August 12 | @ Sacramento | L 76–81 | Eva Němcová (16) | Brown; Fijalkowski (9) | Isabelle Fijalkowski (5) | ARCO Arena | 12–11 |
| 24 | August 14 | @ Phoenix | L 55–61 | Merlakia Jones (12) | Brown; Němcová (8) | Michelle Edwards (7) | America West Arena | 12–12 |
| 25 | August 17 | Charlotte | W 81–49 | Eva Němcová (21) | Janice Braxton (15) | Braxton; Němcová (4) | Gund Arena | 13–12 |
| 26 | August 21 | @ Houston | W 76–75 | Michelle Edwards (15) | Braxton; Woodard (5) | Braxton; Fijalkowski (3) | The Summit | 14–12 |
| 27 | August 23 | New York | W 72–71 | Janice Braxton (19) | Janice Braxton (8) | Edwards; Woodard (5) | Gund Arena | 15–12 |
| 28 | August 24 | @ New York | L 72–79 (OT) | Janice Braxton (15) | Braxton; Fijalkowski (4) | Eva Němcová (4) | Madison Square Garden | 15–13 |

1997 season schedule

=== Season standings ===
| Eastern Conference | W | L | PCT | Conf. | GB |
|---|---|---|---|---|---|
| Houston Comets ^{x} | 18 | 10 | .643 | 6–6 | – |
| New York Liberty ^{x} | 17 | 11 | .607 | 8–4 | 1.0 |
| Charlotte Sting ^{x} | 15 | 13 | .536 | 5–7 | 3.0 |
| Cleveland Rockers ^{o} | 15 | 13 | .536 | 5–7 | 3.0 |

== Statistics ==
Legend
| GP | Games played | GS | Games started | MPG | Minutes per game | RPG | Rebounds per game |
| APG | Assists per game | SPG | Steals per game | BPG | Blocks per game | PPG | Points per game |
| FG% | Field-goal percentage | 3P% | 3-point field-goal percentage | FT% | Free-throw percentage | TO | Turnovers per game |
| PF | Fouls per game | | Team leader | | League leader |

=== Regular season ===
| Player | GP | GS | MPG | FG% | 3P% | FT% | RPG | APG | SPG | BPG | PPG |
|---|---|---|---|---|---|---|---|---|---|---|---|
| Eva Němcová | 28 | 28 | 33.7 | .473 | .435 | .855 | 3.9 | 2.4 | 1.4 | 0.3 | 13.7 |
| Janice Braxton | 25 | 24 | 32.9 | .417 | .500 | .768 | 7.6 | 2.0 | 1.4 | 1.1 | 11.5 |
| Michelle Edwards | 20 | 14 | 31.1 | .447 | .240 | .523 | 3.5 | 4.5 | 1.8 | 0.2 | 10.2 |
| Isabelle Fijalkowski | 28 | 28 | 28.7 | .508 | .250 | .786 | 5.6 | 2.4 | 0.6 | 0.6 | 11.9 |
| Lynette Woodard | 28 | 27 | 25.4 | .401 | .000 | .672 | 4.1 | 2.4 | 1.6 | 0.4 | 7.8 |
| Merlakia Jones | 28 | 1 | 21.0 | .402 | .417 | .714 | 2.9 | 0.9 | 0.8 | 0.1 | 8.2 |
| Rushia Brown | 28 | 3 | 18.3 | .520 | N/A | .734 | 4.0 | 0.7 | 1.2 | 0.5 | 6.3 |
| Tina Nicholson | 24 | 14 | 11.4 | .409 | .375 | .600 | 0.4 | 1.8 | 0.5 | 0.0 | 2.0 |
| Jenny Boucek | 10 | 1 | 11.2 | .467 | .000 | .571 | 1.0 | 0.9 | 0.6 | 0.0 | 1.8 |
| Adrienne Johnson | 25 | 2 | 7.8 | .379 | .500 | .778 | 0.9 | 0.4 | 0.2 | 0.0 | 2.1 |
| Anita Maxwell | 9 | 0 | 7.0 | .320 | N/A | .375 | 1.3 | 0.9 | 0.4 | 0.0 | 2.1 |
| Marcie Alberts | 5 | 0 | 6.0 | .000 | .000 | N/A | 0.2 | 0.6 | 0.4 | 0.0 | 0.0 |

^{‡}Waived/Released during the season
^{†}Traded during the season
^{≠}Acquired during the season

- Janice Braxton ranked sixth in the WNBA in total rebounds with 189
- Janice Braxton tied for fifth in the WNBA in blocks with 28.
- Michelle Edwards ranked eighth in the WNBA in assists with 89.
- Isabelle Fijalkowski ranked second in the WNBA in Field Goal Percentage (.508)
- Isabelle Fijalkowski ranked eighth in the WNBA in Free Throw Pct with .786
- Eva Nemcova ranked fourth in the WNBA in Field Goal Percentage (.473)
- Eva Nemcova ranked fourth in the WNBA in Free Throw Pct with .855
- Eva Nemcova ranked tenth in the WNBA in field goals with 138.
- Eva Nemcova ranked eighth in the WNBA in points with 384 points.
- Eva Nemcova ranked seventh in the WNBA in minutes per game with 33.7
- Eva Nemcova ranked eighth in the WNBA in points per game with 13.7

== Awards and honors ==
- Janice Braxton, Ranked second in the WNBA (tied), Defensive Rebounds, 151
- Isabelle Fijalkowski: Led WNBA, Personal Fouls, 129
- Eva Nemcova: Led WNBA, 3-Pt Field Goal Percentage, .435
