= 2015–16 Omaha Mavericks women's basketball team =

Intercollegiate basketball season

2015–16 Omaha Mavericks women's basketball
- Conference: The Summit League
- Record: 15–15 (7–9 The Summit)
- Head coach: Brittany Lange (3rd season)
- Assistant coaches: Lee Aduddell; Rodney Rogan; Kirk Walker
- Home arena: Baxter Arena

2015–16 Summit League women's basketball standings
	Conf.				Overall
Team	W		L	PCT	W		L	PCT
South Dakota	15	–	1	.938	32	–	6	.842
South Dakota State †	13	–	3	.813	27	–	7	.794
IUPUI	11	–	5	.688	21	–	11	.656
Oral Roberts	10	–	6	.625	14	–	16	.467
Western Illinois	8	–	8	.500	16	–	16	.500
Omaha	7	–	9	.438	15	–	15	.500
IPFW	3	–	13	.188	7	–	23	.233
Denver	3	–	13	.188	5	–	25	.167
North Dakota State	2	–	14	.125	7	–	22	.241
† 2016 Summit League Tournament winner As of April 2, 2016; Rankings from AP Poll

The 2015–16 Omaha Mavericks men's basketball team represented the University of Nebraska Omaha during the 2015–16 NCAA Division I women's basketball season. The Mavericks, led by third-year head coach Brittany Lange, played their home games at Baxter Arena and were members of The Summit League. They finished the season 15–15, 7–9 in Summit League play, to finish in sixth place. They advanced to the semifinals of the Summit League women's tournament where they lost to South Dakota State.

== Roster ==
2015–16 Omaha Mavericks women's basketball team
Players
Coaches

Pos.	#	Name	Height	Year	Hometown
G	1	Kalen Phillips	5 ft 9 in (1.75 m)	Fr	Ellisville, MS
G/F	3	Sara Echelberry	6 ft 2 in (1.88 m)	Fr	Conway Springs, KS
G	5	Amber Vidal	5 ft 6 in (1.68 m)	Fr	San Antonio, TX
C	10	Courtney Vaccher	6 ft 2 in (1.88 m)	RS Fr	Yorba Linda, CA
G	14	Marissa Preston	5 ft 8 in (1.73 m)	RS So	Kansas City, MO
G	21	Abi Lujan	5 ft 11 in (1.8 m)	Jr	Brighton, CO
F	22	Mikaela Shaw	6 ft 0 in (1.83 m)	Jr	Deweese, NE
G	24	Bobbi Beckwith	5 ft 10 in (1.78 m)	Sr	Albion, NE
C	30	Caroline Hogue	6 ft 0 in (1.83 m)	Fr	Little Rock, AR
C	32	Vanessa Barajas	6 ft 3 in (1.91 m)	So	Gilbert, AZ
G	33	Remy Davenport	5 ft 8 in (1.73 m)	So	Blue Springs, MO
G	34	Ellie Brecht	5 ft 11 in (1.8 m)	Fr	Sioux Falls, SD
F	40	Jay Bridgeman	6 ft 1 in (1.85 m)	Fr	Omaha, NE
G/F	43	Moriah Dapprich	6 ft 0 in (1.83 m)	RS So	Branson, MO
G/F	44	Michaela Dapprich	5 ft 10 in (1.78 m)	RS Jr	Branson, MO

Head coach

- Brittany Lange (Iowa State)

Assistant coach(es)

- Lee Aduddell (Abilene Christian)
- Rodney Rogan (Millsaps)
- Kirk Walker (Morningside)

Legend

- (C) Team captain
- (S) Suspended
- (I) Ineligible
- (W) Walk-on
- Injured
- Current redshirt

Roster
Last update: June 28, 2024

== Schedule ==
Date time, TV	Rank^{#}	Opponent^{#}	Result	Record	Site (attendance) city, state
Exhibition
11/04/2015*; 7:00 p.m.		Washburn	L 56–61		Baxter Arena (277); Omaha, NE
11/08/2015*; 2:00 p.m.		Peru State	W 107–64		Baxter Arena (227); Omaha, NE
Non-conference regular season
11/14/2015*; 2:00 p.m.		UCF	W 75–60	1–0	Baxter Arena (846); Omaha, NE
11/17/2015*; 7:00 p.m., FSNOR+/FCSC		at North Dakota	L 52–67	1–1	Betty Engelstad Sioux Center (1,456); Grand Forks, ND
11/21/2015*; 6:00 p.m., ESPN3		at Indiana State	W 51–50	2–1	Hulman Center (1,772); Terre Haute, IN
11/24/2015*; 7:00 p.m.		Waldorf	W 97–32	3–1	Baxter Arena (462); Omaha, NE
11/27/2015*; 2:00 p.m.		vs. Houston Baptist; UTSA Thanksgiving Classic	L 51–64	3–2	Convocation Center (150); San Antonio, TX
11/29/2015*; 12:00 p.m.		vs. Illinois State; UTSA Thanksgiving Classic	W 60–56	4–2	Convocation Center (159); San Antonio, TX
12/03/2015*; 7:00 p.m., ESPN3		UMKC	W 57–42	5–2	Baxter Arena (655); Omaha, NE
12/06/2015*; 2:00 p.m.		Eastern Illinois	W 76–67	6–2	Baxter Arena (552); Omaha, NE
12/09/2015*; 7:00 p.m.		Midland	W 58–53	7–2	Baxter Arena (564); Omaha, NE
12/13/2015*; 2:00 p.m.		at SIU Edwardsville	L 86–90 ^{OT}	7–3	Vadalabene Center (817); Edwardsville, IL
12/20/2015*; 8:00 p.m.		Creighton	L 46–69	7–4	Baxter Arena (1,362); Omaha, NE
12/22/2015*; 2:00 p.m.		Utah Valley	L 59–74	7–5	Baxter Arena (268); Omaha, NE
The Summit League play
12/30/2015; 7:00 p.m.		North Dakota State	W 77–52	8–5 (1–0)	Baxter Arena (506); Omaha, NE
01/03/2016; 1:00 p.m.		Western Illinois	W 79–66	9–5 (2–0)	Baxter Arena (528); Omaha, NE
01/07/2016; 7:00 p.m., MidcoSN/ESPN3		at South Dakota State	L 58–68	9–6 (2–1)	Frost Arena (1,628); Brookings, SD
01/09/2016; 1:30 p.m., MidcoSN/ESPN3		at South Dakota	L 76–82	9–7 (2–2)	DakotaDome (1,523); Vermillion, SD
01/13/2016; 6:00 p.m.		at IUPUI	L 59–75	9–8 (2–3)	The Jungle (248); Indianapolis, IN
01/17/2016; 2:00 p.m.		Denver	W 67–55	10–8 (3–3)	Baxter Arena (552); Omaha, NE
01/22/2016; 7:00 p.m.		Oral Roberts	L 65–67	10–9 (3–4)	Baxter Arena (743); Omaha, NE
01/28/2016; 6:00 p.m.		at IPFW	W 60–58	11–9 (4–4)	Hilliard Gates Sports Center (622); Fort Wayne, IN
01/30/2016; 4:30 p.m.		at Western Illinois	L 55–74	11–10 (4–5)	Western Hall (801); Macomb, IL
02/04/2016; 7:00 p.m.		South Dakota State	L 47–65	11–11 (4–6)	Baxter Arena (631); Omaha, NE
02/07/2016; 2:00 p.m.		South Dakota	L 55–70	11–12 (4–7)	Baxter Arena (526); Omaha, NE
02/11/2016; 7:00 p.m.		IPFW	W 71–64	12–12 (5–7)	Baxter Arena (758); Omaha, NE
02/14/2016; 2:00 p.m.		at North Dakota State	L 67–74	12–13 (5–8)	Bentson Bunker Fieldhouse (632); Fargo, ND
02/18/2016; 7:00 p.m.		IUPUI	W 57–54	13–13 (6–8)	Baxter Arena (475); Omaha, NE
02/25/2016; 7:00 p.m.		at Oral Roberts	L 58–67	13–14 (6–9)	Mabee Center (767); Tulsa, OK
02/27/2016; 2:00 p.m.		at Denver	W 70–60	14–14 (6–10)	Magness Arena (445); Denver, CO
The Summit League women's tournament
03/06/2016; 2:30 p.m., MidcoSN		vs. IUPUI; Quarterfinals	W 62–51	15–14	Denny Sanford Premier Center (3,172); Sioux Falls, SD
03/06/2016; 2:30 p.m., MidcoSN		vs. South Dakota State; Semifinals	L 58–76	15–15	Denny Sanford Premier Center (7,237); Sioux Falls, SD
*Non-conference game. ^{#}Rankings from AP poll. (#) Tournament seedings in parentheses. All times are in Central.

== See also ==
2015–16 Omaha Mavericks men's basketball team
