= 2015–16 South Dakota Coyotes women's basketball team =

Intercollegiate basketball season

2015–16 South Dakota Coyotes women's basketball

FAU Thanksgiving Tournament Champions The Summit League Regular Season Champions

WNIT Champions
- Conference: Summit League
- Record: 32–6 (15–1 The Summit)
- Head coach: Amy Williams (4th season)
- Assistant coaches: Chuck Love; Tandem Mays; Tom Goehle
- Home arena: DakotaDome

2015–16 Summit League women's basketball standings
	Conf.				Overall
Team	W		L	PCT	W		L	PCT
South Dakota	15	–	1	.938	32	–	6	.842
South Dakota State †	13	–	3	.813	27	–	7	.794
IUPUI	11	–	5	.688	21	–	11	.656
Oral Roberts	10	–	6	.625	14	–	16	.467
Western Illinois	8	–	8	.500	16	–	16	.500
Omaha	7	–	9	.438	15	–	15	.500
IPFW	3	–	13	.188	7	–	23	.233
Denver	3	–	13	.188	5	–	25	.167
North Dakota State	2	–	14	.125	7	–	22	.241
† 2016 Summit League Tournament winner As of April 2, 2016; Rankings from AP Poll

The 2015–16 South Dakota Coyotes women's basketball team represented University of South Dakota in the 2015–16 NCAA Division I women's basketball season. The Coyotes, led by fourth-year head by Amy Williams, played their home games at the DakotaDome and were members of Summit League. They finished the season 32–6, 15–1 in Summit League play to win the Summit League regular season title. They advanced to the championship of the Summit League women's tournament where they lost to their in-state rival South Dakota State. They received an automatic trip to the Women's National Invitation Tournament, where they advanced to the championship game, defeating Florida Gulf Coast.

On April 11, 2016, Amy Williams resigned her position at South Dakota to accept the head coaching position at Nebraska. She finished at South Dakota with a 4-year record of 96–44.

This was the final season for South Dakota women's basketball at the DakotaDome. The Coyotes women's basketball, men's basketball, and women's volleyball teams now play in the Sanford Coyote Sports Center, which opened in August 2016.

== Roster ==
2015–16 South Dakota Coyotes women's basketball team
Players
Coaches

Pos.	#	Name	Height	Year	Previous school	Hometown
G/F	2	Kaitlyn Severyn	6 ft 0 in (1.83 m)	RS Fr	T. F. Riggs HS; South Dakota State	Pierre, SD
G	4	Tia Hemiller	5 ft 8 in (1.73 m)	Sr	Watertown HS	Watertown, SD
G	5	Jasmine Trimboli	5 ft 10 in (1.78 m)	Jr	Cabra Dominican HS; Iowa Western CC	Adelaide, Australia
G	10	Allison Arens	5 ft 9 in (1.75 m)	Fr	Crofton HS	Crofton, NE
G	12	Jaycee Bradley	5 ft 10 in (1.78 m)	Fr	Norfolk HS	Norfolk, NE
G	15	Kelly Stewart	6 ft 0 in (1.83 m)	RS Sr	Amery HS	Amery, WI
F	20	Megan Bonar	6 ft 1 in (1.85 m)	Fr	De Soto HS	Gardner, KS
F	22	Bridget Arens	6 ft 0 in (1.83 m)	Jr	Crofton HS	Crofton, NE
F	24	Madeline Homoly	6 ft 2 in (1.88 m)	Fr	Bishop Miege HS	Kansas City, MO
C	30	Margaret McCloud	6 ft 2 in (1.88 m)	Sr	Stevens HS	Rapid City, SD
G	33	Caitlin Duffy	5 ft 11 in (1.8 m)	RS Jr	St. Thomas More HS; Colorado State	Rapid City, SD
C	34	Kate Liveringhouse	6 ft 1 in (1.85 m)	So	Bellevue West HS	Bellevue, NE
G	35	Nicole Seekamp	5 ft 10 in (1.78 m)	RS Sr	Brighton Secondary	Renmark, South Australia
G	42	Heidi Hoff	5 ft 10 in (1.78 m)	Sr	Brandon Valley HS	Brandon, SD
F	44	Abigail Fogg	6 ft 4 in (1.93 m)	RS Jr	Korah Collegiate HS; American	Sault Ste. Marie, ON

Head coach

- Amy Williams (Nebraska)

Assistant coach(es)

- Chuck Love (Northwestern Oklahoma State)
- Tandem Mays (Tulsa)
- Tom Goehle (Augustana (SD))

Legend

- (C) Team captain
- (S) Suspended
- (I) Ineligible
- (W) Walk-on
- Injured
- Current redshirt

Roster

== Schedule ==
Date time, TV	Rank^{#}	Opponent^{#}	Result	Record	Site (attendance) city, state
Non-conference regular season
11/13/2015*; 6:30 pm		at Utah	L 59–66	0–1	Jon M. Huntsman Center (844); Salt Lake City, UT
11/17/2015*; 7:00 pm, ESPN3		at Northern Iowa	L 43–64	0–2	McLeod Center (1,207); Cedar Falls, IA
11/19/2015*; 7:00 pm, FCS Central		at Kansas State	L 81–84 ^{OT}	0–3	Bramlage Coliseum (3,874); Manhattan, KS
11/23/2015*; 7:00 pm		Marquette	W 97–69	1–3	DakotaDome (1,537); Vermillion, SD
11/27/2015*; 1:30 pm		vs. Appalachian State; FAU Thanksgiving Tournament semifinals	W 87–60	2–3	FAU Arena; Boca Raton, FL
11/28/2015*; 1:30 pm		at Florida Atlantic; FAU Thanksgiving Tournament championship	W 76–53	3–3	FAU Arena (441); Boca Raton, FL
12/03/2015*; 7:00 pm		Drake	W 92–87 ^{OT}	4–3	DakotaDome (1,484); Vermillion, SD
12/05/2015*; 2:00 pm		Portland State	W 103–61	5–3	DakotaDome (1,384); Vermillion, SD
12/08/2015*; 9:00 pm		at San Jose State	W 87–77	6–3	Event Center Arena (217); San Jose, CA
12/12/2015*; 8:00 pm, MidcoSN/ESPN3		Washington	L 64–77	6–4	DakotaDome (2,235); Vermillion, SD
12/17/2015*; 7:00 pm		Dakota Wesleyan	W 94–54	7–4	DakotaDome (1,218); Vermillion, SD
12/19/2015*; 2:00 pm, FSNOR		at North Dakota	W 73–70	8–4	Betty Engelstad Sioux Center (1,532); Grand Forks, ND
12/22/2015*; 7:00 pm		at Illinois	W 85–76	9–4	State Farm Center (1,573); Champaign, IL
The Summit League regular season
01/01/2016; 12:00 pm		Denver	W 85–60	10–4 (1–0)	DakotaDome (1,620); Vermillion, SD
01/06/2016; 7:00 pm		at Oral Roberts	L 56–60	10–5 (1–1)	Mabee Center (736); Tulsa, OK
01/09/2016; 1:30 pm, MidcoSN/ESPN3		Omaha	W 82–76	11–5 (2–1)	DakotaDome (1,523); Vermillion, SD
01/14/2016; 7:00 pm		at North Dakota State	W 96–94 ^{2OT}	12–5 (3–1)	Bentson Bunker Fieldhouse (386); Fargo, ND
01/17/2016; 2:00 pm, MidcoSN/ESPN3		at South Dakota State	W 63–58	13–5 (4–1)	Frost Arena (4,082); Brookings, SD
01/21/2016; 7:00 pm		IPFW	W 92–60	14–5 (5–1)	DakotaDome (1,453); Vermillion, SD
01/23/2016; 1:30 pm, MidcoSN/ESPN3		IUPUI	W 65–59	15–5 (6–1)	DakotaDome (1,523); Vermillion, SD
01/27/2016; 7:00 pm, WIUTV/ESPN3		at Western Illinois	W 102–77	16–5 (7–1)	Western Hall (644); Macomb, IL
01/30/2016; 4:30 pm, MidcoSN/ESPN3		North Dakota State	W 80–54	17–5 (8–1)	DakotaDome (1,645); Vermillion, SD
02/05/2016; 8:00 pm		at Denver	W 79–33	18–5 (9–1)	Magness Arena (420); Denver, CO
02/07/2016; 2:00 pm		at Omaha	W 70–55	19–5 (10–1)	Baxter Arena (526); Omaha, NE
02/13/2016; 2:00 pm		Oral Roberts	W 71–48	20–5 (11–1)	DakotaDome (1,371); Vermillion, SD
02/18/2016; 7:00 pm		Western Illinois	W 86–50	21–5 (12–1)	DakotaDome (1,749); Vermillion, SD
02/20/2016; 2:00 pm, MidcoSN/ESPN3		South Dakota State	W 80–75	22–5 (13–1)	DakotaDome (3,612); Vermillion, SD
02/25/2016; 6:00 pm		at IPFW	W 90–63	23–5 (14–1)	Hilliard Gates Sports Center (546); Fort Wayne, IN
02/27/2016; 6:00 pm		at IUPUI	W 74–63	24–5 (15–1)	The Jungle (525); Indianapolis, IN
The Summit League Women's Tournament
03/05/2016; 12:00 pm, MidcoSN/ESPN3		vs. Denver; Quarterfinals	W 73–54	25–5	Denny Sanford Premier Center; Sioux Falls, SD
03/07/2016; 12:00 pm, MidcoSN/ESPN3		vs. Oral Roberts; Semifinals	W 78–61	26–5	Denny Sanford Premier Center; Sioux Falls, SD
03/08/2016; 1:00 pm, ESPNU		vs. South Dakota State; Championship Game	L 55–61	26–6	Denny Sanford Premier Center (8,647); Sioux Falls, SD
WNIT
03/16/2016*; 7:00 pm		Creighton; First Round	W 74–68	27–6	DakotaDome (1,960); Vermillion, SD
03/20/2016*; 2:00 pm		at Minnesota; Second Round	W 101–89	28–6	Williams Arena (3,224); Minneapolis, MN
03/24/2016*; 7:00 pm		Northern Iowa; Third Round	W 51–50	29–6	DakotaDome (2,433); Vermillion, SD
03/27/2016*; 6:00 pm		WKU; Quarterfinals	W 68–54	30–6	DakotaDome (2,749); Vermillion, SD
03/30/2016*; 7:00 pm		Oregon; Semifinals	W 88–54	31–6	DakotaDome (5,080); Vermillion, SD
04/02/2016*; 2:00 pm, CBSSN		Florida Gulf Coast; Championship Game	W 71–65	32–6	DakotaDome (7,415); Vermillion, SD
*Non-conference game. ^{#}Rankings from AP Poll. (#) Tournament seedings in parentheses. All times are in Central Time.

== Rankings ==
Ranking movement Legend: ██ Increase in ranking. ██ Decrease in ranking. NR = Not ranked. RV = Received votes.
Poll	Pre	Wk 2	Wk 3	Wk 4	Wk 5	Wk 6	Wk 7	Wk 8	Wk 9	Wk 10	Wk 11	Wk 12	Wk 13	Wk 14	Wk 15	Wk 16	Wk 17	Wk 18	Wk 19	Final
AP	NR	NR	NR	NR	NR	NR	NR	NR	NR	NR	NR	NR	NR	NR	NR	NR	NR	NR	NR	N/A
Coaches	NR	NR	NR	NR	NR	NR	NR	NR	NR	NR	NR	NR	NR	NR	NR	NR	NR	NR	NR	RV

== See also ==
2015–16 South Dakota Coyotes men's basketball team
