= 2016 Summit League women's basketball tournament =

- Classification: Division I
- Season: 2015–16
- Teams: 8
- Site: Denny Sanford Premier Center; Sioux Falls, South Dakota
- Champions: South Dakota State (7th title)
- Winning coach: Aaron Johnston (7th title)
- MVP: Macy Miller (South Dakota State)
- Attendance: 22,265
- Television: Midco Sport Network; ESPNU

2015–16 Summit League women's basketball standings
	Conf.				Overall
Team	W		L	PCT	W		L	PCT
South Dakota	15	–	1	.938	32	–	6	.842
South Dakota State †	13	–	3	.813	27	–	7	.794
IUPUI	11	–	5	.688	21	–	11	.656
Oral Roberts	10	–	6	.625	14	–	16	.467
Western Illinois	8	–	8	.500	16	–	16	.500
Omaha	7	–	9	.438	15	–	15	.500
IPFW	3	–	13	.188	7	–	23	.233
Denver	3	–	13	.188	5	–	25	.167
North Dakota State	2	–	14	.125	7	–	22	.241
† 2016 Summit League Tournament winner As of April 2, 2016; Rankings from AP Poll

The 2016 Summit League women's basketball tournament was a post-season women's basketball tournament for The Summit League. The tournament took place March 5–8 at the Denny Sanford Premier Center in Sioux Falls, South Dakota. The Top 8 teams in the final standings will qualify for the tournament. South Dakota State defeated South Dakota to win their second straight Summit League tournament title to receive an automatic bid into the 2016 NCAA tournament.

== Seeds ==
Seed	School	Conference	Overall	Tiebreaker #1	Tiebreaker #2
1	South Dakota	15–1	23–6		
2	South Dakota State	13–3	23–6		
3	IUPUI	11–5	20–9		
4	Oral Roberts	10–6	13–5		
5	Western Illinois	8–8	15–14		
6	Omaha	7–9	14–14		
7	IPFW	3–13	6–23	1–1 vs. Denver	1-1 vs. Oral Roberts
8	Denver	3–13	5–24	1–1 vs. IPFW	0-2 vs. Oral Roberts

== Schedule ==
Session	Game	Time*	Matchup^{#}	Television	Attendance
Quarterfinals – Saturday March 5, 2016
1	1	12:00 PM	#8 Denver vs #1 South Dakota	Midco Sport Network	3,209
1	2	2:30 PM	#7 IPFW vs #2 South Dakota State	Midco Sport Network	3,209
Quarterfinals – Sunday March 6, 2016
2	3	12:00 PM	#5 Western Illinois vs #4 Oral Roberts	Midco Sport Network	3,172
2	4	2:30 PM	#6 Omaha vs #3 IUPUI	Midco Sport Network	3,172
Semifinals – Monday March 7, 2016
3	5	12:00 PM	#1 South Dakota vs #4 Oral Roberts	Midco Sport Network	7,237
3	6	2:30 PM	#2 South Dakota State vs #6 Omaha	Midco Sport Network	7,237
Championship – Tuesday March 8, 2016
7	9	1:00 PM	#1 South Dakota vs. #2 South Dakota State	ESPNU	8,647
*Game times in CT. #-Rankings denote tournament seed

== Bracket ==
Quarterfinals; Saturday/Sunday March 5–6; Midco Sport Network
1	South Dakota	73
8	Denver	54
4	Oral Roberts	68
5	Western Illinois	55
2	South Dakota State	80
7	IPFW	60
3	IUPUI	51
6	Omaha	62

Semifinals; Monday March 7 Midco Sport Network
1	South Dakota	78
4	Oral Roberts	61
2	South Dakota State	76
6	Omaha	58

Championship game Tuesday March 8 ESPNU
1	South Dakota	55
2	South Dakota State	61

== See also ==
- 2016 Summit League men's basketball tournament
