= 2015–16 Oral Roberts Golden Eagles women's basketball team =

Intercollegiate basketball season

2015–16 Oral Roberts Golden Eagles women's basketball
- Conference: The Summit League
- Record: 14–16 (10–6 The Summit)
- Head coach: Misti Cussen (4th season)
- Assistant coaches: Kyron Stokes; Chris Wallace; Janae Voelker
- Home arena: Mabee Center

2015–16 Summit League women's basketball standings
	Conf.				Overall
Team	W		L	PCT	W		L	PCT
South Dakota	15	–	1	.938	32	–	6	.842
South Dakota State †	13	–	3	.813	27	–	7	.794
IUPUI	11	–	5	.688	21	–	11	.656
Oral Roberts	10	–	6	.625	14	–	16	.467
Western Illinois	8	–	8	.500	16	–	16	.500
Omaha	7	–	9	.438	15	–	15	.500
IPFW	3	–	13	.188	7	–	23	.233
Denver	3	–	13	.188	5	–	25	.167
North Dakota State	2	–	14	.125	7	–	22	.241
† 2016 Summit League Tournament winner As of April 2, 2016; Rankings from AP Poll

The 2015–16 Oral Roberts Golden Eagles women's basketball team represented Oral Roberts University during the 2015–16 NCAA Division I women's basketball season. The Golden Eagles were led by fourth year head coach Misti Cussen and play their home games at the Mabee Center. They were members of The Summit League. They finished the season 14–16, 10–6 in Summit League play to finish in fourth place. They advanced to the semifinals of the Summit League women's tournament, where they lost to South Dakota.

== Roster ==
2015–16 Oral Roberts Golden Eagles women's basketball team
Players
Coaches

Pos.	#	Name	Height	Year	Previous school	Hometown
G	1	Kaylan Mayberry	5 ft 6 in (1.68 m)	So	Brooker T. Washington	Tulsa, OK
G	2	Jordan Doyle	5 ft 6 in (1.68 m)	So	Broken Arrow	Broken Arrow, OK
F	4	Esther Udoumoh	5 ft 11 in (1.8 m)	So	Union	Broken Arrow, OK
G	5	Bria Pitts	5 ft 8 in (1.73 m)	RS So	East Central; Arkansas	Tulsa, OK
G	11	Lakota Beatty (I) (redshirt)	5 ft 8 in (1.73 m)	Jr	Anadarko; Oklahoma	Anadarko, OK
F	12	Dorottya Balla	6 ft 1 in (1.85 m)	Jr	PTE Babits Mihaly	Pécs, Hungary
F	15	Faith Ihim	5 ft 9 in (1.75 m)	So	Memorial	Tulsa, OK
G	22	Jordan Gilbert	5 ft 10 in (1.78 m)	So	Carl Albert	Oklahoma City, OK
G	23	Ashley Beatty	5 ft 9 in (1.75 m)	Fr	Anadarko	Anadarko, OK
F	30	Blair Bryce	6 ft 5 in (1.96 m)	RS Sr	Bishop Lynch; Belmont	Red Oak, TX
F	44	Maria Martianez	6 ft 3 in (1.91 m)	Fr	Instituto Joaquim Blume	Barcelona, Spain

Head coach

- Misti Cussen (Southern Nazarene)

Assistant coach(es)

- Kyron Stokes (Oral Roberts)
- Chris Wallace (Tulsa)
- Janae Voelker (Oral Roberts)

Legend

- (C) Team captain
- (S) Suspended
- (I) Ineligible
- (W) Walk-on
- Injured
- Current redshirt

Roster

== Schedule ==
Date time, TV	Rank^{#}	Opponent^{#}	Result	Record	Site (attendance) city, state
Exhibition
11/07/2015*; 2:00 pm		Rockhurst	W 69–65 ^{OT}		Mabee Center (779); Tulsa, OK
Non-conference regular season
11/14/2015*; 2:00 pm		Evangel	W 89–46	1–0	Mabee Center (743); Tulsa, OK
11/16/2015*; 8:00 pm		at Grand Canyon	L 64–66 ^{OT}	1–1	GCU Arena (510); Phoenix, AZ
11/20/2015*; 7:00 pm		at Tulsa; PSO Mayor's Cup	W 59–53	2–1	Reynolds Center (1,171); Tulsa, OK
11/24/2015*; 7:00 pm		Little Rock	L 52–66	2–2	Mabee Center (733); Tulsa, OK
11/27/2015*; 7:00 pm		at Oklahoma State	L 55–59	2–3	Gallagher-Iba Arena (2,184); Stillwater, OK
11/29/2015*; 1:00 pm		at Michigan	L 44–61	2–4	Crisler Center (1,809); Ann Arbor, MI
12/01/2015*; 6:00 pm, ESPN3		at Eastern Michigan	L 69–77	2–5	Convocation Center (440); Ypsilanti, MI
12/10/2015*; 8:00 pm, SECN		at Arkansas	L 50–65	2–6	Bud Walton Arena (1,348); Fayetteville, AR
12/12/2015*; 7:05 pm, ESPN3		at Missouri State	L 64–72	2–7	JQH Arena (3,112); Springfield, MO
12/15/2015*; 12:00 pm		Lyon College	L 49–68	2–8	Mabee Center (4,002); Tulsa, OK
12/17/2015*; 7:00 pm, FCS		at No. 4 Baylor	L 39–97	2–9	Ferrell Center (6,189); Waco, TX
12/22/2015*; 7:00 pm, ESPN3		at Kansas	W 70–63	3–9	Allen Fieldhouse (2,176); Lawrence, TX
The Summit League regular season
01/01/2016; 7:00 pm		at Western Illinois	L 61–72	3–10 (0–1)	Western Hall (507); Macomb, IL
01/03/2016; 1:00 pm		at IUPUI	W 52–47	4–10 (1–1)	The Jungle (335); Indianapolis, IN
01/06/2016; 7:00 pm		South Dakota	W 60–56	5–10 (2–1)	Mabee Center (736); Tulsa, OK
01/09/2016; 7:00 pm		North Dakota State	W 52–42	6–10 (3–1)	Bentson Bunker Fieldhouse (220); Fargo, ND
01/16/2016; 2:00 pm		IPFW	W 61–59	7–10 (4–1)	Mabee Center (770); Tulsa, OK
01/21/2016; 7:00 pm		at Nebraska–Omaha	W 67–65	8–10 (5–1)	Baxter Arena (743); Omaha, NE
01/23/2016; 12:00 pm		Denver	W 65–33	9–10 (6–1)	Mabee Center (759); Tulsa, OK
01/27/2016; 7:00 pm		South Dakota State	L 50–68	9–11 (6–2)	Mabee Center (615); Tulsa, OK
01/30/2016; 2:00 pm		IUPUI	L 54–57	9–12 (6–3)	Mabee Center (713); Tulsa, OK
02/04/2016; 7:00 pm		North Dakota State	W 59–58	10–12 (7–3)	Mabee Center (676); Tulsa, OK
02/07/2016; 2:00 pm		at Denver	W 59–56 ^{OT}	11–12 (8–3)	Magness Arena (371); Denver, CO
02/11/2016; 7:00 pm		at South Dakota State	L 48–60	11–13 (8–4)	Frost Arena (1,698); Brookings, SD
02/13/2016; 2:00 pm		at South Dakota	L 48–71	11–14 (8–5)	DakotaDome (1,371); Vermillion, SD
02/17/2016; 6:00 pm		at IPFW	L 48–54	11–15 (8–6)	Hilliard Gates Sports Center (481); Fort Wayne, IN
02/20/2016; 2:00 pm		Western Illinois	W 79–55	12–15 (9–6)	Mabee Center (796); Tulsa, OK
02/25/2016; 7:00 pm		Nebraska–Omaha	W 67–58	13–15 (10–6)	Mabee Center (767); Tulsa, OK
The Summit League Women's Tournament
03/06/2016; 12:00 pm, MidcoSN/ESPN3		vs. Western Illinois; Quarterfinals	W 68–55	14–15	Denny Sanford Premier Center (3,172); Sioux Falls, SD
03/07/2016; 12:00 pm, MidcoSN/ESPN3		vs. South Dakota; Semifinals	L 61–78	14–16	Denny Sanford Premier Center; Sioux Falls, SD
*Non-conference game. ^{#}Rankings from AP Poll. (#) Tournament seedings in parentheses. All times are in Central Time.

== See also ==
2015–16 Oral Roberts Golden Eagles men's basketball team
