= 2015–16 Denver Pioneers women's basketball team =

Intercollegiate basketball season

2015–16 Denver Pioneers women's basketball
- Conference: The Summit League
- Record: 5–25 (3–13 The Summit)
- Head coach: Kerry Cremeans (4th season)
- Assistant coaches: Seth Kushkin; Nettie Respondek; David Elliott
- Home arena: Magness Arena

2015–16 Summit League women's basketball standings
	Conf.				Overall
Team	W		L	PCT	W		L	PCT
South Dakota	15	–	1	.938	32	–	6	.842
South Dakota State †	13	–	3	.813	27	–	7	.794
IUPUI	11	–	5	.688	21	–	11	.656
Oral Roberts	10	–	6	.625	14	–	16	.467
Western Illinois	8	–	8	.500	16	–	16	.500
Omaha	7	–	9	.438	15	–	15	.500
IPFW	3	–	13	.188	7	–	23	.233
Denver	3	–	13	.188	5	–	25	.167
North Dakota State	2	–	14	.125	7	–	22	.241
† 2016 Summit League Tournament winner As of April 2, 2016; Rankings from AP Poll

The 2015–16 Denver Pioneers women's basketball team represented the University of Denver in the 2015–16 NCAA Division I women's basketball season. The Pioneers, led fourth year head by Kerry Cremeans, played their home games at the Magness Arena and are members of The Summit League. They finished the season 5–25, 2–13 in Summit League play to finish in a tie for seventh place. They lost in the quarterfinals of the Summit League women's tournament to South Dakota.

== Roster ==
2015–16 Denver Pioneers women's basketball team
Players
Coaches

Pos.	#	Name	Height	Year	Previous school	Hometown
G	2	Samantha Romanowski	5 ft 9 in (1.75 m)	Fr	Mountlake Terrace HS	Mountlake Terrace, WA
G	10	Haley Simental	5 ft 8 in (1.73 m)	Fr	Pueblo West HS; Colorado Connections Academy	Pueblo West, CO
G	12	Jacqlyn Poss	5 ft 9 in (1.75 m)	Jr	Roseville Area HS	Shoreview, MN
F	15	Alecia Espinoza	6 ft 1 in (1.85 m)	Jr	Troy Tech HS	Hacienda Heights, CA
G	20	Ciera Morgan	5 ft 9 in (1.75 m)	So	Highlands Ranch HS	Parker, CO
F	21	Maya Rogers	5 ft 11 in (1.8 m)	Fr	Rocky Mountain HS	Meridian, ID
G	22	Paige Bradley	5 ft 9 in (1.75 m)	Sr	The Woodlands HS	The Woodlands, TX
F	31	Jesse Spittel	6 ft 2 in (1.88 m)	Jr	Orange Lutheran HS	Yorba Linda, CA
F	32	Tori Bryant	6 ft 2 in (1.88 m)	RS So	Brea Olinda HS	Brea, CA
F	34	Jahala Osbourne (I) (redshirt)	6 ft 0 in (1.83 m)	So	Colonial Forge HS; Army	Stafford, VA
F	40	Avery Queen	6 ft 2 in (1.88 m)	So	Boerne HS	Boerne, TX
F	45	Jordyn Alt	6 ft 2 in (1.88 m)	So	Cretin-Derham Hall HS	North Oaks, MN

Head coach

- Kerry Cremeans (Florida)

Assistant coach(es)

- Seth Kushkin (Wisconsin)
- Nettie Respondek (Vanderbilt)
- David Elliott (Arizona)

Legend

- (C) Team captain
- (S) Suspended
- (I) Ineligible
- (W) Walk-on
- Injured
- Current redshirt

Roster

== Schedule ==
Date time, TV	Rank^{#}	Opponent^{#}	Result	Record	Site (attendance) city, state
Non-conference regular season
11/13/2015*; 7:00 pm		Northern Colorado	L 51–60	0–1	Magness Arena (633); Denver, CO
11/15/2015*; 1:00 pm		Weber State	L 49–61	0–2	Magness Arena (519); Denver, CO
11/18/2015*; 7:00 pm		at Air Force	W 57–48	1–2	Clune Arena (208); Colorado Springs, CO
11/27/2015*; 2:15 pm		vs. No. 3 Notre Dame; Junkanoo Jam Freeport Division semifinals	L 52–94	1–3	St. Georges High School (375); Grand Bahama Island
11/28/2015*; 11:00 am		vs. Louisiana Tech; Junkanoo Jam Freeport Division 3rd place game	L 53–58	1–4	St. Georges High School (348); Grand Bahama Island
12/03/2015*; 8:00 pm		at Seattle	L 51–57	1–5	Showare Center (157); Kent, WA
12/05/2015*; 2:00 pm		at Pepperdine	L 60–64	1–6	Firestone Fieldhouse (312); Malibu, CA
12/09/2015*; 12:00 pm, RTRM		Wyoming	L 64–75	1–7	Magness Arena (1,795); Denver, CO
12/12/2015*; 12:00 pm		at UMKC	L 58–68	1–8	Municipal Auditorium (207); Kansas City, MO
12/14/2015*; 6:00 pm		at Milwaukee	W 56–49	2–8	Klotsche Center (514); Milwaukee, WI
12/17/2015*; 7:00 pm		UIC	L 46–56	2–9	Magness Arena (312); Denver, CO
12/20/2015*; 7:00 pm		Colorado State	L 46–74	2–10	Magness Arena (495); Denver, CO
12/28/2015*; 7:00 pm		Long Beach State	L 41–48	2–11	Magness Arena (333); Denver, CO
The Summit League regular season
12/30/2015; 7:00 pm		South Dakota State	L 39–76	2–12 (0–1)	Magness Arena (540); Denver, CO
01/01/2016; 11:00 am		at South Dakota	L 60–85	2–13 (0–2)	DakotaDome (1,620); Vermillion, SD
01/07/2016; 7:00 pm		North Dakota State	W 64–53	3–13 (1–2)	Magness Arena (247); Denver, CO
01/09/2016; 1:00 pm		IPFW	W 53–50 ^{OT}	4–13 (2–2)	Magness Arena (287); Denver, CO
01/15/2016; 6:00 pm		at Western Illinois	L 60–63	4–14 (2–3)	Western Hall (703); Macomb, IL
01/17/2016; 1:00 pm		at Nebraska–Omaha	L 55–67	4–15 (2–4)	Baxter Arena (552); Omaha, NE
01/23/2016; 6:00 pm		at Oral Roberts	L 33–65	4–16 (2–5)	Mabee Center (759); Tulsa, OK
01/28/2016; 5:00 pm		at IUPUI	L 75–81 ^{2OT}	4–17 (2–6)	The Jungle (557); Indianapolis, IN
01/30/2016; 12:00 pm		at IPFW	L 49–61	4–18 (2–7)	Hilliard Gates Sports Center (797); Fort Wayne, IN
02/05/2016; 7:00 pm		South Dakota	L 33–79	4–19 (2–8)	Magness Arena (420); Denver, CO
02/07/2016; 1:00 pm		Oral Roberts	L 56–59 ^{OT}	4–20 (2–9)	Magness Arena (371); Denver, CO
02/10/2016; 7:00 pm		Western Illinois	L 69–80	4–21 (2–10)	Magness Arena (320); Denver, CO
02/14/2016; 1:00 pm		IUPUI	L 54–67	4–22 (2–11)	Magness Arena (325); Denver, CO
02/18/2015; 6:00 pm		at South Dakota State	L 52–80	4–23 (2–12)	Frost Arena (1,823); Brookings, SD
02/20/2016; 12:00 pm		at North Dakota State	W 55–45	5–23 (3–12)	Scheels Arena (1,075); Fargo, ND
02/27/2016; 1:00 pm		Nebraska–Omaha	L 60–70	5–24 (3–13)	Magness Arena (445); Denver, CO
The Summit League Women's Tournament
03/05/2016; 11:00 am, MidcoSN		vs. South Dakota; Quarterfinals	L 54–73	5–25	Denny Sanford Premier Center; Sioux Falls, SD
*Non-conference game. ^{#}Rankings from AP Poll. (#) Tournament seedings in parentheses. All times are in Central Time.

== See also ==
- 2015–16 Denver Pioneers men's basketball team
