= 2015–16 Western Illinois Leathernecks women's basketball team =

Intercollegiate basketball season

2015–16 Western Illinois Leathernecks women's basketball

WBI, Quarterfinals
- Conference: Summit League
- Record: 16–16 (8–8 The Summit)
- Head coach: JD Gravina (5th season)
- Assistant coaches: Seth Minter; Bailey Harmon; Sydney Crafton
- Home arena: Western Hall

2015–16 Summit League women's basketball standings
	Conf.				Overall
Team	W		L	PCT	W		L	PCT
South Dakota	15	–	1	.938	32	–	6	.842
South Dakota State †	13	–	3	.813	27	–	7	.794
IUPUI	11	–	5	.688	21	–	11	.656
Oral Roberts	10	–	6	.625	14	–	16	.467
Western Illinois	8	–	8	.500	16	–	16	.500
Omaha	7	–	9	.438	15	–	15	.500
IPFW	3	–	13	.188	7	–	23	.233
Denver	3	–	13	.188	5	–	25	.167
North Dakota State	2	–	14	.125	7	–	22	.241
† 2016 Summit League Tournament winner As of April 2, 2016; Rankings from AP Poll

The 2015–16 Western Illinois Leathernecks women's basketball team represented Western Illinois University in the 2015–16 NCAA Division I women's basketball season. The Leathernecks, led by fifth-year head by JD Gravina, played their home games at the Western Hall and were members of The Summit League. They finished the season 16–16, 8–8 in Summit League play to finish in fifth place. They lost in the quarterfinals of The Summit League women's tournament to Oral Roberts. They were invited to the WBI, where they defeated Southern Illinois in the first round before losing to USC Upstate in the quarterfinals.

== Roster ==
2015–16 Western Illinois Leathernecks women's basketball team
Players
Coaches

Pos.	#	Name	Height	Year	Previous school	Hometown
G	4	Ciara Marlow	5 ft 7 in (1.7 m)	RS Jr	Monmouth-Roseville; Aurora	Roseville, IL
G	10	Mallory Boyle	5 ft 11 in (1.8 m)	Jr	North Mahaska	New Sharon, IA
G	12	Morgan Blumer (I) (redshirt)	5 ft 11 in (1.8 m)	So	Milton; Florida Gulf Coast	Milton, WI
G	14	Michelle Maher	5 ft 9 in (1.75 m)	Sr	Maine South	Park Ridge, IL
G	15	Emily Clemens	5 ft 4 in (1.63 m)	So	Muscatine	Muscatine, IA
F	21	Jasmine Patrick	6 ft 0 in (1.83 m)	Jr	Westside; Grossmont College	Jacksonville, FL
G	22	Michelle Farrow	5 ft 10 in (1.78 m)	RS So	Waukesha West	Waukesha, WI
G	23	Taylor McClintock	5 ft 10 in (1.78 m)	RS So	Illini Bluffs; Mercer	Glasford, IL
G	24	Taylor Higginbotham	5 ft 10 in (1.78 m)	Fr	Germantown	Germantown, WI
G	25	Liz Skotowski	5 ft 9 in (1.75 m)	Sr	Mount Vernon	Mount Vernon, IA
F	32	Paige Harmon	6 ft 0 in (1.83 m)	Sr	Oswego	Oswego, IL
F	34	Olivia Braun (I) (redshirt)	6 ft 1 in (1.85 m)	Jr	St. Catherine's; Toledo	Racine, WI
F	44	Sophie Reichelt	6 ft 2 in (1.88 m)	Sr	Holy Names Academy	Mill Creek, WA

Head coach

- JD Gravina (William Jewell)

Assistant coach(es)

- Seth Minter (Culver–Stockton)
- Bailey Harmon (Illinois)
- Sydney Crafton (Missouri)

Legend

- (C) Team captain
- (S) Suspended
- (I) Ineligible
- (W) Walk-on
- Injured
- Current redshirt

Roster

== Schedule ==
Date time, TV	Rank^{#}	Opponent^{#}	Result	Record	Site (attendance) city, state
Exhibition
10/30/2015*; 7:00 pm		William Woods	W 80–41		Western Hall; Macomb, IL
11/05/2015*; 7:00 pm		Truman State	W 63–41		Western Hall; Macomb, IL
Non-conference regular season
11/13/2015*; 7:00 pm		Central Methodist	W 108–46	1–0	Western Hall (925); Macomb, IL
11/15/2015*; 7:00 pm, ESPN3		SIU Edwardsville	W 78–74	2–0	Western Hall (614); Macomb, IL
11/19/2015*; 7:00 pm		at Iowa	L 81–96 ^{OT}	2–1	Carver–Hawkeye Arena (3,543); Iowa City, IA
11/21/2015*; 7:00 pm		Chicago State	W 88–50	3–1	Western Hall (543); Macomb, IL
11/24/2015*; 11:00 am		Southeast Missouri State	L 84–89	3–2	Western Hall (1,246); Macomb, IL
11/27/2015*; 12:00 pm		vs. Towson; UNF Thanksgiving Classic	L 77–83	3–3	UNF Arena; Jacksonville, FL
11/28/2015*; 1:00 pm		vs. Bethune-Cookman; UNF Thanksgiving Classic	W 75–59	4–3	UNF Arena (354); Jacksonville, FL
12/02/2015*; 6:00 pm		at Eastern Illinois	W 92–69	5–3	Lantz Arena (319); Charleston, IL
12/05/2015*; 4:30 pm		Ashford	W 86–58	6–3	Western Hall (471); Macomb, IL
12/08/2015*; 7:00 pm		at North Dakota	L 67–78	6–4	Betty Engelstad Sioux Center (1,385); Grand Forks, ND
12/12/2015*; 4:30 pm		UIC	L 70–78	6–5	Western Hall (551); Macomb, IL
12/21/2015*; 7:00 pm, ESPN3		at Kansas State	L 45–84	6–6	Bramlage Coliseum (551); Manhattan, KS
12/28/2015*; 7:00 pm, ESPN3		at Illinois State	W 79–64	7–6	Redbird Arena (539); Normal, IL
The Summit League regular season
01/01/2016; 7:00 pm		Oral Roberts	W 72–61	8–6 (1–0)	Western Hall (539); Macomb, IL
01/03/2016; 1:00 pm		at Nebraska–Omaha	L 66–79	8–7 (1–1)	Baxter Arena (528); Omaha, NE
01/07/2016; 6:00 pm		at IPFW	W 78–74	9–7 (2–1)	Hilliard Gates Sports Center (498); Fort Wayne, IN
01/09/2016; 5:30 pm		at IUPUI	L 60–68	9–8 (2–2)	Western Hall (405); Macomb, IL
01/15/2016; 7:00 pm		Denver	W 63–60	10–8 (3–2)	Western Hall (703); Macomb, IL
01/21/2016; 7:00 pm		at North Dakota State	W 94–82	11–8 (4–2)	Bentson Bunker Fieldhouse (523); Fargo, ND
01/23/2016; 2:00 pm		at South Dakota State	L 63–85	11–9 (4–3)	Frost Arena (1,963); Vermillion, SD
01/27/2016; 7:00 pm		South Dakota	L 77–102	11–10 (4–4)	Western Hall (644); Macomb, IL
01/30/2016; 4:30 pm		Nebraska–Omaha	W 74–55	12–10 (5–4)	Western Hall (801); Macomb, IL
02/04/2016; 7:00 pm		IPFW	W 88–87	13–10 (6–4)	Western Hall (511); Macomb, IL
02/06/2016; 2:00 pm		at IUPUI	L 87–96	13–11 (6–5)	The Jungle (352); Indianapolis, IN
02/10/2016; 8:00 pm		at Denver	W 80–69	14–11 (7–5)	Magness Arena (320); Denver, CO
02/18/2016; 7:00 pm		at South Dakota	L 50–86	14–12 (7–6)	DakotaDome (1,749); Vermillion, SD
02/20/2016; 2:00 pm		at Oral Roberts	L 55–79	14–13 (7–7)	Mabee Center (796); Tulsa, OK
02/25/2016; 5:30 pm		North Dakota State	W 100–89	15–13 (8–7)	Western Hall (904); Macomb, IL
02/27/2016; 4:30 pm		South Dakota State	L 65–66	15–14 (8–8)	Western Hall (1,072); Macomb, IL
The Summit League Women's Tournament
03/06/2016; 12:00 pm, MidcoSN/ESPN3		vs. Oral Roberts; Quarterfinals	L 55–68	15–15	Denny Sanford Premier Center (3,172); Sioux Falls, SD
WBI
03/17/2016*; 7:00 pm		Southern Illinois; First Round	W 99–97 ^{OT}	16–15	Western Hall (694); Macomb, IL
03/19/2016*; 6:00 pm		at USC Upstate; Quarterfinals	L 78–81	16–16	G. B. Hodge Center (172); Spartanburg, SC
*Non-conference game. ^{#}Rankings from AP Poll. (#) Tournament seedings in parentheses. All times are in Central Time.

== See also ==
2015–16 Western Illinois Leathernecks men's basketball team
