= Lynette Woodard =

American basketball player and coach (born 1959)

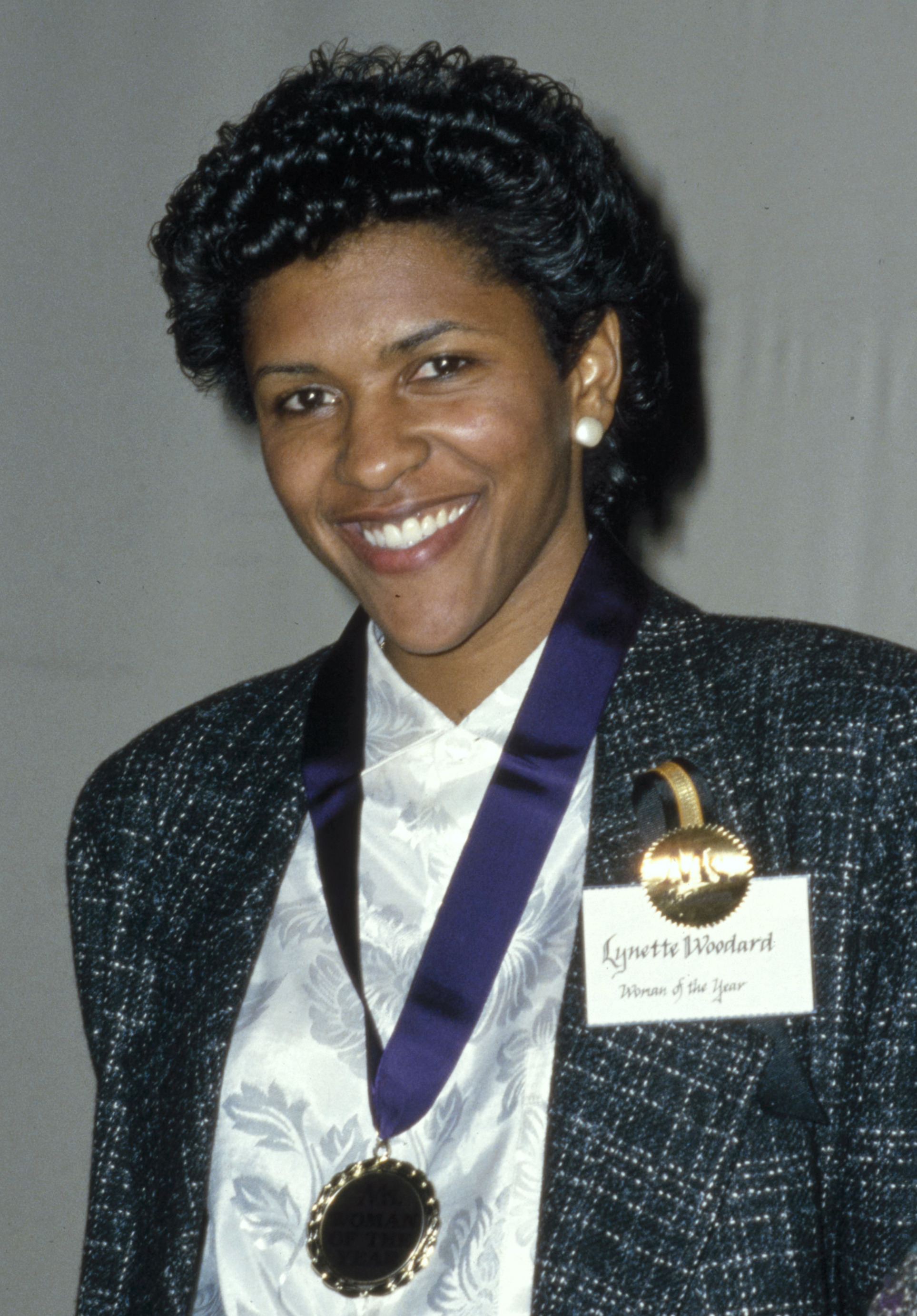
- Woodard at the Ms. Magazine Woman of the Year Awards, 1986

Personal information
- Born: August 12, 1959 (age 67) Wichita, Kansas, U.S.
- Listed height: 6 ft 0 in (1.83 m)
- Listed weight: 160 lb (73 kg)

Career information
- High school: Wichita North (Wichita, Kansas)
- College: Kansas (1977–1981)
- WNBA draft: 1997: Allocated
- Drafted by: Cleveland Rockers
- Playing career: 1981–1999
- Position: Guard
- Number: 8

Career history

Playing
- 1997: Cleveland Rockers
- 1998: Detroit Shock

Coaching
- 2016–2017: Winthrop (assistant)
- 2017–2020: Winthrop

Career highlights
- USA Basketball Female Athlete of the Year (1983); Honda Sports Award (1981); Wade Trophy (1981); 4× Kodak All-American (1978–1981)
- Stats at Basketball Reference
- Basketball Hall of Fame
- Women's Basketball Hall of Fame
Medals
Women's basketball
Representing the United States
Olympic Games
Gold medal – first place	1984 Los Angeles	Team competition
World Cup
Gold medal – first place	1990 Malaysia	Team competition
Silver medal – second place	1983 Rio de Janeiro	Team competition
Pan American Games
Bronze medal – third place	1991 Havana	Team
Gold medal – first place	1983 Caracas	Team competition
Universiade
Gold medal – first place	1979 Mexico City	Team competition
Jones Cup
Gold medal – first place	1984	Team competition

Lynette Woodard (born August 12, 1959) is an American basketball player and former head women's basketball coach at Winthrop University. She is a member of the Basketball Hall of Fame.

Woodward played college basketball for the Kansas Jayhawks. She was a member of the United States women's 1984 basketball team that won the gold medal. She became the first female member of the Harlem Globetrotters in 1985. At age 38, she began playing as one of the oldest members in the newly formed American professional Women's National Basketball Association (WNBA) in 1997.

== Biography ==
Woodward led Wichita North High School to state basketball championships in 1975 and 1977. She scored 1,678 points and collected 1,030 rebounds in just 62 high school games in three seasons.

Woodard went on to play college basketball with the University of Kansas (KU) in 1978, playing there until 1981 in the Association for Intercollegiate Athletics for Women (AIAW) era of college basketball. She was a four-time All-American at KU, and averaged 26 points per game and scored 3,649 points in total during her four years there, and was the first KU woman to be honored by having her jersey retired. Before being passed by Caitlin Clark in February 2024, Woodard was the unofficial major college basketball's career women's scoring leader, due to the National Collegiate Athletic Association not recognizing statistics from the AIAW.

In 1981, she was signed by an Italian team, UFO Schio (Vicenza), to participate in their league.

In 1984, she was a member of the United States women's basketball team that won the gold medal at the Los Angeles Olympic Games.

In 1985, Woodard became the first woman ever to play with the Globetrotters. (Woodard's cousin, Hubert "Geese" Ausbie, played for the Globetrotters from 1961 to 1985.)

In 1989, she was inducted into the National High School Hall of Fame. In 1990, she was inducted into the Kansas Sports Hall of Fame, and was signed by a Japanese women's team to play in their country. She played there until 1993. She served as athletics director for the Kansas City, Missouri, school district from 1992 to 1994.

In 1997, she was signed by the Cleveland Rockers of the newly founded WNBA. The following year, she was selected in the 1998 expansion draft by the Detroit Shock. Woodard's final WNBA game was played on August 19, 1998, in an 82–68 win over the New York Liberty where she recorded 18 points, 9 rebounds, 3 assists and 2 steals. She was waived by the Shock on May 7, 1999. During the WNBA's off-season, she began working as a stockbroker in New York City.

She retired from playing in 1999 and returned to KU serving as assistant coach of the women's basketball team. In late January 2004, she was named interim head coach, filling for the regular coach Marian Washington, who had retired for medical reasons. In September 2004, after she was passed over for head coach, she became a financial consultant for A.G. Edwards & Sons Inc., in Wichita.

In September 2004, she was inducted into the Naismith Memorial Basketball Hall of Fame in Springfield, Massachusetts. In June 2005, she was inducted into the Women's Basketball Hall of Fame in Knoxville, Tennessee.

Woodard also received the 2015 Women's Blue Chip Basketball League Women's Professional Basketball "Trailblazer" Award on August 2, 2015. The award recognizes some of the most influential people in professional women's basketball, specifically those who helped blaze the trail, shape the overall landscape and pave the way for women's professional basketball.

In 2017, she was named the head coach of the Winthrop Eagles women's basketball team.

Woodard was inducted as an honorary member of Sigma Gamma Rho sorority on July 24, 2026, at their 61st Biennial Boule in Tampa, Florida.

== Career statistics ==
Legend
GP	Games played	GS	Games started	MPG	Minutes per game	RPG	Rebounds per game
APG	Assists per game	SPG	Steals per game	BPG	Blocks per game	PPG	Points per game
TO	Turnovers per game	FG%	Field-goal percentage	3P%	3-point field-goal percentage	FT%	Free-throw percentage
**Bold**	Career best	°	League leader

=== WNBA ===
==== Regular season ====
Year	Team	GP	GS	MPG	FG%	3P%	FT%	RPG	APG	SPG	BPG	TO	PPG
1997	Cleveland	**28**	**27**	**25.4**	**40.1**	0.0	**67.2**	**4.1**	**2.4**	**1.6**	**0.4**	2.5	**7.8**
1998	Detroit	27	8	14.2	38.7	0.0	57.5	2.4	0.8	0.8	0.1	**1.1**	3.5
Career	2 years, 2 teams	55	35	19.9	39.7	0.0	63.5	3.3	1.6	1.2	0.2	1.8	5.7

=== College ===
Legend
GP	Games played	GS	Games started	MPG	Minutes per game
FG%	Field goal percentage	3P%	3-point field goal percentage	FT%	Free throw percentage
RPG	Rebounds per game	APG	Assists per game	SPG	Steals per game
BPG	Blocks per game	PPG	Points per game	**Bold**	Career high

Year	Team	GP	Points	FG%	3P%	FT%	RPG	APG	SPG	BPG	PPG
1977-78	Kansas	33	833	49.7%	-	66.4%	**14.8**	2.1			25.2
1978-79	Kansas	**38**	**1177**	**56.2%**	-	65.6%	14.3	2.6	**5.1**	**1.5**	**31.0**
1979-80	Kansas	37	881	50.4%	-	**71.4%**	10.5	4.5	4.8	0.9	23.8
1980-81	Kansas	31	758	52.8%	-	68.8%	10.0	**5.5**	4.9	1.1	24.5
Career		139	3649	52.5%	-	68.1%	12.5	3.1	3.8	0.9	26.3

== USA Basketball ==
Woodard was named to the team representing the US at the 1979 World University Games, held in Mexico City, Mexico. The USA team won all seven games to take the gold medal. The USA team played and beat Cuba twice, the team that had defeated them at the Pan Am games. Woodard averaged 14.1 points per game.

Woodard was selected to be a member of the team representing the US at the 1980 Olympics, but the team did not go, due to the 1980 Olympic boycott. The team did go 6–1 in Olympic Qualifying games, with Woodard scoring 4.5 points per game.

Woodard was selected to be a member of the team representing the US at the 1983 Pan American Games held in Caracas, Venezuela. The team won all five games to earn the gold medal for the event. Woodard averaged 19.0 points per game and 4.0 rebounds per game, both second best on the team.

Woodard played for the USA National team in the 1983 World Championships, held in Sao Paulo, Brazil. The team won six games, but lost two against the Soviet Union. In an opening round game, the USA team had a nine-point lead at halftime, but the Soviets came back to take the lead, and a final shot by the USA failed to drop, leaving the USSR team with a one-point victory 85–84. The USA team won their next four games, setting up the gold medal game against the USSR. This game was also close, and was tied at 82 points each with six seconds to go in the game. The Soviets' Elena Chausova received the inbounds pass and hit the game winning shot in the final seconds, giving the USSR team the gold medal with a score of 84–82. The USA team earned the silver medal. Woodard averaged 15.8 points per game, second highest on the team, and recorded 33 steals to lead the team.

Woodard was a member of the USA National team at the 1990 World Championships, held in Kuala Lumpur, Malaysia. The team won their opening round games fairly easily, with the closest of the first three games a 27-point victory over Czechoslovakia. Then they faced Cuba, a team that had beaten the US in exhibition matches only a few weeks earlier. The USA team was losing at halftime, but came back to win 87–78. The USA team found itself behind at halftime to Canada in their next game, but came back to win easily 95–70. After an easy match against Bulgaria, the USA team faced Czechoslovakia again, and achieved an almost identical result, winning 87–59. In the title match, the USA team won the gold medal with a score of 88–78. Woodard averaged 6.3 points per game.

In 1984, the USA sent its National team to the 1984 William Jones Cup competition in Taipei, Taiwan, for pre-Olympic practice. The team easily beat each of the eight teams they played, winning by an average of just under 50 points per game. Woodard averaged 11.6 points per game.

Woodard played with the USA team at the 1991 Pan American Games. The team finished with a record of 4–2, but managed to win the bronze medal. The USA team lost a three-point game to Brazil, then responded with wins over Argentina and Cuba, earning a spot in the medal round. The next game was a rematch against Cuba, and this time the team from Cuba won a five-point game. The USA beat Canada to win the bronze. Woodard averaged 2.3 points per game.

== Awards and honors ==
- 1981: Winner of the Broderick Award (now the Honda Sports Award) for basketball
- 1981: Wade Trophy
- 2015: WBCBL Professional Basketball Trailblazer Award
- 2020: Brookwood Alpacas Elementary Award Kansas Stats

Preceded by Nancy Lopez	Flo Hyman Memorial Award; 1993	Succeeded by Patty Sheehan
