= 1997 Sacramento Monarchs season =

- Head coach: Mary Murphy (fired Jul. 28, 5–10 record); Heidi VanDerveer (5–8 record)
- Arena: ARCO Arena

Results
- Record: 10–18 (.357)
- Place: 3rd (Western)
- Playoff finish: Did not qualify

The 1997 WNBA season was the inaugural season for the Sacramento Monarchs.

== Transactions ==
=== WNBA allocation draft ===
Player	Nationality	School/Team/Country
Bridgette Gordon	United States	Tennessee
Ruthie Bolton	United States	Auburn

=== WNBA elite draft ===
Round	Pick	Player	Nationality	School/Team/Country
1	6	Judy Mosley-McAfee	United States	Hawaii
2	14	Mikiko Hagiwara	Japan	Japan

=== WNBA draft ===
Round	Pick	Player	Nationality	School/Team/Country
1	2	Pamela McGee	United States	USC
2	15	Denique Graves	United States	Howard
3	18	Chantel Tremitiere	United States	Auburn
4	31	Tajama Abraham	United States	George Washington

=== Transactions ===
Date	Transaction
January 22, 1997	Drafted Bridgette Gordon and Ruthie Bolton in the 1997 WNBA Allocation Draft
February 27, 1997	Drafted Judy Mosley-McAfee and Mikiko Hagiwara in the 1997 WNBA Elite Draft
April 14, 1997	Hired Mary Murphy as Head Coach
April 28, 1997	Drafted Pamela McGee, Denique Graves, Chantel Tremitiere and Tajama Abraham in the 1997 WNBA draft
July 18, 1997	Waived Corissa Yasen
July 20, 1997	Waived Judy Mosley-McAfee
July 27, 1997	Waived Yvette Angel
July 28, 1997	Fired Mary Murphy as Head Coach
July 28, 1997	Hired Heidi VanDerveer as Head Coach
July 31, 1997	Traded Mikiko Hagiwara to Phoenix Mercury in exchange for future considerations
August 6, 1997	Waived Margold Clark

== Roster ==
1997 Sacramento Monarchs roster
Players
Coaches

Pos.	No.	Nat.	Name	Height	Weight	DOB	From	Yrs
C	40	(United States)	Abraham, Tajama	6' 2" (1.88m)	190 lb (86kg)	1975-09-27	George Washington	R
G	11	(United States)	Angel, Yvette	5' 8" (1.73m)		1963-10-14	Ohio State	R
G	6	(United States)	Bolton, Ruthie	5' 9" (1.75m)	150 lb (68kg)	1967-05-27	Auburn	R
G/F	51	(United States)	Byears, Latasha	5' 11" (1.8m)	206 lb (93kg)	1973-08-12	DePaul	R
F/C	7	(United States)	Clark, Margold	6' 3" (1.91m)		1971-01-01	Arizona	R
F	30	(United States)	Gordon, Bridgette	6' 0" (1.83m)	172 lb (78kg)	1967-04-27	Tennessee	R
C	33	(United States)	Graves, Denique	6' 3" (1.91m)	212 lb (96kg)	1975-09-16	Howard	R
G	24	(Japan)	Hagiwara, Mikiko	5' 9" (1.75m)	160 lb (73kg)	1970-04-27		R
F/C	5	(United States)	McGee, Pamela	6' 3" (1.91m)	180 lb (82kg)	1962-12-01	USC	R
F	7	(United States)	Mosley-McAfee, Judy	6' 1" (1.85m)		1968-03-17	Hawaiʻi	R
G	10	(France)	Savasta, Laure	5' 8" (1.73m)	135 lb (61kg)	1974-03-18	Washington	R
G	3	(United States)	Tremitiere, Chantel	5' 6" (1.68m)	142 lb (64kg)	1969-10-20	Auburn	R
G	13	(United States)	Viglione, Danielle	5' 10" (1.78m)	157 lb (71kg)	1975-03-07	Texas	R
G	20	(United States)	Yasen, Corissa	6' 0" (1.83m)	160 lb (73kg)	1973-12-05	Purdue	R

Head coach
(United States) Heidi VanDerveer (College of Charleston)

Legend

- (C) Team captain
- (DP) Unsigned draft pick
- (FA) Free agent
- (S) Suspended
- Injured

== Schedule ==
=== Regular season ===
1997 game log
Total: 10–18 (Home: 8–8; Road: 2–10)
June: 2–2 (Home: 1–1; Road: 1–1)

Game	Date	Team	Score	High points	High rebounds	High assists	Location Attendance	Record
1	June 21	@ Utah	W 70–60	Ruthie Bolton (18)	Ruthie Bolton (11)	Chantel Tremitiere (4)	Delta Center	1–0
2	June 23	Houston	L 62–73	Ruthie Bolton (27)	Ruthie Bolton (12)	Chantel Tremitiere (4)	ARCO Arena	1–1
3	June 26	Charlotte	W 78–70	Pamela McGee (23)	Bridgette Gordon (8)	Chantel Tremitiere (5)	ARCO Arena	2–1
4	June 27	@ Los Angeles	L 92–102	Ruthie Bolton (20)	Ruthie Bolton (6)	Ruthie Bolton (6)	Great Western Forum	2–2

July: 3–9 (Home: 2–5; Road: 1–4)

Game	Date	Team	Score	High points	High rebounds	High assists	Location Attendance	Record
5	July 2	Utah	L 68–73 (OT)	Ruthie Bolton (20)	Judy Mosley-McAfee (9)	Chantel Tremitiere (10)	ARCO Arena	2–3
6	July 6	Cleveland	W 70–67	Ruthie Bolton (23)	Bridgette Gordon (8)	Bolton; Tremitiere (4)	ARCO Arena	3–3
7	July 7	@ Utah	W 79–69	Ruthie Bolton (22)	Bolton; Gordon; Mosley-McAfee; Tremitiere (7)	Chantel Tremitiere (12)	Delta Center	4–3
8	July 10	@ Cleveland	L 61–77	Ruthie Bolton (25)	Ruthie Bolton (8)	Chantel Tremitiere (6)	Gund Arena	4–4
9	July 12	@ Houston	L 61–89	Ruthie Bolton (14)	Ruthie Bolton (8)	Chantel Tremitiere (5)	The Summit	4–5
10	July 15	Los Angeles	W 78–73	Bridgette Gordon (22)	Latasha Byears (10)	Byears; Gordon; Tremitiere (4)	ARCO Arena	5–5
11	July 16	@ Phoenix	L 67–84	Bridgette Gordon (19)	Latasha Byears (8)	Angel; Gordon (3)	America West Arena	5–6
12	July 18	Houston	L 60–82	Bridgette Gordon (18)	Latasha Byears (6)	Angel; Tremitiere (5)	ARCO Arena	5–7
13	July 21	Phoenix	L 57–50	Latasha Byears (21)	Latasha Byears (17)	Chantel Tremitiere (6)	ARCO Arena	5–8
14	July 25	Houston	L 76–86	Byears; McGee (17)	Latasha Byears (17)	Chantel Tremitiere (5)	ARCO Arena	5–9
15	July 27	Los Angeles	L 62–84	Bolton; McGee (16)	Bolton; McGee (8)	Latasha Byears (6)	ARCO Arena	5–10
16	July 30	@ New York	L 68–73 (OT)	Bridgette Gordon (23)	Latasha Byears (10)	Chantel Tremitiere (7)	Madison Square Garden	5–11

August: 5–7 (Home: 5–2; Road: 0–5)

Game	Date	Team	Score	High points	High rebounds	High assists	Location Attendance	Record
17	August 1	@ Charlotte	L 61–85	Ruthie Bolton (18)	Ruthie Bolton (9)	Chantel Tremitiere (4)	Charlotte Coliseum	5–12
18	August 2	@ Cleveland	L 51–72	Ruthie Bolton (19)	Latasha Byears (11)	Chantel Tremitiere (5)	Gund Arena	5–13
19	August 4	@ Phoenix	L 60–83	Ruthie Bolton (22)	Latasha Byears (12)	Bridgette Gordon (5)	America West Arena	5–14
20	August 6	Charlotte	W 77–64	Ruthie Bolton (24)	Bridgette Gordon (9)	Ruthie Bolton (5)	ARCO Arena	6–14
21	August 8	Utah	W 93–78	Ruthie Bolton (34)	Latasha Byears (11)	Chantel Tremitiere (9)	ARCO Arena	7–14
22	August 10	New York	W 76–69	Latasha Byears (23)	Latasha Byears (8)	Chantel Tremitiere (5)	ARCO Arena	8–14
23	August 12	Cleveland	W 81–76	Ruthie Bolton (34)	Latasha Byears (11)	Byears; Tremitiere (4)	ARCO Arena	9–14
24	August 14	@ Charlotte	L 51–68	Ruthie Bolton (13)	Latasha Byears (11)	Pamela McGee (3)	Charlotte Coliseum	9–15
25	August 15	@ New York	L 63–79	Pamela McGee (17)	Latasha Byears (8)	Bridgette Gordon (5)	Madison Square Garden	9–16
26	August 20	Phoenix	L 54–69	Ruthie Bolton (12)	Corissa Yasen (5)	Ruthie Bolton (5)	ARCO Arena	9–17
27	August 22	Los Angeles	L 77–88	Latasha Byears (19)	Ruthie Bolton (8)	Chantel Tremitiere (6)	Great Western Forum	9–18
28	August 24	Houston	W 68–58	Gordon; McGee (16)	Bridgette Gordon (9)	Chantel Tremitiere (4)	ARCO Arena	10–18

1997 season schedule

=== Season standings ===
Western Conference	W	L	PCT	Conf.	GB
Phoenix Mercury ^{x}	16	12	.571	9–3	–
Los Angeles Sparks ^{o}	14	14	.500	8–4	2.0
Sacramento Monarchs ^{o}	10	18	.357	4–8	6.0
Utah Starzz ^{o}	7	21	.250	3–9	9.0

== Statistics ==
Legend
GP	Games played	GS	Games started	MPG	Minutes per game	RPG	Rebounds per game
APG	Assists per game	SPG	Steals per game	BPG	Blocks per game	PPG	Points per game
FG%	Field-goal percentage	3P%	3-point field-goal percentage	FT%	Free-throw percentage	TO	Turnovers per game
PF	Fouls per game		Team leader		League leader

=== Regular season ===
Player	GP	GS	MPG	FG%	3P%	FT%	RPG	APG	SPG	BPG	PPG
Chantel Tremitiere	28	28	37.5	.352	.189	.744	4.1	4.8	1.9	0.0	7.6
Ruthie Bolton	23	23	35.3	.402	.344	.768	5.8	2.6	2.3	0.0	19.4
Bridgette Gordon	28	28	35.0	.433	.275	.785	4.8	2.8	1.4	0.3	13.0
Pamela McGee	27	27	25.6	.459	.286	.705	4.4	0.7	1.0	0.5	10.6
Latasha Byears	28	19	23.4	.459	.200	.739	6.9	1.7	1.4	0.3	8.7
Judy Mosley-McAfee	13	9	20.4	.440	N/A	1.000	3.6	0.8	0.6	0.2	4.2
Yvette Angel	5	3	18.0	.438	.000	.000	1.8	2.2	0.8	0.2	2.8
Tajama Anderson	28	5	15.1	.381	N/A	.684	2.4	0.5	0.4	0.4	4.4
Mikiko Hagiwara	14	2	12.4	.319	.273	.667	0.6	0.7	0.1	0.1	3.1
Margold Clark	4	0	11.5	.500	.000	.500	1.5	0.3	0.3	0.3	1.8
Laure Savasta	14	0	11.2	.244	.200	.778	0.4	0.9	0.3	0.1	2.4
Corissa Yasen	19	0	9.9	.404	.000	.500	1.1	0.3	0.9	0.1	2.7
Danielle Viglione	7	0	4.3	.273	.250	N/A	0.6	0.1	0.1	0.0	1.0
Denique Graves	22	0	3.9	.222	N/A	.500	0.7	0.0	0.0	0.3	0.7

^{‡}Waived/Released during the season
^{†}Traded during the season
^{≠}Acquired during the season

- Ruthie Bolton ranked second in the WNBA in points with 447 points.
- Ruthie Bolton ranked third in the WNBA in field goals with 164.
- Ruthie Bolton ranked fourth in the WNBA in Minutes per game with 35.3
- Ruthie Bolton ranked second in the WNBA in points per game with 19.4
- Ruthie Bolton was tied for sixth in the WNBA in steals with 54.
- Latasha Byears ranked fifth in the WNBA in total rebounds with 193
- Latasha Byears ranked ninth in the WNBA in Field Goal Percentage (.459)
- Bridgette Gordon ranked first in the WNBA in Minutes per game with 35.0
- Bridgette Gordon ranked ninth in the WNBA in Free Throw Pct with .785
- Pamela McGee ranked eighth in the WNBA in Field Goal Percentage (.460)
- Chantel Tremitiere was tied for sixth in the WNBA in steals with 54.
- Chantel Tremitiere ranked first in the WNBA in Minutes per game with 37.5

== Awards and honors ==
- Ruthie Bolton: Led WNBA, 3-Pt Field Goal Attempts, 192
- Ruthie Bolton: Second in WNBA, 3-Pt Field Goals, 66
- Latasha Byears: Led WNBA, Offensive Rebounds, 87
- Chantel Tremitiere: Led WNBA, Minutes Played 1051
- Chantel Tremitiere: Led WNBA, Turnovers, 122
- Chantel Tremitiere: Led WNBA, Minutes per game, 37.5
