= 2015–16 North Dakota State Bison women's basketball team =

Intercollegiate basketball season

2015–16 North Dakota State Bison women's basketball
- Conference: Summit League
- Record: 7–22 (2–14 The Summit)
- Head coach: Maren Walseth (2nd season)
- Assistant coaches: Kachine Alexander; Keith Dickhudt; Patrick Harrison
- Home arena: Bentson Bunker Fieldhouse; Scheels Arena

2015–16 Summit League women's basketball standings
	Conf.				Overall
Team	W		L	PCT	W		L	PCT
South Dakota	15	–	1	.938	32	–	6	.842
South Dakota State †	13	–	3	.813	27	–	7	.794
IUPUI	11	–	5	.688	21	–	11	.656
Oral Roberts	10	–	6	.625	14	–	16	.467
Western Illinois	8	–	8	.500	16	–	16	.500
Omaha	7	–	9	.438	15	–	15	.500
IPFW	3	–	13	.188	7	–	23	.233
Denver	3	–	13	.188	5	–	25	.167
North Dakota State	2	–	14	.125	7	–	22	.241
† 2016 Summit League Tournament winner As of April 2, 2016; Rankings from AP Poll

The 2015–16 North Dakota State Bison women's basketball team represented North Dakota State University in the 2015–16 NCAA Division I women's basketball season. The Bison, led second year head by Maren Walseth, played their home games at the Bentson Bunker Fieldhouse with 2 games at Scheels Arena, due to renovations at the Bison Sports Arena, and were members of The Summit League. They finished the season 7–22, 2–14 in Summit League play to finish in last place. They failed to qualify for The Summit League women's tournament.

== Roster ==
2015–16 North Dakota State Bison women's basketball team
Players
Coaches

Pos.	#	Name	Height	Year	Previous school	Hometown
G	4	Megan Gamble	5 ft 7 in (1.7 m)	Fr	Central HS	Omaha, NE
G	5	Brooke Yaggie	5 ft 9 in (1.75 m)	So	Lincoln HS	Thief River Falls, MN
G	11	Taylor Thunstdt	5 ft 8 in (1.73 m)	So	New London-Spicer HS	Spicer, MN
F	12	Holly Johnson	6 ft 0 in (1.83 m)	Sr	Minot HS	Minot, ND
G	14	Brittany Wiebe	5 ft 9 in (1.75 m)	RS Jr	Crocus Plains HS	Brandon, MB
G	23	Kennedy Childers	5 ft 9 in (1.75 m)	Fr	Dowling Catholic HS	Johnston, IA
G	25	Hannah Breske	6 ft 0 in (1.83 m)	Jr	Central Cass HS	Casselton, ND
F	30	Emily Spier	6 ft 1 in (1.85 m)	Jr	Buffalo HS	Buffalo, MN
G	32	Marena Whittle	5 ft 11 in (1.8 m)	Sr	Caulfield HS	Vermont South, Australia
F	34	Brianna Jones	6 ft 1 in (1.85 m)	Jr	Warren Central HS; Danville Area CC	Indianapolis, IN

Head coach

- Maren Walseth (Penn State)

Assistant coach(es)

- Kachine Alexander (Iowa)
- Keith Dickhudt (North Dakota State)
- Patrick Harrison (Wichita State)

Legend

- (C) Team captain
- (S) Suspended
- (I) Ineligible
- (W) Walk-on
- Injured
- Current redshirt

Roster

== Schedule ==
Date time, TV	Rank^{#}	Opponent^{#}	Result	Record	Site (attendance) city, state
Exhibition
11/05/2015*; 7:00 pm		Minnesota–Crookston	L 73–76		Bentson Bunker Fieldhouse; Fargo, ND
Non-conference regular season
11/13/2015*; 7:00 pm		New Mexico State	L 69–79	0–1	Bentson Bunker Fieldhouse (587); Fargo, ND
11/15/2015*; 2:00 pm		College of Saint Mary	W 88–68	1–1	Bentson Bunker Fieldhouse (342); Fargo, ND
11/19/2015*; 7:00 pm		Valley City State	W 85–77	2–1	Bentson Bunker Fieldhouse (465); Fargo, ND
11/22/2015*; 12:00 pm		Maine	L 51–82	2–2	Bentson Bunker Fieldhouse (404); Fargo, ND
11/27/2015*; 8:30 pm		at San Diego State; SDSU Thanksgiving Classic	L 54–64	2–3	Viejas Arena (255); San Diego, CA
11/29/2015*; 2:00 pm		vs. Delaware; SDSU Thanksgiving Classic	L 50–62	2–4	Viejas Arena; San Diego, CA
12/05/2015*; 6:00 pm		at Kent State	L 54–75	2–5	MAC Center (451); Kent, OH
12/08/2015*; 7:00 pm		Grand Canyon	L 67–76	2–6	Bentson Bunker Fieldhouse (416); Fargo, ND
12/12/2015*; 2:00 pm, MidcoSN/FCSA		at North Dakota	L 54–71	2–7	Betty Engelstad Sioux Center (2,564); Grand Forks, ND
12/18/2015*; 4:00 pm		vs. North Carolina A&T; Shocker Winter Classic	L 64–72	2–8	Charles Koch Arena (1,237); Wichita, KS
12/19/2015*; 12:00 pm		vs. Prairie View A&M; Shocker Winter Classic	W 79–58	3–8	Charles Koch Arena (1,272); Wichita, KS
12/22/2015*; 11:00 am		at NJIT	W 64–59	4–8	Fleisher Center (332); Newark, NJ
12/28/2015*; 7:00 pm		Cal State Fullerton	W 79–64	5–8	Bentson Bunker Fieldhouse (408); Fargo, ND
The Summit League regular season
12/30/2015; 7:00 pm		at Nebraska–Omaha	L 52–77	5–9 (0–1)	Baxter Arena (506); Omaha, NE
01/03/2016; 4:00 pm, KVLY		South Dakota State	L 69–81	5–10 (0–2)	Scheels Arena (2,422); Fargo, ND
01/07/2016; 8:00 pm		at Denver	L 53–64	5–11 (0–3)	Magness Arena (247); Denver, CO
01/09/2016; 7:00 pm		Oral Roberts	L 42–52	5–12 (0–4)	Bentson Bunker Fieldhouse (220); Fargo, ND
01/14/2016; 7:00 pm		South Dakota	L 94–96 ^{2OT}	5–13 (0–5)	Bentson Bunker Fieldhouse (386); Fargo, ND
01/16/2016; 6:00 pm		at IUPUI	L 44–67	5–14 (0–6)	The Jungle (422); Indianapolis, IN
01/21/2016; 7:00 pm		Western Illinois	L 82–94	5–15 (0–7)	Bentson Bunker Fieldhouse (523); Fargo, ND
01/23/2016; 2:00 pm		IPFW	W 94–85	6–15 (1–7)	Bentson Bunker Fieldhouse (459); Fargo, ND
01/30/2016; 4:30 pm, ESPN3/MidcoSN		at South Dakota	L 54–80	6–16 (1–8)	DakotaDome (1,645); Vermillion, SD
02/04/2016; 7:00 pm		at Oral Roberts	L 58–59	6–17 (1–9)	Mabee Center (676); Tulsa, OK
02/06/2016; 4:30 pm, ESPN3/MidcoSN		at South Dakota State	L 47–81	6–18 (1–10)	Frost Arena (3,236); Brookings, SD
02/12/2016; 7:00 pm		IUPUI	L 63–64	6–19 (1–11)	Bentson Bunker Fieldhouse (559); Fargo, ND
02/14/2016; 2:00 pm		Nebraska–Omaha	W 74–67	7–19 (2–11)	Bentson Bunker Fieldhouse (632); Fargo, ND
02/20/2016; 1:00 pm, NBC ND		Denver	L 45–55	7–20 (2–12)	Scheels Arena (1,075); Fargo, ND
02/25/2016; 7:00 pm		at Western Illinois	L 89–100	7–21 (2–13)	Western Hall (904); Macomb, IL
02/27/2016; 1:00 pm		at IPFW	L 69–85	7–22 (2–14)	Hilliard Gates Sports Center (683); Fort Wayne, IN
*Non-conference game. ^{#}Rankings from AP Poll. (#) Tournament seedings in parentheses. All times are in Central Time.

== See also ==
2015–16 North Dakota State Bison men's basketball team
