= Judy Mosley-McAfee =

American basketball player (1968–2013)

Personal information
- Born: March 17, 1968 Los Angeles, California, U.S.
- Died: September 16, 2013 (aged 45) Temecula, California, U.S.
- Listed height: 6 ft 1 in (1.85 m)

Career information
- High school: La Puente (La Puente, California)
- College: Hawaii (1986–1990)
- WNBA draft: 1997: 1st round, 6th overall pick
- Drafted by: Sacramento Monarchs
- Position: Forward

Career history
- 1997: Sacramento Monarchs

Career highlights
- Big West Player of the Year (1990); 2× First-team All-Big West (1989, 1990); Big West Freshman of the Year (1987); Big West All-Freshman Team (1987); No. 32 retired by the University of Hawaii
- Stats at Basketball Reference

Judy Rae Mosley-McAfee (March 17, 1968 – September 16, 2013) was an American professional basketball player. She played a season for the Sacramento Monarchs.

== College career ==
Mosley-McAfee was a two-time All-American at the University of Hawaii in 1989 and 1990. She is the only player in school history to lead the Rainbow Wahine in scoring and rebounding for four consecutive seasons. She is the school's all-time leader in points (2,479) and rebounds (1,441), averaging 21.7 PPG and 12.6 RPG. She also scored 30 or more points in a game 19 times.

== Professional career ==
Mosley-McAfee made her WNBA debut on June 21, 1997 in a 73–61 win over the Utah Starzz where she recorded 13 points, 7 rebounds and 1 steal. She went on to play 13 games for the Monarchs this season, but this was her only playing time in the WNBA. Mosley-McAfee was signed to the Los Angeles Sparks training camp in 1998 but was waived before the season started and she was not signed by another team afterward.

Her final WNBA game ever was the 13th game of that 1997 season, played on July 21, 1997 in a 57–70 loss to the Phoenix Mercury. In her final game, Mosley-McAfee played for nearly 4 minutes and recorded no stats other than 1 foul and 2 missed field-goals.

== Career statistics ==
=== College ===
Legend
GP	Games played	GS	Games started	MPG	Minutes per game
FG%	Field goal percentage	3P%	3-point field goal percentage	FT%	Free throw percentage
RPG	Rebounds per game	APG	Assists per game	SPG	Steals per game
BPG	Blocks per game	PPG	Points per game	**Bold**	Career high

Year	Team	GP	Points	FG%	3P%	FT%	RPG	APG	SPG	BPG	PPG
1986–87	Hawai'i	28	409	43.0%	NA	73.8%	11.1	0.6	NA		14.6
1987–88	Hawai'i	28	550	50.5%	0%	75.4%	11.6	1.0	0.9	0.3	19.6
1988–89	Hawai'i	28	748	47.2%	0%	**80.8%**	13.4	**1.3**	1.4	**0.5**	**26.7**
1989–90	Hawai'i	**30**	**772**	**51.0%**	0%	77.8%	**14.4**	1.2	**1.7**	0.5	25.7
Career		114	2479	48.3%	0%	77.5%	12.6	1.0	1.0	0.3	21.7

=== WNBA ===
==== Regular season ====
Year	Team	GP	GS	MPG	FG%	3P%	FT%	RPG	APG	SPG	BPG	TO	PPG
1997	Sacramento	13	9	20.4	.440	–	1.000	3.6	.8	.6	.2	1.8	4.2

== International career ==
In 1990, Mosley-McAfee won a gold medal at World University Games.

== Personal life ==
Mosley-McAfee died on September 16, 2013, after a three-year battle with cancer.
