= 2015–16 South Dakota State Jackrabbits women's basketball team =

Intercollegiate basketball season

2015–16 South Dakota State Jackrabbits women's basketball

The Summit League Tournament Champions

NCAA Women's tournament, second round
- Conference: Summit League
- Record: 27–7 (13–3 The Summit)
- Head coach: Aaron Johnston (16th season)
- Assistant coaches: Mike Jewett; Katie Falco; Haylie Linn
- Home arena: Frost Arena

2015–16 Summit League women's basketball standings
	Conf.				Overall
Team	W		L	PCT	W		L	PCT
South Dakota	15	–	1	.938	32	–	6	.842
South Dakota State †	13	–	3	.813	27	–	7	.794
IUPUI	11	–	5	.688	21	–	11	.656
Oral Roberts	10	–	6	.625	14	–	16	.467
Western Illinois	8	–	8	.500	16	–	16	.500
Omaha	7	–	9	.438	15	–	15	.500
IPFW	3	–	13	.188	7	–	23	.233
Denver	3	–	13	.188	5	–	25	.167
North Dakota State	2	–	14	.125	7	–	22	.241
† 2016 Summit League Tournament winner As of April 2, 2016; Rankings from AP Poll

The 2015–16 South Dakota State Jackrabbits women's basketball team represented South Dakota State University in the 2015–16 NCAA Division I women's basketball season. The Jackrabbits, led by sixteenth-year head coach Aaron Johnston, competed in the Summit League and played home games at Frost Arena, in Brookings, South Dakota. They finished the season 27–7, 13–3 in Summit League play to finish in second place. They were champions of the Summit League women's tournament and earned an automatic trip to the NCAA women's tournament, where they upset Miami (FL) in the first round before losing to Stanford in the second round.

== Roster ==
2015–16 South Dakota State Jackrabbits women's basketball team
Players
Coaches

Pos.	#	Name	Height	Year	Previous school	Hometown
G	1	Alexis Alexander	5 ft 7 in (1.7 m)	So	Champlin Park HS	Brooklyn Park, MN
G	3	Annabel Graettinger	5 ft 10 in (1.78 m)	Fr	Muscatine HS	Muscatine, IA
G	4	Gabrielle Boever	5 ft 9 in (1.75 m)	RS Sr	Worthington HS	Worthington, MN
F	5	Tonoia Wade (I) (redshirt)	6 ft 0 in (1.83 m)	So	Kennedy	Bloomington, MN
G/F	10	Kerri Young	6 ft 0 in (1.83 m)	Jr	Mitchell	Mitchell, SD
G	11	Madison Guebert	5 ft 8 in (1.73 m)	Fr	Eastview	Apple Valley, MN
G	12	Macy Miller	6 ft 0 in (1.83 m)	So	Mitchell	Mitchell, SD
G	20	Ena Viso	5 ft 11 in (1.8 m)	Jr	Northeast CC	Copenhagen, Denmark
C	21	Clarissa Ober	6 ft 2 in (1.88 m)	Jr	Glencoe-Silver Lake HS	Glencoe, MN
G	22	Chloe Cornemann	5 ft 8 in (1.73 m)	Sr	Yankton HS	Yankton, SD
G	32	Sydney Palmer	5 ft 11 in (1.8 m)	Fr	T. F. Riggs HS	Pierre, SD
C	35	Tiffaney Flaata	6 ft 2 in (1.88 m)	RS So	Prior Lake HS	Savage, MN
F	43	Jessica Mieras	6 ft 3 in (1.91 m)	Fr	O'Gorman HS	Sioux Falls, SD
F	45	Ellie Thompson	6 ft 1 in (1.85 m)	So	Chaska HS	Chaska, MN

Head coach

- Aaron Johnston (Gustavus Adolphus)

Assistant coach(es)

- Mike Jewett (Augustana (SD))
- Katie Falco (Northern Iowa)
- Haylie Linn (Toledo)

Legend

- (C) Team captain
- (S) Suspended
- (I) Ineligible
- (W) Walk-on
- Injured
- Current redshirt

Roster
Last update: 12/17/15

== Schedule ==
Date time, TV	Rank^{#}	Opponent^{#}	Result	Record	Site (attendance) city, state
Exhibition
10/29/2015*; 6:00 pm		St. Cloud State	W 79–44		Frost Arena (1,455); Brookings, SD
11/05/2015*; 6:00 pm		Mary	W 85–40		Frost Arena (1,365); Brookings, SD
Non-conference regular season
11/13/2015*; 6:00 pm		Marist	W 77–68	1–0	Frost Arena (1,624); Brookings, SD
11/18/2015*; 7:00 pm		Arkansas	W 76–69	2–0	Frost Arena (2,109); Brookings, SD
11/21/2015*; 2:00 pm, MidcoSN		No. 3 Notre Dame	L 64–75	2–1	Frost Arena (5,532); Brookings, SD
11/26/2015*; 7:00 pm		vs. Pittsburgh; Paradise Jam tournament Reef Division	W 55–54	3–1	Sports and Fitness Center (1,024); Saint Thomas, USVI
11/27/2015*; 4:45 pm		vs. No. 6 Maryland; Paradise Jam Tournament Reef Division	L 55–62	3–2	Sports and Fitness Center; Saint Thomas, USVI
11/28/2015*; 4:45 pm		vs. Old Dominion; Paradise Jam Tournament Reef Division	W 71–39	4–2	Sports and Fitness Center; Saint Thomas, USVI
12/03/2015*; 7:00 pm		Portland State	W 74–65	5–2	Frost Arena (1,509); Brookings, SD
12/05/2015*; 4:00 pm		Northern Colorado	W 66–62	6–2	Frost Arena (2,449); Brookings, SD
12/09/2015*; 7:00 pm		Northern Iowa	W 89–86 ^{2OT}	7–2	Frost Arena (1,547); Brookings, SD
12/12/2015*; 7:05 pm		at Creighton	W 53–51	8–2	D. J. Sokol Arena (1,023); Omaha, NE
12/15/2015*; 7:00 pm		No. 16 DePaul	W 88–79	9–2	Frost Arena (1,621); Brookings, SD
12/19/2015*; 5:00 pm, ESPN3		at Green Bay	L 57–58	9–3	Kress Events Center (2,527); Green Bay, WI
12/21/2015*; 6:00 pm, ESPN3		at Bowling Green	W 58–45	10–3	Stroh Center (2,175); Bowling Green, OH
The Summit League regular season
12/30/2015; 8:00 pm		at Denver	W 76–39	11–3 (1–0)	Magness Arena (540); Denver, CO
01/03/2016; 2:00 pm, KVLY		at North Dakota State	W 81–69	12–3 (2–0)	Scheels Arena (2,422); Fargo, ND
01/07/2016; 7:00 pm		Nebraska–Omaha	W 68–58	13–3 (3–0)	Frost Arena (1,628); Brookings, SD
01/13/2016; 6:00 pm		at IPFW	W 61–42	14–3 (4–0)	Hilliard Gates Sports Center (450); Fort Wayne, IN
01/17/2016; 2:00 pm, MidcoSN		South Dakota	L 58–63	14–4 (4–1)	Frost Arena (4,082); Brookings, SD
01/21/2016; 7:00 pm		IUPUI	W 68–66 ^{2OT}	15–4 (5–1)	Frost Arena (1,686); Brookings, SD
01/23/2016; 2:00 pm		Western Illinois	W 85–63	16–4 (6–1)	Frost Arena (1,963); Brookings, SD
01/27/2016; 7:00 pm		at Oral Roberts	W 68–50	17–4 (7–1)	Mabee Center (615); Tulsa, OK
02/04/2016; 7:00 pm		at Nebraska–Omaha	W 65–47	18–4 (8–1)	Baxter Arena (631); Omaha, NE
02/06/2016; 4:30 pm, MidcoSN		North Dakota State	W 81–47	19–4 (9–1)	Frost Arena (3,236); Brookings, SD
02/11/2016; 7:00 pm		Oral Roberts	W 60–48	20–4 (10–1)	Frost Arena (1,698); Brookings, SD
02/13/2016; 2:00 pm, MidcoSN		IPFW	W 92–64	21–4 (11–1)	Frost Arena (3,209); Brookings, SD
02/18/2016; 2:00 pm, MidcoSN		Denver	W 80–52	22–4 (12–1)	Frost Arena (1,823); Brookings, SD
02/20/2016; 2:00 pm, MidcoSN		at South Dakota	L 75–80	22–5 (12–2)	DakotaDome (3,612); Vermillion, SD
02/25/2016; 6:00 pm		at IUPUI	L 60–63	22–6 (12–3)	The Jungle (361); Indianapolis, IN
01/27/2016; 4:30 pm		at Western Illinois	W 66–65	23–6 (13–3)	Western Hall (1,072); Macomb, IL
The Summit League Women's tournament
03/05/2016; 2:30 pm, MidcoSN/ESPN3		vs. IPFW; Quarterfinals	W 80–60	24–6	Denny Sanford Premier Center (3,209); Sioux Falls, SD
03/07/2016; 2:30 pm, MidcoSN/ESPN3		vs. Nebraska–Omaha; Semifinals	W 76–58	25–6	Denny Sanford Premier Center (7,237); Sioux Falls, SD
03/08/2016; 1:00 pm, ESPNU		vs. South Dakota; Championship Game	W 61–55	26–6	Denny Sanford Premier Center (8,647); Sioux Falls, SD
NCAA Women's tournament
03/19/2016*; 5:30 pm, ESPN2	(12 L)	vs. (5 L) No. 19 Miami (FL); First round	W 74–71	27–6	Maples Pavilion; Stanford, CA
03/21/2016*; 8:00 pm, ESPN2	(12 L)	at (4 L) No. 13 Stanford; Second round	L 65–66	27–7	Maples Pavilion (1,961); Stanford, CA
*Non-conference game. ^{#}Rankings from AP Poll. (#) Tournament seedings in parentheses. L=Lexington Region. All times are in Central Time.

== Rankings ==
Ranking movement Legend: ██ Increase in ranking. ██ Decrease in ranking. NR = Not ranked. RV = Received votes.
Poll	Pre	Wk 2	Wk 3	Wk 4	Wk 5	Wk 6	Wk 7	Wk 8	Wk 9	Wk 10	Wk 11	Wk 12	Wk 13	Wk 14	Wk 15	Wk 16	Wk 17	Wk 18	Wk 19	Final
AP	NR	NR	NR	NR	NR	NR	NR	NR	RV	RV	NR	NR	NR	NR	NR	NR	NR	NR	NR	N/A
Coaches	NR	NR	NR	NR	NR	NR	NR	NR	NR	RV	NR	NR	NR	NR	NR	NR	NR	NR	NR	NR

== See also ==
- 2015–16 South Dakota State Jackrabbits men's basketball team
