= Denique Graves =

American basketball player

Personal information
- Born: September 16, 1975 (age 51) Philadelphia, Pennsylvania, U.S.
- Listed height: 6 ft 3 in (1.91 m)
- Listed weight: 212 lb (96 kg)

Career information
- High school: University City (Philadelphia, Pennsylvania)
- College: Howard (1993–1997)
- WNBA draft: 1997: 2nd round, 15th overall pick
- Drafted by: Sacramento Monarchs
- Position: Center
- Number: 33

Career history

Playing
- 1997: Sacramento Monarchs

Coaching
- 2008–2009: Binghamton (assistant)
- 2010–2011: CC of Philadelphia
- 2012: Keystone College

Career highlights
- 3× All-MEAC (1995–1997)
- Stats at Basketball Reference

Denique Monai Graves (born September 16, 1975) is an American former professional basketball player. She played for the Sacramento Monarchs in the Women's National Basketball Association's first season.

== College career ==
Graves left Howard as its fifth all-time leading scorer and fourth all-time leading rebounder.

== Professional career ==
Graves was selected with the 14th overall pick (2nd round, 7th pick) by the Sacramento Monarchs on April 28, 1997. This made her the first player in the WNBA to be drafted from a HBCU (Historically Black College or University). Her debut game was played on June 21, 1997 in a 73–61 win over the Utah Starzz where she recorded two points, three rebounds and two blocks in three minutes of playing time. In her 22nd and final career WNBA game, on August 24, 1997, when the Monarchs defeated the Houston Comets 68–58, Graves recording one rebound and one missed field goal in five minutes and 28 seconds of playing time.

Graves' rookie season was her only season in the WNBA, in which she played 22 games and averaging 4.9 minutes a game. Graves was waived by the Monarchs on May 25, 1998, preceding the 1998 WNBA season. After missing out on the 1998 and 1999 seasons entirely, Graves was signed as a free agent to the Washington Mystics on May 2, 2000. She was waived nine days later on May 11, inevitably not playing in the 2000 season.

Attempting another WNBA comeback, Graves signed a contract with the Orlando Miracle on April 30, 2001. She did not make it past the final round of cuts, being released on May 27, the day before the 2001 WNBA season started. This was her last attempt at returning to the WNBA.

Graves finished her career with totals of 16 points (.7 ppg), 15 rebounds (.7 rpg), and six blocks (.3 bpg).

== Personal life ==
At Howard Graves made the Dean's List three years and earned a bachelor's degree in Science. She graduated in 2008. She joined Keystone College's women's basketball coaching staff in 2012.

== Career statistics ==
Legend
GP	Games played	GS	Games started	MPG	Minutes per game	RPG	Rebounds per game
APG	Assists per game	SPG	Steals per game	BPG	Blocks per game	PPG	Points per game
TO	Turnovers per game	FG%	Field-goal percentage	3P%	3-point field-goal percentage	FT%	Free-throw percentage
**Bold**	Career best	°	League leader

=== WNBA ===
==== Regular season ====
Year	Team	GP	GS	MPG	FG%	3P%	FT%	RPG	APG	SPG	BPG	TO	PPG
1997	Sacramento	22	0	3.9	.222	–	.500	.7	.0	.0	.3	.5	.7

=== College ===
Year	Team	GP	GS	MPG	FG%	3P%	FT%	RPG	APG	SPG	BPG	TO	PPG
1993–94	Howard	**29**	-	-	**54.0**	0.0	51.9	8.8	0.4	0.5	1.1	-	**15.1**
1994–95	Howard	24	-	-	50.8	0.0	44.9	8.4	**0.8**	0.5	2.3	-	14.0
1995–96	Howard	28	-	-	46.7	0.0	**57.7**	**8.9**	0.6	**0.7**	**2.6**	-	14.4
1996–97	Howard	27	-	-	43.4	0.0	52.0	8.2	0.7	0.4	2.4	-	12.1
**Career**		108	-	-	48.7	0.0	52.2	8.6	0.6	0.5	2.1	-	13.9
Statistics retrieved from Sports-Reference.
