= Tina Nicholson =

American basketball player

Personal information
- Born: September 27, 1973 (age 53)
- Listed height: 5 ft 2 in (1.57 m)
- Listed weight: 146 lb (66 kg)

Career information
- High school: Downingtown (Downingtown, Pennsylvania)
- College: Penn State
- WNBA draft: 1997: 3rd round, 20th overall pick
- Drafted by: Cleveland Rockers
- Position: Guard
- Number: 11

Career history
- 1997: Cleveland Rockers

Career highlights
- Third-team All-American – AP (1995); 3x First-team All-Big Ten (1994–1996)
- Stats at Basketball Reference

Kristina J. Nicholson (born September 27, 1973) is a retired American professional basketball player. She was known for her quickness and athleticism and being relatively short. She played one season in the WNBA for the Cleveland Rockers in the 1997 WNBA season. At age 38, she was inducted into the Chester County Sports Hall of Fame.

== High school ==
Nicholson and Tora Suber formed a backcourt duo at Downingtown High School, where she won back-to-back state titles. In total she scored 2,709 points, more than any basketball player, male or female. She graduated from Downingtown High School in 1992.

== College ==
Nicholson averaged 8.4 assists her senior year, third in the nation. She amassed 826 assists for her career at Penn State.

== WNBA career ==
Nicholson was drafted by the Cleveland Rockers in the third round (20th overall pick) in the 1997 WNBA draft. Her debut game was played on June 21, 1997 in a 56 - 76 loss to the Houston Comets where she recorded 9 points, 1 rebound, 2 assists and 1 steal. Her career would end up being incredibly short, as this season with the Rockers was her only season in the league. Her final game in the WNBA was played on August 24, 1997 (two months after her debut) in a 72 - 79 loss to the New York Liberty where she recorded 2 assists and 1 rebound but no points.

Nicholson's sole WNBA season consisted of 24 games played, totalling 48 points, 42 assists, 10 rebounds and 11 steals.

== Personal life ==
Nicholson graduated with a degree in exercise and sports science.

== Career statistics ==
Legend
GP	Games played	GS	Games started	MPG	Minutes per game	RPG	Rebounds per game
APG	Assists per game	SPG	Steals per game	BPG	Blocks per game	PPG	Points per game
TO	Turnovers per game	FG%	Field-goal percentage	3P%	3-point field-goal percentage	FT%	Free-throw percentage
**Bold**	Career best	°	League leader

=== WNBA ===
==== Regular season ====
Year	Team	GP	GS	MPG	FG%	3P%	FT%	RPG	APG	SPG	BPG	TO	PPG
1997	Cleveland	24	14	11.4	.409	.375	.600	.4	1.8	.5	.0	1.2	2.0

=== College ===
Year	Team	GP	GS	MPG	FG%	3P%	FT%	RPG	APG	SPG	BPG	TO	PPG
1992–93	Penn State	28	-	-	39.2	41.3	70.0	1.2	3.6	1.8	0.0	-	7.1
1993–94	Penn State	31	-	-	41.6	42.2	73.4	2.2	6.2	2.5	0.0	-	**12.0**
1994–95	Penn State	31	-	-	36.7	40.9	**84.4**	1.8	8.1	**2.9**	**0.1**	-	9.5
1995–96	Penn State	**34**	-	-	**42.3**	**48.1**	70.6	**2.9**	**8.3**	2.3	**0.1**	-	11.1
**Career**		124	-	-	40.2	35.4	74.5	2.1	6.7	2.4	0.0	-	10.0
Statistics retrieved from Sports-Reference.

== See also ==
- List of NCAA Division I women's basketball players with at least 800 assists
