= 2015–16 IUPUI Jaguars women's basketball team =

American college basketball season

2015–16 IUPUI Jaguars women's basketball
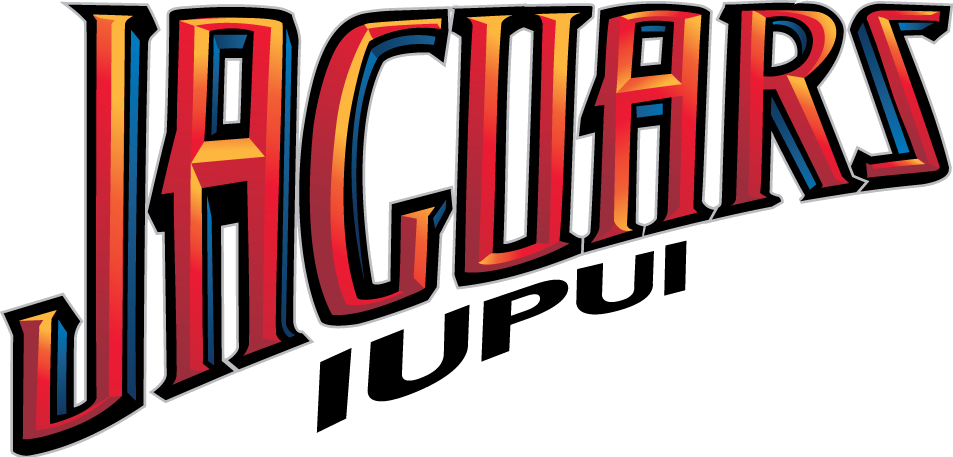

WNIT, Second Round
- Conference: The Summit League
- Record: 21–11 (11–5 The Summit)
- Head coach: Austin Parkinson (6th season)
- Assistant coaches: Alex Mislan; Kristin Drabyn; Janese Banks
- Home arena: The Jungle

2015–16 Summit League women's basketball standings
	Conf.				Overall
Team	W		L	PCT	W		L	PCT
South Dakota	15	–	1	.938	32	–	6	.842
South Dakota State †	13	–	3	.813	27	–	7	.794
IUPUI	11	–	5	.688	21	–	11	.656
Oral Roberts	10	–	6	.625	14	–	16	.467
Western Illinois	8	–	8	.500	16	–	16	.500
Omaha	7	–	9	.438	15	–	15	.500
IPFW	3	–	13	.188	7	–	23	.233
Denver	3	–	13	.188	5	–	25	.167
North Dakota State	2	–	14	.125	7	–	22	.241
† 2016 Summit League Tournament winner As of April 2, 2016; Rankings from AP Poll

The 2015–16 IUPUI Jaguars women's basketball team represented Indiana University – Purdue University Indianapolis during the 2015–16 NCAA Division I women's basketball season. The Jaguars, led by sixth year head coach Austin Parkinson, played their home games at IUPUI Gymnasium (better known as The Jungle). They were members of The Summit League. They finished the season 21–11, 11–5 in Summit League play, to finish in third place. They lost in quarterfinals of the Summit League women's tournament to Omaha. They were invited to the Women's National Invitation Tournament where they defeated Central Michigan in the first round before losing to San Diego in the second round.

== Roster ==
2015–16 IUPUI Jaguars women's basketball team
Players
Coaches

Pos.	#	Name	Height	Year	Previous school	Hometown
G	3	Kelsi Byrd	5 ft 9 in (1.75 m)	Jr	North Montgomery	Crawfordsville, IN
G	4	Ja'Nae Williams	5 ft 8 in (1.73 m)	Fr	Martin Luther King	Detroit, MI
G	10	Nicole Rogers	5 ft 11 in (1.8 m)	Sr	Western	Kokomo, IN
G/F	11	Sara Ross	5 ft 10 in (1.78 m)	RS Fr	Montini Catholic	Naperville, IL
G	12	Caitlyn Tolen	5 ft 10 in (1.78 m)	Jr	Benton Central	Otterbein, IN
G	14	Danielle Lawrence	5 ft 9 in (1.75 m)	So	Butler	Louisville, KY
G	15	Martha Burse	5 ft 6 in (1.68 m)	So	Bradley Bourbonnais	Kankakee, IL
C	23	Shawnece Teague	6 ft 3 in (1.91 m)	RS Jr	Ben Davis	Indianapolis, IN
G	25	Shaquira Scott	5 ft 10 in (1.78 m)	RS Sr	Loyola Academy; Valparaiso	Chicago, IL
F	30	Akilah Sims	5 ft 10 in (1.78 m)	Sr	Snider	Fort Wayne, IN
F	32	Jenna Gunn	6 ft 0 in (1.83 m)	So	Mason	Mason, OH
C	33	Mikale Rogers	6 ft 2 in (1.88 m)	Jr	Lawrence North	Indianapolis, IN
F	35	Allex Brown	6 ft 1 in (1.85 m)	Fr	Perrysburg	Perrysburg, OH
G	42	Sydney Hall	5 ft 6 in (1.68 m)	Fr	Heritage Christian	Fishers, IN

Head coach

- Austin Parkinson (Purdue)

Assistant coach(es)

- Alex Mislan (Green Bay)
- Kristin Drabyn (Tulsa)
- Janese Banks (Oral Roberts)

Legend

- (C) Team captain
- (S) Suspended
- (I) Ineligible
- (W) Walk-on
- Injured
- Current redshirt

Roster

== Schedule ==
Date time, TV	Rank^{#}	Opponent^{#}	Result	Record	Site (attendance) city, state
Exhibition
11/04/2015*; 7:00 pm		Saint Joseph's College	W 70–61		The Jungle; Indianapolis, IN
Non-conference regular season
11/13/2015*; 7:00 pm		at Eastern Illinois	L 71–77 ^{OT}	0–1	Lantz Arena (325); Charleston, IL
11/16/2015*; 1:00 pm		at Marquette	W 60–55	1–1	Al McGuire Center (3,727); Milwaukee, WI
11/21/2015*; 7:00 pm		VCU	W 70–69	2–1	The Jungle (267); Indianapolis, IN
11/24/2015*; 7:00 pm		Oakland City	W 104–30	3–1	The Jungle (267); Indianapolis, IN
11/28/2015*; 3:00 pm		IU Southeast	W 99–50	4–1	The Jungle (325); Indianapolis, IN
12/01/2015*; 7:00 pm, HTSN/ESPN3		Indiana State	W 68–43	5–1	The Jungle (388); Indianapolis, IN
12/04/2015*; 6:00 pm		vs. Stephen F. Austin; Hospitality Hill Challenge	W 62–55 ^{OT}	6–1	The Super Pit; Denton, TX
12/05/2015*; 3:30 pm		at North Texas; Hospitality Hill Challenge	L 67–68	6–2	The Super Pit (867); Denton, TX
12/11/2015*; 8:00 pm		at SIU Edwardsville	W 85–67	7–2	Vadalabene Center (543); Edwardsville, IL
12/13/2015*; 2:00 pm		at Louisville	L 61–70	7–3	KFC Yum! Center (8,686); Louisville, KY
12/18/2015*; 7:00 pm		Belmont	W 62–59	8–3	The Jungle (435); Indianapolis, IN
12/20/2015*; 2:00 pm		Georgia Tech	L 50–60	8–4	The Jungle (377); Indianapolis, IN
12/29/2015*; 7:00 pm		at Evansville	W 68–62	9–4	Ford Center (578); Evansville, IN
The Summit League regular season
01/01/2016; 7:00 pm		at IPFW	W 69–50	10–4 (1–0)	Hilliard Gates Sports Center (713); Fort Wayne, IN
01/03/2016; 2:00 pm		Oral Roberts	L 47–52	10–5 (1–1)	The Jungle (335); Indianapolis, IN
01/09/2016; 5:30 pm		at Western Illinois	W 68–60	11–5 (2–1)	Western Hall (405); Macomb, IL
01/13/2016; 7:00 pm		Nebraska–Omaha	W 75–59	12–5 (3–1)	The Jungle (248); Indianapolis, IN
01/16/2016; 7:00 pm		North Dakota State	W 67–44	13–5 (4–1)	The Jungle (422); Indianapolis, IN
01/21/2016; 8:00 pm		at South Dakota State	L 66–68 ^{2OT}	13–6 (4–2)	Frost Arena (1,686); Brookings, SD
01/23/2016; 2:30 pm		at South Dakota	L 59–65	13–7 (4–3)	DakotaDome (1,523); Vermillion, SD
01/28/2016; 7:00 pm		Denver	W 81–75 ^{2OT}	14–7 (5–3)	The Jungle (557); Indianapolis, IN
01/30/2016; 3:00 pm		at Oral Roberts	W 57–54	15–7 (6–3)	Mabee Center (713); Tulsa, OK
02/06/2016; 3:00 pm		Western Illinois	W 96–87	16–7 (7–3)	The Jungle (352); Indianapolis, IN
02/12/2016; 8:00 pm		at North Dakota State	W 64–63	17–7 (8–3)	Bentson Bunker Fieldhouse (559); Fargo, ND
02/14/2016; 3:00 pm		at Denver	W 67–54	18–7 (9–3)	Magness Arena (325); Denver, CO
02/18/2016; 8:00 pm		at Nebraska–Omaha	L 54–57	18–8 (9–4)	Baxter Arena (475); Omaha, NE
02/21/2016; 2:00 pm, HTSN		IPFW	W 64–53	19–8 (10–4)	The Jungle (539); Indianapolis, IN
02/25/2016; 7:00 pm		South Dakota State	W 63–60	20–8 (11–4)	The Jungle (361); Indianapolis, IN
02/27/2016; 7:00 pm		South Dakota	L 63–74	20–9 (11–5)	The Jungle (525); Indianapolis, IN
The Summit League Women's Tournament
03/06/2016; 3:30 pm, MidcoSN		vs. Nebraska–Omaha; Quarterfinals	L 51–62	20–10	Denny Sanford Premier Center (3,172); Sioux Falls, SD
WNIT
03/17/2016*; 6:00 pm		at Central Michigan; First Round	W 63–55	21–10	McGuirk Arena (533); Sioux Falls, SD
03/19/2016*; 7:00 pm		San Diego; Second Round	L 48–59	21–11	The Jungle (308); Indianapolis, IN
*Non-conference game. ^{#}Rankings from AP Poll. (#) Tournament seedings in parentheses. All times are in Eastern Time.

== See also ==
2015–16 IUPUI Jaguars men's basketball team
