= Linda Hill-MacDonald =

American collegiate basketball coach

Personal information
- Born: August 21, 1948 (age 78)

Career information
- College: West Chester State (1966–1970)

Career history

Coaching
- 1980–1990: Temple
- 1990–1997: Minnesota
- 1997–1999: Cleveland Rockers
- 2000–2003: South Carolina (assistant)
- 2002–2004: Washington Mystics (assistant)
- 2004–2005: South Carolina (assistant)
- 2005–2012: Buffalo
- 2013–2018: Fredonia
- 2018–2020: Canisius (assistant)

Career highlights
- Carol Eckman Award (1989)

Linda Hill-MacDonald (born August 21, 1948) is an American former women's basketball coach.

== Career ==
She was head coach at Fredonia from 2013 to 2018 and at the University at Buffalo from 2005 to 2012.

She was also head coach at Temple University, (1980–90), The University of Minnesota (1990–97), and the WNBA's Cleveland Rockers from 1997 to 1999. She later served as an assistant coach with the Washington Mystics, the University of South Carolina, and retired from coaching in May 2020 while assisting at Canisius.

Originally from Morton, Pennsylvania, Hill-MacDonald has a daughter, Kelli, and a son, Scott, who both reside in the Philadelphia area.

== Head coaching record ==
Legend
Regular season	G	Games coached	W	Games won	L	Games lost	W–L %	Win–loss %
Playoffs	PG	Playoff games	PW	Playoff wins	PL	Playoff losses	PW–L %	Playoff win–loss %

Team	Year	G	W	L	W–L%	Finish	PG	PW	PL	PW–L%	Result
CLE	1997	28	15	13	.536	4th in Eastern	-	-	-	-	N/A
CLE	1998	30	20	10	.667	1st in Eastern	3	1	2	.333	Lost WNBA Semifinals (Phoenix, 1–2)
CLE	1999	32	7	25	.219	6th in Eastern	-	-	-	-	N/A
Career		90	42	48	.467		3	1	2	.333	

== Awards and honors ==
- 1989—Carol Eckman Award
