= Brittany Lange =

American college basketball coach

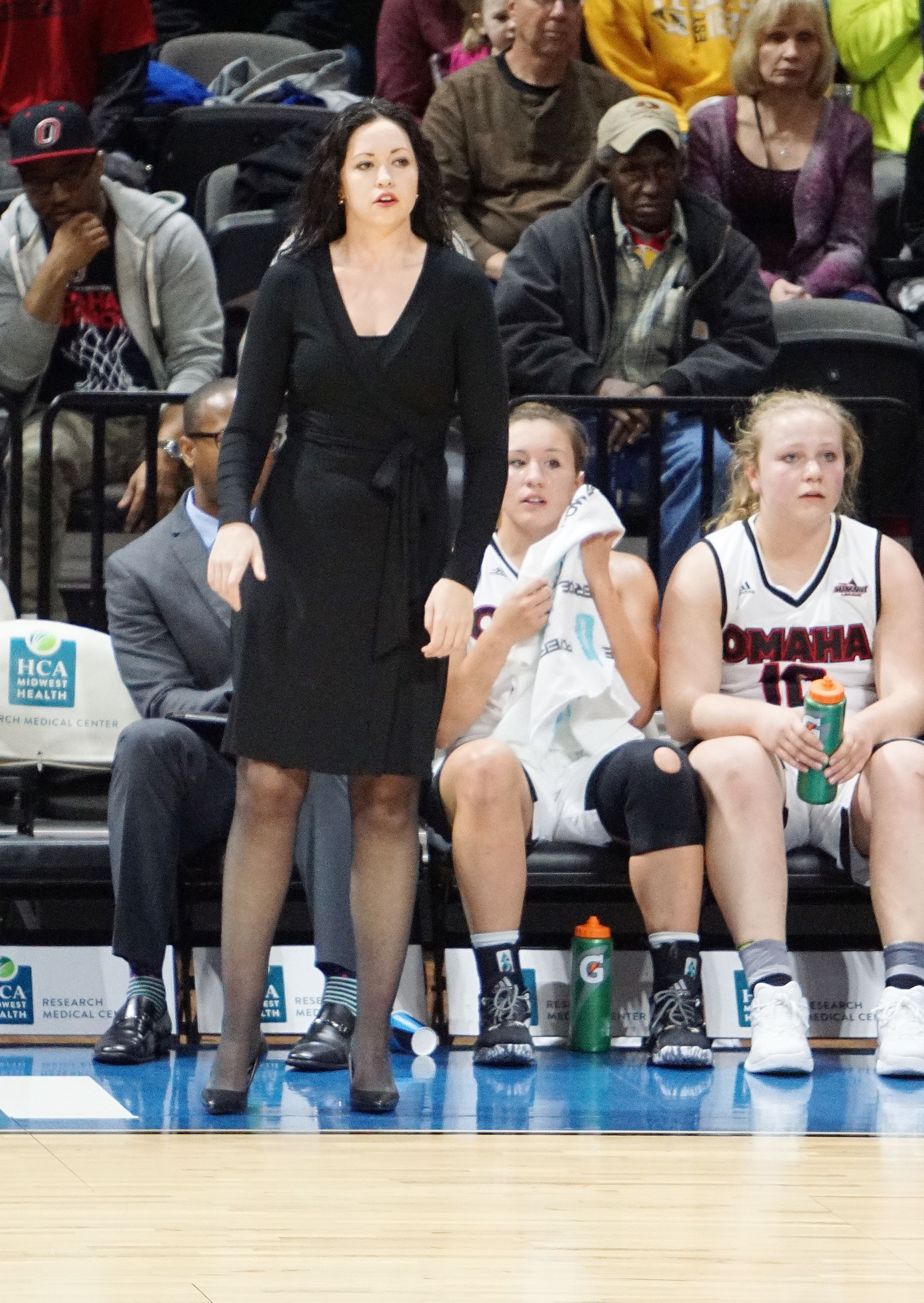
- Lange in 2016

Biographical details
- Born: December 31, 1986 (age 39); Sac City, Iowa, U.S.

Playing career
- 2005–2006: Creighton
- 2006–2008: Iowa State
- Position: Guard

Coaching career (HC unless noted)
- 2008–2010: Iowa State (student coach)
- 2010–2011: St. Edward's (graduate asst.)
- 2011–2012: Omaha (DBO)
- 2012–2013: Omaha (asst.)
- 2013–2020: Omaha
- 2020–2022: Saint Louis (asst.)

Head coaching record
- Overall: 80–124 (.392)

Brittany Lange (born December 31, 1986) is an American college basketball coach who recently served as the head women's basketball coach at Omaha from 2013 until 2020.

== Creighton and Iowa State ==
Lange initially enrolled at Creighton University, but after her freshman year (2005–06), she transferred to Iowa State. Due to injuries, she had limited minutes. Her head coach, Bill Fennelly, persuaded her to remain with the team as a student coach. She served in this position for her final two years at Iowa State.

== Coaching career ==
Brittany spent one season as a graduate assistant coach at St. Edward's in Austin, Texas. Following that season in 2011, she came to Omaha, and initially as Director of Basketball Operations and then as an assistant coach. When the head coach resigned, she was initially named the interim head coach, and then, in December 2013, at the age of 26, was named head coach, one of the youngest head coaches in the country.

After leaving Omaha, Lange served as an assistant coach for the Saint Louis Billikens women's basketball team for two seasons from 2020 until 2022.

== Head coaching record ==
Lange's head coaching record is:

Record table
Season	Team	Overall	Conference	Standing	Postseason
Omaha (Summit League) (2013–2020)
2013–14	Omaha	12–16	4–10	7th	
2014–15	Omaha	10–18	5–11	7th	
2015–16	Omaha	15–15	7–9	6th	
2016–17	Omaha	16–15	8–8	5th	
2017–18	Omaha	12–16	3–11	6th	
2018–19	Omaha	8–21	2–14	9th	
2019–20	Omaha	7–23	2–14	8th	
Omaha:		80–124 (.392)	31–77 (.287)		
Total:		80–124 (.392)			
