= Marcie Alberts =

American basketball player and coach

Personal information
- Born: April 12, 1975 (age 51) Wooster, Ohio

Career information
- High school: Wooster (Wooster, Ohio)
- College: Ohio State (1993–1997)
- WNBA draft: 1997: undrafted
- Position: Guard

Career history

Playing
- 1997: Cleveland Rockers

Coaching
- 1999–01: Toledo (grad assistant)
- 2001–08: Orrville High School (head coach)
- 2008–13: Heidelberg University (head coach)
- 2013–present: IPFW (assistant coach)
- Stats at Basketball Reference

Marcie Alberts (born April 12, 1975) is an American former professional basketball player and current coach. Alberts participated in the inaugural season of the WNBA.

== College career ==
Alberts played for Ohio State University during her college athletic career from 1993 to 1997. Her overall team's record through her college years was 64 - 56. She had 91.3% of her free-throw attempts in 1996–97, the highest recorded free-throw percentage for an Ohio State senior. She made 203 during her OSU years which was the 2nd-highest 3-pointers made in a Buckeye's career at the time.

Alberts graduated from OSU in 1997 with a Bachelor's of Science degree.

== WNBA ==
After graduating from OSU, although she would not be selected in the draft, Alberts was still able to play in the WNBA's inaugural season for the Cleveland Rockers. Her debut game would be played on July 7, 1997, in an 81 - 70 win over the Los Angeles Sparks where she recorded 1 assist and no other stats in 7 minutes of playing time.

Alberts' WNBA career would be incredibly short, as she only played 5 games with the Rockers in 1997 and these ended up being her only 5 games in the league. Her 5th and final game was played on July 15, 1997, where the Rockers would lose to the New York Liberty 59 - 76 with Alberts recording 1 assist, 1 rebound and 1 steal, but no points.

In her 5 WNBA career games, Alberts did not score a single point (missing both of her only 2 field goals attempts and never attempting a free throw) and had totals of 30 minutes playing time, 1 rebound, 3 assists and 2 steals.

== Coaching career ==
She was head coach of Orrville High School's girls basketball team, earning a 117 - 45 record during her tenure. She then became the women's head basketball coach at Heidelberg College. After not being retained following the 2012-2013 basketball season, Alberts was hired in July 2013 to become head girls basketball coach at Mount Vernon High School in Mount Vernon, Ohio. In August 2013, Alberts joined the NCAA Division I Women's Basketball coaching staff as an assistant coach for IPFW. She was promoted to first assistant before the 2018-2019 basketball season.

She was inducted into the Ohio Basketball Hall of Fame on May 21, 2016, at the 11th Annual Ceremony in Columbus.

== Career statistics ==
Legend
GP	Games played	GS	Games started	MPG	Minutes per game	RPG	Rebounds per game
APG	Assists per game	SPG	Steals per game	BPG	Blocks per game	PPG	Points per game
TO	Turnovers per game	FG%	Field-goal percentage	3P%	3-point field-goal percentage	FT%	Free-throw percentage
**Bold**	Career best	°	League leader

=== WNBA ===
==== Regular season ====
Year	Team	GP	GS	MPG	FG%	3P%	FT%	RPG	APG	SPG	BPG	TO	PPG
1997	Cleveland	5	0	6.0	.000	.000	–	.2	.6	.4	.0	.6	.0
