= Crofton Academy =

Academy in Crofton, Wakefield, West Yorkshire, England

Location
- High Street; Crofton, Wakefield, West Yorkshire, WF4 1NF; England
- Coordinates: 53°39′24″N 1°25′48″W

Information
- Type: Academy
- Motto: Care, Aspire, Succeed
- Religious affiliation: none
- Founder: Richmal Mangal
- Specialist: Mathematics and Computing College
- Department for Education URN: 137001 Tables
- Ofsted: Reports
- Headteacher: Peter Walker
- Age: 11 to 16
- Enrolment: 1,020
- Website: http://www.croftonacademy.org.uk/

Crofton Academy (formerly Crofton High School) is an 11-16 state secondary school outside Wakefield in West Yorkshire, England. The school is also an academy.

== History ==
A school has been on this site for the past 200 years, with Richmal Mangnall opening the Crofton School for young ladies, in the Crofton Old Hall, which is now part of the school's complex. The old high school was built in 1964, after the village rapidly expanded and saw a huge housing boom, which saw the demand for a larger school. Many estates such as Manorfields, Meadowfields and Ashdene were built at this time, demanding even more schools. In August 1995, the school suffered a serious fire. It was rebuilt on the same site and reopened on 30 October 1998.

In August 2011 the school became an academy with specialist status in Mathematics and Computing.

In May 2017 the school dropped sharply in its Ofsted grade under new Ofsted guidelines, as it dropped from "Outstanding" to "Requires improvement" (formerly "Satisfactory"). In the 2019 Ofsted report, the school had improved to a "Good" rating in the category of "Personal development" but retained the lower rating in all other categories. The most recent inspection in June 2023 concluded that Crofton Academy was a 'Good' school.

== Collaboration with Wakefield College ==
In 2012, Crofton, together with Wakefield College, proposed the building of a sixth form centre. The staff was to be from Wakefield College and Crofton Academy.

The sixth form remained until May 2018 when it was closed down, and turned into a modern foreign languages block (with the downstairs used for in school sanctions) as is shown in the schools current official map.
