= 1880 =

1880 in various calendars
- Gregorian calendar: 1880; MDCCCLXXX
- Ab urbe condita: 2633
- Armenian calendar: 1329; ԹՎ ՌՅԻԹ
- Assyrian calendar: 6630
- Baháʼí calendar: 36–37
- Balinese saka calendar: 1801–1802
- Bengali calendar: 1286–1287
- Berber calendar: 2830
- British Regnal year: 43 Vict. 1 – 44 Vict. 1
- Buddhist calendar: 2424
- Burmese calendar: 1242
- Byzantine calendar: 7388–7389
- Chinese calendar: 己卯年 (Earth Rabbit); 4577 or 4370 — to — 庚辰年 (Metal Dragon); 4578 or 4371
- Coptic calendar: 1596–1597
- Discordian calendar: 3046
- Ethiopian calendar: 1872–1873
- Hebrew calendar: 5640–5641
- Hindu calendars
- Vikram Samvat: 1936–1937
- Shaka Samvat: 1801–1802
- Kali Yuga: 4980–4981
- Holocene calendar: 11880
- Igbo calendar: 880–881
- Iranian calendar: 1258–1259
- Islamic calendar: 1297–1298
- Japanese calendar: Meiji 13 (明治１３年)
- Javanese calendar: 1808–1809
- Julian calendar: Gregorian minus 12 days
- Korean calendar: 4213
- Minguo calendar: 32 before ROC 民前32年
- Nanakshahi calendar: 412
- Thai solar calendar: 2422–2423
- Tibetan calendar: ས་མོ་ཡོས་ལོ་ (female Earth-Hare); 2006 or 1625 or 853 — to — ལྕགས་ཕོ་འབྲུག་ལོ་ (male Iron-Dragon); 2007 or 1626 or 854

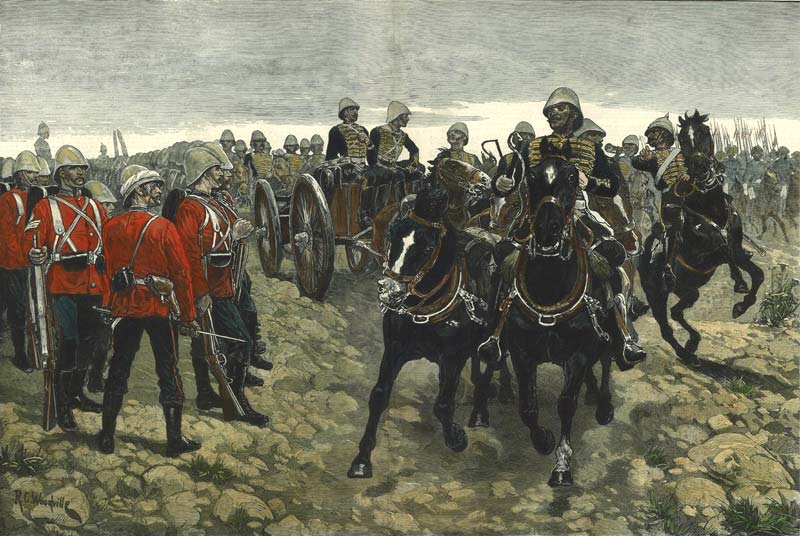
July 27: Battle of Maiwand

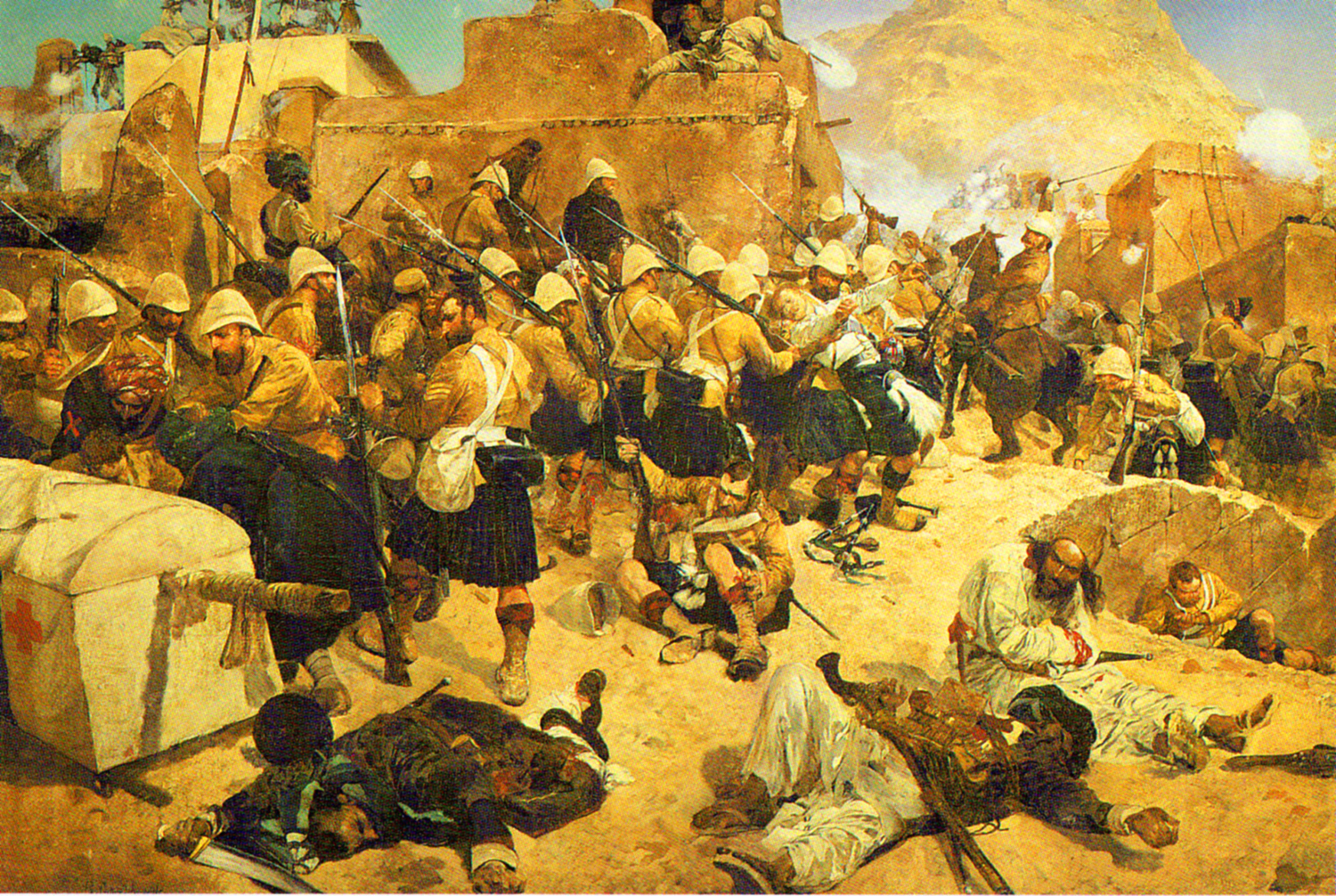
September 1: Battle of Kandahar (1880)

1880 (MDCCCLXXX) was a leap year starting on Thursday of the Gregorian calendar and a leap year starting on Tuesday of the Julian calendar, the 1880th year of the Common Era (CE) and Anno Domini (AD) designations, the 880th year of the 2nd millennium, the 80th year of the 19th century, and the 1st year of the 1880s decade. As of the start of 1880, the Gregorian calendar was 12 days ahead of the Julian calendar, which remained in localized use until 1923.

== Events ==
=== January ===
- January 27 – Thomas Edison is granted a patent for the incandescent light bulb. Edison filed for a US patent for an electric lamp using "a carbon filament or strip coiled and connected ... to platina contact wires." Although the patent described several ways of creating the carbon filament, including using "cotton and linen thread, wood splints, papers coiled in various ways," Edison and his team later discovered that a carbonized bamboo filament could last more than 1200 hours.
- January
  - The international White slave trade affair scandal in Brussels is exposed and attracts international infamy.
  - The Gokstad ship is found in Norway, the first Viking ship burial to be excavated.

=== February ===
- February 2
  - The first electric streetlight is installed in Wabash, Indiana.
  - The first successful shipment of frozen mutton from Australia arrives in London, aboard the SS Strathleven.
- February 4 – The Black Donnelly Massacre takes the lives of five members of one family in Biddulph Township, Middlesex County, Ontario, Canada.
- February 24 – The SS Columbia, which will be the first outside usage of Thomas Edison's incandescent light bulb, is launched at the Delaware River Iron Ship Building and Engine Works of John Roach & Sons in Chester, Pennsylvania.

=== March ===
- March 4 – The Belgian ship Mercator founders off the coast of the Netherlands port of Vlissingen with the loss of her entire crew of more than 60 people.
- March 19 – The horse Empress and its jockey, Tommy Beasley, win the 1880 Grand National
- March 20 – For the first and last time in its history, the annual side-by-side rowing race between the 8-member teams of University of Oxford and the University of Cambridge on the River Thames is postponed. The call comes because of a thick fog that makes visibility impossible. Two days later, Oxford wins the race by 3+3/4 lengths.

=== April ===
- April 18 – 1880 United Kingdom general election: William Ewart Gladstone defeats Benjamin Disraeli, to become Prime Minister for the second time.
- April 19 – The Prime Minister of Sweden, Louis De Geer, resigns over the defeat of a defense reform bill in the country's Riksdag; he is succeeded by Count Arvid Posse (1880–1883).
- April 27 – The Royal University of Ireland is founded by charter, allowing the Catholic University of Ireland to re-form as University College Dublin.
- April – The government of Cape Colony sets a deadline for the Basuto people to surrender their weapons; non-compliance leads to the Basuto Gun War.

=== May ===
- May 2 – After having her lights installed by Edison's personnel, the SS Columbia is lit up for the first time at the foot of Wall Street, in New York City.
- May 13 – In Menlo Park, New Jersey, Thomas Edison performs the first test of his electric railway.

=== June ===
- June 1 – Tinius Olsen is awarded a United States Patent, for the Little Giant Testing Machine.
- June 28 – Australian police capture bank robber Ned Kelly, after a gun battle at Glenrowan, Victoria.
- June 29 – France annexes Tahiti.
- June – The SS Columbia sets off on her maiden voyage around Cape Horn to Portland, Oregon, carrying 13 locomotives and 200 railcars.

=== July ===
- July 14 – Dorchester Penitentiary opens in Canada.
- July 22 – Abdur Rahman Khan becomes Emir of Afghanistan.
- July 27 – Second Anglo-Afghan War – Battle of Maiwand: Afghan troops under Ayub Khan defeat British and Indian forces, under Brigadier General George Burrows.
- July – John Venn popularises Venn diagrams.

=== August ===
- August 24 – The SS Columbia completes her maiden voyage, arriving without incident in Portland, Oregon, after a stopover in San Francisco.
- August 26 – Competing circus owners P. T. Barnum and James A. Bailey sign a contract in Bridgeport, Connecticut, to create the Barnum & Bailey Circus. In 1907, the circus will merge forces with another competitor, the Ringling Brothers Circus.

=== September ===
- September 1 – Second Anglo-Afghan War – Battle of Kandahar: General Frederick Roberts, commanding British forces, defeats the Afghan troops of Mohammad Ayub Khan, bringing an end to the war.
- September 14 – Cologne Cathedral is completed, after construction began in 1248, 632 years earlier.

=== October ===
- October 1 – German company Munich Re is founded in Munich.
- October 6 – The University of Southern California opens its doors to 53 students and 10 faculty.
- October 15
  - A blizzard marks the start of the Hard Winter in North America.
  - Mexican soldiers kill Victorio, one of the greatest Apache military strategists.
- October 28 – The first stone is laid for the Clarkson Memorial in Wisbech, England.

=== November ===
- November 2 – 1880 United States presidential election: James Garfield defeats Winfield S. Hancock.
- November 4 – The first cash register is patented by James and John Ritty of Dayton, Ohio.
- November 9 – A major earthquake strikes Zagreb and destroys many buildings, including Zagreb Cathedral.
- November 11 – Australian bushranger and bank robber Ned Kelly is hanged in Melbourne.
- November 22 – Vaudeville actress Lillian Russell makes her debut at Tony Pastor's Theatre, in New York City.

=== December ===
- December 1 – Manuel González Flores becomes the 31st President of Mexico.
- December 20 – First Boer War: The Battle of Bronkhorstspruit results in a Boer victory over the British.
- December 30 – The Transvaal becomes a republic, and Paul Kruger becomes its first president.

=== Date unknown ===
- Pierre Savorgnan de Brazza signs a treaty of protection with the chief of the large Teke tribe, and begins to establish a French protectorate on the north bank of the Congo River.
- Piezoelectricity is discovered by Pierre Curie and Jacques Curie.
- The Capuchin catacombs of Palermo are officially closed (there will be some burials afterwards).
- The Department of Scientific Temperance Instruction, of the Woman's Christian Temperance Union, is established in the United States.

== Births ==
=== January–February ===
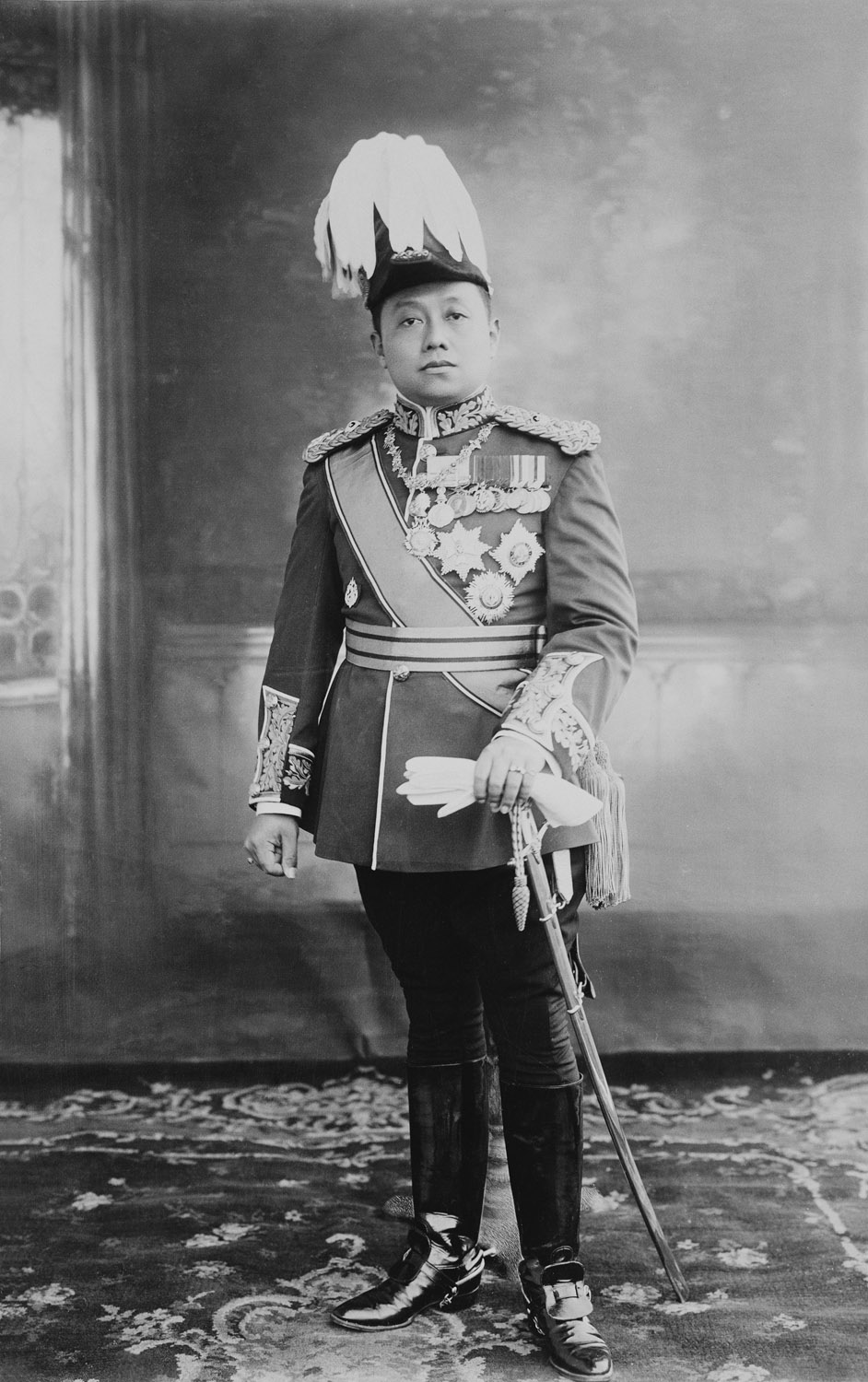
King Vajiravudh

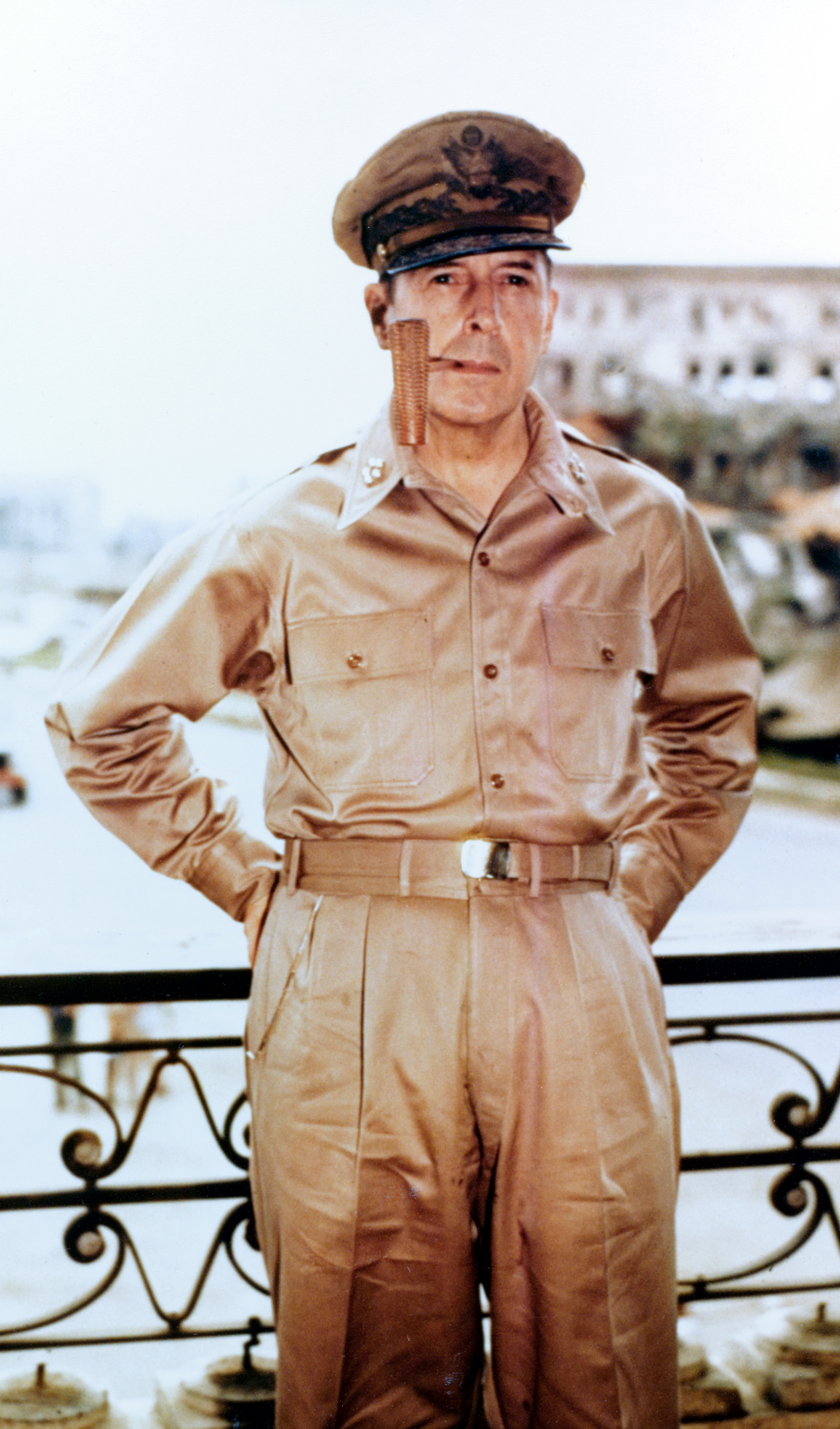
Douglas MacArthur

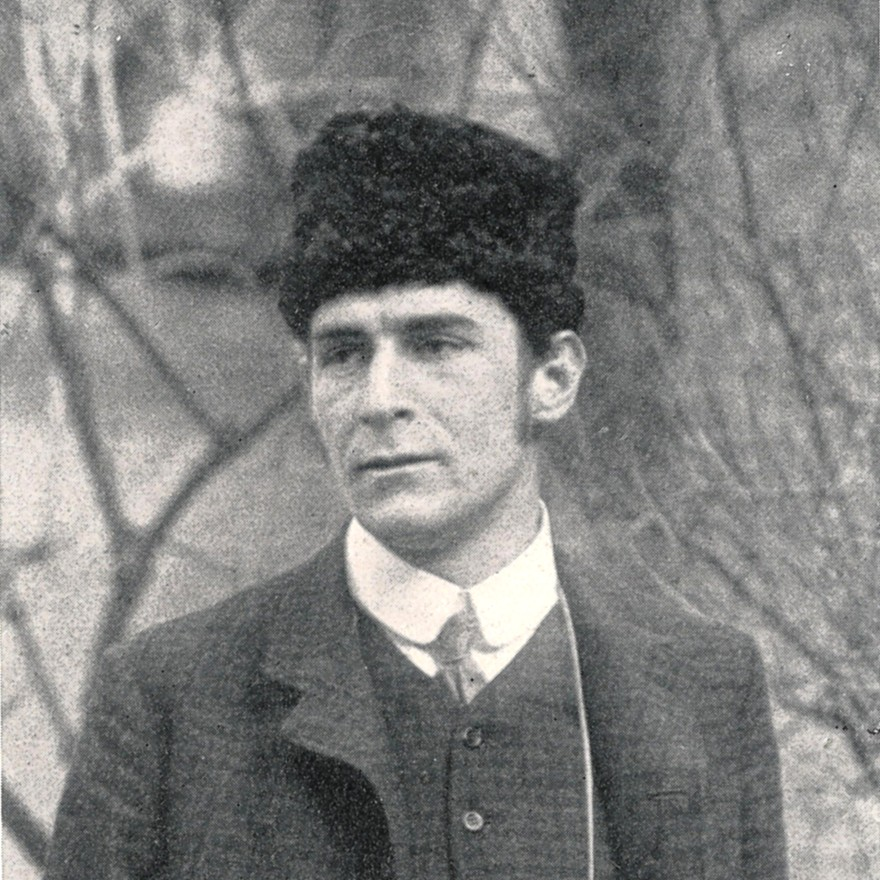
Franz Marc

- January 1 – Vajiravudh, Rama VI, King of Siam (d. 1925)
- January 2 – Louis Charles Breguet, French aircraft designer, builder and aviation pioneer (d. 1955)
- January 3 – Francis Browne, Irish Jesuit priest, famous for his last photos of the RMS Titanic (d. 1960)
- January 6 – Tom Mix, American Western film actor (d. 1940)
- January 10
  - Manuel Azaña, 2nd President of the Spanish Second Republic, 55th Prime Minister of Spain (d. 1940)
  - Grock (Charles Adrien Wettach), Swiss-born clown (d. 1959)
- January 11 – Rudolph Palm, Curaçao-born composer (d. 1950)
- January 17 – Mack Sennett, Canadian-born comedy film director, producer (d. 1960)
- January 18 – Paul Ehrenfest, Austrian-Dutch physicist (d. 1933)
- January 19 – Henryk Minkiewicz, Polish general and politician (d. 1940)
- January 26 – Douglas MacArthur, American general (d. 1964)
- January 29 – W. C. Fields, American actor, comedian (d. 1946)
- February 5 – Gabriel Voisin, French aviation pioneer (d. 1973)
- February 8 – Franz Marc, German artist (d. 1916)
- February 12 – George Preca, Maltese saint (d. 1962)
- February 14 – Frederick J. Horne, American four-star admiral (d. 1959)
- February 19 – Álvaro Obregón, 39th President of Mexico (d. 1928)
- February 21 – Waldemar Bonsels, German writer (d. 1952)
- February 22
  - Eric Lemming, Swedish athlete (d. 1930)
  - Frigyes Riesz, Hungarian mathematician (d. 1956)
- February 26 – Lionel Logue, Australian speech and language therapist (d. 1953)

=== March–April ===
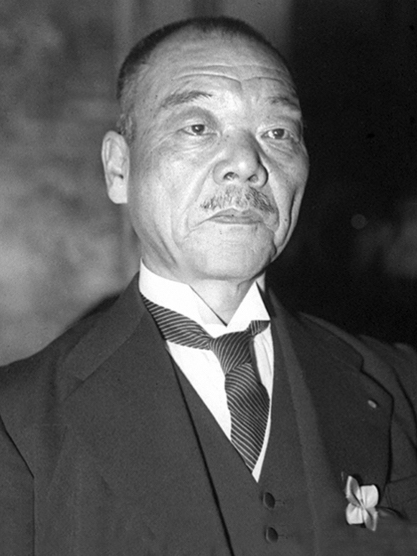
Kuniaki Koiso

- March 1 – Lytton Strachey, English critic and biographer (d. 1932)
- March 2 – René Vallon, French aviator (d. 1911)
- March 15 – Montagu Love, English actor (d. 1943)
- March 17 – Lawrence Oates, British army officer and Antarctic explorer (d. 1912)
- March 18 – Kalle Hakala, Finnish politician (d. 1947)
- March 21 – Broncho Billy Anderson, American actor (d. 1971)
- March 22 – Kuniaki Koiso, Prime Minister of Japan (d. 1950)
- March 23 – Heikki Ritavuori, Finnish Minister of the Interior (d. 1922)
- March 27 – Ruth Hanna McCormick, American politician, activist and publisher (d. 1944)
- March 28 – Louis Wolheim, American character actor (d. 1931)
- March 30 – Seán O'Casey, Irish writer (d. 1964)
- April 15 – Max Wertheimer, Austrian-born psychologist, father of Gestalt Theory (d. 1943)
- April 18 – Sam Crawford, American Baseball Hall of Famer (d. 1968)

=== May–June ===
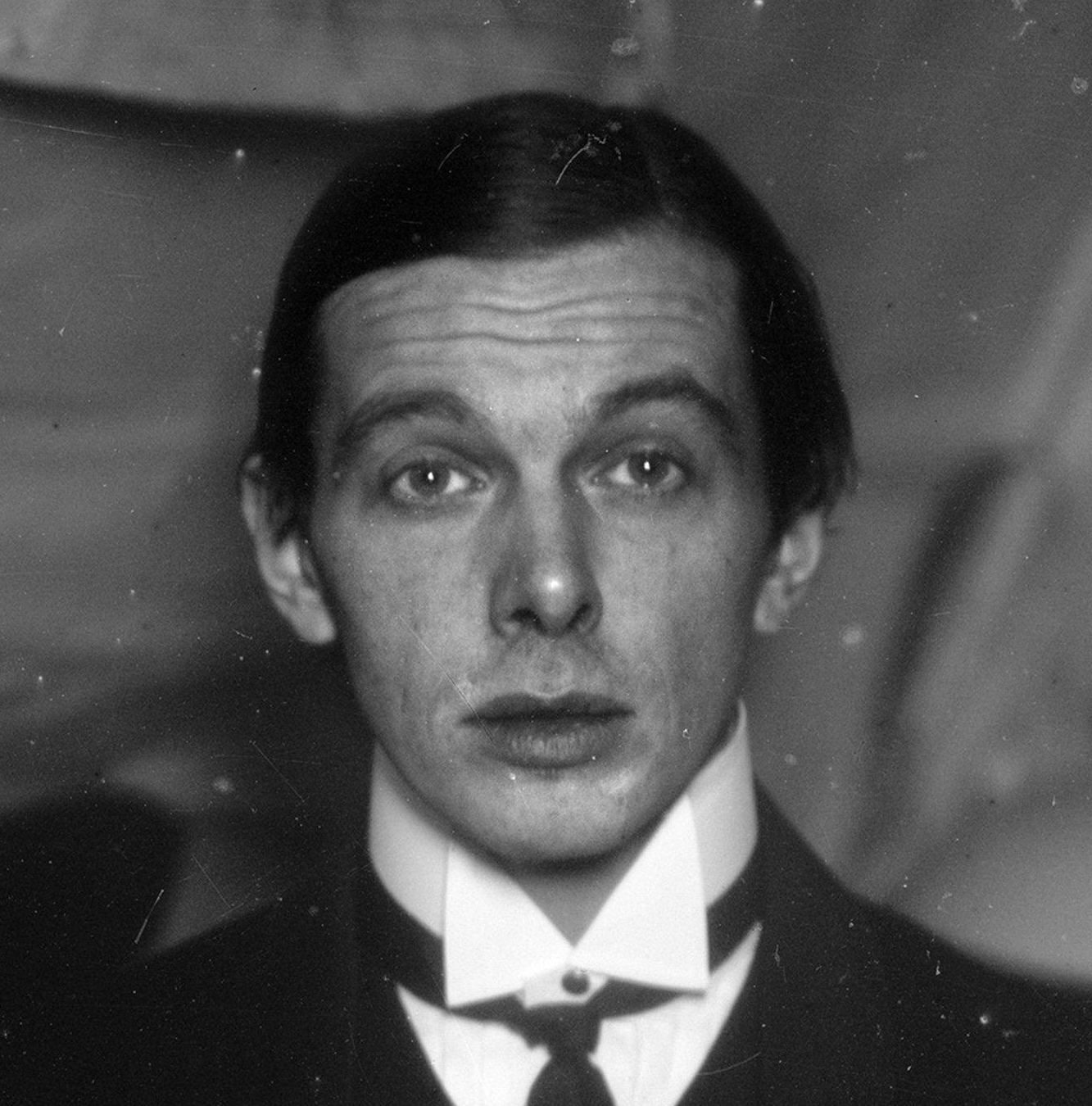
Ernst Ludwig Kirchner

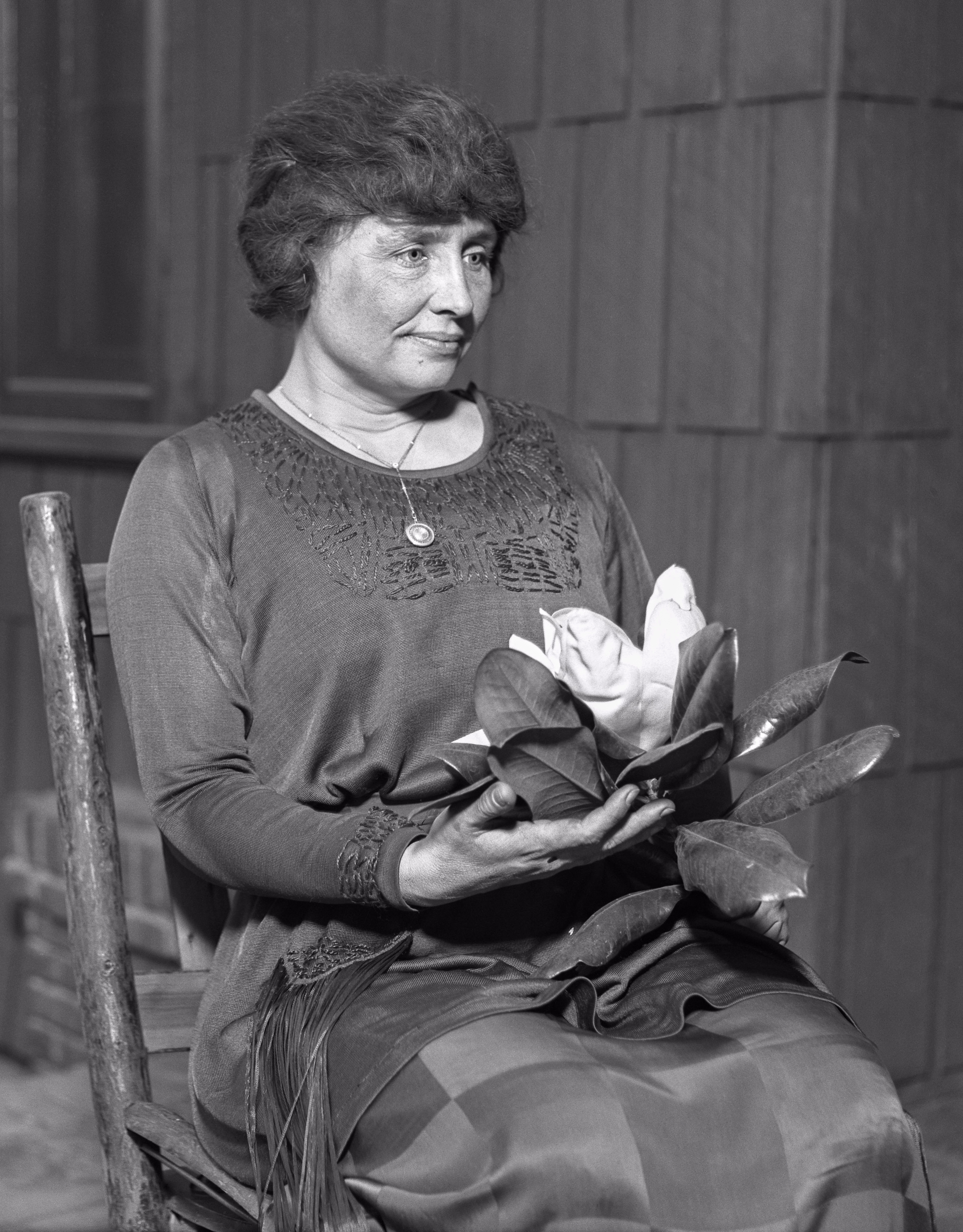
Helen Keller

- May 5 – Adrian Carton de Wiart, Belgian-born British general (d. 1963)
- May 6
  - Edmund Ironside, 1st Baron Ironside, British field marshal (d. 1959)
  - Ernst Ludwig Kirchner, German painter (d. 1938)
  - William Joseph Simmons, American founder of the second Ku Klux Klan (d. 1945)
- May 14
  - B. C. Forbes, Scottish-born financial publisher (d. 1954)
  - Wilhelm List, German field marshal (d. 1971)
- May 21 – Tudor Arghezi, Romanian writer (d. 1967)
- May 25 – Alf Common, English footballer (d. 1946)
- May 29 – Oswald Spengler, German philosopher (d. 1936)
- June 6 – W. T. Cosgrave, Irish politician (d. 1965)
- June 15 – Osami Nagano, Japanese admiral (d. 1947)
- June 17 – Carl Van Vechten, American writer and photographer (d. 1964)
- June 24 – João Cândido, Brazilian sailor (d. 1969)
- June 27 – Helen Keller, American spokeswoman for the deaf and blind, writer and lecturer (d. 1968)
- June 29 – Ludwig Beck, German general, Chief of the General Staff (d. 1944)

=== July–August ===
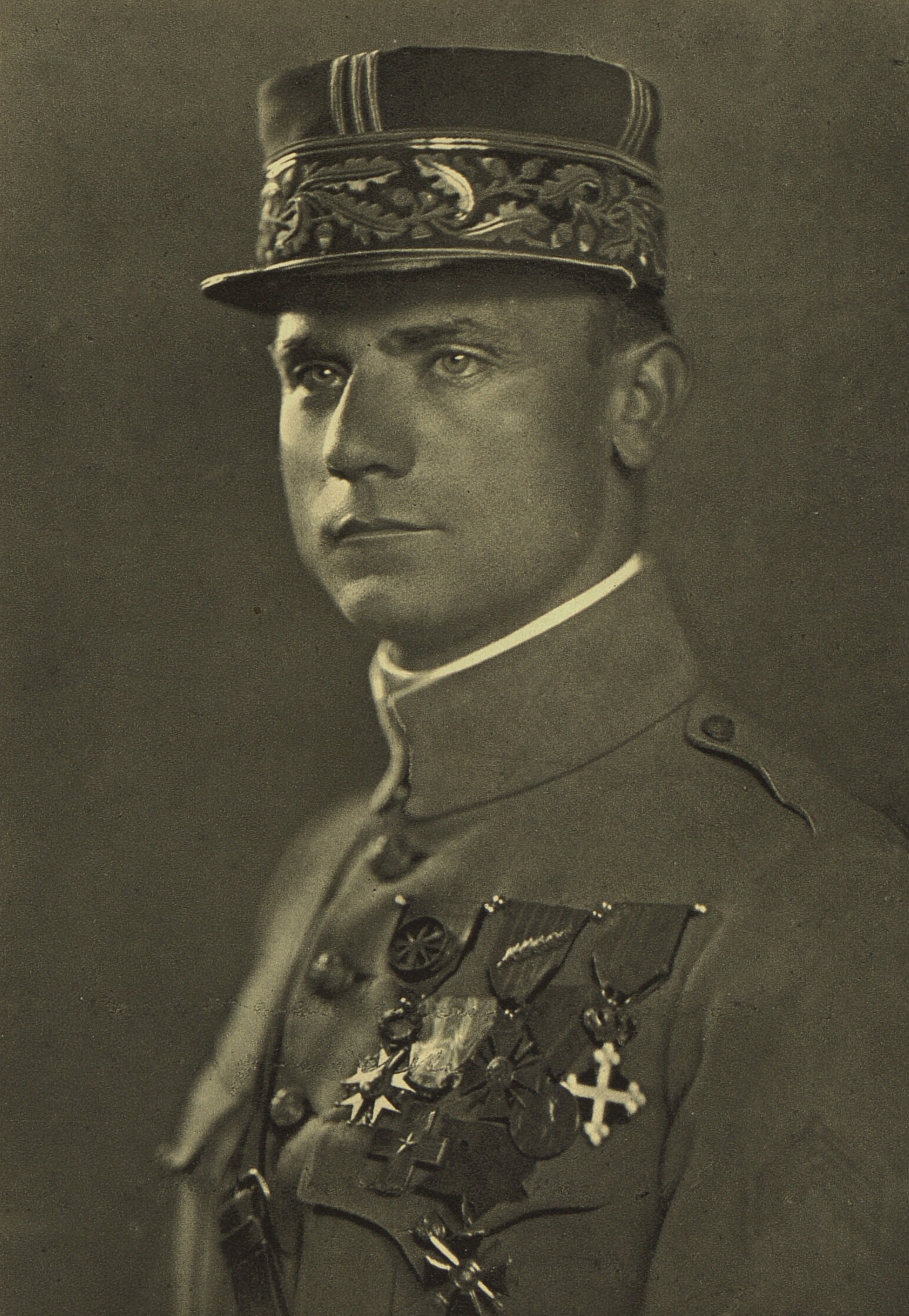
Milan Rastislav Štefánik

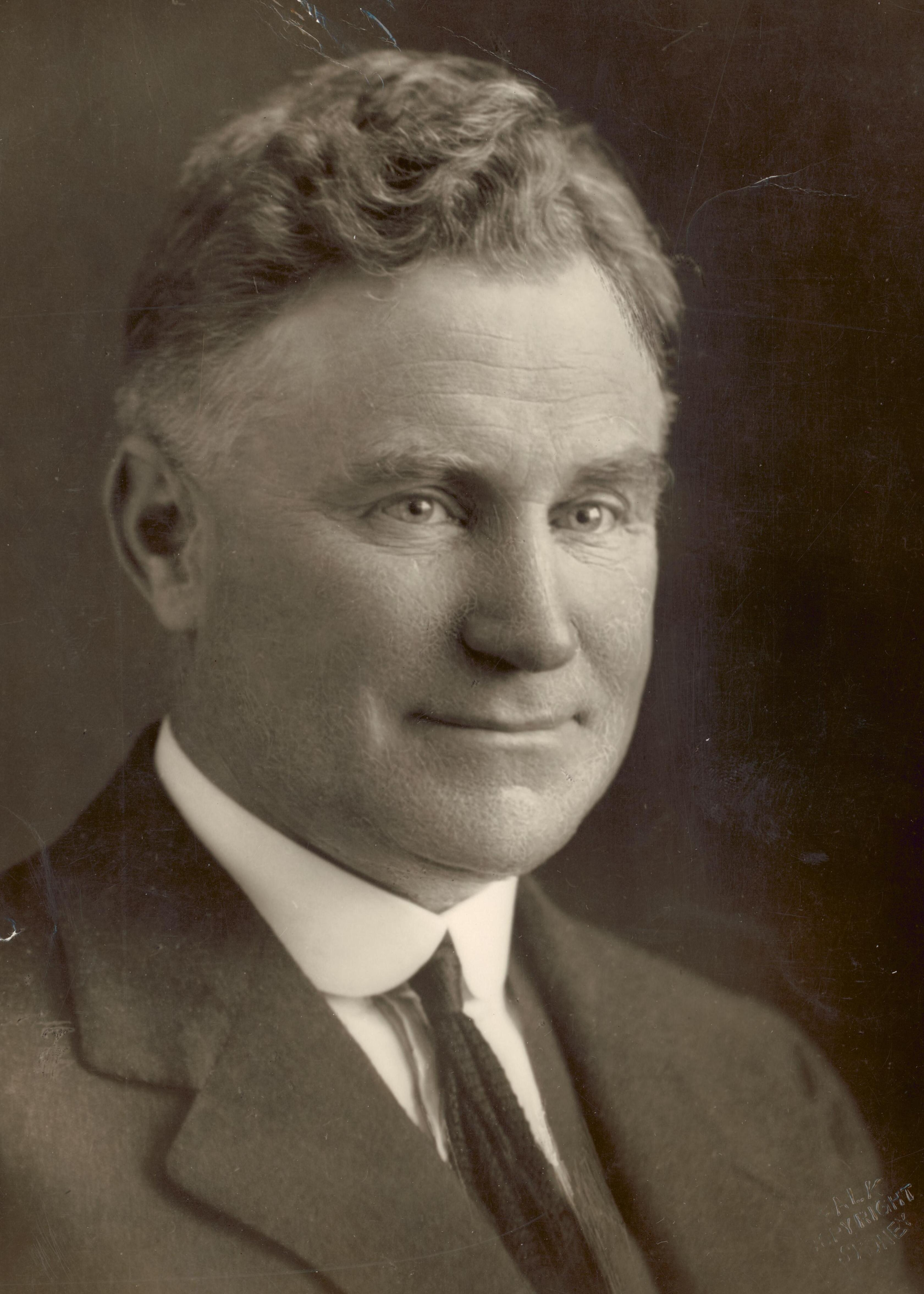
Sir Earle Page

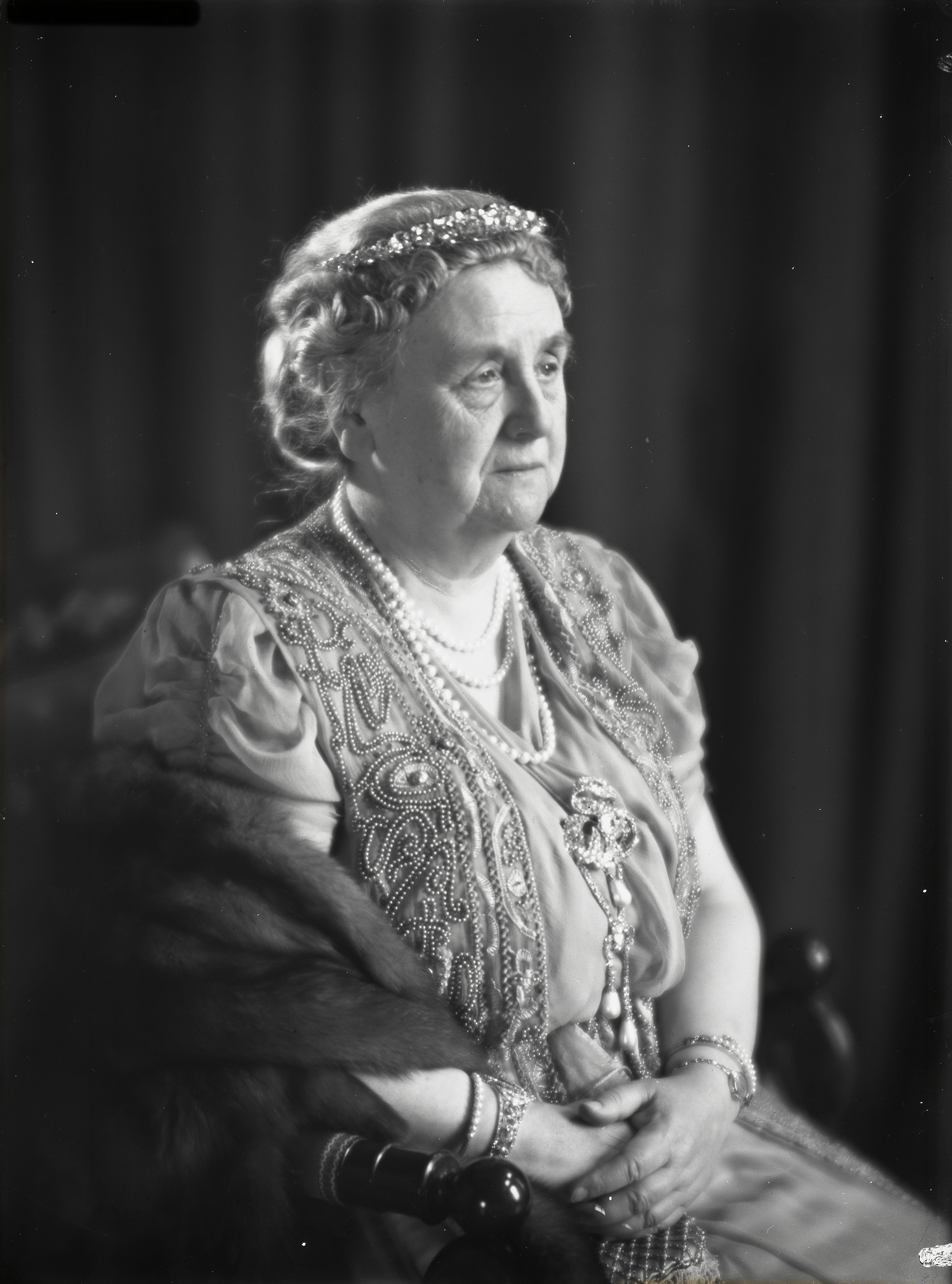
Queen Wilhelmina of the Netherlands

- July 5 – Jan Kubelík, Czech violinist (d. 1940)
- July 12 – Tod Browning, American motion picture director, horror film pioneer (d. 1962)
- July 15 – Alessandro Guidoni, Italian air force general (d. 1928)
- July 21 – Milan Rastislav Štefánik, Slovak general, politician and astronomer (d. 1919)
- July 24 – Ernest Bloch, Swiss-born American composer (d. 1959)
- July 28 – Volodymyr Vynnychenko, 1st Prime Minister of Ukraine (d. 1951)
- August 4 – Werner von Fritsch, German general (d. 1939)
- August 8 – Sir Earle Page, 11th Prime Minister of Australia (d. 1961)
- August 12 – Christy Mathewson, American baseball player (d.1925)
- August 19 – Jean Patou, French fashion designer (d. 1936)
- August 22 – George Herriman, American cartoonist (d. 1944)
- August 26 – Guillaume Apollinaire, French poet and dramatist (d. 1918)
- August 29 – Marie-Louise Meilleur, Canadian supercentenarian, oldest Canadian ever (d. 1998)
- August 30 – Nikolai Astrup, Norwegian painter (d. 1928)
- August 31 – Queen Wilhelmina of the Netherlands (d. 1962)

=== September–October ===
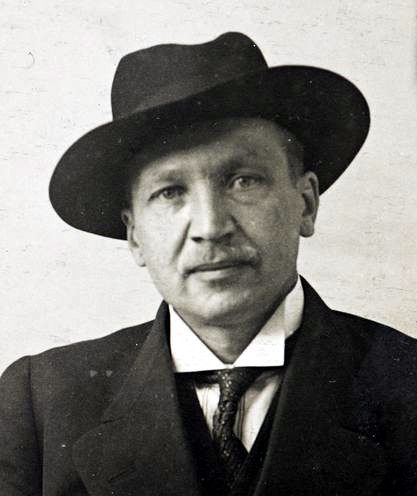
Kullervo Manner

- September 12 – H. L. Mencken, American journalist (d. 1956)
- September 14 – Archie Hahn, American athlete (d. 1955)
- September 15 – Chujiro Hayashi, Japanese Reiki master (d. 1940)
- September 16
  - Alfred Noyes, English poet (d. 1958)
  - Clara Ayres, American nurse (d. 1917)
- September 20 – Ugo Cavallero, Italian field marshal (d. 1943)
- September 22 – Christabel Pankhurst, English suffragette (d. 1958)
- September 23 – John Boyd Orr, Scottish physician and biologist, recipient of the Nobel Peace Prize (d. 1971)
- September 24 – Sarah Knauss, American supercentenarian, oldest American ever, last surviving person born in 1880 (d. 1999)
- September 27 – Pier Ruggero Piccio, Italian World War I fighter ace, air force general (d. 1965)
- September 29 – Liberato Pinto, 78th Prime Minister of Portugal (d. 1949)
- October 2 – Nicolae M. Condiescu, Romanian novelist and general (d. 1939)
- October 3 – Ganga Singh, Maharaja of Bikaner (d. 1943)
- October 4 – Damon Runyon, American writer (d. 1946)
- October 7 – Paul Hausser, German general (d. 1972)
- October 12
  - Marcel-Bruno Gensoul, French admiral (d. 1973)
  - Kullervo Manner, Finnish Speaker of the Parliament, the Prime Minister of the FSWR and the Supreme Commander of the Red Guards (d. 1939)
- October 17 – Ze'ev Jabotinsky, Russian Zionist philosopher, intellectual (d. 1940)
- October 23
  - Hong Yi, born Li Shutong, Chinese Buddhist artist, art teacher (d. 1942)
  - Una O'Connor, Irish actress (d. 1959)
- October 24 – Antonina De Angelis, Italian Roman Catholic religious professed and blessed (d. 1962)

=== November–December ===
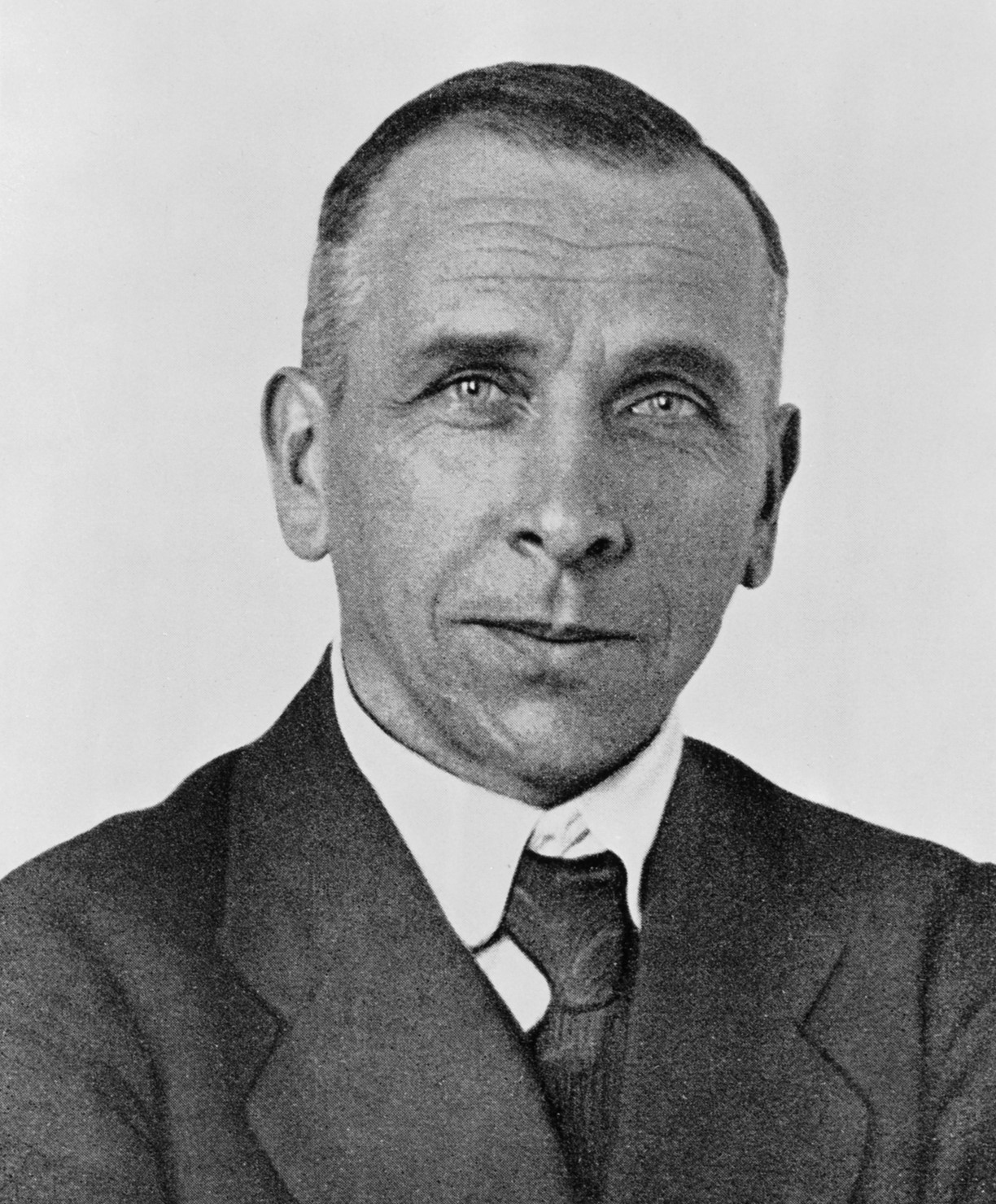
Alfred Wegener

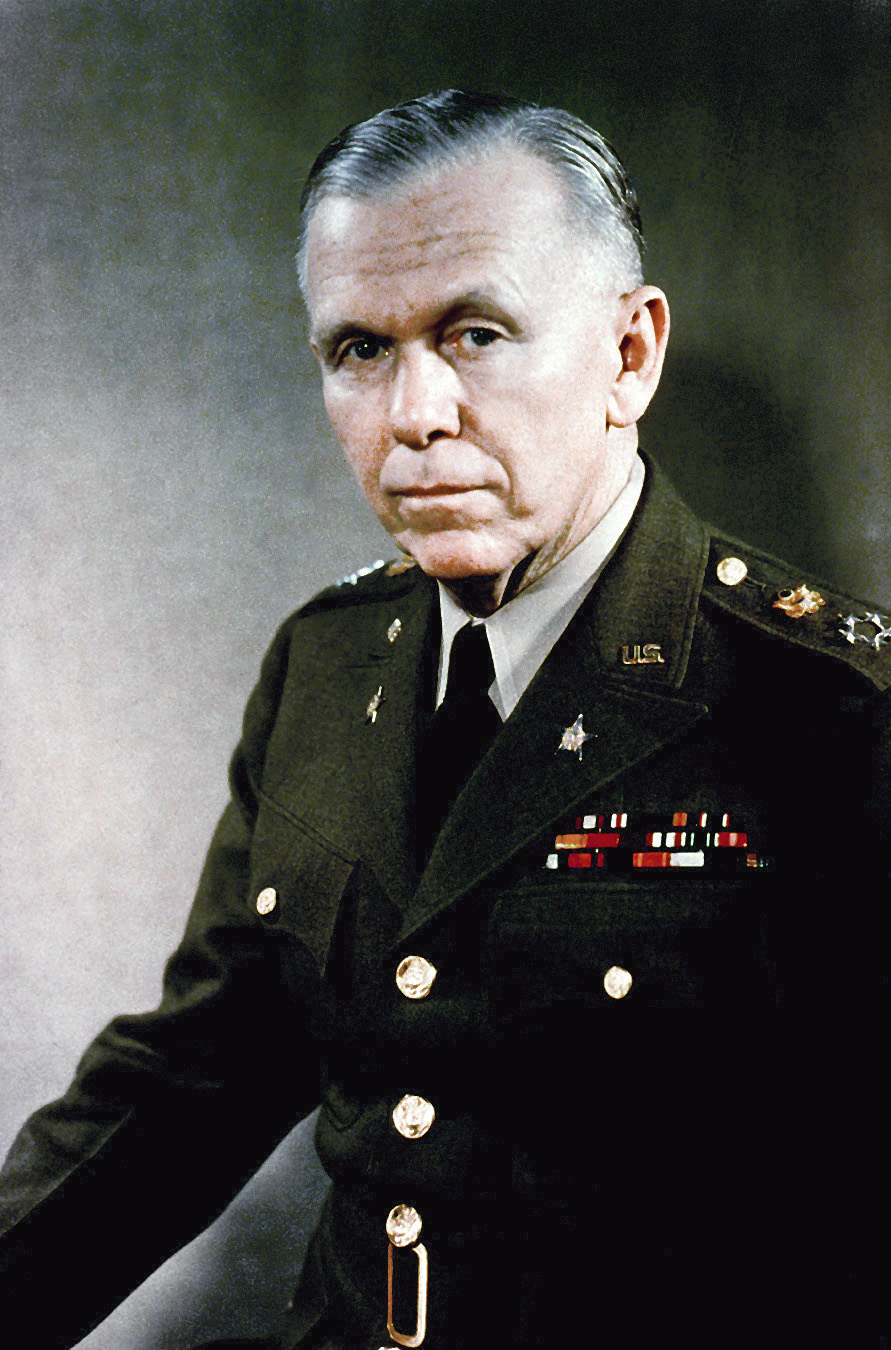
George Marshall

- November 1 – Alfred Wegener, German scientist, meteorologist (d. 1930)
- November 2 – John Foulds, English classical music composer (d. 1939)
- November 3 – Avra Theodoropoulou, Greek suffragist (d. 1963)
- November 5 – Richard Oswald, Austrian film director (d. 1963)
- November 6 – Robert Musil, Austrian novelist (d. 1942)
- November 9 – Giles Gilbert Scott, British architect (d. 1960)
- November 10 – Jacob Epstein, American-born sculptor (d. 1959)
- November 12 – Harold Rainsford Stark, American admiral (d. 1972)
- November 22
  - Charles Forbes, British admiral (d. 1960)
  - Pauline Ramart, French chemist and politician (d. 1953)
- November 25
  - John Flynn, Australian medical services pioneer (d. 1951)
  - Elsie J. Oxenham, English children's novelist (d. 1960)
- November 29 – Sara Allgood, Irish-American actress (d. 1950)
- December 1 – Joseph Trumpeldor, Russian Zionist (d. 1920)
- December 3 – Fedor von Bock, German field marshal (d. 1945)
- December 8 – Sin Ch'aeho, Korean independence activist (d. 1936)
- December 11 – Frank Tarrant, Australian cricketer (d. 1951)
- December 17 – Austin Hobart Clark, American zoologist (d. 1954)
- December 31 – George C. Marshall, United States Secretary of State, recipient of the Nobel Peace Prize (d. 1959)

== Deaths ==
=== January–June ===
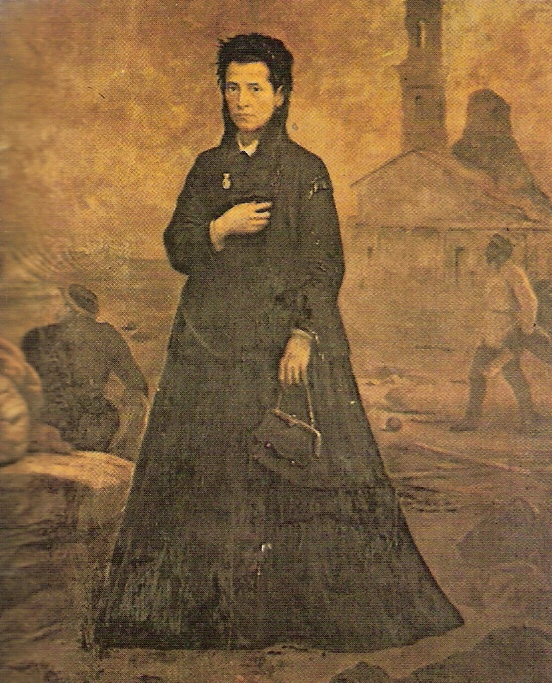
Ana Neri

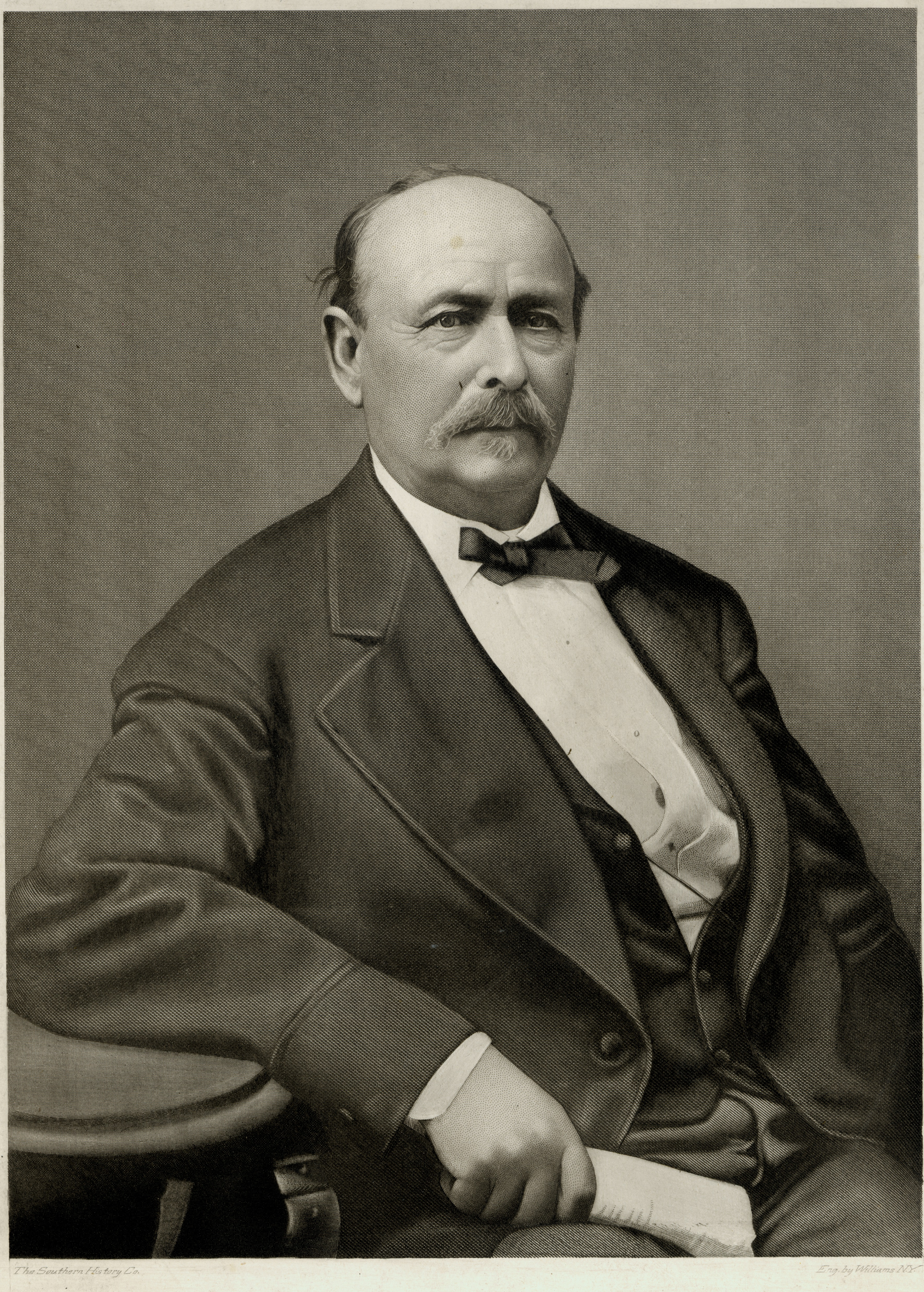
Eberhard Anheuser

- January 4
  - Anselm Feuerbach, German painter (b. 1829)
  - Marthe Camille Bachasson, Count of Montalivet, French statesman (b. 1801)
- January 8 – Joshua A. Norton, self-anointed Emperor Norton I of the United States of America (b. 1811)
- January 12 – Ellen Lewis Herndon Arthur, wife of Chester A. Arthur (b. 1837)
- January 14 – Frederick VIII of Schleswig-Holstein (b. 1829)
- January 20 – Captain Moonlite, Australian bushranger (hanged) (b. 1842)
- January 31 – Adolphe Granier de Cassagnac, French politician (b. 1806)
- February 18 – Nikolay Zinin, Russian organic chemist (b. 1812)
- February 29 – Sir James Milne Wilson, Premier of Tasmania (b. 1812)
- March 14 – Pagan Min, King of Ava (b. 1811)
- March 31 – Henryk Wieniawski, Polish composer (b. 1835)
- April 23 – Raden Saleh, Indonesian painter (b. 1807)
- April 27 – Joseph Vinoy, French general (b. 1803)
- May 2
- Eberhard Anheuser, German-American brewer, co-founder of Anheuser-Busch (b. 1806)
  - Eunice Hale Waite Cobb, American public speaker (b. 1803)
  - Tom Wills, Australian cricketer, pioneer of Australian rules football (b. 1835)
- May 4 – Edward Clark, Confederate Governor of Texas (b. 1815)
- May 8 – Gustave Flaubert, French novelist (b. 1821)
- May 20 – Ana Néri, Brazilian nurse (b. 1814)
- May 22 – Heinrich von Gagern, German statesman and politician (b. 1799)
- June 8 – Maria Alexandrovna (Marie of Hesse), Empress Consort of Czar Alexander II of Russia (b. 1824)
- June 28 – Texas Jack Omohundro, American frontier scout, actor, and cowboy (b. 1846)

=== July–December ===
Jacques Offenbach

- July 9 – Paul Broca, French physician and anthropologist (b. 1824)
- July 17 – Tomasz Chołodecki, Polish political activist (b. 1813)
- July 21 – Hiram Walden, American politician (b. 1800)
- August 9 – William Bigler, American politician (b. 1814)
- August 15 – Adelaide Neilson, English actress (b. 1848)
- August 16 – Herschel Vespasian Johnson, American politician (b. 1812)
- August 17 – Ole Bull, Norwegian violinist (b. 1810)
- August 24 – Chief Ouray, Native American leader (b. c. 1833)
- September 21 – Manuel Montt, 5th President of Chile (b. 1809)
- September 25 – John Tarleton, British admiral (b. 1811)
- October 5 – Jacques Offenbach, German-born French composer (b. 1819)
- October 14 – Victorio, Chiricahua Apache chief (b. c. 1825)
- October 22 – Alphonse Pénaud, French aviation pioneer (b. 1850)
- October 23 – Bettino Ricasoli, Italian statesman (b. 1809)
- November 11
  - Ned Kelly, Australian bush ranger (hanged) (b. c. 1855)
  - Lucretia Mott, American social activist (b. 1793)
- November 13 – August Karl von Goeben, Prussian general (b. 1816)
- November 23 – Sir Redmond Barry, Australian judge, sentenced Ned Kelly to death (b. 1813)
- November 28 – Aires de Ornelas e Vasconcelos, (Portuguese) Archbishop of Goa (b. 1837)
- November 30 – Jeanette Threlfall, English hymnwriter (b. 1821)
- December 7 – Maria Giuseppa Rossello, Italian Roman Catholic religious sister and blessed (b. 1811)
- December 20 – Gaspar Tochman, Polish-American soldier (b. 1797)
- December 22 – George Eliot, English writer (b. 1819)

=== Date unknown ===
- Manolache Costache Epureanu, 2-time prime minister of Romania (b. 1823)
- Ng Akew, Chinese businesswoman
