= Maria Ludovica De Angelis =

20th-century Italian Catholic religious sister and Blessed

Blessed Maria Ludovica de Angelis
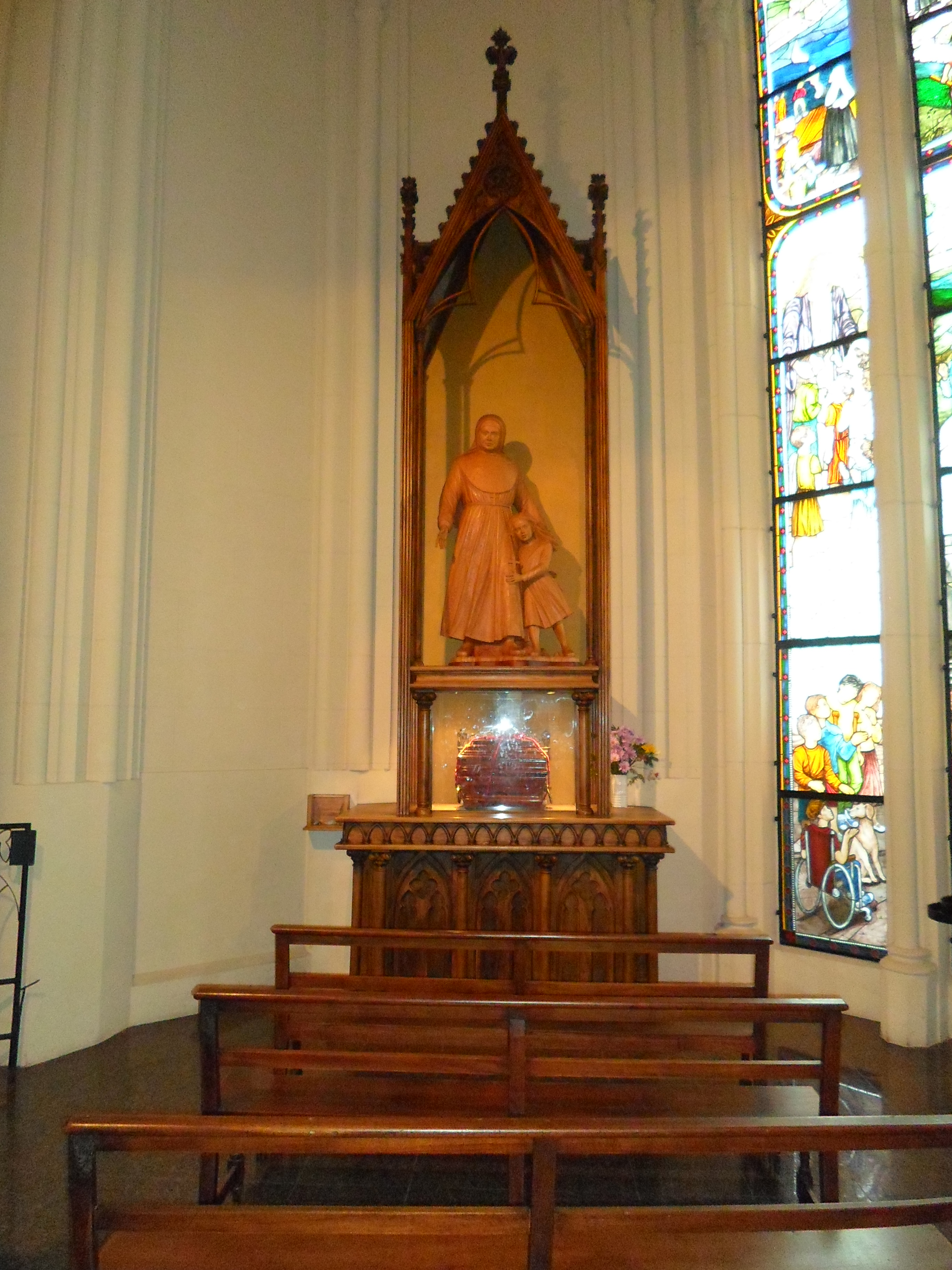
- The chapel to Maria Ludovica de Angelis in the Cathedral of La Plata, Argentina
- Born: Antonina De Angelis; 24 October 1880; San Gregorio, L'Aquila, Kingdom of Italy
- Died: 25 February 1962 (aged 81); La Plata, Gran La Plata, Argentina
- Venerated in: Roman Catholic Church
- Beatified: 3 October 2004, Saint Peter's Square by Pope John Paul II
- Canonized: 3 April 2005
- Feast: 25 February
- Attributes: Religious habit

Maria Ludovica De Angelis (born Antonina De Angelis, 24 October 1880 – 25 February 1962) was an Italian religious sister of the Daughters of Our Lady of Mercy, established by Maria Giuseppa Rossello. Upon investiture into the congregation, she assumed the religious name Maria Ludovica. She initially served in Italy, but moved to Argentina where she devoted her time to children and the children's hospital in La Plata. She died there in 1962. Pope John Paul II beatified her in 2004.

== Life ==
Antonina De Angelis was born in San Gregorio, Italy on 24 October 1880 as the first of eight children and was baptized on the date of her birth. As a child, De Angelis enjoyed nature and she worked daily in the fields near her home. Somewhat reserved, she decided to pursue a religious vocation. She entered the congregation of the Daughters of Our Lady of Mercy on 17 November 1904 and received the religious name Maria Ludovica.

On 14 November 1907, she left Italy for Buenos Aires, traveling by boat and arriving on 4 December. She was assigned in 1908 to work as the manager of the kitchen, linens and pantry for the children's hospital of La Plata (now known as Sor María Ludovica Hospital de Niños), When she arrived at the hospital, it had only 60 beds and two wooden chambers. De Angelis was later made the supervisor and head administrator of the children's hospital. She focused on expanding services for the children, securing funds to build additional patient and operating rooms, acquire medical equipment, and construct a convalescent center. She also was instrumental in the building of a chapel and creation of a farm to provide fresh produce for the children of the hospital. She was also instrumental in securing a grant from the Municipality of La Plata to maintain the hospital, which guaranteed its longevity. After her death, the city took over the administration of the facility.

De Angelis died in 1962 in La Plata.

== Beatification ==
Her beatification began when the current superior of the children's hospital, Emilia Paternosto, was told of "divine favor" some had received when praying to De Angelis. Paternosto motivated the beatification process in 1985, and the following year the Archbishop of La Plata, Antonio Quarracino, opened the case on the diocesan level, granting De Angelis the title of a Servant of God.

In 1992, after claims by a mother that her daughter with spina bifida was able to walk after intercession from De Angelis, a team of doctors examined the evidence and the Vatican concluded the healing was "scientifically inexplicable". In 2001, De Angelis was declared to have lived a life of heroic virtue and was granted the title of a Venerable by Pope John Paul II. On November 18, 2003, the Congregation for the Causes of Saints signed the authenticity of a miracle and John Paul II approved the findings the following month. He beatified De Angelis on 3 October 2004.

Claims of a second miraculous healing and investigation of the claim began in 2007.
