= Our Lady of Mercy Academy (New Jersey) =

Catholic high school in Gloucester County, New Jersey, United States

Location
- 1001 Main Road; Franklin Township, (Gloucester County), New Jersey 08344; United States
- 39°32′39″N 74°59′47″W

Information
- Type: Private, All-Girls
- Motto: Knowledge and Truth
- Religious affiliation: Roman Catholic
- Established: 1962
- Sister school: St. Augustine Preparatory School
- NCES School ID: A9104409
- Head of school: Brooke A. Coyle
- Faculty: 21.9 FTEs
- Grades: 9–12
- Enrollment: 220 (as of 2023–24)
- Student to teacher ratio: 10:1
- Campus: Suburban
- Campus size: 57 acres (230,000 m^{2})
- Colors: Green and gold
- Athletics conference: Cape-Atlantic League
- Team name: Villagers
- Accreditation: Middle States Association of Colleges and Schools
- Newspaper: The Oracle
- Tuition: $12,900 (for 2022-23)
- Website: www.olmanj.org

Our Lady of Mercy Academy (OLMA) is a college preparatory, all-girls Catholic high school founded in 1962 by the Daughters of Our Lady of Mercy in Franklin Township, Gloucester County, in the U.S. state of New Jersey. Despite its location in Franklin Township, the school has a Newfield mailing address. The school is accredited by the Middle States Association of Colleges and Schools Commissions on Elementary and Secondary Schools.

Operated under the auspices of the Roman Catholic Diocese of Camden, the first class, consisting of 23 students, graduated in June 1965. Its first principal was Sister M. Dolores. The first faculty members were Sisters Gertrude, Dominica, and Matthew Marie; now, most of the faculty is lay.

As of the 2023–24 school year, the school had an enrollment of 220 students and 21.9 classroom teachers (on an FTE basis), for a student–teacher ratio of 10:1. The school's student body was 82.7% (182) White, 5.9% (13) Hispanic, 5.5% (12) two or more races, 4.5% (10) Black and 1.4% (3) Asian.

OLMA is the only all-girls high school in South Jersey. The school grounds span 57 acres (23 ha) and include a gym, sports fields, a Chapel and an indoor pool. Its traditions include a senior trip to Florida, a religious retreat for all grades, junior Ring Mass and celebrations of Thanksgiving, Christmas, Three Kings Day, Mary Day, and Pi Day.

== Description ==
The school colors are green and gold; Green represents hope; gold represents victory. The school motto is "Knowledge and Truth". The school crest features a lamp for knowledge, a globe for truth, a cross for Christianity, an open book "of life" and an "M" for the Blessed Mother. The school is inspired by the vision of Saint Mary Joseph Rossello, who educated young girls in the 19th century. The school's community service club is named in her honor. OLMA is a sister school to St. Augustine College Preparatory School, the all-boys college prep school in Southern New Jersey, with which they share certain amenities such as busing and use of sports fields.

Each year, students, faculty, staff, family, friends, and alumni gather for the traditional Communion Breakfast, a Mass followed by a brunch. On October 2, 2011, this event kicked off OLMA's year-long 50th anniversary celebration, and featured as guest speaker Theresa Grentz of collegiate basketball fame.

== Athletics ==
The Our Lady of Mercy Academy Villagers compete in the National Division of the Cape-Atlantic League, an athletic conference comprising public and private high schools located in Atlantic, Cape May, Cumberland and Gloucester counties that operates under the supervision of the New Jersey State Interscholastic Athletic Association (NJSIAA). With 216 students in grades 10-12, the school was classified by the NJSIAA for the 2019–20 school year as Non-Public B for most athletic competition purposes, which included schools with an enrollment of 77 to 366 students in that grade range (equivalent to Group I for public schools).

OLMA sports include: crew, lacrosse, softball, swimming, basketball, track, cheerleading, winter track, cross country, tennis, volleyball, soccer and field hockey

The girls' outdoor track and field team won the Non-Public Group B state championship in 2009.
