= List of shipwrecks in March 1880 =

The list of shipwrecks in March 1880 includes ships sunk, foundered, grounded, or otherwise lost during March 1880.

== 1 March ==
List of shipwrecks: 1 March 1880
Ship	State	Description
Astronom	Germany	The steamship was damaged by an onboard explosion at Hamburg which killed one and injured three of her crew. She was on a voyage from Swansea, Glamorgan, United Kingdom to Hamburg.
Belsize	United Kingdom	The steamship ran aground at Avonmouth, Somerset.
Carrie	United Kingdom	The ship departed from Antigua for Harbour Grace, Newfoundland Colony. No further trace, reported overdue.
James	United Kingdom	The ship was driven ashore and wrecked at Whitehaven, Cumberland. Her crew were rescued.
Juno	United Kingdom	The schooner was driven ashore at Ostend, West Flanders, Belgium. She was on a voyage from Sunderland, County Durham to Bruges, West Flanders.
Lady Havelock	United Kingdom	The steamship was run into by the steamship G. E. Wood (United Kingdom) in the Bristol Channel and was beached.
Langley	United Kingdom	The steamship ran aground at Maassluis, South Holland, Netherlands and was beached. She was on a voyage from Sunderland to Rotterdam, South Holland.
Matilda Hilyard	Canada	The barque was wrecked on Horse Isle, in the Firth of Clyde. Her crew were rescued by the Ardrossan Lifeboat. She was on a voyage from Dunkirk, Nord, France to Ardrossan, Ayrshire, United Kingdom.
Ophelia	Denmark	The schooner was driven ashore and wrecked on Læsø. She was on a voyage from Sunderland to Thisted.
Paternita	Italy	The barque ran aground at Belfast, County Antrim, United Kingdom. She was on a voyage from Belfast to Glasgow, Renfrewshire, United Kingdom.
Ardrossan Lifeboat	Royal National Lifeboat Institution	The lifeboat capsized with the loss of four of the 25 people on board.

== 2 March ==
List of shipwrecks: 2 March 1880
Ship	State	Description
Maid of the Mill	United Kingdom	The Thames barge sank in the Thames Estuary off Shoeburyness, Essex. She was refloated.
Noely Leontine	France	The brigantine was run into by the steamship R. L. Alston (United Kingdom) and sank at Newport, Monmouthshire, United Kingdom.
Wear	United Kingdom	The steamship ran aground at Portsmouth, Hampshire. She was refloated.
Vandringsmanden	Norway	The ship was abandoned in the North Sea off Jutland with the loss of all but three of her crew. Survivors were rescued by the smack Amaranth (United Kingdom).

== 3 March ==
List of shipwrecks: 3 January 1880
Ship	State	Description
Anna Precht	United Kingdom	The ship ran aground in the River Torrens. She was on a voyage from Adelaide, South Australia to a British port. She was later refloated, and resumed her voyage on 7 March.
August	Germany	The ship was driven ashore at Danzig. She was on a voyage from Libava, Courland Governorate to Flensburg.
Cambronne	France	The barque was driven ashore at Littlehampton, Sussex, United Kingdom. She was on a voyage from Havre de Grâce, Seine-Inférieure to Cardiff, Glamorgan, United Kingdom.
Familien	Denmark	The schooner was driven ashore at the Rammekens Castle, Zeeland, Netherlands. She was on a voyage from Antwerp, Belgium to Leith, Lothian, United Kingdom.
Leo	United Kingdom	The steamship collided with the steamship Strauss (Germany) and sank in the River Thames at Cubitt Town, Middlesex. All on board were rescued. She was on a voyage from London to Gravesend, Kent.
Lizzie M. Merrill	United States	The ship foundered in the Atlantic Ocean with the loss of all but her captain. He was rescued on 6 March by Harald Haafar (Flag unknown). Lizzie M. Merill was on a voyage from New York to New Orleans, Louisiana.
Lutto	Netherlands	The ship was driven ashore at Harlingen, Friesland. Her crew were rescued by a pilot boat. She was on a voyage from Pensacola, Florida, United States to Harlingen. Lutto was refloated in mid-April and taken in to Harlingen in a severely damaged condition.
Mary	United Kingdom	The schooner collided with the schooner Sjomanden (Denmark) and was beached at the Rammekens Castle. Mary was on a voyage from Antwerp to Leith.
Pennsylvania	United States	The steamship ran aground on the Pluckington Bank, in Liverpool Bay. She was on a voyage from Liverpool, Lancashire, United Kingdom to Philadelphia, Pennsylvania. She was refloated with the assistance of a tug and resumed her voyage.
Pioneer	United Kingdom	The smack was driven ashore and wrecked on Burra, Shetland Islands. Her crew were rescued.
St. Charles	United States	The ship was destroyed by fire at Kobe, Japan. She was on a voyage from New York to Kobe.

== 4 March ==
List of shipwrecks: 4 March 1880
Ship	State	Description
Adam White	United Kingdom	The schooner was driven ashore at the Rammekens Castle, Zeeland, Netherlands. She was on a voyage from Antwerp, Belgium to Newport, Monmouthshire.
Athens	United Kingdom	The steamship ran aground in the Suez Canal. She was refloated the next day.
Auguste	Germany	The schooner was driven ashore at the Rammekens Castle. She was on a voyage from Ghent, East Flanders, Belgium to an English port.
Aurora	Portugal	The schooner was driven ashore and wrecked on Faial Island, Azores.
Baron Sloet	Netherlands	The steamship was driven ashore between Rambung and Surabaya, Netherlands East Indies. She was refloated and resumed her voyage.
Batavia	United Kingdom	The steamship ran aground at "Perin Island". She was refloated with assistance from Glennifer (United Kingdom), and resumed her voyage on 6 March.
Bayonnaise	France	The crewless brig was towed in to Guernsey, Channel Islands by the steamship Diana (United Kingdom).
Bertha Jane	United Kingdom	The Thames barge sank in the River Thames near Northfleet, Kent.
Edward P. Bouverie	United Kingdom	The barque struck a rock off Le Rozel, Manche, France and foundered with the loss of all hands.
Electra	United Kingdom	The steamship was driven ashore at Port Talbot, Glamorgan. She was on a voyage from Bilbao, Spain to Port Talbot.
Hannah Crosdell	United Kingdom	The ship ran aground on the Hoyle Bank, in Liverpool Bay. She was on a voyage from the River Duddon to Connah's Quay, Flintshire.
Mercator	Belgium	The ship was sighted off Vlissingen, Zeeland, Netherlands whilst on a voyage from Antwerp to New York, United States. Subsequently foundered with the loss of all on board, more than 60 lives.
West Stanley	United Kingdom	The steamship ran aground in the Dardanelles. She was on a voyage from South Shields, County Durham to Odesa, Russia. She was refloated, and resumed her voyage on 6 March.

== 5 March ==
List of shipwrecks: 5 March 1880
Ship	State	Description
Albyn	United Kingdom	The brigantine sprang a leak and foundered in the Atlantic Ocean 65 nautical miles (120 km) off São Vicente Island, Cape Verde Islands. Her six crew survived. She was on a voyage from Huelva, Spain to Rotterdam, South Holland, Netherlands.
Cumberland Lassie	United Kingdom	The schooner was driven ashore at Barry, Glamorgan. She was refloated with assistance from the tug Sarah Jane (United Kingdom) and resumed her voyage.
Ettrick	United Kingdom	The steamship collided with the steamship St. Petersburg (Flag unknown) and sank in the River Thames at Gravesend, Kent. Her crew survived. Ettrick was on a voyage from London to Gravelines, Manche, France. She had been refloated by 17 March and taken in tow for London.
Hannah	United Kingdom	The ship was beached at Falmouth, Cornwall. She was on a voyage from Bilbao, Spain to Port Talbot, Glamorgan.
Lucinda Jane	United Kingdom	The ship was driven ashore at Ayr. She was on a voyage from Larne, County Antrim to Ayr. She was refloated the next day with the assistance of a tug.
Nation	United Kingdom	The schooner foundered off Rathlin Island, County Antrim. Her crew survived.

== 6 March ==
List of shipwrecks: 6 March 1880
Ship	State	Description
Adella	United Kingdom	The steamship collided with the steamship Celsus and sank in the River Tees.
Unnamed	Flag unknown	A waterlogged vessel was reported by Giorgio Washington (Italy) in the Atlantic Ocean at 45°41′N 025°15′W.

== 7 March ==
List of shipwrecks: 7 March 1880
Ship	State	Description
Golconde	France	The ship departed from Cap-Haïtien, Haiti for Havre de Grâce, Seine-Inférieure. No further trace, reported overdue.
Napoleon, or Prince Napoleon	France	The ship departed from Cap-Haïtien for Havre de Grâce. No further trace, reported overdue.

== 8 March ==
List of shipwrecks: 8 March 1880
Ship	State	Description
Challenge	United States	The schooner sprung a leak and sank 5 nautical miles (9.3 km) south of Petit Manan Lighthouse, Maine. Her crew left in her boat landing 15 hours later on Baker's Island.
Devana	United Kingdom	The ship was sighted in the Atlantic Ocean whilst on a voyage from Bangkok, Siam for London via Saint Helena. No further trace, reported overdue.
Joseph Brown	United Kingdom	The ship departed from Sunderland, County Durham for East London, Cape Colony. No further trace,. reported missing.
Roma	Italy	The steamship was driven ashore at Lydden Spout, Kent, United Kingdom. She was refloated the next day and taken in to Dover, Kent.
Travancore	United Kingdom	The steamship was wrecked at Castro Bight, south of Otranto, Italy. All on board survived.
Zeeland	Belgium	The barque was abandoned in the Atlantic Ocean. All on board were rescued by Peru (United Kingdom). Zeeland was on a voyage from Antwerp to Philadelphia, Pennsylvania, United States.

== 9 March ==
List of shipwrecks: 9 March 1880
Ship	State	Description
Acadia	New Zealand	The schooner departed from Hawke's Bay for Auckland . No further trace, presumed foundered with the loss of all eight hands.
Amanda	United Kingdom	The steamship was driven ashore at St. Bees Head, Cumberland. She was on a voyage from Rio Marina, Italy to Workington, Cumberland.
Arrogante	France	The barque was wrecked in a cyclone on a reef off Nouméa, New Caledonia. Her crew were rescued.
Chevert	New South Wales	The barque was damaged in a cyclone. She put in to "Havannah", New Hebrides, where she was condemned.
Falken	Denmark	The schooner was driven ashore near Sæby.
Henry Brand	United Kingdom	The steam collier ran aground on the Hampstead Ledge, off Yarmouth, Isle of Wight. She was on a voyage from Southampton, Hampshire to Cardiff, Glamorgan. She was refloated and continued her voyage.
Lucy and Adelaide	Queensland	The ship was wrecked in a cyclone at "Havannah", New Hebrides.
Rokeby	United Kingdom	The steamship ran aground in the River Usk. She was on a voyage from Newport, Monmouthshire to Savona, Italy.
Signi	Denmark	The barque ran aground at Cardiff. She was refloated.
Stephanotis	United Kingdom	The steamship was driven ashore at Amager, Denmark. She was refloated with assistance and taken in to Copenhagen, Denmark for repairs.
Vincent	United Kingdom	The cutter was wrecked in a cyclone in the Loyalty Islands.

== 10 March ==
List of shipwrecks: 10 March 1880
Ship	State	Description
Dilharree	United Kingdom	The barque ran aground and was wrecked in the Columbia River, outward from Astoria, Oregon, United States for an English port. Her crew survived.
Due Fratelli	Italy	The barque was destroyed by fire at Buenos Aires, Argentina.
Energy	New Zealand	The cutter became a total loss after stranding on Whakaari / White Island in the Bay of Plenty during a gale.

== 11 March ==
List of shipwrecks: 11 March 1880
Ship	State	Description
B. Y. O.	United Kingdom	The barque was wrecked off the Dutch coast with the loss of four of her twelve crew. One on the survivors was rescued by the Emden Lifeboat. She was on a voyage from Hamburg, Germany to Puerto Rico.
Galeed	United Kingdom	The steamship departed from Gothenburg, Sweden for London. Subsequently foundered with the loss of all 30 crew. Wreckage including a nameboard was discovered in the Baltic Sea (55°40′N 7°58′E) on 26 April by the steamship Thames.
John Watt	United States	The ship was damaged by fire at New Orleans, Louisiana.
Marcia Greenleaf	United States	The ship was damaged by fire at New Orleans.
Martha J. Granger	United States	The schooner was driven ashore and was wrecked 1 nautical mile (1.9 km) north of Life Saving Station No. 12, 4th District, on the New Jersey coast. Her five crew were rescued by the United States Life Saving Service.
Vincenzo	Italy	The brigantine caught fire at sea. She was towed in to Pernambuco, Brazil by the steamship San Martin (France). Vincenzo was on a voyage from Montevideo, Uruguay to Havre de Grâce, Seine-Inférieure, France.
Wilhelmine	Germany	The schooner was driven ashore and wrecked in Mossel Bay. Her crew were rescued.

== 12 March ==
List of shipwrecks: 12 March 1880
Ship	State	Description
Agnes Ellen	United Kingdom	The ship struck the seawall at Seacombe, Cheshire and was damaged. She was consequently beached at Tranmere, Cheshire. She was on a voyage from Smyrna, Russia to Liverpool, Lancashire.
Duchess of Marlborough	United Kingdom	The steamship was driven ashore at Langness, Isle of Man. She was on a voyage from Dublin to Maryport, Cumberland. She was refloated and taken in to Castletown, Isle of Man.
John and Mary	United Kingdom	The brigantine was wrecked off Ballywalter, County Down. Her five crew were rescued by the Ballywalter Lifeboat.
Livingstone	Canada	The full-rigged ship was driven ashore at Dungeness, Kent, United Kingdom. She was on a voyage from Bremen, Germany to Philadelphia, Pennsylvania, United States.
M. Luisa	Flag unknown	The ship was sighted off Fortress Monroe, Virginia, United States whilst on a voyage from Baltimore, Maryland, United States to a British port. No further trace, reported missing.
Perthshire	United Kingdom	The barque was driven ashore at Dreswick Point, Isle of Man. Her crew were rescued. She was on a voyage from Calais, France to Glasgow, Renfrewshire. She was refloated in late March and towed in to Greenock, Renfrewshire.
Ramsey	(United Kingdom of Great Britain and Ireland) Isle of Man	The lugger was run down and sunk off the Conyngsbeg Lightship ( Trinity House) by the steamship Brooklyn (United Kingdom) with the loss of two of her seven crew.
Selina	United Kingdom	The brig foundered in the Atlantic Ocean. Her eight crew survived. She was on a voyage from Puerto Cabello, Venezuela to Swansea, Glamorgan.
Serug	Austria-Hungary	The barque departed from New York, United States for Queenstown, County Cork, United Kingdom. No further trace, reported overdue.
Triumph	United Kingdom	The schooner was driven ashore and wrecked at Langness. Her three crew survived. She was on a voyage from Chester, Cheshire to Belfast, County Antrim.
Vine	United Kingdom	The steamship ran aground at Ballina, County Mayo. She was on a voyage from Ballina to Glasgow, Renfrewshire. She was refloated on 14 March and resumed her voyage.
William Hunter	United Kingdom	The steamship was driven ashore at Dungeness.

== 13 March ==
List of shipwrecks: 13 March 1880
Ship	State	Description
Baltic	Norway	The schooner sprang a leak and was abandoned 130 nautical miles (240 km) off the Norwegian coast. Her crew were rescued by the smack Victor (United Kingdom). Baltic was on a voyage from Porsgrund to Bo'ness, Lothian, United Kingdom.
Beauty	United Kingdom	The smack was wrecked off Clonakilty, County Cork.
Columba	France	The steamship suffered a boiler explosion and was driven ashore at Bône, Algeria. Two of her crew were killed and one was so severely injured that it was thought he would not survive.
Donna Sophia	United Kingdom	The ship was damaged at her berth at Troon, Ayrshire and became severely leaky. She was on a voyage from Irvine, Ayrshire to Saint=Malo, Ille-et-Vilaine, France.
Haydn	United Kingdom	The steamship collided with the steamship Crescent (United Kingdom) and sank in the North Sea 20 nautical miles (37 km) off Spurn Point, Yorkshire. Her crew were rescued. Haydn was on her maiden voyage, from Newcastle upon Tyne Northumberland to Port Said, Egypt.
Mabel	United Kingdom	The steamship ran aground on the Goodwin Sands, Kent. She was on a voyage from Rio de Janeiro, Brazil to Middlesbrough, Yorkshire. Mabel was refloated on 16 March with assistance from the tugs India, Sussex, Victor and Wanderer (all United Kingdom). She was towed in to Gravesend, Kent by India.
Musgrave	United Kingdom	The steamship was driven ashore on Inchcolm, Fife and sank. Her eleven crew survived. She was on a voyage from Middlesbrough, Yorkshire to Grangemouth, Stirlingshire.
Nantes	France	The steamship ran aground at Smyrna, Russia. She was on a voyage from Smyrna to Liverpool, Lancashire.
Star of the West	United Kingdom	The ship was abandoned in the Atlantic Ocean. Her twelve crew were rescued by the barque Alfen (Norway). Star of the West was on a voyage from New York, United States to Dublin.
Two unnamed vessels	Spain	The feluccas were crushed by the steamship Columba (France) at Bône, severely injuring 25 people.

== 14 March ==
List of shipwrecks: 14 March 1880
Ship	State	Description
Aden	United Kingdom	The steamship was run into by the steamship Crescent (United Kingdom) and sank off the mouth of the Humber.
Ebro	United Kingdom	The steamship was driven ashore at Runton, Norfolk. She was on a voyage from Middlesbrough, Yorkshire to Bilbao, Spain. She was refloated and resumed her voyage.
George L. Lamont	United States	The steamship capsized with the loss of three lives.
Governor Tilley	United Kingdom	The full-rigged ship ran aground on the Joe Flogger Sandbank, at the mouth of the Schuylkill River. She was on a voyage from New York, United States to Philadelphia, Pennsylvania, United States. She was refloated on 17 March and taken in to Philadelphia.
Montana	United Kingdom	The steamship was wrecked at Church Bay, Anglesey. All on board were rescued, some by the tug Sea King (United Kingdom). Montana was on a voyage from New York, United States to Liverpool, Lancashire. She was refloated on 9 April and taken in to Liverpool. Subsequently scrapped.
No Name	United Kingdom	The brig sprang a leak and sank in the Atlantic Ocean. Her nine crew were rescued by the barque Norna (Germany) and by Sorane (Denmark). No Name was on a voyage from Lagos, Lagos Colony to Rotterdam, South Holland, Netherlands.
Robert	United Kingdom	The brig foundered in the North Sea. Her crew were rescued by the smack Foxhound (United Kingdom) . She was on a voyage from Hull, Yorkshire to Copenhagen, Denmark.

== 15 March ==
List of shipwrecks: 15 March 1880
Ship	State	Description
Alfred Eulalie	France	The ship was driven ashore near Goulven, Finistère. Her crew were rescued. She was on a voyage from Middlesbrough, Yorkshire, United Kingdom to L'Orient, Morbihan.
RMS City of Sydney	United Kingdom	The steamship caught fire at San Francisco, California, United States. She was on a voyage from Auckland, New Zealand to San Francisco. The fire was extinguished.
Gannet	United Kingdom	The steamship ran aground at Blankenese, Germany. She was on a voyage from Hamburg, Germany to London. She was refloated and put back to Hamburg in a leaky condition.
Zephyr	Netherlands	The ship foundered in the English Channel south west of the Isle of Wight, United Kingdom. Her crew were rescued by Britannia (United Kingdom).

== 16 March ==
List of shipwrecks: 16 March 1880
Ship	State	Description
City of Rochester	United Kingdom	The steamship ran aground at Sunderland, County Durham. She was refloated and taken in to Sunderland.
Euxine	France	The steamship ran aground at Bukari Point, Greece. She was refloated and resumed taken in to Patras, Greece.
Five Sisters	United States	The schooner was driven ashore and wrecked 500 yards (460 m) north of Life Saving Station No. 13, 4th District, 200 yards (180 m) off the New Jersey coast. Her six crew were rescued by the United States Life Saving Service.
Foreningen	Norway	The barque ran aground off Saltholmen, Denmark. She was on a voyage from Alloa, Clackmannanshire to klaipėda, Germany. She was refloated with assistance and resumed her voyage.
Maude	United Kingdom	The steamship struck rocks off Ouessant, Finistère, France and was wrecked. Her crew survived. She was on a voyage from Huelva, Spain to Hull, Yorkshire.
Rontegui	France	The steamship ran aground on rocks off the north coast of Guernsey, Channel Islands and sank. Her crew were rescued. She was on a voyage from Dunkirk, Nord to Oran, Algeria, or vice versa.
Tropic	Haiti	The brig was driven ashore and wrecked 1 nautical mile (1.9 km) north of Life Saving Station No. 21, 4th District, on the New Jersey coast. Her seven crew were rescued by the United States Life Saving Service.
Unnmaed	Flag unknown	The steamship ran aground on the East Hoyle Bank, in Liverpool Bay.

== 17 March ==
List of shipwrecks: 17 March 1880
Ship	State	Description
Maude	United Kingdom	The steamship ran aground off Ouessant, Finistère, France. She was on a voyage from Huelva, Spain to Hull, Yorkshire.
Sally Ann	United Kingdom	The schooner was driven ashore and wrecked at Annalong, County Down. Her crew were rescued.
Salvatore	France	The brig was driven ashore at Camber, Sussex, United Kingdom.
Sarah and Ellen	Canada	The barque was driven onto shoals off Hog Island, Virginia, United States, near the entrance to Great Machapongo Inlet and 1 nautical mile (1.9 km) north of Life Saving Station No. 9, 5th District. An attempt to be pulled off by a tug on 19 March failed. Her fourteen crew, plus locals hired by the wrecking company were rescued by the United States Life Saving Service and the wrecking company tug. She was stripped and abandoned on 20 March.
Surinam	Netherlands	The barque ran aground on the Goodwin Sands, Kent, United Kingdom. She was on a voyage from Amsterdam, North Holland to Surinam. She was refloated with assistance from a tug and the Ramsgate Lifeboat and taken in to The Downs, and then Dover, Kent.
Zoe	France	The schooner sank at Carrickfergus, County Antrim, United Kingdom. Her crew survived.

== 18 March ==
List of shipwrecks: 18 March 1880
Ship	State	Description
Achorn	United States	The schooner was sunk in a collision with schooner Maria and Elizabeth (United States) 9 nautical miles (17 km) off Absecon, New Jersey with the loss of one of her four crew. Survivors reached the Hereford Inlet in their boat.
Anne Margaretha	Denmark	The ship was discovered abandoned in the Thames Estuary. She was taken in to London, United Kingdom.
Britannia	Germany	The steamship ran aground at Antwerp, Belgium and broke her back.
Catherine	United Kingdom	The brigantine ran aground on the Souyn Sands, in the Bristol Channel and was wrecked. She was on a voyage from Fécamp, Seine-Inférieure to Llanelly, Glamorgan.
Fage Sylvan	Norway	The ship ran aground at Pauillac, Gironde, France. She was on a voyage from Libava, Courland Governorate to Bordeaux, Gironde.
Ferzo	Austria-Hungary	The brig was driven ashore at Aboukir, Egypt. She was on a voyage from Trieste to Alexandria, Egypt.
Gustaf	(Russian Empire) Grand Duchy of Finland	The barque was wrecked at "Punta Enjans".
Hercon	Norway	The brig ran aground on the Goodwin Sands, Kent, United Kingdom.
Louisa	United Kingdom	The brigantine ran aground on the Haisborough Sands, in the North Sea off the coast of Norfolk. She was refloated and assisted in to Great Yarmouth, Norfolk by a tug.
Oskar	Denmark	The barque ran aground at Penzance, Cornwall, United Kingdom and was then run into by Christabel (United Kingdom). Oskar was on a voyage from Skien to Penzance.
Swiftsure	United Kingdom	The ship ran aground at Ergasteria, Ottoman Empire. She was refloated.

== 19 March ==
List of shipwrecks: 19 March 1880
Ship	State	Description
Dapueto Padre	Italy	The barque ran aground at Cardiff, Glamorgan, United Kingdom. She was on a voyage from Cardiff to the Cape Verde Islands.
Mary A. Myshrall	Canada	The ship was abandoned in the Atlantic Ocean. Her crew were rescued by the steamship Parthia (United Kingdom), which put a volunteer crew aboard and took Mary A. Myshrall in tow. The tow had to be abandoned on 21 March and the volunteer crew were retrieved. She was on a voyage from Middlesbrough, Yorkshire to Baltimore, Maryland, United States.
Sarah Ellen	United Kingdom	The barque was lost off Cape Charles, Virginia, United States. She was on a voyage from New York to Baltimore.
Vincenzo	Flag unknown	The ship put in to Pernambuco, Brazil on fire and was beached. She was on a voyage from Montevideo, Uruguay to Havre de Grâce, Seine-Inférieure, France.
Water Witch	United Kingdom	The ship sprang a leak and foundered 9 nautical miles (17 km) off Campbeltown, Argyllshire. Her crew were rescued. She was on a voyage from Belfast, County Antrim to Campbeltown.
Unnamed	Flag unknown	The ship was wrecked at Rossitten, Germany with the loss of at least five lives.

== 20 March ==
List of shipwrecks: 20 March 1880
Ship	State	Description
Cleanthes	United Kingdom	The steamship ran aground 4 nautical miles (7.4 km) north of Scarborough, Yorkshire. She was on a voyage from Hamburg, Germany to Sunderland, County Durham. She was refloated and resumed her voyage.
Dorset, Elf, and Par	United Kingdom	The tug Elf was towing Dorset and Par in the Bristol Channel when all three vessels ran aground, with Dorset colliding with Par.
Livadia	United Kingdom	The steamship ran aground in the River Usk. She was on a voyage from Elba, Italy to Newport, Monmouthshire.
Queen of Hearts	United Kingdom	The ship was abandoned in the Atlantic Ocean with the loss of five of her fifteen crew. Survivors were rescued by Shannon (United Kingdom). Queen of Hearts was on a voyage from Mobile, Alabama, United States to Belfast, County Antrim.
Victor	Norway	The barque was abandoned in the Atlantic Ocean. Her twelve crew took to a boat; they were rescued on 24 March by the barque Rapid ( (Russian Empire) Grand Duchy of Finland). Victor was on a voyage from Philadelphia, Pennsylvania, United States to Queenstown, County Cork, United Kingdom.
Unnamed	United Kingdom	The steamship ran aground at Belfast, County Antrim. She was on a voyage from Fleetwood, Lancashire to Belfast.

== 21 March ==
List of shipwrecks: 21 March 1880
Ship	State	Description
Eclipse	United Kingdom	The barque ran aground on the Pull Reef. She was on a voyage from Hartlepool, County Durham to Flensburg, Germany. She was refloated.
Lizzie	United Kingdom	The ship was beached at Newlyn, Cornwall. She was on a voyage from Cardiff, Glamorgan to Par, Cornwall.
Northern Empire	United Kingdom	The ship foundered in the Atlantic Ocean. Her 22 crew took to two boats. Eight crew in one of the boats were rescued by the barque Sara (Norway). Fourteen crew in the other boat were reported missing. Northern Empire was on a voyage from New Orleans to Liverpool, Lancashire.
Ophir	Canada	The barque was abandoned in the Atlantic Ocean (41°14′N 56°15′W). Her eleven crew took to a boat. They were rescued on 23 March by the steamship Neckar (Germany). Ophir was on a voyage from Philadelphia, Pennsylvania, United States to Newry, County Antrim.
Rosannah Rose	New Zealand	The schooner went ashore and was wrecked north of Kaikōura. All seven people on board survived.

== 22 March ==
List of shipwrecks: 22 March 1880
Ship	State	Description
C. Bang	Norway	The brig was abandoned in the Atlantic Ocean. Her crew were rescued by the barque Atlas (Norway). C. Bang was on a voyage from Belize City, British Honduras to Liverpool, Lancashire, United Kingdom.
Isabella Mott	United States	The ship was abandoned in the Atlantic Ocean (42°04′N 47°58′W). Her crew were rescued by the barque Ragna (Norway). Isabella Mott was on a voyage from New York to Antwerp, Belgium.
Pauline	Germany	The barque ran aground at Wilmington, Delaware, United States and sprang a leak. She was on a voyage from Wilmington to Stettin.
Reform	Norway	The barque was driven ashore at Galveston, Texas, United States. She was on a voyage from Galveston to Cork.
Stornoway	United Kingdom	The full-rigged ship was abandoned 100 nautical miles (190 km) off the coast of the Newfoundland Colony. Her 27 crew were rescued by the barque W. J. Stiers Canada). Stornoway was on a voyage from New Orleans, Louisiana, United States to Liverpool, Lancashire.
Tokatea	New South Wales	The ship was wrecked at San Francisco, California, United States. Her crew were rescued.

== 23 March ==
List of shipwrecks: 23 March 1880
Ship	State	Description
Annie C. Norwood	United States	The fishing schooner was lost on Cashes Shoal with the loss of all 14 crew.
Ban Righ	United Kingdom	The schooner ran aground on the Lapp Sand. She was on a voyage from South Shields, County Durham to Königsberg, Germany. She was refloated and resumed her voyage.
Matthew Caw	United Kingdom	The steamship ran aground at Alexandria, Egypt. She was on a voyage from Alexandria to Hull, Yorkshire. She was refloated and resumed her voyage.
Unnamed	Flag unknown	The ship sank at the north end of Fair Isle, United Kingdom with the loss of all hands.

== 24 March ==
List of shipwrecks: 24 March 1880
Ship	State	Description
Aagot	Norway	The schooner was abandoned in the North Sea. Her five crew were rescued by the fishing smack Boldero (United Kingdom). Aagot was on a voyage from Norway to Newcastle upon Tyne, Northumberland, United Kingdom.
Almatea	United Kingdom	The ship was driven ashore at Shanghai, China.
Eugenio	United States	The barque was abandoned in the Atlantic Ocean. Her crew were rescued by the brig Handel (France). Eugenio was on a voyage from Baltimore, Maryland to Gibraltar.
Jean Paul	United Kingdom	The ship was wrecked 40 nautical miles (74 km) from Memel, Germany with the loss of all hands. She was on a voyage from Memel to the River Tyne.
Robert Wendt	Germany	The ship was abandoned in the Atlantic Ocean. Her crew were rescued by Maggie Miller ( Canada. Robert Wendt was on a voyage from New York to Stettin.
Secret	United Kingdom	The ship departed from West Hartlepool, County Durham for Danzig, Germany. No further trace, reported missing.

== 25 March ==
List of shipwrecks: 25 March 1880
Ship	State	Description
Abyssinia, or Assyria	United Kingdom	The steamship caught fire whilst on a voyage from Aden, Aden Province to Zanzibar. She put back to Aden and was scuttled.

== 26 March ==
List of shipwrecks: 26 March 1880
Ship	State	Description
Canadian	United Kingdom	The steamship sprang a leak and foundered off Donna Nook, Lincolnshire. Her crew were rescued by the tug Monarch (United Kingdom). Canadian was on a voyage from Dungeness, Kent to Hull, Yorkshire.
Dowlais	United Kingdom	The steamship hit the Rundlestone, Cornwall and sank with the loss of two of the nineteen people on board. Survivors took to the lifeboats. They were rescued by the steamship Sedgemoor (United Kingdom. Dowlais was on a voyage from Bilbao, Spain to Cardiff, Glamorgan.
Fernville	United Kingdom	The steamship collided with an iceberg and consequently sank the next day. Some of her crew were rescued by the barque Alliance France). Twenty-two crew were rescued on 29 March by Sarmatian (France). Fernville was on a voyage from Hartlepool, County Durham to Boston, Massachusetts, United States.
Kosmopoliet	Netherlands	The galiot foundered in the Atlantic Ocean (49°17′N 007°31′W). Her crew were rescued by the barque Vesta (Germany). Kosmopoliet was on a voyage from Ferrol, Spain, to Newcastle upon Tyne, Northumberland, United Kingdom.
Ocean Belle	United States	The fishing schooner sprang a leak and sank on the Georges Bank. Her crew were rescued.

== 27 March ==
List of shipwrecks: 27 March 1880
Ship	State	Description
Alicia	United Kingdom	The ship struck the Deputy Reef, off Donaghadee, County Down. She was on a voyage from Portrush, County Antrim to Newport, Monmouthshire. She put in to Belfast, County Antrim.
Amelia	United Kingdom	The steamship was wrecked on the Malabar Coast. Her crew survived.
Blue Jacket	United Kingdom	The smack struck a rock at Ballynass, County Londonderry and was damaged. She was on a voyage from Belfast to Ballynass.
Cid	Spain	The ship ran aground on the West Bank. She was on a voyage from New York to Havana, Cuba. She was refloated with assistance, and resumed her voyage the next day.
Dowlais	United Kingdom	The steamship struck rocks at Land's End, Cornwall and was wrecked with the loss of two of her nineteen crew. She was on a voyage from Bilbao, Spain to Cardiff, Glamorgan.
Elphinstone	United Kingdom	The steamship ran aground at Gibraltar. She was on a voyage from Rio Marina, Italy to Newcastle upon Tyne, Northumberland. She was refloated.
Foolscar	United States	The ship ran aground in the Schuylkill River. She was on a voyage from Philadelphia, Pennsylvania to Bremen, Germany.
Harp	United States	The boat was lost on Green Island, Maine. Her crew were rescued.
Hart	(United Kingdom of Great Britain and Ireland) Isle of Man	The schooner ran aground at Douglas Head. She was on a voyage from Douglas to Dublin. She was refloated and put back to Douglas in a severely leaky condition.
Jane Macred	United Kingdom	The schooner ran aground in Lough Swilly. She was refloated and taken in to Buncrana, County Donegal.
Janet Johnstone	United Kingdom	The ship sprang a leak and was beached at Glenarm, County Antrim. She was on a voyage from Belfast to Tralee, County Kerry.
Louisa Theresa	France	The brig was driven ashore at Le Verdon-sur-Mer, Gironde. She was refloated with the assistance of a tug.
Nenuphar	United Kingdom	The ship was abandoned in the Atlantic Ocean. Her crew were rescued by Washington (United States). Nenuphan was on a voyage from Baltimore, Maryland, United States to Londonderry.
Sophie	Germany	The galiot was run down and sunk in the Baltic Sea by the steamship Dalton (United Kingdom). All on board were rescued.
Sweet Home	United Kingdom	The schooner ran aground on the Cross Sand, in the North Sea of the coast of Norfolk. She was on a voyage from Newcastle upon Tyne to Figueira da Foz, Portugal. She was refloated and put in to Dover, Kent in a leaky condition.
Velarde	Spain	The steamship ran aground at Maassluis, South Holland, Netherlands. She was on a voyage from Lisbon, Portugal to Rotterdam, South Holland.
Young Alonzo	United Kingdom	The fishing boat collided with the schooner Rosalie (United Kingdom) and sank in Plymouth Sound. Her nine crew were rescued by Rosalie.

== 28 March ==
List of shipwrecks: 28 March 1880
Ship	State	Description
Arbutus	United Kingdom	The steamship was driven ashore and damaged. She was on a voyage from Ardrossan, Ayrshire to Dublin. She was refloated and completed her voyage in a severely leaky condition.
Betsey	United Kingdom	The ship departed from the River Tyne for Norrköping, Sweden. No further trace, reported missing.
Hero	United Kingdom	The ship foundered in the English Channel off the Owers Lightship ( Trinity House ). Her five crew were rescued by Elizabeth Young (United Kingdom).
Zicaro	United States	The schooner was driven ashore and wrecked 2 nautical miles (3.7 km) north of Life Saving Station No. 3, 2nd District on the coast of Massachusetts. Her crew landed on shore using a rope.

== 29 March ==
List of shipwrecks: 29 March 1880
Ship	State	Description
Cerwyn	United Kingdom	The steamship was wrecked on the Île de Sein, Finistère, France with the loss of ten of her twelve crew. She was on a voyage from Bilbao, Spain to Newport, Monmouthshire.
Equinox	United Kingdom	The ship departed from West Hartlepool, County Durham for Malmö, Sweden. No further trace, reported hopelessly overdue.
Strathairly	United Kingdom	The steamship ran aground in the Schuylkill River. She was on a voyage from Barrow-in-Furness, Lancashire to Philadelphia, Pennsylvania, United States. She was refloated.

== 30 March ==
List of shipwrecks: 30 March 1880
Ship	State	Description
Ayres	United Kingdom	The steam yacht was wrecked 3 nautical miles (5.6 km) south of the South Stack, Anglesey. Her crew were rescued.
Carnham	United Kingdom	The steamship ran aground on Raasay. Her crew were rescued.
Emperor	United Kingdom	The schooner ran aground in the Strangford Lough. She was on a voyage from Ayr to Newry, County Antrim. She was refloated on 1 April.
Fjulan	Norway	The steamship was wrecked at Berlevåg.
Lanarkshire	United Kingdom	The steamship was driven ashore at Barr Point, Ireland. She was on a voyage from Glasgow, Renfrewshire to Cardiff, Glamorgan. She was refloated.
Lina	Norway	The yacht was wrecked at Berlvåg.
Louis Napoleon	United Kingdom	The schooner ran aground on the Goodwin Sands, Kent. She was refloated with assistance and taken into The Downs.
Olga	Norway	The steamship was wrecked at Berlevåg.
Pater	Sweden	The ship ran aground on the Arklow Bank, in the Irish Sea off the coast of County Wicklow, United Kingdom. Her fifteen crew were rescued by the Arklow Lifeboat Out Pensioner ( Royal National Lifeboat Institution). Pater was on a voyage from Liverpool, Lancashire, United Kingdom to New York, United States. The wreck was towed in to Wicklow Bay on 5 March.
Susan	United Kingdom	The ship was driven ashore at Islandmagee, County Antrim. She was on a voyage from Magheramorne, County Antrim to Bangor, County Down.
Telephone	United Kingdom	The schooner ran aground and capsized at Fowey, Cornwall.
Watchful	United States	The schooner sank in Pamlico Sound 7 nautical miles (13 km) north west of Life Saving Station No. 23, 6th District. Her crew of seven made it to shore in the ship's boat. Later raised by a wrecking company.
Unnamed	Norway	The coaster was wrecked at Berlevåg.

== 31 March ==
List of shipwrecks: 31 March 1879
Ship	State	Description
Aphrodite	United Kingdom	The ship ran aground in the Hooghly River. She was on a voyage from London to Calcutta, India. She was refloated and resumed her voyage.
Fearless	United Kingdom	The smack ran aground on the Newcombe Sands, in the North Sea off the coast of Suffolk. She was refloated and towed in to Lowestoft, Suffolk in a severely leaky condition.
Hermit	United Kingdom	The ship was destroyed by fire at Valparaíso, Chile.
Richard Pearne	United States	The ship was driven ashore at Port Natal, Natal Colony. .
Sampson	United Kingdom	The sloop collided with the schooner Chester (United Kingdom) and sank in the Irish Sea off Great Orme Head, Caernarfonshire. Her crew were rescued. Sampson was on a voyage from Cemlyn, Anglesey to Lancaster, Lancashire.
Skjold	Denmark	The brig was driven ashore and wrecked on Papa Westray, Orkney Islands, United Kingdom. Her crew were rescued. She was on a voyage from Aarhus to Philadelphia, Pennsylvania, United States

== Unknown date ==
List of shipwrecks: Unknown date in March 1879
Ship	State	Description
Alarm	United Kingdom	The ship was driven ashore on Long Island. She was on a voyage from Barbados to Antigua. She was refloated and completed her voyage.
Ambriz	Spain	The steamship ran aground in the Elbe. She was refloated and resumed her voyage but put in to Plymouth, Devon, United Kingdom for inspection.
Anna Margretha	Denmark	The ship was discovered on the Westboro Head Sands, in the Thames Estuary. She was taken in to London, United Kingdom.
Annie Wharton	Canada	The brigantine was abandoned in the Atlantic Ocean before 27 March. She was on a voyage from London to Newhaven, Connecticut, United States. She came ashore at the mouth of the Schuylkill River in April.
Arabistan	United Kingdom	The schooner foundered in the North Sea.
Brothers	United Kingdom	The ship was abandoned in the North Sea before 5 March.
Caroline	United Kingdom	The ship was abandoned in the North Sea. Her crew were rescued. She was on a voyage from St. Davids, Pembrokeshire to Sønderborg, Denmark.
Carpin	United Kingdom	The steamship ran aground on The Gantocks before 22 March.
Chinsura	United Kingdom	The steamship was driven ashore at False Point, India. She was later refloated.
Cora	Belgium	The ship ran aground in the Scheldt. She was on a voyage from Antwerp to Hong Kong. She was refloated and resumed her voyage, but put in to Plymouth, Devon, United Kingdom in a leaky condition.
Diamant	United Kingdom	The barque ran aground off "Julebeck". She was on a voyage from Hartlepool, County Durham to Memel, Germany. She was refloated and taken in to Helsingør, Denmark.
Eblana	Canada	The barque was wrecked at Pisarinco, New Brunswick. with the loss of seven of her crew. She was on a voyage from Newport, Monmouthshire, United Kingdom to Saint John, New Brunswick.
Enok	Norway	The schooner was driven ashore at Longhope, Orkney, United Kingdom. She was on a voyage from Sarpsborg to Wick, Caithness, United Kingdom. She was later refloated and completed her voyage, arriving at Wick on 26 March.
Etoile du Nord	France	The brig was driven ashore at Whydah, Dahomey before 20 March. The ship was plundered by the local inhabitants.
Falkee	Denmark	The schooner was driven ashore near Sæby.
Familien	Denmark	The schooner was driven ashore at the Rammekens Castle, Zeeland, Netherlands. She was on a voyage from Antwerp, Belgium to Leith, Lothian, United Kingdom.
Garland	United Kingdom	The brigantine caught fire in the Atlantic Ocean and was abandoned. All on board were rescued. She was on a voyage from Cádiz, Spain to Baltimore, Maryland, United States.
Garonne	France	The steamship was driven ashore at Beckfoot, Cumberland, United Kingdom. She was refloated and taken in to Silloth, Cumberland.
Hannah Anne Magrethe	United Kingdom	The ship ran aground on the Burrows Sand, in the North Sea off the coast of Essex, United Kingdom and sank. Her crew survived.
Harvan	United States	The brig ran aground on the Goodwin Sands, Kent, United Kingdom. Her crew were rescued by the Ramsgate Lifeboat.
Isabella	United Kingdom	The ship was abandoned in the Atlantic Ocean with the loss of thirteen of her 21 crew. Survivors were rescued by a German vessel.
James Shaw	United Kingdom	The steamship ran aground at Barrow-in-Furness, Lancashire. She was on a voyage from Bilbao to Barrow-in-Furness. She was refloated and taken in to Barrow-in-Furness in a leaky condition.
John Watt	United States	The ship was damaged by fire at New Orleans, Louisiana.
La Decidée	France	The schooner was wrecked on St. Paul Island, Nova Scotia, Canada. Her crew were rescued by Queen of the Seas (United Kingdom).
Leo	United Kingdom	The steamship collided with the steamship Strauss (Germany) and sank in the River Thames at Cubitt Town, Middlesex. Her crew survived. Leo was on a voyage from London to Gravesend, Kent.
Leopoldine	Germany	The brig foundered at sea. Her crew were rescued. She was on a voyage from Sunderland, County Durham, United Kingdom to Stettin.
Mathilda	Norway	The barque was abandoned in the North Sea. Her crew were rescued by the smack Rhea (United Kingdom). Mathilda was on a voyage from Tvedestrand to Kinsale, County Cork, United Kingdom. She was towed in to Grimsby, Lincolnshire, United Kingdom by Rhea and the smack Joseph and Sarah (United Kingdom)
Margot	United Kingdom	The brig was wrecked between "Tambava" and Vohemar, Merina Kingdom.
Memlo	Canada	The barque ran aground in the River Tees. She was on a voyage from Middlesbrough, Yorkshire, United Kingdom to Philadelphia. She was refloated and put back to Middlesbrough for repairs.
Mercator	Belgium	The steamship departed from Antwerp for New York. Presumed subsequently foundered with the loss of all on board. A lifeboat was recovered by Chateaubriand (France) on 19 June.
Myosotis	France	The ship was wrecked on Agaléga, Mauritius on or before 25 March. All on board were rescued.
Mystic Tie	United Kingdom	The ship was wrecked in the Rio Grande do Sul. She was on a voyage from Wilmington, Delaware, United States to the Rio Grande do Sul.
Nankin	France	The steamship was driven ashore near Rye, Sussex, United Kingdom. She was refloated on 17 March and resumed her voyage.
Princess Royal	United Kingdom	The brigantine struck rocks off Dunstanburgh, Northumberland. She was on a voyage from Weymouth, Dorset to Blyth, Northumberland. She was towed in to Blyth, where she sank.
Pompeo	Italy	The brig ran aground at Constantinople, Ottoman Empire. She was on a voyage from Constanţa, United Principalities to an Adriatic port. She was refloated.
Secret	United Kingdom	The barque departed from Hartlepool for Danzig, Germany in late March. Although she was subsequently sighted off Helsingør, she was presumed to have foundered with the loss of all hands.
St. Clair	United Kingdom	The steamship was driven ashore at Ardrishaig, Argyllshire. She was refloated and taken in to Glasgow.
Surprise	United Kingdom	The schooner was driven ashore on Ynys Dulas, Anglesey. Her crew were rescued.
Susie May	United Kingdom	The schooner was driven ashore at Wissant, Pas-de-Calais, France.
Telephone	United Kingdom	The schooner ran aground and capsized at Fowey, Cornwall.
Terzo	Austria-Hungary	The brig was driven ashore at Aboukir, Egypt. She was on a voyage from Trieste to Alexandria, Egypt.
Tidefeld	Germany	The galiot sprang a severe leak and was beached at Lemvig, Norway, where she was wrecked. Her crew were rescued. She was on a voyage from Brake to Arendal, Norway.
Vandringsmanden	Norway	The ship was abandoned off the coast of Jutland. Three crew were rescued by the smack Amaranth (United Kingdom).
Whitehall	United Kingdom	The steamship sank at Galaţi, United Principalities. She was refloated on 26 March and found to be severely damaged.
Witton Castle	United Kingdom	The brig was wrecked at Villaricos, Spain. Her crew were rescued.
Unnamed	Flag unknown	The steamship ran aground on the Goodwin Sands.
Unnamed	Flag unknown	The ship was wrecked on Europa Island before 25 March.
