= 1880 Grand National =

English steeplechase horse race

- Grand National
- Location: Aintree
- Date: 19 March 1880
- Winning horse: (Republic of Ireland) Empress
- Starting price: 8/1
- Jockey: (Republic of Ireland) Mr Tommy Beasley
- Trainer: (Republic of Ireland) Henry Linde
- Owner: (France) Pierre Ducrot
- Conditions: Good

The 1880 Grand National was the 42nd renewal of the Grand National horse race that took place at Aintree near Liverpool, England, on 19 March 1880.

== Finishing Order ==
Position	Name	Jockey	Handicap (st-lb)	SP	Distance
01	Empress	Tommy Beasley	10-7	8-1	2 Lengths
02	The Liberator	Garry Moore	12-7	11-2	Head
03	Downpatrick	Mr P Gavin	10-7	100-15	2 Lengths
04	Jupiter Tonans	John Lee-Barber	10-5	50-1	
05	Woodbrook	Harry Beasley	11-7	25-1	
06	Wild Monarch	Robert I'Anson	11-11	11-2	
07	Victor II	Willie Morris	10-7	50-1	
08	Victoria	J Beasley	10-7	100-7	
09	Shifnal	Arthur Smith	11-11	20-1	
10	Dainty	Sam Darling	10-2	66-1	Last to complete

== Non-finishers ==
Fence	Name	Jockey	Handicap (st-lb)	SP	Fate
02	Regal	Joe Cannon	11-11	5-1	Fell
01	Gunlock	Henry(?) Davis	10-5	100-3	Refused
01	Sleight of Hand	John Childs	10-4	50-1	Refused
02	St George	George Levett	10-2	25-1	Refused
