= San Gregorio, L'Aquila =

San Gregorio
- Frazione
- Location of San Gregorio in Italy
- Coordinates: 42°19′40″N 13°29′45″E
- Country: Italy
- Region: Abruzzo
- Province: L’Aquila
- Comune: L'Aquila
- Elevation: 584 m (1,916 ft)

Population (1 January 2007)
  - Total: 433
- Demonym: Sangregoriesi
- Time zone: UTC+1 (CET)
  - Summer (DST): UTC+2 (CEST)
- Postal code: 67100
- Dialing code: 0862
- Patron saint: San Gregorio
- Website: Official website

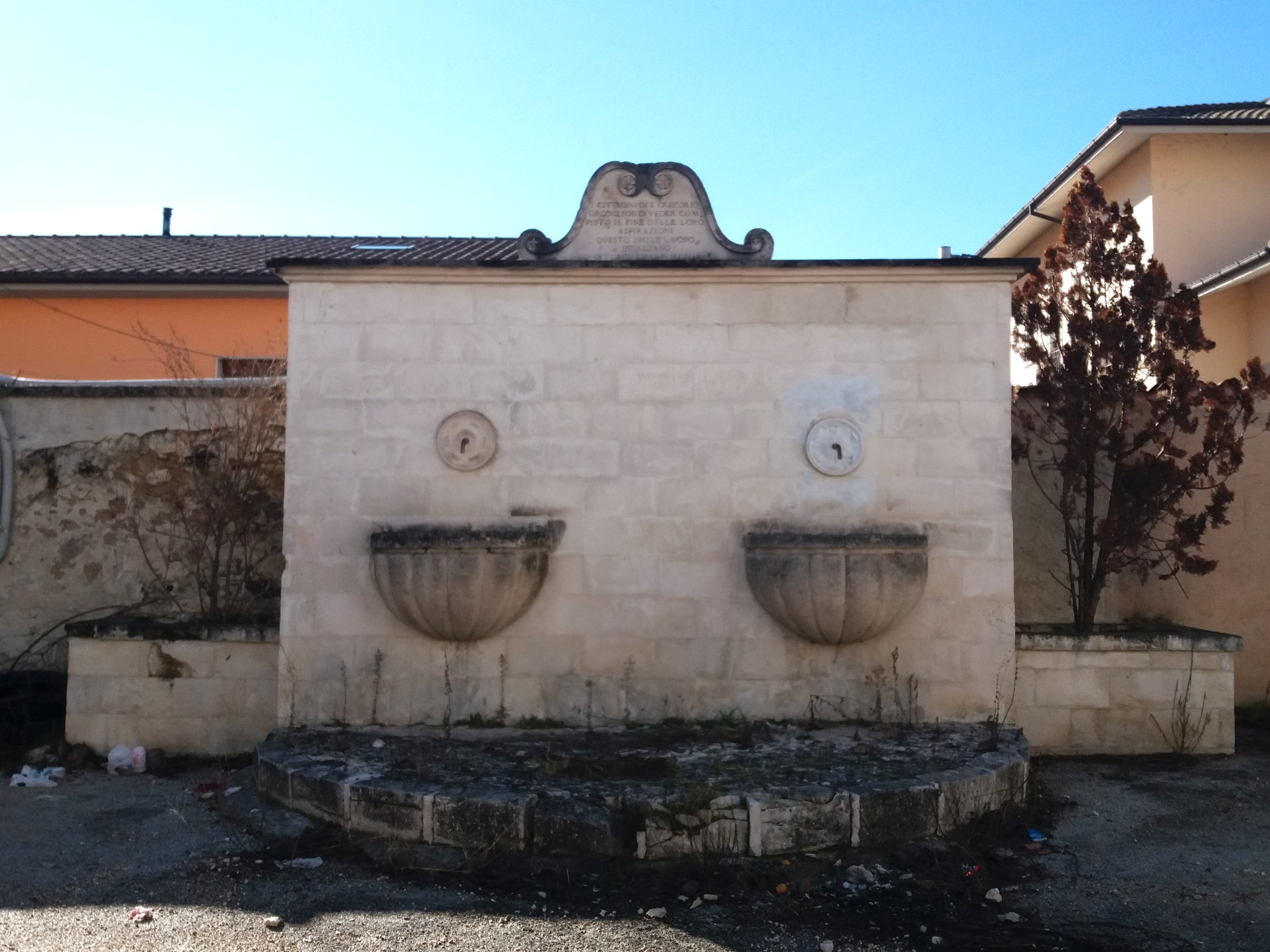

San Gregorio is a village in the Abruzzo region of central Italy. It is a frazione of the comune of L'Aquila. It sits 584 meters above sea level at the base of Monte Manicola. The village of San Gregorio is 12.11 kilometers from the town of L'Aquila, of which it is considered a suburb community (Fraction or Frazione). Italy's SS17 Highway is its main transportation artery. The village sits near an active earthquake fault zone in the Valley of the Aterno-Pescara.

== Overview ==
San Gregorio is a rural agricultural suburb of the city of L'Aquila and is closely tied to its history. The area has been inhabited for approximately 1,000 years and initially it did not have a defined city structure. During the Roman conquest, the fertility of the area guaranteed food production for Rome. During medieval times San Gregorio was known for its Romanesque-church.

On April 6, 2009, at 01:32 GMT (03:32 CEST) an earthquake of 6.3 magnitude struck central Italy (See 2009 L'Aquila earthquake) with its epicenter near San Gregorio, at 42°25′22″N, 13°23′40″E. It is estimated that 12 residents were killed, 8 of whom were killed when the village's medieval church collapsed. It was estimated that 95% of San Gregorio's buildings received some type of damage during the earthquake. A huge tent city was constructed for residents, and a base camp was set up in the city for rescuers. As part of its rebuilding efforts, other communities within Italy who also carry the name “San Gregorio” have given funds to San Gregorio in its effort to rebuild.

== Transport ==
San Gregorio has a stop on the Terni–Sulmona railway, with trains to L'Aquila and Sulmona.
