= Jeanette Threlfall =

English hymnwriter and author

- Born: 24 March 1821; Blackburn, Lancashire, England
- Died: 30 November 1880 (aged 59)
- Resting place: Highgate Cemetery
- Occupations: hymnwriter, poet
- Writing career
- Pen name: J. T.
- Language: English
- Genres: hymns, religious poetry
- Subject: Christianity
- Notable work: "Hosanna! loud hosanna"

Jeanette Threlfall (pen name, J. T.; 24 March 1821 – 30 November 1880) was a 19th-century English hymnwriter and author of other sacred poems. She published Woodsorrel, 1856; The Babe and the Princess, 1864; Sunshine and Shadow, 1873; and two little prose works. Threlfall was brought up by an uncle and other relatives as her parents died when she was young. Suffering from poor health during the greater part of her life served to deepen her spiritual faith, and gave her time to write hymns. Her literary and religious accomplishment were lauded after her death in 1880, by such authorities as Dean Arthur Penrhyn Stanley, Dean Frederic Farrar, and Bishop Christopher Wordsworth. "We praise Thee in the morning" may be taken as a specimen of her style, while her Palm Sunday hymn, "Hosanna! loud hosanna", was very popular with children.

== Early life and education ==
Jeanette Threlfall was born in Blackburn, Lancashire, on 24 March 1821. She was the daughter of Henry Threlfall, wine merchant, and Catherine Eccles, the latter a somewhat noticeable local family, who disapproved of the marriage.

Orphaned early in life, she became the "beloved inmate" (as a memorial-card bears) of the households successively of her uncle and aunt Bannister and Mary Jane Eccles, at Park Place, Blackburn, and Golden Hill, Leyland, Lancashire; and later of their daughter, Sarah Alice Aston, and her husband, of Dean's Yard, Westminster.

From about twelve years of age, her education was left to itself, but her great love of reading, combined with delicate health, prevented this from being a great disadvantage.

== Career ==
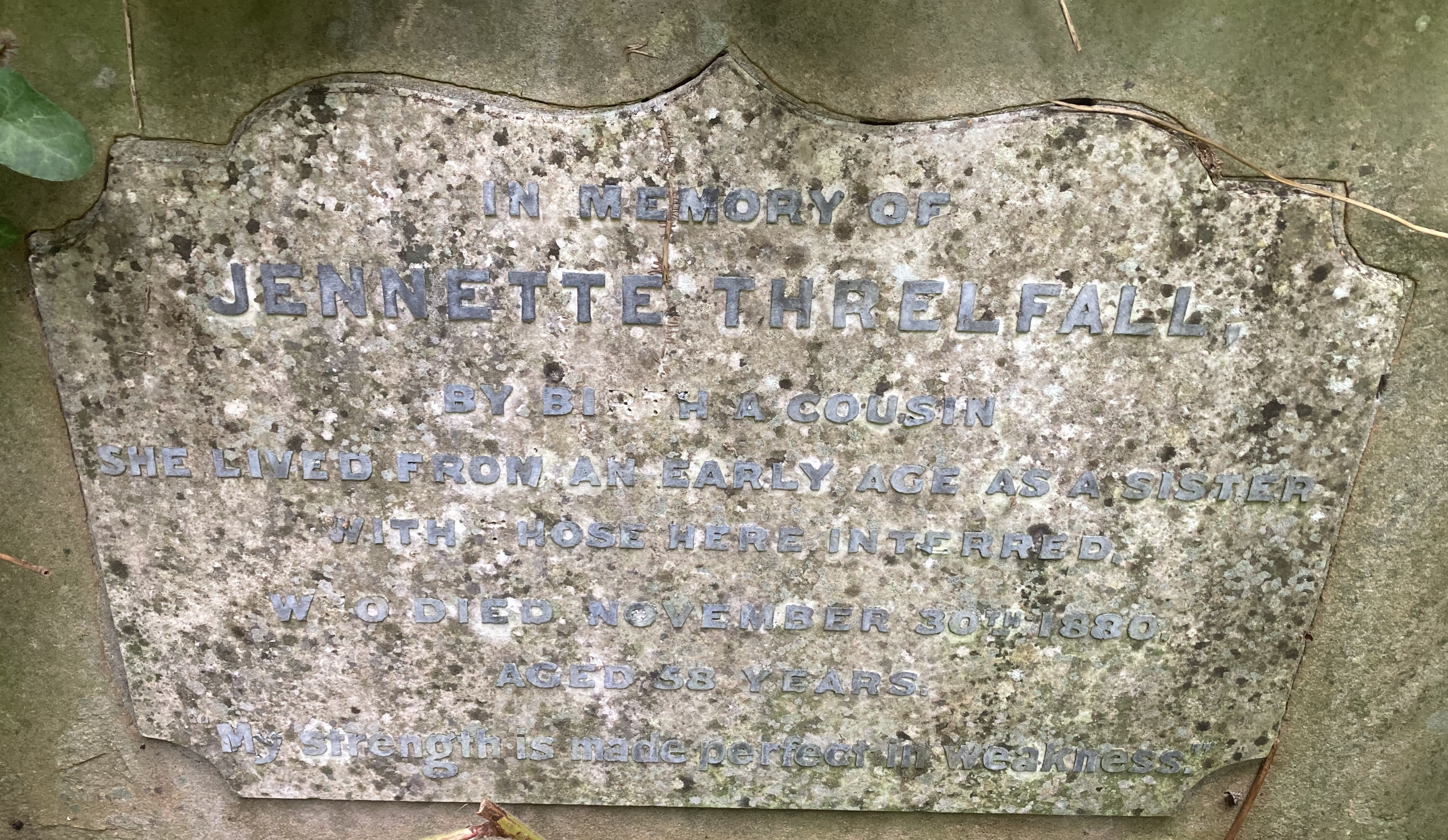
Grave of Jennette Threlfall in Highgate Cemetery

Threlfall worked as a Sunday school teacher. Throughout her life, she was a great reader, and made time to write sacred poems and hymns. These were sent anonymously to various periodicals. They were first collected and issued in a small volume, entitled Woodsorrel; or, Leaves from a Retired Home, by J. T., (London: J. Nisbet, 1856). (Note: According to Julian (1892), the title, Woodsorrel, was chosen from its name in Italian "Alleluia," and because Fra Angelico puts it, with daisies, at the foot of the Cross in one of his paintings.) The thirty-five poems in the volume did not appear to gain any notice except among friends. In 1873, she selected fifteen pieces from Woodsorrel and added 55 others, and published them as Sunshine and Shadow. Poems by Jeannette Threlfall. With Introduction by the Lord Bishop of Lincoln (Wordsworth) (London: Hunt). A third edition (1880) was entitled New Edition. With In Memoriam from the Sermons of the Dean of Westminster and Canon Farrar. The two memorial tributes were characterized as very tender and sweet.

Of Threlfall's hymns, those in collection include:— 1. Hosanna! loud hosanna, The little children sang. (Palm Sunday) 2. I think of Thee, O Saviour. (Good Friday). 3. Lo, to us a child is born. (Christmas). 4. Thou bidd'st us seek Thee early. (Early Piety.) 5. We praise Thee in the morning. (Morning.) 6. When from Egypt's house of bondage. (Children as Pilgrims.) These hymns are all taken from Threlfall's Sunshine and Shadow, 1873. I think of Thee, O Saviour was written during an illness, at her dictation, by a friend. Hosanna! loud hosanna, The little children sang was the most widely used of her compositions.

== Personal life ==
In 1877, Threlfall slipped during a carriage accident. The injuries led to a leg amputation. A second accident rendered her a helpless invalid. She bore her sufferings well, retaining a positive attitude till her death, 30 November 1880.

Threlfall was interred in the Aston family vault on the western side of Highgate Cemetery, (plot no.9123), on 4 December 1880. The vault is on a corner plot, almost opposite the tomb of George Wombwell.

== Themes and reception ==
In Julian (1892), it is remarked that "[her] sacred poems are not very well wrought, nor at all noticeable in thought or sentiment. But all through one feels that a sweet spirit utters itself."

Remarks by Stanley included:—

“If I may speak of one who has been taken from these precincts within the last week: when a life, bright and lovely in itself, is suddenly darkened by some terrible accident; when it has been changed from the enjoyment of everything to the enjoyment of nothing; when year by year, and week by week, the suffering, the weakness, have increased; and when yet, in spite of this, the patient sufferer has become the centre of the household, the adviser and counsellor of each; when there has been a constant stream of cheerfulness under the severest pain; when there has been a flow of gratitude for any act of kindness, however slight; when we recall the eager hope of such an one, that progress and improvement, not stagnation or repose, will be the destiny of the newly-awakened soul; then, when the end has come, we feel more than ever that the future is greater than the present.”

Remarks by Farrar included:—

“A few days ago there passed away a resident of this Parish, a member of this congregation, whose name many of the poor well know; who was their friend and their benefactor: who had the liberal hand and the large heart; who helped the charities of this parish with a spontaneous generosity which is extremely rare; whose purse was ever open, unasked, to every good work of which she heard; whose delicate mind was alive with Christian sympathy; who had pre-eminently “‘The faith, through constant watching wise, And the heart at leisure from itself, To soothe and sympathise.’”

Bishop Wordsworth praised her poems, and observed:—

“It is an occasion for great thankfulness to be able to point to poems, such as many of those in the present volume, in which considerable mental powers and graces of composition are blended with pure religious feeling, and hallowed by sound doctrine and fervent devotion.”

"Hosanna! loud hosanna!"
(hymn)

"Hosanna! loud hosanna!
The little children sang:

Through pillared court and temple
The lovely anthem rang;

To Jesus, who had blessed them,
Close folded to His breast,

The children sang their praises,
The simplest and the best."

Of Threlfall's "Hosanna! loud hosanna" (Matth. xxi. 15.), listed as a Whitsuntide hymn in Home Words (1868), Frances Ridley Havergal commented in 1881, that it "has become in the fullest sense a standard hymn. It is one of the brightest and most graceful hymns for the little ones that can adorn any collection".

== Selected works ==
- Woodsorrel, 1856
- The Babe and the Princess, 1864
- Sunshine and Shadow, 1873
