= Daughters of Our Lady of Mercy =

Catholic religious institute

The Daughters of Our Lady of Mercy (Italian: Figlie di Nostra Signora della Misericordia) is a religious institute of pontifical right whose members profess public vows of chastity, poverty, and obedience and follow the evangelical way of life in common. The constitutions were approved by Pope Pius X in 1904.

Their mission includes pastoral ministry, education of youth, care of the sick and aged.

This religious institute was founded in Savona, Italy, in 1837, by Maria Giuseppa Rossello, Franciscan tertiary, and her three companions (Pauline Barla, Angela, and Domenica Pessio).

The sisters have houses in 20 countries, including Italy, Germany, Romania, United Kingdom, Africa, India, Latin America and United States. The Generalate of the Congregation can be found in Savona, Italy.

On 31 December 2005 there are 988 sisters in 165 communities.
