= Maria Giuseppa Rossello =

Italian Catholic saint

Saint Maria Giuseppa Rossello FdM

Virgin
- Born: Benedetta Rossello; 27 May 1811; Albissola Marina, Savona, Kingdom of Sardinia
- Died: 7 December 1880 (aged 69); Savona, Kingdom of Italy
- Venerated in: Catholic Church (Daughters of Our Lady of Mercy)
- Beatified: 6 November 1938, Saint Peter's Square by Pope Pius XI
- Canonized: 12 June 1949, Saint Peter's Square by Pope Pius XII
- Feast: 7 December

Maria Giuseppa Rossello (27 May 1811 – 7 December 1880) was an Italian religious sister who founded the Daughters of Our Lady of Mercy. She has been declared a saint by the Catholic Church.

== Life ==
She was born Benedetta Rossello in Albissola Marina in 1811. She was the fourth of the ten children of Bartolomeo Rossello and Maria Dedone. As a child she assisted her parents with their work and took care of her siblings.

Rossello was devoted to the Blessed Virgin Mary and followed her religious vocation. This led her to becoming a member of the Third Order of Saint Francis at the age of sixteen. Benedetta would become the sole person of support for her household after the death of her mother and second brother as well as her sister Josephine and her father after this.

In 1837 Rosello responded to Agostino De Mari and his appeal for volunteers in education and she worked with the poor and uneducated. De Mari provided a small house to Rossello and her coworkers and it resulted in - on 10 August 1837 - the foundation of the Conservatory of the Sisters of Mercy and Saint John the Baptist. She had the task of Mistress of Novices and was also the treasurer of the institute.

On 22 October 1837 Rossello began a formal novitiate and was given the religious name of Maria Giuseppa, while the new religious institute was officially titled the Daughters of Our Lady of Mercy, with the aim of bringing the mercy of God into the world. The institute worked with the poor and the sick, lending their services in parishes, hospitals and schools. Rossello was later made Superior General of the congegration in 1840, filling that office for forty years. On 14 December 1840, their benefactor and collaborator De Mari died, already having prepared a draft of the Rule of Life of the institute.

Plagued with heart complications due to the strenuous work she undertook, Rossello died at the age of 69 on 7 December 1880. Buried in the local cemetery in Savona, she was re-interred into the motherhouse chapel in 1887. Official approval for the congregation was given by Pope Pius X in a decree on 12 January 1904.

== Sainthood ==
The cause of sainthood for Rossello commenced on 23 July 1927 on a local level in Savona, granting her the title of Servant of God. This local process culminated on 19 March 1936 when Pope Pius XI recognized her life of heroic virtue and proclaimed her to be Venerable.

The recognition of two miracles led to her beatification on 6 November 1938 and the approval of two other miracles led to her canonization on 12 June 1949 by Pope Pius XII.
