= 2015–16 Texas–Rio Grande Valley Vaqueros women's basketball team =

Intercollegiate basketball season

2015–16 Texas–Rio Grande Valley Vaqueros women's basketball
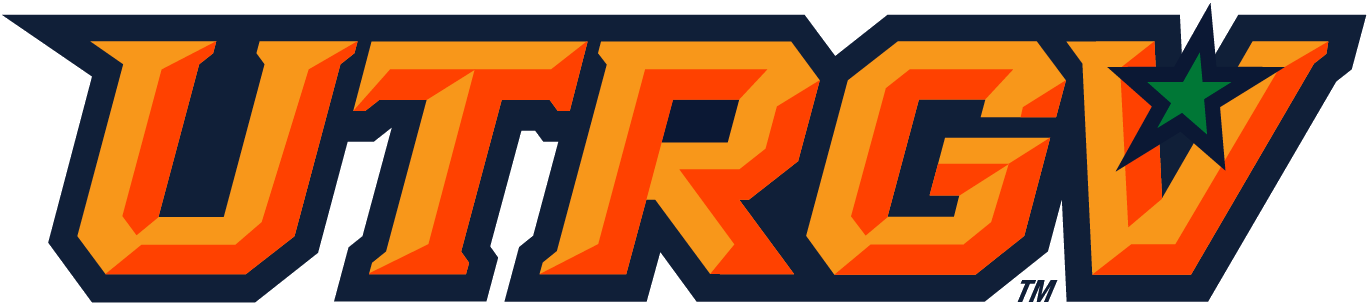

WNIT, First Round
- Conference: Western Athletic Conference
- Record: 19–14 (9–5 WAC)
- Head coach: Larry Tidwell (3rd season)
- Assistant coaches: Gabe Henry; Anthony Anderson; Hannah Burleson
- Home arena: UTRGV Fieldhouse

2015–16 WAC women's basketball standings
| | Conf. | | | | Overall |
| Team | W | | L | PCT | W | | L | PCT |
|---|---|---|---|---|---|---|---|---|
| New Mexico State † | 13 | – | 1 | .929 | 26 | – | 5 | .839 |
| UTRGV | 9 | – | 5 | .643 | 19 | – | 14 | .576 |
| Grand Canyon* | 8 | – | 6 | .571 | 16 | – | 15 | .516 |
| Utah Valley | 8 | – | 6 | .571 | 16 | – | 15 | .516 |
| Cal State Bakersfield | 8 | – | 6 | .571 | 12 | – | 19 | .387 |
| UMKC | 5 | – | 9 | .357 | 10 | – | 18 | .357 |
| Seattle | 3 | – | 11 | .214 | 9 | – | 21 | .300 |
| Chicago State | 2 | – | 12 | .143 | 4 | – | 25 | .138 |
† 2016 WAC tournament winner As of March 18, 2016 * Grand Canyon ineligible for WAC Basketball Tournament as part of reclassification from Division II; Rankings from AP poll

The 2015–16 Texas–Rio Grande Valley Vaqueros women's basketball team represented the University of Texas Rio Grande Valley during the 2015–16 NCAA Division I women's basketball season. This was head coach Larry Tidwell's third season, but first under the UT-RGV label. The Vaqueros played their home games at the UTRGV Fieldhouse and were members of the Western Athletic Conference. This was the first season for UTRGV as an institution. Before the 2015–16 academic year, the University of Texas–Pan American and the University of Texas at Brownsville merged, forming the University of Texas Rio Grande Valley. They finished the season 19–14 and 9–5 in WAC play to finish in second place. They advanced to the championship game of the WAC women's tournament where they lost to New Mexico State. They were invited to the Women's National Invitation Tournament where they lost in the first round to TCU.

== Previous season ==
The Broncs finished the season 19–15, 9–5 in final WAC play to finish in third place. They lost in the championship of the WAC Tournament to New Mexico State.

== Departures ==
| Name | Number | Pos. | Height | Year | Hometown | Notes |
|---|---|---|---|---|---|---|
| Troi Swain | 1 | G | 5'6" | Freshman | Austin, TX | Transferred |
| Tonisha Walker | 3 | G | 5'6" | Senior | Gardner, KS | Graduated |
| Stephanie Onyeje | 12 | G | 5'5" | Freshman | Pflugerville, TX | Transferred |
| T'Ondria Nolen | 14 | G | 5'7" | Senior | Wichita, KS | Graduated |
| Crystal Cardenas | 20 | G | 5'7" | Freshman | Mercedes, TX | |
| Brittany Bush | 21 | F | 6'1" | Senior | Moline, IL | Graduated |
| Cha'zaye Wright | 25 | F | 5'8" | Senior | DeSoto, TX | Graduated |
| Cherrell Price | 33 | F | 5'11" | Senior | Midwest City, OK | Graduated |

== 2015–16 media ==
For the first time in club history women's basketball games will be televised. 9 of 11 home games will air on TWCS (Ch 323), with 6 of the 9 games airing live. The other two home games will air on the TWCS Alternate Channel (Ch 825). Other games will air on WAC Digital Network or road teams video feeds.

== Roster ==
2015–16 UTRGV Vaqueros women's basketball team
Players
Coaches

| Pos. | # | Name | Height | Year | Previous school | Hometown |
|---|---|---|---|---|---|---|
| G | 1 | Bernesha Peters | 5 ft 3 in (1.6 m) | Fr | Spring | Spring, TX |
| G/F | 2 | Yadira Ramirez | 5 ft 11 in (1.8 m) | Fr | Hanks | El Paso, TX |
| G | 3 | Angela Villarreal | 5 ft 6 in (1.68 m) | Fr | Weslaco | Weslaco, TX |
| G | 4 | Idil Türk | 5 ft 9 in (1.75 m) | Fr | Bodwell | Istanbul, Turkey |
| F | 5 | Hildur Björg Kjartansdóttir | 6 ft 2 in (1.88 m) | So | FSN | Stykkishólmur, Iceland |
| G | 10 | Michelle Marquez | 5 ft 3 in (1.6 m) | Fr | Weslaco East | Weslaco, TX |
| G | 11 | Shawnte' Goff | 5 ft 8 in (1.73 m) | Jr | Copperas Cove | Copperas Cove, TX |
| G | 15 | Nichele Hyman | 5 ft 10 in (1.78 m) | Fr | Clovis | Clovis, NM |
| F | 21 | Anushka Maldonado | 6 ft 1 in (1.85 m) | Jr | Yelm; Odessa College | Roy, WA |
| G/F | 22 | Jada Bennett | 5 ft 3 in (1.6 m) | RS Jr | Sherman; North Florida | Sherman, TX |
| F | 23 | Micheline Mercelita | 5 ft 11 in (1.8 m) | RS So | Edinburg | Edinburg, TX |
| G | 24 | Rickell Preston | 5 ft 10 in (1.78 m) | Sr | Hahnville | Killona, LA |
| G | 30 | Amanda Ramirez | 5 ft 5 in (1.65 m) | RS Fr | Los Fresnos | Los Frenos, TX |
| F | 32 | Lile Havili | 6 ft 1 in (1.85 m) | Jr | Granger; Western Nebraska CC | Salt Lake City, UT |
| F | 33 | Mary Savoy | 6 ft 0 in (1.83 m) | Jr | West Salem; Midland College | Salem, OR |
| G | 34 | Sica Cuzic | 5 ft 11 in (1.8 m) | Fr | Trinity International | Galati, Romania |
| F | 43 | Tristan Murphy | 6 ft 1 in (1.85 m) | Fr | Stanwood | Stanwood, WA |
| F | 44 | Laura Van Tilburg | 6 ft 3 in (1.91 m) | So | Weslaco | Weslaco, TX |

Head coach

- Larry Tidwell (Austin College)

Assistant coach(es)

- Gabe Henry (Gonzaga)
- Anthony Anderson (FIU)
- Hannah Burleson (Texas A&M–Corpus Christi)

Legend

- (C) Team captain
- (S) Suspended
- (I) Ineligible
- (W) Walk-on
- Injured
- Current redshirt

Roster

== Schedule and results ==
| Date time, TV | Rank^{#} | Opponent^{#} | Result | Record | Site (attendance) city, state |
Non-conference regular season
| 11/13/2015*; 2:30 pm | | vs. East Carolina; Islanders Classic | L 50–79 | 0–1 | American Bank Center (76); Corpus Christi, TX |
| 11/14/2015*; 4:30 pm | | vs. Cal Poly; Islanders Classic | W 66–58 | 2–1 | American Bank Center (146); Corpus Christi, TX |
| 11/16/2015*; 7:00 pm, TWCS | | Concordia | W 90–44 | 2–1 | UTRGV Fieldhouse (613); Edinburg, TX |
| 11/18/2015*; 7:00 pm, TWCS Alt | | Texas Lutheran | W 90–38 | 3–1 | UTRGV Fieldhouse (545); Edinburg, TX |
| 11/21/2015*; 1:00 pm, ESPN3 | | at Eastern Michigan | L 56–78 | 3–2 | Convocation Center (443); Ypsilanti, MI |
| 11/24/2015*; 9:00 pm | | at UC Santa Barbara | W 62–60 | 4–2 | The Thunderdome (310); Santa Barbara, CA |
| 11/28/2015*; 2:00 pm | | at TCU | L 67–71 | 4–3 | University Recreation Center (1,543); Fort Worth, TX |
| 12/01/2015*; 7:00 pm | | at Texas A&M–Corpus Christi | L 46–49 | 4–4 | Dugan Wellness Center (613); Corpus Christi, TX |
| 12/03/2015*; 6:00 pm | | at Incarnate Word | W 68–50 | 5–4 | McDermott Center (206); San Antonio, TX |
| 12/05/2015*; 7:00 pm | | at Oklahoma State | L 54–78 | 5–5 | Gallagher-Iba Arena (2,332); Stillwater, OK |
| 12/07/2015*; 7:00 pm, Cox Kansas | | at Kansas State | L 43–61 | 5–6 | Bramlage Coliseum (3,872); Manhattan, KS |
| 12/17/2015*; 7:00 pm, TWCS Alt. | | Incarnate Word | W 60–47 | 6–6 | UTRGV Fieldhouse (711); Edinburg, TX |
| 12/20/2015*; 1:00 pm | | at Houston | W 55–45 | 7–6 | Hofheinz Pavilion (792); Houston, TX |
| 12/30/2015*; 7:00 pm, TWCS Alt. | | Evangel | W 75–60 | 8–6 | UTRGV Fieldhouse (544); Edinburg, TX |
| 01/01/2016*; 11:00 am | | at Syracuse | L 32–91 | 8–7 | Carrier Dome (442); Syracuse, NY |
WAC regular season
| 01/07/2016; 7:00 pm, TWCS | | Grand Canyon | W 52–28 | 9–7 (1–0) | UTRGV Fieldhouse (445); Edinburg, TX |
| 01/09/2016; 7:00 pm, TWCS | | Utah Valley | W 61–48 | 10–7 (2–0) | UTRGV Fieldhouse (611); Edinburg, TX |
| 01/14/2016; 7:00 pm | | at Chicago State | W 64–56 | 11–7 (3–0) | Emil and Patricia Jones Convocation Center (100); Chicago, IL |
| 01/16/2016; 7:00 pm | | at UMKC | W 62–53 | 12–7 (4–0) | Swinney Recreation Center (247); Kansas City, MO |
| 01/21/2016; 7:00 pm, TWCS | | Cal State Bakersfield | W 60–46 | 13–7 (5–0) | UTRGV Fieldhouse (1,268); Edinburg, TX |
| 01/23/2016; 7:00 pm, TWCS* | | Seattle | L 71–74 | 13–8 (5–1) | UTRGV Fieldhouse (1,108); Edinburg, TX |
| 01/30/2016; 7:00 pm, TWCS* | | New Mexico State | L 57–68 | 13–9 (5–2) | UTRGV Fieldhouse (1,709); Edinburg, TX |
| 02/04/2016; 12:00 pm | | at Utah Valley | L 57–71 | 13–10 (5–3) | PE Building (1,389); Orem, UT |
| 02/06/2016; 5:00 pm, Cox7 | | at Grand Canyon | W 68–66 | 14–10 (6–3) | GCU Arena (376); Phoenix, AZ |
| 02/13/2016; 1:00 pm, TWCS | | UMKC | L 57–59 | 14–11 (6–4) | UTRGV Fieldhouse (668); Edinburg, TX |
| 02/18/2016; 9:00 pm | | at Seattle | W 76–71 | 15–11 (7–4) | Connolly Center (262); Seattle, WA |
| 02/20/2016; 3:00 pm | | at Cal State Bakersfield | L 66–80 | 15–12 (7–5) | Icardo Center (878); Bakersfield, CA |
| 02/27/2016; 7:00 pm, TWCS | | Chicago State | W 78–56 | 16–12 (8–5) | UTRGV Fieldhouse (522); Edinburg, TX |
| 03/05/2016; 2:00 pm, FSSW+/ESPN3 | | at New Mexico State | W 66–55 | 17–12 (9–5) | Pan American Center (1,612); Las Cruces, NM |
WAC Women's Tournament
| 03/09/2016; 6:30 pm | | vs. Chicago State; Quarterfinals | W 60–52 | 18–12 | Orleans Arena; Paradise, NV |
| 03/11/2016; 4:30 pm | | vs. Cal State Bakersfield; Semifinals | W 73–72 ^{2OT} | 19–12 | Orleans Arena; Paradise, NV |
| 03/11/2016; 3:00 pm, ESPNU | | vs. New Mexico State; Championship Game | L 53–80 | 19–13 | Orleans Arena (777); Paradise, NV |
WNIT
| 03/17/2016*; 7:00 pm | | at TCU; First Round | L 73–97 | 19–14 | Schollmaier Arena (910); Fort Worth, TX |
*Non-conference game. ^{#}Rankings from AP Poll. (#) Tournament seedings in parentheses. All times are in Central.

- - Games will be televised on tape delay.

== See also ==
- 2015–16 Texas–Rio Grande Valley Vaqueros men's basketball team
