= 2016–17 Grand Canyon Antelopes women's basketball team =

Intercollegiate basketball season

2016–17 Grand Canyon Antelopes women's basketball
- Conference: Western Athletic Conference
- Record: 15–12 (7–7 WAC)
- Head coach: Trent May (10th season)
- Assistant coaches: John Marcum; Milee Karee; Krystal Thomas
- Home arena: GCU Arena

2016–17 WAC women's basketball standings
	Conf.				Overall
Team	W		L	PCT	W		L	PCT
New Mexico State †	14	–	0	1.000	24	–	7	.774
Cal State Bakersfield	10	–	4	.714	15	–	14	.517
Seattle	10	–	4	.714	15	–	18	.455
UTRGV	8	–	6	.571	19	–	14	.576
Grand Canyon*	7	–	7	.500	15	–	12	.556
UMKC	4	–	10	.286	10	–	19	.345
Utah Valley	3	–	11	.214	9	–	22	.290
Chicago State	0	–	14	.000	0	–	29	.000
† 2017 WAC tournament winner As of March 19, 2017; Rankings from AP poll * Ineligible for WAC Basketball Tournament as part of reclassification from Division II

The 2016–17 Grand Canyon Antelopes women's basketball team represented Grand Canyon University in Phoenix, Arizona, during the 2016–17 NCAA Division I women's basketball season. It was head coach Trent May's tenth season at Grand Canyon. The Antelopes competed as members of the Western Athletic Conference and played their home games at GCU Arena. The 2016–17 season was year 4 of a 4-year transitional period for Grand Canyon from D2 to D1. In years 2–4, Grand Canyon was classified as a D1 school for scheduling purposes. They played a full conference schedule, and they could win the regular season conference title. However Grand Canyon could not participate in the conference tourney until the 2017–18 season, at which time they would also be able to enter the NCAA tournament, should they win the conference. Grand Canyon was eligible to participate in the WBI or WNIT should they be invited. They finished the season 15–12, 7–7 in WAC play to finish in fifth place.

On March 7, 2017, it was announced that Trent May would not return as head coach. He finished at Grand Canyon with a 10 year record of 195–96.

== Roster ==
2016–17 Grand Canyon Antelopes women's basketball team
Players
Coaches

Pos.	#	Name	Height	Year	Previous school	Hometown
G	1	Aniya Baker	5 ft 8 in (1.73 m)	RS Sr	Perris HS; UC Davis/San Jose State	Perris, CA
G	2	August Touchard	5 ft 6 in (1.68 m)	Sr	JSerra Catholic	Newport Beach, CA
F/C	4	Marina Laramie	6 ft 2 in (1.88 m)	RS Sr	Ft. Zumwalt West; Indiana State/East Carolina	St. Louis, MO
G	5	Jessica Gajewski	5 ft 11 in (1.8 m)	RS Jr	Mountain Creek State	Brisbane, Australia
G	10	Alyx Bloom	5 ft 5 in (1.65 m)	Sr	Clay Center; Hutchinson CC	Clay Center, KS
G	11	Casey Rarrick	5 ft 8 in (1.73 m)	RS So	Saguaro	Scottsdale, AZ
C	12	Erika Thomas	6 ft 2 in (1.88 m)	RS Sr	The First Academy; Connecticut	Champaign, IL
G	13	Laura Marcos Canedo	5 ft 8 in (1.73 m)	RS Sr	Colegio Champagnat; South Florida	Salamanca, Spain
G	15	Alia Parsons	5 ft 10 in (1.78 m)	Fr	Silverton	Woodburn, OR
G/F	20	Vanessa Murphy	6 ft 1 in (1.85 m)	Fr	Xavier College Prep	Phoenix, AZ
G	22	Carley Turnbull	5 ft 10 in (1.78 m)	Fr	Mesa	Mesa, AZ
G	23	Brie Mobley	5 ft 9 in (1.75 m)	Jr	Winter Haven; UNC Wilmington	Winter Haven, FL
F	24	Kiara Clark	5 ft 10 in (1.78 m)	RS Jr	Centennial; Glendale	Glendale, AZ
C	30	Julieh Clark	6 ft 3 in (1.91 m)	Sr	Sanger; Panola College	Denton, TX
F	32	Tanesha Daniels	6 ft 1 in (1.85 m)	Sr	Fremont; Salt Lake CC	Brigham City, UT
C	42	Katelyn Lee	6 ft 3 in (1.91 m)	RS So	Gordon Lee	Chickamauga, GA
G	44	Jaclyn Lanz	5 ft 7 in (1.7 m)	Jr	St, Mary's Academy	Vancouver, WA
F	50	Zelor Massaquoi	5 ft 7 in (1.7 m)	Jr	Reservoir	Monrovia, Liberia

Head coach

- Trent May (Southern Nazarene)

Assistant coach(es)

- John Marcum (Oklahoma Baptist)
- Milee Karre (Grand Canyon)
- Krystal Thomas (Duke)

Legend

- (C) Team captain
- (S) Suspended
- (I) Ineligible
- (W) Walk-on
- Injured
- Current redshirt

Roster

== Schedule and results ==
Date time, TV	Rank^{#}	Opponent^{#}	Result	Record	Site (attendance) city, state
Exhibition
11/08/2016*; 10:00 am, GCU TV		Western State Colorado	W 68–48		GCU Arena; Phoenix, AZ
01/04/2017*; 7:00 pm, GCU TV		Arizona Christian	W 77–54		GCU Arena (305); Phoenix, AZ
Non-conference regular season
11/11/2016*; 7:00 pm, GCU TV		Alcorn State	W 77–44	1–0	GCU Arena (869); Phoenix, AZ
11/17/2016*; 5:00 pm, ACC Extra		at Duke	L 47–90	1–1	Cameron Indoor Stadium (3,040); Durham, NC
11/22/2016*; 6:00 pm		at Rice	L 50–64	1–2	Tudor Fieldhouse (498); Houston, TX
11/25/2016*; 12:00 pm, GCU TV		Denver; GCU Thanksgiving Classic	W 73–70 ^{OT}	2–2	GCU Arena (235); Phoenix, AZ
11/26/2016*; 3:00 pm, GCU TV		Idaho; GCU Thanksgiving Classic	W 64–60	3–2	GCU Arena (638); Phoenix, AZ
11/29/2016*; 8:00 pm		at UC Riverside	L 64–77	3–3	The SRC (237); Riverside, CA
12/01/2016*; 7:00 pm, GCU TV		No. 13 Washington	L 66–101	3–4	GCU Arena (537); Phoenix, AZ
12/04/2016*; 12:00 pm, GCU TV		Florida Atlantic	W 81–60	4–4	GCU Arena (636); Phoenix, AZ
12/10/2016*; 1:00 pm, GCU TV		Cal Poly	W 64–59	5–4	GCU Arena (372); Phoenix, AZ
12/16/2016*; 6:30 pm		at Southern Utah	W 76–73	6–4	Centrum Arena (474); Cedar City, UT
12/19/2016*; 12:00 pm, GCU TV		Northern Arizona	W 76–65	7–4	GCU Arena (404); Phoenix, AZ
12/29/2016*; 8:30 pm, Oceanic		at Hawaii	L 47–51	7–5	Stan Sheriff Center (5,903); Honolulu, HI
12/31/2016*; 2:00 pm		at Chaminade	W 85–55	8–5	McCabe Gym (115); Honolulu, HI
WAC regular season
01/07/2017; 7:00 pm		at Utah Valley	W 62–46	9–5 (1–0)	UCCU Center (215); Orem, UT
01/12/2017; 7:00 pm, GCU TV		New Mexico State	L 65–81	9–6 (1–1)	GCU Arena (656); Phoenix, AZ
01/14/2017; 2:00 pm, WAC DN		UTRGV	W 60–59	10–6 (2–1)	GCU Arena (512); Phoenix, AZ
01/21/2017; 5:00 pm		at Seattle	L 60–86	10–7 (2–2)	Connolly Center (276); Seattle, WA
01/26/2017; 7:00 pm, GCU TV		UMKC	W 75–64	11–7 (3–2)	GCU Arena (657); Phoenix, AZ
01/28/2017; 7:00 pm, KASW		Chicago State	W 57–39	12–7 (4–2)	GCU Arena (1,039); Phoenix, AZ
02/04/2017; 2:00 pm		at Cal State Bakersfield	L 59–74	12–8 (4–3)	Icardo Center; Bakersfield, CA
02/09/2017; 6:00 pm, WAC DN		at UTRGV	L 49–52	12–9 (4–4)	UTRGV Fieldhouse (833); Edinburg, TX
02/12/2017; 2:00 pm, WAC DN		at New Mexico State	L 60–67	12–10 (4–5)	Pan American Center (1,741); Las Cruces, NM
02/16/2017; 7:00 pm, WAC DN		Seattle	W 82–77	13–10 (5–5)	GCU Arena (677); Phoenix, AZ
02/18/2017; 2:00 pm, GCU TV		Utah Valley	W 60–42	14–10 (6–5)	GCU Arena (563); Phoenix, AZ
02/23/2017; 6:00 pm		at Chicago State	W 73–62	15–10 (7–5)	Jones Convocation Center (228); Chicago, IL
02/25/2017; 1:00 pm, WAC DN		at UMKC	L 65–77	15–11 (7–6)	Swinney Recreation Center (323); Kansas City, MO
03/04/2017; 2:00 pm, WAC DN		Cal State Bakersfield	L 64–80	15–12 (7–7)	GCU Arena (655); Phoenix, AZ
*Non-conference game. ^{#}Rankings from AP Poll. (#) Tournament seedings in parentheses. All times are in Mountain Standard Time.

== See also ==
- 2016–17 Grand Canyon Antelopes men's basketball team
