= 2017 WAC women's basketball tournament =

2017 Western Athletic Conference women's basketball tournament
- Classification: Division I
- Season: 2016–17
- Teams: 7
- Site: Orleans Arena; Paradise, Nevada
- Champions: New Mexico State (3rd title)
- Winning coach: Mark Trakh (3rd title)
- MVP: Moriah Mack (New Mexico State)
- Television: ESPNU; WAC DN

2016–17 WAC women's basketball standings
	Conf.				Overall
Team	W		L	PCT	W		L	PCT
New Mexico State †	14	–	0	1.000	24	–	7	.774
Cal State Bakersfield	10	–	4	.714	15	–	14	.517
Seattle	10	–	4	.714	15	–	18	.455
UTRGV	8	–	6	.571	19	–	14	.576
Grand Canyon*	7	–	7	.500	15	–	12	.556
UMKC	4	–	10	.286	10	–	19	.345
Utah Valley	3	–	11	.214	9	–	22	.290
Chicago State	0	–	14	.000	0	–	29	.000
† 2017 WAC tournament winner As of March 19, 2017; Rankings from AP poll * Ineligible for WAC Basketball Tournament as part of reclassification from Division II

The 2017 WAC women's basketball tournament is a basketball tournament held on March 9–12, 2017, at the Orleans Arena in Paradise, Nevada. The #1 seed in the tournament received a first round bye to the semifinals. Grand Canyon did not compete in the 2017 women's basketball tournament. As a D2 to D1 transitioning school, they are ineligible to compete in the NCAA tournament until the 2018 season, so they could not win the conference tournament since the winner receives an automatic bid to the NCAA Tournament. However Grand Canyon was eligible to win the regular season title and is eligible to compete in the WNIT or WBI should they be invited.

New Mexico State won the conference tournament championship game over Seattle, 63–48, to earn an automatic trip to the NCAA women's tournament.

== Seeds ==
2017 WAC Women's Basketball Tournament seeds
Seed	School	Conference	Overall	Tiebreaker
1.	New Mexico State	14–0	23–6	
2.	Seattle	10–4	13–16	2–0 vs. Cal State Bakersfield
3.	Cal State Bakersfield	10–4	15–13	0–2 vs. Seattle
4.	Texas–Rio Grande Valley	8–6	18–12	
5.	UMKC	4–10	9–18	
6.	Utah Valley	3–11	8–21	
7.	Chicago State	0–14	0–28	

== Schedule ==
Session	Game	Time*	Matchup^{#}	Television	Attendance
Quarterfinals – Wednesday, March 8
1	1	2:00 PM	#4 UT-Rio Grande Valley vs. #5 UMKC	WAC DN	733
1	2	4:30 PM	#2 Seattle vs. #7 Chicago State	WAC DN	733
1	3	7:00 PM	#3 Cal State Bakersfield vs. #6 Utah Valley	WAC DN	733
Semifinals – Friday, March 10
2	4	12:00 PM	#1 New Mexico State vs. #5 UMKC	ESPN3	
2	5	2:30 PM	#2 Seattle vs. #6 Utah Valley	ESPN3	
Championship Game – Saturday, March 11
3	6	1:00 PM	#1 New Mexico State vs. #2 Seattle	ESPN3	851
*Game Times in PT. #-Rankings denote tournament seeding.

== Bracket ==
Quarterfinals; Wednesday, March 8
4	UT-Rio Grande Valley	69
5	UMKC	77
2	Seattle	78
7	Chicago State	60
3	Cal State Bakersfield	53(OT)
6	Utah Valley	59

Semifinals; Friday, March 10
1	New Mexico State	71
5	UMKC	63
2	Seattle	61
6	Utah Valley	60

Championship; Saturday, March 11
1	New Mexico State	63
2	Seattle	48

== See also ==
- 2017 WAC men's basketball tournament
