= Mark Trakh =

Jordanian college basketball coach (born 1955)

Biographical details
- Born: May 31, 1955 (age 71); Amman, Jordan
- Education: Long Beach State (1981)

Coaching career (HC unless noted)
- 1979–1980: Western HS (boys' sophomore)
- 1980–1993: Brea Olinda HS
- 1993–2004: Pepperdine
- 2004–2009: USC
- 2011–2017: New Mexico State
- 2017–2021: USC

Head coaching record
- Overall: 354–45 (.887) (high school); 450–317 (.587) (college)
- Tournaments: 2–7 (NCAA); 0–3 (WNIT)

Accomplishments and honors

Championships
- 4× WCC regular season (1999, 2000, 2002, 2003); 2× WCC tournament (2002, 2003); 3× WAC regular season (2015–2017); 2× WAC tournament (2015, 2016)

Mark Ozeir Trakh (born May 31, 1955) is a Jordanian college basketball coach who had been the women's basketball head coach at the University of Southern California (USC) from 2004 to 2009 and 2017 to 2021. Before his first stint at USC, he was head coach at Pepperdine University, and was head coach at New Mexico State University before returning to USC.

== Early life and education ==
Trakh was born in Amman, Jordan and moved to the United States with his family at age 4. Trakh's grandparents are from the Caucasus Mountains and moved to Amman in 1918 to escape Communist rule in Russia. Trakh can speak Circassian and Arabic in addition to English.

In the U.S., the Trakhs first lived in Connecticut and Paterson, New Jersey before settling in Wanaque, New Jersey. A baseball and basketball student-athlete, Trakh graduated from Lakeland Regional High School. After high school, Trakh attended Fairleigh Dickinson University, before joining his family in Southern California and transferring to Fullerton College in 1977. A journalism major, Trakh was sports editor at the Fullerton College student newspaper and freelancer for the Fullerton News-Tribune. In 1979, Trakh transferred to California State University, Long Beach (Long Beach State) to pursue a teaching credential. Trakh graduated from Long Beach State in 1981.

== Coaching career ==
While in high school, Trakh coached junior high and youth basketball. Trakh was boys' sophomore head coach for Western High School in Anaheim in the 1979–80 season before becoming girls' varsity head coach at Brea Olinda High School, a position he would hold from 1980 to 1993. Inheriting a program that won only four games in the previous two seasons, Trakh had a 354–45 overall record with four state titles (1989, 1991–93). At Brea Olinda, Trakh also was an English teacher.

From 1993 to 2004, Trakh was head coach at Pepperdine University. He led Pepperdine to four West Coast Conference regular season titles (1999, 2000, 2002, 2003) and had consecutive NCAA or WNIT appearances in his final six seasons.

Trakh was head coach at USC from 2004 to 2009, during which he had a 90–64 overall record with NCAA Tournament appearances in 2005 and 2006. Although Trakh recruited four top-12 recruiting classes, including the USA Today number-one class in 2006, USC never finished above fourth place in the Pac-10 in Trakh's five years and did not make any postseason tournaments after 2006. On April 8, 2009, Trakh resigned from USC.

On April 8, 2011, New Mexico State hired Trakh as head coach. Trakh's time at New Mexico State began with three consecutive losing seasons before the first of three consecutive first-place finishes in the Western Athletic Conference in 2015.

After six seasons at New Mexico State, he returned to USC during the 2017 offseason, replacing Cynthia Cooper-Dyke, who had resigned for unspecified reasons after the 2016–17 season.

Trakh announced his retirement from coaching on April 21, 2021.

== Personal life ==
Mark Trakh's younger brother Maz is also a basketball coach; at the time of Mark's return to USC, Maz was an assistant with the NBA's Washington Wizards.

== Head coaching record ==
This section covers Trakh's head coaching record in NCAA Division I.

Source for Pepperdine records:

Record table
| Season | Team | Overall | Conference | Standing | Postseason |
|---|---|---|---|---|---|
Pepperdine Waves (West Coast Conference) (1993–2004)
| 1993–94 | Pepperdine | 14–12 | 6–8 | T–5th | |
| 1994–95 | Pepperdine | 10–16 | 4–10 | T–6th | |
| 1995–96 | Pepperdine | 15–13 | 7–7 | T–4th | |
| 1996–97 | Pepperdine | 15–13 | 6–8 | 5th | |
| 1997–98 | Pepperdine | 21–10 | 10–4 | 2nd | |
| 1998–99 | Pepperdine | 21–9 | 11–3 | T–1st | WNIT First Round |
| 1999–2000 | Pepperdine | 21–10 | 12–2 | 1st | NCAA first round |
| 2000–01 | Pepperdine | 20–11 | 10–4 | T–3rd | WNIT First Round |
| 2001–02 | Pepperdine | 23–8 | 11–3 | 1st | NCAA first round |
| 2002–03 | Pepperdine | 22–8 | 12–2 | 1st | NCAA first round |
| 2003–04 | Pepperdine | 17–13 | 10–4 | T–2nd | WNIT First Round |
| Pepperdine: | | 199–123 (.618) | 99–55 (.643) | | |
USC Trojans (Pacific-10 Conference) (2004–2009)
| 2004–05 | USC | 20–11 | 12–6 | T–4th | NCAA second round |
| 2005–06 | USC | 19–12 | 11–7 | 5th | NCAA second round |
| 2006–07 | USC | 17–13 | 10–8 | 5th | |
| 2007–08 | USC | 17–13 | 10–8 | T–4th | |
| 2008–09 | USC | 17–15 | 9–9 | T–4th | |
| USC (first stint): | | 90–64 (.584) | 52–38 (.578) | | |
New Mexico State Aggies (Western Athletic Conference) (2011–2017)
| 2011–12 | New Mexico State | 6–24 | 3–11 | T–7th | |
| 2012–13 | New Mexico State | 15–16 | 7–11 | 8th | |
| 2013–14 | New Mexico State | 11–20 | 7–9 | T–6th | |
| 2014–15 | New Mexico State | 22–8 | 13–1 | 1st | NCAA first round |
| 2015–16 | New Mexico State | 26–5 | 13–1 | 1st | NCAA first round |
| 2016–17 | New Mexico State | 24–7 | 14–0 | 1st | NCAA first round |
| New Mexico State: | | 104–80 (.565) | 57–33 (.633) | | |
USC Trojans (Pac-12 Conference) (2017–2021)
| 2017–18 | USC | 20–11 | 9–9 | 7th | |
| 2018–19 | USC | 17–13 | 7–11 | T–8th | |
| 2019–20 | USC | 17–14 | 8–10 | | |
| 2020–21 | USC | 11–12 | 8–10 | | |
| USC: | | 65–50 (.565) | 36–40 (.474) | | |
| Total: | | 450–317 (.587) | | | |
National champion Postseason invitational champion Conference regular season champion Conference regular season and conference tournament champion Division regular season champion Division regular season and conference tournament champion Conference tournament champion
