= 2015–16 New Mexico State Aggies women's basketball team =

Intercollegiate basketball season

2015–16 New Mexico State Aggies women's basketball

WAC Regular Season & Tournament Champions

NCAA Women's Tournament, first round
- Conference: Western Athletic Conference
- Record: 26–5 (13–1 WAC)
- Head coach: Mark Trakh (6th season)
- Assistant coaches: Tamara Inoue; Aarika Hughes; Cecilia Russell-Nava
- Home arena: Pan American Center

2015–16 WAC women's basketball standings
	Conf.				Overall
Team	W		L	PCT	W		L	PCT
New Mexico State †	13	–	1	.929	26	–	5	.839
UTRGV	9	–	5	.643	19	–	14	.576
Grand Canyon*	8	–	6	.571	16	–	15	.516
Utah Valley	8	–	6	.571	16	–	15	.516
Cal State Bakersfield	8	–	6	.571	12	–	19	.387
UMKC	5	–	9	.357	10	–	18	.357
Seattle	3	–	11	.214	9	–	21	.300
Chicago State	2	–	12	.143	4	–	25	.138
† 2016 WAC tournament winner As of March 18, 2016 * Grand Canyon ineligible for WAC Basketball Tournament as part of reclassification from Division II; Rankings from AP poll

The 2015–16 New Mexico State Aggies women's basketball team represented New Mexico State University during the 2015–16 NCAA Division I women's basketball season. The Aggies, led by sixth year head coach Mark Trakh, played their home games at the Pan American Center and were members of the Western Athletic Conference. They finished the season 26–5, 13–1 in WAC play to win the regular season WAC championship. They defeated Utah Valley and Texas–Rio Grande Valley to be champions of the WAC women's tournament. They received an automatic bid to the NCAA tournament where they lost in the first round to Arizona State.

== Roster ==
2015–16 New Mexico State Aggies women's basketball team
Players
Coaches

Pos.	#	Name	Height	Year	Previous school	Hometown
F	1	Jasmine Cooper	5 ft 11 in (1.8 m)	So	Lincoln HS	Dallas, TX
G	2	Brooke Salas	5 ft 10 in (1.78 m)	Fr	El Dorado HS	Placentia, CA
G	3	Takiyah Lopez	5 ft 8 in (1.73 m)	Fr	Chapin HS	El Paso, TX
G	4	Sasha Weber	6 ft 0 in (1.83 m)	Sr	Timberline HS	Lacey, WA
G	10	Emily Hardin	5 ft 7 in (1.7 m)	So	Monache HS	Porterville, CA
G	11	Shanice Davis	5 ft 6 in (1.68 m)	Sr	Harker Heights HS	Killeen, TX
G	12	Zaire Williams	5 ft 6 in (1.68 m)	So	Santa Margarita Catholic HS	Dana Point, CA
F	20	Brandee Walton	5 ft 11 in (1.8 m)	Jr	St. Mary's HS	Surprise, AZ
G	21	Tamera William	5 ft 9 in (1.75 m)	Jr	Centennial HS	Las Vegas, NV
F	22	Tyler Ellis	6 ft 2 in (1.88 m)	Jr	Antelope HS	Antelope, AZ
G	23	Abby Scott	6 ft 1 in (1.85 m)	Sr	Madras HS	Madras, OR
F	24	Brianna Freeman	6 ft 1 in (1.85 m)	Jr	Harker Heights HS	Killeen, TX
F	33	Jeneva Toilolo	6 ft 3 in (1.91 m)	Fr	Farrington HS	Honolulu, HI
G	35	Moriah Mack	5 ft 8 in (1.73 m)	Jr	Reagan HS	San Antonio, TX
F	50	Tyesha Taylor	6 ft 4 in (1.93 m)	RS Fr	Temple HS	Temple, TX

Head coach

- Mark Trakh (Long Beach State)

Assistant coach(es)

- Tamara Inoue (Long Beach State)
- Aarika Hughes (USC)
- Cecilia Russell-Nava (New Mexico State)

Legend

- (C) Team captain
- (S) Suspended
- (I) Ineligible
- (W) Walk-on
- Injured
- Current redshirt

Roster

== Schedule ==
Date time, TV	Rank^{#}	Opponent^{#}	Result	Record	Site (attendance) city, state
Non-conference regular season
11/13/2015*; 6:00 pm		at North Dakota State	W 79–69	1–0	Bentson Bunker Fieldhouse (587); Fargo, ND
11/17/2015*; 7:00 pm, AggieVision		New Mexico; Rio Grande Rivalry	W 78–59	2–0	Pan American Center (885); Las Cruces, NM
11/19/2015*; 7:00 pm		Sacramento State	W 80–77	3–0	Pan American Center (1,265); Las Cruces, NM
11/24/2015*; 5:00 pm		Southern Utah	W 74–60	4–0	Pan American Center (700); Las Cruces, NM
11/27/2015*; 1:00 pm		Northwestern State; Aggie Hotel Encanto Thanksgiving Classic	W 65–54	5–0	Pan American Center (873); Las Cruces, NM
11/28/2015*; 7:00 pm		Northern Arizona; Aggie Hotel Encanto Thanksgiving Classic	W 87–53	6–0	Pan American Center (946); Las Cruces, NM
12/02/2015*; 7:00 pm		at Arizona	L 64–68	6–1	McKale Center (741); Tucson, AZ
12/05/2015*; 2:00 pm, AggieVision		UTEP; The Battle of I-10	L 65–71	6–2	Pan American Center (768); Las Cruces, NM
12/14/2015*; 7:00 pm		Eastern New Mexico	W 76–61	7–2	Pan American Center (862); Las Cruces, NM
12/17/2015*; 8:00 pm		at San Jose State	W 75–66	8–2	Event Center Arena (224); San Jose, CA
12/20/2015*; 2:00 pm		at New Mexico; Rio Grande Rivalry	W 52–47	9–2	The Pit; Albuquerque, NM
12/29/2015*; 12:00 pm		vs. Vanderbilt; Fordham Holiday Classic semifinals	L 45–71	9–3	Rose Hill Gymnasium (832); Bronx, NY
12/30/2015*; 11:00 am		vs. Texas A&M–Corpus Christi; Fordham Holiday Classic 3rd place game	W 70–51	10–3	Rose Hill Gymnasium; Bronx, NY
01/04/2016*; 7:00 pm		Western New Mexico	W 68–39	11–3	Pan American Center (855); Las Cruces, NM
WAC regular season
01/07/2016; 7:00 pm, AggieVision		Utah Valley	W 73–68	12–3 (1–0)	Pan American Center (815); Las Cruces, NM
01/09/2016; 2:00 pm, AggieVision		Grand Canyon	W 60–58	13–3 (2–0)	Pan American Center (879); Las Cruces, NM
01/14/2016; 6:00 pm		at UMKC	W 68–62	14–3 (3–0)	Swinney Recreation Center (231); Kansas City, MO
01/16/2016; 1:00 pm		at Chicago State	W 70–60	15–3 (4–0)	Emil and Patricia Jones Convocation Center (110); Chicago, IL
01/21/2016; 7:00 pm, AggieVision		Seattle	W 69–54	16–3 (5–0)	Pan American Center (1,070); Las Cruces, NM
01/23/2016; 2:00 pm, AggieVision		Cal State Bakersfield	W 86–63	17–3 (6–0)	Pan American Center (5,034); Las Cruces, NM
01/30/2016; 6:00 pm		at Texas–Rio Grande Valley	W 68–57	18–3 (7–0)	UTRGV Fieldhouse (1,709); Edinburg, TX
02/04/2016; 7:00 pm		at Grand Canyon	W 64–44	19–3 (8–0)	GCU Arena (414); Phoenix, AZ
02/06/2016; 3:00 pm		at Utah Valley	W 59–53	20–3 (9–0)	PE Building (353); Orem, UT
02/13/2016; 2:00 pm		Chicago State	W 76–63	21–3 (10–0)	Pan American Center (1,305); Las Cruces, NM
02/18/2016; 8:00 pm		at Cal State Bakersfield	W 67–59	22–3 (11–0)	Icardo Center (674); Bakersfield, CA
02/20/2016; 8:00 pm, ASN		at Seattle	W 66–56	23–3 (12–0)	Connolly Center (342); Seattle, WA
02/27/2016; 2:00 pm		UMKC	W 78–74 ^{OT}	24–3 (13–0)	Pan American Center (1,142); Las Cruces, NM
03/05/2016; 2:00 pm, ESPN3		Texas–Rio Grande Valley	L 55–66	24–4 (13–1)	Pan American Center (1,618); Las Cruces, NM
WAC Women's Tournament
03/11/2016; 1:00 pm		vs. Utah Valley; Semifinals	W 58–44	25–4	Orleans Arena (1,618); Paradise, NV
03/12/2016; 2:00 pm, ESPNU		vs. Texas–Rio Grande Valley; Championship Game	W 80–53	26–4	Orleans Arena (777); Paradise, NV
NCAA Women's Tournament
03/18/2016*; 5:30 pm, ESPN2		at No. 11 Arizona State; First Round	L 52–74	26–5	Wells Fargo Arena (3,134); Tempe, AZ
*Non-conference game. ^{#}Rankings from AP Poll. (#) Tournament seedings in parentheses. All times are in Mountain Time.

== See also ==
2015–16 New Mexico State Aggies men's basketball team
