= 2015–16 Seattle Redhawks women's basketball team =

Intercollegiate basketball season

2015–16 Seattle Redhawks women's basketball
- Conference: Western Athletic Conference
- Record: 9–21 (3–11 WAC)
- Head coach: Joan Bonvicini (7th season)
- Assistant coaches: Kristen O'Neill Phillips; Sybil Dosty; Vivian Frieson
- Home arena: Connolly Center

2015–16 WAC women's basketball standings
	Conf.				Overall
Team	W		L	PCT	W		L	PCT
New Mexico State †	13	–	1	.929	26	–	5	.839
UTRGV	9	–	5	.643	19	–	14	.576
Grand Canyon*	8	–	6	.571	16	–	15	.516
Utah Valley	8	–	6	.571	16	–	15	.516
Cal State Bakersfield	8	–	6	.571	12	–	19	.387
UMKC	5	–	9	.357	10	–	18	.357
Seattle	3	–	11	.214	9	–	21	.300
Chicago State	2	–	12	.143	4	–	25	.138
† 2016 WAC tournament winner As of March 18, 2016 * Grand Canyon ineligible for WAC Basketball Tournament as part of reclassification from Division II; Rankings from AP poll

The 2015–16 Seattle Redhawks women's basketball team represented Seattle University during the 2015–16 NCAA Division I women's basketball season. The Redhawks, led by seventh-year head coach Joan Bonvicini, played their home games at the Connolly Center and were members of the Western Athletic Conference. They finished the season 9–21, 3–11 in WAC play to finish in eighth place. They lost in the quarterfinals of the WAC women's tournament to Cal State Bakersfield.

== Roster ==
2015–16 Seattle Redhawks women's basketball team
Players
Coaches

Pos.	#	Name	Height	Year	Previous school	Hometown
G	0	Shaylin Heredia	5 ft 7 in (1.7 m)	Jr	Scottsdale CC	Tolleson, AZ
G	2	Kaylee Best	5 ft 8 in (1.73 m)	Jr	Lakeside School	Seattle, WA
G	3	Jacinta Beckley	6 ft 0 in (1.83 m)	So	Paraparaumu College	Wellington, New Zealand
G	4	Masha Shtikel	5 ft 10 in (1.78 m)	Jr	Shorewood	Shoreline, WA
G	5	Crystal Allen	5 ft 8 in (1.73 m)	So	Trimble Tech	Fort Worth, TX
C	11	Kaylee Biddell	6 ft 3 in (1.91 m)	Jr	Mineral Area JC	Port Vincent, Australia
G	15	Tal Sahar	5 ft 11 in (1.8 m)	Fr	Calabasas	Tarzana, CA
G	21	Delanie Parry	5 ft 5 in (1.65 m)	RS So	Westview; Portland State	Beaverton, OR
G	22	Ashlyn Lewey	6 ft 0 in (1.83 m)	So	Mead	Spokane, WA
G	24	Alexis Montgomery	5 ft 10 in (1.78 m)	Jr	Beaverton	Beaverton, OR
F	25	Cydnee Ceballos	6 ft 0 in (1.83 m)	Sr	Shadow Mountain; McCook CC	Phoenix, AZ
C	31	Taelor Ross	6 ft 2 in (1.88 m)	Sr	St. Mary's Academy	Vancouver, WA
G	32	Kristin Stoffel	5 ft 11 in (1.8 m)	Sr	Jackson HS	Mill Creek, WA
F/C	35	Kristin Dearth	6 ft 3 in (1.91 m)	Fr	Cibola	Corrales, NM
F/C	45	Wilma Afungo	6 ft 0 in (1.83 m)	Jr	Plano	Plano, TX

Head coach

- Joan Bonvicini (Southern Connecticut)

Assistant coach(es)

- Kristen O'Neill Phillips(Washington)
- Sybil Dosty (Arizona State)
- Vivian Frieson (Gonzaga)

Legend

- (C) Team captain
- (S) Suspended
- (I) Ineligible
- (W) Walk-on
- Injured
- Current redshirt

Roster

== Schedule ==
Date time, TV	Rank^{#}	Opponent^{#}	Result	Record	Site (attendance) city, state
Non-conference regular season
11/13/2015*; 4:30 pm		Montana State	L 51–80	0–1	KeyArena; Seattle, WA
11/15/2015*; 12:00 pm		at Montana	W 58–44	1–1	Dahlberg Arena (2,462); Missoula, MT
11/18/2015*; 7:00 pm		at Washington	L 55–96	1–2	Alaska Airlines Arena (1,160); Seattle, WA
11/20/2015*; 7:00 pm		Evergreen State	W 81–38	2–2	Bellevue College (125); Bellevue, WA
11/23/2015*; 6:00 pm		Idaho	L 60–64	2–3	Memorial Gym (281); Moscow, ID
11/27/2015*; 3:30 pm		at Loyola Marymount; DoubleTree LA Thanksgiving Classic semifinals	W 78–69	3–3	Gersten Pavilion (523); Los Angeles, CA
11/28/2015*; 3:30 pm		vs. Princeton; DoubleTree LA Thanksgiving Classic championship	L 48–85	3–4	Gersten Pavilion (367); Los Angeles, CA
12/03/2015*; 7:00 pm		Denver	W 59–51	4–4	ShoWare Center (157); Kent, WA
12/05/2015*; 1:00 pm		at Idaho State	L 67–83	4–5	Reed Gym (924); Pocatello, ID
12/15/2015*; 7:00 pm		at Portland State	W 85–64	5–5	Peter Stott Center (286); Portland, OR
12/19/2015*; 2:00 pm		Boise State	L 66–84	5–6	Connolly Center (391); Seattle, WA
12/21/2015*; 6:00 pm		UC Riverside	L 70–92	5–7	Connolly Center (158); Seattle, WA
12/28/2015*; 6:00 pm		at Oregon	L 62–82	5–8	Matthew Knight Arena (1,923); Eugene, OR
12/31/2015*; 2:00 pm		Long Beach State	L 57–69	5–9	Connolly Center (191); Seattle, WA
01/02/2016*; 4:00 pm		at Cal State Northridge	W 62–56	6–9	Matadome (322); Northridge, CA
WAC regular season
01/07/2016; 7:00 pm		UMKC	W 69–63	7–9 (1–0)	Connolly Center (234); Seattle, WA
01/09/2016; 2:00 pm		Chicago State	W 59–45	8–9 (2–0)	Connolly Center (233); Seattle, WA
01/16/2016; 1:00 pm		at Cal State Bakersfield	L 68–76	8–10 (2–1)	Icardo Center (396); Bakersfield, CA
01/21/2016; 6:00 pm		at New Mexico State	L 54–69	8–11 (2–2)	Pan American Center (1,070); Las Cruces, NM
01/23/2016; 5:00 pm		at Texas–Rio Grande Valley	W 74–71	9–11 (3–2)	UTRGV Fieldhouse (1,108); Edinburg, TX
01/28/2016; 7:00 pm		Utah Valley	L 44–61	9–12 (3–3)	Connolly Center (207); Seattle, WA
01/30/2016; 4:00 pm		Grand Canyon	L 54–67	9–13 (3–4)	Connolly Center (547); Seattle, WA
02/04/2016; 5:00 pm		at Chicago State	L 49–57	9–14 (3–5)	Emil and Patricia Jones Convocation Center (208); Chicago, IL
02/06/2016; 11:00 am		at UMKC	L 43–64	9–15 (3–6)	Swinney Recreation Center (248); Kansas City, MO
02/13/2016; 3:00 pm		at Grand Canyon	L 53–60	9–16 (3–7)	GCU Arena (465); Phoenix, AZ
02/18/2016; 7:00 pm		Texas–Rio Grande Valley	L 71–76	9–17 (3–8)	Connolly Center (262); Seattle, WA
02/20/2016; 7:00 pm, ASN		New Mexico State	L 56–66	9–18 (3–9)	Connolly Center (342); Seattle, WA
02/27/2016; 2:00 pm		at Utah Valley	L 48–79	9–19 (3–10)	PE Building (249); Orem, UT
03/05/2016; 2:00 pm		Cal State Bakersfield	L 52–66	9–20 (3–11)	Connolly Center (637); Seattle, WA
WAC Women's Tournament
03/09/2016; 7:00 pm		vs. Cal State Bakersfield; Quarterfinals	L 55–62	9–21	Orleans Arena (894); Paradise, NV
*Non-conference game. ^{#}Rankings from AP Poll. (#) Tournament seedings in parentheses. All times are in Pacific Time.

== See also ==
- 2015–16 Seattle Redhawks men's basketball team
