= 2016–17 New Mexico State Aggies women's basketball team =

Intercollegiate basketball season

2016–17 New Mexico State Aggies women's basketball

WAC Regular Season & Tournament Champions

NCAA Women's Tournament, first round
- Conference: Western Athletic Conference
- Record: 24–7 (14–0 WAC)
- Head coach: Mark Trakh (7th season)
- Assistant coaches: Jason Glover; Ashley Ford; Blanche Alverson
- Home arena: Pan American Center

2016–17 WAC women's basketball standings
	Conf.				Overall
Team	W		L	PCT	W		L	PCT
New Mexico State †	14	–	0	1.000	24	–	7	.774
Cal State Bakersfield	10	–	4	.714	15	–	14	.517
Seattle	10	–	4	.714	15	–	18	.455
UTRGV	8	–	6	.571	19	–	14	.576
Grand Canyon*	7	–	7	.500	15	–	12	.556
UMKC	4	–	10	.286	10	–	19	.345
Utah Valley	3	–	11	.214	9	–	22	.290
Chicago State	0	–	14	.000	0	–	29	.000
† 2017 WAC tournament winner As of March 19, 2017; Rankings from AP poll * Ineligible for WAC Basketball Tournament as part of reclassification from Division II

The 2016–17 New Mexico State Aggies women's basketball team represented New Mexico State University during the 2016–17 NCAA Division I women's basketball season. The Aggies, led by seventh year head coach Mark Trakh, played their home games at the Pan American Center and were members of the Western Athletic Conference. They finished the season 24–7, 14–0 in WAC play to win the regular season WAC championship. They defeated UMKC and Seattle to be champions of the WAC women's tournament. They received an automatic bid to the NCAA tournament where they lost in the first round to Stanford. In that game, the Aggies nearly pulled off the monumental upset, leading 38-31 at halftime. The Cardinal cut the lead to one at the end of the third quarter before taking the lead for good halfway through the fourth.

== Roster ==
2016–17 New Mexico State Aggies women's basketball team
Players
Coaches

Pos.	#	Name	Height	Year	Previous school	Hometown
F	1	Jasmine Cooper	5 ft 11 in (1.8 m)	Jr	Lincoln HS	Dallas, TX
G	2	Brooke Salas	5 ft 10 in (1.78 m)	So	El Dorado HS	Placentia, CA
G	3	Tonishia Childress	5 ft 5 in (1.65 m)	RS Jr	Bishop Gorman HS; Boise State	Las Vegas, NV
G	12	Zaire Williams	5 ft 6 in (1.68 m)	Jr	Santa Margarita Catholic HS	Dana Point, CA
G	14	Takiyah Lopez	5 ft 8 in (1.73 m)	So	Horizon HS	El Paso, TX
F	20	Brandee Walton	5 ft 11 in (1.8 m)	Sr	St. Mary's HS	Surprise, AZ
G	21	Tamera William	5 ft 9 in (1.75 m)	Sr	Centennial HS	Las Vegas, NV
F	22	Tyler Ellis	6 ft 2 in (1.88 m)	Sr	Antelope HS	Antelope, AZ
G	23	Aaliyah Prince	5 ft 8 in (1.73 m)	Fr	Highlands HS	San Antonio, TX
F	24	Brianna Freeman	6 ft 1 in (1.85 m)	Sr	Harker Heights HS	Killeen, TX
F	30	Gia Pack	5 ft 10 in (1.78 m)	Fr	South Mountain HS	Phoenix, AZ
F	33	Jeneva Toilolo	6 ft 3 in (1.91 m)	RS Fr	Farrington HS	Honolulu, HI
G	35	Moriah Mack	5 ft 8 in (1.73 m)	Sr	Reagan HS	San Antonio, TX
F	50	Tyesha Taylor	6 ft 4 in (1.93 m)	RS So	Temple HS	Temple, TX

Head coach

- Mark Trakh (Long Beach State)

Assistant coach(es)

- Jason Glover (Grand Canyon)
- Ashley Ford (Nebraska)
- Blanche Alverson (Auburn)

Legend

- (C) Team captain
- (S) Suspended
- (I) Ineligible
- (W) Walk-on
- Injured
- Current redshirt

Roster

== Schedule ==
Date time, TV	Rank^{#}	Opponent^{#}	Result	Record	Site (attendance) city, state
Non-conference regular season
11/13/2016*; 5:30 pm, AggieVision		San Jose State	W 66–55	1–0	Pan American Center (715); Las Cruces, NM
11/15/2016*; 7:00 pm		at New Mexico; Rio Grande Rivalry	L 55–84	1–1	The Pit (4,724); Albuquerque, NM
11/18/2016*; 7:00 pm		vs. Sacramento State; Bank of Hawaii Classic	W 99–73	2–1	Stan Sheriff Center; Honolulu, HI
11/20/2016*; 8:30 pm		at Hawaii; Bank of Hawaii Classic	L 53–56	2–2	Stan Sheriff Center (2,053); Honolulu, HI
11/23/2016*; 1:00 pm, WAC DN		Pepperdine	W 74–66	3–2	Pan American Center; Las Cruces, NM
11/25/2016*; 5:00 pm		New Mexico Highlands	W 94–37	4–2	Pan American Center (834); Las Cruces, NM
11/30/2016*; 5:30 pm, ESPN3		New Mexico; Rio Grande Rivalry	W 77–70	5–2	Pan American Center (1,171); Las Cruces, NM
12/04/2016*; 1:00 pm, ESPN3		Arizona	L 63–74 ^{OT}	5–3	Pan American Center (912); Las Cruces, NM
12/11/2016*; 12:00 pm, FSAZ		at Northern Arizona	W 79–68	6–3	Rolle Activity Center (218); Flagstaff, AZ
12/15/2016*; 7:05 pm		at UTEP; Battle of I-10	W 67–59	7–3	Don Haskins Center (1,472); El Paso, TX
12/19/2016*; 4:00 pm		vs. Quinnipiac; Play4Kay Shootout quarterfinals	L 46–49	7–4	T-Mobile Arena; Paradise, NV
12/20/2016*; 4:00 pm		vs. UNLV; Play4Kay Shootout consolation 2nd round	L 47–52	7–5	T-Mobile Arena; Paradise, NV
12/21/2016*; 1:30 pm		vs. Santa Clara; Play4Kay Shootout 7th place game	L 46–60	7–6	T-Mobile Arena; Paradise, NV
12/31/2016*; 2:00 pm		Western New Mexico	W 85–28	8–6	Pan American Center (860); Las Cruces, NM
WAC regular season
01/05/2017; 7:00 pm, WAC DN		UMKC	W 78–72	9–6 (1–0)	Pan American Center (844); Las Cruces, NM
01/07/2017; 2:00 pm		Chicago State	W 100–63	10–6 (2–0)	Pan American Center (808); Las Cruces, NM
01/12/2017; 7:00 pm		at Grand Canyon	W 81–65	11–6 (3–0)	GCU Arena (656); Phoenix, AZ
01/14/2017; 1:00 pm		at Cal State Bakersfield	W 64–55	12–6 (4–0)	Icardo Center (567); Bakersfield, CA
01/21/2017; 1:00 pm, WAC DN		at UMKC	W 60–43	13–6 (5–0)	Swinney Recreation Center (1,120); Kansas City, MO
01/26/2017; 7:00 pm, ESPN3		Seattle	W 73–69	14–6 (6–0)	Pan American Center (873); Las Cruces, NM
01/28/2017; 2:00 pm, ESPN3		Utah Valley	W 63–46	15–6 (7–0)	Pan American Center (1,249); Las Cruces, NM
02/04/2017; 12:00 pm, WAC DN		at Chicago State	W 65–54	16–6 (8–0)	Jones Convocation Center (230); Chicago, IL
02/09/2017; 7:00 pm		Cal State Bakersfield	W 69–55	17–6 (9–0)	Pan American Center (1,023); Las Cruces, NM
02/12/2017; 2:00 pm		Grand Canyon	W 67–60	18–6 (10–0)	Pan American Center (1,741); Las Cruces, NM
02/18/2017; 2:00 pm, ESPN3		Texas–Rio Grande Valley	W 87–67	19–6 (11–0)	Pan American Center (1,554); Las Cruces, NM
02/23/2017; 7:00 pm, WAC DN		at Utah Valley	W 66–53	20–6 (12–0)	Lockhart Arena (244); Orem, UT
02/25/2017; 5:00 pm		at Seattle	W 64–61	21–6 (13–0)	Connolly Center (244); Seattle, WA
03/04/2017; 6:00 pm, WAC DN		at Texas–Rio Grande Valley	W 64–46	22–6 (14–0)	UTRGV Fieldhouse (1,022); Edinburg, TX
WAC Women's Tournament
03/10/2017; 1:00 pm, ESPN3	(1)	vs. (5) UMKC; Semifinals	W 71–63	23–6	Orleans Arena; Paradise, NV
03/11/2017; 2:00 pm, ESPN3	(1)	vs. (2) Seattle; Championship Game	W 63–48	24–6	Orleans Arena (851); Paradise, NV
NCAA Women's Tournament
03/18/2017*; 11:30 am, ESPN2	(15 L)	vs. (2 L) No. 6 Stanford; First Round	L 64–72	25–6	Bramlage Coliseum (4,005); Manhattan, KS
*Non-conference game. ^{#}Rankings from AP Poll. (#) Tournament seedings in parentheses. L=Lexington Region. All times are in Mountain Time.

== See also ==
2016–17 New Mexico State Aggies men's basketball team
