= 2015–16 Grand Canyon Antelopes women's basketball team =

American college basketball season

2015–16 Grand Canyon Antelopes women's basketball

WBI, first round
- Conference: Western Athletic Conference
- Record: 16–15 (8–6 WAC)
- Head coach: Trent May (9th season)
- Assistant coaches: Cory Cole; Milee Karee; Krystal Thomas
- Home arena: GCU Arena

2015–16 WAC women's basketball standings
	Conf.				Overall
Team	W		L	PCT	W		L	PCT
New Mexico State †	13	–	1	.929	26	–	5	.839
UTRGV	9	–	5	.643	19	–	14	.576
Grand Canyon*	8	–	6	.571	16	–	15	.516
Utah Valley	8	–	6	.571	16	–	15	.516
Cal State Bakersfield	8	–	6	.571	12	–	19	.387
UMKC	5	–	9	.357	10	–	18	.357
Seattle	3	–	11	.214	9	–	21	.300
Chicago State	2	–	12	.143	4	–	25	.138
† 2016 WAC tournament winner As of March 18, 2016 * Grand Canyon ineligible for WAC Basketball Tournament as part of reclassification from Division II; Rankings from AP poll

The 2015–16 Grand Canyon Antelopes women's basketball team represented Grand Canyon University in Phoenix, Arizona during the 2015–16 NCAA Division I women's basketball season. It was head coach Trent May's ninth season at Grand Canyon. The Antelopes competed as members of the Western Athletic Conference (WAC) and played their home games at GCU Arena. This was year three of a four-year transition period from Division II to Division I. As a result, the Antelopes were not eligible to make the DI or DII basketball tournaments and did not participate in this season's WAC basketball tournament. However, the Antelopes did compete in the WBI, where they lost in the first round to North Dakota. They finished the season 16–15, 8–6 in WAC play, to finish in a three-way tie for third place.

== Roster ==
2015–16 Grand Canyon Antelopes women's basketball team
Players
Coaches

Pos.	#	Name	Height	Year	Previous school	Hometown
G	0	Justine Johnson	5 ft 6 in (1.68 m)	RS Sr	Centennial; Louisiana Tech	Las Vegas, NV
G	2	August Touchard	5 ft 6 in (1.68 m)	Jr	JSerra Catholic	Newport Beach, CA
F	3	Dana Jones	6 ft 1 in (1.85 m)	RS Sr	Gulfport	Gulfport, MS
G	5	Jessica Gajewski	5 ft 11 in (1.8 m)	RS So	Mountain Creek State	Brisbane, Australia
G	10	Alyx Bloom	5 ft 5 in (1.65 m)	Jr	Clay Center; Hutchinson CC	Clay Center, KS
G	11	Casey Rarrick	5 ft 8 in (1.73 m)	So	Saguaro	Scottsdale, AZ
F	12	Cheyenne Hedrington	5 ft 10 in (1.78 m)	Sr	Central; Barton	Champaign, IL
G	23	Devyn Edwards	5 ft 8 in (1.73 m)	Sr	Highland Park; Coffeyville CC	Topeka, KS
F	24	Kiara Clark	5 ft 10 in (1.78 m)	RS So	Centennial; Glendale	Glendale, AZ
C	30	Julieh Clark	6 ft 3 in (1.91 m)	Jr	Sanger; Panola College	Denton, TX
F	32	Tanesha Daniels	6 ft 1 in (1.85 m)	Jr	Fremont; Salt Lake CC	Brigham City, UT
C	42	Katelyn Lee	6 ft 3 in (1.91 m)	RS Fr	Gordon Lee	Chickamauga, GA
G	44	Jaclyn Lanz	5 ft 7 in (1.7 m)	Jr	St. Mary's Academy	Vancouver, WA
F	50	Zelor Massaquoi	5 ft 7 in (1.7 m)	So	Reservoir	Fulton, MD

Head coach

- Trent May (Southern Nazarene)

Assistant coach(es)

- Cory Cole (Oklahoma Christian)
- Milee Karre (Grand Canyon)
- Krystal Thomas (Duke)

Legend

- (C) Team captain
- (S) Suspended
- (I) Ineligible
- (W) Walk-on
- Injured
- Current redshirt

Roster
Last update: April 3, 2025

== Schedule and results ==
Date time, TV	Rank^{#}	Opponent^{#}	Result	Record	Site (attendance) city, state
Non-conference regular season
November 13, 2015*; 2:00 p.m.		Hawaii	L 41–74	0–1	GCU Arena (623); Phoenix, AZ
November 16, 2015*; 7:00 p.m.		Oral Roberts	W 66–64 ^{OT}	1–1	GCU Arena (510); Phoenix, AZ
November 19, 2015*; 10:00 a.m.		Western State	W 77–40	2–1	GCU Arena (1,475); Phoenix, AZ
November 22, 2015*; 5:00 p.m.		vs. USC; Hall of Fame Women's Challenge	L 44–75	2–2	McCarthey Athletic Center (5,509); Spokane, WA
November 23, 2015*; 7:00 p.m.		at Gonzaga; Hall of Fame Women's Challenge	L 44–70	2–3	McCarthey Athletic Center (5,222); Spokane, WA
November 24, 2015*; 9:00 p.m.		vs. West Virginia; Hall of Fame Women's Challenge	L 50–68	2–4	McCarthey Athletic Center (5,154); Spokane, WA
November 29, 2015*; 8:00 a.m., ESPN3		vs. Fairleigh Dickinson; Hall of Fame Women's Challenge	L 68–74	2–5	Mohegan Sun Arena (1,016); Uncasville, CT
December 4, 2015*; 7:00 p.m.		vs. Abilene Christian; Air Force Classic	L 71–75	2–6	Clune Arena (96); Colorado Springs, CO
December 5, 2015*; 4:30 p.m.		at Air Force; Air Force Classic	W 73–39	3–6	Clune Arena (159); Colorado Springs, CO
December 8, 2015*; 6:00 p.m.		at North Dakota State	W 76–67	4–6	Bentson Bunker Fieldhouse (416); Fargo, ND
December 14, 2015*; 8:00 p.m.		at UC Irvine	W 58–53	5–6	Bren Events Center (188); Irvine, CA
December 19, 2015*; 7:00 p.m.		South Alabama	L 56–59	5–7	GCU Arena (462); Phoenix, AZ
December 21, 2015*; 2:00 p.m.		Northern Colorado	W 69–59	6–7	GCU Arena (262); Phoenix, AZ
December 30, 2015*; 4:00 p.m.		San Diego Christian	W 60–40	7–7	GCU Arena (206); Phoenix, AZ
January 2, 2016*; 4:00 p.m., WAC DN		UC Riverside	L 67–85	7–8	GCU Arena (308); Phoenix, AZ
January 4, 2016*; 7:00 p.m.		Arizona Christian	W 87–54	8–8	GCU Arena (302); Phoenix, AZ
WAC regular season
January 7, 2016; 6:00 p.m.		at UTRGV	L 28–52	8–9 (0–1)	UTRGV Fieldhouse (445); Edinburg, TX
January 9, 2016; 2:00 p.m.		at New Mexico State	L 58–60	8–10 (0–2)	Pan American Center (879); Las Cruces, NM
January 16, 2016; 3:00 p.m.		at Utah Valley	W 61–53	9–10 (1–2)	PE Building (201); Orem, UT
January 21, 2016; 7:00 p.m., Cox7		Chicago State	W 74–36	10–10 (2–2)	GCU Arena (465); Phoenix, AZ
January 24, 2016; 2:00 p.m.		UMKC	L 57–63	10–11 (2–3)	GCU Arena (217); Phoenix, AZ
January 28, 2016; 8:00 p.m.		at Cal State Bakersfield	W 61–51	11–11 (3–3)	Icardo Center (544); Bakersfield, CA
January 30, 2016; 5:00 p.m.		at Seattle	W 67–54	12–11 (4–3)	Connolly Center (547); Seattle, WA
February 4, 2016; 7:00 p.m.		New Mexico State	L 44–64	12–12 (4–4)	GCU Arena (414); Phoenix, AZ
February 6, 2016; 4:00 p.m., Cox7		UTRGV	L 66–68	12–13 (4–5)	GCU Arena (376); Phoenix, AZ
February 13, 2016; 4:00 p.m., Cox7		Seattle	W 60–53	13–13 (5–5)	GCU Arena (465); Phoenix, AZ
February 18, 2016; 6:00 p.m.		at UMKC	W 68–59	14–13 (6–5)	Swinney Recreation Center (365); Kansas City, MO
February 20, 2016; 1:00 p.m.		at Chicago State	W 65–60	15–13 (7–5)	Emil and Patricia Jones Convocation Center (213); Chicago, IL
February 25, 2016; 7:00 p.m.		Cal State Bakersfield	L 67–76	15–14 (7–6)	GCU Arena (298); Phoenix, AZ
March 5, 2016; 4:00 p.m.		Utah Valley	W 65–64	16–14 (8–6)	GCU Arena (362); Phoenix, AZ
WBI
March 17, 2016*; 5:00 p.m.		at North Dakota; First round	L 51–57	16–15	Betty Engelstad Sioux Center (645); Grand Forks, ND
*Non-conference game. ^{#}Rankings from AP poll. (#) Tournament seedings in parentheses. All times are in Mountain.

== See also ==
- 2015–16 Grand Canyon Antelopes men's basketball team
