= 2015–16 Utah Valley Wolverines women's basketball team =

Intercollegiate basketball season

2015–16 Utah Valley Wolverines women's basketball
- Conference: Western Athletic Conference
- Record: 16–15 (8–6 WAC)
- Head coach: Cathy Nixon (20th season)
- Assistant coaches: Jason Glover; Adam Wardenburg; Caitlyn Sears
- Home arena: UCCU Center; PE Building

2015–16 WAC women's basketball standings
	Conf.				Overall
Team	W		L	PCT	W		L	PCT
New Mexico State †	13	–	1	.929	26	–	5	.839
UTRGV	9	–	5	.643	19	–	14	.576
Grand Canyon*	8	–	6	.571	16	–	15	.516
Utah Valley	8	–	6	.571	16	–	15	.516
Cal State Bakersfield	8	–	6	.571	12	–	19	.387
UMKC	5	–	9	.357	10	–	18	.357
Seattle	3	–	11	.214	9	–	21	.300
Chicago State	2	–	12	.143	4	–	25	.138
† 2016 WAC tournament winner As of March 18, 2016 * Grand Canyon ineligible for WAC Basketball Tournament as part of reclassification from Division II; Rankings from AP poll

The 2015–16 Utah Valley Wolverines women's basketball team represented Utah Valley University in the 2015–16 college basketball season. Cathy Nixon entered the season as head coach for the 20th consecutive season. The Wolverines played their home games at the UCCU Center and the PE Building as members of the WAC. They finished the season 16–15, 8–6 in WAC play to finish in a 3 tie for third place. They advanced to the semifinals of the WAC women's tournament, where they lost to New Mexico State.

== Roster ==
2015–16 Utah Valley Wolverines women's basketball team
Players
Coaches

Pos.	#	Name	Height	Year	Previous school	Hometown
G	3	Mariah Seals	5 ft 3 in (1.6 m)	So	Miramonte	Richmond, CA
G	5	Georgia Agnew	5 ft 9 in (1.75 m)	Jr	Salem Hills	Hamilton, New Zealand
G	11	Quynne Huggins	6 ft 0 in (1.83 m)	Fr	Millennium	Goodyear, AZ
F	12	Rebecca MaWhinney	6 ft 1 in (1.85 m)	Jr	Wasatch	Midway, UT
F	13	Karlee Norris	6 ft 0 in (1.83 m)	RS Jr	Mountain Crest	Hyrum, UT
G	14	Kendall Perry	5 ft 6 in (1.68 m)	Fr	Highland	Gilbert, AZ
G	20	Patrice Toston	5 ft 7 in (1.7 m)	Sr	Franklin; Southern Idaho	Seattle, WA
G	21	Rhiah Spooner-Knight	5 ft 10 in (1.78 m)	Jr	Sacred Heart Girls' College	Hamilton, New Zealand
G	22	Taylor Gordon	5 ft 8 in (1.73 m)	So	North Sanpete	Mount Pleasant, UT
G/F	23	Kelsey McCann	6 ft 0 in (1.83 m)	Fr	Lone Peak	Highland, UT
G	25	Veronica Preciado	5 ft 7 in (1.7 m)	Fr	Grant Union	Sacramento, CA
G	35	Deijah Blanks	5 ft 9 in (1.75 m)	So	Mount Miguel	San Diego, CA
C	40	Sam Loggins	6 ft 5 in (1.96 m)	Sr	Mountain View	Boise, ID
C	44	Hadley Nelson	6 ft 5 in (1.96 m)	Fr	Highland	Gilbert, AZ

Head coach

- Cathy Nixon (BYU)

Assistant coach(es)

- Jason Glover (Grand Canyon)
- Adam Wardenburg (Utah State)
- Caitlyn Sears (Southern Utah)

Legend

- (C) Team captain
- (S) Suspended
- (I) Ineligible
- (W) Walk-on
- Injured
- Current redshirt

== Schedule and results ==
Date time, TV	Rank^{#}	Opponent^{#}	Result	Record	Site (attendance) city, state
Exhibition
11/07/2015*; 3:00 pm		CSU Pueblo	L 53–67		PE Building; Orem, UT
Non-conference regular season
11/13/2015*; 3:00 pm, BYUtv		at BYU	L 62–78	0–1	Marriott Center (898); Provo, UT
11/14/2015*; 4:00 pm		Bethesda University	W 91–64	1–1	UCCU Center (202); Orem, UT
11/17/2015*; 7:00 pm		Southern Utah	W 70–58	2–1	UCCU Center (389); Orem, UT
11/19/2015*; 7:00 pm		at Boise State	W 72–70	3–1	Taco Bell Arena (504); Boise, ID
11/21/2015*; 3:00 pm		Dixie State	W 77–63	4–1	PE Building (314); Orem, UT
11/23/2015*; 7:00 pm		San Francisco	W 94–88 ^{OT}	5–1	UCCU Center (241); Orem, UT
11/27/2015*; 5:00 pm		at Nevada; Nugget Classic	W 73–65	6–1	Lawlor Events Center (1,857); Reno, NV
11/28/2015*; 3:00 pm		vs. Alabama; Nugget Classic	L 60–67	6–2	Lawlor Events Center (964); Reno, NV
12/03/2015*; 7:00 pm		at Eastern Washington	L 64–68	6–3	Reese Court (154); Cheney, WA
12/05/2015*; 5:00 pm		at Oregon	L 68–79	6–4	Matthew Knight Arena (1,033); Eugene, OR
12/10/2015*; 7:00 pm		Utah State	L 72–76	6–5	PE Building (323); Orem, UT
12/12/2015*; 2:00 pm		at Weber State	L 54–61	6–6	Dee Events Center (783); Ogden, UT
12/22/2015*; 1:00 pm		at Nebraska–Omaha	W 74–59	7–6	Baxter Arena (268); Omaha, NE
12/29/2015*; 3:00 pm		Idaho State	L 47–56	7–7	UCCU Center (209); Orem, UT
12/31/2015*; 3:00 pm		UC Davis	L 55–59	7–8	PE Building (184); Orem, UT
WAC regular season
01/07/2016; 7:00 pm		at New Mexico State	L 68–73	7–9 (0–1)	Pan American Center (815); Las Cruces, NM
01/09/2016; 7:00 pm		at Texas–Rio Grande Valley	L 48–61	7–10 (0–2)	UTRGV Fieldhouse (611); Edinburg, TX
01/16/2016; 3:00 pm		Grand Canyon	L 53–61	7–11 (0–3)	PE Building (201); Orem, UT
01/21/2016; 5:00 pm		UMKC	W 79–71	8–11 (1–3)	UCCU Center (222); Orem, UT
01/23/2016; 3:00 pm		Chicago State	W 74–46	9–11 (2–3)	UCCU Center (235); Orem, UT
01/28/2016; 8:00 pm		at Seattle	W 61–44	10–11 (3–3)	Connolly Center (207); Seattle, WA
01/30/2016; 2:00 pm		at Cal State Bakersfield	L 54–61	10–12 (4–3)	Icardo Center (822); Bakersfield, CA
02/04/2016; 11:00 am		Texas–Rio Grande Valley	W 71–57	11–12 (4–4)	PE Building (1,389); Orem, UT
02/06/2016; 3:00 pm		New Mexico State	L 53–59	11–13 (4–5)	PE Building (353); Orem, UT
02/13/2016; 3:00 pm		Cal State Bakersfield	W 72–53	12–13 (5–5)	PE Building (276); Orem, UT
02/18/2016; 6:00 pm		at Chicago State	W 69–62	13–13 (6–5)	Emil and Patricia Jones Convocation Center (223); Chicago, IL
02/20/2016; 1:00 pm		at UMKC	W 58–44	14–13 (7–5)	Swinney Recreation Center (411); Kansas City, MO
02/27/2016; 3:00 pm		Seattle	W 79–48	15–13 (8–5)	PE Building (249); Orem, UT
03/05/2016; 4:00 pm		at Grand Canyon	L 64–65	15–14 (8–6)	GCU Arena (362); Phoenix, AZ
WAC Women's Tournament
03/09/2016; 3:00 pm		vs. UMKC; Quarterfinals	W 61–53	16–14	Orleans Arena; Paradise, NV
03/11/2016; 1:00 pm		vs. New Mexico State; Semifinals	L 44–58	16–15	Orleans Arena (1,618); Paradise, NV
*Non-conference game. ^{#}Rankings from AP Poll. (#) Tournament seedings in parentheses.

== See also ==
2015–16 Utah Valley Wolverines men's basketball team
