= 2008 Seattle Storm season =

- Head coach: Brian Agler
- Arena: KeyArena

Results
- Record: 22–12 (.647)
- Place: 2nd (Western)
- Playoff finish: Lost Western Conference Semifinals (2-1) to Los Angeles Sparks

The 2008 WNBA season was the ninth season for the Seattle Storm. The Storm qualified for the postseason for the fifth consecutive season. Sue Bird was a key contributor to the club, averaging 14.1 points per game, and 5.1 assists per game. With the departure of the Seattle SuperSonics NBA franchise to Oklahoma City, the Storm were forced to look for 30 people in positions in marketing, public relations and corporate and ticket sales. The Storm had a shared services agreement with the Sonics, and the departure left the Storm with many positions vacant. By season's end, the Storm were in negotiations with the city of Seattle in hopes of a long-term lease at KeyArena.

== Offseason ==
On November 30, 2007, the Storm announced the resignation of head coach, Anne Donovan. Her replacement, Brian Agler, was named on January 9, 2008

The following player was selected in the Expansion Draft:

- Betty Lennox was selected in the 2008 Expansion Draft for the Atlanta Dream.
- Also acquired the fourth pick in the 2008 WNBA draft and Roneeka Hodges from the Atlanta Dream for Iziane Castro Marques and the eighth pick in the draft.

=== WNBA draft ===
Round	Pick	Player	Nationality	School
2	22	Allie Quigley	United States	DePaul
3	36	Kimberly Beck	United States	George Washington

== Transactions ==
=== Trades ===
February 6, 2008	To Seattle Storm Roneeka Hodges and the 4th pick in the 2008 WNBA draft	To Atlanta Dream Iziane Castro Marques and the 8th pick in the 2008 WNBA draft (Tamera Young)
February 19, 2008	To Seattle Storm Swin Cash	To Detroit Shock No. 4 pick in the 2008 WNBA draft (Alexis Hornbuckle)
June 22, 2008	To Seattle Storm Camille Little	To Atlanta Dream Second-round pick in the 2009 WNBA draft

=== Free agents ===
Player	Signed	Former team
Sheryl Swoopes	March 3, 2008	Houston Comets
Yolanda Griffith	April 8, 2008	Sacramento Monarchs

Player	Left	New team
Roneeka Hodges	May 14, 2008	Houston Comets (July 5, 2008)

Player	Re-signed
Shyra Ely	March 6, 2008
Sue Bird	March 14, 2008
Janell Burse	April 14, 2008
Ashley Robinson	April 18, 2008

== Regular season ==
=== Season standings ===
Western Conference	W	L	PCT	GB	Home	Road	Conf.
San Antonio Silver Stars ^{x}	24	10	.706	–	15–2	9–8	10–10
Seattle Storm ^{x}	22	12	.647	2.0	16–1	6–11	13–7
Los Angeles Sparks ^{x}	20	14	.588	4.0	12–5	8–9	12–8
Sacramento Monarchs ^{x}	18	16	.529	6.0	5–12	13–4	9–11
Houston Comets ^{o}	17	17	.500	7.0	13–4	4–13	10–10
Minnesota Lynx ^{o}	16	18	.471	8.0	10–7	6–11	8–12
Phoenix Mercury ^{o}	16	18	.471	8.0	9–8	7–10	8–12

=== Season schedule ===
Date	Opponent	Score	Leading Scorer	Attendance	Record
May 17	vs. Chicago	67-61	Lauren Jackson (14)	12,079	1-0
May 20	vs. Sacramento	74-62	Lauren Jackson (17); Sue Bird (17); Swin Cash (17)	6,871	2-0
May 22	@ Phoenix	87-83	Lauren Jackson (30)	7,059	3-0
May 24	@ San Antonio	72-87	Swin Cash (15)	9,767	3-1
May 30	vs. San Antonio	78-57	Lauren Jackson (28)	6,810	4-1
June 1	vs. Houston	64-63	Swin Cash (19)	6,116	5-1
June 3	@ New York	63-77	Lauren Jackson (19)	6,928	5-2
June 4	@ Detroit	67-77	Lauren Jackson (27)	8,108	5-3
June 7	vs. Detroit	75-67	Lauren Jackson (24)	7,105	6-3
June 11	vs. Phoenix	83-77	Lauren Jackson (20)	7,483	7-3
June 13	@ San Antonio	69-74	Sue Bird (21)	6,478	7-4
June 13	@ Houston	60-68	Lauren Jackson (18)	7,023	7-5
June 16	vs. Connecticut	67-74	Lauren Jackson (26)	6,872	7-6
June 20	vs. Indiana	78-70	Lauren Jackson (18)	7,393	8-6
June 24	@ Los Angeles	62-76	Sue Bird (11)	8,032	8-7
June 29	vs. Washington	64-49	Sue Bird (14)	7,965	9-7
July 3	vs. New York	84-71	Lauren Jackson (33)	6,973	10-7
July 5	vs. Minnesota	96-71	Lauren Jackson (34)	7,553	11-7
July 8	@ Sacramento	79-64	Lauren Jackson (17)	5,727	12-7
July 10	vs. Phoenix	89-78	Lauren Jackson (25)	10,454	13-7
July 12	vs. Los Angeles	70-52	Sue Bird (18)	10,833	14-7
July 18	@ Indiana	65-59	Sheryl Swoopes (15)	7,450	15-7
July 20	@ Washington	57-89	Katie Gearlds (13)	8,543	15-8
July 22	@ Minnesota	76-73	Sue Bird (22)	12,276	16-8
July 25	@ Phoenix	80-94	Yolanda Griffith (17)	8,323	16-9
July 27	vs. Sacramento	77-71	Sue Bird (24)	8,651	17-9
August 28	vs. Houston	66-49	Sue Bird (22)	8,320	18-9
August 31	@ Connecticut	76-80	Sue Bird (24)	9,518	18-10
September 2	@ Atlanta	83-69	Sue Bird (21)	7,390	19-10
September 4	@ Chicago	70-62	Sue Bird (19)	3,829	20-10
September 6	vs. Minnesota	96-88	Sue Bird (23)	9,339	21-10
September 9	@ Sacramento	74-77	Tanisha Wright (17); Katie Gearlds (17)	11,644	21-11
September 12	vs. Atlanta	77-72	Camille Little (21)	9,686	22-11
September 14	@ Los Angeles	48-65	Shyra Ely (16)	13,142	22-12

== WNBA Playoffs ==
Date	Opponent	Score	Leading Scorer	Attendance	Record
Western Conference Semifinals
September 19	@ Los Angeles	69–77	Sue Bird (23)	9,601	0–1
September 21	Los Angeles	64–50	Sue Bird (20)	8,230	1–1
September 23	Los Angeles	64–71	Tanisha Wright (20)	7,805	1–2

== Player stats ==
Legend
GP	Games played	GS	Games started	MPG	Minutes per game
FG%	Field-goal percentage	3P%	3-point field-goal percentage	FT%	Free-throw percentage
RPG	Rebounds per game	APG	Assists per game	SPG	Steals per game
BPG	Blocks per game	PPG	Points per game

=== Regular season ===
Player	GP	GS	MPG	FG%	3P%	FT%	RPG	APG	SPG	BPG	PPG
Lauren Jackson	21	21	33.0	.452	.295	.934	7.0	1.2	1.5	1.6	20.2
Sue Bird	33	33	33.7	.441	.343	.871	2.5	5.1	1.1	0.1	14.1
Swin Cash	31	28	29.9	.389	.125	.772	5.4	1.9	0.7	1.0	11.3
Camille Little	19	13	23.3	.532	.333	.667	4.4	1.4	1.0	0.3	9.7
Tanisha Wright	34	14	23.8	.432	.167	.787	3.4	2.5	0.9	0.2	7.9
Yolanda Griffith	30	30	21.9	.462	.000	.648	6.3	1.5	1.4	0.6	7.2
Sheryl Swoopes	29	25	24.3	.391	.222	.695	4.3	2.1	1.5	0.3	7.1
Katie Gearlds	34	3	13.8	.373	.391	.739	1.3	0.6	0.3	0.1	5.0
Shyra Ely	34	1	11.4	.409	.364	.625	2.6	0.5	0.4	0.2	3.3
Kelly Santos	22	1	6.1	.390	.000	.652	1.3	0.2	0.2	0.1	2.1
Kimberly Beck	17	0	5.5	.444	.667	.833	0.7	0.4	0.2	0.1	1.0
Ashley Robinson	33	1	10.0	.302	.000	.300	2.2	0.4	0.4	0.6	0.9
Kristen O'Neill	11	0	2.8	.000	.000	.000	0.3	0.1	0.0	0.0	0.0
Florina Pascalau	3	0	3.0	.000	.000	.000	0.3	0.0	0.0	0.0	0.0

Seattle Storm Regular Season Stats

=== Postseason ===
Player	GP	GS	MPG	FG%	3P%	FT%	RPG	APG	SPG	BPG	PPG
Sue Bird	3	3	37.0	.460	.294	1.000	2.3	3.0	1.3	0.0	19.7
Tanisha Wright	3	3	34.3	.412	.500	.750	5.7	2.7	2.0	0.0	13.7
Camille Little	3	3	35.0	.333	.500	.833	3.3	0.3	1.0	0.0	11.7
Sheryl Swoopes	3	2	24.0	.320	.200	.889	3.3	1.0	2.0	0.0	8.7
Yolanda Griffith	3	3	29.0	.214	.000	.875	6.3	1.7	3.0	1.3	4.3
Swin Cash	3	0	14.7	.333	.000	.000	3.7	0.7	0.3	0.7	2.7
Ashley Robinson	3	1	15.3	.500	.000	.500	4.0	0.7	0.3	0.7	2.3
Katie Gearlds	3	0	7.0	.333	.250	.500	0.3	0.7	1.0	0.0	2.0
Kelly Santos	2	0	1.0	.500	.000	.000	0.0	0.0	0.0	0.0	1.0
Shyra Ely	2	0	1.0	.000	.000	.000	0.0	0.0	0.0	0.0	0.0
Kimberly Beck	2	0	2.5	.000	.000	.000	0.0	0.0	0.0	0.0	0.0

Seattle Storm Playoff Stats

== Roster ==
2008 Seattle Storm roster
Players
Coaches

Pos.	No.	Nat.	Name	Height	Weight	From
SG	8	(United States)	Beck, Kimberly	5' 8" (1.73m)	125 lb (57kg)	George Washington
PG	10	(United States)	Bird, Sue	5' 9" (1.75m)	150 lb (68kg)	Connecticut
SF	2	(United States)	Cash, Swin	6' 1" (1.85m)	162 lb (73kg)	Connecticut
SF	0	(United States)	Ely, Shyra	6' 2" (1.88m)	182 lb (83kg)	Tennessee
G/F	4	(United States)	Gearlds, Katie	6' 1" (1.85m)	184 lb (83kg)	Purdue
F/C	13	(United States)	Griffith, Yolanda	6' 3" (1.91m)	188 lb (85kg)	Florida Atlantic
F/C	15	(Australia)	Jackson, Lauren	6' 5" (1.96m)	187 lb (85kg)	Australia
PF	20	(United States)	Little, Camille	6' 2" (1.88m)	180 lb (82kg)	North Carolina
G/F	32	(United States)	O'Neill, Kristen	6' 1" (1.85m)	158 lb (72kg)	Washington
C	43	(United States)	Robinson, Ashley	6' 4" (1.93m)	180 lb (82kg)	Tennessee
PF	9	(Brazil)	Santos, Kelly	6' 3" (1.91m)	188 lb (85kg)	Brazil
G/F	22	(United States)	Swoopes, Sheryl	6' 0" (1.83m)	145 lb (66kg)	Texas Tech
PG	30	(United States)	Wright, Tanisha	5' 11" (1.8m)	165 lb (75kg)	Penn State

Head coach
(United States) Brian Agler (Wittenberg)
Assistant coaches
(United States) Shelley Patterson (Washington State)
(United States) Nancy Darsch (Springfield)

Legend

- (C) Team captain
- (DP) Unsigned draft pick
- (FA) Free agent
- (S) Suspended
- Injured

WNBA roster page

== Awards and honors ==
- Lauren Jackson, WNBA Player of the Week (June 30 - July 6)
- Lauren Jackson, ESPY Award for Best WNBA Player
- Lauren Jackson, WNBA All-Defensive Second Team (Forward)
- Sue Bird, All-WNBA Second Team (Guard)
- Lauren Jackson, All-WNBA Second Team (Forward)
