= 2015–16 Chicago State Cougars women's basketball team =

Intercollegiate basketball season

2015–16 Chicago State Cougars women's basketball
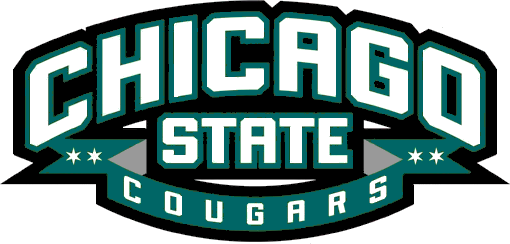
- Conference: Western Athletic Conference
- Record: 4–25 (2–12 WAC)
- Head coach: Angela Jackson (13th season)
- Assistant coaches: Gloria Bradley; Renada Blackburn
- Home arena: Emil and Patricia Jones Convocation Center

2015–16 WAC women's basketball standings
	Conf.				Overall
Team	W		L	PCT	W		L	PCT
New Mexico State †	13	–	1	.929	26	–	5	.839
UTRGV	9	–	5	.643	19	–	14	.576
Grand Canyon*	8	–	6	.571	16	–	15	.516
Utah Valley	8	–	6	.571	16	–	15	.516
Cal State Bakersfield	8	–	6	.571	12	–	19	.387
UMKC	5	–	9	.357	10	–	18	.357
Seattle	3	–	11	.214	9	–	21	.300
Chicago State	2	–	12	.143	4	–	25	.138
† 2016 WAC tournament winner As of March 18, 2016 * Grand Canyon ineligible for WAC Basketball Tournament as part of reclassification from Division II; Rankings from AP poll

The 2015–16 Chicago State Cougars women's basketball team represented Chicago State University during the 2015–16 college basketball season. The Cougars, led by thirteenth year head coach Angela Jackson, played their home games at the Emil and Patricia Jones Convocation Center as members of the Western Athletic Conference. They finished the season 4–25, 2–12 in WAC play to finish in last place. They lost in the quarterfinals of the WAC women's tournament to Texas–Rio Grande Valley.

== Roster ==
2015–16 Chicago State Cougars women's basketball team
Players
Coaches

Pos.	#	Name	Height	Year	Previous school	Hometown
G/F	10	Kaylee Allen	5 ft 9 in (1.75 m)	Fr	Winton Woods	Cincinnati, OH
G	11	Konner Harris	5 ft 9 in (1.75 m)	Jr	Sidney	Sidney, OH
G	12	Tiana Thomas	5 ft 7 in (1.7 m)	Fr	Hononegah	Rockton, IL
F/C	14	Sh'Toya Sanders	6 ft 2 in (1.88 m)	Fr	Wayne	Fort Wayne, IN
G	15	Nadia Miller	5 ft 9 in (1.75 m)	Fr	North Lawndale	Chicago, IL
G	20	Cailin Nix	5 ft 9 in (1.75 m)	Jr	Martinsville	Martinsville, IN
G	21	Jasmine Sanders	5 ft 4 in (1.63 m)	Sr	Hillcrest	Country Club Hills, IL
F	25	Layne Murphy	6 ft 2 in (1.88 m)	Sr	Rich Central	Country Club Hills, IL
G	30	Jessica Cerda	5 ft 10 in (1.78 m)	RS So	Streamwood	Streamwood, IL
F	33	Jasmine Wood	6 ft 0 in (1.83 m)	Sr	Waverly; Akron	Lansing, MI
F/C	50	Rachael Browne	6 ft 2 in (1.88 m)	Fr	Lincoln	Gahanna, OH

Head coach

- Angela Jackson (Old Dominion)

Assistant coach(es)

- Gloria Bradley (Seton Hall)
- Renada Blackburn (Chicago State)

Legend

- (C) Team captain
- (S) Suspended
- (I) Ineligible
- (W) Walk-on
- Injured
- Current redshirt

Roster

== Schedule and results ==
Date time, TV	Rank^{#}	Opponent^{#}	Result	Record	Site (attendance) city, state
Non-conference regular season
11/13/2015*; 7:00 pm		at Illinois	L 36–65	0–1	Parkland College (1,001); Champaign, IL
11/16/2015*; 7:00 pm		UIC	L 47–51 ^{OT}	0–2	Emil and Patricia Jones Convocation Center (350); Chicago, IL
11/18/2015*; 6:00 pm		at Western Michigan	L 56–65	0–3	University Arena (555); Kalamazoo, MI
11/21/2015*; 7:00 pm		at Western Illinois	L 50–88	0–4	Western Hall (543); Macomb, IL
11/24/2015*; 7:00 pm		at DePaul	L 42–88	0–5	McGrath-Phillips Arena (1,989); Chicago, IL
11/28/2015*; 2:00 pm		Morehead State	W 75–71	1–5	Emil and Patricia Jones Convocation Center (110); Chicago, IL
12/02/2015*; 7:00 pm		Bradley	L 60–66	1–6	Emil and Patricia Jones Convocation Center (225); Chicago, IL
12/05/2015*; 2:00 pm		Kansas State	L 54–63	1–7	Emil and Patricia Jones Convocation Center (417); Chicago, IL
12/12/2015*; 11:00 am		at IPFW	L 51–62	1–8	Hilliard Gates Sports Center (410); Fort Wayne, IN
12/15/2015*; 5:30 pm		at Jackson State	W 76–59	2–8	Williams Assembly Center (329); Jackson, MS
12/19/2015*; 2:00 pm		Oakland	L 51–74	2–9	Emil and Patricia Jones Convocation Center (212); Chicago, IL
12/21/2015*; 7:00 pm, ESPN3		at Illinois State	L 53–57	2–10	Redbird Arena (734); Normal, IL
12/30/2015*; 7:00 pm		Northern Illinois	L 50–68	2–11	Emil and Patricia Jones Convocation Center (415); Chicago, IL
01/03/2016*; 2:00 pm		Milwaukee	L 48–55	2–12	Emil and Patricia Jones Convocation Center (215); Chicago, IL
WAC regular season
01/07/2016; 9:00 pm		at Cal State Bakersfield	L 43–76	2–13 (0–1)	Icardo Center (680); Bakersfield, CA
01/09/2016; 4:00 pm		at Seattle	L 45–59	2–14 (0–2)	Connolly Center (233); Seattle, WA
01/14/2016; 7:00 pm		Texas–Rio Grande Valley	L 56–64	2–15 (0–3)	Emil and Patricia Jones Convocation Center (100); Chicago, IL
01/16/2016; 1:00 pm		New Mexico State	L 60–70	2–16 (0–4)	Emil and Patricia Jones Convocation Center (110); Chicago, IL
01/21/2016; 8:00 pm		at Grand Canyon	L 36–74	2–17 (0–5)	GCU Arena (465); Phoenix, AZ
01/23/2016; 4:00 pm		at Utah Valley	L 46–74	2–18 (0–6)	UCCU Center (235); Orem, UT
01/30/2016; 2:00 pm		UMKC	W 77–72 ^{OT}	3–18 (1–6)	Emil and Patricia Jones Convocation Center (231); Chicago, IL
02/04/2016; 7:00 pm		Seattle	W 57–49	4–18 (2–6)	Emil and Patricia Jones Convocation Center (208); Chicago, IL
02/06/2016; 2:00 pm		Cal State Bakersfield	L 61–74	4–19 (2–7)	Emil and Patricia Jones Convocation Center (115); Chicago, IL
02/13/2016; 3:00 pm		at New Mexico State	L 63–76	4–20 (2–8)	Pan American Center (1,305); Las Cruces, NM
02/18/2016; 7:00 pm		Utah Valley	L 62–69	4–21 (2–9)	Emil and Patricia Jones Convocation Center (223); Chicago, IL
02/20/2016; 2:00 pm		Grand Canyon	L 60–65	4–22 (2–10)	Emil and Patricia Jones Convocation Center (213); Chicago, IL
02/27/2016; 7:00 pm		at Texas–Rio Grande Valley	L 56–78	4–23 (2–11)	UTRGV Fieldhouse (522); Edinburg, TX
03/05/2016; 2:00 pm		at UMKC	L 50–67	4–24 (2–12)	Swinney Recreation Center (472); Kansas City, MO
WAC Women's Tournament
03/09/2016; 6:30 pm		vs. Texas–Rio Grande Valley; Quarterfinals	L 52–60	4–25	Orleans Arena; Paradise, NV
*Non-conference game. ^{#}Rankings from AP Poll. (#) Tournament seedings in parentheses. All times are in Central.

== See also ==
2015–16 Chicago State Cougars men's basketball team
