= 2015–16 Cal State Bakersfield Roadrunners women's basketball team =

Intercollegiate basketball season

2015–16 Cal State Bakersfield Roadrunners women's basketball
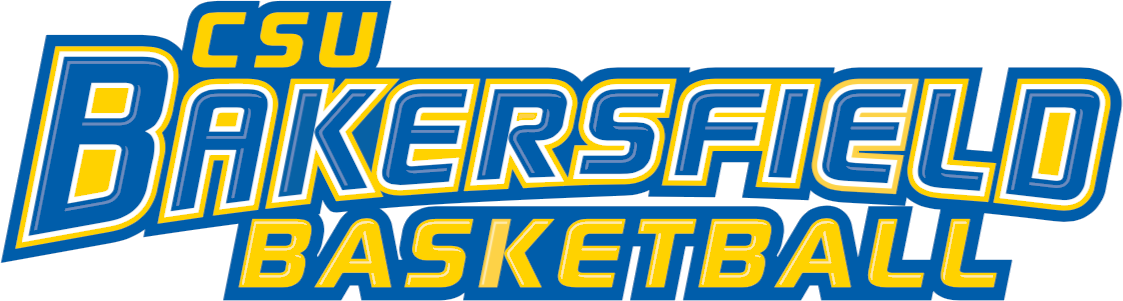
- Conference: Western Athletic Conference
- Record: 12–19 (8–6 WAC)
- Head coach: Greg McCall (5th season)
- Assistant coaches: Xavier Johnson; Nikki Blue; Zack Grasmick
- Home arena: Icardo Center

2015–16 WAC women's basketball standings
	Conf.				Overall
Team	W		L	PCT	W		L	PCT
New Mexico State †	13	–	1	.929	26	–	5	.839
UTRGV	9	–	5	.643	19	–	14	.576
Grand Canyon*	8	–	6	.571	16	–	15	.516
Utah Valley	8	–	6	.571	16	–	15	.516
Cal State Bakersfield	8	–	6	.571	12	–	19	.387
UMKC	5	–	9	.357	10	–	18	.357
Seattle	3	–	11	.214	9	–	21	.300
Chicago State	2	–	12	.143	4	–	25	.138
† 2016 WAC tournament winner As of March 18, 2016 * Grand Canyon ineligible for WAC Basketball Tournament as part of reclassification from Division II; Rankings from AP poll

The 2015–16 Cal State Bakersfield Roadrunners women's basketball team represented California State University, Bakersfield during the 2015–16 NCAA Division I women's basketball season. The Roadrunners, led by fifth year head coach Greg McCall, play their home games at the Icardo Center and were members of the Western Athletic Conference. They finished the season 12–19, 8–6 in WAC play to finish in a 3 tie for third place. They advanced to the semifinals of the WAC women's tournament where they lost to Texas–Rio Grande Valley.

== Roster ==
2015–16 Cal State Bakersfield Roadrunners women's basketball team
Players
Coaches

Pos.	#	Name	Height	Year	Previous school	Hometown
G	0	Jerice Fears	5 ft 9 in (1.75 m)	Fr	Bryan Adams HS	Dallas, TX
G	1	Alyssa Shannon	5 ft 2 in (1.57 m)	Sr	Stockdale HS	Bakersfield, CA
C	2	Brittany Sims	6 ft 3 in (1.91 m)	Jr	Edison HS	Fresno, CA
G	3	Jamee Denman	5 ft 10 in (1.78 m)	Fr	Bogan HS	Chicago, IL
G	4	Heidi Torres-Rodriguez	5 ft 10 in (1.78 m)	RS Fr	James Lick HS; USC	San Jose, CA
F/C	10	Keri Kleist	6 ft 4 in (1.93 m)	RS Jr	Sycamore HS; Moberly Area CC	Cincinnati, OH
G	11	Addi Walters	5 ft 9 in (1.75 m)	Fr	St. Ignatius College Prep	San Francisco, CA
G	12	Alexxus Gilbert	5 ft 7 in (1.7 m)	Fr	Bryan Adams HS	Dallas, TX
G/F	13	Dajy Vines	5 ft 9 in (1.75 m)	RS Sr	Santa Clara HS	Oxnard, CA
F	14	Hali Ford	6 ft 1 in (1.85 m)	Sr	Affton HS; Moberly Area CC	St. Louis, MO
F	15	Erika Williams	6 ft 0 in (1.83 m)	RS Jr	Diamond Ranch HS	Fresno, CA
F	21	Batabe Zempare	6 ft 2 in (1.88 m)	Sr	Chaparral HS	Accra, Ghana
G	22	Airica Carmon	6 ft 0 in (1.83 m)	So	Long Beach Poly HS	Long Beach, CA
F	23	Tylinn Carter	6 ft 1 in (1.85 m)	RS So	Serra HS; Delaware State	San Diego, CA
C	32	Jazmyne Bartee (I) (redshirt)	6 ft 2 in (1.88 m)	Jr	Chandler HS; UNLV	Chandler, AZ

Head coach

- Greg McCall (Cal State Bakersfield)

Assistant coach(es)

- Xavier Johnson (William Penn)
- Nikki Blue (UCLA)
- Zack Grasmick (Cal State Bakersfield)

Legend

- (C) Team captain
- (S) Suspended
- (I) Ineligible
- (W) Walk-on
- Injured
- Current redshirt

Roster

== Schedule ==
Date time, TV	Rank^{#}	Opponent^{#}	Result	Record	Site (attendance) city, state
Non-conference regular season
11/13/2015*; 7:00 pm		Pacific	L 74–80	0–1	Icardo Center (962); Bakersfield, CA
11/19/2015*; 7:00 pm		at UC Santa Barbara	L 60–61	0–2	The Thunderdome (434); Santa Barbara, CA
11/22/2015*; 1:00 pm		San Jose State	W 90–88 ^{OT}	1–2	Icardo Center (577); Bakersfield, CA
11/27/2015*; 7:00 pm		at Hawaiʻi; Rainbow Wahine Showdown	L 60–74	1–3	Stan Sheriff Center (2,020); Honolulu, HI
11/28/2015*; 3:30 pm		vs. No. 2 South Carolina; Rainbow Wahine Showdown	L 71–90	1–4	Stan Sheriff Center; Honolulu, HI
11/29/2015*; 4:30 pm		vs. No. 16 Arizona State; Rainbow Wahine Showdown	L 47–60	1–5	Stan Sheriff Center; Honolulu, HI
12/02/2015*; 7:00 pm		at Fresno State	L 52–57	1–6	Save Mart Center (1,983); Fresno, CA
12/05/2015*; 2:00 pm		at No. 24 UCLA	L 68–82	1–7	Pauley Pavilion (795); Los Angeles, CA
12/08/2015*; 7:00 pm		Pepperdine	L 73–76	1–8	Icardo Center (502); Bakersfield, CA
12/12/2015*; 7:00 pm		at UC Riverside	L 61–81	1–9	UC Riverside Student Recreation Center (250); Riverside, CA
12/15/2015*; 11:00 am		at No. 7 Oregon State	L 51–75	1–10	Gill Coliseum (8,223); Corvallis, OR
12/19/2015*; 1:00 pm		Cal Poly	W 57–52	2–10	Icardo Center (601); Bakersfield, CA
12/22/2015*; 2:00 pm		at No. 12 Stanford	L 41–83	2–11	Maples Pavilion (2,625); Stanford, CA
12/30/2015*; 7:00 pm		Hawaiʻi	L 55–65	2–12	Icardo Center (476); Bakersfield, CA
01/03/2016*; 1:00 pm		UC Irvine	W 65–39	3–12	Icardo Center (556); Bakersfield, CA
WAC regular season
01/07/2016; 7:00 pm		Chicago State	W 76–43	4–12 (1–0)	Icardo Center (680); Bakersfield, CA
01/09/2016; 3:00 pm		UMKC	L 40–56	4–13 (1–1)	Icardo Center (490); Bakersfield, CA
01/16/2016; 1:00 pm		Seattle	W 76–68	5–13 (2–1)	Icardo Center (396); Bakersfield, CA
01/21/2016; 5:00 pm		at Texas–Rio Grande Valley	L 46–60	5–14 (2–2)	UTRGV Fieldhouse (1,268); Edinburg, TX
01/23/2016; 1:00 pm		at New Mexico State	L 63–86	5–15 (2–3)	Pan American Center (5,034); Las Cruces, NM
01/28/2016; 7:00 pm		at Grand Canyon	L 51–61	5–16 (2–4)	Icardo Center (544); Bakersfield, CA
01/30/2016; 1:00 pm		Utah Valley	W 61–54	6–16 (3–4)	Icardo Center (822); Bakersfield, CA
02/04/2016; 5:00 pm		at UMKC	W 78–68	7–16 (4–4)	Swinney Recreation Center (286); Kansas City, MO
02/06/2016; 12:00 pm		at Chicago State	W 74–61	8–16 (5–4)	Emil and Patricia Jones Convocation Center (115); Chicago, IL
02/13/2016; 2:00 pm		at Utah Valley	L 53–72	8–17 (5–5)	PE Building (276); Orem, UT
02/18/2016; 7:00 pm		New Mexico State	L 59–67	8–18 (5–6)	Icardo Center (674); Bakersfield, CA
02/20/2016; 1:00 pm		Texas–Rio Grande Valley	W 80–66	9–18 (6–6)	Icardo Center (878); Bakersfield, CA
02/25/2016; 6:00 pm		at Grand Canyon	W 76–67	10–18 (7–6)	GCU Arena (298); Phoenix, AZ
03/05/2016; 2:00 pm		at Seattle	W 66–52	11–18 (8–6)	Connolly Center (637); Seattle, WA
WAC Women's Tournament
03/09/2016; 7:00 pm		vs. Seattle; Quarterfinals	W 62–55	12–18	Orleans Arena (894); Paradise, NV
03/11/2016; 2:30 pm		vs. Texas–Rio Grande Valley; Semifinals	L 72–73 ^{2OT}	12–19	Orleans Arena; Paradise, NV
*Non-conference game. ^{#}Rankings from AP Poll. (#) Tournament seedings in parentheses. All times are in Pacific Time.

== See also ==
- Cal State Bakersfield Roadrunners women's basketball
  - 2013–14 Cal State Bakersfield Roadrunners women's basketball team
- 2015–16 Cal State Bakersfield Roadrunners men's basketball team
