= Kelly Santos =

Brazilian basketball player (born 1979)

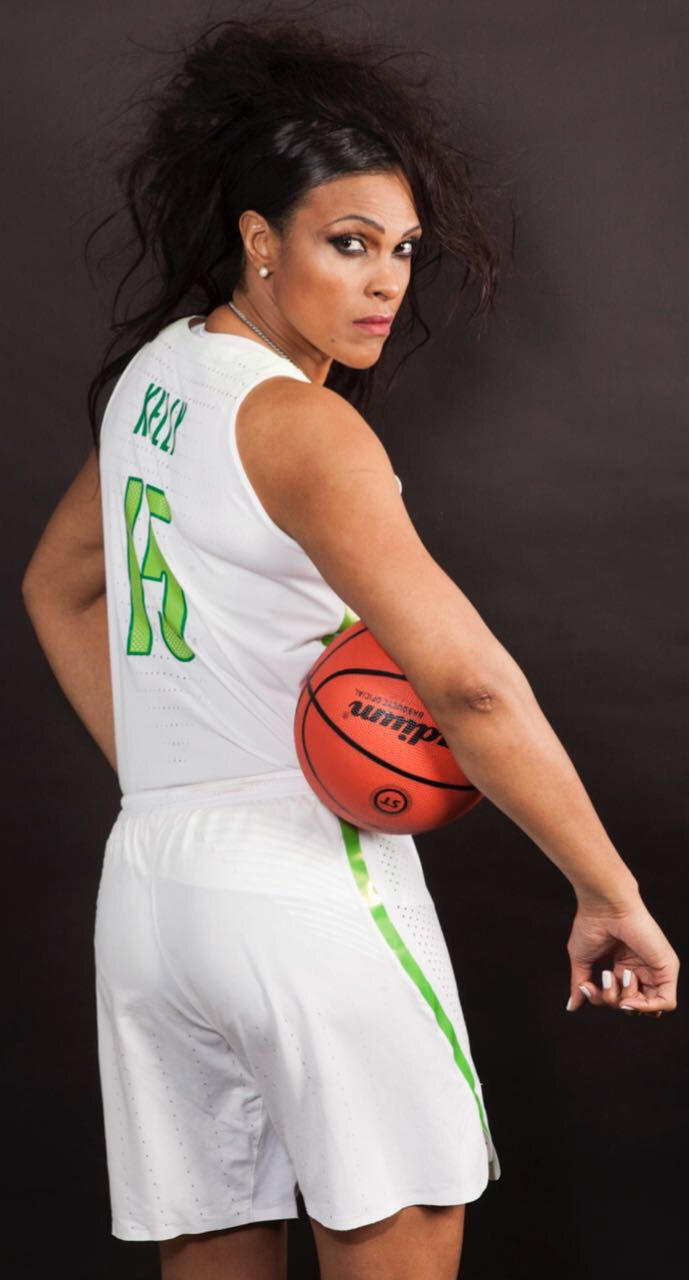

América Basquete
- Position: Center
- League: LBF

Personal information
- Born: November 10, 1979 (age 47) São Paulo, SP, Brazil
- Listed height: 6 ft 4 in (1.93 m)

Career information
- WNBA draft: 2001: 4th round, 54th overall pick
- Drafted by: Detroit Shock
- Stats at Basketball Reference
Medals
Women's basketball
Representing Brazil
Olympic Games
Bronze medal – third place	2000 Sydney	Team
Pan American Games
Silver medal – second place	2007 Rio	Team
Bronze medal – third place	2003 Santo Domingo	Team

Kelly da Silva Santos (born November 10, 1979) is a Brazilian professional women's basketball player . and the Brazilian national basketball team.

Santos has played in the Women's National Basketball Association with the Detroit Shock and Seattle Storm.

== Career statistics ==
Legend
GP	Games played	GS	Games started	MPG	Minutes per game	RPG	Rebounds per game
APG	Assists per game	SPG	Steals per game	BPG	Blocks per game	PPG	Points per game
TO	Turnovers per game	FG%	Field-goal percentage	3P%	3-point field-goal percentage	FT%	Free-throw percentage
**Bold**	Career best	°	League leader

=== WNBA ===
==== Regular season ====
WNBA regular season statistics
Year	Team	GP	GS	MPG	FG%	3P%	FT%	RPG	APG	SPG	BPG	TO	PPG
2001	Detroit	14	0	10.9	**.476**	.000	**.667**	1.9	0.4	0.2	0.2	0.9	**3.7**
2002	Detroit	12	0	**14.1**	.381	—	.600	**2.7**	**0.6**	**0.3**	**0.8**	1.2	**3.7**
2003	Did not play (waived)												
2004	Did not appear in league												
2005	Did not appear in league												
2006	Did not appear in league												
2007	Did not appear in league												
2008	Seattle	**22**	**1**	6.1	.390	—	.652	1.3	0.2	0.2	0.1	**0.5**	2.1
**Career**	3 years, 2 teams	48	1	9.5	.416	.000	.639	1.8	0.4	0.2	0.3	0.8	3.0

==== Playoffs ====
WNBA playoff statistics
Year	Team	GP	GS	MPG	FG%	3P%	FT%	RPG	APG	SPG	BPG	TO	PPG
2008	Seattle	2	0	1.0	.500	—	—	0.0	0.0	0.0	0.0	0.0	1.0
**Career**	1 year, 1 team	2	0	1.0	.500	—	—	0.0	0.0	0.0	0.0	0.0	1.0
