= 2015–16 UMKC Kangaroos women's basketball team =

Intercollegiate basketball season

2015–16 UMKC Kangaroos women's basketball
- Conference: Western Athletic Conference
- Record: 10–18 (5–9 WAC)
- Head coach: Marsha Frese (4th season)
- Assistant coaches: Meredith Doyle; Danielle Gratton; Pat Filien
- Home arena: Swinney Recreation Center; Municipal Auditorium

2015–16 WAC women's basketball standings
	Conf.				Overall
Team	W		L	PCT	W		L	PCT
New Mexico State †	13	–	1	.929	26	–	5	.839
UTRGV	9	–	5	.643	19	–	14	.576
Grand Canyon*	8	–	6	.571	16	–	15	.516
Utah Valley	8	–	6	.571	16	–	15	.516
Cal State Bakersfield	8	–	6	.571	12	–	19	.387
UMKC	5	–	9	.357	10	–	18	.357
Seattle	3	–	11	.214	9	–	21	.300
Chicago State	2	–	12	.143	4	–	25	.138
† 2016 WAC tournament winner As of March 18, 2016 * Grand Canyon ineligible for WAC Basketball Tournament as part of reclassification from Division II; Rankings from AP poll

The 2015–16 UMKC Kangaroos women's basketball team represented the University of Missouri–Kansas City during the 2015–16 NCAA Division I women's basketball season. The Kangaroos, led by fourth-year coach Marsha Frese, played most of their home games at the Swinney Recreation Center in Kansas City, Missouri, with two taking place at Municipal Auditorium. UMKC entered the season as members of the Western Athletic Conference (WAC). They finished the season 10–18, 5–9 in WAC play, to finish sixth place. They lost in the quarterfinals of the WAC women's tournament to Utah Valley.

== Roster ==
Number	Name	Position	Height	Year	Hometown
1	Daijane Dillard	Guard	5'4"	Sophomore	Los Angeles, CA
2	Kristen Moore	Forward	6'0"	RS Freshman	Chicago, IL
3	Sierra Bone	Guard	5'10"	Sophomore	Flower Mound, TX
5	India Johnson	Guard	5'6"	Junior	Overland Park, KS
10	Aries Washington	Guard	5'9"	Sophomore	Kansas City, MO
11	Justice Collins	Guard	5'7"	Junior	Springfield, IL
12	Kelsey Barrett	Guard	5'10"	Junior	Kansas City, MO
13	Taylor Leathers	Guard/Forward	6'0"	Senior	Overland Park, KS
15	Ceidra Coleman	Forward	6'0"	Junior	Bryan, TX
21	Grace Mitchell	Forward	6'0"	Junior	Plano, TX
22	Samantha Waldron	Guard	5'11"	Sophomore	Omaha, NE
23	LaDerica Paul	Guard	5'8"	Freshman	Dallas, TX
32	Kiana Law	Forward	6'1"	Sophomore	Pittsburgh, PA
41	Paige Husa	Center	6'1"	Sophomore	Fairbury, NE

== Schedule ==
Date time, TV	Rank^{#}	Opponent^{#}	Result	Record	Site (attendance) city, state
Exhibition
November 6, 2015*; 7:30 p.m.		Rockhurst	L 52–58		Swinney Recreation Center; Kansas City, MO
Non-conference regular season
November 13, 2015*; 1:00 p.m.		North Florida	L 55–62	0–1	Swinney Recreation Center (156); Kansas City, MO
November 16, 2015*; 7:00 p.m., ESPN3		at Milwaukee	L 48–70	0–2	Klotsche Center (516); Milwaukee, WI
November 20, 2015*; 6:00 p.m.		at Southeast Missouri State	L 65–78	0–3	Show Me Center (642); Cape Girardeau, MO
November 27, 2015*; 1:00 p.m.		Indiana State; Plaza Lights Classic	L 47–77	0–4	Swinney Recreation Center (296); Kansas City, MO
November 28, 2015*; 3:30 p.m.		SIU Edwardsville; Plaza Lights Classic	L 58–63	0–5	Swinney Recreation Center (189); Kansas City, MO
December 3, 2015*; 7:00 p.m., ESPN3		at Nebraska–Omaha	L 42–57	0–6	Baxter Arena (655); Omaha, NE
December 6, 2015*; 2:00 p.m.		Stephens College	W 76–46	1–6	Swinney Recreation Center (218); Kansas City, MO
December 10, 2015*; 7:00 p.m., TWCS KC		at Kansas	W 47–44	2–6	Allen Fieldhouse (1,736); Lawrence, KS
December 12, 2015*; 1:00 p.m., WAC DN		Denver	W 68–58	3–6	Municipal Auditorium (207); Kansas City, MO
December 19, 2015*; 1:00 p.m., KSMO		Bethany	W 64–51	4–6	Municipal Auditorium (209); Kansas City, MO
December 22, 2015*; 1:00 p.m.		at No. 15 Northwestern	L 38–80	4–7	Welsh-Ryan Arena (625); Evanston, IL
December 30, 2015*; 3:00 p.m.		at Towson	L 47–70	4–8	SECU Arena (382); Towson, MD
January 2, 2016*; 1:00 p.m.		at Morgan State	W 59–50	5–8	Talmadge L. Hill Field House (58); Baltimore, MD
WAC regular season
January 7, 2016; 9:00 p.m., WAC DN		at Seattle	L 63–69	5–9 (0–1)	Connolly Center (234); Seattle, WA
January 9, 2016; 5:00 p.m.		at Cal State Bakersfield	W 56–40	6–9 (1–1)	Icardo Center (490); Bakersfield, CA
January 14, 2016; 7:00 p.m., WAC DN		New Mexico State	L 62–68	6–10 (1–2)	Swinney Recreation Center (231); Kansas City, MO
January 16, 2016; 2:00 p.m., WAC DN		UTRGV	L 53–62	6–11 (1–3)	Swinney Recreation Center (247); Kansas City, MO
January 21, 2016; 6:00 p.m., WAC DN		at Utah Valley	L 71–79	6–12 (1–4)	UCCU Center (222); Orem, UT
January 24, 2016; 3:00 p.m., WAC DN		at Grand Canyon	W 63–57	7–12 (2–4)	GCU Arena (217); Phoenix, AZ
January 30, 2016; 2:00 p.m.		at Chicago State	L 72–77 ^{OT}	7–13 (2–5)	Emil and Patricia Jones Convocation Center (231); Chicago, IL
February 4, 2016; 7:00 p.m., WAC DN		Cal State Bakersfield	L 68–78	7–14 (2–6)	Swinney Recreation Center (286); Kansas City, MO
February 6, 2015; 1:00 p.m.		Seattle	W 64–43	8–14 (3–6)	Swinney Recreation Center (248); Kansas City, MO
February 13, 2016; 1:00 p.m., WAC DN		at UTRGV	W 59–57	9–14 (4–6)	UTRGV Fieldhouse (668); Edinburg, TX
February 18, 2015; 7:00 p.m.		Grand Canyon	L 59–68	9–15 (4–7)	Swinney Recreation Center (365); Kansas City, MO
February 20, 2016; 2:00 p.m., WAC DN		Utah Valley	L 44–58	9–16 (4–8)	Swinney Recreation Center (411); Kansas City, MO
February 27, 2016; 3:00 p.m.		at New Mexico State	L 74–78 ^{OT}	9–17 (4–9)	Pan American Center (1,142); Las Cruces, NM
March 5, 2016; 2:00 p.m.		Chicago State	W 67–50	10–17 (5–9)	Swinney Recreation Center (472); Kansas City, MO
WAC women's tournament
March 9, 2016; 4:00 p.m., WAC DN		vs. Utah Valley; Quarterfinals	L 53–61	10–18	Orleans Arena; Paradise, NV
*Non-conference game. ^{#}Rankings from AP poll. (#) Tournament seedings in parentheses. All times are in Central.

== See also ==
- 2015–16 UMKC Kangaroos men's basketball team
