= 2016 WAC women's basketball tournament =

2016 Western Athletic Conference women's basketball tournament
- Classification: Division I
- Season: 2015–16
- Teams: 7
- Site: Orleans Arena; Paradise, Nevada
- Champions: New Mexico State (2nd title)
- Winning coach: Mark Trakh (2nd title)
- MVP: Sasha Weber (New Mexico State)
- Attendance: 3,289
- Television: ESPNU; WAC Digital

2015–16 WAC women's basketball standings
| | Conf. | | | | Overall |
| Team | W | | L | PCT | W | | L | PCT |
|---|---|---|---|---|---|---|---|---|
| New Mexico State † | 13 | – | 1 | .929 | 26 | – | 5 | .839 |
| UTRGV | 9 | – | 5 | .643 | 19 | – | 14 | .576 |
| Grand Canyon* | 8 | – | 6 | .571 | 16 | – | 15 | .516 |
| Utah Valley | 8 | – | 6 | .571 | 16 | – | 15 | .516 |
| Cal State Bakersfield | 8 | – | 6 | .571 | 12 | – | 19 | .387 |
| UMKC | 5 | – | 9 | .357 | 10 | – | 18 | .357 |
| Seattle | 3 | – | 11 | .214 | 9 | – | 21 | .300 |
| Chicago State | 2 | – | 12 | .143 | 4 | – | 25 | .138 |
† 2016 WAC tournament winner As of March 18, 2016 * Grand Canyon ineligible for WAC Basketball Tournament as part of reclassification from Division II; Rankings from AP poll

The 2016 WAC women's basketball tournament was a tournament which was held on March 9–12, 2016, at the Orleans Arena in Paradise, Nevada. The #1 seed in the tournament will receive a first round bye to the semifinals. Grand Canyon did not compete in the 2016 women's basketball tournament. As a D2 to D1 transitioning school, they are ineligible to compete in the NCAA tournament until the 2018 season, so they can not win the conference tournament since the winner received an automatic bid to the NCAA Tournament. However Grand Canyon is eligible to win the regular season title and is eligible to compete in the WNIT or WBI should they be invited. New Mexico State won their second straight WAC Tournament to earn an automatic trip to the 2016 NCAA tournament.

== Seeds ==
2016 WAC Women's Basketball Tournament seeds
| Seed | School | Conference Record | Overall Record (End of Regular season) | Tiebreaker |
| 1. | New Mexico State | 13–1 | 24–4 | |
| 2. | Texas–Rio Grande Valley | 9–5 | 17–12 | |
| 3. | Cal State Bakersfield | 8–6 | 11–18 | 1–1 vs. Utah Valley |
| 4. | Utah Valley | 8–6 | 15–14 | 1–1 vs. Cal State Bakersfield |
| 5. | UMKC | 5–9 | 10–17 | |
| 6. | Seattle | 3–11 | 9–20 | |
| 7. | Chicago State | 2–12 | 4–24 | |

== Schedule ==
| Session | Game | Time* | Matchup^{#} | Television | Attendance |
Quarterfinals – Wednesday, March 9
| 1 | 1 | 2:00 PM | #4 Utah Valley vs. #5 UMKC | WAC DN | 894 |
| 1 | 2 | 4:30 PM | #2 Texas–Rio Grande Valley vs. #7 Chicago State | WAC DN | 894 |
| 1 | 3 | 7:00 PM | #3 Cal State Bakersfield vs. #6 Seattle | WAC DN | 894 |
Semifinals – Friday, March 11
| 2 | 4 | 12:00 PM | #1 New Mexico State vs. #4 Utah Valley | WAC DN | 1,618 |
| 2 | 5 | 2:30 PM | #2 Texas–Rio Grande Valley vs. #3 Cal State Bakersfield | WAC DN | 1,618 |
Championship Game – Saturday, March 12
| 3 | 6 | 1:00 PM | #1 New Mexico State vs. #2 Texas–Rio Grande Valley | ESPNU | 777 |
*Game Times in PT. #-Rankings denote tournament seeding.

== Bracket ==
Quarterfinals; Wednesday, March 9
4 | Utah Valley | 61
5 | UMKC | 53
2 | UTRGV | 60
7 | Chicago State | 52
3 | Cal State Bakersfield | 62
6 | Seattle | 55

Semifinals; Friday, March 11
1 | New Mexico State | 58
4 | Utah Valley | 44
2 | UTRGV | 73^{2OT}
3 | Cal State Bakersfield | 72

Championship; Saturday, March 12
1 | New Mexico State | 80
2 | UTRGV | 53

== See also ==
- 2016 WAC men's basketball tournament
