= Kristen O'Neill =

American basketball player and coach (born 1983)

Seattle Redhawks
- Title: Associate head coach
- League: Western Athletic Conference

Personal information
- Born: April 12, 1983 (age 43)
- Listed height: 6 ft 1 in (1.85 m)
- Listed weight: 158 lb (72 kg)

Career information
- High school: Meadowdale (Lynnwood, Washington)
- College: Washington (2001–2006)
- WNBA draft: 2006: undrafted
- Playing career: 2006–2009
- Position: Shooting guard / small forward
- Number: 32
- Coaching career: 2009–present

Career history

Playing
- 2008: Seattle Storm

Coaching
- 2009–present: Seattle University (asst./assoc. HC)

Career highlights
- Pac-12 All-Freshman Team (2002)
- Stats at WNBA.com
- Stats at Basketball Reference

Kristen O'Neill (born April 12, 1983) is an American basketball player, a 6'1 versatile guard, formerly playing at the University of Washington. She was a three-time co-captain and four-year starter. She played for FIBA's Euroleague teams in Madrid and Burgos, Spain and in Ireland. In 2008, O'Neill returned to Seattle and played in the WNBA for the Seattle Storm. She is currently the Associate Head Women's Basketball coach for Seattle University.

== High school ==
O'Neill played at Meadowdale High School. She was a Parade Magazine All-American, Gatorade Player of the Year for the state of Washington, and one of the top recruits in the country in 2001 (ranked No. 38 among top 750 seniors in class of 2001 by All-Star Girls Report and ranked No. 19 on HoopPlanet.com's list of top 100 recruits for 2001).

== College ==
O'Neill played at the University of Washington from 2001–2006 where she was a three-time co-captain and four-year starter. She was UW's Defensive Player of the Year twice (2002 and 2003), a 2002 Pacific-10 All-Freshman Team honoree and the Coaches Award recipient in 2006. O'Neill graduated with honors in 2006 with a degree in communication.

== Washington statistics ==
Legend
GP	Games played	GS	Games started	MPG	Minutes per game
FG%	Field goal percentage	3P%	3-point field goal percentage	FT%	Free throw percentage
RPG	Rebounds per game	APG	Assists per game	SPG	Steals per game
BPG	Blocks per game	PPG	Points per game	**Bold**	Career high

Year	Team	GP	Points	FG%	3P%	FT%	RPG	APG	SPG	BPG	PPG
2001–02	Washington	**31**	189	**43.0**	**43.6**	65.8	3.7	**2.2**	**1.9**	**0.5**	6.1
2002–03	Washington	30	160	40.1	26.6	53.8	**4.4**	2.1	1.7	0.4	5.3
2003–04	Washington	redshirt									
2004–05	Washington	30	**284**	38.0	34.1	66.7	3.5	1.8	1.2	0.4	**9.5**
2005–06	Washington	30	250	36.5	28.2	**68.8**	3.8	1.8	1.7	**0.5**	8.3
Career Totals	Washington	121	883	39.0	32.7	64.9	3.9	2.0	1.6	0.5	7.3

== Professionally ==
O'Neill, a local fan favorite, played for the Seattle Storm during the 2008 season. She declined an invite to training camp in 2009 due to a knee injury.

== WNBA career statistics ==
Legend
GP	Games played	GS	Games started	MPG	Minutes per game	RPG	Rebounds per game
APG	Assists per game	SPG	Steals per game	BPG	Blocks per game	PPG	Points per game
TO	Turnovers per game	FG%	Field-goal percentage	3P%	3-point field-goal percentage	FT%	Free-throw percentage
**Bold**	Career best	°	League leader

=== Regular season ===
Year	Team	GP	GS	MPG	FG%	3P%	FT%	RPG	APG	SPG	BPG	TO	PPG
2008	Seattle	11	0	2.8	0.0	0.0	0.0	0.3	0.1	0.0	0.0	0.1	0.0
Career	1 year, 1 team	11	0	2.8	0.0	0.0	0.0	0.3	0.1	0.0	0.0	0.1	0.0

== Coaching ==
O'Neill was hired on as an assistant for Seattle University in 2009 by Joan Bonvicini. She was appointed to Associate Head Coach in 2012.
