= Bodwell High School =

Location
- 955 Harbourside Drive; North Vancouver, British Columbia, V7P 3S4; Canada; 49.31422°N 123.10105°W

Information
- School type: university-preparatory high school
- Motto: Education for a Changing World
- Founded: 1991
- President: Paul Yuen
- Principal: Housam Hallis
- Head of school: Stephen Goobie
- Staff: 100+
- Grades: 8-12
- Secondary years taught: 8th through 12th grades
- Enrollment: 450 (2025-2026)
- Average class size: 18-24
- Language: English
- Colours: Purple, Gold
- Team name: Bruins
- Accreditation: BC Ministry of Education and Child Care
- Affiliation: BC Federation of Independent Schools Association IB World Schools
- Alumni: Tony Yu, Co-Founder of Vessi Ali Erfani, Stanford University Dr. Esther Gan
- Website: bodwell.edu

Bodwell High School is a fully-accredited day and boarding high school located in North Vancouver, British Columbia, Canada. Founded in 1991, the school serves students in Grades 8 through 12 from Metro Vancouver, across Canada, and from over 40 countries.

Bodwell offers a university-preparatory program that includes the IB Middle Years Programme (Grades 8-10), the British Columbia provincial curriculum, and Advanced Placement (AP) courses in the senior grades. Graduates receive the British Columbia Dogwood Diploma issued by the BC Ministry of Education and Child Care.

The school operates both day and boarding programs, including weekday boarding and full boarding options.

== History ==
Bodwell High School was established in 1991 in Vancouver, British Columbia. In 2003, the school relocated to its current waterfront campus on Harbourside Drive in North Vancouver, overlooking Burrard Inlet and the Port of Vancouver.

The school was founded by Paul Yuen and Cathy Lee, who were involved in the development of international education programming in British Columbia. In recognition of their contributions to international education, they received the British Columbia Council for International Education (BCCIE) Lifetime Achievement Award.

Since its relocation, the school has expanded its academic and residential programming, serving both Canadian and international students.

== Academic Program ==
Bodwell’s academic structure includes:

• IB Middle Years Programme (Grades 8-10)

• BC Curriculum (Grades 10-12)

• Advanced Placement (AP) courses

• University guidance and academic counselling

The school emphasizes university preparation, structured academic planning, and English language development for multilingual students.

In addition to core academics, Bodwell offers applied learning programs, including Real World Academies in areas such as STEM and media.

== Campus and Facilities ==
The North Vancouver campus includes classroom buildings, student dormitories, athletic facilities, and waterfront recreational areas. The school serves both local day students and boarding students.

== Student Life ==
Bodwell offers a range of athletics, arts, and extracurricular programs. Teams compete in regional athletics, and students participate in performing arts, music, and clubs.

== Awards and Recognition ==
Bodwell High School received the Study Travel Magazine “STM Star High School Award” in 2014 and 2015. The school also received recognition from the British Columbia Council for International Education (BCCIE).

== Accreditation and Memberships ==
Bodwell High School is certified by the British Columbia Ministry of Education and Child Care. The school is a member of:

- Federation of Independent Schools British Columbia Associate Member Schools (FISA AMS)
- International Baccalaureate World Schools
- British Columbia Council for International Education (BCCIE)

== Co-curricular Programs ==
Bodwell offers athletics, arts, and extracurricular activities including:

- Basketball, soccer, volleyball, swimming, and track and field
- Outdoor adventure and fitness programs
- Visual arts, music, and performing arts clubs
