= Clay Center Community Middle School =

Middle school in Clay Center, Nebraska, United States

Coordinates: 40°31′23″N 98°03′04″W

Information
- Established: 1880; 146 years ago
- Website: www.usd379.org/o/clay-center-ms

Clay Center Community Middle School is a middle school in Clay Center, Nebraska, United States. It is a public school and has about 201 students.

Formal education began in Clay Center with a subscription school taught by Mrs. Charles Wanser in 1880. On April 4, 1881, the first public school was authorized. The building was expanded with bond issues many times. The current middle school building was built in 1967.

In 2008, a school meeting was planned to determine where students would go to school. The general consensus was that students could go to Harvard High in nearby Harvard, Nebraska, or to Sandy Creek High School, a few miles south of Clay Center. Sandy Creek is located two miles outside of Fairfield, and has been consolidated since the late 1960s.
