= New Mexico State Aggies women's basketball =

New Mexico State Aggies
2026–27 New Mexico State Aggies women's basketball team
- University: New Mexico State University
- Head coach: Adeniyi Amadou (1st season)
- Location: Las Cruces, New Mexico
- Arena: Pan American Center (capacity: 12,482)
- Conference: Conference USA
- Nickname: Aggies
- Colors: Crimson and white

NCAA Division I tournament second round
- 1988

NCAA Division I tournament appearances
- 1987, 1988, 2015, 2016, 2017, 2019

Conference tournament champions
- 2015, 2016, 2017, 2019

Conference regular-season champions
- High County: 1987, 1988, Big West: 1995; Sun Belt: 2003; WAC: 2015, 2016, 2017, 2019

Conference division champions
- Sun Belt 2003 (West Division)

Uniforms
Home	Away

The New Mexico State Aggies women's basketball team represents New Mexico State University in Las Cruces, New Mexico, United States. They are a member of Conference USA.

== History ==
New Mexico State began play in 1973. They were members of the Intermountain Athletic Conference from 1974 to 1982, the High County Athletic Conference from 1983 to 1990, the Big West Conference from 1991 to 2000, the Sun Belt Conference from 2001 to 2005, the Western Athletic Conference from 2005 to 2023 before joining Conference USA in 2023. They lost in the conference tournament championship game in 2006, 2007, and 2008 before winning the WAC title in 2015 and 2016. The Aggies have won regular season titles in 1987 (shared), 1988, 1995, 2003 (West Division, shared), 2015, and 2016. They made the WNIT in 1994 and 2010. They have lost in the first game of all four NCAA Tournaments they have played in (with a second round appearance in 1988 due to a bye). As of the end of the 2015–16 season, they have an all-time record of 662–572.

On March 11, 2026, New Mexico state hired Adeniyi Amadou as the new head coach of the team. This is his first coaching stint as a head coach but has 15 years of experience, most recently as the associate head coach at Rhode Island.

== NCAA tournament results ==
Year	Seed	Round	Opponent	Result
1987	#9	First Round	#8 Washington	L 73−86
1988	#6	Second Round	#3 Washington	L 74−99
2015	#16	First Round	#1 Maryland	L 57−75
2016	#15	First Round	#2 Arizona State	L 52−74
2017	#15	First Round	#2 Stanford	L 64−72
2019	#14	First Round	#3 Iowa State	L 61−97
